= National Register of Historic Places listings in eastern Chester County, Pennsylvania =

Location of Chester County in Pennsylvania

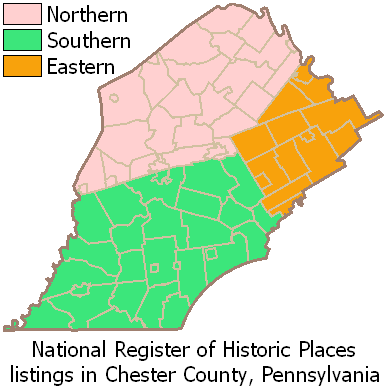
Map of Chester County (clickable)

This is a list of the National Register of Historic Places listings in eastern Chester County, Pennsylvania.

This is intended to be a complete list of the properties and districts on the National Register of Historic Places in eastern Chester County, Pennsylvania, United States. Eastern Chester County is defined for this list as being the municipalities south and east of a line extending from Phoenixville to Exton to West Chester. The locations of National Register properties and districts for which the latitude and longitude coordinates are included below, may be seen in a map.

There are 323 properties and districts listed on the Register in Chester County, including 7 National Historic Landmarks. Eastern Chester County includes 113 properties and districts, including 4 National Historic Landmarks; the county's remaining properties and districts are listed elsewhere. One district, the Middle Pickering Rural Historic District, is split between Northern and Eastern Chester County, and is thus included on both lists.

This National Park Service list is complete through NPS recent listings posted September 11, 2026.

== Current listings ==
	Name on the Register	Image	Date listed	Location	Municipality	Description
1	David Ashbridge Log House	David Ashbridge Log House	November 6, 1984 (#84003878)	1181 King Road; 40°01′06″N 75°35′21″W	West Whiteland Township	
2	Autun	Autun	September 6, 1984 (#84003232)	371 East Boot Road; 40°00′39″N 75°36′21″W	West Whiteland Township	
3	Bank of Chester County	Bank of Chester County	June 5, 1972 (#02001458)	17 North High Street; 39°57′37″N 75°36′17″W	West Chester	
4	Barclay House	Barclay House	April 18, 2002 (#02000380)	535 and 539 North Church Street; 39°57′55″N 75°36′35″W	West Chester	
5	William J. Barnard Residence	William J. Barnard Residence	July 21, 1982 (#82003779)	920 East Street Road; 39°55′59″N 75°32′46″W	Thornbury Township	
6	Bartram's Covered Bridge	Bartram's Covered Bridge	December 10, 1980 (#80003462)	West of Newtown on Legislative Route 15098; 39°59′23″N 75°26′15″W	Willistown Township	Extends into Newtown Township in Delaware County
7	John Bell Farm	John Bell Farm	September 6, 1984 (#84003235)	463 North Ship Road; 40°02′39″N 75°37′17″W	West Whiteland Township	
8	Black Rock Bridge	Black Rock Bridge	June 22, 1988 (#88000735)	Pennsylvania Route 113 over the Schuylkill River; 40°09′32″N 75°30′44″W	Phoenixville	Extends into Upper Providence Township in Montgomery County
9	Riter Boyer House	Riter Boyer House	November 10, 1983 (#83004207)	350 West Boot Road; 40°00′21″N 75°37′48″W	West Whiteland Township	
10	Buckwalter Building	Buckwalter Building	February 22, 1984 (#84003180)	11–13 South High Street; 39°57′34″N 75°36′15″W	West Chester	
11	Butler House	Butler House	July 23, 1980 (#80003470)	228 West Miner Street; 39°57′25″N 75°36′26″W	West Chester	
12	Charlestown Village Historic District	Charlestown Village Historic District	May 16, 1978 (#78002374)	Southwest of Phoenixville on Charlestown Road; 40°05′58″N 75°33′24″W	Charlestown Township	
13	Squire Cheyney Farm	Squire Cheyney Farm	January 11, 2010 (#09001214)	1255 Cheyney Thornton Road; 39°59′17″N 75°31′22″W	Thornbury Township	
14	Chester County Courthouse	Chester County Courthouse	June 5, 1972 (#72001109)	10 North High Street; 39°57′35″N 75°36′18″W	West Chester	
15	Church Farm School Historic District	Church Farm School Historic District	October 26, 1984 (#84002733)	U.S. Route 30; 40°01′54″N 75°35′41″W	West Whiteland Township	
16	Moses Coates Jr. Farm	Moses Coates Jr. Farm	May 3, 1984 (#84003186)	1416 State Road; 40°06′58″N 75°31′23″W	Schuylkill Township	
17	Colebrook Manor	Colebrook Manor	September 6, 1984 (#84003239)	637 West Lincoln Highway near Exton; 40°01′22″N 75°39′52″W	West Whiteland Township	
18	Collins Mansion	Collins Mansion	November 9, 1972 (#72001110)	633 Goshen Road; 39°58′31″N 75°36′12″W	West Goshen Township	
19	County Bridge No. 148	County Bridge No. 148	June 22, 1988 (#88000879)	Pennsylvania Route 926 over Chester Creek, near Westtown; 39°55′54″N 75°33′06″W	Westtown Township	
20	County Bridge No. 171	County Bridge No. 171	June 22, 1988 (#88000762)	Cedar Hollow Road over Valley Creek; 40°03′12″N 75°30′03″W	Tredyffrin Township	
21	Hewson Cox House	Hewson Cox House	August 2, 1984 (#84003188)	Church Farm Road; 40°02′51″N 75°36′24″W	West Whiteland Township	
22	Cramond	Cramond	June 30, 1983 (#83002222)	95 Crestline Road near Strafford; 40°03′01″N 75°24′13″W	Tredyffrin Township	
23	Cressbrook Farm	Cressbrook Farm	October 26, 1972 (#72001106)	South of Valley Forge, off Interstate 76; 40°04′38″N 75°27′03″W	Tredyffrin Township	
24	Hunt Downing House	Hunt Downing House	October 11, 1990 (#84003960)	600 West Lincoln Highway near Exton; 40°01′13″N 75°39′35″W	West Whiteland Township	
25	Wharton Esherick Studio	Wharton Esherick Studio	April 26, 1973 (#73001615)	1520 Horseshoe Trail; 40°05′01″N 75°29′36″W	Tredyffrin Township	
26	William Everhart Buildings	William Everhart Buildings	July 17, 1979 (#79002206)	28 West Market Street; 39°57′33″N 75°36′19″W	West Chester	
27	William Everhart House	William Everhart House	August 2, 1984 (#84003249)	South Ship and Boot Roads; 40°00′34″N 75°35′36″W	West Whiteland Township	
28	Exton Hotel	Exton Hotel	January 11, 1983 (#83004201)	423 East Lincoln Highway near Exton; 40°01′45″N 75°37′06″W	West Whiteland Township	
29	Farmers and Mechanics Trust Company Building	Farmers and Mechanics Trust Company Building	January 6, 1983 (#83002223)	Market and High Streets; 39°57′34″N 75°36′16″W	West Chester	
30	Federal Barn	Federal Barn	February 8, 1980 (#80003469)	Off Pennsylvania Route 252; 40°04′38″N 75°27′02″W	Tredyffrin Township	
31	First Presbyterian Church of West Chester	First Presbyterian Church of West Chester	November 27, 1972 (#72001111)	130 West Miner Street; 39°57′27″N 75°36′21″W	West Chester	The first commission of Thomas Ustick Walter (1832)
32	Fox Chase Inn	Fox Chase Inn	September 6, 1984 (#84003253)	613 Swedesford Road; 40°02′18″N 75°36′53″W	West Whiteland Township	
33	Garrett Farmstead	Garrett Farmstead	February 27, 2003 (#03000076)	808 and 816 Warren Avenue; 39°59′41″N 75°29′19″W	Willistown Township	
34	Gay Street School	Gay Street School	November 1, 1983 (#83004202)	Gay and Morgan Streets; 40°07′49″N 75°31′04″W	Phoenixville	
35	Goodwin Acres	Goodwin Acres	June 27, 1980 (#80003471)	600 Reservoir Road; 39°58′55″N 75°33′16″W	East Goshen Township	
36	Goshenville Historic District	Goshenville Historic District	November 8, 2000 (#00001347)	Mainly along North Chester Road near its junction with Paoli Pike; 39°59′43″N 75°32′35″W	East Goshen Township	
37	Great Valley Mill	Great Valley Mill	September 1, 1983 (#83002224)	72 North Valley Road; 40°03′58″N 75°29′25″W	Tredyffrin Township	
38	Greenwood Farm	Greenwood Farm	October 24, 1996 (#96001196)	888 West Valley Drive near Wayne; 40°04′03″N 75°25′26″W	Tredyffrin Township	
39	Greenwood School	Greenwood School	November 10, 1983 (#83004208)	700 King Road; 40°00′50″N 75°35′58″W	West Whiteland Township	
40	Grove Historic District	Grove Historic District	August 2, 1984 (#84003264)	South Whitford Road near Downingtown; 40°00′16″N 75°38′03″W	West Whiteland Township	
41	David Havard House	David Havard House	October 26, 1972 (#72001107)	South of Valley Forge, off Interstate 76; 40°04′24″N 75°27′47″W	Tredyffrin Township	
42	George Hoffman House	George Hoffman House	April 2, 1984 (#84003272)	1311 Grove Road; 39°59′42″N 75°37′57″W	West Whiteland Township	
43	Ivy Cottage	Ivy Cottage	November 9, 2018 (#84003961)	225 W. Lincoln Hwy. 40°01′38″N 75°38′01″W	West Whiteland Township	
44	Benjamin Jacobs House	Benjamin Jacobs House	August 2, 1984 (#84003274)	325 North Ship Road; 40°02′23″N 75°37′06″W	West Whiteland Township	
45	Francis W. Kennedy House	Francis W. Kennedy House	August 2, 1984 (#84003277)	4717 Highland Avenue; 40°00′20″N 75°39′18″W	West Whiteland Township	
46	Kinbawn	Kinbawn	September 6, 1984 (#84003280)	405 Highland Avenue; 40°00′11″N 75°39′09″W	West Whiteland Township	
47	Kirkland Station	Kirkland Station	November 10, 1983 (#83004209)	1370 Kirkland Avenue; 40°00′38″N 75°36′06″W	West Whiteland Township	
48	Lafayette's Quarters	Lafayette's Quarters	June 20, 1974 (#74001774)	Southeast of Valley Forge on Wilson Road; 40°04′18″N 75°27′33″W	Tredyffrin Township	
49	Lapp Log House	Lapp Log House	January 23, 1980 (#80003455)	South of Chester Springs at Conestoga and Yellow Springs Roads; 40°03′18″N 75°35′38″W	East Whiteland Township	
50	Evan Lewis House	Evan Lewis House	August 2, 1984 (#84003286)	117 North Ship Road near Exton; 40°01′57″N 75°36′42″W	West Whiteland Township	
51	Lochiel Farm	Lochiel Farm	September 6, 1984 (#84003289)	111A North Ship Road; 40°01′55″N 75°36′31″W	West Whiteland Township	
52	Martin-Little House	Martin-Little House	July 2, 1973 (#73001611)	South of Phoenixville off Pennsylvania Route 113 on Church Road; 40°05′03″N 75°33′51″W	Charlestown Township	
53	Daniel Meredith House	Daniel Meredith House	August 2, 1984 (#84003291)	1358 Glen Echo Road; 40°00′15″N 75°36′39″W	West Whiteland Township	
54	Middle Pickering Rural Historic District	Middle Pickering Rural Historic District	September 6, 1991 (#91001125)	Pikeland, Yellow Springs, Merlin, Church, and Pickering Roads; 40°05′40″N 75°34′38″W	Charlestown Township	Extends into East and West Pikeland Townships in northern Chester County
55	Moore Hall	Moore Hall	November 19, 1974 (#74001771)	East of Phoenixville on Valley Forge Road; 40°07′22″N 75°29′01″W	Schuylkill Township	
56	Mount Zion A.M.E. Church	Mount Zion A.M.E. Church	January 27, 2015 (#14001220)	380 N. Fairfield Rd. 40°03′23″N 75°26′03″W	Tredyffrin Township	
57	New Century Clubhouse	New Century Clubhouse	February 24, 1983 (#83002225)	501 South High Street; 39°57′20″N 75°35′58″W	West Chester	
58	Newlin Miller's House	Newlin Miller's House	September 6, 1984 (#84003293)	1240 Samuel Road; 39°59′40″N 75°38′12″W	West Whiteland Township	
59	Oaklands	Oaklands	September 6, 1984 (#84003295)	349 West Lincoln Highway; 40°01′31″N 75°38′37″W	West Whiteland Township	
60	Okehocking Historic District	Okehocking Historic District	August 2, 1993 (#93000719)	Roughly bounded by West Chester Pike, Plumsock Road, Goshen Road, and Garrett Mill Road, near Media; 39°58′35″N 75°29′19″W	Willistown Township	
61	Martha and Maurice Ostheimer Estate	Martha and Maurice Ostheimer Estate	February 16, 1996 (#96000099)	620 West Lincoln Highway near Exton; 40°01′13″N 75°39′45″W	West Whiteland Township	
62	Paoli Battlefield Site and Parade Grounds	Paoli Battlefield Site and Parade Grounds	October 23, 1997 (#97001248)	Roughly bounded by Warren, and Monument Avenues, and Sugartown Road; 40°01′42″N 75°31′10″W	Malvern	
63	Benjamin Pennypacker House	Benjamin Pennypacker House	August 2, 1984 (#84003298)	800 East Swedesford Road; 40°02′27″N 75°36′14″W	West Whiteland Township	
64	Matthias Pennypacker Farm	Matthias Pennypacker Farm	December 27, 1977 (#77001154)	South of Phoenixville on White Horse Road; 40°06′38″N 75°30′27″W	Schuylkill Township	
65	Phoenixville Historic District	Phoenixville Historic District	March 17, 1987 (#87000378)	Roughly bounded by Penn Street, railroad tracks, 4th Avenue, and Wheatland Street; Boundary decrease (listed April 18, 2012, refnum 12000220): High, Dayton, Railroad, Vanderslice, Bridge, & N. Main Sts., Wheatland & French Cr. 40°07′57″N 75°31′02″W	Phoenixville	
66	Pickwick	Pickwick	July 28, 1988 (#88001163)	Northern side of Swedesford Road; 40°02′28″N 75°35′40″W	West Whiteland Township	
67	Joseph Price House	Joseph Price House	September 6, 1984 (#84003299)	401 Clover Mill Road; 40°01′04″N 75°38′27″W	West Whiteland Township	
68	Joseph Rothrock House	Joseph Rothrock House	September 6, 1984 (#84003211)	428 North Church Street; 39°57′49″N 75°36′34″W	West Chester	
69	Roughwood	Roughwood	November 23, 1984 (#84000318)	107 Old Lancaster Road in Devon; 40°02′58″N 75°25′18″W	Easttown Township	
70	Benjamin Rush House	Benjamin Rush House	August 2, 1984 (#84003300)	Boot Road; 40°00′32″N 75°36′17″W	West Whiteland Township	
71	St. Paul's Church	St. Paul's Church	September 6, 1984 (#84003304)	901 East Lincoln Highway near Exton; 40°01′59″N 75°35′26″W	West Whiteland Township	
72	St. Peter's Church in the Great Valley	St. Peter's Church in the Great Valley	November 21, 1977 (#77001155)	South of Phoenixville off Pennsylvania Route 423; 40°04′05″N 75°31′33″W	East Whiteland Township	
73	Schuylkill Navigation Canal, Oakes Reach Section	Schuylkill Navigation Canal, Oakes Reach Section	May 6, 1988 (#88000462)	Northern and eastern bank of Schuylkill River from Pennsylvania Route 113 to Lock 61; 40°08′40″N 75°30′31″W	Phoenixville	Extends into Montgomery County
74	Sharples Homestead	Sharples Homestead	September 19, 1985 (#85002412)	22 Dean Street; 39°57′22″N 75°36′06″W	West Chester	
75	Sharples Separator Works	Sharples Separator Works	June 28, 1984 (#84003214)	North Franklin and Evans Streets; 39°57′52″N 75°36′05″W	West Chester	
76	Ship Inn	Ship Inn	August 2, 1984 (#84003301)	100 North Ship Road near Exton; 40°01′47″N 75°36′39″W	West Whiteland Township	
77	Sleepy Hollow Hall	Sleepy Hollow Hall	August 2, 1984 (#84003302)	109 East Lincoln Highway; 40°01′43″N 75°37′38″W	West Whiteland Township	
78	Solitude Farm	Solitude Farm	August 2, 1984 (#84003303)	Church Farm Road; 40°02′53″N 75°36′11″W	West Whiteland Township	
79	Spring Mill Complex	Spring Mill Complex	December 14, 1978 (#78002370)	Southwest of Devault at the junction of Moores Road and Pennsylvania Route 401; 40°03′09″N 75°33′53″W	East Whiteland Township	
80	Maj. Gen. Lord Stirling Quarters	Maj. Gen. Lord Stirling Quarters	February 15, 1974 (#74000283)	South of Valley Forge on Yellow Springs Road; 40°05′04″N 75°27′46″W	Tredyffrin Township	
81	Oskar G. Stonorov House	Oskar G. Stonorov House	December 6, 1975 (#75001631)	Southwest of Phoenixville on Pickering Road; 40°06′01″N 75°34′21″W	Charlestown Township	
82	Strafford Railroad Station	Strafford Railroad Station	July 26, 1984 (#84003226)	Old Eagle School Road at Strafford; 40°02′58″N 75°24′16″W	Tredyffrin Township	
83	Sugartown Historic District	Sugartown Historic District	September 7, 1984 (#84003230)	Sugartown, Boot, Spring, Dutton Mill, and Providence Roads, near Malvern; 39°59′57″N 75°30′30″W	Willistown Township	
84	Thomas Marble Quarry Houses	Thomas Marble Quarry Houses	August 2, 1984 (#84003306)	Quarry Lane; 40°01′12″N 75°38′19″W	West Whiteland Township	
85	Thomas Mill and Miller's House	Thomas Mill and Miller's House	May 19, 2004 (#04000468)	130 West Lincoln Highway; 40°01′44″N 75°38′00″W	West Whiteland Township	
86	Charles Thomas House	Charles Thomas House	September 6, 1984 (#84003305)	225 North Whitford Road; 40°01′51″N 75°38′56″W	West Whiteland Township	
87	Valley Forge National Historical Park	Valley Forge National Historical Park	October 15, 1966 (#66000657)	Valley Forge State Park; 40°05′48″N 75°26′55″W	Tredyffrin Township	Extends into Upper Merion Township in Montgomery County
88	Gen. Frederick Von Steuben Headquarters	Gen. Frederick Von Steuben Headquarters	November 28, 1972 (#72001108)	Pennsylvania Route 23; 40°05′56″N 75°28′13″W	Schuylkill Township	
89	Joseph Walker House	Joseph Walker House	June 1, 1987 (#86003566)	274 Anthony Wayne Drive; 40°04′36″N 75°26′00″W	Tredyffrin Township	
90	Warner Theater	Warner Theater	November 29, 1979 (#79002207)	120 North High Street; 39°57′40″N 75°36′21″W	West Chester	
91	Waterloo Mills Historic District	Waterloo Mills Historic District	July 21, 1995 (#95000889)	815, 840, 855, and 860 Waterloo Road, near Waterloo Mills; 40°01′25″N 75°25′04″W	Easttown Township	
92	Waynesborough	Waynesborough	March 7, 1973 (#73001603)	2049 Waynesborough Road near Paoli; 40°01′55″N 75°28′26″W	Easttown Township	
93	Wee Grimmet	Wee Grimmet	August 2, 1984 (#84003312)	624 West Lincoln Highway; 40°01′15″N 75°39′42″W	West Whiteland Township	
94	West Chester Boarding School for Boys	West Chester Boarding School for Boys	January 4, 1990 (#89002257)	200 East Biddle Street; 39°57′53″N 75°36′15″W	West Chester	
95	West Chester Downtown Historic District	West Chester Downtown Historic District	July 2, 1985 (#85001447)	Roughly bounded by Biddle, Matlack, Barnard and New Streets; 39°57′37″N 75°36′20″W	West Chester	
96	West Chester State College Quadrangle Historic District	West Chester State College Quadrangle Historic District	October 8, 1981 (#81000539)	Bounded by South High and South Church Streets, College and Rosedale Avenues; 39°57′08″N 75°35′55″W	West Chester	Part of West Chester University, includes the Old Library and Philips Memorial Building
97	West Whiteland Inn	West Whiteland Inn	August 2, 1984 (#84003313)	609 West Lincoln Highway near Exton; 40°01′21″N 75°39′42″W	West Whiteland Township	
98	Wetherby-Hampton-Snyder-Wilson-Erdman Log House	Wetherby-Hampton-Snyder-Wilson-Erdman Log House	April 2, 1973 (#73001613)	251 Irish Road; 40°03′00″N 75°27′25″W	Tredyffrin Township	
99	White Horse Farm	White Horse Farm	July 29, 1987 (#87001206)	54 South Whitehorse Road; 40°07′06″N 75°30′19″W	Schuylkill Township	
100	White Horse Historic District	White Horse Historic District	February 2, 2001 (#01000058)	Junction of Goshen and Providence Roads; 39°59′26″N 75°28′09″W	Willistown Township	
101	White Horse Tavern	White Horse Tavern	December 29, 1978 (#78002373)	Northwest of Malvern at 480 Swedesford Road; 40°02′30″N 75°34′41″W	East Whiteland Township	
102	Hannah White Log House	Hannah White Log House	August 2, 1984 (#84003315)	545 West Boot Road; 40°00′15″N 75°38′15″W	West Whiteland Township	
103	Whitford Garne	Whitford Garne	September 6, 1984 (#84003317)	201 West Boot Road; 40°00′46″N 75°37′34″W	West Whiteland Township	
104	Whitford Hall	Whitford Hall	September 6, 1984 (#84003319)	145 West Lincoln Highway; 40°01′39″N 75°37′58″W	West Whiteland Township	
105	Whitford Station House	Whitford Station House	August 2, 1984 (#84003324)	405 South Whitford Road; 40°00′51″N 75°38′15″W	West Whiteland Township	
106	Williams Deluxe Cabins	Williams Deluxe Cabins	July 28, 1988 (#88001165)	Lincoln Highway; 40°01′59″N 75°37′01″W	West Whiteland Township	
107	Ellis Williams House	Ellis Williams House	August 11, 2004 (#04000835)	1711 East Boot Road; 39°59′58″N 75°31′45″W	East Goshen Township	
108	John Williams Farm	John Williams Farm	December 15, 1978 (#78002377)	South of Phoenixville on Union Hill Road; 40°05′27″N 75°32′19″W	Charlestown Township	
109	Jacob Wisner House	Jacob Wisner House	August 6, 1979 (#79002201)	Northwest of Malvern on Yellow Springs Road; 40°04′23″N 75°34′29″W	Charlestown Township	
110	Woodland Station	Woodland Station	September 6, 1984 (#84003326)	408 King Road; 40°01′13″N 75°34′55″W	West Whiteland Township	
111	Woodledge	Woodledge	July 28, 1988 (#88001161)	525 West Lincoln Highway; 40°01′26″N 75°39′26″W	West Whiteland Township	
112	Zook House	Zook House	July 27, 2000 (#00000844)	100 Exton Square; 40°01′43″N 75°37′34″W	West Whiteland Township	First listed on January 1, 1976. In 1999 the house was moved 300 feet and automatically delisted. In 2000 it was relisted.
113	Jacob Zook House	Jacob Zook House	February 24, 1995 (#95000127)	290 East Lincoln Highway near Exton; 40°01′44″N 75°37′27″W	West Whiteland Township	

== Former listing ==
	Name on the Register	Image	Date listed	Date removed	Location	City or town	Description
1	Bridge in Tredyffrin Township	Bridge in Tredyffrin Township	June 22, 1988 (#88000778)	July 16, 2010	Gulph Road over Trout Run, near Port Kennedy; 40°05′31″N 75°25′20″W	Tredyffrin Township	
2	Old Main, West Chester State College		May 2, 1971 (#74002333)	June 4, 1974	High St. and Rosedale Ave.	West Chester	Demolished in June 1971.
