= Garrett House =

Garrett House may refer to:

- Garrett-Bullock House, Columbus, GA, listed on the NRHP in Georgia
- William Garrett House, Keene, KY, listed on the NRHP in Woodford County, Kentucky
- Louisa Garrett House, Florissant, MO, listed on the NRHP in St. Louis County, Missouri
- Patrick Floyd Garrett House, Roswell, NM, listed on the NRHP in New Mexico
- Garrett House (Syracuse, New York), listed on the NRHP in New York
- Garrett-White House, Colerain, NC, listed on the NRHP in North Carolina
- Garrett-Wiggins-Brown House, Tarboro, NC
- Garrett's Island House, Plymouth, NC, listed on the NRHP in North Carolina
- Garrett Farmstead, Newtown Square, PA, listed on the NRHP in eastern Chester County, Pennsylvania
- Garrett House (Lawrenceburg, Tennessee), listed on the NRHP in Lawrence County, Tennessee
- William Garrett Plantation House, San Augustine, TX, listed on the NRHP in San Augustine County, Texas
- Henry B. Garrett House, Wharton, TX, listed on the NRHP in Wharton County, Texas
- John A. and Sophie Garrett House, Wharton, TX, listed on the NRHP in Wharton County, Texas
