= Zook =

Zook can refer to the following:

== People ==
- Chris Zook, business writer
- John Zook (1947–2020), National Football League player
- Frederic Zook, President of Ottawa University and former mayor of Ottawa, Kansas
- George F. Zook (1885-1951), American educator
- Matthew Zook, geographer
- R. Harold Zook (1889-1949), American architect
- Ron Zook (born 1954), American football coach
- Samuel K. Zook (1821-63), Union army general killed at Gettysburg

== Places ==
- Zook, Kansas, Pawnee County, Kansas
- 14267 Zook, an asteroid

== Entertainment ==
- Zook (band), a Finnish rock band
- Zook (character), a DC Comics alien associated with the Martian Manhunter
- a creature designed by a contestant on the BBC game show Bamzooki
- Zook, someone who eats their bread butter side down in Dr. Seuss's The Butter Battle Book
- Zooks, enemies in the platform video game The Kore Gang
- Zook, a playable character in the Skylanders video game franchise

== See also ==
- Zook House (disambiguation)
- Sook (disambiguation)
