= Zook House =

Zook House may refer to:

- Jacob Zook House, Exton, Pennsylvania, listed on the National Register of Historic Places in Chester County, Pennsylvania
- Zook House (West Whiteland Township, Pennsylvania), listed on the National Register of Historic Places in Chester County, Pennsylvania

== See also ==
- Zook's Mill Covered Bridge, Brownstown, Pennsylvania, in Lancaster County
