= Sook =

Sook may refer to:

== Places ==
- Sook, Sabah, a small town in Interior Division, Sabah, Malaysia
- Sook (state constituency), Sabah, Malaysia
- Sook, New Ireland, Papua New Guinea
- Söök Pass, a mountain pass in Kyrgyzstan

== People ==
- Sook (Korean name), a given name, including a list of people with the name
- Perry Sook, American businessman
- Ryan Sook, American comic book artist
- Söök, a clan among the Turkic-speaking people

== Other uses ==
- Chesapeake Bay waterman's term for the female of the blue crab Callinectes sapidus (males are jimmies)

== See also ==
- Sooke (disambiguation)
- Suk (disambiguation)
- Souk, Arabic term for a marketplace
- Zook (disambiguation)
