= Cramond (Strafford, Pennsylvania) =

Historic house in Pennsylvania, United States

- U.S. National Register of Historic Places
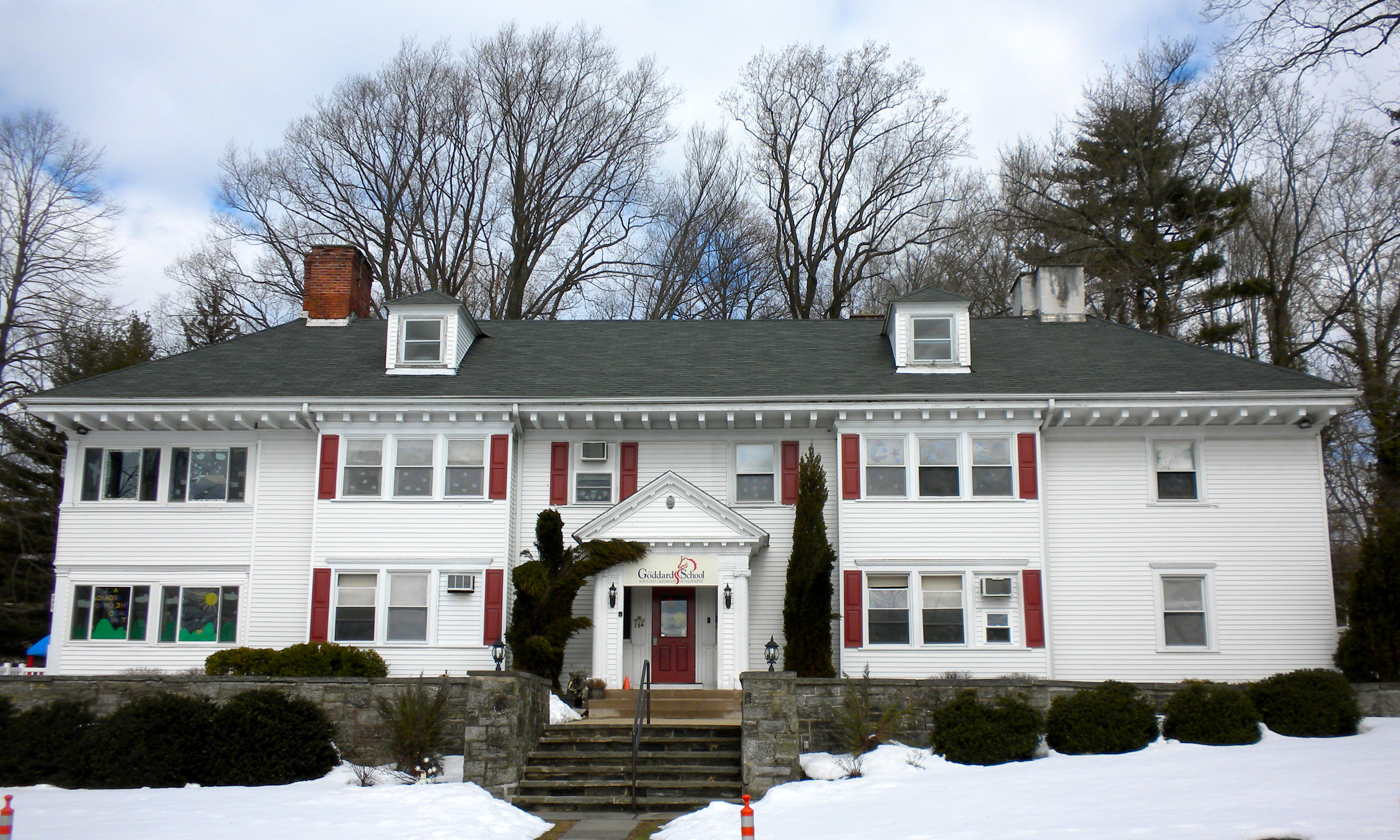
- Cramond, March 2010

- Location within Pennsylvania Location within the United States
- Location: 95 Crestline Rd., near Strafford, Tredyffrin Township, Pennsylvania
- Coordinates: 40°3′1″N 75°24′13″W
- Area: 1.4 acres (0.57 ha)
- Built: 1886
- Architect: McKim, Meade & White
- Architectural style: Classical Revival
- NRHP reference No.: 83002222
- Added to NRHP: June 30, 1983

Cramond is a historic home located in Tredyffrin Township, Chester County, Pennsylvania. It was designed by the architectural firm of McKim, Mead & White in the Classical Revival style. It was built in 1886, and is a 2 1/2-story, six-bay half-timbered dwelling sided in clapboard. It has a hipped roof with a pair of hipped dormers and two large brick chimneys. It is occupied by a private school known as The Goddard School.

It was listed on the National Register of Historic Places in 1983.

== See also ==
- National Register of Historic Places listings in eastern Chester County, Pennsylvania
