= Kirkland station (Pennsylvania) =

- Kirkland Station
- U.S. National Register of Historic Places
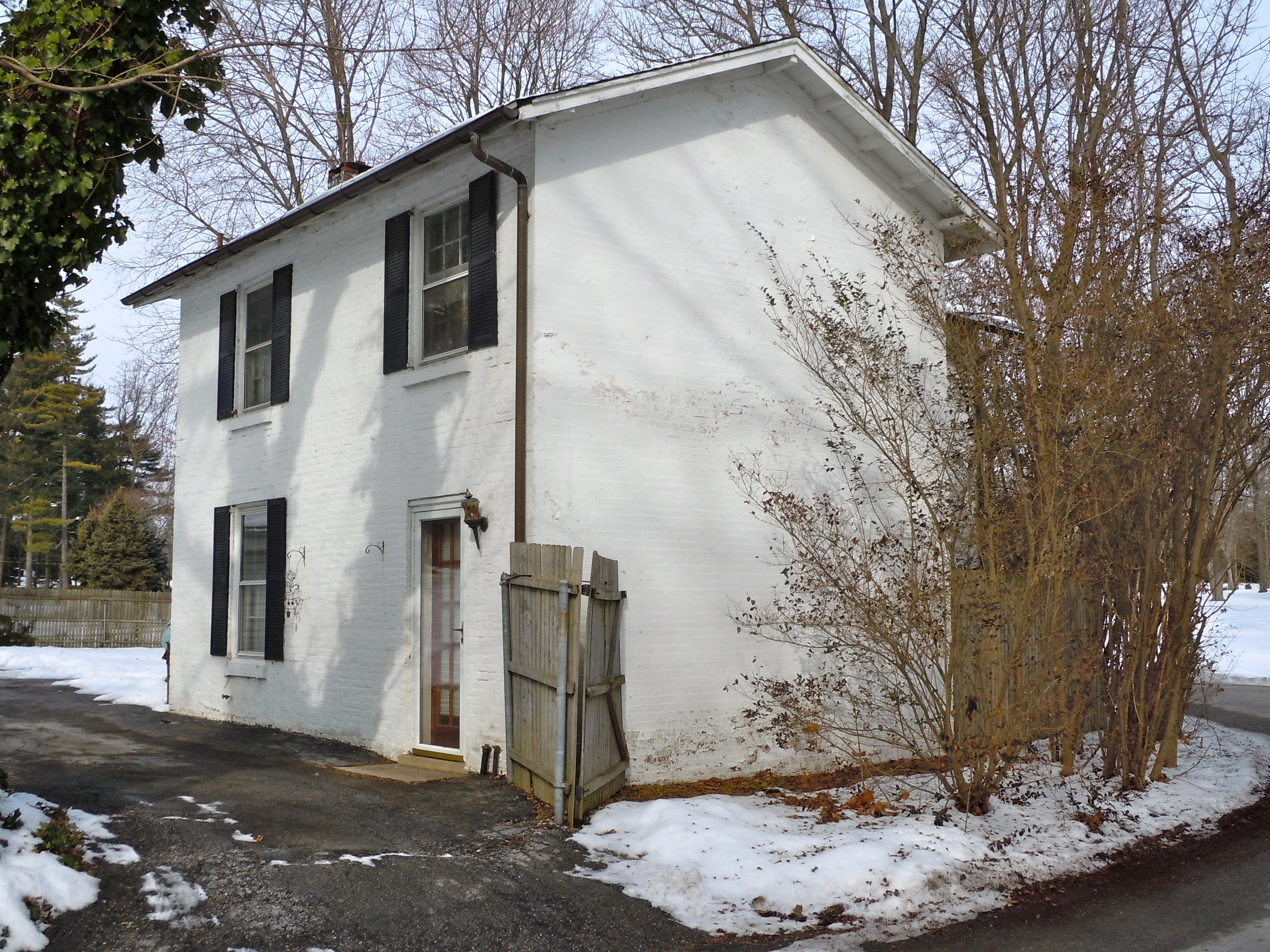
- Kirkland Station, January 2011

- Location within Pennsylvania Location within the United States
- Location: 1370 Kirkland Ave., West Whiteland Township, Pennsylvania
- Coordinates: 40°0′38″N 75°36′8″W
- Area: 2.9 acres (1.2 ha)
- MPS: West Whiteland Township MRA
- NRHP reference No.: 83004209
- Added to NRHP: November 10, 1983

Kirkland is a historic railway station located in West Whiteland Township, Chester County, Pennsylvania. It was built between 1860 and 1879, and is a two-story, brick building. A small two-story, one room addition was built in the early-19th century. It was moved to its present location in 1880, when the Pennsylvania Railroad straightened the track at Kirkland. The building served as a ticket office and residence for the agent.

It was listed on the National Register of Historic Places in 1983 as Kirkland Station.

Preceding station	Pennsylvania Railroad	Following station
Morstein toward Frazer	Frazer – West Chester	Green Hill toward West Chester
