= Zook House (West Whiteland Township, Pennsylvania) =

Historic houses in Pennsylvania, United States

- U.S. National Register of Historic Places
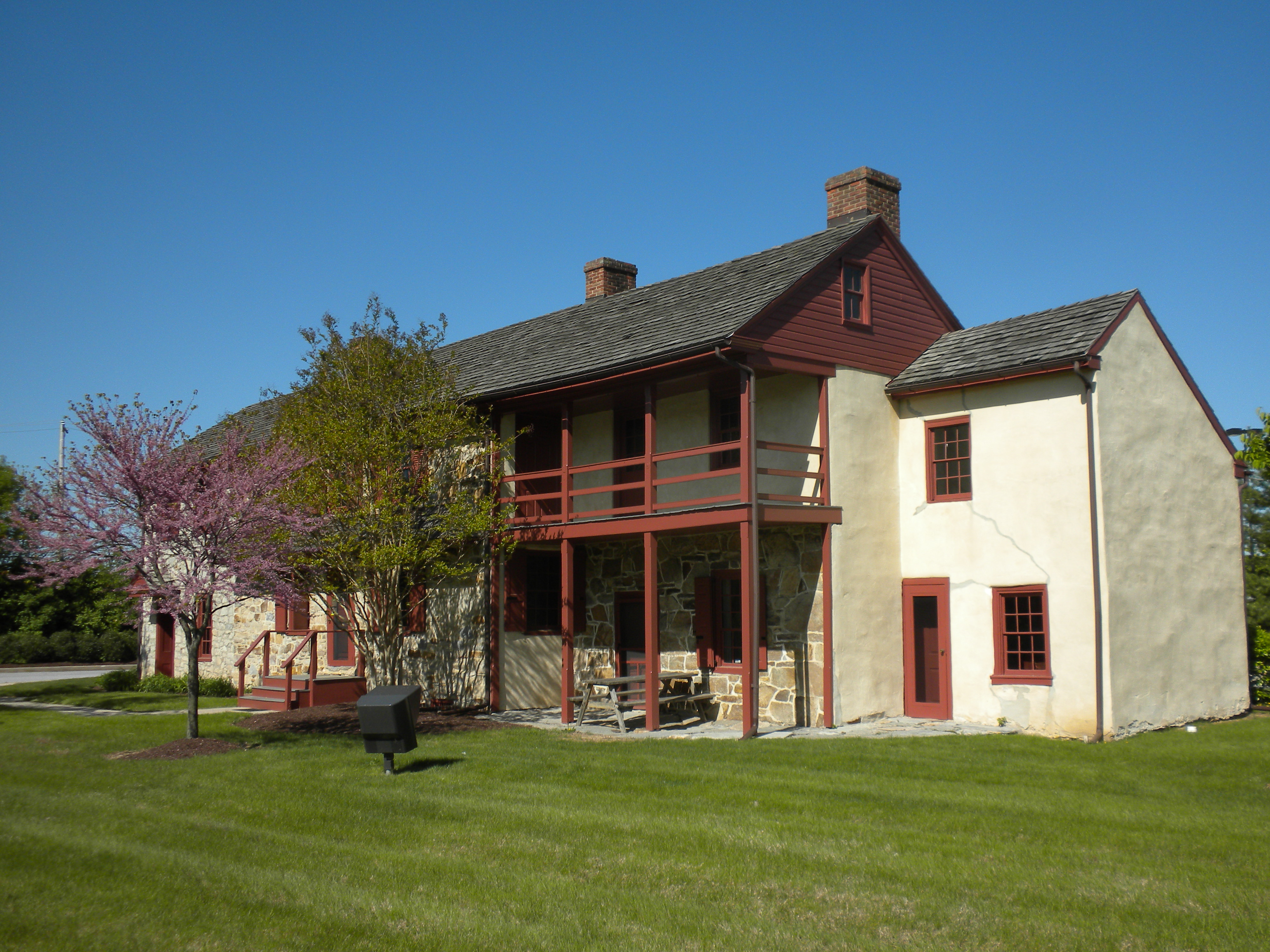

- Location within Pennsylvania Location within the United States
- Location: 100 Exton Sq., Exton, West Whiteland Township, Pennsylvania
- Coordinates: 40°1′43″N 75°37′34″W
- Area: less than one acre
- Built: 1750
- Architectural style: Additive dwelling
- MPS: West Whiteland Township MRA
- NRHP reference No.: 00000844
- Added to NRHP: July 27, 2000

The Zook House, also known as the William and Elizabeth Owen House, built in 1750, is a historic single-family dwelling located near Exton, Pennsylvania on the property of the Exton Square Mall, on the north side of U.S. Route 30 Business. It was first listed on the National Register of Historic Places on January 1, 1976, following renovations. In 1984 a boundary increase was also listed on the National Register. In 1998 the house was moved about 300 feet to the southwest due to an expansion of the shopping mall. On July 27, 2000, the house was re-listed on the National Register, even though it remains listed on the Register at its old address.

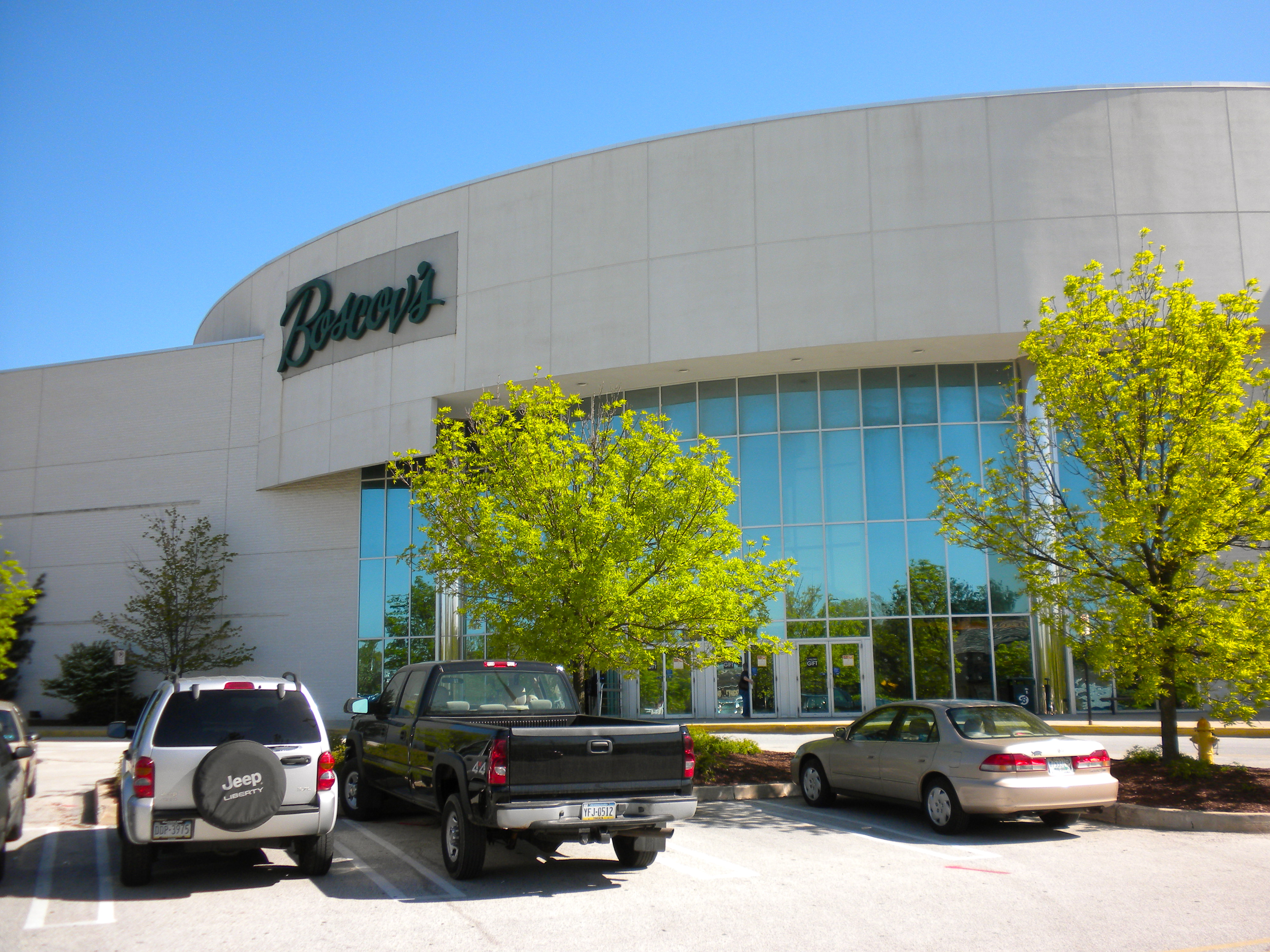
Former location of the house, about 300 feet northeast of the current site.

The land in the area of the house was first sold by William Penn to Welch Quaker Richard Thomas in 1683 as part of the Welsh Tract. Thomas's son, also named Richard, claimed the land in two stages, 1704 and 1717. He sold the land to English Quaker John Morgan in 1718, and Morgan sold the land to English Quaker William Owen in 1734. Owen built the house in 1750 and sold land and the house to Quaker James Brown in 1760. Morritz (or Morris) Zug bought the farm and house in 1770. Morritz Zug later anglicized his name to Zook. He and his family were founding members of the Great Valley Ominist (Amish) Society. The house was added to in 1800, and 1820. During the 1998 move, a new foundation was laid and the 1750 basement was lost.

Six generations of the Zook family lived in the house until 1970. The Jacob Zook House, nearby on the south side of U.S. 30 Business, is listed separately on the National Register of Historic Places.

== See also ==
National Register of Historic Places listings in Eastern Chester County, Pennsylvania
