= Sooke (disambiguation) =

Sooke is a district municipality in British Columbia, Canada. It can also refer to:

- East Sooke, a community southeast of Sooke
- Sooke Basin
- Sooke Formation, a geologic formation
- Sooke Lake
- T'Sou-ke Nation, also known as Sooke First Nation, a Coast Salish peoples and namesake of the District of Sooke
  - T'Sou-ke dialect, also known as Sooke, dialect of the T'Sou-ke people

== People ==
- Alastair Sooke (born 1981), English art critic, journalist, and broadcaster

== See also ==
- Sook (disambiguation)
