= Sleepy Hollow Hall =

Historic house in Pennsylvania, United States

- U.S. National Register of Historic Places
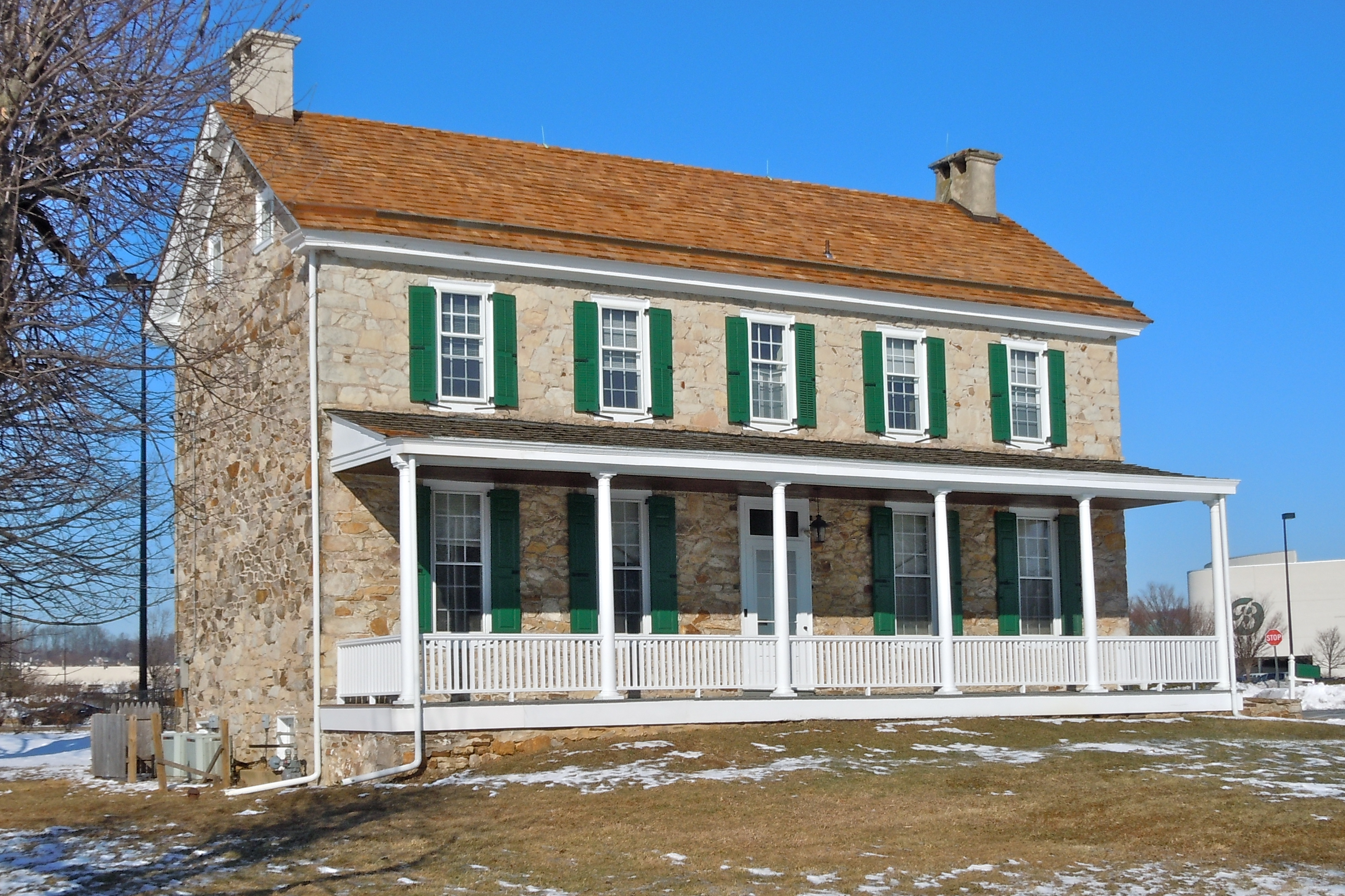
- Sleepy Hallow Hall, January 2011

- Location within Pennsylvania Location within the United States
- Location: 109 E. Lincoln Hwy., West Whiteland Township, Pennsylvania
- Coordinates: 40°1′43″N 75°37′38″W
- Area: 5.5 acres (2.2 ha)
- Built: c. 1717, c. 1810-1820
- Architectural style: Colonial, Federal
- MPS: West Whiteland Township MRA
- NRHP reference No.: 84003302
- Added to NRHP: August 2, 1984

Sleepy Hollow Hall is a historic home located in West Whiteland Township, Chester County, Pennsylvania. It is a two-story, five-bay, L-shaped Federal style dwelling. The oldest section dates to 1717 and is a 20-by-19-foot section at the end of the ell. The main section was built between 1810 and 1820.

It was listed on the National Register of Historic Places in 1984.
