= Pickwick (West Whiteland Township, Pennsylvania) =

Historic house in Pennsylvania, United States

- U.S. National Register of Historic Places
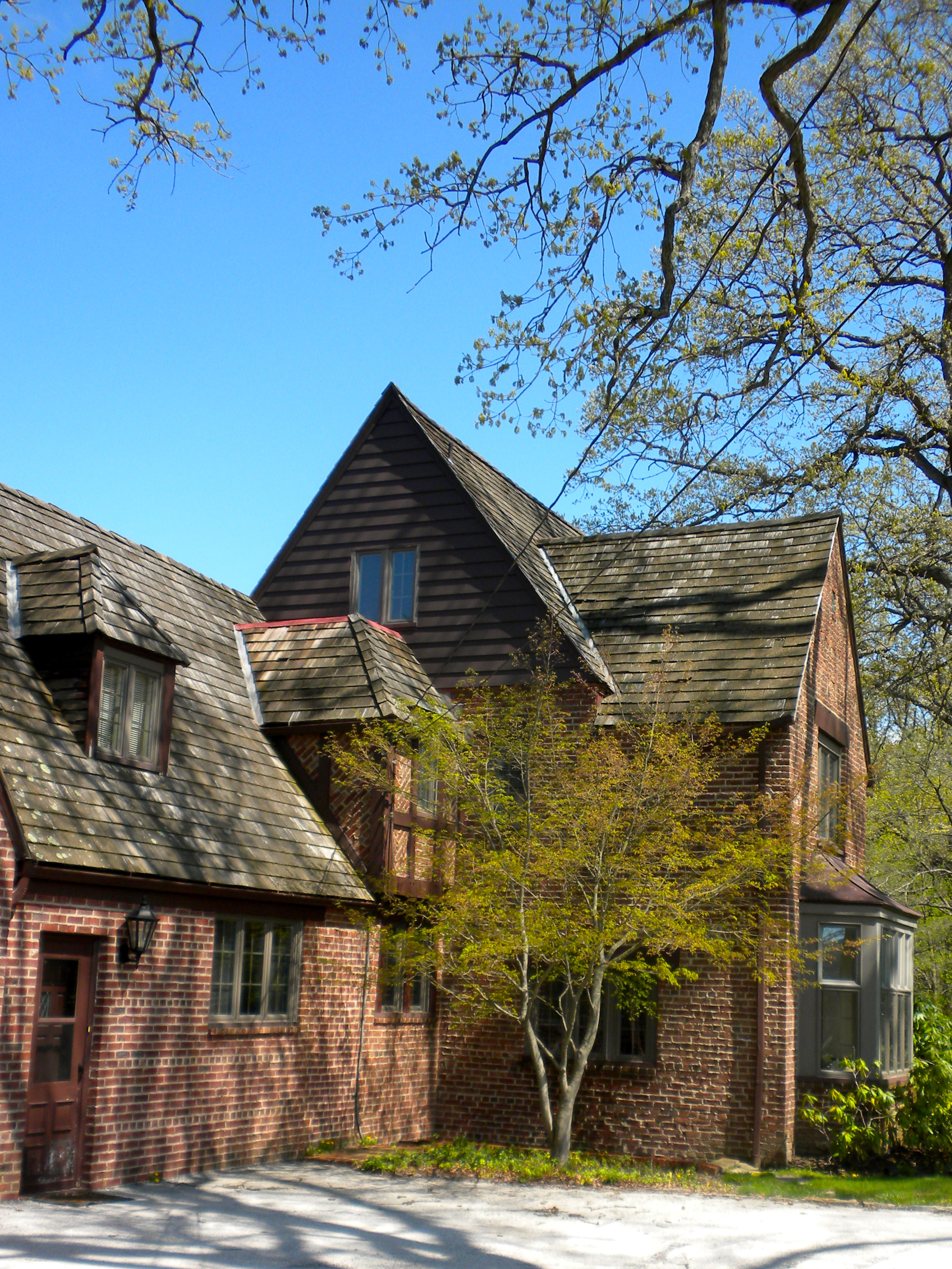
- Pickwick, April 2010

- Location within Pennsylvania Location within the United States
- Location: N side of Swedesford Rd., West Whiteland Township, Pennsylvania
- Coordinates: 40°2′28″N 75°35′40″W
- Area: 2 acres (0.81 ha)
- Built: 1930
- Architect: Coates, Sherman G.
- Architectural style: Tudor Revival
- MPS: West Whiteland Township MRA
- NRHP reference No.: 88001163
- Added to NRHP: July 28, 1988

Pickwick, also known as the John Kent Kane Jr. House, is a historic estate home located in West Whiteland Township, Chester County, Pennsylvania. The house was built in 1930 in the Tudor Revival style. It consists of a 2 1/2-story, T-shaped main block flanked by a 1 1/2-story, kitchen wing and 1 1/2-story garage. It features half-timbering and projecting 1 1/2-story dormer on the south facade.

It was listed on the National Register of Historic Places in 1988.
