= Ship Inn (Pennsylvania) =

- U.S. National Register of Historic Places
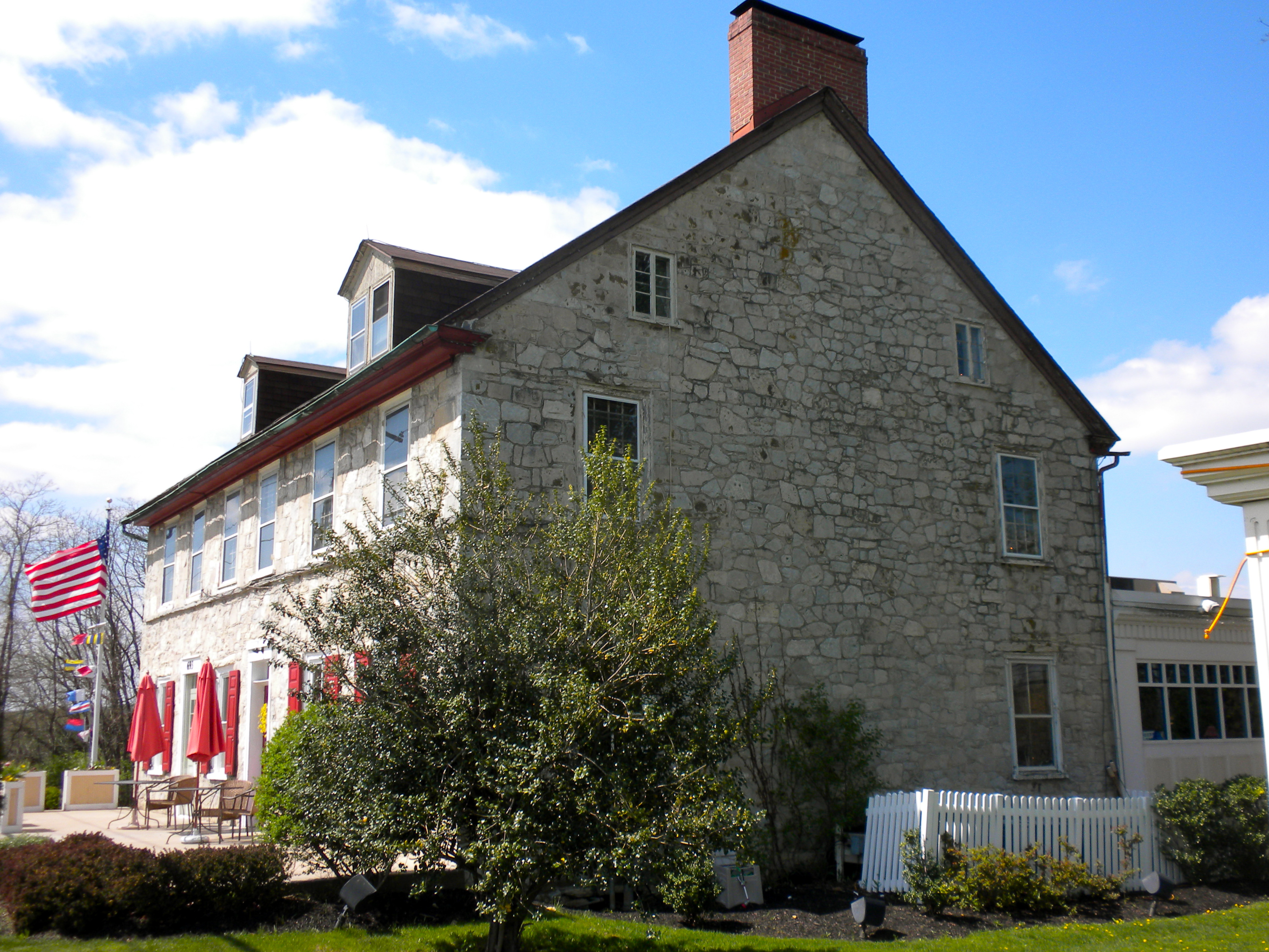
- Ship Inn, April 2010

- Location within Pennsylvania Location within the United States
- Location: 100 North Ship Road, West Whiteland Township, Pennsylvania
- Coordinates: 40°1′48.5″N 75°36′36.3″W
- Area: 1.2 acres (0.49 ha)
- Built: 1796
- Built by: Bowen, John
- Architectural style: Georgian, Federal
- MPS: West Whiteland Township MRA
- NRHP reference No.: 84003301
- Added to NRHP: August 2, 1984

The Ship Inn is a historic inn and tavern in West Whiteland Township, Pennsylvania, United States.

It was listed on the National Register of Historic Places in 1984.

== History and architectural features ==
Built in 1796, it is a two-story, six-bay, Georgian-style stone building with brick chimneys. The main block measures fifty feet by thirty-seven feet, with a rear kitchen wing measuring twenty-nine feet by twenty feet. It remained in operation as an inn until 1854. During the twentieth century, a restaurant opened in the building. Since 2022, the building has operated as a brewery and restaurant known as VK Brewing Co. & Eatery.
