= Oaklands (West Whiteland Township, Pennsylvania) =

Historic house in Pennsylvania, United States

- U.S. National Register of Historic Places
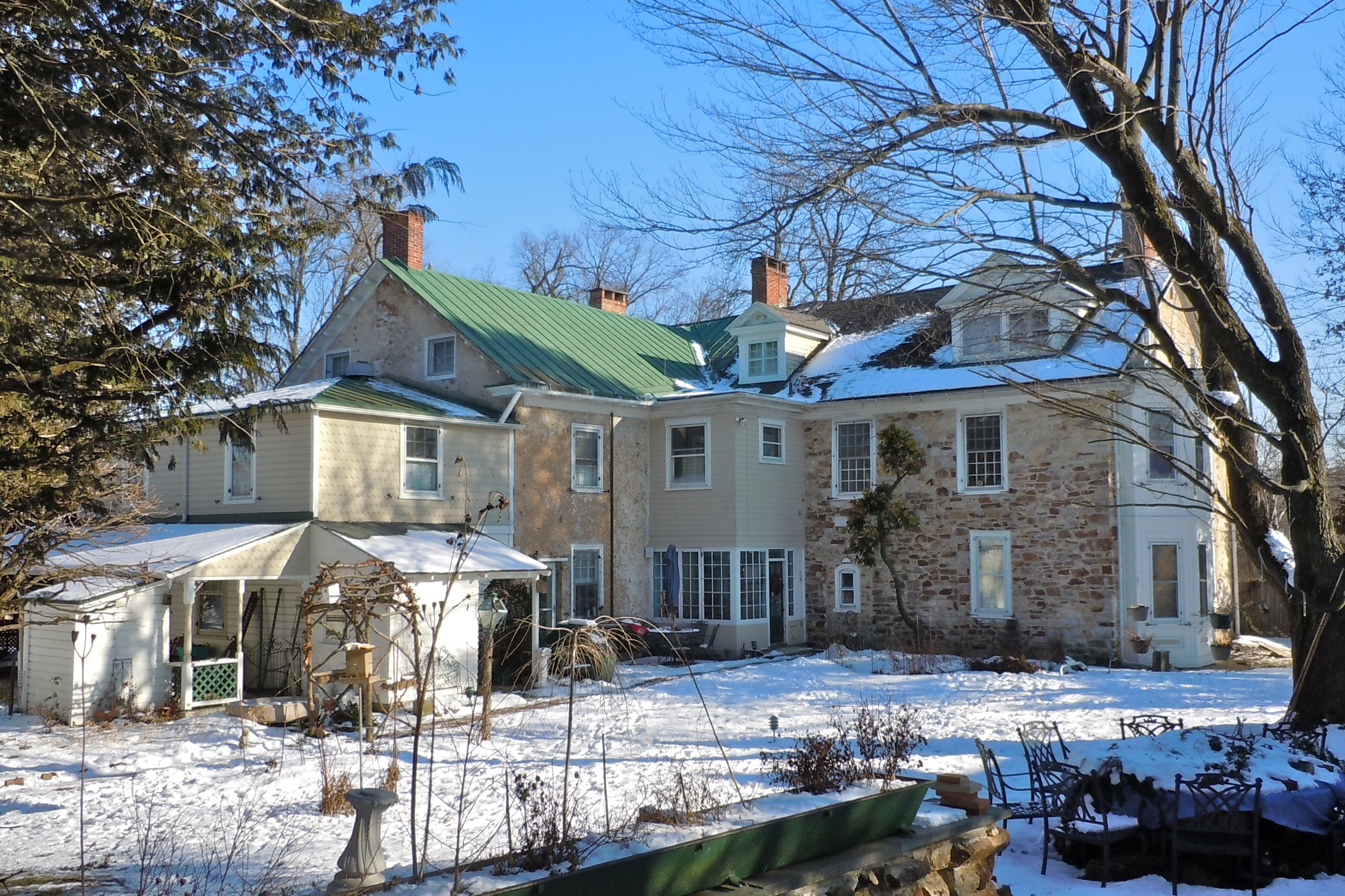
- Oaklands rear view, January 2011

- Location within Pennsylvania Location within the United States
- Location: 349 W. Lincoln Hwy., West Whiteland Township, Pennsylvania
- Coordinates: 40°1′31″N 75°38′37″W
- Area: 1.2 acres (0.49 ha)
- Built: 1772
- Built by: Thomas, George
- Architectural style: Colonial
- MPS: West Whiteland Township MRA
- NRHP reference No.: 84003295
- Added to NRHP: September 6, 1984

Oaklands is an historic home that is located in West Whiteland Township, Chester County, Pennsylvania, United States.

It was listed on the National Register of Historic Places in 1984.

== History and architectural features ==
The original house was built in 1772, and is a two-story, three-bay, rectangular, stone structure. It has a major wing to the east, with an addition to that wing. The front of the wing has a two-story front porch with decorative iron supports. Also located on the property is a contributing one-and-one-half-story, stuccoed, stone gatehouse that was remodeled in 1900 as a private school for the Thomas children.
