= New Century Clubhouse =

- U.S. National Register of Historic Places
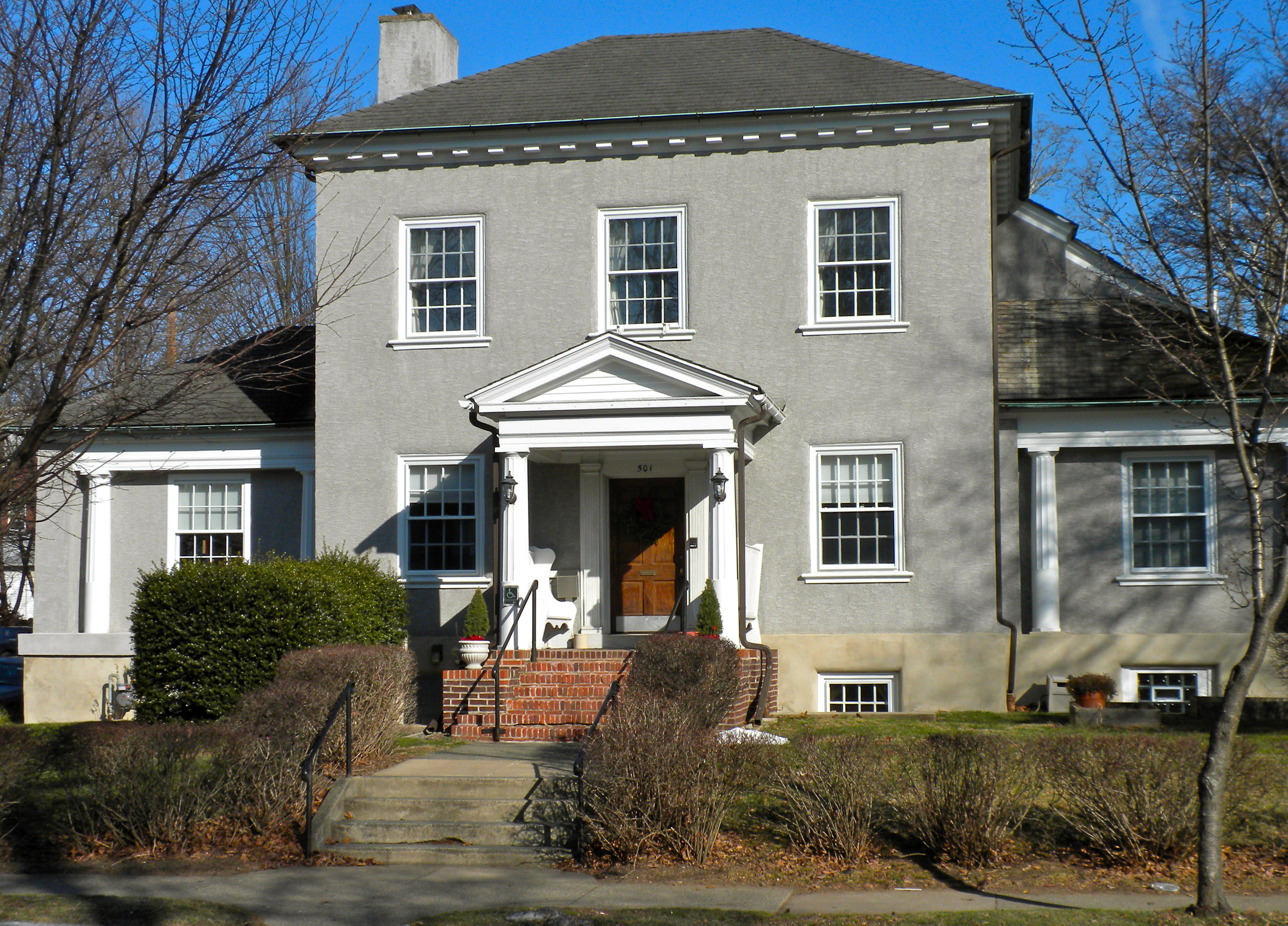
- New Century Clubhouse, January 2010

- Location within Pennsylvania Location within the United States
- Location: 501 South High Street, West Chester, Pennsylvania
- Coordinates: 39.955388°N 75.599447°W
- Area: 0.2 acres (0.081 ha)
- Built: 1914
- Built by: Burns, Joseph M.
- Architect: White, Ralph E.
- Architectural style: Colonial Revival
- NRHP reference No.: 83002225
- Added to NRHP: February 24, 1983

The New Century Clubhouse, also known as Square House, is an historic clubhouse for a local women's club in West Chester, Chester County, Pennsylvania, United States.

It was listed on the National Register of Historic Places in 1983.

== History and architectural features ==
Built in 1914, this historic structure is a two-story, T-shaped, stuccoed building with flanking one-story wings. Designed in the Colonial Revival style, it sits on a raised basement and has a hipped roof. The front entrance features a porch with Doric order columns. The five-bay, rear wing houses an auditorium with stage and dressing rooms. As of January 2010, the building was being used by a Unitarian church.
