= Exton Hotel =

- U.S. National Register of Historic Places
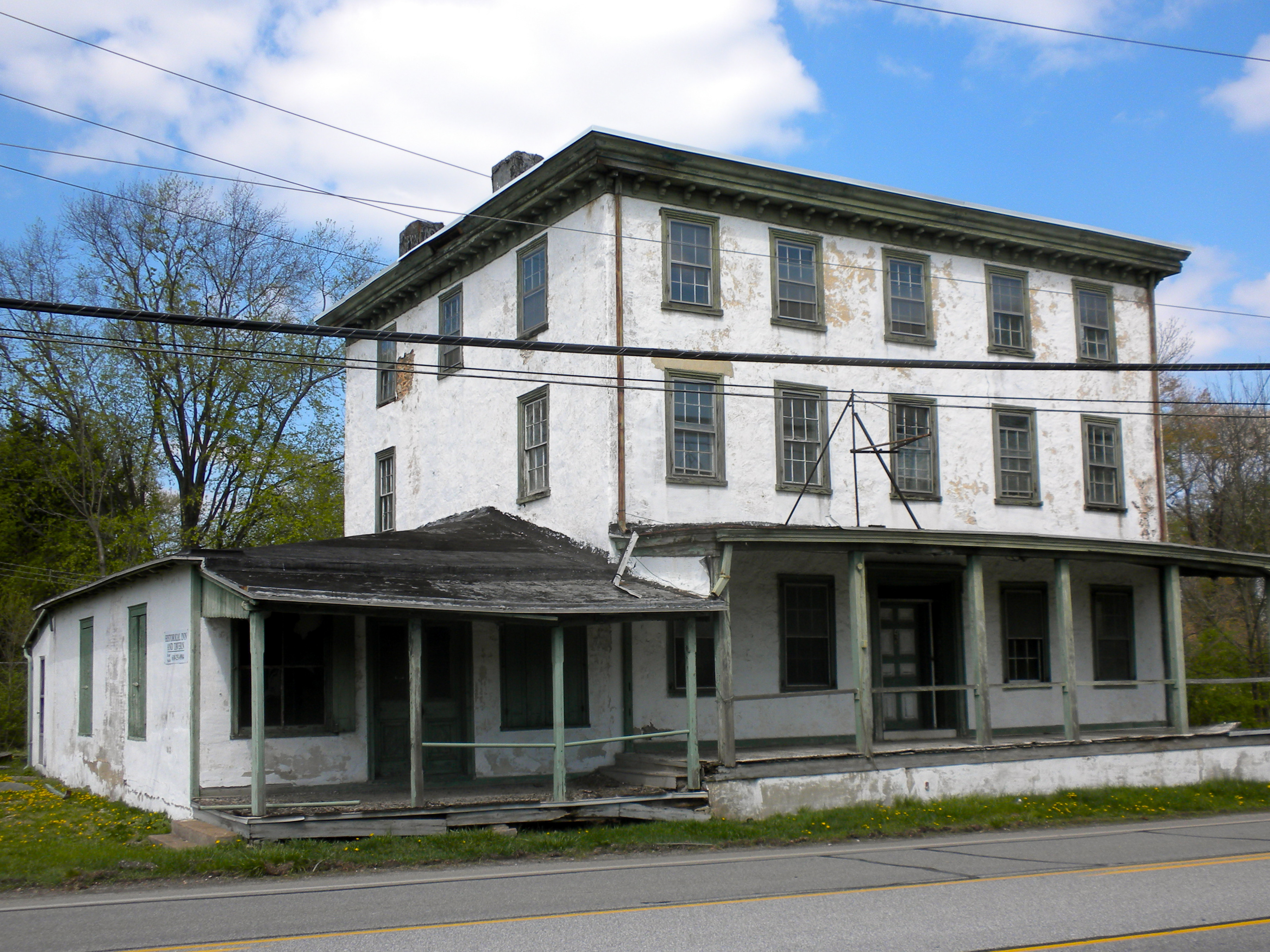
- Exton Hotel, April 2010

- Location within Pennsylvania Location within the United States
- Location: 423 E. Lincoln Hwy., West Whiteland Township, Pennsylvania
- Coordinates: 40°1′45″N 75°37′6″W
- Area: 1.1 acres (0.45 ha)
- Built: 1859
- Architectural style: Italianate
- MPS: West Whiteland Township MRA
- NRHP reference No.: 83004201
- Added to NRHP: November 1, 1983

Exton Hotel, also known as Exton House and Ship Station, is a historic hotel located in West Whiteland Township, Chester County, Pennsylvania. It was built in 1859, and is a three-story, five-bay, stuccoed-stone building with a full-width porch in the Italianate style. It has a one-story addition. For several years it housed a ticket office for the adjacent Chester Valley Railroad.

It was listed on the National Register of Historic Places in 1983.
