= Benjamin Rush House =

Historic house in Pennsylvania, United States

- U.S. National Register of Historic Places
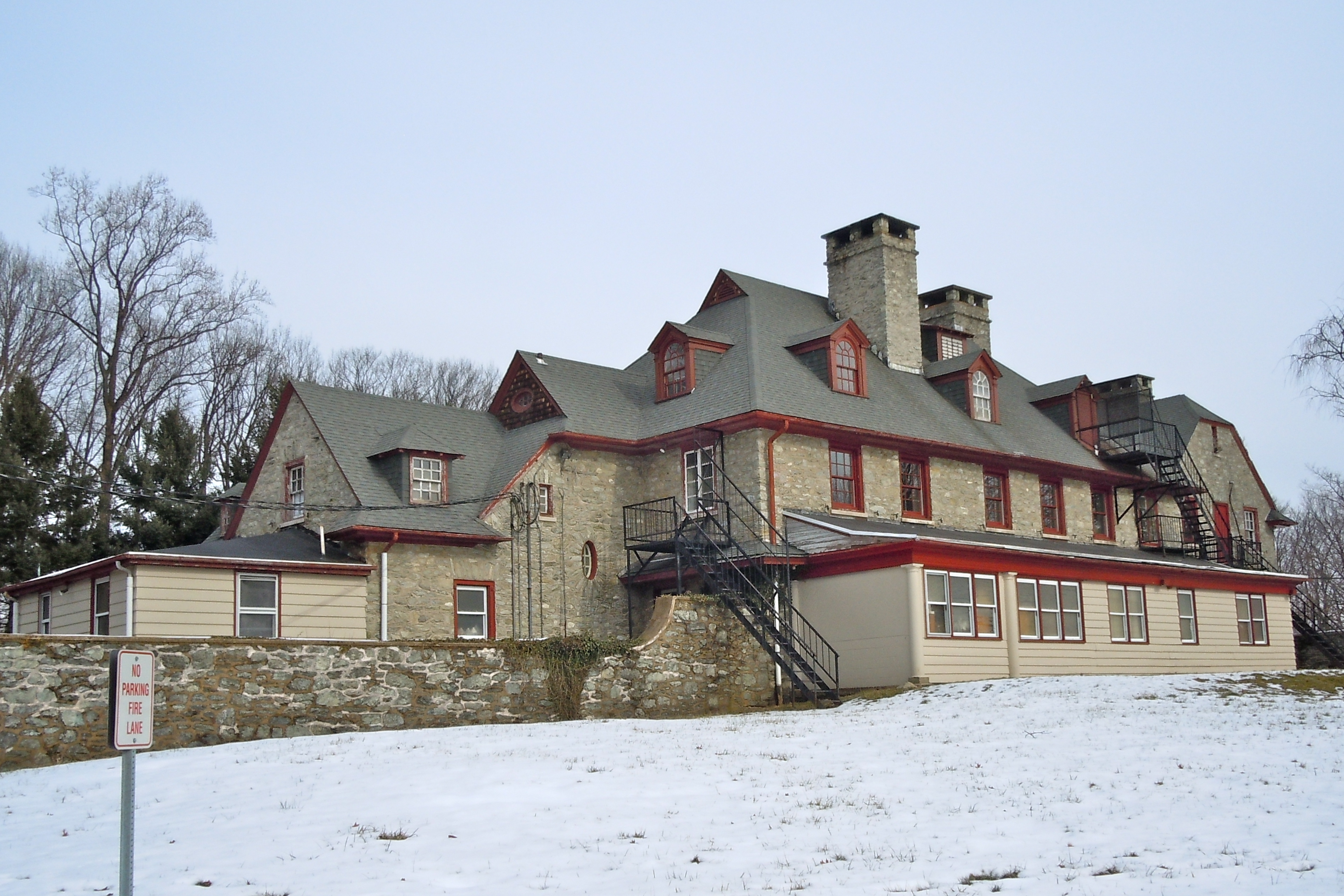
- Benjamin Rush House, January 2011

- Location within Pennsylvania Location within the United States
- Location: Boot Rd., West Whiteland Township, Pennsylvania
- Coordinates: 40°0′32″N 75°36′17″W
- Area: 1.4 acres (0.57 ha)
- Built: 1908
- Architect: George Bispham Page
- Architectural style: Colonial Revival, Other, Georgian Revival
- MPS: West Whiteland Township MRA
- NRHP reference No.: 84003300
- Added to NRHP: August 2, 1984

Benjamin Rush House, also known as Chesteridge, is a historic home located in West Whiteland Township, Chester County, Pennsylvania. It was built in 1908 as a summer home for an insurance company president named Benjamin Rush. It is a 2 1/2-story, six-bay dwelling built of green serpentine stone and fieldstone in the Georgian Revival style. It has a 1 1/2-story service wing and a 2-story library wing, added in 1928.

It was listed on the National Register of Historic Places in 1984.
