= Garrett Farmstead =

Historic house and gristmill in Pennsylvania, United States

- U.S. National Register of Historic Places
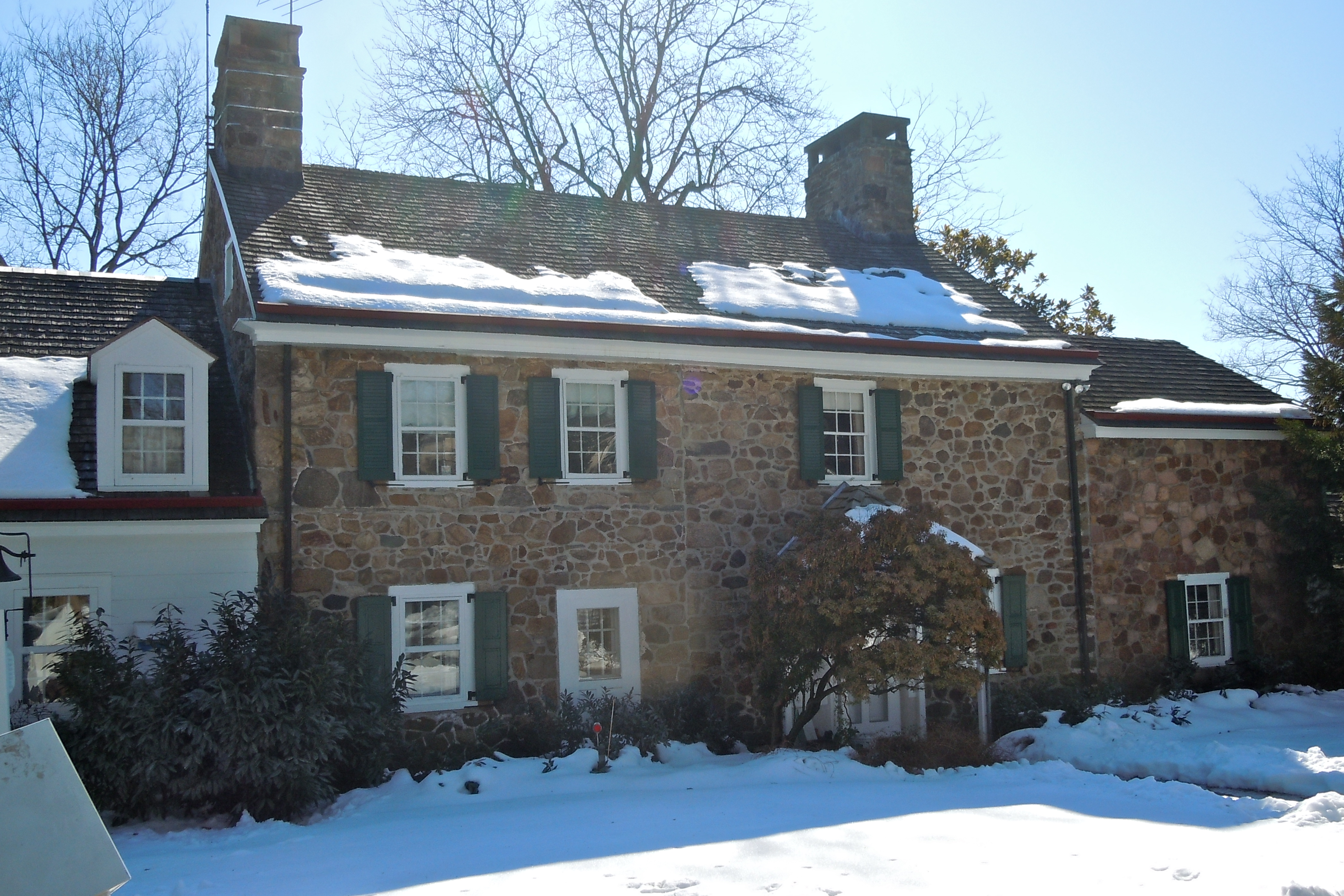
- Garrett Farmhouse in 2011

- Location within Pennsylvania Location within the United States
- Location: 808 and 816 Warren Ave. Malvern, PA 19355 USA
- Coordinates: 39°59′41″N 75°29′19″W
- Built: 1802
- Architect: Isaac Garrett; Amos Garrett
- Architectural style: Colonial/Second Empire
- NRHP reference No.: 03000076
- Added to NRHP: February 27, 2003

The Garrett Farmstead is an historic farmhouse which is located in Willistown Township, Chester County, Pennsylvania.

The Garrett Farmstead was listed on the National Register of Historic Places on February 27, 2003.

== History and architectural features ==
Constructed by Isaac and Amos Garrett near Ridley Creek circa 1802. The Garretts were members of a prominent local Quaker family, who in 1684 had originally purchase a large 1,000 acre tract of land from John Love, who had first purchased the property from William Penn.

== See also ==
- National Register of Historic Places listings in eastern Chester County, Pennsylvania
