= Woodledge =

Historic house in Pennsylvania, United States

- U.S. National Register of Historic Places
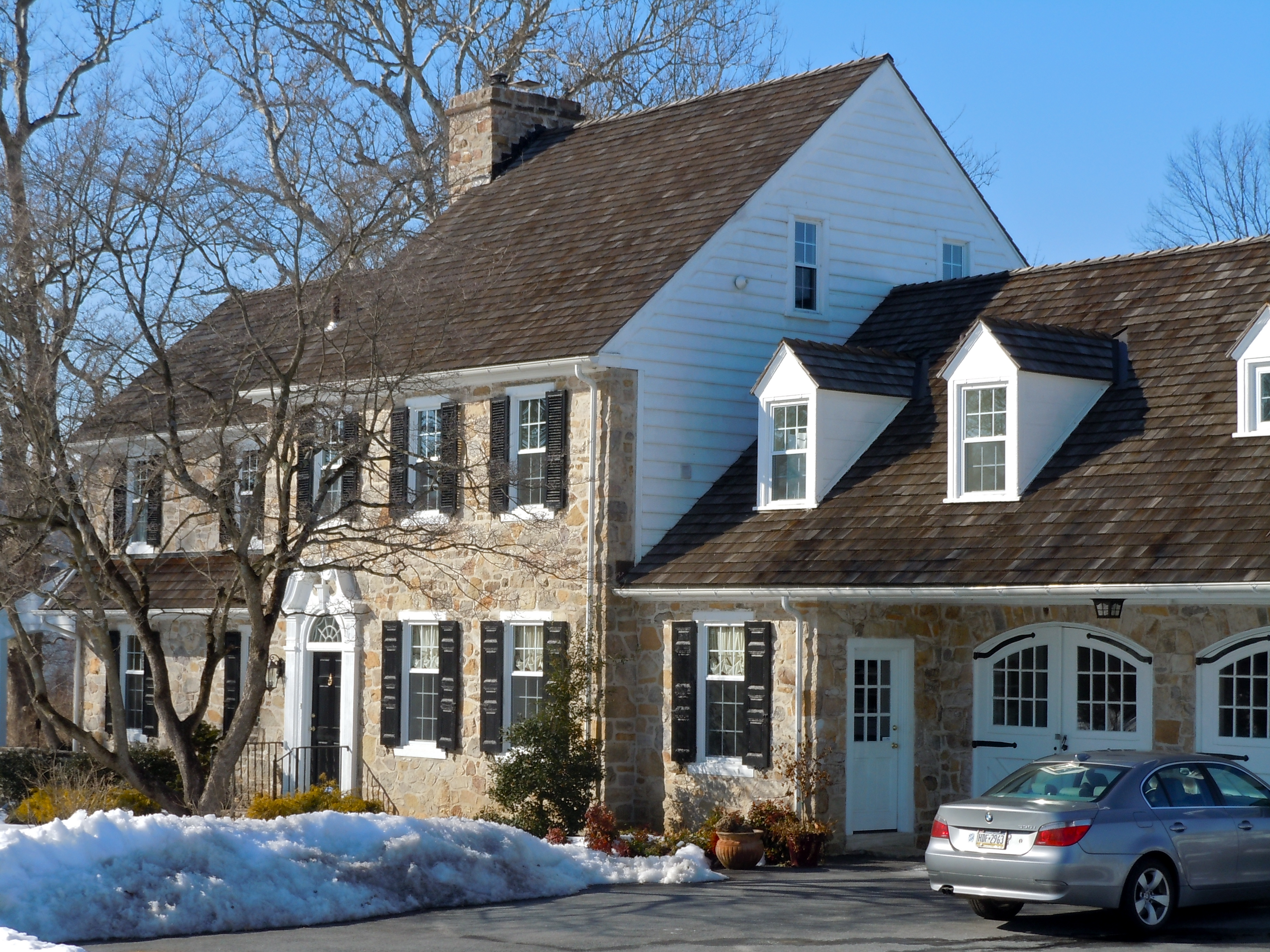
- Woodledge

- Location within Pennsylvania
- Location: 525 W. Lincoln Hwy., West Whiteland Township, Pennsylvania
- Coordinates: 40°1′26″N 75°39′26″W
- Area: 2.8 acres (1.1 ha)
- Built: 1935
- Architect: Minich, Ralph P.
- Architectural style: Colonial Revival
- MPS: West Whiteland Township MRA
- NRHP reference No.: 88001161
- Added to NRHP: July 28, 1988

Woodledge is an historic home that is located in West Whiteland Township, Chester County, Pennsylvania, United States.

It was listed on the National Register of Historic Places in 1988.

== History and architectural features ==
This historic house was built in 1935. Designed in the Colonial Revival style, it consists of a 2 1/2-story, three-bay, main block that is flanked by a two-story, two-bay wing and garage. All of the home's exterior walls were built using pointed stone, with the exception of the main block's eastern gable, which was "sheathed with beaded horizontal board." The main entrance, which is located in the central block's western bay, has "a bold surround with a curved broken pediment" and "a semi-circular fanlight with tracery." Each window on the home's south facade features working shutters. Also located on the property is a one-story, stone and frame stable.
