= Colebrook Manor =

Historic house in Pennsylvania, United States

- U.S. National Register of Historic Places
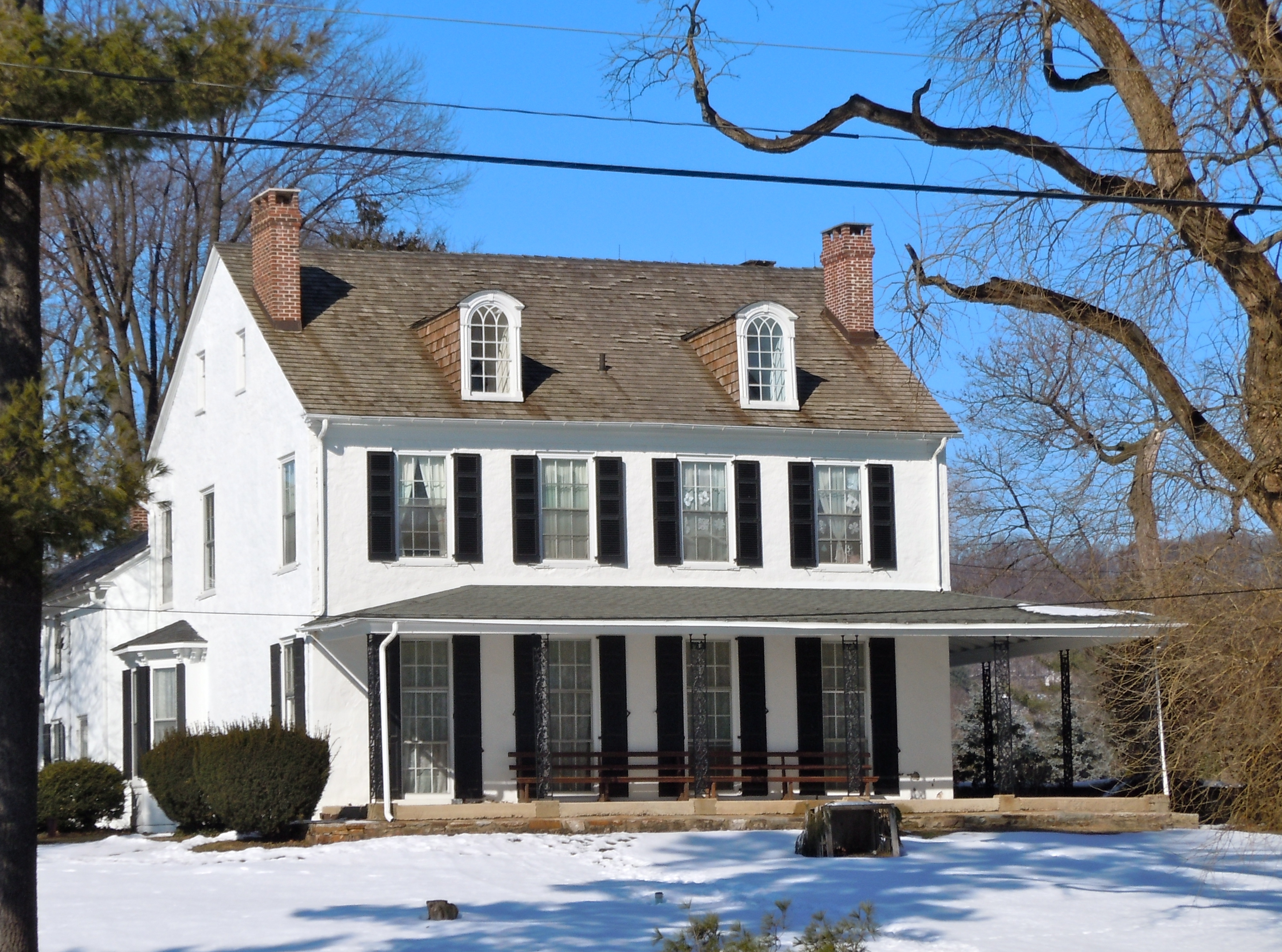
- Colebrook Manor, February 2011

- Location within Pennsylvania Location within the United States
- Location: 637 W. Lincoln Hwy., West Whiteland Township, Pennsylvania
- Coordinates: 40°1′22″N 75°39′52″W
- Area: 14 acres (5.7 ha)
- Built: 1840
- MPS: West Whiteland Township MRA
- NRHP reference No.: 84003239
- Added to NRHP: September 6, 1984

Colebrook Manor is a historic home located in West Whiteland Township, Chester County, Pennsylvania. The house was built about 1840. It consists of a 2 1/2-story, double-pile stuccoed stone central block with a two-story stone service wing with frame addition. It has a slate-covered gable roof with arched dormers. It features a verandah with wrought iron columns. Also on the property are a contributing barn and kennels.

It was listed on the National Register of Historic Places in 1984.
