= Daniel Meredith House =

Historic house in Pennsylvania, United States

- U.S. National Register of Historic Places
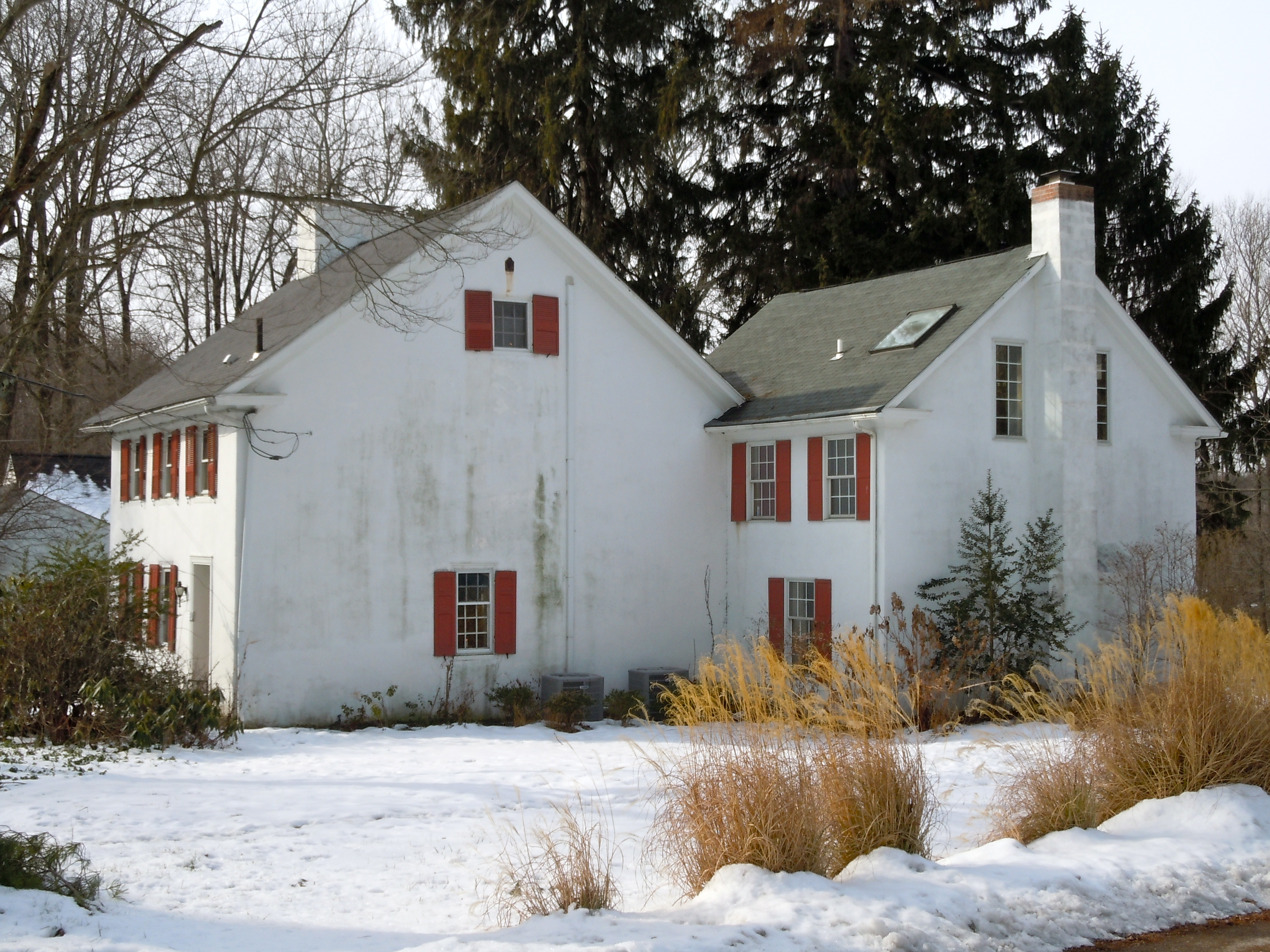
- Daniel Meredith House, January 2011

- Location within Pennsylvania Location within the United States
- Location: 1358 Glen Echo Rd., West Whiteland Township, Pennsylvania
- Coordinates: 40°0′15″N 75°36′39″W
- Area: 2.5 acres (1.0 ha)
- Built: c. 1815
- Architectural style: Georgian
- MPS: West Whiteland Township MRA
- NRHP reference No.: 84003291
- Added to NRHP: August 2, 1984

Daniel Meredith House is a historic home located in West Whiteland Township, Chester County, Pennsylvania. It was built about 1815, and is a two-story, three-bay, double pile side hall stone dwelling in the 2/3 Georgian style. Also on the property is a contributing 19th century spring house and ruins of a barn.

It was listed on the National Register of Historic Places in 1984.
