= Hannah White Log House =

Historic house in Pennsylvania, United States

- U.S. National Register of Historic Places
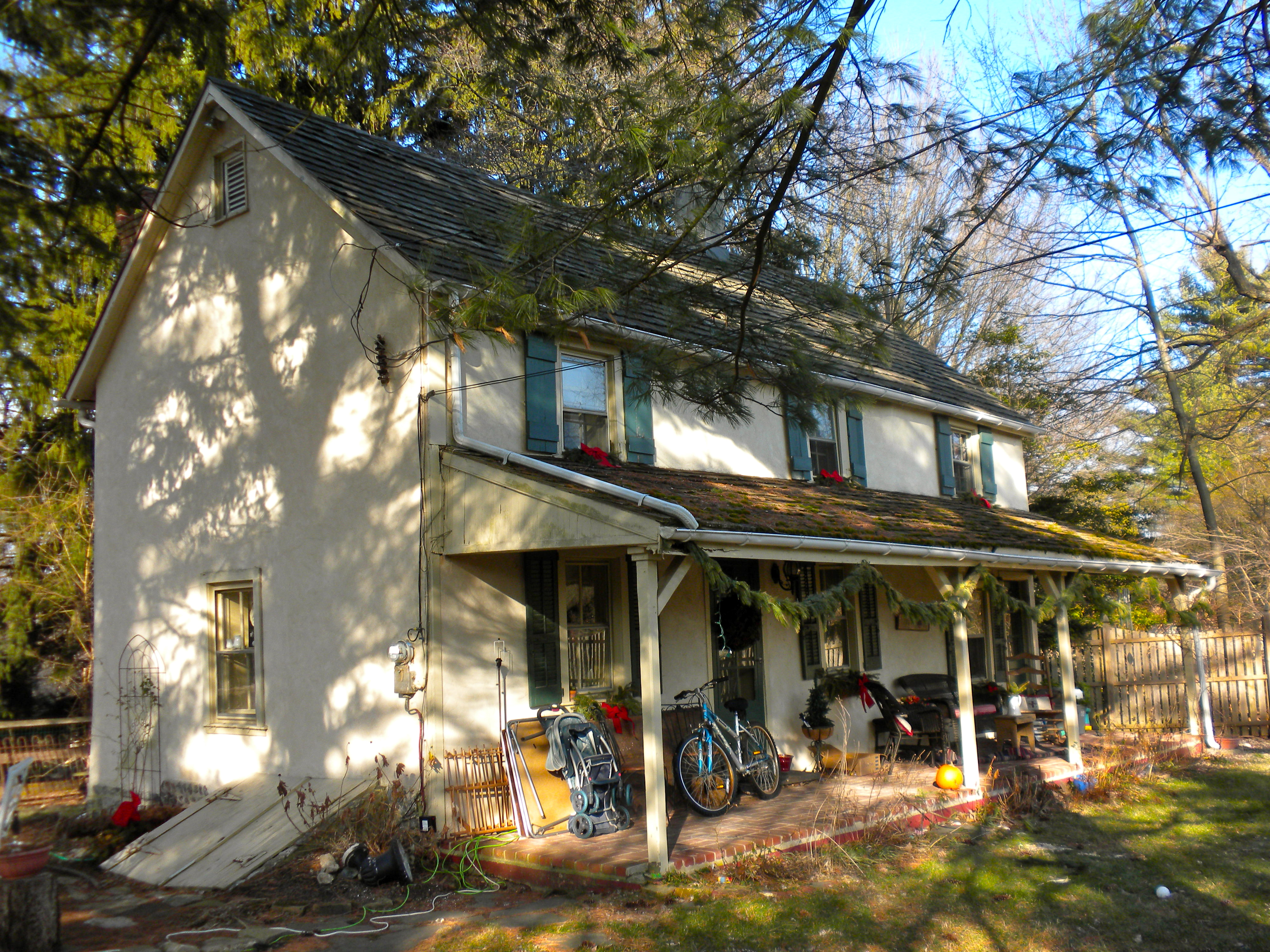
- Hannah White Log House, January 2010

- Location within Pennsylvania Location within the United States
- Interactive map showing the location of Hannah White Log House
- Location: 545 W. Boot Rd., West Whiteland Township, Pennsylvania
- Coordinates: 40°0′15″N 75°38′15″W
- Area: 0.4 acres (0.16 ha)
- Built: c. 1795
- MPS: West Whiteland Township MRA
- NRHP reference No.: 84003315
- Added to NRHP: August 2, 1984

The Hannah White Log House is an historic home which is located in West Whiteland Township, Chester County, Pennsylvania.

It was listed on the National Register of Historic Places in 1984.

== History and architectural features ==
The original owner of the land on which this historic home was built was John Willday (1768-1795). The house was built in 1795, and is a two-story, three-bay, red oak log structure with a full basement. The logs are covered with stucco.
