= Frederic Zook =

Frederick Zook is a former president of Ottawa University. He had previously held the position of provost of the Arizona Campus of Ottawa University from 1981 to 2001. Previous to that, Zook was a dean of students and faculty member of the campus in Ottawa, Kansas. Zook has also been a city council member and the mayor of the City of Ottawa.
