= Kinbawn =

Historic house in Pennsylvania, United States

- U.S. National Register of Historic Places
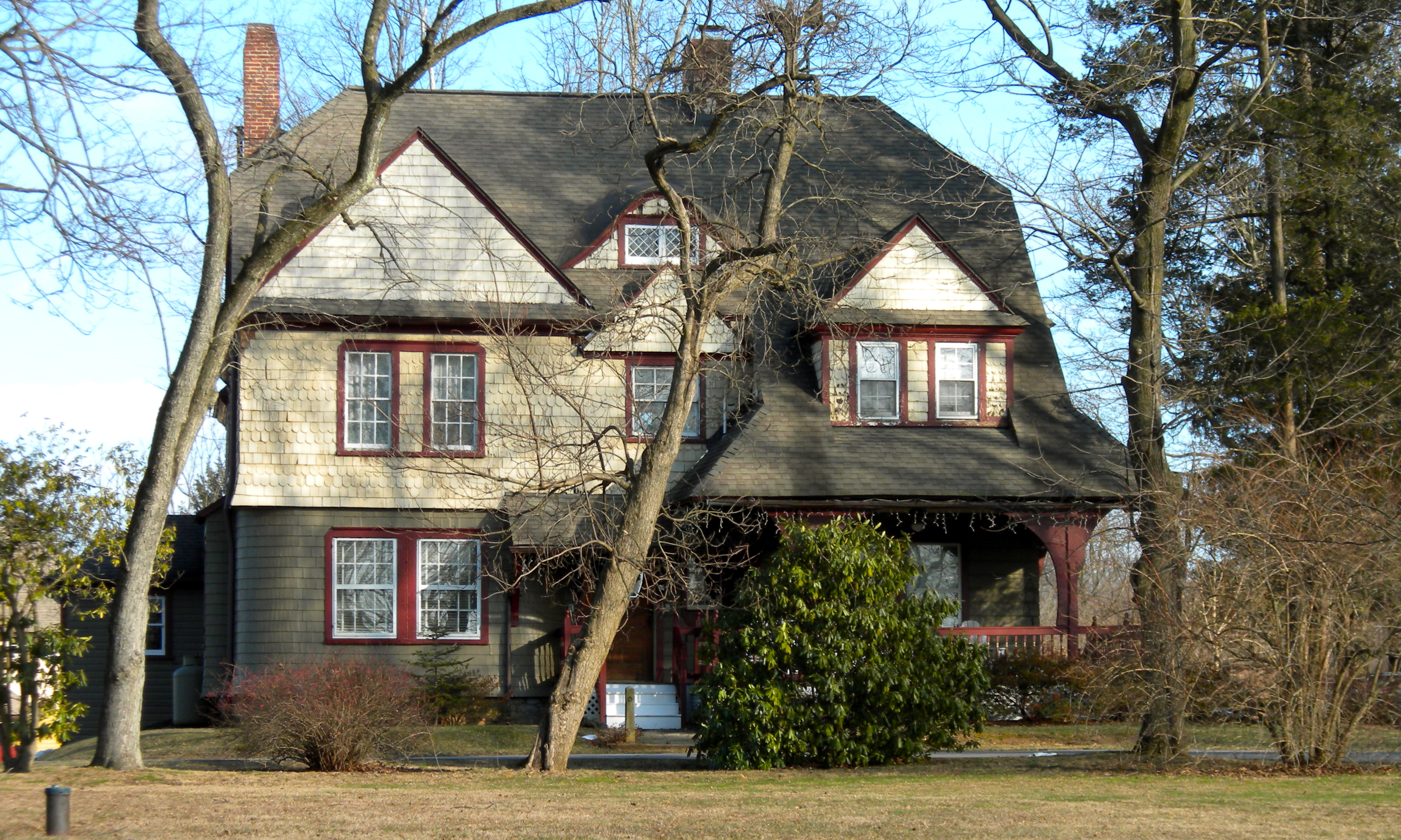
- Kinbawn, January 2010

- Location within Pennsylvania Location within the United States
- Location: 405 Highland Ave., West Whiteland Township, Pennsylvania
- Coordinates: 40°0′11″N 75°39′9″W
- Area: 4.8 acres (1.9 ha)
- Built: 1888
- Architect: Culver & Rogers
- Architectural style: Queen Anne, Shingle Style
- MPS: West Whiteland Township MRA
- NRHP reference No.: 84003280
- Added to NRHP: September 6, 1984

Kinbawn is an historic home that is located in West Whiteland Township, Chester County, Pennsylvania, United States.

It was listed on the National Register of Historic Places in 1984.

== History and architectural features ==
The house was built in 1888 as part of a development known as Bradford Hills. It is a 2 1/2-story, frame dwelling that sits on a stone foundation. Designed in the Queen Anne/Shingle Style, it has a steeply pitched, hipped roof and eyebrow windows. Also located on the property is a contributing stable.
