= West Chester Boarding School for Boys =

- U.S. National Register of Historic Places
- U.S. Historic district
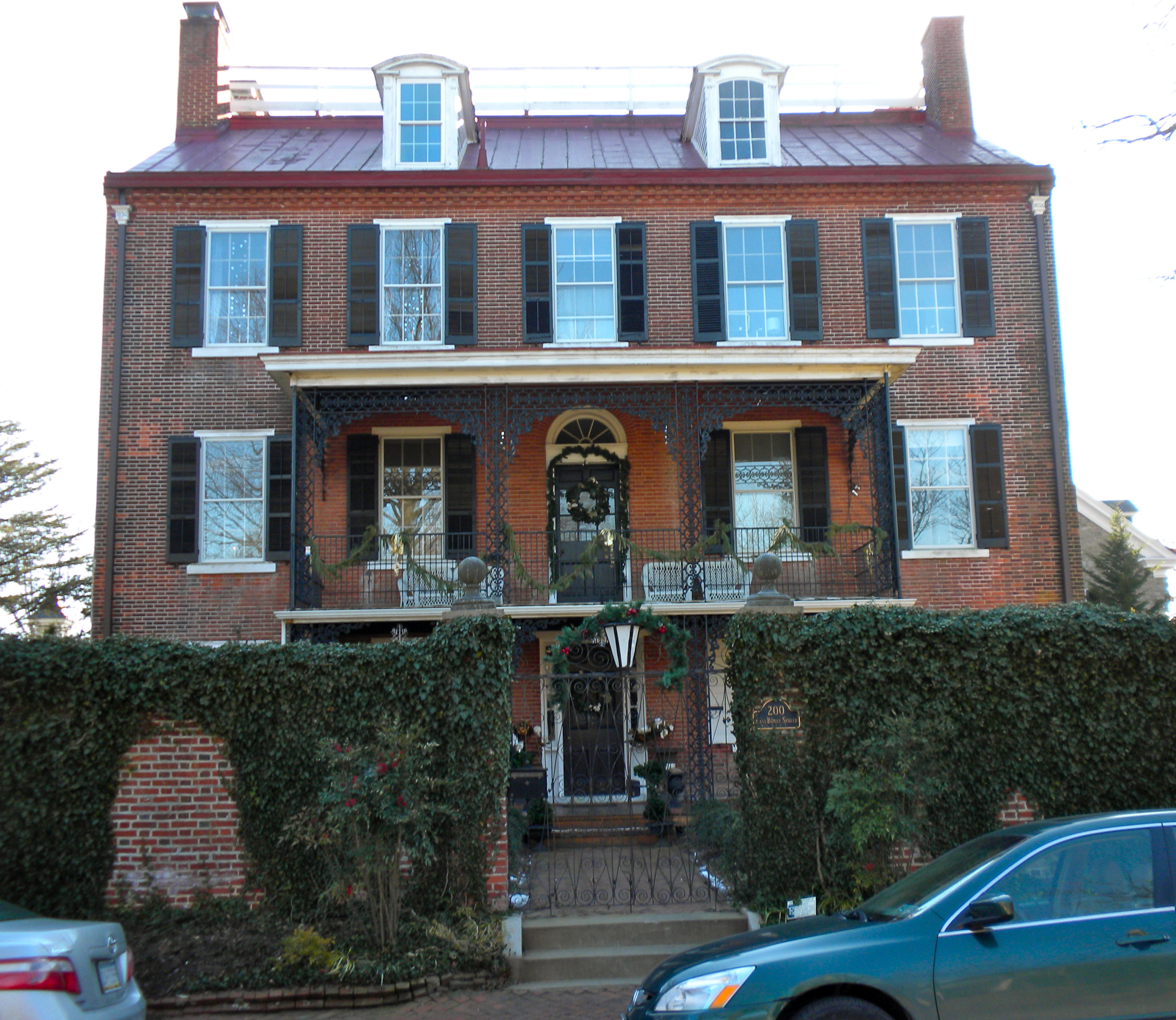
- West Chester Boarding School, January 2010

- Location within Pennsylvania Location within the United States
- Location: 200 E. Biddle St., West Chester, Pennsylvania
- Coordinates: 39°57′53″N 75°36′18″W
- Area: 0.4 acres (0.16 ha)
- Built: 1836
- Built by: Sharpless, Nathan
- Architectural style: Federal
- NRHP reference No.: 89002257
- Added to NRHP: January 4, 1990

The West Chester Boarding School for Boys, also known as Square House, is an historic boarding school and national historic district located in West Chester, Chester County, Pennsylvania, United States.

The building was listed on the National Register of Historic Places in 1990.

== History and architectural features ==
Built in 1836 as a private academy, this historic school is a three-story, five-bay by four-bay, brick building that was designed in the Federal style. It measures forty feet by forty-nine feet and has a low-pitched, gable roof with widow's walk. The front facade has a two-story portico that was added during the mid-nineteenth century. The school closed in 1862, after which the building was used as a private residence.
