= Sharples Homestead =

Historic house in Pennsylvania, United States

- U.S. National Register of Historic Places
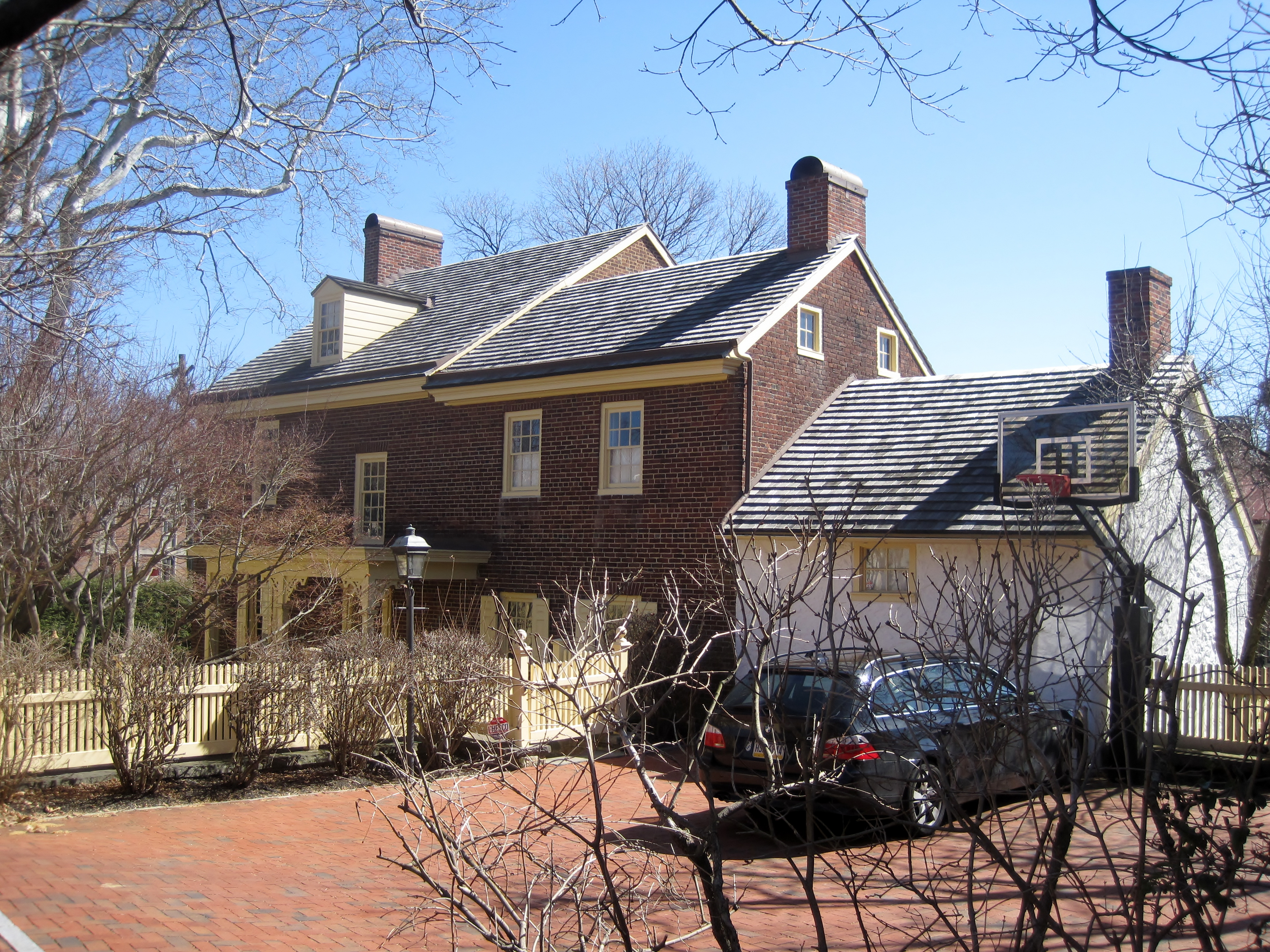
- Sharples Homestead, March 2013

- Location within Pennsylvania Location within the United States
- Location: 22 Dean St., West Chester, Pennsylvania
- Coordinates: 39.956096°N 75.601823°W
- Area: 1 acre (0.40 ha)
- Built: c. 1799-1805, 1884
- Built by: Sharples, William
- Architectural style: Federal
- NRHP reference No.: 85002412
- Added to NRHP: September 19, 1985

The Sharples Homestead is an historic home that is located in West Chester, Chester County, Pennsylvania, United States.

It was listed on the National Register of Historic Places in 1985.

== History and architectural features ==
Built between 1799 and 1805, this historic structure is a 2 1/2-story, three-bay, brick dwelling that was designed in the Federal style. It has a two-story, two-bay wing with a 1 1/2-story, stone kitchen addition. A one-story kitchen addition was added to the front of the wing in 1884.

Also located on the property is a contributing, two-story carriage house that was built circa 1888. This property was continuously occupied by the Sharples family from its construction until 1985.
