= Riter Boyer House =

Historic house in Pennsylvania, United States

- U.S. National Register of Historic Places
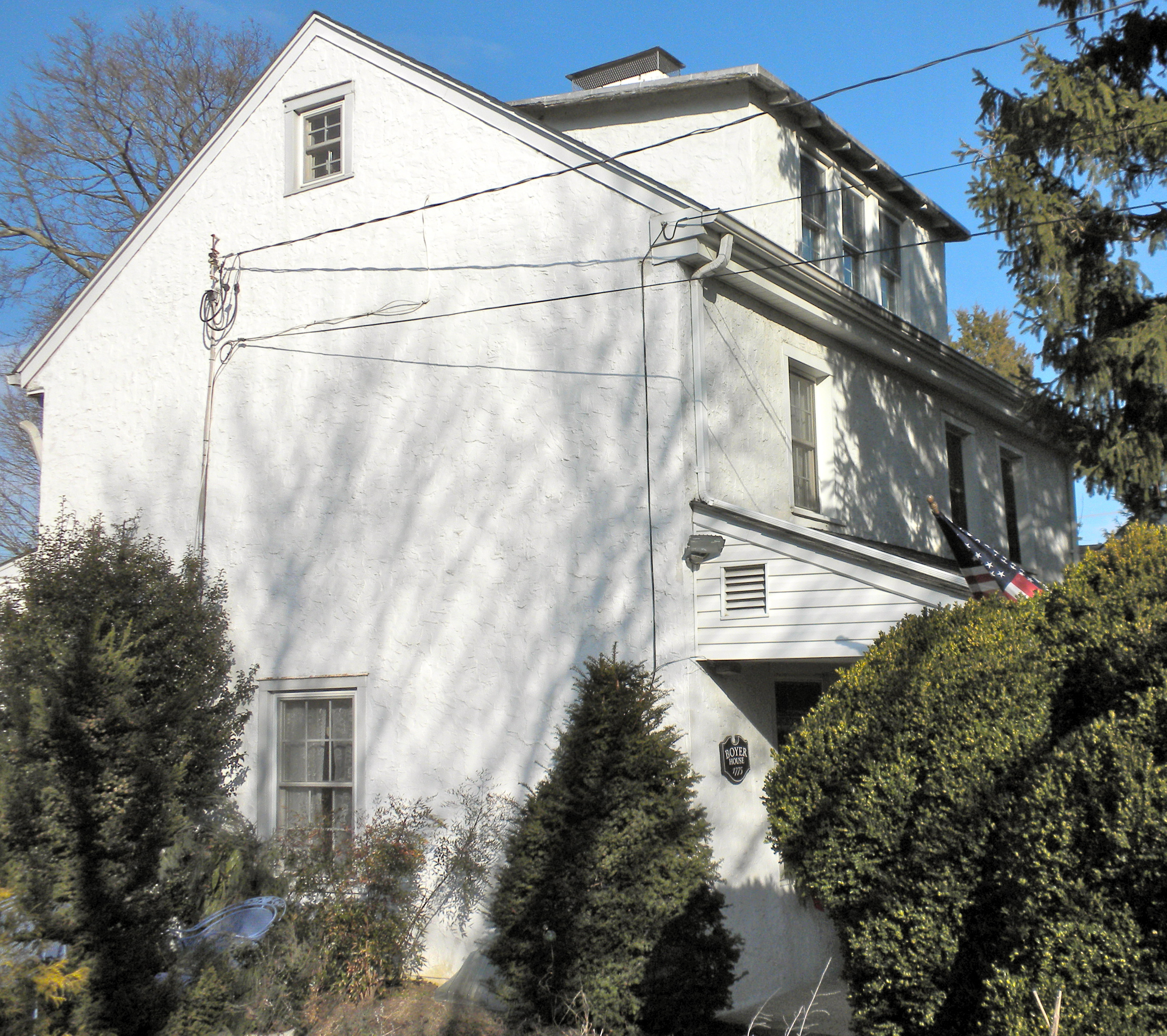
- Riter Boyer House, January 2010

- Location within Pennsylvania Location within the United States
- Location: 350 W. Boot Rd., West Whiteland Township, Pennsylvania
- Coordinates: 40°0′21″N 75°37′48″W
- Area: 0.8 acres (0.32 ha)
- Built: c. 1800, c. 1850
- MPS: West Whiteland Township MRA
- NRHP reference No.: 83004207
- Added to NRHP: November 10, 1983

Riter Boyer House is a historic home located in West Whiteland Township, Chester County, Pennsylvania. The house was built in three sections, with the oldest sections dated to about 1800. The oldest part is a 2 1/2-story, three-bay pointed-stone structure with a rear stuccoed-stone kitchen wing. A major stuccoed-stone four-bay wing was added about 1850.

It was listed on the National Register of Historic Places in 1983.
