= Joseph Rothrock House =

Historic house in Pennsylvania, United States

- U.S. National Register of Historic Places
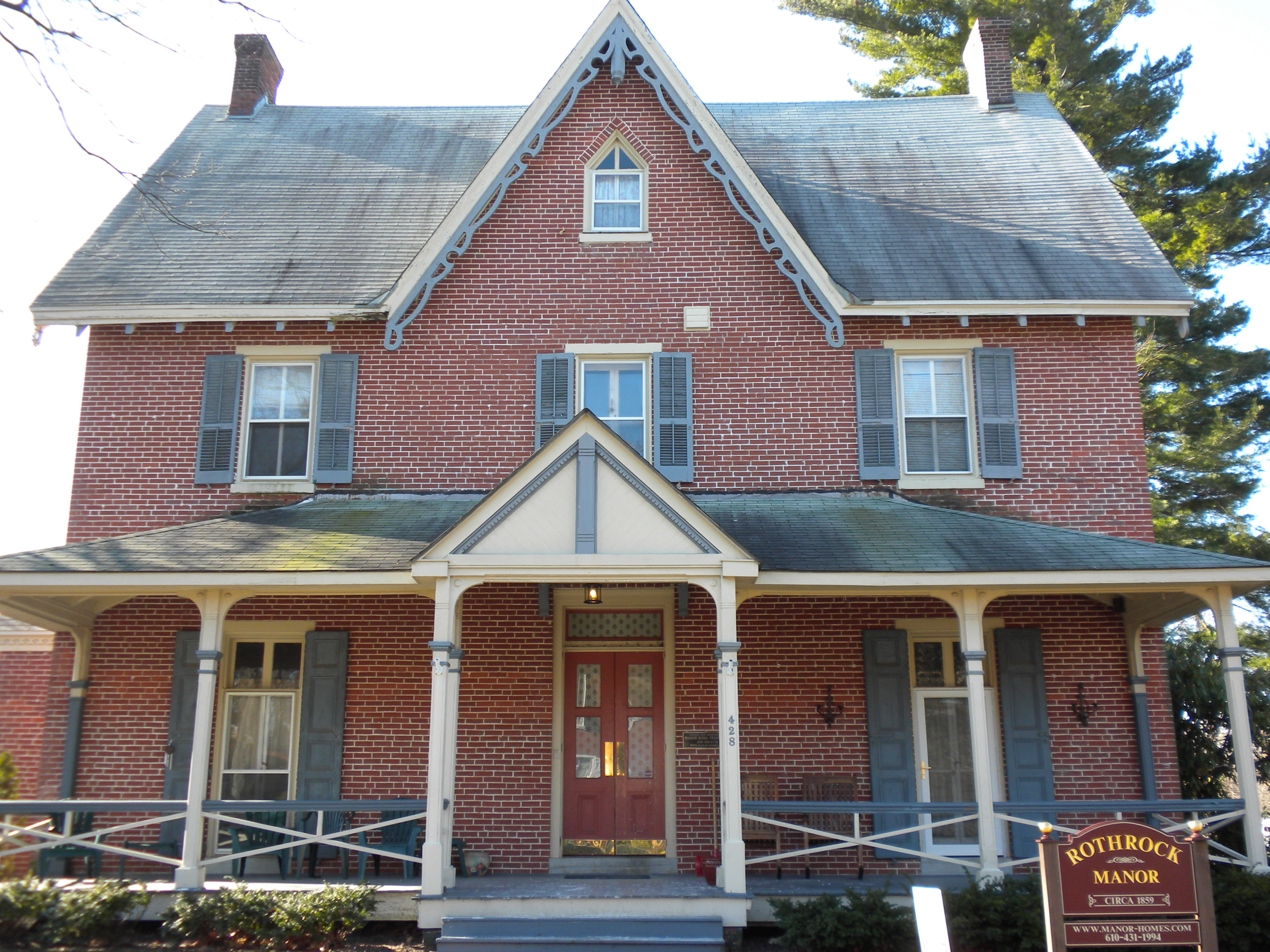
- Joseph Rothrock House, January 2010

- Location within Pennsylvania Location within the United States
- Location: 428 North Church Street, West Chester, Pennsylvania
- Coordinates: 39°57′49″N 75°36′34″W
- Area: 0.5 acres (0.20 ha)
- Built: 1858-1859
- Architect: Sharp & Ingram
- Architectural style: Gothic Revival
- NRHP reference No.: 84003211
- Added to NRHP: September 6, 1984

Joseph Rothrock House is a historic home located in West Chester, Chester County, Pennsylvania. It was built in 1858–59, and consists of a 2 1/2-story, three-bay main section with a 2 1/2-story gabled ell in the Gothic style. Later additions have been made to the ell. It is constructed of brick and features a full-width front verandah.

It was listed on the National Register of Historic Places in 1984.
