= Fox Chase Inn =

- U.S. National Register of Historic Places
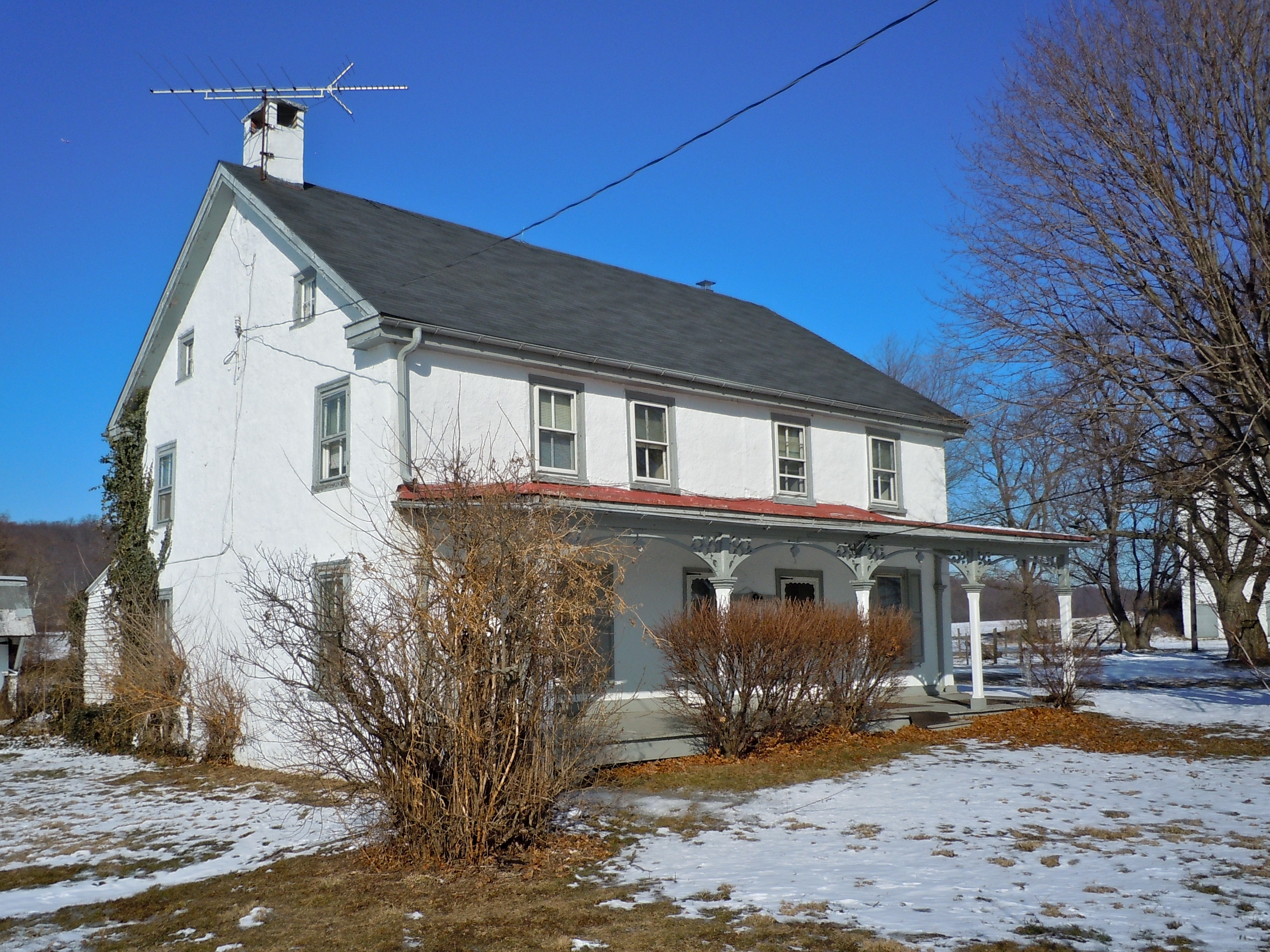
- Fox Chase Inn, January 2011

- Location within Pennsylvania Location within the United States
- Location: 613 Swedesford Rd., West Whiteland Township, Pennsylvania
- Coordinates: 40°2′18″N 75°36′53″W
- Area: 4.3 acres (1.7 ha)
- Built: 1700
- Architectural style: Georgian, Penn Plan-Double door
- MPS: West Whiteland Township MRA
- NRHP reference No.: 84003253
- Added to NRHP: September 6, 1984

Fox Chase Inn is a historic inn and tavern located in West Whiteland Township, Chester County, Pennsylvania. The original section was built about 1765, and is a two-story, two-bay, rectangular stone structure in the "Penn Plan." It was later expanded to a two-story, four-bay, double entrance Georgian style building. It has a full-width front porch. The building housed an inn and tavern until 1800.

The original tavern here was known as “Joseph Hawley’s House”, or "Hawley House" and Joseph Hawley received his license to operate the tavern in 1725. In 1741, when a man named Francis Elliot wanted to receive a tavern license to operate what would later become the Square Tavern, his application was denied because the Square Tavern would be only 2 miles away from Joseph Hawley's tavern. Joseph Hawley's tavern would later be known as Fox Chase Inn, though the original 1725 structure has been lost. The tavern began to be known as the "Sign Of The Fox Chase" by 1771. The second version of the inn, now the original Fox Chase Inn's structure, was built around 1765.

It was also known as the "Eagle and Compass", sometimes just called "Compass", between 1795 and 1832. After that, it became known as the "Old Fox Chase" once more, until eventually becoming known as the Fox Chase Inn today.

It was listed on the National Register of Historic Places in 1984.
