= Lochiel Farm =

Historic house in Pennsylvania, United States

- U.S. National Register of Historic Places
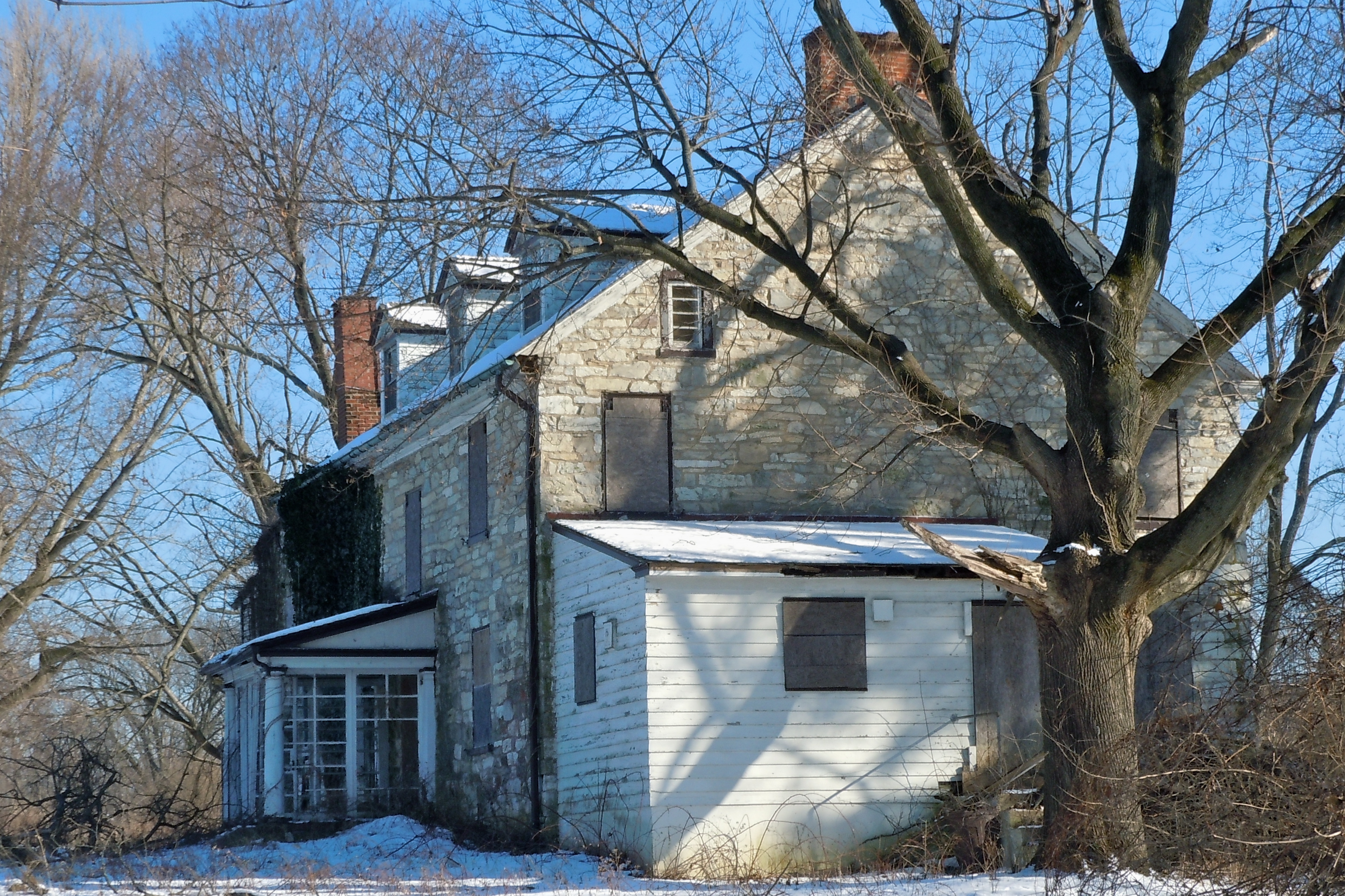
- Lochiel Farm, January 2011

- Location within Pennsylvania Location within the United States
- Location: 111A N. Ship Rd., West Whiteland Township, Pennsylvania
- Coordinates: 40°1′55″N 75°36′31″W
- Area: 1.4 acres (0.57 ha)
- Built: c. 1800
- Architectural style: Georgian, Federal
- MPS: West Whiteland Township MRA
- NRHP reference No.: 84003289
- Added to NRHP: September 6, 1984

Lochiel Farm is a historic home located in West Whiteland Township, Chester County, Pennsylvania. The house was built about 1800. It consists of a large, two-story, double pile stone central section with two flanking wings in the Georgian / Federal style.

It was listed on the National Register of Historic Places in 1984.

The manor home and adjacent carriage house were renovated in 2020 and sold in 2021. They were incorporated into a new subdivision called Lochiel Farm.
