= Grove Historic District =

Historic district in Pennsylvania, United States

- U.S. National Register of Historic Places
- U.S. Historic district
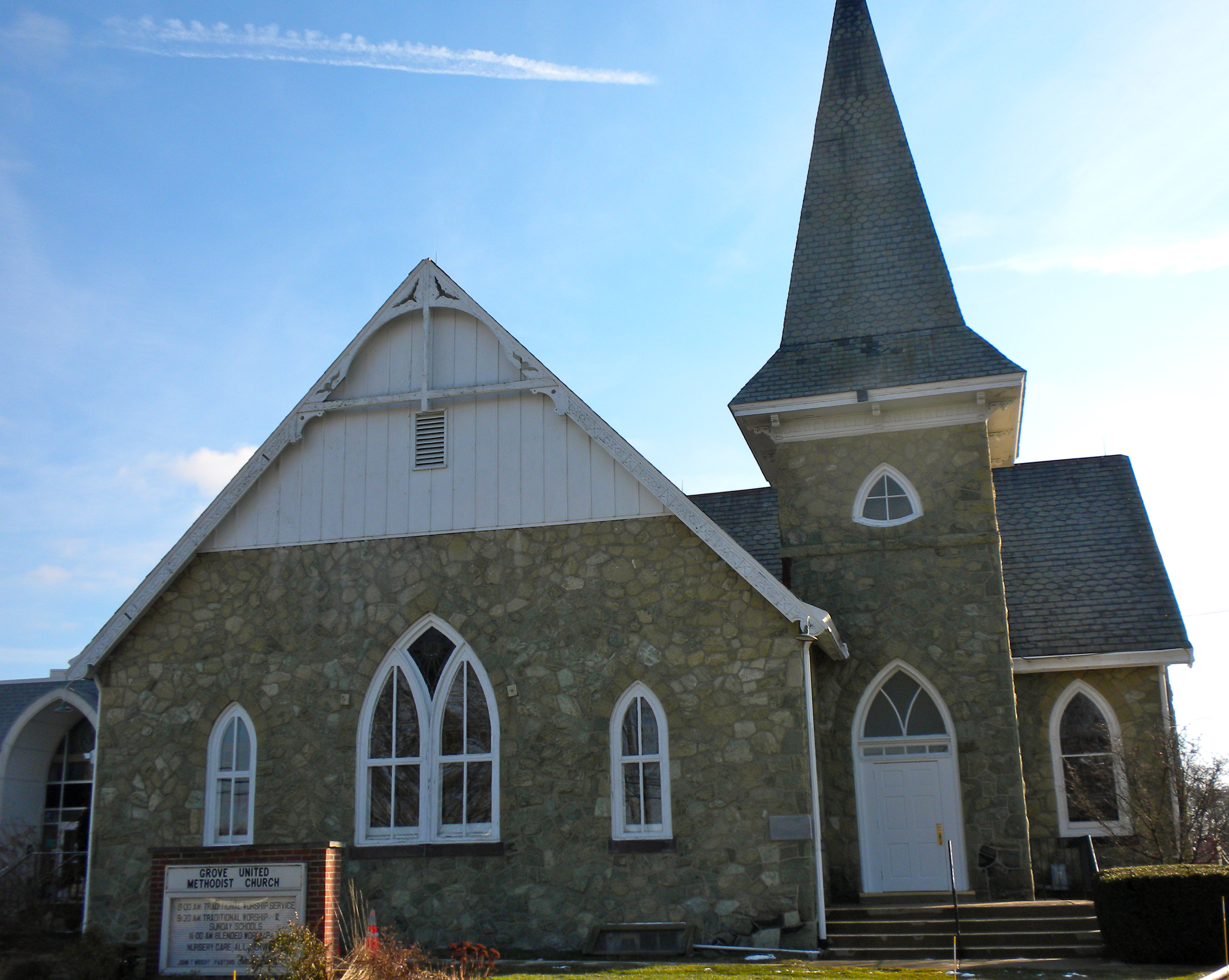
- Grove Methodist Church, Grove Historic District, January 2010

- Location within Pennsylvania Location within the United States
- Location: South Whitford Road near Downingtown, West Whiteland Township, Pennsylvania
- Coordinates: 40°00′16″N 75°38′03″W
- Area: 19 acres (7.7 ha)
- MPS: West Whiteland Township MRA
- NRHP reference No.: 84003264
- Added to NRHP: August 2, 1984

The Grove Historic District is a national historic district which is located in West Whiteland Township, Chester County, Pennsylvania.

It was listed on the National Register of Historic Places in 1984.

== History and architectural features ==
This historic district encompasses ten contributing buildings and one contributing site that are located in the crossroads village of Grove, Pennsylvania.

Notable buildings include the Grove Methodist Church, which was erected in 1888, the former one-room schoolhouse, which was built in 1870, the Grove Tavern, the Grove Church, and an old store. The contributing site is the cemetery adjacent to the Grove Methodist Church.
