= Woodland station (Pennsylvania) =

- Woodland Station
- U.S. National Register of Historic Places
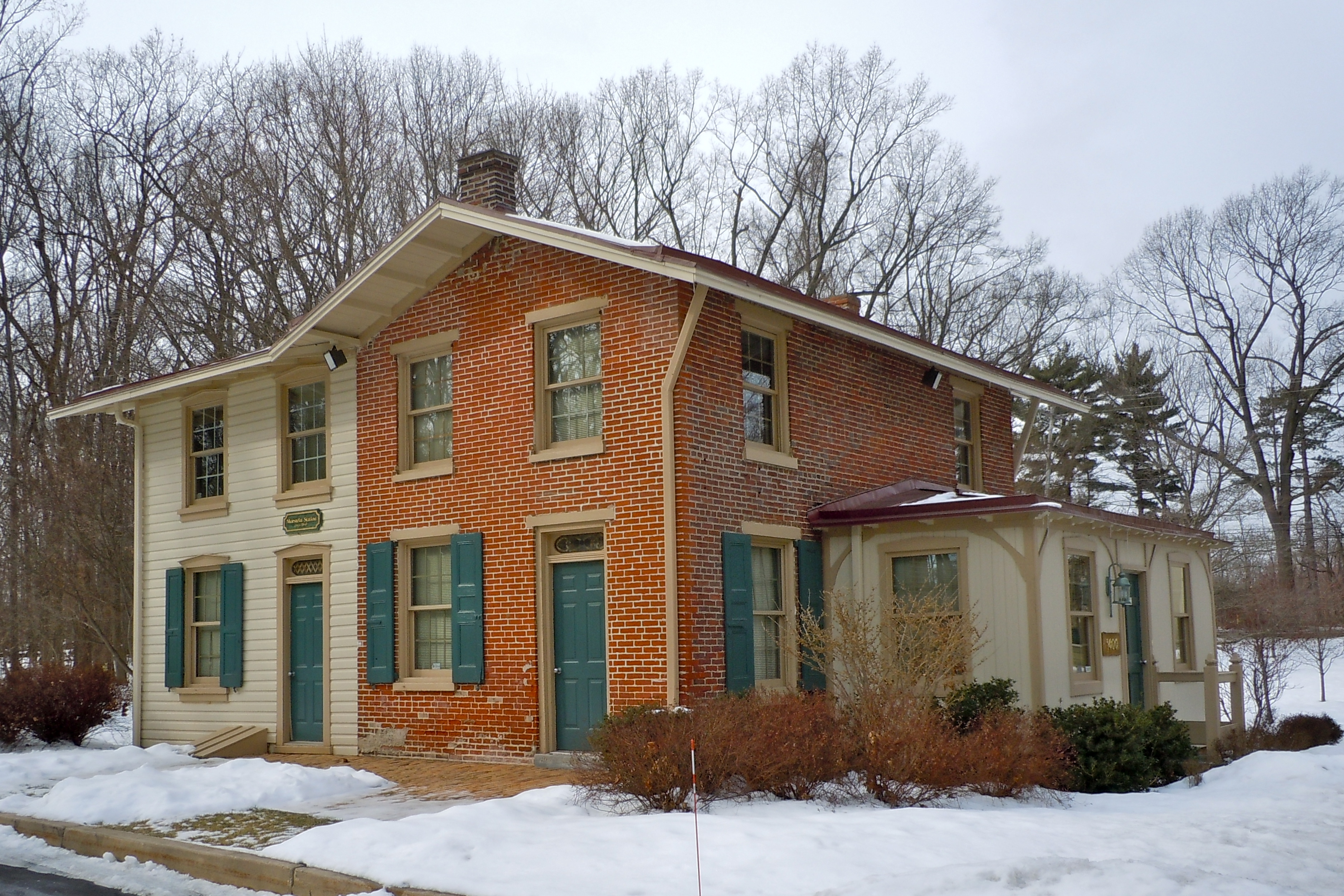
- Woodland Station, January 2011

- Location within Pennsylvania Location within the United States
- Location: 408 King Road, West Whiteland Township, Pennsylvania
- Coordinates: 40°1′13″N 75°34′55″W
- Area: 9.1 acres (3.7 ha)
- MPS: West Whiteland Township MRA
- NRHP reference No.: 84003326
- Added to NRHP: September 6, 1984

Woodland station, also known as Zermatt station and Morstein station, is an historic railway station in West Whiteland Township, Chester County, Pennsylvania, United States.

== History and architectural features ==
This station started out as a two-story brick building that was erected by the West Chester Railroad during the 1870s. It was enlarged in 1889 with a two-story, frame addition with vertical novelty siding. It is now part of a corporate campus.

It was listed on the National Register of Historic Places in 1984.
