= Jacob Zook House =

Historic house in Pennsylvania, United States

- U.S. National Register of Historic Places
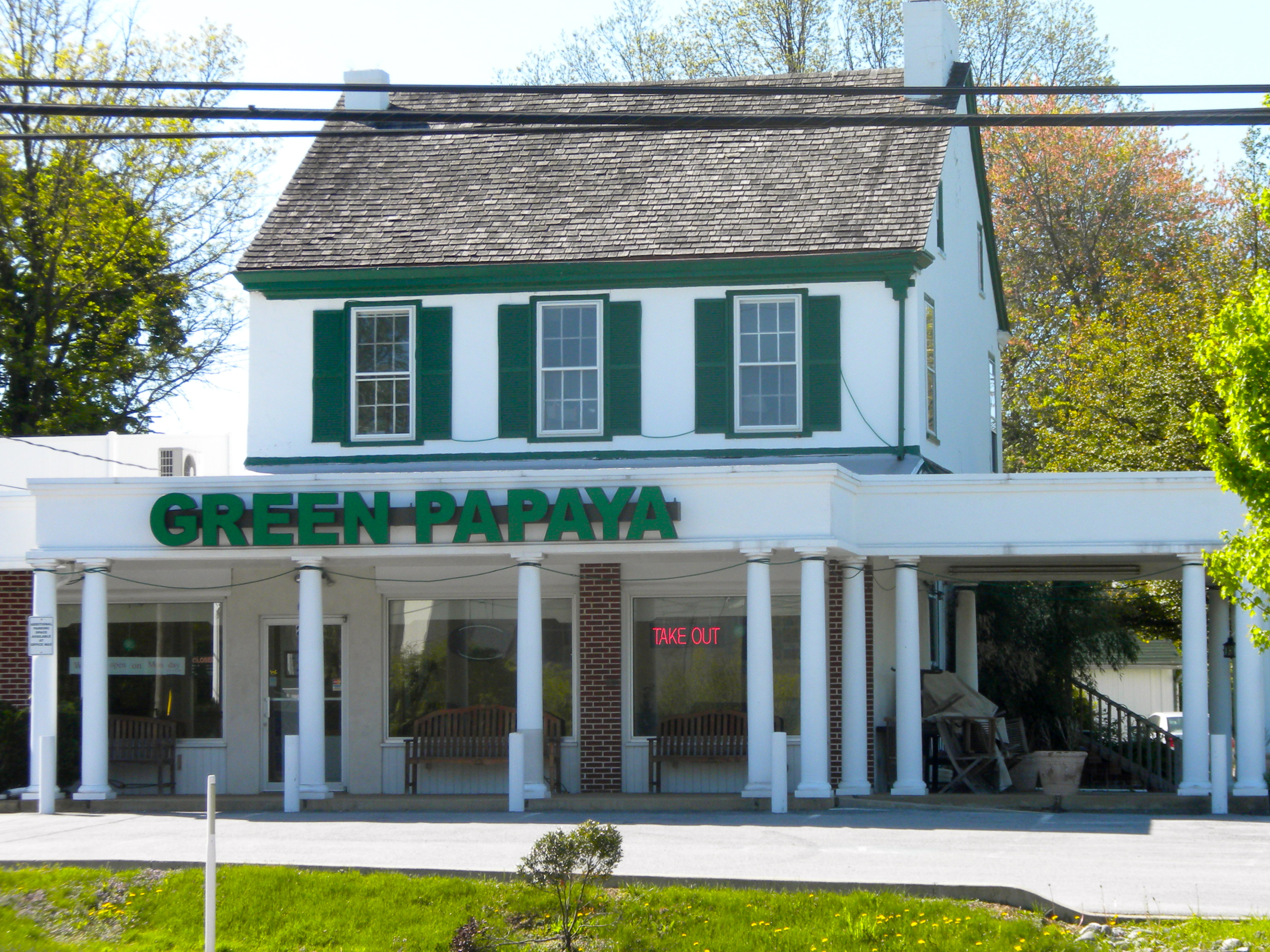
- Jacob Zook House, April 2010

- Location within Pennsylvania Location within the United States
- Location: 290 E. Lincoln Hwy., West Whiteland Township, West Whiteland Township, Pennsylvania
- Coordinates: 40°1′44″N 75°37′27″W
- Area: 1.4 acres (0.57 ha)
- Built: 1820, 1850
- Architectural style: Federal
- NRHP reference No.: 95000127
- Added to NRHP: February 24, 1995

The Jacob Zook House, also known as the Rodney House and Store, is an historic home on the East Lincoln Highway in Exton, West Whiteland Township, Chester County, Pennsylvania, United States.

It was listed on the National Register of Historic Places in 1995.

== History and architectural features ==
This historic structure is a 2 1/2-story, T-shaped, stone dwelling. The house was built circa 1820, and was designed in the Federal style. It has a "T" kitchen wing that was added in 1850. It has a one-storey, projecting storefront that replaces the original porch.

In 2010, it housed the "Green Papaya" fast food restaurant; however, from 2013, it housed the "Biryani King" Indian restaurant.
