= List of Pennsylvania state historical markers in Chester County =

Location of Chester County in Pennsylvania

This is a list of the Pennsylvania state historical markers in Chester County.

This is intended to be a complete list of the official state historical markers placed in Chester County, Pennsylvania, by the Pennsylvania Historical and Museum Commission (PHMC). The locations of the historical markers, as well as the latitude and longitude coordinates as provided by the PHMC's database, are provided below when available. There are 78 historical markers located in Chester County.

== Historical markers ==
Marker title	Image	Date dedicated	Location	Marker type	Topics
American Light Infantry (The)		September 11, 1915	US 1 (N side), 1 mile W of Chadds Ford; Coordinates not available	Plaque	American Revolution, Military
Ann Preston, M.D. (1813–1872)		March 22, 2008	225 State Rd., West Grove; 39.8204°N 75.8127°W	Roadside	African American, Medicine & Science, Religion, Underground Railroad, Women
Baptist Church in the Great Valley		April 21, 1951	N Valley Forge Rd., just S of Old Forge Crossing, Tredyffrin Twp., Tredyffrin Township; 40.0657909°N 75.4328880°W	Roadside	Religion
Battle of Brandywine		March 18, 1952	Pa. 842 at intersection SR 3061 SW of West Chester	Roadside	American Revolution, Military
Battle of Brandywine		March 18, 1952	U.S. 1, 1 mile E of Kennett Square; 39.8582°N 75.68982°W	Roadside	American Revolution, George Washington, Military
Battle of Brandywine		March 18, 1952	U.S. 1, 1 mile E of Kennett Square	Roadside	American Revolution, George Washington, Military
Battle of Brandywine		March 18, 1952	Pa. 926 at intersection SR 1001 (Birmingham Rd.) W of Darlington Corners, West Chester	Roadside	American Revolution, Military
Battle of the Clouds		September 13, 2014	606 Swedesford Rd., Frazer; 40.04216°N 75.57756°W	Roadside	American Revolution, Military
Bayard Rustin		February 16, 1995	At the school, Lincoln & Montgomery Aves., West Chester	City	African American, Civil Rights, Education
Berwyn School Fight		November 21, 2020	At Mt. Zion AME Church, 380 N Fairfield Rd., Devon; 40.05643°N 75.43434°W	Roadside	African American, Education, Government & Politics 20th Century, Religion
Birmingham Friends Meeting House		September 1915	Wall of Meetinghouse, SR 2001 (Birmingham Rd.), .5 mile SE of PA 926, West Chester; 39.9057°N 75.59425°W	Plaque	American Revolution, Buildings & Architecture, Military, Religion, Science & Medicine
Brandywine Mansion		July 25, 1985	102 S. 1st Ave., Coatesville; 39.98052°N 75.82168°W	Roadside	Buildings, Business & Industry, Iron, Mansions & Manors
The British Attack - PLAQUE		September 1915	PA 926 at intersection SR 2001 (Birmingham Rd.), West Chester; 39.91029°N 75.59811°W	Plaque	American Revolution, Military
Camp Elder Civil War Paroled P.O.W. Camp		September 7, 2013	Oakbourne Rd. & Trellis Ln., Westtown Twp. in Westtown Township; 39.94231°N 75.57165°W	Roadside	Civil War, Military
Chester County		October 26, 1982	County Courthouse, N. High St., West Chester; 39.95997°N 75.60482°W	City	American Revolution, Early Settlement, Government & Politics, Government & Politics 17th Century, Military, William Penn
Chester Springs		May 13, 1948	Pa. 113 at Chester Springs; 40.0953°N 75.61762°W	Roadside	American Revolution, George Washington, Medicine & Science, Military, Sports
Dilworthtown - PLAQUE		September 1915	SR 2001 (Birmingham Rd.) & Old Wilmington Pike, Dilworthtown; 39.8996°N 75.5671°W	Plaque	American Revolution, Military
Dr. Charlotte Moore Sitterly (1898–1990)		September 24, 2005	640 Buck Run Rd., East Fallowfield Township; 39.94538°N 75.84061°W	Roadside	Medicine & Science, Religion, Women
Devon Horse Show		October 27, 2015	105 E Lancaster Ave., Devon; 40.04745°N 75.41964°W	Roadside	Sports & Recreation
Duffy's Cut Mass Grave		June 18, 2004	King Rd. at Sugartown Rd., Malvern; 40.0335°N 75.5296°W	Roadside	Business & Industry, Ethnic & Immigration, Labor, Medicine & Science, Railroads
Eusebius Barnard (1802–1865)		April 30, 2011	715 S Wawaset Rd., Pocopson Twp., Pocopson Township; 39.9019°N 75.6605°W	Roadside	African American, Religion, Underground Railroad, Women
Evan Pugh, Ph.D.		September 26, 1964	Jordan Bank Elem. School, S. Fifth and Hodgson streets, Oxford; 39.781315°N 75.974408°W	City	Agriculture, Education, Environment, Professions & Vocations, Science & Medicine
Frederick Douglass		February 1, 2006	West Chester Univ. campus, between Library and Main Hall, facing High St. 39.95235°N 75.59732°W	Roadside	African American, Civil Rights, Education, Government & Politics 19th Century, Military, Publishing
G. Raymond Rettew		September 17, 2002	Walnut & Chestnut Streets, West Chester; 39.96182°N 75.60485°W	Roadside	Business & Industry, Medicine & Science, Military, Military Post-Civil War, Professions & Vocations
Gen. Anthony Wayne		April 13, 1949	U.S. 30 at junction Pa. 252 E of Paoli; 40.042°N 75.4767°W	Roadside	American Revolution, French & Indian War, Military, Native American
General Lafayette		June 9, 1951	NW corner, N. Church & W. Lafayette Sts., West Chester; 39.96523°N 75.61°W	City	American Revolution, Military
General Sir William Howe		August 19, 1947	U.S. 202, 2.9 miles NE of Paoli (Missing); Coordinates not available	Roadside	American Revolution, Military
George Alexander Spratt		October 16, 2021	800 Reeceville Rd., West Brandywine; 40.025935°N 75.798393°W	Roadside	Invention
Graceanna Lewis (1821–1912)		April 5, 2014	2123 Kimberton Rd., Phoenixville (E Pikeland Twp.); 40.13076°N 75.57421°W	Roadside	African American, Education, Religion, Science & Medicine, Women
Great Minquas Path		June 26, 1951	Business U.S. 322, 1 mile SE of West Chester; 39.9483°N 75.5938°W	Roadside	Native American, Paths & Trails, Transportation
Great Minquas Path		November 14, 1925	US 202 & 322, at Church Ave., 1/2 mile S of West Chester; 39.9483°N 75.5938°W	Plaque	Early Settlement, Ethnic & Immigration, Native American, Paths & Trails
Great Valley Mill		August 19, 1947	U.S. 202, 1.5 miles NE of Paoli (Missing); Coordinates not available	Roadside	Buildings, Business & Industry, Mills
Hannah Freeman		September 1925	PA 52 (E side), .2 mile N of junction US 1, Kennett Square; 39.8724°N 75.6687°W	Plaque	Government & Politics 18th Century, Native American, Religion, Women
Hopewell Historic District		November 10, 1996	Intersection of Hopewell & Lower Hopewell Roads, Lower Oxford & E. Nottingham Twps. 39.77955°N 76.01703°W	Roadside	Agriculture, Business & Industry, Education
Hopewell Village		August 5, 1948	Pa. 345 at Warwick, just N of junction Pa. 23; 40.16142°N 75.78995°W	Roadside	Business & Industry, Furnaces, Iron
Horace Pippin		June 9, 1979	327 Gay St., West Chester; 39.9583°N 75.61037°W	City	African American, Artists
Hosanna Meeting House		May 9, 1992	Old U.S. 1 (Baltimore Pike) N of Lincoln University campus, Lower Oxford Twp. 39.8115°N 75.9253°W	Roadside	African American, Houses & Homesteads, Religion, Underground Railroad
Humphry Marshall (1722–1801)		October 18, 2014	1407 W Strasburg Rd., West Chester; 39.95002°N 75.68072°W	Roadside	Agriculture, Environment, Professions & Vocations, Science & Medicine, Writers
Ida Ella Ruth Jones		October 23, 2004	Pa. 82 (Doe Run Rd.) at Rokeby Rd., East Fallowfield; 39.93978°N 75.83278°W	Roadside	African American, Artists, Women
Isaac & Dinah Mendenhall (1806-82 / 1807–89)		November 10, 2018	301 Kennett Pike (PA 52), at Hillendale Rd., Kennett Twp., Kennett Square; 39.85934°N 75.64543°W	Roadside	Abraham Lincoln, African American, Religion, Underground Railroad, Women
James Joseph "Jim" Croce (1943–1973)		April 9, 2022	Highspire and Creek Rds., Lyndell, in East Brandywine Township; 40.059845°N 75.745034°W	Roadside	Music & Theater
John Beale Bordley		February 25, 1953	SR 3062 (Strasburg Rd.) just off Pa. 162, 1.6 miles W of Marshalltown	Roadside	Agriculture, Environment, Invention, Professions & Vocations
John F. Fritz		August 16, 1954	Pa. 41, 2.8 miles SE of Cochranville (Missing); 39.87188°N 75.87703°W	Roadside	Business & Industry, Invention, Iron & Steel, Professions & Vocations
John G. Parke		July 22, 1968	Business US 30 at Veterans Hospital, near N Caln Rd., E of Coatesville; 39.98853°N 75.79345°W	Roadside	Civil War, Environment, Government & Politics, Military, Professions & Vocations
Joseph T. Rothrock		June 9, 1952	NW corner, N. Church St. & W. Lafayette St., West Chester; 39.9635°N 75.60922°W	City	Environment, Medicine & Science, Professions & Vocations
Lightfoot Mill (Mill at Anselma)		October 13, 2007	1730 Conestoga Rd. (W side of state hwy. 401), Chester Spgs. 40.08263°N 75.642647°W	Roadside	Business & Industry, Mills
Lincoln Biography		September 17, 1952	28 W. Market St., West Chester; 39.95928°N 75.60515°W	City	Abraham Lincoln, Government & Politics, Government & Politics 19th Century, Publishing
Lincoln University		January 25, 1967	SR 3026 (old U.S. 1), 2 miles NE of Oxford; 39.8106°N 75.9281°W	Roadside	African American, Education
Lynching of Zachariah Walker		December 9, 2006	Rt. 82 south, approx. 1/4 mile from Coatesville city limits	Roadside	African American, Civil Rights, Government & Politics 20th Century
Minguannan Indian Town - PLAQUE		October 1924	Intersection SR 3006 (Yeatman Station Rd.) & SR 3034 (London Tract Rd.), 1.5 miles NE of Strickersville; 39.74627°N 75.77517°W	Plaque	Cities & Towns, Early Settlement, Government & Politics 17th Century, Native American, William Penn
Okehocking Indian Town - PLAQUE		June 1924	PA 3 (West Chester Pike), .5 mile E of PA 926 & 4 miles W of Newtown Square; 39.96738°N 75.48132°W	Plaque	Cities & Towns, Early Settlement, Native American, William Penn
Osborne's Hill - PLAQUE		September 1915	Sr 2001 (Birmingham Rd.) at driveway to Osborne Hill, 1 mile S of Strodes Mill; 39.92272°N 75.60885°W	Plaque	American Revolution, Military
Parker Kidnapping & Rescue		September 17, 2011	At Fremont Cemetery & Union Methodist Church, 321 Fremont Rd., West Nottingham Township; 39.74127°N 76.06548°W	Roadside	African American, Government & Politics 19th Century, Women
Pennhurst State School & Hospital		April 10, 2010	Schuylkill Rd. (PA 174) near Bridge St., Spring City	Roadside	Civil Rights, Education, Government & Politics 20th Century
Pennsylvania		December 12, 1948	U.S. 1, approx. .6 miles from state line	Roadside	Government & Politics, Government & Politics 17th Century, William Penn
Pennsylvania		December 12, 1948	Pa. 41, approx. .7 miles from state line	Roadside	Government & Politics, Government & Politics 17th Century, William Penn
Peter Bezellon		October 14, 1954	SR 3064 (West Chester Rd.) at Oak St., S end Coatesville; 39.98185°N 75.8048°W	City	Early Settlement, Native American, Professions & Vocations
Philadelphia & Lancaster Turnpike		November 20, 1999	E Lincoln Hwy. (Bus. Rt. 30), near Veterans Dr., Caln Twp., just E of Coatesville; 39.98848°N 75.79208°W	Roadside	Government & Politics, Roads, Transportation
Phoenix Iron Company		October 29, 2005	Main St., Phoenixville, near municipal parking lot and P.I.C. site	City	Business & Industry, Civil War, Iron, Military
Queonemysing Indian Town (PLAQUE)		October 4, 1924	PA 100, ~.1 mile N of state line, and at Delaware County line (MISSING)	Plaque	Cities & Towns, Early Settlement, Native American, William Penn
Samuel Barber		March 9, 1996	107 S. Church St., West Chester; 39.57833°N 75.6045°W	City	Music & Theater
Reading Furnace Historic District		May 12, 1948	Pa. 23 between Warwick & Knauertown	Roadside	Business & Industry, Furnaces, Iron
Sconnelltown - PLAQUE		September 1, 1915	Near junction SR 3061 & 2001, just off PA 842 SW of West Chester; 39.93555°N 75.62505°W	Plaque	American Revolution, Military
Springton Manor Farm		October 5, 1984	SR 4023 (Springton Rd.) & Highspire Rd., 1 mile N of U.S. 322, Wallace Twp.	Roadside	Government & Politics, Government & Politics 18th Century, Mansions & Manors, William Penn
Star of the West, Tent No. Six		May 15, 1995	113 S Adams St., West Chester; 39.96137°N 75.59757°W	City	African American, Women
Steyning Manor - PLAQUE		October 1, 1926	SR 3048 (old US 1) southbound, .5 mile W of Kennett Square; 39.84464°N 75.7271°W	Plaque	Government & Politics, Mansions & Manors, Native American, William Penn
Sunset Park		August 12, 2018	S Jennersville Rd. (PA 796) at Waltman Ln., West Grove; 39.8216°N 75.87124°W	Roadside	Music & Theater, Performers
Thomas B. Read		May 12, 1948	US 322 at Corner Ketch Lyndell Rd.(SR 4037), NW of Downingtown	Roadside	Artists, Writers
Thomas McKean		October 26, 1974	Pa. 896 NW of Pa. 841, Franklin	Roadside	Government & Politics, Government & Politics 18th Century, Governors
Trimble's Ford - PLAQUE		September 1, 1915	SR 3023 (Camp Linden Rd.), .2 mile E of SR 3058, Marshallton; 39.9341°N 75.68042°W	Plaque	American Revolution, Military
Village of Valley Forge		September 17, 1960	Valley Forge Rd. (PA 23) near Owen Dr., at E end of village and Montgomery Co. line	Roadside	Early Settlement, George Washington, Government & Politics, Government & Politics 18th Century, Iron
Village of Valley Forge		September 17, 1960	Valley Forge Rd. (PA 23) near Valley Park Rd., W end of village 40.10125°N 75.47447°W	Roadside	American Revolution, Business & Industry, Cities & Towns, George Washington, Iron, Military
Valley Forge General Hospital		October 27, 2012	near 1401 Charlestown Rd., Phoenixville in Schuylkill Township; 40.11742°N 75.54403°W	Roadside	Military, Military Post-Civil War, Science & Medicine
Warwick Furnace		May 12, 1948	Pa. 23 between Warwick & Knauertown	Roadside	Business & Industry, Furnaces, Iron
Wharton Esherick (1887–1970)		September 9, 2018	Horseshoe Trial & Country Club Rd., Phoenixville in Tredyffrin Township; 40.08374°N 75.4952°W	Roadside	Artists, Professions & Vocations
Whittier C. Atkinson		April 14, 2007	824 E Chestnut St., Coatesville	City	African American, Medicine & Science
William Darlington		April 11, 1952	13 N. High St. between Market & Gay Sts., West Chester; 39.96013°N 75.60477°W	City	Environment, Government & Politics 19th Century, Medicine & Science, Professions & Vocations
Woman's Rights Convention of 1852		October 13, 2003	225 N. High St., West Chester; 39.96203°N 75.6066°W	City	Civil Rights, Education, Professions & Vocations, Women

== See also ==
- List of Pennsylvania state historical markers
- List of Pennsylvania state historical markers in the Borough of West Chester
- National Register of Historic Places listings in Chester County, Pennsylvania
