= Elijah F. Pennypacker =

American politician and abolitionist (1804–1888)

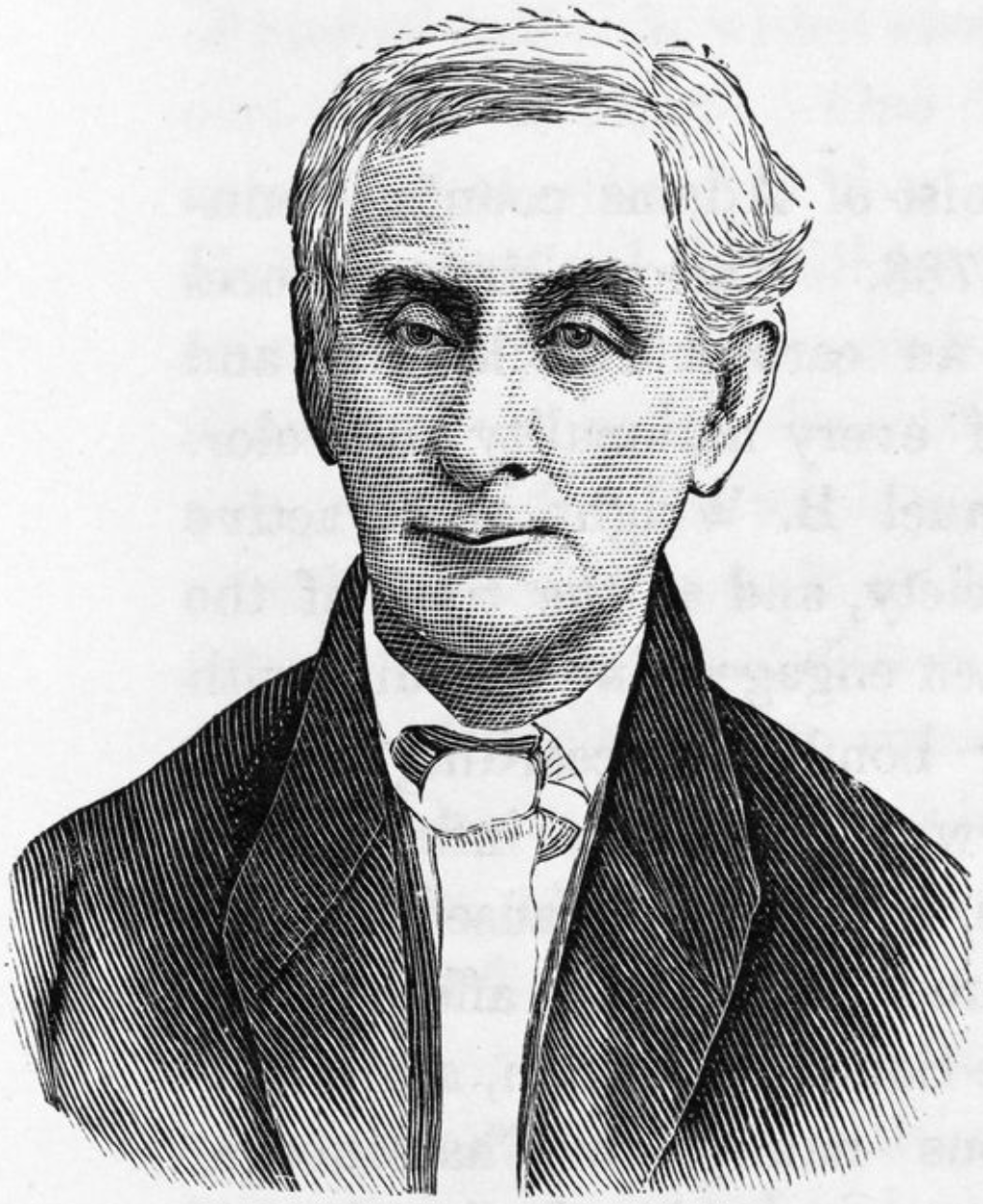
- Sketch of Pennypacker in 1872

Member of the Pennsylvania House of Representatives from the Chester County district
- In office 1835–1836 Serving with Charles Brooke, John Hutchinson, John Parker
- Preceded by: Oliver Alison, Samuel McCleane, Wilmer Worthington, Thomas I. ?
- Succeeded by: John Parker, Abraham R. McIlvaine, Maurice Richardson, Isaac Downing
- In office 1832–1833 Serving with Thomas Ashbridge, Arthur Andrews, Benjamin Griffith
- Preceded by: Thomas Ashbridge, Matthias Pennypacker, Arthur Andrews, Benjamin Griffith
- Succeeded by: Oliver Alison, Samuel McCleane, Wilmer Worthington, Thomas I. ?

Personal details
- Born: Elijah Funk Pennypacker; November 20, 1804 Schuylkill Township, Chester County, Pennsylvania, U.S.
- Died: January 4, 1888 (aged 83) Chester County, Pennsylvania, U.S.
- Resting place: Schuylkill Friends Meeting Cemetery
- Spouses: Sarah W. Coates (m. 1831; died 1841) Hannah Adamson (m. 1843)
- Children: 9
- Occupation: Politician
- Known for: Station master of the Underground Railroad

Elijah Funk Pennypacker (November 20, 1804 – January 4, 1888) was a politician, abolitionist and station master in the Underground Railroad in the United States, in the years leading up to the American Civil War. He operated in Chester County, Pennsylvania. Pennypacker's home, White Horse Farm, was a safe house during the time that he participated in the Underground Railroad. As a station master in the Underground Railroad, Pennypacker reportedly aided hundreds of fugitive slaves in their escape to freedom, without any having been apprehended by authorities or by bounty hunters. He also served as a member of the Pennsylvania House of Representatives, representing Chester County from 1832 to 1833 and from 1835 to 1836.

== Early life ==
Elijah Funk Pennypacker was born on November 20, 1804, in Schuylkill Township, Chester County, Pennsylvania, to Elizabeth (née Funk) and Joseph Pennypacker. He was educated at John Gummere's Boarding School in Burlington, New Jersey. He taught at a private school in Philadelphia and then moved back home. He worked as a teacher and surveyor and then in Pennsylvania real estate. In this capacity, he made some of the first surveys for the Pennsylvania railroad system.

Pennypacker's political career began in 1831 when he entered the Pennsylvania House of Representatives, representing Chester County. His served from 1832 to 1833 and from 1835 to 1836. During that time Pennypacker's work emphasized banking and public education. Subsequently, he served on the Pennsylvania Canal Commission, from 1836 to 1838.

== Stationmaster ==
In 1841, Pennypacker joined the Religious Society of Friends (Quakers). The religious group was active in the anti-slavery movement, and Pennypacker began his work as an abolitionist at that time. His anti-slavery sentiment was influenced by Thaddeus Stevens, with whom Pennypacker served in the Pennsylvania State Assembly. By 1840, Pennypacker was active in the Underground Railroad.

As a safe house operator, Pennypacker is an example of a conductor and of a stationmaster in the Underground Railroad, railroad terminology often being used in this context.

During the time that Pennypacker was active in the Underground Railroad, runaway slaves typically traveled along the shores of the Chesapeake Bay, crossing the Susquehanna River at Havre de Grace, Maryland, and then on to Pennypacker's safe house (depot in the Underground Railroad) in Phoenixville. At that point, Pennypacker helped them to various cities in southeast Pennsylvania, including Philadelphia, Norristown, Quakertown, and Reading, from where the fugitive slaves could realize their freedom. On occasion, Pennypacker worked with abolitionist William Still of the Philadelphia Vigilance Committee to arrange for committee members to meet fugitive slaves upon their departure from Pennypacker's safe house, runaway slaves sometimes departing by actual trains. Some of the fugitive slaves were personally transported by Pennypacker, and none were ever apprehended in Pennypacker's Underground Railroad operations.

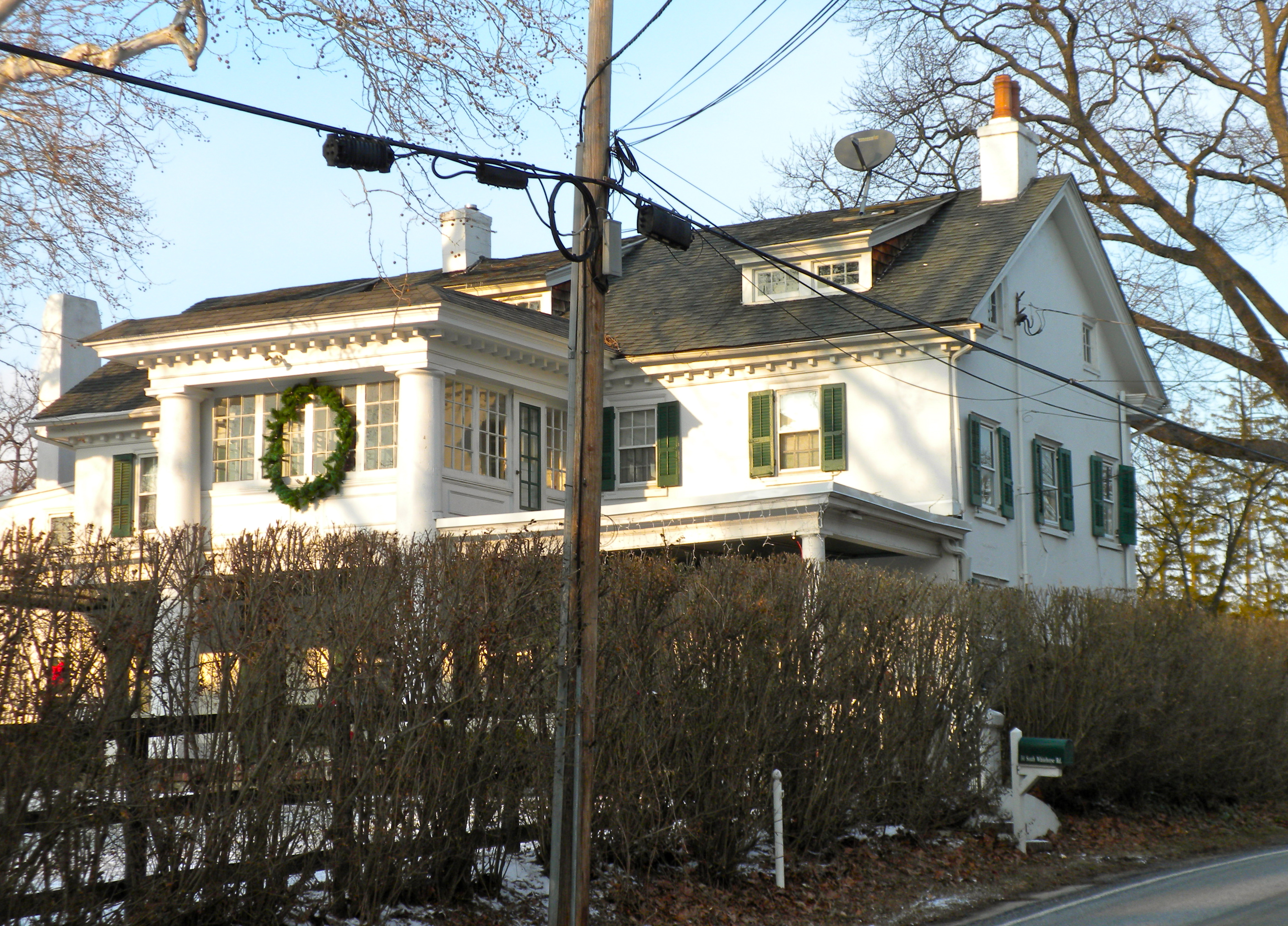
White Horse Farm was Pennypacker's home and safe house in the Underground Railroad

Pennypacker's safe house was his family home, White Horse Farm, originally constructed in 1770 and located in Schuylkill Township, Pennsylvania. The farm house was Pennypacker's own home for the duration of his life. During the years prior to emancipation, Pennypacker served in the local, county, and statewide anti-slavery societies.

External media
- Media links for Elijah Pennypacker

Images
- A photographic portrait of Pennypacker, courtesy of Montgomery County Pennypacker Mills

Video
- A video biography of Pennypacker, from Timeless Tales of Phoenixville

Pennypacker's activities in the Underground Railroad and those of Dr. Bartholomew Fussell were complementary in Chester County, Pennsylvania. Pennypacker aided hundreds of runaway slaves in their efforts to achieve freedom.

Abolitionist John G. Whittier paid tribute to Pennypacker stating:

In mind, body, and brave championship of the cause of freedom he was one of the most remarkable men I ever knew.

In addition to his involvement in the abolition movement, Pennypacker aided famine-stricken Irish in 1848.

After the American Civil War, Pennypacker became a member of the Prohibition Party, and ran unsuccessfully for public office as a member of the Prohibition Party. He also was a founder and an officer in the Pennsylvania Mutual Fire Insurance Company.

== Personal life ==
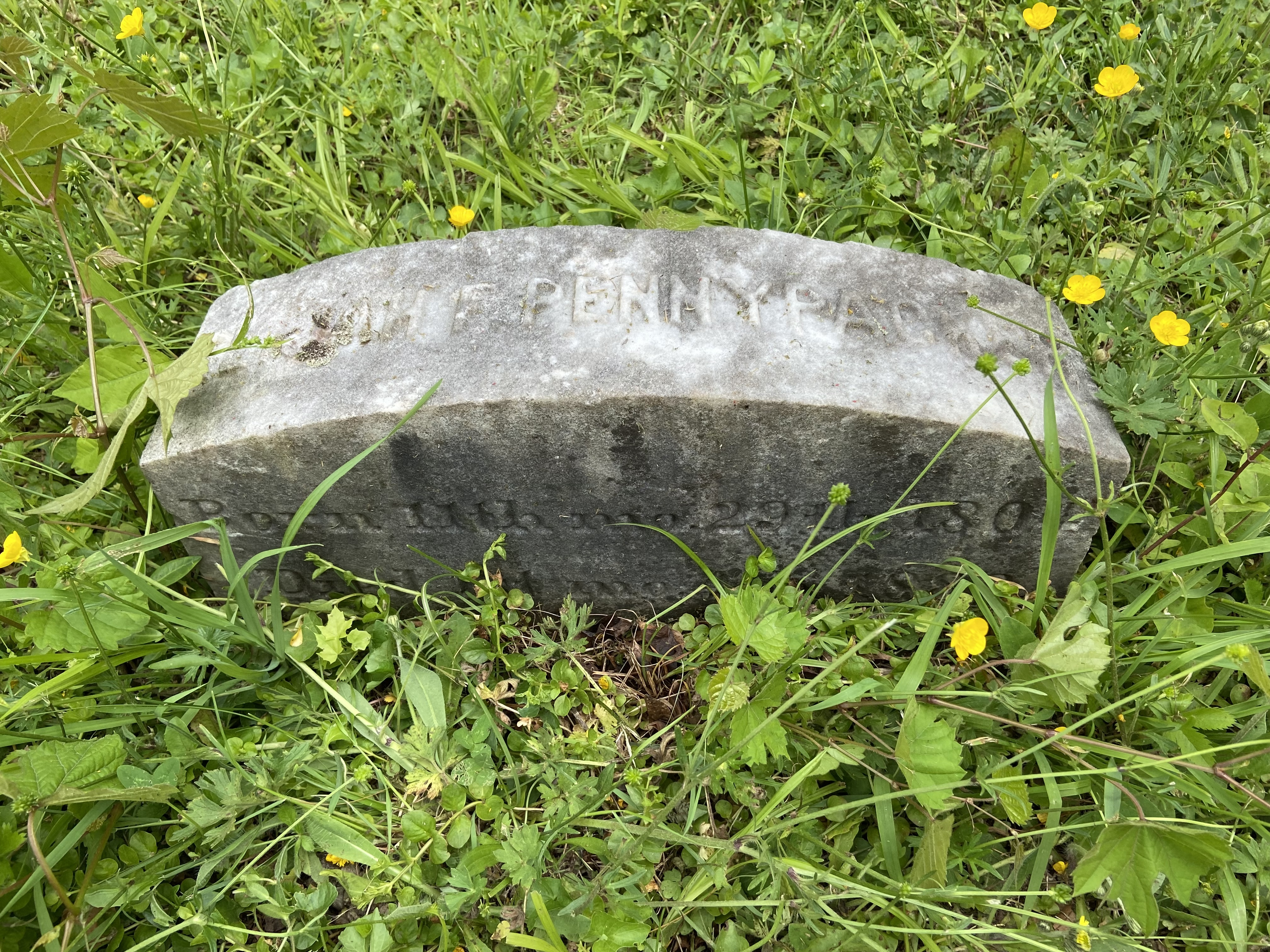
Grave of Pennypacker at Schuylkill Friends Meeting Cemetery

In 1831, Pennypacker married Sarah W. Coates of Chester County. They had no children and she died in 1841. In 1843, he married Hannah Adamson, daughter of Charles Adamson. They had nine children, Gertrude, Charles, Mary, Elijah J., Sarah C., Caroline B., Elizabeth, Margaret and Sumner.

Pennypacker died on January 4, 1888, and was buried at the Schuylkill Friends Meeting Cemetery in Phoenixville, Pennsylvania.

== See also ==
- Quakers in the Abolition Movement
