= Baptist Church in the Great Valley =

Historic Baptist church in Devon, Pennsylvania

Coordinates: 40°03′57″N 75°25′57″W

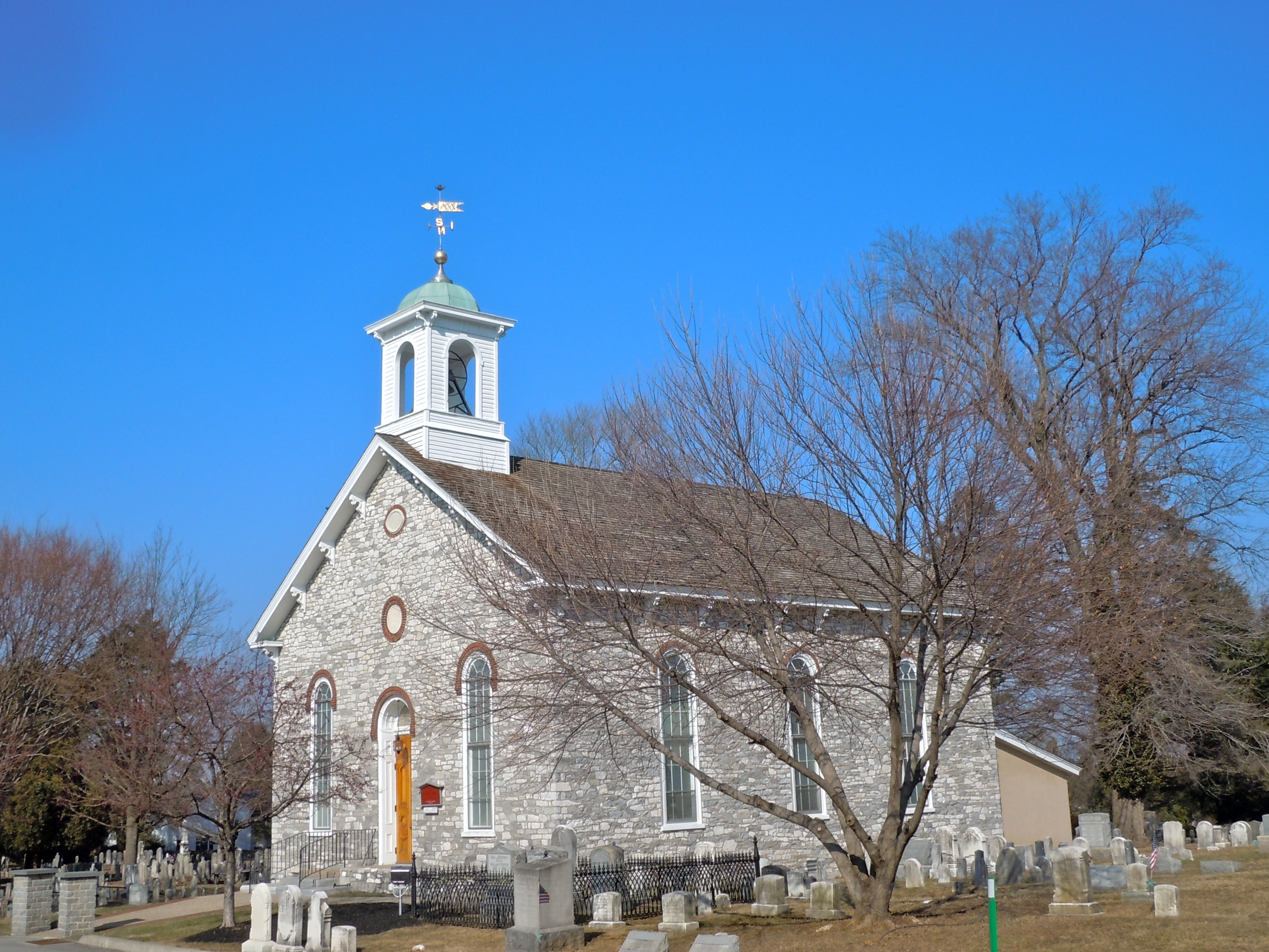
- Location: 945 North Valley Forge Road; Devon, Pennsylvania 19333
- Country: United States
- Denomination: Baptist
- Website: bcgv.org

History
- Founded: 1711

Architecture
- Completed: 1805

Clergy
- Pastor: Rev. Rebecca Driscoll Mygatt

The Baptist Church in the Great Valley is a historic American Baptist church in Devon, Tredyffrin Township, Pennsylvania.

== Description and history ==
Invited to settle there by William Penn, sixteen Welsh Baptists and their families founded the congregation on April 22, 1711. Preceded by a smaller log meetinghouse built in 1722, the current stone church building was erected in 1805. It is the third oldest Baptist church in Pennsylvania. A Pennsylvania state historical marker was placed at the location in 1951.

The church figured in the region's involvement in the American Revolutionary War. Like most of his parishioners, Reverend David Jones was an ardent Patriot and served as a Continental Army chaplain. British troops under General William Howe plundered the church and parsonage in September 1776, carrying off clothing, dishware, tools, and a Bible.

Its first congregant of color, Harry Coats, joined the church in 1762. A schism occurred in 1841, when following the resignation of abolitionist pastor Leonard Fletcher in 1840, a group of antislavery parishioners withdrew to form their own congregation in nearby Radnor. In 1820, women received the right to vote on "all questions that may arise in the church."

== See also ==
- List of Pennsylvania state historical markers in Chester County
