= White Horse Farm =

Historic house in Pennsylvania, United States

- U.S. National Register of Historic Places
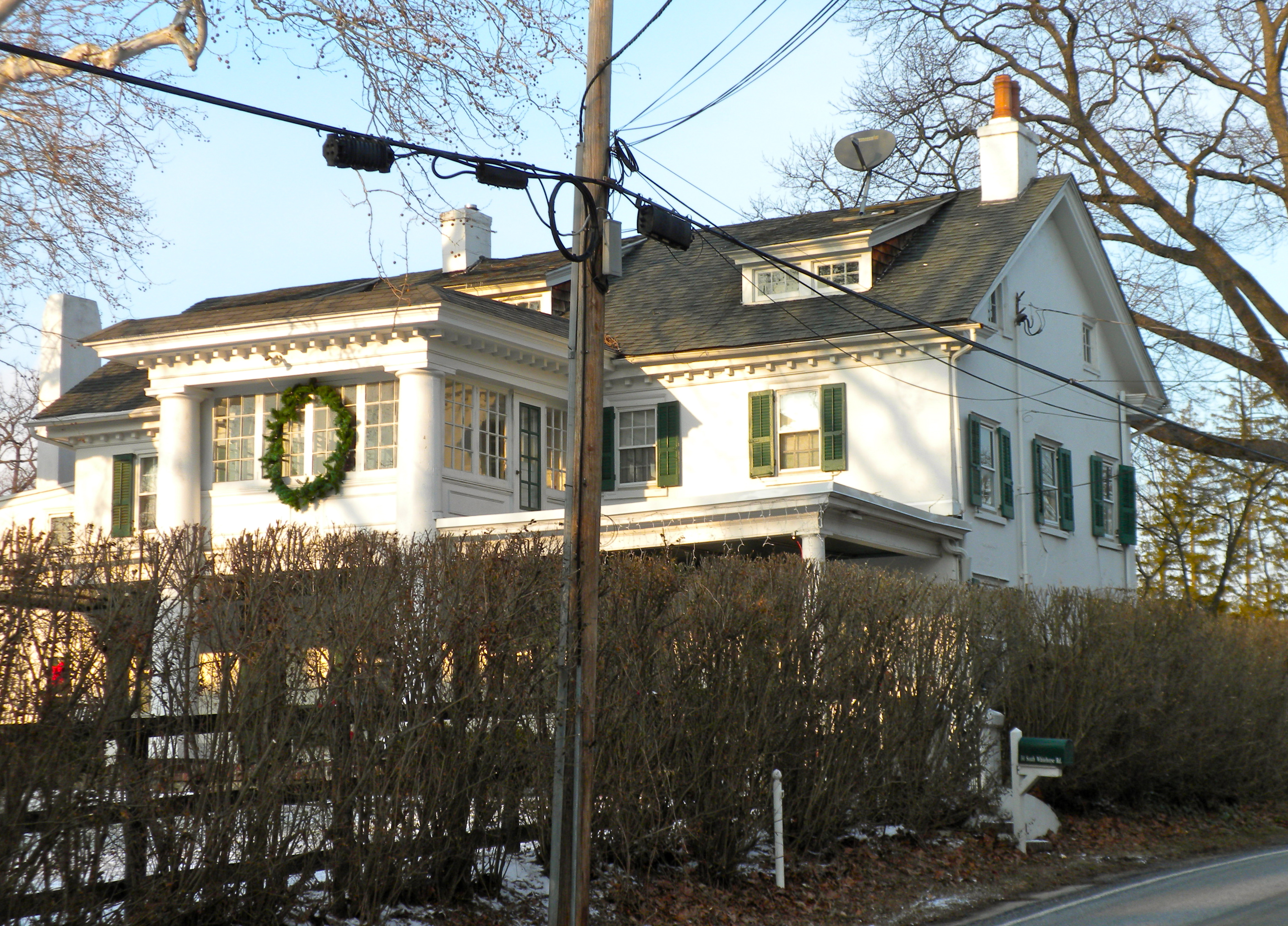
- White Horse Farm, January 2010

- Location within Pennsylvania Location within the United States
- Location: 54 South Whitehorse Road, Schuylkill Township, Pennsylvania
- Coordinates: 40°7′6″N 75°30′19″W
- Area: 0.8 acres (0.32 ha)
- Built: c. 1770, c. 1810, c. 1840, 1915
- Architectural style: Colonial Revival, Georgian Revival
- NRHP reference No.: 87001206
- Added to NRHP: July 29, 1987

White Horse Farm, also known as the Elijah F. Pennypacker House, is a historic home and farm located in Schuylkill Township, Chester County, Pennsylvania. The original section was built around 1770. In the 19th century, it was the home of abolitionist Elijah F. Pennypacker and served as a station on the Underground Railroad. The farm was added to the National Register of Historic Places in 1987.

== History ==
Elijah F. Pennypacker (1804-1888) served in the Pennsylvania State Legislature as a colleague of Thaddeus Stevens from 1831 until 1836, when he left to focus on the antislavery cause. He became president of the Chester County and Pennsylvania abolitionist societies. In 1840 his home became a station on the Underground Railroad. Fugitive slaves arrived from three different routes, and were sent north to Norristown and other stations to the north and east. Poet and abolitionist John Greenleaf Whittier said of Pennypacker, "In mind, body, and brave championship of the cause of freedom, he was one of the most remarkable men I ever knew."

The house is a 2 1/2-story, stuccoed stone structure with a gable roof. The oldest section dates to about 1770, as a simple two-story, two bay one room over one room house. About 1810, a two bay section was added to the north, and about 1840 a two-story, two bay frame section was added to it. The house was remodeled and expanded in 1915, with the addition of a two-story rear section and one / two-story front verandah with Doric order capitals. The remodeling incorporated Georgian Revival design details. Also on the property are a contributing barn (c. 1810) and spring house.
