= Okehocking Historic District =

Historic district in Pennsylvania, United States

- U.S. National Register of Historic Places
- U.S. Historic district
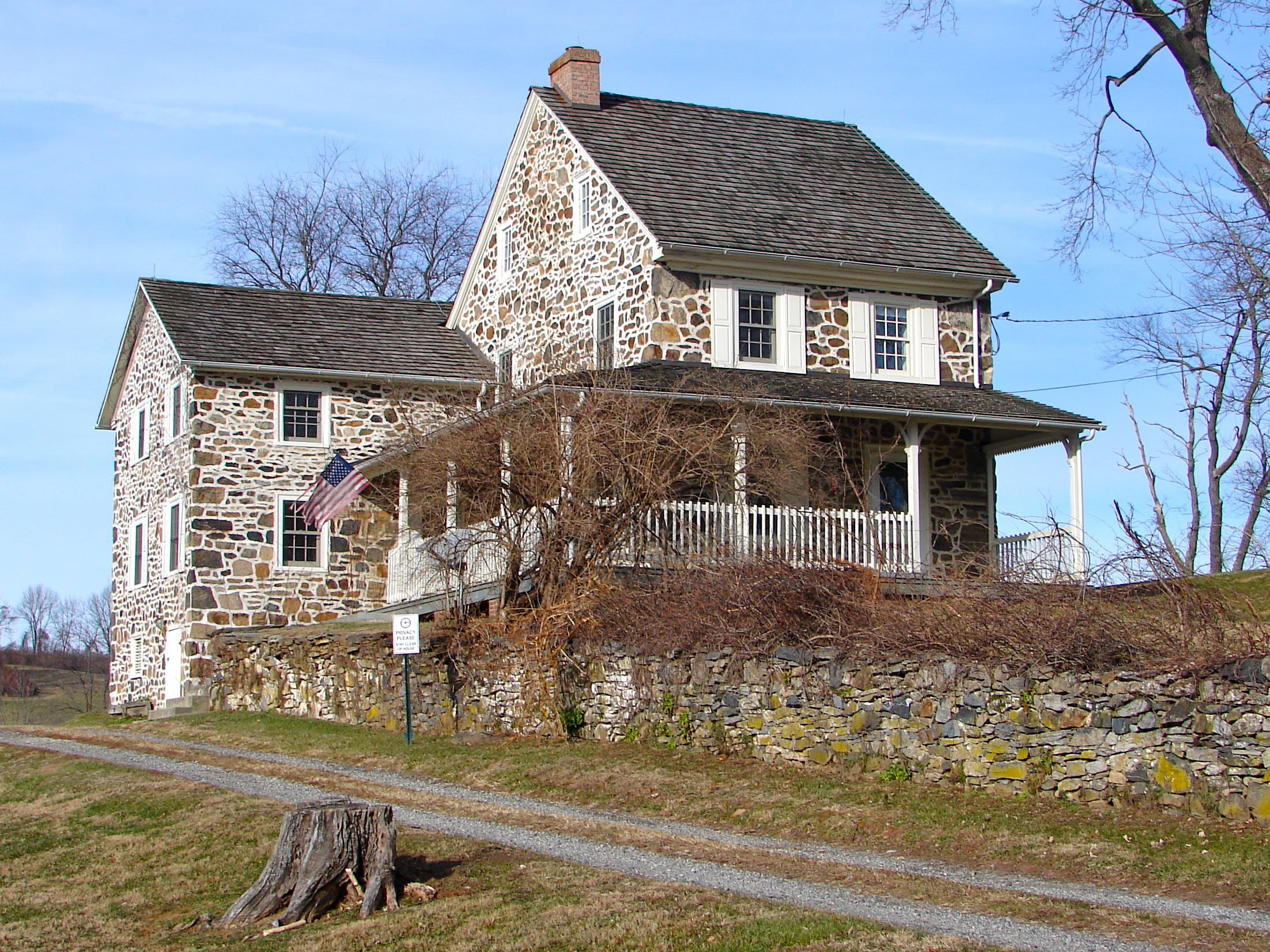
- House in the Okehocking Historic District, December 2010

- Location within Pennsylvania Location within the United States
- Location: Roughly bounded by West Chester Pike, Plumsock Road, Goshen Road, and Garrett Mill Road, near Media, Willistown Township, Pennsylvania
- Coordinates: 39°58′35″N 75°30′30″W
- Area: 1,400 acres (570 ha)
- Built: 1703
- Architect: Multiple
- Architectural style: Colonial Revival
- NRHP reference No.: 93000719
- Added to NRHP: August 2, 1993

Okehocking Historic District, also known as the Okehocking Indian Land Grant Historic District, is a national historic district in Willistown Township, Chester County, Pennsylvania. It was listed on the National Register of Historic Places in 1993.

== Description and history ==
The historic district encompasses 69 contributing buildings, 5 contributing sites, 2 contributing structures, and 1 contributing object in a rural area near Media. A majority of the buildings were built before 1845. The district features an assortment of 18th-century and 19th-century farmhouses and related outbuildings located on a 500-acre Indian land grant by William Penn to the Okehocking band of Lenape, established in 1703. Notable contributing assets include a Willistown Friends Meetinghouse and its burial ground, a one-room school known as the Willistown School No. 6, a former inn known as the Rising Sun Tavern, the vacated Smedley Mill, and three mill sites: the Garrett Mill, Duckett Mill, and George Matlack's sawmill.

Dedicated on June 21, 1924, a Pennsylvania state historical marker commemorates the location of the former Okehocking Indian Town. The marker consists of a bronze tablet affixed to a large natural boulder, which declares the Okehocking Indian Town to be "the only Indian Reservation the Proprietor [William Penn] ever established." Archaeologists have not uncovered evidence of a permanent Lenape village—the band was probably nomadic and lived in tent-like dwellings that left little trace.

== Willistown Friends Meeting House ==
Willistown Friends Meeting House, located near the northeast corner of the district at the intersection of Goshen Road and Warren Avenue, was built in 1798. The earliest European settlers in the area were Quakers who attended meetings for worship at Goshen or Middletown. In 1753 Francis and Ann Smedley donated a small plot of land on Plumsock Road to build a school, which was torn down in 1873. After Francis's death, Ann Smedley donated adjacent land for a burial ground and the meeting house. The meeting owns about 25 acres around the meeting house to protect the rural character of the site. Membership in the meeting had decreased to about five families in the 1950s, but as of 1998 membership had risen to 99 families.

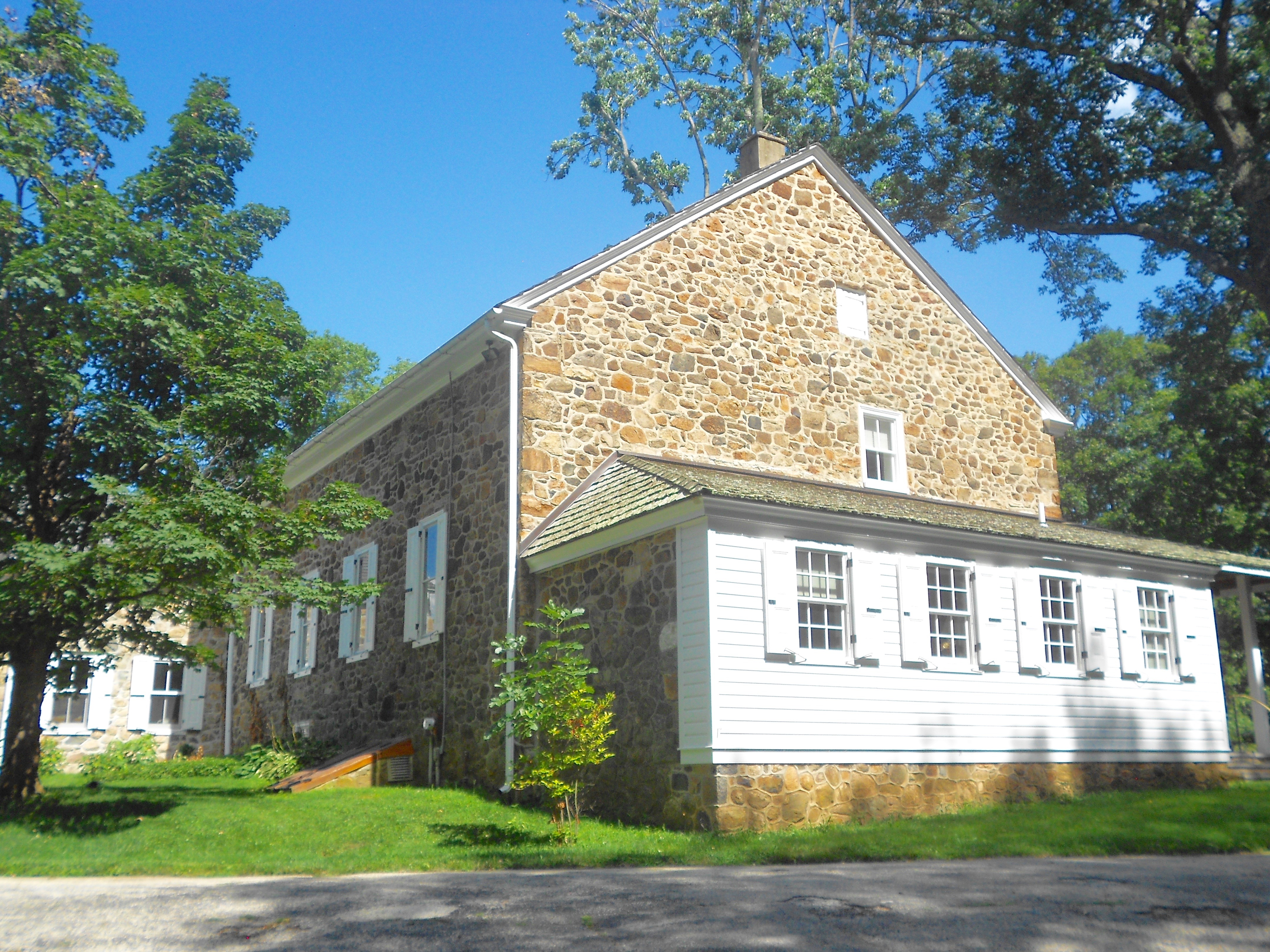
Willistown Friends Meeting House

== See also ==
- List of Pennsylvania state historical markers in Chester County
- National Register of Historic Places listings in eastern Chester County, Pennsylvania
