= Mount Zion A.M.E. Church (Tredyffrin Township, Pennsylvania) =

- U.S. National Register of Historic Places
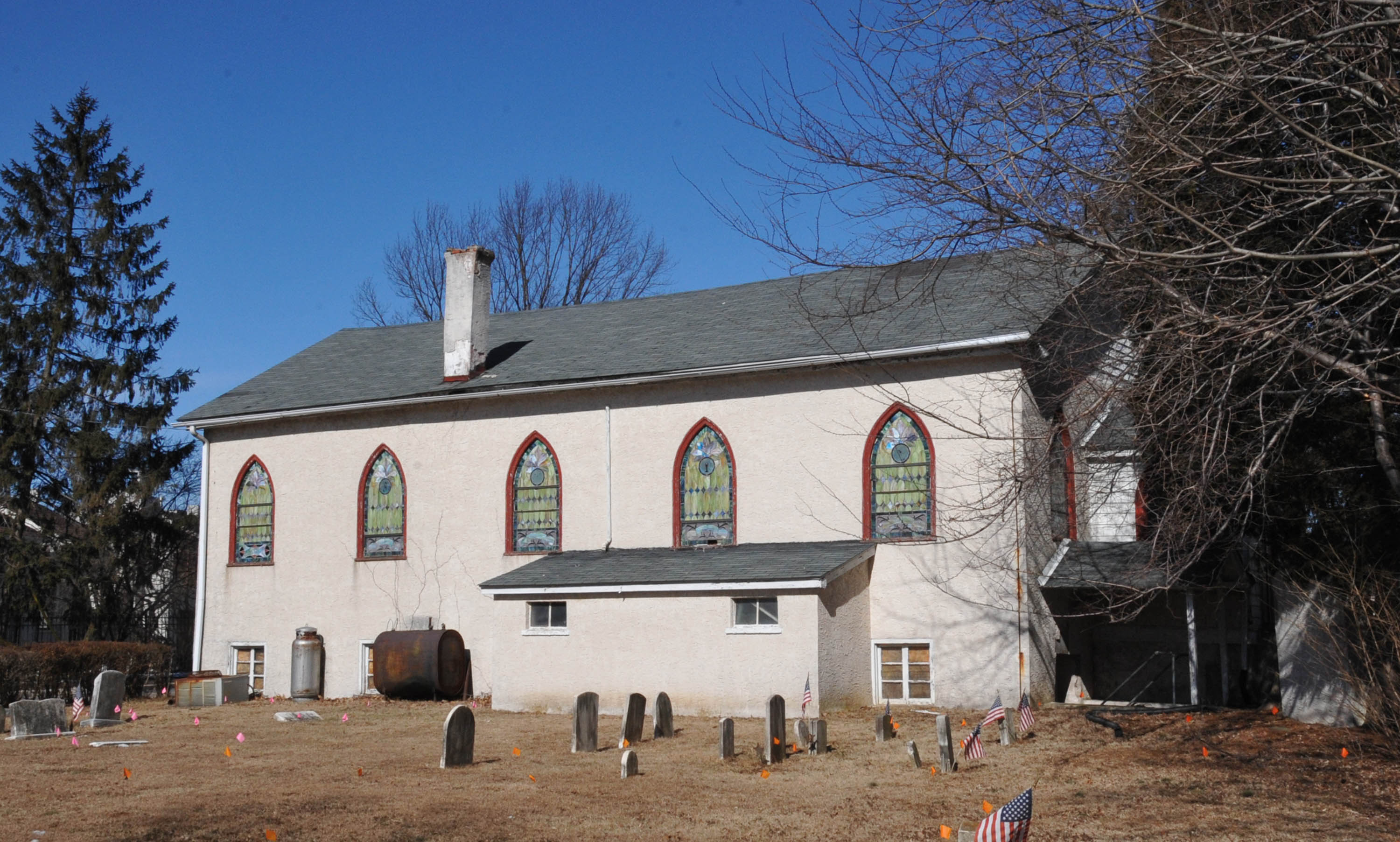
- Mount Zion in 2008

- Location within Pennsylvania Location within the United States
- Location: 380 North Fairfield Road; Devon, PA 19333
- Coordinates: 40°03′23″N 75°26′03″W
- Built: 1880
- NRHP reference No.: 14001220
- Added to NRHP: January 27, 2015

Mount Zion A.M.E. Church is a historic African American church in Tredyffrin Township, Chester County, Pennsylvania. Built in 1880 and expanded in 1906, Mount Zion was listed on the National Register of Historic Places on January 27, 2015. It was an important community gathering place for African Americans battling racial segregation of local schools in the 1930s.

== Description and history ==
Organized in 1861, completed circa 1880, and rebuilt and enlarged in 1906, the Mount Zion A.M.E. Church consists of a one-story stucco-over-stone building with a gable roof of asphalt shingles. The church added stained glass windows in 1922 and a low-ceiling addition for restrooms circa 1950. The main entrance is on the church's east side, off a vestibule comprising frame walls clad with wooden shingles. A cemetery and a church built in 1991 are located on the south side of the historic building, which is no longer used for most church services. Mount Zion is affiliated with the African Methodist Episcopal Church.

Mount Zion was a community gathering place during the Berwyn School Fight (1932–1934), when Black residents of Tredyffrin and Easttown Township successfully campaigned against attempts to segregate local public schools along racial lines. With the support of the NAACP, African Americans boycotted the schools, keeping their children home until the authorities finally agreed to reintegrate the schools. This civil rights victory led to the passage of the Pennsylvania Equal Rights Bill in 1935.

A Pennsylvania state historical marker commemorating the Berwyn School Fight was installed at Mount Zion in November 2020. Per the Pennsylvania Historical Museum & Commission, Mount Zion is the first recorded African American congregation of any denomination and is the oldest continuous African Methodist Episcopal Church assembly in the Philadelphia area.

== See also ==
- List of Pennsylvania state historical markers in Chester County
- National Register of Historic Places listings in eastern Chester County, Pennsylvania
