= Okehocking people =

Small Lenape band native to Pennsylvania

Okehocking Crum Creek Indians
Total population
- c. 15–25 in 1702

Regions with significant populations
- Along Ridley and Crum Creeks until c. 1701. On Okehocking tract near Ridley Creek from c. 1701 to c. 1730. Possibly Quintiphilla after c. 1730.

Languages
- Unami

Religion
- Lenape religion

Related ethnic groups
- Other Lenape bands and subgroups

The Okehocking (also erroneously attested as the Ockanickon or Crum Creek Indians) were a small band of Unami-speaking Lenape who originally inhabited an area along the Ridley and Crum Creeks in Delaware County, Pennsylvania. First attested in 1700, the band's name may have derived from the bends in Crum and Ridley Creeks. The group likely numbered between 15 and 25 individuals, and was unusually small for a Lenape band of the time.

Colonial pressures forced the band to relocate its summer settlement, leading the band to settle around 1701 on a vacant tract of land originally deeded to a Quaker settler. The Proprietary government of Pennsylvania directed surveyors to allot the band a tract along one of the creeks. After petitioning for land in 1702, they were granted 500 acres (200 ha), but were cut off from most of Ridley Creek and may have been granted mostly hilly, unfertile land by the colonists. In 1710, a colonial road was built through the Okehocking land.

Although most Lenape in the region had abandoned their lands by 1718, the Okehocking remained on the tract until the early 1730s. Afterwards, they resettled westwards, perhaps to the village of Quittaphilla, near present-day Lebanon. The last mention of the band is in 1737, although it has been suggested that a sub-clan of Lenape recorded in 1860 and 1913 are descendants of the Okehocking.

== Demographics ==
=== Etymology ===
According to Lenape speaker Nora Thompson Dean, the name "Okehocking" is a place name that may translate to 'the place surrounded', and is likely the band's endonym. The name may refer to land surrounded by a stream's bends. The name is consistent with the band's territory along Ridley Creek and Crum Creek in what is now Pennsylvania. The term "Crum" similarly derives from the Dutch word for 'bent', and may reflect Dutch traders either similarly describing the creek or translating from the Unami word for it. The band was also known as the Crum Creek Indians and initially had its name recorded as "Ockanickon". This may have resulted from the recorder mistaking the band's name for that of a prominent Lenape elder in present-day New Jersey named Ockanickon. The two names are likely unrelated. Another source gives the name of the band as the Oke, with the name Okehoking deriving from it as a toponym.

=== Population ===
The Okehocking were probably an unusually small band even by the standards of the foraging Lenape, with only 3 adult males recorded in 1702. Since they are not referred to as "chiefs", they were likely respected elders. Although reference is made to "others" in a 1702 survey warrant, there were probably no more than 3 or 4 other heads of families in the band. Based on these numbers, the total population of the Okehocking in 1702 probably numbered between 15 and 25. At a time when families of 10 in colonial Pennsylvania were granted about 200–300 acres (80–120 ha), the estimate of 25 band members is consistent with the 500 acres (200 ha) grant given to the Okehocking. Pennsylvania's Proprietors would have regarded the grant as too small for any larger group.

== History ==
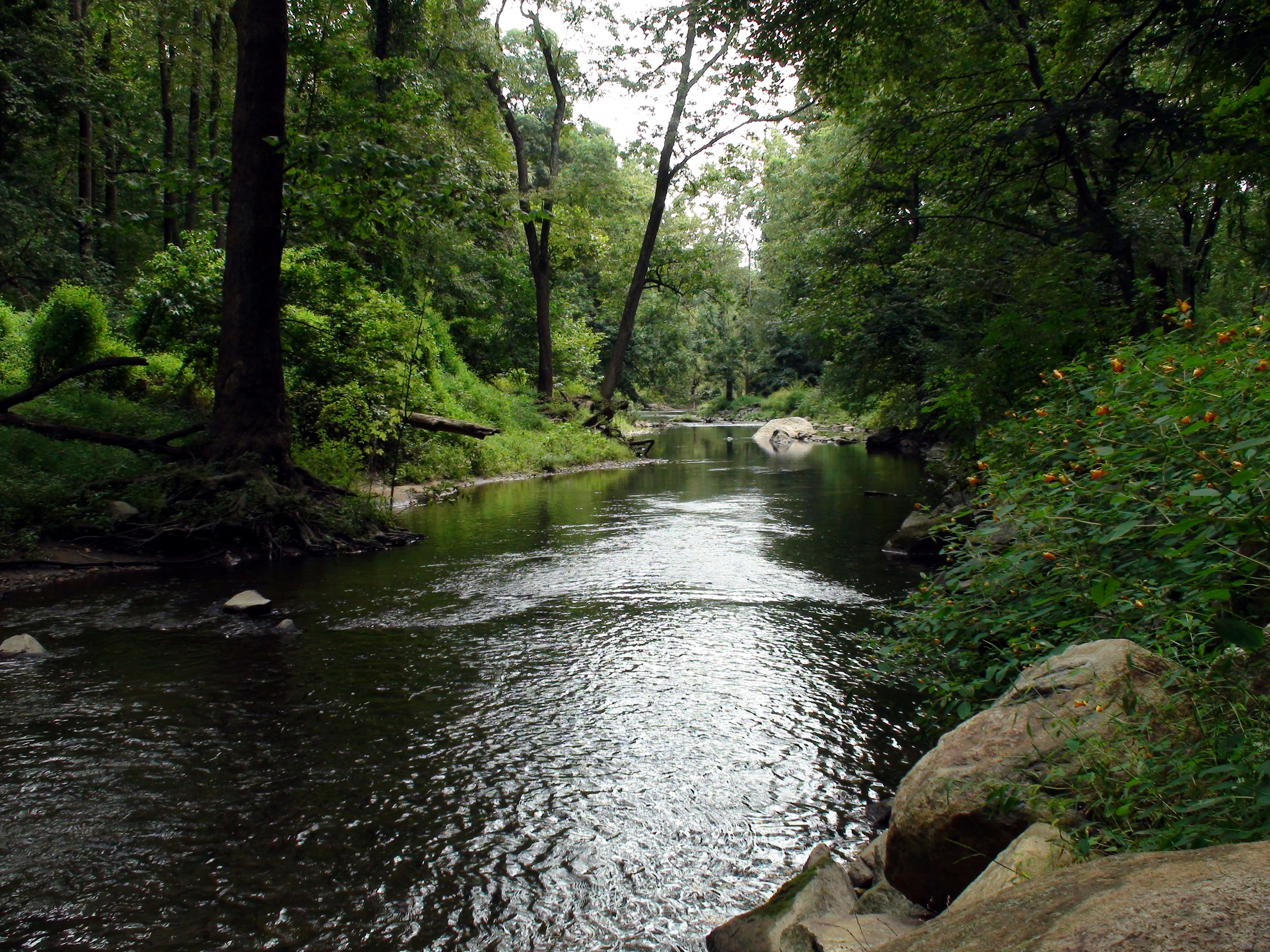
The Okehocking are first known to have lived and foraged between Ridley Creek (pictured) and Crum Creek.

=== Early accounts and settlement (c. 1680–1701) ===
The Okehocking are first historically attested in 1700, about 70 years after European trade began in the Lenape area. Prior to European encroachment, the band was initially known to inhabit the area along and between the Crum and Ridley Creeks, and likely foraged inland beyond the creeks and along the Delaware River. The Okehocking probably had a summer settlement in the vicinity of the Delaware. None of the band's village names have been recorded. Rapid English settlement in the region after 1680 disturbed the local Lenape, including the Okehocking. Despite growing colonization in the surrounding territory, in what is now Edgmont Township, Pennsylvania, Proprietor William Penn did not award land grants in the area inhabited by the band, in keeping with his policy of not settling areas occupied by natives. Probably to avoid the expanding colonial construction, population, and deforestation, the Okehocking were pressured to move their summer settlement further up the river to an area free of settlers.

By 1701, either on their own initiative or advice from the Proprietors, they had settled on a vacant 1,920 acres (780 ha) tract of land between the creeks originally deeded to a Quaker named Griffith Jones in 1686. Jones's plot was within a larger tract claimed by an association of Welsh speaking Quakers and had not been settled, reverting to William Penn under colonial law. In 1701, Abraham Beaks petitioned for the vacant tract, prompting a survey to be ordered by the Proprietary on 11 December 1701. Although Beaks did not receive the land, the survey was granted. The warrant directed the surveyors, Caleb Pusey, Nicholas Pile, and Nathaniel Newland, to locate a creekside lot for the settlement of the Okehocking.

The manner of relocation has been a subject of debate. Historian C. A. Weslager claims that Penn "arranged for the resettlement" of the Okehocking. However, Marshall Becker, another historian, discounts Weslager's interpretation as based on a flawed post-1890 account, and suggests that the band may have requested a secure tract within their traditional territory and had been offered part of the vacant Jones tract, to be determined by the surveyors. In either case, the band had settled on the tract by the winter of 1701.

=== Ownership of land tract (1701–1730) ===
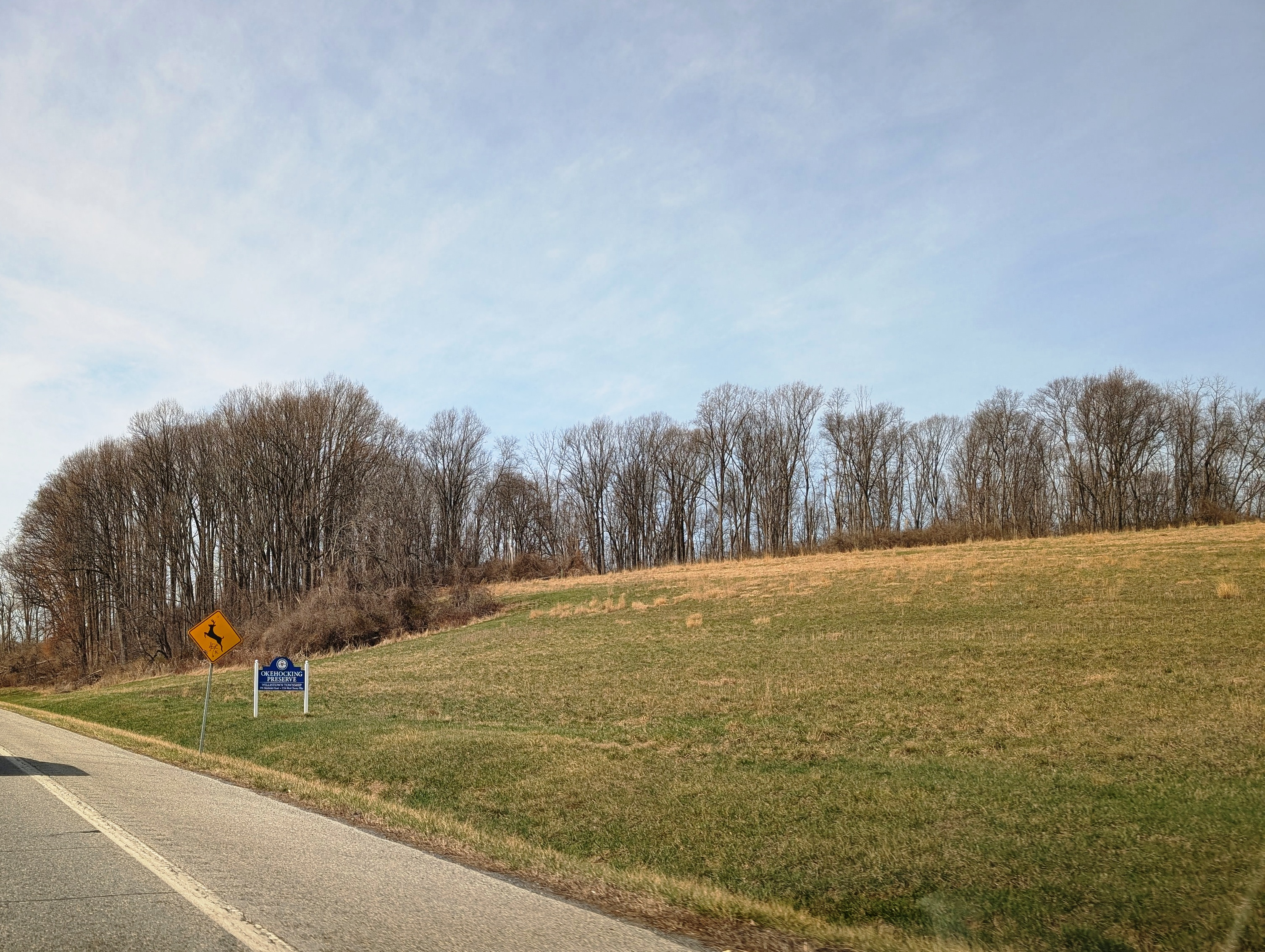
Okehocking Preserve (pictured) is a present-day remnant of the original land granted to the Okehocking band in 1703.

Possibly waiting to be certain that native land claims had been settled, the Proprietors began selling land in the area after the survey was completed. In 1702, Jonathan Bowater was granted 400 acres (162 ha) on the far western end of the vacant tract. (Note: The area of Bowater's grant had previously been granted to Mary Sibthorp ten years earlier. Becker writes that the decade between Sibthorp's grant and the ultimate grant to Bowater indicates a concern with the land rights of the band.) Even though Bowater likely selected his plot to avoid contact with the Lenape settlements, the sale of land around them still worried the Okehocking, who still had no official colonial land grant in writing and felt insecure in their settlements. In December 1702, two weeks after Bowater received his land grant, the band petitioned for an official land tract from colonial authorities. (Note: This petition is the first recorded mention of the band's name, misrecorded as "Ockanickon".) The band's decision to conform to the colonial land system ensured that both the colonial and indigenous parties operated on equal footing. The colony issued a warrant for another survey a week later, undertaken by Chester County surveyor Isaac Taylor. Three Okehocking leaders, named as Pokais, Sepopawny, and Muttagoopa, and "others" were to be granted a 500 acres (202 ha) tract under the condition that they never transfer, sell, or dispose of it. If the band vacated the land, it would revert to the Proprietors.

The actual survey was only completed ten months later, on October 10, 1703. Despite Abraham Beaks' request that the band be given land along the creeks, and the order for the surveyors to grant land according to the band's "desire", the land granted to the Okehocking was poor for agriculture and contained only small stretches of Ridley and Crum creeks. The band was cut off from much of Ridley Creek by the land belonging to Charles Whitacre. Whitacre may have conspired with the surveying team to grant primarily hilly land to the Okehocking and exclude them from the most fertile, creekside areas. The tract as measured came to 484 acres (196 ha), less than apportioned to the band but within the margin of error for the time.

Much of the land was left forested by the band, and was not used for agriculture. In 1710, the Okehocking hosted a gathering of regional Lenape on their land. Later that year, local colonists chartered a road splitting the Lenape land. The road may have been viewed by colonists as providing the Okehocking with easier access to their winter hunting grounds further inland, which had been cut off by settler land. However, the road's unusual placement through the tract rather than along its edge, as was more common at the time, indicates that colonists felt free to disregard the band's property rights. The road probably also accelerated the commercial development and settlement of the area. Although the court ordered a delay, possibly due to worries from the band, the road was built and is today the Delchester Road. Most mentions of the Okehocking until 1737 are from surveys of surrounding land, which made reference to the band's tract to set boundaries. In 1726, the Okehocking continued to own the tract in its entirety.

=== Departure from homeland (1730–1737) ===
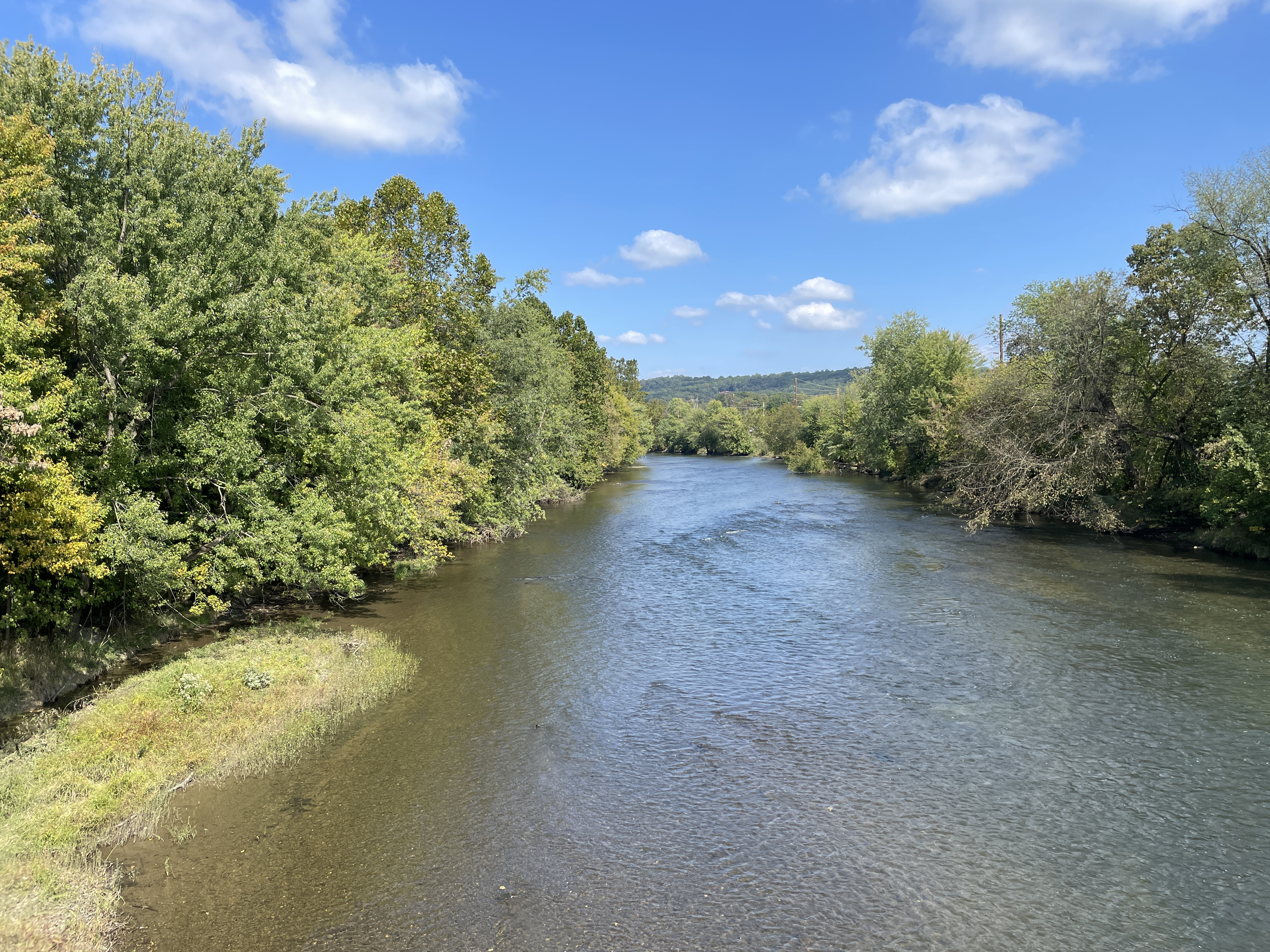
The Okehocking may have resettled near the village of Quittaphilla on Swatara Creek (pictured).

Although local Lenape individuals had been resettling westward since at least 1690, and despite the cession of most indigenous lands to colonists, agreed to by Lenape leader Sassoonan in 1718, the Okehocking continued to live on their land until at least 1730. The difficulty of maintaining their traditional lifestyle due to the introduction of European goods prompted the band and the nearby Brandywine band to leave their traditional land sometime between 1730 and 1735. Although it has been suggested that part of the band may have split off in 1718 and joined Sasoonan at the settlement of Tulpehocken, there is no evidence for this. It has also been suggested that the Okehocking joined the Schuylkill band in moving to the multiethnic settlement of Shamokin in 1732, which there is also no direct evidence for. The band spent a period of about 30 years on the tract, comparable to other Lenape horticultural villages.

In 1737, some Okehocking were living in a settlement on Swatara Creek, about 75 kilometers (47 miles) away from their former lands. Marshall Becker suggests that this site may have been the village of Quittaphilla, in present-day Lebanon, or one of its "satellite locations". Quittaphilla was probably abandoned in 1748. The Okehocking do not appear in historical accounts after 1737, and most likely joined other Lenape in continuing their migration westward.

In 1860, the name "Okahocki" was recorded by Henry Lewis Morgan as a sub-clan of the Turtle clan on the Lenape reservation in Kansas. In 1913, M. R. Harrington noted that social groups called the "Okehoki" and "Opinghoki" still existed among the Kansas Lenape. Becker suggests that these may be the descendants of the Okehocking, and that the band continued to exist as a social unit until the 20th century.

== See also ==
- Okehocking Historic District, about seven miles (11 km) west of Newtown Square, Pennsylvania

== Works cited ==
- Becker, Marshall J. (1976). "The Okehocking: A remnant band of Delaware Indians". Pennsylvania Archaeologist. 46 (3): 24–61.
- Becker, Marshall (1986). “The Okehocking Band of Lenape: Cultural Continuities and Accommodations in Southeastern Pennsylvania.” In Strategies For Survival: American Indians in the Eastern United States, edited by Frank W. Porter III. Greenwood Press.
- Nagy, John C.; Goulding, Penny Teaf, eds. (2006) Acres of Quakers: an architectural & cultural history of Willistown Township, Chester County, Pennsylvania, from first settlement through 1900. Malvern, Pa: Willistown Township Historical Commission. ISBN 978-0-9776994-0-7. OCLC 77560108.
- Rayapati, Jacob P. (2014), Lnape Heritage in American Place Names, The Institute for Cultural & Healing Traditions, Ltd
- Weslager, C. A. (1972). The Delaware Indians: A History. New Brunswick, NJ: Rutgers University Press. ISBN 978-0-8135-0702-6.
