= Gen. Frederick Von Steuben Headquarters =

Historic house in Pennsylvania, United States

- General Friedrich Von Steuben Headquarters
- U.S. National Register of Historic Places
- U.S. National Historic Landmark
- U.S. National Historic Landmark District – Contributing property
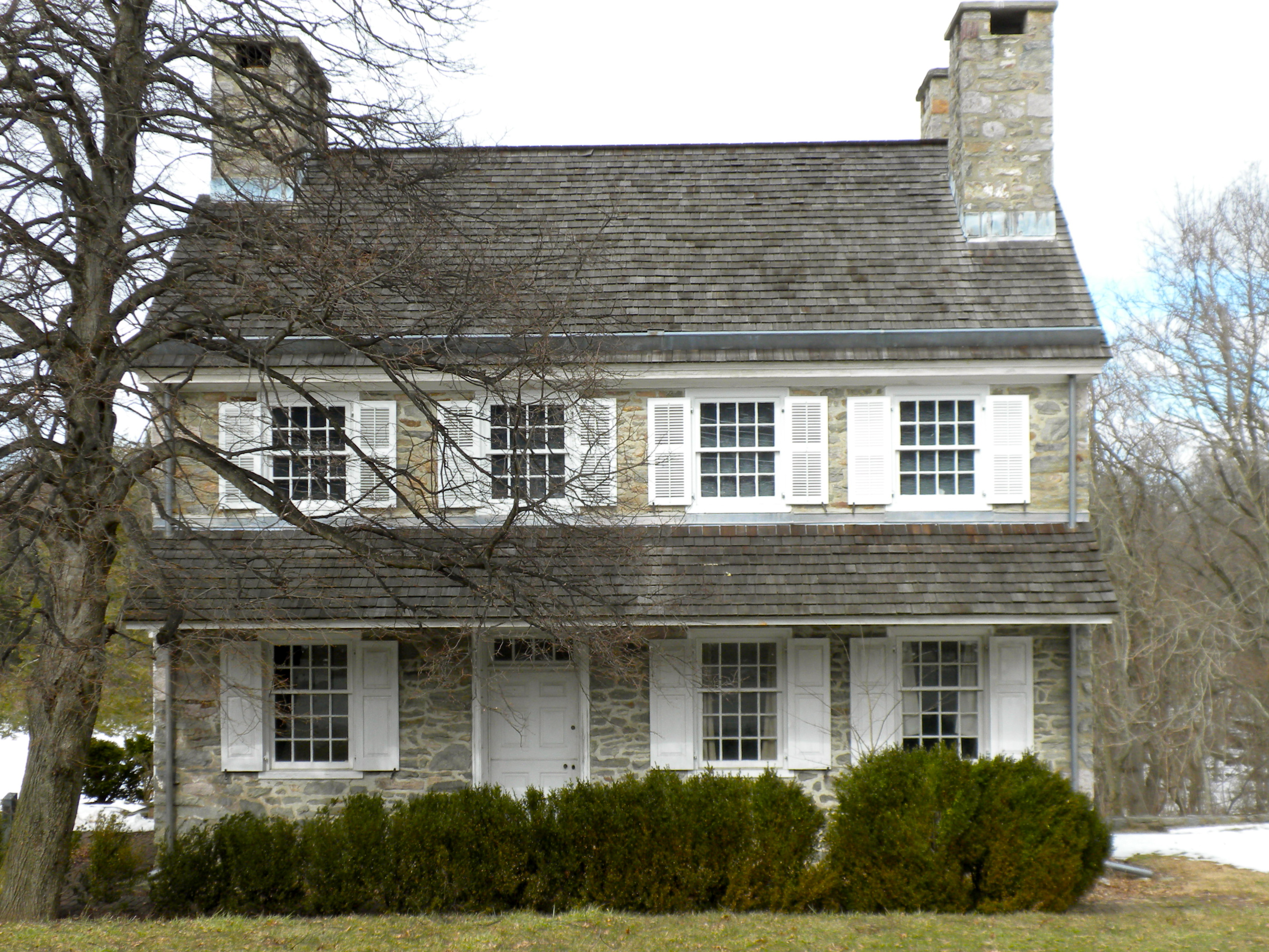
- Building in March 2010

- Location within Pennsylvania Location within the United States
- Location: PA 23, Valley Forge National Historical Park, Pennsylvania
- Coordinates: 40°5′55.98″N 75°28′13″W
- Built: 1770
- Part of: Valley Forge (ID66000657)
- NRHP reference No.: 72001108

Significant dates
- Added to NRHP: November 28, 1972
- Designated NHL: November 28, 1972
- Designated NHLDCP: January 20, 1961

The General Friedrich Von Steuben Headquarters is a historic house on Pennsylvania Route 23 in Valley Forge National Historical Park in Chester County, Pennsylvania. Built about 1770, it has been advanced as a possible residence of Baron Friedrich von Steuben (1730-1794), the Prussian drill-master of Continental Army troops during the 1777-78 Valley Forge encampment. The house, which is a partial reconstruction, was declared a National Historic Landmark in 1972.

== Description and history ==
The Von Steuben Headquarters House is located near the western edge of Valley Forge National Historical Park, on the north side of Pennsylvania Route 23, just east of the Valley Forge Post Office. A large parking area within the park boundary separates the two buildings. The house is a 2 1/2-story stone structure, with a gabled roof and three chimneys. The main facade is four bays wide, with the main entrance in the center-right bay. A pent roof separates the first and second floors of the main facade. The interior of the house is a reconstruction of a period 18th-century interior.

The house was built about 1770 for James White. Between February and June 1778 Baron Friedrich von Steuben, a Prussian military officer who offered his services to the American cause, was resident at Valley Forge, and may have lived in this building during at least part of that time. Von Steuben was responsible not only for drilling the troops encamped at Valley Forge, but also developed a manual of military practices that the United States Army used until 1814.

The house declined over the next 150 years, and was made part of Valley Forge State Park. The state restored the building in 1965 after its interior was gutted by fire, and served as a visitors center. It was designated a National Historic Landmark in 1972 for its claimed association with von Steuben. The park was given to the people of the United States by the state of Pennsylvania in 1976.

The building's exact use is a matter of some dispute among a variety of authorities, including the National Park Service. Its association with von Steuben was disputed during the 1950s and 1960s, and the restoration of its interior conducted by the state in 1966 was later questioned by the Park Service. Documentary evidence suggests the building was used as a camp hospital for at least part of the encampment period. The building now stands vacant, and serves as part of the park's historic landscape.

== See also ==
- National Register of Historic Places listings in Chester County, Pennsylvania
- List of National Historic Landmarks in Pennsylvania
