= Moses Coates Jr. Farm =

Historic house in Pennsylvania, United States

- U.S. National Register of Historic Places
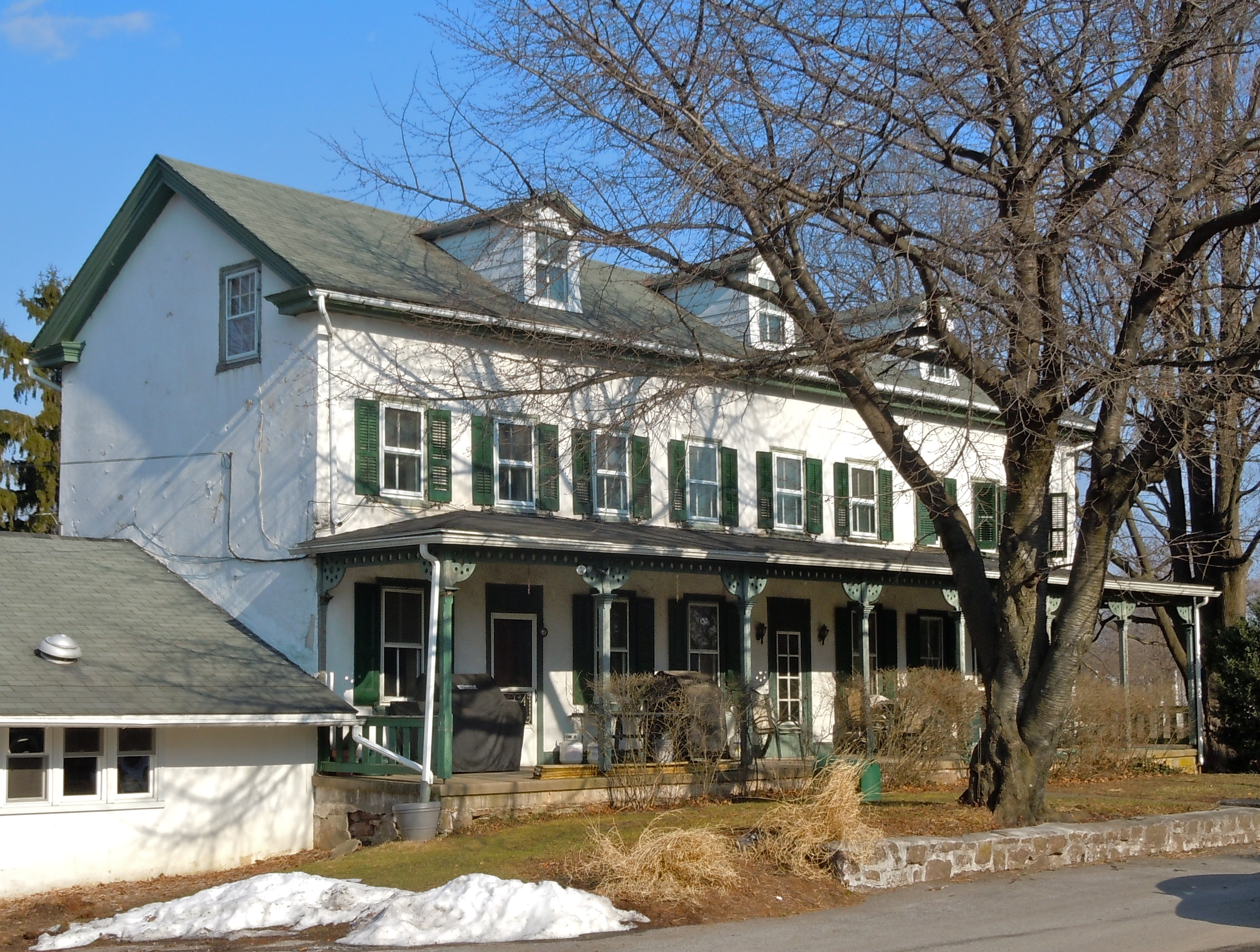
- Moses Coates Jr. Farmhouse, February 2011

- Location within Pennsylvania Location within the United States
- Location: 1416 State Road, Schuylkill Township, Pennsylvania
- Coordinates: 40°06′58″N 75°31′23″W
- Area: 3.3 acres (1.3 ha)
- Built: c. 1754, c. 1800, 1896, 1933
- Architectural style: Georgian
- NRHP reference No.: 84003186
- Added to NRHP: May 3, 1984

The Moses Coates Jr. Farm, also known as Meadow Brook Farm, is an historic home and farm complex that is located in Schuylkill Township, Chester County, Pennsylvania, United States.

It was listed on the National Register of Historic Places in 1984.

== History and architectural features ==
This historic house is a 2 1/2-story, ell-shaped, stuccoed, stone structure with a gable roof. The oldest section dates to circa 1754, as a two-story, six-bay, two-room-over-two-room house that was designed in the Georgian style. Sometime around 1800, a three-bay section was added. Further expansion was then made in 1896 with the house renovated in 1933 for use as a clubhouse, at which time the property was converted to a nine-hole golf course. Also located on the property are a contributing bank barn, a carriage house, and two spring houses. During the American Revolution the house served as officer's quarters for American officers in late-1777 and early-1778, in conjunction with the encampment at Valley Forge.
