= Moore Hall (Phoenixville, Pennsylvania) =

Historic house in Pennsylvania, United States

- U.S. National Register of Historic Places
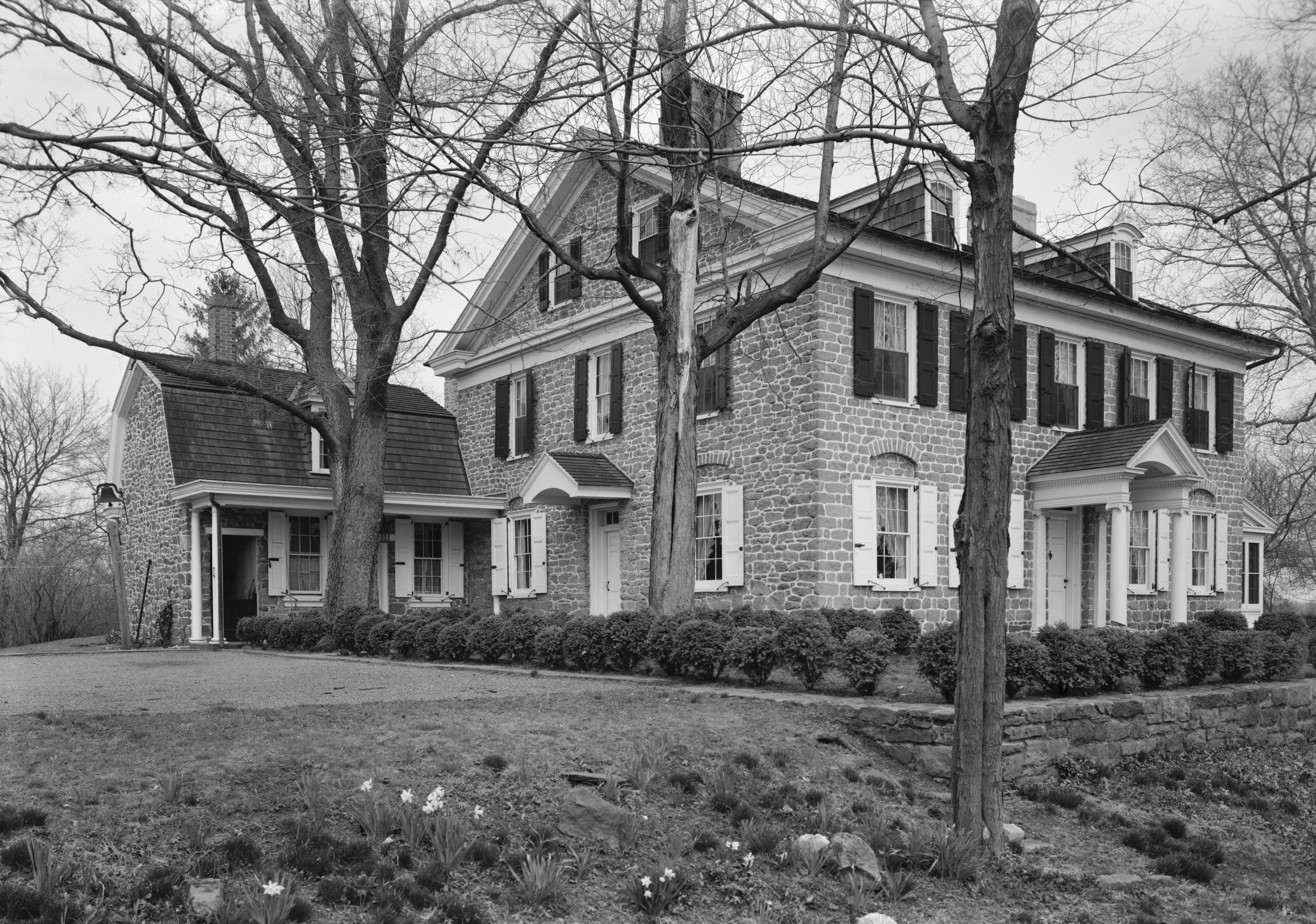
- Moore Hall, HABS Photo, April 1950

- Location within Pennsylvania Location within the United States
- Location: East of Phoenixville on Valley Forge Road, Schuylkill Township, Pennsylvania
- Coordinates: 40°7′22″N 75°29′42″W
- Area: 1.5 acres (0.61 ha)
- Built: 1730
- Architectural style: Georgian
- NRHP reference No.: 74001771
- Added to NRHP: November 19, 1974

Moore Hall, also known as the William Moore House, is an historic home that is located in Schuylkill Township, Chester County, Pennsylvania, United States.

It was listed on the National Register of Historic Places in 1974.

== History and architectural features ==
This house dates back to roughly 1722, and is a 2 1/2-story, five-bay by three-bay, fieldstone dwelling that was designed in the Georgian style. It has a gable roof, a two-story rear kitchen wing, and a sun porch, and was restored during the late-1930s. During the American Revolution, this house served as headquarters for Colonel Clement Biddle, in late-1777 and early-1778, during the encampment at Valley Forge. At that time, a committee of congress met at Moore Hall for three months and there decided that General George Washington should serve as Commander-in-Chief of the Continental Army. At the turn of the twentieth century, the house served as the summer home for Pennsylvania Governor Samuel W. Pennypacker.
