= Matthias Pennypacker Farm =

Historic house in Pennsylvania, United States

- U.S. National Register of Historic Places
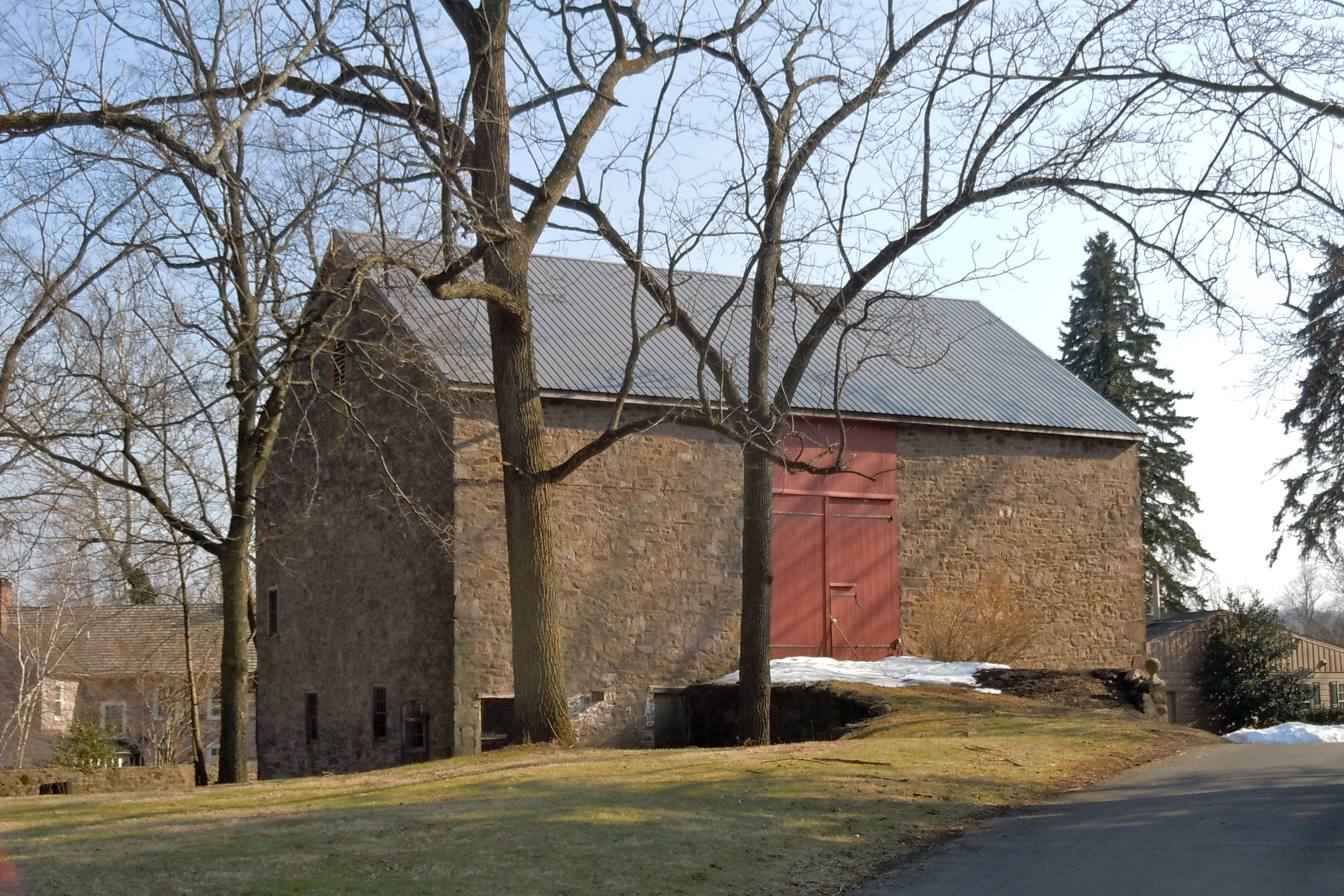
- Matthias Pennypacker Barn, February 2011

- Location within Pennsylvania Location within the United States
- Location: South of Phoenixville on White Horse Road, Schuylkill Township, Pennsylvania
- Coordinates: 40°6′38″N 75°30′27″W
- Area: 5.9 acres (2.4 ha)
- Built: 1775, 1830
- Architectural style: Georgian
- NRHP reference No.: 77001154
- Added to NRHP: December 27, 1977

The Matthias Pennypacker Farm, also known as the Tinker Dam Farm, is an historic farmhouse in Schuylkill Township, Chester County, Pennsylvania, United States.

It was listed on the National Register of Historic Places in 1977.

== History and architectural features ==
This historic structure consists of two sections in the shape of an "L" and s designed in the Georgian style. It is constructed of rubble masonry and has a slate gable roof. The older section pre-dates the American Revolution and is two stories and two bays wide. The main portion dates to 1830, and is three stories high and five bays wide. Also located on the property are a small stone smokehouse, spring house, root cellar, and large stone barn measuring forty feet by sixty feet, which dates to 1830.
