= Schuylkill Township, Chester County, Pennsylvania =

Township in Pennsylvania, US

Schuylkill Township
- Township
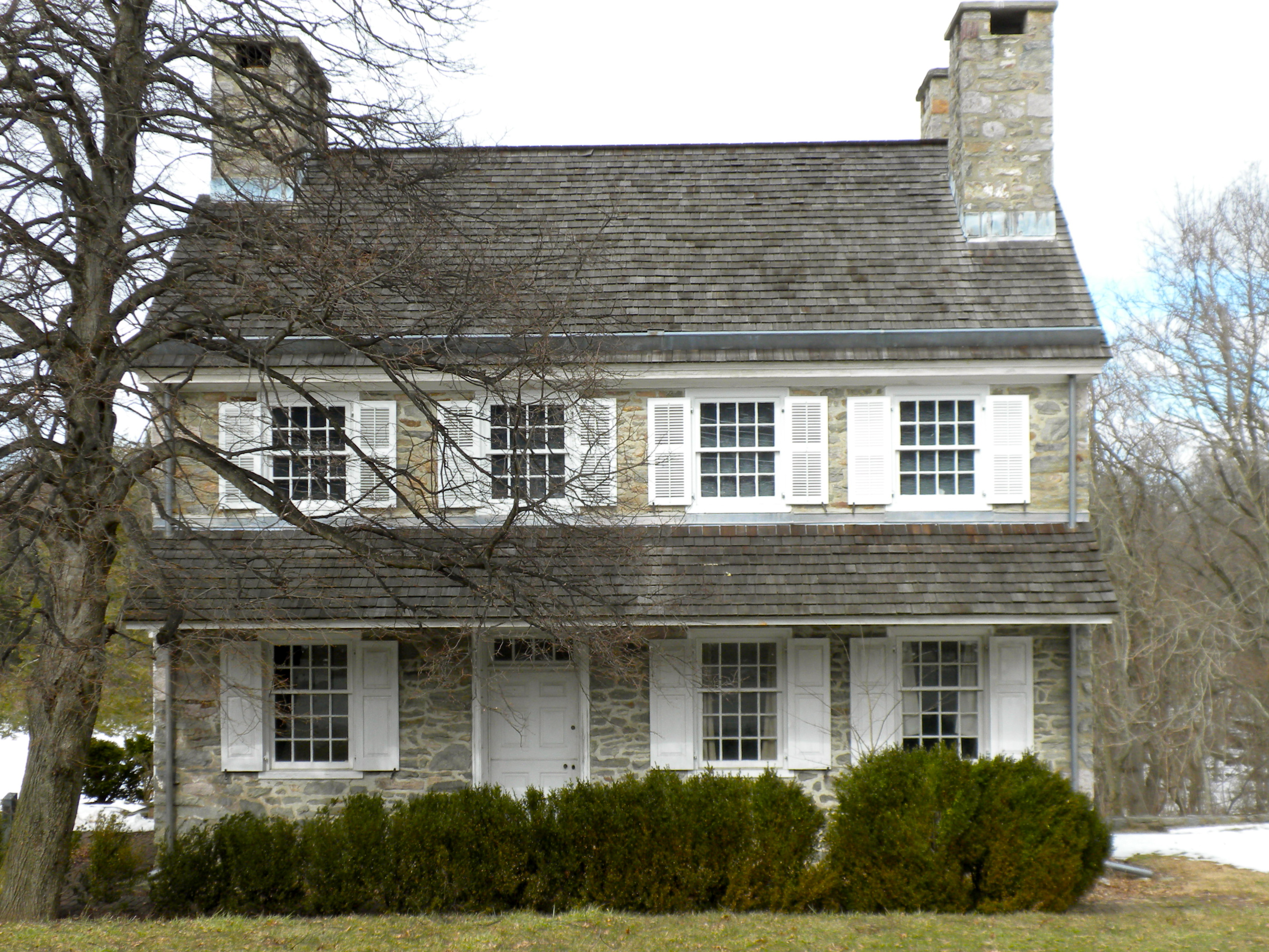
- Headquarters of General von Steuben at Valley Forge

- Location of Schuylkill Township in Chester County and of Chester County in Pennsylvania

- Location of Pennsylvania in the United States
- Coordinates: 40°06′41″N 75°30′34″W
- Country: United States
- State: Pennsylvania
- County: Chester

Area
  - Total: 8.91 sq mi (23.08 km^{2})
  - Land: 8.51 sq mi (22.04 km^{2})
  - Water: 0.41 sq mi (1.05 km^{2})
- Elevation: 138 ft (42 m)

Population (2010)
  - Total: 8,516
  - Estimate (2016): 8,571
  - Density: 1,007.4/sq mi (388.97/km^{2})
- Time zone: UTC-5 (EST)
  - Summer (DST): UTC-4 (EDT)
- Area code: 610
- FIPS code: 42-029-68288
- Website: https://schuylkilltwp.org

Schuylkill Township is a township in Chester County, Pennsylvania, United States. It contains the village of Valley Forge. The population was 8,516 at the 2010 census.

== History ==
The Moses Coates Jr. Farm, Gen. Frederick Von Steuben Headquarters, Moore Hall, Matthias Pennypacker Farm, and White Horse Farm are listed on the National Register of Historic Places.

== Geography ==
According to the United States Census Bureau, the township has a total area of 8.9 square miles (23.0 km^{2}), of which 8.6 square miles (22.2 km^{2}) is land and 0.3 square mile (0.8 km^{2}) (3.60%) is water.

== Demographics ==
Historical population
Census	Pop.	Note	%±
1930	1,566		—
1940	1,581		1.0%
1950	3,835		142.6%
1960	3,461		−9.8%
1970	5,779		67.0%
1980	5,993		3.7%
1990	5,538		−7.6%
2000	6,960		25.7%
2010	8,516		22.4%
2020	8,780		3.1%

At the 2010 census, the township was 89.7% non-Hispanic White, 2.1% Black or African American, 0.1% Native American, 4.0% Asian, and 1.5% were two or more races. 2.6% of the population were of Hispanic or Latino ancestry.

As of the census of 2000, there were 6,960 people, 2,536 households, and 1,975 families living in the township. The population density was 812.2 inhabitants per square mile (313.6/km^{2}). There were 2,652 housing units at an average density of 309.5 per square mile (119.5/km^{2}). The racial makeup of the township was 94.83% White, 1.67% African American, 0.07% Native American, 2.49% Asian, 0.03% Pacific Islander, 0.36% from other races, and 0.56% from two or more races. Hispanic or Latino of any race were 1.26% of the population.

There were 2,536 households, out of which 33.0% had children under the age of 18 living with them, 69.2% were married couples living together, 5.6% had a female householder with no husband present, and 22.1% were non-families. 18.1% of all households were made up of individuals, and 6.0% had someone living alone who was 65 years of age or older. The average household size was 2.62 and the average family size was 2.98.

In the township the population was spread out, with 23.4% under the age of 18, 6.3% from 18 to 24, 30.9% from 25 to 44, 27.1% from 45 to 64, and 12.4% who were 65 years of age or older. The median age was 39 years. For every 100 females there were 100.5 males. For every 100 females age 18 and over, there were 97.0 males.

The median income for a household in the township was $86,092, and the median income for a family was $97,032. Males had a median income of $68,370 versus $37,733 for females. The per capita income for the township was $43,379. About 1.9% of families and 3.5% of the population were below the poverty line, including 4.5% of those under age 18 and 4.4% of those age 65 or over.

== Education ==
=== Primary education ===
Phoenixville Area School District is the zoned school district of the township. There is an elementary school (Schuylkill Elementary) based in the township, but for secondary education, the students are transported to Phoenixville borough.

=== Colleges and universities ===
Part of the University of Valley Forge's campus, formerly the location of the Valley Forge General Hospital, is located in Schuylkill Township. The other part is located in Charlestown Township. The campus straddles the township line.

== Transportation ==
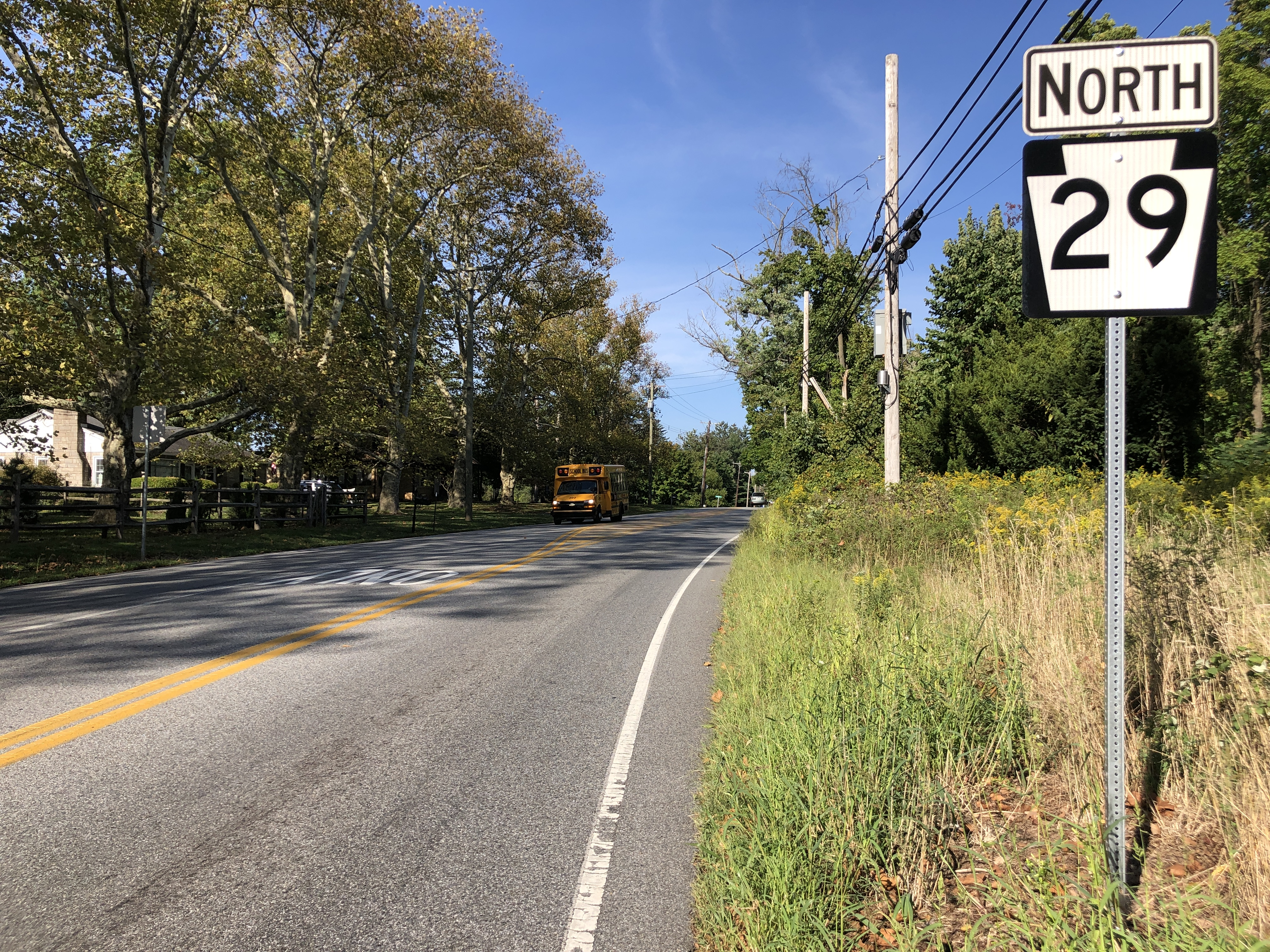
PA 29 northbound in Schuylkill Township

As of 2019, there were 56.79 miles (91.39 km) of public roads in Schuylkill Township, of which 15.60 miles (25.11 km) were maintained by the Pennsylvania Department of Transportation (PennDOT) and 41.19 miles (66.29 km) were maintained by the township.

Pennsylvania Route 23, Pennsylvania Route 29, and Pennsylvania Route 113 are the numbered roads serving Schuylkill Township. PA 23 follows Valley Forge Road and Schuylkill Road along a northwest–southeast alignment across the northern and eastern portions of the township. PA 29 follows West Chester State Road along a southwest-to-northeast alignment across the southwestern portion of the township. PA 113 follows Kimberton Road along a southwest–northeast alignment through the northwestern corner of the township.

== See also ==
- Valley Forge National Historical Park
