= List of Pennsylvania state historical markers in the Borough of West Chester =

This is a list of the Pennsylvania state historical markers in the Borough of West Chester, Pennsylvania

This is intended to be a complete list of the official state historical markers placed in West Chester, Pennsylvania, by the Pennsylvania Historical and Museum Commission (PHMC). The locations of the historical markers, the inscriptions, as well as the latitude and longitude coordinates are provided by the Pennsylvania Historical and Museum Commission.

== Historical markers ==
| Marker title | Image | Date dedicated | Location | Marker type | Description |
| Bayard Rustin | | February 16, 1995 | At the school, Lincoln & Montgomery Aves., West Chester | City | Born here, the civil rights leader and pacifist organized the 1963 March on Washington. Head of A. Philip Randolph Institute, 1966-1979. Elected to Henderson High School Hall of Fame. |
| Chester County | | October 26, 1982 | County Courthouse, N. High St., West Chester; 39.95997°N 75.60482°W | City | One of Pennsylvania's three original counties, formed 1682 by William Penn. Name derived from Cheshire in England. West Chester, the county seat since 1788, was incorporated in 1799. County was the scene of important military activities in 1777-1778. |
| Frederick Douglass (1818-1895) | | February 1, 2006 | West Chester Univ. campus, between Library and Main Hall, facing High St. 39.95235°N 75.59732°W | Roadside | Champion of human freedom, African American abolitionist, newspaper editor, U.S. Colored Troops recruiter, U.S. ambassador to Haiti, and orator, Frederick Douglass gave his last public address "Against Lynch Law" here on February 1, 1895. A frequent visitor to West Chester, Douglass denounced lynching and bigotry and urged freedom, justice, and equality for all Americans. The Frederick Douglass Institute here maintains Douglass' legacy. |
| G. Raymond Rettew | | September 17, 2002 | Walnut & Chestnut Streets, West Chester; 39.96182°N 75.60485°W | Roadside | A West Chester chemist, he pioneered the mass production of penicillin, the world's first antibiotic. In 1943, with Wyeth Laboratories, his lab ( a converted auto repair shop here) made & sent more penicillin to the Armed Forces than any other lab in the world, saving countless lives on the battlefields of World War II. |
| Great Minquas Path | | June 26, 1951 | Business U.S. 322, 1 mile SE of West Chester; 39.9483°N 75.5938°W | Roadside | An important Indian trail, key to Pennsylvania's fur trade in the 17th century, crossed the present highway near here. It linked trading posts on the lower Schuylkill with Indian towns to the west. The Dutch, Swedes, and English fought one another for control of path. |
| Great Trail (The) - Minquas or Susquehanna Indians- PLAQUE | | November 14, 1925 | US 202 & 322, at Church Ave., 1/2 mile S of West Chester; 39.9483°N 75.5938°W | Plaque | From the Susquehanna to the Schuylkill. Crossed the present road about this point. It was the path prior to 1670 for their conquest of the Lenni-Lenape or Delaware Indians and for trade with the first Dutch and Swedish settlers on the Delaware River... |
| Horace Pippin | | June 9, 1979 | 327 Gay St., West Chester; 39.9583°N 75.61037°W | City | Born in West Chester in 1888, Pippin occupied this house from 1920 until his death in 1946. A self-taught black artist, he painted while living here such notable works as "Domino Players," "John Brown Going to His Hanging," and the "Holy Mountain" series. |
| Joseph T. Rothrock | | June 9, 1952 | NW corner, N. Church St. & W. Lafayette St., West Chester; 39.9635°N 75.60922°W | City | Conservationist, father of the State Forest idea in Pennsylvania, lived in this house from 1876 until his death in 1922. He pioneered in the development of forest fire control, reforestation, and scientific forestry. |
| Lincoln Biography | | September 17, 1952 | 28 W. Market St., West Chester; 39.95928°N 75.60515°W | City | The first published biography of Abraham Lincoln was printed in this building on Feb.11, 1860. It was prepared from Lincoln's own notes and served to introduce him to the public as a potential presidential candidate. |
| Samuel Barber | | March 9, 1996 | 107 S. Church St., West Chester; 39.57833°N 75.6045°W | City | Boyhood home of this composer of orchestral and vocal works, including the "Adagio for Strings" and "Knoxville: Summer of 1915." Won Pulitzer Prizes in music, 1958 & 1963. Graduate, Curtis Institute. He wrote West Chester High's Alma Mater song. |
| Star of the West (Tent#6) | | May 15, 1995 | 113 S Adams St., West Chester; 39.96137°N 75.59757°W | City | An African American women's community service organization, chartered 1865. A part of the United Order of Tents, J. R. Giddings and Jollifee Union, founded in 1847 and named for abolitionist Congressman Giddings and his law partner. |
| William Darlington | | April 11, 1952 | 13 N. High St. between Market & Gay Sts., West Chester; 39.96013°N 75.60477°W | City | Physician, Congressman, began a service of 33 years as president of Bank of Chester County in this building, 1830. Especially noted for his many contributions to the science and study of botany in the early 1800s. He died in 1863. |
| Woman's Rights Convention of 1852 | | October 13, 2003 | 225 N. High St., West Chester; 39.96203°N 75.6066°W | City | The first Woman’s Rights Convention in Pennsylvania was held here, June 2–3, 1852, four years after the famous Seneca Falls, New York, Convention. It adopted resolutions promoting the legal, educational, and vocational rights of women. |
