= National Register of Historic Places listings in Chester County, Pennsylvania =

Location of Chester County in Pennsylvania

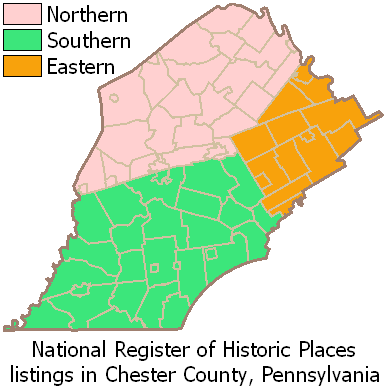
Map of Chester County (clickable)

There are 322 properties and districts listed on the National Register in Chester County, Pennsylvania, United States.

This National Park Service list is complete through NPS recent listings posted July 31, 2026.

== Number of listings by region ==
For the purposes of this list, the county is split into three regions: Eastern, Northern, and Southern. Eastern Chester County is defined as being the municipalities south and east of a line extending from Phoenixville to Exton to West Chester; Northern Chester County is defined as being the municipalities north of the Philadelphia Main Line and west of a line extending from Phoenixville to Exton; and Southern Chester County is defined as being the municipalities south of the Philadelphia Main Line and west of West Chester. One district is split between Northern and Eastern Chester County.

| | Region | # of Sites |
|---|---|---|
| 1 | Eastern | 113 |
| 2 | Northern | 90 |
| 3 | Southern | 123 |
| (Duplicates): | | (1) |
| Total: | | 325 |

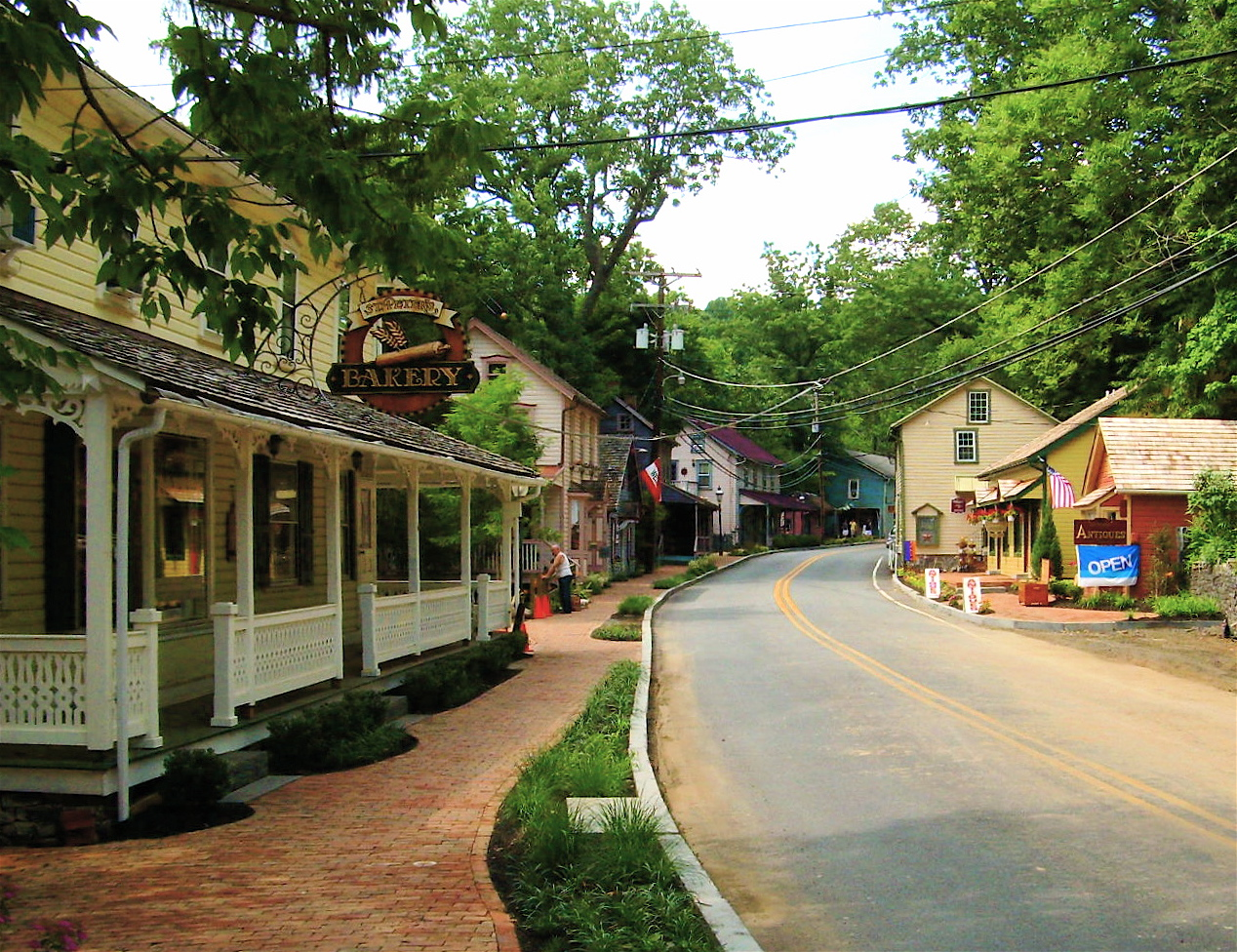
St. Peters Village Historic District, Northern

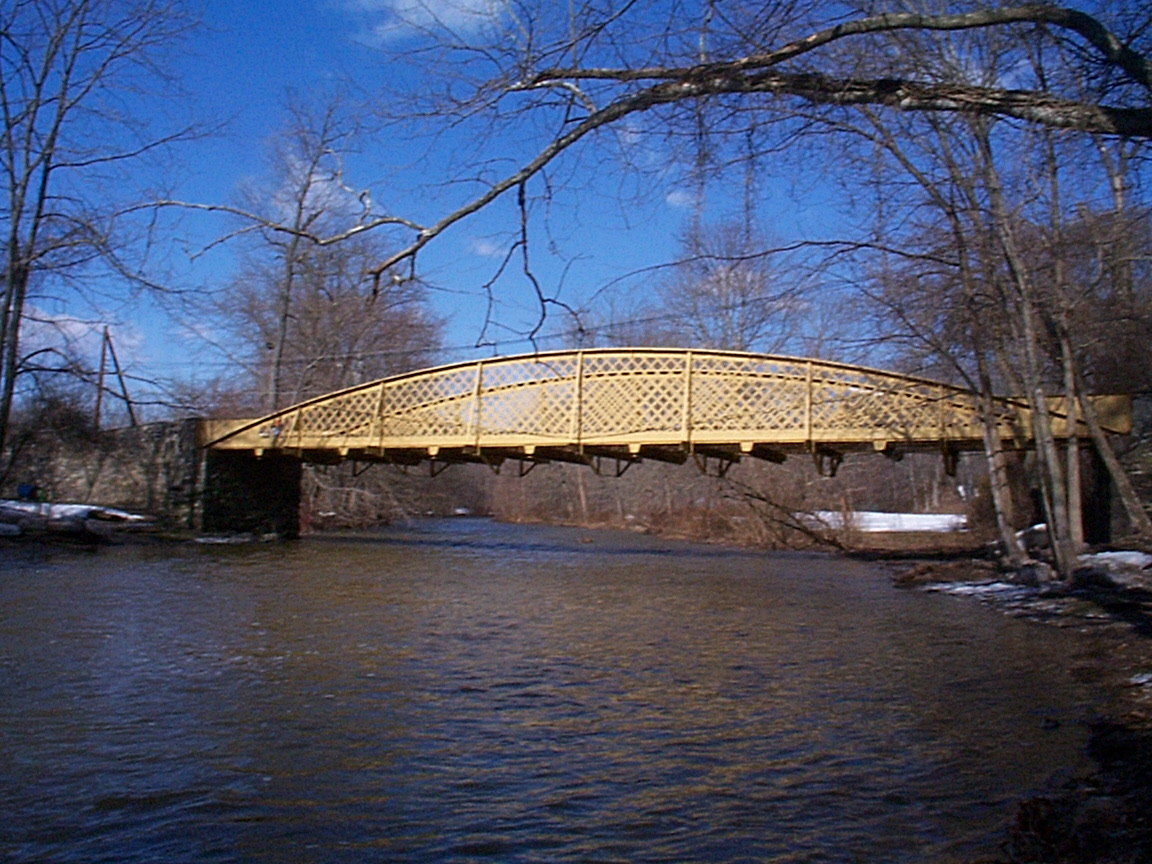
Hares Hill Road Bridge, Northern

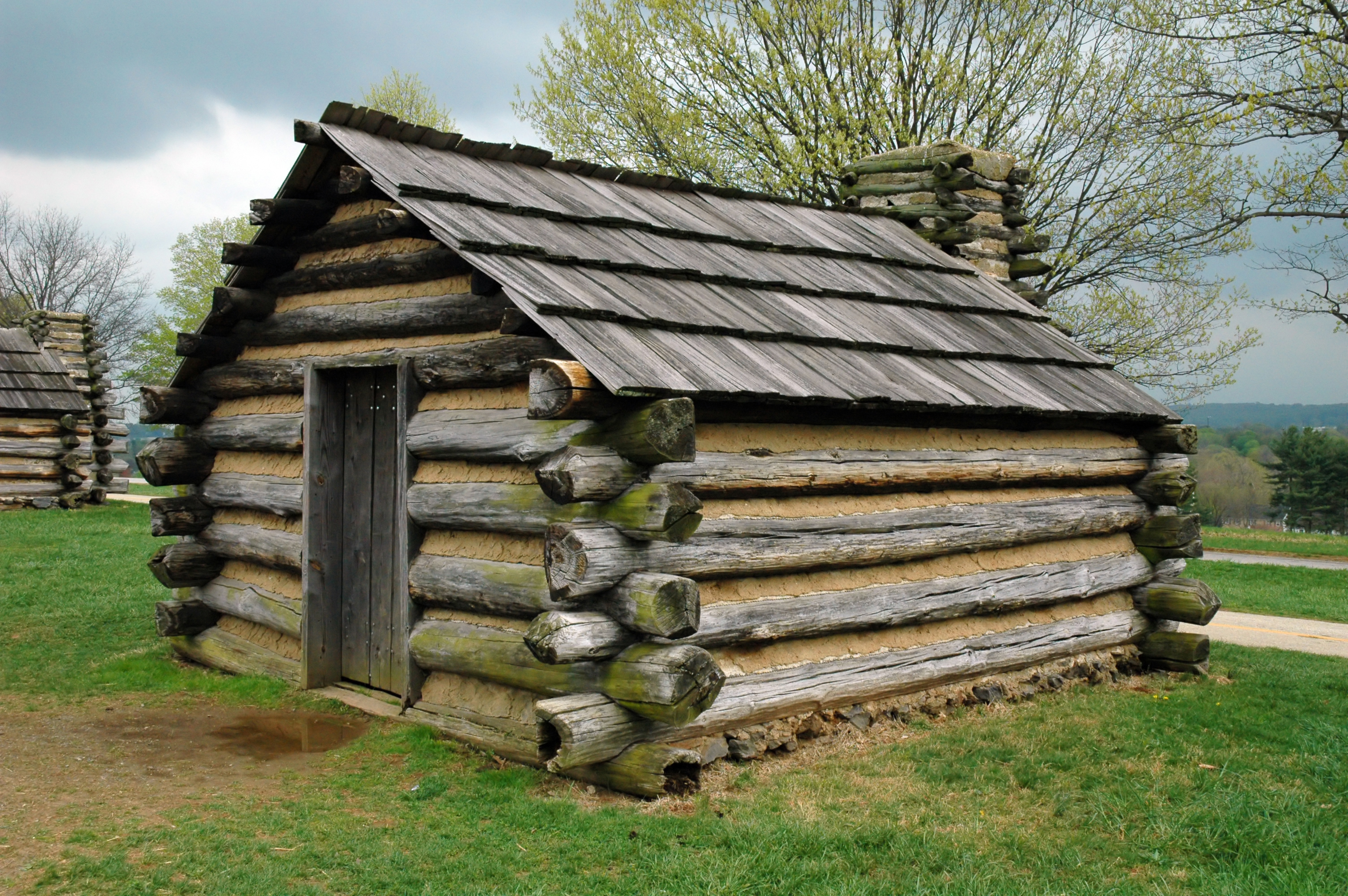
Valley Forge National Historical Park, Eastern

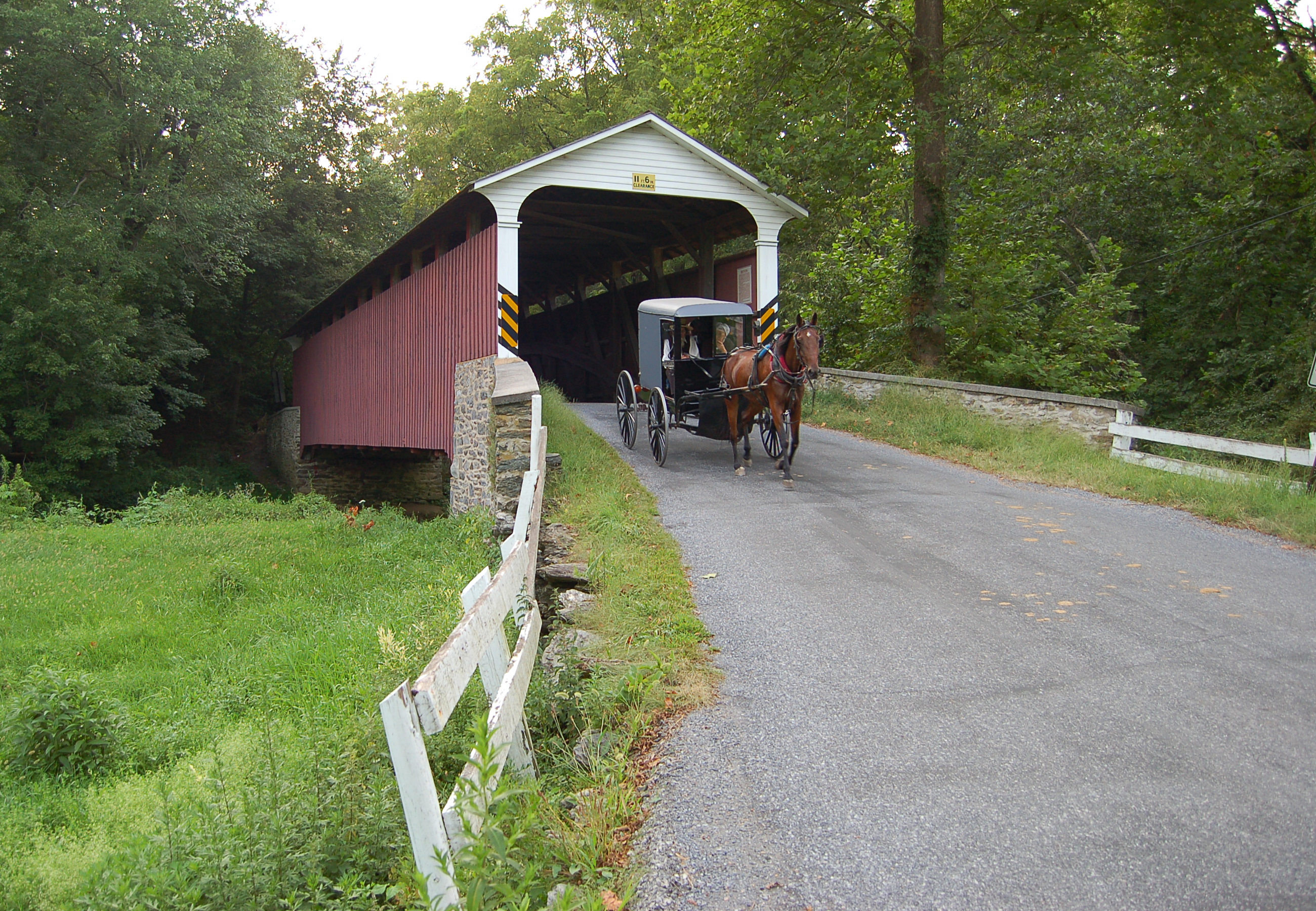
Mercer's Mill Covered Bridge, Southern

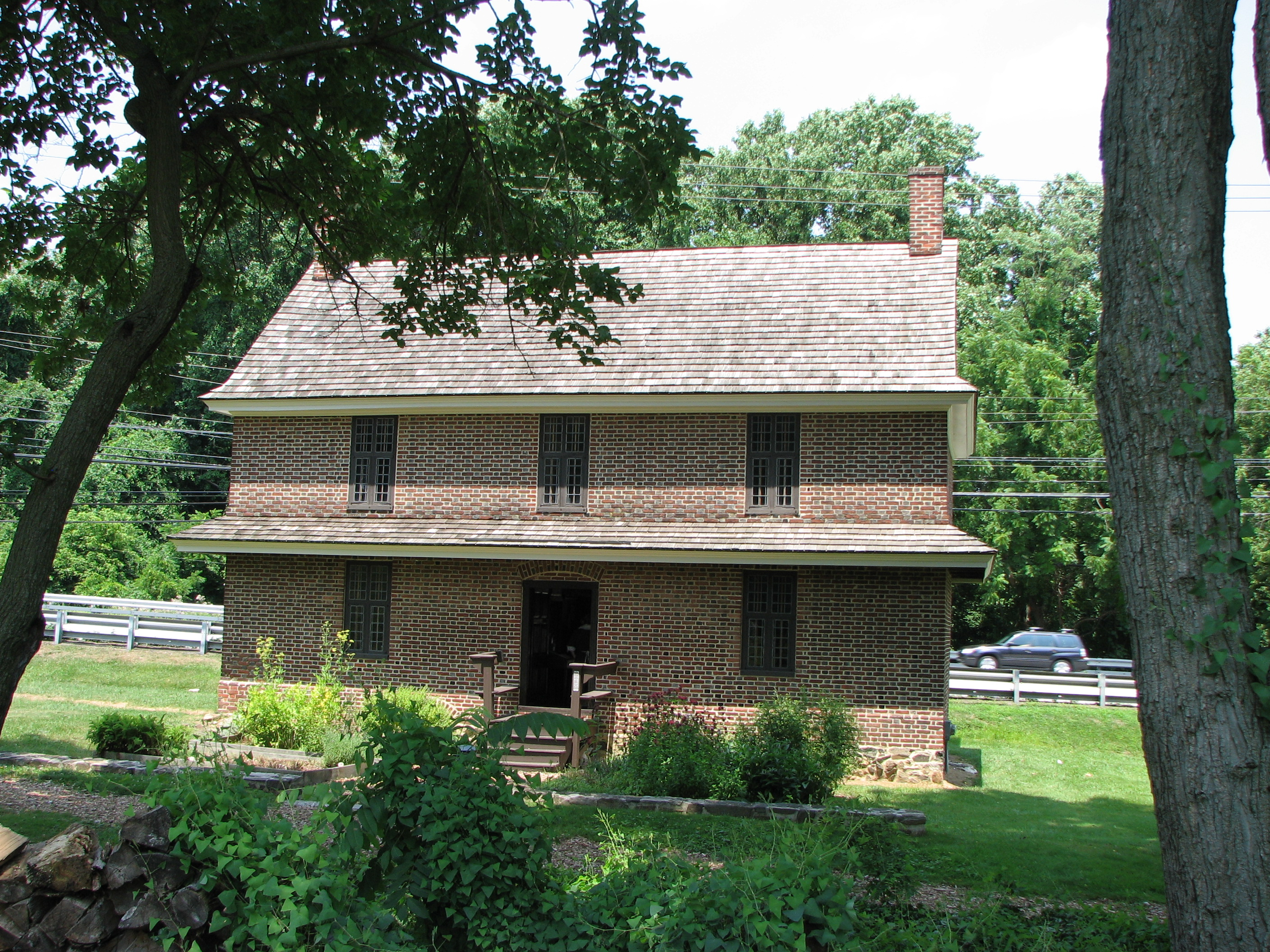
Barns-Brinton House, Southern

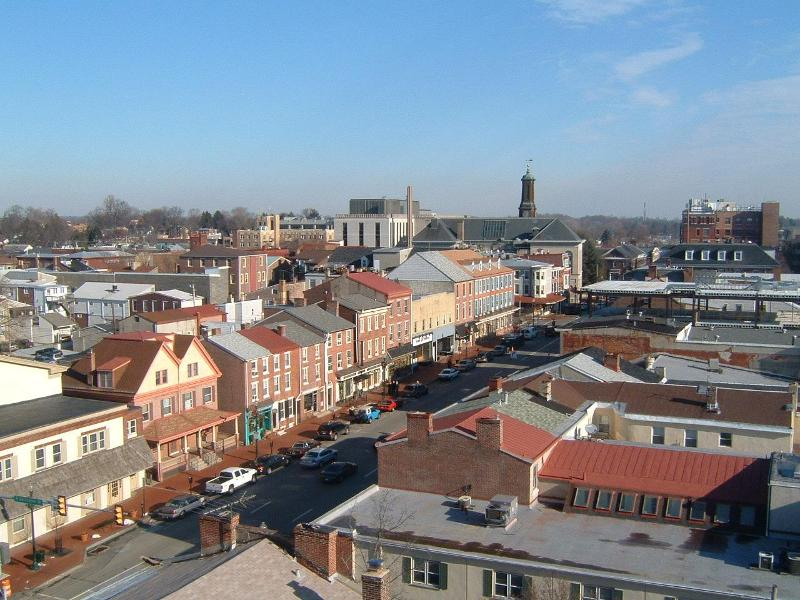
West Chester Downtown Historic District, Eastern

== See also ==
- List of Pennsylvania state historical markers in Chester County
