= Berwyn School Fight =

1930s efforts to desegregate Pennsylvania public schools

- Part of Civil rights movement (1896–1954)
- Date: 1932–1934
- Duration: 2 years
- Location: Tredyffrin and Easttown Townships, Pennsylvania, United States
- Type: Boycott

The Berwyn School Fight was a 1930s fight against school segregation in the southeastern Pennsylvania townships of Tredyffrin and Easttown. In 1932, local school districts attempted to segregate elementary schools by race. Black parents sued to stop the segregationists and withdrew their children from school until the school districts finally conceded defeat in 1934. Occurring 20 years before Brown v. Board of Education (1954) declared school segregation to be unconstitutional nationwide, the Berwyn School Fight was an early victory for the civil rights movement and an important moment in Chester County history.

== Attempted segregation ==
By the early 1930s, Tredyffrin and Easttown were home to a small, working-class African American community. "Colored schools" were widespread in early 20th-century Pennsylvania, but many elementary schools in Chester County at the time were open to all students regardless of race or color. Each of the towns' grammar schools held classes for grades 1–8, and all high school students attended the consolidated Tredyffrin Easttown High School.

In March 1932, the Tredyffrin and Easttown school boards announced a joint agreement to establish a new grammar school exclusively for the districts' Black students in grades 1–8. The school boards planned to put the new "colored school" in a 20-year-old district-owned building in Berwyn, adjacent to the noisy Lincoln Highway. All Black schoolchildren from both townships would be shifted to this school, or to the smaller and similarly segregated Mount Pleasant School at the far eastern end of Tredyffrin. Only Black teachers and staff would be permitted to work at these schools. Meanwhile, the Tredyffrin School District would move its white students to the brand-new, all-white Easttown Elementary School, built with $250,000 of local tax revenue.

The president of the Tredyffrin School Board, Norman Joy Greene, argued that racial segregation would foster economic growth: "The growth of the two townships has been retarded by the fact that we mix the colored and the white in our schools. Prospective home owners will undoubtedly be attracted to the communities, and real estate values should be very much improved." He also claimed that segregated schools would benefit Black students: "The change will give the colored of the district a fine school with the finest colored teachers, and the best equipment that can be procured."

== Black resistance ==
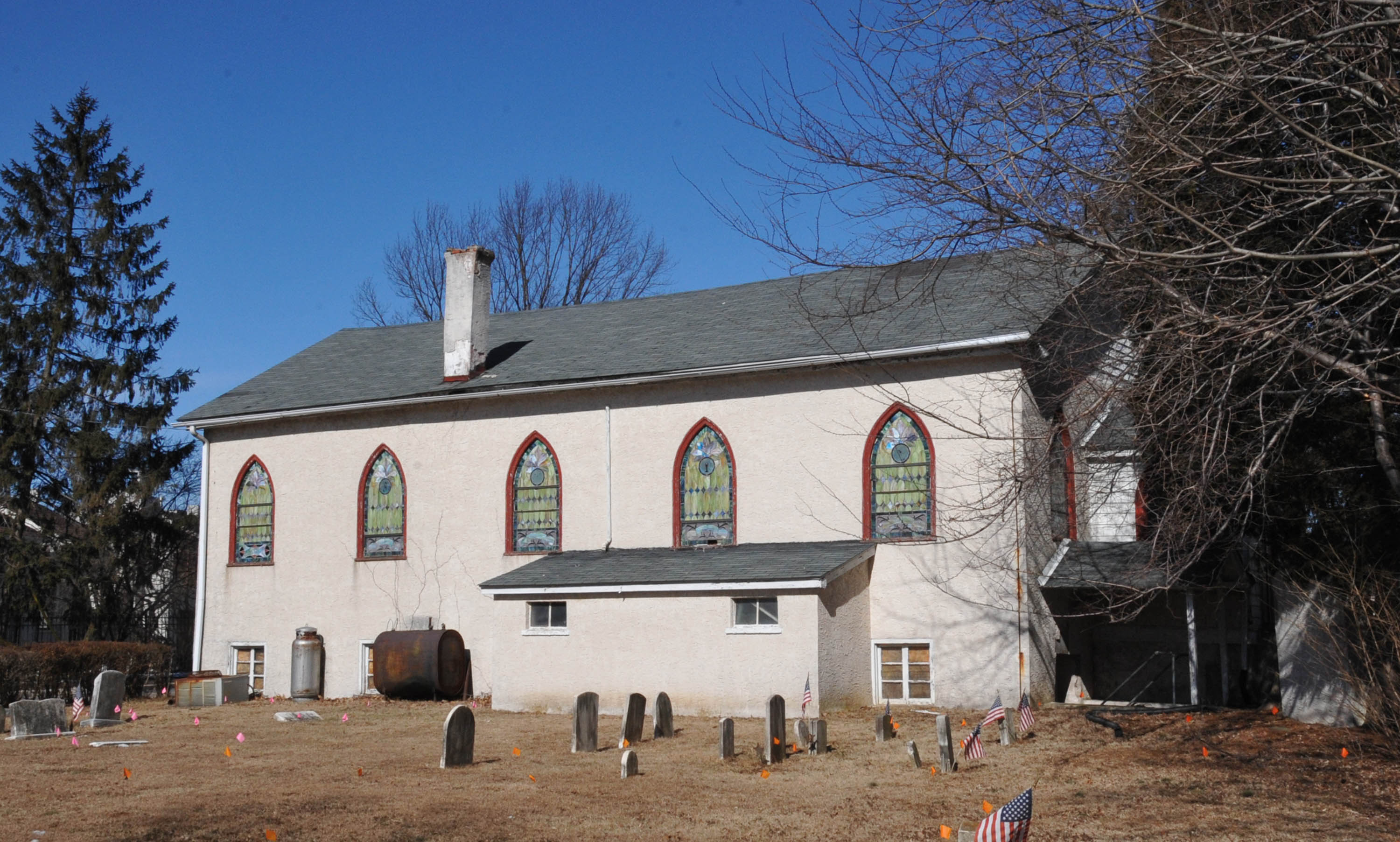
Mount Zion AME Church in Tredyffrin Township

The Black communities of Tredyffrin and Easttown expressed outrage at this attempt to introduce segregated schools. On March 16, 1932, hundreds of Black and some white residents attended a mass meeting to protest the school boards' decision. The community presented a petition to the Easttown School Board, proclaiming that the decision to introduce segregated schools "tends not toward the betterment and benefit of the conditions surrounding the negro school children, but rather toward the degradation and segregation." In June 1932, Black parents met at the Mount Zion A.M.E. Church and vowed to boycott the schools until the districts reversed their decision. The Bryn Mawr chapter of the NAACP filed a lawsuit against the school boards, and Black attorney Raymond Pace Alexander agreed to represent the plaintiffs on a pro bono basis. Black parents tried to enroll their children in the new school, but district officials turned them away. Starting in June 1932, 212 African American schoolchildren boycotted the schools, staying home or receiving private schooling.

Siding with the school boards, Pennsylvania Attorney General William A. Schnader refused to support Alexander's lawsuit, leading to trial postponements and mounting legal costs for the plaintiffs. By September 1933, as the boycott continued unabated, more radical groups such as the International Labor Defense, the American Civil Liberties Union, and the Education Equality League stepped up to support the boycott movement, establishing a Joint Action Committee, which the NAACP's Bryn Mawr chapter joined and later quit due to the NAACP's reluctance to associate with Communist-linked groups.

In October 1933, Attorney General Schnader ordered the arrest of parents who continued to refuse to send their children to school. Four parents rejected bail and served their six-day jail sentences in protest. The NAACP paid the other parents' fines. Then a Black woman, surnamed Williams, went to jail with her baby so that her husband could keep working to support their family. Confounded by her stand, officials stopped arresting parents.

In February 1934, the Joint Action Committee planned a mass rally in Philadelphia, declaring March 11, 1934, as "Berwyn School Segregation Protest Day." The Philadelphia Tribune projected turnout at 5,000 or more people. Organizers canceled the march after police denied the protest a permit.

== Reintegration ==
In March 1934, needing Black voters to support his gubernatorial campaign, Schnader finally promised Alexander to back the desegregation lawsuit. In April, Schnader duly added his name to the suit, and his deputy attorneys negotiated an out-of-court settlement on May 1, 1934. Under the settlement's terms, Tredyffrin's and Easttown's schools reintegrated, 225 Black students returned to school, and the two-year boycott ended. Unfortunately, many of the Black students, whose working-class parents could not afford private tutors during the boycott, had fallen behind academically and had to repeat one or two grades. Interviewed decades later, some of these students recalled dropping out of school in the face of taunts from their white peers.

== Legacy ==
In 1935, the Pennsylvania General Assembly enacted the Pennsylvania Equal Rights Act, banning racial discrimination in all public accommodations and jailing or fining violators. The Democratic-controlled House and Senate passed the bill in May 1935, and George Earle, a Democrat who had defeated Schnader, a Republican, in the governor's race months earlier, signed the measure into law in June 1935. The Act went into effect on September 1.

In November 2020, a Pennsylvania state historical marker commemorating the Berwyn School Fight was installed at the Mount Zion A.M.E. Church in Tredyffrin, a meeting place of the boycott movement. Mount Zion had been listed on the National Register of Historic Places on January 27, 2015.

The Tredyffrin/Easttown School District added the Berwyn School Fight to its third, eighth, and tenth grade social studies curricula in 2023.
