= Whiteland =

Whiteland may refer to one of several places:

United States

- Whiteland, Indiana
  - Whiteland Community High School
- New Whiteland, Indiana
- East Whiteland Township, Pennsylvania
- West Whiteland Township, Pennsylvania
  - West Whiteland Inn, in West Whiteland Township

Trinidad and Tobago

- Whiteland, Trinidad and Tobago

== See also ==
- Whiteland
- The Three Princesses of Whiteland, fairy tale
- Eugène Terre'Blanche
- Whitelands College, one of the four constituent colleges of the University of Roehampton, London, England
