= N99 =

N99 or N-99 may refer to:

- Brandywine Airport, in West Goshen Township, Pennsylvania, United States; formerly assigned FAA LID N99
- HMS Upholder (N99), a submarine of the Royal Navy
- N99 motorway (Netherlands)
- Nebraska Highway 99, in the United States
- NIOSH N99, a rating for respirators and surgical masks
- NR-N99 tank droid, a fictional vehicle in the Star Wars universe
