= Ches-Mont League =

High school sports league

The Ches-Mont League is a high school sports league primarily located in Chester County, Pennsylvania in the suburbs of Philadelphia. Currently, the league consists of thirteen high schools, divided into two divisions. Twelve of the schools are from Chester County, with one from Delaware County.

The schools all compete in varsity high school sports in the Pennsylvania Interscholastic Athletic Association (PIAA). Ches-Mont League teams compete in District One, at the AAAA, AAA and AA levels.

== Schools ==
=== National Division ===
- Avon Grove High School (West Grove)
- Bishop Shanahan High School (Downingtown)
- Coatesville Area High School (Coatesville)
- Downingtown East High School (Lionville)
- Downingtown West High School (Downingtown)
- B. Reed Henderson High School (West Chester)
- West Chester East High School (West Chester)

=== American Division ===
- Great Valley High School (Malvern)
- Kennett High School (Kennett Square)
- Oxford Area High School (Oxford)
- Bayard Rustin High School (West Chester)
- Sun Valley High School (Aston)
- Unionville High School (Kennett Square)

== History ==
The Ches-Mont League started in 1950 as a spin-off from the huge Suburban League, which had been home for the larger schools in Chester County for some time. All of the new league's charter members either were in Chester County or in Montgomery County municipalities bordering the Schuylkill River, thus the "Ches-Mont" name. Eight schools originally comprised the league, only one of which, Coatesville, is still part of the league today, though two other original members have split into smaller high schools (Downingtown and West Chester). The other five charter members were Bridgeport, which closed in 1966; Phoenixville; Pottstown; Spring City, which later merged with Royersford High School and became Spring-Ford; and Tredyffrin-Easttown, which later became Conestoga.

By 1960, the Ches-Mont had grown to 10 members by dropping smaller schools and adding newly consolidated high schools that had become too large for the small-school Inter-County League. In 1968, Conestoga joined nine former Suburban League schools in the new Central League. During the 1970s, West Chester opened a second high school; also, the league accepted its first non-public school member, St. Pius X of Pottstown, so that by the end of the decade, the Ches-Mont League had an unwieldy 12 schools playing in only one division.

By the middle of the 1980s, the great disparity in size between the largest and smallest schools became much more pronounced with the growth of classification-based postseason play. The Ches-Mont League could not agree on how to create relief for the situation, so the smaller, more rural, schools took matters into their own hands. In the fall of 1985, five Ches-Mont schools, including charter members Phoenixville and Pottstown, announced that they were joining with two smaller Bux-Mont League schools and Lansdale Catholic of the Bicentennial Athletic League to form the new Pioneer Athletic Conference, which started league play in 1986.

For two years, the Ches-Mont was a seven-team league. But at the end of the 1988 scholastic year, two more schools left for the Pioneer Conference and a third, Boyertown, decided to make one of its periodic moves to District 3. This reduced the Ches-Mont League, which from 1978 through 1982 was the largest primarily public-school sports league in the southeastern Pennsylvania suburbs of Philadelphia, to only four schools - Coatesville, Downingtown, West Chester East, and West Chester Henderson.

Fearing that it could not operate as a four-team league, the remaining Ches-Mont schools applied for membership in the Central League, but they were rebuffed. The PIAA tried to force the Central League to add the teams, but the Central League sued and won. Thanks to the ruling in this suit, the PIAA has no power to re-align sports leagues. Only the leagues themselves can do so. (High school federations in many other states can re-shape sports leagues at will.)

For 15 years, the Ches-Mont League remained an association of four schools. It managed to find ways of coping with its small size through creative scheduling - for example, in football, each school played the others twice in the regular season. In other sports, the schools traveled far and wide, often scheduling opponents in other parts of Pennsylvania and even from other states, which at the time was highly unusual for schools not on the state border.

Population growth in formerly rural parts of Chester County soon helped the remaining Ches-Mont schools. The splitting of Downingtown into two high schools and the opening of a new, larger Bishop Shanahan High School, which now was much larger than the rural schools that still dominated the Southern Chester County League, allowed the Ches-Mont to grow to six schools in 2003.

In 2007, just after the creation of Bayard Rustin, the third West Chester high school, Avon Grove was offered admission to the league. However, the league voted against a measure to offer admittance to other Southern Chester County League teams. West Chester Area School District superintendent Alan Elko sent a letter to the league stating that if the league did not "reconsider" its decision, the three West Chester schools would leave the league for the SCCL. After a few meetings, the league decided to offer admittance to Great Valley, Kennett, Octorara, Oxford, and Unionville from the SCCL. When those schools accepted, the SCCL disbanded. Sun Valley, of the Del-Val League, was also offered admittance, forming the fourteen team league.

Octorara High School left the Ches-Mont League to move to Lancaster-Lebanon League in 2018. The Ches-Mont League is currently a thirteen school league.
