= West Chester East High School =

Location
- West Chester, Pennsylvania; United States; 39.9801°N 75.5657°W

Information
- Type: High School
- Established: 1973
- Principal: Sarah Graham
- Staff: 84.06 (FTE)
- Grades: 9-12
- Enrollment: 1,234 (2019-20)
- Student to teacher ratio: 14.68
- Colors: Red, yellow and black
- Athletics: Pennsylvania Interscholastic Athletic Association
- Nickname: Vikings
- Website: Official Website

West Chester East High School (colloquially referred to simply as East or WC East) is a public four-year high school located in West Goshen Township, Pennsylvania, United States, near West Chester.

Established in 1973 as the second high school in the West Chester Area School District (along with Henderson High School), East is one of three high schools currently operating in the West Chester area (the third being Rustin High School, which opened in 2006). Newsweek ranked East 420 out of the top 1,000 high schools in America in 2015. East also earned a rank of 36 in Philadelphia Magazine's overview of the best 100 public schools in the Philadelphia area in 2012.

In the 2019-2020 school year, West Chester East had a student body of 1234 students. Students who attend J.R. Fugett Middle School attend East. West Chester East (as well as Fugett) draws its student body from East Goshen Elementary, Exton Elementary, Glen Acres Elementary, Fern Hill Elementary, and half a part of Greystone Elementary.

Communities served by West Chester East include sections of West Goshen Township, West Chester borough, East Goshen Township, West Whiteland Township, and Westtown Township. West Chester East serves about half of the Exton census-designated place, entirely in West Whiteland Township.

East's athletic teams compete as the Vikings in the Ches-Mont League, a District One affiliate of the Pennsylvania Interscholastic Athletic Association.

== Location ==
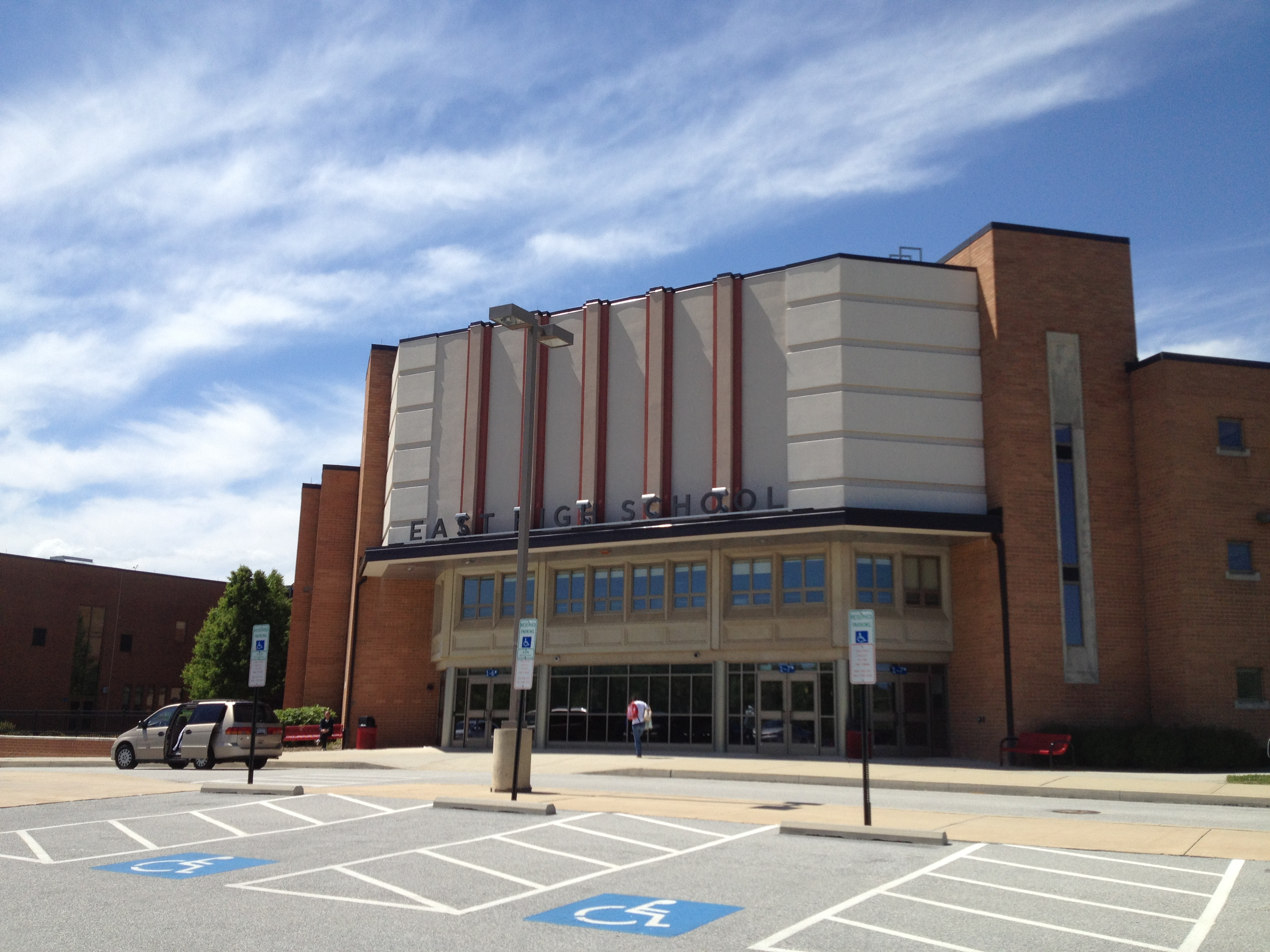
East High School

West Chester East High School is located at the corner of Ellis Lane and Paoli Pike, on the border of West Goshen Township and East Goshen Township, just east of the borough of West Chester, Pennsylvania. The building itself (which is connected directly to Fugett Middle School) is located in West Goshen, as are the school's numerous athletic fields, which include the football Stadium. The baseball and softball fields compete across Ellis Lane on Price Fields at West Chester East, located in East Goshen Township, which were constructed in 2003.

== History ==
With the opening of East High School, the district began splitting the student's population with B. Reed Henderson High School located in the borough. All students from Fugett and some students from Stetson Middle School would attend W.C. East until 2006, with the opening of Rustin High School.

The district began a large renovation project in the 1990s, with East's project beginning in 2003 and ending in 2006. This included renovations to the existing building and athletic fields, as well as construction of new baseball fields, a new science wing for the school, and a new basketball gymnasium.

== Extracurricular activities ==
Among East's extracurricular offerings, athletics is the most popular. West Chester East, along with Henderson and Rustin, competes in the Ches-Mont League, a fourteen high school sports league primarily located in Chester County.

The school's Theatre Company is also quite popular. They begin the year with a fall play, present a musical in late February, and a student written and directed One Act Festival in the spring. They also participate in the Critics and Awards Program for High School Students (Cappies), in which the critic team has been nominated as well as many others in the fields of performance and technical theatre.

East has also had great success in other activities. The Norse Code is the official newspaper club where many students publish news both online and in print. However, the largest group in school is the international business competition DECA, which boasts five international prizewinners in 2006, 2008, 2021, and 2023, as well as state leaders including the state president from 2007 to 2009 and 2020 to 2021. East DECA maintains the largest chapter in Pennsylvania. East has also had success with its Academic Team which has won 1st at the Pennsylvania State Academic Competition in 1996 and 2024 and been to nationals for the past sixteen years.

Beginning competition in the American Computer Science League in 2009, the school's programming team earned 3rd place in their division in the 09–10 season.

== Demographics ==
Race/Ethnicity as of 2019–2020
Groups	Number of Students	Percentage
Total	1,234	100%
White	941	76.26%
Hispanic	115	9.32%
Asian	96	7.78%
Black	66	5.35%
Two or More Races	13	1.05%
American Indian/Alaska Native	3	0.24%
Native Hawaiian/Pacific Islander	0	0.00%

Gender as of 2019–2020
Group	Number of Students	Percentage
Total	1,234	100%
Male	674	54.62%
Female	560	45.38%

== Notable alumni ==
- Drew Parsons (musician), bassist, restaurateur, coder
- Ryan Dunn, television personality, stunt performer, actor
- Bam Margera, actor, skateboarder, and reality show personality (attended but did not graduate)
- Brandon DiCamillo, actor, comedian and reality show personality
- Jess Margera, drummer of the bands CKY, Viking Skull, The Company Band and Gnarkill
- Deron Miller, musician, singer/guitarist for the bands CKY, World Under Blood and 96 Bitter Beings
- Chris Raab, actor and reality show personality
- Rake Yohn, actor and chemist.
- Matt Schaub, NFL quarterback
- Kyle Gallner, actor, best known for Veronica Mars, The Haunting in Connecticut, A Nightmare on Elm Street (2010 film) and Smile.
- Josh Grigsby, drummer for Houston Calls and Mae
- Graham Rogers, actor
- Jeanne VanBriesen, civil engineer and academic
- Andrew Carr (basketball), NBA Forward
