= Bayard Rustin High School =

Bayard Rustin High School may refer to:

- West Chester Rustin High School, Pennsylvania
- Bayard Rustin High School for the Humanities, New York City
