= East Goshen Township, Pennsylvania =

Township in Pennsylvania, US

East Goshen Township
- Township
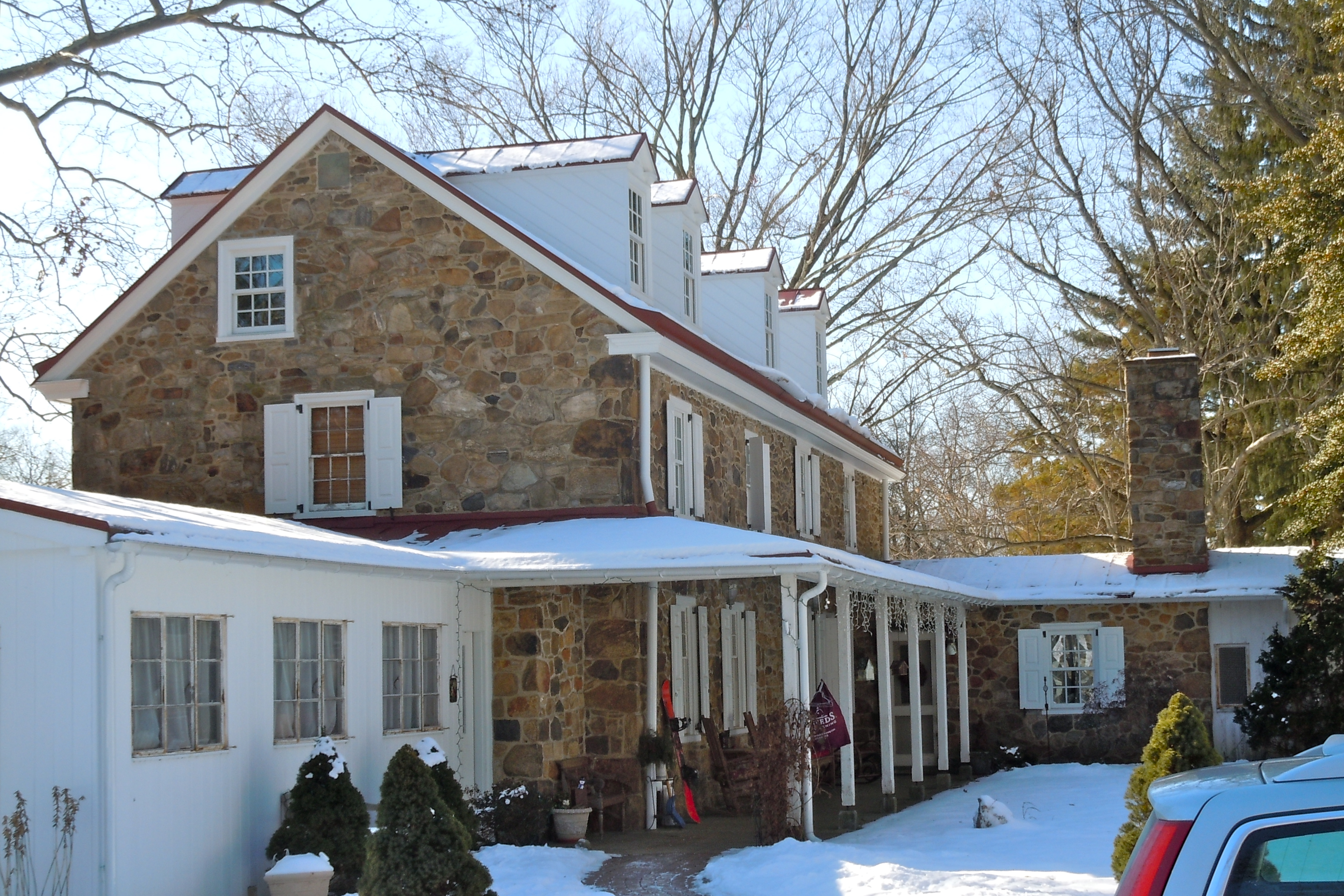
- Goodwin Acres, built 1736

- Seal

- Location of East Goshen Township in Chester County, Pennsylvania (top) and of Chester County in Pennsylvania (below)

- Location of Pennsylvania in the United States
- Coordinates: 39°59′07″N 75°32′53″W
- Country: United States
- State: Pennsylvania
- County: Chester
- Incorporated: 1817

Area
  - Total: 10.16 sq mi (26.32 km^{2})
  - Land: 10.05 sq mi (26.02 km^{2})
  - Water: 0.12 sq mi (0.30 km^{2})
- Elevation: 430 ft (130 m)

Population (2020)
  - Total: 18,421
  - Estimate (2023): 18,338
  - Density: 1,818.0/sq mi (701.95/km^{2})
- Time zone: UTC-5 (EST)
  - Summer (DST): UTC-4 (EDT)
- Area code: 610
- FIPS code: 42-029-21192
- Website: www.eastgoshen.org

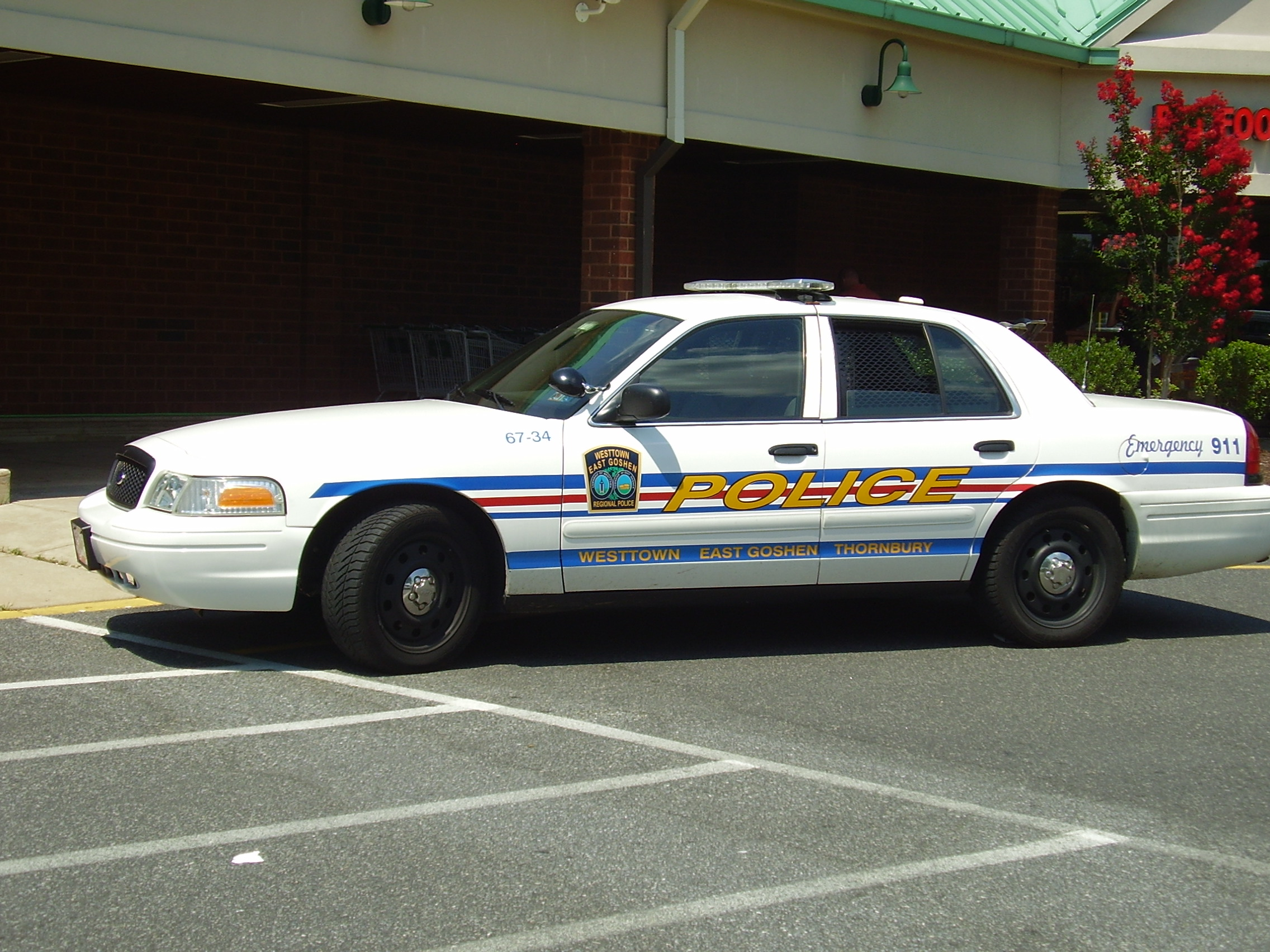
A police car of the Westtown-East Goshen Regional Police Department, serving East Goshen Township, Westtown Township, and Thornbury Township in Chester County

East Goshen Township is a township in Chester County, Pennsylvania, United States. The population was 18,421 at the 2020 census.

== History ==
The ten square miles of land that is now the township of East Goshen was part of a larger tract purchased from William Penn in Wales in September 1681. Settlers, finding the land beautiful and productive, named the area Goshenville, or "the Land of Goshen."

The blacksmith shop located on North Chester Road was built in 1699. It was here in the early years that wagon wheels were re-rimmed, farm implements repaired, and horses shod. As part of East Goshen's tricentennial in 1982, the blacksmith shop was renovated and restored.

East Goshen Township was incorporated in 1817 when Goshen was divided, forming East and West Goshen townships.

The Goshenville Historic District, Goodwin Acres, and Ellis Williams House are listed on the National Register of Historic Places.

== Resources ==
East Goshen Township owns a 55-acre (220,000 m^{2}) park located on Paoli Pike. Facilities at the park include the Hicks Pavilion with a brick barbecue.

There are areas in the park for sports such as baseball, softball, and soccer fields, four sand volleyball courts, six tennis courts with wind screens and hitting backboard, two full-size basketball courts with additional baskets for shooting around, a 1.5-mile (2.4 km) equipped fitness trail, a children's activity area, a putting green, and a gazebo.

The park has many passive areas for sunbathing, reading, frisbee throwing, etc. The park is also a popular place for walkers and joggers. It has restroom facilities and water fountains. Parking space has been enhanced and all facilities are planned and installed with the idea of maintaining a harmony with nature. The park closes at dusk and drinking alcohol is prohibited.

The park was named "The Best Family Park" by Best of the Main Line, a magazine that rates the best places and food in the Philadelphia Main Line area.

As of 2016, the Board of Supervisors approved application to the Chesco Municipal Grant Program for a Paoli Pike Trail. The 2.7-mile trail would connect East High School with the “Town Center” between Boot Road and North Chester Road and then the entire network of trails in the Township Park and Applebrook Park. This trail is envisioned as part of a much larger 750-mile trail network that would connect most of suburban Philadelphia. About 300 miles of this trail network, including the Chester Valley Trail, have already been constructed as of 2016.

== Geography ==
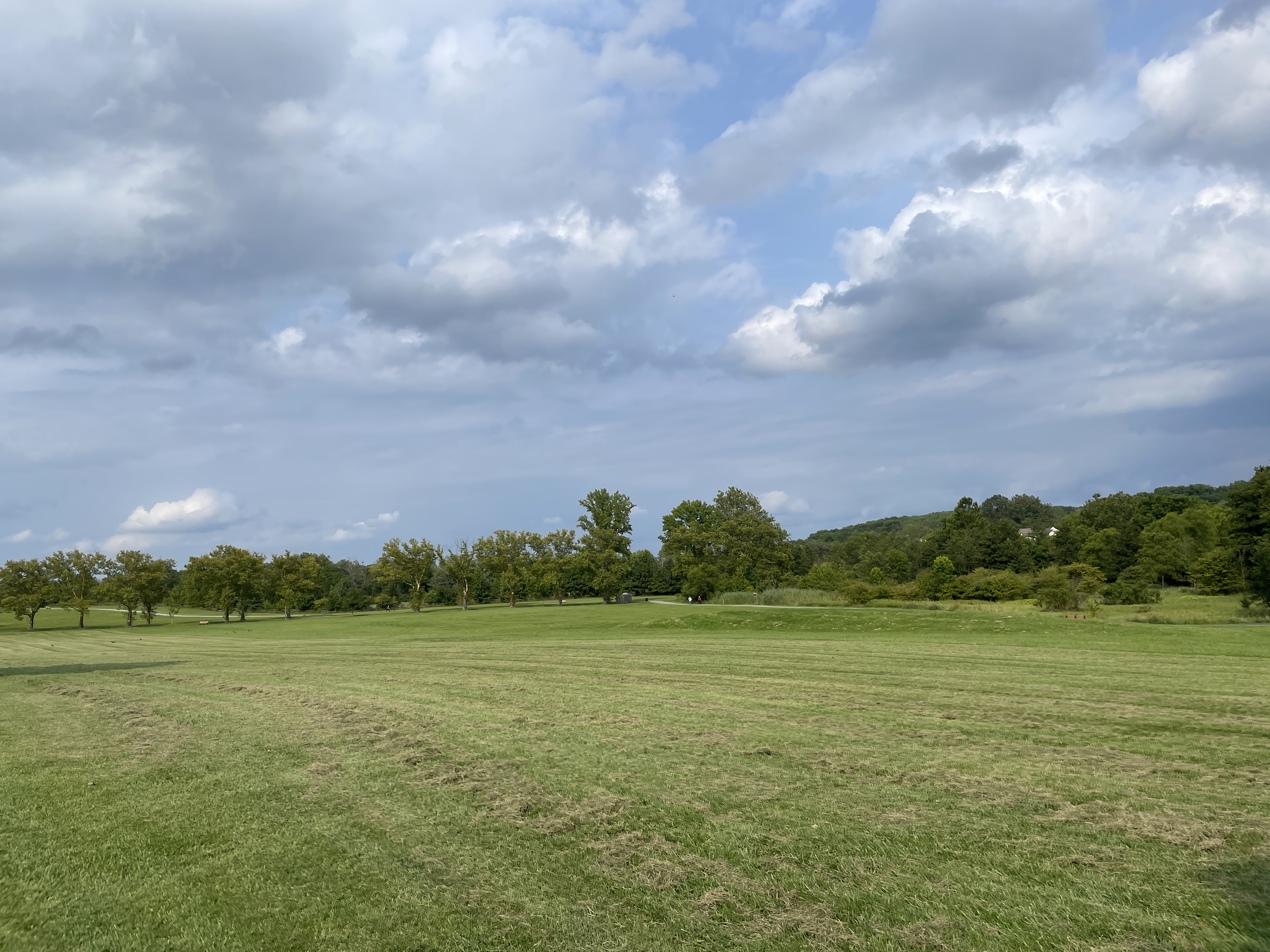
Applebrook Park

According to the United States Census Bureau, the township has a total area of 10.2 square miles (26 km^{2}), of which 10.1 square miles (26 km^{2}) is land and 0.04 square miles (0.10 km^{2}), or 0.30%, is water. The township is within the Brandywine Creek watershed. The township's border with its neighbor West Goshen is Airport Road, next to the Brandywine Airport.

Adjacent townships

- West Whiteland Township (northwest)
- East Whiteland Township (north)
- Willistown Township (east)
- Westtown Township (south)
- West Goshen Township (west)

== Government ==
The Township is governed by a five-person Board of Supervisors. Supervisors are elected to six-year terms. The Board of Supervisors appoints the Township Manager, who is responsible for the day-to-day operation of the Township. In addition, various volunteer advisory authorities, boards and commissions (ABCs), such as the Park & Recreation Commission, the Planning Commission, the Commerce Commission, the Historical Commission and the Conservancy Board, provide recommendations to the Board of Supervisors.

== Demographics ==
Historical population
Census	Pop.	Note	%±
1930	739		—
1940	867		17.3%
1950	1,039		19.8%
1960	1,694		63.0%
1970	5,138		203.3%
1980	10,021		95.0%
1990	15,138		51.1%
2000	16,824		11.1%
2010	18,026		7.1%
2020	18,421		2.2%
2023 (est.)	18,338		−0.5%

As of the census of 2010, there were 18,026 people, 8,128 households, and 4,811 families residing in the township. The population density was 1,767.3 inhabitants per square mile (682.4/km^{2}). There were 8,655 housing units at an average density of 848.53 per square mile (327.62/km^{2}). The racial makeup of the township was 92.6% White, 2.7% African American, 0.1% Native American, 2.9% Asian, 0.5% from other races, and 1.2% from two or more races. Hispanic or Latino of any race were 2.2% of the population.

There were 8,128 households, out of which 20.7% had children under the age of 18 living with them, 51.3% were married couples living together, 5.9% had a female householder with no husband present, and 40.8% were non-families. 34.5% of all households were made up of individuals, and 38.4% had someone living alone who was 65 years of age or older. The average household size was 2.22 and the average family size was 2.89.

In the township, 20.5% of the population is under the age of 20, 4.9% from 18 to 24, 21.6% from 25 to 44, 28.1% from 45 to 64, and 24.9% who were 65 years of age or older. The median age was 47.3 years. For every 100 females there were 86 males. For every 100 females age 20 and over, there were 82 males.

As of the 2010 United States Census, the median income for a household in the township was $73,266, and the median income for a family was $99,188. Males had a median income of $74,363 versus $50,730 for females among full-time, year-round workers. The per capita income for the township was $47,359. About 2.7% of families and 5.0% of the population were below the poverty line, including 3.9% of those under age 18 and 6.4% of those age 65 or over.

== Transportation ==
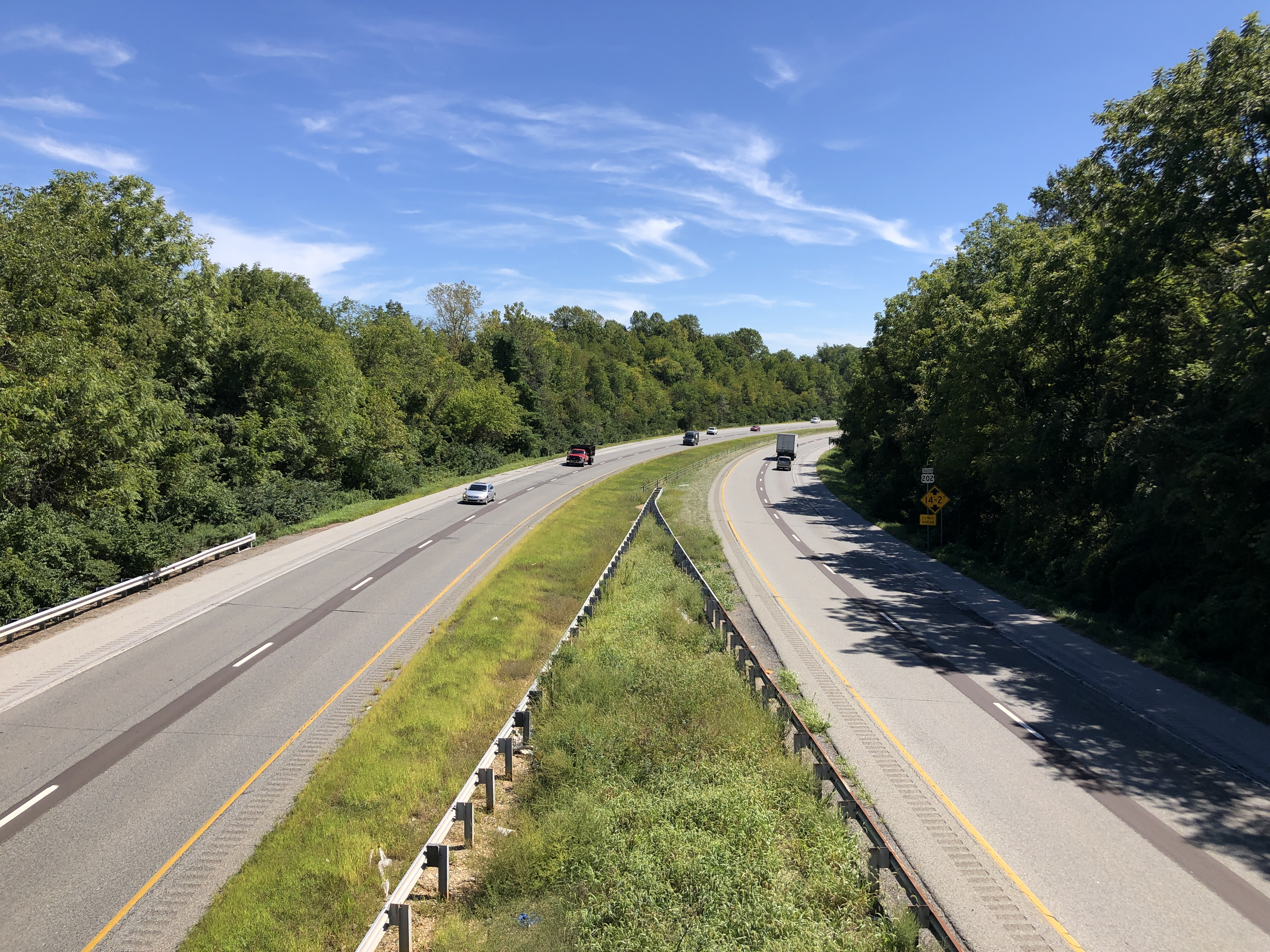
US 202 southbound in East Goshen Township

As of 2021, there were 78.66 miles (126.59 km) of public roads in East Goshen Township, of which 16.68 miles (26.84 km) were maintained by the Pennsylvania Department of Transportation (PennDOT) and 61.98 miles (99.75 km) were maintained by the township.

Numbered roads passing through East Goshen Township include U.S. Route 202, Pennsylvania Route 3 and Pennsylvania Route 352. US 202 follows a north-south alignment through the northwestern tip of the township, though the nearest interchange is just outside the township along Boot Road in West Goshen Township. PA 3 follows West Chester Pike along an east-west alignment through the southern portion of the township. Finally, PA 352 follows Chester Road along a northwest-southeast alignment through the center of the township.

== Schools ==
East Goshen is home to East Goshen Elementary School (located in the West Chester Area School District).

Elementary schools serving sections of East Goshen township include East Goshen, Exton, Fern Hill, Glen Wood, and Penn Acres. Almost all areas of East Goshen township are zoned to J.R. Fugett Middle School and West Chester East High School, while a small portion is zoned to G.A. Stetson Middle School and Rustin High School.

East Goshen township is also home to Goshen Friends School, and the Pennsylvania Leadership Charter School.

SS. Peter and Paul School is in the township.
