= Penn-Delco School District =

School district in Pennsylvania

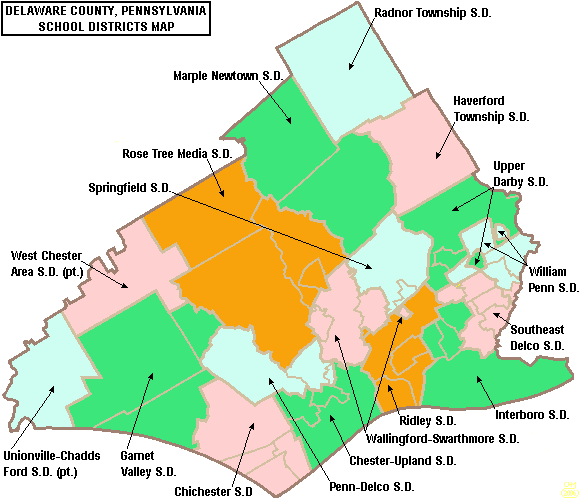
- Map of school districts of Delaware County

Address
- 2821 Concord Road Aston, Pennsylvania, 19014; United States

District information
- Type: Public

Other information
- Website: Penn-Delco School District

The Penn-Delco School District is a midsized, suburban public school district in Delaware County, Pennsylvania, that encompasses the following municipalities: Aston Township, Brookhaven Borough, and Parkside Borough. Penn-Delco School district encompasses approximately 9 square miles. According to 2010 local census data it serves a resident population of 26,455. In 2009, the district residents’ per capita income was $23,035, while the median family income was $61,417. In the Commonwealth, the median family income was $49,501 and the United States' median family income was $49,445, in 2010.

Started in 1960 by Dr. William G. Moser, who served as the district's first superintendent, the district was carved out of the nearby present-day Chester-Upland School District and was instrumental for the building of the Sun Valley Senior High School and administration building on land donated by the Sun Oil Company (now Sunoco). In addition to the regular curriculum, in 1976, the U.S. Marine Corps Jr. ROTC (MCJROTC) program was offered for the first time and was only one of three MCJROTC units in the Philadelphia metropolitan area – the others being in nearby Chester City and in Bensalem.

== Schools ==
The Penn-Delco School District operates the following schools:

- Aston Elementary School, Aston
- Coebourn Elementary School, Brookhaven
- Northley Middle School, Aston
- Parkside Elementary School, Parkside
- Pennell Elementary School, Aston
- Sun Valley High School, Aston

The following schools were once operated by the district, but have been closed and/or demolished:

- Washington Grammar School, Brookhaven (This later became Brookhaven Elementary School, then the Brookhaven Municipal Building before being demolished. A Walgreens drugstore was built on the site.)
- Green Ridge Elementary School, Aston (demolished in 1997 and is now the site of the Aston Community Center and Aston Free Library)
- Brookhaven Junior High School, Brookhaven (later became Brookhaven Middle School before being sold to The Christian Academy)

== Extracurriculars ==
The district offers a variety of clubs, activities and sports.

The Sun Valley High School Vanguards play all interscholastic games in the Ches-Mont League. Until 2007, Sun Valley was part of the Del-Val league, and prior to 2006, had played inter-league games with schools in the Ches-Mont and Southern Chester County Leagues. It became an associate member of the new unified Ches-Mont League starting in the 2007–08 school year, with full membership starting in the 2008–09 year. Its ice hockey team has no school sponsorship and is an independent affiliate of the ICSHL
