= Bruce Larkin =

American writer (born 1957)

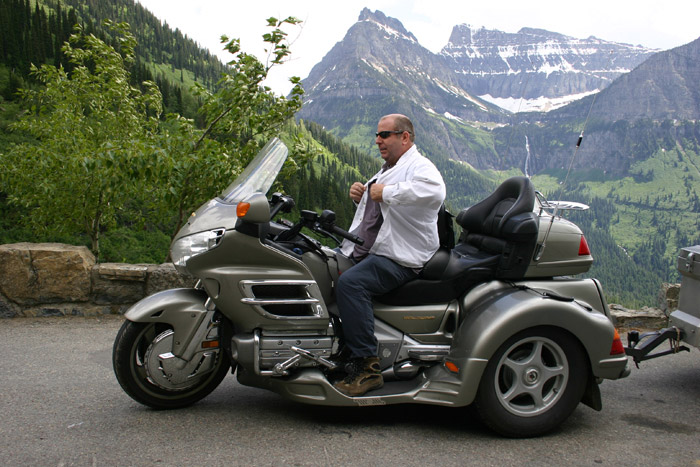
- Bruce Larkin in Montana
- Born: January 23, 1957 (age 69); West Chester, Pennsylvania
- Occupations: Author, Poet
- Writing career
- Genre: Children's literature
- Website: www.brucelarkin.com

Bruce Larkin (born January 23, 1957) is a children's book author and philanthropist who writes in English and Spanish. Many of his works are published by Wilbooks, an educational publishing company. Larkin's books are primarily used to teach young children how to read. Larkin has published more than 1,500 book titles, both fiction and non-fiction, for beginner readers. Bruce Larkin is known for his philanthropic efforts in the field of literacy. In November and December 2009, Larkin donated over 400,000 books to schools all around the United States. Larkin was named the 2012 Children's Poet of the Year by the Literacy Empowerment Foundation.

Larkin has an interest in jackalopes, and refers to himself as a "jackalopoligist" with a specialty in "flaggerdoots".

== Biography ==
Bruce Larkin, a children's book author, and poet was born on January 23, 1957, in West Chester, Pennsylvania. He attended the Saint Simon and Jude school in Westtown Township, Pennsylvania. Larkin also attended Henderson High School in West Chester. Larkin served for four years in the United States Coast Guard, as a small boat crew member, and later as a search-and-rescue Air-crewman. After leaving the Coast Guard, Larkin attended The Richard Stockton College of New Jersey, located in Galloway Township, New Jersey.

Larkin was a member of the Westtown-Goshen Rotary Club in West Chester.
