= Ellis Williams House =

Historic house in Pennsylvania, United States

- U.S. National Register of Historic Places
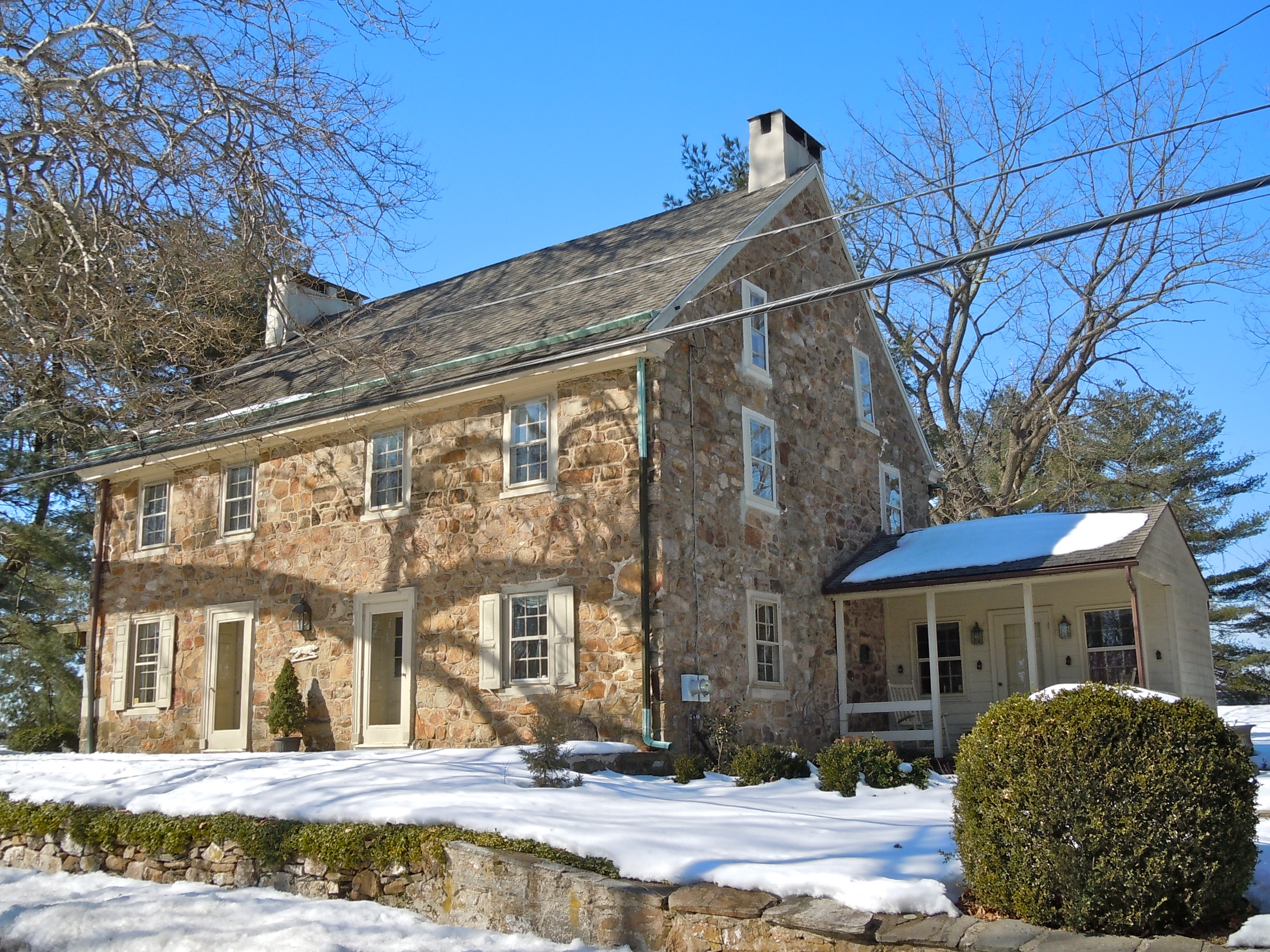
- Ellis Williams House, February 2011

- Location within Pennsylvania Location within the United States
- Location: 1711 E. Boot Rd., East Goshen Township, Pennsylvania
- Coordinates: 39°59′58″N 75°31′45″W
- Area: 1 acre (0.40 ha)
- Built: c. 1754, c. 1790, c. 1820
- Built by: Williams, Ellis
- Architectural style: Colonial Revival, Other, Penn Plan house
- NRHP reference No.: 04000835
- Added to NRHP: August 11, 2004

Ellis Williams House, also known as the Spatz Property and Allston Spatz House, is a historic home located in East Goshen Township, Chester County, Pennsylvania. It was built in three sections. It is a two-story, four bay stone dwelling. The older section dates to about 1754, and was built on the Penn Plan. It is believed to have been built on the foundations of an earlier dwelling built in 1704. The original house was expanded about 1790 to a "four room house," then a workshop addition was built about 1820. Another addition was built about 1930, then rebuilt in 1997.

It was added to the National Register of Historic Places in 2004.
