= Goodwin Acres =

Historic house in Pennsylvania, United States

- U.S. National Register of Historic Places
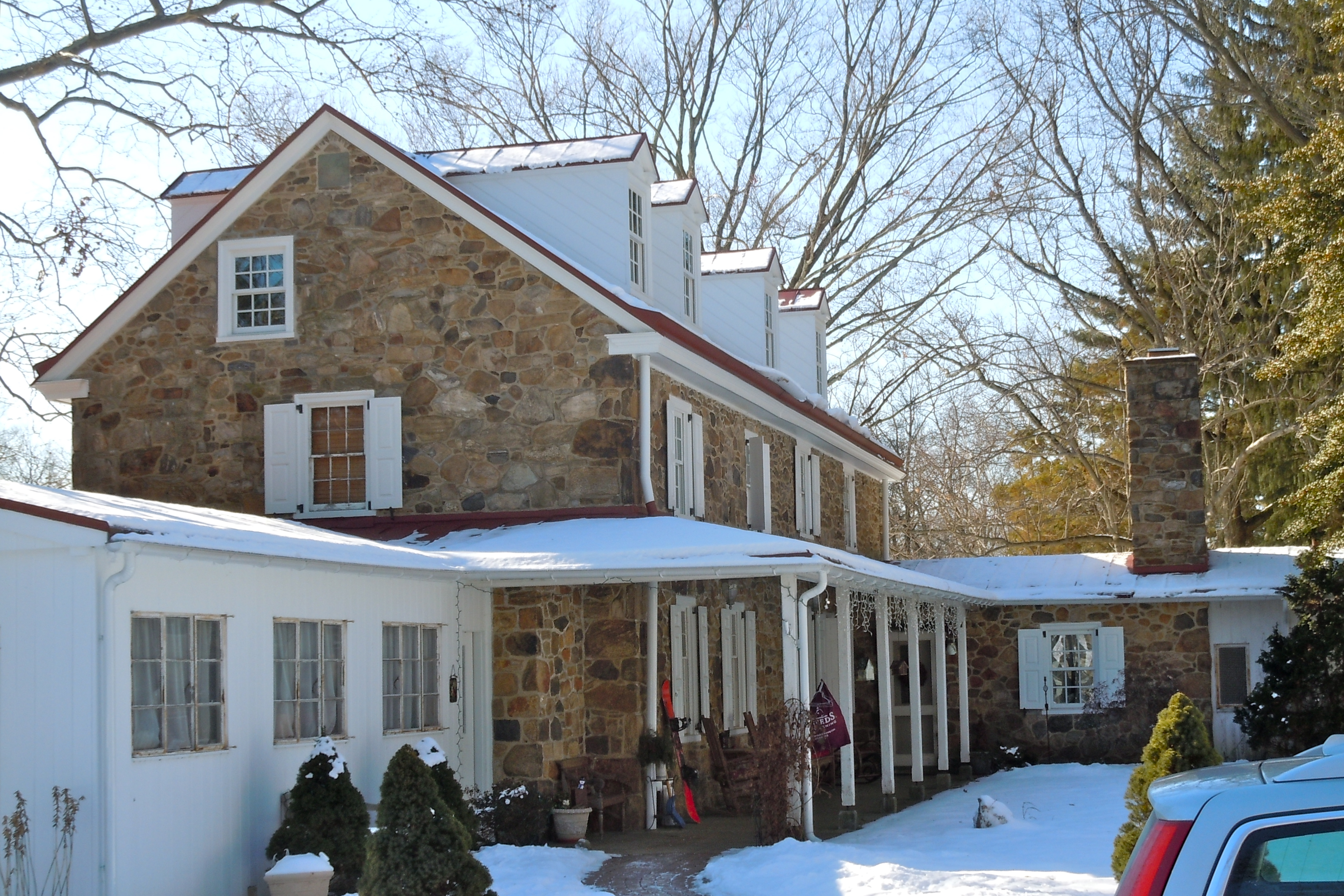
- Goodwin Acres, January 2011

- Location within Pennsylvania Location within the United States
- Location: 600 Reservoir Road, near West Chester, East Goshen Township, Pennsylvania
- Coordinates: 39°58′55″N 75°33′16″W
- Area: 14.9 acres (6.0 ha)
- Built: c. 1736, c. 1749, c. 1840
- NRHP reference No.: 80003471
- Added to NRHP: June 27, 1980

Goodwin Acres is an historic home which is located in East Goshen Township, Chester County, Pennsylvania.

It was listed on the National Register of Historic Places in 1980.

== History and architectural features ==
Built sometime around 1736, with two additions that were erected circa 1749 and 1840, it is a 2 1/2-story, four-bay by one-bay, coursed fieldstone dwelling with a gable roof with dormers. The western addition is a low, one-story structure with a gently pitched gable roof. The eastern addition is one-story. The additions are unified to the main structure by a porch. An enclosed porch and library were added in 1941. Also located on the property are a stone-and-frame Pennsylvania bank barn (c. 1900) and a stone spring house.
