= Sun Valley High School (Pennsylvania) =

Coordinates: 39.8586°N 75.4167°W

- Aston, Pennsylvania 19014; United States

Information
- School type: Public, Secondary
- Established: 1960
- School district: Penn-Delco School District
- Principal: John Paul Roskos
- Faculty: 75.80 (FTE)
- Grades: 9th - 12th
- Enrollment: 1,070 (2023–24)
- Student to teacher ratio: 14.12
- Colors: Navy Blue; Vegas Gold
- Athletics: PIAA; Ches-Mont League
- Mascot: Vanguard
- Rival: Chichester High School
- Feeder schools: Northley Middle School
- Website: svhs.pdsd.org

Sun Valley High School is a public high school in Aston, Pennsylvania, a part of Delaware County in the Philadelphia suburbs. It is the only high school in the Penn-Delco School District.

Sun Valley's team name is the Vanguards and the mascot is the Griffin. The term vanguard refers to the front line or leading part of an advancing formation. The Griffin is a mythical creature. The official school colors are columbia blue and vegas gold.

== Academics ==
=== Curriculum ===
Core classes-math, English, social studies, and science-are based on a three-tier system based on student ability, from academic classes to honors level to Advanced Placement. Sun Valley uses a weighted GPA to reflect the change in difficulty between tiers. In order to graduate, students are required to take four years of math and English, 4 years of either social studies or science, 3 years of one of those two, and a total of nine elective credits (which can be divided over the four years).

=== Standardized Testing ===
Students in the state of Pennsylvania are required to take the Keystone Exams in order to complete select courses and to graduate. Keystone Exams are required for Algebra I, Biology, and Literature. Sun Valley has a 23.7 percentile score on overall Keystone Exams. In mathematics, Sun Valley had a 61% proficiency rate, a percent above the state average. In reading, Sun Valley has a 46% proficiency rate, which is 24% lower than the state average.

Proficiency	Math	Reading
Below Basic	10%	15%
Basic	29%	39%
Proficient	45%	46%
Advanced	16%	0%

Sun Valley offers various Advanced Placement classes. The school has a 58% passing rate, putting it in the 75th percentile. Sun Valley does not offer IB exams.

== Arts ==
There are four band ensembles at Sun Valley (Concert Band, Marching Band, Jazz Band, and Freshmen Percussion), as well as two choir ensembles (Concert Choir and Chamber Choir). The concert ensembles perform two concerts every year, one in the winter and one in the spring. In the spring the two concerts are held separately, while the winter is combined. The later also features the Freshmen Percussion ensemble, featuring developing percussionists. In the winter, the choir holds a fundraising performance entitled Decades, in which students perform pieces from the 1960s to today. The audition-only Chamber Choir performs at choir concerts and at various other local events.

The Sun Valley Marching Vanguards have had unprecedented success for the school at regional competitions, winning six total championships. They won the TOB Atlantic Coast Championship four times: 1977 (tie), 1979, 1980, and 1981. The band now competes in Cavalcade of Bands' American division. In the Cavalcade, they have three Open Class championships (2015, 2016, 2023, and 2026).

The Sun Valley theater department performs a musical every spring. The department has been recognized several times by the Greater Philadelphia Cappies, a regional award ceremony for high school theater.

The art program at Sun Valley often features student artwork throughout the region, displaying them in local establishments and the district's annual calendar. The school holds an annual art show called Arts Alive!, which features art from all students enrolled in Sun Valley's various art classes that year.

== Athletics ==
Sun Valley competes in the PIAA's Ches-Mont League, along with 13 schools from Chester County. Prior to 2007, Sun Valley competed in the Del-Val league, along with other nearby schools. Sun Valley fields varsity teams in 15 PIAA-sanctioned sports:

Fall	Winter	Spring
Cross Country	Basketball	Baseball
Field Hockey	Indoor Track	Lacrosse
Football	Swimming & Diving	Softball
Golf	Wrestling	Boys' Tennis
Soccer		Track & Field
Girls' Tennis		
Volleyball		

The Sun Valley cheer team competes at various competitions throughout the winter. In 2019 and 2020, they were selected to attend the UCA National Cheer Championships in Walt Disney World.

Though not officially a school sponsored sport, Sun Valley fields a boys' ice hockey team that competes in the Inter-County Scholastic Hockey League (ICSHL). Four times (2008, 2014, 2019, and 2020) the team earned a spot in the Flyers Cup tournament, which serves as the championship for high school ice hockey in the eastern half of Pennsylvania.

The school sponsors a unified bocce team that competes against other schools as part of the Pennsylvania Special Olympics. The team has made three trips to the state tournament in Hershey, Pennsylvania, earning silver medals in 2018 and 2019.

Sun Valley also operates a rec league style ultimate Frisbee tournament. Students are drafted onto teams ran by various teachers. The teams then compete in a season that runs from late-November into February.

=== Thanksgiving ===
The Sun Valley varsity football team faces off against rival Chichester on Thanksgiving Day each year. The two teams alternate hosting duties, with Sun Valley hosting the 2021 edition, in which Chichester wins 20-13. Sun Valley currently leads the series 22-13.

== Demographics ==
=== Race ===
As of 2016-17:

Group	Number of Students	Percentage of Student Body
All	1,053	100%
White	898	85%
Black	81	8%
Asian	31	3%
Hispanic	25	2%
American Indian/Alaska Native	0	0%
Native Hawaiian/Pacific Islander	1	0.1%
Two or More Races	17	2%

=== Gender ===
As of 2016-17:

Gender	Number of Students	Percentage of Student Body
Male	536	51%
Female	517	49%

=== Economic ===
According to the NCES, 226 students (approximately 21% of the student body) are eligible for free lunches, with another 32 (approximately 3%) eligible for reduced lunches.

== See also ==
- Penn-Delco School District
