= Collins Mansion =

Historic house in Pennsylvania, United States

- U.S. National Register of Historic Places
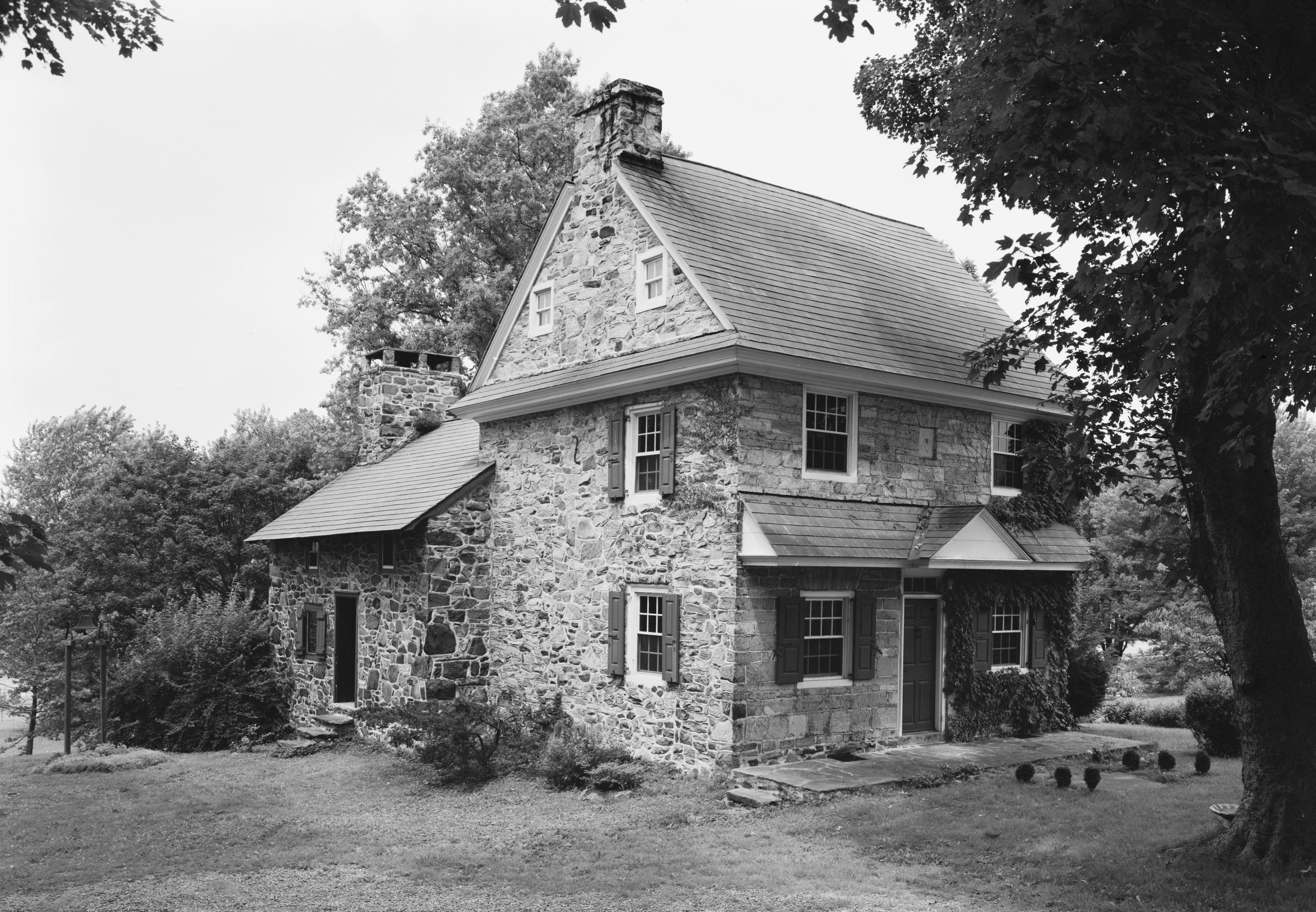
- Collins Mansion, HABS Photo, August 1958

- Location within Pennsylvania Location within the United States
- Location: 633 Goshen Rd., near West Chester, West Goshen Township, Pennsylvania
- Coordinates: 39°58′30″N 75°36′14″W
- Area: 3.5 acres (1.4 ha)
- Built: 1727, 1758-1760
- NRHP reference No.: 72001110
- Added to NRHP: November 9, 1972

Collins Mansion, also known as the Joseph Collins House, is a historic home located in West Goshen Township, Chester County, Pennsylvania. It was built in 1727, and is a 2 1/2-story stone dwelling with a serpentine stone facade and fieldstone sidewalls. It was extensively renovated in 1758–1760. It is considered the oldest dwelling in West Chester.

It was listed on the National Register of Historic Places in 1972.
