= Brandywine Regional Airport =

Airport in Pennsylvania, United States

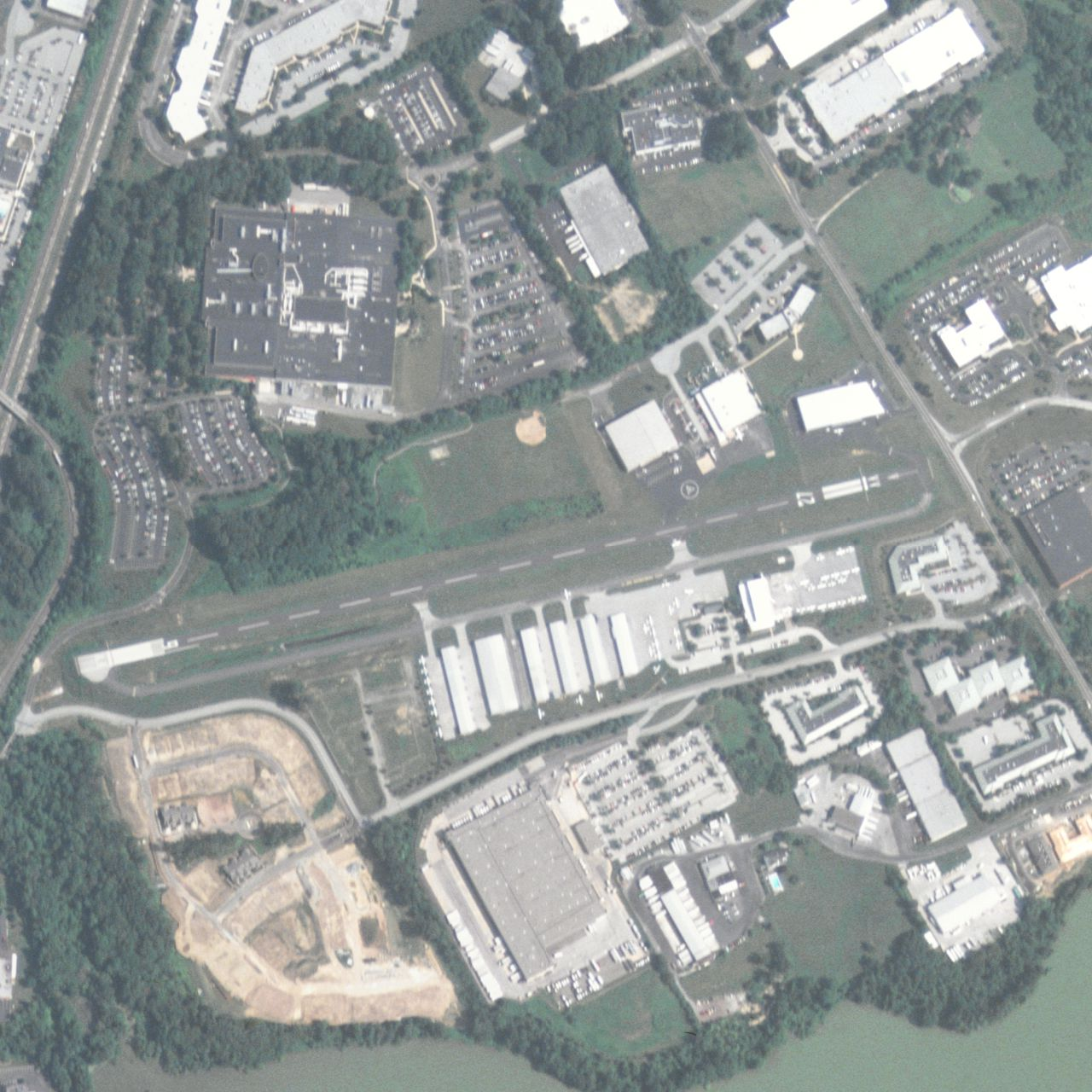
- USGS 2006 orthophoto
- IATA: none; ICAO: KOQN; FAA LID: OQN

Summary
- Airport type: Public
- Owner: New Brandywine Airport Club, Inc.
- Serves: West Chester, Pennsylvania
- Location: West Goshen Township, Pennsylvania
- Elevation AMSL: 466 ft (142 m)
- Coordinates: 39°59′24″N 075°34′55″W
- Website: brandywineairport.com

Map
- Location of airport in Pennsylvania OQN (the United States)

Runways
Direction	Length		Surface
Direction	ft	m	Surface
9/27	3,347	1,020	Asphalt

Statistics (2016)
- Aircraft operations: 60,065
- Based aircraft: 124
- Source: Federal Aviation Administration

Brandywine Regional Airport (ICAO: KOQN, FAA LID: OQN, formerly N99) is a public-use general aviation airport in West Goshen Township, Pennsylvania, United States, three miles northeast of West Chester. It is designated as a reliever airport and a regional general aviation airport by the FAA. It is privately owned by the New Brandywine Airport Club Inc, with a single fixed-base operator (New Brandywine Aero, Inc.), aircraft repair, as well as flight training in both fixed-wing and rotary aircraft. The American Helicopter Museum and Education Center is located adjacent to the airport, with taxiway access.

The airport identifier was previously N99 until it was changed to OQN in 2007. The airport does not currently have an IATA identifier.

== History ==
=== Early Days ===
West Chester's first airport, Sky Haven Airport, opened in 1929 on farmland in East Goshen Township, two miles east of present-day Brandywine Regional Airport. Sky Haven operated for three years, when the airport neighbors filed a civil lawsuit. Judge William Windle ruled the airport a public nuisance and ordered it to cease operation.

Brandywine Regional Airport, then named West Chester Airport, opened in its current location in 1940. Paul Gingrich opened the airport using a $623,500 grant from the Civil Aeronautics Board. Gingrich was a flight instructor at the former Main Line Airport in Paoli, Pennsylvania, which was rapidly expanding that flight school with funding from the newly created Civilian Pilot Training Program. West Chester State Teacher's College (now West Chester University) was already offering aeronautics courses and was interested in an airport closer to the campus.

In 1947, William B. Wilson purchased the airport, which had two grass runways (the current runway 9/27, a perpendicular runway 18/36), and several maintenance buildings. The airport underwent significant improvements in the 1980s. Runway 9/27, as well as the taxiways and ramps, were all paved, and a new terminal building was constructed. In 1982, the airport was renamed Brandywine Airport. Expansion of the neighboring industrial park also led to the removal of Runway 18/36.

=== New Owners and Improvements ===
In 1997, Wilson put the airport up for sale as an industrial park. A group of pilots formed the non-profit New Brandywine Airport Club (NBAC) to purchase and run the airport. Wilson was supportive of this plan, and the sale to NBAC for $2.5 million closed on July 25, 1997. To raise initial financing, NBAC sold ownership shares valued at $10,000. Two shares were required for a Tee hangar, and four shares were required for a corporate hangar. In addition, owners were responsible for construction costs. In total, 50 Tee hangars and 10 corporate hangars were constructed after the purchase.

After the purchase by NBAC, several significant projects were undertaken to rehabilitate and improve the facilities. The western end of Runway 9/27 was lengthened by approximately 300 feet in 1997. In 2001, the airport received a grant from Pennsylavania's Department of Transport (PennDOT) to develop an airport layout plan, which helped make the airport eligible for further federal and state funding under the FAA's Airport Improvement Program. Additional corporate hangars were constructed in 2004. In 2006, several projects were completed to improved safety and night operations: Runway 9/27 was resurfaced, new night lighting was added, a precision approach path indicator (PAPI) was added to the runway, and Taxiway A was lengthened to the western end of the runway. In addition, the airport commissioned a new AWOS weather reporting system in 2007. Once the AWOS was operational, the airport's FAA location identifier was changed to OQN from N99, and the airport was assigned the ICAO identifier KOQN. Since then, the airport received PennDOT grants to replace the fuel piping system, install a new airport beacon, and rehabilitate Taxiway A.

The FAA classifies Brandywine Regional Airport as a reliever airport for handling overflow general aviation aircraft from Philadelphia International Airport. Brandywine is also categorized as a regional general aviation airport because of its significance within the metropolitan region. PennDOT's Bureau of Aviation classifies Brandywine as an Intermediate general aviation airport. A 2011 study commissioned by PennDOT reported that Brandywine Regional Airport had an impact of $9.4 million to the state economy.

=== Expansion Plans ===
The airport has commissioned a feasibility study for the implementation of a localizer performance with vertical guidance (LPV) approach for runway 9/27. The LPV study also involves the removal of trees to facilitate night VFR operations and vertically guided approaches. The airport is expecting another grant from the Pennsylvania Department of Transportation Bureau of Aviation to widen Runway 9/27 to 60 feet. Additional proposed projects include replacing the AWOS III and a rehabilitation of the runway lighting.

=== Accidents and incidents ===
Since 1962, two fatal accidents have occurred at Brandywine Regional Airport.

- On August 22, 2005, a Piper PA-32R-301 crashed into the trees after an aborted landing, killing both the pilot and the passenger. Witnesses observed the plane attempt to land and contact the runway with the landing gear retracted. The pilot then aborted the landing, but crashed 1/2 mile from the runway with the landing gear extended. The investigation found indications that the propeller had been damaged by contact with the runway.
- On March 29, 2015, two pilots were killed when their Piper PA-28-140 crashed after takeoff on Runway 27. The subsequent investigation indicated that the plane engine exhibited popping sounds and intermittent loss of power during run-up and take off. Shortly after takeoff, the aircraft went into a stall and crashed into a field about 2 miles west of the airport.

== Facilities ==
Brandywine Regional Airport covers 44 acres (18 ha) at an elevation of 466 feet (142 m). In the year ending September 21, 2016 the airport had 60,065 aircraft operations, average 164 per day: 98% general aviation and 2% air taxi. 124 aircraft were then based at the airport: 85% single-engine, 6% multi-engine, 1% jet and 8% helicopter. The one runway, 9/27, is 3,347 by 50 feet (1,020 x 15 m) asphalt. The runway is equipped with low-intensity runway lights (LIRL) and a 2-light precision approach path indicator (PAPI).

The airport has one terminal building served by the single fixed-base operator, New Brandywine Aero, Inc. Maintenance services are provided by Flight Dynamics. Brandywine Flight School provides fixed-wing instruction. The American Helicopter Museum and Education Center is adjacent to the airport on the north, with taxiway access to the runway. The museum hosted the Rotorfest helicopter airshow annually from 1996 through 2014.

== See also ==
- List of airports in Pennsylvania
