= County Bridge No. 148 =

- U.S. National Register of Historic Places
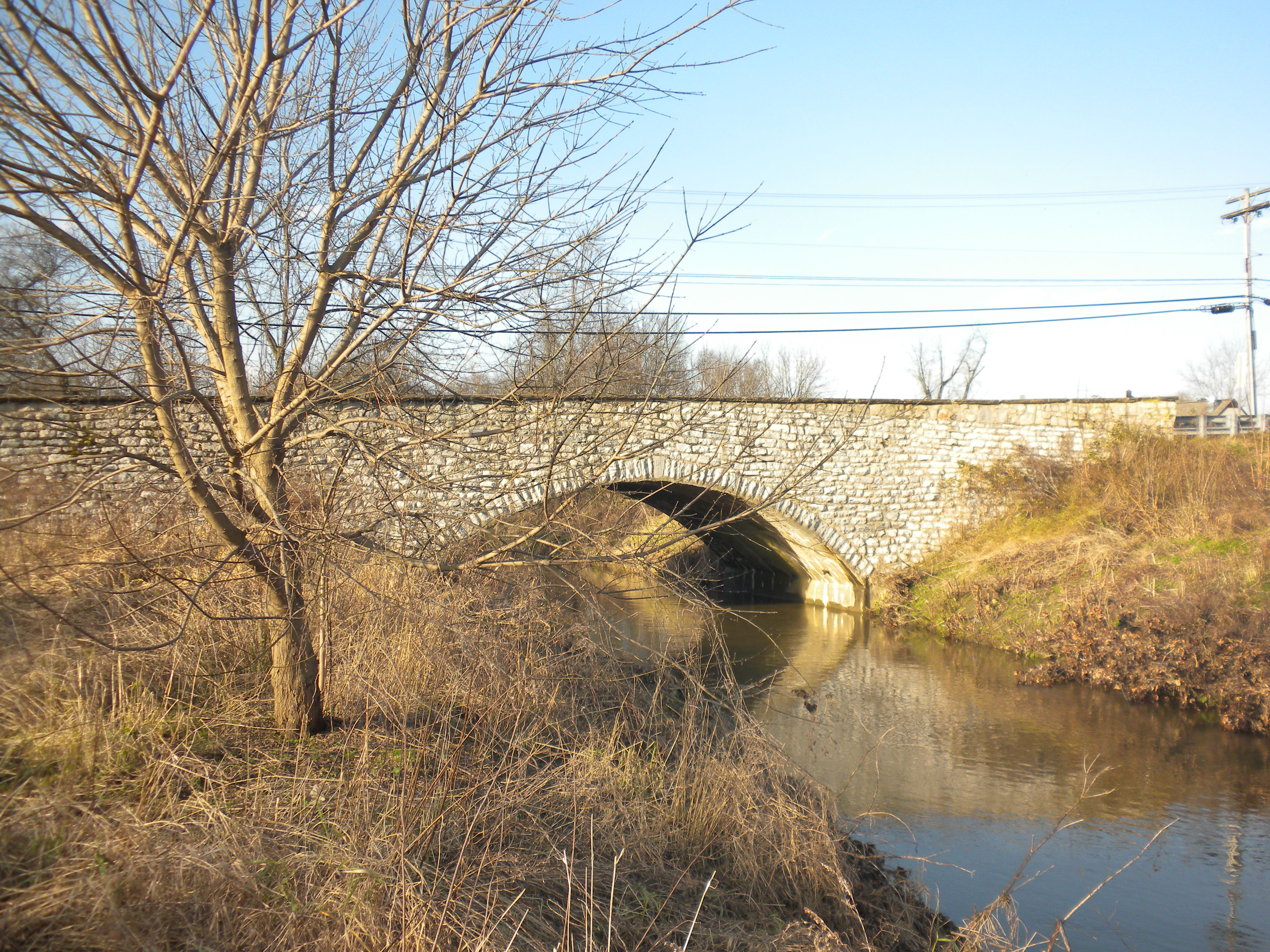
- County Bridge No. 148, December 2009

- Location within Pennsylvania Location within the United States
- Location: Pennsylvania Route 926 over Chester Creek, near Westtown, Westtown Township, Pennsylvania
- Coordinates: 39°55′54″N 75°33′6″W
- Area: less than one acre
- Built: 1911
- Built by: McCormick, P.J., & Sons
- MPS: Highway Bridges Owned by the Commonwealth of Pennsylvania, Department of Transportation TR
- NRHP reference No.: 88000879
- Added to NRHP: June 22, 1988

County Bridge No. 148 is a historic stone arch bridge located on the border of Westtown Township and Thornbury Township in Chester County, Pennsylvania. It spans a branch of Chester Creek. It has a single span measuring 36 feet (11 m) long. The bridge was constructed in 1911, of coursed roughly square stone in a camelback shape.

It was listed on the National Register of Historic Places in 1988.
