= Henderson High School (Pennsylvania) =

B. Reed Henderson High School

Location
- West Chester, Pennsylvania; United States; 39.9678°N 75.5991°W

Information
- Type: High School
- Established: 1866
- Principal: Jason P. Sherlock
- Staff: 105.90 (FTE)
- Grades: 9-12
- Enrollment: 1,445 (2024-25)
- Student to teacher ratio: 13.83
- Colors: Garnet and white
- Athletics: Division I Pennsylvania Interscholastic Athletic Association
- Mascot: Warrior
- Website: Official Website

B. Reed Henderson High School is located partially in the borough of West Chester and partially in West Goshen Township in Pennsylvania. B. Reed Henderson is one of the three high schools (Henderson, East, and Rustin) in the West Chester Area School District.

It serves portions of the following municipalities: West Chester borough, West Goshen Township, East Bradford Township, and West Whiteland Township. West Chester Henderson serves about half of the Exton census-designated place, entirely in West Whiteland Township.

== History ==
The original school, named West Chester High School, was located at North Church and Biddle Streets in West Chester. The first graduating class was composed of five girls who graduated in 1866. The next graduation did not occur until 1869. Since that year, the school has graduated a class annually. In 1906, a new school was built adjacent to the old one on North Church Street. During this time the Garnet and White, the annual yearbook, was established and continues to this day. In 1923, the Student Council was created to help students and staff work together. With the expansion of athletics, the school needed room for sports fields. In 1923 a stadium was built on Penn Street and stands to this day. The stadium is named J. Oscar Dicks Stadium after the man on the School Board's Athletic Committee who helped lobby for the stadium.

On December 22, 1947, fire destroyed the school. The principal at the time was B. Reed Henderson and the rebuilt school would later be named after him. Onlookers to the fire witnessed catastrophic failure of the roof and flames estimated at 100 feet high. The community was stunned by the destruction of their beloved school. Parents from outside the district had paid extra money to send their students to the school, which was well known for its academic excellence. At the time of the fire, plans were already underway to build a new school on the property next to the athletic stadium. In the interim, students from the high school were placed in the adjacent junior high building until the new school was completed. The school operated on half days for junior high students and the other half for high school students.

In February 1951, the West Chester Joint High School was opened at the school's current location on Montgomery Avenue. The word "joint" was used because surrounding townships who send students here had helped pay for the construction. In 1954, a junior high occupied east side of the building, but became part of the high school after growing enrollment. In 1968, the school was renamed B. Reed Henderson High School after the longest serving principal of any high school in the district. In 1966, the surrounding areas officially became the K-12 West Chester Area School District. Rising enrollment once again outpaced building capacity and West Chester East High School was built. The building was renovated in the 1970s, adding a new library and second cafeteria. In later years, the auditorium was refurbished and bathrooms updated. In 2003, renovations and additions took place.

== Accomplishments ==
- Blue Ribbon Award for Excellence from the U.S. Department of Education

=== Academics ===
Henderson is a home to many successful academic teams including the Mathematics Team, which has won numerous state math contests, the Academic Team, Science Olympiad, and Physics Olympiad. The Henderson Academic Team won the 2011 and 2012 Pennsylvania State Championship in a tournament held at the capital building in Harrisburg. Henderson also has a great variety of clubs; one of the most popular, the Astronomy Club, has recently acquired a high powered telescope through a generous donation.

=== Athletics ===
In September 2020, Principal Jason Sherlock announced that the school would be distancing its athletic imagery away from discredited associations with Native American culture echoing a broader movement nationwide.

== Notable alumni ==
- Lillian DeBaptiste, mayor of West Chester, Pennsylvania
- Samuel Barber, classical composer
- Nick Bockrath, lead guitarist for Cage the Elephant
- Nick Berg, murdered hostage
- Al Bruno, gridiron football player, administrator, and coach
- Stephen Dennis (born 1987), basketball player for Bnei Herzliya of the Israeli Basketball Premier League
- Shante Evans, Professional Basketball Player of the Artego Bydgoszcz and Slovenian National Team
- Linda and Terry Jamison, the "Psychic Twins"
- Bruce Larkin, children's book author
- Peter Lu, physicist
- Jon Matlack, former Major League Baseball pitcher
- Chas McCormick (born 1995), baseball player, 2022 World Series Champion with the Houston Astros
- William M. McSwain, United States Attorney for the Eastern District of Pennsylvania
- Kyle Morton, professional soccer player for Pittsburgh Riverhounds SC
- Brooke Queenan, former WNBA player
- U.S. Army General David M. Rodriguez, Commander of United States Africa Command
- Bayard Rustin, civil rights activist
- Kerr Smith, actor
- Marian Washington, former Women Basketball Coach at Kansas University
- Jason Wingard, President Temple University
- Zach Zandi, professional soccer player
