= Wilbooks =

- Company type: Public
- Industry: Publishing
- Founded: 1996
- Founder: Bruce Larkin
- Headquarters: West Chester, Pennsylvania, United States
- Products: Educational Publishing
- Website: www.wilbooks.com

Wilbooks is a children’s book educational publishing company based in West Chester, Pennsylvania. The company was founded by children’s book author Bruce Larkin in 1996. The company publishes fiction, non-fiction, humor, and poetry books geared towards children from Pre-kindergarten to third grade. Wilbooks publishes leveled, educational books with a focus on teaching children how to read. In 2009 Wilbooks (through Bruce Larkin) donated over 500,000 books to schools, teachers, and literacy organizations throughout the United States.

Also known as Wilmington Book Source.
