= Rotorfest =

Rotorfest is an all-helicopter airshow held by the American Helicopter Museum. Rotorfest is billed by the museum as the World's Largest All-Helicopter Airshow. The Airshow takes place at the Brandywine Airport in West Chester, Pennsylvania. Aircraft static displays were located on the north side of the airport around the American Helicopter Museum. The first Rotorfest was in 1996.

== Rotorfest 2009 ==
Rotorfest 2009, held in October, had 7,000 visitors in attendance, the two-day event showcased the value and excitement of rotary wing flight. Military and civilian aircraft were featured in flight demonstrations and ground displays while rides were offered throughout the day.

== Rotorfest 2010 ==
RotorFest 2010 is scheduled for 10:00am to 4:30pm. September 25 and 26, 2010

== Rotorfest 2011 ==
RotorFest 2011 is scheduled for September 24 and 25, 2011

== See also ==
- Fly-in
- Flypast
- List of airshows
- List of airshow accidents
