= Westtown Township, Pennsylvania =

Township in Pennsylvania, US

Westtown Township
- Township
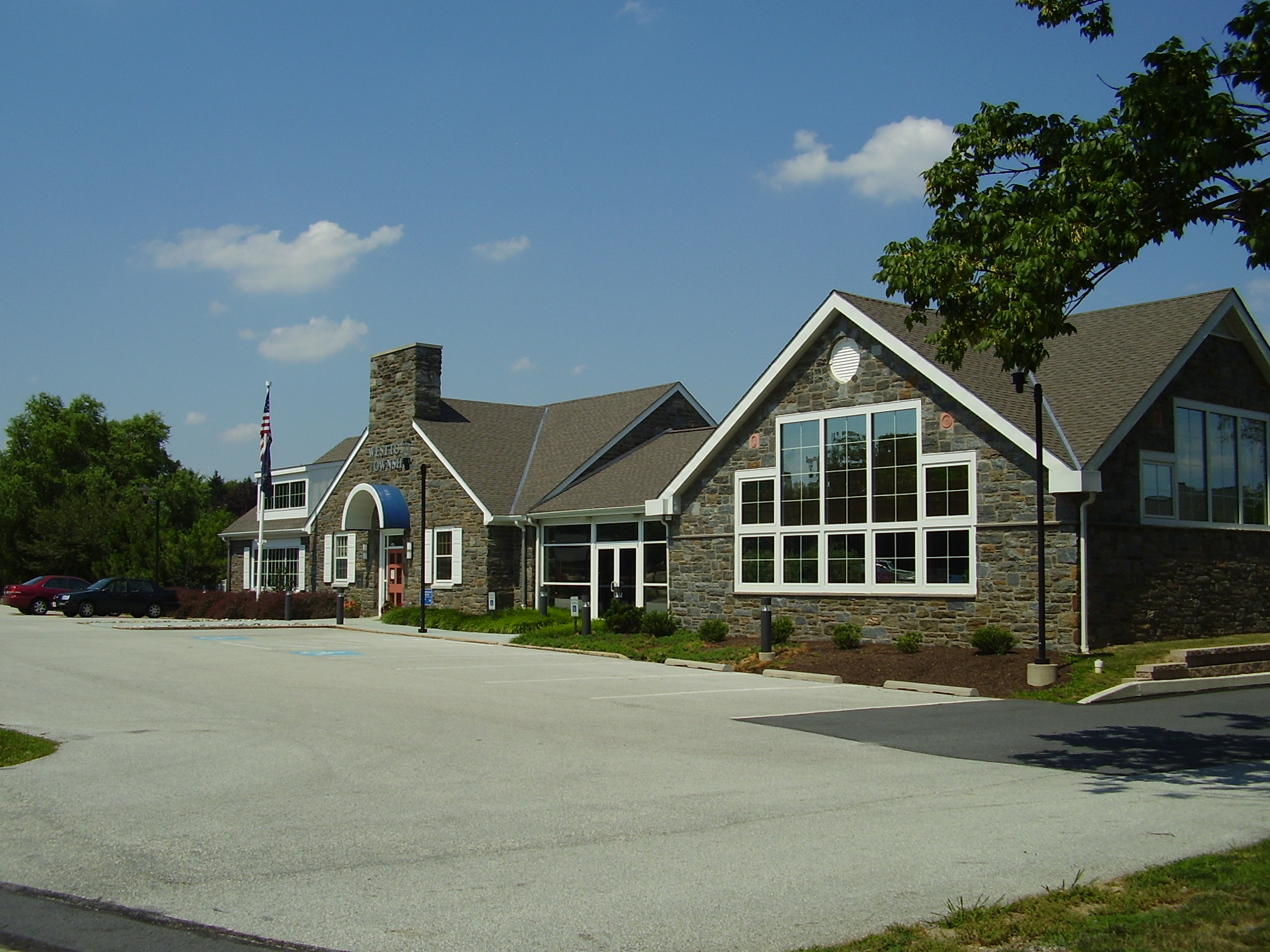
- The main building of Westtown Township

- Location in Chester County and the state of Pennsylvania.

- Location of Pennsylvania in the United States
- Coordinates: 39°57′02″N 75°32′51″W
- Country: United States
- State: Pennsylvania
- County: Chester

Area
  - Total: 8.74 sq mi (22.63 km^{2})
  - Land: 8.66 sq mi (22.44 km^{2})
  - Water: 0.073 sq mi (0.19 km^{2})
- Elevation: 269 ft (82 m)

Population (2010)
  - Total: 10,827
  - Estimate (2016): 10,865
  - Density: 1,254/sq mi (484.2/km^{2})
- Time zone: UTC-5 (EST)
  - Summer (DST): UTC-4 (EDT)
- Area code: 610
- FIPS code: 42-029-84104
- Website: http://www.westtownpa.org

Westtown Township is a township in Chester County, Pennsylvania, United States. The population was 10,827 at the 2010 census.

== History ==
County Bridge No. 148 was listed on the National Register of Historic Places in 1988.

== Geography ==
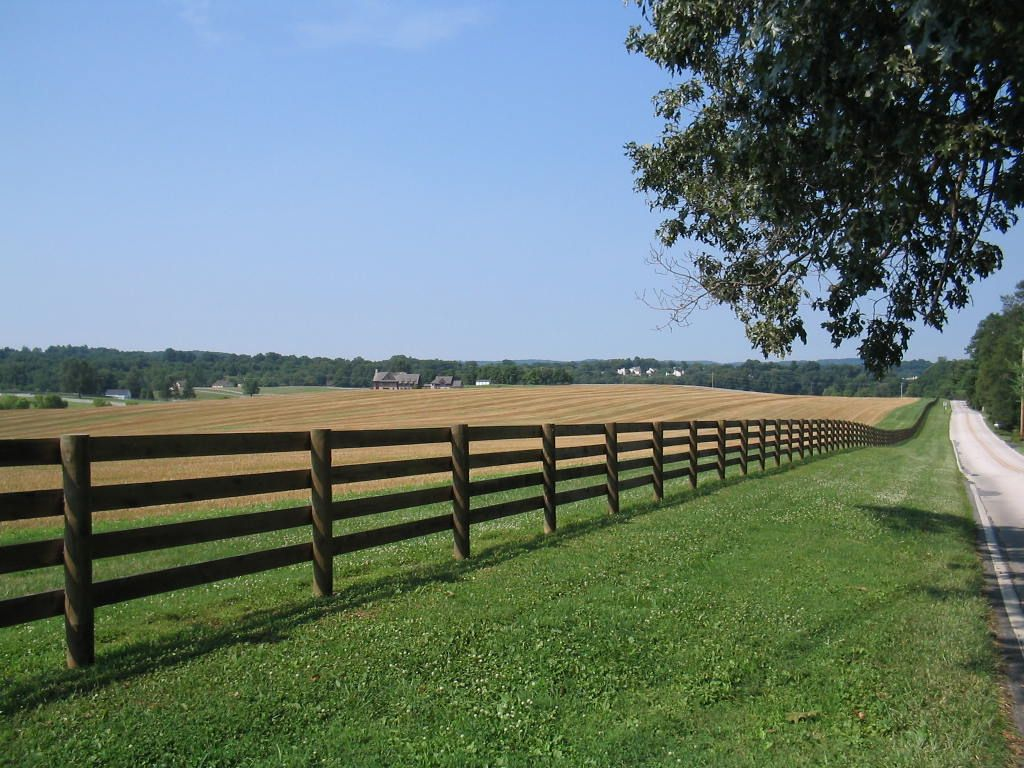
A large farm in Westtown Township, July 2004

According to the United States Census Bureau, the township has a total area of 8.8 square miles (23 km^{2}), of which 8.7 square miles (23 km^{2}) is land and 0.04 square miles (0.10 km^{2}), or 0.23%, is water.

== Demographics ==
Historical population
Census	Pop.	Note	%±
1930	785		—
1940	912		16.2%
1950	994		9.0%
1960	1,947		95.9%
1970	5,069		160.3%
1980	6,774		33.6%
1990	9,937		46.7%
2000	10,352		4.2%
2010	10,827		4.6%
2020	11,154		3.0%

As of the census of 2000, there were 10,352 people, 3,705 households, and 2,949 families residing in the township. The population density was 1,185.5 inhabitants per square mile (457.7/km^{2}). There were 3,795 housing units at an average density of 434.6 per square mile (167.8/km^{2}). The racial makeup of the township was 93.97% White, 2.59% African American, 0.07% Native American, 2.42% Asian, 0.01% Pacific Islander, 0.37% from other races, and 0.57% from two or more races. Hispanic or Latino of any race were 1.13% of the population.

There were 3,705 households, out of which 38.7% had children under the age of 18 living with them, 70.6% were married couples living together, 6.9% had a female householder with no husband present, and 20.4% were non-families. 16.0% of all households were made up of individuals, and 4.0% had someone living alone who was 65 years of age or older. The average household size was 2.78 and the average family size was 3.14.

In the township the population was spread out, with 26.9% under the age of 18, 6.0% from 18 to 24, 28.9% from 25 to 44, 28.2% from 45 to 64, and 9.9% who were 65 years of age or older. The median age was 39 years. For every 100 females, there were 96.0 males. For every 100 females age 18 and over, there were 93.1 males.

The median income for a household in the township was $85,049, and the median income for a family was $96,318. Males had a median income of $66,675 versus $43,482 for females. The per capita income for the township was $36,894. About 2.1% of families and 3.0% of the population were below the poverty line, including 1.7% of those under age 18 and 3.5% of those age 65 or over.

== Political representation ==
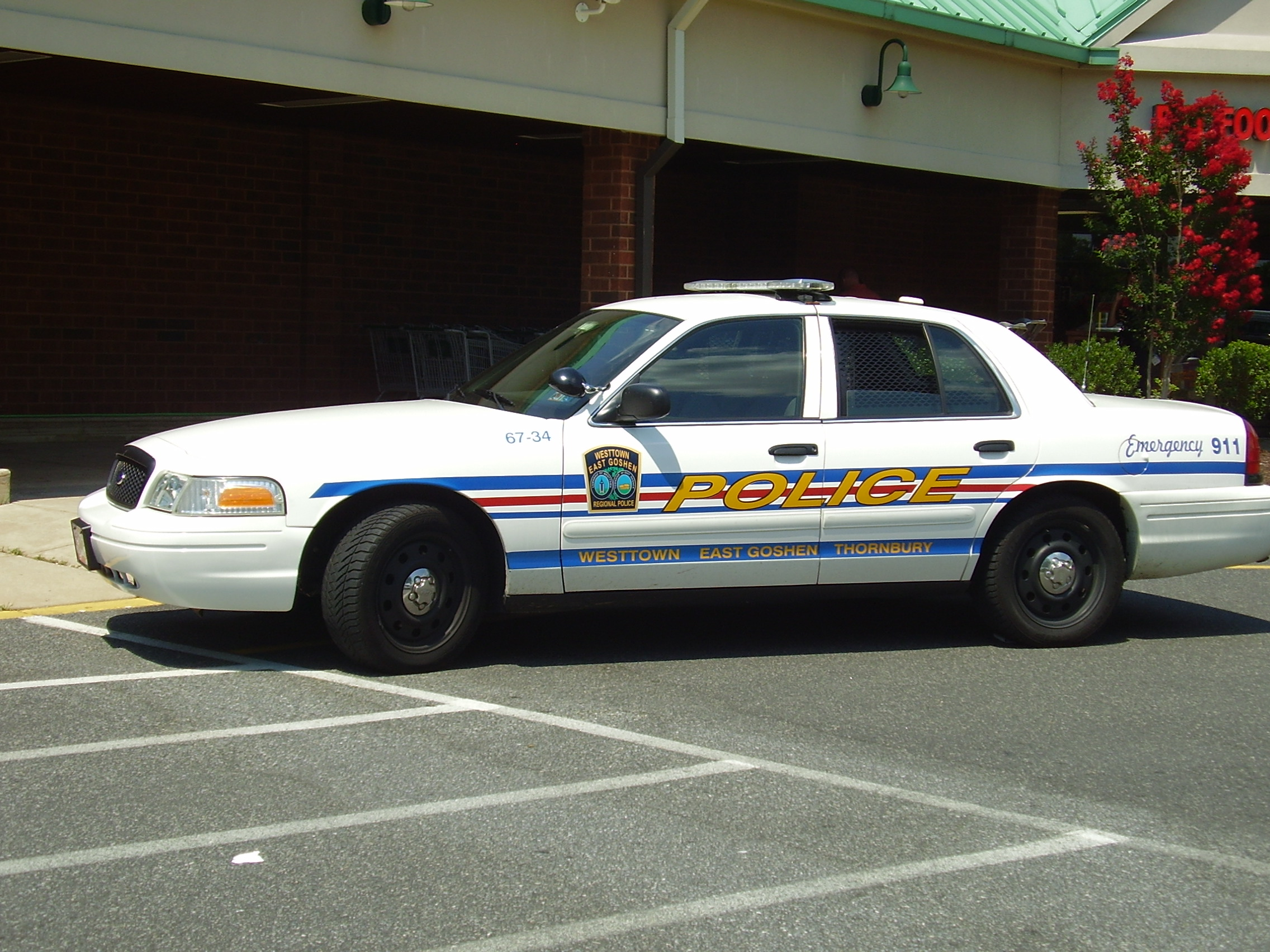
A police car of the Westtown-East Goshen Regional Police Department, serving Westtown Township, East Goshen Township, and Thornbury Township

Westtown Township is represented by State Representative, Chris Pielli – 156th District and State Senator, Carolyn Comitta – 9th District. In the U.S. House of Representatives, Representative Chrissy Houlahan, 6th District and U.S. Senators John Fetterman and Dave McCormick.

== Township officials ==
Westtown Township is governed by a three-member board of supervisors. Under the supervision of the board the township has many arms of government, including the Township's Planning Commission, Historical Commission, Parks & Recreation Commission, and the Zoning Hearing Board.

Township Board of Supervisors members 2020:

- Richard Pomerantz, Chair
- Carol R. DeWolf, Vice Chair
- Scott Yaw, Police Commissioner
- VACANT - Township Manager

== Transportation ==
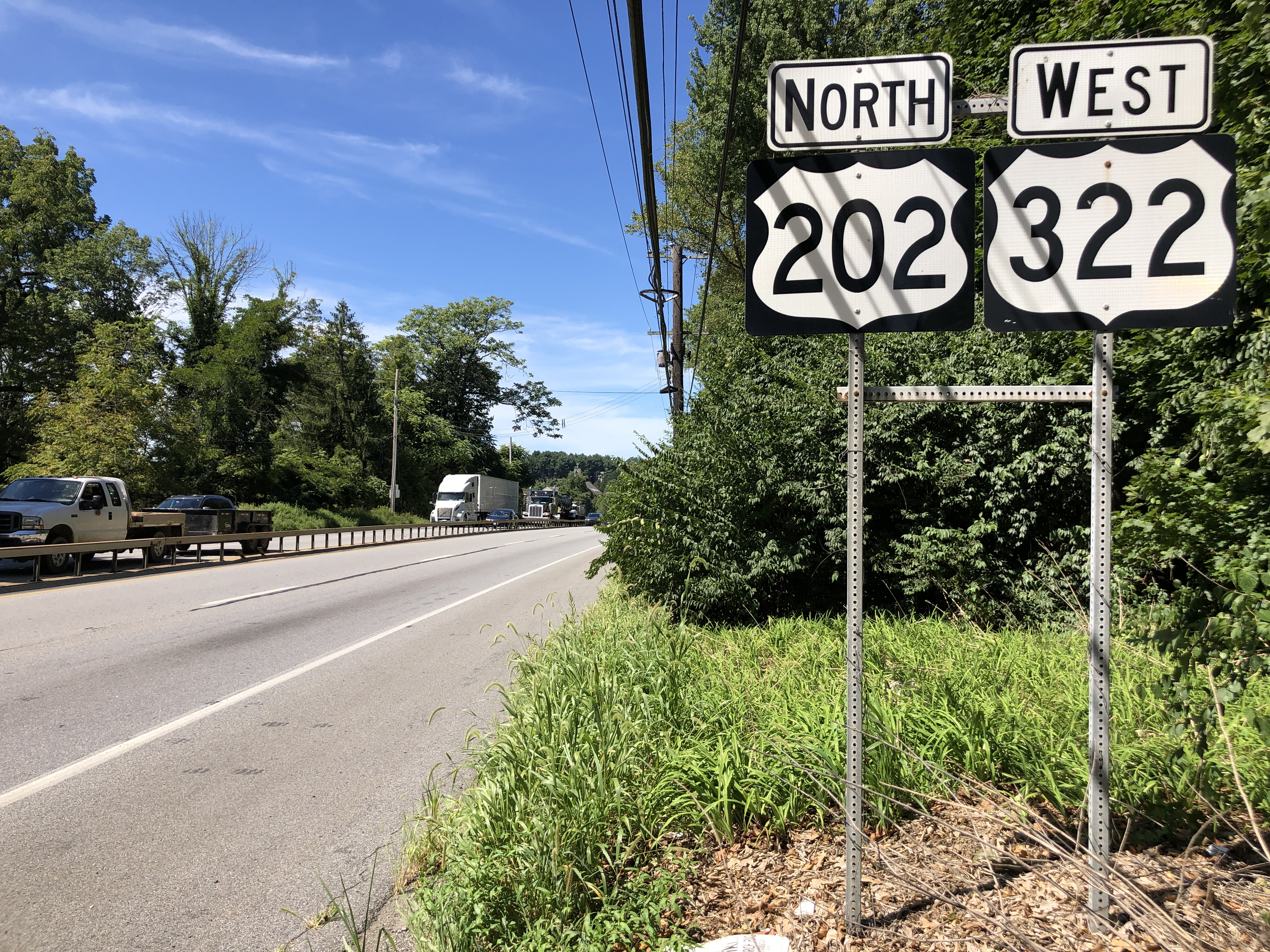
US 202 northbound and US 322 westbound in Westtown Township

As of 2022, there were 65.76 miles (105.83 km) of public roads in Westtown Township, of which 10.89 miles (17.53 km) were maintained by the Pennsylvania Department of Transportation (PennDOT) and 54.87 miles (88.30 km) were maintained by the township.

Numbered roads serving Westtown Township include U.S. Route 202/U.S. Route 322, Pennsylvania Route 3, Pennsylvania Route 352 and Pennsylvania Route 926. US 202/US 322 follow Wilmington Pike along a northwest-southeast alignment across the southwestern portion of the township. PA 3 follows West Chester Pike along an east-west alignment across the northern corner of the township. PA 352 follows Chester Road along a northwest-southeast alignment across the northeastern portion of the township. Finally, PA 926 follows Street Road along a northeast-southwest alignment along the southeastern edge of the township.

== Education ==
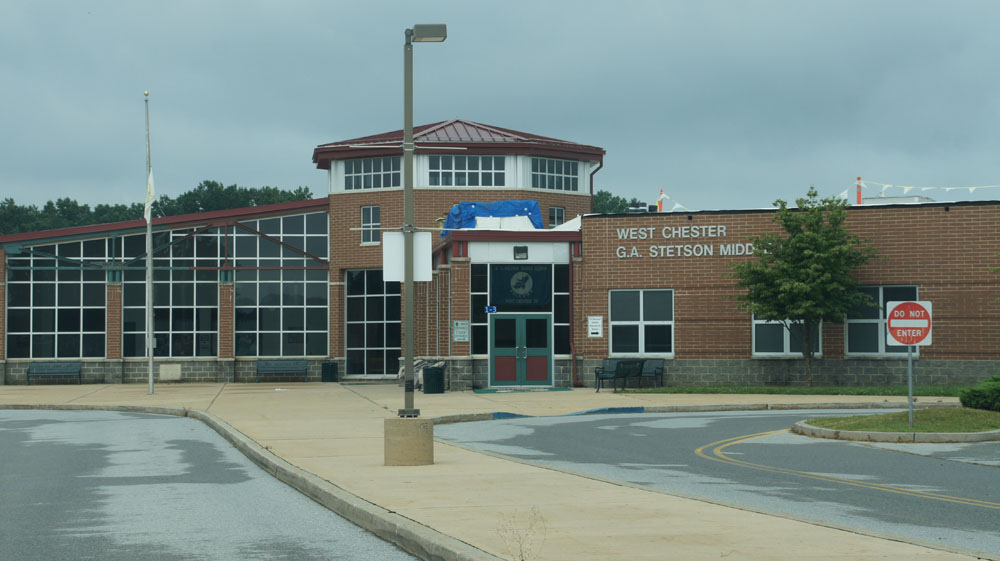
Stetson Middle School

West Chester Area School District serves the township. Elementary schools serving sections include Penn Wood, Sarah Starkweather, Westtown-Thornbury, and Glen Acres. Almost all residents are zoned to Stetson Middle School and West Chester Rustin High School, while the far northern portion of the township is zoned to Fugett Middle School and West Chester East High School.

Other schools in the township include Westtown School, an independent school for grades pre-K through 12; the St. Maximilian Kolbe Parish School, and the Ss. Simon and Jude Parish School, Catholic schools for grades pre-K through 8; and the Concept School, a private school for grades 5 through 12.
