= West Whiteland Inn =

- U.S. National Register of Historic Places
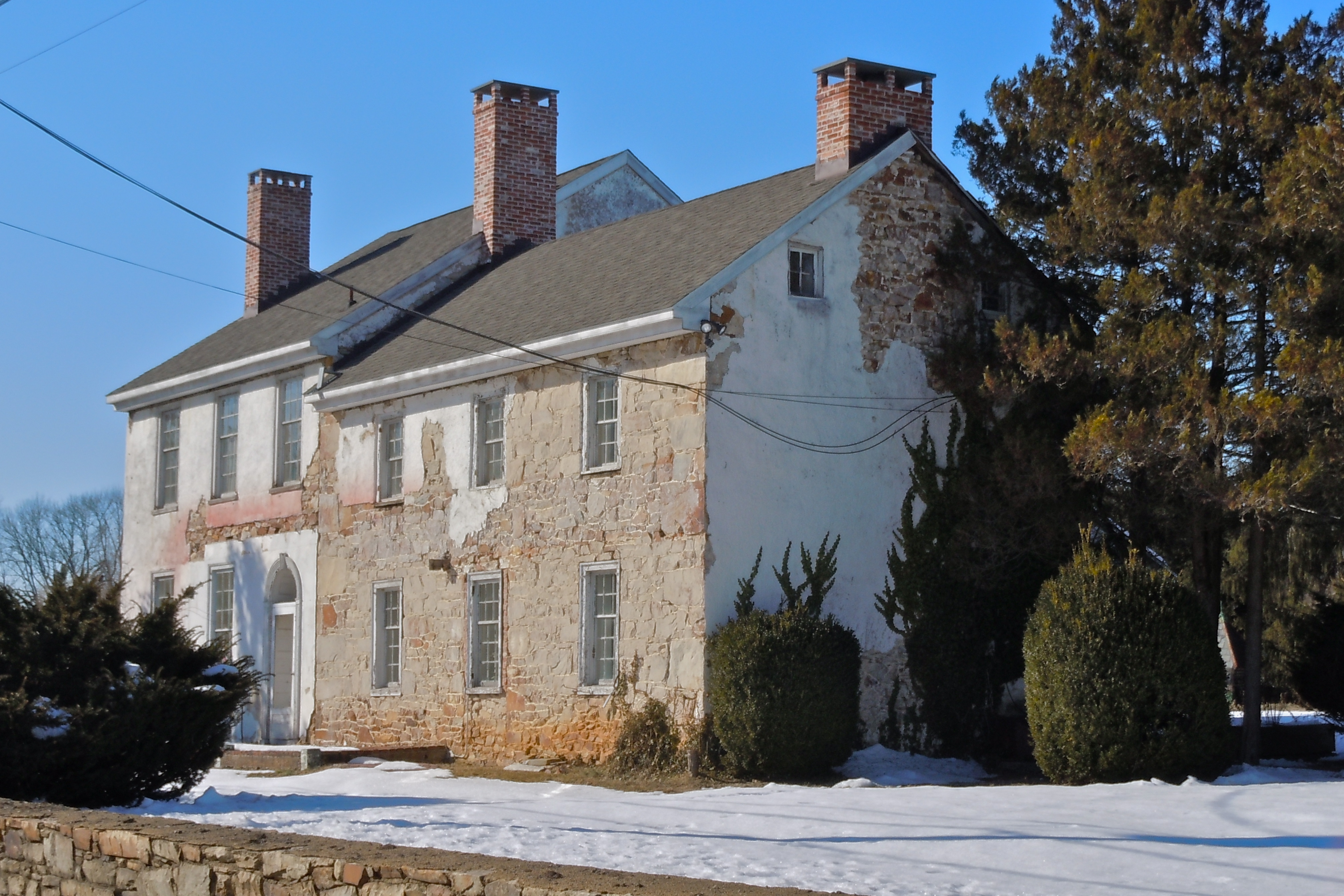
- West Whiteland Inn, February 2011

- Location within Pennsylvania Location within the United States
- Location: 609 W. Lincoln Hwy., West Whiteland Township, Pennsylvania
- Coordinates: 40°1′21″N 75°39′42″W
- Area: 2.8 acres (1.1 ha)
- Built: c. 1825
- Architectural style: Colonial, Georgian
- MPS: West Whiteland Township MRA
- NRHP reference No.: 84003313
- Added to NRHP: August 2, 1984

The West Whiteland Inn is an historic inn and tavern in West Whiteland Township, Chester County, Pennsylvania, United States.

It was listed on the National Register of Historic Places in 1984.

== History and architectural features ==
This historic inn was built in two sections. The older section dates to the eighteenth century and is a two-story, three-bay, single-pile, stone structure. Sometime around 1825, it was enlarged with a 2 1/2-story, double-pile Georgian-style stone addition. Also located on the property is a contributing former stone stable.
