= West Goshen Township, Pennsylvania =

Township in Pennsylvania, US

West Goshen Township
- Township
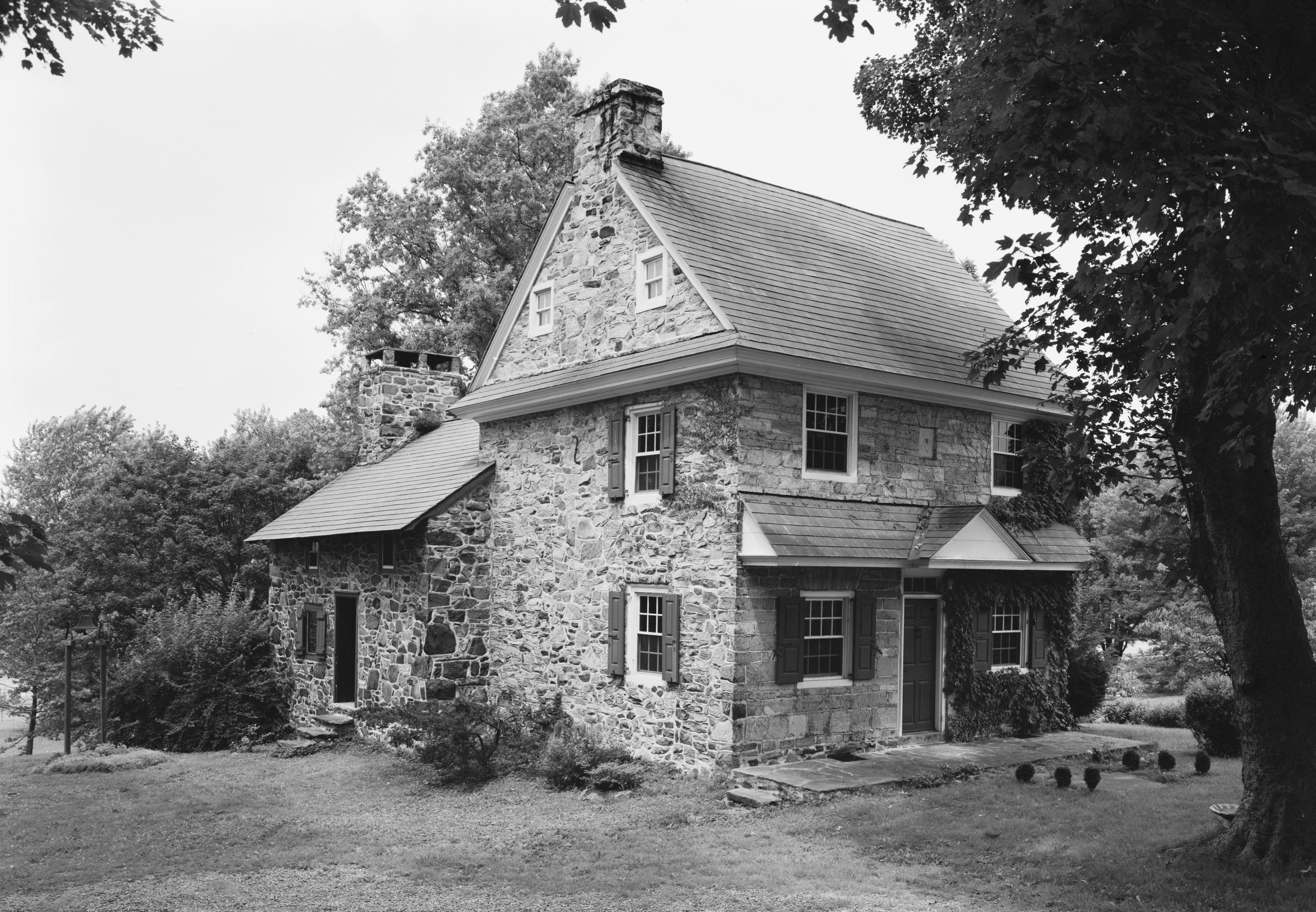
- Collins Mansion

- Flag Seal

- Location in Chester County, Pennsylvania

- Location of Pennsylvania in the United States
- Coordinates: 39°58′21″N 75°34′58″W
- Country: United States
- State: Pennsylvania
- County: Chester
- Founded: 1681

Area
  - Total: 12.00 sq mi (31.08 km^{2})
  - Land: 11.85 sq mi (30.70 km^{2})
  - Water: 0.15 sq mi (0.38 km^{2})
- Elevation: 469 ft (143 m)

Population (2020)
  - Total: 23,040
  - Density: 1,943.7/sq mi (750.48/km^{2})
- Time zone: UTC-5 (EST)
  - Summer (DST): UTC-4 (EDT)
- Postal code: 19380
- FIPS code: 42-029-83080
- Website: www.westgoshen.org

West Goshen Township is a township in Chester County, Pennsylvania, United States. The population was 23,040 at the 2020 census. The headquarters for QVC is in West Goshen Township. There are more than 465 businesses that call West Goshen Township home.

== History ==
The lands of Goshen were purchased in 1681 from William Penn as part of the Welsh tract of Westtown. By 1704, Goshen and Westtown had become separate townships. In 1788, the formation of the borough of West Chester reduced the size of Goshen. Finally, in 1817, the township was divided into East and West Goshen townships. At the time of the 1820 census, West Goshen's population numbered 757. West Goshen was primarily a farming community in its early history.

Before long, many different businesses began to appear, including several women-owned enterprises. Trades such as cabinet-making, tailoring, weaving, clock-making, and wool-making characterized the area. The completion of railroads in the 1830s and 1850s facilitated the delivery of goods and services to the Township, and marked the migration of many Philadelphians seeking country residences.

By 1930, West Goshen's population had risen to 1,958. The farming community had grown into a suburban neighborhood. In 1950, the population was 3,500. The Township experienced its most explosive growth during the 1960s and 1970s, and today can boast over 20,000 residents and a balanced mix of residential, business, office, retail, and industrial uses.

== Geography ==
According to the United States Census Bureau, the township has a total area of 12.0 square miles (31.2 km^{2}), of which 11.9 square miles (30.9 km^{2}) is land and 0.1 square mile (0.3 km^{2}) (0.91%) is water.

== Demographics ==
Historical population
Census	Pop.	Note	%±
1930	1,958		—
1940	2,456		25.4%
1950	3,542		44.2%
1960	8,214		131.9%
1970	12,858		56.5%
1980	16,164		25.7%
1990	18,082		11.9%
2000	20,495		13.3%
2010	21,866		6.7%
2020	23,040		5.4%

As of the 2010 census, the township was 88.8% White, 3.7% Black or African American, 0.2% Native American, 4.7% Asian, and 1.4% were two or more races. 3.7% of the population were of Hispanic or Latino ancestry.

As of the census of 2000, there were 20,495 people, 7,554 households, and 5,484 families residing in the township. The population density was 1,719.6 inhabitants per square mile (663.9/km^{2}). There were 7,703 housing units at an average density of 646.3 per square mile (249.5/km^{2}). The racial makeup of the township was 90.51% White, 4.25% African American, 0.04% Native American, 3.78% Asian, 0.01% Pacific Islander, 0.65% from other races, and 0.76% from two or more races. Hispanic or Latino of any race were 2.00% of the population.

There were 7,554 households, out of which 36.5% had children under the age of 18 living with them, 63.0% were married couples living together, 7.0% had a female householder with no husband present, and 27.4% were non-families. 21.0% of all households were made up of individuals, and 6.4% had someone living alone who was 65 years of age or older. The average household size was 2.68 and the average family size was 3.18.

In the township the population was spread out, with 26.3% under the age of 18, 6.9% from 18 to 24, 32.2% from 25 to 44, 23.8% from 45 to 64, and 10.8% who were 65 years of age or older. The median age was 37 years. For every 100 females, there were 97.2 males. For every 100 females age 18 and over, there were 94.7 males.

The median income for a household in the township was $71,055, and the median income for a family was $84,574 (these figures had risen to $85,807 and $102,356 respectively as of a 2007 estimate). Males had a median income of $51,676 versus $36,783 for females. The per capita income for the township was $32,487. About 1.5% of families and 3.4% of the population were below the poverty line, including 3.1% of those under age 18 and 2.5% of those age 65 or over.

== Parks and recreation ==
The Township has four main parks:

Barker Park is located on Falcon Lane near Westtown Road. It is equipped with a pavilion with 10-12 tables, two charcoal grills, and four electrical outlets on the posts of the pavilion. There is a backstop for Tee-ball or wiffle ball as well as playground equipment.

Coopersmith Park is located off Spring Lane. It is equipped with a pavilion with 12 picnic tables, five charcoal grills, and two electrical outlets. There is a backstop for Tee ball or wiffle ball, a grass volleyball court (bring your own net and ball), an exercise trail, playground equipment and a horseshoe pit (bring your own horseshoes).

Lambert Park is located on Pottstown Pike near the intersection with Greenhill Road. It contains playground equipment, two tennis courts, a skateboard park, and a 2/3 acres dog park "Roonie's Canine Corner." The park is adjacent to athletic fields owned by the West Chester Area School districts, but which are contractually managed through West Goshen Township. Lambert Park is home to West Goshen's Summer teen program for children 13 through 15 years old.

West Goshen Community Park is located at the intersection of Fern Hill and North Five Points Roads near Ice Line. It is equipped with an amphitheater and adjacent picnic pavilion with eight picnic tables, five outlets, and four charcoal grills. The Community Park is equipped with two basketball courts, one softball field, one Little League baseball field, adult hardball field, four tennis courts, and two sand volleyball courts. There is a playground, a concession stand, and a paved walking path of .8 mile circles the park.

== Economy ==
QVC has its headquarters in West Goshen Township, in QVC Studio Park, 1200 Wilson Drive. West Goshen Township is home to five new car dealerships, Brandywine Airport, a skating rink, Animas (a Division of Johnson & Johnson), a health club, and many of the West Chester University buildings.

== Transportation ==
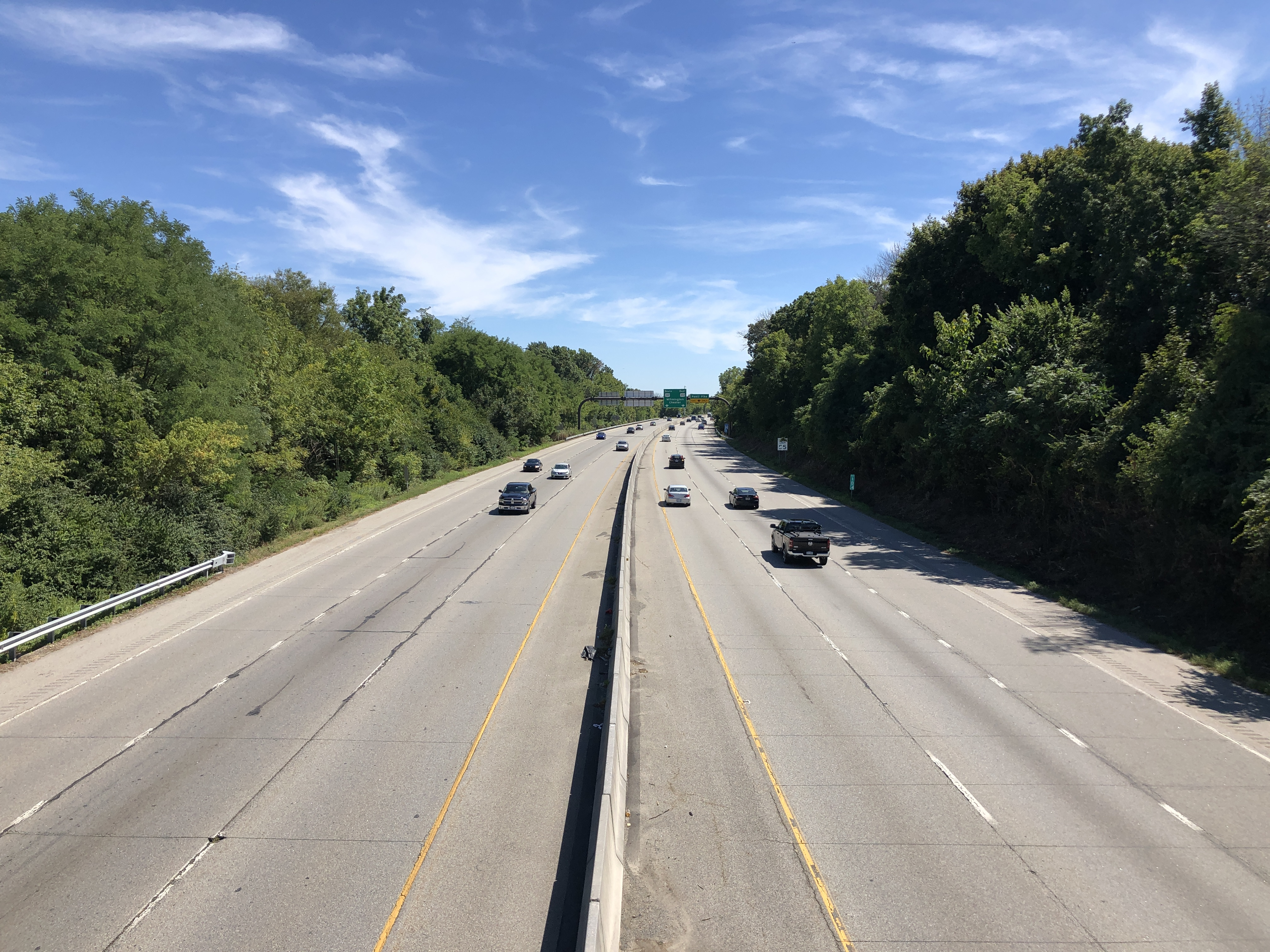
US 202 southbound and US 322 eastbound in West Goshen Township

As of 2022, there were 121.11 miles (194.91 km) of public roads in West Goshen Township, of which 28.50 miles (45.87 km) were maintained by the Pennsylvania Department of Transportation (PennDOT) and 92.61 miles (149.04 km) were maintained by the township.

US Route 202 runs north-south through the township, heading toward King of Prussia in the north and Wilmington in the south. US Route 322 comes from Downingtown and merges with Route 202. PA Route 3 enters the township from Philadelphia in the east and splits into Gay Street and Market Street as it enters the West Chester Borough. PA 100 also starts in the northern portion of the township.

SEPTA provides frequent bus service through West Goshen Township via Route 92, which runs between the West Chester Transportation Center and King of Prussia, Route 104, which runs between West Chester University and the 69th Street Transportation Center, and Route 135, which runs between the West Chester Transportation Center and Coatesville.

Brandywine Airport is in West Goshen.

== Education ==
West Goshen is located in the West Chester Area School District. East High School, Fugett and Pierce Middle Schools, Fern Hill and Glen Acres Elementary Schools and playing fields of Henderson High School are located in West Goshen Township.

Elementary schools serving sections of West Goshen township include East Bradford, East Goshen, Exton, Fern Hill, Glen Acres, Hillsdale Mary C. Howse, Sarah Starkweather, and Westtown-Thornbury.

All of the secondary schools operated by the district serve sections of West Goshen township; sections are zoned to J.R. Fugett Middle School and West Chester East High School, E.N. Peirce Middle School and Henderson High School, and G.A. Stetson Middle School and Rustin High School.

West Chester University is partially located in West Goshen Township, as sections of the North and South campuses are within the township limits.

== Notable persons ==
- Edward Jackson, ophthalmologist
- Horace Pippin, artist (1888–1946)
