= West Chester Area School District =

School district in Pennsylvania, United States

- Monogram logo Seal

Address
- 782 Springdale Drive Exton, Pennsylvania, 19341; United States

District information
- Type: Public
- Grades: K–12
- NCES District ID: 4225290

Students and staff
- Students: 12,095 (2021–2022)
- Teachers: 913.33 (on an FTE basis)
- Staff: 468.00 (on an FTE basis)
- Student–teacher ratio: 13.24:1

Other information
- Website: www.wcasd.net

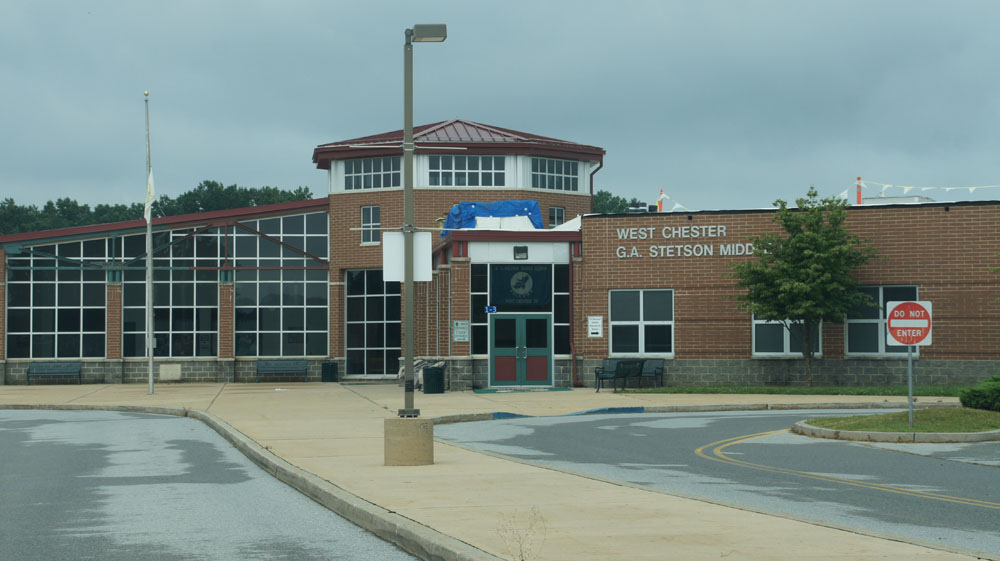
Stetson Middle School, part of the West Chester Area School District

The West Chester Area School District (WCASD) serves the borough of West Chester, Pennsylvania, United States and its surrounding townships. The townships served are East Bradford, East Goshen, Thornbury, West Goshen, West Whiteland, and Westtown, in Chester County, as well as Thornbury Township in adjacent Delaware County. The WCASD consists of eleven elementary schools, three middle schools, and three high schools, as of the fall 2022 school year. Elementary schools include grades 1-5, middle schools grades 6-8, and high schools grades 9-12.

Its headquarters are in West Whiteland Township, near the Exton census-designated place.

== Background ==
Almost 12,000 students from kindergarten through 12th grade attend schools in the WCASD. The class size average is more than 25 students. Over 900 teachers are employed by the WCASD, with 64 percent holding at least a master's degree. For the 2021–2022 school year, the district had a $279.5 million budget.

== Awards and recognition ==
At Henderson High school, the Promethean torchlight award was given to a chemistry teacher, Sam M. This grant was awarded to only ten classrooms in the entire United States of America. This grant provides the classroom with many state-of-the-art equipment features, including the ActivWand, Expressions, and other technology.

For the third consecutive year, the West Chester Area School District has received the top rating of "Gold Medal District" by Expansion Management Magazine in its annual Education Quotient issue.

This year's rating places the school district among the top 17 percent of all public secondary school districts in the United States with an enrollment of at least 3,300 students. Those districts—totaling 10 and serving a population of more than 0 million students—were included in an extensive study conducted by the magazine.

== Elementary schools ==
The West Chester Area School District includes the following elementary schools:

- East Bradford Elementary
- East Goshen Elementary
- Exton Elementary
- Fern Hill Elementary
- Glen Acres Elementary
- Hillsdale Elementary
- Mary C. Howse Elementary
- Penn Wood Elementary
- Sarah Starkweather Elementary
- Westtown-Thornbury Elementary
- Greystone Elementary

== Secondary schools ==
The West Chester Area School District includes the following secondary schools:

- Fugett Middle School
- Peirce Middle School
- Stetson Middle School
- Henderson High School
- East High School
- Rustin High School
