= N99 motorway (Netherlands) =

Highway in the Netherlands

N99 or rijksweg 99 is a freeway in the province of North Holland in the Netherlands. It connects Den Oever with Den Helder.
