= West Whiteland Township, Pennsylvania =

Township in Pennsylvania, US

West Whiteland Township
- Township
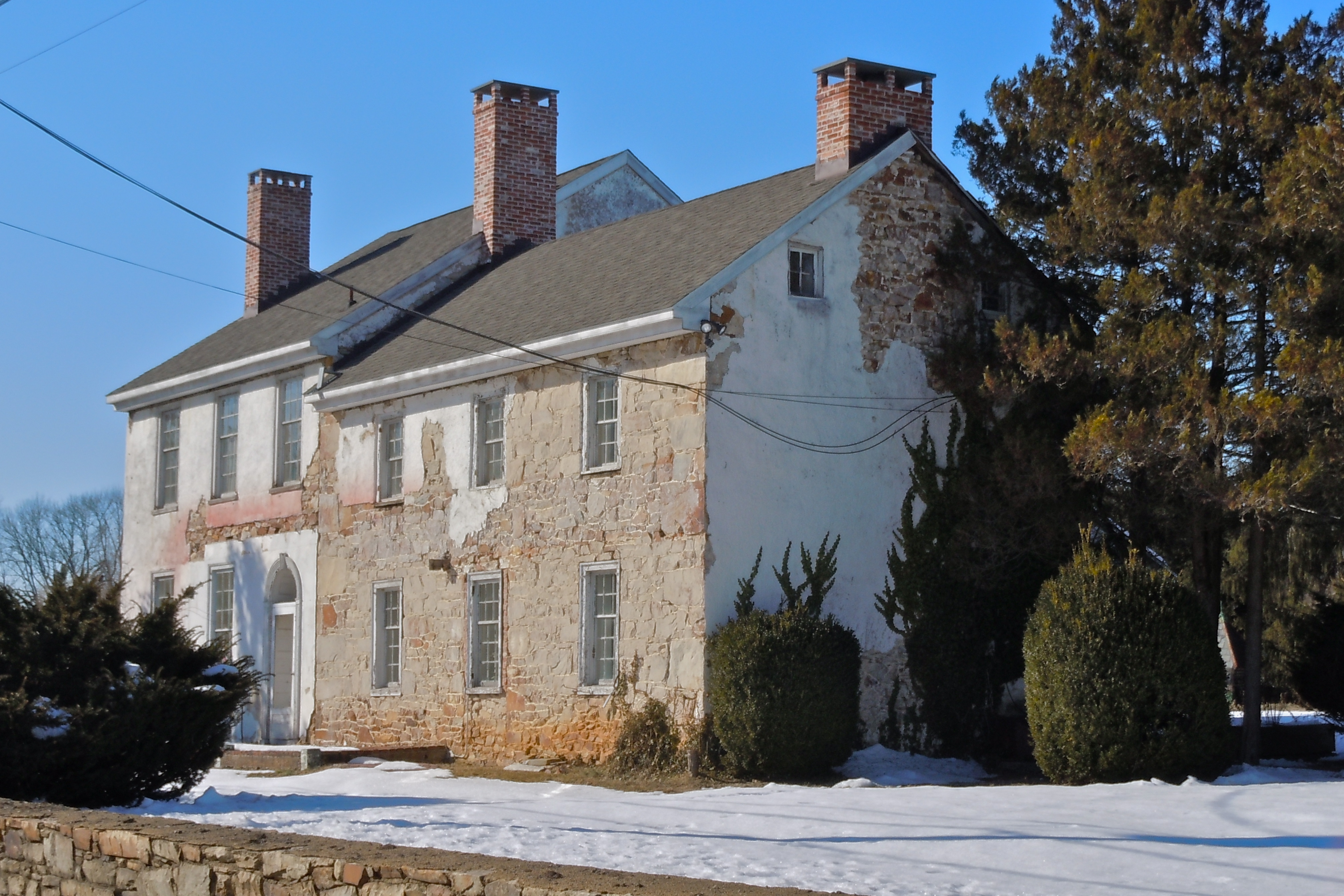
- The West Whiteland Inn
- Nickname: The Crossroads of Chester County
- Motto: "Pride in Our Past. Pride in Our Progress."
- Location in Chester County and the state of Pennsylvania.

- Location of Pennsylvania in the United States
- Coordinates: 39°59′45″N 75°37′59″W
- Country: United States
- State: Pennsylvania
- County: Chester
- Named for: Whitland

Area
  - Total: 12.92 sq mi (33.47 km^{2})
  - Land: 12.83 sq mi (33.24 km^{2})
  - Water: 0.089 sq mi (0.23 km^{2})
- Elevation: 394 ft (120 m)

Population (2020)
  - Total: 19,632
  - Density: 1,519.2/sq mi (586.55/km^{2})
- Time zone: UTC-5 (EST)
  - Summer (DST): UTC-4 (EDT)
- Area code: 610
- FIPS code: 42-029-84192
- Website: www.westwhiteland.org

West Whiteland Township is a township in Chester County, Pennsylvania, United States. The population was 19,632 at the 2020 census.

== Geography ==
According to the United States Census Bureau, the township has a total area of 13.0 square miles (34 km^{2}), of which 0.04 square miles (0.10 km^{2}), or 0.15%, is water. It contains the census-designated place in Exton.

== Demographics ==
Historical population
Census	Pop.	Note	%±
1930	928		—
1940	1,078		16.2%
1950	1,573		45.9%
1960	4,412		180.5%
1970	7,149		62.0%
1980	9,581		34.0%
1990	12,403		29.5%
2000	16,499		33.0%
2010	18,274		10.8%
2020	19,632		7.4%

At the 2020 census, the township was 71.5% non-Hispanic White, 4.3% Black or African American, 0.2% Native American, 17.0% Asian, 0.02% Hawaiian or Other Pacific Islander, 1.5% "Some other Race," and 5.5% were two or more races. 4.2% of the population were of Hispanic or Latino ancestry.

As of the census of 2000, there were 16,499 people, 6,618 households, and 4,400 families residing in the township. The population density was 1,273.0 inhabitants per square mile (491.5/km^{2}). There were 6,748 housing units at an average density of 520.7/sq mi (201.0/km^{2}). The racial makeup of the township was 89.35% White, 5.38% African American, 0.16% Native American, 3.62% Asian, 0.06% Pacific Islander, 0.48% from other races, and 0.95% from two or more races. Hispanic or Latino of any race were 2.00% of the population.

There were 6,618 households, out of which 32.2% had children under the age of 18 living with them, 56.2% were married couples living together, 7.6% had a female householder with no husband present, and 33.5% were non-families. 26.4% of all households were made up of individuals, and 4.9% had someone living alone who was 65 years of age or older. The average household size was 2.44 and the average family size was 3.00.

In the township the population was spread out, with 25.0% under the age of 18, 6.0% from 18 to 24, 38.1% from 25 to 44, 22.0% from 45 to 64, and 8.8% who were 65 years of age or older. The median age was 35 years. For every 100 females, there were 95.8 males. For every 100 females age 18 and over, there were 93.5 males.

The median income for a household in the township was $71,545, and the median income for a family was $81,868. Males had a median income of $57,334 versus $40,827 for females. The per capita income for the township was $35,031. About 0.8% of families and 2.8% of the population were below the poverty line, including 0.4% of those under age 18 and 4.7% of those age 65 or over.

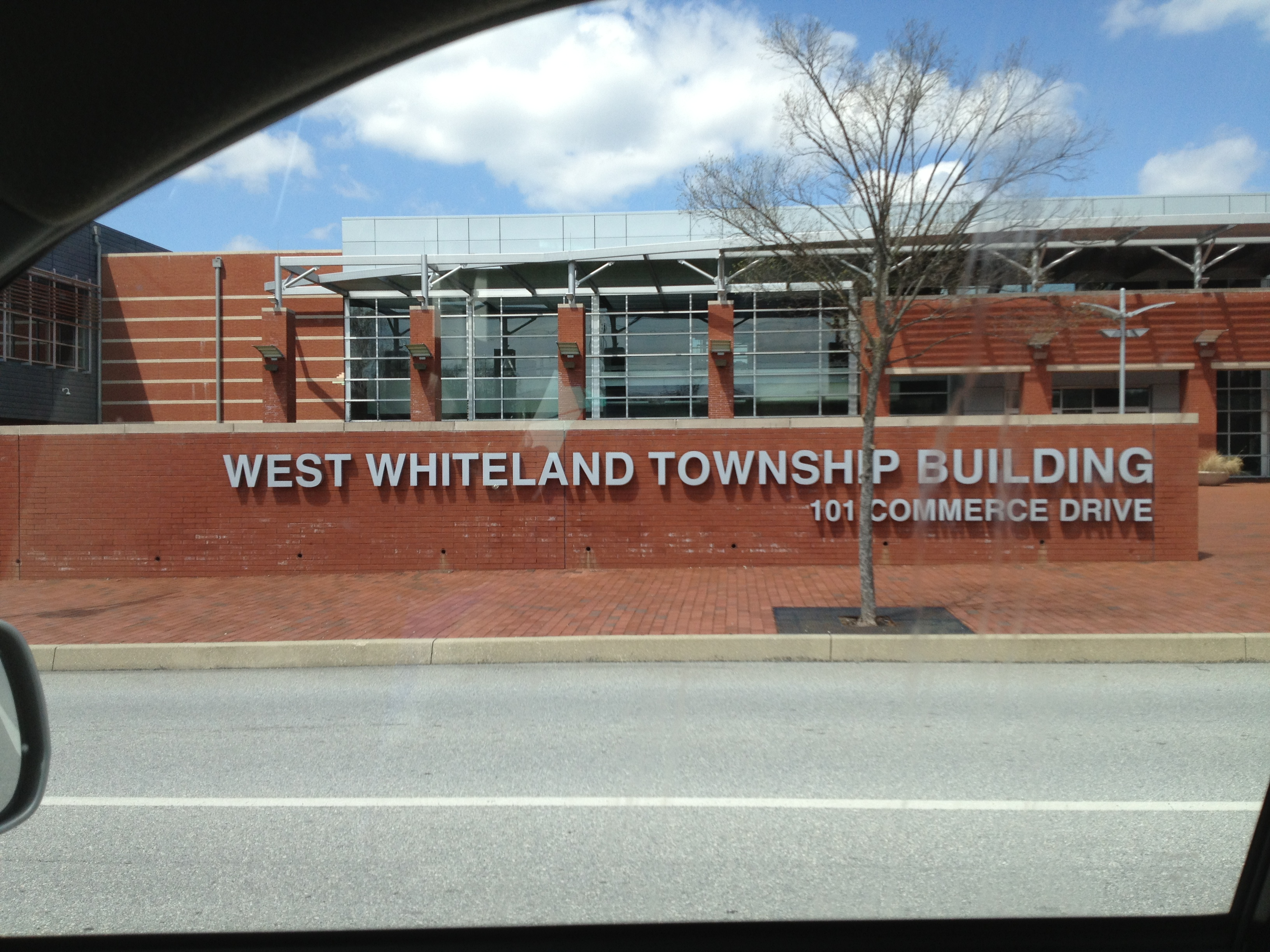
West Whiteland Township Building inside Main Street at Exton complex

== Education ==
West Chester Area School District operates public schools.

Elementary schools serving sections of West Whiteland Township include Exton, Mary C. Howse, East Bradford, East Goshen, and Fern Hill. About half of West Whiteland Township is zoned to Pierce Middle School and West Chester Henderson High School, while the other half is zoned to Fugett Middle School and East High School.

Saints Philip and James School, a Catholic K-8 school of the Roman Catholic Archdiocese of Philadelphia, is in the township.

Chester County Library & District Center, the main library of the Chester County Library System, is in Exton.

== Transportation ==
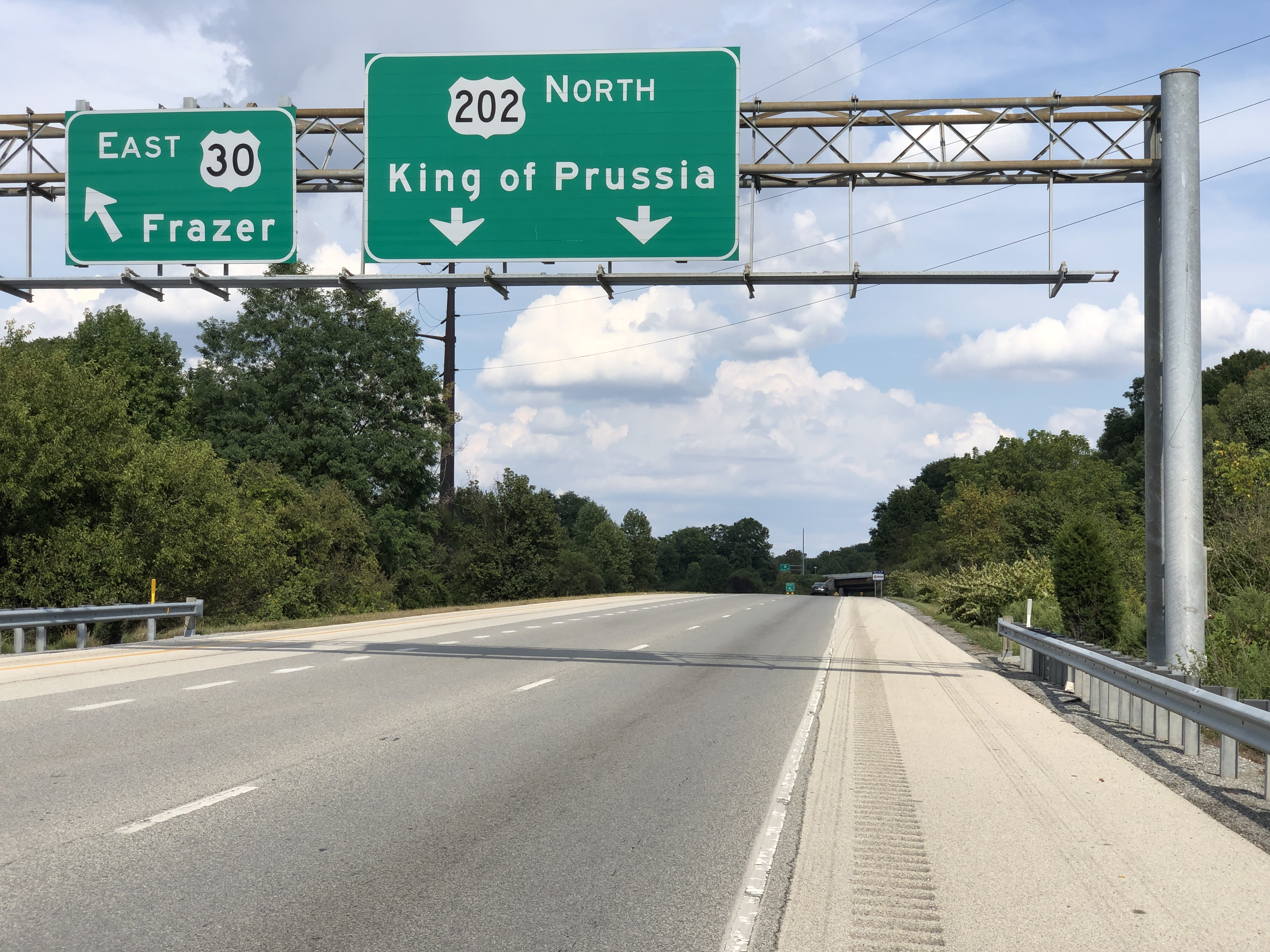
US 30 eastbound approaching US 202 in West Whiteland Township

As of 2021, there were 94.57 miles (152.20 km) of public roads in West Whiteland Township, of which 27.43 miles (44.14 km) were maintained by the Pennsylvania Department of Transportation (PennDOT) and 67.14 miles (108.05 km) were maintained by the township.

U.S. Route 30 and U.S. Route 202 are the main highways serving West Whiteland Township. From their interchange along the east edge of the township, US 202 heads southward along the eastern portion of the township, while US 30 heads westward along the Exton Bypass across the central portion of the township. U.S. Route 30 Business follows the old alignment of US 30 along Lancaster Avenue across the central portion of the township. Finally, Pennsylvania Route 100 follows the Pottstown Pike along a northwest-southeast alignment across the central portion of the township.

== Notable people ==
- Andy Dinniman, State Senator
- James Bowen Everhart, U.S. Representative
- Kyle Lauletta, New Jersey Generals quarterback
- Matt Ryan, NFL quarterback
- Kerr Smith, actor
- Martha Gibbons Thomas, State Representative
- Richard Thomas U.S. Representative, colonel during the American Revolutionary War
- Michael van der Veen, attorney

== See also ==
- Exton, Pennsylvania
