= West Chester Rustin High School =

High school in Pennsylvania

West Chester Bayard Rustin High School

Location
- 1100 Shiloh Road; Westtown Township, Pennsylvania 19382; United States; 39.9380°N 75.5534°W

Information
- Type: High school
- Established: 2006
- Principal: Maggie Hunt
- Staff: 93.21 (FTE)
- Grades: 9–12
- Enrollment: 1,189 (2023-2024)
- Student to teacher ratio: 12.76
- Campus size: 108 acres
- Area: 260,000 sq. ft.
- Colors: Navy, Vegas gold, and white
- Athletics: Pennsylvania Interscholastic Athletic Association
- Mascot: Golden Knight
- Website: Official website

West Chester Bayard Rustin High School is a high school of the West Chester Area School District, in Westtown Township, Chester County, Pennsylvania.

Communities served by West Chester Rustin include sections of Westtown Township, West Chester borough, East Bradford Township, East Goshen Township, Thornbury Township of Chester County, Thornbury Township of Delaware County, and West Goshen Township.

The newest high school in the district, it is named after gay civil rights activist Bayard Rustin, himself a West Chester native. Construction began in 2003 and the school opened in 2006. Rustin was named one of Newsweek's top 500 high schools in America in 2011. As of 2020, Rustin was ranked number 854 in National Rankings and #24 in Pennsylvania schools according to U.S. News & World Report.

== History ==
The West Chester Area School District announced plans to build a new public high school in 2002. In May, the district school board voted 6–3 to name the school after Bayard Rustin, the West Chester-born civil rights leader and principal organizer of the historic 1963 March on Washington, during which Martin Luther King Jr delivered his “I Have a Dream” speech. It chose the name over an alternate option, Maple Shade High School.

However, the board was later forced to reopen discussions after criticism. June Cardosi, one of the board members, opposed Rustin's "un-American" anti-war efforts and brief membership in the Young Communist League. She and others also did not want to name the high school after someone who was openly gay.

A twelve-person committee was formed to investigate; it concluded that "we have not seen, read, or heard anything that would give us reason to change our recommendation". In December 2002, the school board held a second vote, confirming the Bayard Rustin name by the same 6–3 margin.

Designed by Gilbert Architects, construction on Rustin High School began in 2003 and cost $46 million to build. The school opened in September 2006, led by principal Phyllis Simmons.

Following the retirement of Simmons in 2014, Michael Marano was hired to become the high school's new principal.

In 2015, the school district approved the sale of 50 acres of land next to the high school to a housing developer. The land, valued at $5 million, was originally intended for an elementary school that would replace two existing schools, Penn Wood Elementary and Westtown-Thornbury Elementary.

On December 13, 2024, Marano resigned for undisclosed reasons, following a "law enforcement investigation involving the former principal". Cliff Beaver was appointed interim principal for the rest of the school year; the school district appointed Maggie Hunt to be Rustin's new principal on May 1, 2025. The district did not comment on the investigation into Marano, and no charges were ultimately filed.

== Demographics ==
Race/ethnicity as of 2022–2023
Group	No. of students	Percentage
White	970	80.16%
Asian	66	5.45%
Hispanic	70	5.78%
Black	67	5.53%
Two or more races	35	2.89%
Native Hawaiian/Pacific Islander	2	0.16%
American Indian/Alaska Native	0	0%
Total	1,210	100%

Gender as of 2021–2022
Group	No. of students	Percentage
Male	635	52.26%
Female	580	47.74%
Total	1,215	100%

== Academics ==
=== Science Olympiad ===
Rustin's Science Olympiad team started the same year the school opened, 2006–2007, and has made nationals five times, in 2012, 2015, 2016, 2017, and 2019 placing 14th, 18th, 13th, 21st, and 16th respectively.

Rustin also hosts an invitational for middle school teams every year, one of the largest on the east coast.

== Notable alumni ==
- Jack Fritz, sports radio personality
- Anthony Nash, Former NFL player
- Chris McMahon, professional baseball player
