= William Harris (colonist) =

American politician

- Born: 7 October 1757; Willistown Township, Chester County, Province of Pennsylvania, British America
- Died: 4 September 1812 (aged 54); East Whiteland Township, Chester County, Pennsylvania, United States
- Occupation(s): farmer, soldier, state legislator

William Harris (1757–1812) was a farmer, soldier, and member of the Pennsylvania legislature. He was the father of two other American military men.

== Early life ==
William Harris was born October 7, 1757, on his parents' farm in Willistown Township in the Province of Pennsylvania. His father, Thomas Harris (1722–1799), had immigrated from Ireland about 1745. His mother, the former Elizabeth Bailey (1726–1799), also an immigrant from Ireland, was the heir of her childless uncle, Alexander Bailey, owner of the farm. About 1760, the family moved to nearby Grubb's mill, and about 1768, they moved to neighboring East Whiteland Township in the Great Valley of Pennsylvania where, in 1770, Thomas Harris bought a farm just inside the Welsh Tract. This farm was William Harris' home for the rest of his life.

Thomas and Elizabeth Harris had nine children, seven of whom—two sons and five daughters—lived to adulthood. Both sons, William and his older brother John (1753–1838), participated in the American Revolution.

== Military service ==
William Harris joined the Pennsylvania militia at the age of 18, as the Revolutionary War broke out. The first known mention of him appears in a memorandum book of Captain Persifor Frazer in the summer of 1776, which calls him a sergeant. In March 1777 he was appointed a second lieutenant in Captain John Marshall's company of the State Regiment of Foot, Col. John Bull, commander. In time, he rose to the rank of captain. He is listed as captain of the 5th Company, 5th Battalion, of the Pennsylvania Militia for 1777, and of the 4th Company, 4th Battalion for 1780. His regiment was taken into the Pennsylvania Line of the Continental Army, and became the Thirteenth Regiment, which saw action in the battles of the Brandywine and Germantown and several minor engagements. Although records exist showing his involvement in a number of troop movements later in the Revolution, his battalion appears not to have seen any battles in the later years of the war. His name appears on a list of Chester County residents who applied to the government for reparations after the war was over. Harris was involved in the capture of Joseph Doane, a notorious highwayman and member of a family of robbers, in 1782.

Harris again saw service in 1794, when the militia was called upon to suppress the Whiskey Rebellion in western Pennsylvania. He served as captain of the eighth company of the Chester County regiment, and was the regimental paymaster. He continued his involvement with the state military organization for the rest of his life. In 1811, he was commissioned brigadier general of the Second Brigade, Third Division of Pennsylvania troops. When the War of 1812 broke out, Governor Simon Snyder called up 14,000 troops, including Harris, but the new general died before the troops took the field.

== Legislative service ==
Harris was elected to the Pennsylvania General Assembly in 1779, 1780, 1810, and 1811. He served on the committee to arrange the procedures for the election of the state's president and vice-president in 1780. He participated in the last session of the legislature before his death.

== Other activities ==
Although a lifetime farmer, Harris was actively involved in community affairs, and was especially interested in public education. He was instrumental in the founding of the Chester County academy. While in the legislature, he obtained an appropriation to build the school's buildings, and he donated the land on which they were built, which was a part of his farm. He is listed as a member of Masonic Lodge No. 59, founded in East Whiteland in 1790.

He was also an elder of the Great Valley Presbyterian Church, which his family had joined upon leaving St. Peter's Church in the Great Valley during the Revolution because St. Peter's, an Anglican congregation, continued to say prayers for the King, as was required of Anglican clergy. He was buried at Great Valley Presbyterian after his death of a "lingering illness" on September 4, 1812.

== Marriage and children ==
Harris married Mary Campbell (February 27, 1752 – November 26, 1837), daughter of Rev. John Campbell (1713–1753), a Presbyterian minister, and the former Mary Hubbard (and stepdaughter of Richard Richison), on April 24, 1780. William and Mary Harris had seven children:

- Campbell Harris (1781–1853), a farmer. He married Jane Lee and moved to Geneseo, New York.
- Thomas Harris (1784–1861), a physician and surgeon who was chief of the U.S. Navy Bureau of Medicine and Surgery. He married, successively, Jane Hodgdon and Esther White Macpherson.
- Mary Harris (1786–1791).
- John Harris (1789–1864), commandant of the U.S. Marine Corps. He married, successively, Mary Forster and Mary Gilliat Gray.
- William Harris (1792–1861), a physician in Chester County. He married Elizabeth Matilda Patterson.
- James Bailey Harris (1795–1881), a farmer. He moved to the Genesee valley in 1818 with his older brother and married Maria Driesbach.
- Stephen Harris (1798–1851), a physician and farmer. He married Marianne Smith (a granddaughter of Persifor Frazer) and was the father of Joseph Smith Harris.
