= John Harris (USMC officer) =

United States Marine Corps general (1793–1864)

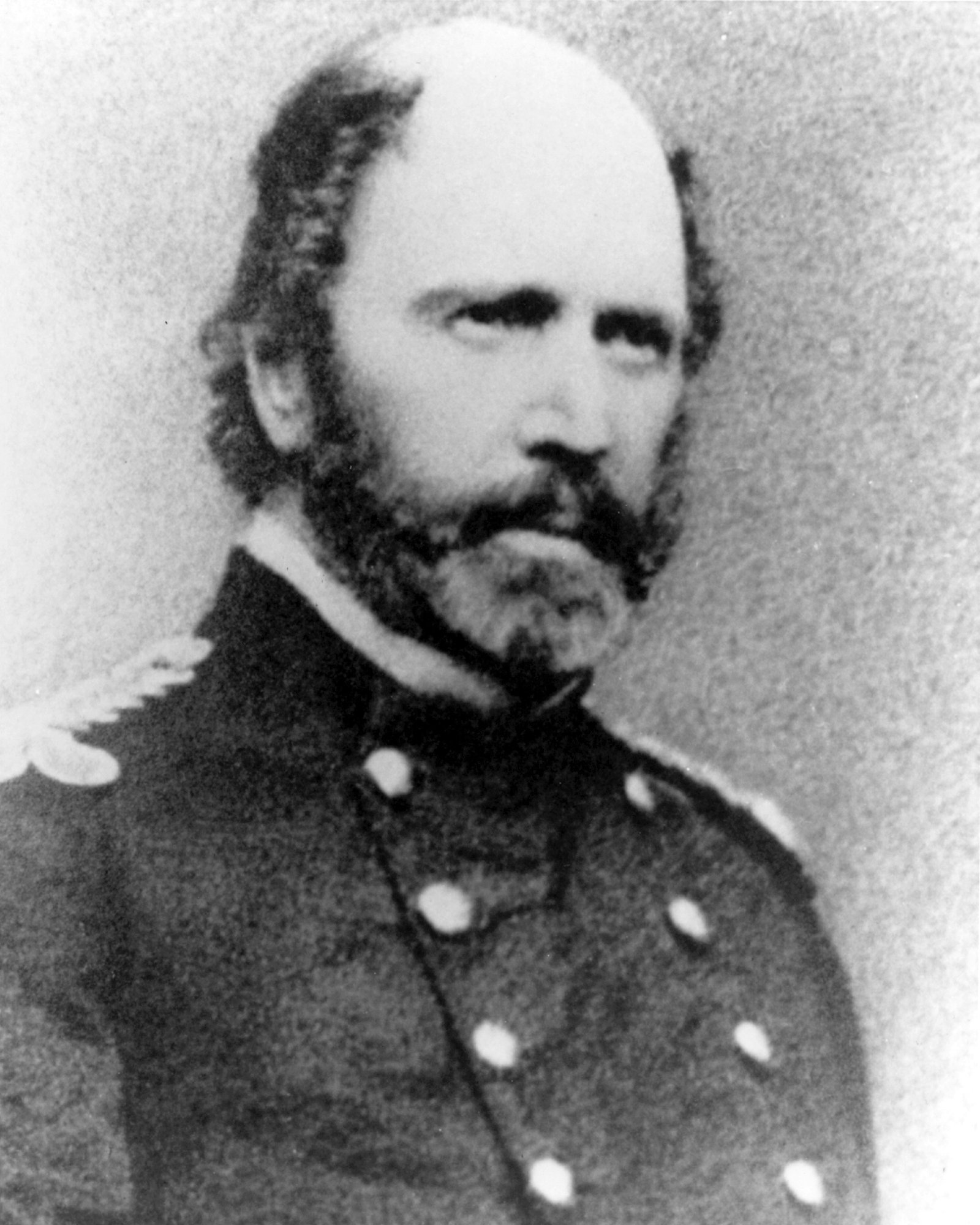
- 6th Commandant of the Marine Corps (1856–1864)
- Born: May 20, 1793; East Whiteland Township, Pennsylvania, U.S.
- Died: May 12, 1864 (aged 70); Washington, D.C., U.S.
- Burial place: Oak Hill Cemetery; Washington, D.C., U.S.
- Military career
- Allegiance: United States of America
- Branch: United States Marine Corps
- Service years: 1814–1864
- Rank: Colonel
- Commands: Commandant of the Marine Corps
- Conflicts: War of 1812; Indian wars; American Civil War

John Harris (May 20, 1793 – May 12, 1864) was the sixth Commandant of the Marine Corps. He served in the Marine Corps for over 50 years, attaining the rank of colonel.

== Early life and family ==
Harris was born in East Whiteland Township, Chester County, Pennsylvania, to an established local family that produced a number of military officers. His father, William Harris, served in the Pennsylvania militia during the American Revolutionary War and Whiskey Rebellion and was commissioned a brigadier general prior to the outbreak of the War of 1812. John's older brother, Thomas, was a naval surgeon who served as Chief of the Navy Bureau of Medicine and Surgery. His brother, William, married Elizabeth Matilda Patterson, granddaughter of Thomas Leiper, and his brother Stephen married Marianne Smith, granddaughter of Persifor Frazer and first cousin of Persifor Frazer Smith; Stephen's sons Stephen and Joseph both worked for the United States Coast Survey before and during the American Civil War.

== Career ==
John Harris was commissioned a second lieutenant in the Marine Corps on 23 April 1814 and promoted to first lieutenant two months later. He joined the Marines of the USS Guerriere under the command of Commodore John Rodgers that summer at Charlestown, Maryland, and served with the forces that opposed the British advance on Baltimore. He was ordered to the defense of Washington but then ordered back to Baltimore before reaching Bladensburg. He wrote his brother "I could see plenty of red coats but could not get within musket shot of them." He described the attack on Fort McHenry as "the handsomest sight I ever saw... to see the bombs and rockets flying and the firing from our three forts."

The following year he was placed in command of the Marine contingent aboard the USS Macedonian, which sailed with Commodore Stephen Decatur from New York in May 1815 against the Barbary pirates.

Upon his return to the United States, 1st Lt Harris was stationed at Erie, Pennsylvania, and then Boston, Massachusetts. From Boston he was assigned to the USS Franklin, in August 1821. On his return from a cruise in the South Pacific in 1824, according to family legend, he introduced the lima bean from Peru to the United States. He was brevetted captain on March 3, 1825.

Subsequent tours at sea were aboard the USS Java, the Delaware and the Philadelphia. Promoted to the regular rank of captain on June 13, 1830, he was next stationed at Norfolk, Virginia. After that he rejoined the Delaware until March 1836. Three months later he joined a detachment of Marines at Fort Monroe, Virginia, to campaign with the Army in the Indian Wars. During this period he served with distinction in the Creek campaign in Alabama and in the war with the Seminole Indians in Florida. Colonel Commandant Archibald Henderson, serving in the field during this campaign, stated in a letter to the Secretary of the Navy that "Captain Harris while in Florida had command of Mounted Marines and did good service in that capacity."

Captain Harris was awarded brevet rank of major on January 27, 1837, "for gallantry and good conduct in the war against Florida Indians, particularly in the affair of the Hatchee Lustee." He returned to Washington in March 1837 as the bearer of a treaty which had been made by the commanding general with the Seminole chiefs. Promoted to major on October 6, 1841, he served until the Mexican–American War at Philadelphia, Washington, and Norfolk.

In March 1848, Major Harris was ordered to Mexico to cooperate on shore with the squadron off the Isthmus of Tehuantepec. He sailed from New York with a battalion of Marines, but upon their arrival at Veracruz, the armistice had been concluded. He was then ordered to garrison Alvarado with his battalion.

Major Harris rejoined Headquarters in Washington from Alvarado in late summer of 1848. His next assignments were as Commanding Officer of the Philadelphia and New York Marine Barracks. He was promoted to lieutenant colonel on December 10, 1855, and placed in command at Brooklyn, New York, where he remained until January 7, 1859, on which date he was appointed Colonel Commandant of the Marine Corps. At the age of 66, he was the oldest officer to become Commandant of the Marine Corps. He likewise had seen more service than any officer receiving the appointment, having been a Marine for 45 years before becoming Commandant.

During Harris' term as Commandant shortly before the outbreak of the Civil War, nearly half of his officers resigned to serve the Confederacy and he labored to reconstitute the weakened Corps. During the early days of the Civil War, when contraband traffic began to flow from Maryland, Colonel Harris detailed an entire battalion of Marines to serve as United States Secret Service operators in the troubled area, with the result that the situation was well in hand within a brief period.

Services rendered to the Union by Marines under Harris were varied and many. Few, however, have been recorded as outstanding. This may be attributed to the fact that the Marine Corps of that period was composed of relatively few men in comparison with the strength of the Army or the regular Navy. The relatively minor role of the Navy in the Civil War (memorable almost exclusively for its land battles) may be a factor as well.

== Death ==
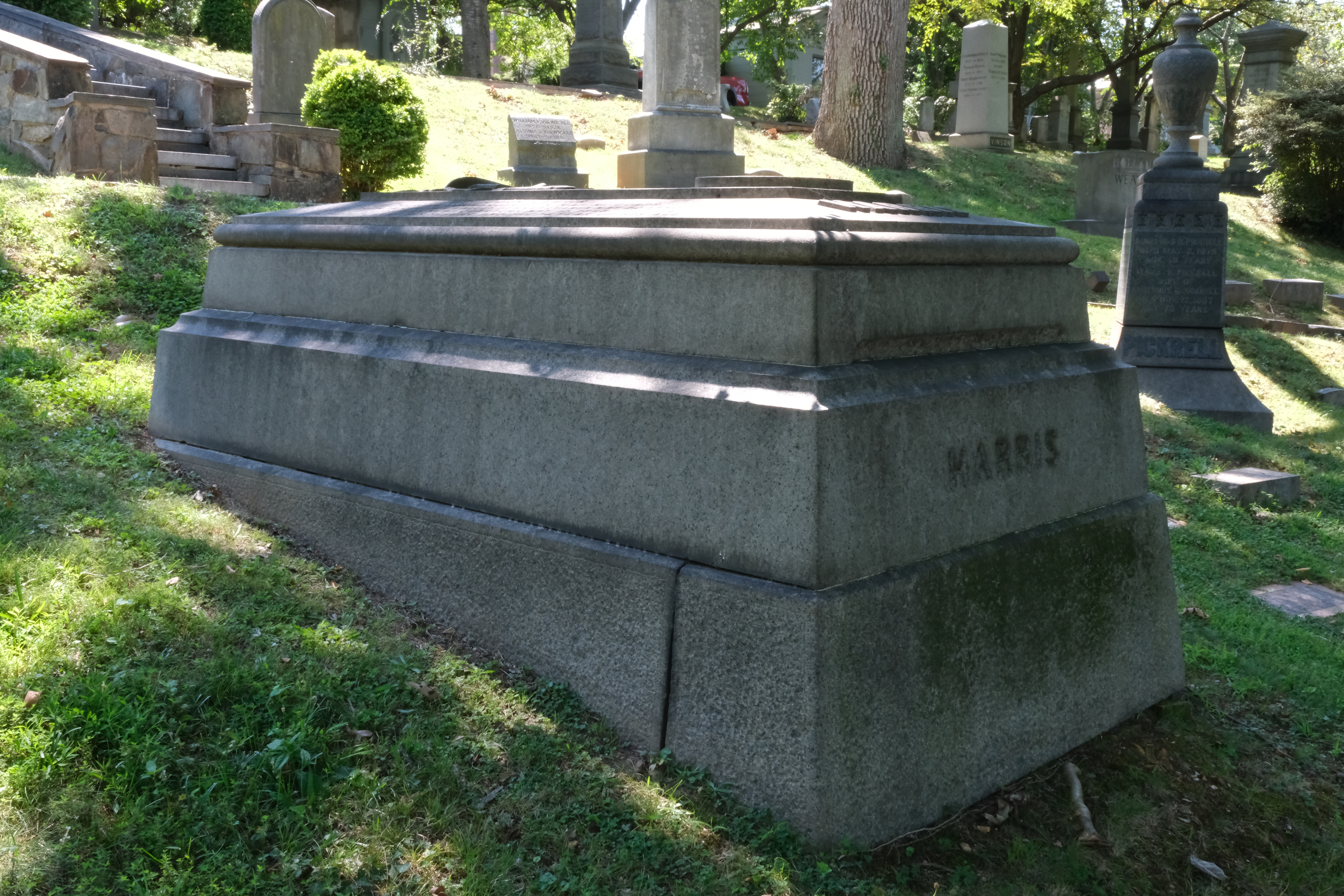
Grave of Harris at Oak Hill Cemetery

Harris died after a brief illness on May 12, 1864, while in office as Commandant of the Marine Corps. He had served as a Marine Corps officer for 50 years. He is buried in Oak Hill Cemetery in the Georgetown area of Washington, D.C.

== Notes ==
Military offices
Preceded by Col. Archibald Henderson	Commandant of the United States Marine Corps; 1859–1864	Succeeded by Brig. Gen. Jacob Zeilin
