= Thomas Harris (surgeon) =

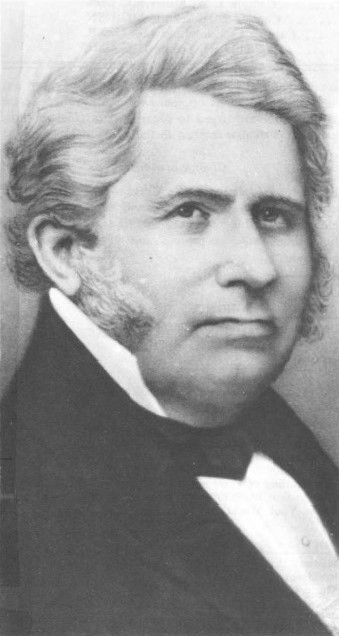
- Born: January 3, 1784; East Whiteland Township, Pennsylvania, U.S.
- Died: March 4, 1861 (aged 77); Philadelphia, Pennsylvania, U.S.
- Relatives: John (brother), Joseph Smith Harris (nephew), William White (grandfather-in-law)
- Military career
- Allegiance: United States
- Branch: United States Navy
- Service years: 1812–1853
- Rank: Surgeon
- Awards: Thanks of Congress

Thomas Harris (January 3, 1784 – March 4, 1861) was a U.S. naval officer. He served as the second chief of the Bureau of Medicine and Surgery.

== Career ==
Harris was born in East Whiteland Township, Chester County, Pennsylvania, to William Harris and Mary Campbell Harris. He attended the Brandywine Academy in Chester County. On 19 April 1809, Harris graduated from the Medical School of the University of Pennsylvania. He entered the U.S. naval service during the War of 1812, and remained there for the rest of his life. He was appointed a surgeon in the navy on 20 July 1812. On 22 September of that year he was ordered to the USS Wasp then commanded by Jacob Jones. He thus took part in the celebrated engagement between the Wasp and HMS Frolic on 18 October, in which the Frolic was captured. Later in the day, the Wasp and her prize were taken by the British ship of the line HMS Poictiers and carried to Bermuda. The officers and crew of the Wasp were shortly returned to the United States. Harris served in the Atlantic and on Lake Ontario thereafter. Harris was one of those who received the thanks of Congress and the medal awarded to all officers who took part in this action.

In March 1815, Harris sailed with Stephen Decatur in the campaign against the Barbary Pirates. He was placed in charge of the wounded.

His most important subsequent service was at Philadelphia. While serving in this city, he oversaw the construction of the Naval Hospital in Philadelphia; he served as the president of the naval board of medical examiners; and he organized the first postgraduate medical school to give instruction in naval medicine. He was one of the best known and most skillful surgeons of his day, and many distinguished civilians came to him for relief. In 1832, he operated on President Andrew Jackson and extracted a bullet that the president had received in a shootout nearly 20 years before. In 1837 he published a biography of Commodore William Bainbridge.

In 1828, he was elected to the American Philosophical Society.

In April 1844, Surgeon Harris was appointed chief of the Bureau of Medicine and Surgery and served in this capacity until 30 September 1853. During his tenure, he brought about improvements in the organization of the bureau and was much interested in the character and qualifications of the young physicians entering the Medical Corps of the Navy.

== Personal life ==
=== First marriage ===
Harris married Jane Phillips Hodgdon, daughter of Major Samuel Hodgdon, who had been an army officer from 1776 to 1800, and who later became president of the Pennsylvania Company for Insurance on Lives and Granting Annuities. They had five children. Jane died July 21, 1834.

=== Second marriage ===
Harris subsequently married Esther White Macpherson (1803 – May 18, 1855), who was a daughter of Major Samuel Macpherson (a soldier in the American Revolution) and Elizabeth White, daughter of William White, the first Episcopalian Bishop of Pennsylvania.

=== Family ===
Harris' father, William Harris, was a soldier in the American Revolutionary War and a member of the Pennsylvania legislature. His brother John was in the Marine Corps for over fifty years, serving as its sixth commandant.

Harris' nephew, Joseph Smith Harris, participated in the Coast Survey, the Northwest Boundary Survey, and in the American Civil War. He later became president of the Reading Railroad.

=== Death ===
He died on 4 March 1861 in Philadelphia, Pennsylvania.
