= Joseph Smith Harris =

American railroad executive and civil engineer

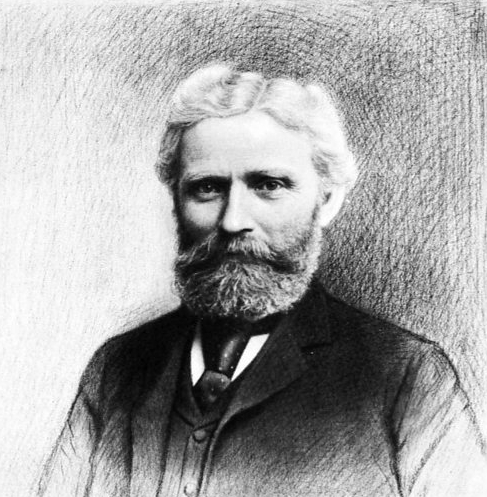
- An illustration of Harris at about age 55
- Born: April 29, 1836; East Whiteland Township, Chester County, Pennsylvania, U.S.
- Died: June 1, 1910 (aged 74); Germantown, Philadelphia, Pennsylvania, U.S.
- Occupations: surveyor, civil engineer, railroad executive

Notes
- Great-grandson of Persifor Frazer.

Joseph Smith Harris (April 29, 1836 – June 1, 1910) was an American surveyor, civil engineer, and railroad executive. Largely self-taught, he worked on several projects for the United States Government, including the United States Coast Survey′s hydrographic survey of the Mississippi Sound in 1854–1856 and the Northwest Boundary Survey of 1857–1861. He worked his way through a considerable number of adventures to become president of the Reading Railroad, which he brought back from its 1893 bankruptcy.

== Family and early life ==
Harris was born on his family's farm in East Whiteland Township, Chester County, Pennsylvania; the house has burned down, but the barn and spring house still stand on what is now the Chester Valley Golf Club. His father, Stephen Harris (September 4, 1798 – November 18, 1851), was the local physician; his mother was Marianne Smith (April 2, 1805 – March 12, 1890). Stephen Harris's brothers (Joseph's uncles) included Thomas Harris and John Harris, who became career military officers. Joseph's paternal grandfather, William Harris (1757 – 1812), had been a Continental Army officer in the American Revolutionary War and thereafter, as well as a member of the Pennsylvania General Assembly. A great-grandfather (on his mother's side) was Persifor Frazer, a figure in the American Revolution who had some prominence in Chester County.

When Joseph was a youth, his father, Stephen, realized that he was dying and that his untimely death would likely leave his family destitute. Looking to prolong his life and also leave his wife with a means of supporting herself, in 1850 Stephen Harris sold his farm and moved his family to Philadelphia, Pennsylvania. His place as the local physician was taken by Septimus Augustus Ogier. In time, the family opened a boarding house, one of the few business occupations available to respectable women of the time. Stephen Harris's death did indeed leave his family short of money, but his children were able to finish high school. Joseph attended Philadelphia's Central High School, graduating in 1853, as did his older brother, also named Stephen. Their younger brother, John Campbell (Cam) Harris, also graduated from Central.

== Marriages ==
Harris married Delia Silliman Brodhead, daughter of George Hamilton Brodhead, who later became president of the New York Stock Exchange, in 1865. They had five children. After the death of his first wife, Harris married Emily Eliza Potts in 1882, and in 1896, after Emily's death, he married her sister, Anna Zelia Potts. His last two marriages were childless. He died "of apoplexy" at home in Germantown, Pennsylvania, in 1910.

== U.S. Coast Survey ==
In 1853, even before graduating from Central High School, Harris took a job as a topographer for the Easton and Water Gap Railroad (which became the North Pennsylvania Rail Road Company later that year), then under construction. He took time off from this job to return to Philadelphia to take his final examinations. He left this job after a year, becoming an astronomer for the United States Coast Survey, whose superintendent, Alexander Dallas Bache, had been president of Central High School. Upon joining the Coast Survey, Harris worked in the late fall of 1854 at Station Yard, Philadelphia, where he was engaged in checking earlier triangulation and astronomic work. By mid-November 1854, this work was completed; Harris was assigned to the Coast Survey vessel USCS Phoenix in the Mississippi Sound. His older brother Stephen was a sub-assistant in the Coast Survey, and it seems that sibling rivalry played a significant role in his work. Although he displayed many quirks of personality, Joseph Harris was meticulous in his work; his autobiography provides, among other things, an idea of U.S. Coast Survey shipboard life in the 1850s.

The trip south was not without its hardships: Harris suffered from diarrhea on the Mississippi River and within a few days of his arrival at New Orleans, Louisiana, he contracted typhoid fever, which nearly killed him. Luckily, he was able to stay with an uncle who was a physician, and who nursed him back to health. After a month in bed, Harris proceeded to the Phoenix, then at Mobile, Alabama, arriving in January 1855. Stephen Harris was put in command of Phoenix in May 1855. The work of the surveyors was made difficult by the large populations of insects—everything from mosquitoes to flying cockroaches—that inhabited the coastal swamps and marshes, by the dearth of clean water, by the arrest of some of the crew after a brawl, and by hurricanes, all of which are described in Harris's autobiography.

During his year on the Phoenix, Harris and his crew performed triangulation along the coast from Pascagoula, Mississippi, to the entrance to Lake Pontchartrain, a distance of about sixty miles (97 km). With the arrival of winter, the commanders left the Phoenix; when the weather turned colder, Harris was required to lay up the vessel for the remainder of the winter. He returned to U.S. Coast Survey headquarters to complete some drafting and other engineering work, and resigned from the Survey in the spring of 1856.

Harris took a similar position with the Kentucky Geological Survey, but he resigned after one month in July 1856 and returned to the Gulf of Mexico to complete his earlier work. In March 1857, Harris was hired as an astronomer for the Northwest Boundary Survey.

== Northwest Boundary Survey ==
In 1846, the United Kingdom and the United States signed the Oregon Treaty, agreeing to settle the Oregon boundary dispute by drawing the western Canadia–United States border along the 49th parallel, which was largely mountainous wilderness at the time. After some delays, British and American Boundary Commissions were established in 1856 and formed a joint commission. Harris and G. Clinton Gardner were hired as assistant astronomers. The commissions began to survey and mark the boundary in 1857, beginning at the Pacific coast of North America.

The American survey team sailed from New York City on April 20, 1857, and proceeded to Panama (then a part of Colombia) by way of Kingston, Jamaica. There they transferred to the newly-built Panama Railway and were able to cross the Isthmus of Panama in four hours. At Panama City, they boarded the vessel John L. Stephens and sailed for San Francisco, California, with several stops in Mexico along the way before arriving on May 15, 1857.

In his autobiography, Harris describes the survey teams, the work, the land, and the local Native Americans. The British survey team, using the latest instruments, had a significant rivalry with the Americans, whom they considered uneducated and using inferior instruments. The two parties would sometimes differ on where the 49th parallel was, occasionally by as much as a mile (1.6 km).

== American Civil War ==
The men of the U.S. Coast Survey were overwhelmingly pro-Union, and when the Civil War broke out in April 1861, they were anxious to use both their surveying skills and their knowledge of the coastline of the Southern United States to aid the war effort. Harris volunteered for war service with the Survey after returning from the Pacific Northwest. By late February 1862, Coast Survey officers and the Survey vessel USS Uncas were prepared to sail for the United States Gulf Coast.

Uncas, under Harris′s command, left New York City for the U.S. Gulf Coast on February 28, 1862. Damage from a gale forced the ship to head for Hampton Roads, Virginia, for repairs and fuel; she arrived in time to witness the Battle of Hampton Roads between the United States Navy monitor USS Monitor and the Confederate States Navy ram CSS Virginia (formerly the U.S. Navy steam frigate USS Merrimack). Because of the damage Uncas sustained during the gale, Harris was ordered to transfer his equipment and crew to her sister ship, USS Sachem, for the remainder of the voyage to the Gulf Coast. Sachem left Hampton Roads on March 18, 1862, and stopped at Port Royal, South Carolina, for coal on March 24. There, Harris was rebuffed by the Navy supply department and was instead ordered, under threat of facing a firing squad, to support an expedition to Edisto Island. Harris declined, repeatedly stating that he was under Coast Survey orders to proceed to Ship Island, Mississippi, and report to Commodore David Farragut. Only through the personal intervention of Commodore Samuel Francis Du Pont was Sachem finally coaled and allowed to depart Port Royal. Following another coaling stop at Key West, Florida (during which four men mutinied and refused orders to pass coal to the vessel), Harris continued on to Ship Island, where he arrived on April 9, 1862, to discover that the fleet had left the day before and gone to the mouth of the Mississippi River. Sachem proceeded to the Mississippi River and arrived on April 10, 1862, when Harris turned over command of the small steamer to Ferdinand Gerdes, who had arrived a few days earlier.

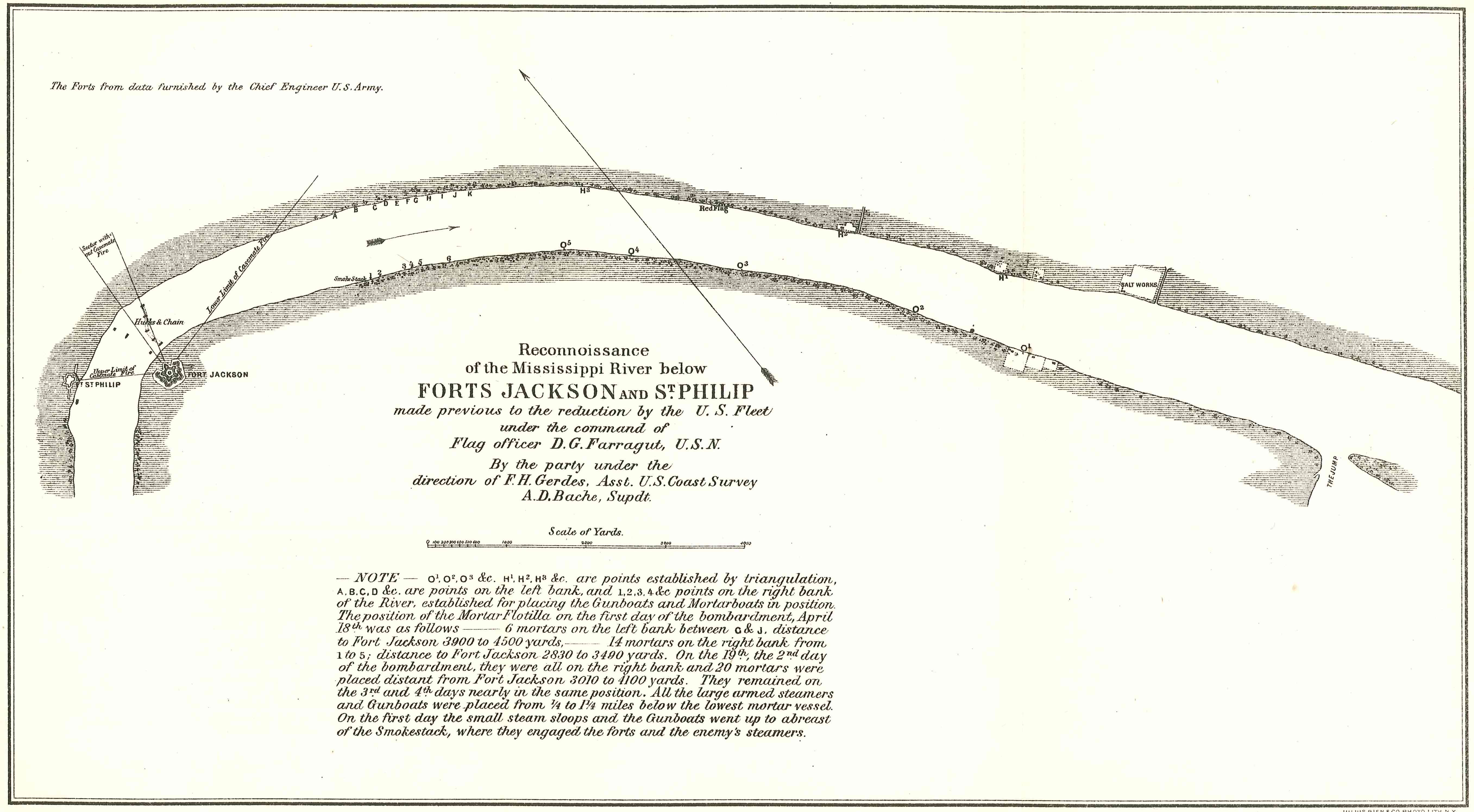
Survey of the Mississippi River below Forts Jackson and St. Philip to prepare for the bombardment of the forts by Porter's mortar fleet. Plan done by the U.S. Coast Survey.

In April 1862, Harris and the other surveyors marked navigable channels in the river and established survey markers on the shore to serve as control points for indirect mortar fire into the forts defending the approaches to New Orleans. They also placed buoys in the river to mark where the mortar boats should anchor. Their work was performed under fire from the forts and from Confederate gunboats. On April 18, 1862, Union mortar boats began firing on Fort Jackson in what may be the first combat use of "blind" firing (i.e., indirect fire) of artillery based on aiming the weapons from a known, surveyed location at a target with known survey coordinate points. Not all of the firing was blind, however. Currents in the river sometimes caused the gunboats to swing at anchor, thus changing their orientation and causing their shells to go astray. Harris spent most of one day up the mast of one of the mortar boats, looking over the trees, noting the location of mortar shell explosions, and calling down rudder commands to cause the boats to vary their headings slightly in order to adjust their firing direction.

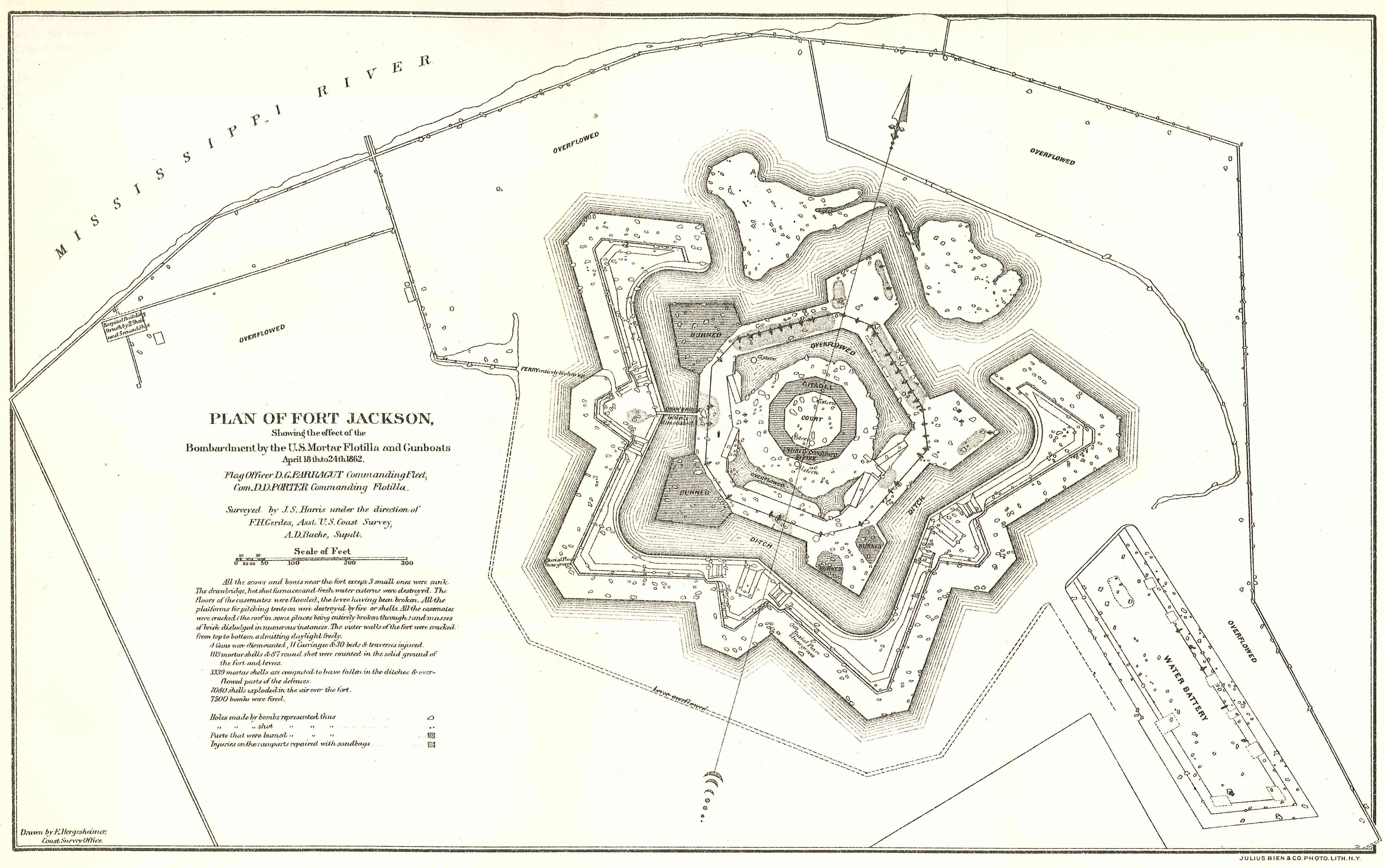
Plan of Fort Jackson showing damage done by the mortar bombardment and gunboats from April 18th to 24th, 1862; surveyed by J.S. Harris.

The forts having been weakened by the bombardment, the naval flotilla forced its way past them on April 24 in the Battle of Forts Jackson and St. Philip) and proceeded upriver to capture New Orleans. The effectiveness of the bombardment of Fort Jackson has been disputed (Commander David Dixon Porter, in command of the mortar boats, had a reputation for bragging, exaggeration, and embellishment of facts in his reports and correspondence), but the Confederate casualties and the subsequent mutiny of the troops manning the forts are well documented.

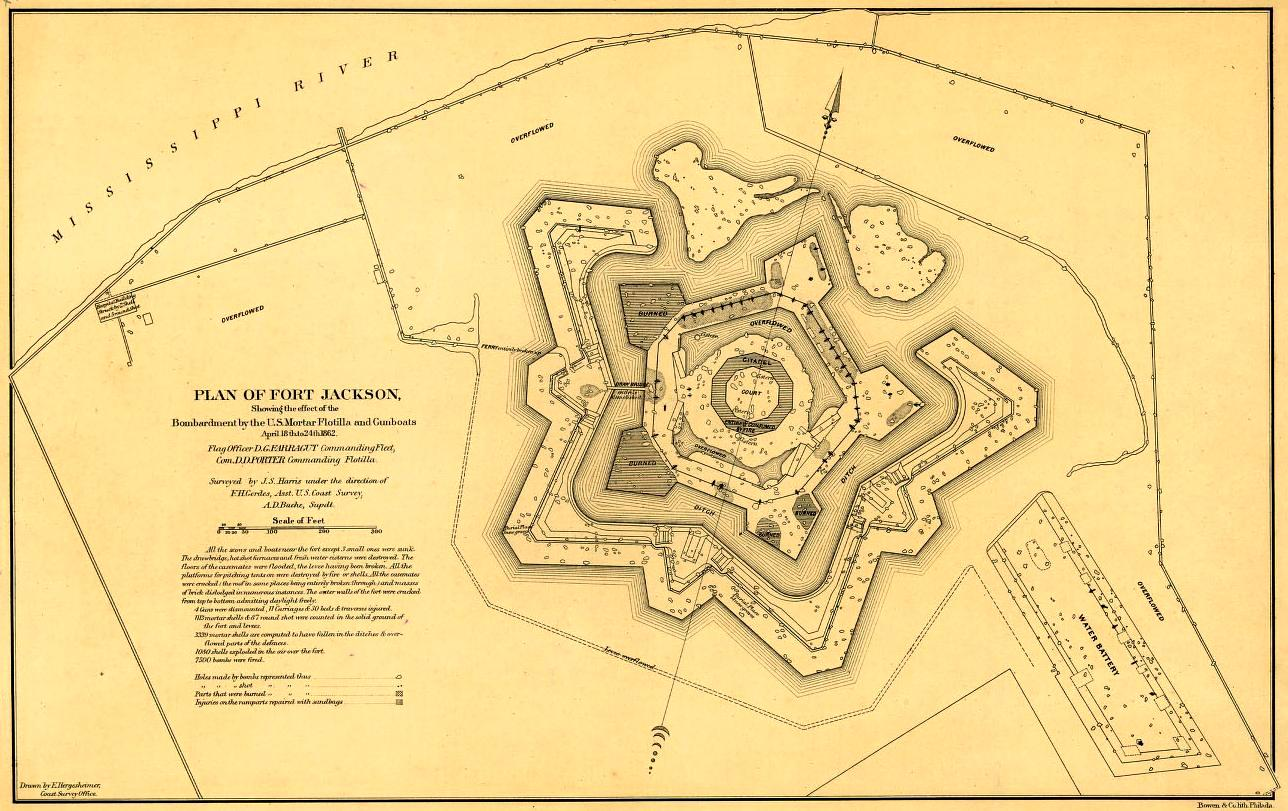
The original U.S. Coast Survey map of the damage done to Fort Jackson by the mortar and gunboat bombardment of 1862. This document is in the possession of the Library of Congress, but scanned in lower resolution than the "Official Records" version.

Commander Porter wrote to Alexander Dallas Bache, superintendent of the Coast Survey, concerning the battle of Forts St. Philip and Jackson:

The results of our mortar practice here have exceeded anything I ever dreamed of; and for my success I am mainly indebted to the accuracy of positions marked down, under Mr. Gerdes' direction, by Mr. Harris and Mr. Oltmanns. They made a minute and complete survey from the 'jump' to the forts, most of the time exposed to fire from shot and shell, and from sharpshooters from the bushes.... The position that every vessel was to occupy was marked by a white flag, and we knew to a yard the exact distance of the hole in the mortar from the forts.... Mr. Oltmanns and Mr. Harris remained constantly on board to put the vessels in position again when they had to haul off for repairs, or on account of the severity of the enemy's fire. ...I assure you that I shall never undertake a bombardment unless I have them at my side.

Following the fall of New Orleans, Harris participated in further surveys along the Gulf Coast, leading up to the Battle of Mobile Bay on August 5, 1864. By mid-1864, his usefulness to the war effort had been exhausted, as the portion of the coastline with which he was familiar was in Union hands. He again left the Survey and returned north, where he re-joined the Northwest Boundary Survey, which was then performing its office work.

== Railroad career ==
Harris returned to railroad work around 1864, entering private practice as a civil and mining engineer and also joining his older brother Stephen in the Schuylkill Company of Pottsville, Pennsylvania. The two worked together doing survey work for the Lehigh Valley Rail Road and the Pennsylvania Rail Road Company. This work exposed them to danger in the form of the Molly Maguires, members of an Irish-American secret society who were active in the coal fields of Pennsylvania at the time. Joseph Harris carried a blackjack with him, in case of attack, but it appears that he never had to use it. He worked for the Lehigh and Mahanoy Railroad from 1864 to 1868 and served as chief engineer for the Morris & Essex Railroad from 1868 to 1870. He was an engineer at the Philadelphia and Reading Coal and Iron Company from 1870 to 1877, and served as superintendent and engineer for the Lehigh Coal and Navigation Company from 1877 to 1880. He became general manager of the Central Railroad of New Jersey in 1880, serving in that capacity until 1882; the Central of New Jersey came under the control of the Philadelphia and Reading Railroad. He returned to the Lehigh Coal and Navigation Company as president from 1883 to 1893, also serving as receiver and then vice president of the Central Railroad of New Jersey from 1886 to 1890. He became vice president of the Philadelphia & Reading Coal and Iron Company in 1892.

At the outset of the Panic of 1893, the Philadelphia & Reading Railroad went bankrupt and its president, Archibald A. McLeod, resigned. J. P. Morgan, who owned or controlled a considerable portion of the P&R's stock and debt, chose Harris, known to be a fiscal conservative, as one of the company's receivers, and later its president. At the time, he was president of the Lehigh Coal & Navigation Company, and it took some persuasion to get him to assume control of his bankrupt rival. He oversaw the reorganization of the shattered company, beginning by stabilizing the railroad and its Coal and Iron Company. A new corporation, the Reading Company, was formed to buy the assets of its bankrupt predecessor, and Harris was its first president. A period of considerable consolidation of the track networks followed, and by the end of the decade, the company reported a combined annual profit of nearly US$2 million.

A down-to-earth civil engineer, Harris foresaw looming difficulties for the Reading that his senior lieutenants could not or would not see. These included shifts in transportation patterns and the rise of organized labor. When he resigned as president in 1901, he noted, among other things, growing factionalism among the company's officers.

Harris was a member of the American Philosophical Society (elected 1887) and the Pennsylvania Historical Society. He became a trustee of the University of Pennsylvania in 1889 and was awarded a D.Sc. by Franklin & Marshall College in 1903. He wrote his memoirs, which included criticism of his anti-union successor as president of the Reading, George Frederick Baer, in the Reading Terminal building in his retirement. He died at home in Germantown in 1910.

== Descendants ==
Joseph and Delia Harris had five children:

- Marian Frazer Harris (1866–1960). She married James deWolf Perry and was known for her long-lasting friendship with Beatrix Potter.
- George Brodhead Harris (1868–1952). He married Elizabeth Holbert.
- Frances Brodhead Harris (1870–1925). She married Reynolds Driver Brown.
- Clinton Gardner Harris (1872–1910). He did not marry.
- Madeline Vaughan ("Sally") Harris (1873–1966). She married Henry Ingersoll Brown, brother of Reynolds D. Brown.

Other descendants include Anne Streeter (grand-daughter of George Brodhead Harris) American politician from Connecticut.

== Notes ==
Abbreviations used in these notes
Official atlas: Atlas to accompany the official records of the Union and Confederate armies.
ORA (Official records, armies): War of the Rebellion: a compilation of the official records of the Union and Confederate Armies.
ORN (Official records, navies): Official records of the Union and Confederate Navies in the War of the Rebellion.
