= Lapp Log House =

Historic house in Pennsylvania, United States

- U.S. National Register of Historic Places
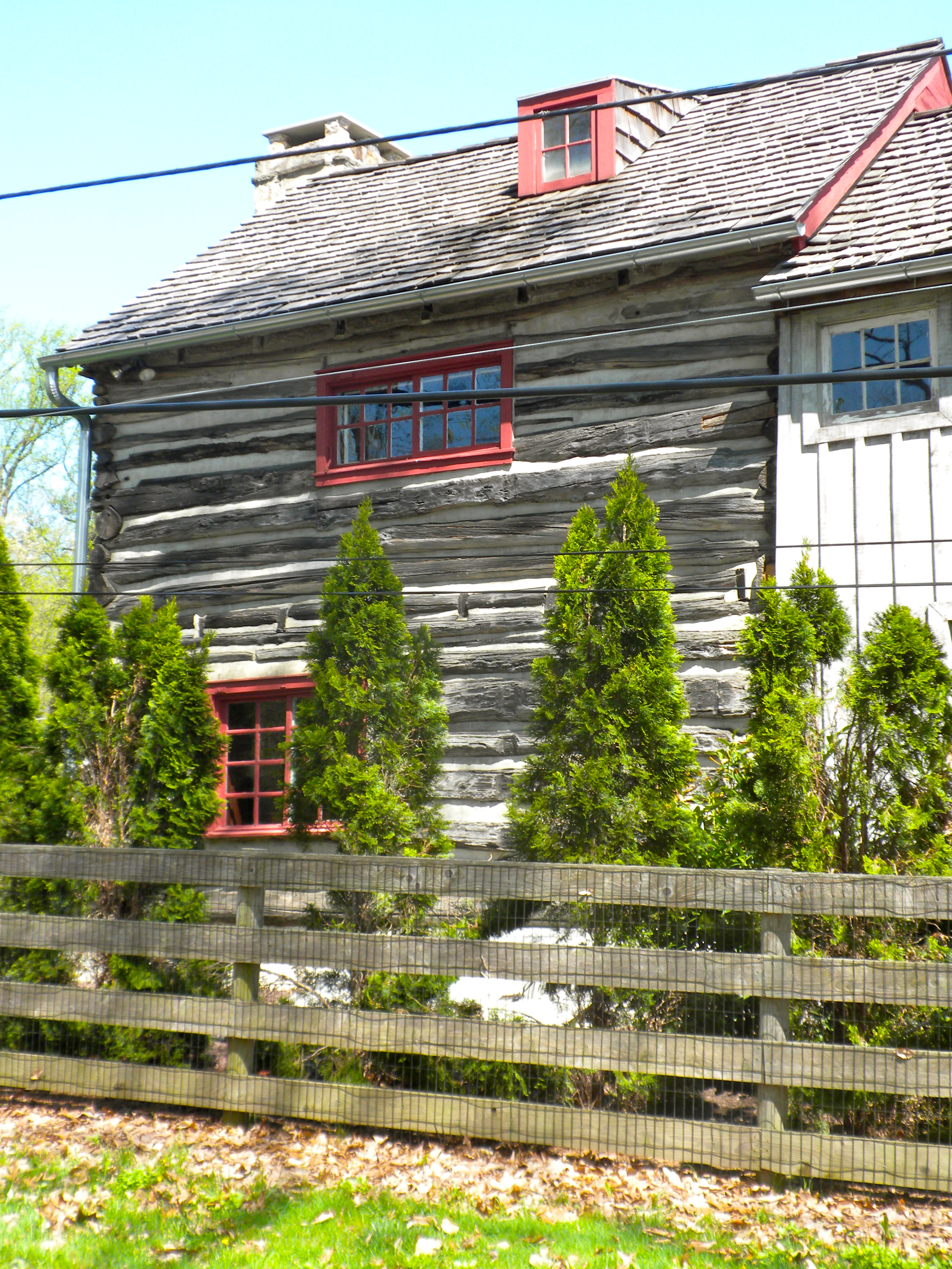
- Lapp Log House, April 2010

- Location within Pennsylvania Location within the United States
- Location: South of Chester Springs at Conestoga and Yellow Springs Roads, East Whiteland Township, Pennsylvania
- Coordinates: 40°03′18″N 75°35′38″W
- Area: 9.5 acres (3.8 ha)
- Built: c. 1800
- NRHP reference No.: 80003455
- Added to NRHP: January 23, 1980

The Lapp Log House, also known as the Hopper Log House, is an historic home that is located in East Whiteland Township, Chester County, Pennsylvania, United States.

It was added to the National Register of Historic Places in 1980.

== History and architectural features ==
The original section of this historic building dates to circa 1800, and is a two-story, one-bay, log structure. The interior has an eight-foot, stone fireplace and gooseneck spiral staircase. A two-story frame addition was built during the 1800s, with an addition built in the 1900s and the former patio enclosed in 1976. The additions were created in a saltbox form. The house was restored in the 1940s. Also located on the property is a contributing stone Pennsylvania bank barn.
