= Spring Mill Complex =

- U.S. National Register of Historic Places
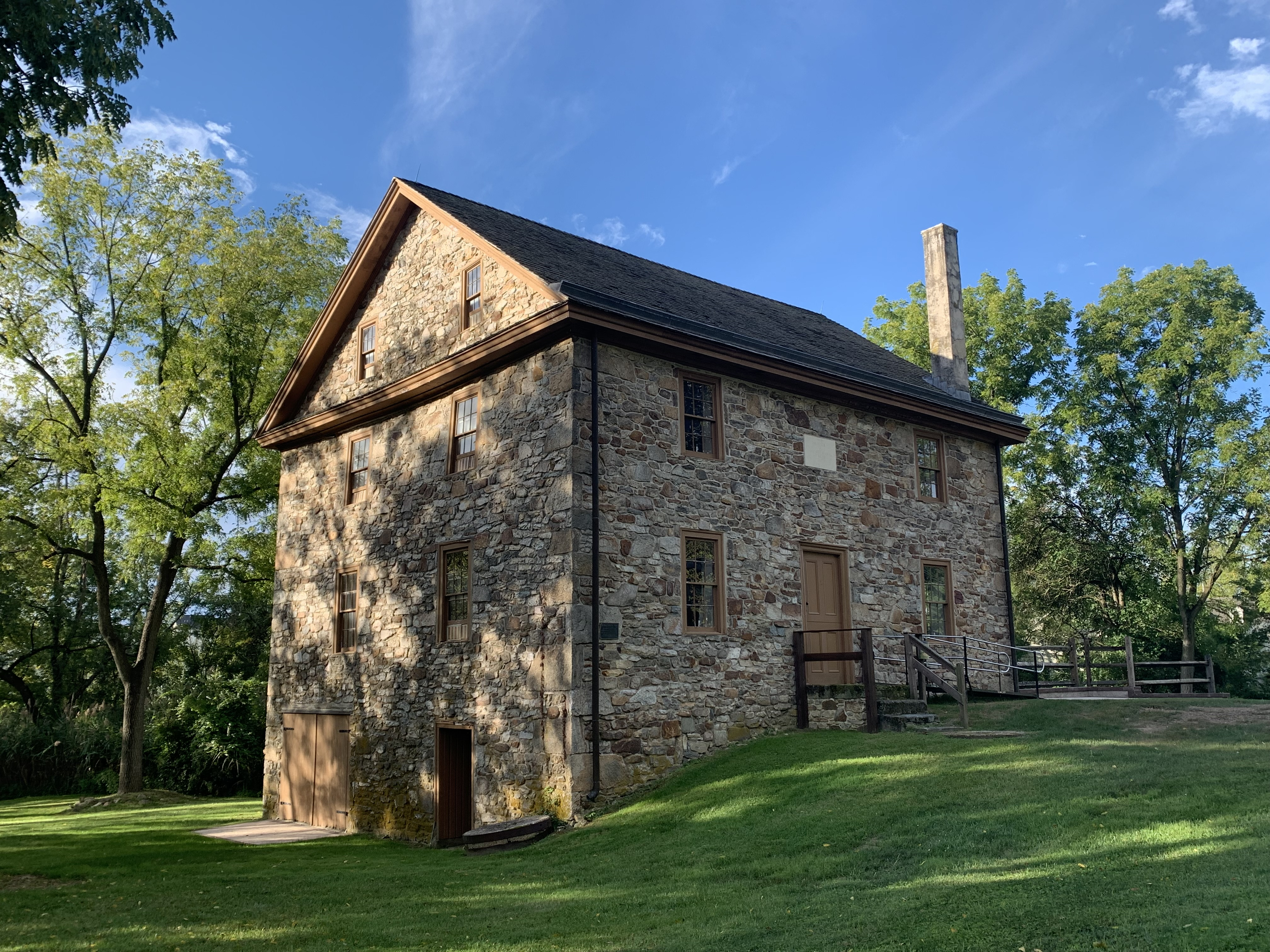
- Gunkle Mill in 2023

- Location within Pennsylvania Location within the United States
- Location: Southwest of Devault at the junction of Moores Road and Pennsylvania Route 401, East Whiteland Township, Pennsylvania
- Coordinates: 40°3′9″N 75°33′53″W
- Area: 2.7 acres (1.1 ha)
- Built: 1793
- NRHP reference No.: 78002370
- Added to NRHP: December 14, 1978

The Spring Mill Complex, also known as the Gunkle Spring Mill, is a historic American gristmill complex constructed in 1793. The complex is located in East Whiteland Township, Chester County, Pennsylvania.

== History and architectural features ==
This mill was built in 1793 by Michael and Chatharina Gunkle. It is a 2 1/2-story, banked stone structure with a gable roof. Also located on the property are a contributing 2 1/2-story, stuccoed stone miller's house, a one-story stone spring house, a one-story stone smokehouse, and a one-story stone carriage house.

Gunkle was a German immigrant from Philadelphia who purchased 974 acres (394 ha) in 1792 in East Whiteland, where he constructed and operated the gristmill, along with a saw mill and a fulling mill.

By 1872 the mill processed 1,800 short tons (1,600 t) of flour, feed, corn, and oats yearly. At the peak of its productivity, the mill ran 18 hours a day. The mill remained in continuous operation into the 1940s.

The Gunkle Spring Mill was added to the National Register of Historic Places on December 14, 1978. It is owned and maintained by the East Whiteland Township Historical Commission.

In 2019, the commission initiated a project to install a new wheel. An announcement of the completed installation was made in the Fall 2021 East Whiteland Historical Commission Newsletter. The wheel was manufactured and installed by B.E. Hassett Millwrights of Lynchburg, VA. Some highlights of the wheel are: diameter - 16'; weight - 2000 lbs.; 72 buckets, each 4' wide; wheel speed - 13 RPM, capable of producing 50 HP.

== Gallery ==
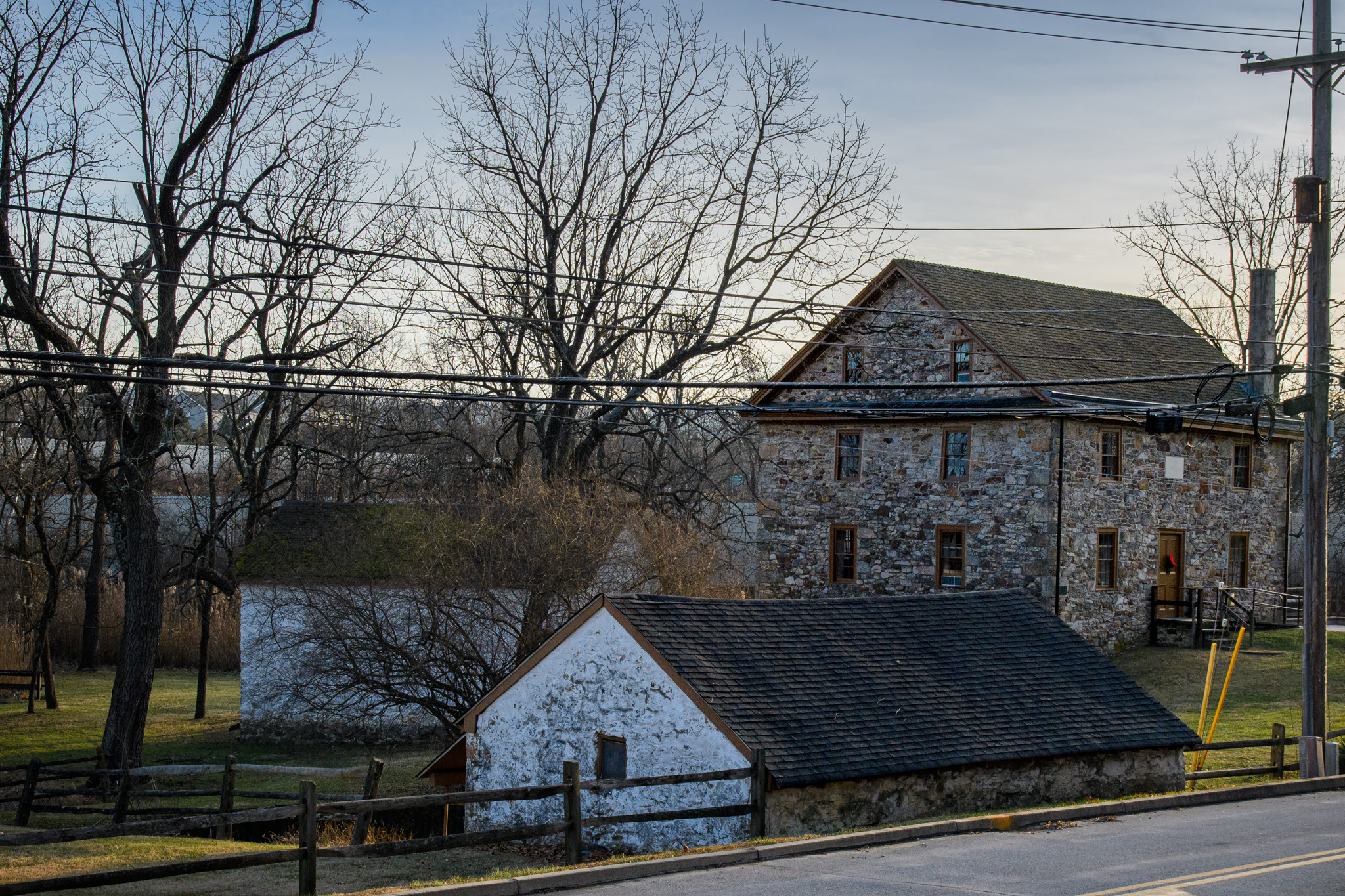
View from the north showing Mill, spring house and carriage house (2024)

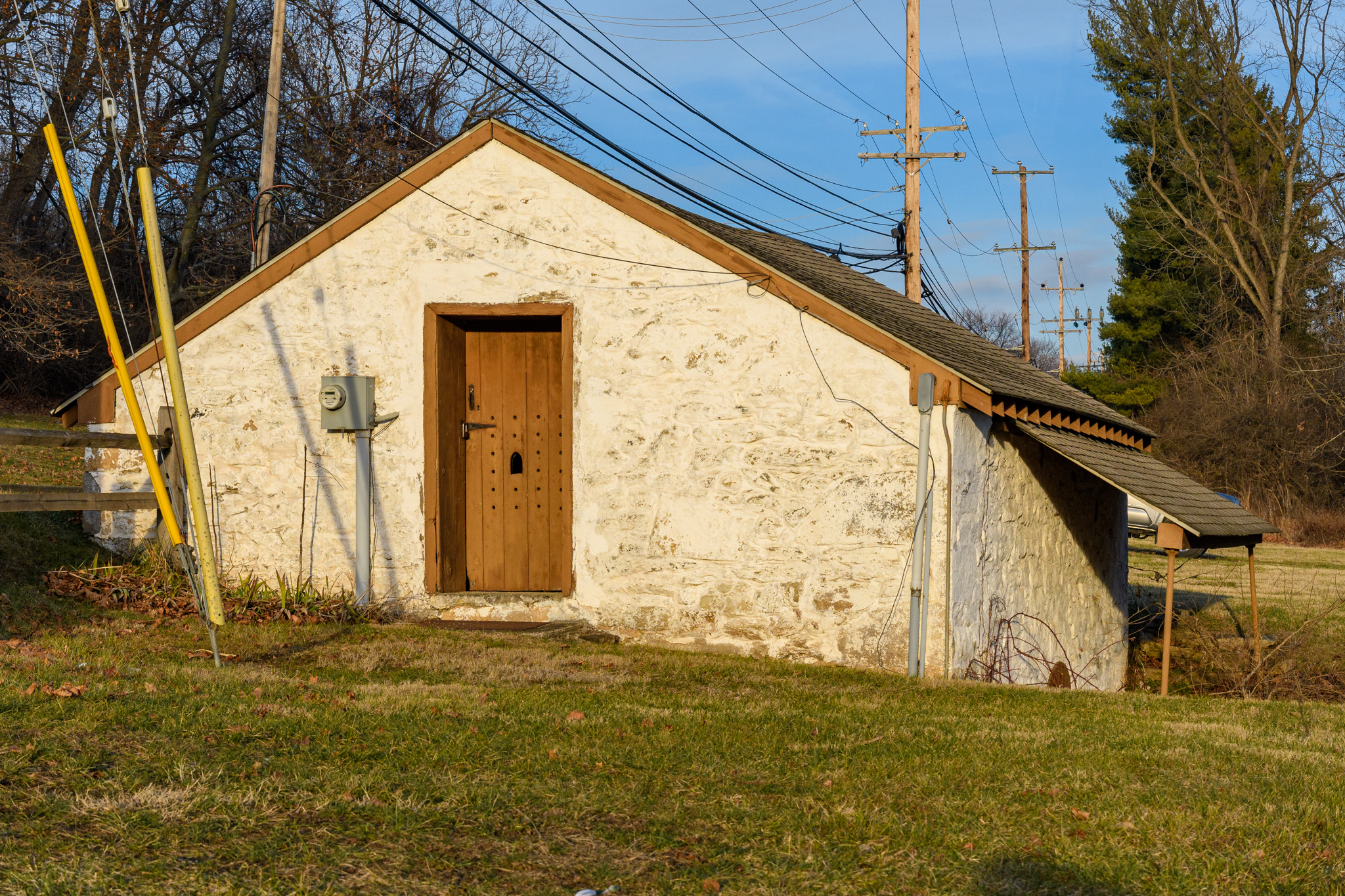
Spring House in 2024

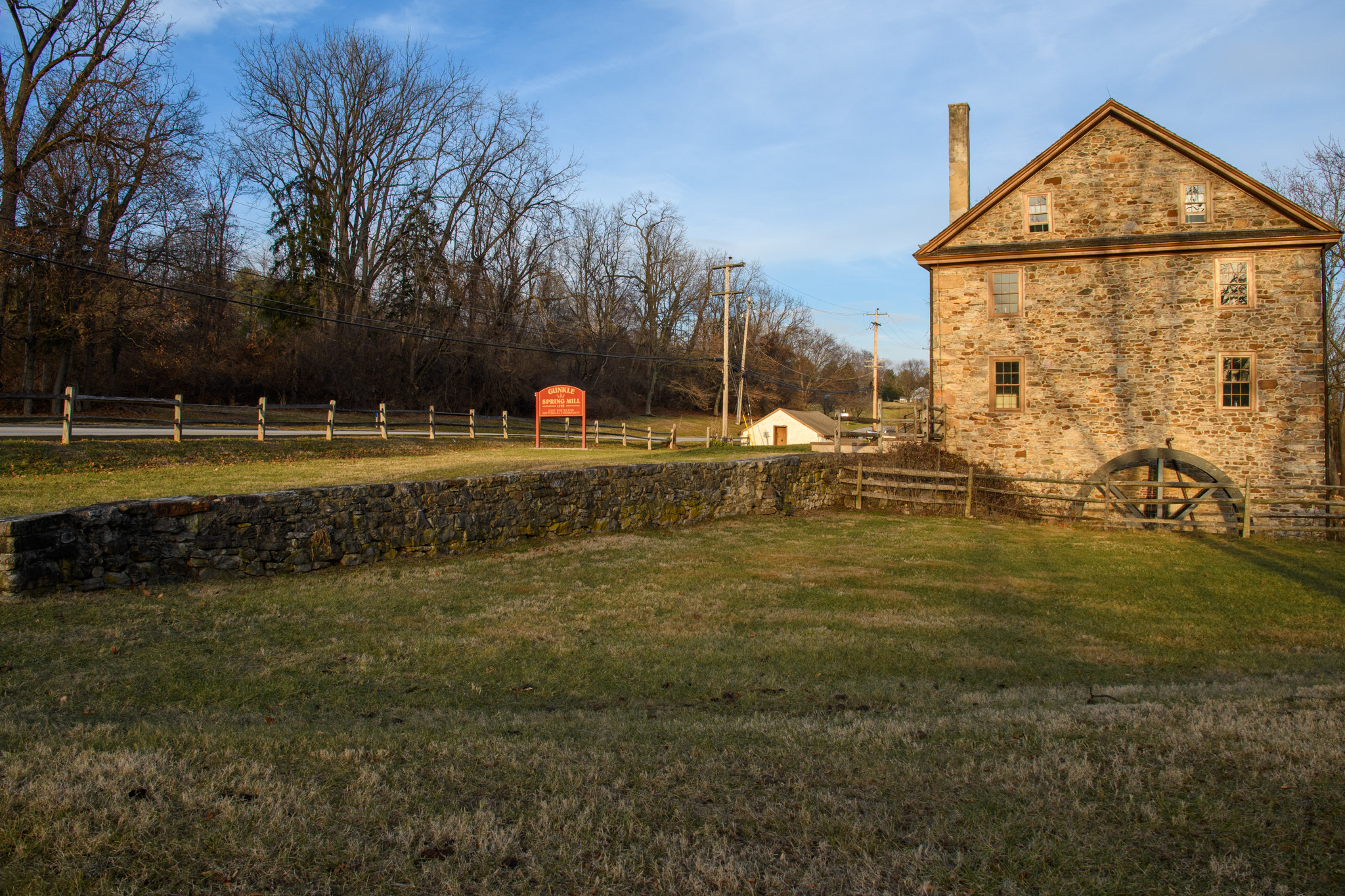
View showing the water wheel (2024)

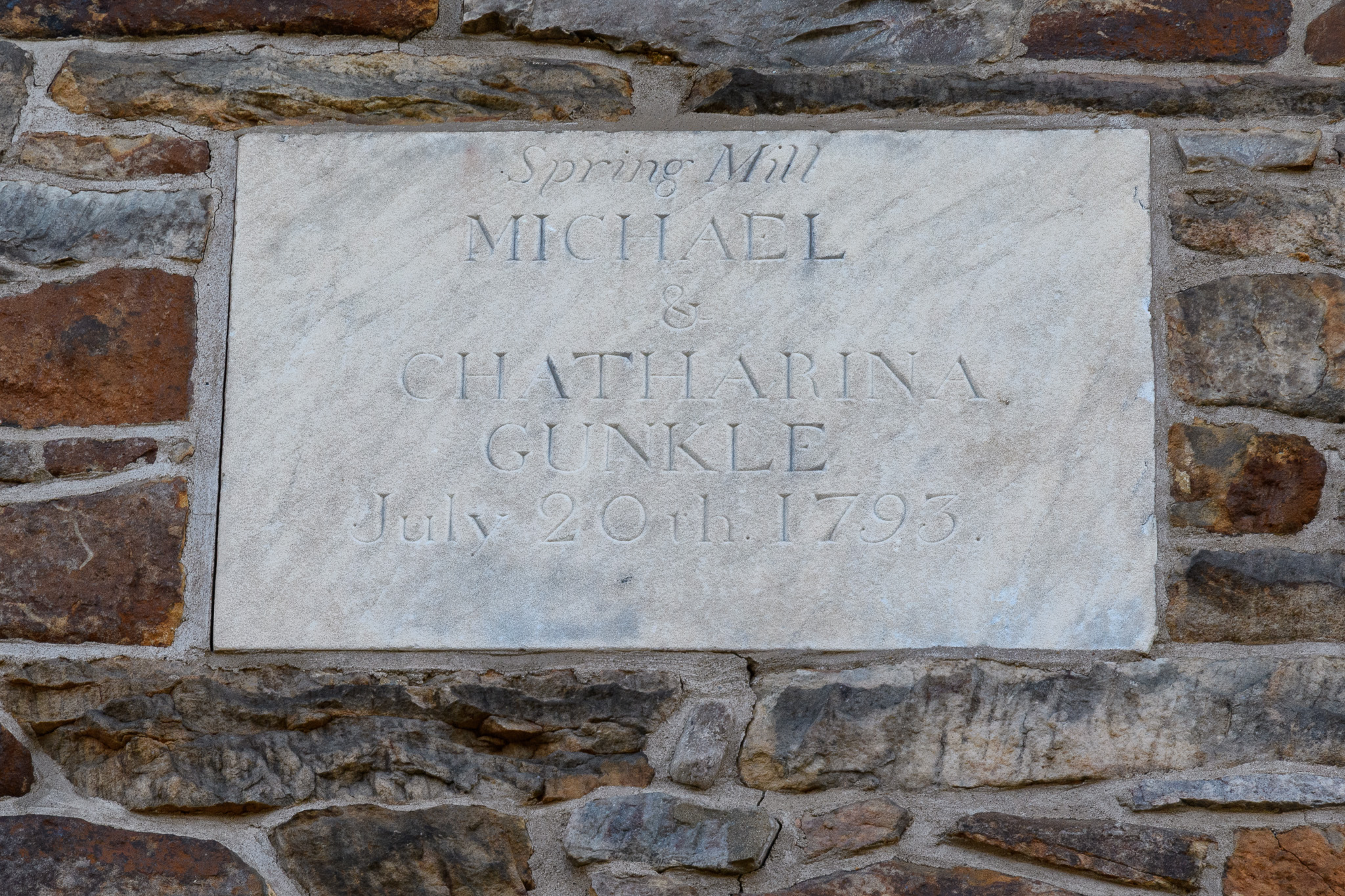
Installed above the front door of the Mill Building
