= White Horse Tavern (East Whiteland Township, Pennsylvania) =

- U.S. National Register of Historic Places
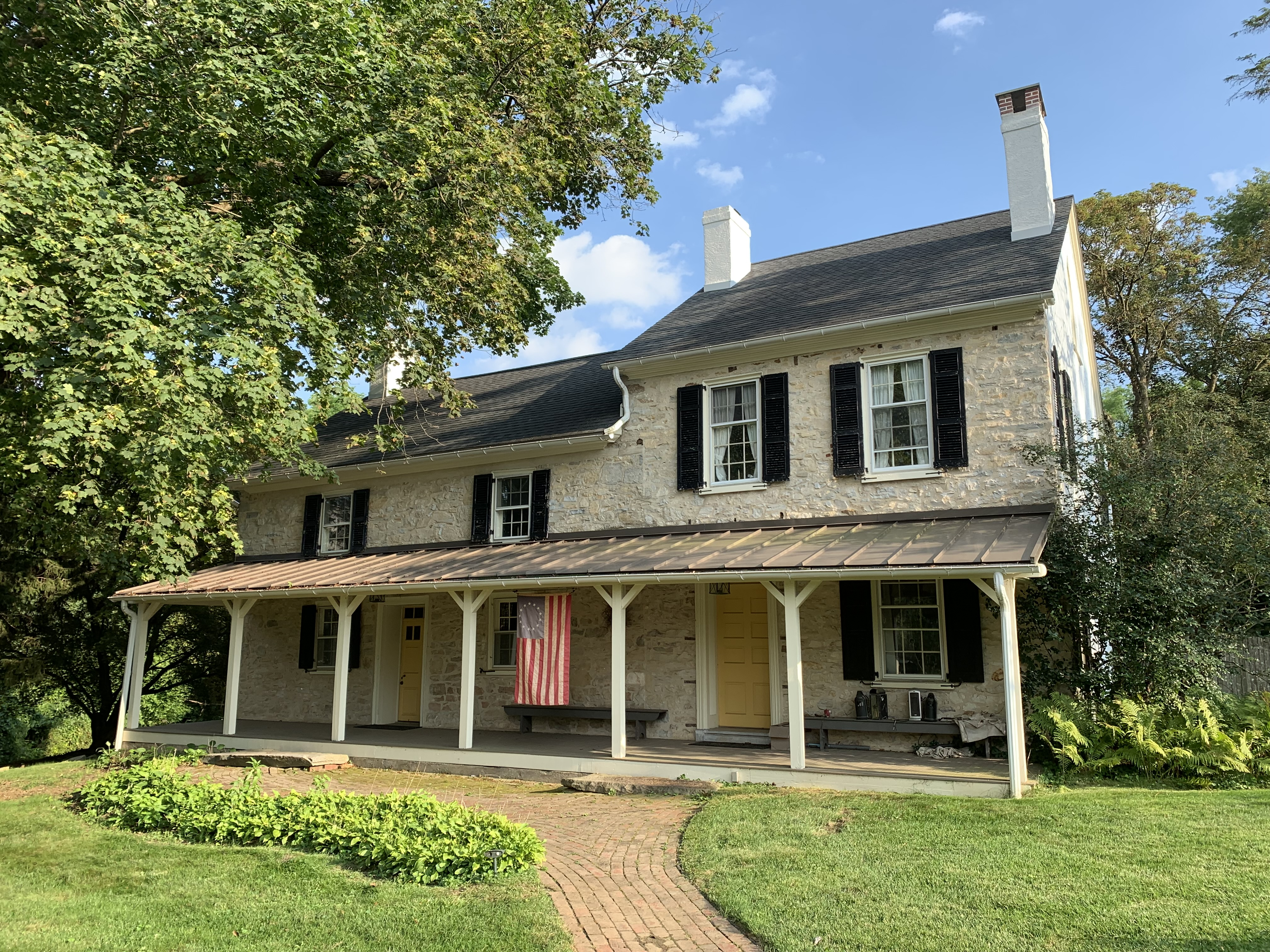
- Logo White Horse Tavern, August 2023

- Location within Pennsylvania Location within the United States
- Location: Northwest of Malvern at 606 Swedesford Road, East Whiteland Township, Pennsylvania
- Coordinates: 40°02′30″N 75°34′41″W
- Area: 1.8 acres (0.73 ha)
- Built: c. 1720, c. 1790
- Website: www.whitehorsetavern.org
- NRHP reference No.: 78002373
- Added to NRHP: December 29, 1978

The White Horse Inn & Tavern, also known as the Old Swanenburg Farm, is a historic American inn and tavern located in East Whiteland Township, Chester County, Pennsylvania.

It was added to the National Register of Historic Places in 1978.

== History and architectural features ==
The building consists of two sections. The original section dates to circa 1720, and is a two-story, stuccoed stone structure. The western section was added circa 1790. Located at mile marker 24 on the Old Lancaster Road, it was an overnight stop on the first stage from Philadelphia to Lancaster. Thomas Jefferson stayed at the tavern on September 4, 1776. It was also an important stop for Washington's messenger from Valley Forge to Lancaster, when the latter served as the temporary U.S. capital.
