= St. Peter's Church in the Great Valley =

Historic Episcopal church in Philadelphia

- U.S. National Register of Historic Places
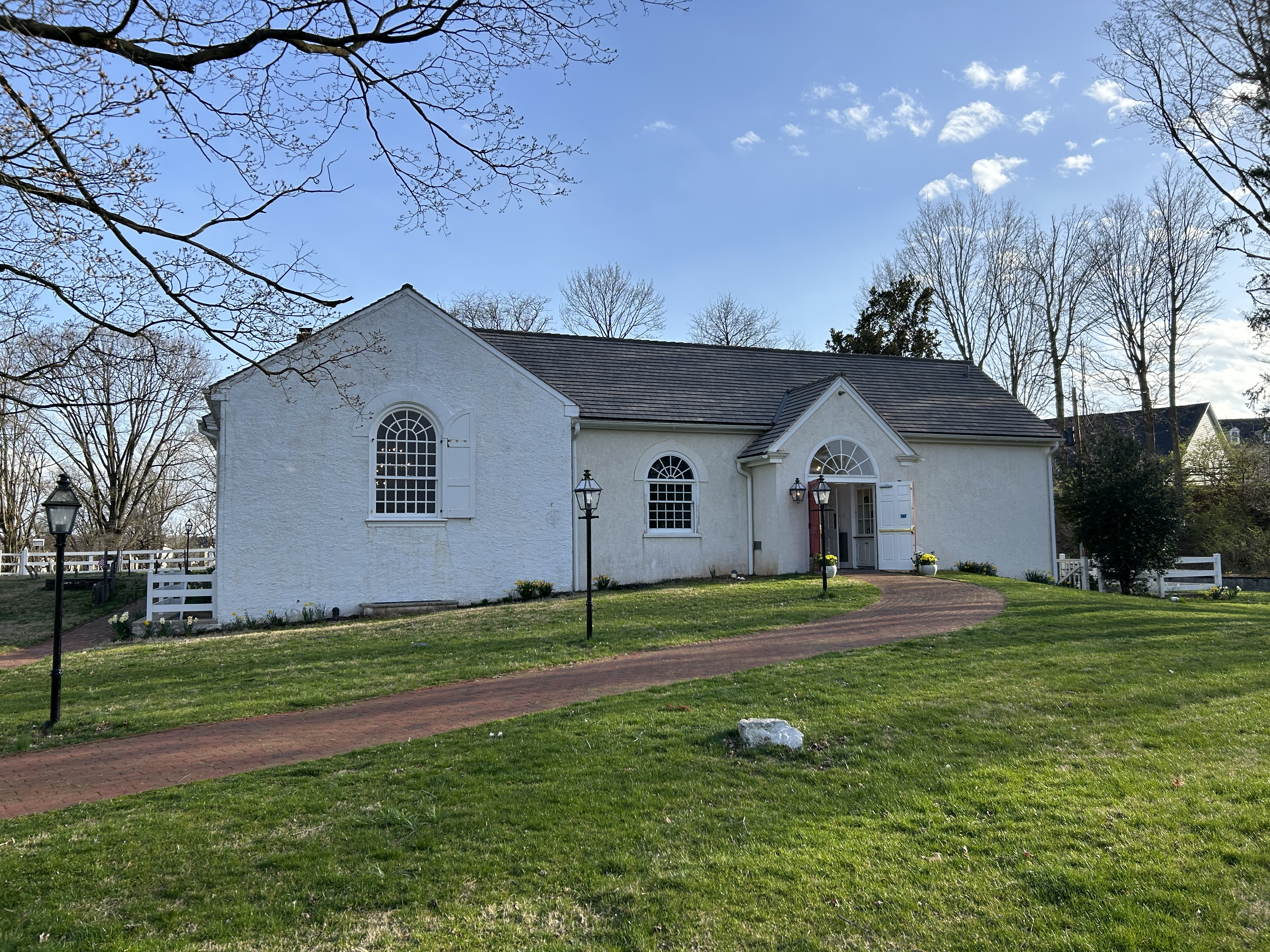
- St. Peter's Church in April 2023

- Location within Pennsylvania Location within the United States
- Location: 2475 St. Peter's Rd., Malvern, Pennsylvania, U.S.
- Coordinates: 40°4′5″N 75°31′33″W
- Area: 1 acre (0.40 ha)
- Built: 1744
- Architectural style: Colonial
- NRHP reference No.: 77001155
- Added to NRHP: November 21, 1977

St. Peter's Church in the Great Valley is a historic Episcopal church in East Whiteland Township, Pennsylvania, a Philadelphia suburb. The church was founded in 1704 as a missionary parish of the Church of England in what was then the colonial Province of Pennsylvania. The parish is part of the Episcopal Diocese of Pennsylvania.

The church reported 500 members in 2018 and 517 members in 2023; no membership statistics were reported in 2024 parochial reports. Plate and pledge income reported for the congregation in 2024 was $516,129. Average Sunday attendance (ASA) in 2024 was 138 persons.

== History ==
=== 18th century ===
The current stone church building was constructed sporadically between 1728–1744 to replace an earlier wooden building built by 1710. The 1744 building was a stone structure with a medium pitched gable roof measuring 47 feet by 28 feet.

During the American Revolution, the church was used as a hospital by both British and American forces.

After the nearby Battle of Paoli in 1777. the British Army, recognizing St. Peter's as part of the Church of England, oversaw the burial of a British officer (believed to be Captain William Wolfe, commander of the Light Company of the British 40th Regiment of Foot), at least two other unidentified British soldiers, and at least five unidentified American soldiers killed in the battle. The British and American troops are buried side by side along the old west wall of the churchyard. Several small American and British flags are traditionally kept at the graves out of respect for the soldiers from both armies (see illustration, below).

=== 19th and 20th centuries ===
A two-story addition was built in 1856, and the 1 1/2-story Parish House added in 1901. Over its three century history, St. Peter's has been led by more than three dozen missionaries and priests. After a series of architectural modernizations (many later referred to as vandalisms) in the nineteenth and early twentieth century, the church was carefully restored in 1944 to somewhat approximate the simplicity of the original 1744 building.

In 1977, the original church building, and the adjacent burial ground, was placed on the National Register of Historic Places.

=== 21st century ===
Early in the 21st century, the growing congregation built a timber-framed parish center and modern worship space designed in a style reminiscent of the original Welsh barns in the area.

== Gallery ==
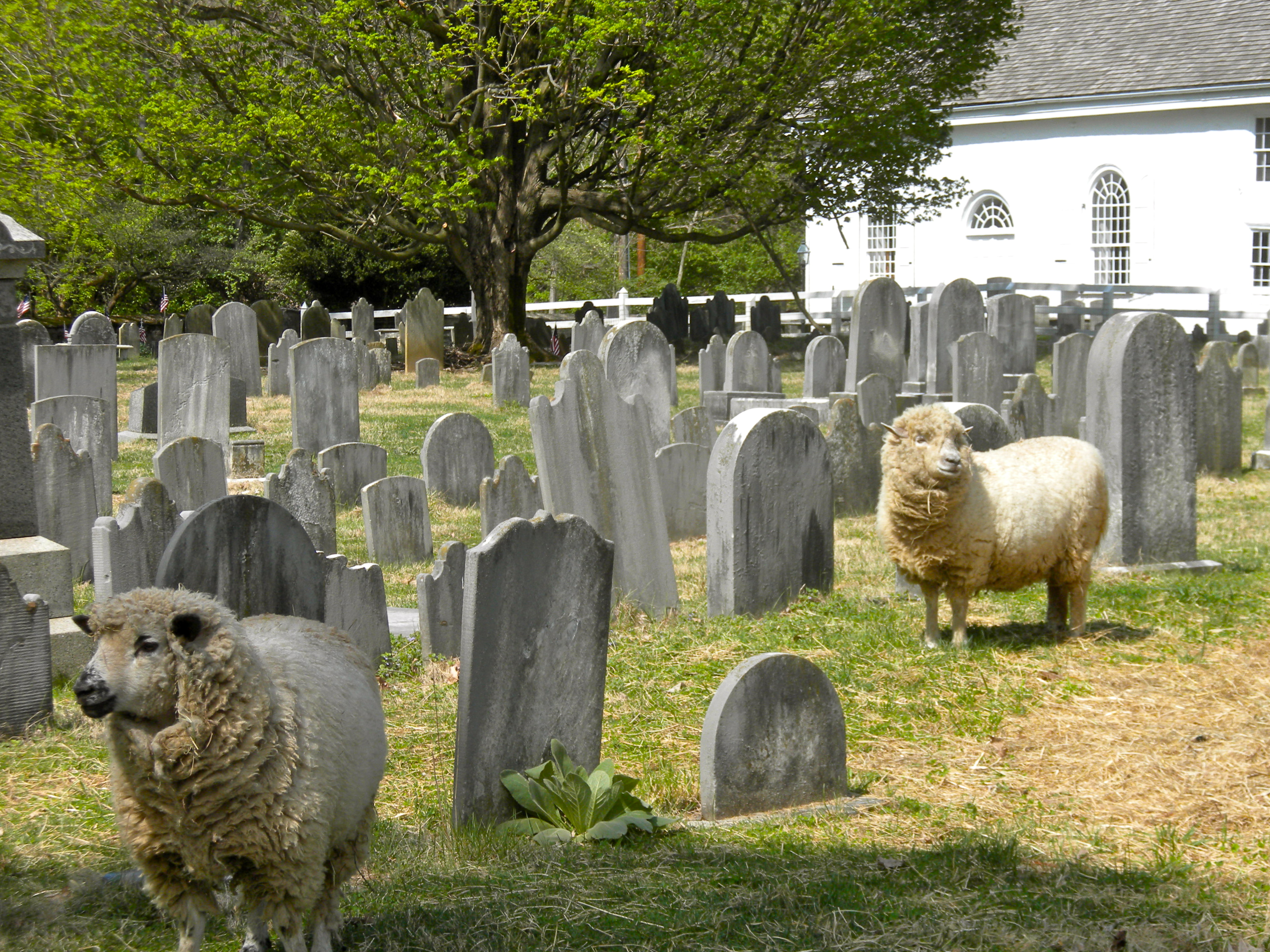
Sheep trim the grass in the graveyard

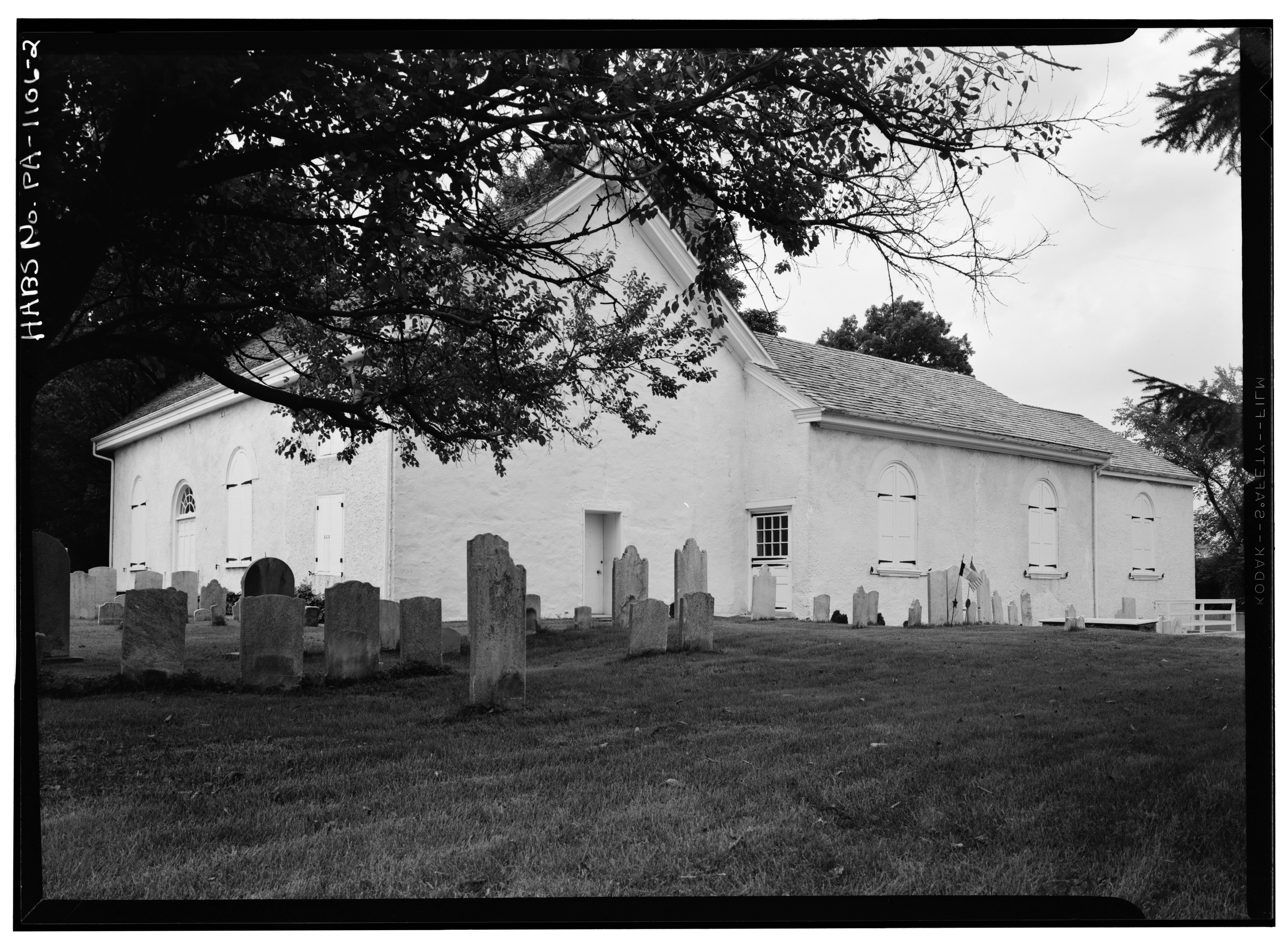
A July 1999 black and white photo of the church

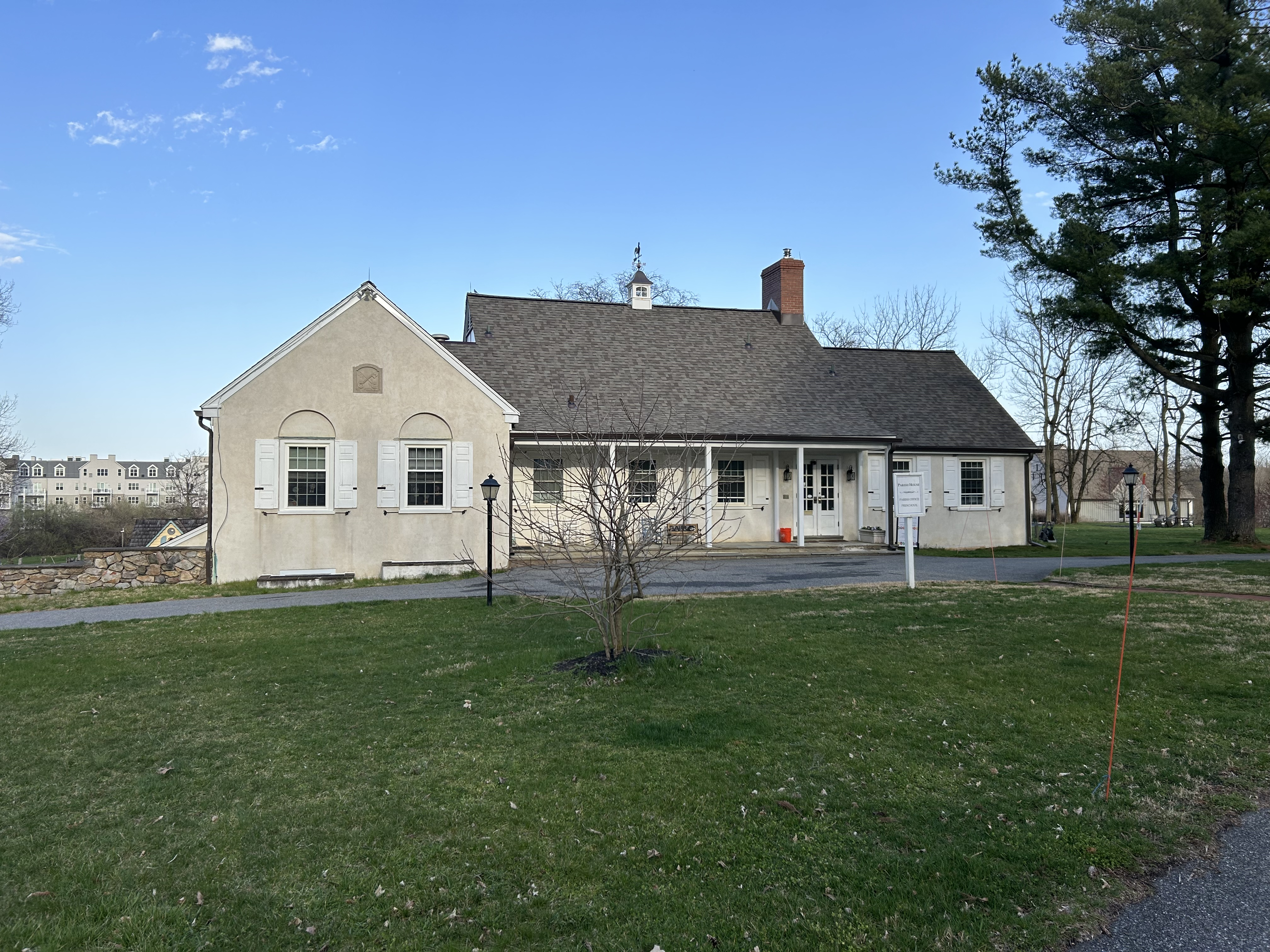
The church's parish office and preschool

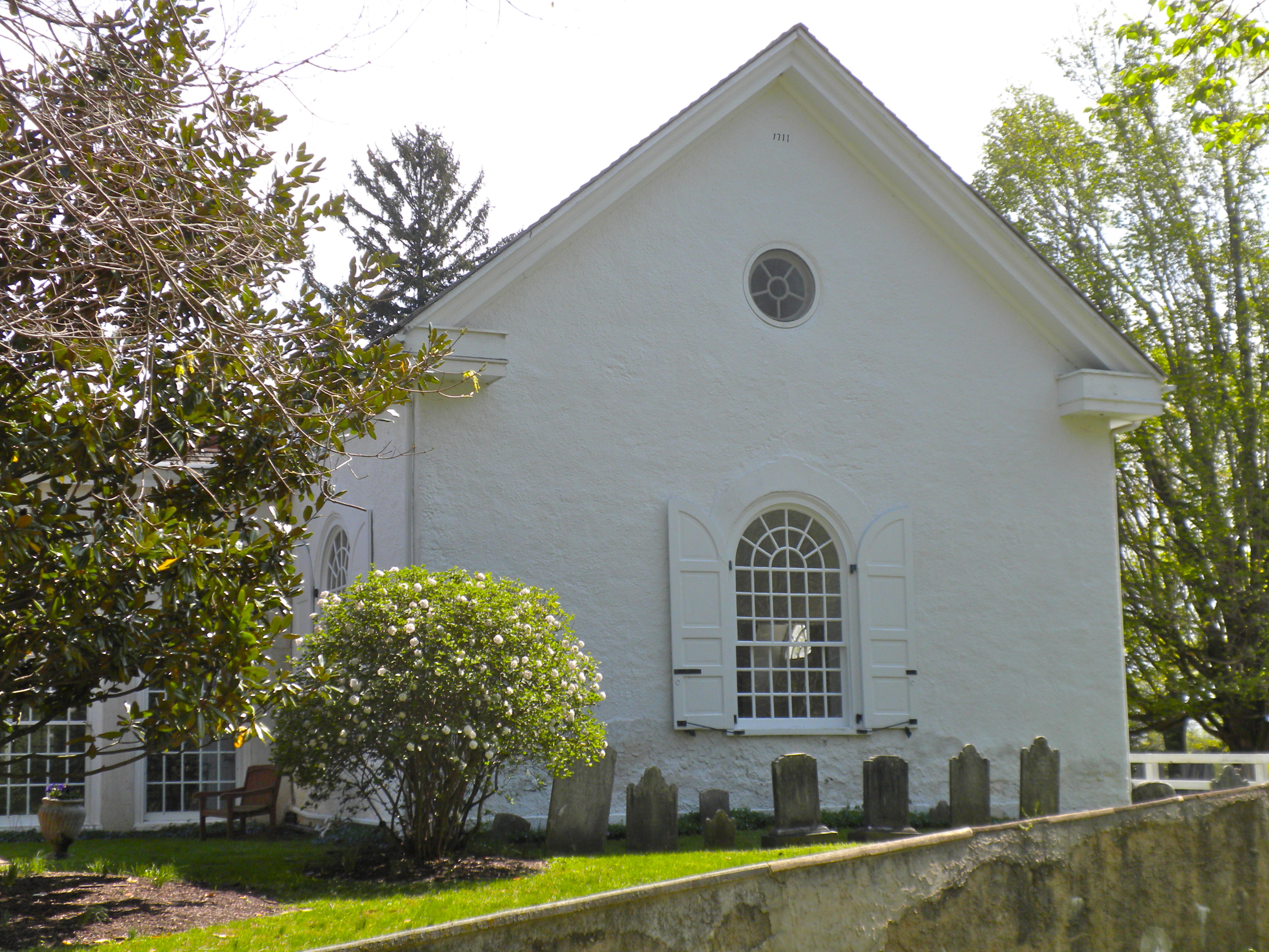
A view of the side of the church in April 2010

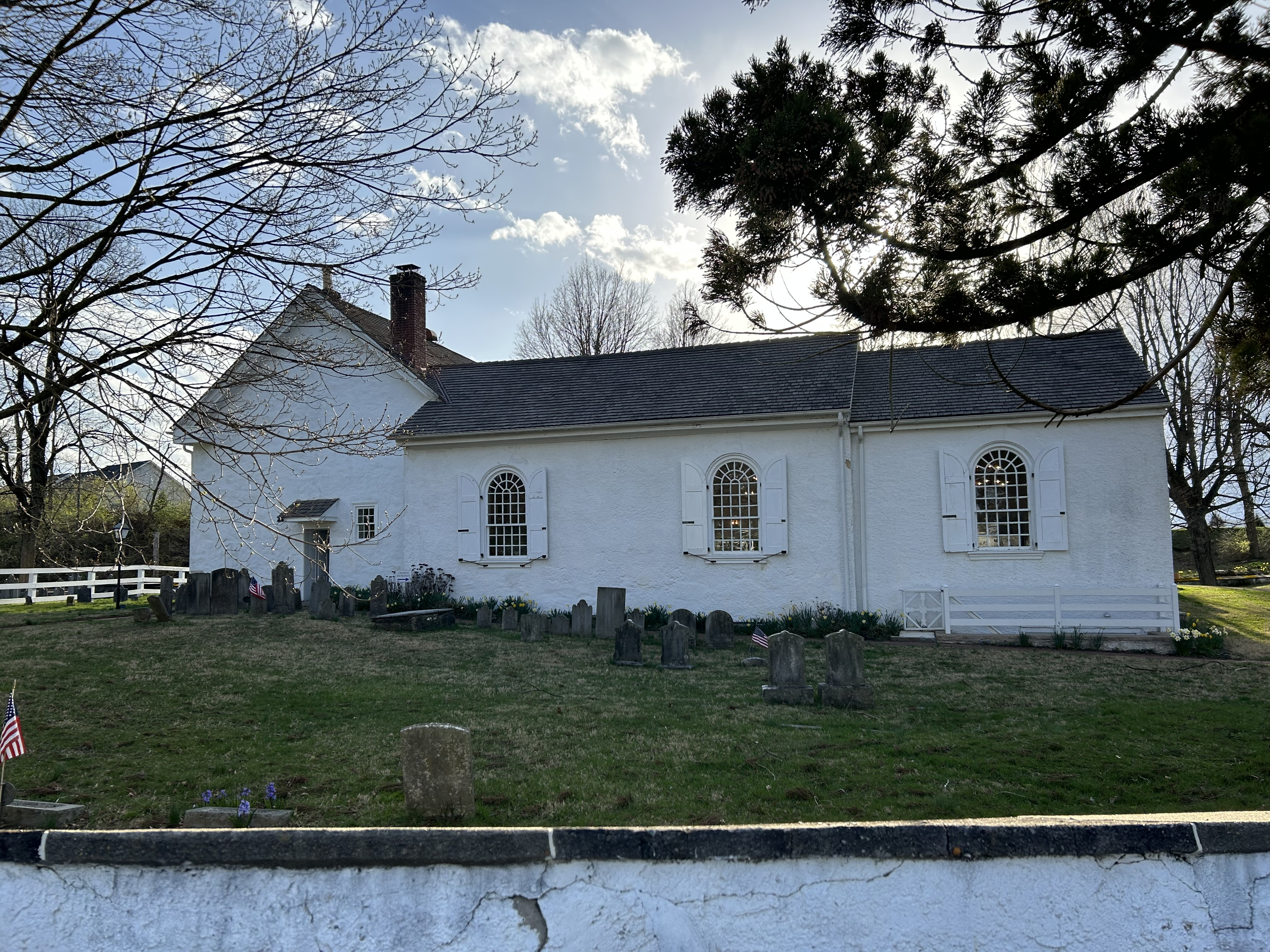
A view of the side of the church in April 2023

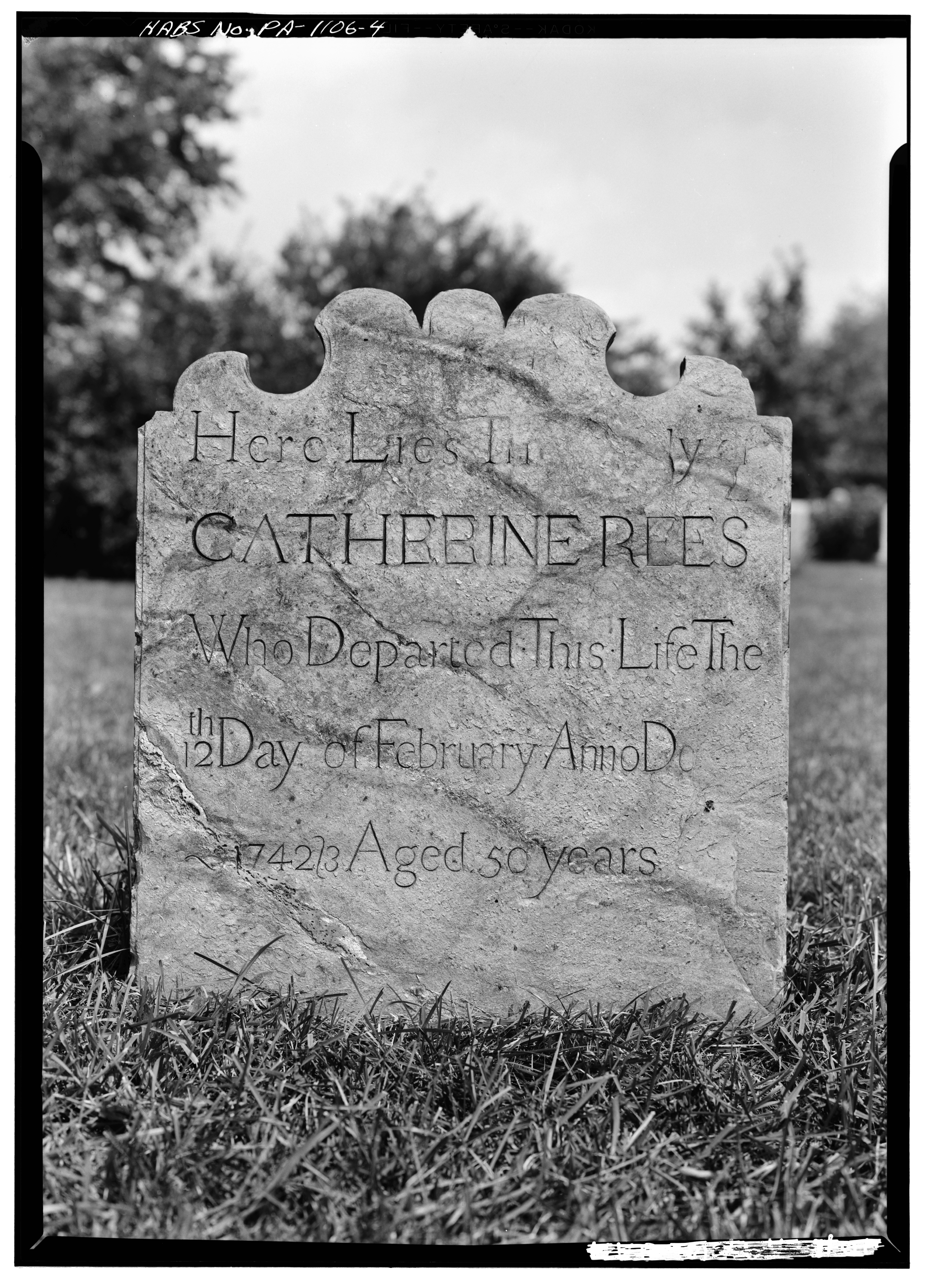
A 1743 gravestone at the church now housed in the Library of Congress

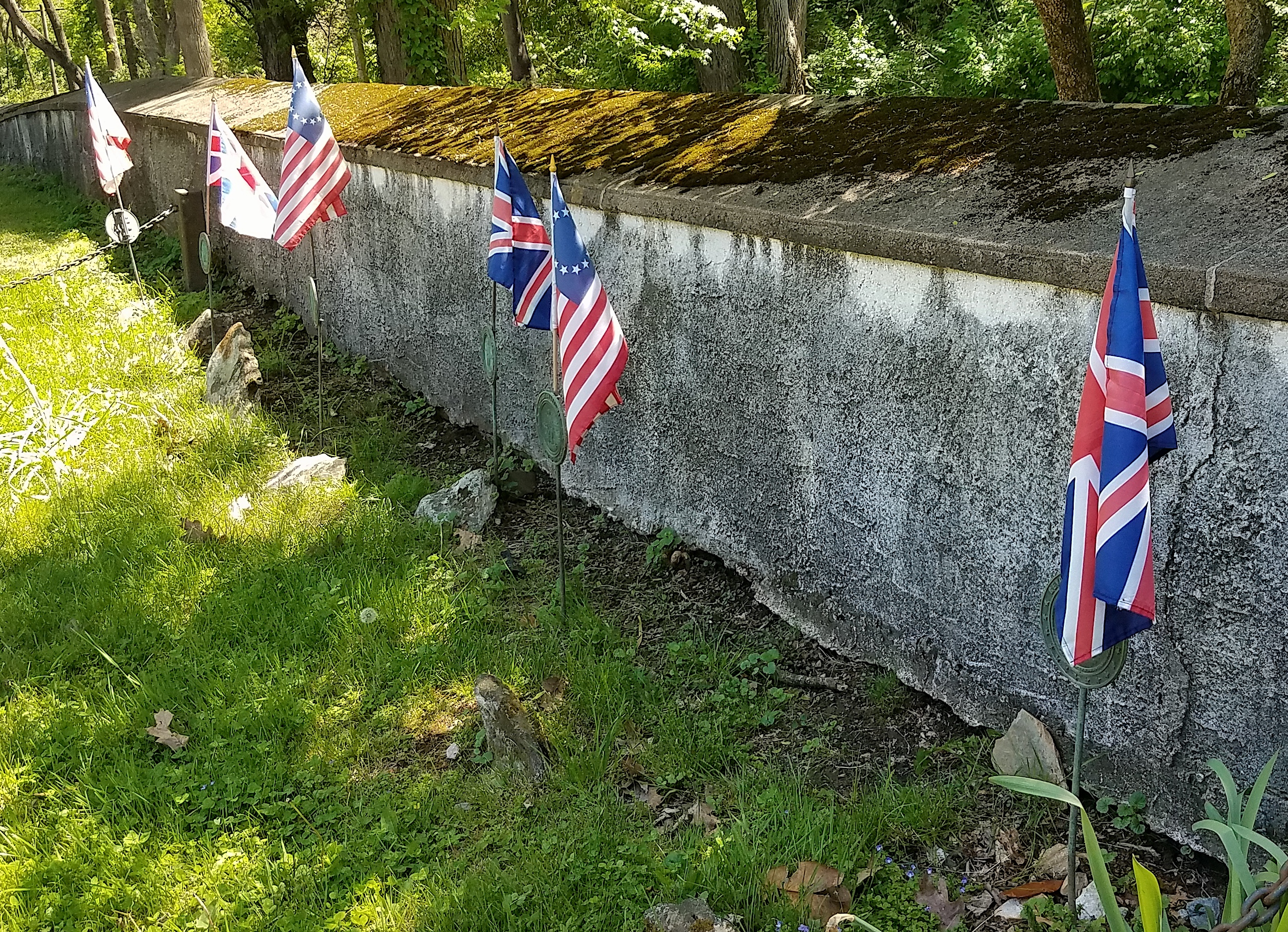
Common grave of British and American soldiers killed at the Battle of Paoli in the Revolutionary War
