= Persifor Frazer =

Persifor Frazer (August 9, 1736 – April 24, 1792) was an American farmer, soldier, and industrialist, and the founder of one of the most prominent families of Philadelphia, Pennsylvania.

== Life ==
Frazer, the son of John and Mary Smith Frazer, was born in Newtown Township, Pennsylvania, not far from Philadelphia. He married Mary "Polly" Taylor on October 2, 1766, and managed a prosperous farm near Brandywine Creek. They raised ten children, many of whom established their own successful businesses and lineages. Grandson Persifor Frazer Smith was a leading brigadier general in the U.S. Army during the Mexican–American War.

Frazer became a leading regional political figure resisting the growing British power in the colonies. During the American Revolutionary War, in early 1776, he was elected as the captain of Company A, Fourth Pennsylvania Battalion and later was promoted to lieutenant colonel of the Fifth Pennsylvania Line, both under "Mad Anthony" Wayne. Frazer was captured at the Battle of Brandywine and held as a prisoner of war in the Walnut Street prison in Philadelphia until his parole. He was later appointed as a brigadier general in the Pennsylvania militia.

Following the war, Frazer was an iron manufacturer and merchant, owning and operating the Sarum Forge.

== Descendants ==
Children of Persifor and Mary Frazer:

- Sarah (1769–1841)
- Robert (1771–1821)
- Mary Anne (1774–1845), who married Jonathan Smith
- Persifor (1776–1798)
- Martha (1778)
- Mary (1780–1862), who married Joseph Smith, her brother-in-law Jonathan's brother
- John (1781–1783)
- Martha (1783–1867), who married William Morris
- Elizabeth (1786–1788)
- Elizabeth (1788–1857), who married Henry Myers

Other descendants include Persifor Frazer Smith (son of Mary Anne), general in the Mexican–American War, and Joseph Smith Harris (grandson of Mary), president of the Reading Railroad. His grandson Persifor Frazer Smith (son of Mary) was a lawyer and member of the Pennsylvania legislature.

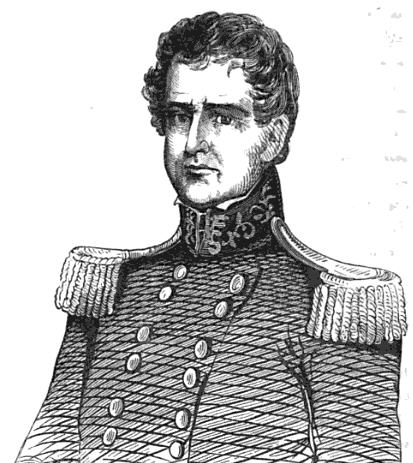
Persifor Frazer Smith

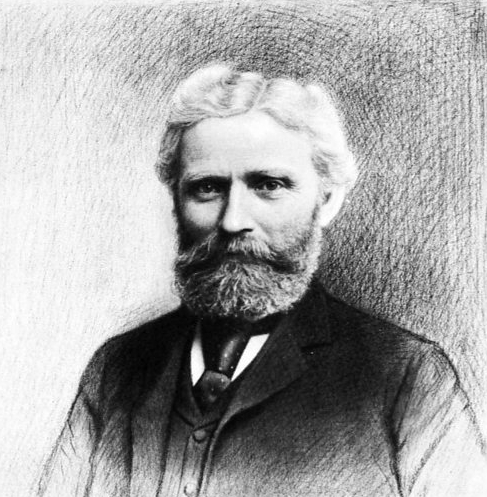
Joseph Smith Harris
