= East Whiteland Township, Pennsylvania =

Township in Pennsylvania, US

East Whiteland Township
- Township
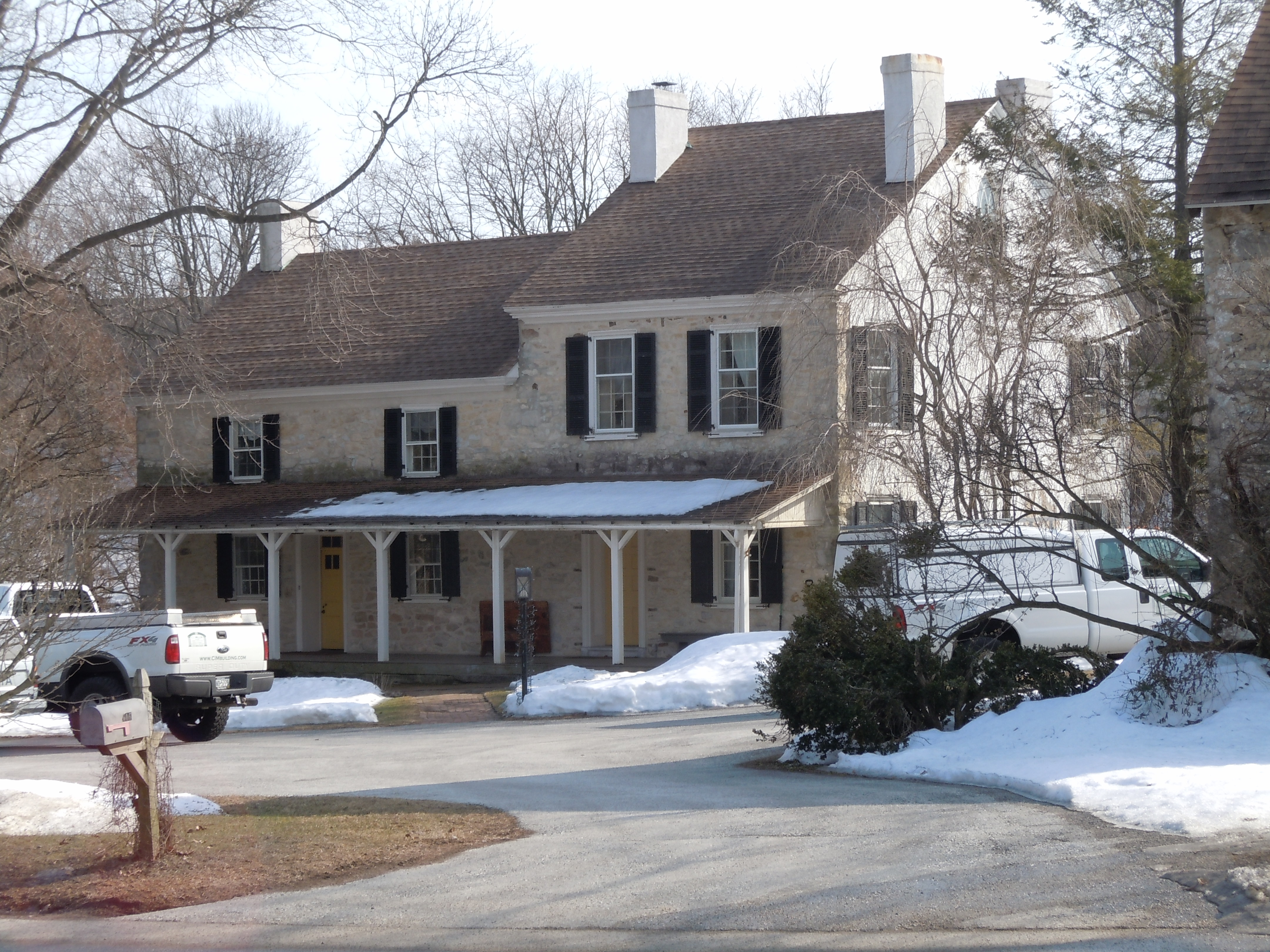
- White Horse Tavern

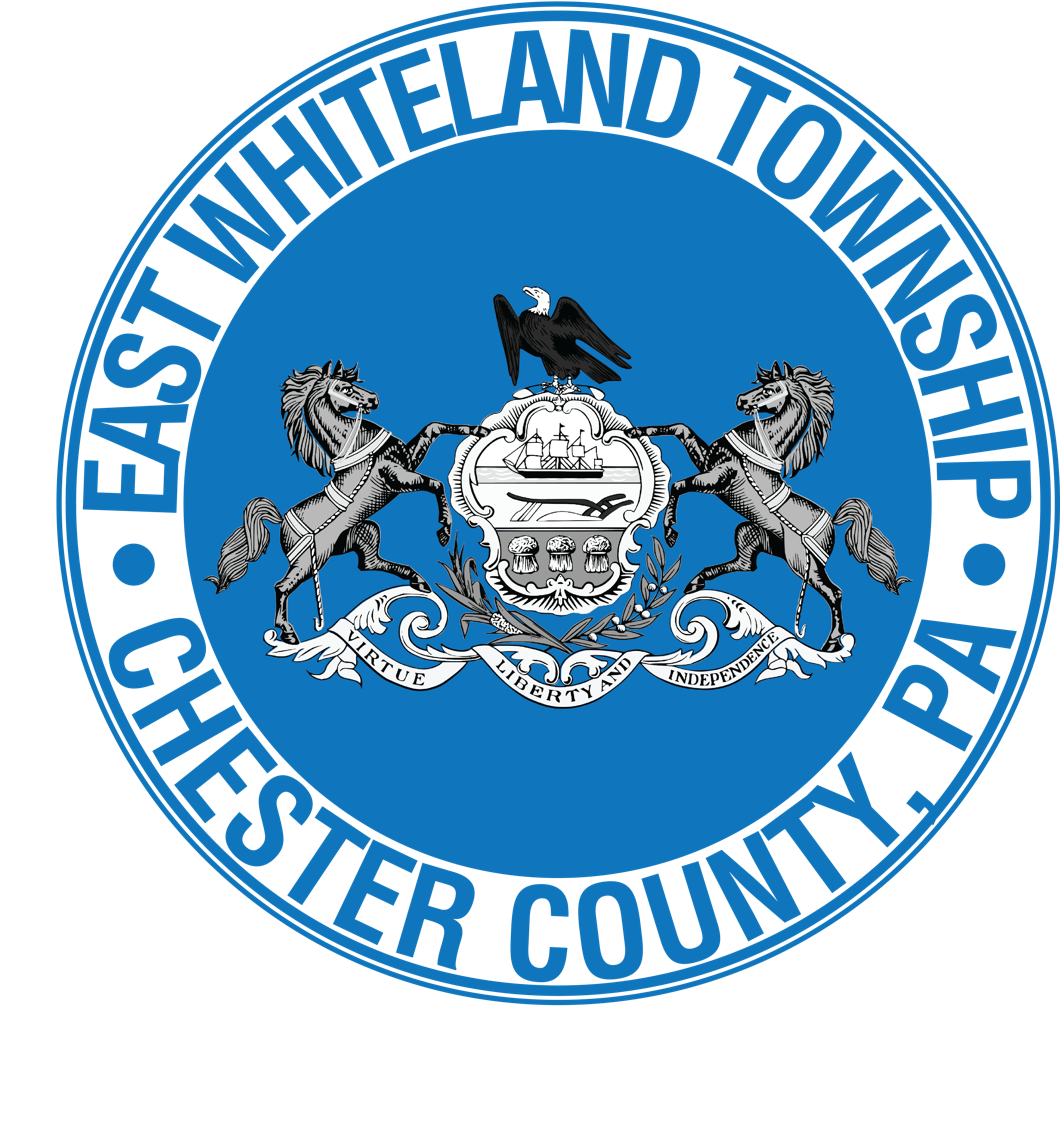
- Seal Logo
- Motto: "The Heart of Great Valley"
- Location in Chester County and the state of Pennsylvania.

- Location of Pennsylvania in the United States
- Coordinates: 40°02′20″N 75°33′18″W
- Country: United States
- State: Pennsylvania
- County: Chester
- Founded: 1704
- Named for: Whitland

Government
  - Type: Board of Supervisors
  - Supervisor: Scott Lambert
  - Supervisor: Peter Fixler
  - Supervisor: Clinton Smith

Area
  - Total: 11.00 sq mi (28.50 km^{2})
  - Land: 10.93 sq mi (28.32 km^{2})
  - Water: 0.066 sq mi (0.17 km^{2})
- Elevation: 427 ft (130 m)

Population (2010)
  - Total: 10,650
  - Estimate (2016): 11,517
  - Density: 1,053.2/sq mi (406.64/km^{2})
- Time zone: UTC-5 (EST)
  - Summer (DST): UTC-4 (EDT)
- Area code: 610
- FIPS code: 42-029-22056
- Website: www.eastwhiteland.org

East Whiteland Township is a township in Chester County, Pennsylvania, United States. The population was 13,913 at the 2020 Census. Mailing addresses associated with East Whiteland include Malvern, Frazer, and a small area of Exton.

== History ==
Founded in 1704, Whiteland Township was made up of what is today known as East and West Whiteland townships. The first European settlers were Welsh. The name Whiteland came from Whitford Garden in Flintshire, Wales. Whiteland Township was divided into two townships in 1765.

Native Americans called the area "The Dark Valley" because of the numerous trees and undergrowth. During the American Revolution, General George Washington and many of his troops camped at Malin Hall here. They were preparing for a September 16, 1777, encounter with British General William Howe. The Continental Army also camped near White Horse Inn on Swedesford Road. Because of bad weather, however, the "Battle of the Clouds" had to be aborted.

The Lapp Log House, St. Peter's Church in the Great Valley, Spring Mill Complex, and White Horse Tavern are listed on the National Register of Historic Places.

== Geography ==
According to the United States Census Bureau, the township has a total area of 11.0 square miles (28 km^{2}), of which 0.04 square miles (0.10 km^{2}), or 0.27%, is water. East Whiteland Township is located about 25 miles (40 km) west of Philadelphia.

The township has a ridge of hills along its northern and southern boundaries. These constitute the valley walls of the Great Valley, which runs generally west to east toward the Schuylkill River. In the center of the township, there is a somewhat uneven valley floor. The Great Valley contains a number of streams, including Valley Creek and Little Valley Creek, which is a narrow stream that goes across land and woodlands.

== Demographics ==
Historical population
Census	Pop.	Note	%±
1930	1,334		—
1940	1,290		−3.3%
1950	1,740		34.9%
1960	5,078		191.8%
1970	7,242		42.6%
1980	8,468		16.9%
1990	8,398		−0.8%
2000	9,333		11.1%
2010	10,650		14.1%
2020	13,917		30.7%

At the 2010 census, the township was 77.1% non-Hispanic White, 3.3% Black or African American, 0.2% Native American, 11.6% Asian, and 1.5% were two or more races. 6.9% of the population were of Hispanic or Latino ancestry.

As of the census of 2000, there were 9,333 people, 3,254 households, and 2,255 families residing in the township. The population density was 848.6 inhabitants per square mile (327.6/km^{2}). There were 3,460 housing units at an average density of 314.6 per square mile (121.5/km^{2}). The racial makeup of the township was 89.57% White, 3.28% African American, 0.09% Native American, 4.98% Asian, 0.04% Pacific Islander, 0.73% from other races, and 1.31% from two or more races. Hispanic or Latino of any race were 2.42% of the population.

There were 3,254 households, out of which 34.9% had children under the age of 18 living with them, 58.3% were married couples living together, 7.7% had a female householder with no husband present, and 30.7% were non-families. 24.4% of all households were made up of individuals, and 5.8% had someone living alone who was 65 years of age or older. The average household size was 2.59 and the average family size was 3.13.

In the township the population was spread out, with 24.0% under the age of 18, 8.5% from 18 to 24, 29.6% from 25 to 44, 23.6% from 45 to 64, and 14.3% who were 65 years of age or older. The median age was 38 years. For every 100 females, there were 84.1 males. For every 100 females age 18 and over, there were 79.6 males.

The median income for a household in the township was $69,500, and the median income for a family was $75,818. Males had a median income of $55,969 versus $35,507 for females. The per capita income for the township was $30,258. About 3.9% of families and 4.7% of the population were below the poverty line, including 3.6% of those under age 18 and 6.5% of those age 65 or over.

== Economy ==
Home to the Great Valley Corporate Center, the township also serves as U.S headquarters to several national and international firms including Siemens Health Services (formerly SMS), Vishay, SCT, Centocor and Aegon, as well as being home to numerous smaller businesses and retail shops. The Frazer Diner is a 1929 diner on U.S. Route 30 in Frazer.

Acme Markets has its headquarters in the township.

== Education ==
The Great Valley School District serves as the public education for the township. The public schools serving the township are Kathryn D. Markley Elementary, Great Valley Middle School, and Great Valley High School. Penn State has a graduate center here, Penn State Great Valley. LeBow College of Drexel University and Immaculata University are located in the township.

== Government ==
East Whiteland Township is a second-class township governed by a three-member Board of Supervisors who are elected at-large for a six year term. The day-to-day operations of the township are run by the township manager, who is appointed by the Board.

== Transportation ==
=== Roads and highways ===
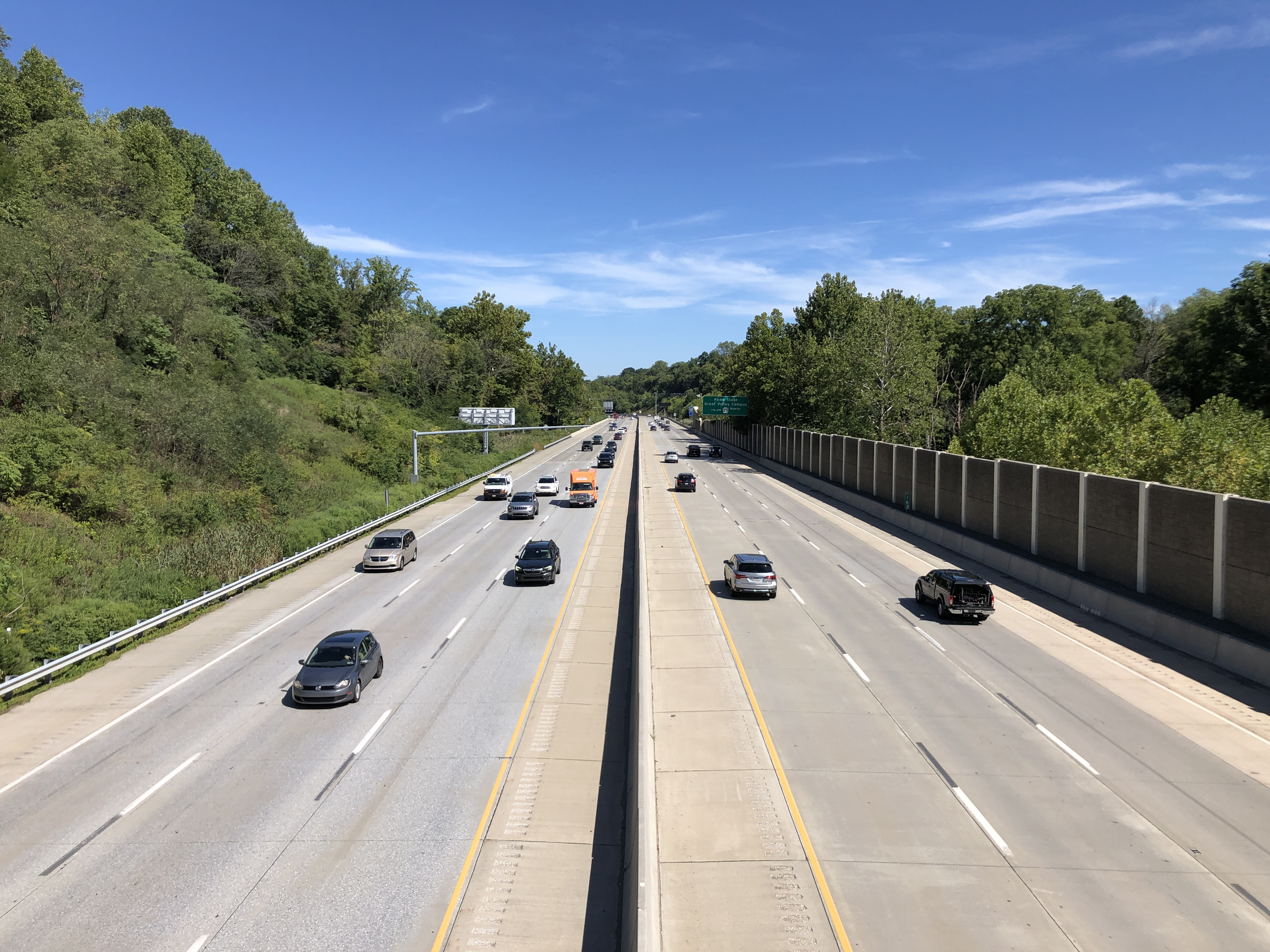
US 202 northbound in East Whiteland Township

As of 2018, there were 69.14 miles (111.27 km) of public roads in East Whiteland Township, of which 22.11 miles (35.58 km) were maintained by the Pennsylvania Department of Transportation (PennDOT) and 47.03 miles (75.69 km) were maintained by the township.

U.S. Route 202 is the main highway serving East Whiteland Township. It follows a southwest-northeast alignment through the central portion of the township. U.S. Route 30 follows Lancaster Avenue along a southwest-northeast alignment through the southern portion of the township. Pennsylvania Route 29 follows Morehall Road and Charlestown Road northwest from US 30 across the northeastern portion of the township. Pennsylvania Route 352 follows Sproul Road southeast from US 30 across the southern part of the township. Finally, Pennsylvania Route 401 follows Conestoga Road northwest from US 30 through central and western portions of the township.

=== Public transportation ===
The former main line of the Pennsylvania Railroad, currently owned and operated by Amtrak and also used by SEPTA, passes through the township. While no stations are located in the township, SEPTA Frazer Yard is a maintenance facility for the Paoli/Thorndale Line regional rail service. In 2019, the Delaware Valley Regional Planning Commission conducted a feasibility study for a new SEPTA station in East Whiteland and recommended a location near Immaculata University.

SEPTA suburban bus route 92 runs along King Road from West Chester to King of Prussia, while route 204 runs along US 30 between Lionville and Paoli.
