= Newtown Township, Delaware County, Pennsylvania =

Township in Pennsylvania, US

Newtown Township
- Township
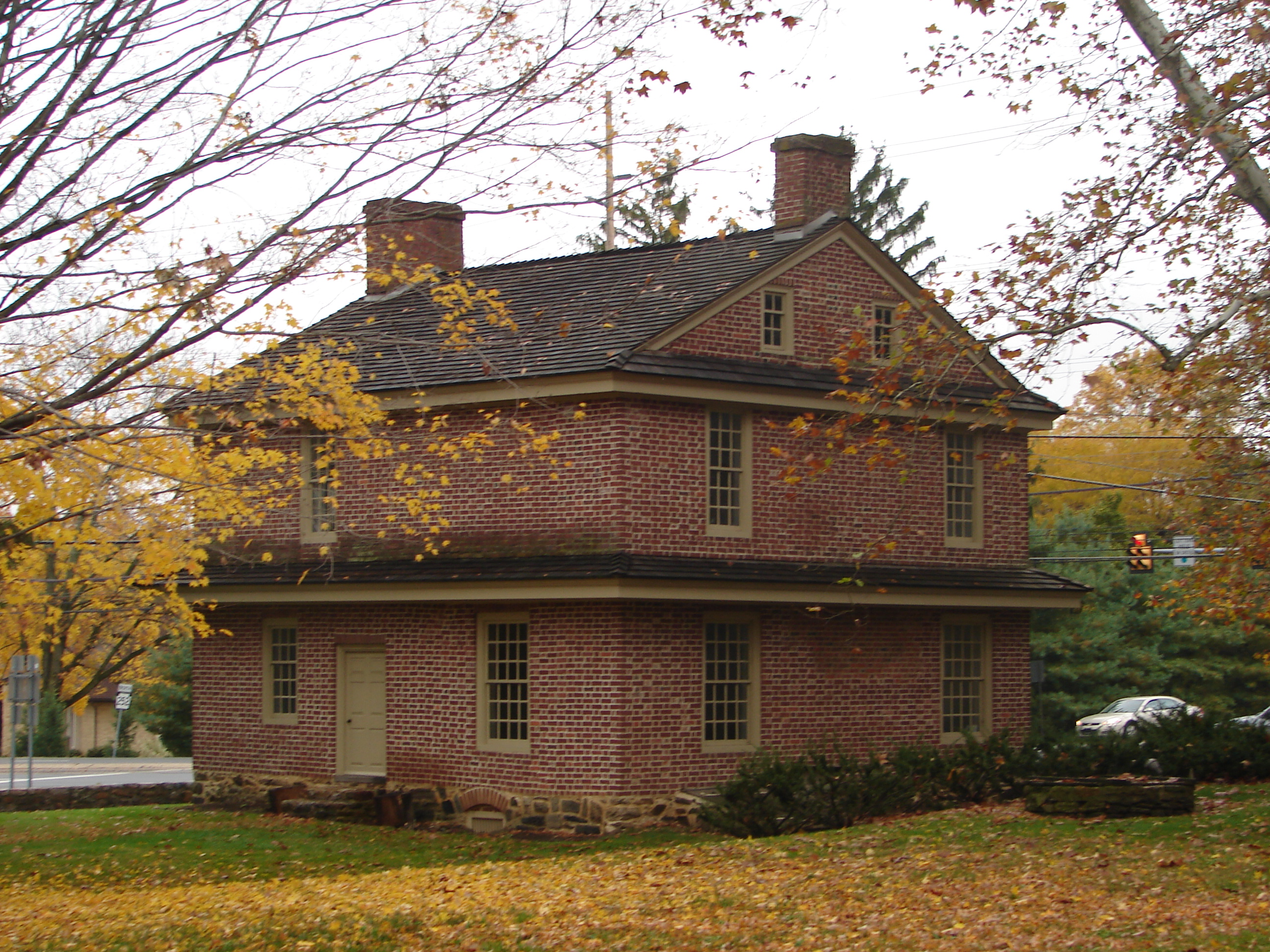
- The Square Tavern

- Seal

- Location in Delaware County and the state of Pennsylvania

- Location of Pennsylvania in the United States
- Coordinates: 39°59′25″N 75°24′14″W
- Country: United States
- State: Pennsylvania
- County: Delaware
- Settled: 1681
- Incorporated: 1684

Area
  - Total: 10.09 sq mi (26.13 km^{2})
  - Land: 10.02 sq mi (25.95 km^{2})
  - Water: 0.073 sq mi (0.19 km^{2})
- Elevation: 384 ft (117 m)

Population (2020)
  - Total: 15,002
  - Density: 1,497.3/sq mi (578.11/km^{2})
- Time zone: UTC-5 (EST)
  - Summer (DST): UTC-4 (EDT)
- ZIP Code: 19073
- Area codes: 610 and 484
- FIPS code: 42-045-54224
- Website: www.newtowntownship.org

Newtown Township, also referred to by the name of its post office of Newtown Square, is a township in Delaware County, Pennsylvania, United States. Prior to 1789, it was part of Chester County, along with the rest of Delaware County. As of the 2020 census, the population was 15,002.

== History ==
The first mention of the township was in 1684, when Thomas Norbury and John Humphrey were appointed collectors of the "Levie for the cort house and Prison for ye Township of Newtowne". Newtown Square was the name used for the townstead with the majority of early settlers being Welshmen. These Welsh "Friends" (Quakers) needed a road to facilitate their journey to meeting, the only established road at the time being Newtown Street Road, which ran north and south. As such, in 1687, an east–west road was laid out (Goshen Road) so the Friends could attend either Goshen or the Haverford Friends Meeting. By 1696, these friends had become numerous enough to hold their own meeting in Newtown and continued to meet in a private home until the completion of the Newtown Square Friends Meetinghouse in 1711. In the 18th century, Newtown was basically a farming community. Blacksmith and wheelwright shops emerged on the main arteries to service horse and buggy travelers. Taverns and inns were also opened to accommodate local patrons as well as drovers taking their livestock to the markets in Philadelphia.

During the Revolutionary War, Newtown township was visited several times by foraging parties of the British Army. On Goshen Road, west of Newtown Square, were the outpost and headquarters of General Potter.

During the 19th century a number of mills sprang up along Crum Creek (the western border) and Darby Creek (in the northeast corner of the Township). These included saw mills, paper mills, shingle mills, and a woolen factory. In the Darby Creek area a number of tenement houses were built as well as a general store to service the needs of the mill workers.

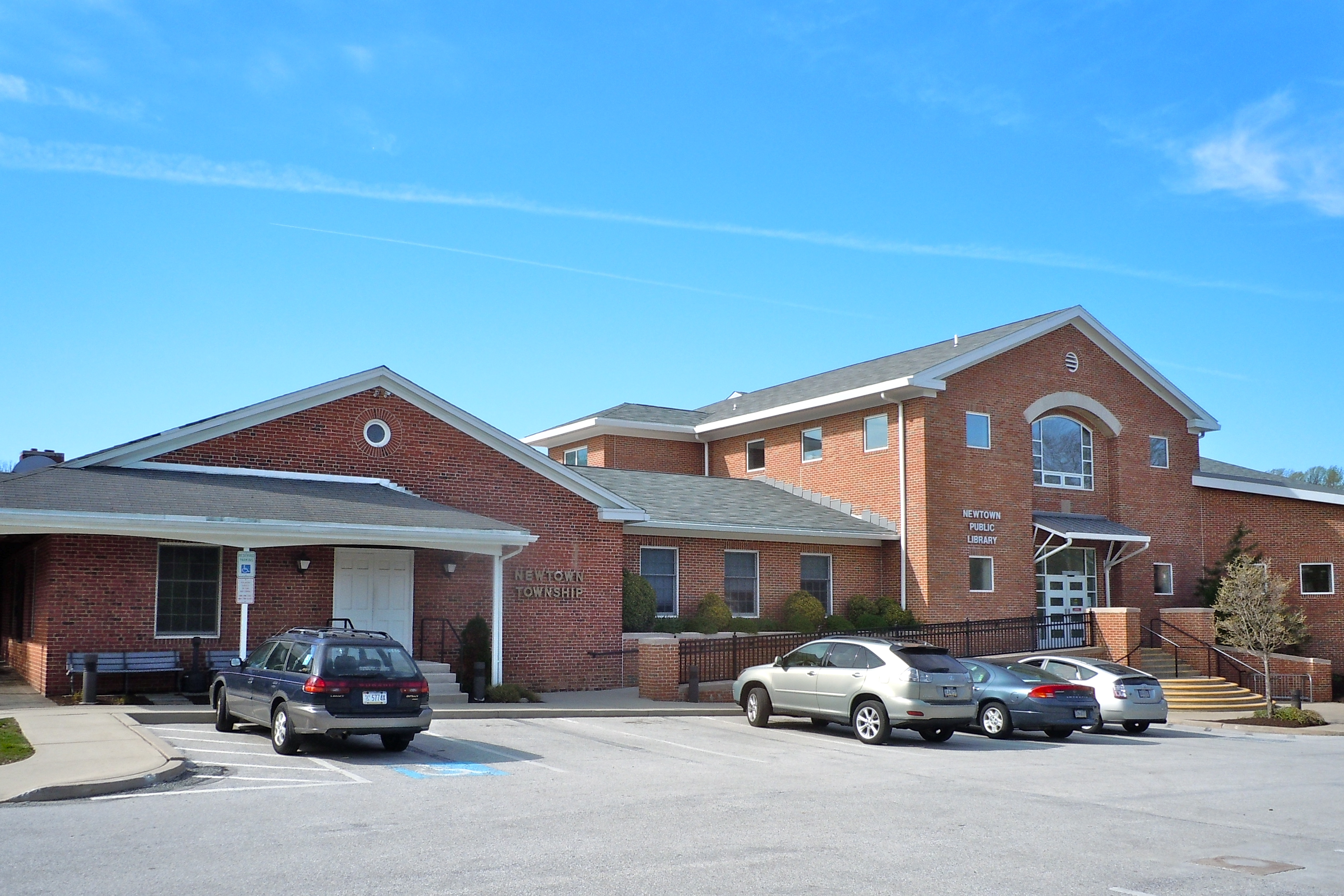
Municipal Building and library

In 1860, the population of Newtown Township was 830; the population of Philadelphia was approximately half a million. At this time, the railroad was laying track out of Philadelphia in all directions with services to Chester, Media, West Chester, and Radnor, but not Newtown Square. As these towns, as well as stops along the way, grew and prospered, mills closed and businesses declined in Newtown Square. By 1890, the population had fallen to 648.

As an agricultural community, stone farmhouses graced the country landscape throughout the 19th century. Additions were made to the early simple dwellings as families grew and more living space was required. Prosperity, due to a growing market, also enabled property owners to make additions, not only to their own homes, but on the property as well as in the form of tenements and outbuildings.

In 1859, the Rose Tree Hunt Club was organized south of the township, followed by the Lima Hunt Club to the west (1885) and the Radnor Hunt Club at the intersection of Darby-Paoli and Goshen Roads in 1886. With these developments, many country estates were built in the rolling hills of Newtown Square for "either country gentlemen of Old Quaker blood ... or rich Philadelphians who loved hunting, owned good horses, and were not afraid to ride them." Major transportation developments for the Township did not occur until the mid-1890s, when trolley service was opened to Newtown Square. Before this time, railroad lines had been proposed, but due to a series of reorganizations and competition between companies for rights of way, as of 1892 no track had been laid. In 1894, however, a mule-drawn service was initiated by the Philadelphia and Delaware County Railroad, with steam dummies used to help out on the hills. Electrification was completed the following year and the trolley was open from Newtown to Fernwood in 1895. By 1889, the reorganized Philadelphia and West Chester Traction Company had completed the track to West Chester.

At the turn of the 20th century, the automobile began to disperse the urban populations over the countryside. The trolleys, along with automobiles transformed the country farmers into suburban commuters. Farms were sold and the land subdivided. Newtown Square boomed. Many city dwellers retained their country estates; however, these became hidden amidst gridiron developments. Although construction slackened during the depression, another boom was experienced after World War II.

Today Newtown Township has a land area of 10.11 square miles (26.2 km^{2}), and a population of 15,002 individuals. Some farms and large estates remain, but for the most part, the township was developed into a suburban community with old stone homes and structures dotting the landscape to serve as reminders of days gone by.

=== Historic sites ===
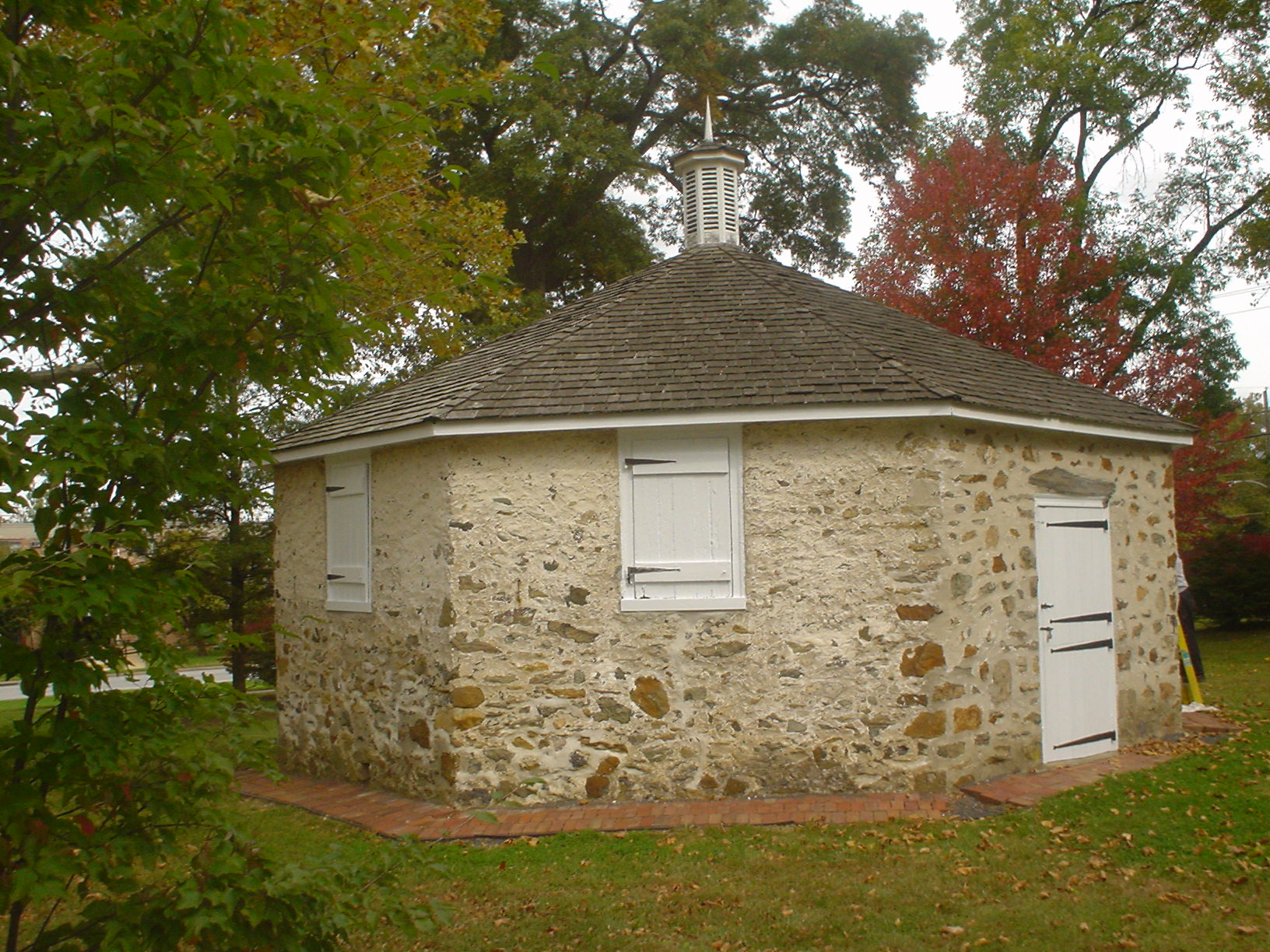
Octagonal School House

Five sites in Newtown are listed on the National Register of Historic Places:

- Hood Octagonal School (1842) – the last eight-sided one-room school house in Delaware County. Located on West Chester Pike on the grounds of Dunwoody Village.
- Bartram's Covered Bridge (1860) – the last remaining covered bridge in Delaware County (spanning Crum Creek – connecting with Chester County), located at Goshen and Boot roads. Restored in 1996.
- Old St. David's Church (1715) – the oldest non-Quaker church in Delaware County, founded by Welsh Anglicans; burial place of General "Mad" Anthony Wayne, located on S. Valley Forge Road in the very corner of the Township. In March 1880, Henry Wadsworth Longfellow attended the church and wrote the poem "Old St. David's at Radnor".
- Square Tavern (1742) – also known as "The Square Inn" and "John West House" – the childhood site of famous American painter Benjamin West, restored in 1981 and again in 2008, located at the corner of Newtown Street Road (Rt. 252) and Goshen Roads
- Paper Mill House (1770, 1845) – mill workers' home and general store, restored in the 1980s and now used as museum and headquarters for the Newtown Square Historical Society. Located at St. David's and Paper Mill Roads.

== Government ==
Newtown is classified as a second class township, having a Board of Supervisors of five members. Supervisors are elected at large by the all registered voting residents of the town for overlapping six-year terms. The board sets policies for the municipality given under the Pennsylvania Second Class Township Code. The current board consists of Chair Leonard B. Altieri, III, Esq., Vice Chair Paul Sanfrancesco, Supervisor Mike Russo Jr., Supervisor Kathryn V. Chandless, Esq., and Supervisor Cheryl Grosso.

Appointed boards and commissions include the Bartram Bridge Joint Preservation Commission (Jointly operated with Willistown Township, each with 3 commissioners), Environmental Advisory Council, Leisure Services Commission (jointly operated with Marple Township), Library Board, Municipal Authority (Sewer), Parks and Recreation Board, Planning Commission, Zoning Hearing Board, Strategic Plan Advisory Committee, Shade Tree Commission, Finance Committee, Trails and Greenways Committee, and Historical Preservation Committee.

Appointed officials are hired by the Board of Supervisors as employees to carry out the decisions of the Board. These bipartisan officials include the Township Manager, who is the Chief Administrative Officer and Treasurer of the township, a position currently held by Stephen Nease. Other appointed officials include Township Solicitor, Richard Sokorai, Township Engineer, Eric Johnson P.E, and Sewage Enforcement Officer, Jamie MacCombie.

== Demographics ==
Historical population
Census	Pop.	Note	%±
1930	1,541		—
1940	1,949		26.5%
1950	3,518		80.5%
1960	9,270		163.5%
1970	11,081		19.5%
1980	11,775		6.3%
1990	11,366		−3.5%
2000	11,700		2.9%
2010	12,216		4.4%
2020	15,002		22.8%

As of the 2020 census, 14,369 residents identified themselves as one race alone, 13,200 as White (87.98%), 259 as African American (1.72%), 14 as Native American or Alaska Native (0.09%), 792 as Asian (5.28%), 3 as Native Hawaiian and Other Pacific Islander (0.02%), 101 as from other races (0.67%), and 633 from two or more races (4.21%) As of 2010, Hispanic or Latino of any race were 1.2% of the population.

As of the census of 2000, there were 11,700 people, 4,549 households, and 3,184 families residing in the township. The population density was 1,166.0 inhabitants per square mile (450.2/km^{2}). There were 4,690 housing units at an average density of 467.4 per square mile (180.5/km^{2}). The racial makeup of the township was 96.16% White, 0.66% African American, 0.07% Native American, 2.30% Asian, 0.13% from other races, and 0.68% from two or more races. Hispanic or Latino of any race were 0.69% of the population.

There were 4,549 households, out of which 27.6% had children under the age of 18 living with them, 60.4% were married couples living together, 7.2% had a female householder with no husband present, and 30.0% were non-families. 27.2% of all households were made up of individuals, and 15.9% had someone living alone who was 65 years of age or older. The average household size was 2.50 and the average family size was 3.06.

In the township the population was spread out, with 23.1% under the age of 18, 4.9% from 18 to 24, 24.4% from 25 to 44, 25.6% from 45 to 64, and 21.9% who were 65 years of age or older. The median age was 43 years. For every 100 females, there were 88.9 males. For every 100 females age 18 and over, there were 83.2 males.

The median income for a household in the township was $65,924, and the median income for a family was $82,557. Males had a median income of $61,688 versus $37,319 for females. The per capita income for the township was $39,364. About 1.8% of families and 3.5% of the population were below the poverty line, including 2.6% of those under age 18 and 3.9% of those age 65 or over.

== Geography ==
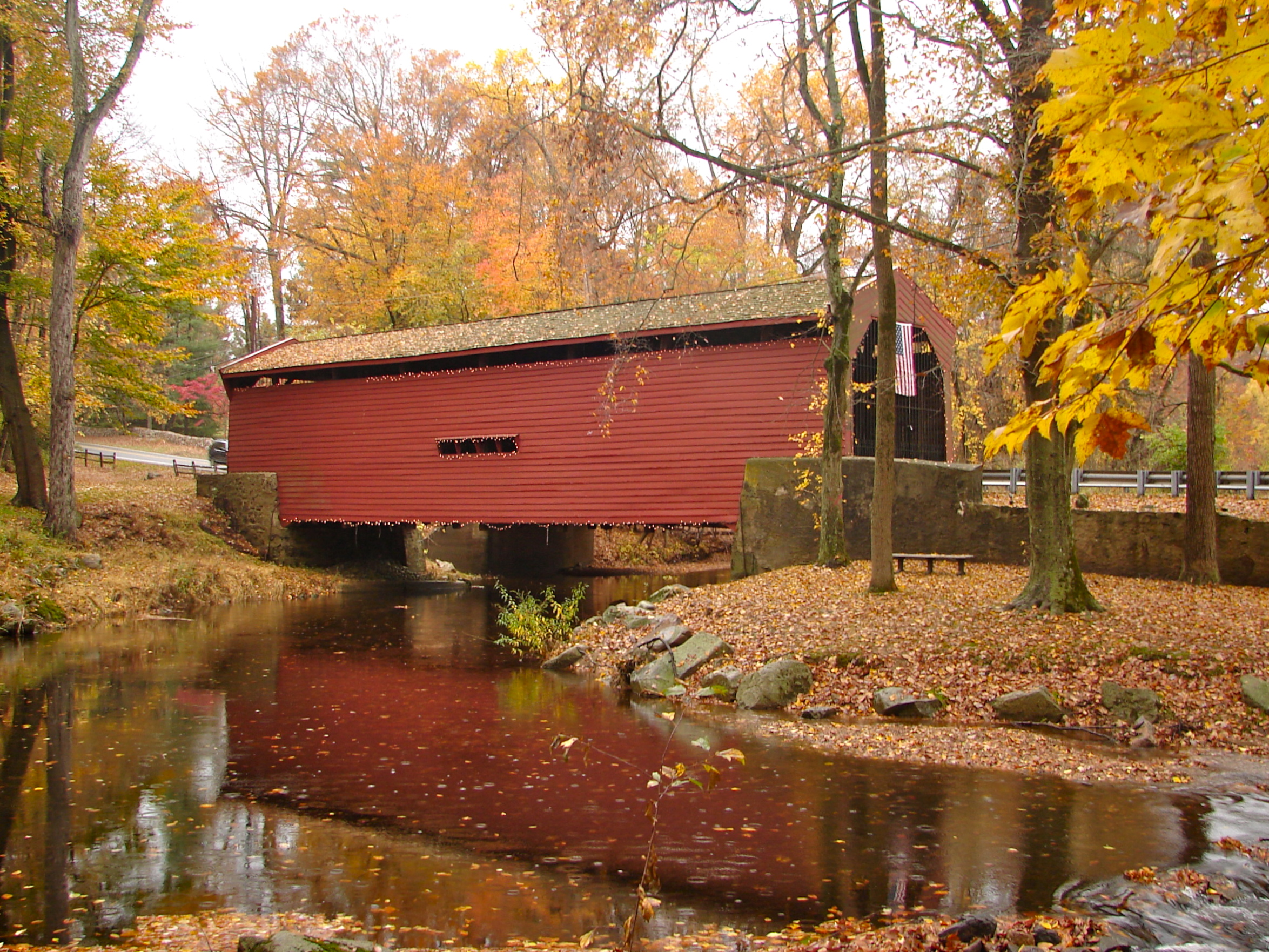
Bartram's Covered Bridge, over Crum Creek on the western border of Newtown Township

According to the U.S. Census Bureau, the township has a total area of 10.1 square miles (26 km^{2}), of which 10.0 square miles (26 km^{2}) is land and 0.1 square miles (0.26 km^{2}) (0.69%) is water. Its villages include Echo Valley, Florida Park, Larchmont (also in Marple Township,) Newtown Square, and Wyola.

=== Adjacent municipalities ===
- Radnor Township – northeast
- Marple Township – southeast
- Upper Providence Township – south
- Edgmont Township – southwest
- Willistown Township, Chester County – west
- Easttown Township, Chester County – northwest

Waterways in Newtown township include Crum Creek and Darby Creek. The township is bordered by the Springton Lake reservoir to the south.

=== Climate ===
Newtown Township has a hot-summer humid continental climate (Dfa) and the hardiness zone is 7a.

Climate data for Newtown Square (Elevation: 456 ft (139 m)) 1981-2010 Averages
Month	Jan	Feb	Mar	Apr	May	Jun	Jul	Aug	Sep	Oct	Nov	Dec	Year
Mean daily maximum °F (°C)	38.6 (3.7)	41.8 (5.4)	50.4 (10.2)	62.3 (16.8)	72.1 (22.3)	81.0 (27.2)	85.3 (29.6)	83.5 (28.6)	76.8 (24.9)	65.5 (18.6)	54.1 (12.3)	42.6 (5.9)	62.9 (17.2)
Daily mean °F (°C)	30.4 (−0.9)	33.1 (0.6)	40.6 (4.8)	51.6 (10.9)	61.2 (16.2)	70.5 (21.4)	75.2 (24.0)	73.7 (23.2)	66.3 (19.1)	55.0 (12.8)	44.8 (7.1)	34.6 (1.4)	53.2 (11.8)
Mean daily minimum °F (°C)	22.2 (−5.4)	24.3 (−4.3)	30.9 (−0.6)	40.8 (4.9)	50.2 (10.1)	60.0 (15.6)	65.1 (18.4)	63.8 (17.7)	55.7 (13.2)	44.4 (6.9)	35.5 (1.9)	26.6 (−3.0)	43.4 (6.3)
Average precipitation inches (mm)	3.36 (85)	2.80 (71)	3.89 (99)	3.84 (98)	4.08 (104)	3.94 (100)	4.71 (120)	3.88 (99)	4.65 (118)	3.87 (98)	3.61 (92)	3.89 (99)	46.52 (1,182)
Average relative humidity (%)	68.3	65.0	60.5	59.4	63.2	68.2	68.2	70.5	71.7	70.5	69.7	70.8	67.2
Average dew point °F (°C)	21.2 (−6.0)	22.6 (−5.2)	28.0 (−2.2)	37.9 (3.3)	48.6 (9.2)	59.5 (15.3)	64.0 (17.8)	63.5 (17.5)	56.9 (13.8)	45.6 (7.6)	35.5 (1.9)	26.1 (−3.3)	42.5 (5.8)
Source: PRISM

== Transportation ==
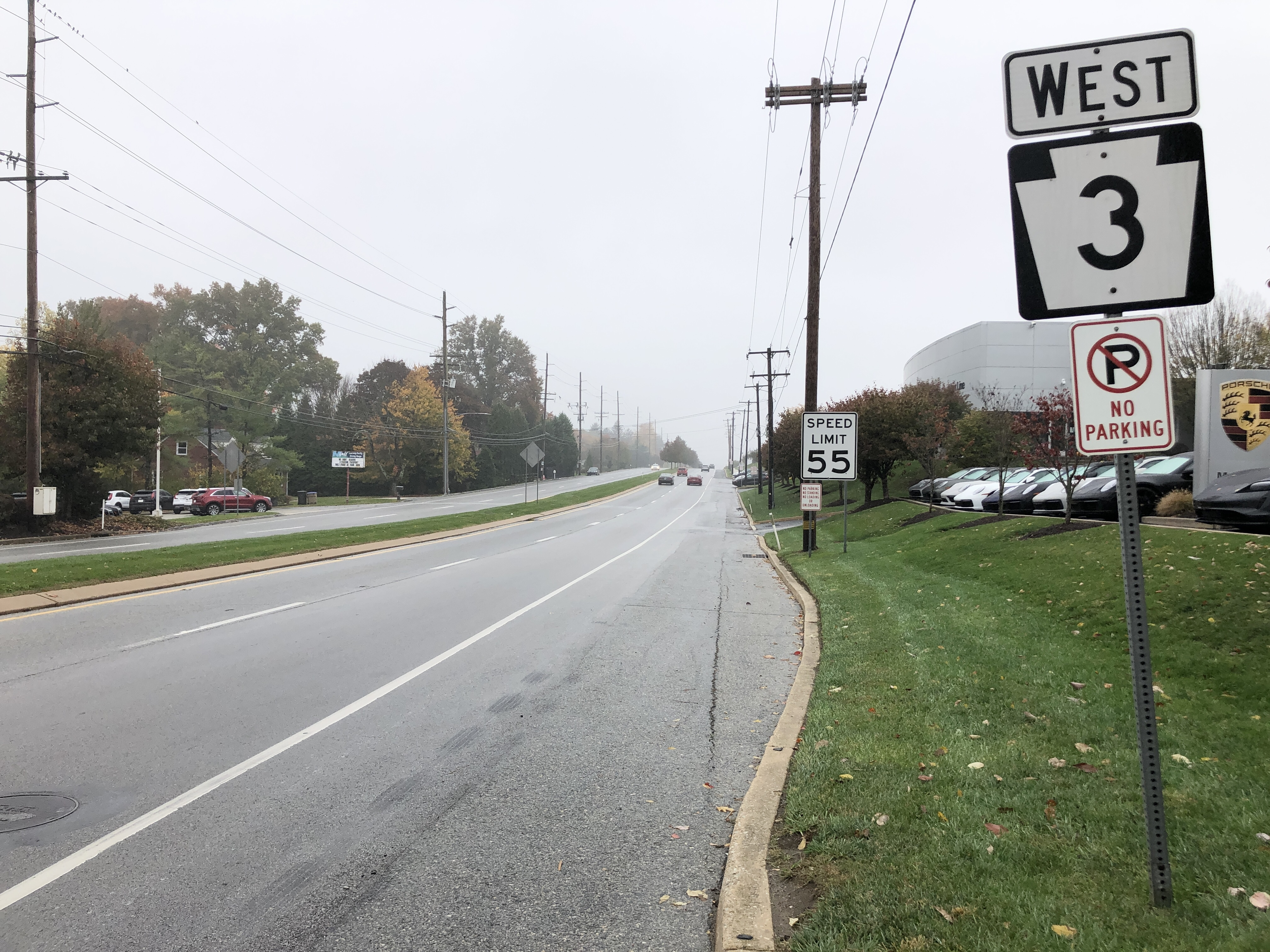
PA 3 westbound in Newtown Township

As of 2020, there were 68.66 miles (110.50 km) of public roads in Newtown Township, of which 15.78 miles (25.40 km) were maintained by Pennsylvania Department of Transportation (PennDOT) and 52.88 miles (85.10 km) were maintained by the township.

The main east–west road in Newtown Township is Pennsylvania Route 3, which follows West Chester Pike and heads west to West Chester and east to Philadelphia. The main north–south road in Newtown Township is Pennsylvania Route 252, which follows Newtown Street Road and heads south to Media and north to Paoli. Routes 3 and 252 meet in Newtown Square.

SEPTA provides Suburban Bus service to Newtown Township along Route 104, which follows West Chester Pike through the township on its route between West Chester and 69th Street Transportation Center in Upper Darby; Route 112, which follows Media Line Road in the eastern part of the township on its route between Delaware County Community College and the 69th Street Transportation Center; Route 115, which offers weekday service along Media Line Road on its route between Delaware Community College and the Darby Transportation Center in Darby and the Philadelphia International Airport; Route 118, which heads south from Newtown Square along Newtown Street Road to Media and the Chester Transit Center in Chester; and Route 120, which follows West Chester Pike through the township on its route between Cheyney University and the 69th Street Transportation Center.

Newtown Township was formerly served by the Newtown Square Branch of the Pennsylvania Railroad; rail service to Newtown Square ended in 1963 and the tracks were removed in 1985. The Route 104 bus replaced a trolley service that connected West Chester to Philadelphia along the West Chester Pike between 1898 and the 1950s.

== Arts and culture ==
Places of worship include St. David's Episcopal Church, directly split on the border of Newtown and Radnor Townships, whose graveyard and buildings begin in 1715, are listed on the National Register of Historic Places. The graveyard contains one of the graves of Revolutionary War hero General Mad Anthony Wayne. The Newtown Square Friends Meeting House and Burying Ground is the oldest place of worship in Newtown. The original Quaker settlers built the Meeting House in 1711, and then it was greatly expanded and "modernized" in 1791. The architectural ghost of the original 1711 doorway and one of the original windows can be seen in the stone infill in the north wall of the expanded Meeting House. The Meeting House is still in use for worship on "First Day". Saint Anastasia Parish was founded in 1912 to serve the small Catholic population. In 1930, a Catholic school was opened. Post-World War II, the church and school expanded to serve the rapidly growing Catholic population of Newtown Square.

== Education ==
Newtown Township lies entirely within the Marple Newtown School District together with Marple Township. The district has four elementary schools, one middle school, and one high school. Culbertson Elementary School is the only one of the four elementary Schools which serves residents of and resides in Newtown Township. Marple Newtown Senior High School lies within township borders on Media Line Road.

Numerous private and parochial schools are located within Newtown Township, such as Episcopal Academy and Delaware County Christian School.

The township is served by the Newtown Public Library.

== Economy ==
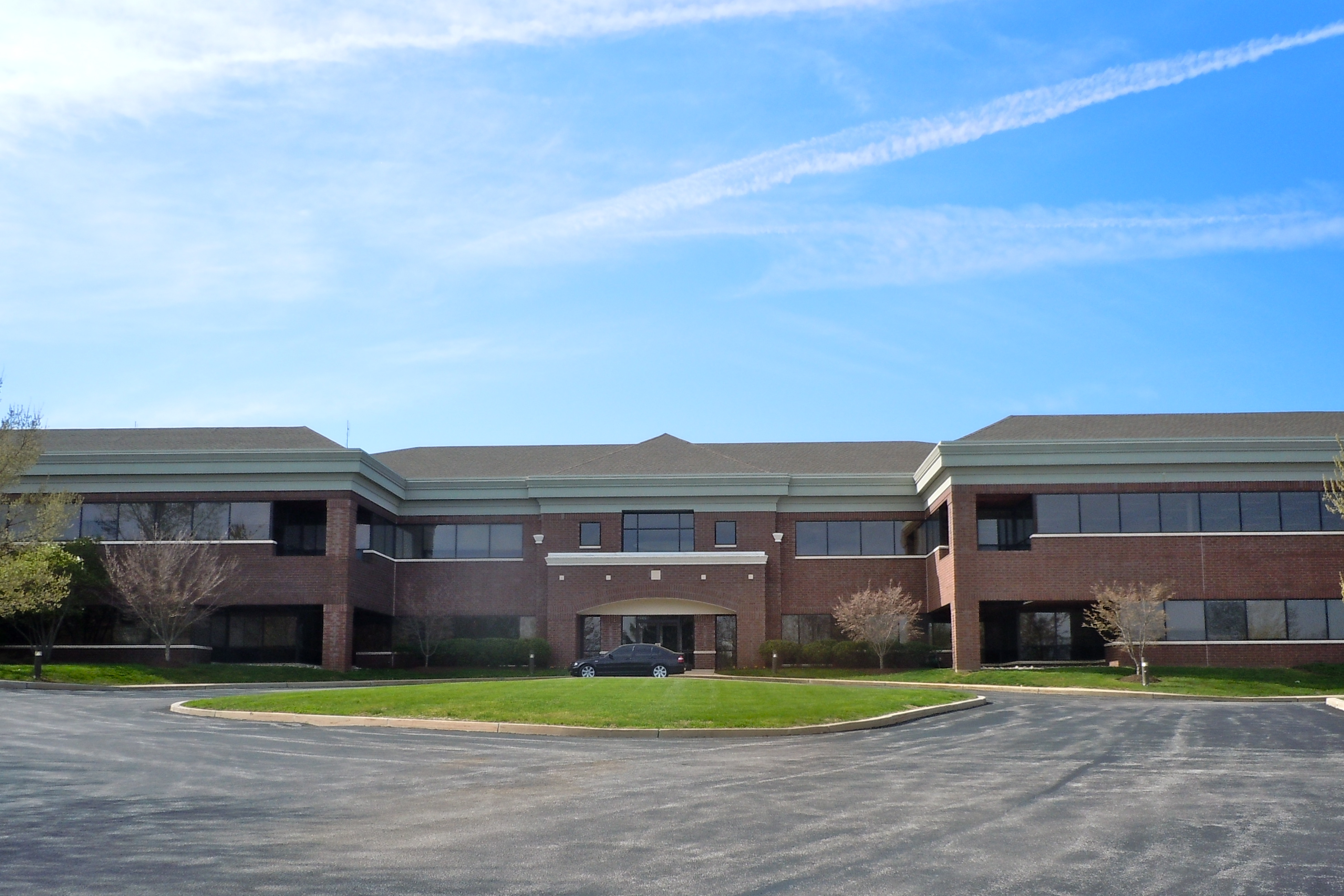
Apple Leisure Group Headquarters

The township is home to the Project Management Institute (PMI), a Lyondell Chemical Company Technology Center, and Apple Leisure Group, which also includes AMResorts and Apple Vacations.

The headquarters of SAP America, a subsidiary of SAP SE, is located in Newtown. SAP America has around 3,000 employees in the area. SAP America has around 19,300 employees in United States.

== Attractions ==
The Newtown Square Railroad Museum is located inside of the former Pennsylvania Railroad's Newtown Square Station and features a small model train layout, a former Red Arrow trolley, a vintage steam locomotive, and various other artifacts preserving the history of the Newtown Square Branch.

== In popular culture ==
The Du Pont Foxcatcher Farm estate was located in Newtown Square. Following John Du Pont's murder of Olympic wrestler Dave Schultz in 1996, Du Pont was arrested by the Newtown Township Police Department. The events were made into the 2014 film Foxcatcher.

Aronimink Golf Club is located within Newtown Square. The course is considered one of the nation's top golf courses. The club hosted the 1962 PGA Championship, 1977 U.S. Amateur Championship, 1997 U.S. Junior Amateur Championship, 2003 Senior PGA Championship, the 2010 and 2011 AT&T National, the 2018 BMW Championship, 2020 Women's PGA Championship, and the 2026 PGA Championship.

== Notable people ==
Those of note who were born or once lived in Newtown.

- Michael Barkann (resident): Sports host, anchor and reporter for NBC Sports Philadelphia.
- Ernest Bender (resident): Argentine-American Academic. University of Pennsylvania professor of Indo-Aryan languages and literature. Lived in Newtown until his death.
- Smedley Butler (resident): U.S. Marine Corps, two-time Medal of Honor recipient and anti-war activist. Lived in Newtown upon his retirement until his death.
- Pat Chambers (born): College basketball coach. Head coach of men's basketball team at Florida Gulf Coast. Former head coach at Penn State and Boston University.
- Joey Crawford (resident): Basketball referee for NBA (1977–2016).
- Louis de Moll (resident): Architect, prominent primarily in the Philadelphia area. Died in a retirement home in Newtown.
- John Du Pont (resident): Convicted murderer and philanthropist. Heir to the Du Pont family and murderer of Olympian wrestler David Schultz.
- Mia Dillon (resident): Actress, Tony (1982) and Drama Desk (1980) award nominee.
- John Anderson Fry (resident): Current president of Temple University, former president of Drexel University and Franklin & Marshall College.
- Rajiv L. Gupta (resident): Indian-American businessman, chairman of Aptiv, former executive of Rohm and Haas.
- Cole Hamels (resident c. 2014–2021): Retired Professional baseball pitcher for the Philadelphia Phillies (2006–2015), Texas Rangers (2015–2018), Chicago Cubs (2018–2019), and Atlanta Braves (2020).
- Harry Harris (resident): British-born geneticist and biochemist, University of Pennsylvania professor. Lived in retirement community Dunwoody Village, and died in Newtown.
- Edward Hunter (born): Third Presiding Bishop of the Church of Jesus Christ of Latter-day Saints (LDS Church) from 1851 until his death in 1883. He served as Presiding Bishop longer than any other person in the history of the LDS Church.
- Willem Johan Kolff (resident): Dutch-American inventor, pioneer of hemodialysis, artificial heart, and artificial organs. Lived in Newtown from his retirement in 1996 until his death.
- Bill Maas (born): Former American football defensive tackle for the Kansas City Chiefs (1984–1992) and the Green Bay Packers (1993).
- Sean Payton (resident): American football head coach, currently with the Denver Broncos. Lived in Newtown from 1970 to 1978 during elementary and middle school.
- Frederic Pryor (resident): Economist and professor at Swarthmore College. Imprisoned in East Berlin in 1961 for six months until released in a "spy swap". Lived in Newtown from 2008 until his death in 2019.
- George Rochberg (resident): Contemporary classical composer, University of Pennsylvania music department chairman (1960–1968) and professor.
- Alexandra Tolstaya (resident): Youngest daughter and secretary of the noted Russian novelist Leo Tolstoy. Lived in Newtown Square during the 1930s before moving to New York in 1940.
- Benjamin West (resident): British-American artist, painter of works such as The Death of Nelson, The Death of General Wolfe, the Treaty of Paris, and Benjamin Franklin Drawing Electricity from the Sky. West grew up in Newtown, his father, John West, was the proprietor of the Square Tavern.
