= Newtown Square Friends Meeting House =

Quaker meeting house in Pennsylvania, USA

Coordinates: 39°59′30″N 75°24′18″W

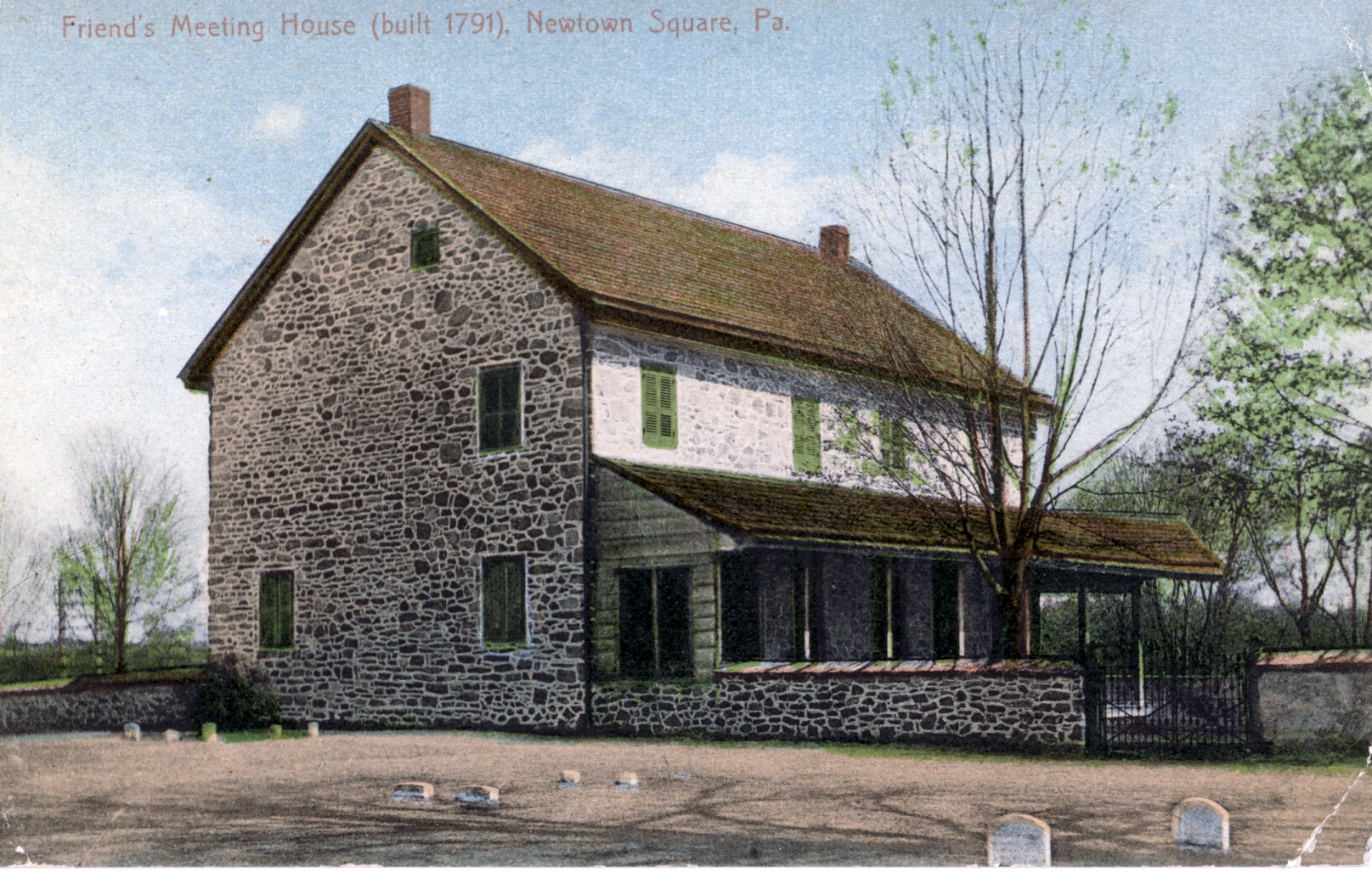
Postcard c. 1912

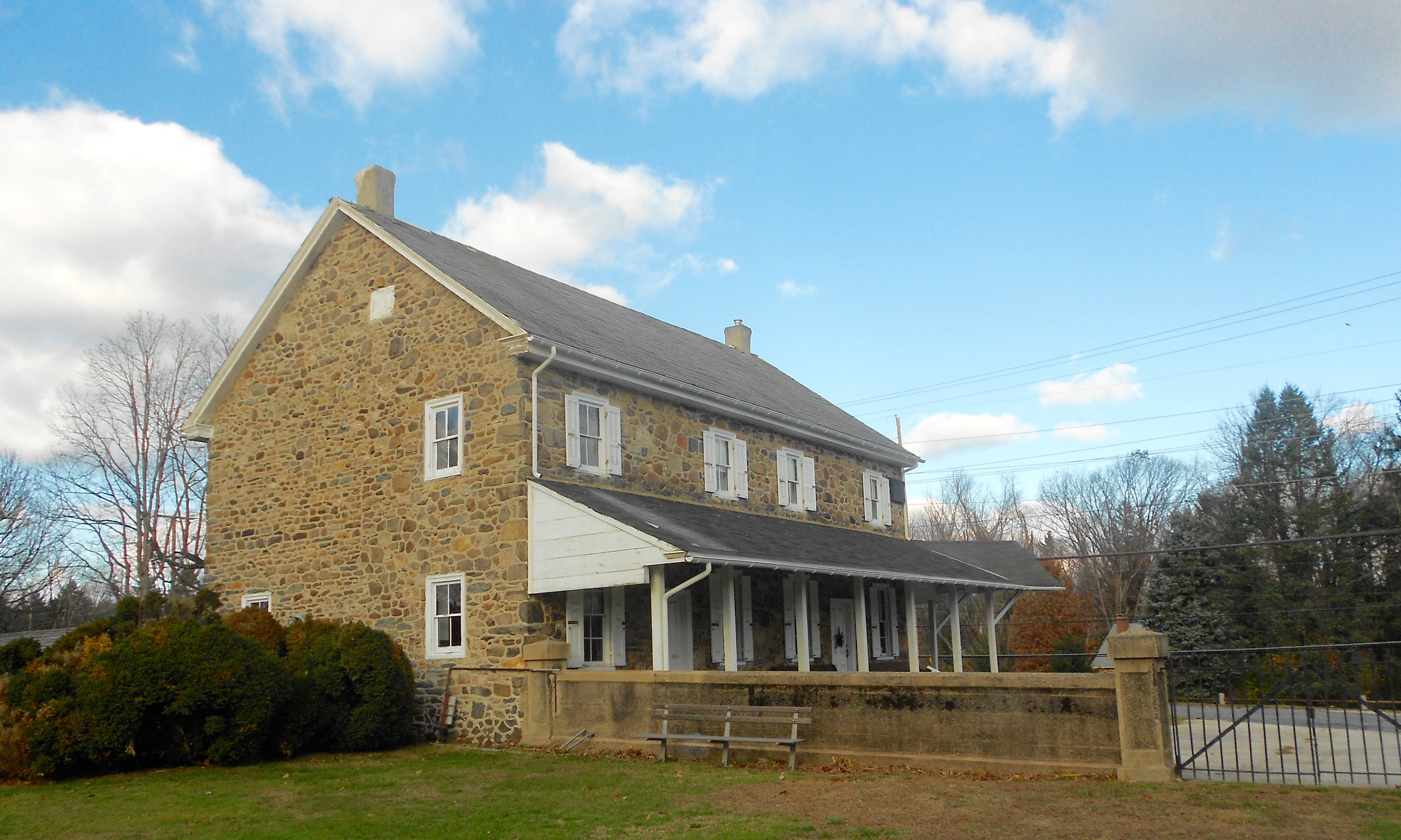
View from the southwest in 2015

The Newtown Square Friends Meeting House is a historic Quaker meetinghouse in Newtown Square, Pennsylvania, United States, built in 1711 and expanded in 1791 and 1891. It has housed, and continues to house, Quaker meetings for worship for over 300 years.

== History ==
William Penn planned two inland "New Towns" outside of his city of Philadelphia while working with Thomas Holme on the map of his province of Penn's sylvania. The town now known as Newtown Square was the "New Town" planned for Chester County, Pennsylvania, (the eastern portion of which was subsequently split off into a new Delaware County in 1789) with another "New Town" planned for Bucks County. Lots were sold to Welsh Quakers, who began arriving after 1681. These Welsh Quakers met for worship in local homes, before constructing a stone meeting house in 1711. This stone meeting house is still the meeting for worship for the Newtown Square Friends Meeting House, over 300 years later. The Meeting House is the oldest place of worship in Newtown Township, Delaware County, Pennsylvania, Pennsylvania. The Meeting House was greatly expanded and "modernized" in 1791. The architectural ghost of the original 1711 doorway and one of the original windows can be seen in the stone infill in the north wall of the expanded Meeting House. On the 100th anniversary of the first expansion, in 1891, the Meeting House was again "modernized" - with pine wainscoting, electricity, and a dividing wall that opens for worship and closes to divide the men's business meeting from the women's business meeting.

The Quakers provided for the schooling of their children by subscription, prior to the passage of the laws requiring public schools in the 1830s. The property contained an early school in the 18th century, and then a stone octagonal school, one of four octagon schools built in the township, was built in 1815. In 1885, a three-story structure was built to serve as a boarding school at the property, with the girls on the second floor and the boys on the third floor. The boarding school remained open until 1912. The building remains in place, and has served various purposes since that time.

An adjoining cemetery has been in use since about 1700. A stone wall was built around the cemetery in 1914 through the generosity of William Hood Dunwoody, who attended meeting here as a boy, and later helped found the company that became General Mills.

By 1984 the membership of the meeting was reduced to 14 members, and the meeting began the process of being "laid down" or discontinued. Nevertheless, with the help of the Haverford Quarterly Meeting, the meeting continued operation. The Meeting House celebrated its 300th anniversary in 2011. It remains in use for worship on "First Day", Sundays, at 10:00 a.m.

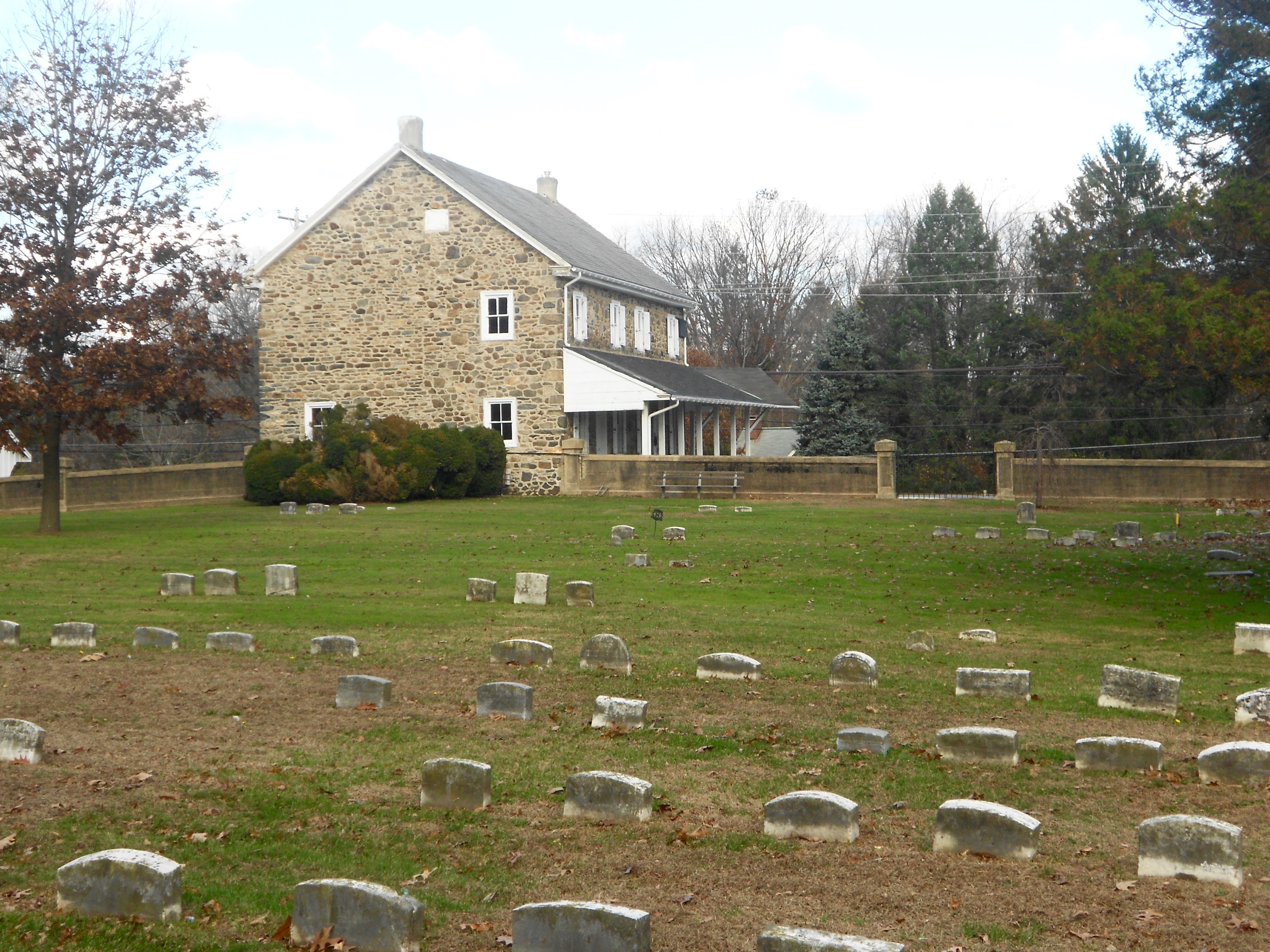
Burial ground

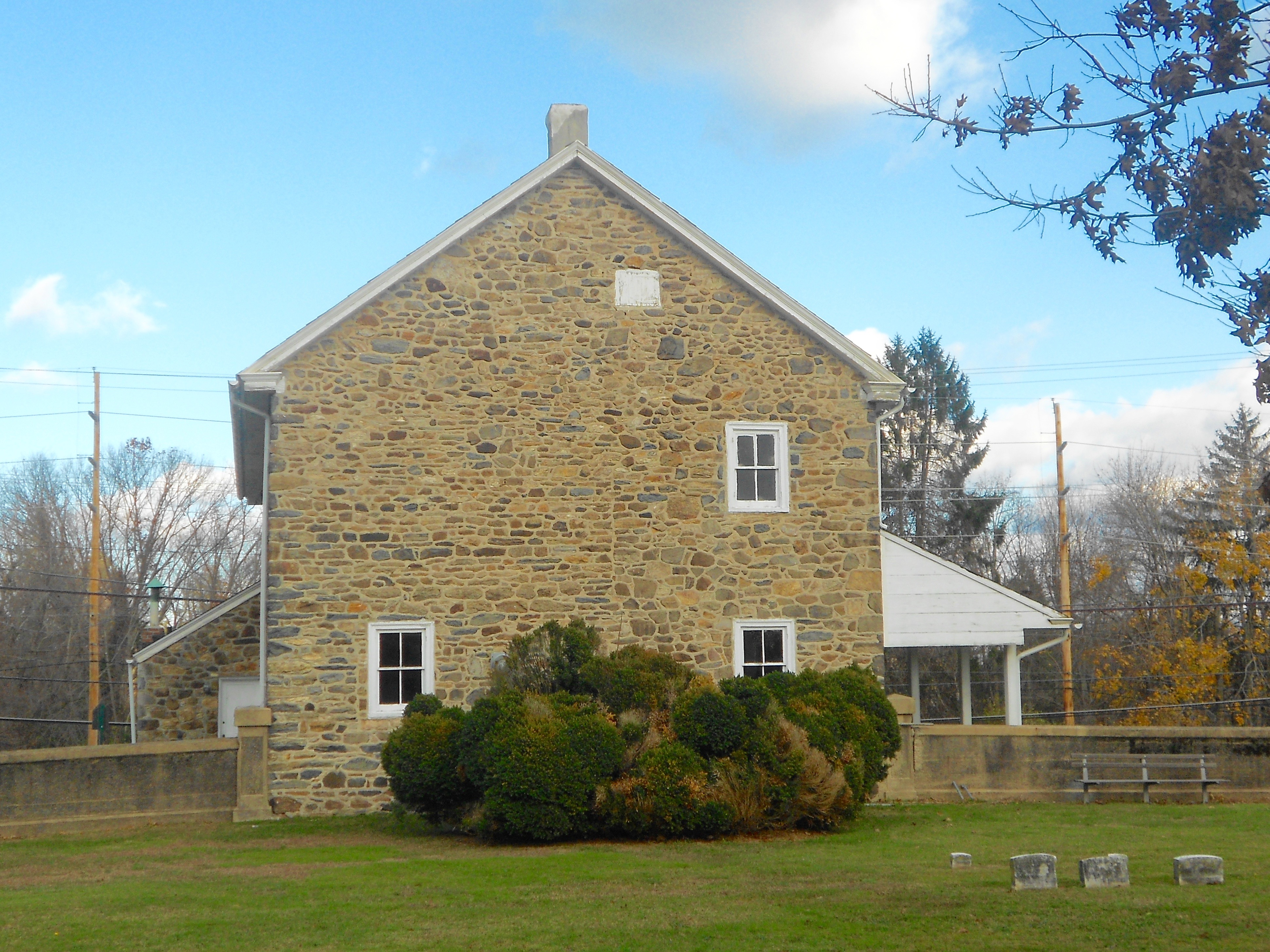
Viewed from the west

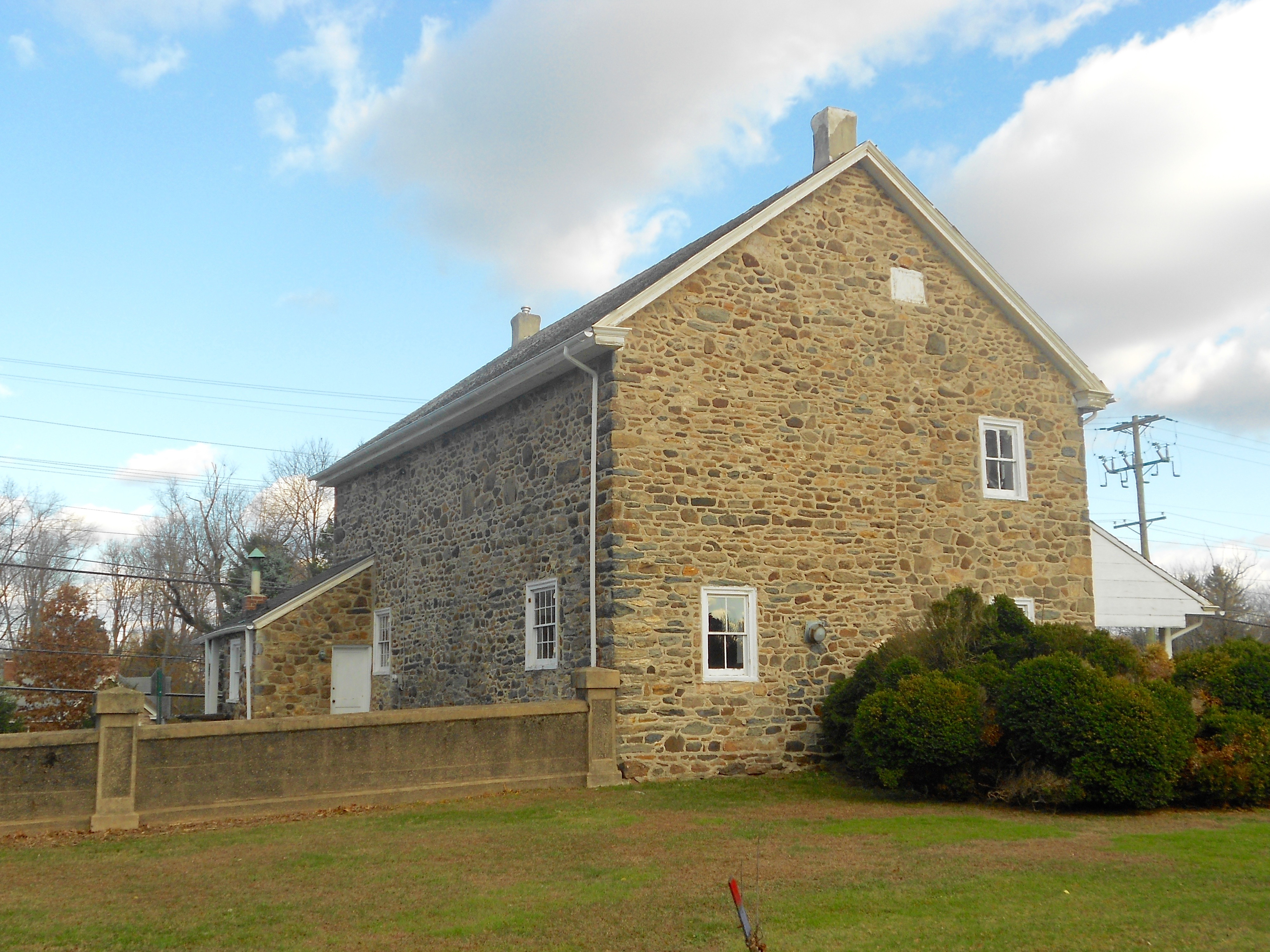
Viewed from the northwest

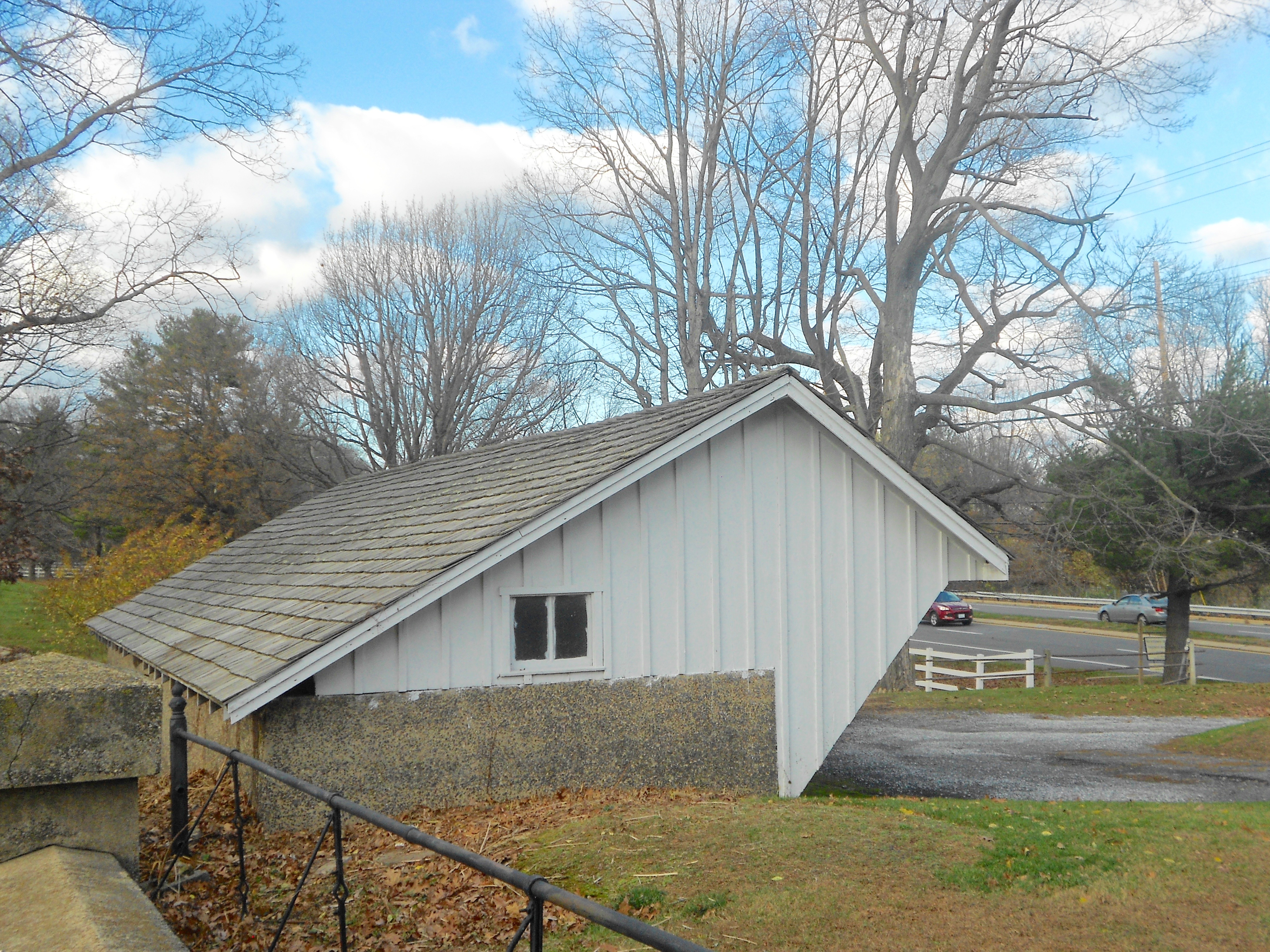
Horse shed

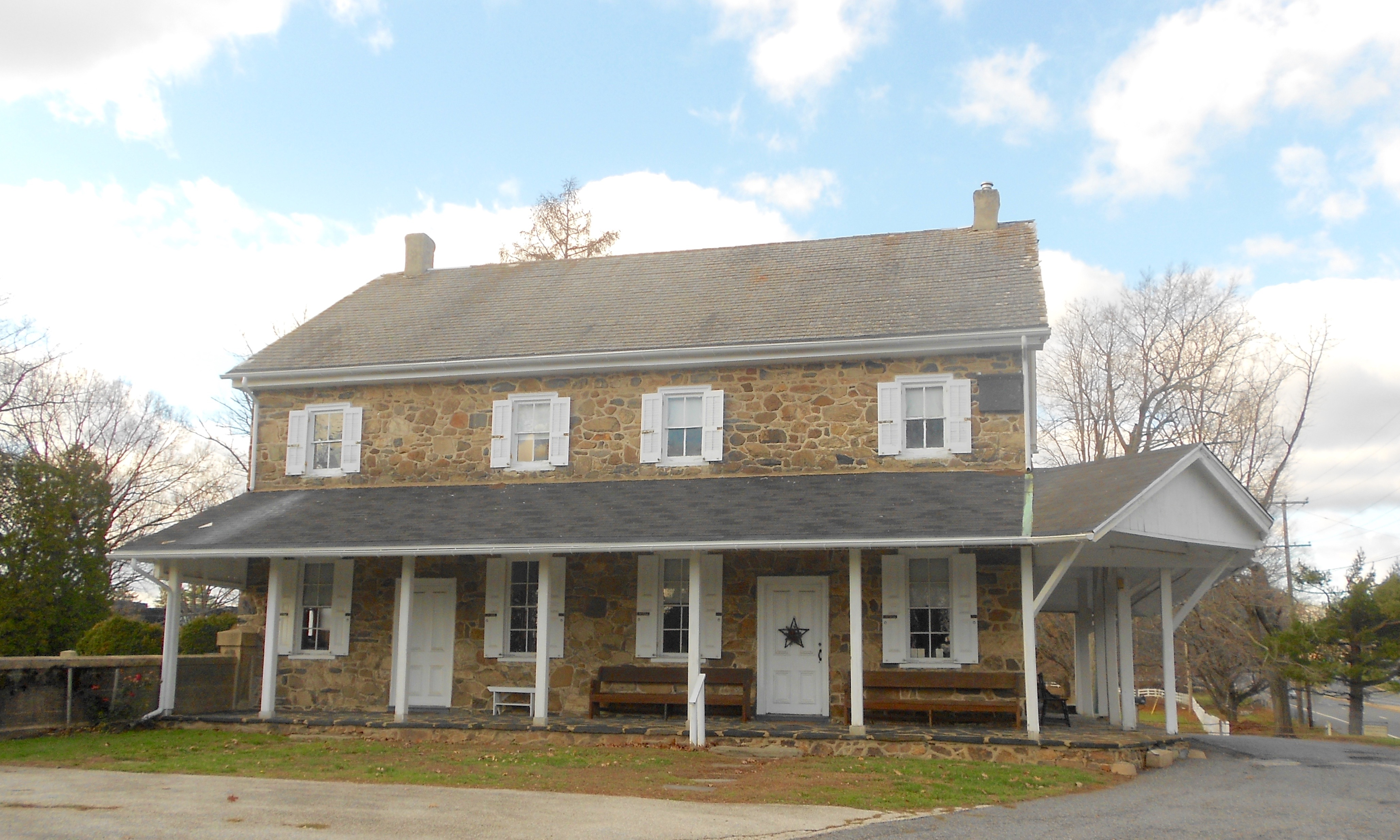
Viewed from the south
