= Willistown Township, Pennsylvania =

Township in Pennsylvania, US

Willistown Township
- Township
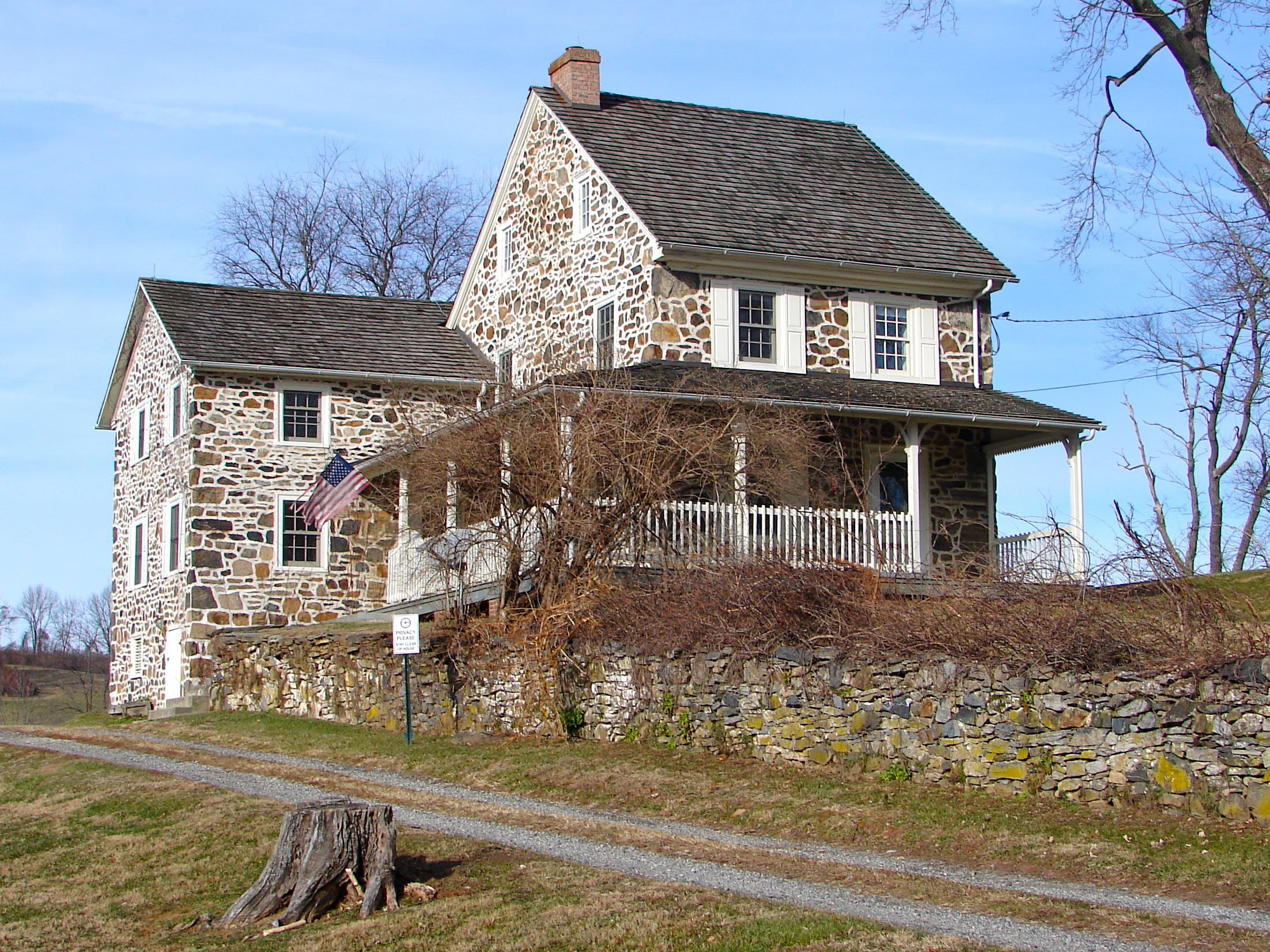
- Okehocking Historic District

- Seal

- Location in Chester County and the state of Pennsylvania.

- Location of Pennsylvania in the United States
- Coordinates: 39°59′00″N 75°28′59″W
- Country: United States
- State: Pennsylvania
- County: Chester
- First Reference: 1681
- Founded: 1704

Area
  - Total: 18.27 sq mi (47.32 km^{2})
  - Land: 18.11 sq mi (46.90 km^{2})
  - Water: 0.16 sq mi (0.42 km^{2})
- Elevation: 351 ft (107 m)

Population (2010)
  - Total: 10,497
  - Estimate (2016): 10,898
  - Density: 601.8/sq mi (232.36/km^{2})
- Time zone: UTC-5 (EST)
  - Summer (DST): UTC-4 (EDT)
- Area codes: 610 and 484
- FIPS code: 42-029-85352
- Website: www.willistown.pa.us

Willistown Township is a township in Chester County, Pennsylvania, United States. The population was 10,497 at the 2010 census. At the 1860 census, the population of Willistown was 1,521, and in 1980 it was 8,269.

== History ==
Originally occupied by Lenape Native Americans, Willistown Township was part of the 50,000 acres (200 km^{2}) Welsh Tract surveyed for William Penn in 1684. The Holmes Map of 1681 is the first reference to Willistown, calling it "Willeston". In 1704, Willistown was organized as a township.

A Native American reservation was located here and is memorialized by a monument.

The first roads in Willistown Township were Native American trails. In 1710, three cowpaths were established here: Goshen, Sugartown, and Boot. Those roads are still in existence, under the same names.

The West Chester Railroad, later to be a part of the Pennsylvania Railroad, had its eastern terminus at Malvern, in this township. The terminus was moved to Frazer in 1870.

Bartram's Covered Bridge, Garrett Farmstead, Okehocking Historic District, Sugartown Historic District, and White Horse Historic District are listed on the National Register of Historic Places.

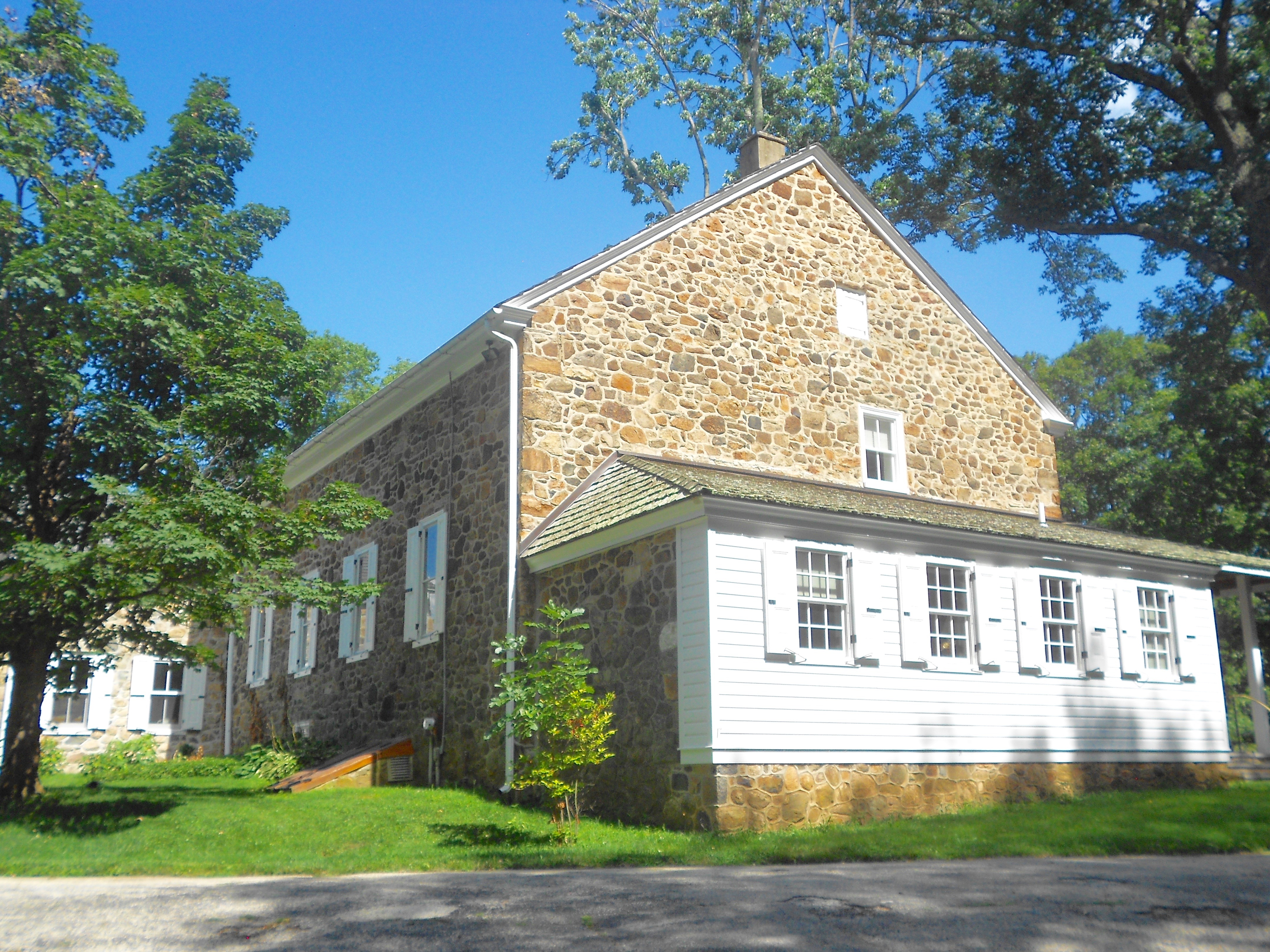
Willistown Friends Meeting House. Meeting founded in 1753. This building constructed in 1798

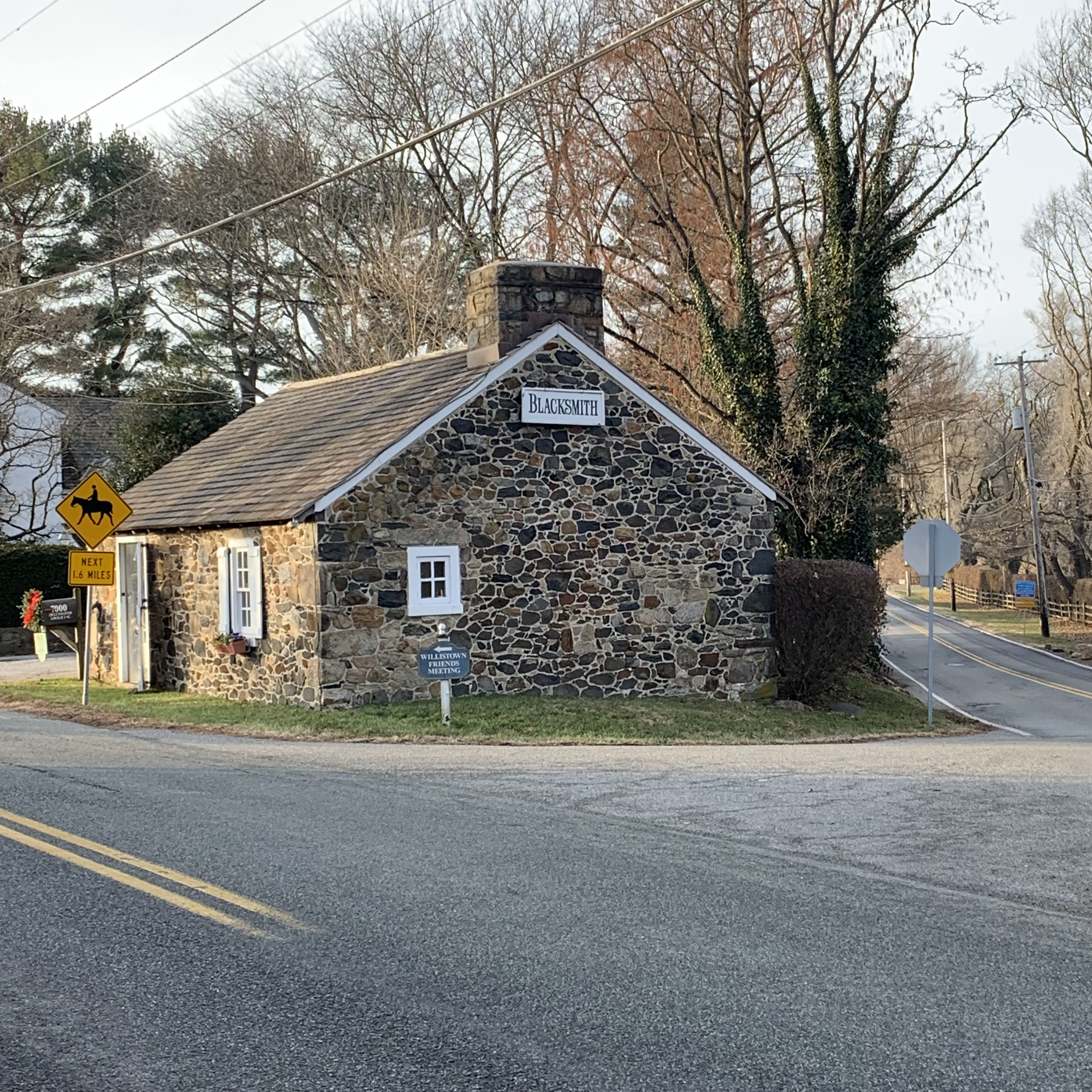
Building at the junction of Goshen and Providence Roads designed by architects, Richard Brognard (father) and Charles (son) Okie.

== Geography ==
According to the U.S. Census Bureau, the township has a total area of 18.2 square miles (47 km^{2}), all land.

Willistown Township borders Easttown Township, Newtown Township, Edgmont Township, Westtown Township, East Goshen Township, East Whiteland Township, Tredyffrin Township, and the borough of Malvern. Most of Willistown Township's addresses are in ZIP codes 19355 and 19073, with small areas in ZIP codes 19382, 19380, 19301, and 19312.

Willistown Township is a part of the suburban area west of Philadelphia known as the Main Line.

== Demographics ==
Historical population
| Census | Pop. | Note | %± |
|---|---|---|---|
| 1930 | 2,066 | | — |
| 1940 | 2,157 | | 4.4% |
| 1950 | 2,709 | | 25.6% |
| 1960 | 6,492 | | 139.6% |
| 1970 | 9,128 | | 40.6% |
| 1980 | 8,284 | | −9.2% |
| 1990 | 9,380 | | 13.2% |
| 2000 | 10,001 | | 6.6% |
| 2010 | 10,497 | | 5.0% |
| 2020 | 11,273 | | 7.4% |

At the 2010 census, the township was 92.0% non-Hispanic White, 2.1% Black or African American, 3.6% Asian, and 0.8% were two or more races. 1.5% of the population were of Hispanic or Latino ancestry.

As of the census of 2000, there were 10,011 people, 3,806 households, and 2,850 families residing in the township. The population density was 549.0 people per square mile (212.0 people/km^{2}). There were 3,932 housing units at an average density of 215.6 per square mile (83.2/km^{2}). The racial makeup of the township was 95.85% White, 2.14% African American, 0.05% Native American, 1.27% Asian, 0.10% Pacific Islander, 0.30% from other races, and 0.29% from two or more races. Hispanic or Latino of any race were 0.81% of the population.

There were 3,806 households, out of which 29.9% had children under the age of 18 living with them, 66.7% were married couples living together, 6.4% had a female householder with no husband present, and 25.1% were non-families. 20.9% of all households were made up of individuals, and 7.7% had someone living alone who was 65 years of age or older. The average household size was 2.55 and the average family size was 2.97.

In the township the population was spread out, with 23.4% under the age of 18, 4.4% from 18 to 24, 26.2% from 25 to 44, 30.3% from 45 to 64, and 15.7% who were 65 years of age or older. The median age was 43 years. For every 100 females, there were 93.6 males. For every 100 females age 18 and over, there were 89.7 males.

The median income for a household in the township was $77,555, and the median income for a family was $93,057. This number has risen to $121,726 as per 2009 estimates. Males had a median income of $62,398 versus $39,468 for females. The per capita income for the township was $45,010. About 1.7% of families and 4.0% of the population were below the poverty line, including 3.9% of those under age 18 and 3.8% of those age 65 or over.

== Transportation ==
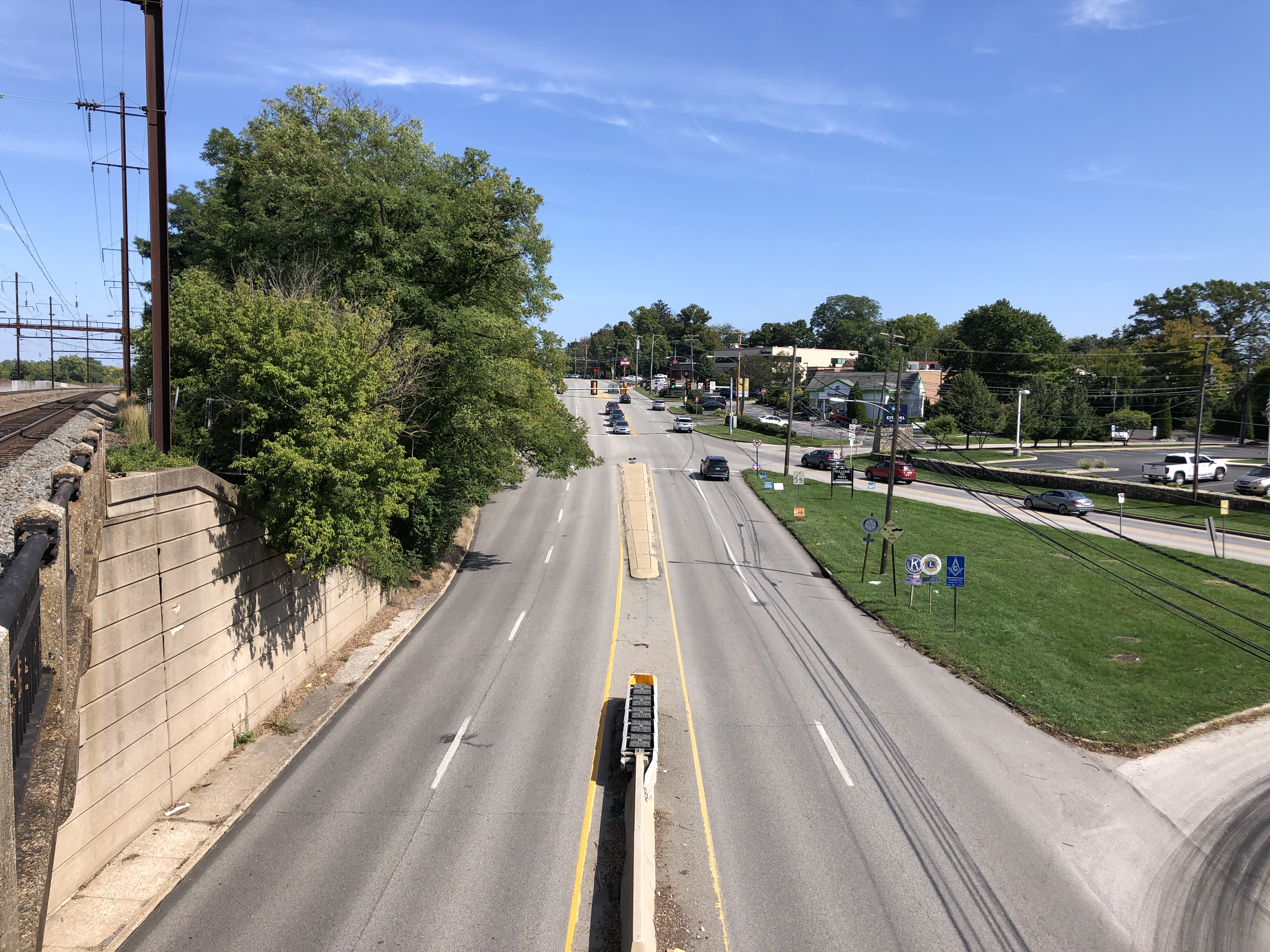
US 30 eastbound in Willistown Township

As of 2021, there were 84.26 miles (135.60 km) of public roads in Willistown Township, of which 27.46 miles (44.19 km) were maintained by the Pennsylvania Department of Transportation (PennDOT) and 56.80 miles (91.41 km) were maintained by the township.

U.S. Route 30 is the most prominent highway serving Willistown Township. It follows an east–west alignment along Lancaster Avenue across the northern corner of the township. Pennsylvania Route 3 follows West Chester Pike along an east–west alignment across the southern portion of the township. Finally, Pennsylvania Route 926 starts at PA 3 and heads southwest along Street Road in the southern corner of the township.

== Notable people ==
- William Evans (1831–1905), member of the Pennsylvania House of Representatives
- Nathaniel Grubb, member of the Pennsylvania Colonial Assembly
- M. Night Shyamalan, filmmaker
- Edward L. Stokes (1880-1964), U.S. Congressman from 1931-1935

== Education ==
The township is served by Great Valley School District.
