= White Horse Historic District =

Historic district in Pennsylvania, United States

- U.S. National Register of Historic Places
- U.S. Historic district
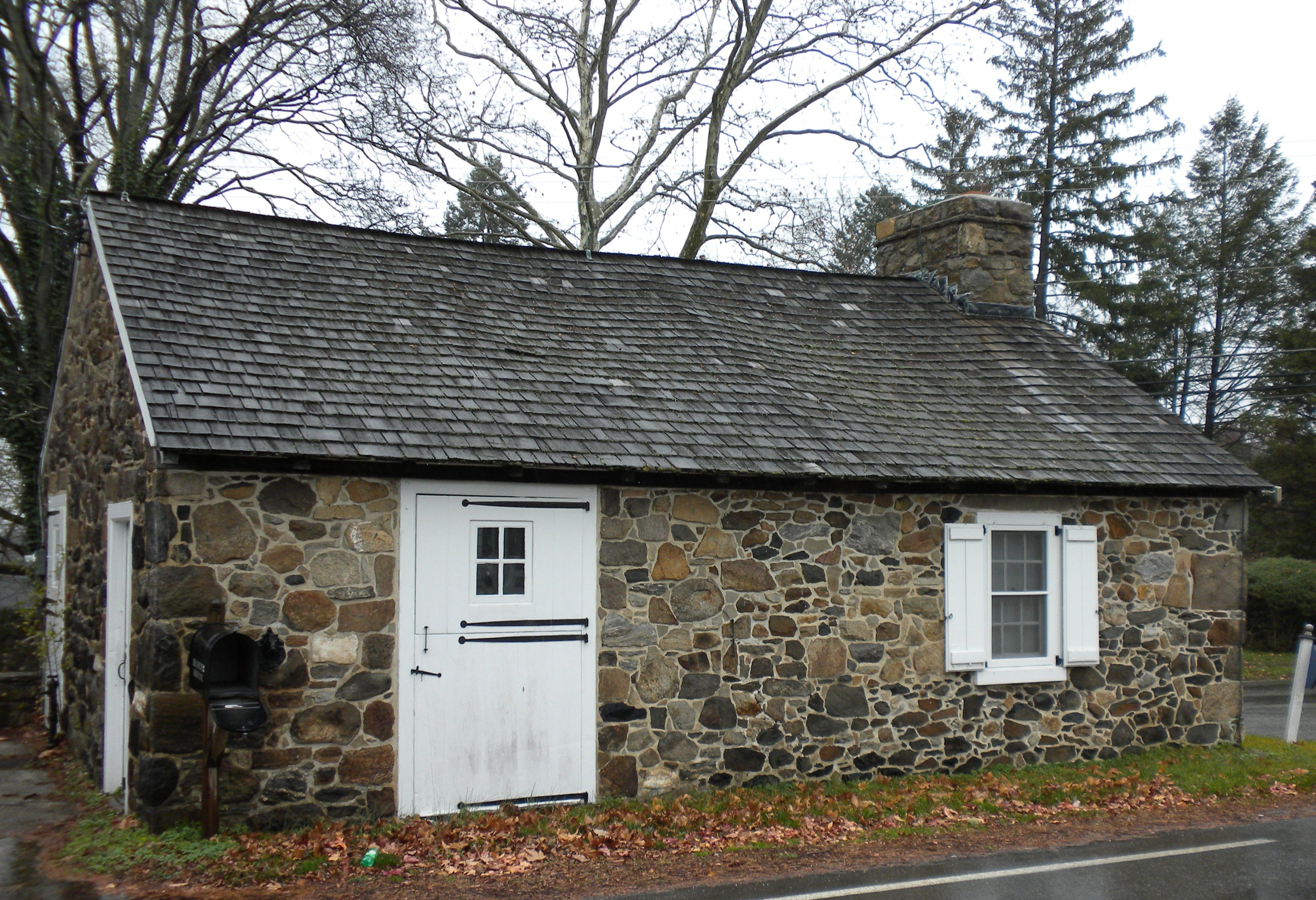
- White Horse Historic District, November 2009

- Location within Pennsylvania Location within the United States
- Location: Jct. of Goshen and Providence Rds., Willistown Township, Pennsylvania
- Coordinates: 39°59′26″N 75°28′09″W
- Area: 35 acres (14 ha)
- Built: 1798
- Architect: Okie, R. Brognard; Okie, Charles
- Architectural style: Federal, Greek Revival, et al.
- NRHP reference No.: 01000058
- Added to NRHP: February 2, 2001

The White Horse Historic District, also known as White Horse Village, is a national historic district that is located in Willistown Township, Chester County, Pennsylvania.

It was listed on the National Register of Historic Places in 2001.

== History and architectural features ==
This district encompasses fifteen contributing buildings and one contributing structure that are located in the crossroads village of White Horse. Built between 1798 and 1950, approximately, they are primarily two-and-one-half or three-story masonry structures that are clad in stucco. Seven of the contributing buildings are residences.

The other contributing buildings include the former blacksmith shop (c. 1812/1848), where Thomas J. Thornton from Dundalk Ireland was the resident blacksmith from 1948 until his death while shoeing a horse at a nearby Radnor Hunt on April 13, 1968, the White Horse Store and residence (1798), and the White Horse Tavern (c. 1798). A number of the houses were renovated during the 1930s and 1940s by architect R. Brognard Okie (1875-1945).
