= Bartram's Covered Bridge =

- U.S. National Register of Historic Places
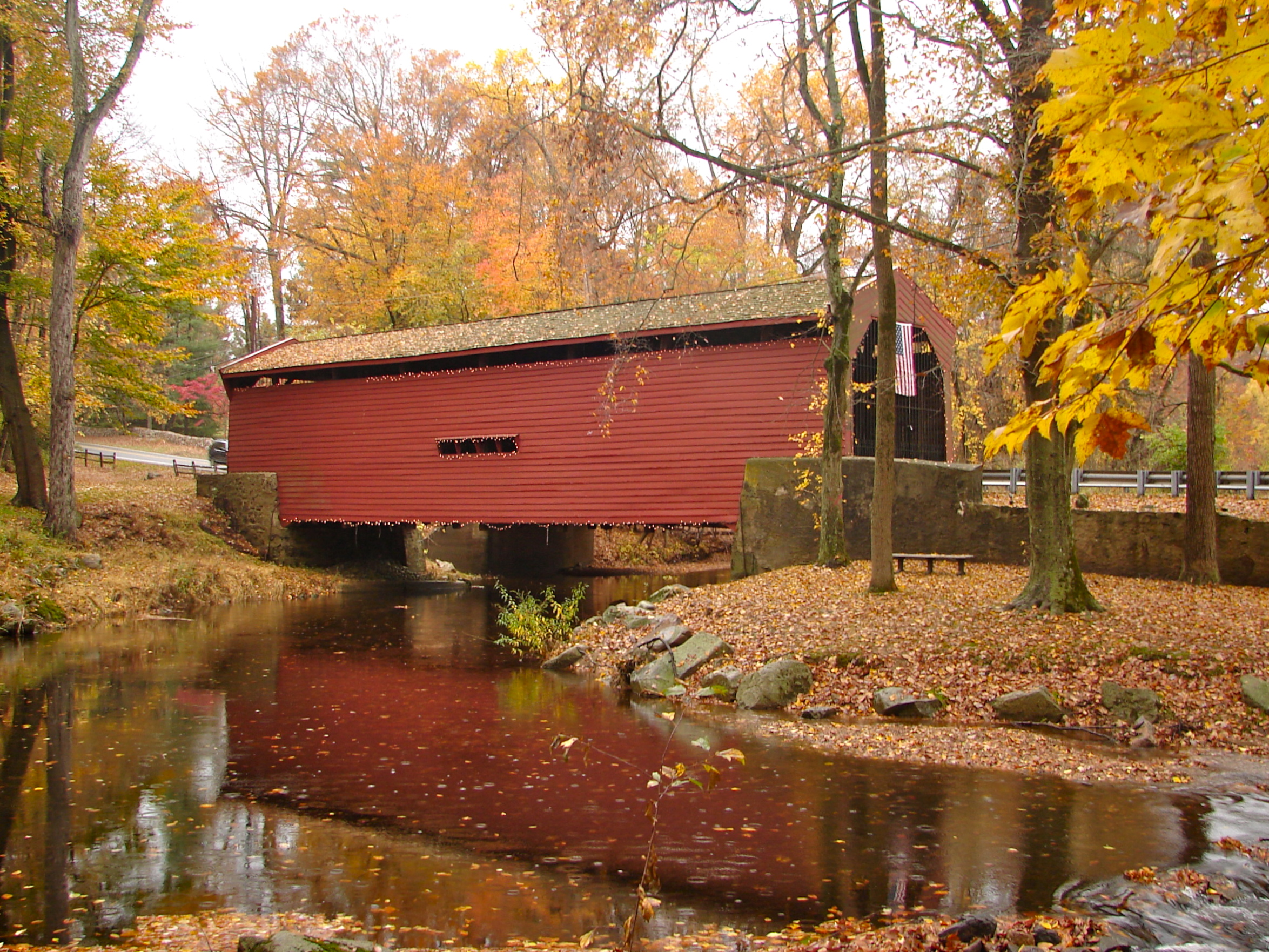
- Bartram's Covered Bridge

- Location within Pennsylvania Location within the United States
- Location: Legislative Route 15098, west of Newtown, Pennsylvania
- Coordinates: 39°59′23″N 75°26′15″W
- Area: less than one acre
- Built: 1860
- Built by: Ferdinand Wood
- Architectural style: Burr truss
- MPS: Covered Bridges of Chester County TR
- NRHP reference No.: 80003462
- Added to NRHP: December 10, 1980

Bartram's Covered Bridge, a historic covered bridge built in 1860, uses a Burr Truss design and carried Goshen Road over Crum Creek on the border between Delaware County and Chester County, Pennsylvania. It is 30 feet (9.1 m) long and 13 feet (4.0 m) wide and is the only covered bridge remaining of the 30 which once stood in Delaware County. The bridge has slanted planks at each entrance and is the only covered bridge in Pennsylvania with this feature. According to an on-site marker from the Newtown Square Historical Preservation Society, the bridge was built to be "hi and wide as a load of hay" It was built by Ferdinand Wood and named for Mordecai Bartram.

It was closed to traffic in 1941 and stands next to a new bridge on Goshen Road. The east end of the bridge is located in Newtown Township, Delaware County and the west end in Willistown Township, Chester County.

It was listed on the National Register of Historic Places in 1980.

== Gallery ==
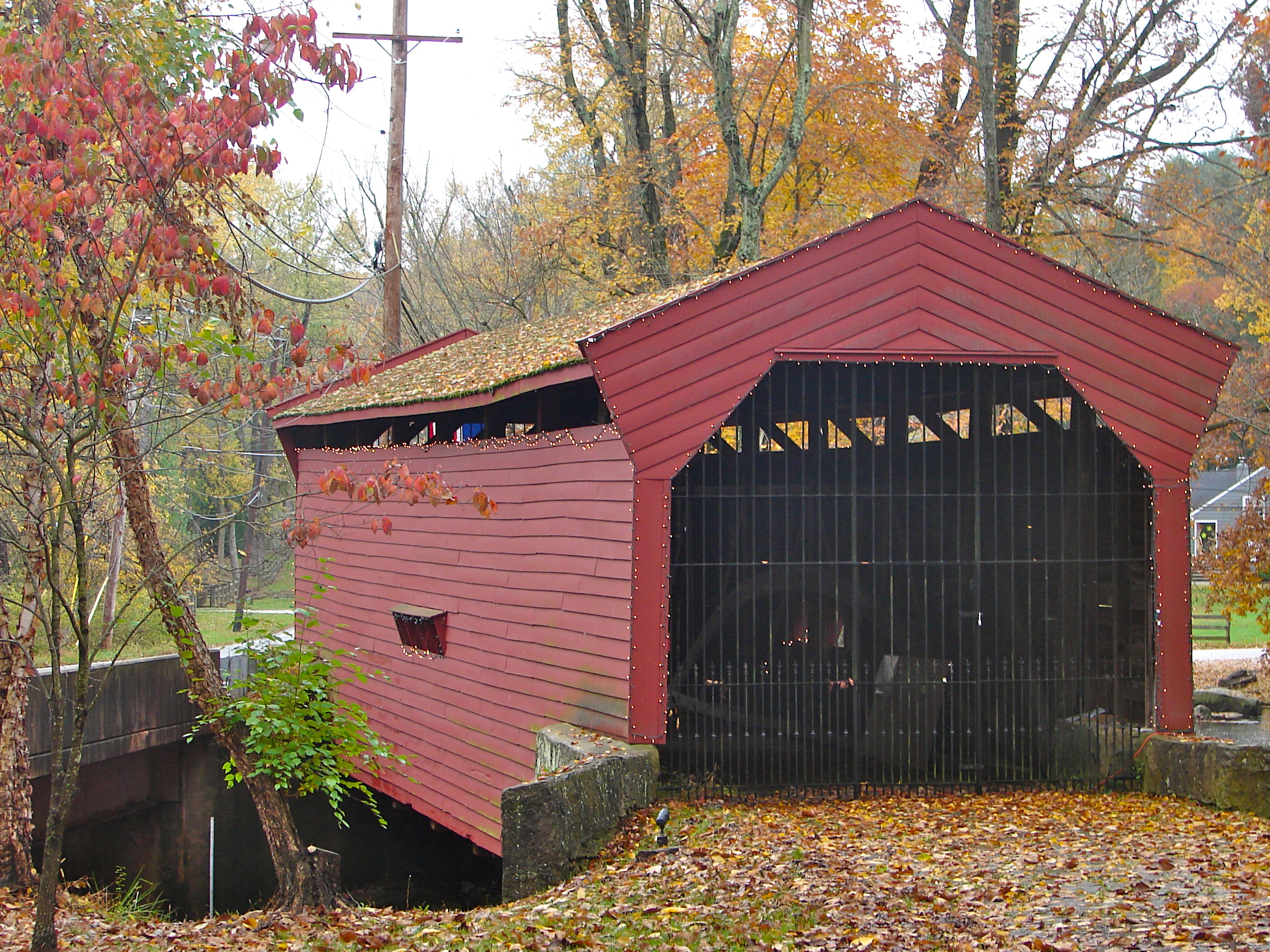
Slanted planks on the western entrance

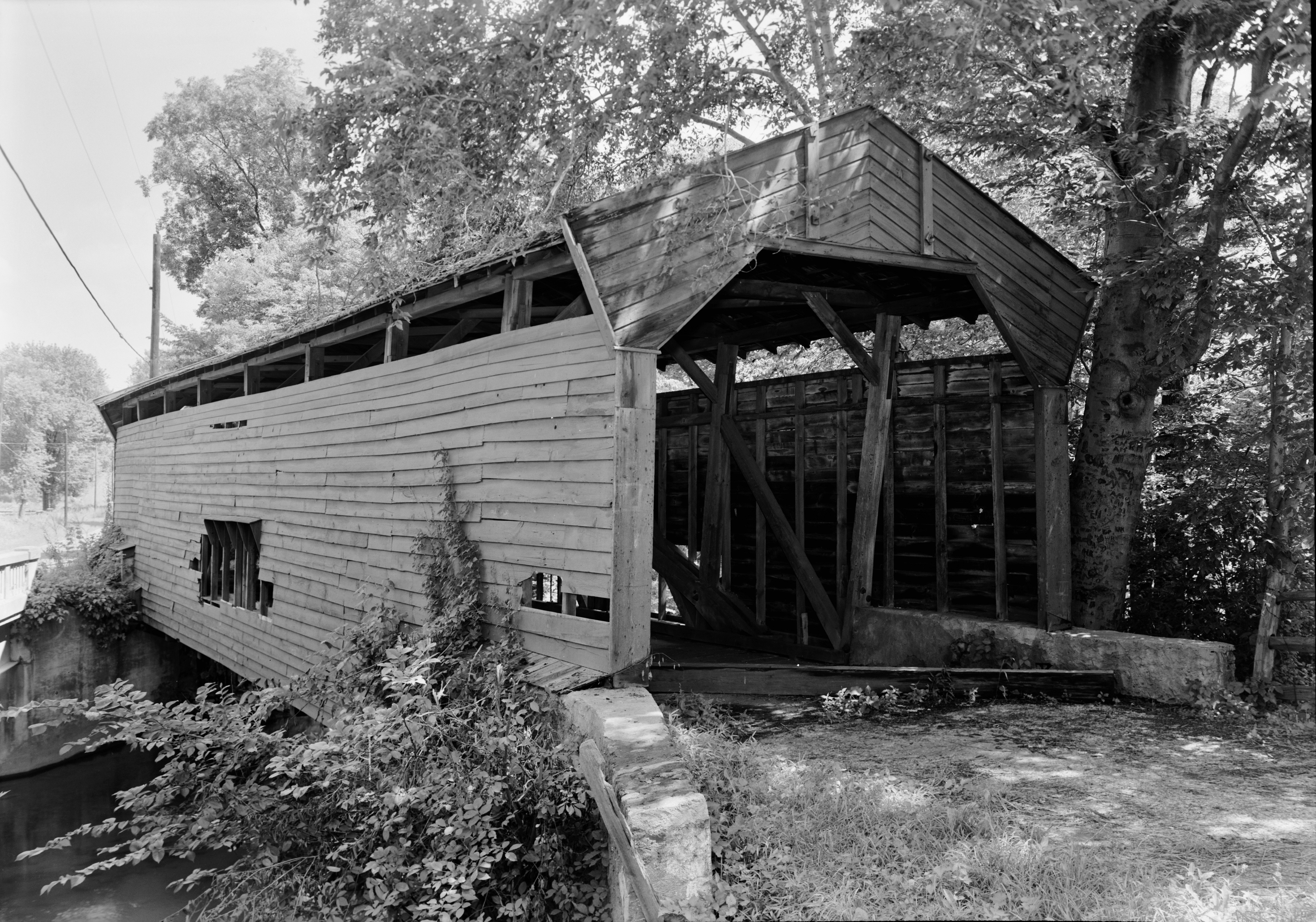
HABS photo c. 1965

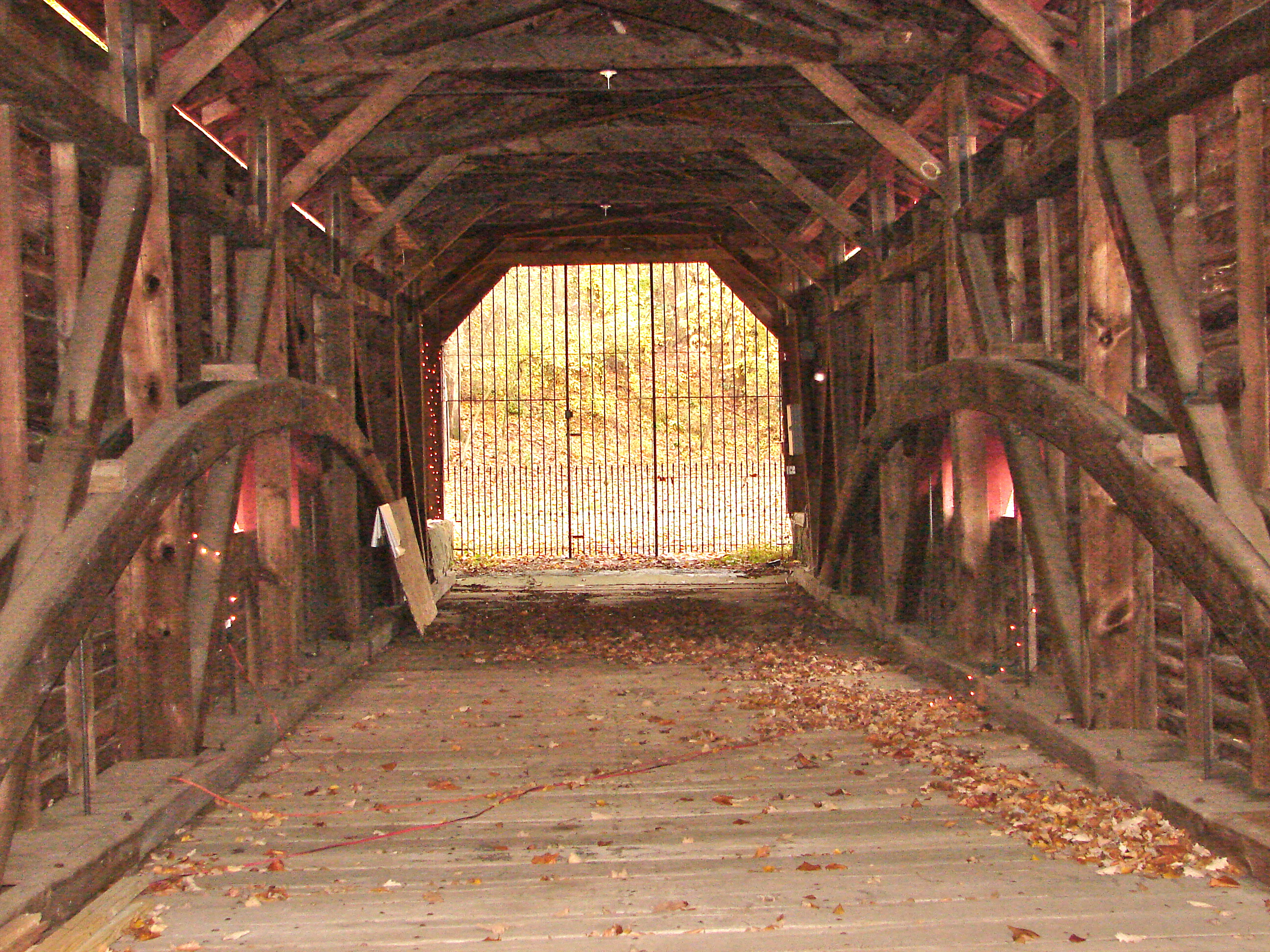
Interior, looking west, showing the Burr truss design

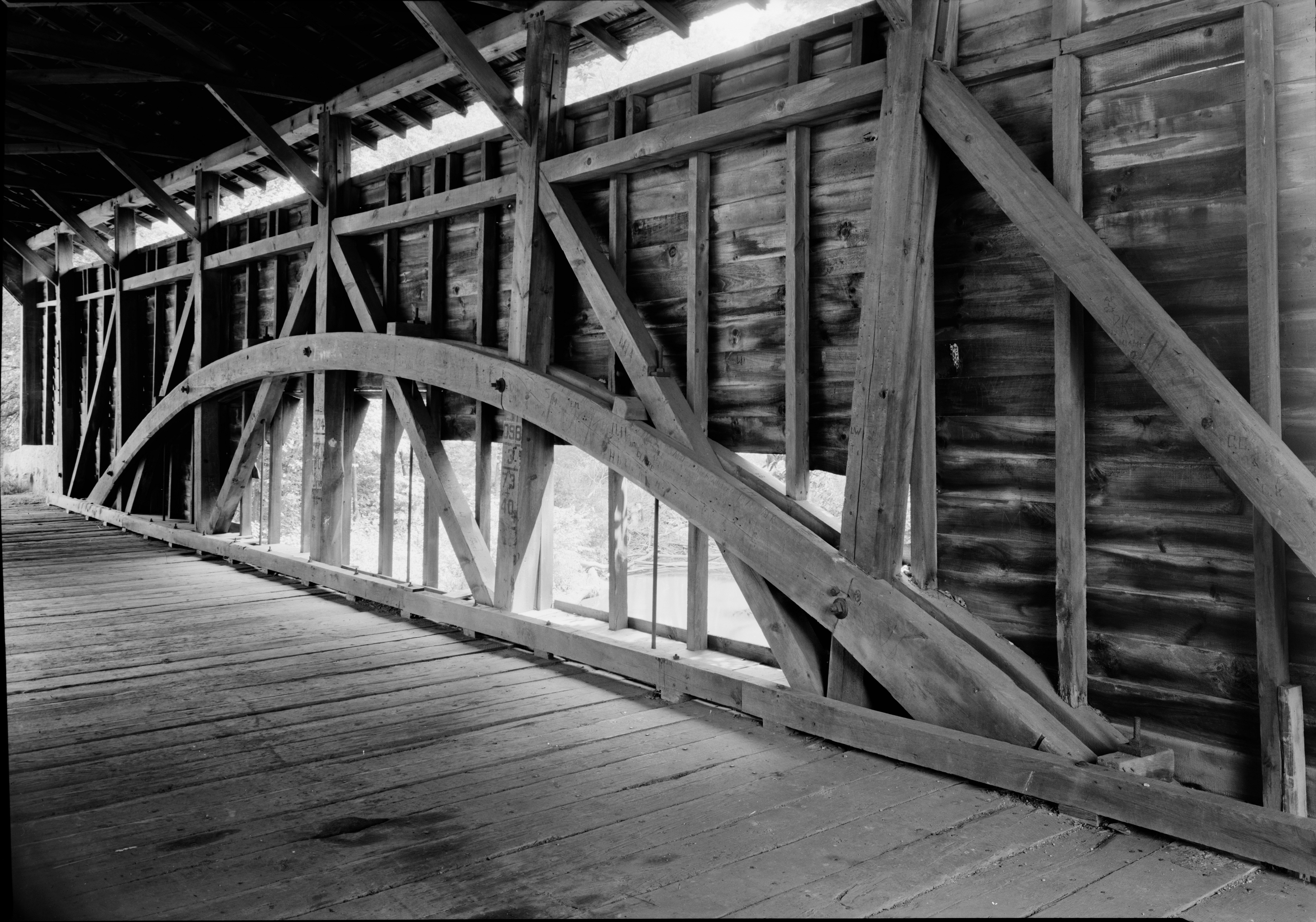
HABS photo c. 1965

== See also ==
- List of covered bridges on the National Register of Historic Places in Pennsylvania

== Sources ==
- Driscoll, Christopher P.; Conn, George D.; Humes, Doug P.; Gerst, Eric D. (2011). Bartram Covered Bridge: Spanning History. eBookIt.com and The Newtown Square Historical Preservation Society. p. 118.
