= Sugartown, Pennsylvania =

Unincorporated settlement in Pennsylvania, U.S.

- Sugartown Historic District
- U.S. National Register of Historic Places
- U.S. Historic district
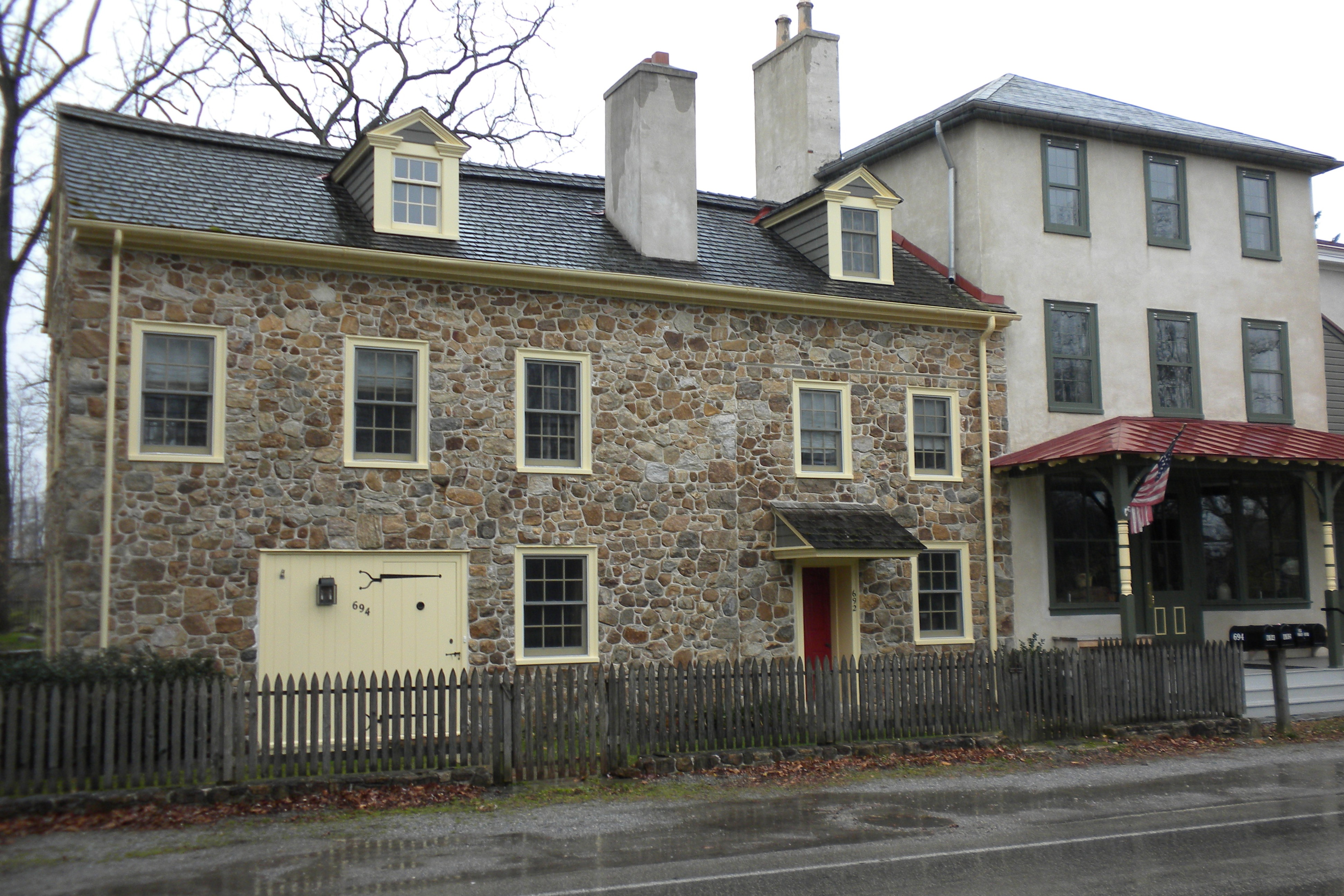
- Saddler's Shop and the General Store

- Location within Pennsylvania Location within the United States
- Location: Sugartown, Boot, Spring, Dutton Mill, and Providence Roads, near Malvern, Willistown Township, Pennsylvania
- Coordinates: 39°59′57″N 75°30′30″W
- Area: 39 acres (16 ha)
- NRHP reference No.: 84003230
- Added to NRHP: September 07, 1984

Sugartown is an unincorporated settlement that is located in central Willistown Township, Chester County, Pennsylvania, United States, at the intersection of Sugartown and Boot Roads. It is situated eighteen miles west of Philadelphia.

== History ==
The town was named after Eli Shugart, a 19th-century tavern keeper. Sugartown is a typical crossroads village that provides goods and services to the surrounding farm community. It played an important part in the development of Willistown and contains an inn, general store, blacksmith and wheelwright, cabinetmaker, saddler, shoemaker and a doctor.

The Sugartown Historic District is a national historic district that encompasses fourteen contributing buildings. It includes the Sign of the Spread Eagle tavern (c. 1790), the Sugartown Store (c. 1800) and residence (1860), the Willistown Township Building (1909), "Coxefield" (c. 1790), a shoemaker's shop (c. 1790), the Sugartown School (1866), the Friends school (1782–1783, 1862), and a schoolmaster's house (1785).
