= Square Tavern =

- U.S. National Register of Historic Places
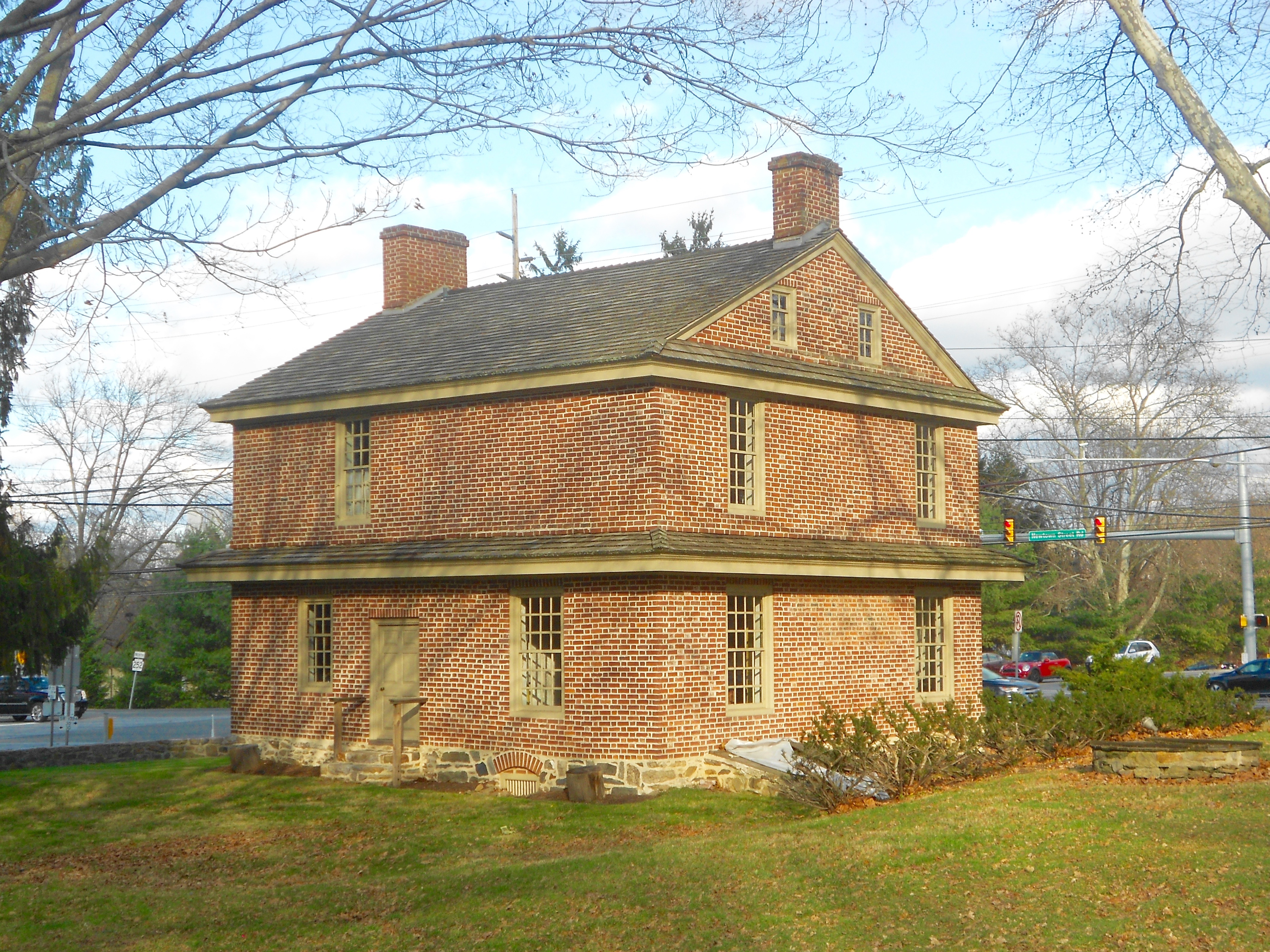
- Square Tavern, November 2015

- Location within Pennsylvania Location within the United States
- Location: Newtown Street Rd. and Goshen Rd., Newtown Township, Pennsylvania, U.S.
- Coordinates: 39°59′46″N 75°24′30″W
- Area: 3 acres (1.2 ha)
- Built: 1742
- Built by: Elliot, Francis
- NRHP reference No.: 84003353
- Added to NRHP: September 7, 1984

The Square Tavern, also known as the John West House, The Square, and the Newtown Square Tavern, is an historic tavern that is located Newtown Township, Pennsylvania, United States. It was the boyhood home of painter Benjamin West, known for his work depicting events of 18th century American history.

It was added to the National Register of Historic Places in 1984.

== History and architectural features ==
The original section of this historic structure was completed in 1742 and is a two-and-one-half-story, rectangular, gable-roofed, brick building that measures thirty-two feet wide and twenty-eight feet deep. A small two-story kitchen addition was built sometime before 1798, and was later replaced with a two-story wing. That wing was removed during a 1981 restoration, which returned the building to its 1742 appearance.

The building serves as a museum and home to the Delaware County Tourist Bureau.

== Gallery ==
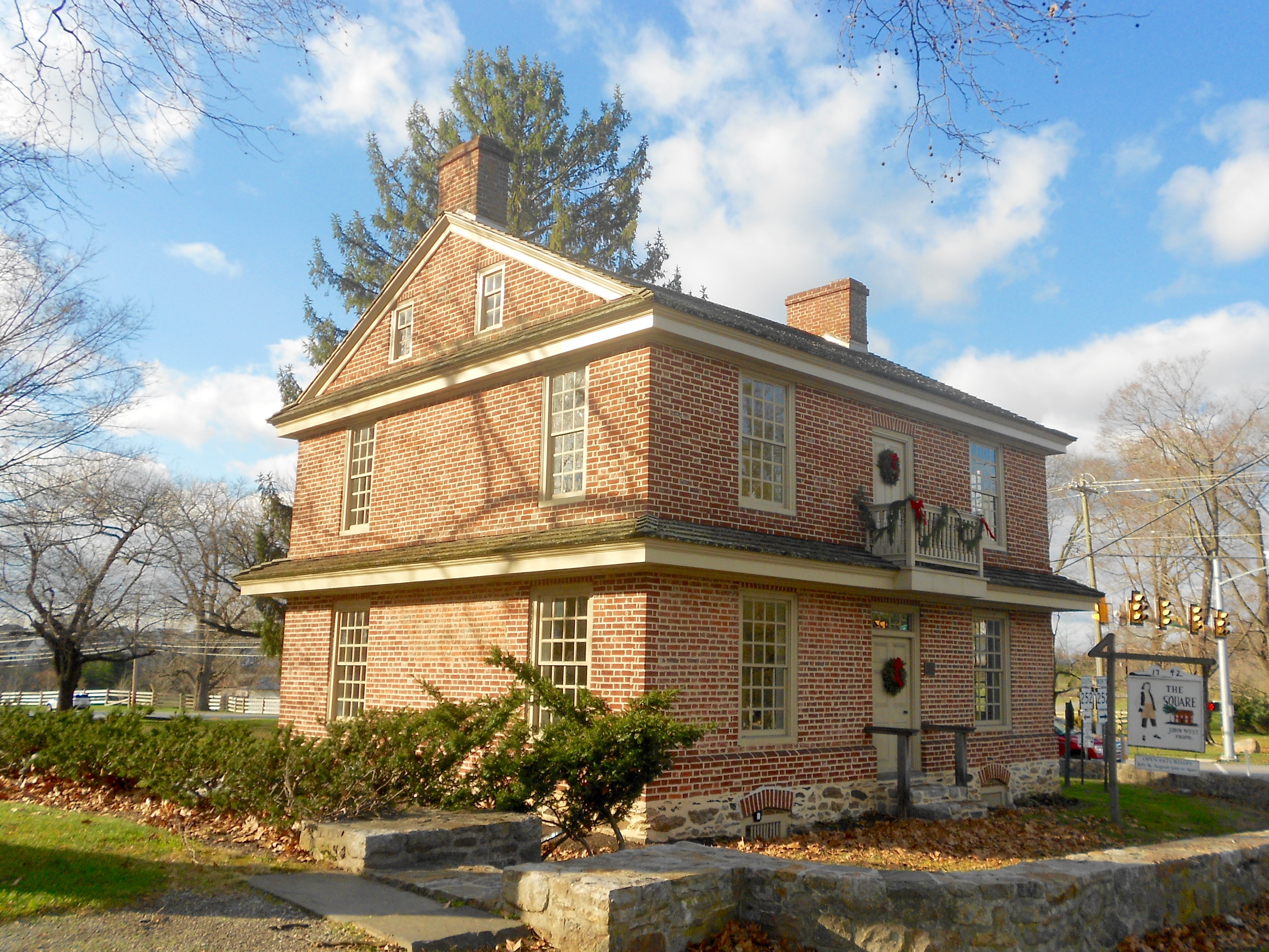
View from the southeast

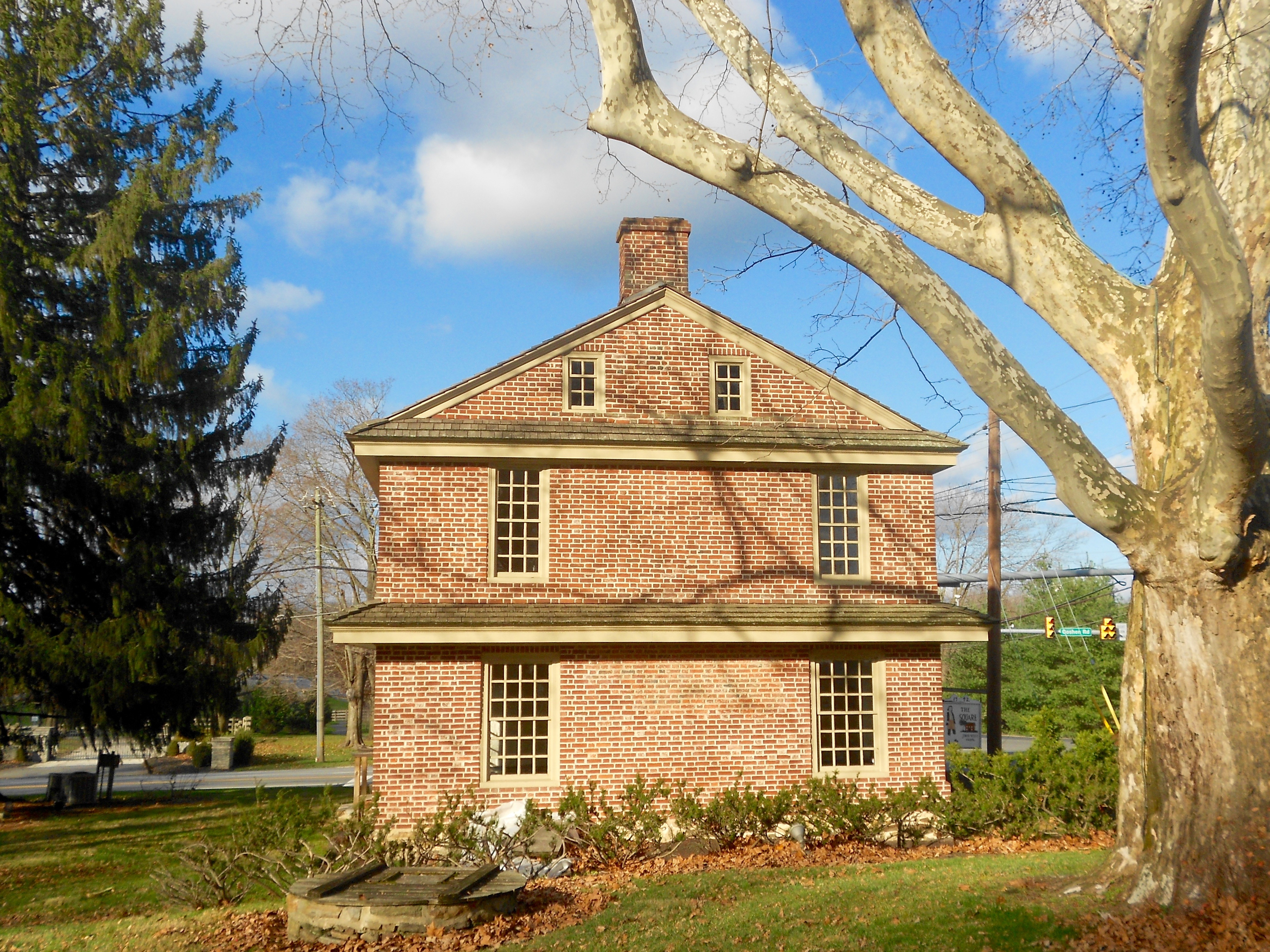
View from the south

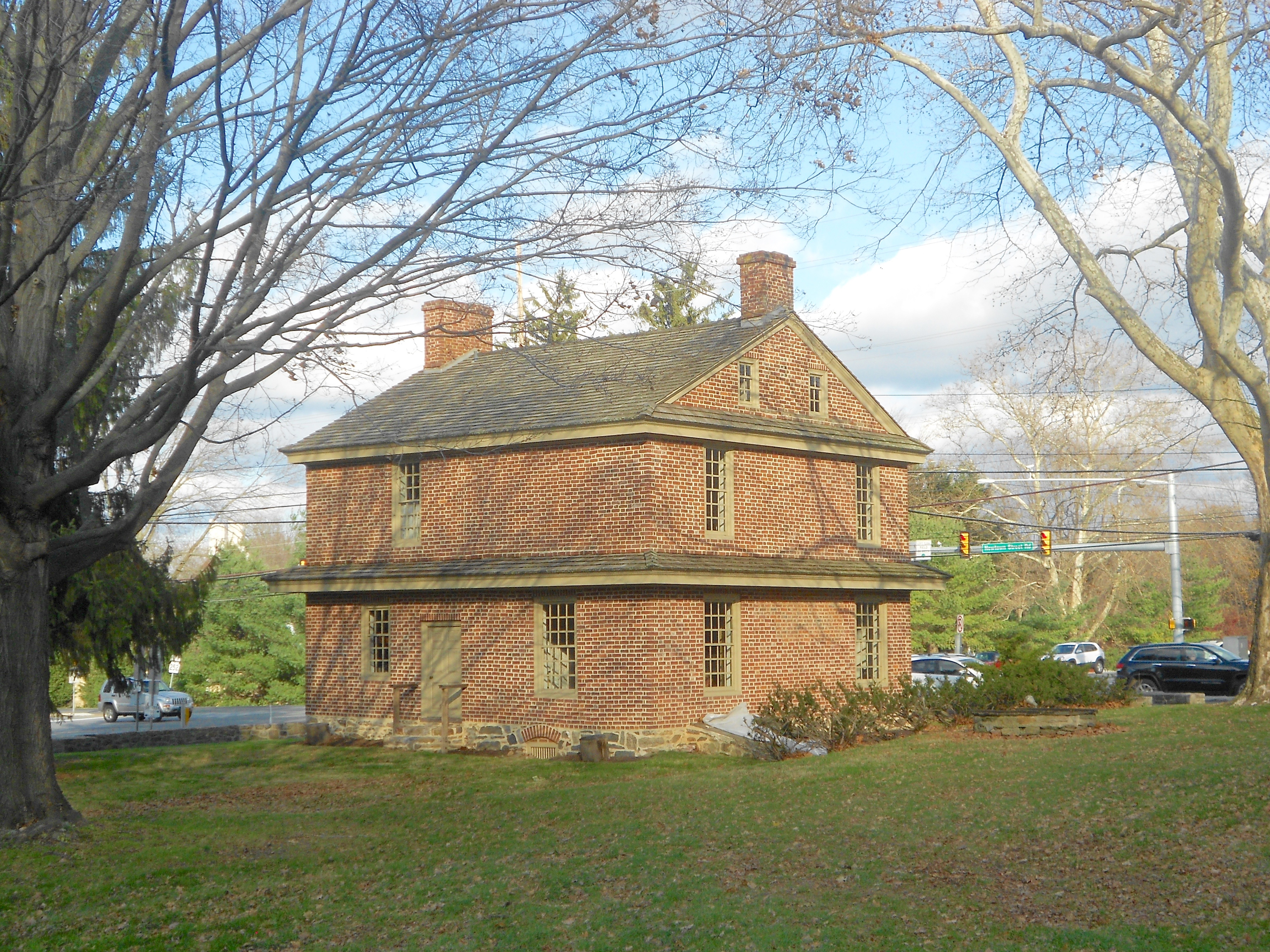
View from the southwest

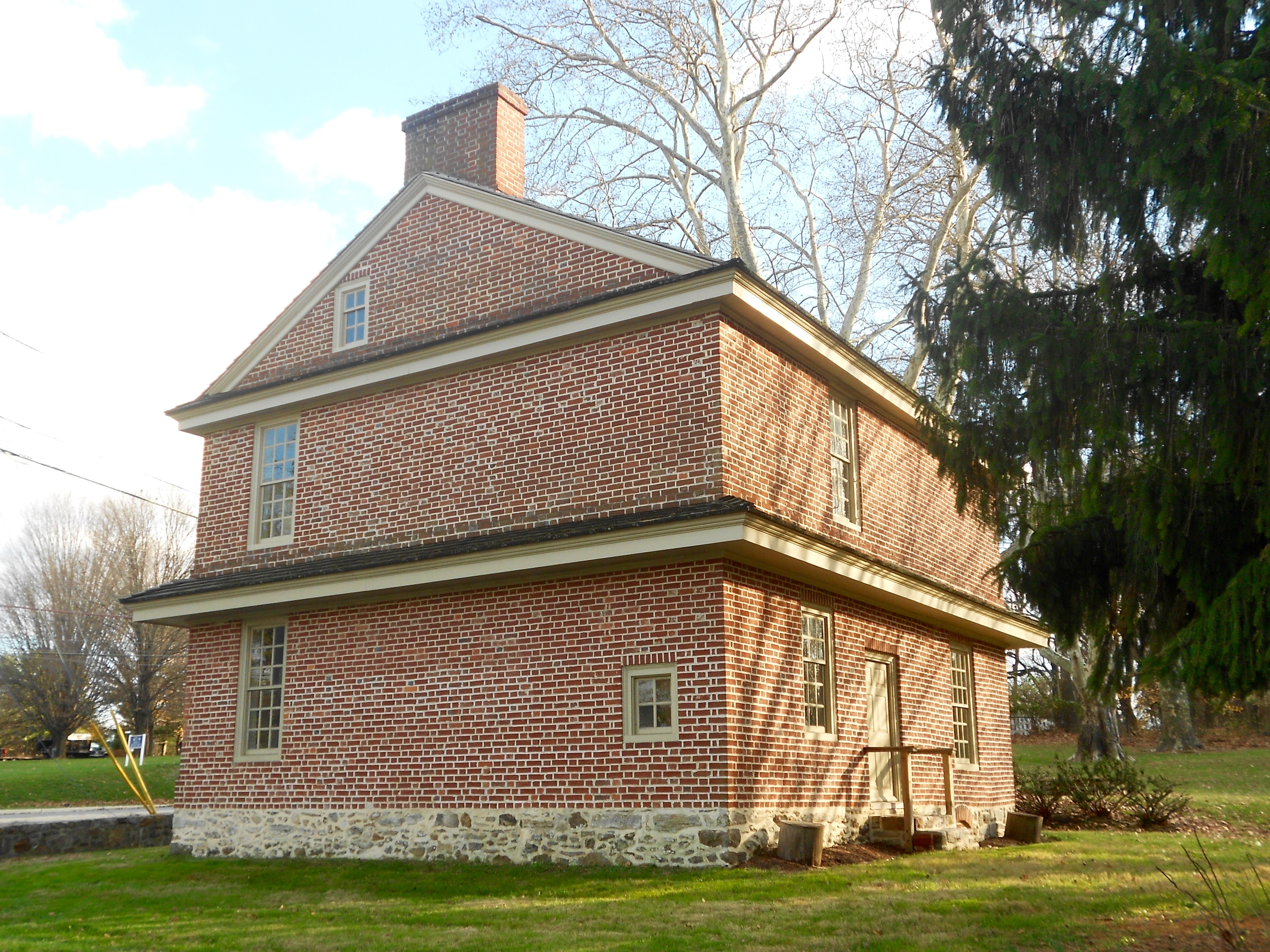
View from the northwest
