= Crosley–Garrett Mill Workers' Housing, Store, and Mill Site =

Historic buildings in Pennsylvania, United States

- U.S. National Register of Historic Places
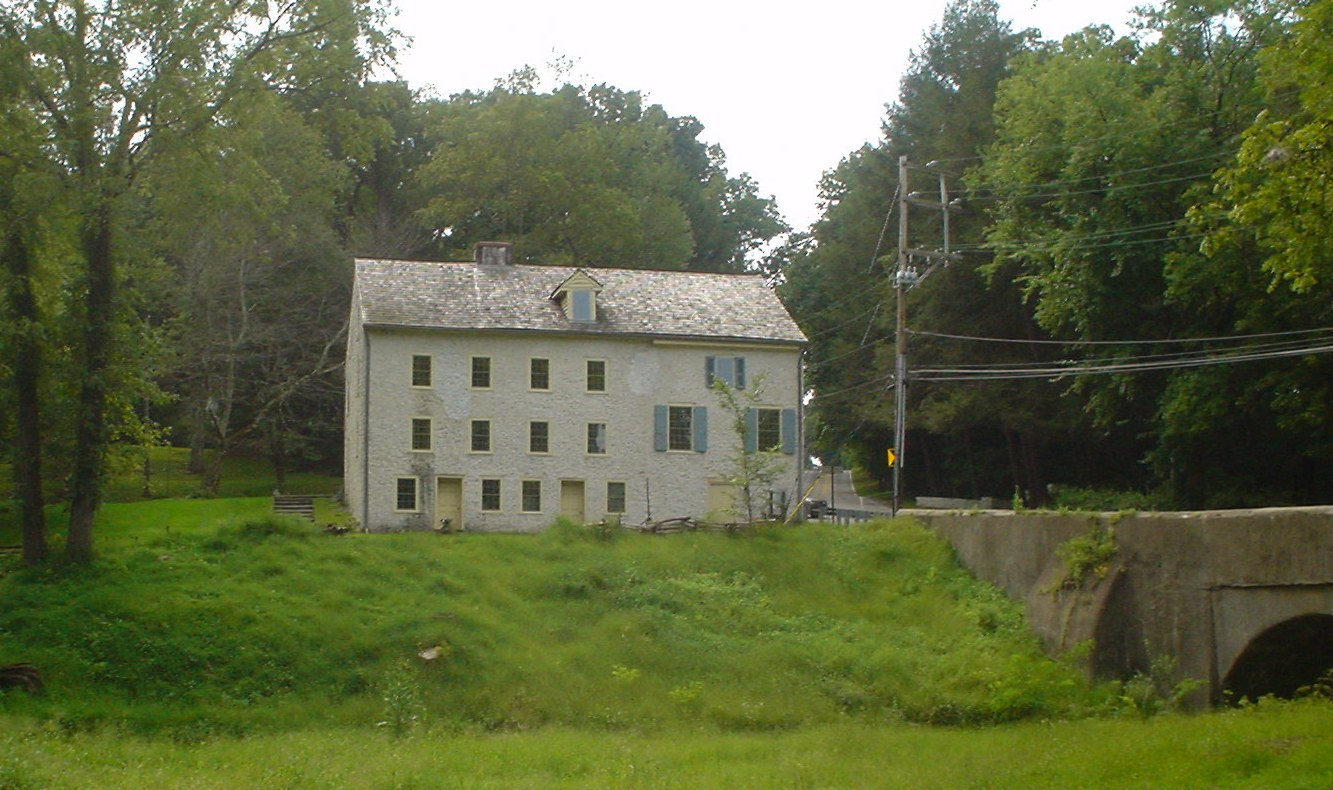
- Crosley-Garrett Mill Workers' Housing and Store, November 2009

- Location within Pennsylvania Location within the United States
- Location: Paper Mill Rd. and St. David's rd., Newtown Township, Pennsylvania
- Coordinates: 40°1′9″N 75°24′16″W
- Area: 4.4 acres (1.8 ha)
- Built: 1828
- Architectural style: Federal
- NRHP reference No.: 03000074
- Added to NRHP: February 27, 2003

The Crosley–Garrett Mill Workers' Housing, Store, and Mill Site, also known as Paper Mill House and the William Crosley Store and Mill Workers' House, is a historic mill-related complex located on Darby Creek in Newtown Township, Delaware County, Pennsylvania. The complex consists of a four-family stone Workers' Housing unit (1828), with an attached store (1845), and the archaeological remains of William Crosley's Woolen Mill (1828-1861) and Casper S. Garrett's Union Paper Mill (1869-1889). The buildings house the Paper Mill House Museum and headquarters of the Newtown Square Historical Society.

It was added to the National Register of Historic Places in 2003.
