= National Register of Historic Places listings in Delaware County, Pennsylvania =

Location of Delaware County in Pennsylvania

Delaware County, Pennsylvania, United States, has 101 properties and districts listed on the National Register of Historic Places. Seven sites are further designated as National Historic Landmarks. Another property was once listed but has been removed.

The locations of National Register properties and districts for which the latitude and longitude coordinates are included below, may be seen in a map.

This National Park Service list is complete through NPS recent listings posted August 7, 2026.

== Current listings ==
	Name on the Register	Image	Date listed	Location	Municipality	Description
1	1724 Chester Courthouse	1724 Chester Courthouse	May 27, 1971 (#71000702)	Market Street below 5th Street; 39°50′52″N 75°21′36″W	Chester	
2	Henry Albertson Subdivision Historic District	Henry Albertson Subdivision Historic District	January 30, 1998 (#98000044)	Roughly bounded by North Lansdowne, Clover, Wycombe, Price, and Stewart Avenues, and Balfour Cir. 39°56′34″N 75°16′21″W	Lansdowne	
3	Allgates	Allgates	May 15, 1979 (#79002222)	Coopertown Road; 39°59′54″N 75°19′36″W	Haverford Township	Wilson Eyre, architect (1910, expanded 1917).
4	Bartram's Covered Bridge	Bartram's Covered Bridge	December 10, 1980 (#80003462)	West of Newtown on Legislative Route 15098; 39°59′23″N 75°26′15″W	Newtown Township	Extends into Willistown Township in Chester County
5	Booth Farm	Booth Farm	June 13, 2003 (#03000527)	3221 Foulk Road; 39°51′15″N 75°29′24″W	Bethel Township	
6	Brandywine Battlefield	Brandywine Battlefield	October 15, 1966 (#66000660)	Brandywine Battlefield Park; 39°53′17″N 75°35′37″W	Chadds Ford Township	
7	Brandywine Summit Camp Meeting	Brandywine Summit Camp Meeting	February 24, 1995 (#95000132)	119 Beaver Valley Road, Chadds Ford; 39°51′04″N 75°32′50″W	Concord Township	
8	Bridge in Radnor Township No. 1	Bridge in Radnor Township No. 1	June 22, 1988 (#88000791)	Goshen Road over Darby Creek; 40°00′13″N 75°22′19″W	Radnor Township	
9	Bridge in Radnor Township No. 2	Bridge in Radnor Township No. 2	June 22, 1988 (#88000784)	Bryn Mawr Avenue over Meadow Brook Creek; 40°00′41″N 75°20′39″W	Radnor Township	
10	Camp-Woods	Camp-Woods	September 1, 1983 (#83002239)	745 Newtown Road; 40°01′15″N 75°22′30″W	Radnor Township	
11	Campbell African Methodist Episcopal Church of Media		August 12, 2026 (#100013322)	33 W Third Street; 39°55′15″N 75°23′25″W	Media	
12	Chad House	Chad House	March 11, 1971 (#71000698)	Pennsylvania Route 100; 39°52′29″N 75°35′31″W	Chadds Ford Township	
13	Chadds Ford Historic District	Chadds Ford Historic District	November 23, 1971 (#71000699)	Junction of U.S. Route 1 and Pennsylvania Route 100; 39°52′17″N 75°35′31″W	Chadds Ford Township	
14	Chamberlain-Pennell House	Chamberlain-Pennell House	December 27, 1977 (#77001165)	West of Media off U.S. Route 1 at Valley Brook Road; 39°53′52″N 75°28′47″W	Chester Heights	
15	Chanticleer	Chanticleer	July 24, 1984 (#84003350)	786 Church Road; 40°01′50″N 75°23′12″W	Radnor Township	
16	Chester Creek Historic District	Chester Creek Historic District	March 24, 1972 (#72001120)	North, east, and south of Glen Mills along the western branch of Chester Creek; 39°55′23″N 75°29′27″W	Thornbury Township	
17	Chester Heights Camp Meeting Historic District	Chester Heights Camp Meeting Historic District	May 8, 2001 (#01000460)	320 Valley Brook Road; 39°53′24″N 75°28′03″W	Chester Heights	
18	Chester Waterside Station of the Philadelphia Electric Company	Chester Waterside Station of the Philadelphia Electric Company	May 24, 2007 (#07000467)	2501 Seaport Dr. 39°49′45″N 75°23′02″W	Chester	
19	John Cheyney Log Tenant House and Farm	John Cheyney Log Tenant House and Farm	November 21, 1978 (#78002390)	Station Road; 39°55′50″N 75°30′52″W	Thornbury Township	
20	Chichester Friends Meetinghouse	Chichester Friends Meetinghouse	March 14, 1973 (#73001622)	611 Meetinghouse Road; 39°50′11″N 75°25′53″W	Upper Chichester Township	
21	Collen Brook Farm	Collen Brook Farm	December 22, 1988 (#88003048)	Off Mansion and Marvine Roads; 39°57′05″N 75°19′16″W	Upper Darby Township	Home of Abolitionist George Smith
22	Concord Friends Meetinghouse	Concord Friends Meetinghouse	June 17, 1977 (#77001164)	Old Concord Road; 39°53′07″N 75°31′13″W	Concord Township	
23	Concordville Historic District	Concordville Historic District	April 3, 1973 (#73001624)	Concord Road and Baltimore Pike; 39°53′09″N 75°31′15″W	Concord Township	
24	Crosley-Garrett Mill Workers' Housing, Store and Mill Site	Crosley-Garrett Mill Workers' Housing, Store and Mill Site	February 27, 2003 (#03000074)	Paper Mill Road and St. David's Road; 40°01′09″N 75°24′16″W	Newtown Township	
25	George K. Crozer Mansion	George K. Crozer Mansion	August 14, 1973 (#73001625)	6th Street; 39°51′19″N 75°23′16″W	Upland	Destroyed by fire in June 1990, and subsequently demolished.
26	John P. Crozer II Mansion	John P. Crozer II Mansion	July 23, 1980 (#80003486)	900, 922, 924 and 926 Main Street; 39°51′31″N 75°23′00″W	Upland	
27	Darby Meeting	Darby Meeting	September 13, 1978 (#78002392)	1017 Main Street; 39°55′15″N 75°15′48″W	Darby	
28	Delaware Boundary Markers		February 18, 1975 (#75002101)	Boundary line dividing Delaware from Maryland and Pennsylvania	Multiple	Extends into Delaware and eastern Maryland.
29	Delaware County National Bank	Delaware County National Bank	November 5, 1987 (#87001947)	1 West Third Street; 39°50′49″N 75°21′34″W	Chester	
30	Downtown Wayne Historic District	Downtown Wayne Historic District	September 5, 2012 (#12000607)	Roughly bounded by Louella Ct., West Ave., and S. Wayne Ave., at Wayne; 40°02′41″N 75°23′07″W	Radnor Township	
31	Eden Cemetery	Eden Cemetery	December 13, 2010 (#10001031)	1434 Springfield Rd. 39°55′20″N 75°16′24″W	Collingdale	
32	Federal School	Federal School	November 5, 1971 (#71000704)	Haverford-Darby Road; 39°59′48″N 75°19′34″W	Haverford Township	
33	Forge Hill	Forge Hill	March 7, 1973 (#73001627)	Off U.S. Route 1; 39°54′02″N 75°27′48″W	Chester Heights	
34	Gilpin Homestead	Gilpin Homestead	May 27, 1971 (#71000700)	Harvey Road; 39°53′02″N 75°33′50″W	Chadds Ford Township	
35	Glenays	Glenays	December 27, 1977 (#77001163)	926 Coopertown Road; 40°00′41″N 75°19′49″W	Radnor Township	
36	The Grange	The Grange	January 11, 1976 (#76001636)	Grove Pl. 39°58′33″N 75°17′05″W	Haverford Township	
37	Handwrought	Handwrought	January 18, 1978 (#78002391)	Concord and Station Road; 39°52′52″N 75°30′52″W	Concord Township	
38	High Hill Farm	High Hill Farm	August 21, 1986 (#86001784)	180 Thornton Road; 39°53′48″N 75°31′30″W	Concord Township	
39	Hood Octagonal School	Hood Octagonal School	February 14, 2006 (#06000045)	3500 West Chester Pike, Newtown Square; 39°59′10″N 75°23′22″W	Newtown Township	On grounds of Dunwoody Village
40	Idlewild	Idlewild	May 8, 2013 (#13000255)	110 Idlewild Circle; 39°54′44″N 75°23′18″W	Upper Providence Township	Summer cottage owned and designed by Frank Furness
41	Ivy Mills Historic District	Ivy Mills Historic District	August 21, 1972 (#72001117)	Corner of Ivy Mills and Pole Cat Roads; 39°53′10″N 75°29′14″W	Concord Township	
42	Lansdowne Park Historic District	Lansdowne Park Historic District	November 5, 1987 (#87001986)	West Greenwood, Owen, West Baltimore, Windermere, and West Stratford Avenues; 39°56′22″N 75°16′33″W	Lansdowne	
43	Lansdowne Theatre	Lansdowne Theatre	January 6, 1987 (#86003575)	29 North Lansdowne Avenue; 39°56′20″N 75°16′20″W	Lansdowne	
44	The Lazaretto	The Lazaretto	March 16, 1972 (#72001119)	Wanamaker Avenue and 2nd Street; 39°51′38″N 75°18′02″W	Tinicum Township	
45	Thomas Leiper Estate	Thomas Leiper Estate	December 29, 1970 (#70000547)	Avondale Road; 39°53′12″N 75°21′30″W	Nether Providence Township	
46	Llanerch Public School	Llanerch Public School	April 10, 2017 (#100000855)	5 Llandillo Rd. 39°58′20″N 75°17′59″W	Haverford Township	
47	Lower Swedish Cabin	Lower Swedish Cabin	June 9, 1980 (#80003484)	Creek Road; 39°56′05″N 75°17′43″W	Upper Darby Township	Log Cabin built by Swedish Settlers in the 17th century
48	Marcus Hook Plank House	Marcus Hook Plank House	April 10, 2017 (#100000856)	221 Market St. 39°48′49″N 75°24′45″W	Marcus Hook	
49	Thomas Massey House	Thomas Massey House	November 16, 1970 (#70000904)	Lawrence and Springhouse Roads; 39°57′57″N 75°21′07″W	Marple Township	
50	Media Armory	Media Armory	December 22, 1989 (#89002077)	12 East State Street; 39°55′06″N 75°23′20″W	Media	William Lightfoot Price, architect.
51	Melrose	Melrose	September 4, 1986 (#86001780)	Hill Dr. 39°55′56″N 75°31′38″W	Thornbury Township	
52	Merion Golf Club, East and West Courses	Merion Golf Club, East and West Courses	December 21, 1989 (#89002085)	Ardmore Avenue; 39°59′36″N 75°19′35″W	Haverford Township	
53	Miller-Leedom-Dickinson House		February 9, 2026 (#100012705)	570 Mill Road; 39°59′14″N 75°17′36″W	Haverford Township	
54	Morton Homestead	Morton Homestead	December 2, 1970 (#70000546)	100 Lincoln Avenue; 39°52′37″N 75°18′21″W	Prospect Park	
55	Morton Morton House	Morton Morton House	February 4, 2000 (#00000055)	Junction of Muckinipates and Darby Creeks; 39°52′50″N 75°17′27″W	Norwood	
56	Newlin Mill Complex	Newlin Mill Complex	March 9, 1983 (#83002240)	South Cheyney Road; 39°53′25″N 75°30′22″W	Concord Township	
57	Nicholas Newlin House	Nicholas Newlin House	April 26, 1972 (#72001118)	Concord Road; 39°53′10″N 75°31′19″W	Concord Township	
58	Nitre Hall	Nitre Hall	December 18, 1970 (#70000545)	Karakung Dr. 39°59′01″N 75°17′09″W	Haverford Township	
59	North Wayne Historic District	North Wayne Historic District	July 25, 1985 (#85001619)	Roughly bounded by Eagle Road, Woodland Ct., Radnor Street, Poplar, and North Wayne Avenue; 40°02′59″N 75°23′12″W	Radnor Township	
60	Ogden House	Ogden House	November 20, 1979 (#79002223)	530 Cedar Lane; 39°54′41″N 75°21′04″W	Swarthmore	
61	Old Main	Old Main	June 18, 1973 (#73001626)	21st Street and Upland Avenue; 39°51′21″N 75°22′17″W	Upland	
62	Old Main and Chemistry Building	Old Main and Chemistry Building	May 22, 1978 (#78002389)	14th Street between Melrose Avenue and Walnut Street; 39°51′42″N 75°21′19″W	Chester	
63	Old Rose Tree Tavern	Old Rose Tree Tavern	June 21, 1971 (#71000705)	Northeast of the junction of Rose Tree and Providence Roads; 39°56′17″N 75°23′34″W	Upper Providence Township	Inside Rose Tree Park
64	Painter's Folly	Painter's Folly	May 23, 2024 (#100010360)	1421 Baltimore Pike; 39°52′26″N 75°34′13″W	Chadds Ford Township	
65	William Painter Farm	William Painter Farm	July 27, 1971 (#71000701)	2 miles (3.2 km) northeast of Chadds Ford on U.S. Route 1; 39°52′42″N 75°33′10″W	Chadds Ford Township	
66	William Penn Landing Site	William Penn Landing Site	March 11, 1971 (#71000703)	Penn and Front Streets; 39°50′36″N 75°21′41″W	Chester	
67	Pennsylvania Railroad Station at Wayne	Pennsylvania Railroad Station at Wayne	May 7, 1999 (#99000674)	Junction of North Wayne Avenue and Station Road; 40°02′44″N 75°23′16″W	Radnor Township	
68	Pont Reading	Pont Reading	October 26, 1972 (#72001116)	2713 Haverford Road; 39°59′47″N 75°18′10″W	Haverford Township	
69	The Printzhof	The Printzhof	October 15, 1966 (#66000661)	Taylor Avenue and 2nd Street; 39°51′40″N 75°18′11″W	Tinicum Township	
70	Caleb Pusey House	Caleb Pusey House	March 11, 1971 (#71000706)	15 Race Street; 39°51′04″N 75°23′13″W	Upland	
71	Pusey-Crozier Mill Historic District	Pusey-Crozier Mill Historic District	September 27, 1976 (#76001638)	Race Street; 39°51′05″N 75°23′12″W	Upland	
72	Radnor Friends Meetinghouse	Radnor Friends Meetinghouse	August 31, 1978 (#78002393)	Sproul and Conestoga Roads; 40°01′48″N 75°21′53″W	Radnor Township	
73	Ridley Creek State Park	Ridley Creek State Park	October 8, 1976 (#76001637)	Northwest of Media between Pennsylvania Routes 3 and 352; 39°57′13″N 75°26′41″W	Edgmont, Middletown, and Upper Providence Townships	
74	Dr. Samuel D. Risley House	Dr. Samuel D. Risley House	April 26, 1990 (#90000697)	430 North Monroe Street; 39°55′19″N 75°23′14″W	Media	
75	Rose Valley Historic District	Rose Valley Historic District	July 19, 2010 (#10000470)	Roughly bounded by Ridley Creek, Woodward Rd., Providence and Brookhaven Rds. and Todmorden Ln. within Rose Valley Borough; 39°53′46″N 75°23′06″W	Rose Valley	
76	Sacred Heart General Hospital	Sacred Heart General Hospital	July 26, 2024 (#100010576)	2600 W. 9th Street; 39°50′15″N 75°23′35″W	Chester	
77	St. David's Church and Graveyard	St. David's Church and Graveyard	September 20, 1978 (#78002394)	7 miles (11 km) north of Media; 40°01′37″N 75°24′16″W	Radnor Township	
78	St. Joseph's Parish Complex	St. Joseph's Parish Complex	May 29, 2018 (#100002522)	500 Woodlawn Ave; 39°54′48″N 75°17′00″W	Collingdale	
79	Saturday Club	Saturday Club	March 14, 1978 (#78002395)	117 West Wayne Avenue; 40°02′36″N 75°23′21″W	Radnor Township	
80	Second Street Bridge	Second Street Bridge	June 22, 1988 (#88000752)	Pennsylvania Route 291/Second Street over Chester Creek; 39°50′41″N 75°21′39″W	Chester	Destroyed
81	Sellers Hall	Sellers Hall	April 18, 2018 (#100002339)	NW corner of Hampden Rd. & Walnut St. 39°57′25″N 75°15′40″W	Upper Darby Township	
82	Seventeen-hundred-and-four House	Seventeen-hundred-and-four House	December 24, 1967 (#67000018)	Oakland Road, near junction of U.S. Route 202 and County Road 15199; 39°53′47″N 75°33′40″W	Chadds Ford Township	
83	Pennock E. Sharpless House	Pennock E. Sharpless House	September 9, 2024 (#100010758)	684 Concord Road; 39°52′49″N 75°30′42″W	Glen Mills	
84	South Wayne Historic District	South Wayne Historic District	April 18, 1991 (#91000477)	Roughly bounded by Lancaster Avenue, Conestoga Road and Iven Avenue, Radnor Township; 40°02′22″N 75°22′59″W	Radnor Township	
85	Square Tavern	Square Tavern	September 7, 1984 (#84003353)	Newtown Street Road and Goshen Road; 39°59′46″N 75°24′30″W	Newtown Township	
86	Stonehaven	Stonehaven	October 24, 1996 (#96001197)	484 Lenni Road, junction with New Road; 39°53′35″N 75°27′09″W	Chester Heights	
87	Swarthmore Borough Center Historic District		May 7, 2026 (#100012966)	Roughly bounded by the railroad and Myers Ave to the north, Chester Road and Rutgers Ave to the east, Lincoln Ave and Lafayette Ave to the west, and the Postal Office and Swarthmore United Methodist to the south 39°54′08″N 75°21′00″W	Swarthmore	
88	Third Presbyterian Church	Third Presbyterian Church	November 26, 2019 (#100004702)	420 E. 9th St. 39°51′16″N 75°21′22″W	Chester	
89	Thompson Cottage	Thompson Cottage	April 13, 1977 (#77001166)	Southeast of West Chester on Thornton Road; 39°53′38″N 75°31′24″W	Concord Township	
90	Thornton Village Historic District	Thornton Village Historic District	November 14, 2006 (#06000745)	Centered on Thornton and Glen Mills Roads; 39°54′36″N 75°31′54″W	Thornbury Township	
91	Thunderbird Lodge	Thunderbird Lodge	August 18, 1989 (#89001053)	45 Rose Valley Road; 39°53′55″N 75°23′17″W	Rose Valley	William Lightfoot Price, architect.
92	Twaddell's Mill and House	Twaddell's Mill and House	March 7, 1973 (#73001623)	Rock Hill Road south of Chadds Ford; 39°50′39″N 75°34′43″W	Chadds Ford Township	
93	Twentieth Century Club of Lansdowne	Twentieth Century Club of Lansdowne	July 23, 1980 (#80003485)	84 South Lansdowne Avenue; 39°56′08″N 75°16′24″W	Lansdowne	
94	Twin Bridges Rural Historic District	Twin Bridges Rural Historic District	September 18, 2017 (#100001635)	Roughly bounded by Creek and Bullock Rds., the Beverly Farm, Big Bend, and Hill Girt Farms estates, and Brandywine Creek; 39°51′05″N 75°35′12″W	Chadds Ford Township	Extends into Pennsbury Township in Chester County
95	John J. Tyler Arboretum	John J. Tyler Arboretum	February 27, 2003 (#03000080)	515 Painter Road; 39°56′05″N 75°25′52″W	Middletown Township	
96	Wayne Hotel	Wayne Hotel	November 5, 1987 (#87001966)	139 East Lancaster Avenue; 40°02′38″N 75°23′12″W	Radnor Township	
97	Benjamin West Birthplace	Benjamin West Birthplace	October 15, 1966 (#66000662)	Swarthmore College campus 39°54′18″N 75°21′06″W	Swarthmore	
98	Westlawn	Westlawn	November 18, 1988 (#88002188)	123 North Providence Road; 39°54′23″N 75°22′37″W	Nether Providence Township	
99	Williamson Free School of Mechanical Trades	Williamson Free School of Mechanical Trades	October 6, 2022 (#100008235)	106 South New Middletown Rd. 39°54′34″N 75°25′11″W	Middletown Township	
100	Wolley Stille	Wolley Stille	June 27, 1980 (#80003487)	Harvey Road; 39°52′28″N 75°21′58″W	Nether Providence Township	
101	Woodcrest	Woodcrest	December 30, 2008 (#08001265)	610 King of Prussia Road, Cabrini College campus 40°03′16″N 75°22′30″W	Radnor Township	
102	Andrew Wyeth Studio and Kuerner Farm	Andrew Wyeth Studio and Kuerner Farm	July 11, 2011 (#11000564)	14 Ring Road; also 415 Ring Road and 1821 Murphy Road; 39°52′09″N 75°34′32″W	Chadds Ford Township	The Kuerner Farm was the inspiration for more than 1,000 Wyeth paintings over a 64-year period. Second set of addresses represents a boundary increase of August 25, 2014
103	N. C. Wyeth House and Studio	N. C. Wyeth House and Studio	December 9, 1997 (#97001680)	Murphy Road; 39°51′59″N 75°35′09″W	Chadds Ford Township	Home and studio of painter N.C. Wyeth and family. Managed by the Brandywine River Museum
104	Ellis Porter Yarnall House	Ellis Porter Yarnall House	August 14, 2025 (#100012141)	764 Concord Road; 39°52′57″N 75°30′59″W	Glen Mills	

== Former listing ==
	Name on the Register	Image	Date listed	Date removed	Location	City or town	Description
1	Bridge in Ridley Park Borough		May 10, 1988 (#88000819)	March 1, 1993	W. Ridley Ave. over Little Crum Creek; 39°52′32″N 75°19′49″W	Ridley Park	Damaged by two storms in 1988 and 1989. Subsequently removed.

== See also ==
- List of National Historic Landmarks in Pennsylvania
- National Register of Historic Places listings in Pennsylvania
- Listings in neighboring counties: Philadelphia, Chester, Montgomery, New Castle County, Delaware,
- List of Pennsylvania state historical markers in Delaware County
