= Thomas Willcox =

Paper mill owner of Pennsylvania, United States

- Born: 1689; Exeter, Devonshire, England
- Died: 1779 (aged 89–90)
- Occupation: Paper mill owner

Thomas Willcox (1689 - 1779) was a colonial-era paper mill owner in Concord Township, Delaware County, Colony of Pennsylvania. The Ivy Mills supplied paper used for currency for the Continental and United States governments as well as many South American governments. Willcox was a friend of Benjamin Franklin, made printing paper for him and received the first orders for paper used in colonial American currency from him.

The ruins of the paper mill, erected in 1829; the clerk's house, dated to about 1830; and the Ivy Mills Mansion House, built in 1837 are listed on the National Register of Historic Places as the Ivy Mills Historic District. Ivy Mills is the second oldest paper mill built in America.

== Career ==
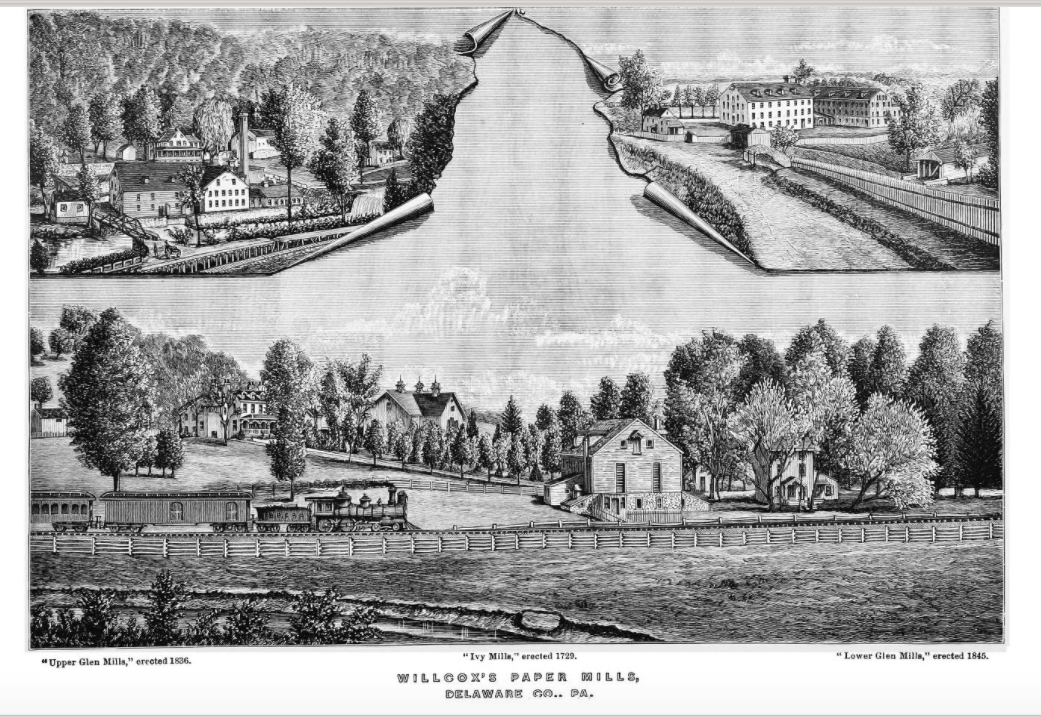
Wilcox Paper Mill

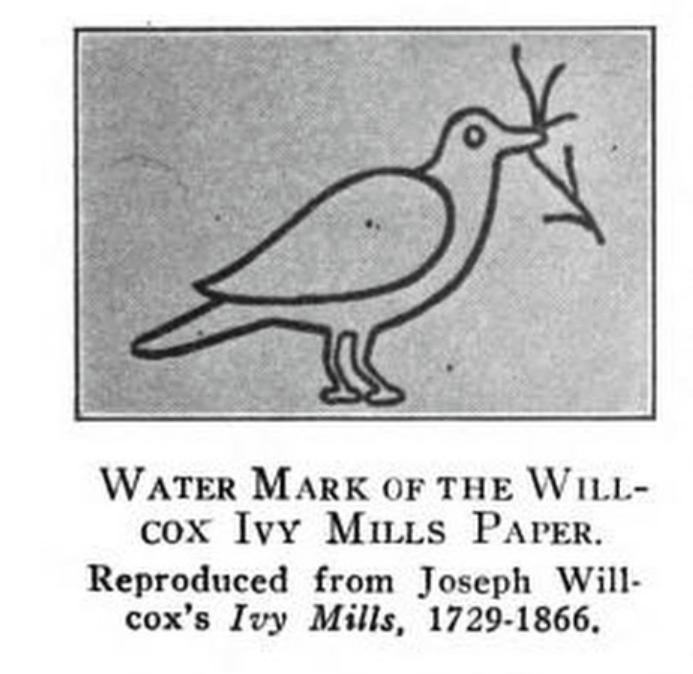

In 1726, Thomas Willcox, along with Thomas Brown, constructed a mill dam across Chester Creek. Soon afterward, a paper mill was built and in 1729 the first paper produced at the site was sold. Willcox learned paper making prior to coming to Pennsylvania and the arrangement was that he should receive three-fifths of the profit of the joint undertaking.

Brown and Willcox continued their partnership until 1732 when Willcox leased Brown's interest in the operation. In 1739, Willcox bought Brown out completely. Thomas Willcox passed the mill and property on to his son Mark.

The first output from Ivy Mills was pressboard and then printing paper. After 1775, the mill was devoted almost entirely to making government paper for the continental bills, loan certificates and bills of exchange. At the time of the revolution, the government depended entirely on Ivy Mills for paper for currency.

Thomas Willcox left the mill and property to his son Mark and to other Willcoxes until paper manufacturing at the mill ceased in 1886.

== Missionary Work ==
Thomas Willcox and his family were of Roman Catholic faith and are believed to be the oldest Roman Catholic family in Pennsylvania. The Willcox family opened their home as a regular stop to Jesuit priests traveling from Maryland to preach to Christians in Philadelphia. A mission chapel was established at Ivy Mills in 1730, making it the oldest Roman Catholic parish in Pennsylvania. In 1837, St. Mary's Chapel was built as part of the new Ivy Mills Mansion. Eventually the size of the congregation was sufficient to warrant the construction of a new church in 1852 named St. Thomas the Apostle Church a mile away in what would become the borough of Chester Heights.

== Personal life ==
Willcox was originally from Exeter and emigrated to Concord Township with his wife Elizabeth (née Cole) in 1718. Thomas and Elizabeth Willcox had nine children, John, Anne, James, Elizabeth, Mary, Deborah, Thomas, Mark and Margaret.
