= Concord Township, Delaware County, Pennsylvania =

Township in Pennsylvania, US

Concord Township
- Township
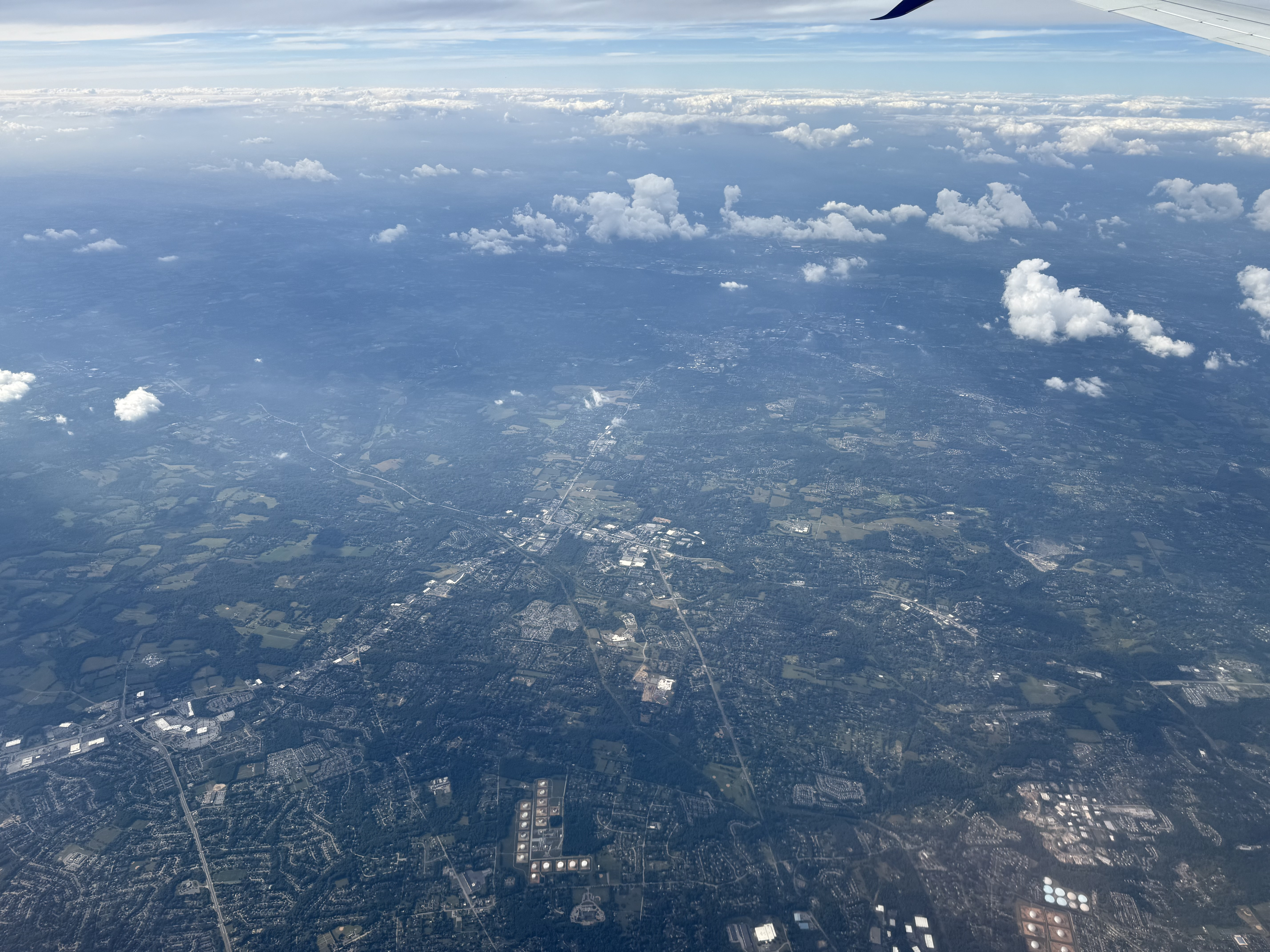
- Aerial view of Concord Township

- Seal

- Location in Delaware County and the state of Pennsylvania.

- Location of Pennsylvania in the United States
- Coordinates: 39°52′39″N 75°29′29″W
- Country: United States
- State: Pennsylvania
- County: Delaware
- Incorporation: 1683

Area
  - Total: 13.64 sq mi (35.34 km^{2})
  - Land: 13.62 sq mi (35.28 km^{2})
  - Water: 0.023 sq mi (0.06 km^{2})
- Elevation: 338 ft (103 m)

Population (2020)
  - Total: 18,295
  - Density: 1,343/sq mi (518.5/km^{2})
- Time zone: UTC-5 (EST)
  - Summer (DST): UTC-4 (EDT)
- Area code: 610
- FIPS code: 42-045-15488
- Website: www.townshipofconcord.com

Concord Township is a township in Delaware County, Pennsylvania, United States. The population was 18,295 at the 2020 census. It contains the unincorporated communities of Concordville and Glen Mills.

== Geography ==
According to the United States Census Bureau, the township has a total area of 13.6 square miles (35 km^{2}), of which 13.6 square miles (35 km^{2}) is land and 0.02 square miles (0.052 km^{2}) (0.16%) is water.

Concord Township is located in southwestern Delaware County and is bordered by Chadds Ford Township to the west, Thornbury Township to the north, Chester Heights to the east and Bethel Township to the southeast. A portion of the southern border of the township sits along the border-arc between Pennsylvania and Delaware known as the 12-mile circle. Concord Township is in both the Brandywine Creek and Chester Creek watersheds.

One of the busiest intersections in the state, where U.S. Route 1 and U.S. Route 202 meet, is locally known as "Painters Crossing". While there are no boroughs or other major population centers in the township, the unincorporated area known as Concordville has historical houses and a Quaker meetinghouse dating from the early colonial period.

== Demographics ==
Historical population
Census	Pop.	Note	%±
1930	1,546		—
1940	2,076		34.3%
1950	1,945		−6.3%
1960	3,149		61.9%
1970	4,592		45.8%
1980	6,437		40.2%
1990	6,933		7.7%
2000	9,933		43.3%
2010	17,231		73.5%
2020	18,295		6.2%

At the 2010 census, there were 17,231 people, 6,193 households and 4,168 families residing in the township. The population density was 1,257.7 per square mile (485.6/km^{2}). There were 6,711 housing units. The racial make-up of the township was 86.1% White, 6.9% African American, 0.1% Native American, 5.1% Asian, 0.6% from other races and 1.2% from two or more races. Hispanic or Latino of any race were 2.0% of the population.

There were 4,168 households, of which 29.4% had children under the age of 18, 59.7% were married couples living together, 5.3% had a female householder with no husband present and 32.7% were non-families. 28.9% of all households were made up of individuals and 18.3% were individuals living alone 65 years of age or older. The average household size was 2.5 and the average family size was 3.13.

22.1% of the population were under the age of 18, 8.1% from 18 to 24, 22.5% from 25 to 44, 26.5% from 45 to 64 and 20.8% were 65 years of age or older. The median age was 43.4 years. For every 100 females, there were 104.3 males. For every 100 females age 18 and over, there were 105.4 males.

The median household income (2010 inflation-adjusted dollars) was $86,680 and the median family income was $121,389. Males had a median income of $91,470 and females $58,555. The per capita income was $42,358. About 4.0% of families and 4.8% of the population were below the poverty line, including 6.8% of those under age 18 and 3.2% of those age 65 or over.

== History ==
Concord Township is first mentioned in court records on June 27, 1683, when John Mendenhall was appointed constable of "Concord liberty".

The paper for the first currency printed by the Continental Congress was made at the Ivy Mills founded by Thomas Willcox and Thomas Brown. The Ivy Mills was the second oldest paper mill in the United States. The mill made printing paper for Benjamin Franklin and paper for currency for several Continental governments, the US government and many South American countries. The oldest Roman Catholic parish in Pennsylvania began as a mission at the home of the Willcox family in 1730. The church was later moved approximately one mile east to the top of the hill into what later became the Borough of Chester Heights and is known as St. Thomas the Apostle Church.

In 1702, the St. John's Episcopal Church was founded on land donated by John Hannum, a successful farmer and tavern owner who was baptized by the former Quaker George Keith. Keith was known to conduct services at the Hannum home on Concord Road.

The Newlin Grist Mill has been grinding grain since 1704. It has an 11 feet (3.4 m) tall stone wheel housed in a timber frame. The mill and processing complex passed through various hands and, in the 1950s, it was purchased by a direct descendant of Nicholas Newlin, which along with 200 acres (81 ha) of surrounding countryside became the Newlin Mill Historic Park. The mill complex area was the location of the Markham post office and Markham train station (Philadelphia/Baltimore rail traffic).

The name "Concord" was believed to have been given by the earliest European settlers of the township and reflects the harmonious feelings among them at the time. Title to all real estate in the township can be traced back to a grant from William Penn.

Concord Township was a part of Chester County until 1789, at which point Delaware County was created by act of legislature. Farmers in the northern and western reaches of Chester County were weary of travelling a period of days to the county seat in Chester, on the Delaware River. The seat of Chester County was moved to Turk's Head, now West Chester, and was centrally located in the county.

The Brandywine Summit Camp Meeting, Concord Friends Meetinghouse, Concordville Historic District, Handwrought (also known as the Thomas Marshall House), High Hill Farm, Ivy Mills Historic District, Newlin Mill Complex, Nicholas Newlin House and Thompson Cottage are listed on the National Register of Historic Places.

== Transportation ==
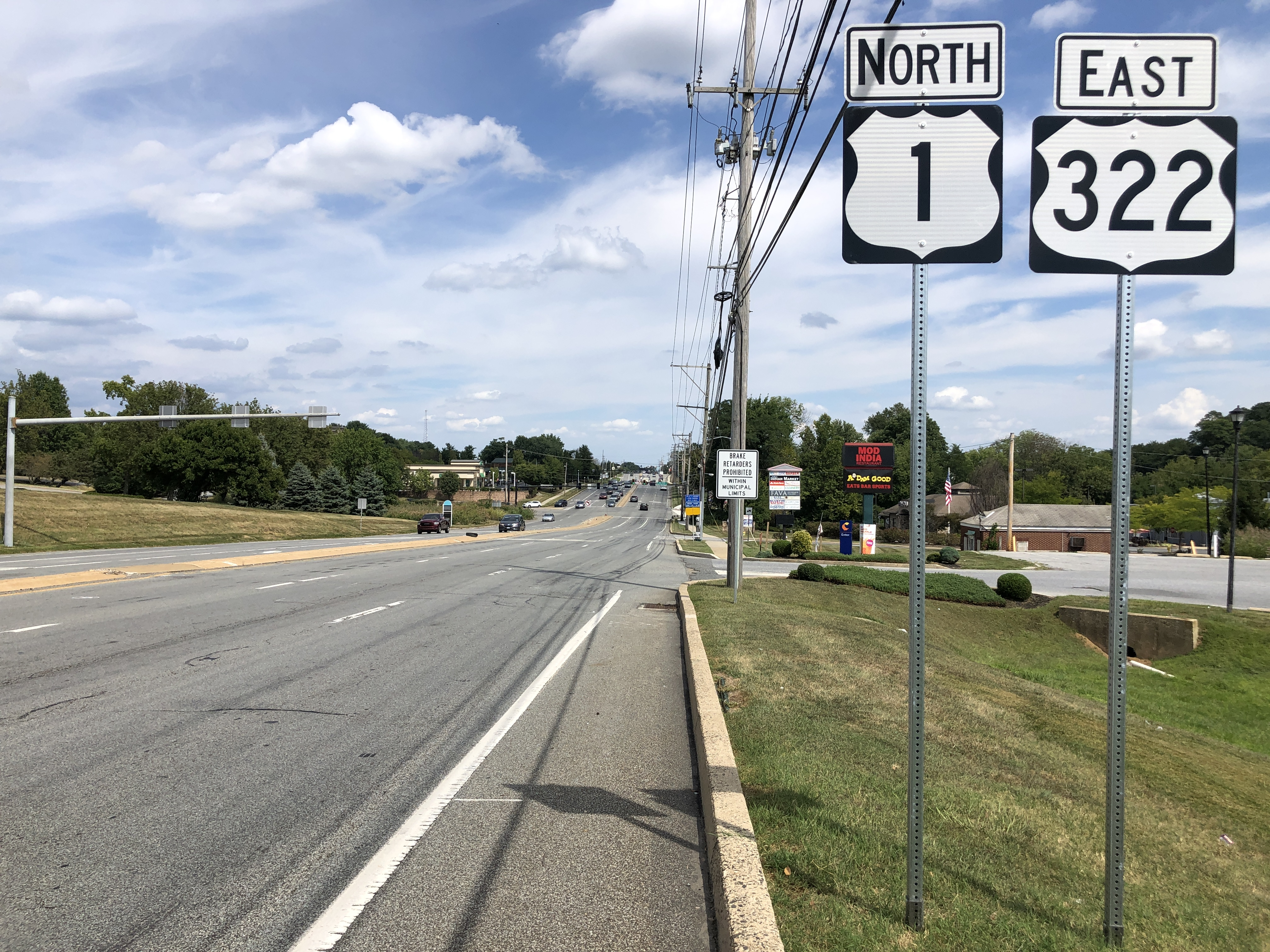
US 1 northbound and US 322 eastbound in Concord Township

As of 2020, there were 85.62 miles (137.79 km) of public roads in Concord Township, of which 30.23 miles (48.65 km) were maintained by Pennsylvania Department of Transportation (PennDOT) and 55.39 miles (89.14 km) were maintained by the township.

U.S. Route 1, U.S. Route 202 and U.S. Route 322 all intersect along the west edge of Concord Township. From that point, US 202 heads south along the Wilmington-West Chester Pike across the southwestern portion of the township, and heads north concurrent with US 322 along the northwestern border. US 1 and US 322 head eastward from their junction with US 202 along Baltimore Pike, with US 1 continuing northeastward across the northern portion of the township and US 322 breaking off to the southeast along Conchester Highway through the central and eastern portions of the township. Pennsylvania Route 491 follows Naamans Creek Road along an east-west alignment across the southern portion of the township, terminating at US 202.

== Government and infrastructure ==
The Delaware County jail, George W. Hill Correctional Facility, is partially in Concord Township, with other parts in Thornbury Township.

== Education ==
Garnet Valley School District serves Concord Township.

Rachel Kohl Library serves Concord Township.

== Notable persons ==
- Kathrynann Durham, Pennsylvania Court of Common Pleas judge and former member of the Pennsylvania House of Representatives
- John Larkin, Jr. - businessman, banker and politician
- William Garrigues Powel - Pennsylvania State representative
- Bam Margera - professional skateboarder, stuntman, daredevil and star of MTV's Jackass and Viva La Bam, lived in the township during Jackass and the first season of Viva La Bam before moving to nearby Pocopson Township, Pennsylvania.
