= Benjamin West Birthplace =

Historic house in Pennsylvania, United States

- U.S. National Register of Historic Places
- U.S. National Historic Landmark
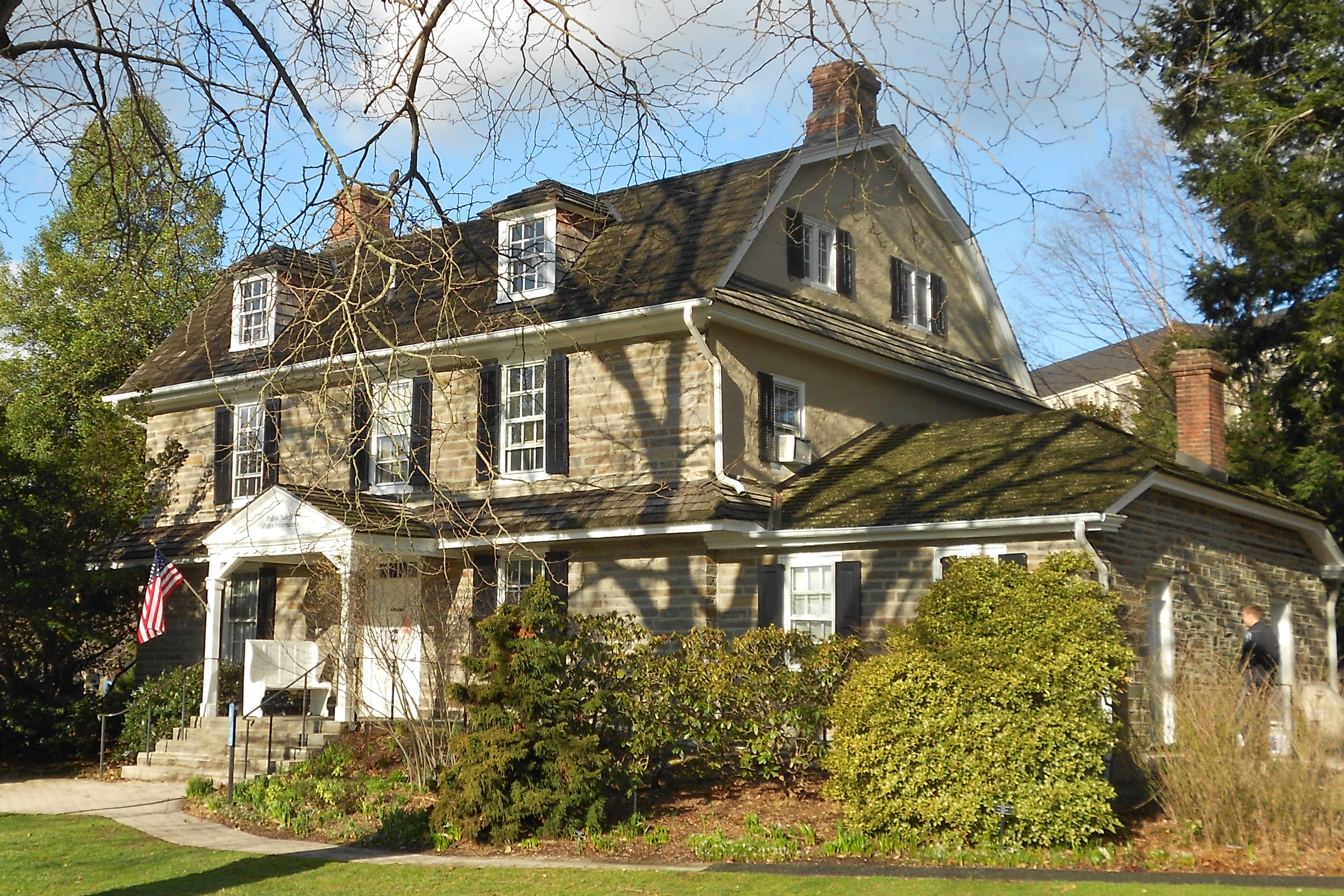
- Benjamin West Birthplace, 2015

- Location within Pennsylvania Location within the United States
- Location: Swarthmore College campus, Swarthmore, Pennsylvania
- Coordinates: 39°54′18″N 75°21′5″W
- Area: less than one acre
- Built: c. 1724
- NRHP reference No.: 66000662

Significant dates
- Added to NRHP: October 15, 1966
- Designated NHL: December 21, 1965

The Benjamin West Birthplace, also known as Benjamin West House, is a historic home located on the campus of Swarthmore College in Swarthmore, Delaware County, Pennsylvania. It was the birthplace of artist Benjamin West (1738–1820), who was an influential mentor to a generation of American painters, including Gilbert Stuart and Charles Willson Peale. His birthplace was declared a National Historic Landmark in 1965, and added to the National Register of Historic Places in 1966. It presently houses the dispatch and offices for the college's campus police, along with a visitor information center.

== Description and history ==
The Benjamin West Birthplace stands on the east side of the Swarthmore campus, just west of North Chester Road off Visitor Center Road. It is a 2 1/2-story stone structure, with a gabled roof pierced by two gabled dormers on each side. The main facade is five bays wide, with a centered entrance sheltered by a gabled portico. The interior does not have any original 18th-century features, the building having been gutted by fire in 1874. At that time its interior was rebuilt, and an ell added to the rear.

The house was reportedly built about 1724, when the area was still part of Springfield Township. Benjamin West was born in this house in 1738 into a Quaker family, but was himself an Anglican for most of his life. He was one of the first American-born artists to be trained in Italy, and settled in England in 1763, where he embarked on a successful career as a painter, working primarily on commission to King George III. He is important in the history of American art for his role in supporting the early careers of a number of Americans who achieved great success, including Gilbert Stuart, Thomas Sully, Rembrandt Peale, and Charles Willson Peale, all of whom he supported both financially and logistically in their development.

== See also ==
- List of National Historic Landmarks in Pennsylvania
- National Register of Historic Places listings in Delaware County, Pennsylvania
