= Thompson Cottage =

Historic house in Pennsylvania, United States

- U.S. National Register of Historic Places
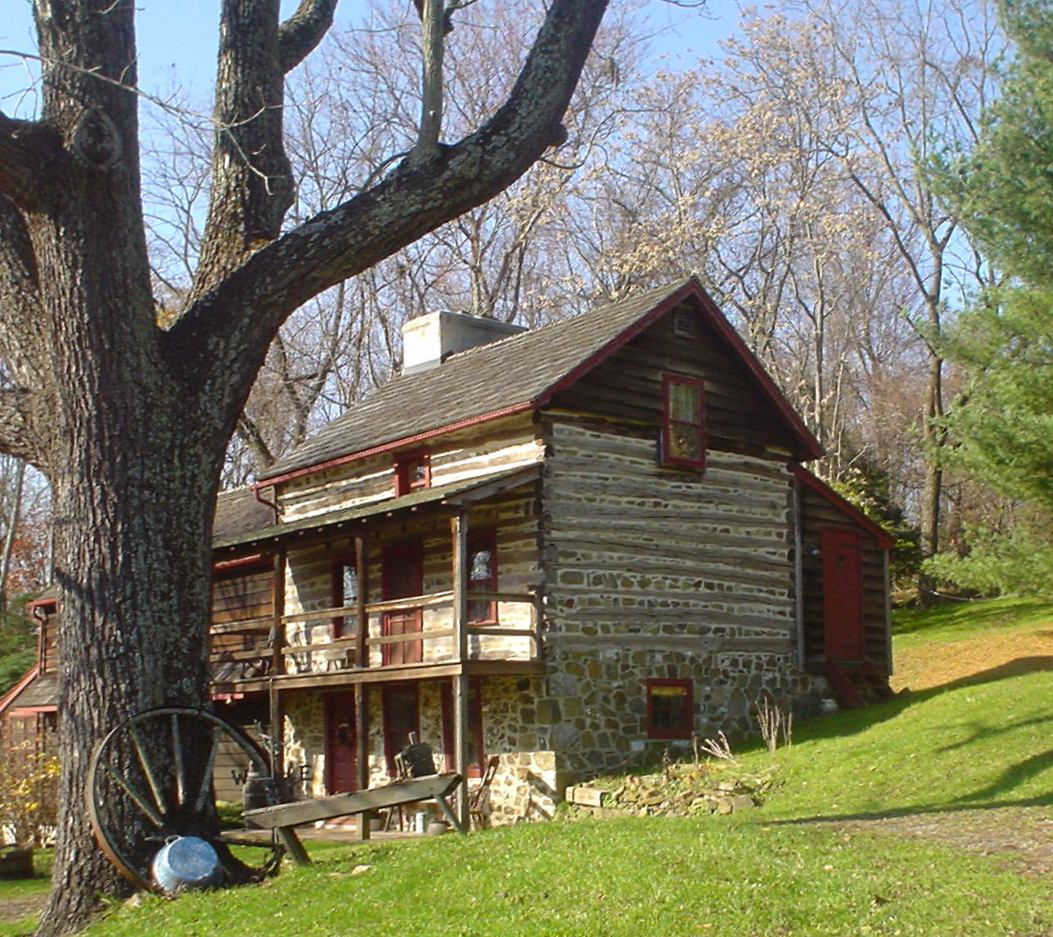
- Thompson Cottage, November 2009

- Location within Pennsylvania Location within the United States
- Location: Southeast of West Chester on Thornton Road, Concord Township, Pennsylvania
- Coordinates: 39°53′38″N 75°31′24″W
- Area: 1 acre (0.40 ha)
- Built: 1775
- Architectural style: Bank House
- NRHP reference No.: 77001166
- Added to NRHP: April 13, 1977

The Thompson Cottage, also known as the James Marshall Cottage, is an historic tenant farmer's house in Concord Township, Delaware County, Pennsylvania, United States.

It was added to the National Register of Historic Places on April 13, 1977.

== History and architectural features ==
Built by James Marshall sometime after 1774, likely near the time of the American Revolution, it was purchased with two acres of land by Thomas Thompson, a free Black, in 1847. He and his descendants lived there until 1971. It is an excellent example of an unaltered eighteenth century tenant farmer's homestead.

== See also ==
- National Register of Historic Places listings in Delaware County, Pennsylvania
