= St. Thomas the Apostle Church (Glen Mills, Pennsylvania) =

Catholic church in Delaware County, Pennsylvania

Coordinates: 39°53′25″N 75°28′27″W

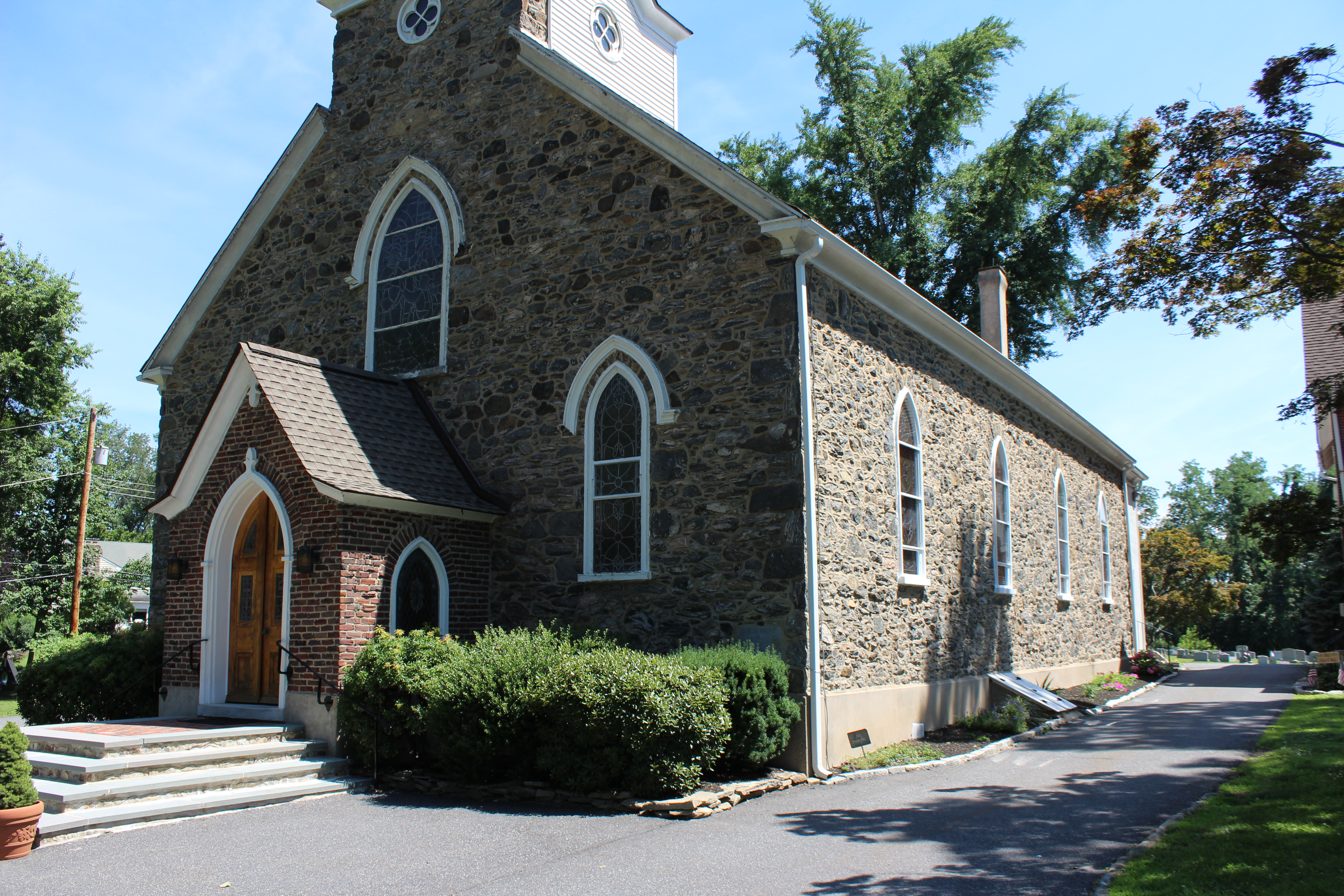
Photo taken in 2017 of the Old St. Thomas's Church built in 1856

St. Thomas the Apostle Church is a Catholic parish located in Glen Mills, Delaware County, Pennsylvania, United States. It was the first parish in the Archdiocese of Philadelphia and the oldest in the state of Pennsylvania. The current church, located at 430 Valleybrook Road, was built in 1856.

== History ==
St. Thomas the Apostle Church originated as a Catholic mission in Delaware County, Pennsylvania in 1730, established at the home of the Thomas Willcox family in Concord Township. In 1837, Saint Mary's Chapel was built as part of the new Willcox mansion, which became an integral part of the area's Catholic heritage. The Willcox mansion and the associated chapel were later recognized on the National Register of Historic Places in 1972 as part of the Ivy Mills Historic District.

On August 26, 1852, a tract of land was purchased from Nicholas F. Walter for the construction of a permanent church. The cost of the new church was primarily funded by James M. Willcox, the proprietor of Ivy Mills. Construction was completed in 1856, and the cornerstone was dedicated by St.John Neumann, who was later canonized as a saint.

In 1957, the parish expanded with the addition of an elementary school and a convent to serve the growing Catholic community. To accommodate increasing numbers, a larger church was built adjacent to the original St. Thomas's Church in 1991.

== Notable burials ==
- Lawrence A. Conner, Sr. – Pennsylvania State Representative for Delaware County (1953–54)
