= Ivy Mills Historic District =

Historic district in Pennsylvania, United States

- U.S. National Register of Historic Places
- U.S. Historic district
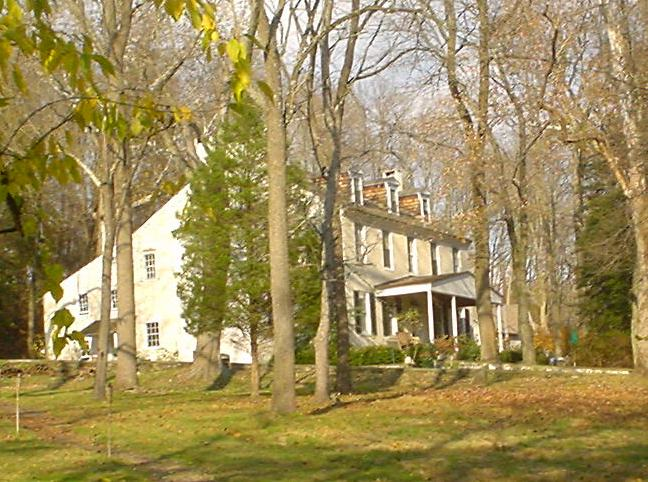
- Ivy Mills Mansion House, November 2009

- Location within Pennsylvania Location within the United States
- Location: Corner of Ivy Mills and Pole Cat Rds., Concord Township, Pennsylvania
- Coordinates: 39°53′10″N 75°29′14″W
- Area: 38.4 acres (15.5 ha)
- Built: 1829
- NRHP reference No.: 72001117
- Added to NRHP: August 21, 1972

The Ivy Mills Historic District is a national historic district located in Concord Township, Delaware County, Pennsylvania, United States. It encompasses the ruins of a paper mill (erected 1829), a clerk's house (built circa 1830), and the Ivy Mills Mansion House (built 1837). The mansion house is a 2 1/2-story, five bay wide, stuccoed masonry structure, which includes a saltbox wing and a wide verandah. The original paper mill was erected in 1729, and the original mansion house in 1744. Both of the original buildings were replaced in the early-19th century by the present buildings.

This district was added to the National Register of Historic Places in 1972.

== History ==
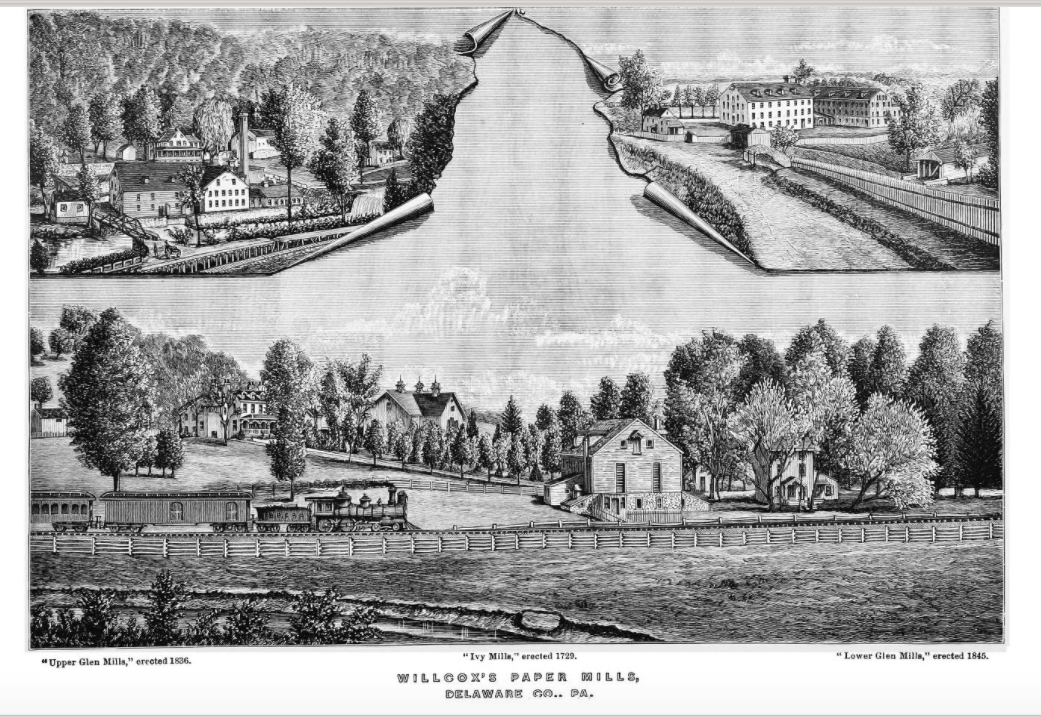
Wilcox Paper Mill sketch from Henry Ashmead's History of Delaware County, Pennsylvania, 1884

In 1726, Thomas Willcox along with Thomas Brown built a mill dam across the Chester Creek. In 1729 a paper mill was erected and the first paper was sold. The Ivy Mills is the second oldest paper mill built in America. Only the Rittenhouse mill in Philadelphia is older.

The first output from Ivy Mills was pressboard and then printing paper. Thomas Willcox was a friend of Benjamin Franklin and was known to have made paper for him. Willcox received the first order for paper used in the production of colonial and continental currency. After 1775, the mill was devoted almost entirely to making government paper for the continental bills, loan certificates and bills of exchange. At the time of the American Revolution, the government depended entirely on Ivy Mills for paper for currency. The Ivy Mills supplied paper for the Continental and United States governments as well as many South American countries. Paper was produced at Ivy Mills until 1886. The mill gradually fell into ruins.

A mission chapel was established at Ivy Mills in 1730, making it the oldest Roman Catholic parish in Pennsylvania. In 1837, St. Mary's Chapel was built as part of the new Ivy Mills Mansion. Eventually the size of the congregation was sufficient to warrant the construction of a new church in 1852 named St. Thomas the Apostle Church a mile away in what would become the borough of Chester Heights.

This district was added to the National Register of Historic Places in 1972.

== Gallery ==
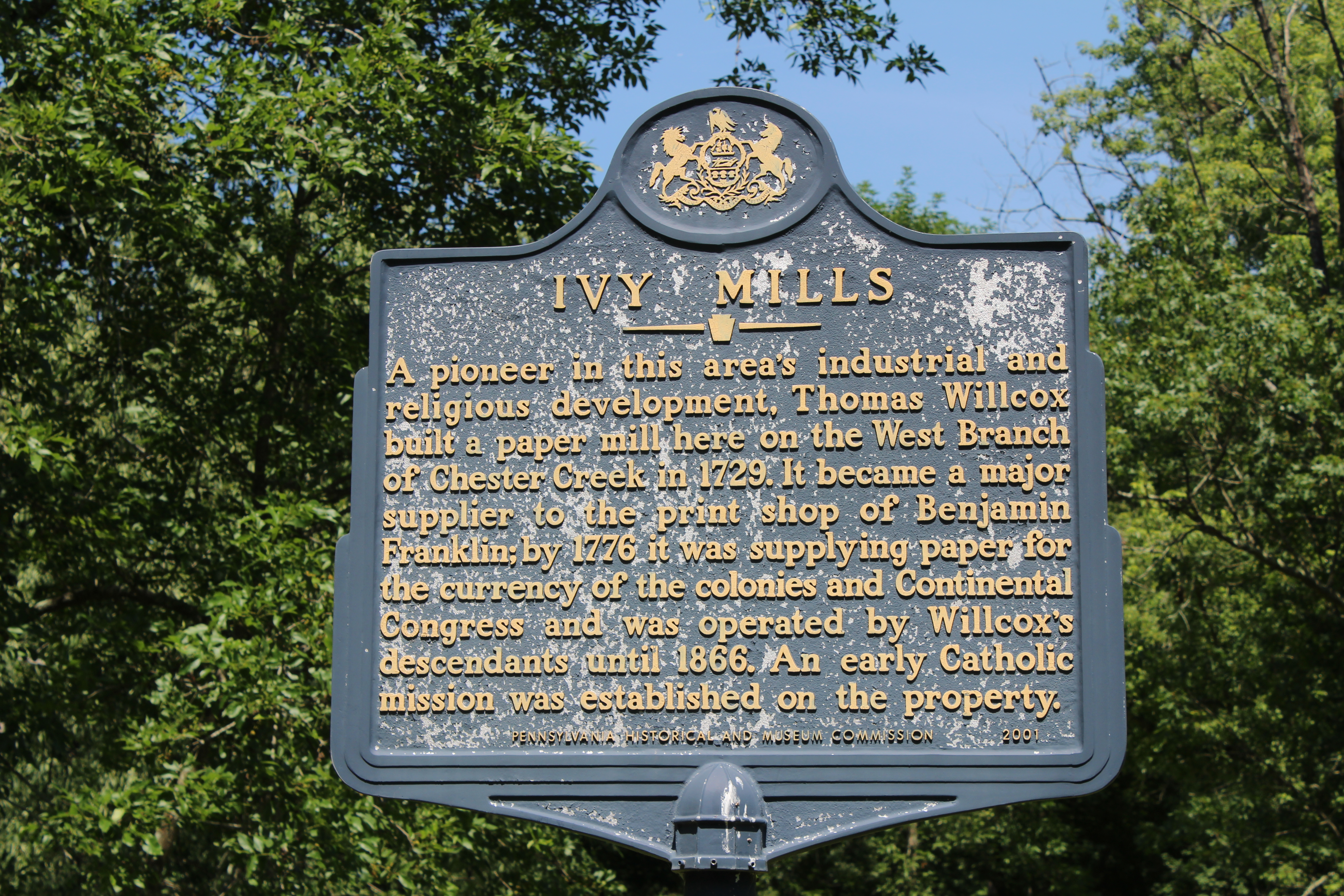
Photo taken in 2017 of PA Historical Marker in front of Ivy Mills Historic District

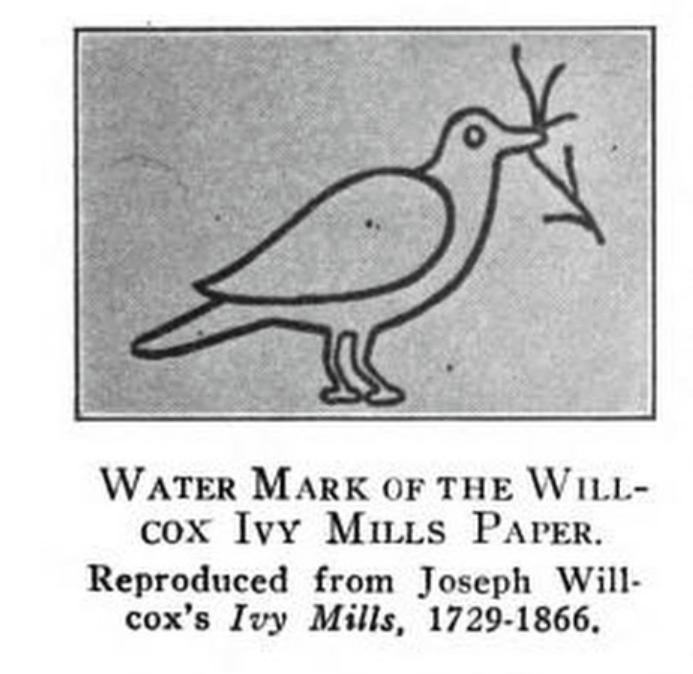
