= Ogden House (Swarthmore, Pennsylvania) =

Historic house in Pennsylvania, United States

- U.S. National Register of Historic Places
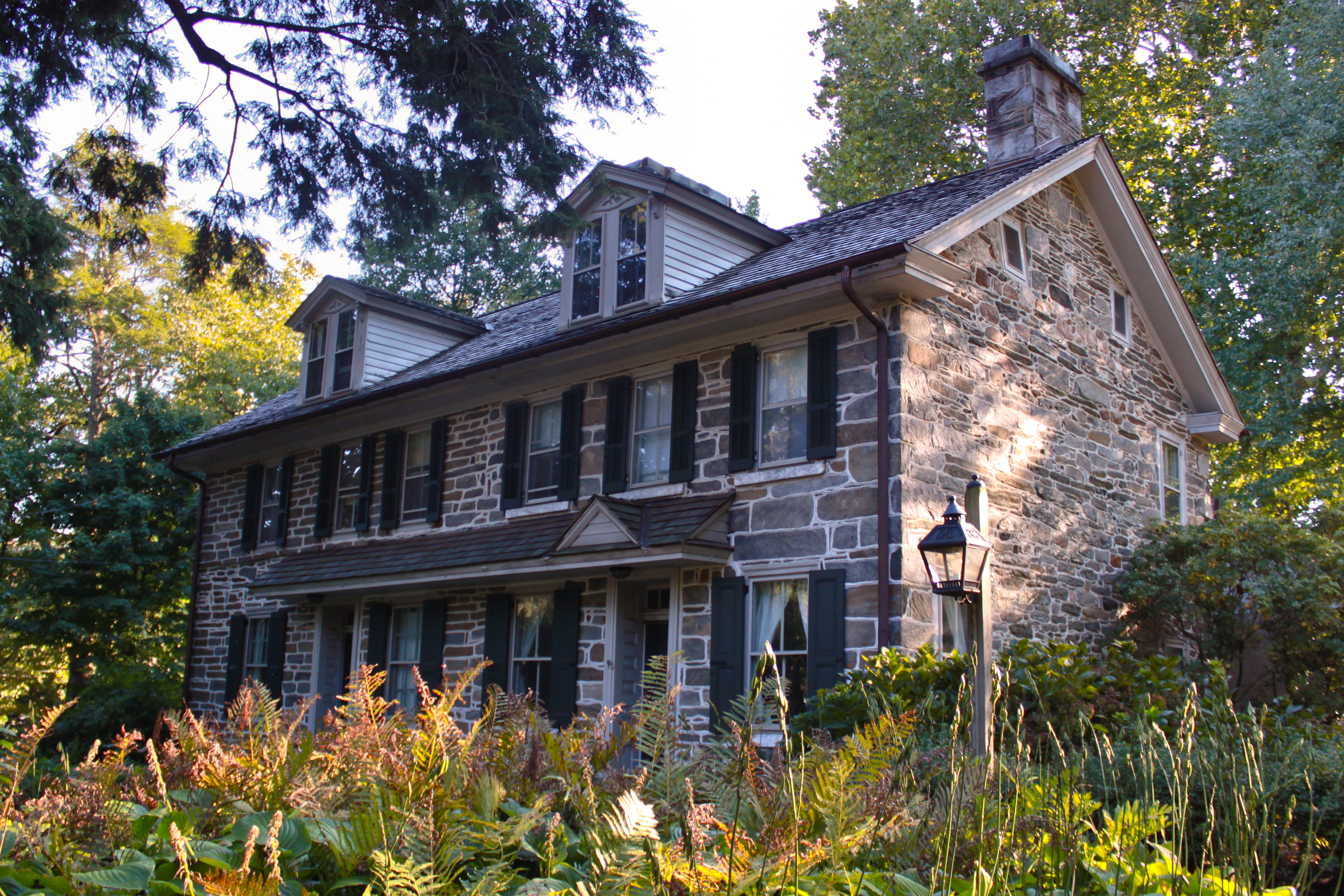
- Ogden House, September, 2012

- Location within Pennsylvania Location within the United States
- Location: 530 Cedar Lane, Swarthmore, Pennsylvania
- Coordinates: 39°54′41″N 75°21′4″W
- Area: 0.7 acres (0.28 ha)
- Built: 1736
- Built by: Maddock, John
- NRHP reference No.: 79002223
- Added to NRHP: November 20, 1979

Ogden House is a historic home located at Swarthmore, Delaware County, Pennsylvania. It was built in 1736, and is a three-story stone house faced on three sides with dressed stone and one side with rubble stone. One of the dressed stone sides is coated with stucco. It has a double pitched roof and two massive stone chimneys.

It was added to the National Register of Historic Places in 1979.
