= Handwrought =

Historic house in Pennsylvania, United States

- U.S. National Register of Historic Places
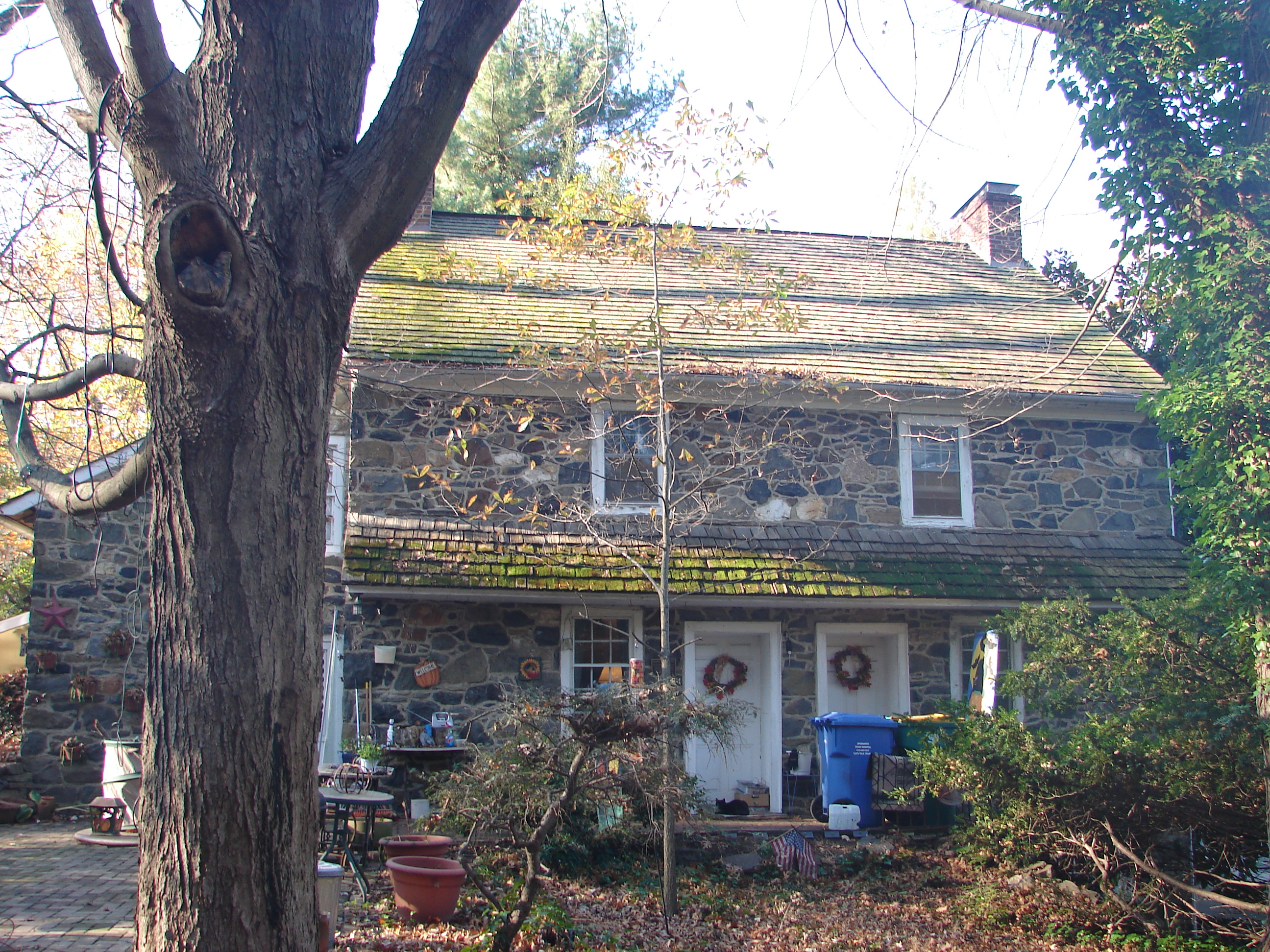
- Handwrought, November 2009

- Location within Pennsylvania Location within the United States
- Location: Concord and Station Rd., Concordville, Pennsylvania
- Coordinates: 39°52′52″N 75°30′52″W
- Area: 2 acres (0.81 ha)
- Built: 1805
- Architectural style: Bank House
- NRHP reference No.: 78002391
- Added to NRHP: January 18, 1978

Handwrought, also known as Thomas Marshall House, is a historic home located at Concordville, Delaware County, Pennsylvania. It was built in 1805, and is a two- to three-story Eastern Pennsylvania Bank House. It is built of random fieldstone and has two entrances. Heat, electronic, and water were installed in the house after 1947.

It was added to the National Register of Historic Places in 1978.
