= High Hill Farm =

- U.S. National Register of Historic Places
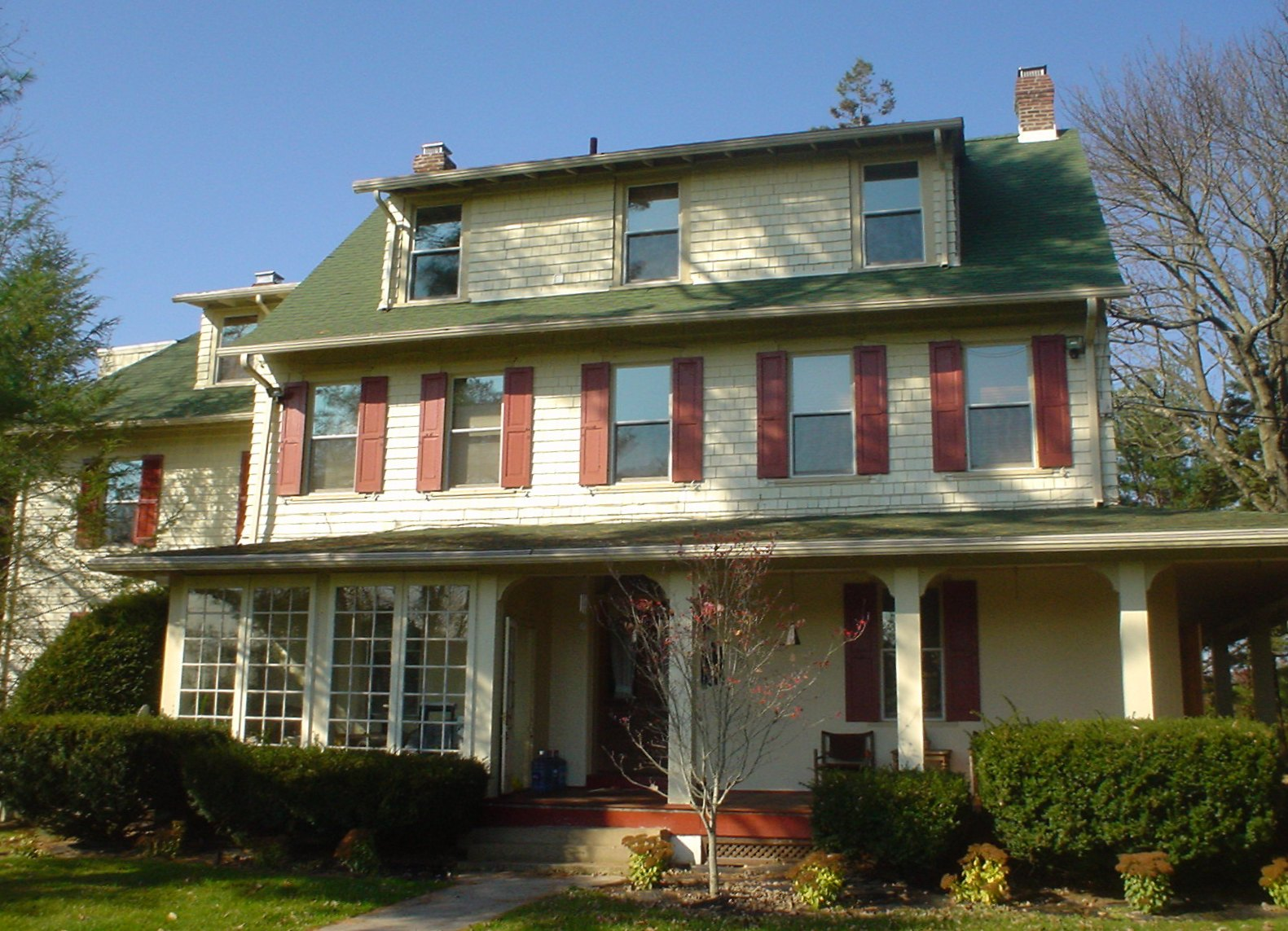
- High Hill Farm House, November 2009

- Location within Pennsylvania Location within the United States
- Location: 180 Thornton Road, Thornton, Pennsylvania
- Coordinates: 39°53′48″N 75°31′30″W
- Area: 2 acres (0.81 ha)
- Built: 1880
- Architect: Beebe, Lawrence
- NRHP reference No.: 86001784
- Added to NRHP: August 21, 1986

High Hill Farm, also known as Connemara Farm, is an historic farm complex which is located in Thornton, Delaware County, Pennsylvania.

It was added to the National Register of Historic Places in 1986 by John and Ethel Giblin.

== History and architectural features ==
The complex includes the great double barn and farmhouse, both dated principally to the early twentieth century, a carriage house and stable, dated to the 1880s, a creamery, and various sheds. The great double barn is a T-shaped, bank barn wood building, which features a pair of great sliding doors on the uphill side. It is the largest remaining barn in Delaware County. The farmhouse is a 2 1/2-story, modified center hall, Georgian-style house, which features a broad shed roof dormer.
