= Brandywine Summit Camp Meeting =

Historic district in Pennsylvania, United States

- U.S. National Register of Historic Places
- U.S. Historic district
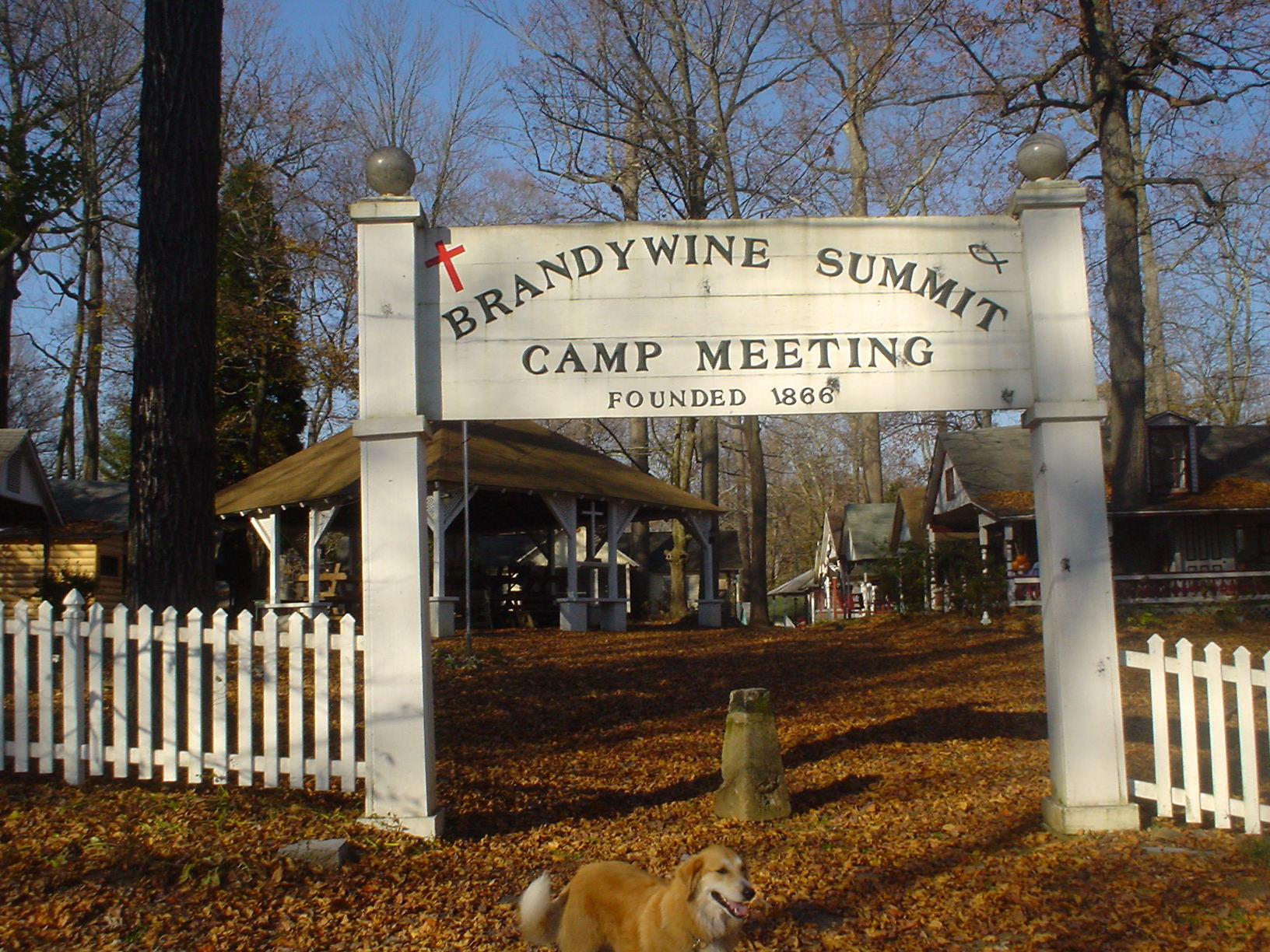
- Brandywine Summit Camp Meeting entrance, November 2009

- Location within Pennsylvania Location within the United States
- Location: 119 Beaver Valley Rd., Chadds Ford, Concord Township, Pennsylvania
- Coordinates: 39°51′04″N 75°32′50″W
- Area: 13 acres (5.3 ha)
- Built: c. 1884
- Built by: Wise, John; et al.
- NRHP reference No.: 95000132
- Added to NRHP: February 24, 1995

Brandywine Summit Camp Meeting is a historic camp meeting and national historic district located at Concord Township, Delaware County, Pennsylvania, United States. The rural setting drew Methodists from nearby Wilmington, Delaware and West Chester. The district includes 76 contributing buildings near Chadds Ford village. The buildings are in a vernacular camp meeting style of architecture. The centerpiece of the community are the Tabernacle, built about 1884, and Pavilion, also dated to the 1880s. Most of the contributing buildings are cottages, built after the turn of the 20th century.

It was added to the National Register of Historic Places in 1995.
