= New Century Club =

New Century Club, and variations, may refer to:

in the United States

(by state then city)

- New Century Club (Milford, Delaware), now the Delaware Children's Theatre, a historic women's clubhouse listed on the National Register of Historic Places (NRHP) in Kent County
- New Century Club (Wilmington, Delaware), a historic women's clubhouse on the NRHP
- New Century Club (Philadelphia, Pennsylvania)
- New Century Club (Utica, New York), a historic women's clubhouse on the NRHP
- New Century Clubhouse (West Chester, Pennsylvania), listed on the NRHP

== See also ==
- Century Club (disambiguation)
- New Century Guild, Philadelphia, Pennsylvania
- Twentieth Century Club (disambiguation)
