= Twentieth Century Club =

Twentieth Century Club may refer to:

- Twentieth Century Club (Buffalo, New York), listed on the National Register of Historic Places, the first club run by women, for women, in the United States
- Twentieth Century Club of Lansdowne in Pennsylvania, listed on the National Register of Historic Places
- 20th Century Club (Reno, Nevada) listed on the National Register of Historic Places in Washoe County, Nevada
- Twentieth Century Club (Pittsburgh) at the University of Pittsburgh, a contributing property to the Schenley Farms National Historic District

== See also ==
- Century Club (disambiguation)
- New Century Club (disambiguation)
