= Alexandra Pierce =

American composer and musician (1934–2021)

- Born: February 21, 1934; Philadelphia, Pennsylvania, U.S.
- Died: February 1, 2021 (aged 86)
- Education: University of Michigan (BM); New England Conservatory (MM); Harvard University (MA); Brandeis University (PhD)
- Occupations: Composer; pianist; music theorist; movement educator; author; professor
- Employers: University of Redlands; MIT; Antioch College

Alexandra Pierce (February 21, 1934 – February 1, 2021) was an American composer, pianist, music theorist, movement educator, author, and Emerita Research Professor of Music and Movement at the University of Redlands.

== Early life and education ==
Born and raised in Philadelphia, her family later moved to Washington, D.C., where she studied piano with contemporary music specialist, Margaret Tolson. She received a Bachelor of Music, Phi Beta Kappa (1955), from the University of Michigan, where she majored in piano performance and medieval history; a Master of Music in piano performance from the New England Conservatory of Music (1958); a Master of Arts in music history from Harvard University (1959); and a Ph.D. in music theory and composition from Brandeis University (1968), where her teachers included composers Irving Fine and Harold Shapero. Her dissertation, written at Brandeis, is entitled The Analysis of Rhythm in Tonal Music.

== Career ==
Pierce taught from 1968 to 2001 at the University of Redlands, where she was Professor of Music and Movement, and where she integrated movement research with the teaching of music theory, piano, and with her own composing. Prior to her arrival in Redlands, she taught at MIT and Antioch College.

Her book, Deepening Musical Performance through Movement: The Theory and Practice of Embodied Interpretation (Indiana University Press), was published in 2007. She and Roger Pierce have co-authored two books on enhancing human movement: Expressive Movement: Posture and Action in Daily Life, Sports, and the Performing Arts (Da Capo Press, 1989) and Generous Movement (Center of Balance Press, 1991).

Her music is published by Subito Music (formerly by Seesaw Music), as well as by Sisra Publications, Media Press, and Hildegard Music. Some of her scores are held in the Fleisher Collection at the Free Library of Philadelphia. The tone poem Behemoth (1976) has been recorded by the Lansdowne Symphony Orchestra, conducted by Reuben Blundell. Her Symphony No. 2, Dances on the Face of the Deep, completed in 1988 was recorded by the Koszalin State Philharmonic Orchestra conducted by Szymon Kawalla on the Vienna Modern Masters label.

== Death ==
Pierce died on February 1, 2021, at the age of 86.

== Selected works ==
=== Orchestral ===
- Behemoth, in five short movements (1976)
- Dances on the Face of the Deep, Symphony No. 2 (1988)
- Short Suite Overture (1995)

=== String quartets ===
- Outcrops and Upshots, String Quartet No. 2 (1994)
- Four Movements for String Quartet (1987) (rev. 1996)

=== Winds ===
==== Flute ====
- Dark Zephyrs, flute and piano (2007)
- Tributaries, flute and piano (1999)
- Escaped Exotics, solo flute (1985)
- A Common Chase, flute and marimba (1980)

==== Clarinet ====
- 7 Line Drawings, solo B-flat clarinet (nos. 6 and 7 are for B-flat bass clarinet) (1993)
- After Dubuffet's 'Limbour as a Crustacean,' B-flat clarinet and percussion (one player: snare, 3 tom-toms, marimba) (1979)
- Job 22:28, for two B-flat clarinets (1978)
- Buffalo Bill, for B-flat clarinet, friend (piano and spoken poetry), and tape (poem by e e cummings) (1978)
- Three Pieces for B-flat Clarinet and Piano (1977)
- Sargasso
- Norwich Chorale
- Arabesque

==== Oboe, English horn, alto saxophone ====
- Song and Dance, oboe and piano (1997)
- Suite for English Horn and Piano (1996, rev 2000), arr. for Alto Saxophone and Piano (1999)
- Set of Three, oboe and piano (1995)
- Calliope Dances, oboe and piano (1991)

==== French horn, tuba, mixed chamber winds ====
- Bible Bestiary, tuba and speaker (Sparrow & Cockroach, poems by Roger Pierce) (1997)
- Dialogues for Horn and Cello (1996)
- Never No Summer, Two Movements for Five Winds, flute, oboe, clarinet, bass clarinet, trombone (1985)

=== Percussion ===
- Moretti Music, vibraphone (1995)
- Traces in Movement, violin, piano, and percussion (one player: I. tenor drum and snare; wood block; II. triangles, tambourine; III. Snare, temple blocks, xylophone (1993)
- Calypso of Ogygie, marimba (1990)
- After Dubuffet's 'Limbour as a Crustacean,' B-flat clarinet and percussion (one player: snare, 3 tom-toms, marimba) (1979)
- Fool's Gold, vibraphone (1978)
- The Great Horned Owl, 4-1/2 octave marimba (kelon) (1977)

=== Piano ===
- Capriccio and Rhapsody (2003)
- Intimations, Suite for Piano (2001)
- Rings of Saturn (2000)
- Upslope, Suite for Piano (1998)
- Keener's Way (1997)
- Four Done Deals (1994)
- The Spirits That Lend Strength Are Invisible (1990)
- Mixed Nocturne & Toccata (1989)
- Heart of the Beast (1988)
- Ballad and Ostinato (1985)
- The Lost River, Sevier (1978)
- Transverse Process (1976)

=== Piano, four hands ===
- Sweeney among the Nightingales and Danse Micawber (1975)

=== Prepared piano ===
- Seven Waltzes for Emily Dickinson (1980)
- Popo Agie (1979)
- Six Sentient Waltzes (1979)
- Variations 7 (1978)
- Dry Rot (1977)
- Blending Stumps (1976)
- Orb (1976)
- Spectres (with five easy eraser preparations) (1975)
- Greycastle (1974)

=== Strings (guitar, harp, violin, violoncello) ===
==== Guitar ====
- Serenade (1979)

==== Harp ====
- Caryatid II (1991)
- Caryatid I (1990)
- Maola (1977)

==== Violin ====
- Set of Six, three movements for violin and percussion (one player: timpani, marimba, xylophone), three for violin solo (1994)
- Traces in Movement, percussion (wood, metal, wood), violin, and piano (1993)

==== Violin and viola ====
- A Red, Red Rose, duo for violin and viola on a poem of Robert Burns (2008)
- My Luv (2010)

==== Cello ====
- Landforms, three movements for solo cello (2004)
- Dialogues for Horn and Cello (1996)
- Cambodian Dancer, cello and piano (1983)

=== Voice, solo ===
- Bible Bestiary: Sparrow & Cockroach, speaker and tuba (poems by Roger Pierce) (1997, arr. for speaker and piano in 2001)
- Psalm 100, soprano and piano (King James trans., also for low voice and piano) (1993)
- Three Songs on Poems by Christina Rossetti and Emily Dickinson, high voice and piano; low voice and harp (1993)
- Barbr'y Allen, low voice and piano; freely based on the traditional text and tune (1992)
- Seven Settings of Poems by William Blake, from Songs of Experience and Songs of Innocence), unaccompanied voice (1990)
- Spring and Fall: To a Young Child, low voice and piano (poem by Gerard Manley Hopkins) (1985)

== Books ==
=== Books by Alexandra Pierce ===
- Deepening Musical Performance through Movement: the Theory and Practice of Embodied Interpretation (Indiana University Press, 2009) ISBN 9780253349330 According to WorldCat, the book is held in 373 libraries
- Spanning: Essays on Music Theory, Performance and Movement (Center of Balance Press, 1983)

=== Books by Alexandra Pierce and Roger Pierce ===
- Expressive Movement: Posture and Action in Daily Life, Sports and the Performing Arts (Perseus Books, NY, 1989)> According to WorldCat, the book is held in 2823 libraries
- Generous Movement, a Practical Guide to Balance in Action (Center of Balance Press, 1991) ISBN 978-1879970007
