= Lansdowne Folk Club =

US non-profit organization

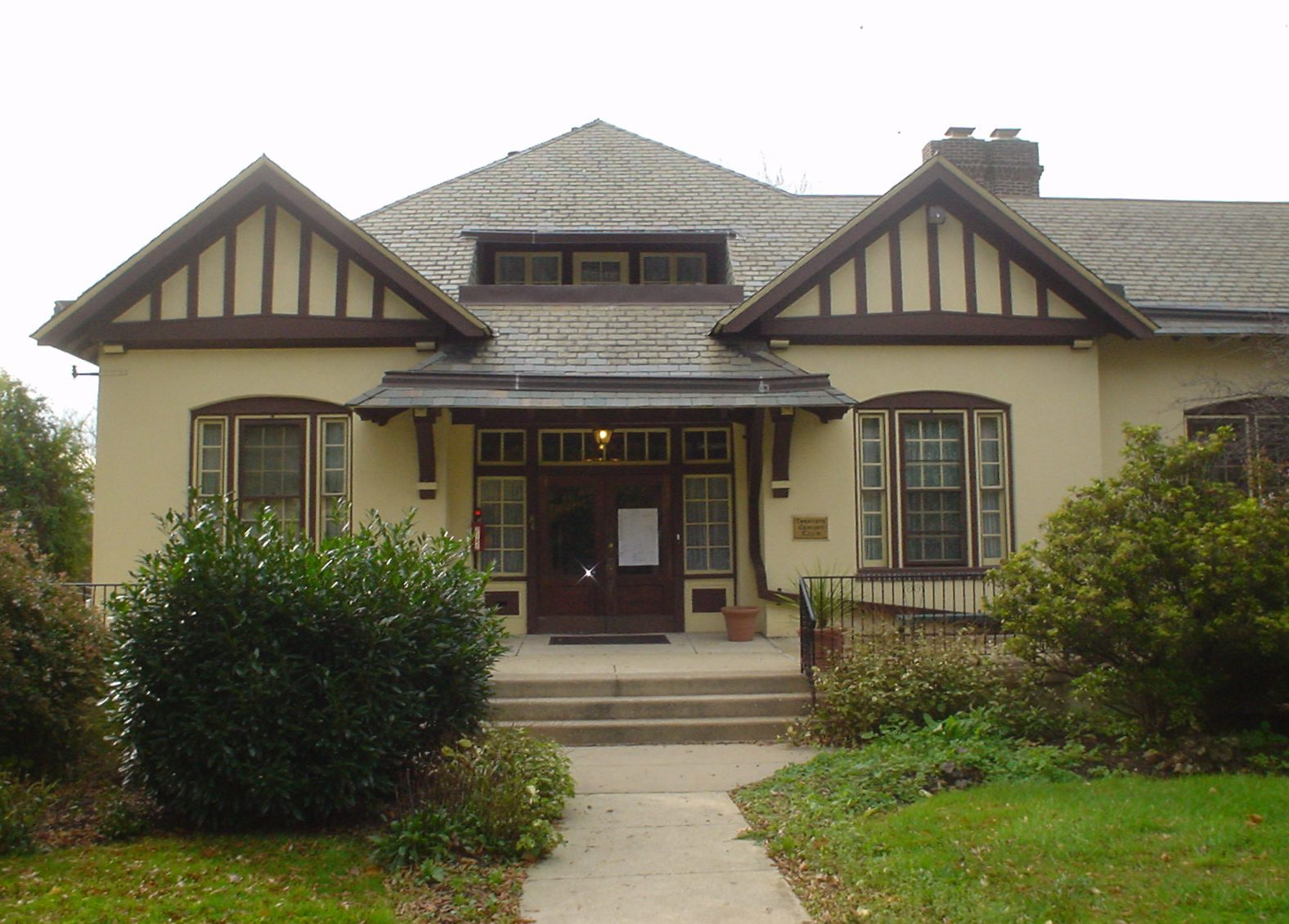
- The Twentieth Century Club
- Formation: 1992
- Legal status: Nonprofit
- Purpose: Hosting folk music concerts featuring local and national artists
- Headquarters: Lansdowne, Pennsylvania
- Official language: English
- Website: www.folkclub.org

The Lansdowne Folk Club is a volunteer non-profit 501(c)(3) folk club dedicated to presenting, promoting, and preserving folk, acoustic, and blues music in the Philadelphia area. It was founded in 1992.

== History ==
The Lansdowne Folk Club was founded in 1992 and staged its first concert in 1993. The concerts take place in a venue named with the Twentieth Century Club, which is on the National Register of Historic Places. Many of the acts are local musicians and the average attendance is around 70. The venue has hosted over forty different concerts with acts such as Dave Van Ronk and Susan Warner. The club is mostly supported with ticket sales and sponsorships from local business and organizations. The club is known for featuring a diverse selection of artists including a Brazilian music duo, mandolin players, and the Lansdowne Symphony Orchestra.
