= Henry Albertson Subdivision Historic District =

Historic district in Pennsylvania, United States

- U.S. National Register of Historic Places
- U.S. Historic district
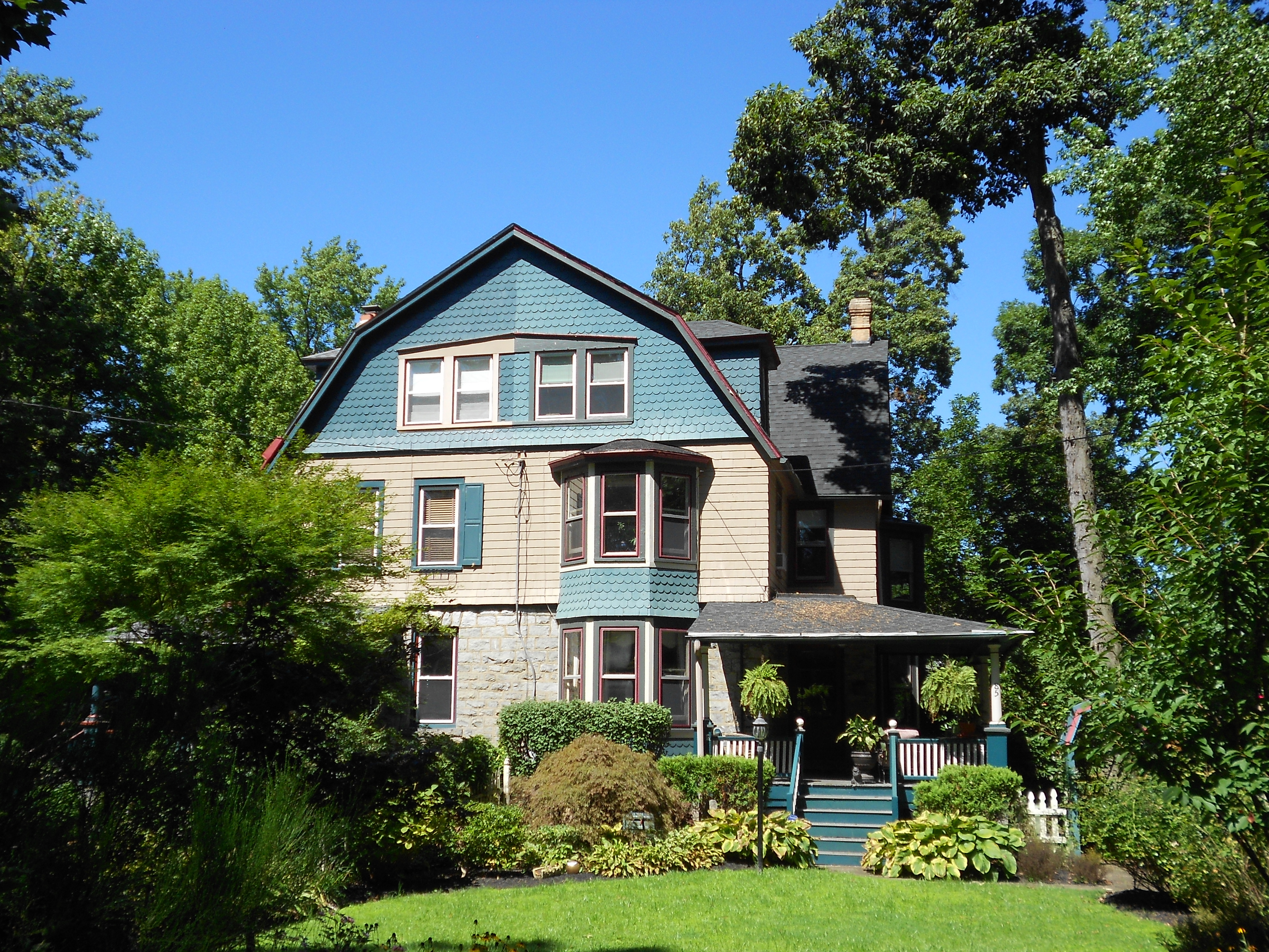
- House on Greenwood, 2013

- Location within Pennsylvania Location within the United States
- Location: Roughly bounded by N. Lansdowne, Clover, Wycombe, Price, and Stewart Aves., and Balfour Cir., Lansdowne, Pennsylvania
- Coordinates: 39°56′34″N 75°16′21″W
- Area: 24 acres (9.7 ha)
- Architect: Bunting & Shrigley; Heacock, Joseph Linden
- Architectural style: Colonial Revival, Tudor Revival, Queen Anne
- NRHP reference No.: 98000044
- Added to NRHP: January 30, 1998

The Henry Albertson Subdivision Historic District, also known as the Henry Albertson Plan and Henry Albertson Property, is an historic subdivision and national historic district which is located in Lansdowne, Delaware County, Pennsylvania.

It was added to the National Register of Historic Places in 1998.

== History and architectural features ==
The district includes seventy contributing buildings which are located in a residential area of Lansdowne, Pennsylvania. The subdivision consists of single and double houses, which were built between 1884 and roughly 1940, and were designed in a variety of popular architectural styles.

This historic district includes notable examples of the Colonial Revival, Tudor Revival, and Queen Anne styles, which are characterized by first stories made from stone, wood frame upper stories, and wooden porches.

== Gallery ==
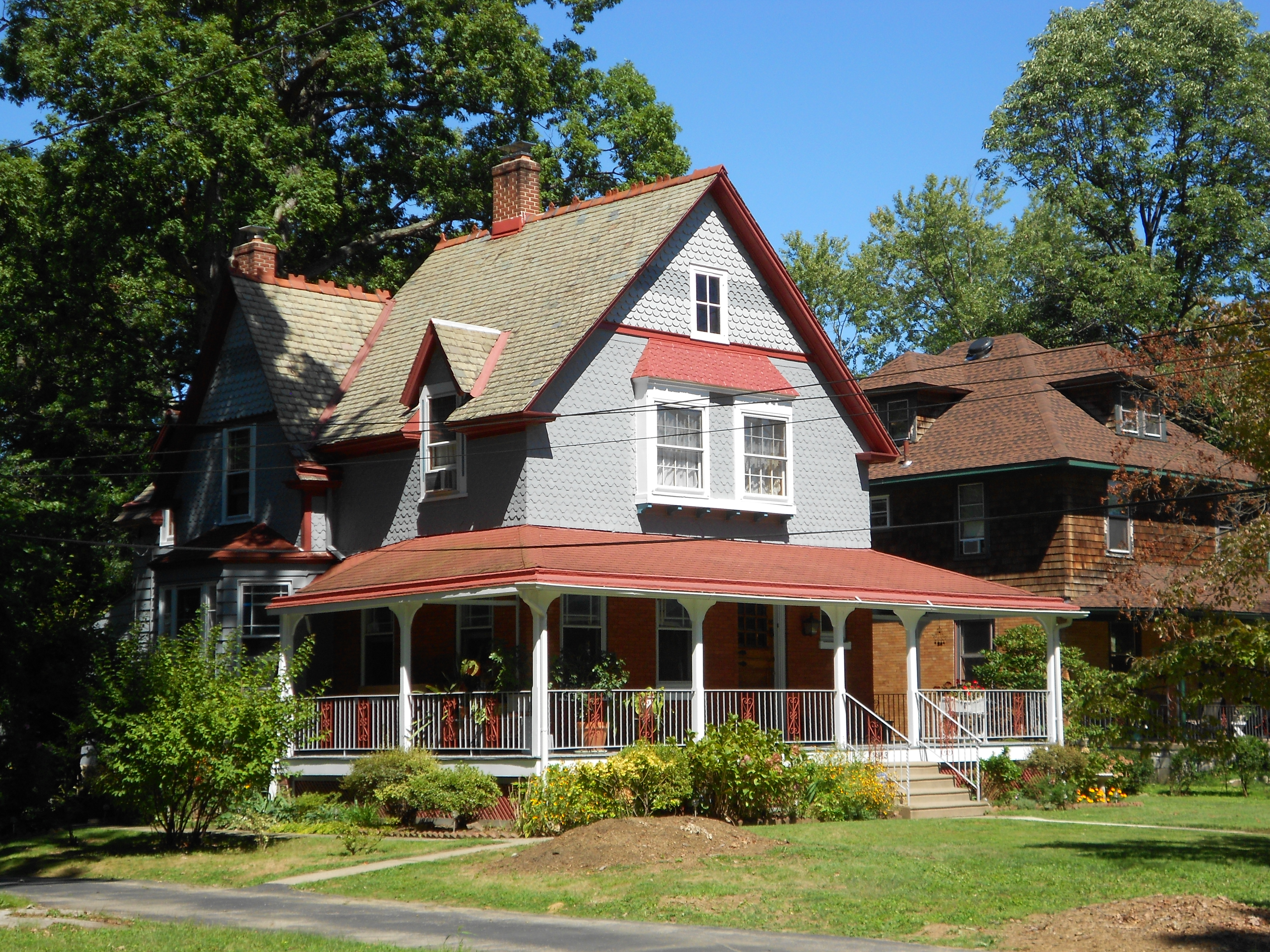
House on Greenwood, 2013.

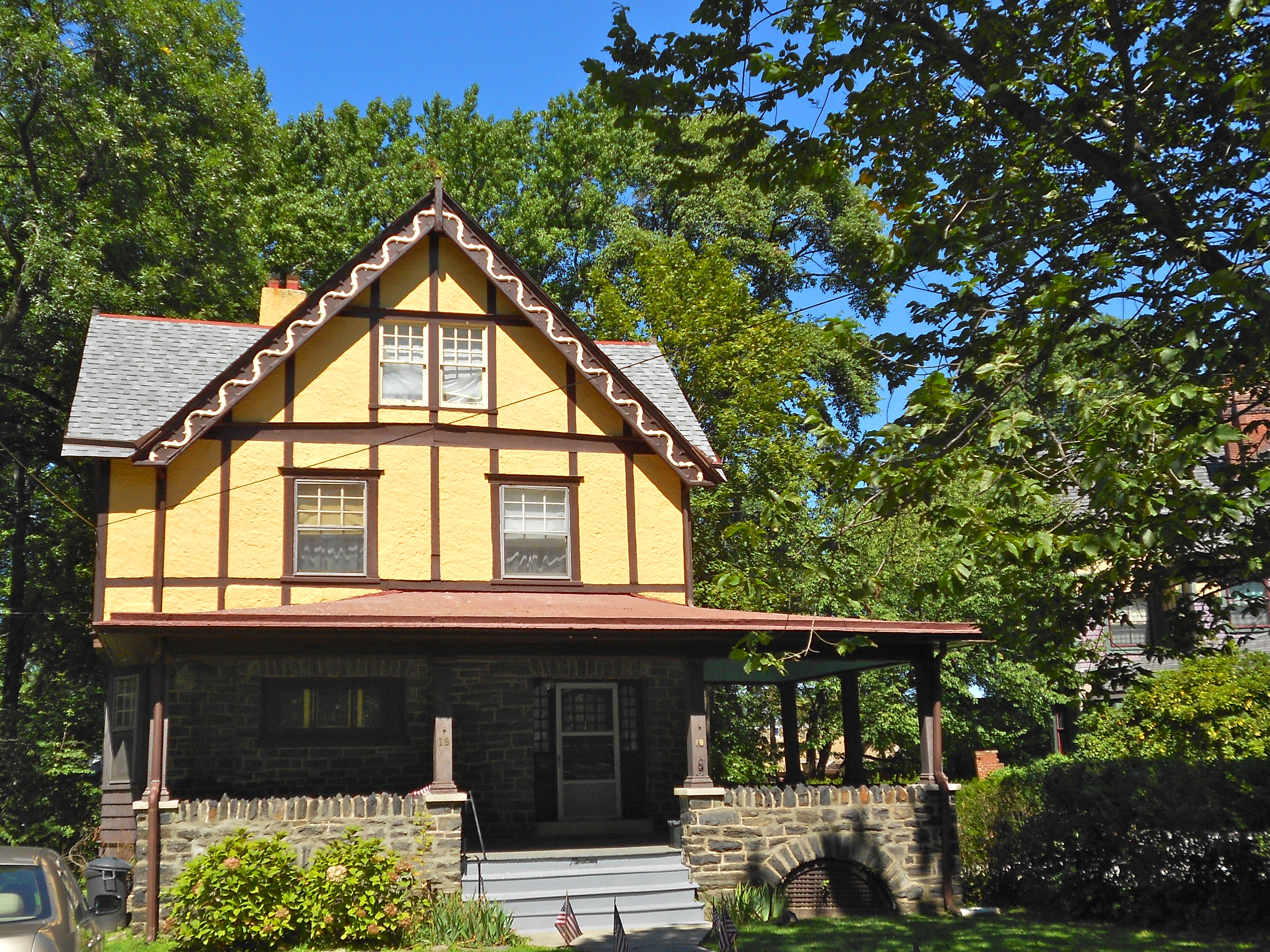
House on Greenwood, 2013.

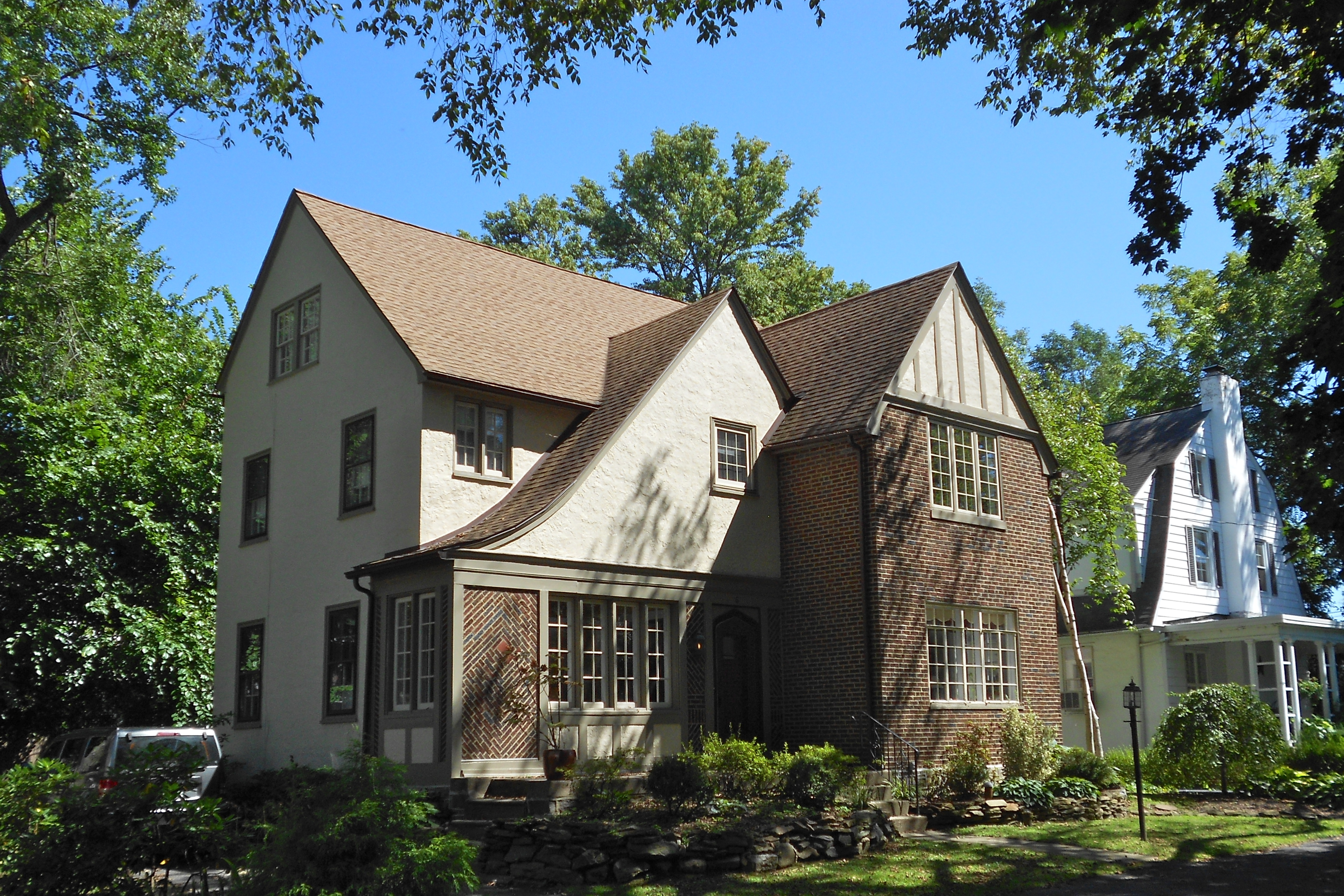
House on Balfour, 2013.

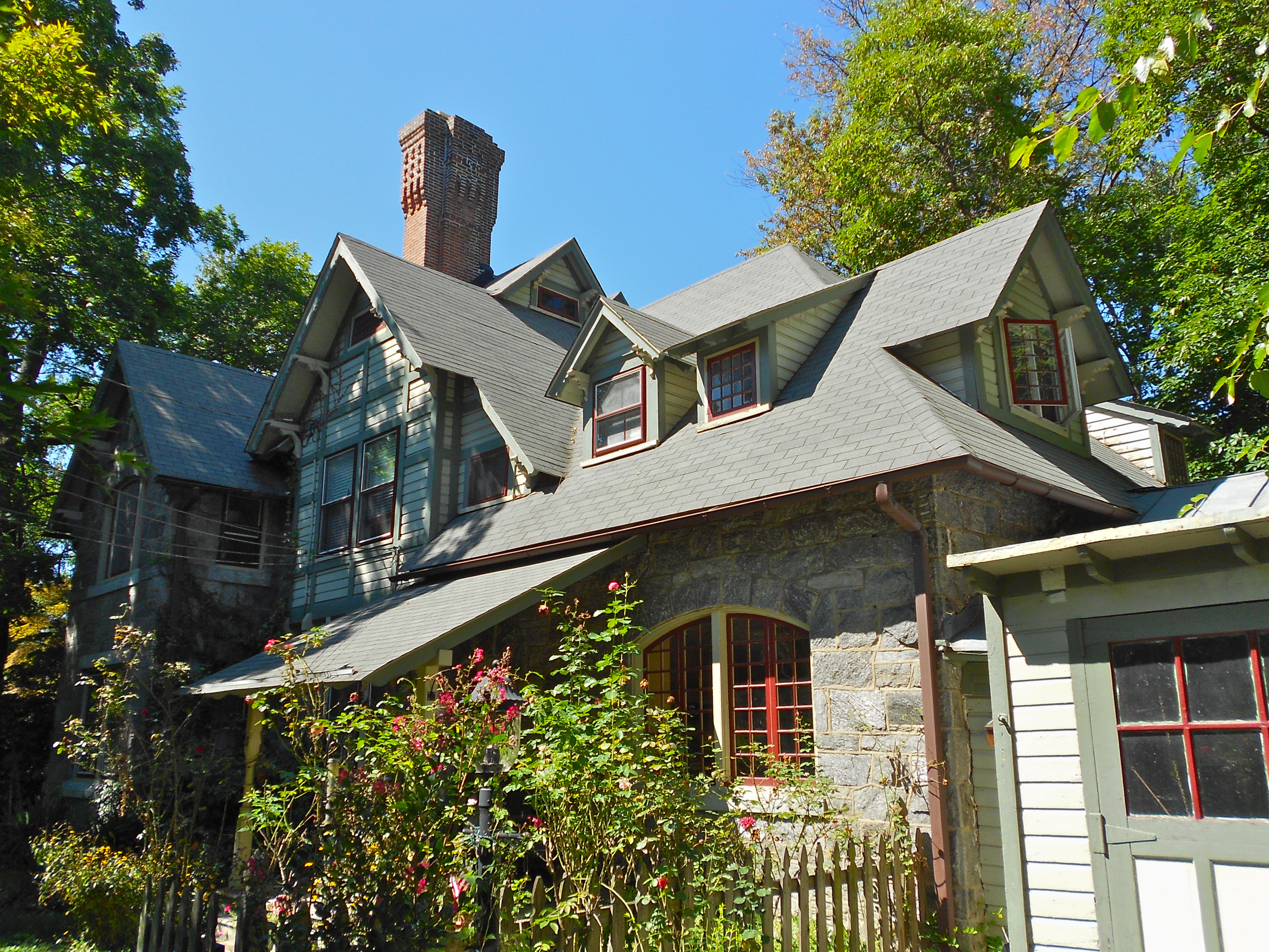
House on Balfour, 2013.

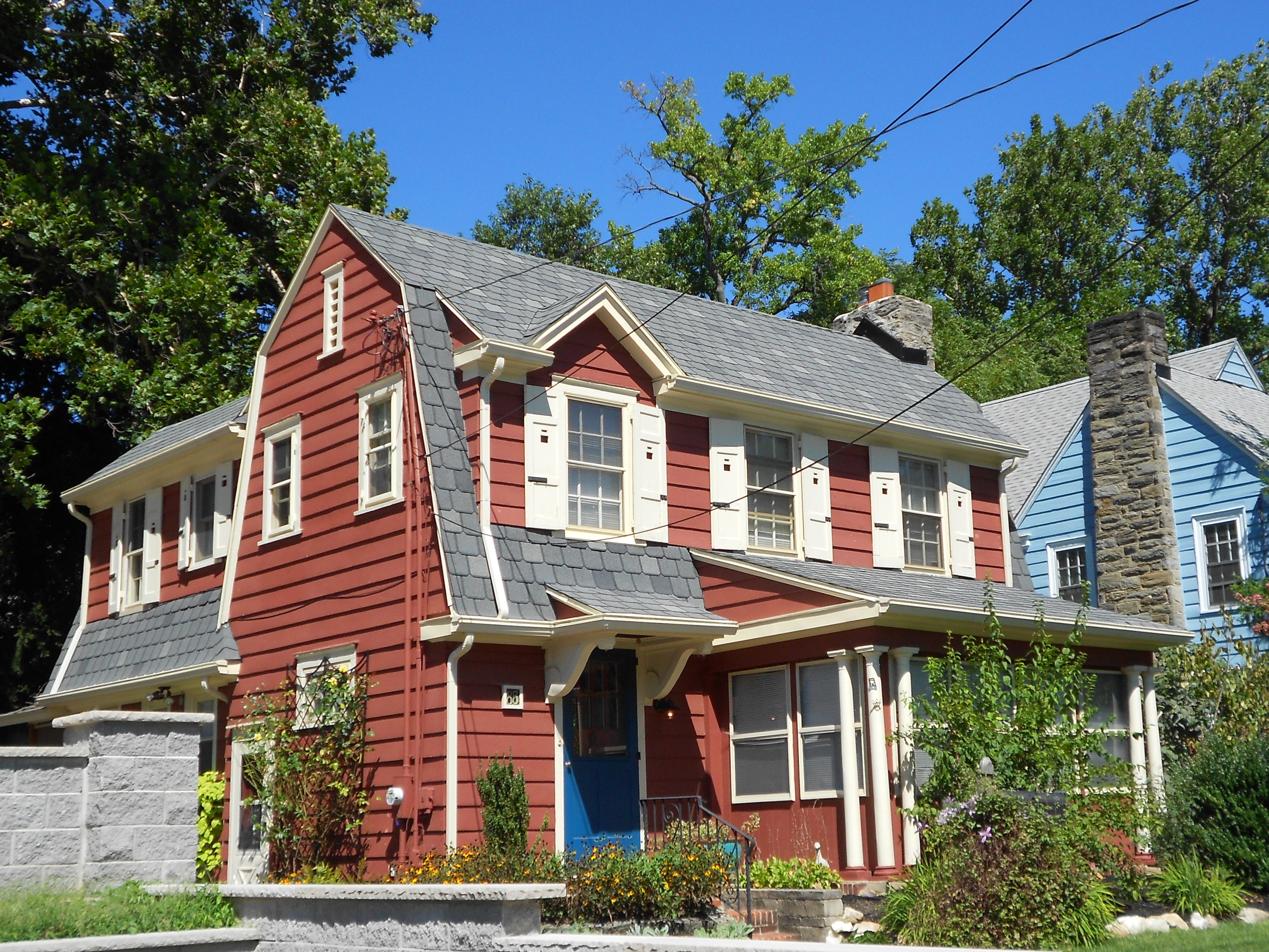
House on Stewart, 2013.

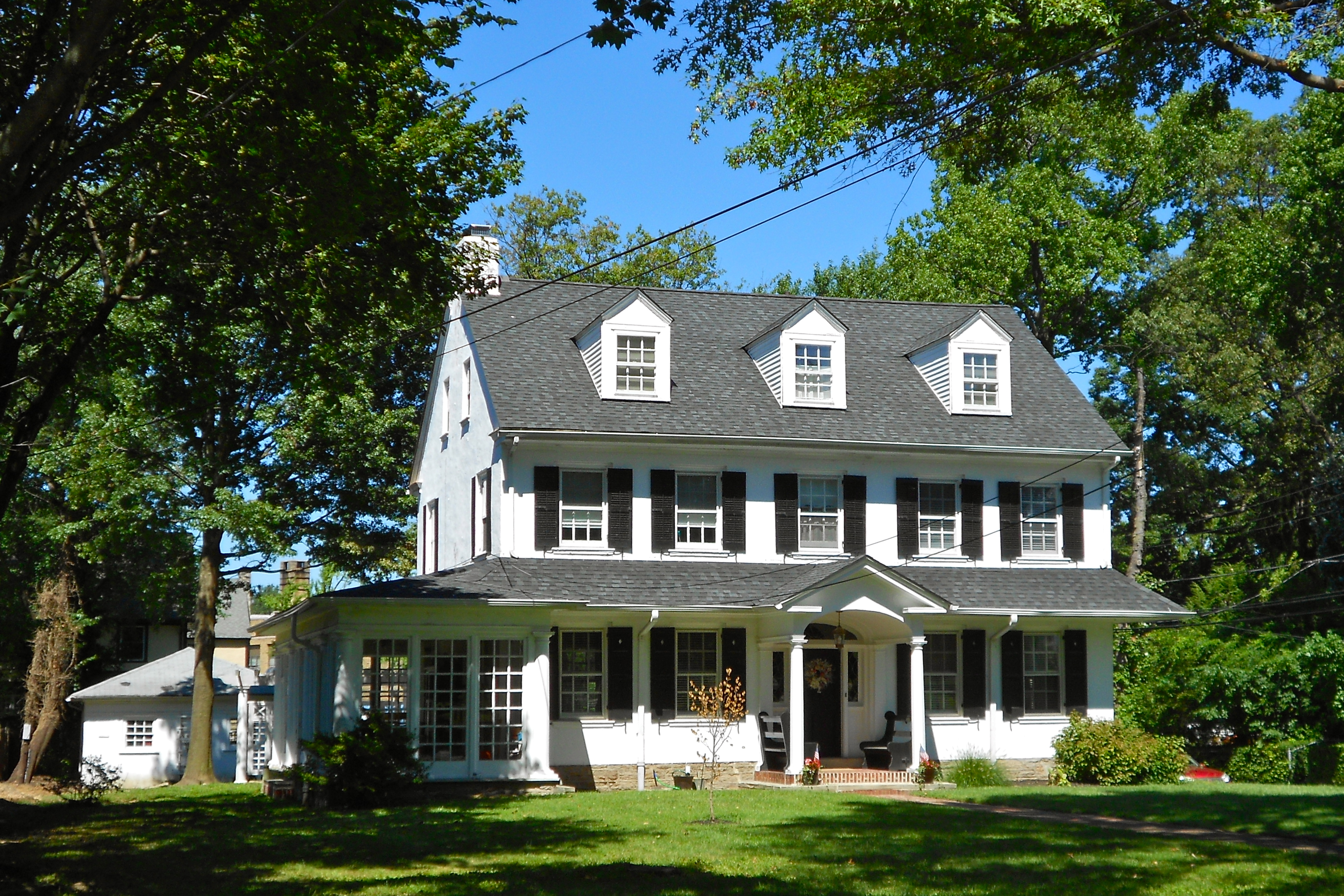
House on Highland, 2013.
