= Minerva Parker Nichols =

American architect

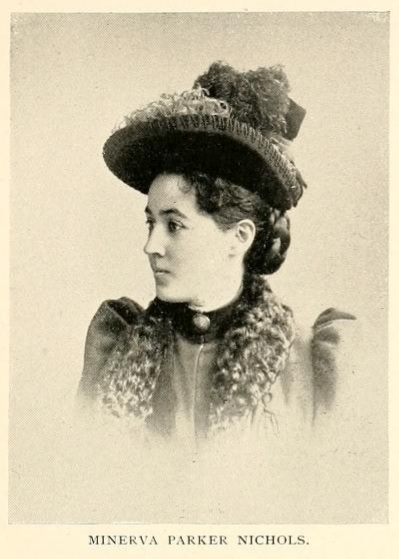
Nichols, c.1897

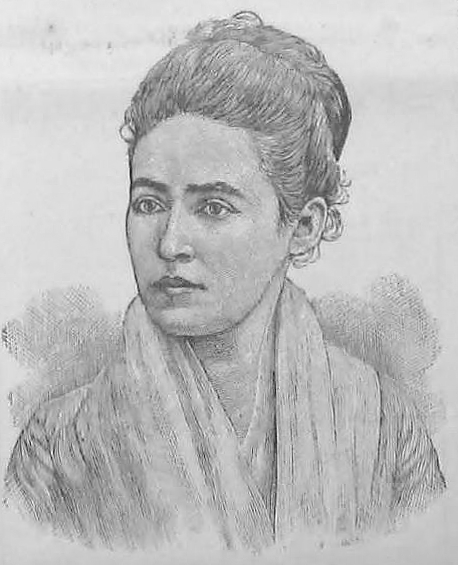
Drawing of Minerva Parker Nichols, 1890

Minerva Parker Nichols (May 14, 1863 – 1949) was an architect from the United States who in 1889 became the first woman to operate an independent architectural practice in the United States. She designed at least eighty known buildings, which included homes, schools, churches, and clubhouses.

== Early years and education ==
Minerva Parker was born May 14, 1863, in Chicago, Illinois. She was a descendant of John Doane who landed in Plymouth, in 1630, and took an active part in the government of the colony. Seth A. Doane, the grandfather of Nichols was an architect and went to Chicago when it was an outpost and trading settlement among the Native Americans. Her father, John W. Doane, died in Murfreesborough, Tennessee, during the Civil War, being a member of an Illinois Volunteer Regiment.

She studied at the Philadelphia Normal Art School, and studied modeling under John J. Boyle.

== Career ==
Nichols entered an architect's office as draftsman. She joined the architectural firm of Frederick G. Thorn in Philadelphia. She took control of the firm after Thorn's death in 1888 and held the position for seven years. In 1896, she and her husband left the Philadelphia area and she began a private practice mostly for friends and relatives.

Nichols was the second (after Louise Blanchard Bethune) American female architect who established a very successful, although brief, business and recognition, and the first one who did so without partnership or assistance of a man.

Later, she built the Woman's New Century Club, in Philadelphia. Besides her practical work in designing houses, she delivered in the School of Design, in Philadelphia, a course of lectures on Historic Ornament and Classic Architecture. Among some of her important commissions was one for the designing of the International Club House, known as the Queen Isabella Pavilion, at the World's Columbian Exposition, Chicago, in 1893. She was among the first women to enter the field of architecture and some of the homes in the suburbs of Philadelphia attest to her ability and talent in this line. In December, 1899, she married Rev. William J. Nichols, a Unitarian clergyman. Having earlier miscarried twins, she gave birth to her first child in 1894, a daughter named Adelaide. Her second daughter, Caroline, was born in 1897. Her third child, John, was born in 1899, and her youngest child, William Jr., was born in 1905.

== Notable buildings ==
- New Century Club (Philadelphia)
- New Century Club (Wilmington, Delaware)
- Buckingham Browne & Nichols school, Cambridge, Massachusetts (1894)
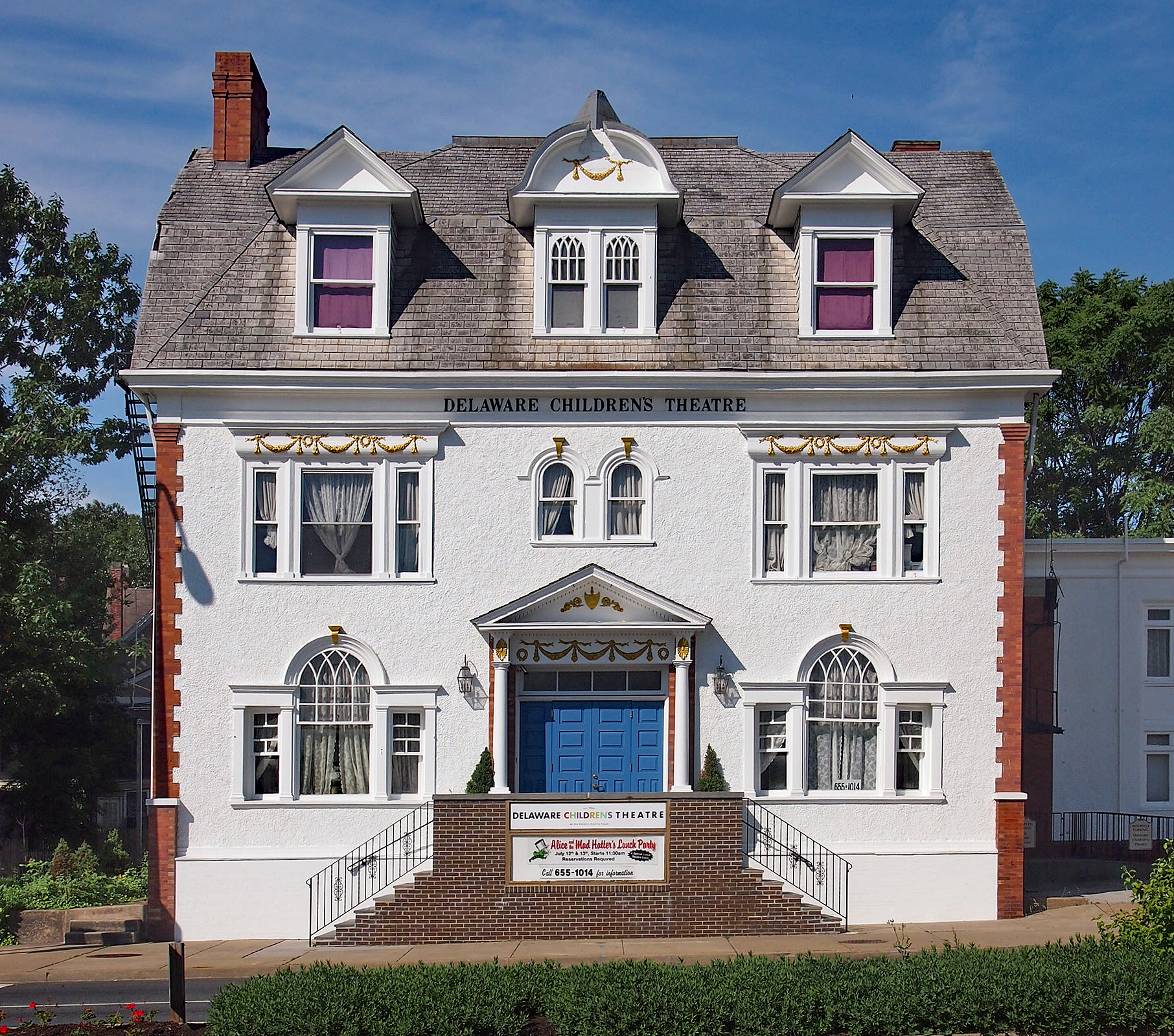
New Century Club, Wilmington

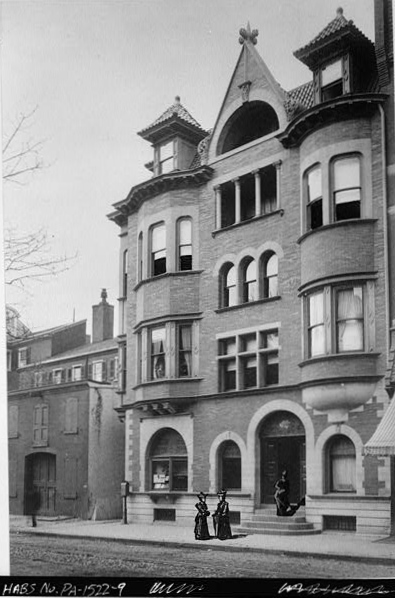
New Century Club, Philadelphia

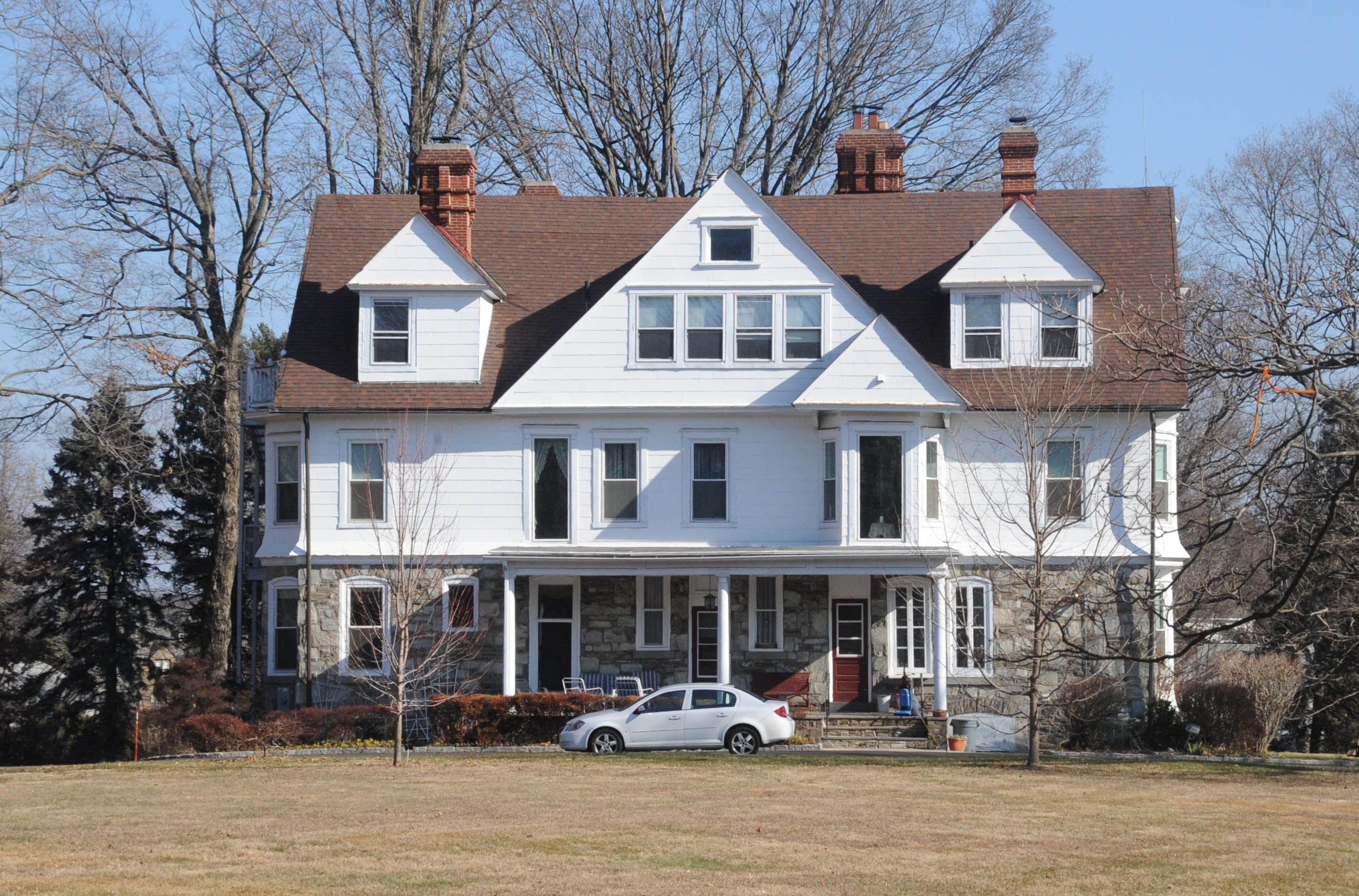
Mill-Rae, Philadelphia
