= Lansdowne, Pennsylvania =

Borough in Pennsylvania, US

- Borough
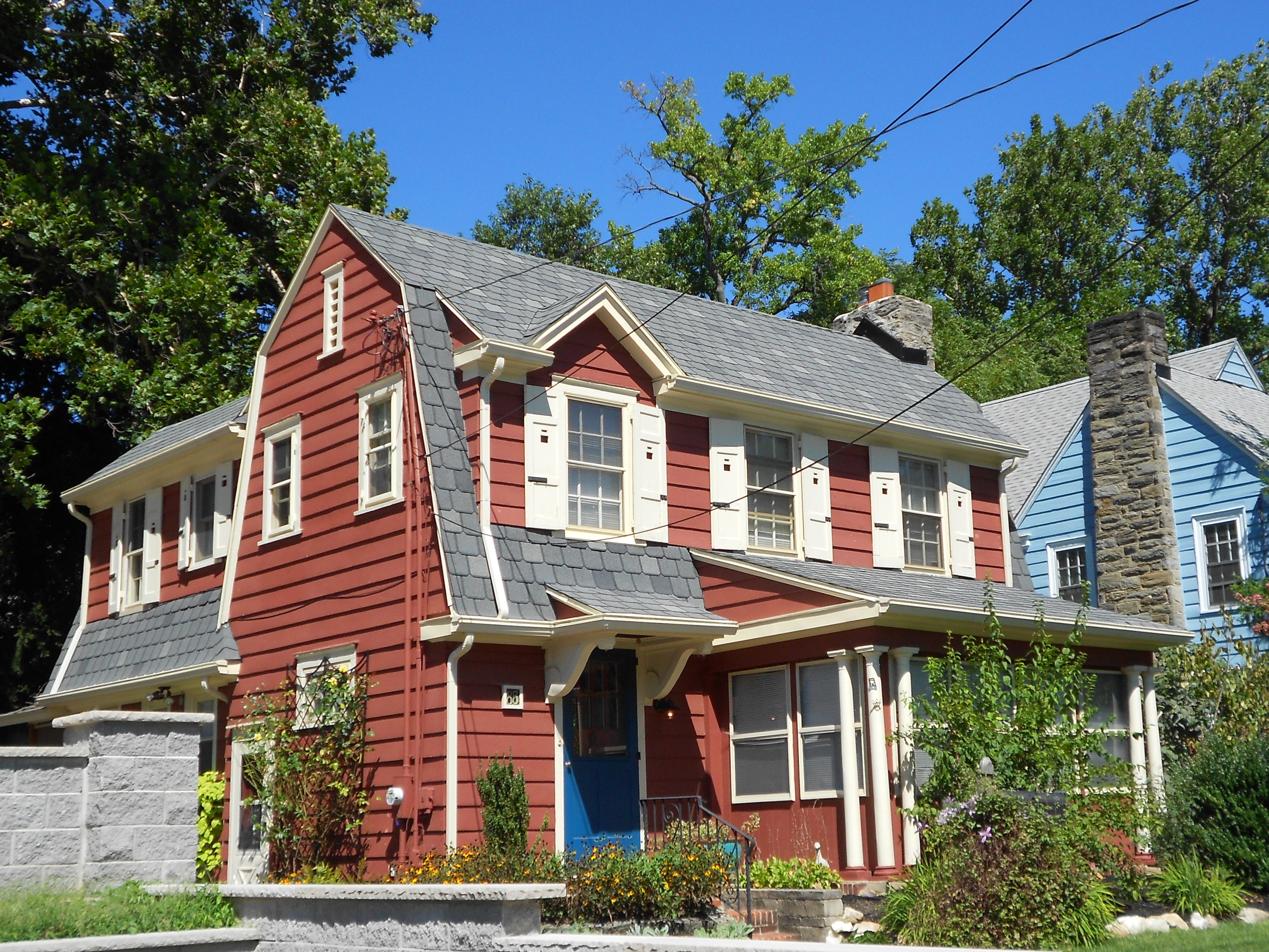
- House on Stewart Avenue, 2013

- Flag Logo
- Motto: Discover Lansdowne
- Location in Delaware County and the U.S. state of Pennsylvania.

- Location of Lansdowne in Pennsylvania Lansdowne (the United States)
- Coordinates: 39°56′29″N 75°16′31″W
- Country: United States
- State: Pennsylvania
- County: Delaware

Government
  - Type: Borough
  - Body: Borough Council
  - Mayor: Magda Byrne

Area
  - Total: 1.18 sq mi (3.06 km^{2})
  - Land: 1.18 sq mi (3.06 km^{2})
  - Water: 0 sq mi (0.00 km^{2})
- Elevation: 108 ft (33 m)

Population (2020)
  - Total: 11,107
  - Density: 9,401.6/sq mi (3,629.96/km^{2})
- Time zone: UTC-5 (EST)
  - Summer (DST): UTC-4 (EDT)
- ZIP Code: 19050
- Area codes: 610, 484, and 835
- FIPS code: 42-41440
- GNIS feature ID: 1178879
- Website: www.lansdowneborough.com

Lansdowne is a borough in Delaware County, Pennsylvania, United States, located 6 miles (10 km) southwest of Center City Philadelphia. It was named for the Marquess of Lansdowne. As of the 2020 census, Lansdowne had a population of 11,107.

Lansdowne grew quickly in the early part of the twentieth century, when a railroad stop was established near the intersection of Lansdowne Avenue and Baltimore Pike. The borough is primarily residential, with a commercial center near the original railroad stop. The borough also contained some light industrial buildings, which have been in decline in recent decades.

The borough is sometimes erroneously spelled "Landsdowne" or confused with Lansdale, in nearby Montgomery County.

== Geography ==
Lansdowne is located in eastern Delaware County at 39°56′29″N 75°16′31″W (39.941345, -75.275343). It is bordered to the southeast by Yeadon, to the southwest by Clifton Heights, and to the north, east, west, and south by Upper Darby Township. Drexel Hill, a part of Upper Darby Township, borders Lansdowne to the northwest, and the borough of East Lansdowne is just 0.1 miles (0.16 km) east of the Lansdowne border.

According to the United States Census Bureau, the borough has a total area of 1.2 square miles (3.1 km^{2}), all land. Darby Creek, a tributary of the Delaware River, forms the southwestern and southern borders of the borough.

== Demographics ==
Historical population
| Census | Pop. | Note | %± |
|---|---|---|---|
| 1890 | 875 | | — |
| 1900 | 2,630 | | 200.6% |
| 1910 | 4,066 | | 54.6% |
| 1920 | 4,797 | | 18.0% |
| 1930 | 9,023 | | 88.1% |
| 1940 | 10,837 | | 20.1% |
| 1950 | 12,169 | | 12.3% |
| 1960 | 12,601 | | 3.6% |
| 1970 | 14,090 | | 11.8% |
| 1980 | 11,891 | | −15.6% |
| 1990 | 11,712 | | −1.5% |
| 2000 | 11,044 | | −5.7% |
| 2010 | 10,620 | | −3.8% |
| 2020 | 11,107 | | 4.6% |

=== Racial and ethnic composition ===
Lansdowne borough, Pennsylvania – Racial and ethnic composition Note: the US Census treats Hispanic/Latino as an ethnic category. This table excludes Latinos from the racial categories and assigns them to a separate category. Hispanics/Latinos may be of any race.
| Race / Ethnicity (NH = Non-Hispanic) | Pop 2000 | Pop 2010 | Pop 2020 | % 2000 | % 2010 | 2020 |
|---|---|---|---|---|---|---|
| White alone (NH) | 8,236 | 4,848 | 3,614 | 74.57% | 45.65% | 32.54% |
| Black or African American alone (NH) | 2,063 | 4,670 | 5,909 | 18.68% | 43.97% | 53.20% |
| Native American or Alaska Native alone (NH) | 9 | 19 | 32 | 0.08% | 0.18% | 0.29% |
| Asian alone (NH) | 313 | 375 | 401 | 2.83% | 3.53% | 3.61% |
| Pacific Islander alone (NH) | 0 | 1 | 0 | 0.00% | 0.01% | 0.00% |
| Some Other Race alone (NH) | 22 | 18 | 95 | 0.20% | 0.17% | 0.86% |
| Mixed Race or Multi-Racial (NH) | 238 | 336 | 472 | 2.16% | 3.16% | 4.25% |
| Hispanic or Latino (any race) | 163 | 353 | 584 | 1.48% | 3.32% | 5.26% |
| Total | 11,044 | 10,620 | 11,107 | 100.00% | 100.00% | 100.00% |

=== 2020 census ===
As of the 2020 census, Lansdowne had a population of 11,107. The median age was 41.1 years. 20.4% of residents were under the age of 18 and 16.7% of residents were 65 years of age or older. For every 100 females there were 86.6 males, and for every 100 females age 18 and over there were 83.4 males age 18 and over.

100.0% of residents lived in urban areas, while 0.0% lived in rural areas.

There were 4,732 households in Lansdowne, of which 26.7% had children under the age of 18 living in them. Of all households, 35.0% were married-couple households, 19.9% were households with a male householder and no spouse or partner present, and 37.4% were households with a female householder and no spouse or partner present. About 34.5% of all households were made up of individuals and 13.2% had someone living alone who was 65 years of age or older.

There were 5,030 housing units, of which 5.9% were vacant. The homeowner vacancy rate was 1.3% and the rental vacancy rate was 5.3%.

=== 2010 census ===
As of the 2010 census, there were 10,620 people, 4,589 households, and 2,667 families residing in the borough. The population density was 8,990.2 inhabitants per square mile (3,471.1/km^{2}). There were 4,975 housing units at an average density of 4,211.5 per square mile (1,626.1/km^{2}). The racial makeup of the borough was 47.1% White, 44.6% African American, 0.2% Native American, 3.6% Asian, 0.01% Pacific Islander, 0.7% some other race, and 3.8% from two or more races. Hispanic or Latino of any race were 3.3% of the population.

There were 4,589 households, out of which 28.1% had children under the age of 18 living with them, 38.4% were husband–wife families, 15.2% had a woman householder with no husband present, and 41.9% were non-families. 34.8% of all households were made up of people living alone, and 10.9% were someone living alone who was 65 years of age or older. The average household size was 2.31, and the average family size was 3.04.

In the borough 21.4% of the population were under the age of 18, 8.2% were from 18 to 24, 28.2% were from 25 to 44, 30.0% were from 45 to 64, and 12.4% were 65 years of age or older. The median age was 39.7 years. For every 100 women there were 86.1 males. For every 100 women age 18 and over, there were 82.3 males.

=== Income and poverty ===
For the period 2010–14, the estimated median annual income for a household in the borough was $56,020, and the median income for a family was $74,656. Male full-time workers had a median income of $51,534 versus $50,276 for women. The per capita income for the borough was $31,158. About 10.1% of families and 10.4% of the population were below the poverty line, including 11.4% of those under age 18 and 14.2% of those age 65 or over.

== Education ==
=== Primary and secondary schools ===
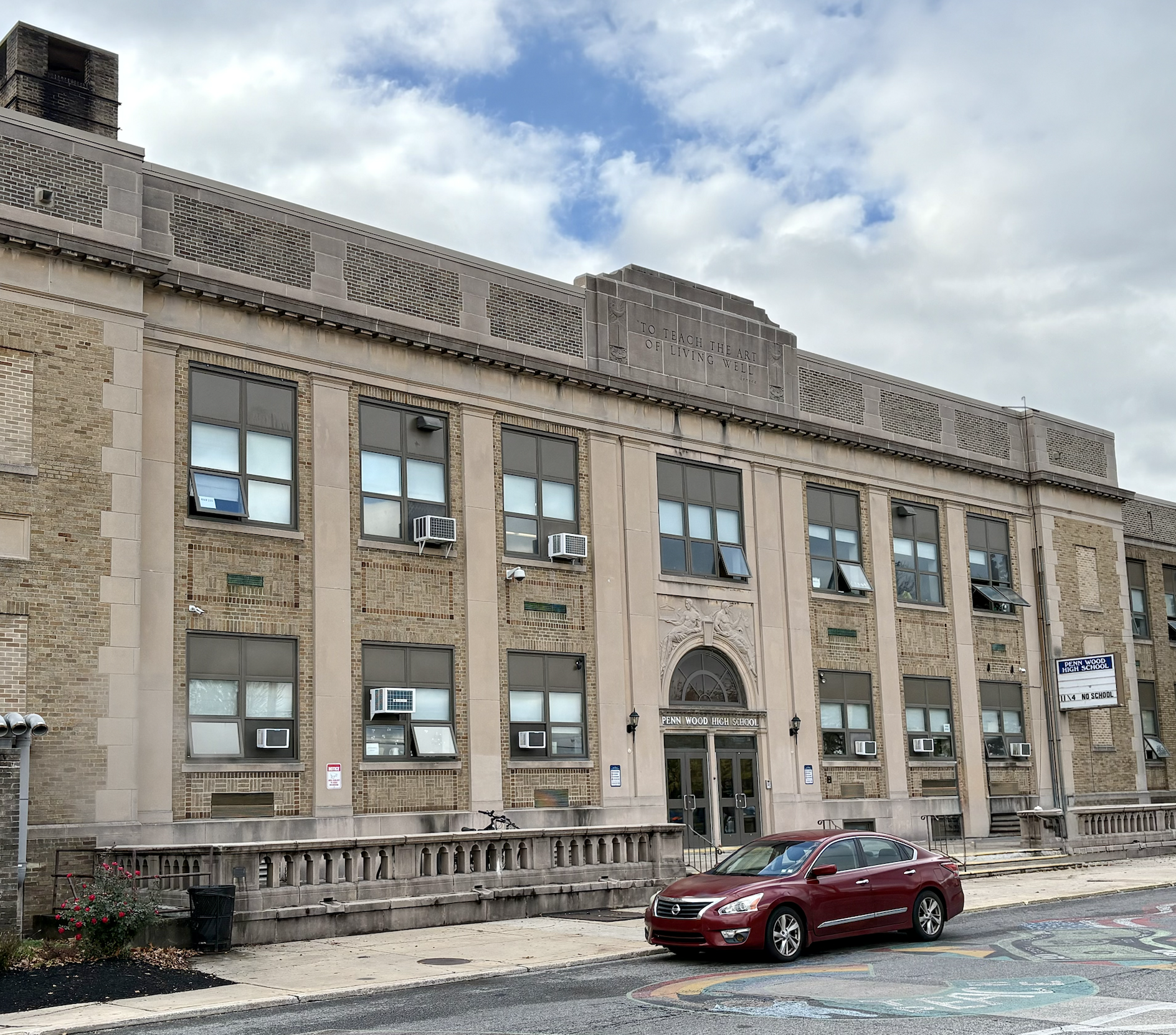
Penn Wood High School

==== Public schools ====
The William Penn School District serves Lansdowne. The district was created in 1972; prior to that year, Lansdowne was part of the defunct Lansdowne-Aldan School District. Two of the William Penn School District's schools, Ardmore Avenue Elementary School and Penn Wood High School are located in Lansdowne.

==== Private schools ====
Lansdowne Friends School is a Quaker elementary school located in Lansdowne.

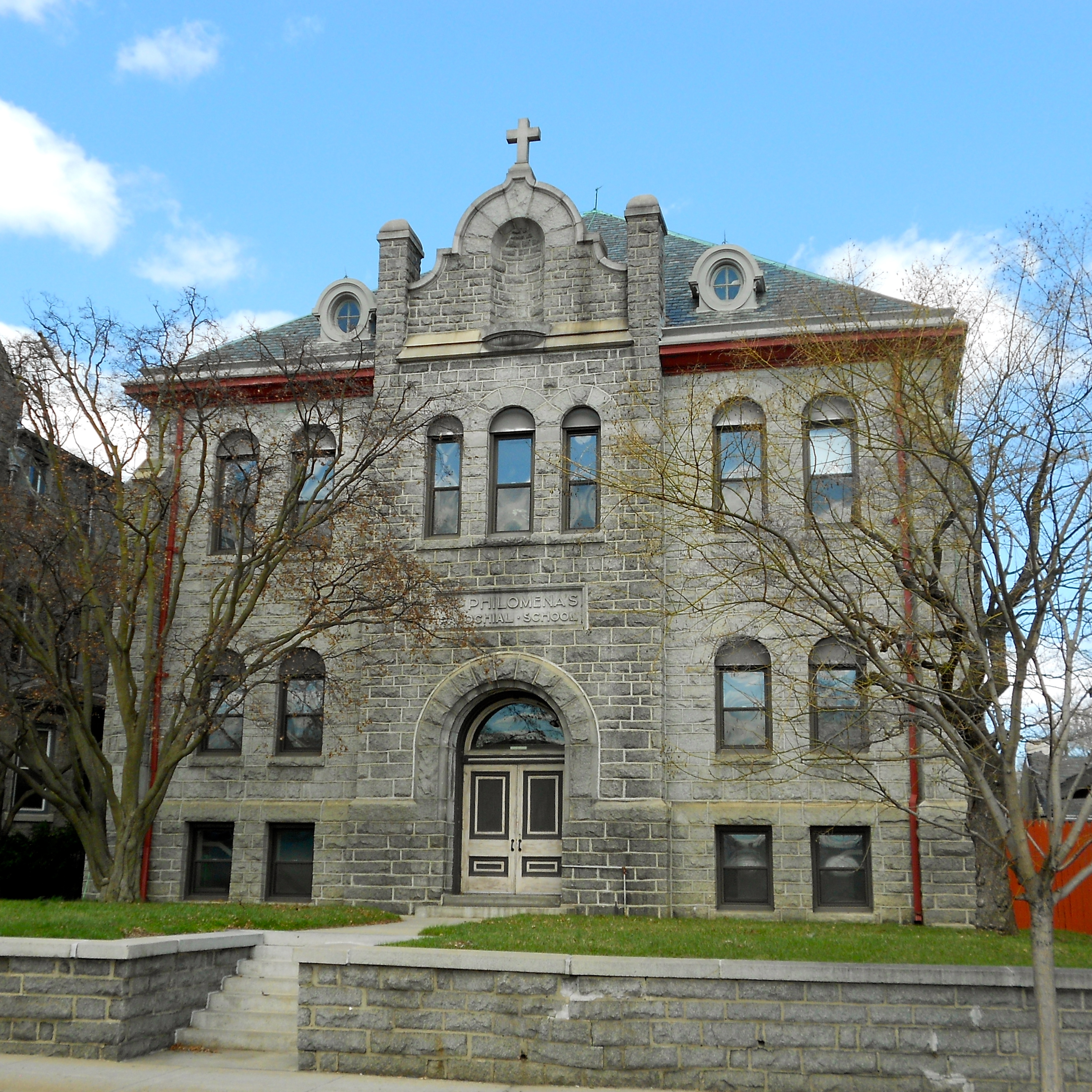
St. Philomena School

Saint Philomena School of the Roman Catholic Archdiocese of Philadelphia closed in 2011 due to low enrollment. In the 2010–2011 school year it had 141 students. It had 88 would-be students for the 2011–2012 school year that did not arrive. The Delco Times stated that had the school remained open, it would have had to reduce enrichment services. There would have been four students in the second grade, and three other classes each would have had fewer than 10 students.

== Features ==
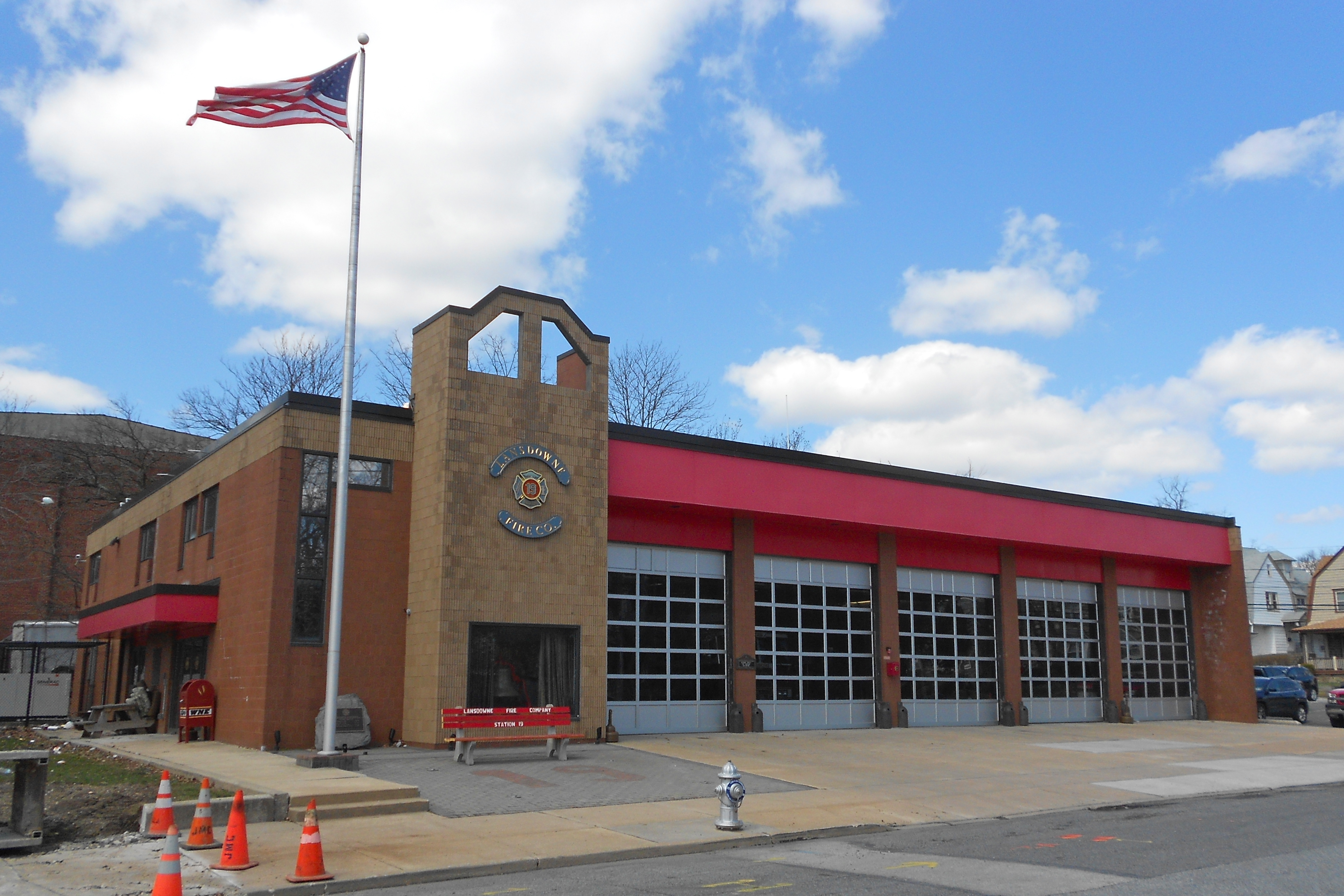
Fire Station 19

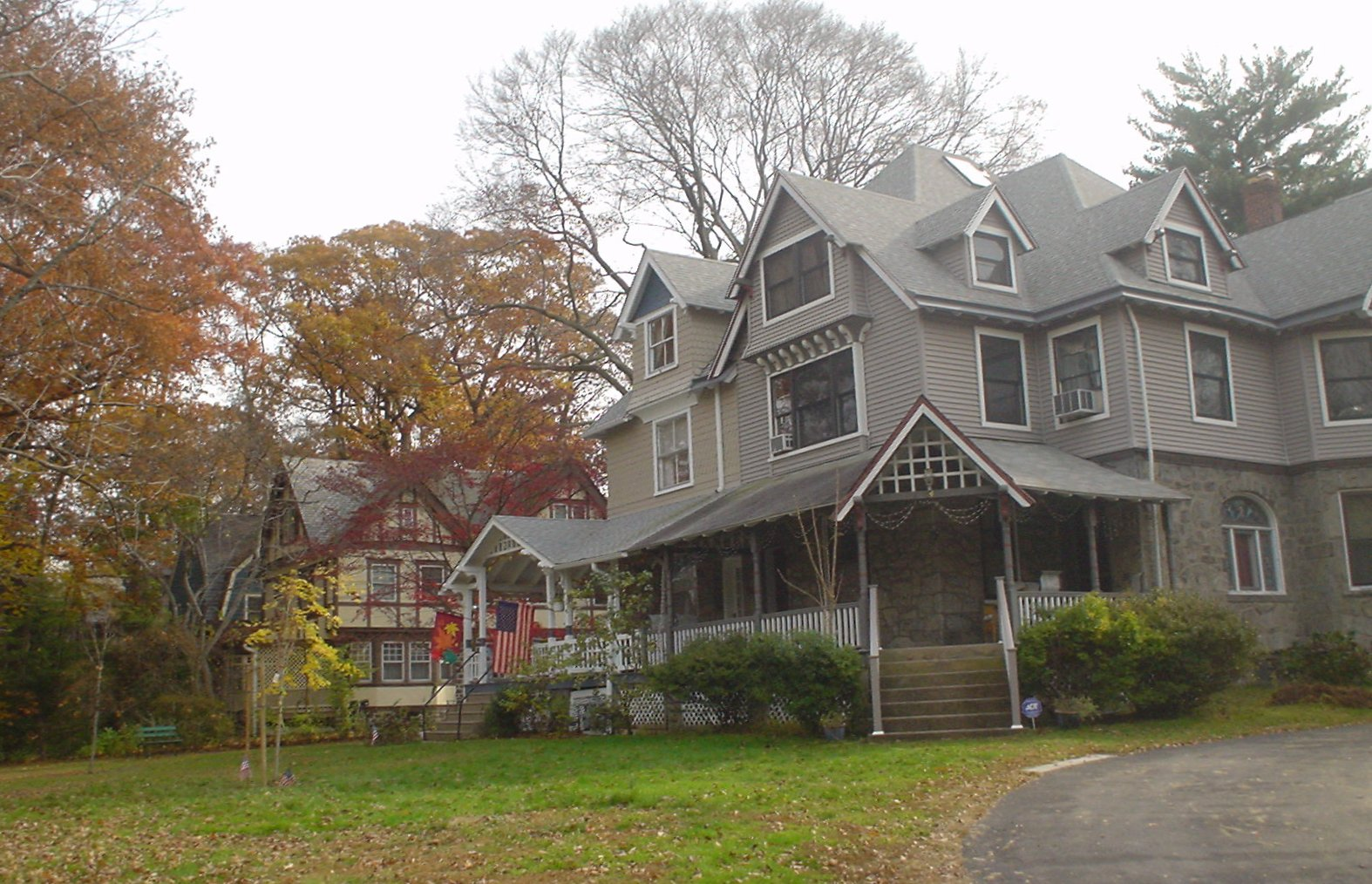
The Albertson subdivision, built between 1890 and 1940, is a historic district recognized by the National Register of Historic Places.

Lansdowne was once a vacation resort for residents of Philadelphia. People traveled by rail and horse to relax in the borough's Victorian homes. Many of the homes have since been turned into multiple-dwelling apartments which, due to zoning law changes, is no longer an option. Lansdowne is trying to preserve the integrity of its stately homes.

It is home to numerous arts and music organizations, including the Lansdowne Symphony Orchestra, Spotlight Theatre, the Lansdowne Folk Club, Jamey's House of Music and the Lansdowne Arts Festival. The Farmers Market runs, rain or shine, on Saturdays from 9 am to 1 pm, between Memorial Day and Halloween.

The fire department was incorporated December 4, 1894, and provides a career ambulance service alongside a volunteer fire service. The borough's fire service is supplemented by the Yeadon, Clifton Heights, East Lansdowne, and Garrettford-Drexel Hill Fire Companies.

The borough has several historic buildings, including four sites on the National Register of Historic Places. They are the Lansdowne Theatre, Twentieth Century Club of Lansdowne, Henry Albertson Subdivision Historic District, and Lansdowne Park Historic District. There has recently been a movement to re-open the theater. The marquee was ceremoniously re-lit on October 5, 2012 after much reconstruction, indicating that the movement is healthy.

A community of Scottish weavers lived and worked on Scottdale Road by the Darby Creek in the 19th century. Some of their houses are still in existence. A Quaker community and a Friends' Meeting House are located on Lansdowne Avenue.

Lansdowne is also home to a 350-year-old sycamore tree, one of the largest in the state of Pennsylvania.

== Environmental remediation ==
The W.L. Cummings Radium Processing Co. conducted radium enrichment processing for medical research at their facility on Austin Avenue from 1915 to 1920. The operations created radioactive waste of a sandy material called tailings. Building contractors used the tailings in mortar for the construction of walls and foundations in houses and businesses built nearby. The U.S. Environmental Protection Agency (EPA) checked thousands of properties in a 12.5 mile radius of the original contaminated site through usage of a van loaded with radiation detection instrumentation. The EPA discovered 40 residential properties in Lansdowne and nearby East Lansdowne, Upper Darby, Aldan, Yeadon and Darby contaminated with radium, thorium, radon and asbestos. In 1995, the EPA and the U.S. Army Corps of Engineers partnered to conduct clean-up operations which included dismantling the contaminated W.L. Cummings warehouse, removal of contaminated soil and rebuilding 11 homes. A five-year review conducted by the EPA in 2000 concluded that the clean-up has been effective.

A University of Pennsylvania professor, Dicran Kabakjian, developed the radium enrichment process for W.L. Cummings. He set up a separate business in the basement of his home at 105 Stratford Avenue. From 1924 to 1944, Kabakjian processed enriched radium ore for usage in radium-tipped needles. The processing activities in the basement resulted in radium contamination of the house and nearby properties. The EPA placed the site on the National Priorities List in 1985 and conducted clean-up activities between 1986 and 1989. The house was dismantled and carted away by the EPA to a special landfill at a cost of $12 million. Following clean-up activities, the site was removed from the Superfund list in 1991.

== Transportation ==
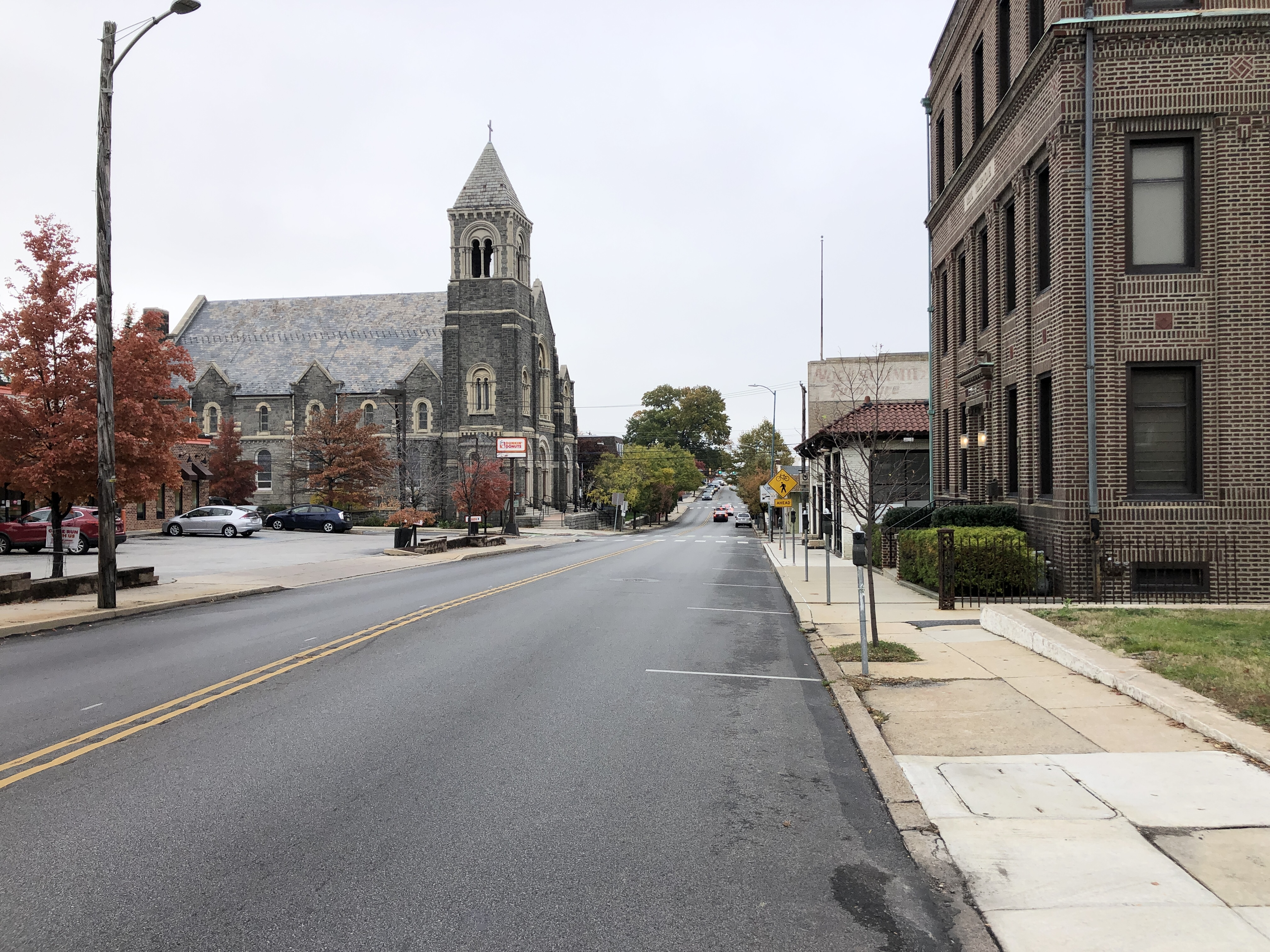
Baltimore Avenue in Lansdowne

As of 2010 there were 24.92 miles (40.10 km) of public roads in Lansdowne, of which 3.25 miles (5.23 km) were maintained by the Pennsylvania Department of Transportation (PennDOT) and 21.67 miles (34.87 km) were maintained by the borough.

No numbered highways serve Lansdowne directly. Main thoroughfares in the borough include Baltimore Avenue, which follows a southwest-to-northwest alignment, and Lansdowne Avenue, which follows as northwest-to-southeast alignment. The two roads meet near the center of town.

Lansdowne is served by SEPTA Regional Rail's Media/Wawa Line at Lansdowne Station and Gladstone Station providing service to Center City Philadelphia. SEPTA Suburban Bus routes 113, 115, 107, and 109 connect the borough with 69th Street Transit Center, Darby Transportation Center, and Chester Transit Center. The Media–Sharon Hill Line is immediately adjacent to the borough along Garrett Road in nearby Upper Darby Township

== Notable people ==
- Leroy Burrell, former world champion, world record holder, Olympic silver medalist in the 100 meters, and current track coach at the University of Houston
- Pat Croce, former Philadelphia 76ers president and founder of Novacare
- Jessica Dragonette, former singer and movie actress
- Steve Gunn, musician
- Bruce Harlan, 1948 Olympic gold medalist in diving
- Jerome Hewlett, hip-hop pioneer, DJ Cash Money
- Joan Jett, rock musician
- Jeff LaBar, best known from the band Cinderella
- Andrea Lee, New Yorker short story writer
- Joe Lunardi, ESPN college basketball analyst and creator of "Bracketology"
- John P. McDonald, librarian and director of libraries at the University of Connecticut
- Larry Mendte, former anchorman for CBS3 in Philadelphia
- Winant Sidle, U.S. Army major general
- Kurt Vile, indie rock musician
- Frank D. Wagner, Supreme Court Reporter of Decisions
