= Lansdowne Park Historic District =

Historic district in Pennsylvania, United States

- U.S. National Register of Historic Places
- U.S. Historic district
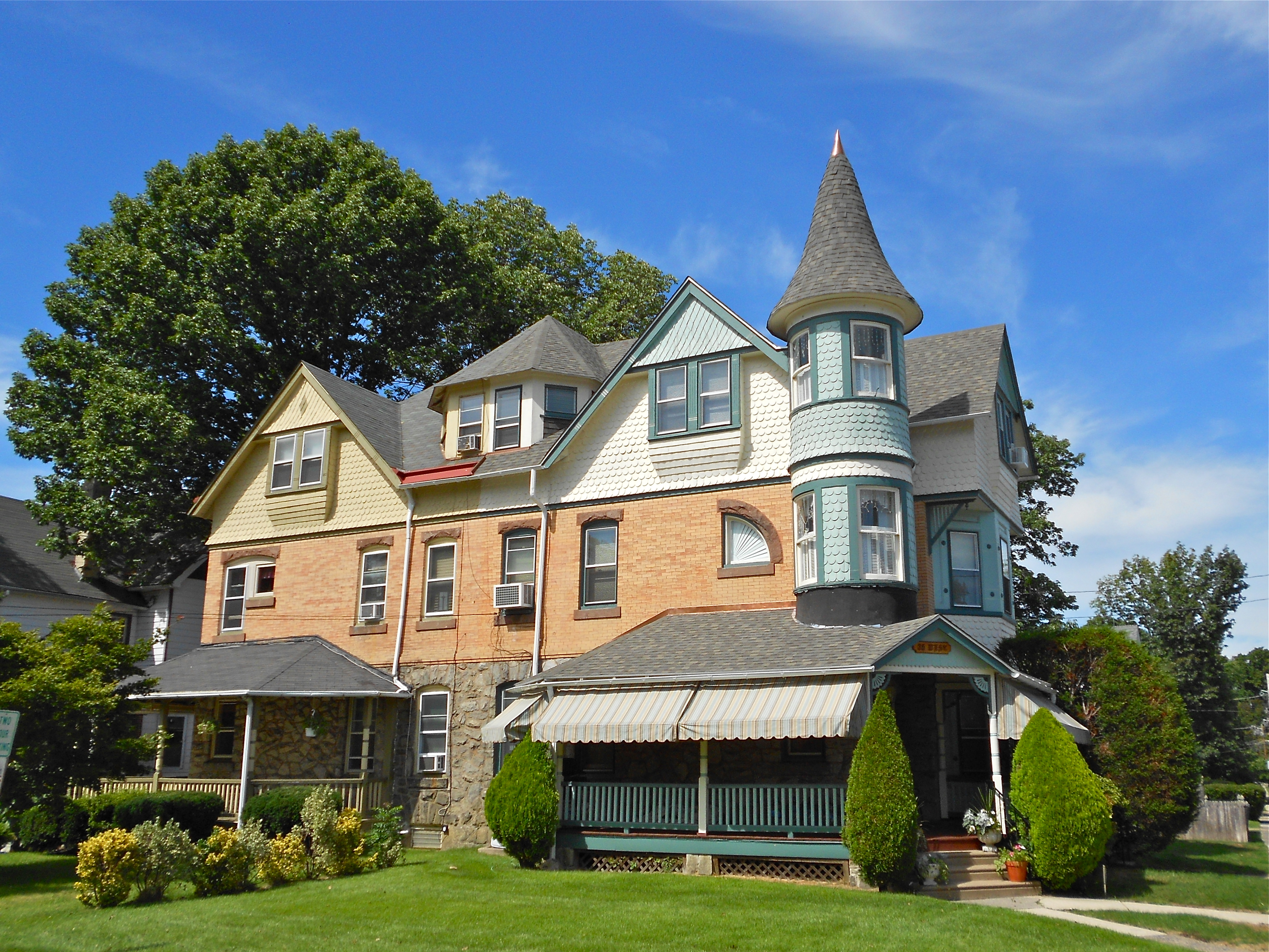
- Lansdowne Park Historic District, September 2012

- Location within Pennsylvania Location within the United States
- Location: W. Greenwood, Owen, W. Baltimore, Windermere, & W. Stratford Aves., Lansdowne, Pennsylvania
- Coordinates: 39°56′22″N 75°16′33″W
- Area: 33.3 acres (13.5 ha)
- Architect: William H. Free
- Architectural style: Dutch Colonial Revival, Queen Anne, Georgian Revival
- NRHP reference No.: 87001986
- Added to NRHP: November 5, 1987

The Lansdowne Park Historic District is a national historic district that is located in Lansdowne, Delaware County, Pennsylvania, USA.

It was added to the National Register of Historic Places in 1987.

== History and architectural features ==
This district includes 103 contributing buildings; the majority are residences. Eighty-one of the houses were built between 1889 and 1891, with Queen Anne as the dominant architectural style. The remaining houses were built between 1899 and 1913 and include notable examples of the Dutch Colonial Revival and Georgian Revival styles. The oldest house is the Dickenson Farmstead, a 2½-story dwelling built in 1732 and expanded in 1790. A notable non-residential building located in the district is St. John's Episcopal Church (1901); it closed in 2009.

== Gallery ==
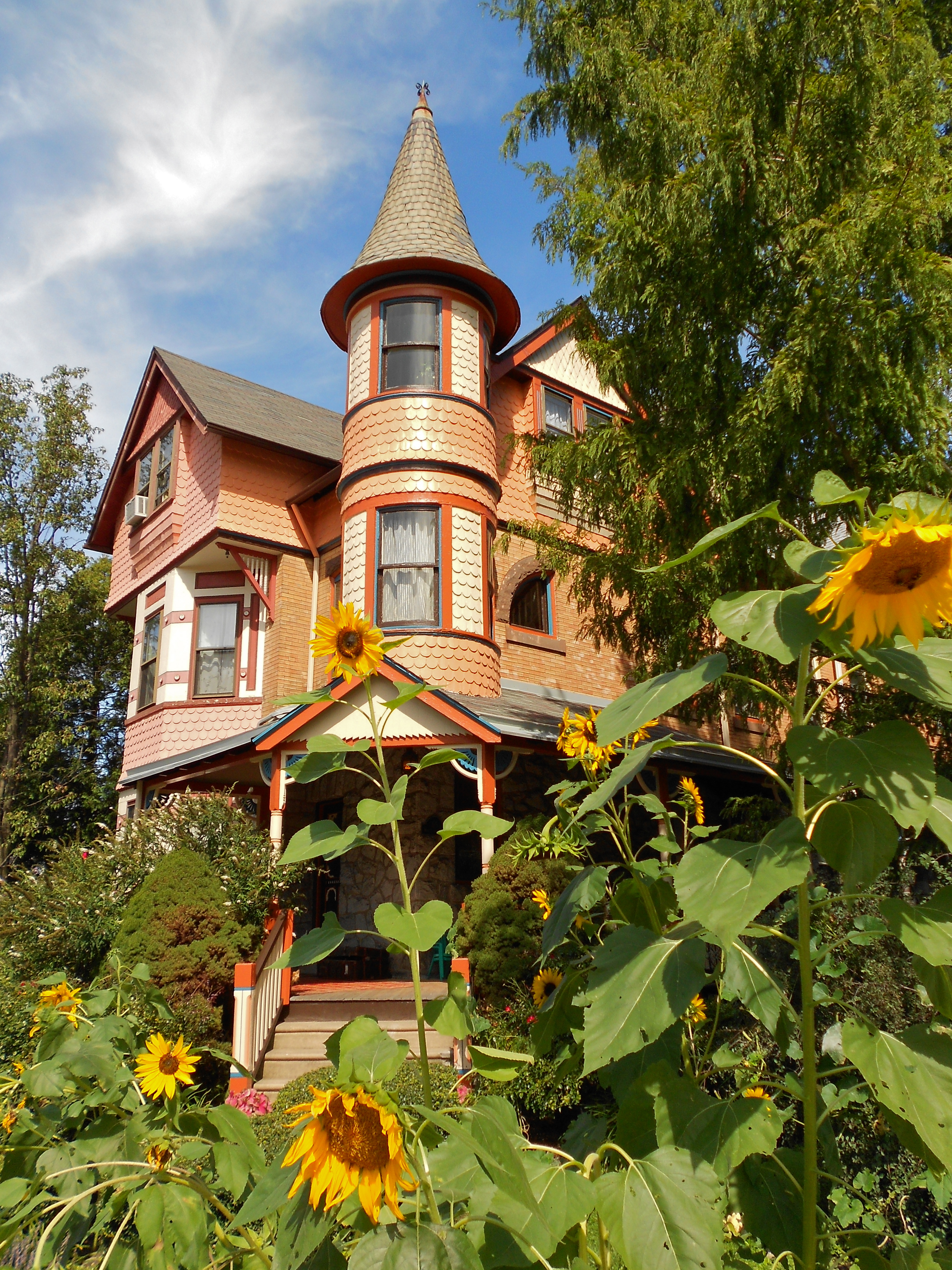
House on Runnemede.

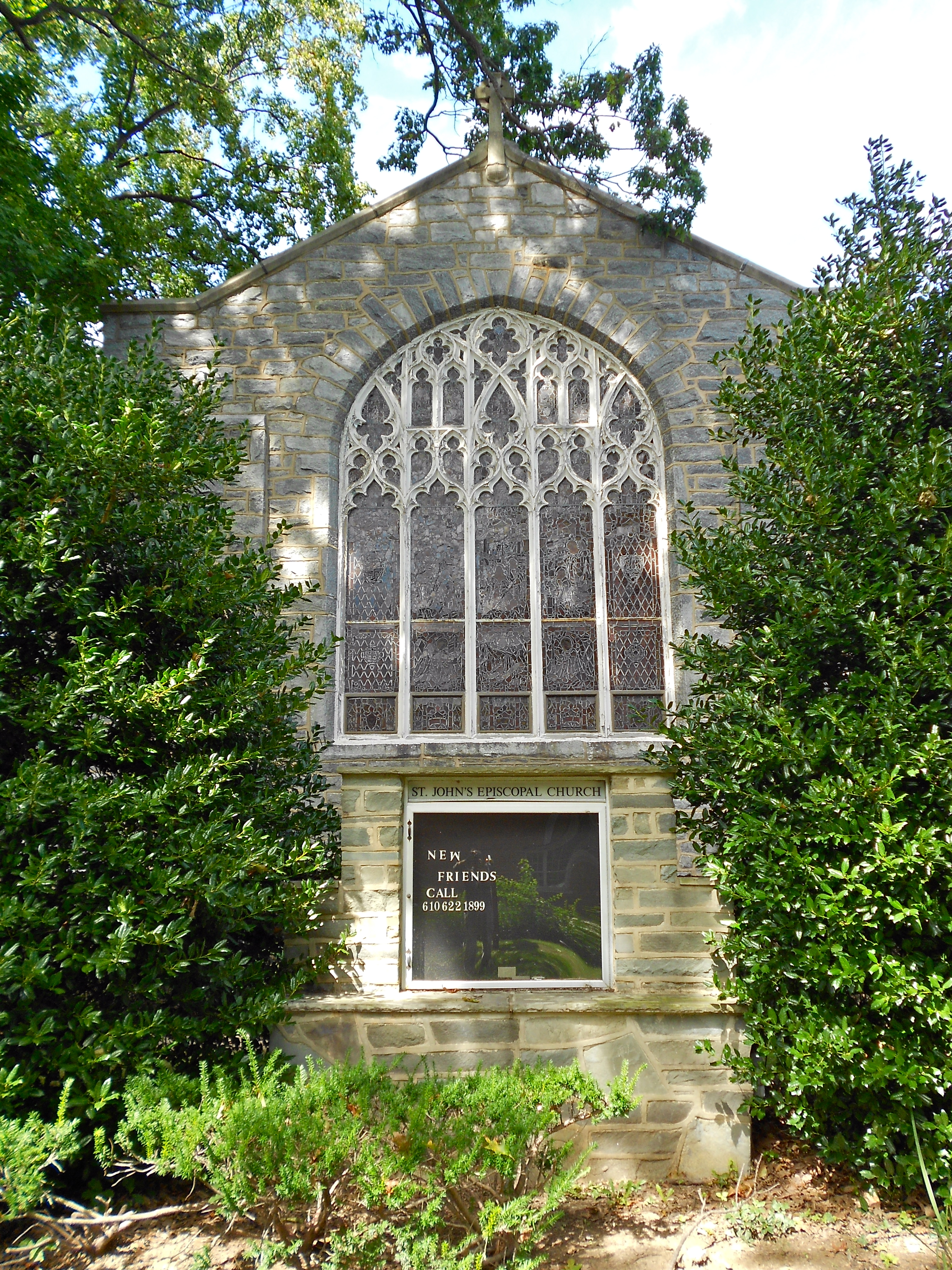
St. John's Episcopal Church

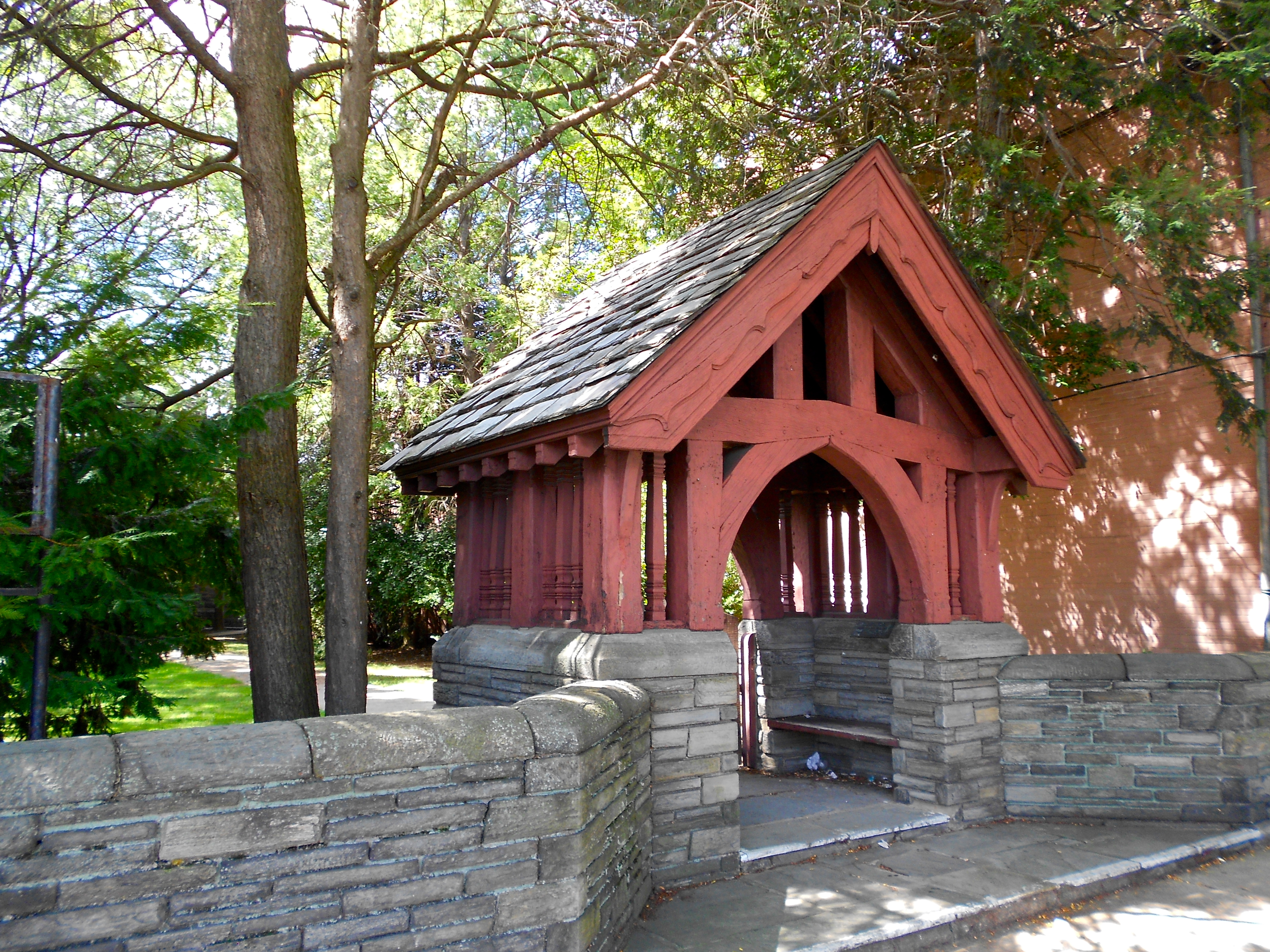
Gateway to St. John's

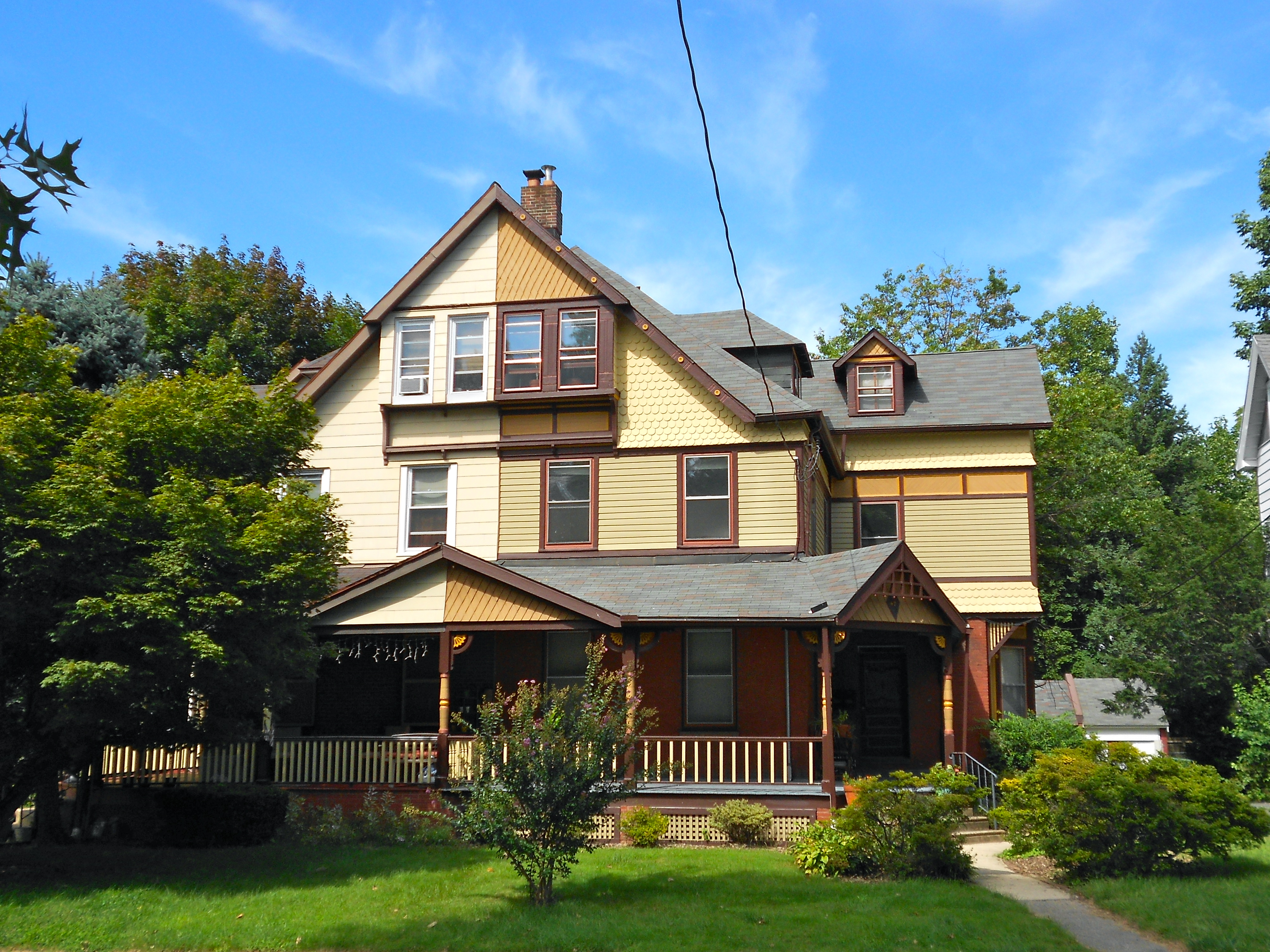
Double house on LaCrosse

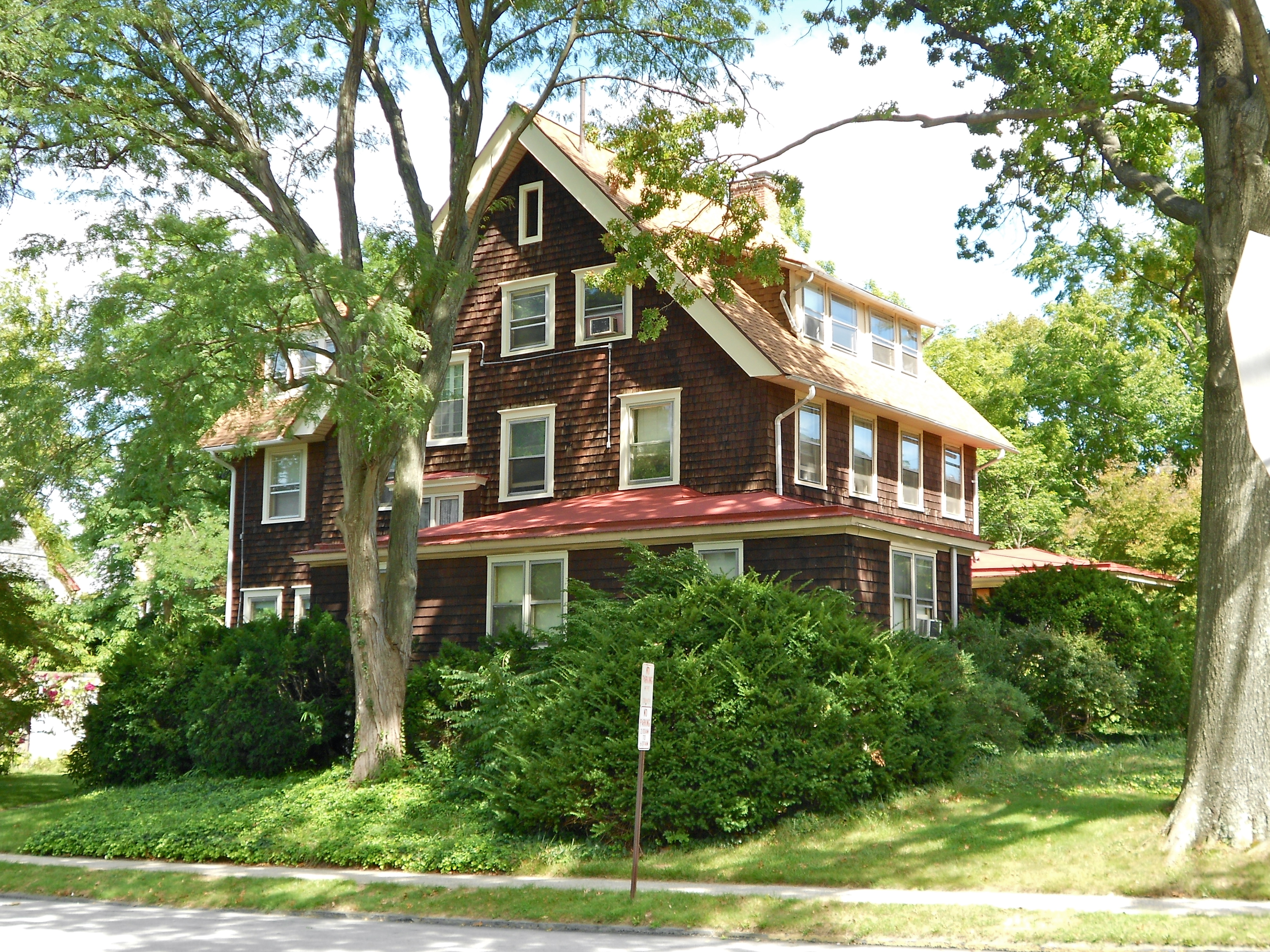
Stratford and Owen Avenue

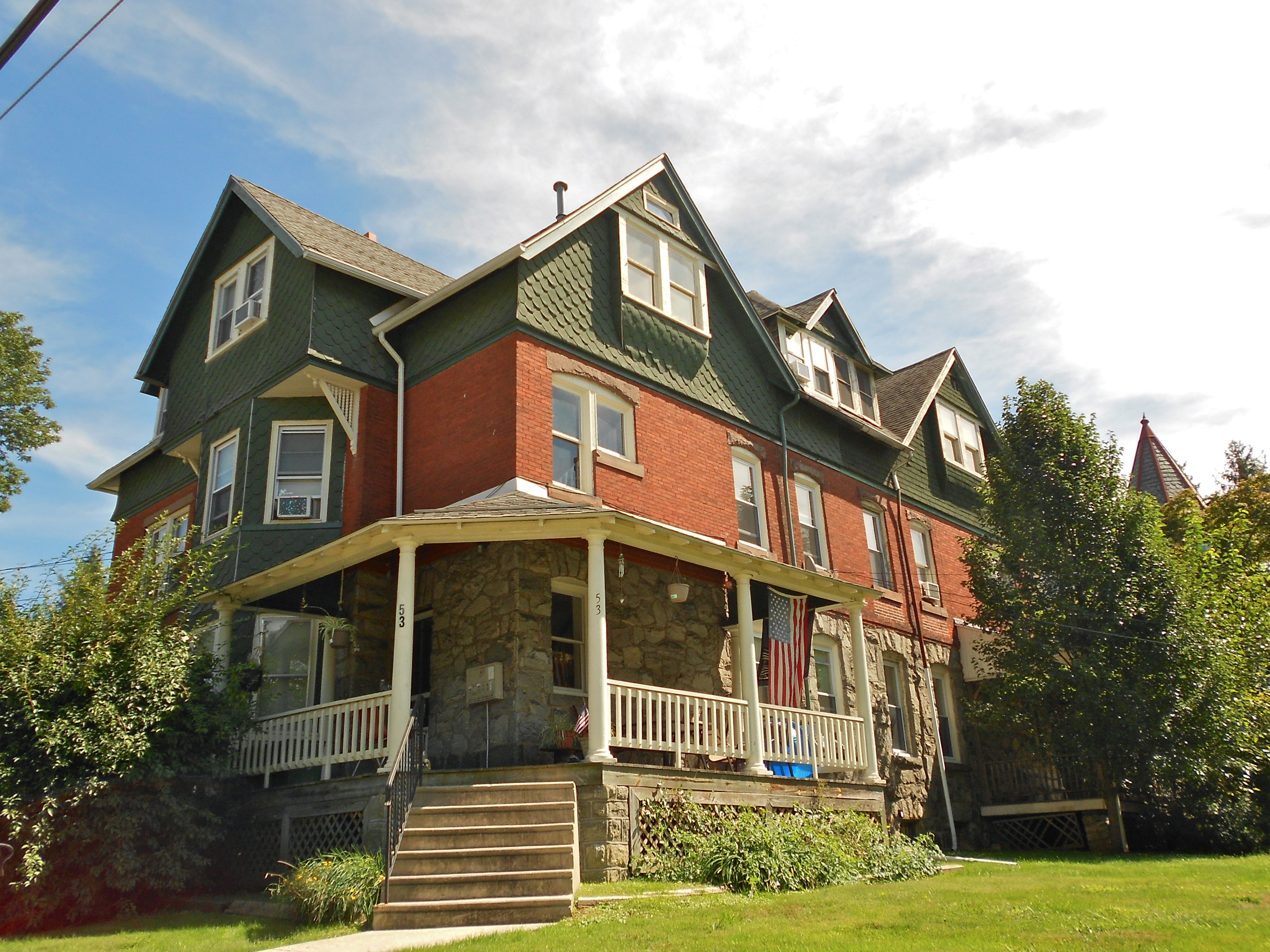
House on Windmere

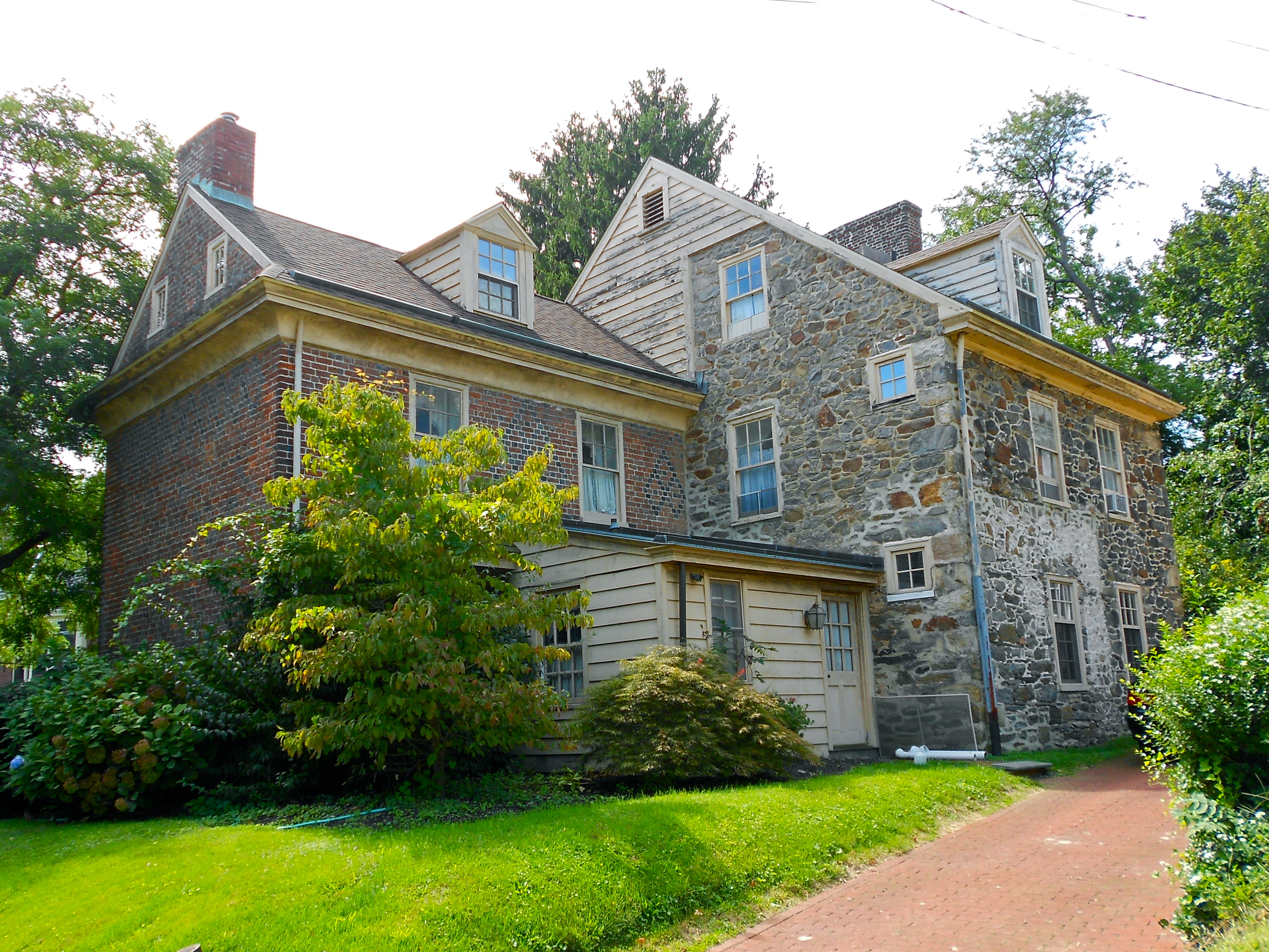
Dickenson Farmstead, built 1732
