= Century Club =

Century Club may refer to:

- The Century Club of San Diego, California
- Century Club of Scranton, Pennsylvania
- Travelers' Century Club, a club for travelers who have visited 100 or more countries of the world
- DX Century Club, an amateur radio operating award for contacting 100 geographic entities
- VHF/UHF Century Club, an amateur radio operating award for contacting 100 stations in other Maidenhead grid locators
- FIFA Century Club; see
  - List of men's footballers with 100 or more international caps
  - List of women's footballers with 100 or more international caps

== See also ==
- New Century Club (disambiguation)
- The Nineteenth Century Club, Memphis, Tennessee
- Twentieth Century Club (disambiguation)
- The Century Association, New York City
