= Twentieth Century Club of Lansdowne =

- U.S. National Register of Historic Places
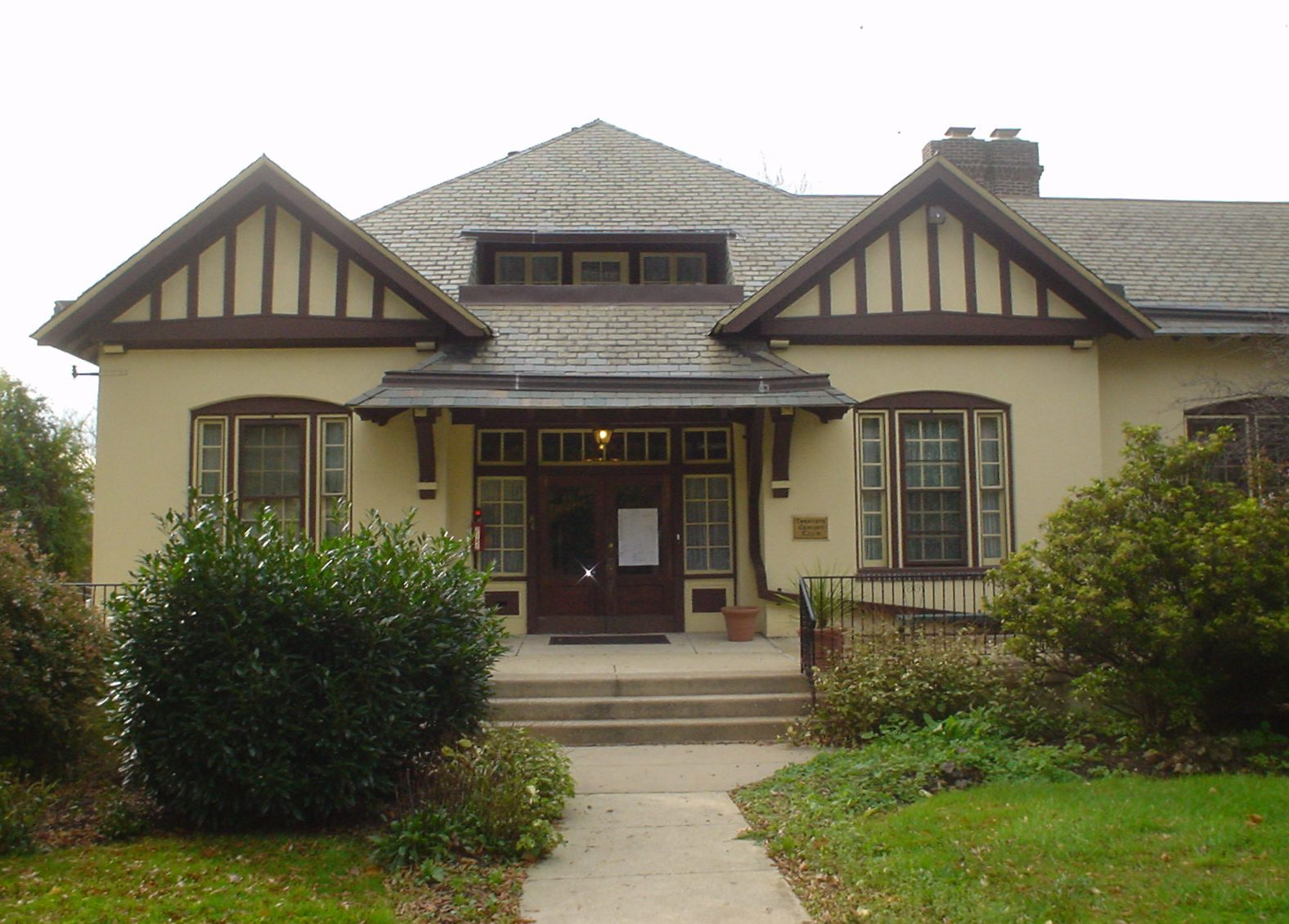
- Twentieth Century Club of Lansdowne, November 2009

- Location within Pennsylvania Location within the United States
- Location: 84 S. Lansdown Ave., Lansdowne, Pennsylvania
- Coordinates: 39°56′8″N 75°17′4″W
- Area: 1 acre (0.40 ha)
- Built: 1911
- Architect: Heacock & Hokanson; Groover, George W.
- NRHP reference No.: 80003485
- Added to NRHP: July 23, 1980

Twentieth Century Club of Lansdowne is a historic club building located at Lansdowne, Delaware County, Pennsylvania. It was built in 1911, and is a 1 1/2-story, rectangular stone and brick building measuring 43 feet, 10 inches, by 95 feet, 6 inches. It has a small rear wing, slate pyramid-shaped roof with two projecting front gables, and a large articulated chimney.

It was added to the National Register of Historic Places in 1980.
