= New Century Club (Milford, Delaware) =

- Milford New Century Club
- U.S. National Register of Historic Places
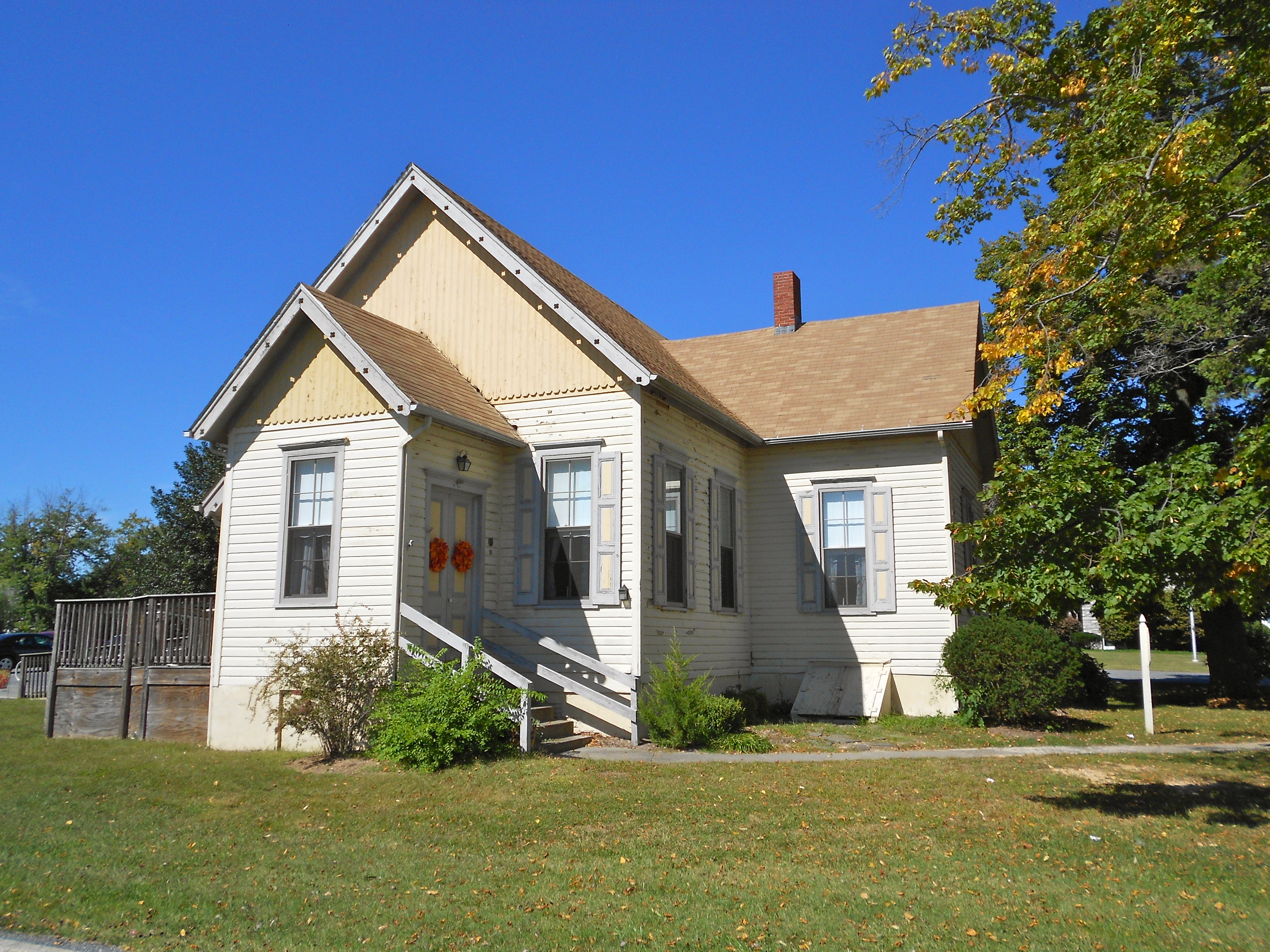

- Location within Delaware Location within the United States
- Location: 6 S. Church Ave. Milford, Delaware
- Coordinates: 38°54′44″N 75°25′53″W
- Area: 0.2 acres (0.081 ha)
- Built: 1885
- Architectural style: Late Gothic Revival
- MPS: Milford MRA
- NRHP reference No.: 82002322
- Added to NRHP: April 22, 1982

Milford New Century Club is a historic women's club house in Milford, Kent County, Delaware, USA. It was built in 1885 as a schoolhouse for the Classical Academy. It is a one-story, T-shaped building with a gable roof in the Late Gothic Revival style. The New Century Club was organized in 1898, and purchased the building in 1905, after meeting at the building starting in 1898 and leasing it since 1900.

It was listed on the National Register of Historic Places in 1982.

== See also ==
- New Century Club (Wilmington, Delaware)
- National Register of Historic Places listings in Kent County, Delaware
