= Delaware Children's Theatre =

- New Century Club
- U.S. National Register of Historic Places
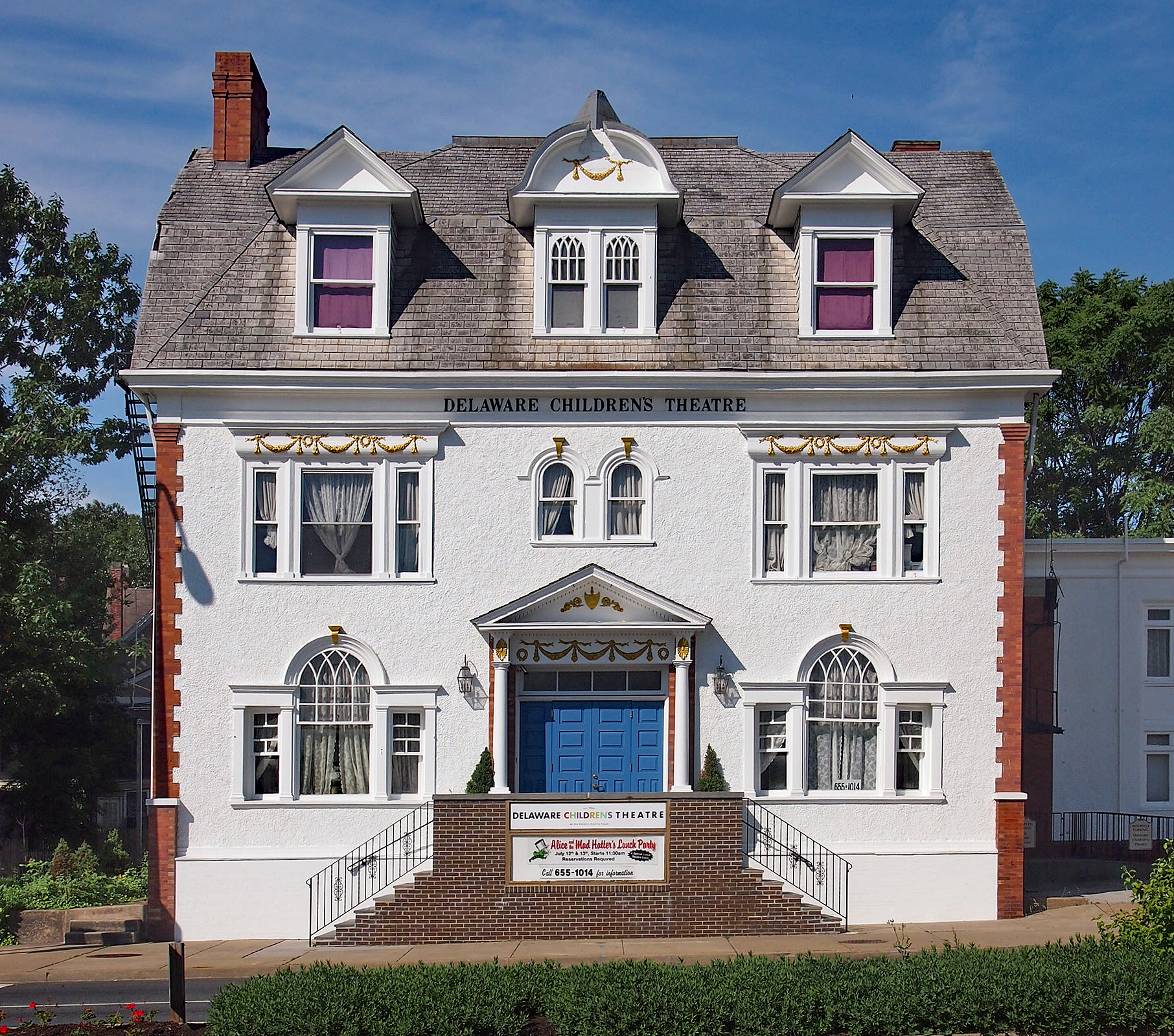
- The front of the theatre

- Location within Delaware Location within the United States
- Location: 1014 Delaware Avenue, Wilmington, Delaware
- Coordinates: 39°45′6″N 75°33′22″W
- Area: Cool Springs neighborhood
- Built: 1893
- Architect: Minerva Parker Nicholas
- Architectural style: Colonial revival
- NRHP reference No.: 83001336
- Added to NRHP: 1983-06-16

The Delaware Children's Theatre (DCT) is a community theatre in Wilmington, Delaware, United States. The theatre company occupies the historic New Century Club building.

== Theatre company ==
Originally named the Children's Repertory Theatre of Wilmington, the organization began in 1973 with their first production of Pinocchio. The organization relies on volunteers for all acting and nearly all support positions as a community theater. To cover operating expenses, DCT sells tickets and receives state support through the Delaware Division of the Arts.

It operates as a 501(c)(3) Public Charity. In 2023 it claimed total revenue of $199,891 and total assets of $395,155.

Tony Award winner John Gallagher, Jr. initially played Tom Sawyer as a child actor at the theatre before going on to Broadway.

== New Century Club ==
The Theatre occupies the historic New Century Club building. The organization constructed the building in 1893 and occupied it until 1975. The Delaware Dinner Theatre and Delaware Ballet Company then used the building until 1982 when DCT moved in.

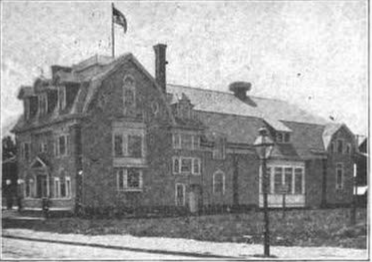
The club in 1902, prior to construction of adjacent buildings

Minerva Parker Nichols of Philadelphia, an early female architect, designed the Colonial Revival building with Palladian windows and a gambrel roof. While serving partly as a clubhouse, it also held a theatre which was used for traveling shows as well as civic speakers, including future president Woodrow Wilson and birth control advocate Margaret Sanger.

The structure is listed as on the National Register of Historic Places and recognized as being an active place for the women's rights movement. The New Century Club was a progressive upper class women's group dedicated to social improvement and charity as well as women's suffrage. Notable members of the Club included Emily P. Bissell, a Red Cross campaigner against tuberculosis who has a state hospital named after her, and Emalea Pusey Warner, who successfully campaigned for public vocational education and has a local elementary school named in her honor. Other New Century women's clubs formed nearby in Milford and Newark, Delaware, as well as in Kennett Square, West Chester, and Chester, Pennsylvania.

== See also ==
- New Century Club (Utica, New York)
- Grand Opera House (Wilmington, Delaware)
- National Register of Historic Places listings in Wilmington, Delaware
