= Lansdowne Symphony Orchestra =

American orchestra in Lansdowne, Pennsylvania

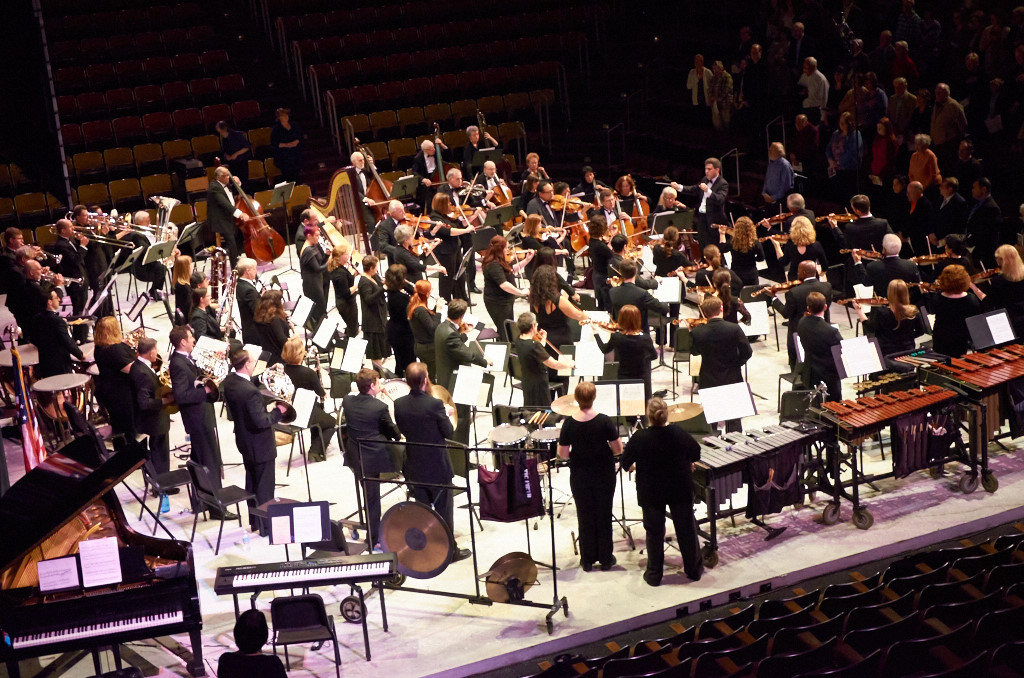
A view inside the orchestra

The Lansdowne Symphony Orchestra is one of the oldest community orchestras in the Greater Philadelphia area, and is located in Lansdowne, Delaware County, Pennsylvania. In existence since 1945, the orchestra's season runs from October through April, performing five concerts at the Upper Darby Performing Arts Center. The Lansdowne Symphony Orchestra was nominated for a Grammy and won The American Prize Ernst Bacon Memorial Award for the Performance of American Music, community instrumental division, 2018-19 for its première recording, American Romantics.

== Music directors ==
- Raymond Mason, 1946–1950
- Clarence Mayer, 1950–1952
- Harry Mitchell, 1952–1953
- Felix Molzer, 1953–1955
- Henri Elkan, 1955–1980
- Jacques Voois, 1980–1991
- Irving Ludwig, 1991–2012
- Reuben Blundell, 2014–present
