= Friends meeting houses in Pennsylvania =

Friends meeting houses are places of worship for the Religious Society of Friends, or Quakers. A "meeting" is the equivalent of a church congregation, and a "meeting house" is the equivalent of a church building.

Several Friends meetings were founded in Pennsylvania in the early 1680s. (Note: Charles II of England granted a charter to William Penn for the Pennsylvania Colony in 1681, in repayment of a large debt to Penn's late father. Penn, a Quaker, quickly drew up plans to divide the land within the colony, but in a way that encouraged settlement rather than real estate speculation. Initially, Pennsylvania was a predominantly, but not exclusively, Quaker colony, with Huguenots, Jews, and other persecuted religious minorities among the settlers. Penn was one of about sixty passengers who arrived at Philadelphia aboard The Welcome, in October 1682. It is estimated that more than 2,000 European settlers arrived by ship in the first two years of the colony.) The Merion Friends Meeting House is the only surviving meeting house constructed before 1700. Thirty-two surviving Pennsylvania meeting houses were constructed before 1800, and are listed individually on the National Register of Historic Places (NRHP) or as contributing properties in historic districts. More than one hundred meeting houses constructed before 1900 were documented by the Historic American Buildings Survey, and published in Silent Witness: Quaker Meeting Houses in the Delaware Valley, 1695 to the Present (2002). Those that were involved in the Underground Railroad have been identified by the Federal NETWORK TO FREEDOM program (NTF).

One of the key tenets of the Religious Society of Friends is pacifism, adherence to the Peace Testimony. The "Free Quakers" were supporters of the American Revolutionary War, separated from the Society, and built their own meeting house in Philadelphia, at 5th & Arch Streets (1783).

In 1827, the Great Separation divided Pennsylvania Quakers into two branches, Orthodox and Hicksite. Many individual meetings also separated, but one branch generally kept possession of the meeting house. The two branches reunited in the 1950s.

== Meeting houses ==
Name	Photo	Founded	Constructed	Branch	Notes	Location	Reference
Abington Friends Meeting House		1683	1786	Hicksite		520 Meeting House Road, Jenkintown; 40.0939°N 75.1182°W	FMHS
Abington (Orthodox) Friends Meetinghouse		1827	1836	Orthodox		1059 Jenkintown Road, Jenkintown; 40.0888°N 75.1169°W	HABS
Arch Street Friends Meeting House		1681	1804, 1811	Orthodox	Philadelphia Yearly Meeting	304 Arch Street, Philadelphia; 39.9519°N 75.1462°W	NHL
Bart Friends Meeting		1820	1825	Hicksite		Quaker Church Road, Christiana; 39.9328°N 76.0473°W	
Birmingham Friends Meetinghouse	More images	1726	1763	Hicksite		Birmingham Road near SR 926, West Chester; 39.9057°N 75.5943°W	NRHP
Birmingham Orthodox Friends Meeting House					About 100 yd (91 m) from Hicksite meeting house; now a private home		NRHP
Bradford Friends Meetinghouse		1716, 1726	1765	Orthodox		1364 West Strasburg Road, Marshallton; 39.9496°N 75.6800°W	NRHP
Bristol Friends Meeting House		1707, 1711	1713–19	Hicksite		Market and Woods Streets, Bristol; 40.0963°N 74.8572°W	FMHS, NRHP HD
Buckingham Friends Meeting House	More images	1701, 1705	1768	Hicksite		5684 York Road (US 202), Lahaska; 40.3447°N 75.0387°W	NHL
Byberry Friends Meeting House		1683, 1701	1808	Hicksite		3001 Byberry Road, Philadelphia; 40.1025°N 74.9809°W	
Caln Meeting House		1716	1782	Shared	In 1907 the Orthodox Meeting moved to Coatesville	SR 340, Thorndale; 40.0073°N 75.7646°W	FMHS
Catawissa Friends Meetinghouse		1775, 1793	1794			South Street, Catawissa; 40.9510°N 76.4617°W	FMHS; NRHP
Chester Friends Meetinghouse		1675, 1698	1829, 1954			24th at Chestnut Street, Chester; 39.8694°N 75.3639°W	NRHP
Chestnut Hill Friends Meeting		1924	1931, 2012–2013	Shared	The 2013 building features a "Skyspace," a skylit room for quiet contemplation	100 East Mermaid Lane, Chestnut Hill, Philadelphia; 40.0685°N 75.196°W	HABS
Chichester Friends Meetinghouse		1682, 1701	1769	Hicksite		Meeting House Road, Boothwyn; 39.8365°N 75.4313°W	NRHP
Concord Friends Meetinghouse		1684	1728. 1788	Hicksite		Old Concord Road, Concordville; 39.8848°N 75.5192°W	NRHP, FMHS
Darby Friends Meeting		1682	1805	Hicksite		1015 Main Street, Darby; 39.9211°N 75.2629°W	NRHP NTF
Doe Run		1808, 1811	1883			81 Greenlaw Road, Cochraneville; 39.8892°N 75.8715°W	
Downingtown Friends Meeting House		1784, 1811	1806		Uwchlan Monthly Meeting moved here in 1900	800 East Lancaster Avenue, Downingtown; 40.0141°N 75.6889°W	FMHS, HABS
Exeter Friends Meeting House		1715, 1725	1759	Orthodox		Meeting House Road, Stonersville; 40.3132°N 75.7845°W	FMHS
Fair Hill Friends Meeting House		1702, 1880	1883			Cambria Street at Germantown Avenue, Philadelphia; 39.9962°N 75.1467°W	
Fallowfield Friends Meeting House		1792, 1796	1801 (1811?)	Hicksite		SR 82 at Buck Run Road, Ercildoun; 39.9461°N 75.8384°W	FMHS
2nd Falls Friends Meeting House		1683	1728	NA	Replaced by the 1789 third meeting house, housed a Friends School; now divided into apartments	Tyburn Road at New Falls Road, Fallsington; 40.1850°N 74.8200°W	FMHS
3rd Falls Friends Meeting House (now William Penn Center)		1683	1789	Orthodox	Houses the William Penn Center	9300 New Falls Road, Fallsington; 40.1849°N 74.8196°W	FMHS
4th Falls Friends Meeting House (located just north of the William Penn Center)		1683	1841	Hicksite	Interior:	9300 New Falls Road, Fallsington	
Frankford Friends Meeting House		1684	1775-76	Hicksite	Orthodox counterpart on Orthodox Street	Unity and Waln Streets, Philadelphia; 40.0111°N 75.0843°W	FMHS
Free Quaker Meetinghouse		1780	1783-84	Free Quaker	Closed 1836; home of the Apprentices' Library, 1841–1897. In an 1884 engraving:	5th and Arch Streets, Philadelphia; 39.9524°N 75.1487°W	NRHP
Germantown Friends Meeting House		1690	1868-69		Samuel Sloan and Addison Hutton, architects	47 West Coulter Street, Philadelphia; 40.0324°N 75.1720°W	
Goshen Friends Meeting House		1709	1855			814 Chester Road, Goshenville; 39.9933°N 75.5435°W	
Gwynedd Friends Meeting House		1689, 1698	1823	Hicksite		Spring House and Pennllyn Turnpike, Lower Gwyynedd; 40.2031°N 75.2557°W	
Old Haverford Friends Meetinghouse		1682, 1684	1701	Hicksite		235 East Eagle Road, Havertown; 39.9907°N 75.3047°W	FMHS
Homeville Friends Meeting House		1839	1839			Newark Road at SR 896, Homeville; 39.8608°N 75.9872°W	
Horsham Friends Meeting		1714, 1717	1803	Hicksite		SR 611 and Horsham Road, Horsham Township; 40.1836°N 75.1316°W	FMHS
Horsham Orthodox Friends Meeting House		1890	1890	Orthodox	Extant?	Saw Mill Lane and Dreshertown Road, Horsham Township; 40.1775°N 75.1397°W	
Old Kennett Meetinghouse		1707, 1711	1731 c.	Hicksite		US Route 1, Kennett Square; 39.8711°N 75.6481°W	FMHS
Lampeter Friends Meeting House		1728, 1732	1889			SR 340, Bird-in-Hand; 40.0390°N 76.1850°W	
Little Elk Friends Meeting House			1826			Media Road, Hickory Hill; 39.7485°N 75.9304°W	
London Grove Friends Meeting House		1724, 1775	1818			SR 926 at Newark Road, West Marlborough Township; 39.8696°N 75.7735°W	
Longwood Progressive Friends Meeting House		1854	1854			US 1 at Longwood Gardens; 39.8687°N 75.6713°W	
Maidencreek Friends Meeting House		1732, 1735	1759	Hicksite		West Shore Drive, Kindts Corner (building moved 1929); 40.4622°N 75.9308°W	FMHS
Makefield Friends Meeting House		1750, 1790	1760, 1764	Hicksite		877 Dolington Road, Lower Makefield; 40.2658°N 74.8868°W	NRHP, FMHS
Marlboro Friends Meeting House		1799, 1802	1801		Part of Marlborough Village Historic District	901 Marlborough Springs Road, Marlborough Village; 39.8956°N 75.7046°W	FMHS
Media Monthly Meeting House		1878	1875	Orthodox	Known as Chester Monthly Meeting until 1950?	Third Street, Media; 39.9213°N 75.3913°W	
Merion Friends Meeting House	More images	1683	1695-1714	Hicksite	In an 1837 engraving:	615 Montgomery Avenue, Merion Station; 40.0097°N 75.2544°W	NHL
Middletown Friends Meeting House		1680, 1683	1793	Hicksite		453 West Maple Avenue, Langhorne; 40.1752°N 74.9288°W	FMHS
Middletown Friends Meetinghouse		1686, 1701	1702, 1770s, 1888			435 Middletown Road, Lima; 39.9245°N 75.4429°W	
Millville Friends Meeting House		1795	1846	Hicksite		Main and Maple Streets, Millville; 41.1231°N 76.5260°W	HABS
New Garden Friends Meeting House		1712, 1715	1743	Hicksite		Newark Road, Toughkenamon; 39.8150°N 75.7526°W	FMHS
Newtown Friends Meeting House		1815, 1817	1817, 1868	Hicksite		219 Court Street, Newtown; 40.2257°N 74.9357°W	
Newtown Square Friends Meeting House		1696, 1706	1791	Hicksite		120 Newtown Road (SR 252), Newtown Square; 39.9918°N 75.4050°W	FMHS
Norristown Friends Meeting House			1890			Swede and Pine Streets, Norristown	
Oxford Friends Meeting House		1876	1879			South 3rd Street, Oxford; 39.7801°N 75.9808°W	
Parkersville Friends Meetinghouse		1830	1830	Hicksite		Parkersville Road, south of SR 926 Parkersville; 39.8861°N 75.6452°W	NRHP
Plumsted Friends Meeting House		1730	1752, 1876			4914 Point Pleasant Pike, Danboro; 40.3671°N 75.1145°W	FMHS
Plymouth Friends Meetinghouse	More images	1703, 1710	1708, 1780	Hicksite		Germantown Pike, Plymouth Meeting; 40.1025°N 75.2792°W	NRHP
Providence Friends Meeting House	Providence Friends Meeting Media	1686	1700, 1727, 1753	Hicksite		Providence Road, Media; 39.9183°N 75.3810°W	HABS
Providence Quaker Cemetery and Chapel		1789	1793		Closed 1870	SR 4038 at SR 4036 W, Perryopolis; 40.072778°N 79.782222°W,	NRHP
Race Street Friends Meeting House			1855–57		Interior:	1515 Cherry Street, Philadelphia; 39.9559°N 75.1651°W	NRHP
Radnor Friends Meetinghouse	More images	1684, 1698	1717-18	Hicksite		Sproul Road (SR 320), Ithan; 40.0300°N 75.3643°W	
Reading Friends Meeting House		1750, 1756	1868		Wilson Eyre	108 North 6th Street, Reading; 40.3375°N 75.9263°W	HABS
Richlands Friends Meeting House		1710, 1723	1862			Main Street at Mill Road, Quakertown; 40.4367°N 75.3522°W	
Roaring Creek Friends Meeting		1786, 1796	1795-96	Hicksite	Interior:	Quaker Meeting Road, Numidia; 40.8981°N 76.3986°W	FMHS
Sadsbury Friends Meeting House		1723, 1725	1747	Hicksite		Simmontown Road, Gap; 39.9709°N 75.9908°W	FMHS, HABS
Schuylkill Friends Meeting House		1812	1807, 1816	Hicksite	Charlestown Friends until 1826	37 North Whitehorse Road, Phoenixville; 40.1209°N 75.5019°W	
Solebury Friends Meeting House		1806, 1811	1806			2680 Sugan Road, New Hope; 40.3728°N 74.9874°W	
Springfield Friends Meetinghouse	Springfield Friends Delco	1686	1703, 1783, 1850				
Swarthmore Friends Meeting House		1863, 1893	1881	Hicksite		12 Whittier Place, Swarthmore; 39.9073°N 75.3533°W	
Twelfth Street Meeting House (now George School Meeting House)	^{Circa-1892 photograph}^{Disassembled, July 1972}		1813–1814, relocated 1972	Orthodox	Built by carpenter John D. Smith using elements of the Greater Meeting House, 1813–1814; disassembled and relocated, summer 1972; rebuilt on campus of the George School, 1973–1974, Charles Hough, restoration architect; rededicated September 24, 1974	Original: 20 South 12th Street, Philadelphia; 39.951167°N 75.160278°W Current: George School, Newtown, Bucks County; 40.211278°N 74.93375°W	HABS
Unionville Friends Meeting House		1845	1845		Now Grange Hall	SR 82, Unionville; 39.8956°N 75.7307°W	FMHS
Upper Dublin Friends Meeting House		1814	1814	Hicksite		Fort Washington and Limekiln Road, Upper Dublin; 40.1622°N 75.1878°W	
Upper Providence Friends Meeting House		1716, 1733	1828	Hicksite		8207 Black Rock Road, Oaks; 40.1490°N 75.4758°W	HABS
Uwchlan Meetinghouse		1712, 1714	1763 c.	Orthodox		Village Avenue North, Lionville; 40.0545°N 75.6599°W	FMHS
Valley Friends Meeting House		1698, 1810	1871			1121 Old Eagle School Road, Wayne; 40.0826°N 75.4151°W	
Warrington Friends Meeting House			1769			Carlisle Road, Wellsville; 40.0532°N 76.9298°W	
West Chester Meeting House		1810, 1813	1810, 1868	Hicksite		425 North High Street, West Chester; 39.9642°N 75.6078°W	
West Grove Friends Meeting House		1786	1903	Hicksite		153 East Harmony Road, West Grove; 39.8251°N 75.8247°W	HABS
West Philadelphia Friends Meeting House		1837	1901	Hicksite		3500 Lancaster Avenue, Philadelphia; 39.9577°N 75.1927°W	HABS
West Philadelphia Orthodox Friends Meeting House		1878	1878	Orthodox		Powelton and 42nd Streets, Philadelphia; 39.9592°N 75.2066°W	
Willistown Friends Meeting House		1753, 1794	1798	Hicksite	Part of Okehocking Historic District	7069 Goshen Road, Whitehorse; 39.9886°N 75.4809°W	FMHS
Wrightstown Friends Meeting Complex		1686	1787	Hicksite		SR 413, 4 miles (6.4 km) north of Newtown; 40.2657°N 74.9818°W	NRHP, FMHS
York Friends Meeting House		1754, 1767	1766, 1783	Hicksite		Philadelphia Street, York; 39.9630°N 76.7317°W	FMHS

== Demolished meeting houses ==
Name	Image	Founded	Constructed	Demolished	Notes	Location	Reference
Centre Square Meeting House	_{Shown at center of map}	1684	1685-1687 (Note: "We are now laying the foundation of a new brick meeting-house in the Centre [Square] (sixty feet long and about forty feet broad), and hope to soon have it up, there being many hearts and hands at work that will do it." — Robert Turner to William Penn, August 3, 1685.)	Summer 1702	Built on what is now the site of Philadelphia City Hall Salvaged materials from it were used to build the Bank; Meeting House	Broad and High (Market) Streets, Philadelphia	
Chester Friends Meeting House		1675	1687–1693	c.1735	William Penn attended meeting in Chester, probably in a private home, soon after his October 1682 arrival.	2nd Street and Edgmont Avenue, Chester	
Chester Friends Meeting House			1736	1926	Continued to hold Hicksite services after the Orthodox Friends departed in 1829 until 1926.	3rd and Market (now Welsh) Streets, Chester	
Evening Meeting House (Note: "Friends were long accustomed to hold night meetings on the Sabbath. Their house on the Bank Hill, on Front Street, was at first called Evening Meeting because [it was] chiefly made for such a convenience when that at Centre Square was too far off.") replaced on the same site by Bank Meeting House		1682	1683-1685 (Note: "[Construction of a] large meeting-house, fifty feet long and thirty-eight broad, also going on in the front of the river for an evening meeting." — Robert Turner to William Penn, August 3, 1685.)	1698	A temporary, wood-frame building, built on Bank Hill, along the Delaware River. (Note: The Evening Meeting House was located on the west side of Front Street, at or slightly north of the present crossing of the Benjamin Franklin Bridge.); Also used for meetings of the Pennsylvania General; Assembly and Provincial Council.	West side of Front Street, between Race and Vine Streets, Philadelphia	
Bank Meeting House (Note: The ministers' galleries from the Bank Meeting House survive at the Sadsbury Meeting House in Lancaster County, Pennsylvania.)		1682	1703		A large two-story, three-bay brick building, 50 ft (15 m) square, with separate entrances for men and women. Built using salvaged materials from the demolished Centre Square Meeting House. Sold 1791.	West side of Front Street, between Race and Vine Streets, Philadelphia	
Fourth Street Meeting House and School			1763-1764	1859	A two-story brick building, "76 feet front on Fourth street, 42 feet deep." Built beside the Friends Public School (for boys). A school for girls occupied the meeting house's second floor.	East side of Fourth Street, between Chestnut and Sansom Streets, Philadelphia	PAB
Great Meeting House (High Street Meeting House) replaced on the same site by Greater Meeting House	_{Great Meeting House}		1695	1755	Interior lighted by a roof lantern. (Note: "It was surmounted, in the centre of its four-angled roof, by a raised frame of glass-work so constructed as to let light down into the meeting below, after the manner of the former Burlington [New Jersey] meeting-house.")	Southwest corner 2nd and Market Streets, Philadelphia	PAB
Greater Meeting House	_{Greater Meeting House}		1755	1812-1813	A square, two-and-a-half-story brick building, 57 ft (17 m) per side, built by carpenter Abraham Carlisle and his apprentice Isaac Coates. (Note: A floor joist from the Greater Meeting House is initialed and dated: "AC + IC 1755," spelled out in nailheads.) Dismantled by carpenter John D. Smith, and used to build Twelfth Street Meeting House, 1813–1814.	Southwest corner 2nd and Market Streets, Philadelphia	
Green Street Meeting House; Home of the North Monthly Meeting until c. 1828			1815-1816	c.1970	"The dimensions of the building were forty-seven by seventy-three feet." Home of the Monthly Meeting for the Northern District until the 1827-28 Hicksite/Orthodox schism. Discontinued as a meeting, 1914. Reopened as Friends Neighborhood House, a settlement house serving immigrant communities.	Southeast corner 4th and Green Streets, Philadelphia	
Key's Alley Meeting House; Home of the North Monthly Meeting, 1790–1816			1790		Dimensions: "68 by 50 feet, … an additional apartment of brick 40 by 45 feet on the north side of the building, for a Monthly Meeting room." Home of the North Meeting until 1816, when it moved to Green Street Meeting House. The former meeting house became a Philadelphia public school.	North side of New Street, between Front and 2nd Streets, Philadelphia	
North Meeting House			1838	c.1968	Built for Orthodox Friends who separated from the Hicksite; Green Street Meeting House. "The dimensions of the building were 118 by 65 feet, with a height of 30 feet." Discontinued as a meeting, 1914. Sold 1918; became a community center and playground.	Southwest corner 6th and Noble Streets, Philadelphia	
Pine Street Meeting House (Hill Meeting House)		1747	1752-1753		Land donated by Samuel Powel. "The meeting agrees that a brick house of 60 feet front, and 43 feet deep shall be built on said lot." A two-story, three-bay brick building, with separate entrances for men and women. Robert Smith, builder	South side of Pine Street, between Front and 2nd Streets, Philadelphia	PAB

== See also ==
- List of Quaker meeting houses
