= Newlin Miller's House =

Historic house in Pennsylvania, United States

- U.S. National Register of Historic Places
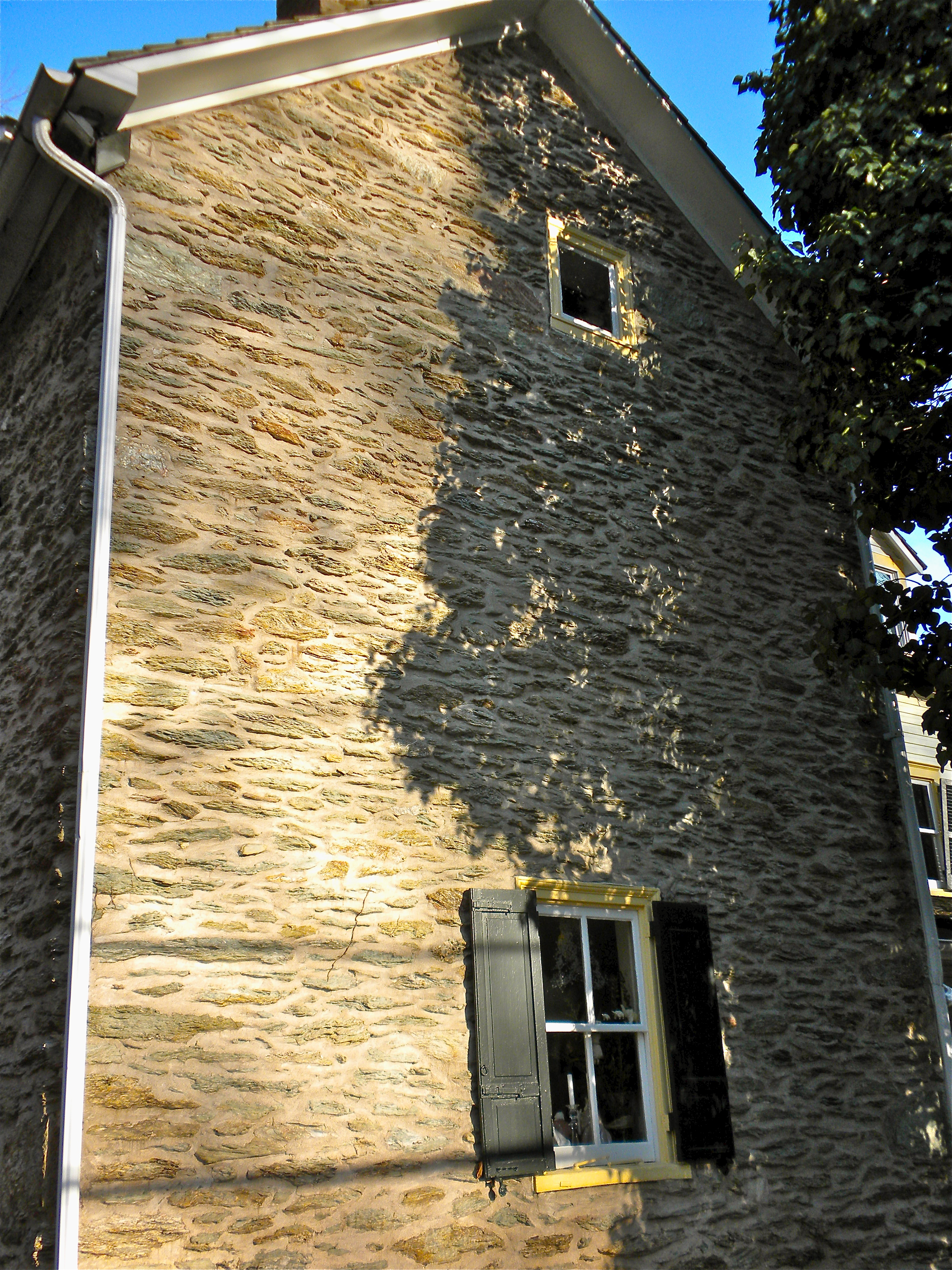

- Location within Pennsylvania Location within the United States
- Location: 1240 Samuel Rd., West Whiteland, Pennsylvania
- Coordinates: 39°59′40″N 75°38′12″W
- Area: 4.7 acres (1.9 ha)
- MPS: West Whiteland Township MRA
- NRHP reference No.: 84003293
- Added to NRHP: September 06, 1984

Newlin Miller's House was built by William Newlin during the early nineteenth century in West Whiteland Township, Chester County, Pennsylvania. It is located in the narrow valley of Little Broad Run, a tributary of the East Branch of Brandywine Creek.

== History and architectural features ==
William Newlin inherited the land from his father, John Newlin, who bought the land in 1788. He built the house and a sawmill, which was described in 1858 as a "frame sawmill with stone foundations driven by an 18-foot overshoot wheel with a 5-foot face."

The house has two stories and is banked into a hill. It is built of "trash stone" and has a frame addition and porch. The sawmill was owned by William Speakman, a local carpenter, from 1876 to 1895. The mill has since been destroyed.

It was listed on the National Register of Historic Places in 1984.

== See also ==
- Concordville, Pennsylvania
- Newlin Mill Complex
- Nicholas Newlin House
