= Merion Friends Meeting House =

Historic church in Pennsylvania, United States

- U.S. National Register of Historic Places
- U.S. National Historic Landmark
- Pennsylvania state historical marker
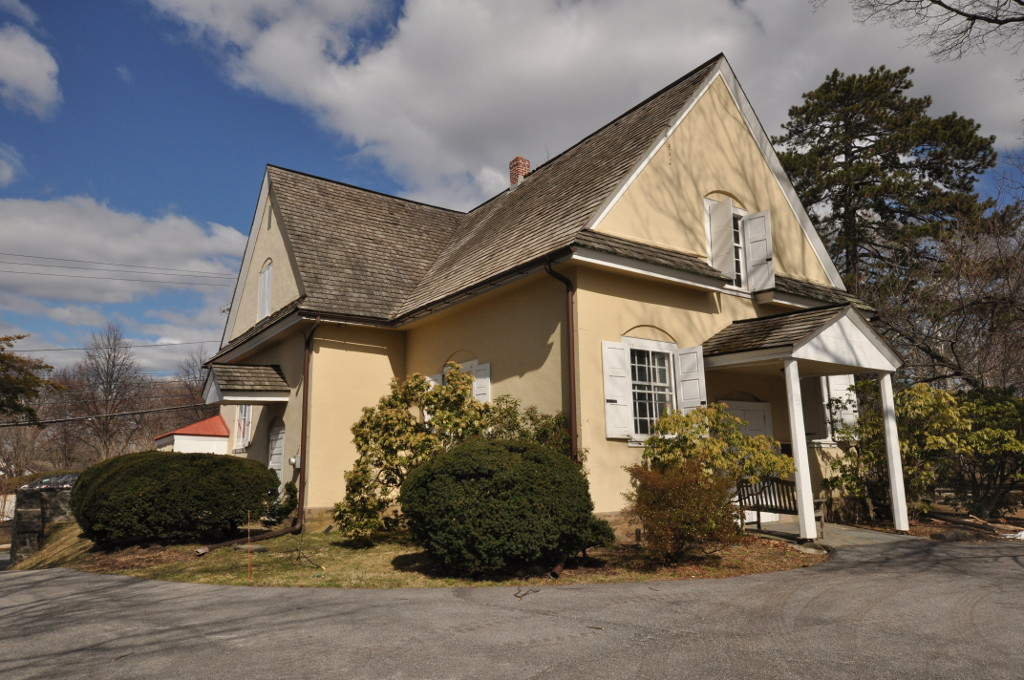
- Merion Friends Meeting House

- Location within Pennsylvania Location within the United States
- Location: 615 Montgomery Ave., Merion Station, Pennsylvania
- Coordinates: 40°0′34″N 75°15′17″W
- Built: 1696–1714
- NRHP reference No.: 98001194

Significant dates
- Added to NRHP: August 5, 1998
- Designated NHL: August 6, 1999
- Designated PHMC: September 15, 1967

The Merion Friends Meeting House is an active and historic Quaker meeting house at 615 Montgomery Avenue in Merion Station, Pennsylvania. Completed about 1715, it is the second oldest Friends meeting house in the United States (after the Third Haven Meeting House in Maryland), with distinctively Welsh architectural features that distinguish it from later meeting houses. It is home to the Merion monthly meeting. The meeting house was declared a National Historic Landmark in 1999.

== Description and history ==
The Merion Friends Meeting House is located in the village of Merion Station, a neighborhood in Lower Merion Township, on the north side of Montgomery Avenue and Haverford Avenue. It is a 1-1/2-story structure, built out of locally quarried stone covered in plaster. It is laid out in a T shape, and is covered by a cross-gabled roof. Its main facade is three bays wide, with a center entrance sheltered by a gabled porch. The flanking windows, as well as that in the gable above are topped by segmented-arch lintels. The front gable and both side gables have pent roof sections. The principal rafters supporting the roof are bent, a unique adaptation of a medieval Welsh construction technique to the building. The property also includes a burial ground, estimated to have more than 2,000 burials (many of which are unmarked in accordance with early Quaker custom).

The meeting was founded by the first known group of Welsh settlers in the Americas, who arrived in 1682. Construction of the meeting house was begun in about 1695, and was completed around 1715. The building does not follow what are now considered standard norms for Quaker meeting houses. Prior to the English Toleration Act 1688, which allowed Quakers to worship openly and freely in England and its colonies, Quakers traditionally met either in the open, or in houses or barns, and had no settled architecture to satisfy the organizational needs of their congregations, which call for sex-segregated business meetings. The Welsh-infused architecture of this building stands as a memorial to the early experimental period of meeting house design. William Penn preached in the meeting house.

Merion Friends Meeting remains an active Quaker worship community.

== See also ==
- List of the oldest buildings in Pennsylvania
- Friends meeting houses in Pennsylvania
- List of National Historic Landmarks in Pennsylvania
- National Register of Historic Places listings in Montgomery County, Pennsylvania
