= Concordville Historic District =

Historic district in Pennsylvania, United States

- U.S. National Register of Historic Places
- U.S. Historic district
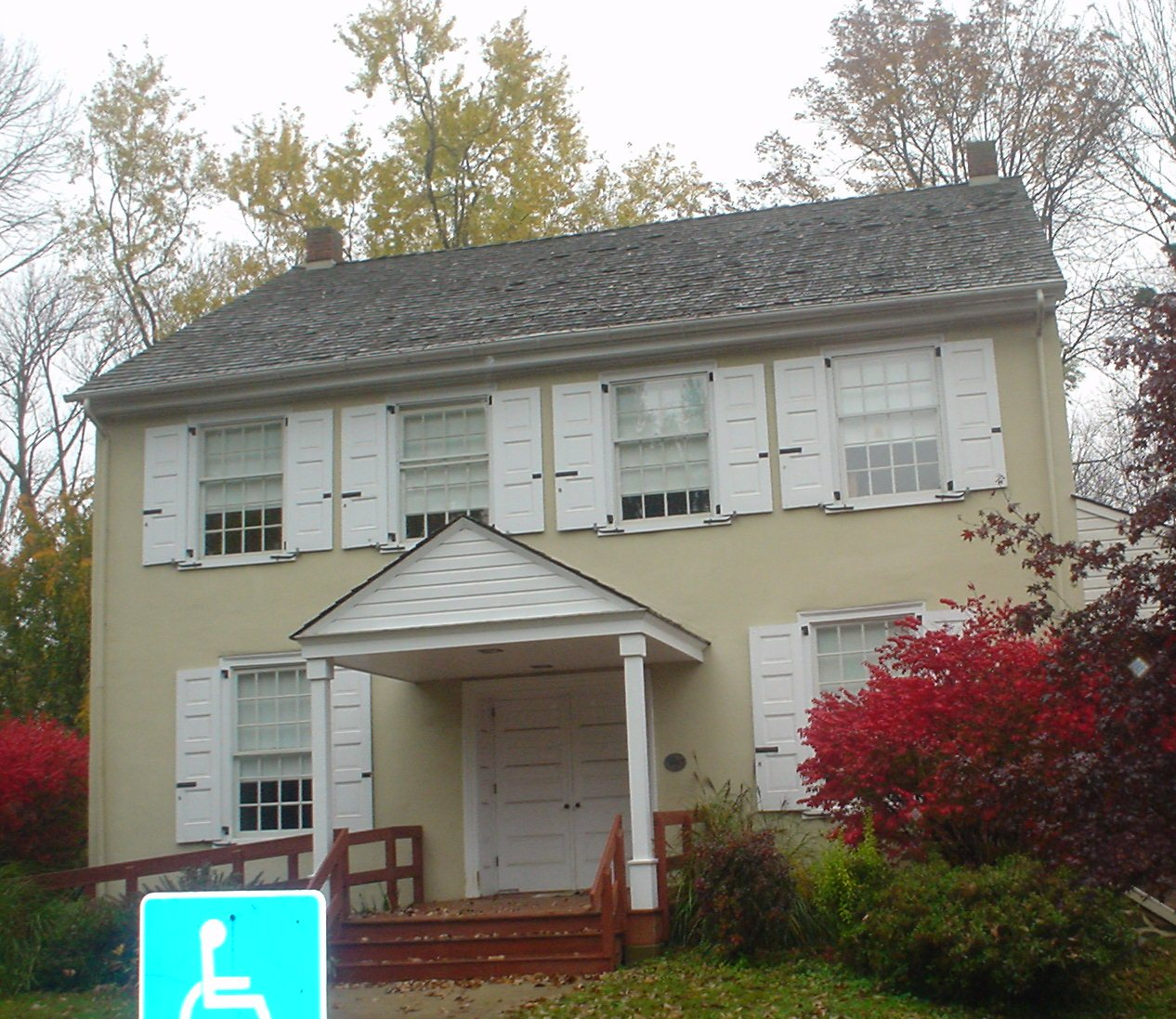
- Concord Orthodox Meeting, October 2009

- Location within Pennsylvania Location within the United States
- Location: Concord Rd. and Baltimore Pike, Concordville, Pennsylvania
- Coordinates: 39°53′09″N 75°31′15″W
- Area: 14 acres (5.7 ha)
- Built: 1728
- NRHP reference No.: 73001624
- Added to NRHP: April 3, 1973

Concordville Historic District is a national historic district located at Concordville, Delaware County, Pennsylvania. The district includes six contributing buildings in Concordville. Four of the buildings are the Newlin Tenant House, Concord Orthodox Meeting, Samuel Trimble House, and 1856 Brick House. The two remaining buildings are separately listed on the National Register; the Concord Friends Meetinghouse and Nicholas Newlin House.

It was added to the National Register of Historic Places in 1973.
