= Newlin Mill Complex =

- U.S. National Register of Historic Places
- Pennsylvania state historical marker
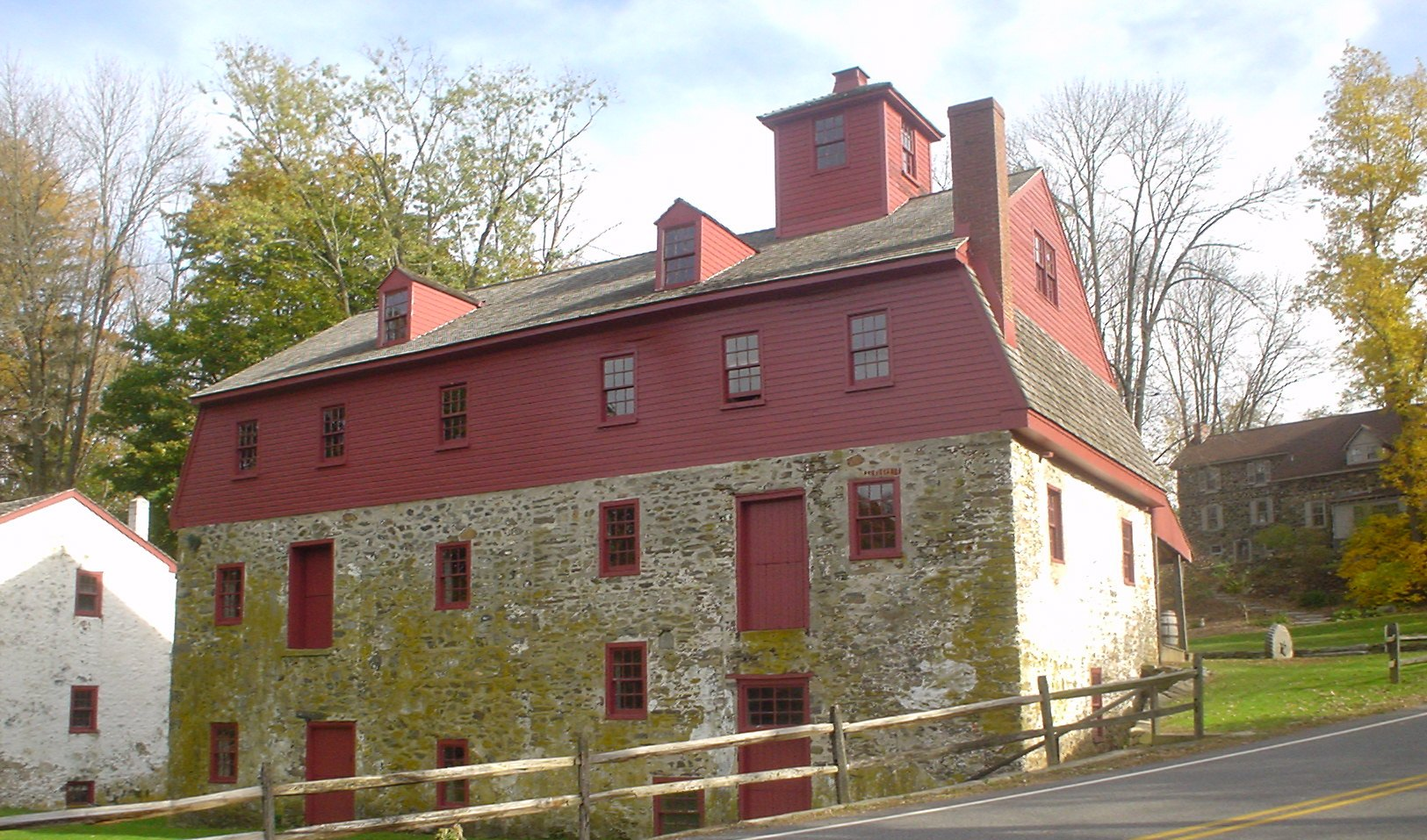
- North side of the mill building Logo

- Location within Pennsylvania Location within the United States
- Location: U.S. 1 and Cheyney Road, Glen Mills, Pennsylvania
- Coordinates: 39°53′25″N 75°30′22″W
- Built: 1704
- NRHP reference No.: 83002240

Significant dates
- Added to NRHP: March 9, 1983
- Designated PHMC: May 05, 1959

The Newlin Mill Complex, also referred to as The Newlin Grist Mill, is a water-powered gristmill on the west branch of Chester Creek near Concordville, Pennsylvania built in 1704 by Nathaniel and Mary Newlin and operated commercially until 1941. During its three centuries of operation, the mill has been known as the Lower Mill, the Markham Mill, the Seventeen-O-Four Mill and the Concord Flour Mill. In 1958 the mill property was bought by E. Mortimer Newlin, restored and given to the Nicholas Newlin Foundation to use as a historical park. Water power is still used to grind corn meal which is sold on site. The park includes five historical buildings, which were added to the National Register of Historic Places in 1983, and 150 acres (61 ha) of natural woodland.

== History (1683-1739) ==
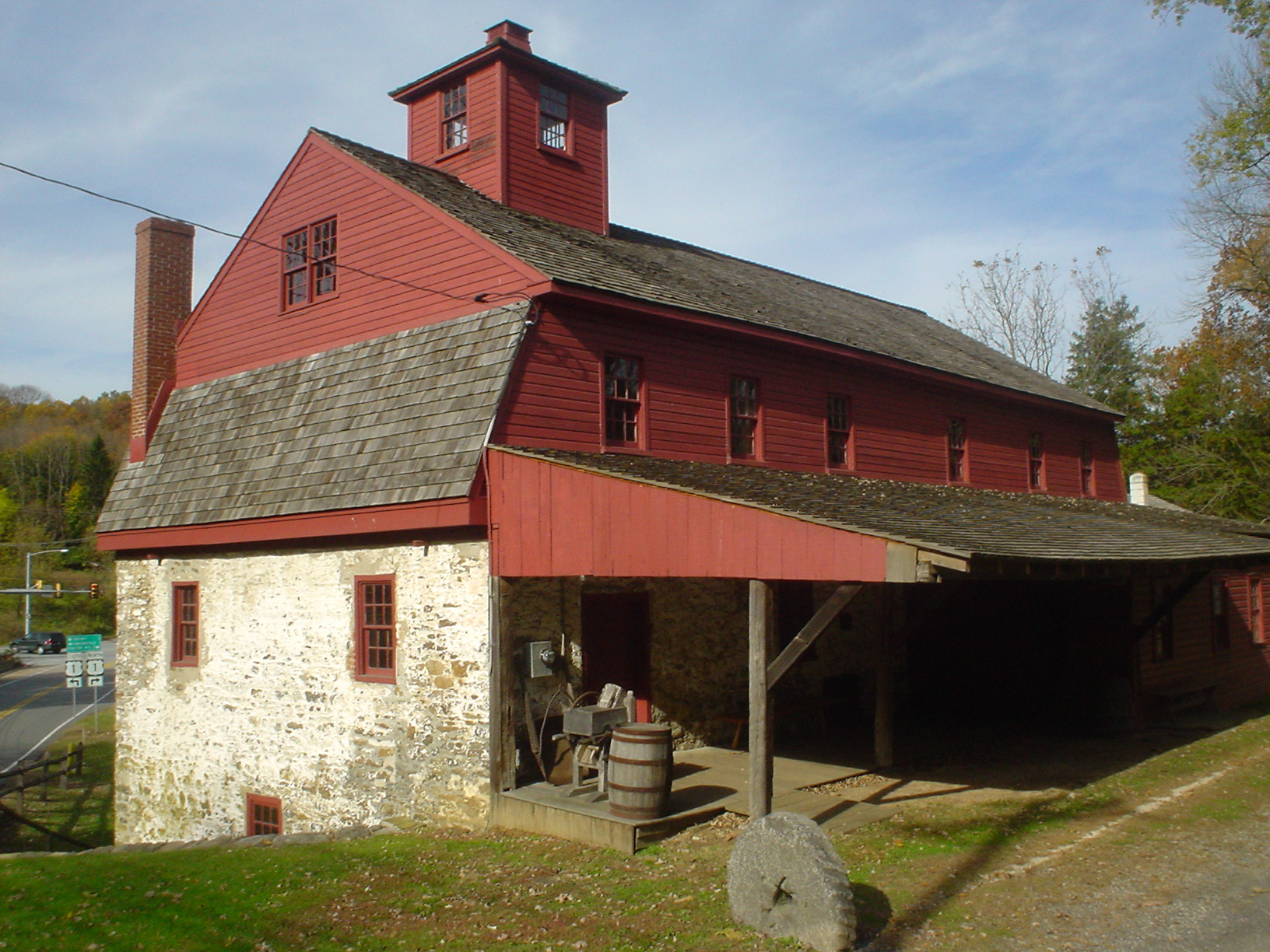
Southwest view of the mill

Nicholas Newlin was a member of the Religious Society of Friends and an Irishman who lived in the Quaker town of Mountmellick, in Queens County, Ireland. In May, 1683, Newlin, fleeing religious persecution, emigrated to Pennsylvania with his wife, Elizabeth, and three children: Nathaniel, Rachel, and John, on the ship Levee from Liverpool. In October, 1683 purchased the mill property from William Penn in Concord Township, about ten miles (16 km) northwest of the town of Chester.

Newlin was a prominent citizen, serving on the province's governing body, the Provincial Council in 1686 and 1687, as a Justice of the Peace, and on the Courts of Chester County.

Newlin's son, Nathaniel, married Mary Mendenhall in 1684. In 1685, Mary Mendenhall received additional land as part of a grant to her and her siblings.

Nathaniel and Mary Mendenhall built the present mill, the third gristmill in the township, in 1704. Nathaniel also served as a Justice of the Peace, and on the Courts of Chester County, and served in the Provincial Assembly from 1698 to 1722. Through Nathaniel's inheritance from his father, and the land Mary Mendenhall held, and by their purchase of 7,750 acres (3,140 ha) that became Newlin Township, they became together one of the largest landowners in Chester County. When Nathaniel Newlin died intestate in 1729, shortly after Mary Mendenhall died, the land was divided under Pennsylvania law among their children with the oldest son, Nicholas, receiving a double portion, and all the daughters and other sons, including a son named Nathaniel Newlin, each a single portion.

== History (1739-pres.) ==
In 1739, Nathaniel's grandson via his son Nathaniel, Nathaniel Newlin III, built a house for the head miller. In 1742, William and Anne Trimble, the owners of a neighboring gristmill, built a house overlooking the Newlin mill. A mile to the west in the village of Concordville, Nathaniel's son Nicholas built the Nicholas Newlin House in 1742; which is listed separately on the National Register of Historic Places. In 1777, the Battle of Brandywine was fought within a few miles of the mill. General George Washington had ordered the removal of millstones from nearby mills to hinder the supply of British troops, but there are no records of the order's effect on Newlin Mill.

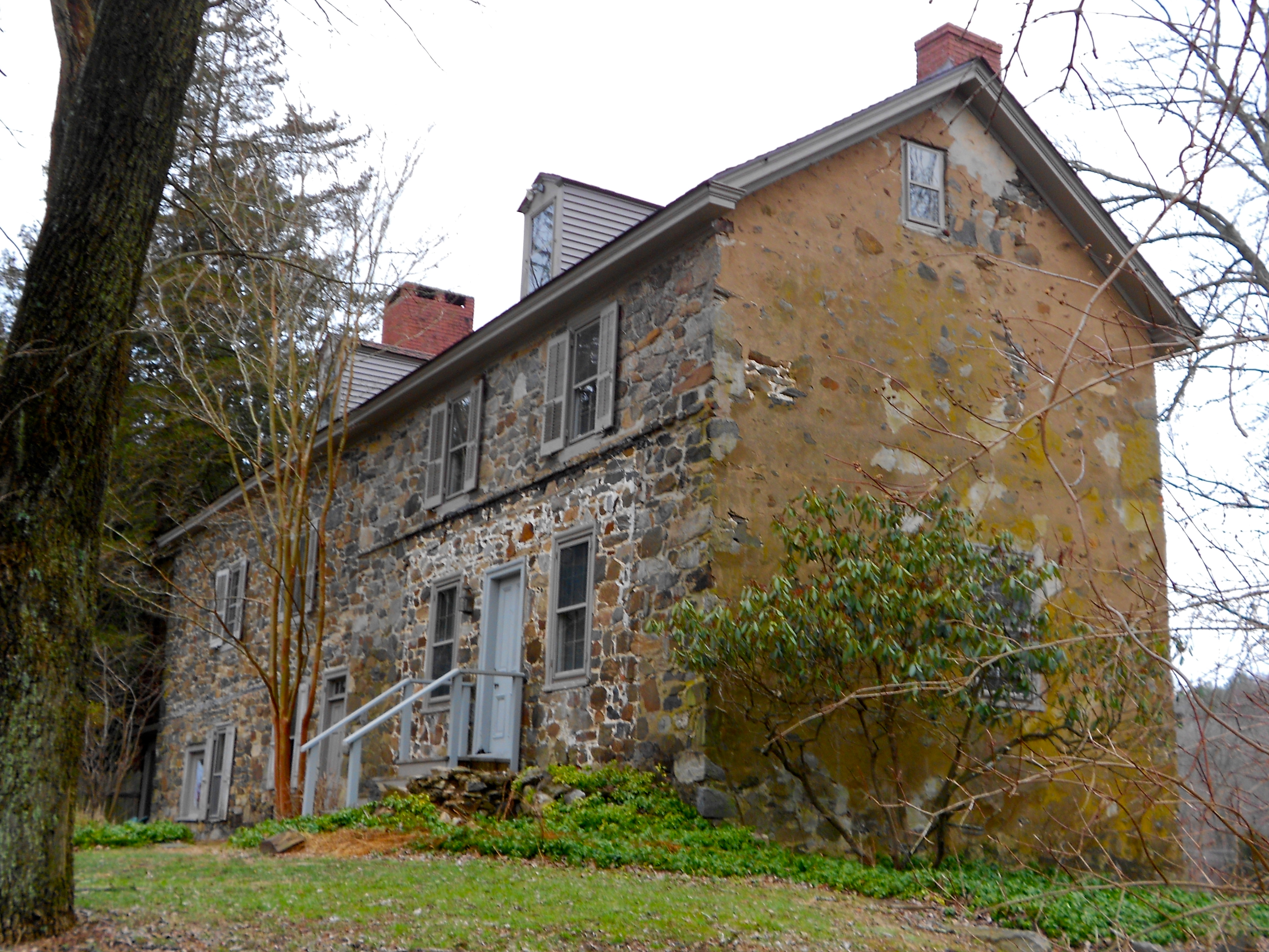
Trimble House

Southeastern Pennsylvania was the leading producer of grain in the colonial period and mills could be easily powered by the steep descent of the streams, called the Fall Line, in the area. By 1781 there were 127 gristmills in Chester County, which then included present-day Delaware County. The Newlin mill only served local and domestic needs and was known as a "country mill", rather than a "merchant mill" which would produce finer flour for urban and export markets.

The Newlin family owned the mill until 1817, selling to William Trimble, Jr. Thomas Newlin, who died in 1811, had remarried after his wife's death. Disagreements between his two sets of children resulted in a judgment of $11,326.30 against his estate, forcing the sale of the mill.

The Philadelphia and Baltimore Central Railroad was built through the property in 1859; this allowed the mill to market its flour in Philadelphia and Baltimore. A railway station was built in 1868 and Samuel Hill bought the mill in 1869. In 1942 the mill stopped commercial production and the buildings were used temporarily as a bookstore and an antique store. In 1956, Nicholas's eighth-generation descendant, E. Mortimer Newlin, purchased the property and later formed the Nicholas Newlin Foundation to restore and preserve the mill. Restorations were completed in 1962, and 1992.

Ownership of Mill Site
Ownership dates	Owner (lifespan)	
Sep 24, 1683-1685	Nicholas Newlin (1630–1699)	Bought 500 acres (202 ha) from William Penn
Apr 17, 1685-1729	Nathaniel Newlin (1663–1729)	Given 250 acres (101 ha) as a wedding present Built mill 1704
1729-1768	Nicholas Newlin (1689–1768)	Inherited land and mill from his father
1768-1811	Thomas Newlin (1747–1811)	Inherited land and mill from his father
1811-1817	Benjamin Newlin (1784–1873)	Inherited land and mill from his father Sold land to pay for inheritance lawsuit
Jul 31, 1817-1829	William Trimble (1766–1842)	Bought 26 acres (11 ha), mill and 2 houses for $9,005
1829-1835	Abraham Sharpless (1748–1835)	Bought 26 acres (11 ha), mill and 2 houses for $5,500
1835-1869	Casper Sharpless (1805–1865)	Inherited land and mill from his father Mill unsold for 4 years after his death
Apr 21, 1869-1880	John H. Hill (1799–1880)	Relative of the Newlins; Bought mill and land for $25,500
1880-1929	Samuel Newlin Hill (1842–1929)	Inherited land and mill from his father
1929-1942	William W. Hill (1863–1943)	Inherited land and mill from his father Active mill operation ceased 1942
Oct 27, 1942-1956	Daniel I. Conlon	Intended to convert to a residence
Mar 2, 1956-1960	E. Mortimer Newlin (1898–1977)	7th-generation descendant of Nathaniel Newlin; First purchase included mill, warehouse, miller's house and 3.5 acres (1.4 ha)
Dec 2, 1960–present	Nicholas Newlin Foundation	Founded by E. Mortimer Newlin to preserve the mill
From Nicholas Sellers, Short History of Newlin Grist Mill, p. 22.

== Buildings ==
=== Mill ===
The mill measures 35 feet (11 m) wide by 70 feet (21 m) long. A date stone on an exterior wall is marked "Nathan'l Mary Newlin 1704." The dam and the half-mile mill race, which provides the water that powers the mill, were built the same year. The original grindstone was imported from France. The mill was built of fieldstone into a hillside: the north side two stories, the south side one story high. The mill wheel was originally outside the mill and was probably breastshot. It was reconstructed in 1976, weighs 1,500 pounds (680 kg) and measures 16 by 4 feet (4.9 by 1.2 m), with 52 buckets. The water exits underground through the tail race and travels about 150 yards (140 m) back to Chester Creek. The floors and mill machinery are supported by a hurst frame, an inner timber frame that is separated from the outer stone walls so that vibrations do not break the outer walls. The process of grinding the corn may be viewed at the mill.

Sometime after 1817 William Trimble expanded the mill and enclosed the mill wheel. It ground about 60,000 bushels of corn per year at that time. Sometime before 1850 the mill was refitted according to the Oliver Evans automated mill design and began to grind wheat flour. In 1850 owner Casper Sharpless purchased 20,000 bushels of wheat for $22,000 and sold flour worth $30,000.

In 1870 the following products were produced:

1870 production
Products	Amount purchased	Purchase cost	Milled product	Amount produced	Gross revenue
wheat	25,000 bu.	$31,250	flour	5,000 bu.	$35,000
corn	25,000 bu.	$22,500	meal	750 tons	$25,000
other	1,000 bu.	$600	meal	35 tons	$1,600
plaster	225 tons	$1,575	plaster	225 tons	$2,000
From Nicholas Sellers, Short History of Newlin Grist Mill, p. 37. Data from the Federal Manufacturing Census of 1870.

At that time the mill had four millstones and two wooden overshot water wheels with a 24-foot (7.3 m) fall, producing about 20 horsepower (15 kW). A wood-framed upper story was added about 1890.

=== Warehouse ===
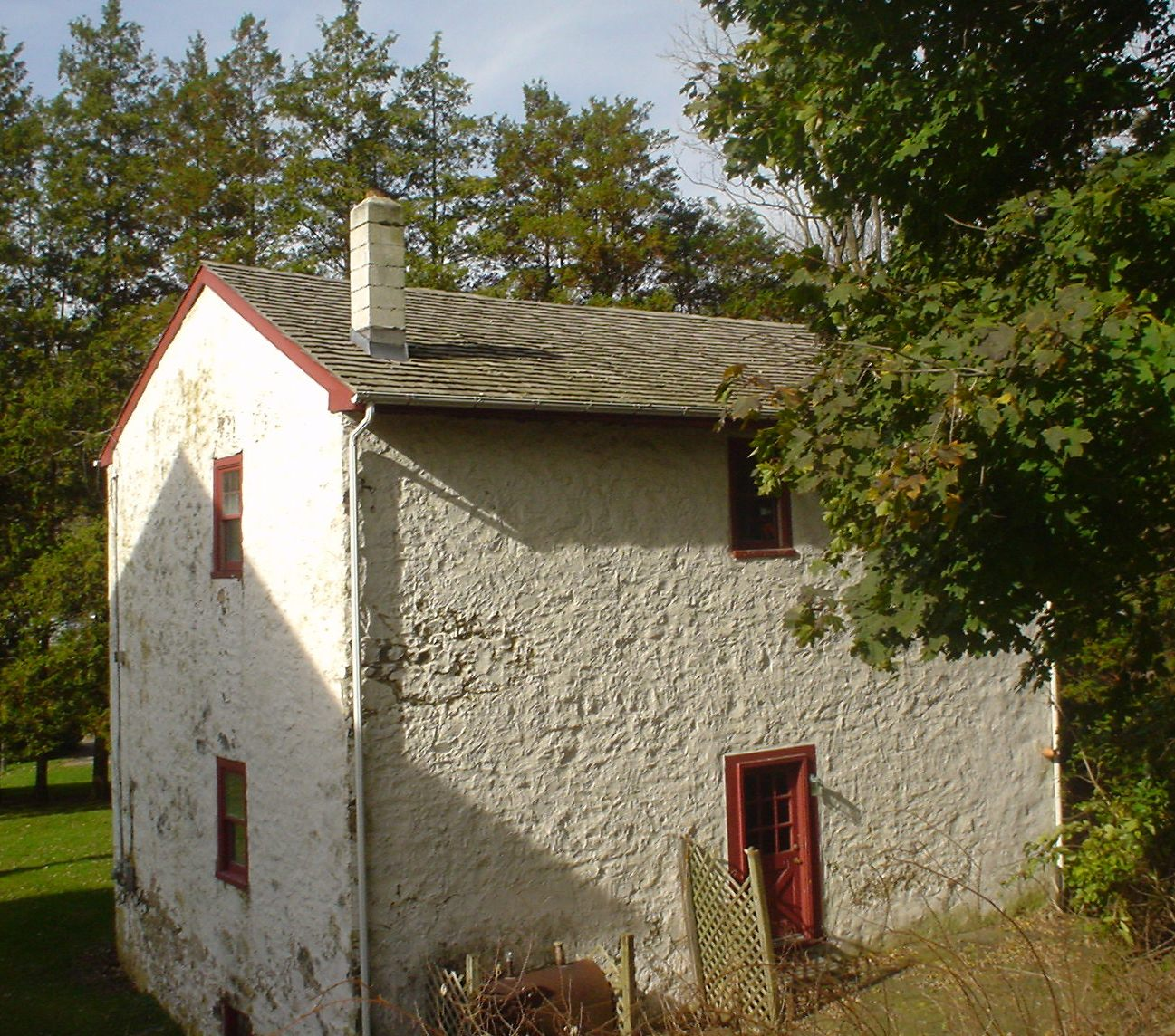
Warehouse

The warehouse is a 2 1/2-story stone building to the east of the lower level of the mill. It was built by Nathaniel Newlin after he built the mill to use as a dry goods store. It now serves as the Foundation's archive.

=== Miller's house ===
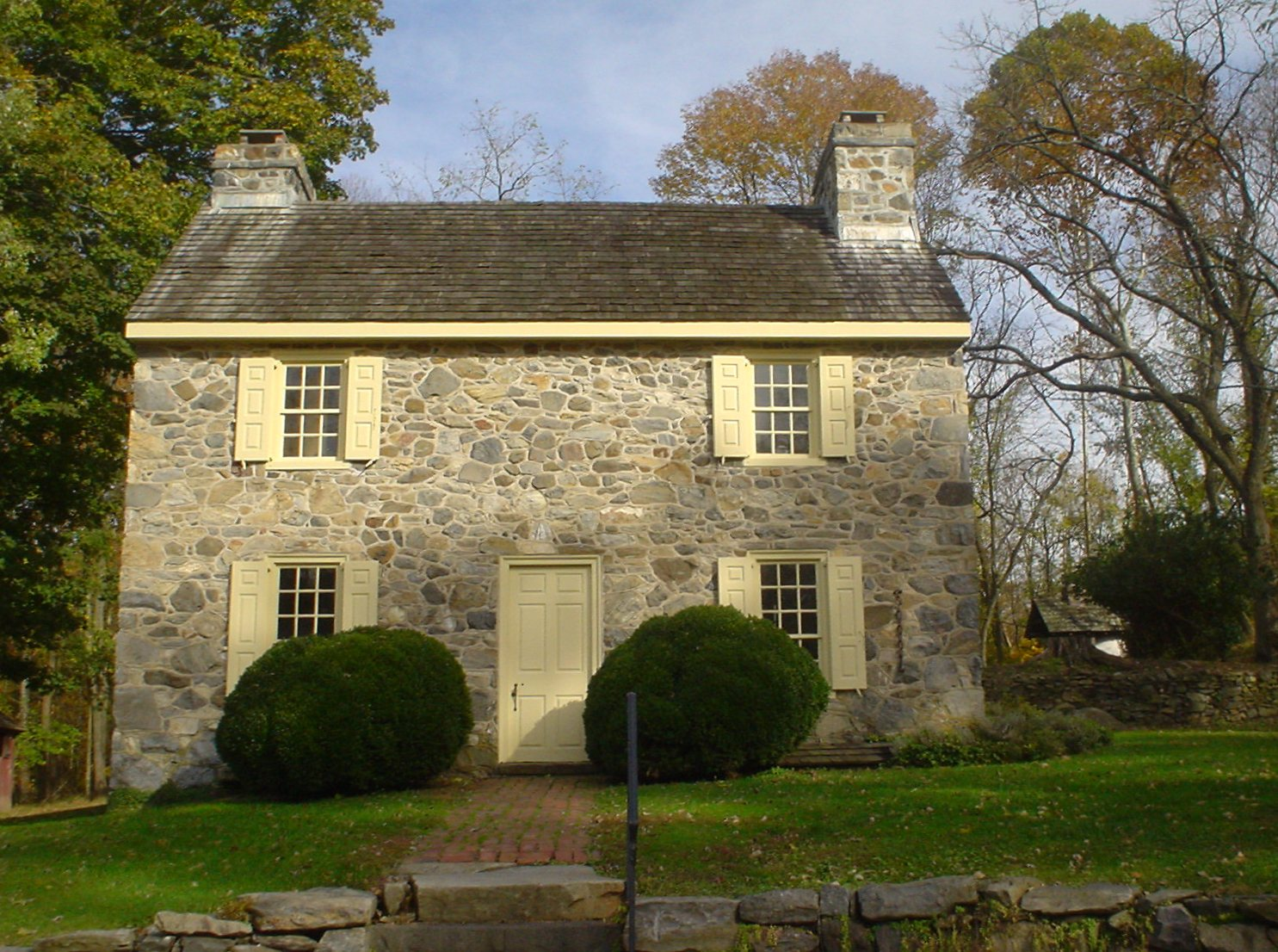
Miller's house

Built in 1739 of stone, it is adjacent to the south side of the mill. There are two rooms on each of the two floors, with a fireplace in each room, and a beehive oven attached to the kitchen. A third story was added about 1860 and removed during a restoration in the 1960s. This house should not be confused with the Newlin Miller's House about 12 miles (19 km) north in West Whiteland Township which was built in the early 19th century by William Newlin and listed separately in the National Register of Historic Places.

=== Trimble House ===
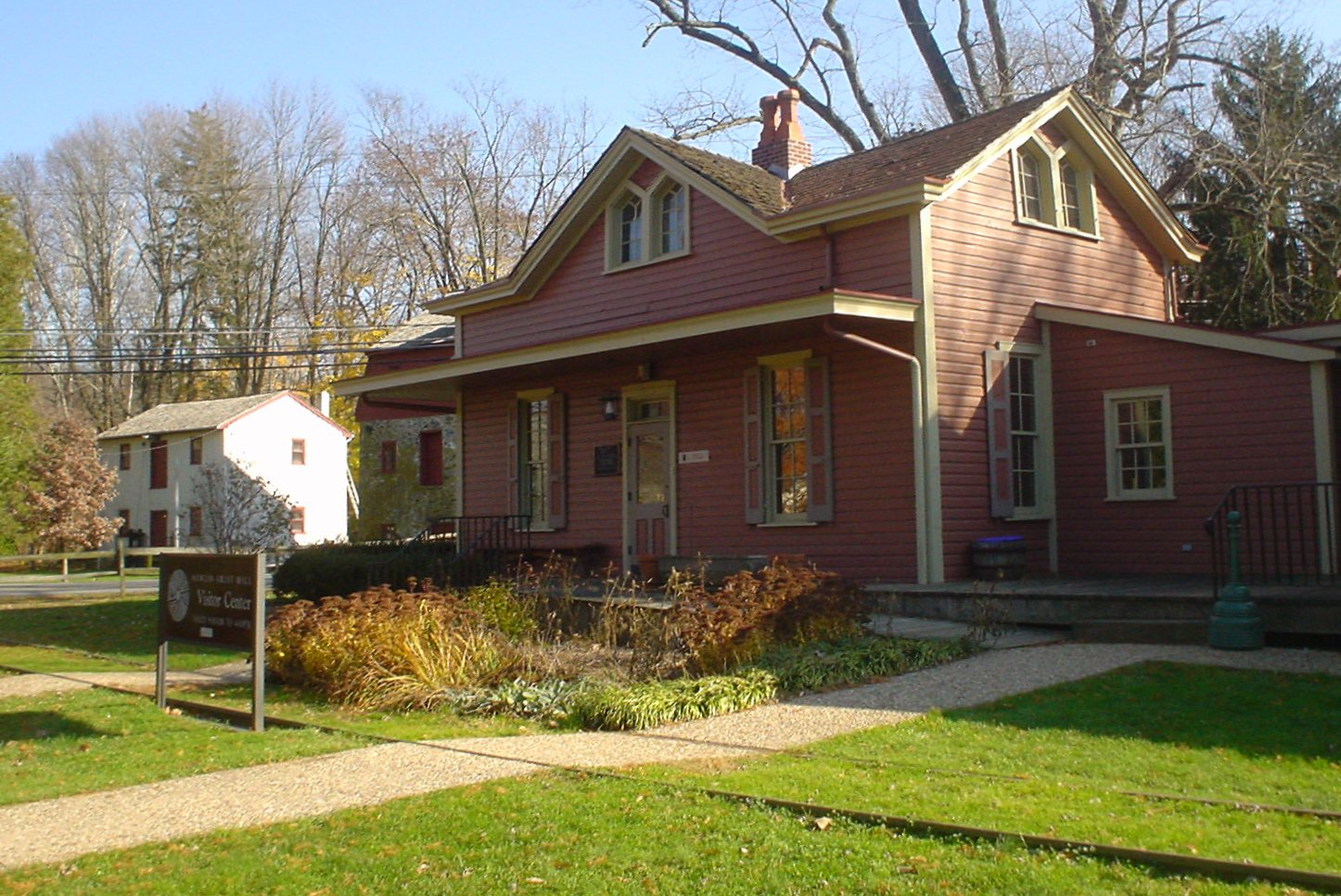
Old railway station

(The image shown is of the main office, and not the Trimble House.) This house was built into the hill above the mill and the miller's house in 1742, also with four rooms. It was expanded by 1765 to accommodate William Trimble's growing family. It has nine fireplaces, a 53 foot (16 m) deep well and much of the original flooring, woodwork, doors, and hardware. The Newlin Foundation bought the house in 1998 and it is used as a private residence.

=== Railway station ===
The 1 1/2-story Gothic-style station was originally built in 1868–1869 by Samuel Hill. It served as a post office and polling station for the community of mill workers in the area. It burned down in 1890 and was rebuilt the next year, serving as a railway station until the 1930s. It is used now as the park office.

=== Park ===
The five original buildings form the core of a 150 acres (61 ha) park, which is mostly natural woodlands. A 1710 springhouse from a local farm was moved to the park in the 1970s and a small barn was moved from northern Delaware to the area behind the miller's house. In 1965 a log cabin was constructed, which is used for meetings, receptions, and parties. A new 18th Century style blacksmith shop replica was constructed in 1975. Two ball fields are also included in the park.

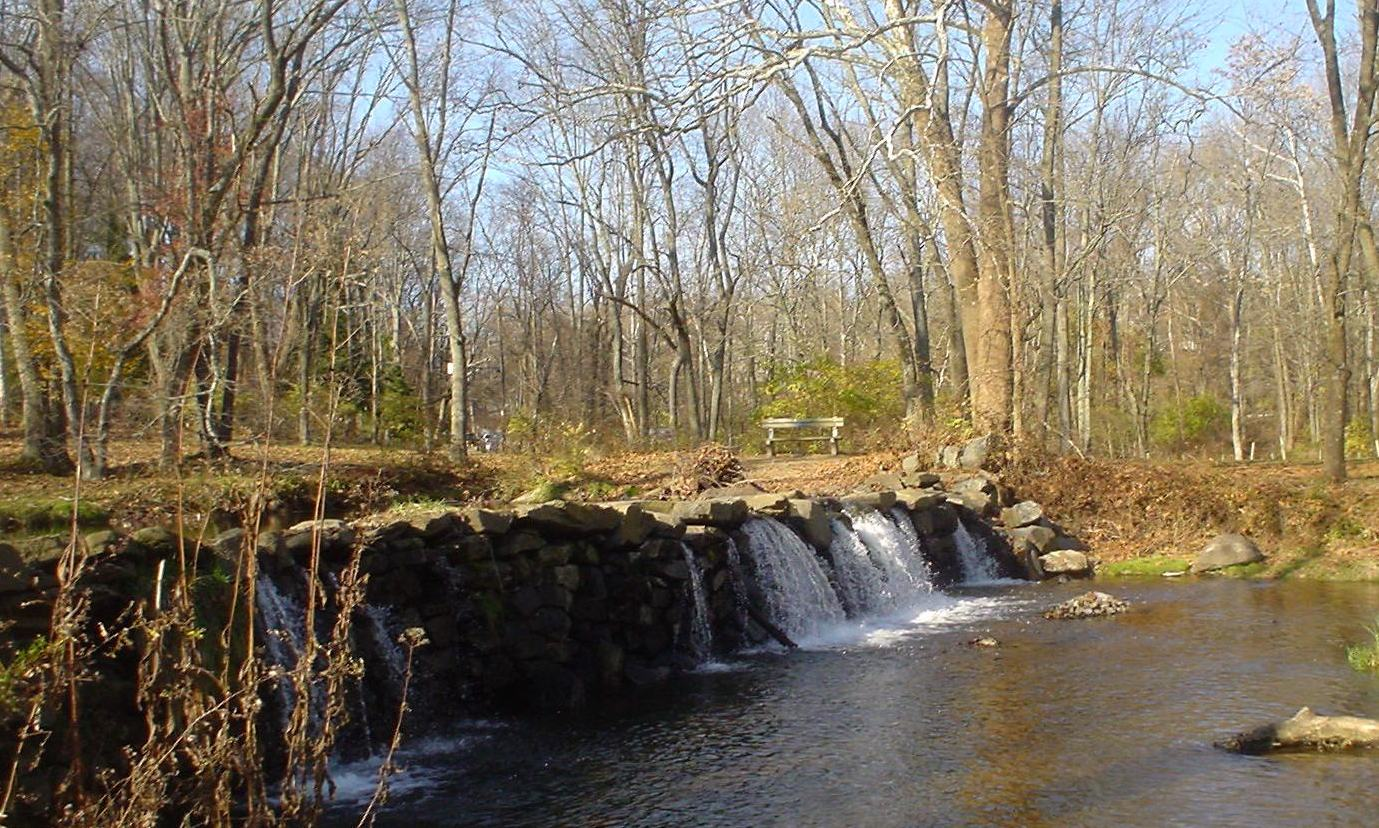
The "Black Dam," built 1704

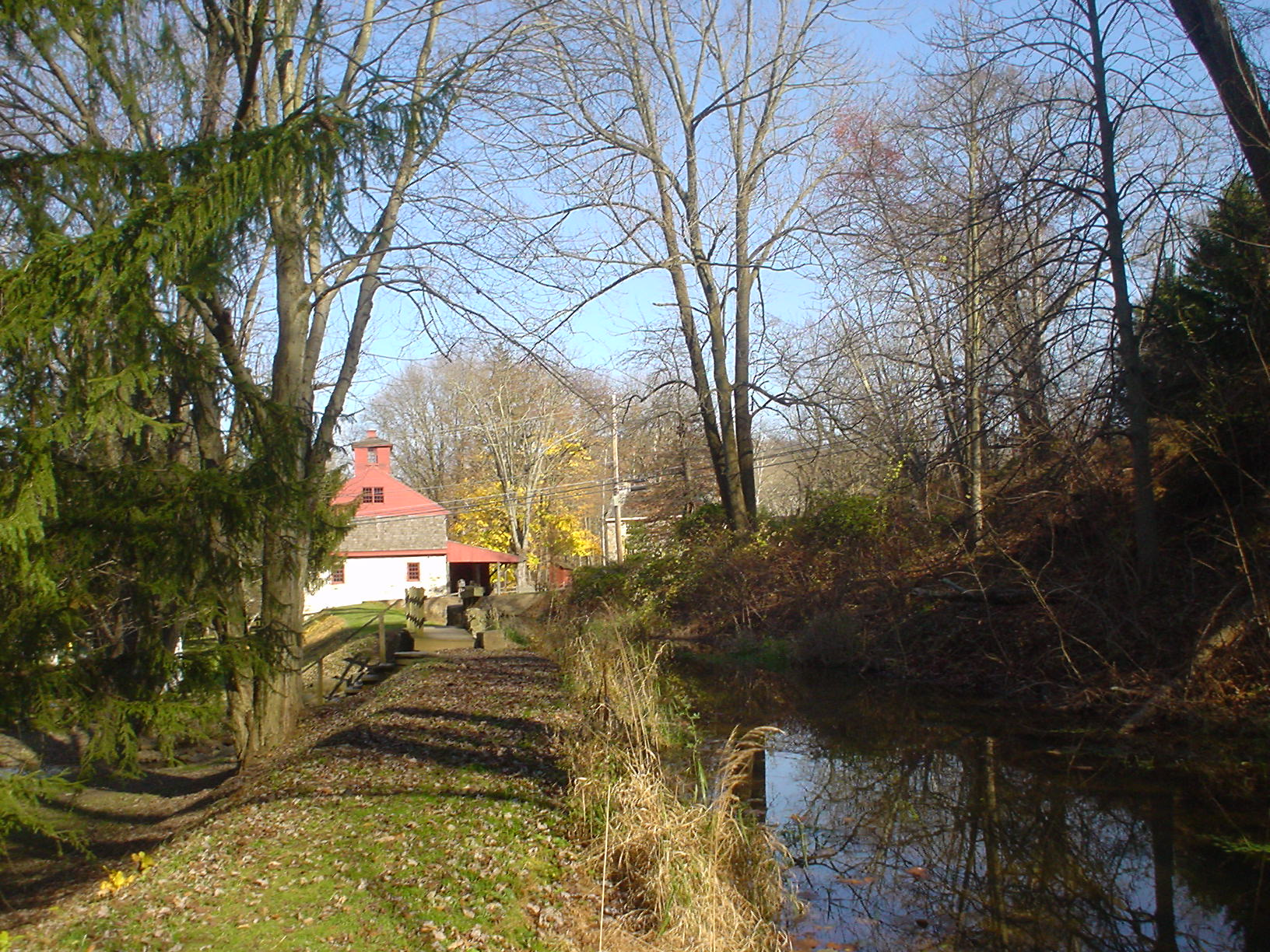
Mill race takes water from the dam to the mill

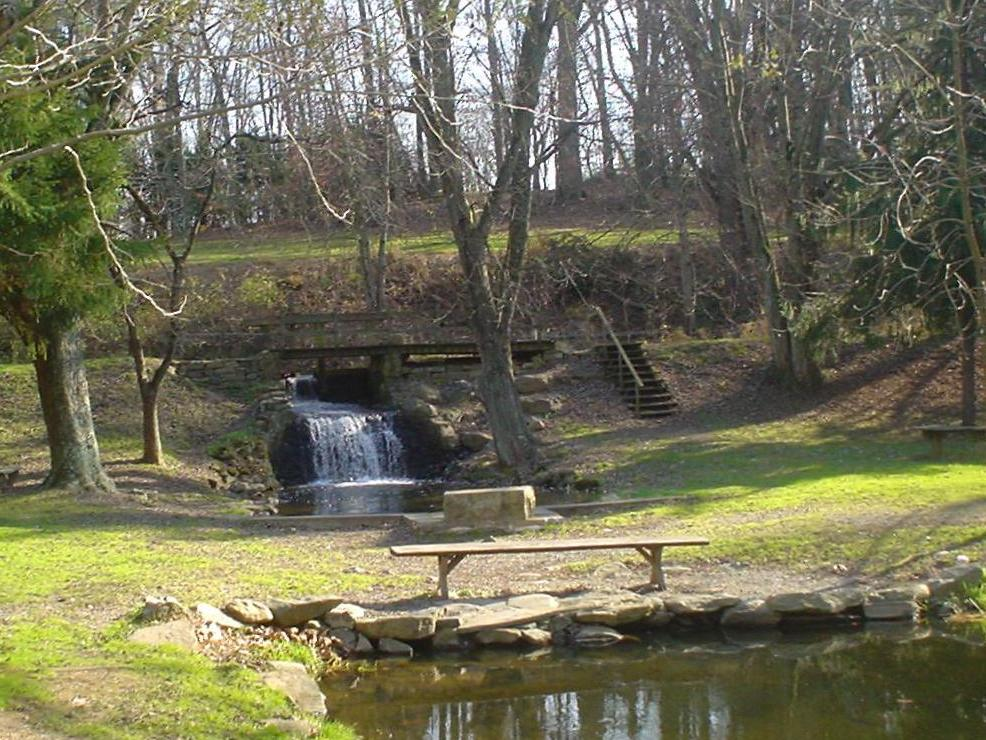
Spillway regulates waterflow

== Sources ==
Wallace, Antony F. C., "The Mystique of Old Mills", Ch. 1 in Place, Memory and Time, Essays Commemorating The Tricentenial of the Nathaniel Newlin Grist Mill, 1704–2004. Nicholas Newlin Press. 2004. ISBN 1-59880-143-0.

Sellers, Nicholas, "Short History of Newlin Grist Mill", Ch. 2 in Place, Memory and Time, Essays Commemorating The Tricentenial of the Nathaniel Newlin Grist Mill, 1704–2004. Nicholas Newlin Press. 2004. ISBN 1-59880-143-0.
