= Schuylkill Friends Meeting House =

Church in Pennsylvania, US

Coordinates: 40°7′15.57″N 75°30′6.74″W

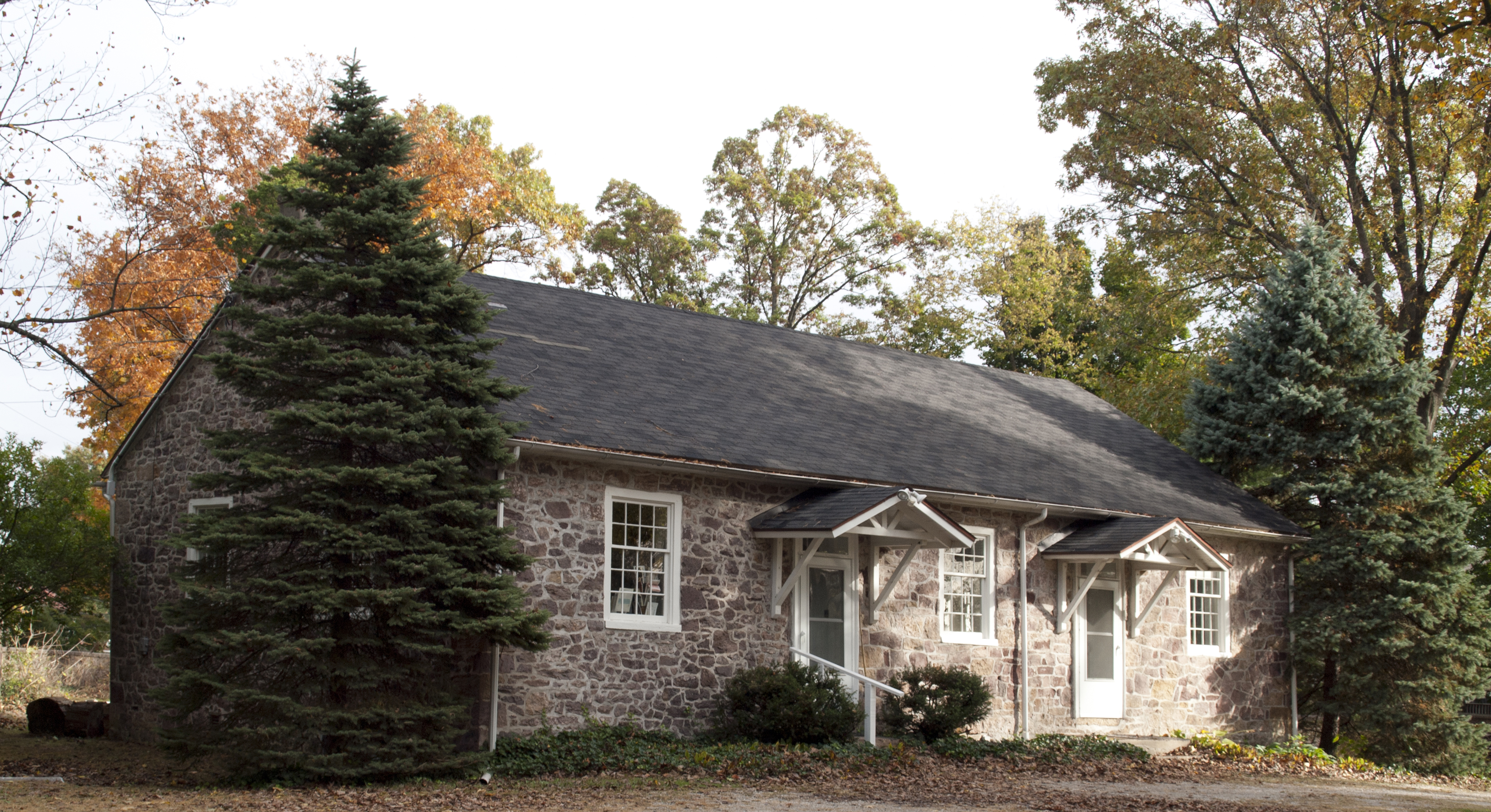
Schuylkill Friends Meeting House

Schuylkill Friends Meeting House is a Quaker meeting house located on North Whitehorse Road in the Schuylkill Township section of Chester County, Pennsylvania, in the United States. This Meeting House is 2.5 miles west of the Valley Forge Post Office.

Originally Charlestown Friends Meeting, the name was changed in 1826 when Charlestown Township was split.

Chester County Archive road dockets indicate there was a Meeting House in 1802, "road leading from the White Horse to Charlestown Meeting House". The east (Worship) room was completed in 1816.

Schuylkill Friends Meeting for Worship is every Sunday at 10:00 am. It is part of the Caln Quarterly Meeting of the Philadelphia Yearly Meeting of the Religious Society of Friends.

== See also ==
- List of Quaker meeting houses
- Friends meeting houses in Pennsylvania
