= Concord Friends Meetinghouse =

Historic church in Pennsylvania, United States

- U.S. National Register of Historic Places
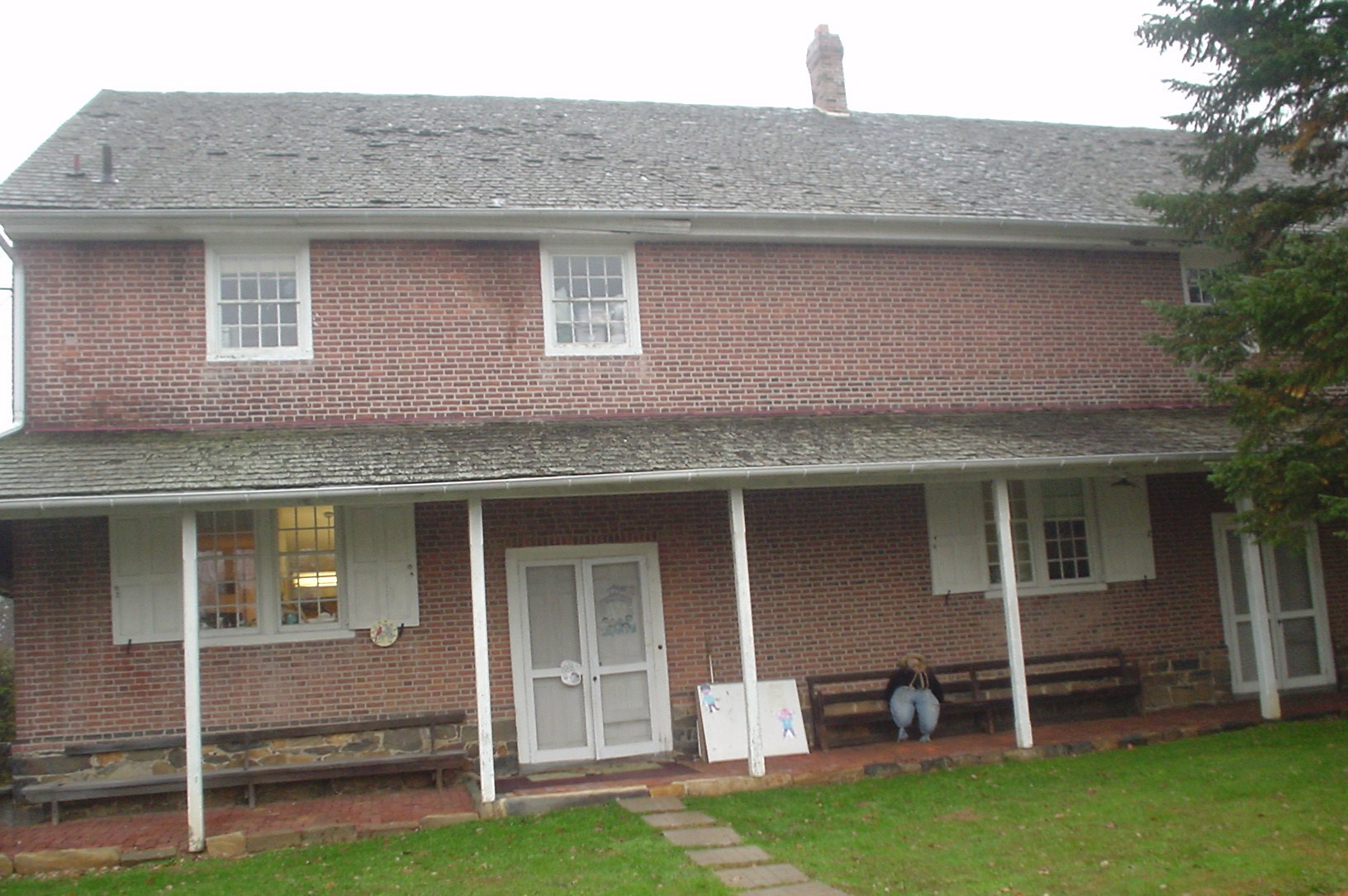
- Concord Friends Meetinghouse, October 2009

- Location within Pennsylvania Location within the United States
- Location: Old Concord Rd., Concordville, Pennsylvania
- Coordinates: 39°53′7″N 75°31′13″W
- Area: 3 acres (1.2 ha)
- Built: 1728
- NRHP reference No.: 77001164
- Added to NRHP: June 17, 1977

Concord Friends Meetinghouse is a historic meeting house on Old Concord Road in Concordville, Delaware County, Pennsylvania. The meeting was first organized sometime before 1697, as the sixth Quaker meeting in what was then Chester County. In 1697 the meeting leased its current location for "one peppercorn yearly forever" from John Mendenhall. A log structure was built in 1710. The current brick edifice structure was built in 1728. After a fire which completely destroyed the interior, the meetinghouse was rebuilt and enlarged in 1788. During the Battle of Brandywine on September 11, 1777, which was fought a few miles to the west, wounded American soldiers took refuge in the meetinghouse.

It was added to the National Register of Historic Places in 1977. It is located in the Concordville Historic District.
