= Nicholas Newlin House =

Historic house in Pennsylvania, United States

- U.S. National Register of Historic Places
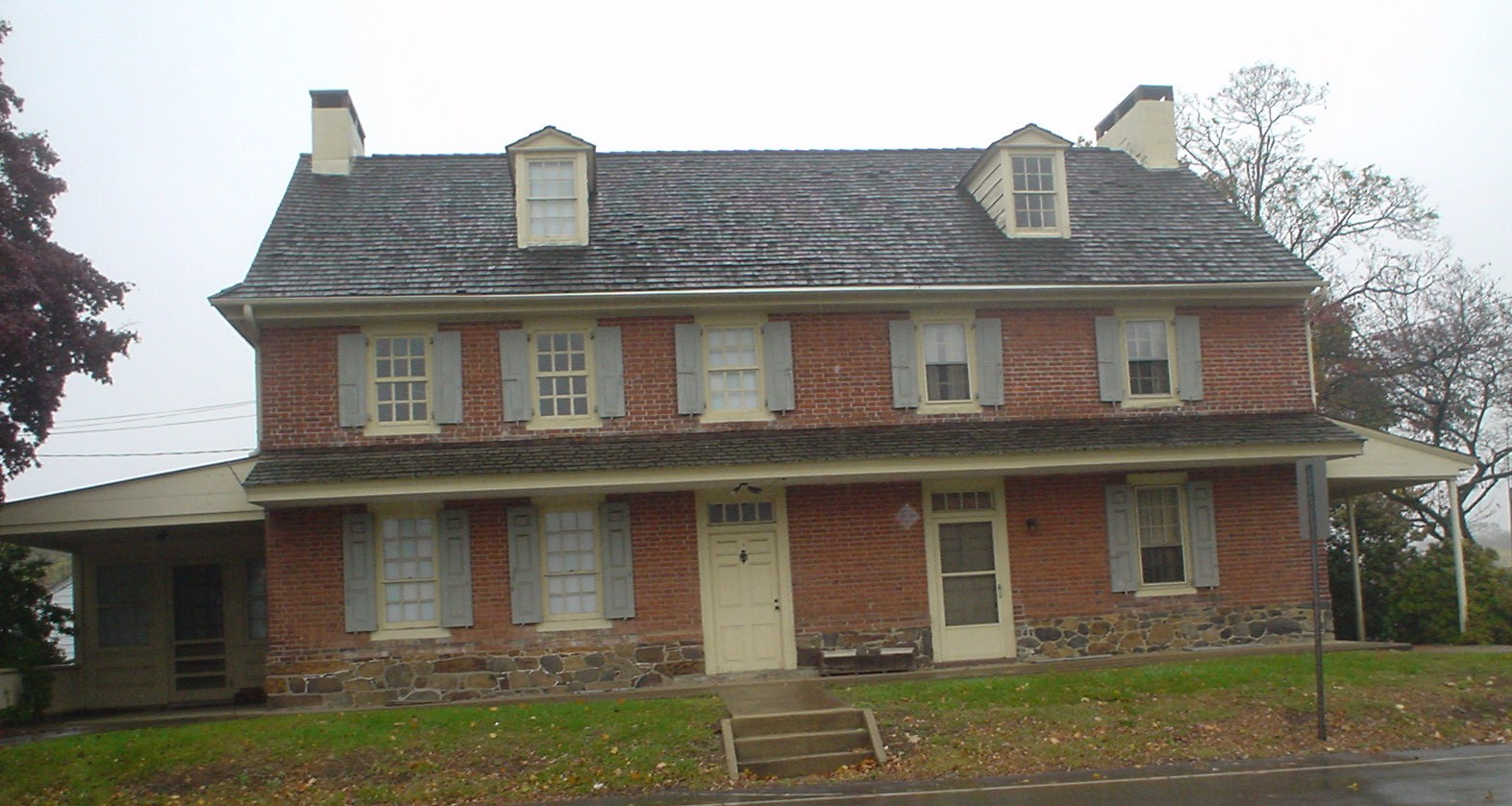
- Nicholas Newlin House, October 2009

- Location within Pennsylvania Location within the United States
- Location: Concord Rd., Concordville, Pennsylvania
- Coordinates: 39°53′10″N 75°31′19″W
- Area: 2 acres (0.81 ha)
- Built: 1742
- NRHP reference No.: 72001118
- Added to NRHP: April 26, 1972

The Nicholas Newlin House was built in 1742 in Concordville, Delaware County, Pennsylvania by Nicholas Newlin. Located roughly a mile west of the Newlin Mill Complex, it is located in the Concordville Historic District.

This house was listed on the National Register of Historic Places in 1972.

== History and architectural features ==
Built in 1742 by Nicholas Newlin, this historic structure is one of the best preserved, eighteenth-century houses located in Concord Township. It was built with Flemish bond brickwork and a high stone foundation. Its asymmetrical windows divide the house into two sections, which appear to have been built at the same time. The windows are unusually large for a house of its period. The interior has retained much of its original appearance and includes fine Georgian panelling.

The Newlin family arrived in Pennsylvania in 1683 and purchased 500 acres (2.0 km^{2}) in what was then Chester County. Mary Mendenhall Newlin received a grant of land (as a young married woman in 1685, just prior to the Revolution of 1688) in Chester County as well.

Nicholas Newlin sold the house in 1751 to Micajah Speakman, who lived there until 1805.
