= Roaring Creek Friends Meeting House =

Coordinates: 40.8981°N 76.3986°W

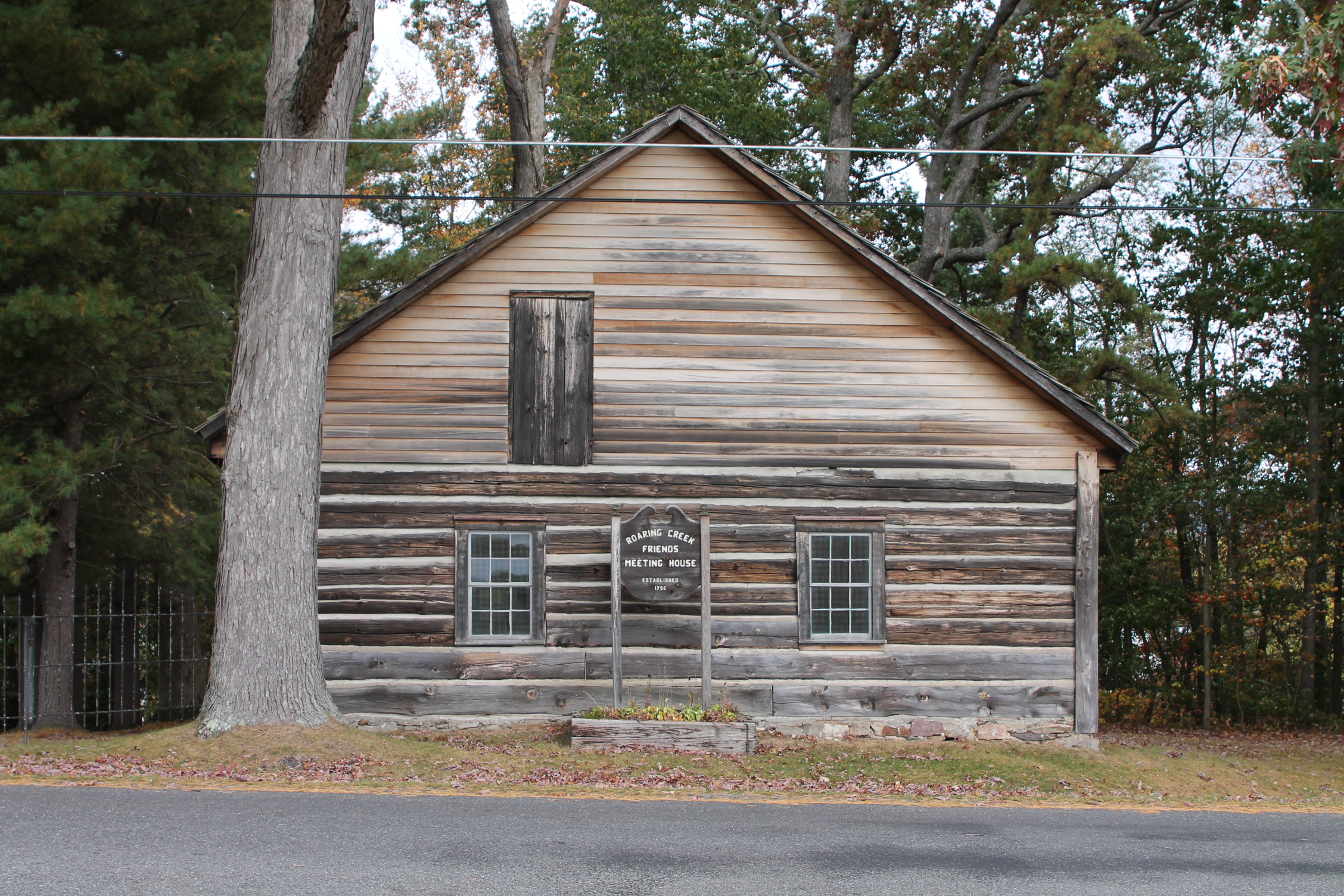
View from the south

The Roaring Creek Friends Meeting House is a historic place of worship for members of the Religious Society of Friends, or Quakers, in rural Columbia County, Pennsylvania, near Numidia on Quaker Meeting House Road.

The meeting house, built in 1795-96, is one of two extant meeting houses constructed of logs under the care of the Philadelphia Yearly Meeting. The other, the Catawissa Friends Meetinghouse is located about six miles north in Catawissa.

== History ==
In 1786, the first meeting (similar to a congregation in other denominations) was established at Roaring Creek under the sponsorship of Exeter Monthly Meeting. In 1796, when the meeting house was built, the meeting became a preparative meeting, as part of the Catawissa Monthly Meeting, along with preparative meetings at Fishing Creek and Muncy.

A decline in membership led the Catawissa Monthly Meeting to merge in 1814 with the Roaring Creek and Berwick meetings and relocate to the Roaring Creek Meeting House.

Elias Hicks is believed to have spoken at the Roaring Creek meeting house. About 1827, after the "great separation" between Hicksite and Orthodox Quakers, the meeting house was used by the Hicksites. By 1916, meetings for worship were held only once a month so the meeting was “laid down” or closed. It is now owned by Locust Township. Quakers in the area meet at Millville.

== Architecture ==
Though log meeting houses were commonly built by Pennsylvania Quakers during the early period of settlement, they were usually replaced quickly by stone, brick or frame construction.

The meeting house is divided into two unequally sized meeting rooms, one for the men’s business meeting and worship, the other for the women’s business meeting. The rooms are divided by a retractable wood partition. The partition has sections of three wood panels. In each section the middle panel folds down allowing communication, and the top panel can be propped up to fully open the partition. A door in the middle of the partition provides access between the rooms.

The meeting house has one story, measuring 30'-4" x 36'-5”, four bays by two bays. It is built of hewn logs, with chinking and corner boards. It has a rubble stone foundation, and a side-gable roof with wooden shingles. No chimneys are extant. Windows have six-over-six panes with batten shutters. The interior walls and ceiling are covered with wooden planks. Two rows of facing benches, where visiting ministers and senior members of the meeting would sit, are on a single raised tier. A simple set of stairs leading to the main doorway is the only exterior construction.

A burying ground is walled off, north of the meeting house.

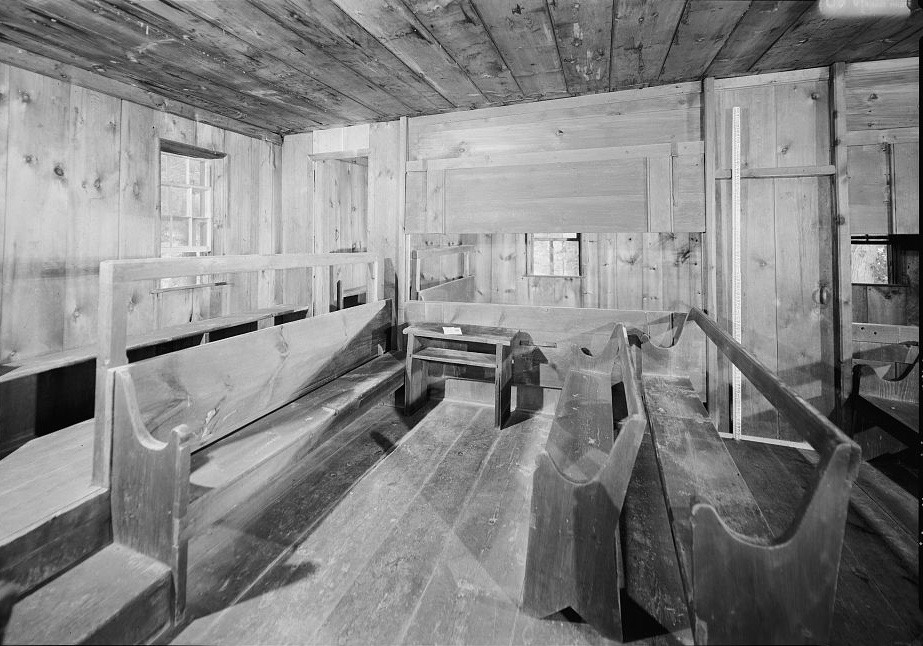
Facing benches on the left, partly open partition in the center rear

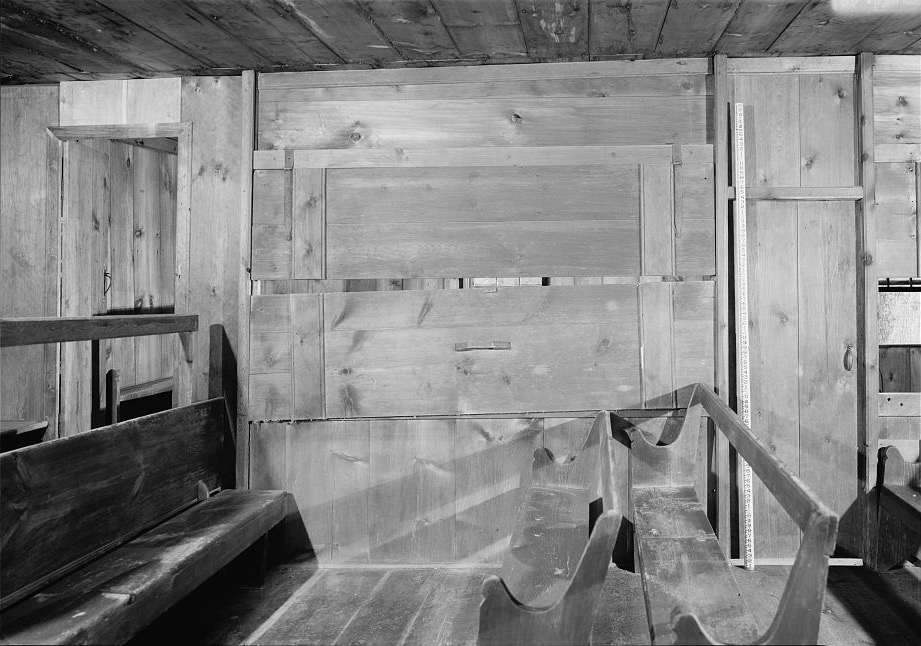
Facing benches on the left, closed partition in the center

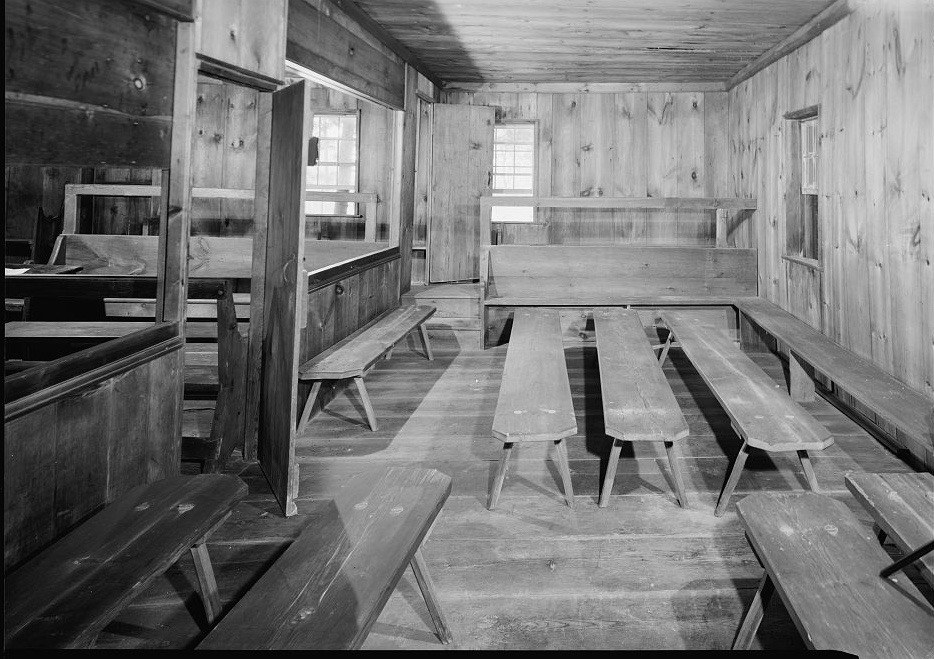
Women's meeting for business. Facing benches center, fully open partition on left
