= Wrightstown Friends Meeting Complex =

Historic church in Pennsylvania, United States

- U.S. National Register of Historic Places
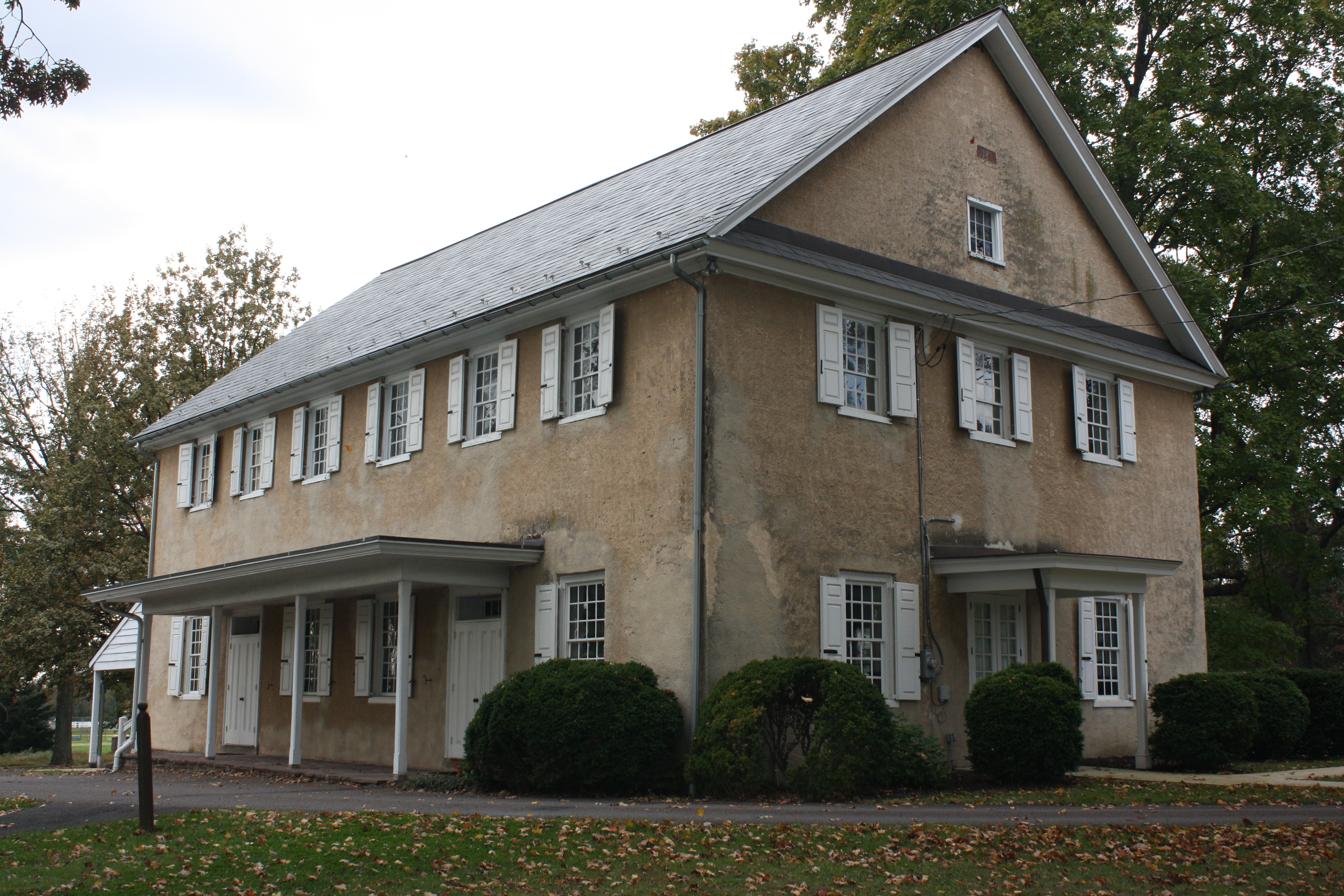
- Wrightstown Friends Meeting House. October 2012.

- Location within Pennsylvania Location within the United States
- Location: PA 413, Wrightstown, Pennsylvania
- Coordinates: 40°15′55″N 74°59′0″W
- Area: 14.7 acres (5.9 ha)
- Built: 1787
- NRHP reference No.: 75001624
- Added to NRHP: October 29, 1975

The Wrightstown Friends Meeting Complex is an historic Quaker meeting house that is located on PA 413 in Wrightstown, Pennsylvania, United States.

It was added to the National Register of Historic Places in 1975.

== History and notable features ==
Quaker activity in Wrightstown dates back to at least 1685. A log meetinghouse was built on the present site in 1708 and expanded in 1735 and 1737. A stone wall from the 1737 expansion was increased in height to two stories in 1787, as the present meetinghouse was built immediately to the north of the old meetinghouse. Edward Hicks, painter of The Peaceable Kingdom, attended services at this meetinghouse from 1814 to 1820.
