= Whitehorse, Chester County, Pennsylvania =

Unincorporated community in Pennsylvania, U.S.

Coordinates: 39°59′23″N 75°28′07″W

Whitehorse is an unincorporated community in Chester County, in the U.S. state of Pennsylvania.

== History ==
The community was named after a local tavern which had on its signboard the image of a white horse.
