= Catawissa Friends Meetinghouse =

Historic church in Pennsylvania, United States

- U.S. National Register of Historic Places
- Pennsylvania state historical marker
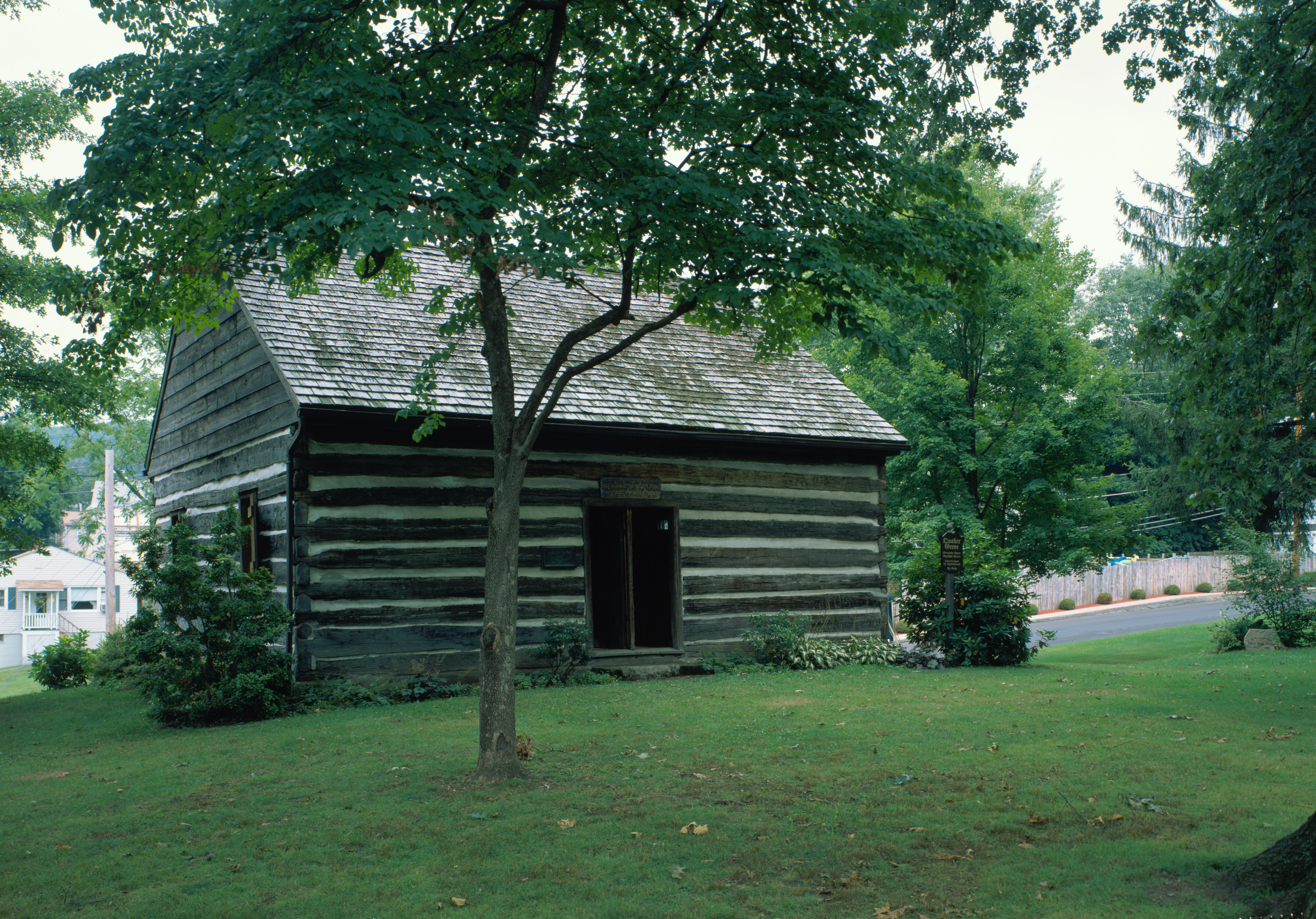
- Catawissa Friends Meetinghouse, 2002

- Location within Pennsylvania Location within the United States
- Location: South and 3rd Streets, Catawissa, Pennsylvania
- Coordinates: 40°57′12″N 76°27′41″W
- Area: 1 acre (0.40 ha)
- Built: 1789
- Architectural style: Log construction
- NRHP reference No.: 78002379

Significant dates
- Added to NRHP: June 9, 1978
- Designated PHMC: May 1948

Catawissa Friends Meetinghouse is a historic Quaker meetinghouse at South and 3rd Streets in Catawissa, Columbia County, Pennsylvania. It was built about 1789, and is a one-story log building on a stone foundation. It measures 30 feet (9.1 m) by 27 feet 6 inches (8.38 m).

It was added to the National Register of Historic Places in 1978.

== See also ==
- Roaring Creek Friends Meeting
