= Marlborough Village Historic District =

Historic district in Pennsylvania, United States

- U.S. National Register of Historic Places
- U.S. Historic district
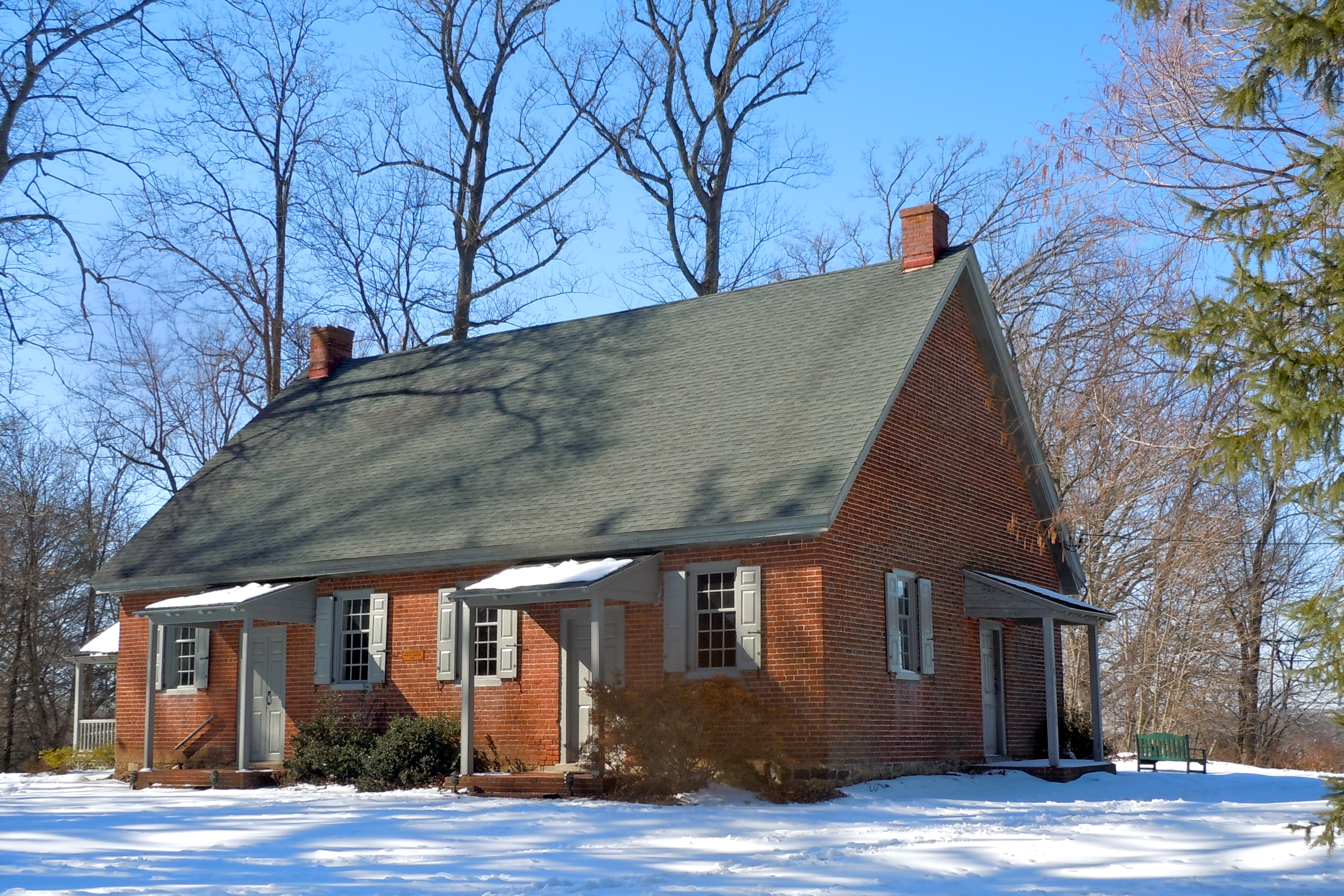
- Marlborough Meeting House, Marlborough Village Historic District, February 2011

- Location within Pennsylvania Location within the United States
- Location: 354-418 Marlborough Rd. and 901 and 940 Marlborough Springs Rd., East Marlborough Township and Newlin Township, Pennsylvania
- Coordinates: 39°54′00″N 75°42′11″W
- Area: 132 acres (53 ha)
- Built: 1801
- Architectural style: Bungalow/craftsman, Greek Revival, Kit houses
- NRHP reference No.: 95000130
- Added to NRHP: March 8, 1995

The Marlborough Village Historic District is a national historic district that is located in East Marlborough Township and Newlin Township, Chester County, Pennsylvania.

It was added to the National Register of Historic Places in 1995.

== History and architectural features ==
This historic district encompasses twenty-one contributing buildings and two contributing sites that are located in the crossroads community of Marlborough Village. It includes the Marlborough Meeting House, Schoolmaster's House (1829), General Store (1834) and residence, a former brick schoolhouse (1901), a small farm, a row of five houses that were built between 1840 and 1855, a Sears House bungalow known as the Brown House (1927), another pattern house known as the Larkin House (1938), and the Bernard/Wickersham farmhouse (1726, 1771) and barn (c. 1767).

== Gallery ==
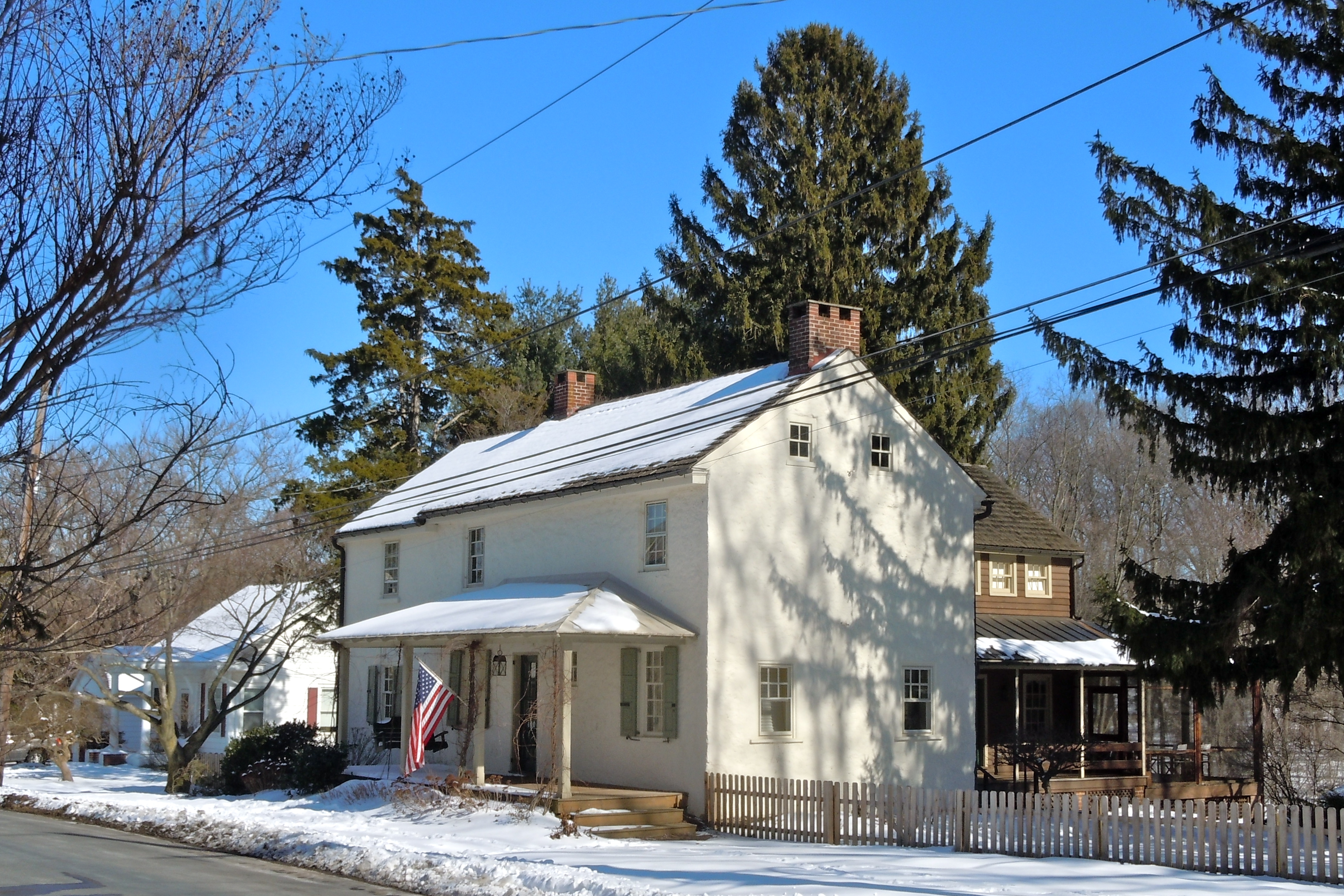
Schoolmaster's house

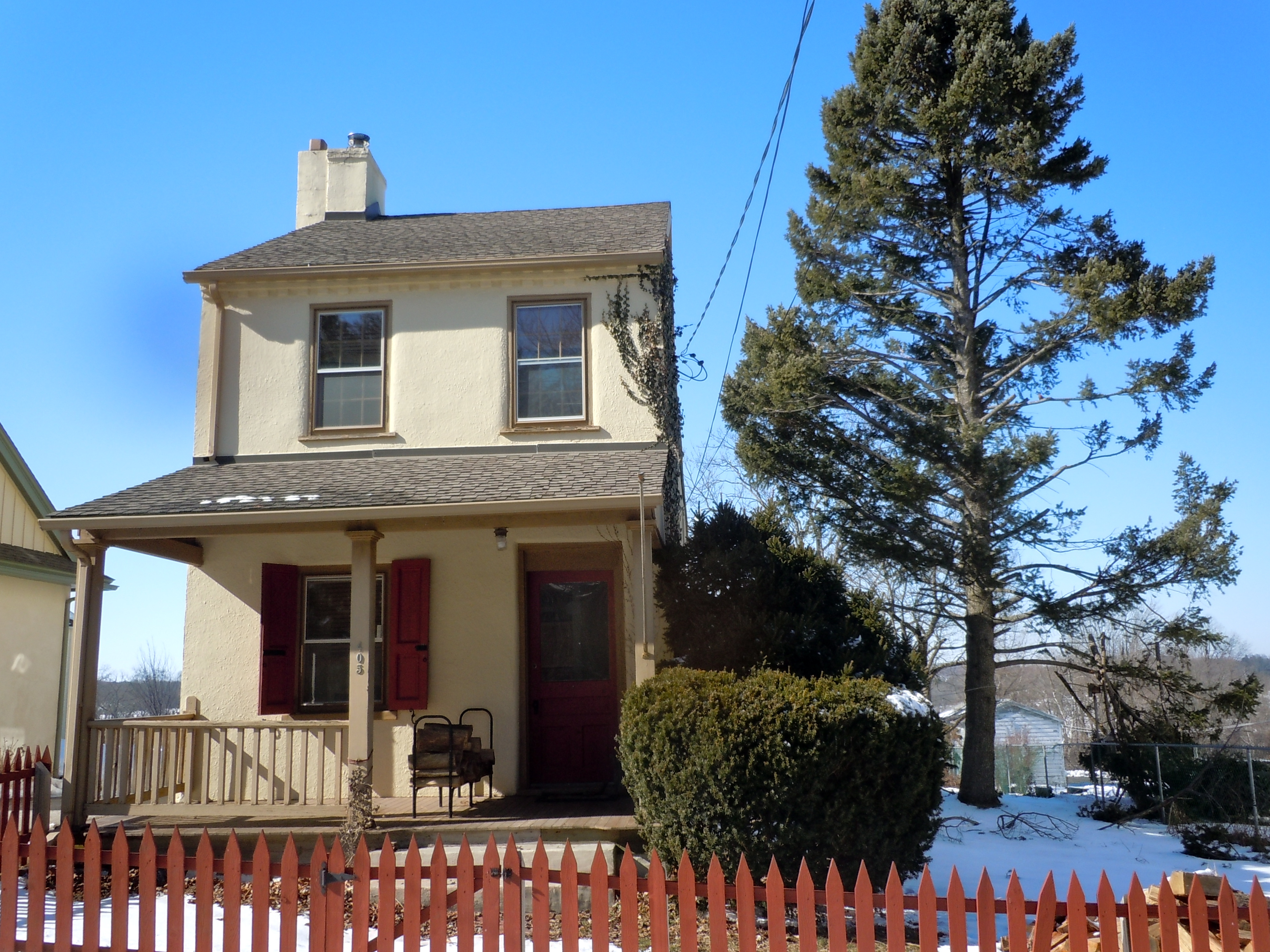
John Hucy House
