= Concordville, Pennsylvania =

Unincorporated community in Pennsylvania, US

- Concordville Historic District
- U.S. National Register of Historic Places
- U.S. Historic district
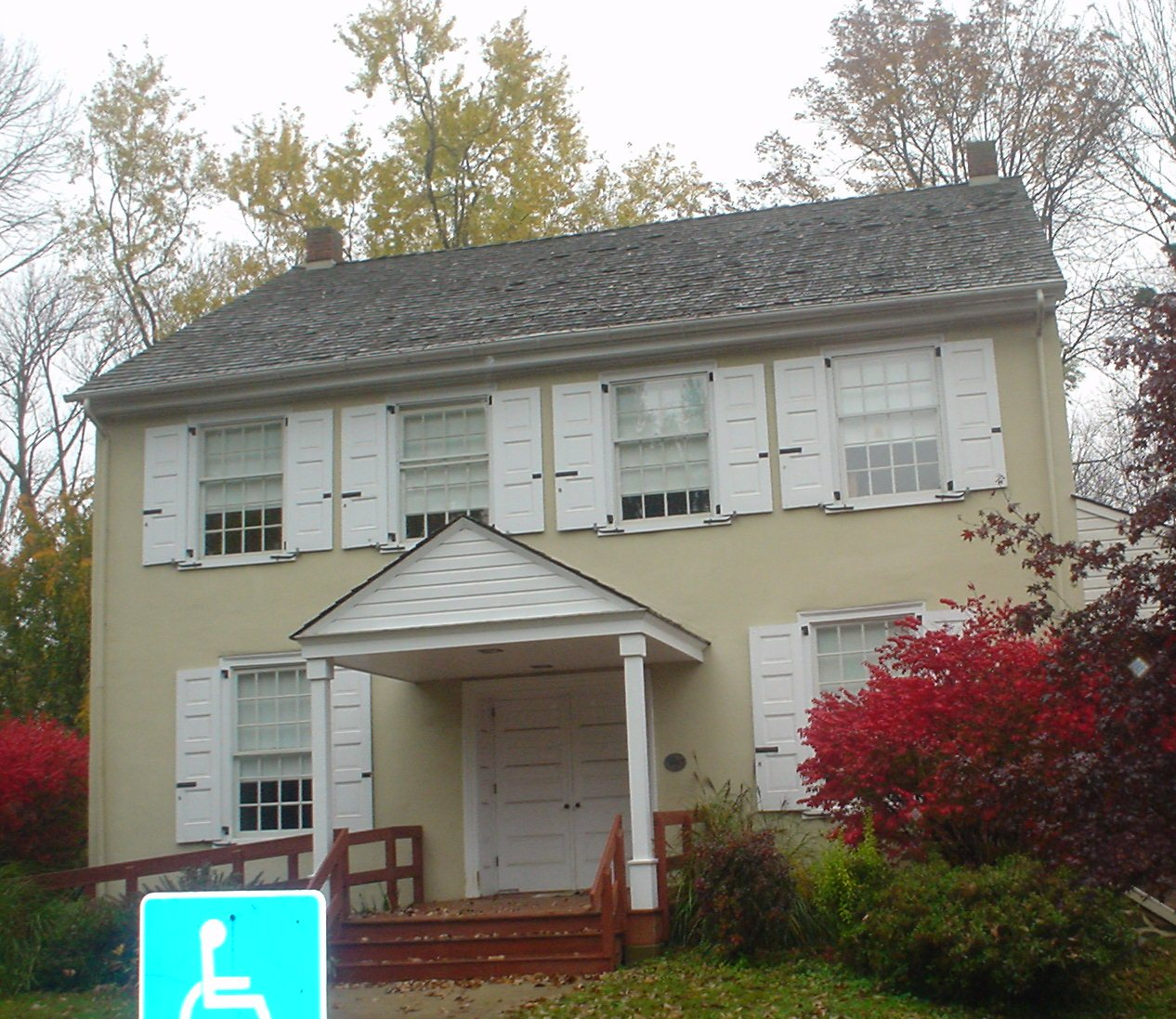
- Orthodox Friends Meetinghouse

- Location within Pennsylvania Location within the United States
- Location: Concord Rd. and Baltimore Pike, Concordville, Pennsylvania
- Area: 14 acres (5.7 ha)
- Built: 1728
- NRHP reference No.: 73001624
- Added to NRHP: April 03, 1973

Concordville is an unincorporated community in Concord Township, Delaware County, Pennsylvania, United States. It is located 20 miles west-southwest of Philadelphia, at the junction of U.S. Routes 1 and 322. This intersection can be traced back to two of the earliest roads in Pennsylvania, Baltimore Pike which became U.S. 1, and Concord Pike, which connected Pennsylvania with Delaware.

The first European settlement in the area took place circa 1700, after Quakers bought land from William Penn. Two Friends Meetinghouses (formerly Orthodox and Hicksite) are located in the village. The Orthodox meetinghouse was built in the first half of the nineteenth century, while the Hicksites retained the original meetinghouse (built 1728, reconstructed and expanded 1788). The two factions have since merged and now meet in the original meetinghouse. Part of the village was added to the National Register in 1973. Glen Mills Schools, a juvenile residential facility, is near Concordville.

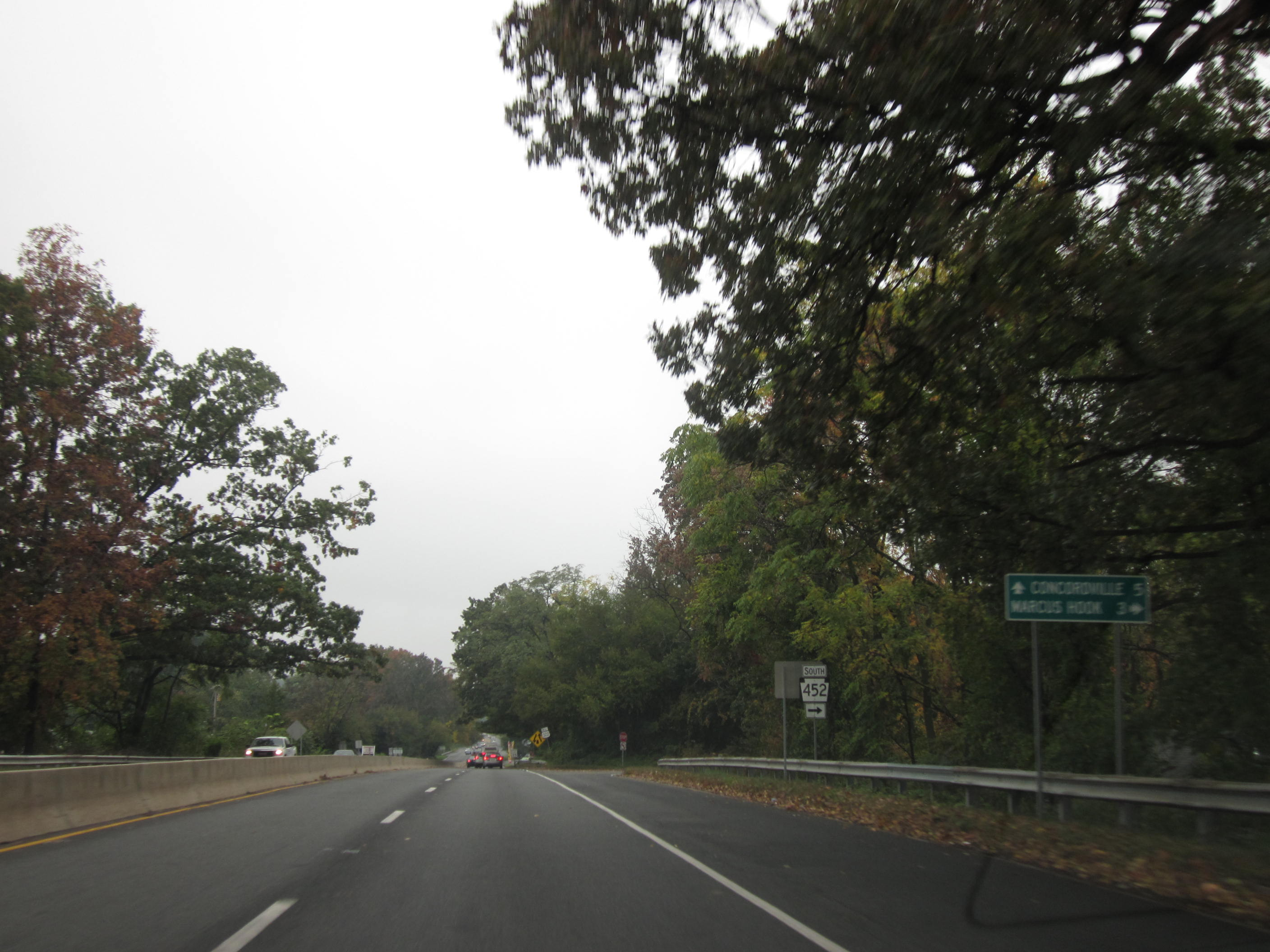
US_Route_322_-_Pennsylvania_(6295460132)_(2)

== Notable people ==
- Weldon Brinton Heyburn (Pennsylvania politician)
- Phil Margera
- Vincent Margera
- Sarah Stilwell Weber

== See also ==
- Concord Friends Meetinghouse
- Concordville Historic District
- Handwrought
- High Hill Farm
- Newlin Mill Complex
- Nicholas Newlin House
