= Armies in the American Civil War =

Organization and tactics of military units in the American Civil War

This article is designed to give background into the organization and tactics of Civil War armies. This brief survey is by no means exhaustive, but it should give enough material for a better understanding of the capabilities of the forces that fought the American Civil War. Understanding these capabilities should give insight into the reasoning behind the decisions made by commanders on both sides.

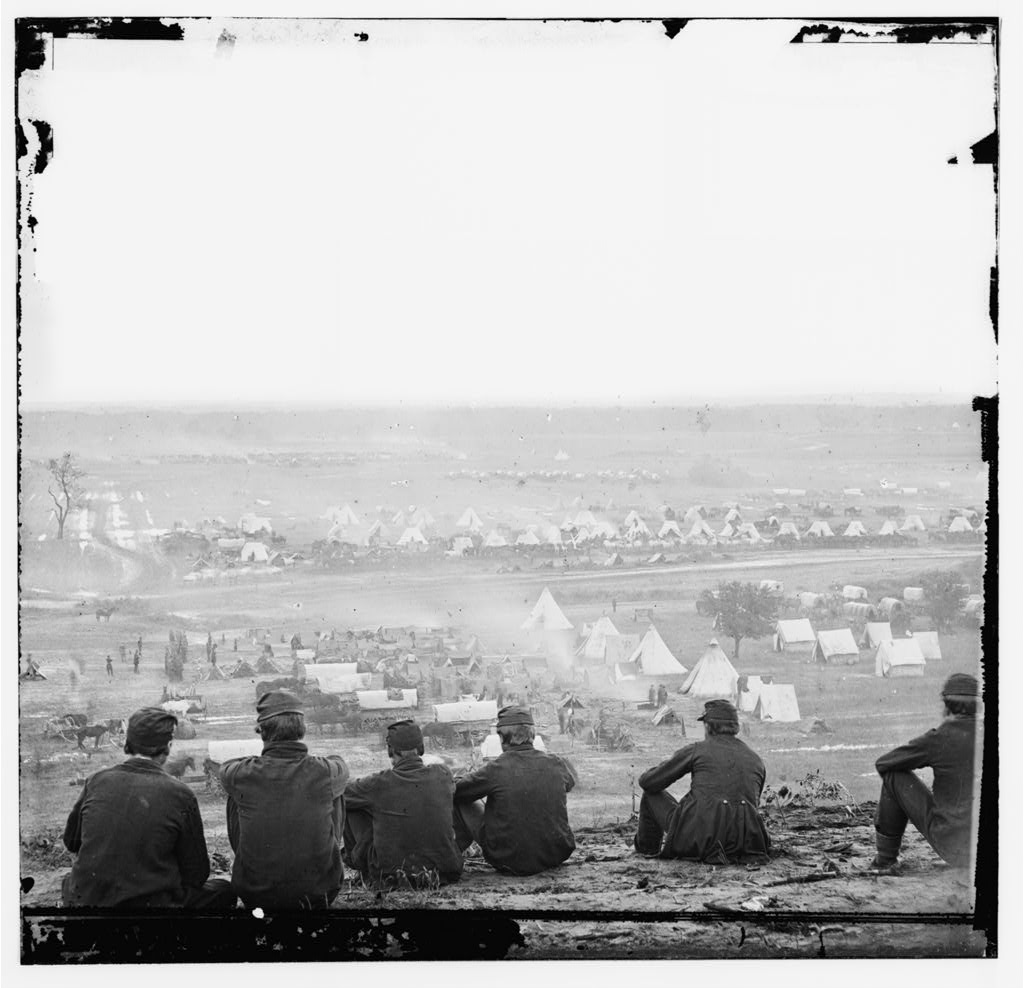
Federal encampment on Pamunkey River, Va. (May–August 1862).

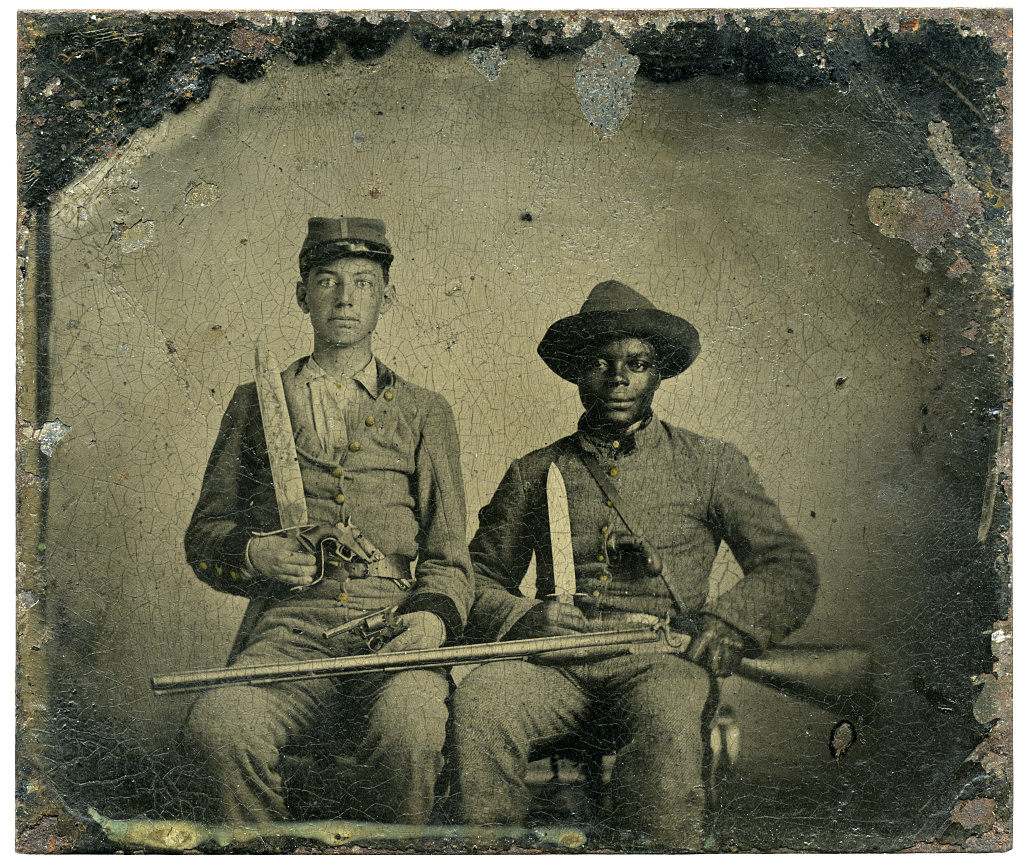
Sergeant A.M. Chandler of the 44th Mississippi Infantry Regiment, Co. F., and Silas Chandler, family slave, with Bowie knives, revolvers, pepper-box, shotgun, and canteen.

== Organization ==
=== The US Army in 1861 ===
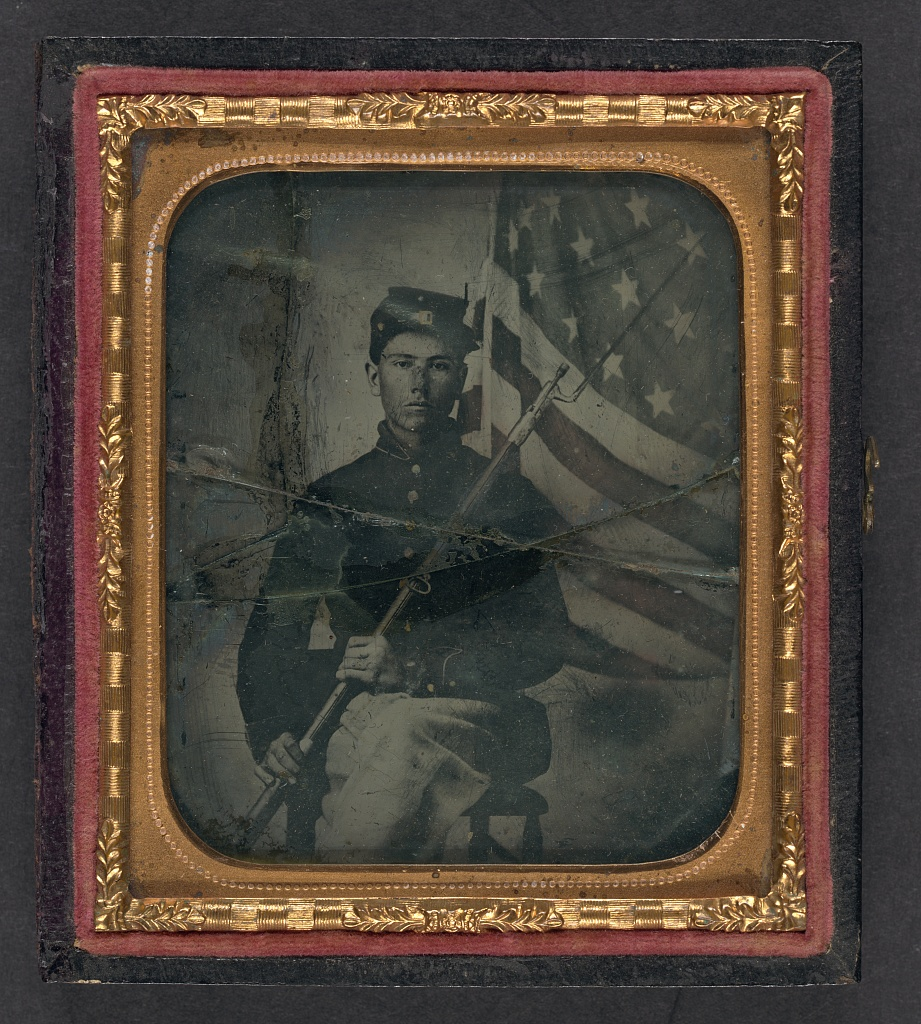
Unidentified soldier in Union uniform with bayoneted musket in front of American flag.

The United States Army, known also as the Regular Army, was a small, scattered constabulary force ill-equipped to fight a major conflict on the eve of the Civil War. Partly this was due to a Jeffersonian ideal which saw a standing army as a threat to democracy and whose elitist, hierarchical structure was in conflict with the concepts of equality and rugged individualism. It was also due to a realistic assessment of the situation: since the War of 1812, the threat of external invasion was unlikely, and a small force was sufficient for conquering and displacing Native American tribes. If the need arose, the Regular Army could be supplemented by raising United States Volunteers and incorporating state militia.

As of January 1, 1861, the Regular Army on paper consisted of 16,403 officers and enlisted men, but only 14,658 were actually present for duty. A further 340 civilian clerks, teamsters and laborers were also employed. The Army was split into two organizations: the Line of the Army, which constituted the actual fighting force in the field, and the Staff Departments, which provided administrative and logistical support. The Secretary of War had control over the Army but by tradition would appoint a "major general commanding in chief" (or general-in-chief) to oversee field operations. The authority of the general-in-chief was unclear however as it was an extralegal position rather than one created by Congressional statue. At the time it was held by Lieutenant General Winfield Scott, the 75‑year‑old hero of the Mexican–American War.

The Line of the Army consisted of nineteen regiments: ten infantry regiments, five mounted regiments (two cavalry, two dragoon, and one of mounted riflemen), and four artillery regiments. Each infantry and mounted regiment was divided into ten companies while the artillery each consisted of twelve, for a total of 197 companies. However, all of the infantry and cavalry companies, along with 30 of the artillery companies, were west of the Mississippi River, scattered among 79 posts. All field units fell within one of six geographical departments and answered to its commander, who in turn reported directly to the general-in-chief.

The Staff Departments or bureaus provided the necessary administrative support to keep the army fed, clothed and armed, reflecting the modern concepts of combat support and combat service support. Modeled after the British system, each bureau operated independently of the other in setting their own standards and operating procedures. The head of each staff department, sometimes called the bureau chief, reported directly to the Secretary of War but also tended to have a direct relationship with Congress too. In total there were 352 staff officers and 831 enlisted personnel in the Staff Departments at the start of the year, suitable for the time but their numbers would necessarily grow to meet the needs of the expanding army.

The Regular Army remained under Federal control during the war, although 270 officers and hundreds of enlisted men joined with the South. The question of what to do with it once hostilities started however was hotly debated. One option would have been to use the Regulars as a training and leadership cadre for the newly-formed volunteer units. The government ultimately decided to keep the Regulars together, to form a core of reliable reserves for the upcoming battles. Although it was expanded in size to a peak authorized strength of 41,000, there were never more than 26,000 men serving in the Regular Army at any one time. Service in the Volunteers was preferable to the average soldier as discipline was less severe, the length of service was not as long, and their friends could all join and fight together. By 1864 many Regular units were so depleted they were withdrawn from the frontlines.

=== Raising armies ===
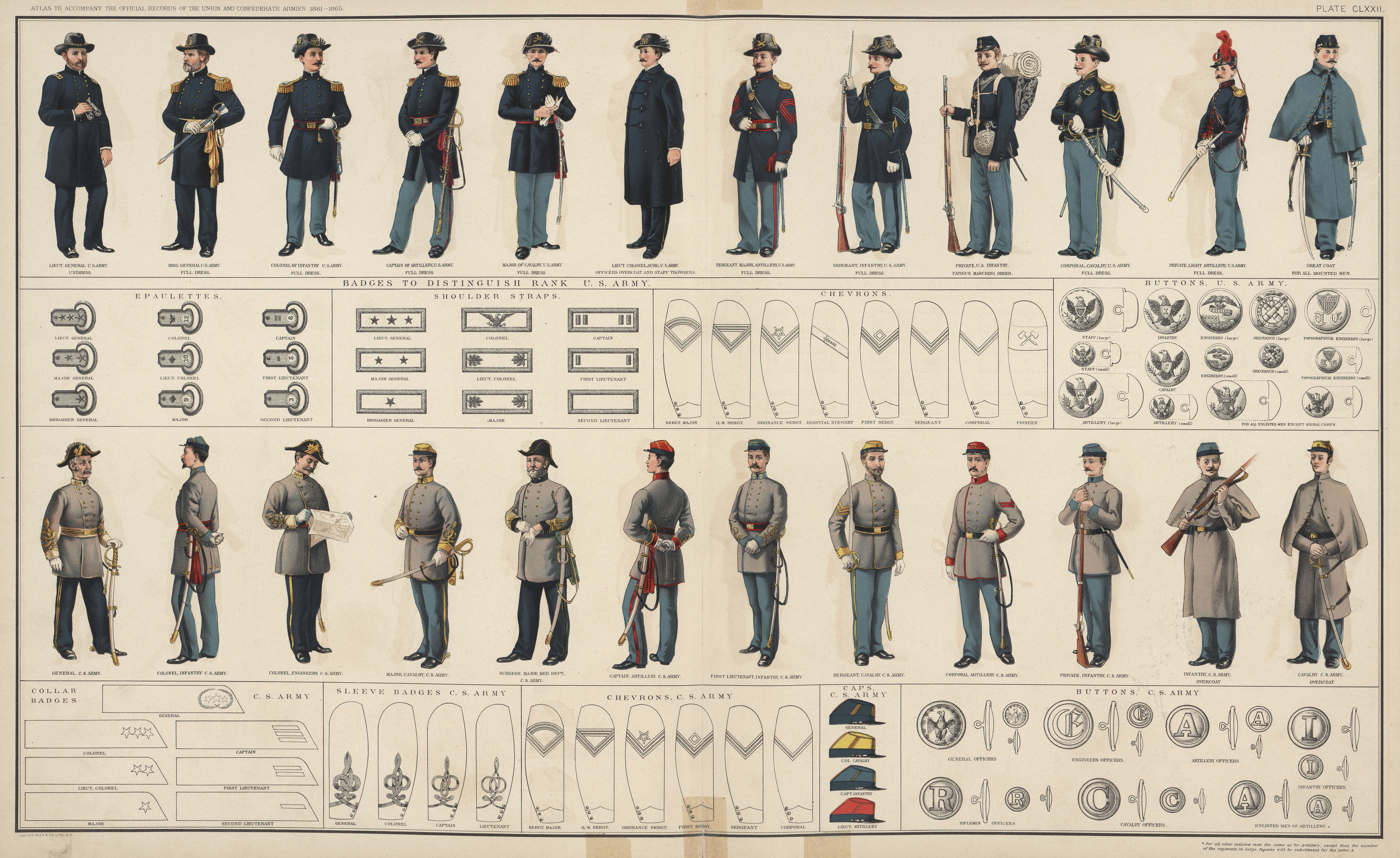
Uniforms worn by Union and Confederate soldiers during the American Civil War

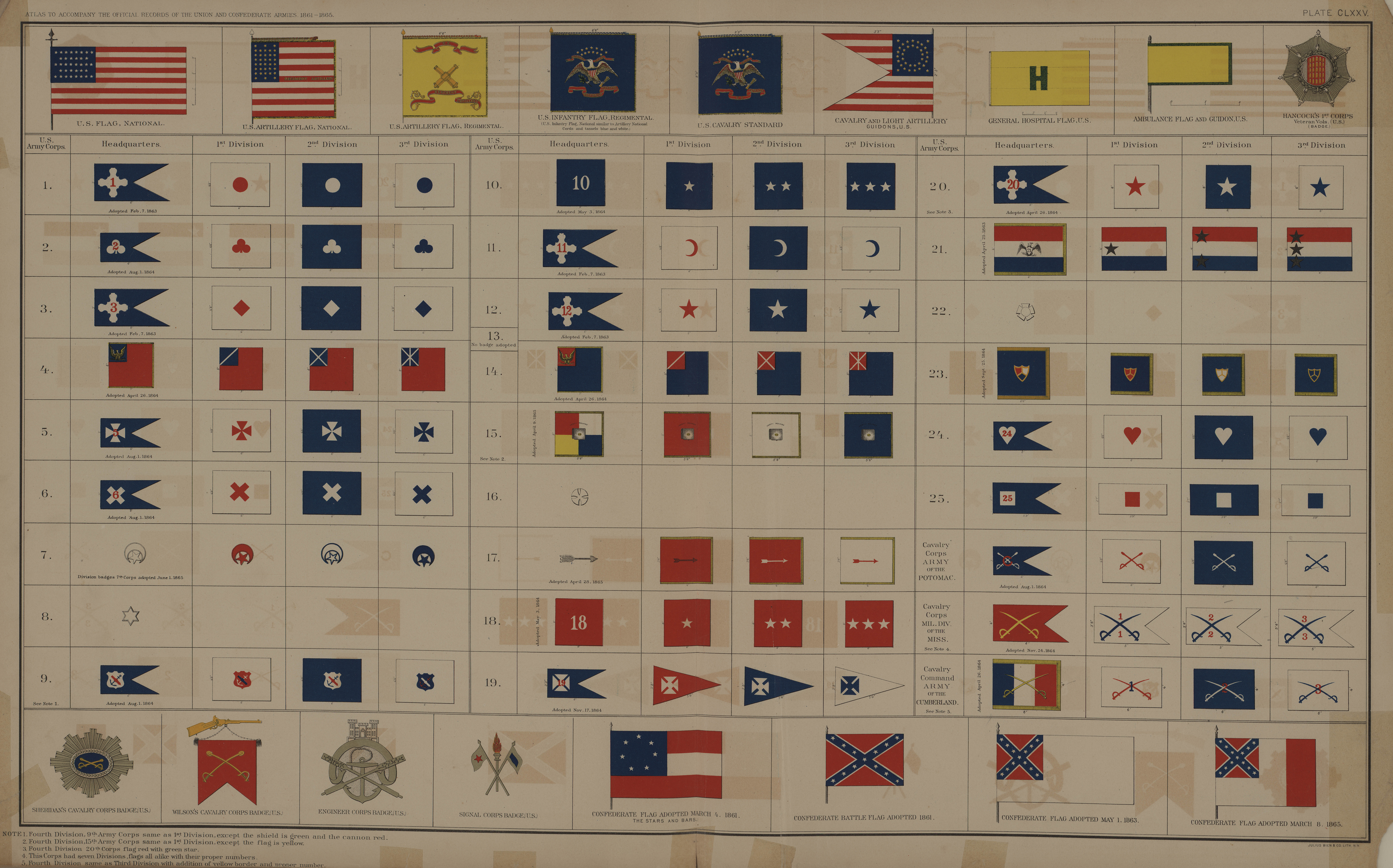
Union and Confederate flags during the American Civil War

Just days after the fall of Fort Sumter, President Lincoln declared the Confederate states in open rebellion. Using the authority granted to him under the 1795 federal militia statue, he called for the loyal states to furnish 75,000 militia for three months (the statutory limit). Two weeks later he issued a second call, this time asking for 42,000 state volunteers and the expansion of the regular army (the Regular Army remained under the control of the Federal government, although 270 officers and hundreds of enlisted men would leave the ranks to join the Confederates). Both calls were met with a vast outpouring of volunteers. Although nothing under the 1795 statue authorized the follow-up call, Lincoln justified it on the basis of the "war power of the government" and Congress retroactively approved when it was back in session.

Lincoln hoped this show of force would be enough to dissuade the rebels, but in fact it had the opposite effect. States like Virginia had wanted to sit out the conflict, but when forced to choose they sided with the Confederates as pro-secession feelings became inflamed. The Confederate military mirrored that of the Federal, with a small professional army on paper but a much larger Provisional Army of the Confederate States under which regiments of state volunteers were formed. In March the Confederate Congress had authorized the acceptance of 100,000 one-year volunteers. It was met with such overwhelming response that recruiters had to turn away volunteers for lack of arms and equipment. This did not stop a second call for 400,000 volunteers in May, with terms of three years or until the war's end.

As the states bore the responsibility of recruiting and organizing these volunteer units, there was no standard procedure in place, and so it became a matter of local political initiative. A community held a recruitment rally where the local young men were encouraged to join up. Organizing themselves into companies, these recruits were moved to a "camp of rendezvous" which might be a local park or fairground. Here the companies would be organized into regiments and issued arms, uniforms and equipment, assuming any were available. Either here or, if it was too small, after moving on to a "camp of instruction" the officers were chosen and the men taught the basics of military drill and discipline.

Although neither side faced recruitment difficulties at first, as the war progressed and casualties mounted it became increasingly harder to refill the ranks. The first conscription laws in American history were passed by the Confederate government in April 1862, followed by the Federal government in March 1863. Neither law was popular with the common folk: those with money could afford to hire a substitute to take their place or pay commutation fees, and in the South slaveowners with more than twenty slaves were exempt. The mere threat of being conscripted was encouragement enough to convince many men to volunteer willingly, and so relatively few were actually conscripted.

The North in particular tried various means to limit the effect of conscription on the populace. Bounties were paid out to those willing to join voluntarily, and various reenlistment bonuses were offered to keep veterans within the ranks. The Invalid Corps was created so that wounded soldiers filled out essential rear area duties, freeing the able-bodied for frontline duty. Perhaps the most radical measure however was enlisting African Americans for service. The Militia Act of 1862 gave Lincoln the authority to do so, but it was only after the Emancipation Proclamation was any effort made. By May 1863 the Bureau of Colored Troops had been created to oversee the organization of Black soldiers as United States Colored Troops. In total, 178,000 African Americans fought in the Union army and another 10,000 in the navy.

Ultimately, both sides succeeded in raising armies the size of which had never been seen before in the nation's history. A total of 2,128,948 men would serve the Union cause throughout the course of the war, representing a third of the North's military-age male population. Confederate records were either lost or destroyed during the war, but it is estimated that a little under one million men served, representing fourth-fifths of the South's military-age male population.

=== Unit Structure ===
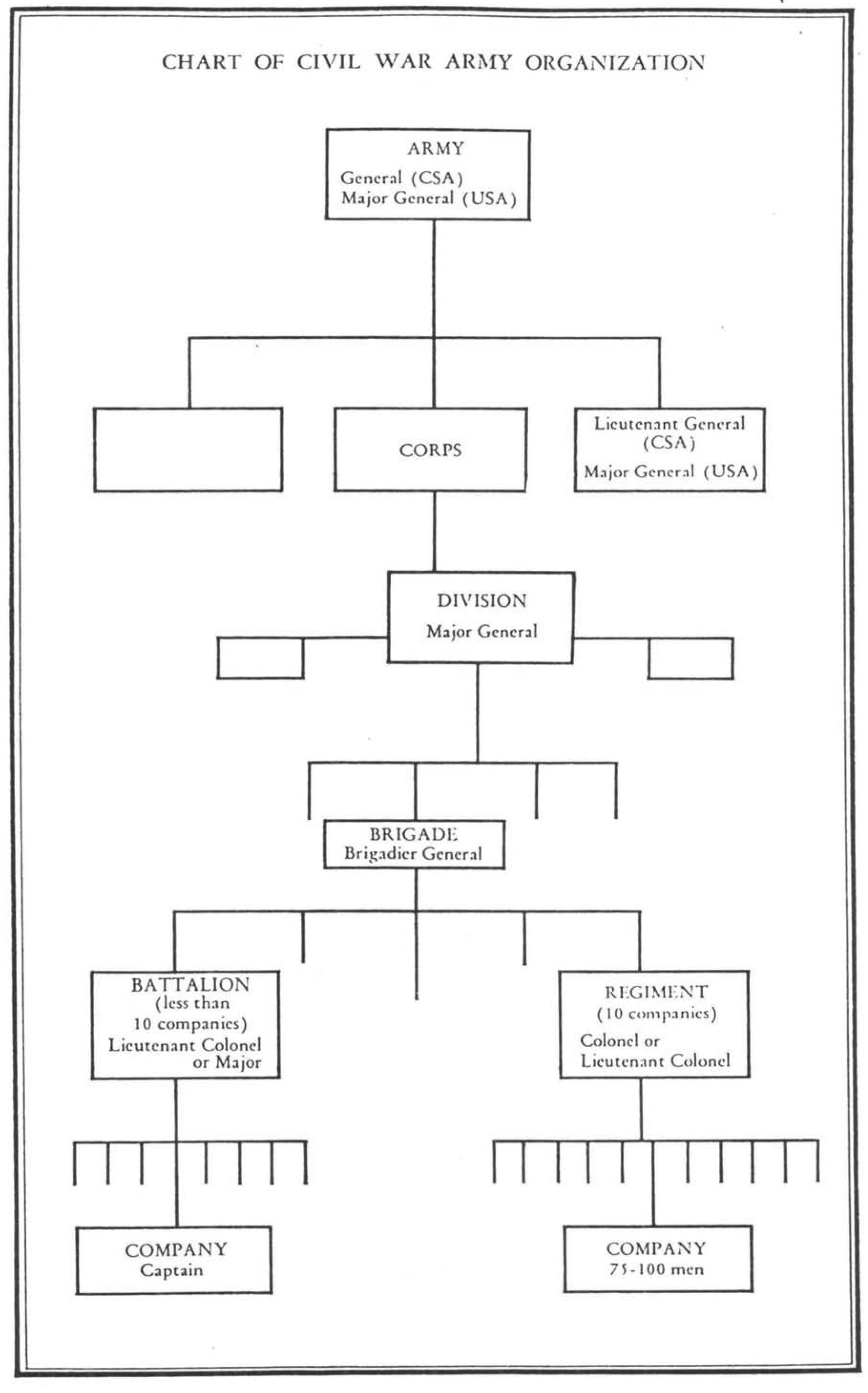
Typical army organization during the American Civil War

The unit structure of both the Confederate Army and Union Army were generally the same, being as they were both derived from the pre-war Regular Army. The combat arms to which these units belonged were the same as well — the infantry, cavalry, or artillery (both field and siege). In the Union Army, 80% of all soldiers were in the infantry, with 14% as cavalry and 6% as artillerymen. The Confederate Army had a similar ratio with 75%, 20% and 5% of its soldiers in these fields respectively. However, while sharing the same names and organizations, the actual fighting strength of these units could vary wildly. Losses from both combat and non-combat reasons usually meant fewer soldiers than the "paper strength" suggested. Some units were also misnamed, whether by accident or ignorance, or might retain the same designation after being broken up or consolidated with other units. As the recruitment and replacement for these units were the responsibility of the states, many governors preferred to create new ones as a form of political patronage. Attempts were made to replenish existing units back to their full strength — a task at which the Confederates were more successful — but as their combat effectiveness decreased due to attrition, many veteran units ended up being disbanded or combined into new units.

The company was the smallest military unit, though it could be divided into sub-units like platoons and squads. An infantry company would consist of around a hundred soldiers, commanded by a captain, who was assisted by other junior officers and non-commissioned officers (NCOs). A cavalry company was similarly organized; in 1862 the Federals introduced the term Troop though many soldiers continued to use the older term. Two troops could be combined together to form a squadron. The artillery equivalent was called a battery and ideally organized with six cannons, though four cannons was common, especially among the Confederates. Each cannon had its own crew to operate it in battle, and drivers to manage the teams of horses that pulled it and accompanying wagons. Gun crews would march on foot unless the battery was organized as horse artillery, in which case every soldier rode their own horse.

A battalion was the next largest unit, though in most cases there was no legally set size, only that it consisted of two or more companies. Thus a regiment might have multiple battalions, though most commonly it would be split into two battalions. Separate battalions were formed by both armies during the war, particularly among the cavalry. When detaching companies for an operation, cavalry regiments combine four troops into a battalion. Most Confederate batteries were grouped together into four-battery battalions, with one battalion assigned to a division and others kept in reserve.

The regiment was considered the foundational unit at the start of the Civil War for infantry and cavalry. Nominally it would number 1,000 soldiers, but the actual combat strength was often less than half of that due to combat losses, illnesses, desertions and detachments. The infantry regiment consisted of ten companies and was commanded by a colonel, assisted by a lieutenant colonel, a major, and a staff of officers and NCOs. Cavalry regiments were similarly organized, though later in the war the Union transitioned to a twelve-troop model. Artillery regiments differed in that they were purely administrative, with their constituent batteries detached to serve in other units.

Federal and Confederate Organized Forces
Infantry
| Federal | Confederate |
| 19 Regular Regiments | 642 Regiments |
| 2,125 Volunteer Regiments | 9 Legions* |
| 60 Volunteer Battalions | 163 Separate Battalions |
| 351 Separate Companies | 62 Separate Companies |
Artillery
| Federal | Confederate |
| 5 Regular Regiments | 16 Regiments |
| 61 Volunteer Regiments | 25 Battalions |
| 17 Volunteer Battalions | 227 Batteries |
| 408 Separate Batteries | |
Cavalry
| Federal | Confederate |
| 6 Regular Regiments | 137 Regiments |
| 266 Volunteer Regiments | 1 Legion* |
| 45 Battalions | 143 Separate Battalions |
| 78 Separate Companies | 101 Separate Companies |
*Legions were a form of combined arms team, with artillery, cavalry, and infantry. They were approximately the strength of a large regiment. Long before the end of the war, legions lost their combined arms organization.

For both sides, the infantry unit structure above regimental level was similar to today's structure, with a brigade controlling three to five regiments and a division controlling two or more brigades. Federal brigades generally contained regiments from more than one state, while Confederate brigades often consisted of regiments from the same state. In the Confederate Army, a brigadier general usually commanded a brigade, and a major general commanded a division. The Federal Army, with no rank higher than major general until 1864, often had colonels commanding brigades, brigadier generals commanding divisions, and major generals commanding corps and armies. Grant received the revived rank of lieutenant general in 1864, placing him with clear authority over all of the Federal armies, but rank squabbles between the major generals appeared within the Union command structure throughout the Overland Campaign. Union brigades averaged 1,000 to 1,500 men, while on the Confederate side they averaged 1,500 to 1,800. Union brigades were designated by a number within their division, and each Confederate brigade was designated by the name of its current or former commander.

Divisions were formed of two or more brigades. Union divisions contained 1,500 to 4,000 men, while the Confederate division was somewhat larger, containing 5,000 to 6,000 men. As with brigades, Union divisions were designated by a number in the Corps, while each Confederate division took the name of its current or former commander. Corps were formed of two or more divisions. The strength of a Union corps averaged 9,000 to 12,000 officers and men, those of Confederate armies might average 20,000. Two or more corps usually constituted an army, the largest operational organization. During the Civil War there were at least 16 armies on the Union side, and 23 on the Confederate side. In the Eastern Theater, the two principal adversaries were the Union Army of the Potomac and the Confederate Army of Northern Virginia. There were generally seven corps in the Union Army of the Potomac, although by the spring of 1864 the number was reduced to four. From the Peninsula campaign through the Battle of Antietam the Confederate Army of Northern Virginia was organized into Longstreet's and Jackson's "commands," of about 20,000 men each. In November 1862 the Confederate Congress officially designated these commands as corps. After Jackson's death in May 1863 his corps was divided in two, and thereafter the Army of Northern Virginia consisted of three corps.

=== Leaders ===
Because the organization, equipment, tactics, and training of the Confederate and Federal armies were similar, the performance of units in battle often depended on the quality and performance of their individual leaders. Both sides sought ways to find this leadership for their armies. The respective central governments appointed the general officers. At the start of the war, most, but certainly not all, of the more senior officers had West Point or other military school experience. In 1861, Lincoln appointed 126 general officers, of which 82 were or had been professionally trained officers. Jefferson Davis appointed 89, of which 44 had received professional training. The rest were political appointees, but of these only 16 Federal and 7 Confederate generals lacked military experience.

Of the lower ranking volunteer officers who comprised the bulk of the leadership for both armies, state governors normally appointed colonels (regimental commanders). States also appointed other field grade officers, although many were initially elected within their units. Company grade officers were usually elected by their men. This long‑established militia tradition, which seldom made military leadership and capability a primary consideration, was largely an extension of states’ rights and sustained political patronage in both the Union and the Confederacy.

Much has been made of the West Point backgrounds of the men who ultimately dominated the senior leadership positions of both armies, but the graduates of military colleges were not prepared by such institutions to command divisions, corps, or armies. Moreover, though many leaders had some combat experience from the Mexican War era, very few had experience above the company or battery level in the peacetime years prior to 1861. As a result, the war was not initially conducted at any level by "professional officers" in today's terminology. Leaders became more professional through experience and at the cost of thousands of lives. General William T. Sherman would later note that the war did not enter its "professional stage" until 1863. By the time of the Overland Campaign, many officers, though varying in skill, were at least comfortable at commanding their formations.

=== Civil War Staffs ===
In the Civil War, as today, the success of large military organizations and their commanders often depended on the effectiveness of the commanders’ staffs. Modern staff procedures have evolved only gradually with the increasing complexity of military operations. This evolution was far from complete in 1861, and throughout the war, commanders personally handled many vital staff functions, most notably operations and intelligence. The nature of American warfare up to the mid-19th century did not seem to overwhelm the capabilities of single commanders. However, as the Civil War progressed the armies grew larger and the war effort became a more complex undertaking and demanded larger staffs. Both sides only partially adjusted to the new demands, and bad staff work hindered operations for both the Union and Confederate forces in the Overland Campaign.

Civil War staffs were divided into a "general staff" and a "staff corps." This terminology, defined by Winfield Scott in 1855, differs from modern definitions of the terms. Except for the chief of staff and aides-de-camp, who were considered personal staff and would often depart when a commander was reassigned, staffs mainly contained representatives of the various bureaus, with logistical areas being best represented. Later in the war, some truly effective staffs began to emerge, but this was the result of the increased experience of the officers serving in those positions rather than a comprehensive development of standard staff procedures or guidelines.

Major General George B. McClellan, when he appointed his father‑in‑law, was the first to officially use the title "chief of staff." Even though many senior commanders had a chief of staff, this position was not used in any uniform way and seldom did the man in this role achieve the central coordinating authority of the chief of staff in a modern headquarters. This position, along with most other staff positions, was used as an individual commander saw fit, making staff responsibilities somewhat different under each commander. This inadequate use of the chief of staff was among the most important shortcomings of staffs during the Civil War. An equally important weakness was the lack of any formal operations or intelligence staff. Liaison procedures were also ill-defined, and various staff officers or soldiers performed this function with little formal guidance. Miscommunication or lack of knowledge of friendly units proved disastrous time after time in the war's campaigns.

Typical Staff
General Staff
Chief of staff Aides
Assistant adjutant general
Assistant inspector general
Staff Corps
Engineer
Ordnance
Quartermaster
Subsistence
Medical
Pay
Signal
Provost marshal
Chief of artillery

== Weapons ==
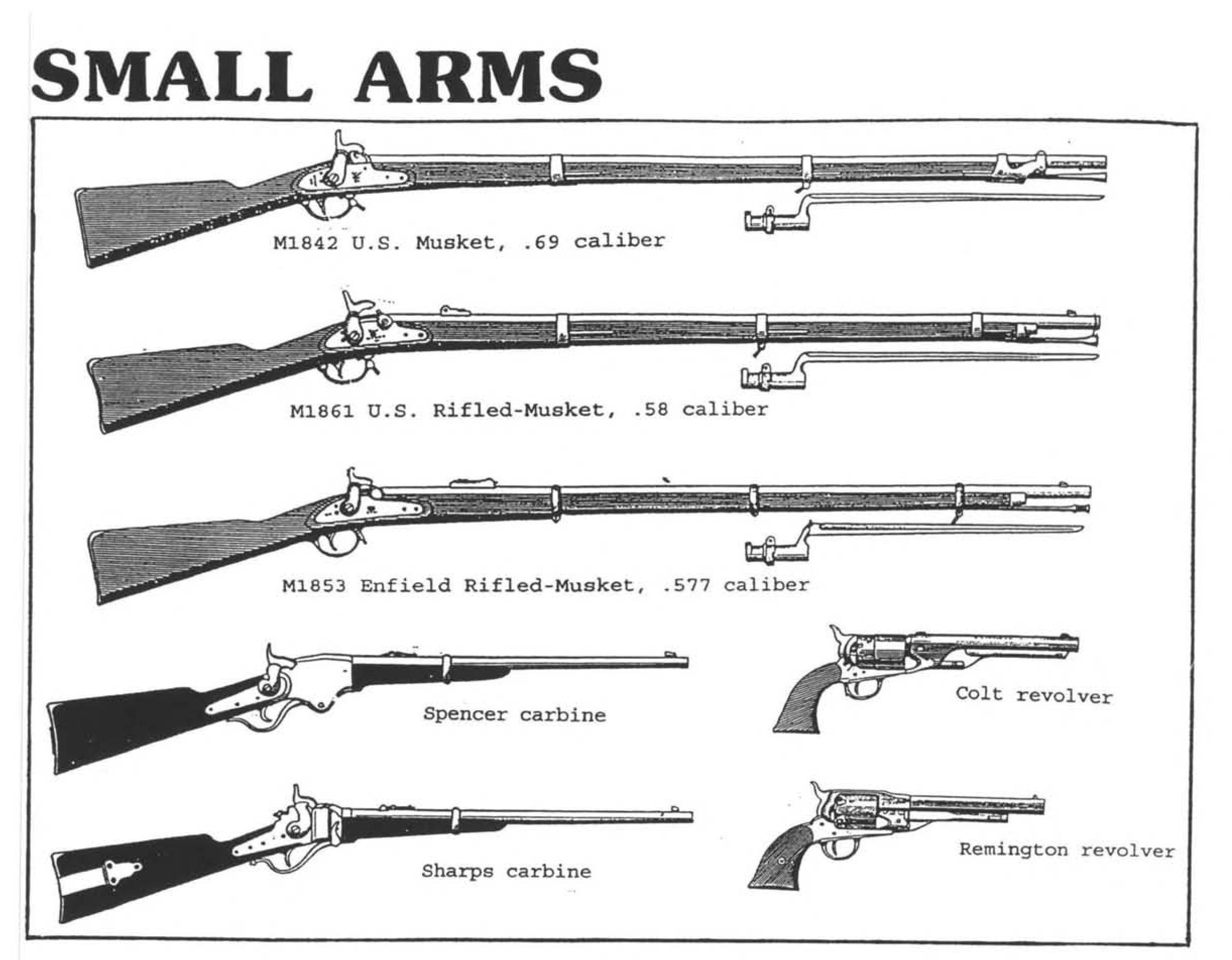
Examples of common Civil War small arms

There were a wide variety of weapons used during the Civil War, especially in the early days as both sides struggled to arm their rapidly-expanding forces. Everything from antique flintlock firearms to early examples of machine guns and sniper rifles saw use to one extent or the other. However, the most common weapon to be used by Northern and Southern soldiers was the rifled musket. Born from the development of the percussion cap and the Minié ball, rifled muskets had much greater range than smoothbore muskets while being easier to load than previous rifles.

Most firearms were muzzleloaders which were armed by pouring the gunpowder and bullet down the muzzle. While they only fired once before needing to be reloaded, a trained soldier could achieve a rate of fire of three rounds per minute. Newer breechloaders were easier and quicker to reload, but perhaps the most revolutionary development were repeating firearms, which could fire multiple times before reloading. However, for a number of reasons, repeating firearms did not see widespread use.

The diversity of long guns in the war led to a classification system which categorized them by their quality and effectiveness. There were "first class" weapons like Springfield rifles, "second class" weapons like the older M1841 Mississippi rifle, and "third class" weapons like the Springfield Model 1842 musket. Efforts were made to ensure that troops had the best possible firearms available, including rearming with captured enemy weapons after a battle.

Typical Civil War weapons and equipment

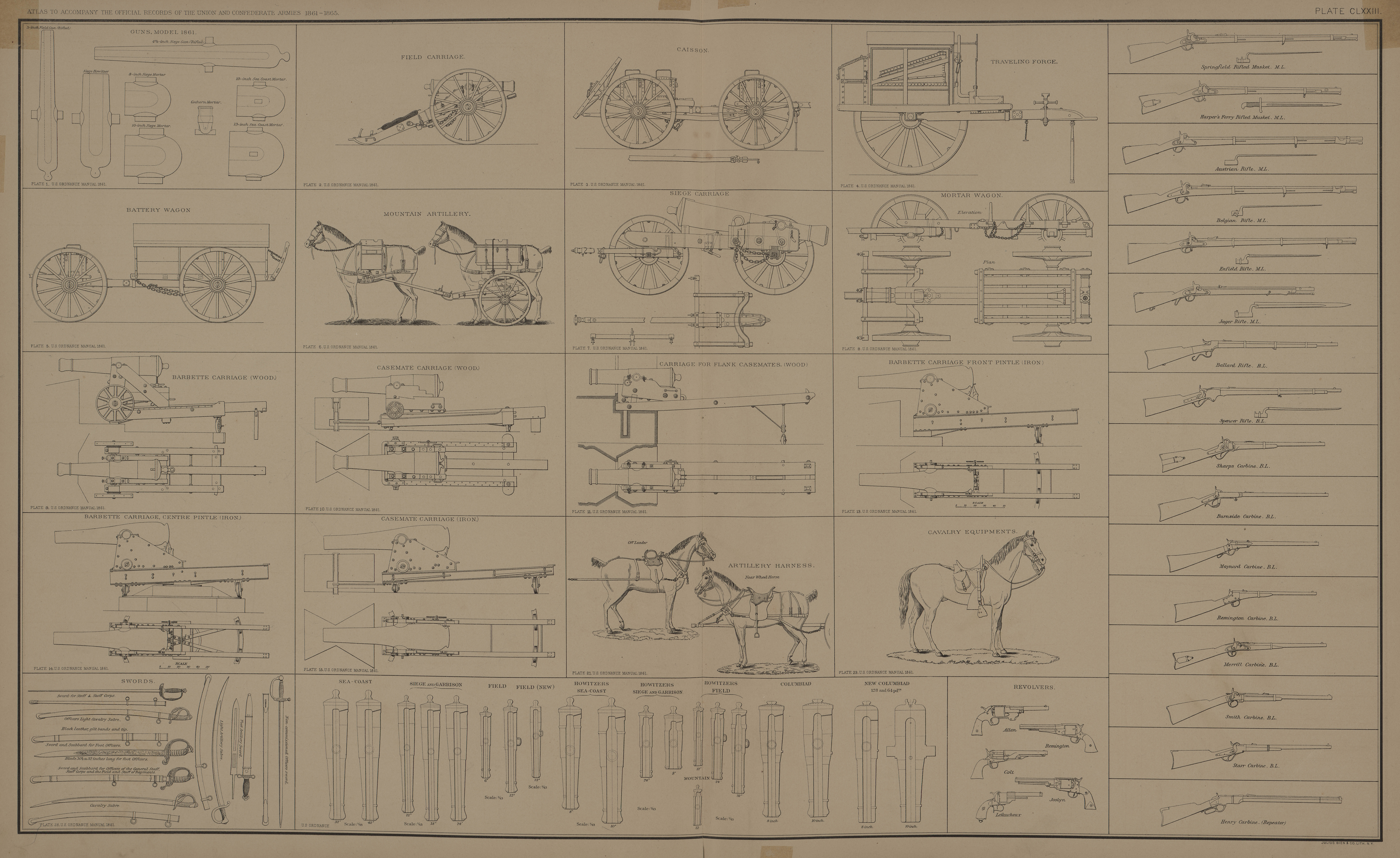

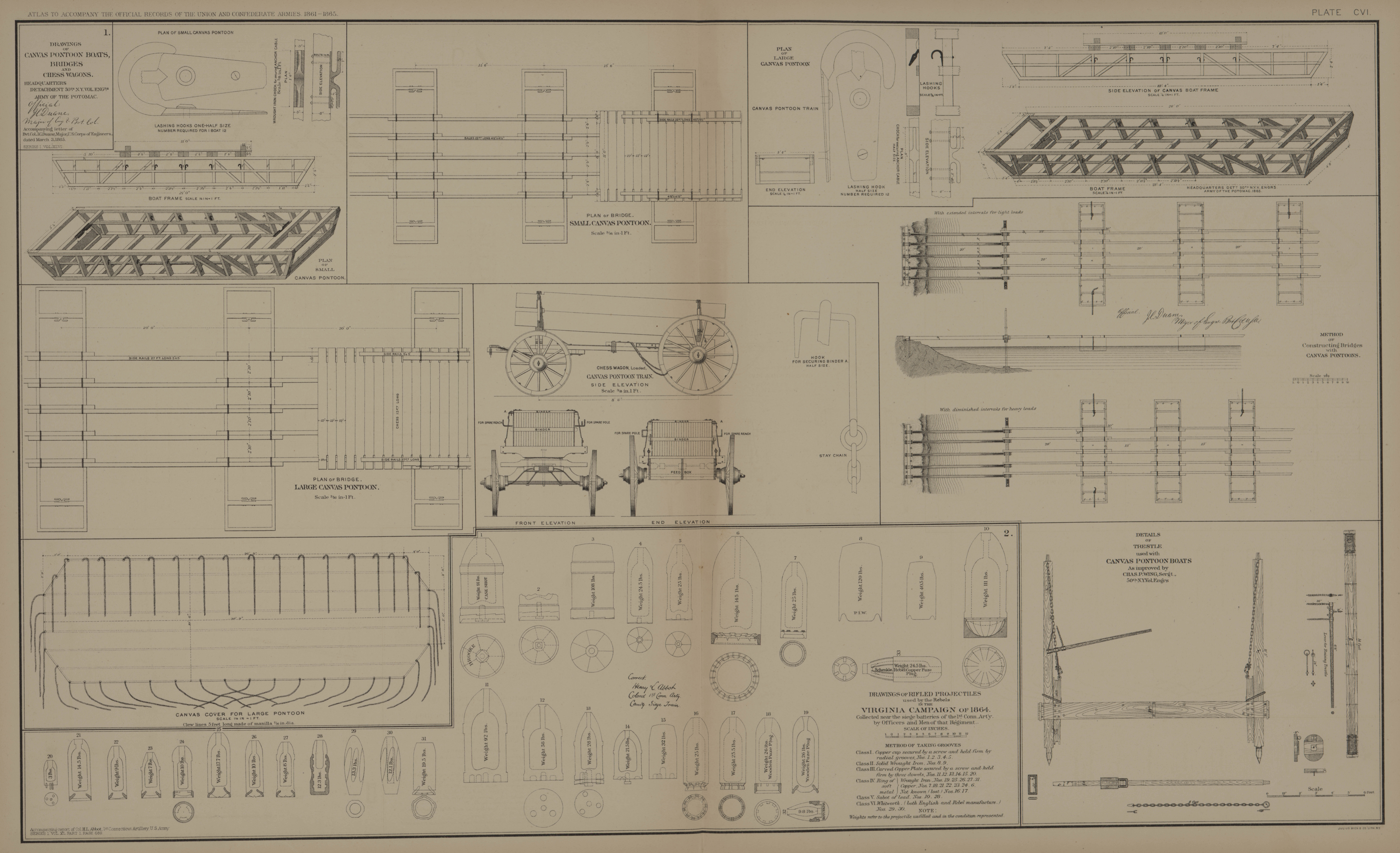

== Tactics ==
=== Overview ===
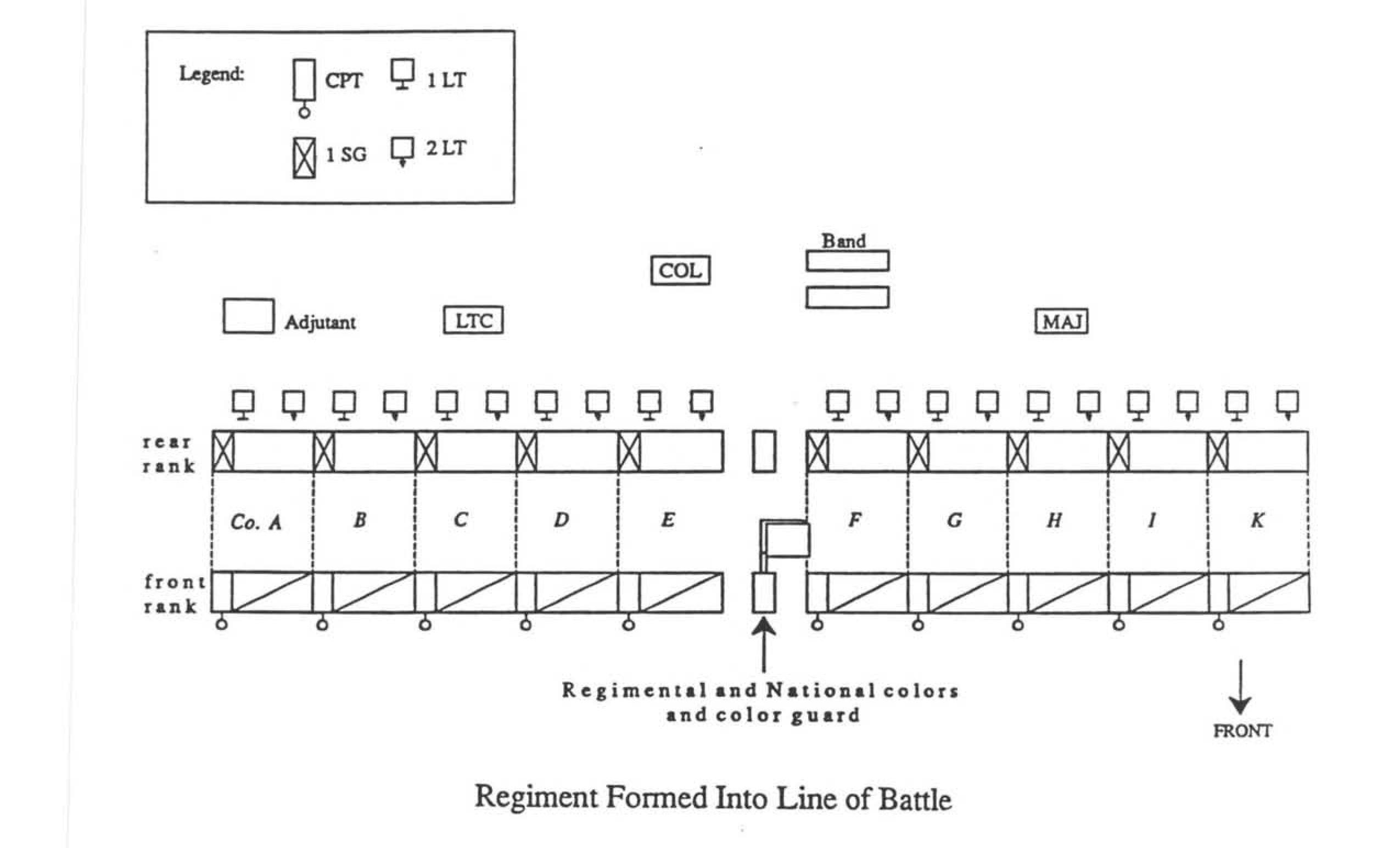
Deployment of a ten-company infantry regiment in line formation

The military tactics of the Confederate and Union armies were virtually identical during the Civil War, being derived from the same traditions which had originated in Europe. This type of warfare involved infantry marching shoulder-to-shoulder in lines, columns and other formations to deliver volley fire on the enemy before charging with bayonets. Such tactics were necessary in previous wars as the primary infantry weapon, the smoothbore musket, had an effective range of only 100 yards and was complex to reload. Cavalry and artillery played a supporting role to the infantry and used for both offensive and defensive roles. Cavalry were sent to scout for the enemy and protect the army's flanks and rear from attack, and during battle would charge into enemy infantry if they retreated or became disorganized. Artillery would blast holes in the enemy's lines to create gaps for the infantry or cavalry to exploit or to defend a position from the enemy's advance. These tactics were based on drill manuals, many derived from European manuals influenced by experience in the Napoleonic Wars, which formed the basis of individual and unit training. Many commanders had practical experience employing these tactics during the earlier Mexican-American War, but this experience was limited since the scale of fighting then was much smaller than the massive armies which eventually came to dominate the Civil War.

Before battle could begin the enemy had to be found first, a task most commonly carried out by the cavalry. They might also be located by setting up signal stations equipped with signal flags, sending out spies, interrogating prisoners of war, or reading the local newspaper. The Union took the novel approach of using hot air balloons to locate enemy troops during the early years of the war, but this was considered a cost-ineffective practice and later discontinued.

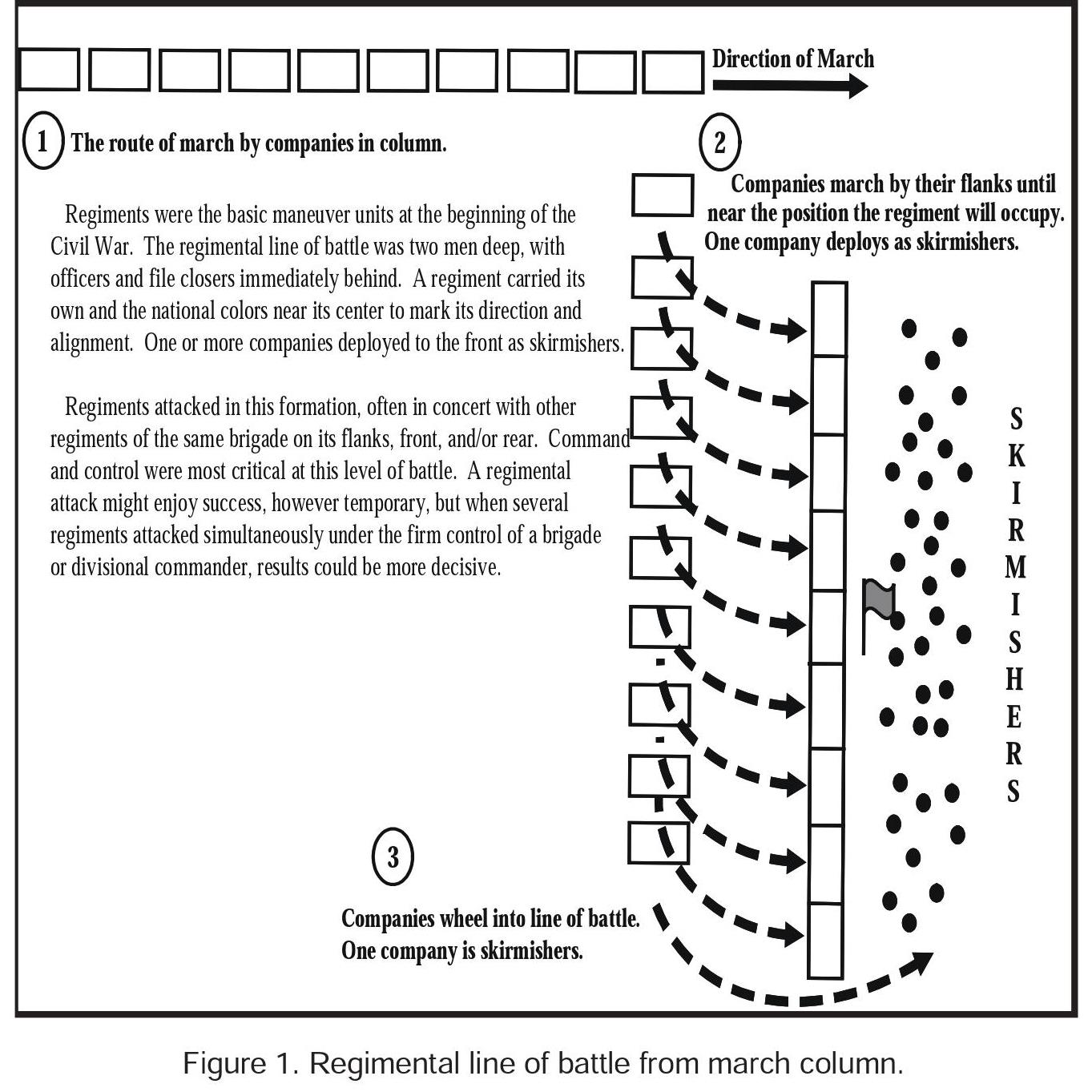
An infantry regiment transitions from column to line formation and deploys skirmishers

With the enemy located, infantry formed up in their battle lines as artillery and skirmishers harassed the enemy with preparatory fire. A flanking maneuver was the preferred method of attack but not always possible, making it often necessary to conduct a frontal assault. In this case feints were made in the hope of drawing off the enemy's attention. Prior to the Civil War and in its first year the regiment was the primary unit of maneuver on the battlefield, but it was soon superseded by the brigade in both armies, often as part of a larger division-based attack. Two or more of a division's brigades would lead the attack with the rest as a ready reserve, and its movements were often part of a larger coordinated attack by a corps.

Once the order to attack was given, successive lines of infantry would advance on the enemy at a walking pace until the first line got to within 200 yards or less, whereupon (ideally) they fired a single volley at the enemy and charged with bayonets to overrun their position. If successful, the first line would regroup in place as the succeeding lines passed through to attack the next position; if they became bogged down or forced to retreat, the next line would pass through to continue the attack. Much more often though, the attackers stopped within 100 yards of the enemy and begin exchanging fire with them until using up their ammunition. At this point they would either be driven off or press onwards with their bayonets. In the smoke and confusion of battle, a regiment's colors was an important rally point to help soldiers identify where their unit was and which direction it was headed. The colors also represented the unit's fighting spirit, and the fiercest fighting often centered around trying to seize the enemy's flag or defending your own from capture.

When on the defensive, the main line would be formed around a strong terrain feature (stone wall, embankment, etc.) or fieldworks, either of which ideally allowed for flanking fire. Supporting lines were placed behind the main line, on a hill overlooking it if possible but otherwise providing a ready reserve. Counter-battery fire would attempt to knock out the enemy's artillery while skirmishers harassed the attacker as they advanced. Once within range, the defending infantry attempted to drive off the enemy with superior firepower or, if timed right, a counter-charge of their own. Fieldworks were used extensively during the Civil War. Even outside of sieges, both armies made every effort to construct whatever defensive fortifications that time permitted. Examples included rifle pits, abatises, wire obstacles, land mines, and palisades. Truly impressive trench systems were constructed, often thanks to the widespread use of Black laborers by both armies.

Cavalry were rarely used in actual battle in the first years of the war, instead more often being used for scouting and raiding missions. By the latter half of the war cavalry on both sides had developed battle tactics unique from their European counterparts. Instead of masses of heavy cavalry charging into infantry, a cavalry force would leave a portion of its troopers mounted while the rest dismounted to engage in a firefight. The widespread employment of repeating rifles gave Union cavalry a particular advantage in this phase as it allowed them to use an early form of marching fire. If the firefight did not achieve success, the dismounted portion could clear any obstacles to make way for a cavalry charge by the mounted troopers. Such charges were capable of overrunning even defensive fortifications, but if unsuccessful the entire force could remount and use their mobility to attack at a later time from another direction. In this way an enemy could be defeated in detail as these successive attacks forced them to spread out and allowed isolated elements to eventually be overwhelmed.

=== Analysis ===
The traditional interpretation of Civil War tactics is that they were horribly outdated in the face of new revolutionary technology, namely the widespread use of the rifled musket. Where before the smoothbore musket had an effective range of 100 yards and longer-ranged rifles were specialist weapons, now most soldiers had a weapon with an effective range of 500 yards. This meant more firepower could be directed onto the enemy from greater distances, giving the defender a significant advantage as they could more easily repel infantry and cavalry charges. Frontal attacks were reduced to bloody messes and cavalry were forced to fight like mounted infantry. Artillery as well was forced to operate further away from enemy infantry to avoid being picked off by their rifles, reducing the effect of their firepower as they could no longer use canister shot offensively.

Many contemporaries did complain at what they saw as an inappropriate devotion to European tactical doctrine, citing it as being responsible for the terrible casualties suffered and a desire to develop more 'American' tactics. Such criticisms were picked up and continued by later historians such as James M. McPherson and Edward Hagerman, arguing that the rifle made the continued use of linear tactics obsolete and bloody. The ultimate result was that greater casualties were suffered, battles became less decisive, and trench warfare became more prevalent in the Civil war, presaging what was to come in World War I.

More recently, historians like Earl Hess and Allen Guelzo have challenged this interpretation, arguing the tactics used during the Civil War remained practical and were not rendered ineffective by the rifle musket. Hess cites independent studies of Civil War battle records by Paddy Griffith, Mark Grimsley and Brent Nosworthy which show that combat largely took place within or only slightly outside the effective range of smoothbore muskets, indicating no significant difference from previous wars. The reason for these continued short ranges were several: the use of black powder which fouled barrels and obscured the battlefield; a slower muzzle velocity for rifled muskets, resulting in a curved trajectory when attempting to hit targets further away; and a general lack of target practice on both sides of the conflict.

Paddy Griffith argues there is no evidence that the elaborate earthworks of the Civil War were any more necessary to deal with modern rifle weaponry than they had been in previous wars. Instead their increasing prevalence during the war was due to psychological reasons: a more risk-averse populace combined with officers influenced by the defensive-oriented teachings of West Point instructors like Dennis Hart Mahan. Stephen Starr could find no proof that cavalry in the Civil War made a conscious choice to change their tactics in response to the rifle and that they continued to fight both mounted and dismounted.

== Logistics ==
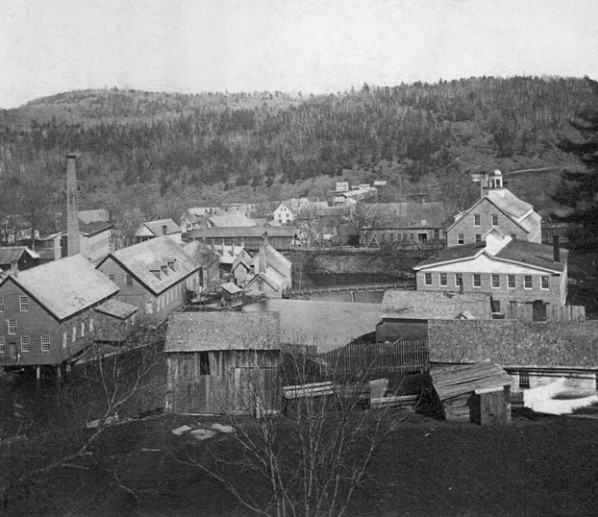
The Robbins and Lawrence Armory in Windsor, Vermont, one of the factories by which the North industrialized

Military logistics during the Civil War was greatly affected by the unprecedented size and scope of the conflict, as well as the widespread application of new technologies. Inventions such as canning and condensed milk promised to alleviate some of the issues faced by soldiers during long campaigns. Steam engines allowed for large numbers of men and materiel to be transported on a continental scale via steamship and railroad in a matter of days, while electrical telegraphy allowed for the coordination of these forces over the same vast distances.

Technologies like the steam engine and telegraphy, along with the ability to produce immense amounts of munitions and other warfighting material, were the direct result of the Industrial Revolution's transformative effect on the United States, particularly in the North where the majority of the nation's manufacturing capabilities were located. However, just as important as producing the arms and equipment was ensuring it got to the troops in a timely manner, requiring a level of leadership and administrative skill which had no precedent. Ultimately the North was successful in developing the infrastructure to arm, feed and clothe a million soldiers at once, and to maintain its armies across distances which had confounded Napoleon during his invasion of Russia.

=== Organization ===
Administration of the pre-war United States Army was handled by the staff bureaus of the Department of War. They were headquartered in Washington, D.C. and the heads of these bureaus reported directly to the Secretary of War. Each bureau or department acted independently of the other and set their own standards of operation. Of these, four were considered the "supply" departments responsible for the logistical support of the Army.

The Medical Department was responsible for acquiring and distributing medicine, medical equipment, hospital food and similar supplies. The Ordnance Department was responsible for the development, procurement, storage, distribution and repair of all ordnance and ordnance-related equipment such as limbers and caissons and accoutrements. The Subsistence Department was in charge of the purchase, storage and distribution of food rations and related items. And the Quartermaster Department was responsible for all other supplies not covered by another department like clothing, tents, horses and fodder. It was also responsible for any non-Ordnance vehicles (i.e. wagons, ambulances, traveling forges); constructing and maintaining Army buildings; and providing transportation services for the entire Army, including the other supply departments.

The Confederates adopted the same bureau system as the Federal government, including the four supply departments responsible for similar logistical functions. A fifth department, the Niter and Mining Bureau, was responsible for the raw materials necessary for producing ordnance. However, the bureaus suffered from a persistent shortage of experienced personnel during the war, while the political infighting and lack of coordination was even worse than in the Union Army. An inability to coordinate their efforts at all levels of administration only exacerbated the Confederates' precarious supply situation.

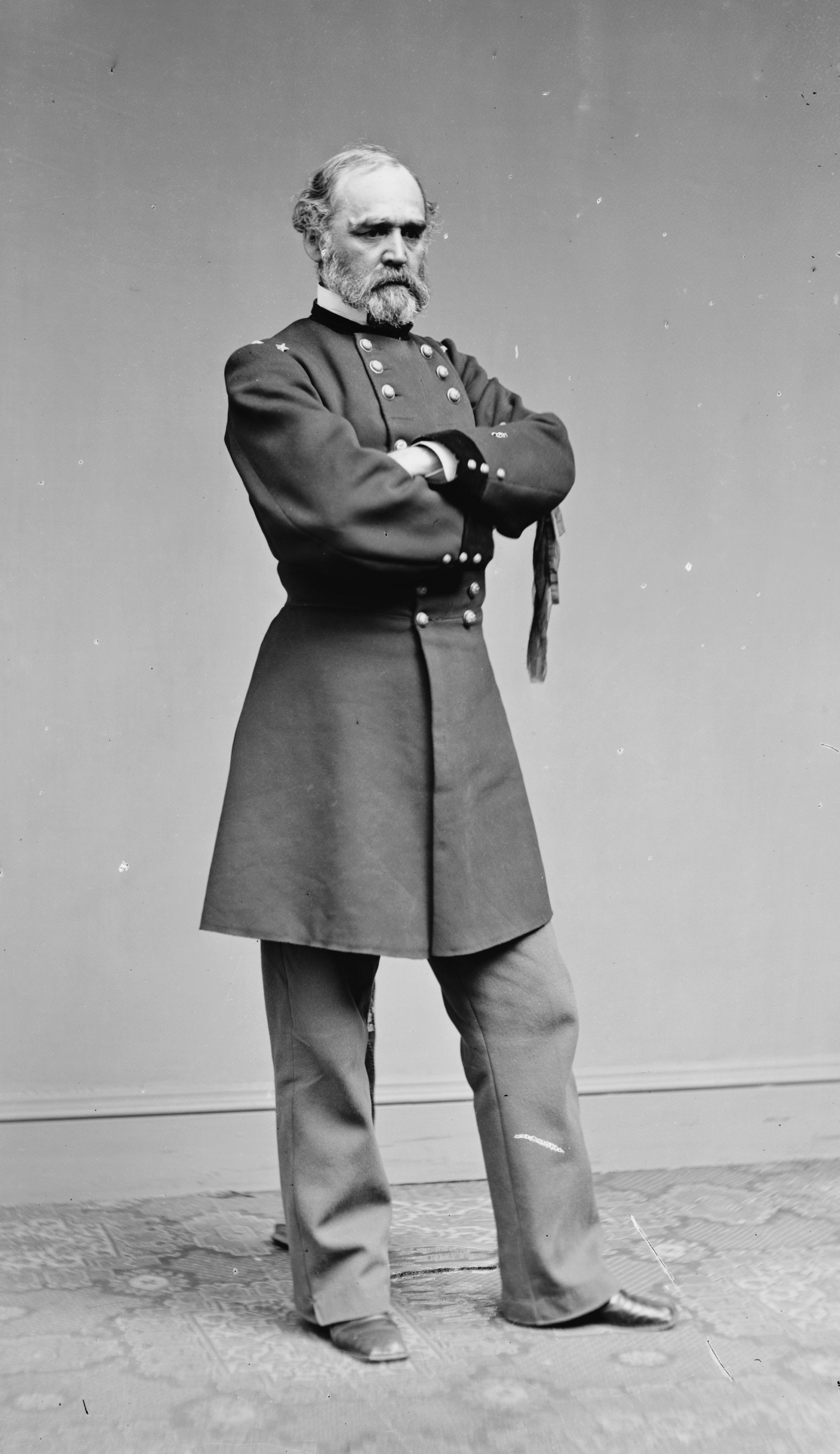
Quartermaster General Montgomery C. Meigs

The basic organizational unit was the geographic department, whose commander communicated directly with the bureaus for their needs, although as the war progressed some departments were combined under a "division" headquarters. Department commanders had total control over logistical operations within their area of responsibility. Depots were set up in major urban centers from which supplies would be procured – mostly via low-bid contracts initiated by the depot commanders themselves – and made ready for distribution to units in the field. Additional advanced and temporary depots would be set up at cities or transportation hubs closer to the fighting as needed to support ongoing operations. Despite their importance though, until 1864 many of these depots were commanded by mere captains.

Starting at the regimental level, each military unit had a number of logistical staff officers responsible for keeping their units provisioned. Once supplies arrived at an advanced depot via rail or steamship, these officers were responsible for organizing wagon trains to pick them up and take them to the field units. A regiment's quartermaster, commissary, and ordnance officers were selected from among its lieutenants, while those of larger units were supposed to be provided by the supply departments themselves. However, chronic shortages often required for line officers to be assigned to these duties, or for staff officers to cover multiple roles at once.

Additionally, with the exception of a small number of trained NCOs and specialists, there were no enlisted personnel assigned to help carry out the routine logistical work. Either civilian contractors had to be hired, or soldiers had to be reassigned from their line units, to perform these necessary duties. Civilians were not as reliable as Army personnel, but reassigning soldiers diminished the fighting power of their units. One alternative used by the Union Army was hiring African-Americans, including so-called "contraband" or freed slaves. In a variety of roles, from teamsters to ambulance drivers to hostlers, Black workers proved to be more trustworthy and often performed better. The Confederates requisitioned slaves to perform the same work, but doing so was considered a burden to the slaveowners as it decreased economic activity.

=== Classes of Supply ===
==== Arms and Ammunition ====
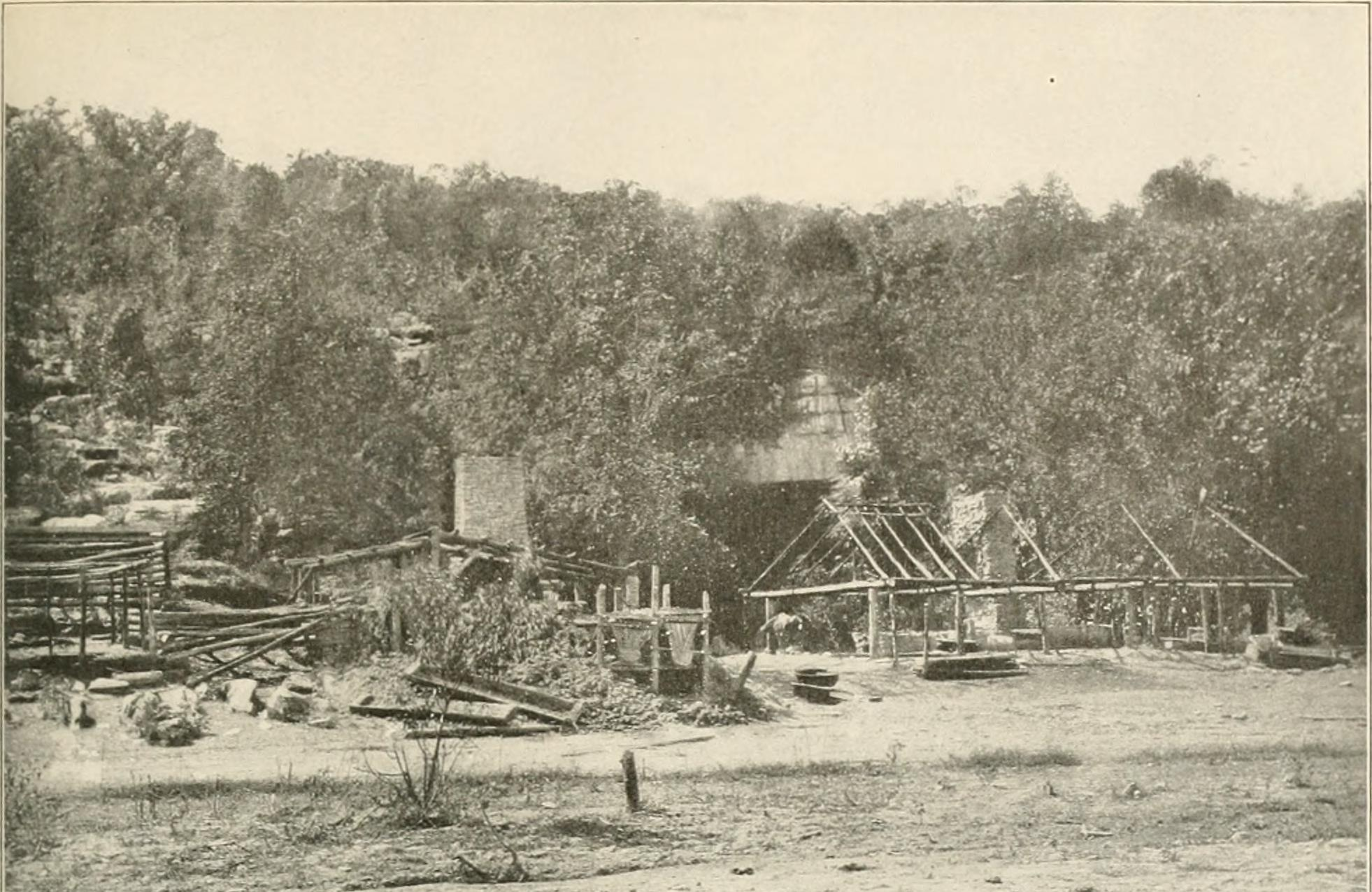
Ruins of a saltpetre factory in Tennessee destroyed in a cavalry raid

There was a pressing need for weaponry at the start of the war as neither side had sufficient quantities of modern firearms to equip their growing armies. Eventually this problem was alleviated through a combination of production at government arsenals and contracting with both domestic and foreign manufacturers. In this respect the North was better able to equip its forces, being the site of most of the nation's arms manufacturers with 28 arsenals, foundries and armories. In total, the North was able to furnish over four million small arms and melee weapons, over one billion rounds of small arms ammunition, nearly eight thousand artillery pieces and more than eight million artillery rounds during the war. Still, the South was able to adequately meet its needs by building up its industrial capacity with 20 arsenals and factories, salvaging captured Federal weapons, and gunrunning through the Union blockade.

There was no "standard" in the amount of ammunition carried by soldiers, being dependent on factors like availability and commanders' orders. On average though, an infantryman would have 200 rounds of ammunition for his rifle: 60 rounds were carried on their person – 40 in their cartridge box and the rest in pockets or knapsack – with the rest held in their unit's wagon train. These were packed in 1,000-round cases weighing 98lbs each. A typical cavalryman rode with 40 rounds for his carbine and 20 for his pistols. For artillery it depended on the model, but the standard ammunition chest for a 12-pounder Napoleon held 32 rounds, with four chests per gun and an equal amount normally carried in the train.

==== Clothing and Camp Equipment ====
Ensuring that soldiers were adequately clothed and equipped was an immediate issue at the war's beginning, but one quickly met by Northern quartermasters. The chief clothing manufacturer and depot for the US Army was the Schuylkill Arsenal in Philadelphia, with additional depots located in other major cities. Clothing and other equipment was either manufactured in-house or bought on contract from local suppliers, then shipped out to advanced depots for further distribution; on occasion goods would be shipped directly from the factory to troops in the field.

Similar depots were set up in the South to meet the needs of the nascent Confederate army, however Southern quartermasters had much greater difficulty in their task on account of the blockade's effectiveness and the lack of domestic industry. The result was that Confederate troops often had to make do with poorer-quality material or simply go without certain items altogether. Footwear shortages in particular were persistent and had a direct effect on the army's performance (as occurred during the Maryland Campaign), while home-dyed "butternut" clothing became associated with the Confederate uniform.

Tentage was a major concern for both armies, but canvas was typically in short supply and their transportation requirements significant (an infantry company required two wagons to carry enough pre-war Sibley tents to shelter everyone), resulting in tents often being discarded. Early in the war however, the shelter-half was introduced in answer to these concerns. Carried by the individual soldier, it could be used as a sleeping bag, lean-to, or combined with another half to form a two-person tent.

==== Food ====
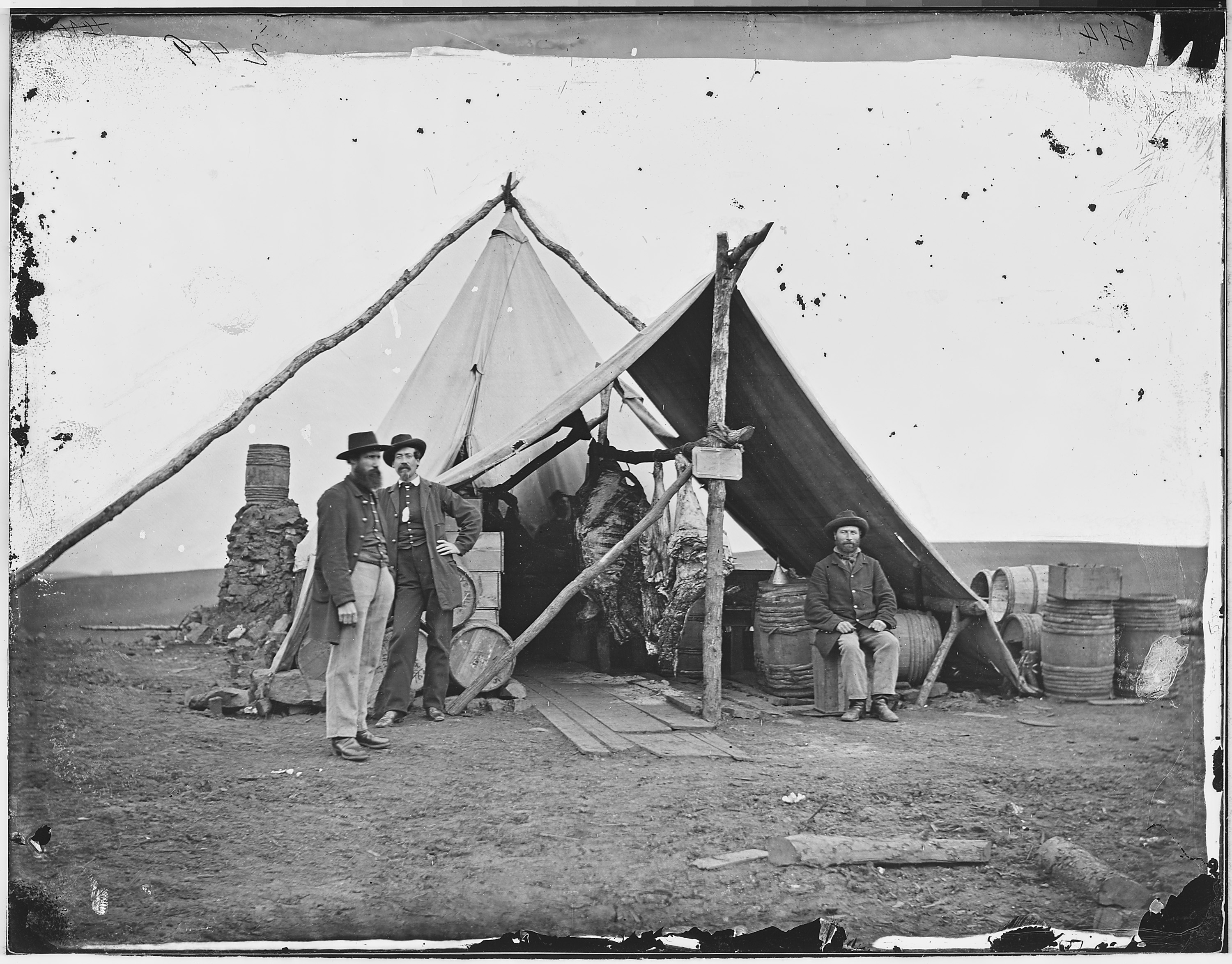
Beef being dressed at the regimental commissary

The Union rarely went without sufficient food for its troops, thanks to a highly effective depot system which procured and distributed the required number of rations (or, in the case of beef cattle, drove herds behind the advancing armies). Despite producing enough foods for their needs however, shortages were a frequent concern for the Confederacy due to inefficient administration and lack of transportation. Southern soldiers were more often forced to forage for their meals or hope to capture Union rations intact.

The standard daily ration for a Union soldier was 20 ounces of fresh or salt beef or 12 ounces of pork or bacon; 18 ounces of flour or 20 ounces of corn meal; 1.6 ounces of rice, or .64 ounces of beans, or 1.5 ounces of dried potatoes; 1.6 ounces of coffee or .24 ounces of tea; 2.4 ounces of sugar; .54 ounces of salt; and .32 gill of vinegar. The "marching" ration was lighter at 16 ounces of hardtack, 12 ounces of salt pork or 4 ounces of fresh meat, 1 ounce of coffee, 3 ounces of sugar, and salt. Officially the Confederate daily ration was similar with slight variations, but it was rarely issued in full due to shortages.

==== Medical Supplies ====
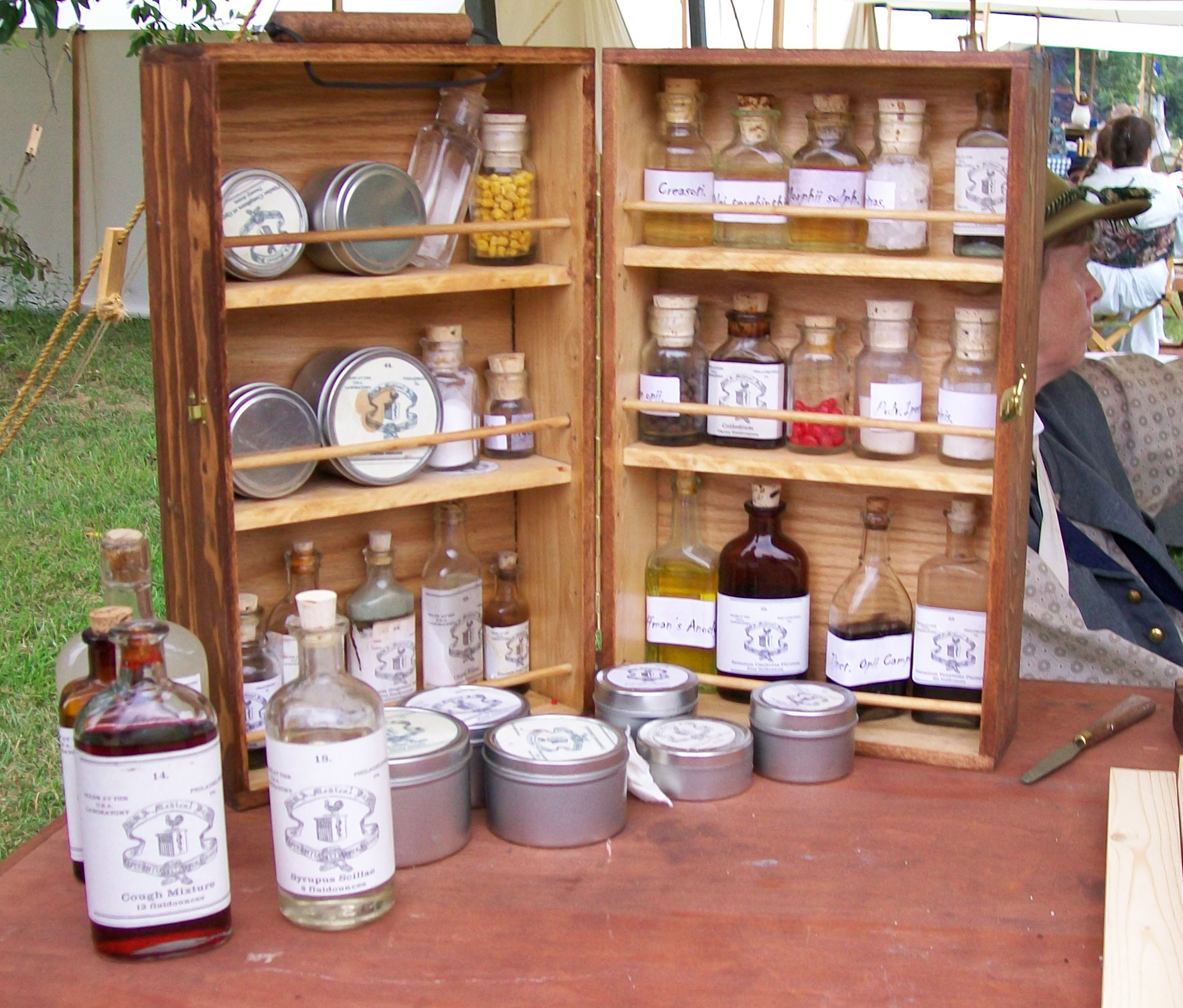
Recreation of a Civil War medicine cabinet

In both armies, the medical equivalent of a quartermaster was the medical purveyor. Purveyors were physicians responsible for acquiring, storing and distributing medicine and other supplies like surgical instruments, bandages, hospital bedding, and medical books. In the Union army, purveyors were assisted by medical storekeepers, skilled pharmacists who among other duties could act as purveyors in their absence.

Medical purveyors operated in the field or were assigned to a depot. Field purveyors were responsible for ensuring the armies they accompanied had sufficient medical supplies, while depot purveyors oversaw the purchase or manufacture of supplies, their storage, and their distribution to hospitals and armies in the surrounding area. The Union maintained two major depots in New York City and Philadelphia, with thirty subdepots established around the country. The Confederates initially set up nine districts, each with a depot, but the deteriorating military situation required many to relocate.

To address shortages and rising prices, both sides set up medical laboratories which could manufacture, test, and package medicine. Surgeon General William A. Hammond was responsible for establishing two laboratories for the Union, corresponding to the two major depots in New York City and Philadelphia. The Philadelphia lab was up and running by late April 1863, although the Astoria lab was not fully operational until February 1864. The labs likely saved the Federal government money by producing drugs at a lower cost, although the exact amount is unclear. The Astoria lab in particular was more troubled and controversial as its director was in frequent conflict with the local depot purveyor, and New York commercial manufacturers resented the competition. Both were closed shortly after the war ended.

The Confederacy established many more laboratories to meet the shortages caused by the Union blockade. While exact numbers are lost due to destroyed records, labs were known to be set up in Richmond, Virginia; Columbia, South Carolina; Arkadelphia, Arkansas; Atlanta and Macon, Georgia; Charlotte and Lincolnton, North Carolina; Mobile and Montgomery, Alabama; and possibly Little Rock, Jackson, and Knoxville. Confederate labs tended to have fewer and less quality equipment than their Union counterparts, resulting in worse quality in some of the medicine produced. Even when medicine was available, a lack in appropriate containers (jars, bottles, etc.) prevented it from being distributed. To try and address chronic shortages in vital medicines, civilians were encouraged to gather indigenous plants which could be used to make alternative remedies.

=== Transportation ===
Historian Earl Hess identified four primary means of transporting supplies during the Civil War: coastal shipping, riverboat shipping, rail transportation, and wagon trains. The first three were national in scale, being concerned with getting men and supplies close to the battlefield, and were either wholly or in part influenced by the steam engine. Wagon trains carried supplies for the last mile and accompanied armies in the field. Supplementing these were the use of pack animals, soldiers carrying their own gear, and cattle drives.

In the final fiscal year of the war (ending June 30, 1865) the Union's impressive logistics network was responsible for moving 3,982,438 passengers via rail, sea and river transport: 3,376,610 soldiers under orders, 201,106 soldiers on furlough, 256,693 prisoners of war, and 148,629 civilians. Another 716,420 animals were similarly transported: 407,848 horses; 123,448 mules; and 185,124 cattle. Lastly, a total of 9,458,871 tons of supplies were moved by various means, amounting to over 4.1 million tons of food, over 3.7 million tons of Quartermaster supplies, 1.3 million tons of Ordnance supplies, 90,000 tons of medical supplies, and 127,000 tons of miscellaneous items.

==== Coastal Shipping ====
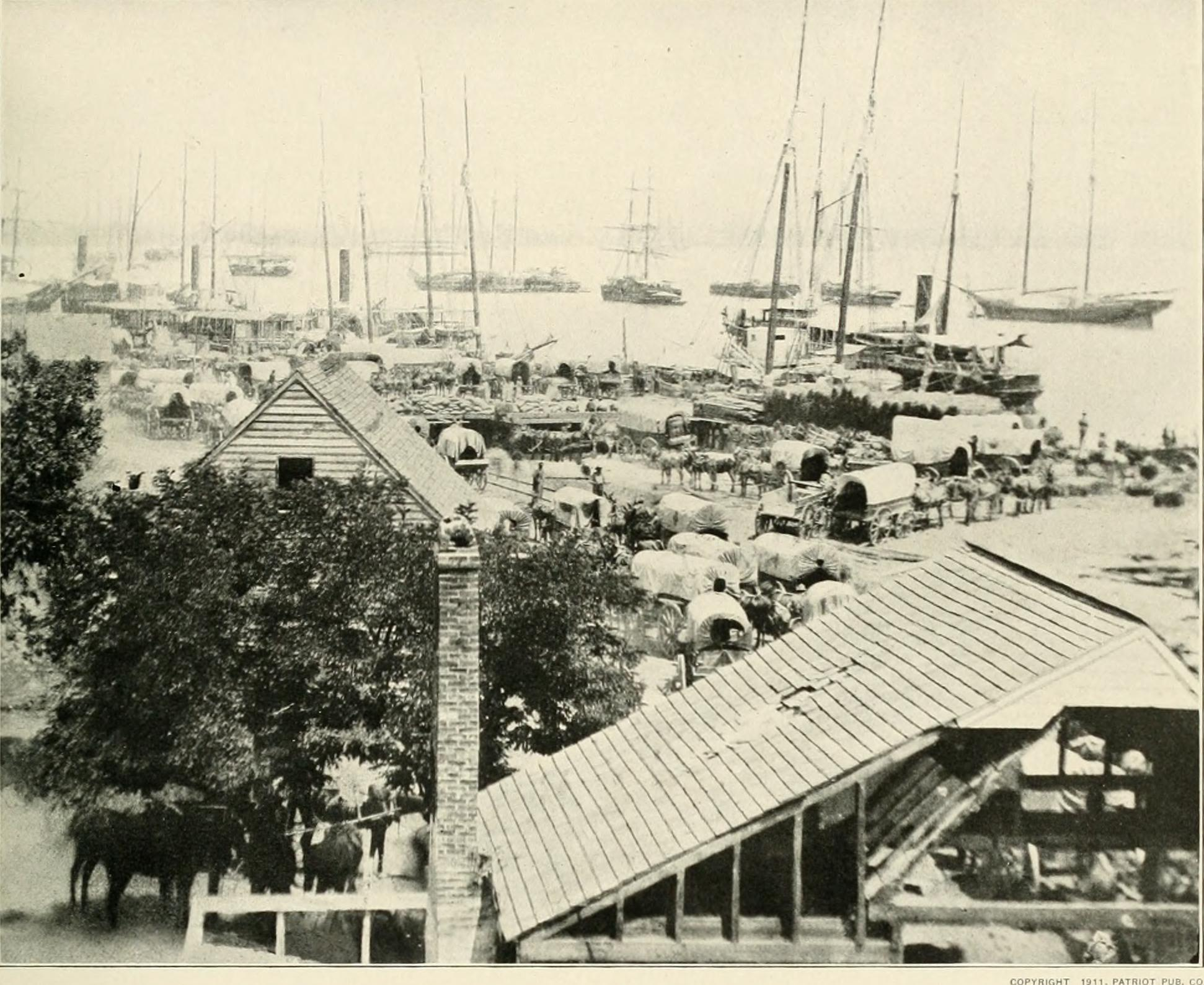
Supplies being unloaded at the docks of City Point in 1864

Thanks to their dominance at sea, coastal shipping played a major role in supporting Union forces. Perhaps the biggest demonstration of this was the unprecedented ocean-borne movement of the Army of the Potomac at the start of the Peninsula campaign. Between March 17 and April 8, a fleet of 113 steamships, 188 schooners and 88 barges ferried the Army of the Potomac from Perryville, Alexandria, and Washington to Fort Monroe. Out of the 121,500 men, 14,592 animals, 44 artillery batteries, and other equipment which made up this force, only eight mules died and nine barges were lost (although their cargo was saved).

By the last fiscal year of the war, the Union's Quartermaster Department had under charter or owned outright 719 vessels: 351 steamships, 89 sailing vessels, 111 tugboats and 168 barges. The total cargo capacity of this fleet was 224,984 tons, at a daily expense of $92,414. Earlier in the war, the process of purchasing and chartering was done by individual quartermasters (many with no experience in the industry), resulting in price gouging. Greater oversight was achieved in 1863 under the efforts of Quartermaster General Meigs and in 1864 he appointed the reliable George D. Wise to oversee all coastal and inland lake shipping.

The Confederates were never able to fully use coastal shipping on account of the US Navy's control of the sea, but where possible attempts were made to ship goods by this route. The exact size and scope of this effort are unknown, due in part to poor recordkeeping practices. A census of all shipwrecks of the time done by W. Craig Gaines however counts a total of 280 Confederate coastal ships. Many of these losses were the result of self-sabotage to prevent them from falling into Federal hands.

==== Riverine Shipping ====
Transportation by riverboat was a central feature of the Civil War's Western Theater, dominated as it was by the Mississippi River and its tributaries, although riverboats also played a role in the East with its various rivers and canals. There were an estimated 817 steamboats in the West in 1861, and they had an advantage over railroads in their ability to carry more freight. A typical Ohio River steamer could carry 500 tons of supplies and passengers, enough to support 70,000 men and 20,000 animals for a day. Steamboats however tended to be slower, especially during the dry season when water levels fell and many were forced to reduce their cargo capacity.

As elsewhere in military logistics, the Federal government went about creating an effective river-based transportation system on a hitherto unrivaled scale. Initially the purchase or chartering of boats was done by individual quartermasters, leading to much waste and abuse, but an important step was made early in the war when Lewis B. Parsons Jr. was given oversight of all steamship transportation along the Mississippi. Parsons was effective in combating fraud and managing the steamboats along the river such that his responsibilities gradually increased until 1864 when he was put in charge of all river and rail transportation. By the end of the war's last fiscal year, the Federal government controlled 114 steamboats and 486 barges in the West, making it larger than any other steamer company.

The Confederates also used steamboats in the West but to a lesser extent; nor was any single officer assigned to oversee the system, leaving it to individuals to manage as best they could. The list of shipwrecks compiled by Gaines gives a total of 125 Confederate river craft, a majority of which they destroyed themselves to avoid capture. Lewis Parson's own accounting of all Western steamboats lost during the war is 327, a majority of which were due accidents.

==== Rail Shipping ====
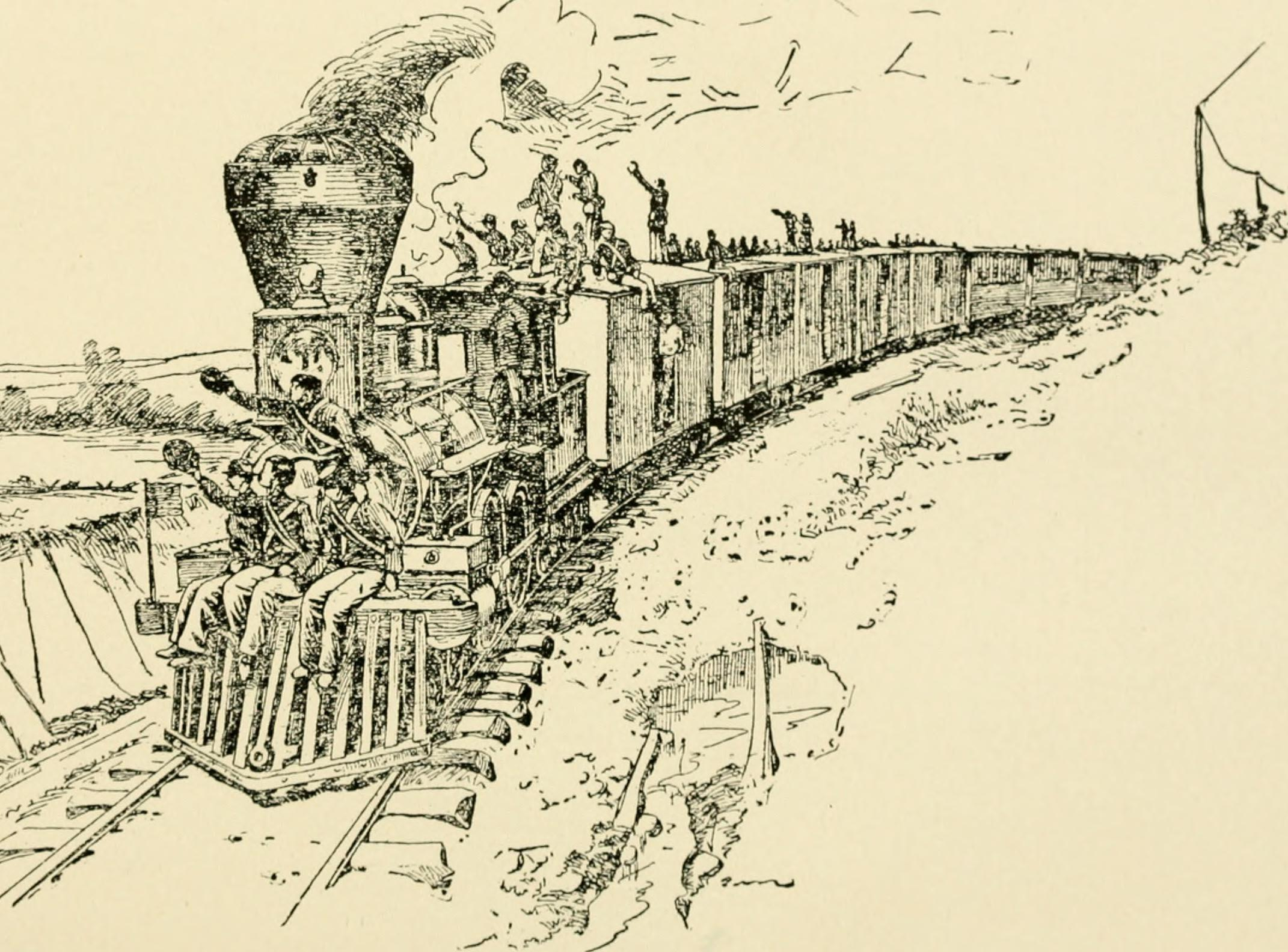
The 7th Ohio Infantry Regiment traveling by train from Camp Dennison to western Virginia

The American Civil War was the first 'railroad war' in history, due in no small part to the fact that in 1860 the United States had over 30,000 miles of tracks, more than any other country. The typical American freight train was composed of a 4-4-0 steam locomotive pulling 17 boxcars, each capable of carrying 5 to 10 tons of freight. A typical passenger train had 10 passenger cars, each capable of comfortably seating 50 to 60 passengers. Trains could travel 50 to 60 miles on one cord of wood or one ton of coal at an average speed of up to 22.6 miles per hour, though more often they were forced to travel slower.

The Union started the war with the clear advantage in terms of rail transportation, having a majority of the nation's track milage and railroad companies. Just as important however was an effective means of administrating the vast rail network under a centralized authority to ensure supplies arrived in a timely manner. Towards this effort, Secretary of War Edwin Stanton was instrumental in hiring competent civilians with managerial experience, giving them military commissions, and allowing them to administer the railroads unhindered with the authority of the United States Military Railroad (USMRR). When the war was over the USMRR was the largest railroad conglomerate in the world with 50 rail lines totaling 2,600 miles of track, 433 locomotives and 6,650 cars.

Although the act creating the USMRR also gave the Federal government the right to seize any railroad in the country, it preferred to restrict this power to Southern roads taken in the course of the war. Instead, the government sought to work together with Northern railroad companies to meet its needs and negotiate fair rates for shipping soldiers and goods. Northern companies for their part were happy with this arrangement, partly out of patriotism, partly due to the profits they could realize, and partly from the very real threat that seizure of their roads represented.

Conversely, the Confederates were at a serious disadvantage in rail transportation when the war began. There were only 9,000 miles of track in the Confederacy and most of it ran north–south with no connecting lines. There were few factories in the south capable of producing locomotives, cars or rails, and they were incapable of meeting the demands imposed by the war: an estimated 49,000 tons of rails were needed by the South every year but it could only produce 20,000 tons total from two factories. Most railroad mechanics in the South were actually Northerners, and many promptly fled at the conflict's onset.

This state of affairs was only compounded by inefficient management of what railroad resources the South did possess. Most Southern lines were small, highly centralized and jealously guarded by their managers in the Antebellum period, meaning few had experience coordinating operations on the size necessary for the war. Although the Confederate government granted itself the authority to seize railroad property, for ideological reasons it was unwilling to do so. Aware of this, Southern companies were at an advantage in negotiations with the government for shipping rates while simultaneously giving preference to private shipping. While there were instances of efficient and timely movement of men and goods, a lack of coordination and resources were the overall themes of Confederate rail transportation.

== Engineers ==
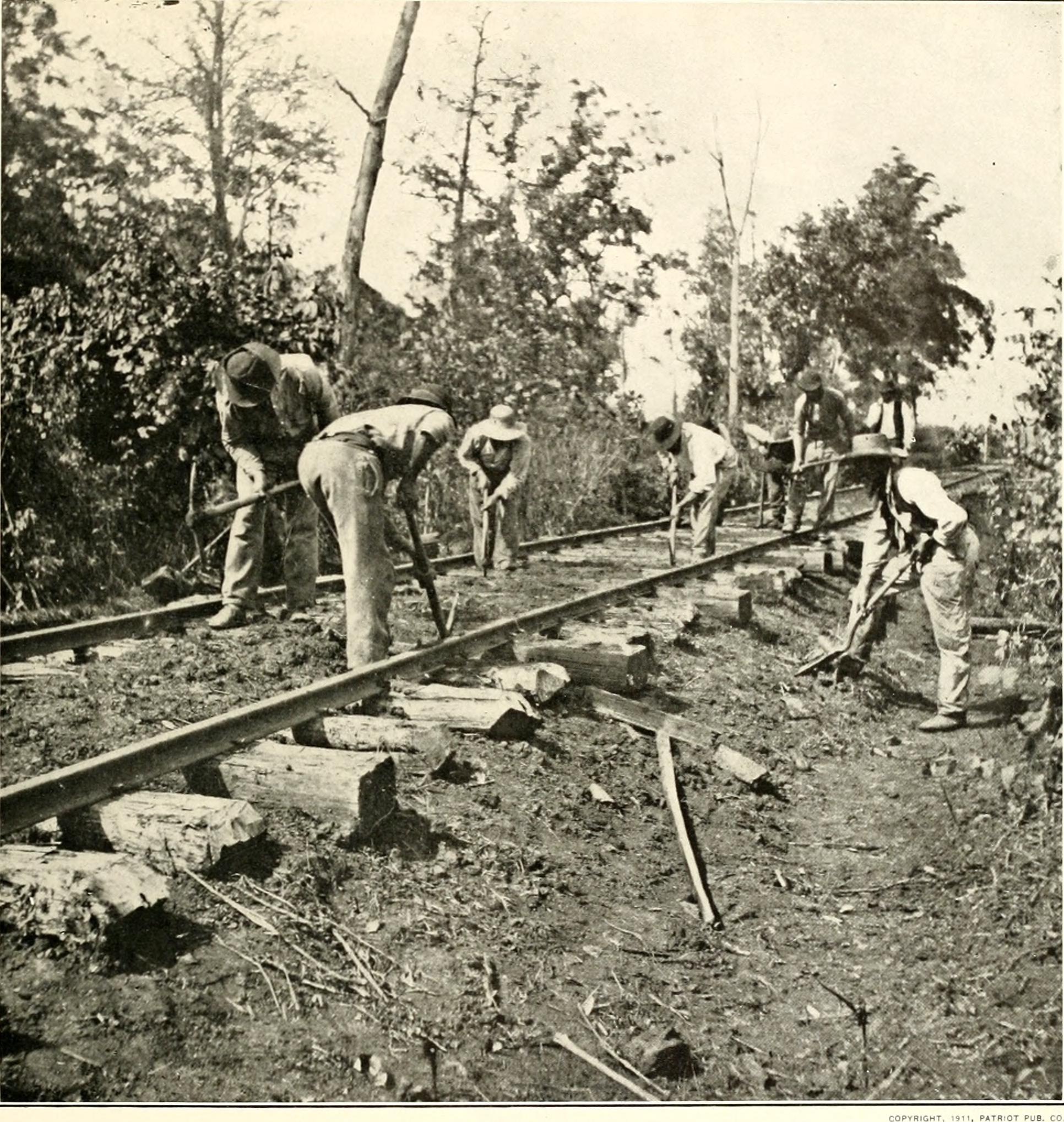
Contraband laborers repairing railway track near Murfreesboro after the Battle of Stones River

Military engineers performed many vital missions for both sides of the Civil War. Their tasks included constructing fortifications and earthworks; repairing and building roads, bridges and railways; demolishing obstacles both natural and man-made; and conducting reconnaissance and surveying missions to create desperately-needed maps. Professionally trained military engineers were highly valued but few in number, requiring many civil engineers to be commissioned as volunteers and help carry out the necessary work. Although complex projects such as constructing forts and pontoon bridges required the specialized skills of trained engineers, many simple tasks like clearing roads were performed by regular troops either on their own or under the supervision of an engineer. Such troops could be organized into special pioneer units.

While both sides started the war with inadequate numbers of engineering troops, the North had a larger supply of men with appropriate training: by 1860, there were seven times more carpenters, factory workers, and engineers in the North than in the South. This larger pool of skilled craftsmen allowed it to greatly increase the number of regular engineers in service and raise a number of volunteer engineering regiments. In the South meanwhile, the small number of engineering officers grew more slowly and were hampered by lack of sufficient manpower and resources such as money and iron. Slave labor could help offset this deficiency, but slaveowners were loath to lend out their workforce as doing so reduced their economic output. Even as the Confederate Congress authorized the conscription of slaves as a labor force, state and local officials continued to resist efforts to draft their slaves.

Historian Thomas F. Army argues the North's ability to sustain military operations deep within Confederate territory and thereby win the war was thanks to its large pool of trained civil engineers and mechanics, and that this advantage was not solely due to a larger population but also to a greater emphasis on public education. Northern governments recognized that an educated citizenry was not just a moral good, but necessary for the development of an industrialized economy. Common schools, agricultural fairs, lyceum meetings and mechanics' institutes led to the spread of knowledge and gave Northern workers the opportunity to improve their station in life. Thus by 1860 the 'western' states of Ohio, Indiana and Illinois boasted a combined total of 5,000 civil and military engineers, 43,000 carpenters, and 4,000 ironworkers; in comparison Virginia, North and South Carolina combined had only 1,300 civil and military engineers, 14,000 carpenters, and 880 ironworkers.

Conversely, he argues that slavery had a negative effect on Southern education and worked to limit the pool of trained engineers and mechanics available to the Confederacy. The political elite had a paternalistic worldview and made a conscious effort to limit the spread of knowledge which might cause citizens to start questioning the "peculiar institution." With few exceptions very little investment was made in public education, and what opportunities did exist were mostly focused on providing a classical education to offspring of the planter class. There were educated engineers and mechanics in the South, and even slaves were taught to become skilled craftsmen, but they were simply too few in number.

=== Organization ===
==== Union ====
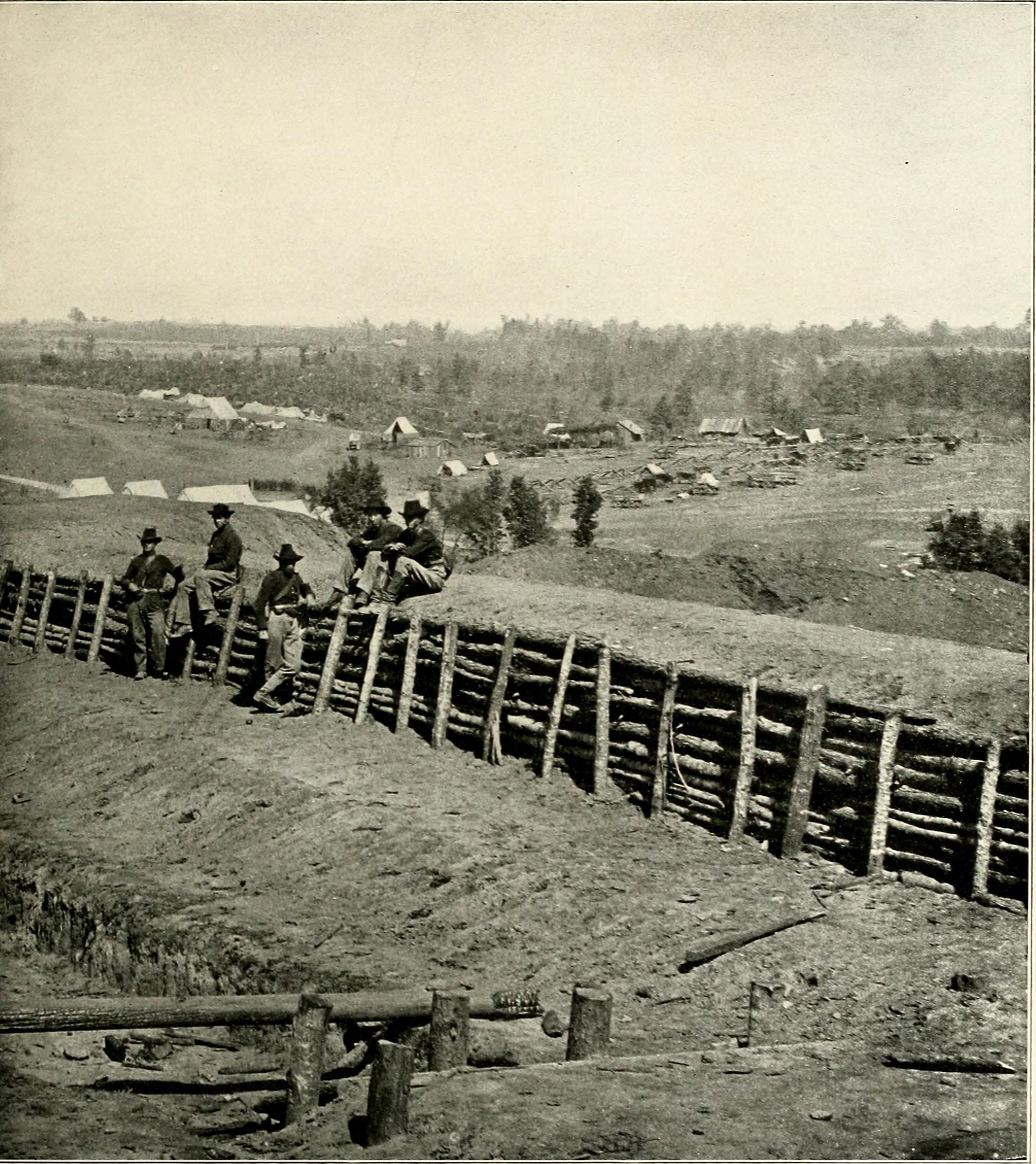
Men of the 1st Michigan Engineers regiment resting outside Atlanta

When the Corps of Engineers was permanently established in 1802, chief among its responsibilities was constructing and maintaining the nation's coastal forts and running the United States Military Academy. A separate Corps of Topographical Engineers was permanently established in 1831 specifically with the mission of mapmaking. Both however were too few in number when war broke out: the Corps of Engineers numbered only 48 officers (eight of whom resigned to join the Confederacy) and a single company of engineer troops, while the Topographical Engineers numbered 45 officers (of whom seven resigned). Congress resisted recruiting more engineers at first as their pay was much greater than normal troops, but after the disaster of First Bull Run, they authorized an expansion of both corps and the recruitment of three more engineer companies, together forming the US Engineer Battalion (later renamed the 1st Engineer Battalion). As their mission largely overlapped each other, Congress eventually merged the Topographical Engineers into the Corps of Engineers in 1863 and expanded its size to 105 officers.

This was still not enough to meet the engineering needs of the Union, and so with reluctance Congress agreed to accept volunteer engineer troops in October 1861. Among the first to be accepted were the 15th New York Engineer Regiment and 50th New York Engineer Regiment, which together with the US Engineer Battalion formed the Volunteer Engineer Brigade for the Army of the Potomac. Additional volunteer engineer units would serve in the Western theater, including the Engineer Regiment of the West, the 1st Michigan Engineers and Mechanics Regiment, and Patterson's Independent Company Kentucky Volunteer Engineers.

Further supplementing the regular and volunteer engineers, line units were sometimes assigned to specific engineering projects or to carry out engineering duties for specific lengths of time; this was more common in the West were engineers were fewer in number. For example, during the Vicksburg campaign, Company I of the 35th Missouri regiment was designated as the Army of the Tennessee's pontoon company. Line units would also detail soldiers from within their ranks to form company-sized detachments of pioneers or combine them into a "pioneer corps" for their parent division. Many Black laborers were also hired to perform pioneer duty.

==== Confederacy ====
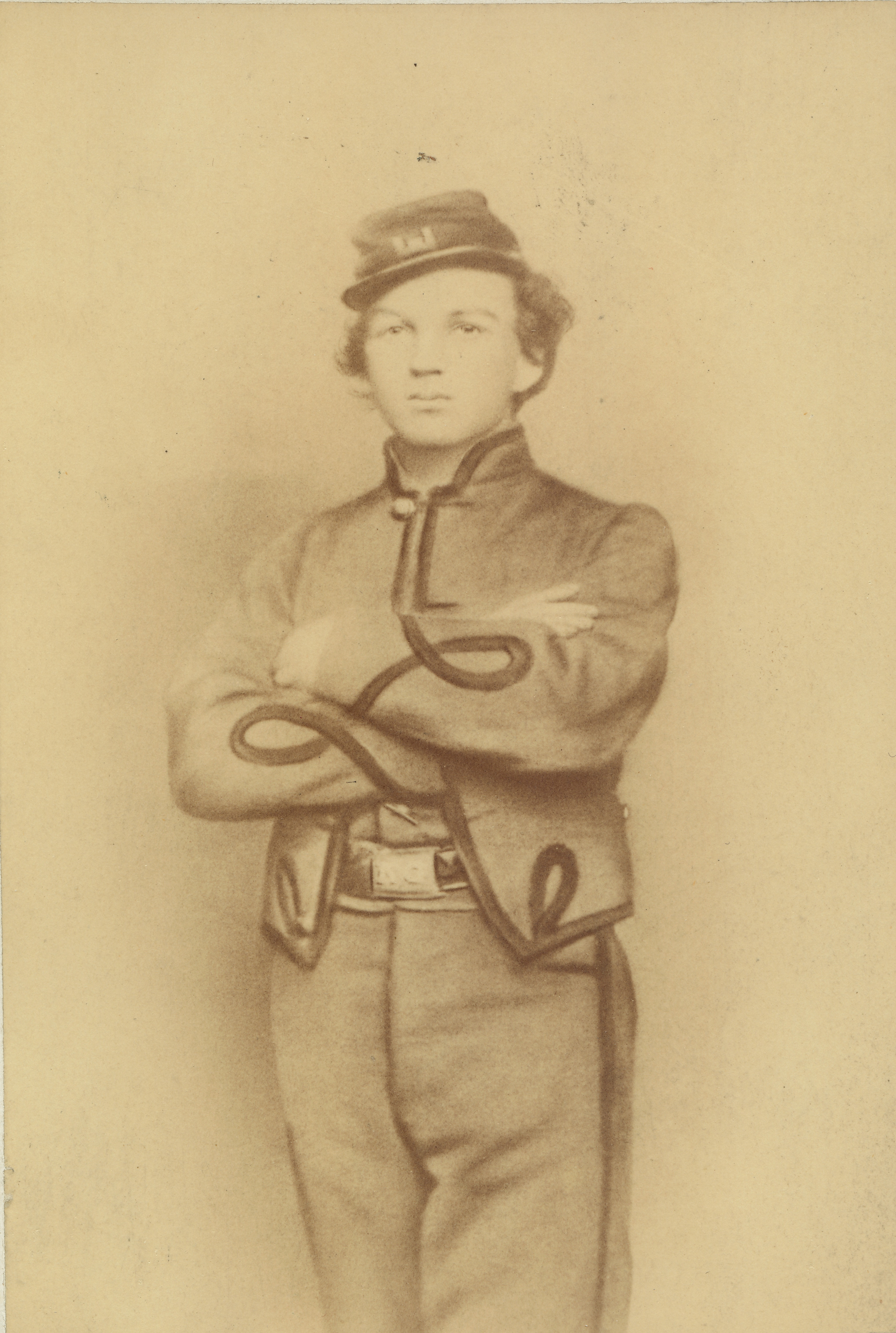
An engineer sergeant of the Missouri State Guard

The Confederate Corps of Engineers was established in March 1861 with just five officers and a company of 100 troops; in May that number was increased to 20 officers and a second company for 200 troops. Too few of a force even in peacetime, Judah P. Benjamin convinced the Confederate Congress to authorize the creation of a Provisional Corps of Engineers in December. Meant to last for only the duration of the war, it was initially authorized 50 officers (no higher in rank than captain) before being doubled in April 1862 and the rank limitation removed by the end of the year. Unfortunately in the eyes of Jeremy F. Gilmer, chief engineer of the Confederacy, only 20 of the Provisional Corps officers could rightfully be called engineers, while many of the rest were not worth their pay. To compensate for this deficiency, he was able to convince Congress to increase the number of regular engineer officers to 120 in 1863, and to gradually increase his budget, from a paltry $1 million in 1861 to $20 million by 1864.

While the Confederates made every effort to recruit engineer officers into their ranks, they were less diligent in recruiting engineer troops. In December 1862 Gilmer proposed the creation of four engineer regiments, to be split between four theaters of operation: the Gulf and Atlantic coast, the Mississippi Valley, Tennessee, and the Army of Northern Virginia. Congress approved this plan in March 1863, and recruitment began in May: troops were to be recruited from among the army ranks (each company sourcing from a single division) while officers were to already hold commissions within the Engineer Corps or be line officers with engineering experience. Robert E. Lee put a temporary hold on recruiting in the aftermath of the Battle of Gettysburg however, fearful it would weaken his already depleted forces, until a compromise could be reached.

The 1st Confederate Engineers regiment joined the Army of Northern Virginia by Spring 1864, although it did not compare favorably to its Union counterparts: only five of the regiment's eleven companies could build a pontoon bridge, versus every company in the Volunteer Engineer Brigade being trained to do so, and only one in ten men were classified as skilled craftsmen and artisans (artificers), against which one in four among the 15th New York Engineers were so ranked. The 2nd Confederate Engineers existed in name only, with just two companies raised, and so fell under the command of the 1st Engineers. The 3rd Confederate Engineers joined the Army of Tennessee in late spring 1863, but only eight of the intended nine companies were raised, and only five could be considered effective bridge builders. The 4th Confederate Engineers was formed in the summer of 1864 but could only muster three companies, was scattered across the Trans-Mississippi Department, and eventually broken up early the next year. A further eight undersized companies were formed and spread out across the southeast under the command of local officers.

As with the Union Army, the rebels relied heavily on regular infantry and Black laborers to do much of the actual engineering work. Units of designated pioneers were created on an informal basis by brigade commanders early in the war, until the practice was institutionalized in January 1863 by President Davis, with General Lee designating a pioneer company for each division. Black workers, both free and enslaved, were impressed to build fortifications protecting Southern cities. A formal process for impressing slaves to work for the Confederacy was instituted in March 1863, setting terms for length of service and compensation owed to slaveowners, but it was unpopular among the owners as their workforce was sorely missed during planting and harvesting season. When Davis ordered the hiring or impressment of 20,000 slaves in February 1864, it brought in thousands of new workers to shore up the defenses of Richmond and Atlanta, but created so much resentment that several state officials refused to help implement the order.

== Communications ==
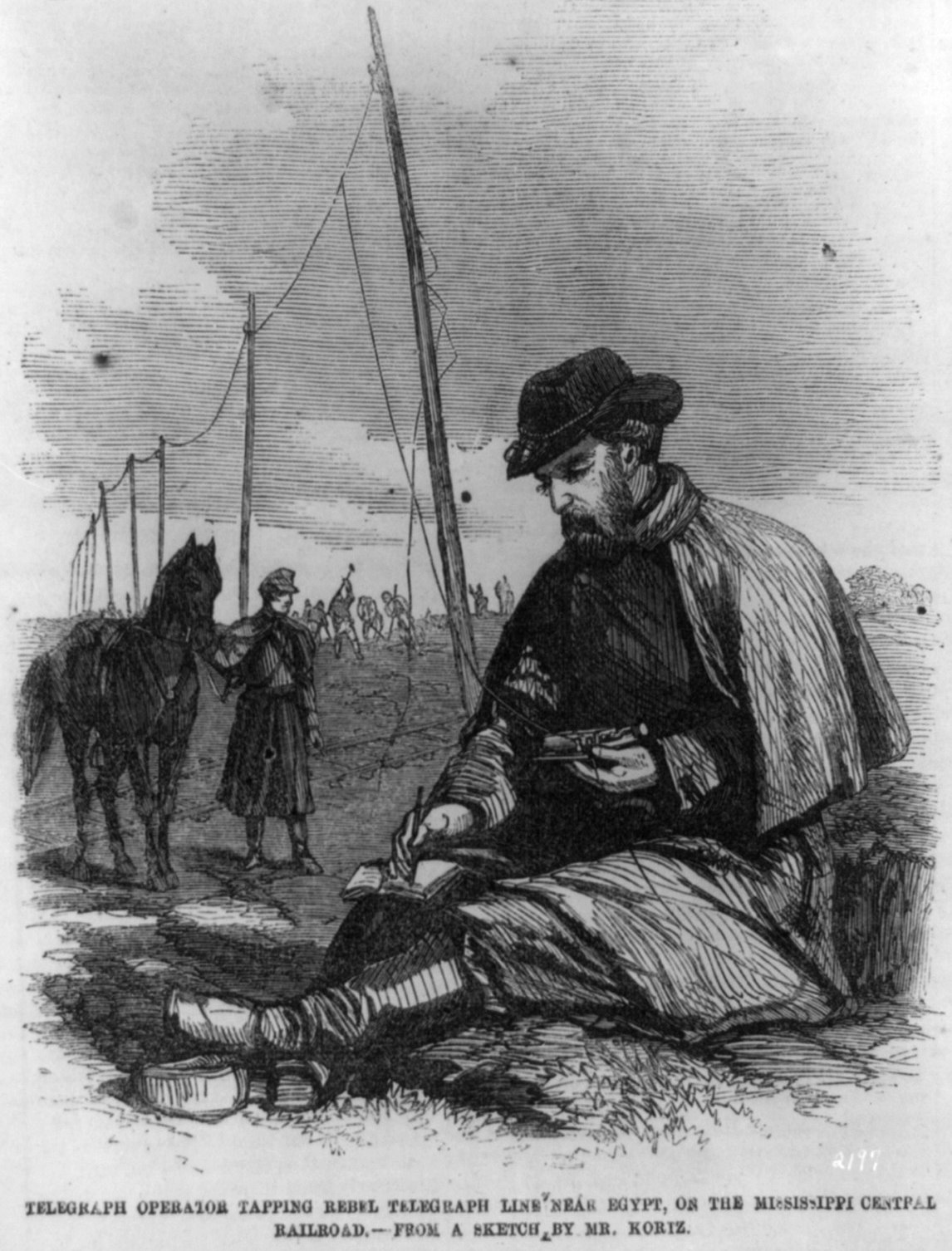
Wiretapping during the Civil War

Military communications during the Civil War was a unique mix of time-tested methods and brand-new technologies. Couriers, whether that be a staff officer on horseback or a runner on foot, were the principal form of tactical communications on the battlefield. Supplementing them were optical communication methods, including flags, flares or torches, although these were chiefly used at the operational level of war. Perhaps the most transformative was electrical telegraphy, which allowed instantaneous communication across vast strategic distances, although it could be used at the operational and even tactical levels.

Recognizing the importance of communications, both sides set up their own signal corps to handle this vital function. Major Albert J. Myer had lobbied for and been appointed to lead the US Army's Signal Corps in 1860. Although the Signal Corps consisted of just Myer at first, it eventually grew to a force of thousands by war's end. However, Myer's attempt at assuming greater control over field telegraphy put him in contention with the U.S. Military Telegraph Corps and its patron Secretary of War Stanton, who relieve Myer of duty in November 1863. Meanwhile Edward Porter Alexander, who had been Myer's assistant, helped form a Confederate Signal Corps in April 1862 which grew in size to rival its Union counterpart.

The use of couriers was often the most or only viable method of communication on the battlefield, but it could be fraught with many difficulties. Assuming the messenger wasn't killed, captured, or otherwise delayed on their mission, the message might be misinterpreted, or the situation might have changed such that the message was no longer relevant. These problems were well illustrated during the Vicksburg Campaign. At the Battle of Champion Hill, General Grant issued an order to John A. McClernand to bring his corps into action against the enemy, but because the courier chose to travel by road instead of cross-country the order was delayed by four hours. Another danger was demonstrated before the battle on May 13 when Joseph E. Johnston issued orders to John C. Pemberton to move his troops: one of the three messengers sent was actually a spy who delivered the message to Grant instead!

The wigwag flag signaling system was used by both sides of the conflict; unsurprising as it had been developed by Myer with Alexander's help. Signal stations would be set up on the highest point of terrain or atop specially constructed signal towers, creating a chain of stations along which messages could be sent. Such exposed positions allowed signalers to report on any enemy movement while simultaneously putting them in constant danger of being picked off by snipers or artillery. The nature of these messages also meant the enemy could read them as well, necessitating the early use of encryption. Because the navy used a different flag signal system, army officers would be stationed on ships to help coordinate naval gunfire support. Colored lights and rockets, or signal guns, could also be used to transmit prearranged messages to commanders.

An extensive telegraph network had been constructed in the United States prior to the war, and so both sides started with relatively equal capabilities. However the South lacked the resources to produce additional telegraph wires and so could not expand their network. Electrical telegraphy allowed for direct and immediate communication between the different field armies and their respective capitals, even down to individual corps commanders. Telegraph lines could be cut though, or the enemy could "tap" into the line directly, requiring the use of encryption here as well. Myer had attempted to expand the role telegraphy played on the battlefield with the adoption of the Beardslee Telegraph, but when he was sacked by Stanton this effort was abandoned.

== Medical support ==
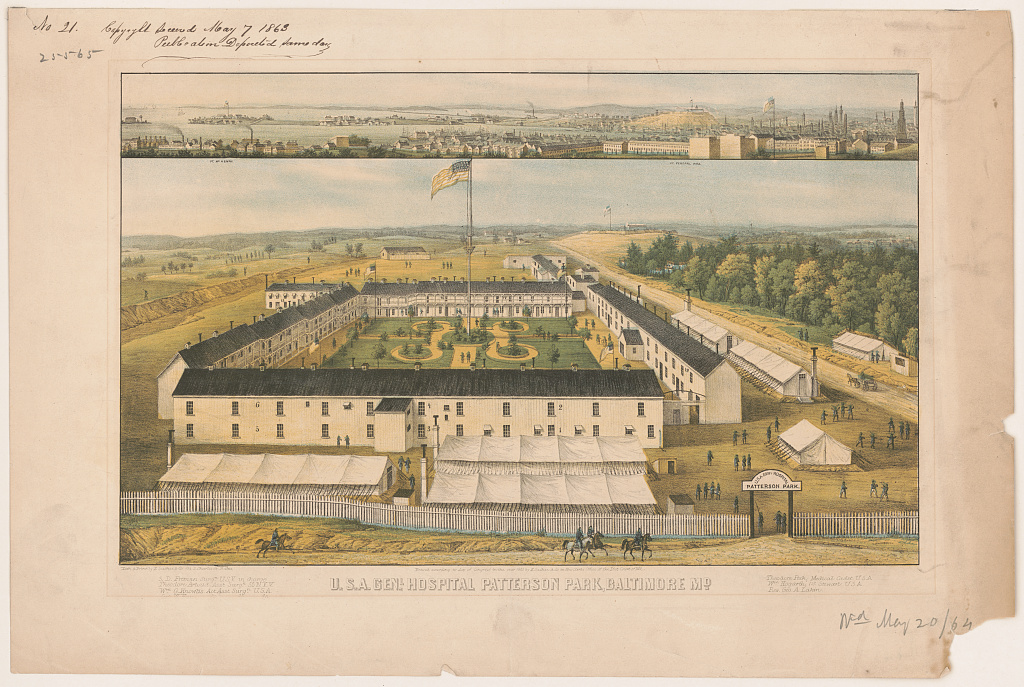
Patterson Park general hospital

The state of military medicine during the Civil War was poor in the beginning on account of inadequate administrative planning and lack of medical knowledge. The pre-war Medical Department was ill-equipped to deal with the sudden influx of vast numbers of citizen-soldiers and its Confederate counterpart had to be created from scratch. Screening recruits for pre-existing conditions was poorly done; a lack of education in Field Hygiene and Sanitation meant large gatherings of soldiers (many unaccustomed to adverse environmental conditions) became breeding grounds for diseases; and concepts such as aseptic surgery or germ theory were largely unknown. Improvements were made during the war, but in the end twice as many soldiers died of disease as from actual combat.

Both medical departments were similarly organized, headed by a surgeon general with a small administrative staff. Each field army was assigned a medical director who reported directly to the surgeon general and were responsible for ensuring their army's medical needs were met. Each subordinate unit down to the brigade level was also assigned a medical director, while each regiment was assigned a surgeon and one to two assistant surgeons. Northern medical directors also had responsibility for the hospitals within their area of operations, while in the South the separate position of medical director of hospitals was established. Additional personnel included medical inspectors who audited the medical system and medical purveyors charged with acquiring and distributing medicine.

Neither side possessed a formal system of casualty evacuation at the start of the war. Hired civilian ambulance drivers proved to be insubordinate, and while a wounded soldier's fellows could help him off the battlefield, doing so removed them from the fight as well. Musicians pulled double duty as stretcher bearers, but their performance in this role was inconsistent. William A. Hammond and Jonathan Letterman were ultimately responsible for creating the U.S. Ambulance Corps which effectively solved the problem for the Union. The Confederates also set up a similar corps, but shortages in ambulances and animals to pull them made the task more difficult.

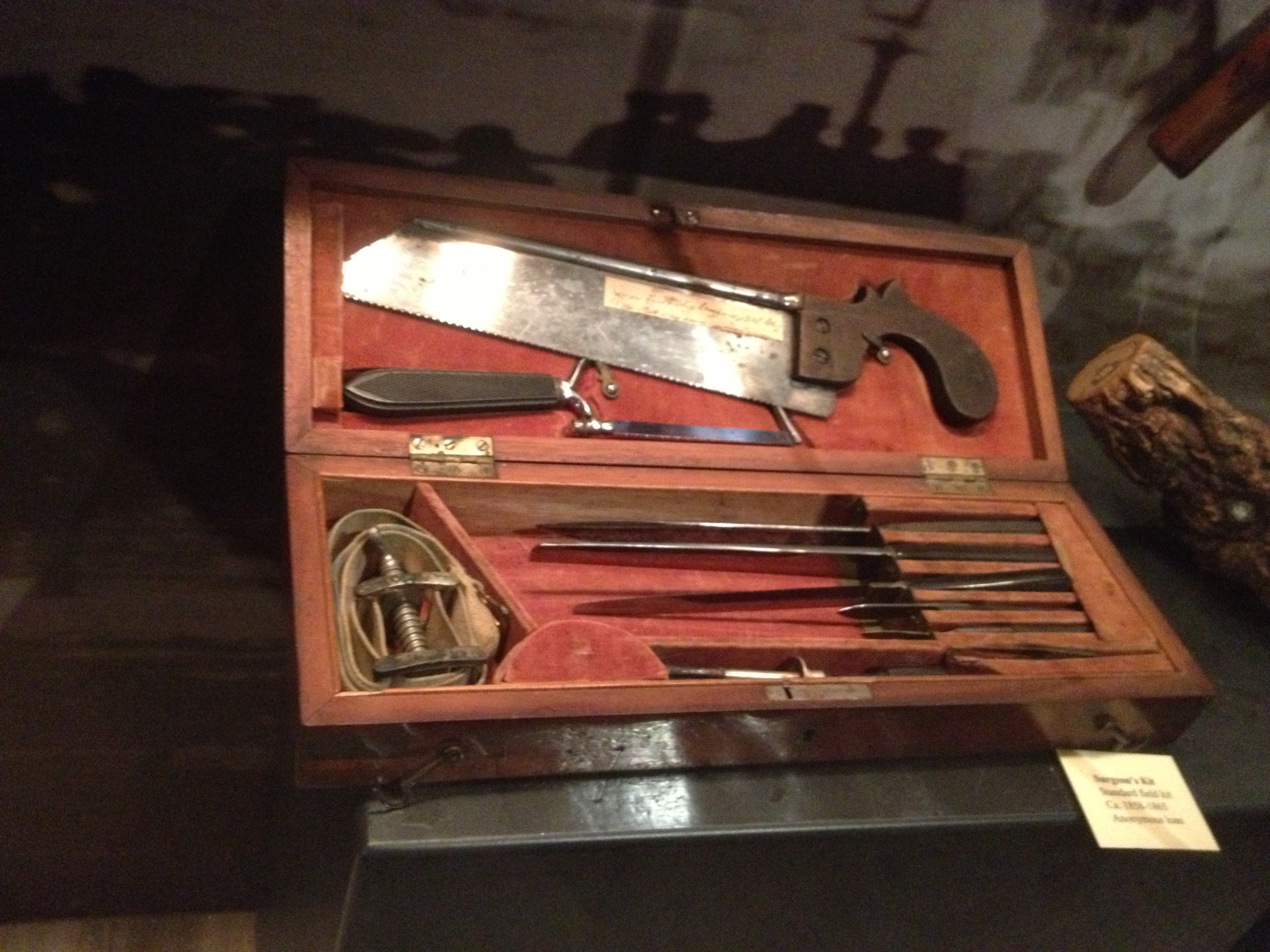
Recreation of a Civil War surgeon's kit

Initially, battlefield casualties were transported to a field hospital set up by their regiment's surgeon and assistant surgeons in a nearby tent, house, or stand of trees; the staff included a Hospital Steward, and whatever nurses, cooks, and laundresses were available. This proved insufficient as some regimental hospitals could easily become overwhelmed while others may refuse to treat casualties from a different regiment. After Second Bull Run, Hammond and Letterman were responsible for consolidating field hospitals at the division or sometimes corps level, ensuring there were enough surgeons and staff to see to the patients' administrative and medical needs. The Confederates would also consolidate field hospitals at the brigade or division after the early part of the war.

If a soldier required further care or convalescence after being treated by the regimental surgeon or at a field hospital, and they could travel, they would be sent to a general hospital well behind the lines. There had been few hospitals in the United States prior to the war as most people preferred to be treated at home, but with the scale of the conflict many were established in towns and cities North and South. In addition to general hospitals which treated all patients and ailments, many specialty hospitals were also set up, such as ones reserved for officers or which treated specific diseases (i.e. "pest" hospitals dedicated to smallpox). Receiving and distributing hospitals, also called depot or clearing hospitals, served as triage centers which provided short-term care before patients were assigned to another hospital. Wayside hospitals were established along common transportation routes to provide a rest area with food and minor medical care for soldiers in transit. The movement of patients and convalescents between these locations was handled by dedicated hospital trains and hospital ships where possible.

== See also ==
- List of American Civil War battles
- Union Army
- Confederate States Army
- Cavalry in the American Civil War
- Cavalry Corps, Army of Northern Virginia
- Cavalry Corps (Union Army)
- Field artillery in the American Civil War
- Siege artillery in the American Civil War
- Bibliography of the American Civil War
- Bibliography of Abraham Lincoln
- Bibliography of Ulysses S. Grant
- Signal Corps
- Balloon Corps
