= General Parsons =

General Parsons may refer to:

- Arthur Parsons (1884–1966), British Indian Army major general
- Charles Parsons (British Army officer) (1855–1923), British Army acting major general
- Harold Parsons (1863–1925), British Army major general
- James K. Parsons (1877–1960), U.S. Army major general
- Lawrence Parsons (British Army officer) (1850–1923), British Army lieutenant general
- Lewis B. Parsons Jr. (1818–1907), Union Army brigadier general of volunteers
- Mosby Monroe Parsons (1822–1865), Confederate States Army brigadier general
- Samuel Holden Parsons (1737–1789), Continental Army major general

== See also ==
- Attorney General Parsons (disambiguation)
