= Attorney General Parsons =

Attorney General Parsons may refer to:

- Angas Parsons (1872–1945), Attorney-General of South Australia
- James A. Parsons (1860s–1945), Attorney General of New York
- Theodore D. Parsons (1894–1978), Attorney General of New Jersey

== See also ==
- General Parsons (disambiguation)
