= Field hygiene and sanitation =

Aspect of military medicine

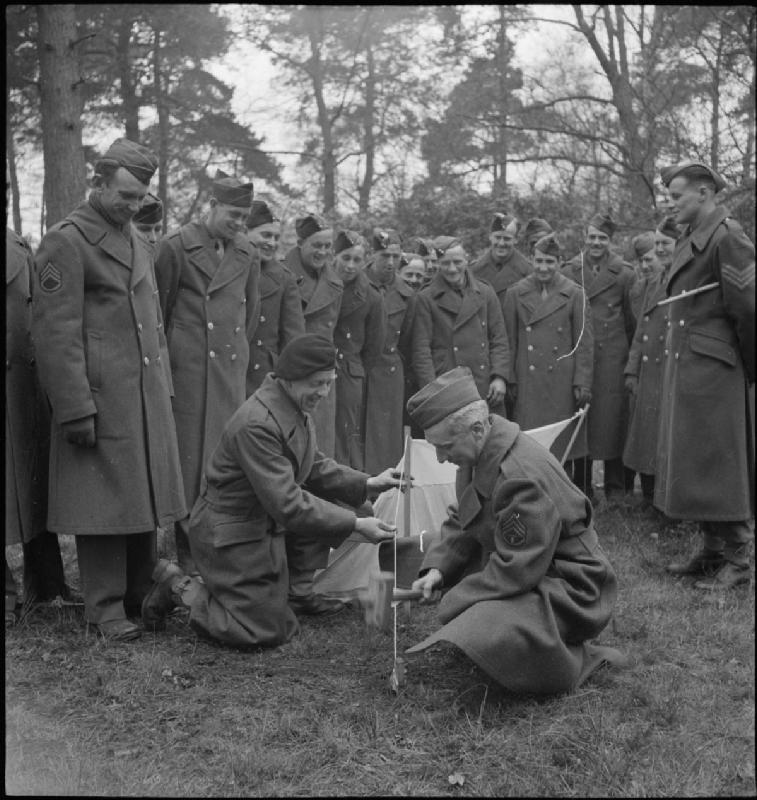
American soldiers train at the British Army School of Hygiene, UK, 1944

Field hygiene and sanitation are two facets of military medicine that seek to ensure reduction of casualties through avoidance of non-combat related health issues among military personnel, particularly in the prevention of disease. As such, it encompasses prevention of communicable diseases; promotes personal hygiene; ensures adequate field water supply; supervises food sanitation; administers waste disposal; and controls, prevents, and combats insect-borne diseases transmitted by mosquitoes, louses, flies, fleas, ticks, mites, and other insects. Field hygiene also includes knowledge, avoidance, and control of venomous animals and rodents, as well as mitigation of health problems related to extreme temperature environments.

Lack of field hygiene and sanitation were major contributors to non-combat casualties and deaths in pre-modern field armies, and these remained serious threats to soldier health in modern warfare during the First World War, on the Eastern Front during the Second World War, in the Korean War, the Vietnam War, and the Soviet–Afghan War. Inadequate field hygiene and sanitation are also major medical problems and causes of death among refugee populations around the world.
