= Beardslee Telegraph =

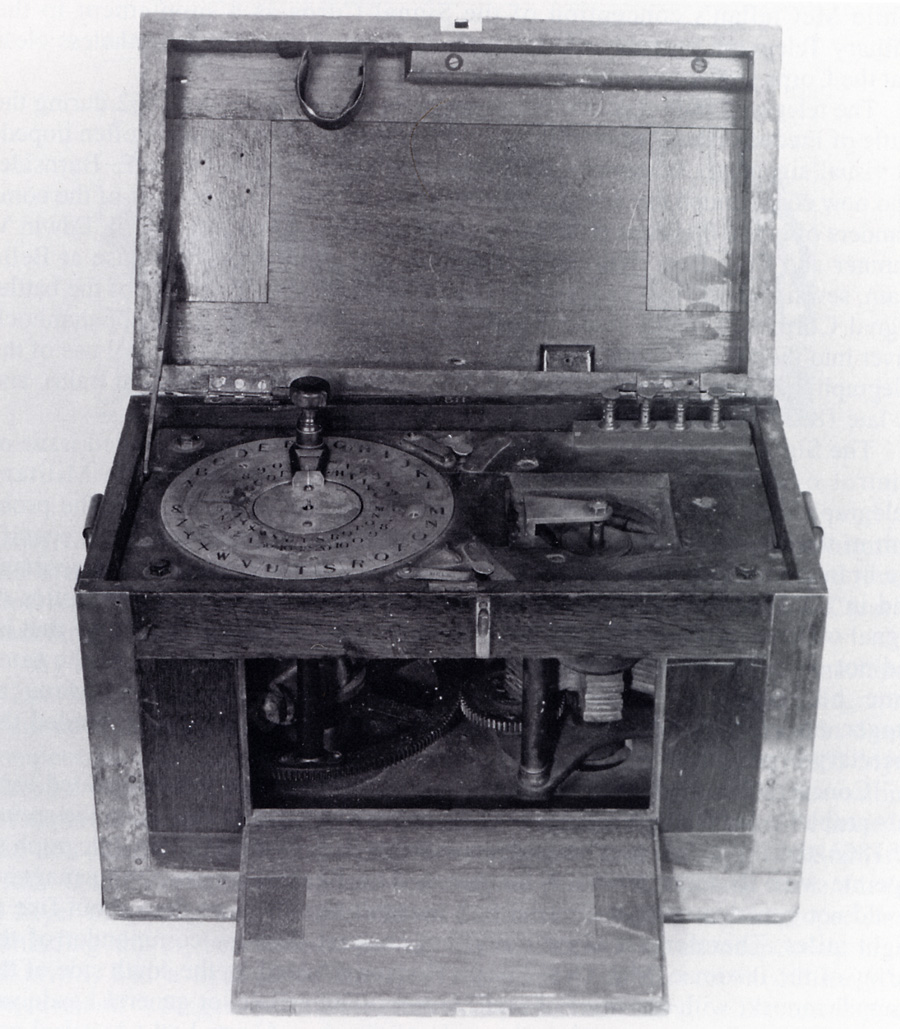
A Beardslee telegraph machine. Note the alphabet dial and pointer instead of the usual transmission key.

The Beardslee Telegraph was a portable military telegraph developed by George Beardslee and adopted by Albert J. Myer to provide a mobile field telegraph system. The instrument was operated by hand-turned magnetos and did not require the heavy batteries needed in the civilian telegraphs. It included an alphabet dial and pointer instead of the usual key for transmission.

Limitations of the instrument were its short range of about ten miles due to insufficient power, slow transmission, and frequent lack of synchronization between sending and receiving sets. It was first used 24 May 1862 in the Peninsular campaign. Its first major triumph was during the Battle of Fredericksburg when it provided Burnside with communications across the river when fog and smoke had rendered the usual visual signal communication impossible.

Its popularity declined after this battle because it was often competing with the faster and more powerful commercial telegraph facilities. In November 1863, most of the equipment was discarded. Only the insulated field wire remained in military use.

== Operation ==
The Beardslee telegraph operated using a magneto. The magnetos generated power to send electricity over the telegraph wire. The operator needed only to move the lever to a point on the dial representing the letter that he wished to send as part of his message. On the receiving end, the dial would move to the corresponding position on the dial.

== Results ==
There were advantages to attaching to this instrument, that it was portable and compact, could be set a work anywhere, required no batteries, acids, or fluids; and, what was thought of importance in the early days of the late war, and while the corps was a temporary organization, it could be worked by soldiers without skill as operators. The defects were, that messages could not be sent as rapidly or as far as by some other instruments. Nor could several instruments work easily upon a single circuit. For some uses on the field of battle, or under fire, where the attention of the reader is disturbed, it is, perhaps, as good an instrument as has been devised. With a permanent corps, or at secure stations it gives place to some of the forms of signal or of sound instruments.

— Albert J. Myer

=== Slow rate of transmission ===
The Beardslee was considered to be capable of only a slow rate of transmission. The dial consisted of thirty positions around the circumference. In the worst case of a double letter, all thirty positions must be traversed to send the second iteration. The advancing mechanism is an escapement very similar as would be found in a pendulum driven clock. Each advance would require two movements of the escapement. Each movement would advance the dial six degrees with twelve degrees per step being 360/30. Therefore 60 movements would be required. Because of these factors, nothing over 5 words per minute would have been achieved.
