= Lewis B. Parsons Jr. =

American Civil War general

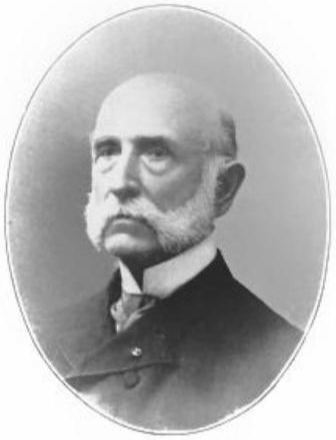
- Born: April 5, 1818; Perry, New York, US
- Died: March 16, 1907 (aged 88); Flora, Illinois, US
- Resting place: Bellefontaine Cemetery
- Education: Yale College; Harvard Law School
- Occupation(s): Banker, lawyer, military officer

Lewis Baldwin Parsons Jr. (April 5, 1818 – March 16, 1907) was one of the last officers who was promoted to brigadier general of volunteers in the Union Army during the American Civil War.

== Early life and career ==
Lewis B. Parsons Jr. was born at Perry, New York, on April 5, 1818. Parsons College was named after his father Lewis B. Parsons Sr. His grandfather, Charles Parsons, had been an officer in the American Revolutionary War. In early life, Lewis B. Parsons Jr. graduated from Yale College in 1840, was a teacher, and graduated from Harvard Law School in 1844. He practiced law in Alton, Illinois. In 1854, he moved to St. Louis, Missouri, where he became president of the Ohio and Mississippi Railway.

== Civil war ==
Parsons began his service as a captain and assistant quartermaster on October 31, 1861. He was an aide-de-camp to then Missouri Militia Brigadier General Francis Preston Blair Jr. in 1861. He was in charge of rail and river transport in the Department of the Missouri from December 1861 to March 11, 1862. He was appointed colonel in the Regular Army and aide-de-camp to Major General Henry Halleck February 19, 1862. He was in charge of rail and river transport in the Department of Mississippi, March 11, 1862, to September 11, 1862. Parsons was appointed aide-de-camp to Major General Samuel Ryan Curtis September 19, 1862, and in charge of rail and river transport in the Army of the Tennessee from September 1862 to December 1863. Parsons then was appointed aide-de-camp to Major General John M. Schofield July 10. 1863. He was in charge of rail and river transport in the Military Division of the Mississippi from December 1863 to August 2, 1864. Parsons was appointed Colonel, Quartermaster, August 2, 1864, to May 12, 1865. Parsons was in charge of river and rail transport in the Department of the Ohio from January 12, 1865, to April 30, 1866.

On May 11, 1865, President of the United States Andrew Johnson appointed Parsons brigadier general of volunteers, to rank from May 11, 1865, but Johnson did not submit a nomination for confirmation of the appointment to the United States Senate until January 13, 1866. The U.S. Senate confirmed the appointment on February 23, 1866. Parsons was mustered out of the volunteers on April 30, 1866.

== Death and interment ==
After the war, Parsons lived in Flora, Illinois, where he was a banker. Lewis B. Parsons Jr. died on March 16, 1907, at Flora, Illinois. He was buried at Bellefontaine Cemetery, St. Louis, Missouri.

== Legacy ==
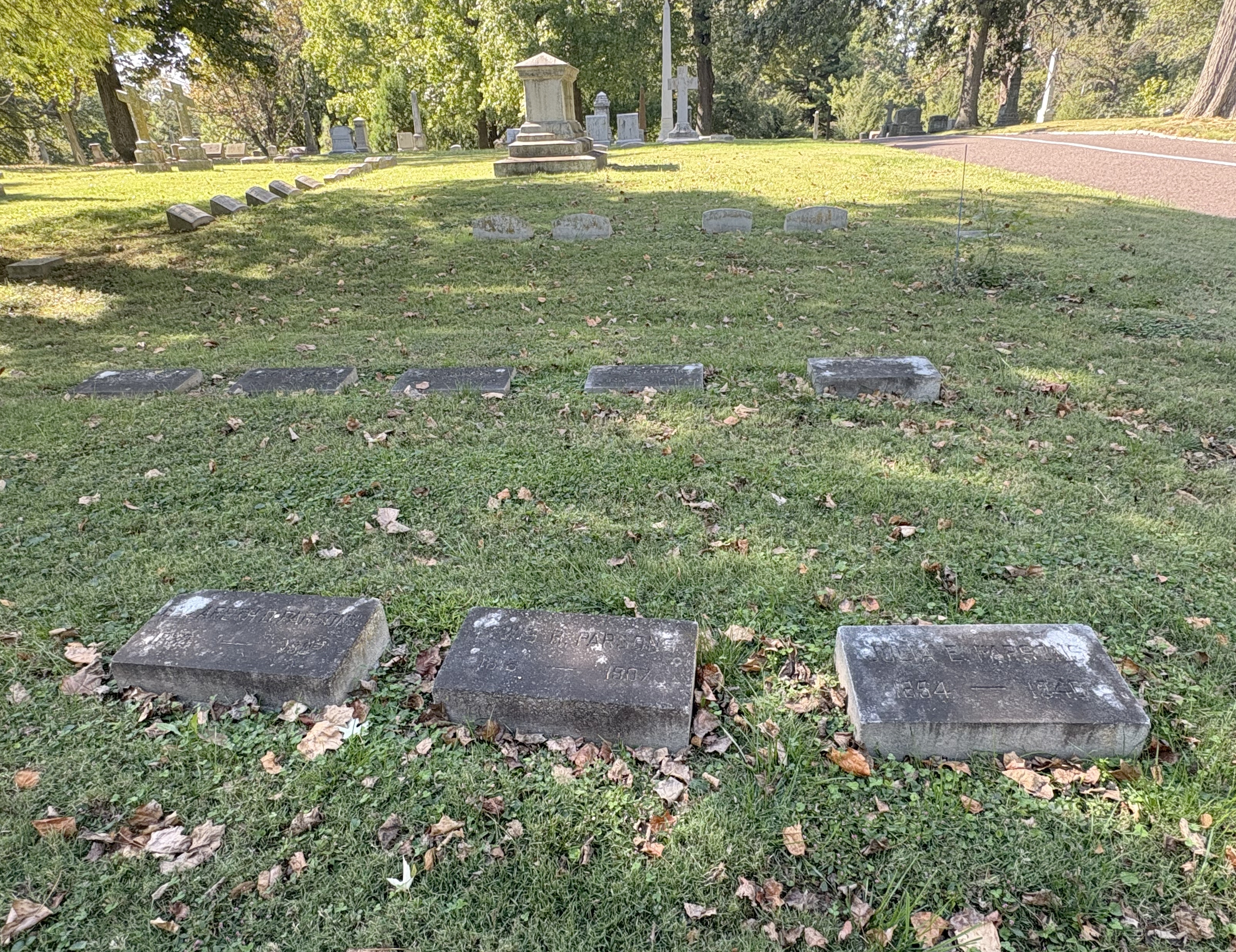
Parsons' grave (front, center) at Bellefontaine Cemetery

Parsons work as an officer in the Army quartermaster corps

... laid the foundation for the expansion of military railroad activities in the West. After helping to furnish transports for the use of Grant in his expedition against Fort Donelson and Fort Henry in February 1862, Parsons was promoted to Colonel in April and was made an aide on General Halleck's staff. His work from late 1862 until after the end of the war was little short of Herculean. ... The importance of Parsons lay in the fact that he created an orderly basis for the work of the United States Military Railroads in the West in 1864 and 1865.

== See also ==
- List of American Civil War generals (Union)
