= Aerial telegraphy =

Aerial telegraphy may refer to:

- Wigwag (flag signals), signalling by hand with a single flag
- Optical telegraphy, chains of fixed telegraph stations using shutters or semaphore arms
- Wireless telegraphy in general, or from an aircraft in particular
