= Signal Corps in the American Civil War =

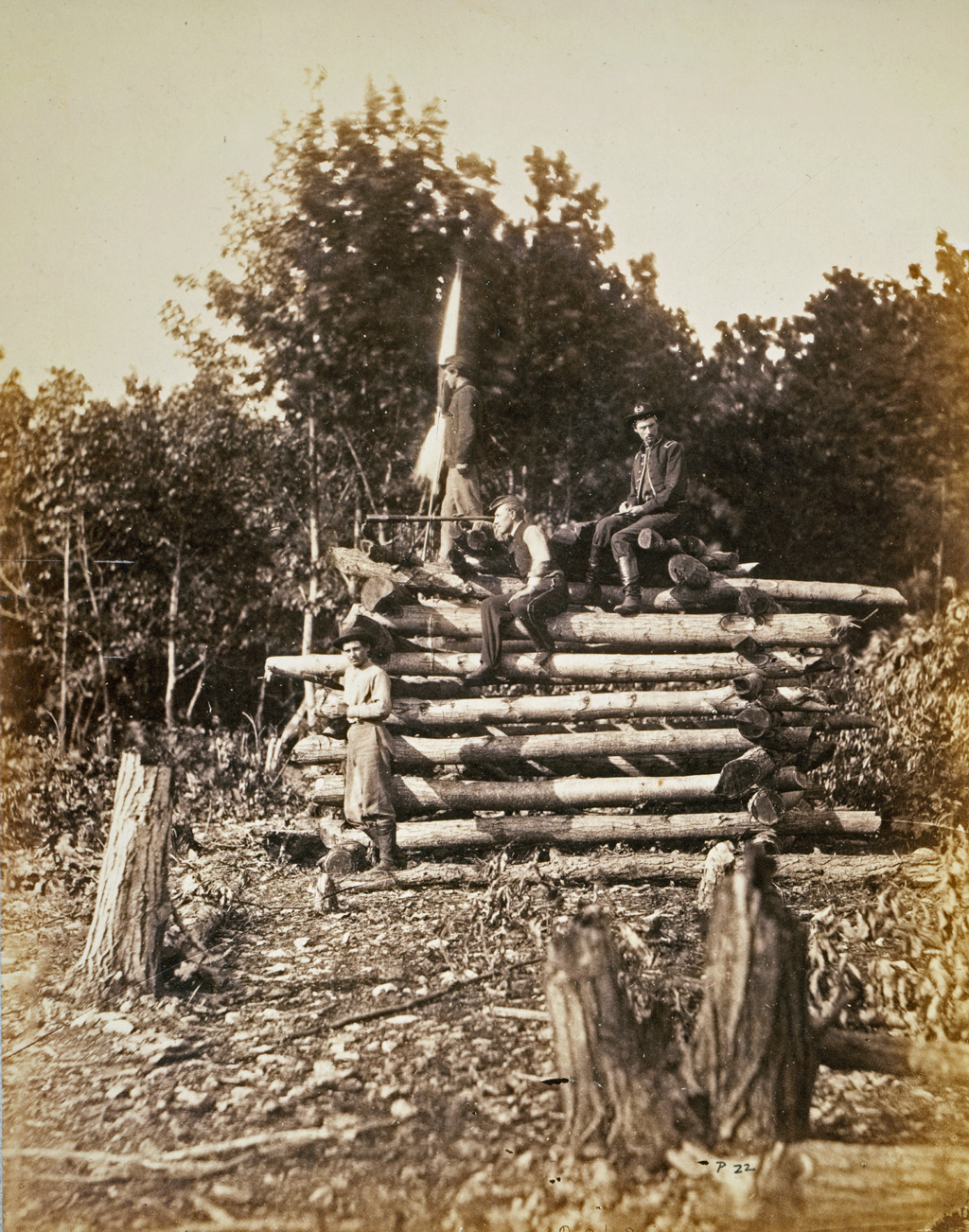
U.S. Army Signal Corps station on Elk Mountain, Maryland, overlooking the Antietam battlefield.

The Signal Corps in the American Civil War comprised two organizations: the U.S. Army Signal Corps, which began with the appointment of Major Albert J. Myer as its first signal officer just before the war and remains an entity to this day, and the Confederate States Army Signal Corps, a much smaller group of officers and men, using similar organizations and techniques as their Union opponents. Both accomplished tactical and strategic communications for the warring armies, including electromagnetic telegraphy and aerial telegraphy ("wig-wag" signaling). Although both services had an implicit mission of battlefield observation, intelligence gathering, and artillery fire direction from their elevated signal stations, the Confederate Signal Corps also included an explicit espionage function.

The Union Signal Corps, although effective on the battlefield, suffered from political disputes in Washington, D.C., particularly in its rivalry with the civilian-led U.S. Military Telegraph Corps. Myer was relieved of his duties as chief signal officer by Secretary of War Edwin M. Stanton for his attempts to control all electromagnetic telegraphy within the Signal Corps. He was not restored to his role as chief signal officer until after the war.

== U.S. Army (Union) Signal Corps ==
=== First chief signal officer ===
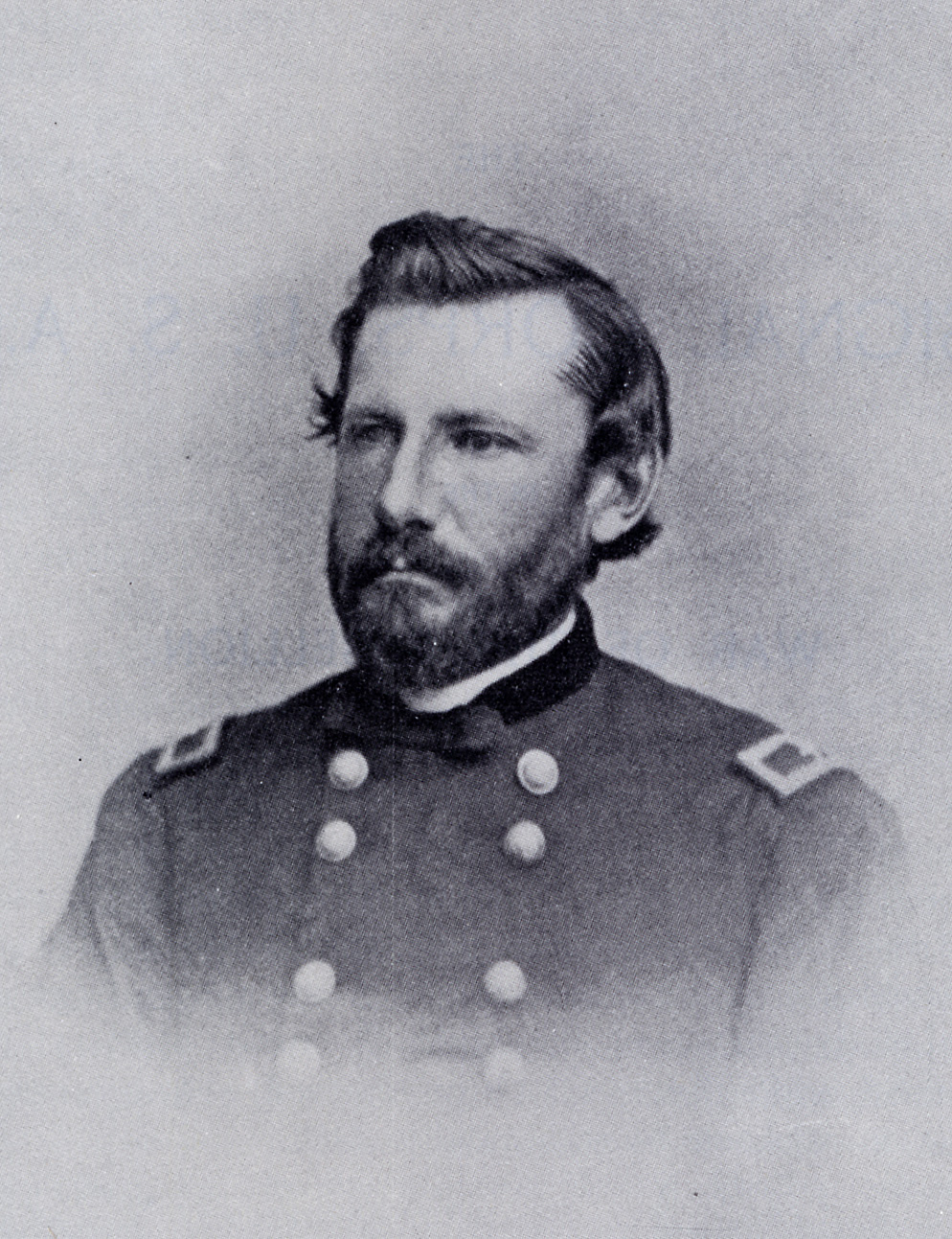
Albert J. Myer, first chief signal officer.

The "father" of the U.S. Army Signal Corps was Major Albert J. Myer, an Army surgeon with an interest in communications by sign language for the deaf and then in signaling over long distances with lightweight and simple to use equipment. He invented a signaling system using a flag (or a kerosene torch for nighttime use) that is known as wig-wag signaling, or aerial telegraphy. Unlike semaphore flag signaling, which employed two flags, signal wig-wag required only one, using a binary code to represent each letter of the alphabet or digit. Myer was serving at Fort Duncan, Texas, in 1856 when he wrote to Secretary of War Jefferson Davis and offered his signaling system to the War Department. Although the chief engineer of the Army, Colonel Joseph G. Totten, supported Myer's proposal, it did not include specific technical details and Davis rejected it. When John B. Floyd replaced Davis as secretary of war in 1857, Totten reintroduced Myer's proposal, and in March 1859, a board of examination was formed in Washington, D.C. The board, presided over by Lt. Col. Robert E. Lee, was not enthusiastic about the proposal, judging it suitable only as a secondary means of communications over short distances, but it did recommend further testing.

Myer began testing in April 1859 at Fort Monroe, Virginia, and then New York Harbor, West Point, New York, and Washington, D.C. One of Myer's principal assistants was Second Lieutenant Edward Porter Alexander, the future Confederate signal, engineer, and artillery officer. They were able to communicate at distances up to 15 miles and Myer reported to the War Department that the tests had "exceeded anticipation." He recommended that the Army adopt his signaling system and that he should be placed in charge of it.

On March 29, 1860, the United States House of Representatives approved the Army appropriations bill for fiscal year 1861, which included the following amendment:

For the manufacture or purchase of apparatus and equipment for field signals, $2000; and that there be added to the staff of the Army one signal officer, with the rank, pay, and allowance of a major of cavalry, who shall have charge, under the direction of the Secretary of War, of all signal duty, and all books, papers, and apparatus connected therewith.

The United States Senate eventually approved the appropriations bill, over the objections of Jefferson Davis, now Senator from Mississippi, and President James Buchanan signed it into law on June 21, 1860, the date now celebrated as the birthday of the modern U.S. Army Signal Corps. Myer's appointment as the first signal officer with the rank of major was confirmed by the Senate on June 27. However, the appropriations bill provided for no personnel to work for Myer and the Signal Corps as a formal organization would not be authorized until March 1863.

Immediately before the war, Myer was assigned to the Department of New Mexico to test his signals in the field during a campaign against the Navajos. In that assignment, he was assisted by Second Lieutenant William J. L. Nicodemus, who would later succeed him as chief signal officer. Field testing proceeded successfully, and won the admiration of Major Edward Canby, who became a strong advocate of forming a dedicated Signal Corps; Myer at this time believed that the best approach for staffing signal work would be to train officers across the Army in its disciplines.

=== War organization ===
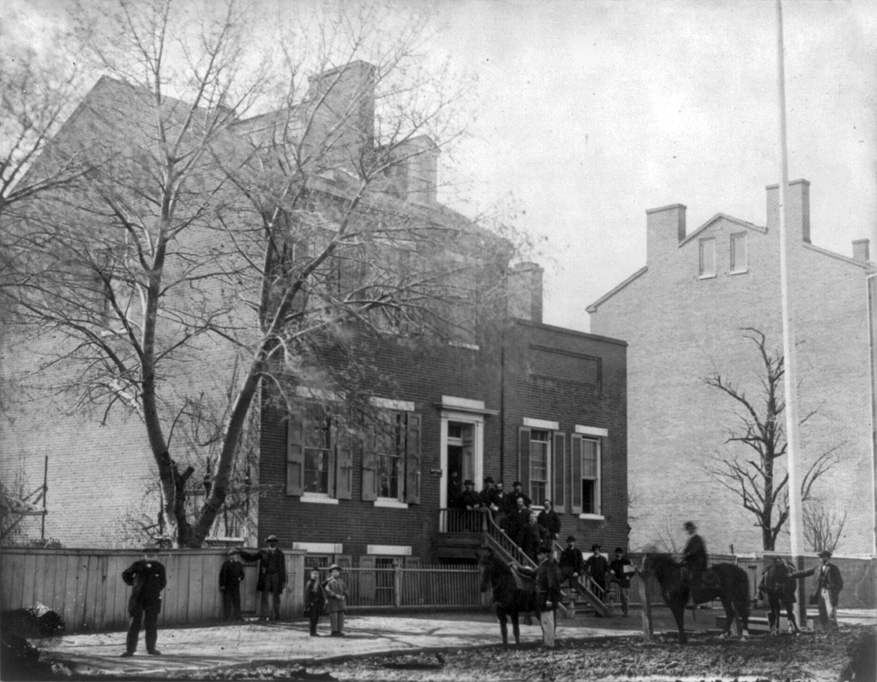
Headquarters of the U.S. Army Signal Corps, Washington, D.C., 1865.

Upon the outbreak of war, Myer returned to Washington and addressed the problem of having no signal personnel. His only option was to persuade officers to be detailed from other assignments, which was not considered satisfactory by Myer or the officers themselves, who feared loss of promotion opportunities. He submitted draft legislation to Secretary of War Simon Cameron in August 1861, proposing that a Signal Corps be established with himself, seven assistant signal officers, 40 warrant officers, and 40 signal artificers to serve as line builders and repairmen. He intended that each division of the Army, which he assumed would eventually comprise 500,000 men, would have dedicated aerial and electromagnetic telegraphy support. Congress adjourned without considering the legislation. That fall, Myer, who in addition to being chief signal officer for the Army, served as chief signal officer of the newly formed Army of the Potomac, set up training facilities for detailed officers and men in Fort Monroe and at Red Hill, Georgetown, Washington, D.C. His latter training camp remained in operation through the Peninsula Campaign and the rest of 1862, a period in which he continued to lobby with Congress and the Secretary of War, now Edwin M. Stanton, to establish a permanent corps.

Myer's persistence paid off when President Abraham Lincoln signed a sundry civil appropriations bill on March 3, 1863, which authorized the organization of a Signal Corps during the "present rebellion." It included the position of chief signal officer with the rank of colonel, a lieutenant colonel, two majors, a captain for each corps or military department, and as many lieutenants, not to exceed eight, per corps or department as the president deemed necessary. Each officer was provided one sergeant and six privates. Myer was appointed to the position of chief signal officer and the rank of colonel by Secretary Stanton on April 29, but his appointment could not be immediately confirmed by the Senate, which was in recess.

Although Myer interpreted his appointment to include control over electromagnetic telegraphy, a rival organization emerged. The U.S. Military Telegraph Corps employed civilian telegraph operators, with supervisors who received military commissions in the Quartermaster Department, under the general management of Anson Stager, a former official of the Western Union Telegraph Company. In February 1862, Lincoln took control of the nation's commercial telegraph lines, which were then used by Stager's organization. Secretary Stanton, a former director and attorney for the Atlantic and Ohio Telegraph Company, understood the technical and strategic importance of telegraphy and located the telegraph office directly next to his own in the War Department. One of his biographers described the operators as Stanton's "little army ... part of his own personal and confidential staff." Myer began a campaign to supersede this organization by proposing the purchase of equipment to form telegraph trains (in the sense of wagon trains, not railroad) in the Signal Corps, to provide mobility for telegraph operators supporting armies on the move. Since he was concerned about the training required for telegraph operators using traditional Morse key equipment, he outfitted his trains with a magneto-electric telegraph instrument invented by George W. Beardslee of New York City. When this device suffered from technical limitations, in the autumn of 1862 he advertised in the Army and Navy Official Gazette for trained telegraphers. The War Department informed Myer that his actions were "irregular and improper" and he was removed as chief signal officer on November 10, 1863. All of the Beardslee devices were given to the Military Telegraph Service (which never used them, due to unreliability) and Myer was transferred to Memphis, Tennessee. His replacement as acting chief signal officer was Major William J. L. Nicodemus, his former apprentice. During his exile in the West, Myer's A Manual of Signals: For the Use of Signal Officers in the Field was published in 1864, a work that would remain the basis of signal doctrine for many years.

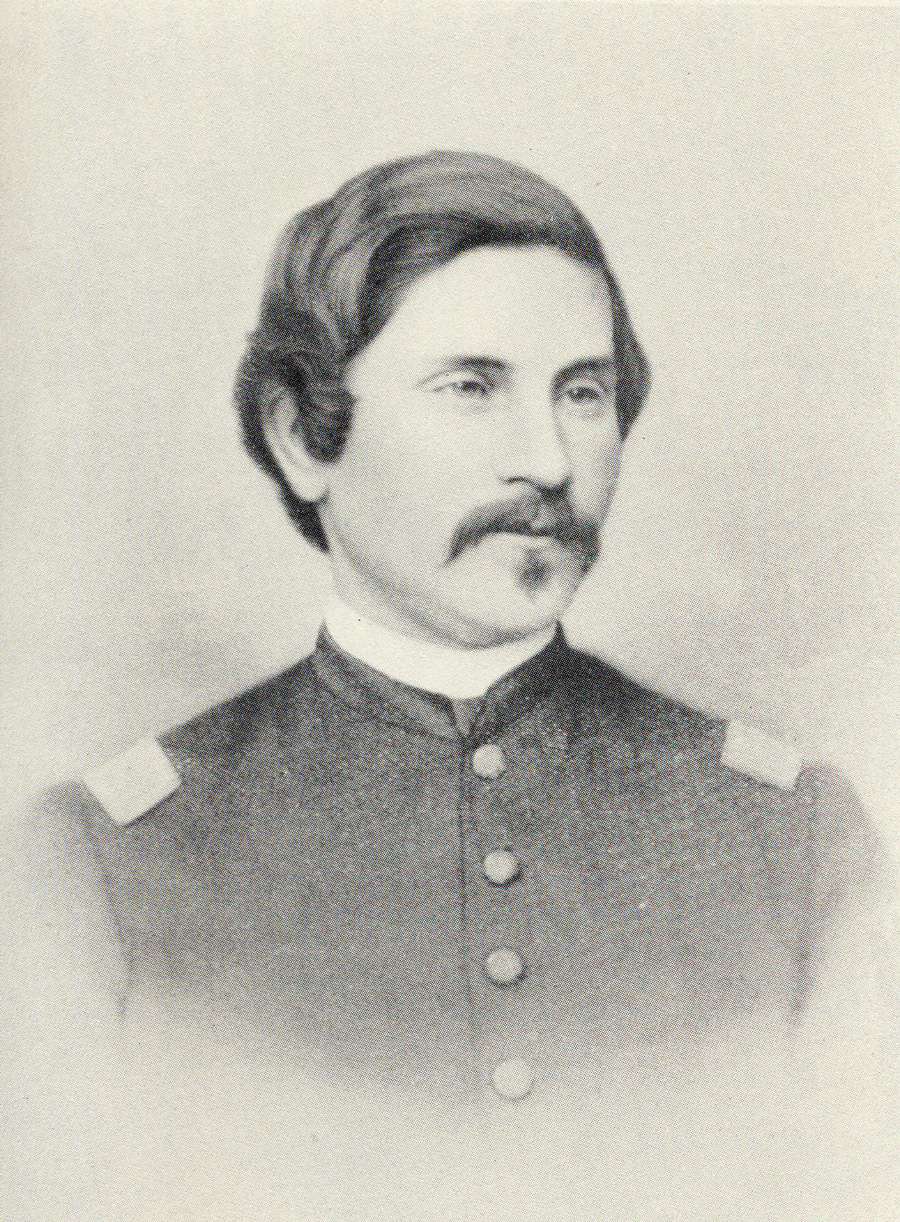
William J. L. Nicodemus.

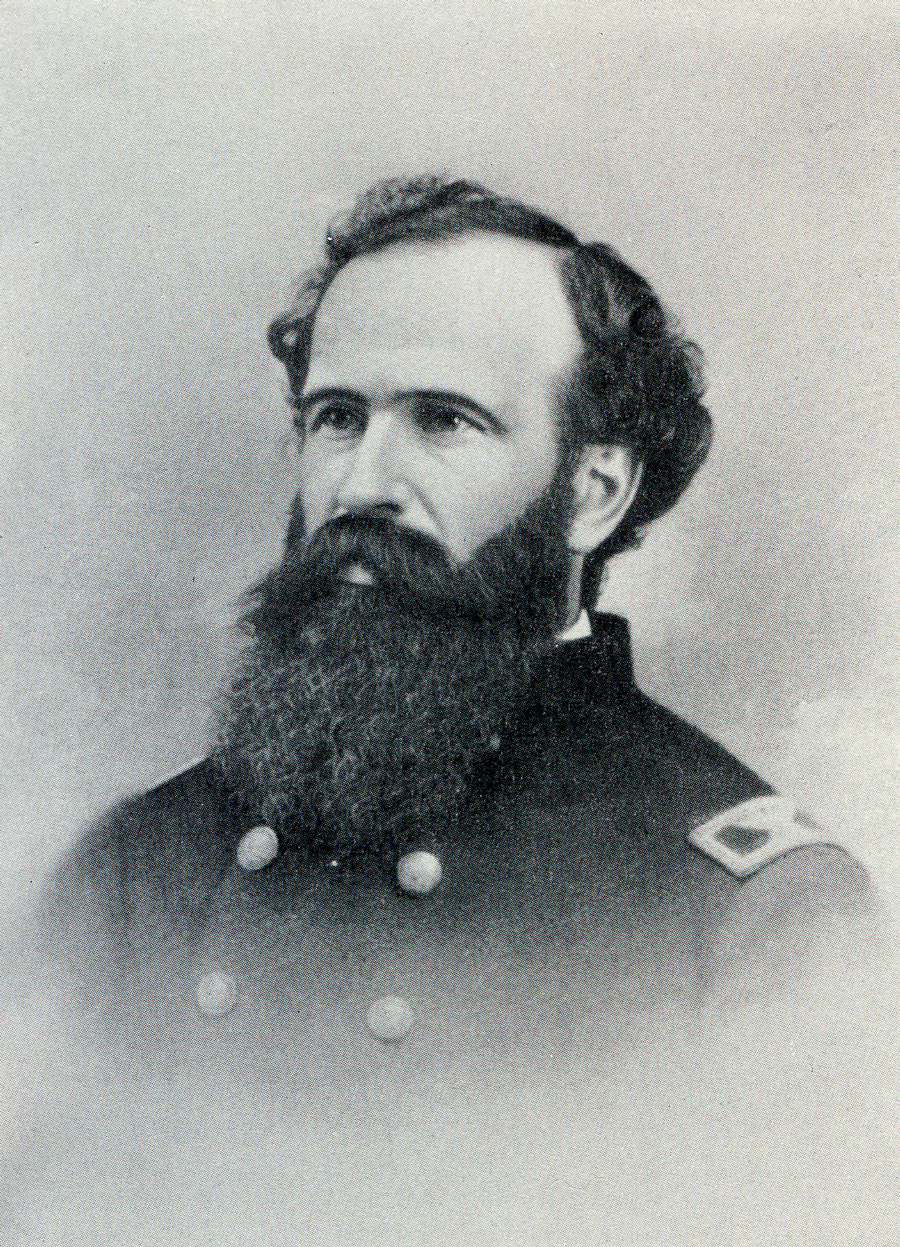
Benjamin F. Fisher.

Nicodemus inherited an organization that had grown to approximately 200 officers and 1000 enlisted men. He also ran afoul of Secretary Stanton when the 1864 annual report for the Signal Corps was published because it revealed that the corps was able to read the enemy's signals. Stanton rightfully believed this to be a breach of security and he dismissed Nicodemus from the Army in December 1864. The final chief signal officer during the war was Colonel Benjamin F. Fisher, former chief signal officer of the Army of the Potomac, who had been captured near Aldie, Virginia, in the Gettysburg campaign and spent eight months in Libby Prison before escaping and returning to duty.

The Signal Corps completed its wartime service and was dissolved in August 1865. During its lifetime, 146 officers were commissioned in the corps or were offered commissions. There were 297 acting signal officers appointed, although some were for very brief periods. The total number of enlisted men who served during the war was about 2,500.

Albert Myer was eventually rescued from oblivion. In May 1864, Myer's prewar ally, Edward Canby, selected him to be the signal officer for the Military Division of West Mississippi. Myer served in this position as a major because his confirmation as a colonel had been revoked after his dismissal from Washington. At the end of the Civil War, he was given a brevet promotion to brigadier general. On July 28, 1866, reacting to the influence of Lt. Gen. Ulysses S. Grant and President Andrew Johnson, Congress reorganized the Signal Corps and, with the permanent rank of colonel, Myer again became chief signal officer, as of October 30, 1866. His new duties included control of the telegraph service, resolving the dispute that had removed him from his position.

== Confederate Signal Corps ==
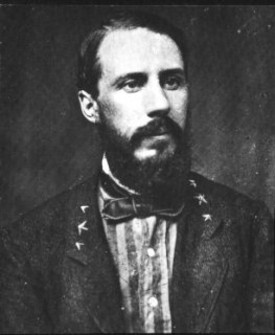
Edward Porter Alexander

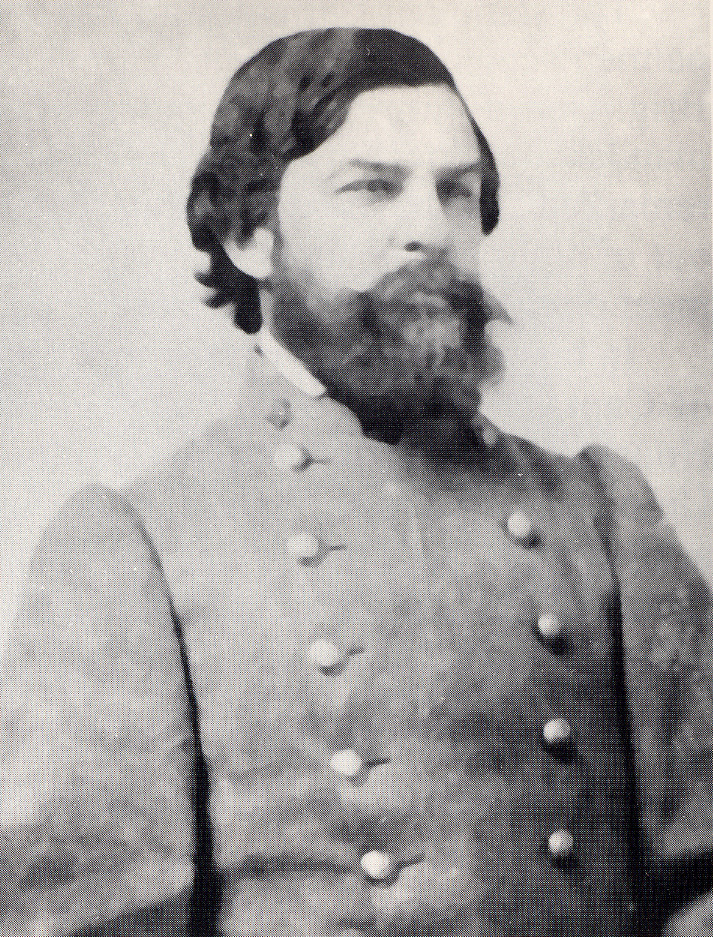
William Norris

Edward P. Alexander, Myer's assistant in testing the wig-wag signaling system, resigned his U.S. Army commission on May 1, 1861, to join the Confederate Army as a captain of engineers. While organizing and training new recruits to form a Confederate signal service, he was ordered to report to Brig. Gen. P.G.T. Beauregard at Manassas Junction, Virginia. He became the chief engineer and signal officer of the (Confederate) Army of the Potomac on June 3. After becoming the chief ordnance officer for the Army of Northern Virginia, Alexander retained his position as signal officer, but his other duties took precedence.

Although the Confederate Signal Corps would never achieve a distinct branch identity to the extent that the Union version did, the Confederate Congress authorized its establishment as a separate organization, attached to the Adjutant and Inspector General's Department, on April 19, 1862, a year before the U.S. Congress did so. The first chief signal officer was Captain William Norris, a Maryland lawyer then a civilian volunteer on the staff of Maj. Gen. John B. Magruder. The corps under Norris was organized to consist of one major, 10 captains, 20 lieutenants, 20 sergeants, and 1500 men detailed from all branches of the service. A signal officer was authorized for the staff at each corps and division. The Confederate Signal Corps perform duties and utilized equipment very similar to their Northern counterparts, with some exceptions. Electric telegraphy was not used in tactical battlefield communications due to shortages of telegraph wire and trained operators. Their aerial telegraphy was performed with similar flags, but with slightly modified codes and movements from the Myer methods. Unlike the Union Signal Corps, however, the Confederate Signal Corps also was chartered to conduct espionage for the South. (Both services provided valuable battlefield intelligence, and sometimes artillery fire direction, from their elevated observation points, but the Confederate corpsmen performed undercover missions behind enemy lines as well.) Acting as the Secret Service of the Confederacy, the corps administered the Secret Line, an information network that ran between Richmond and the North and extended into Canada. It is because of its clandestine nature that much of the work of the Confederate Signal Corps is lost to history. Many of its records were burned in the fall of Richmond and in a subsequent fire at Norris's home, which claimed his personal papers.

== Signal equipment and techniques ==
=== Wig-wag signaling ===
Wig-wag signaling was performed during daylight with a single flag tied to a hickory staff constructed in four-foot jointed sections. Flags were generally made of cotton, linen, or another lightweight fabric and were issued in the following sizes:

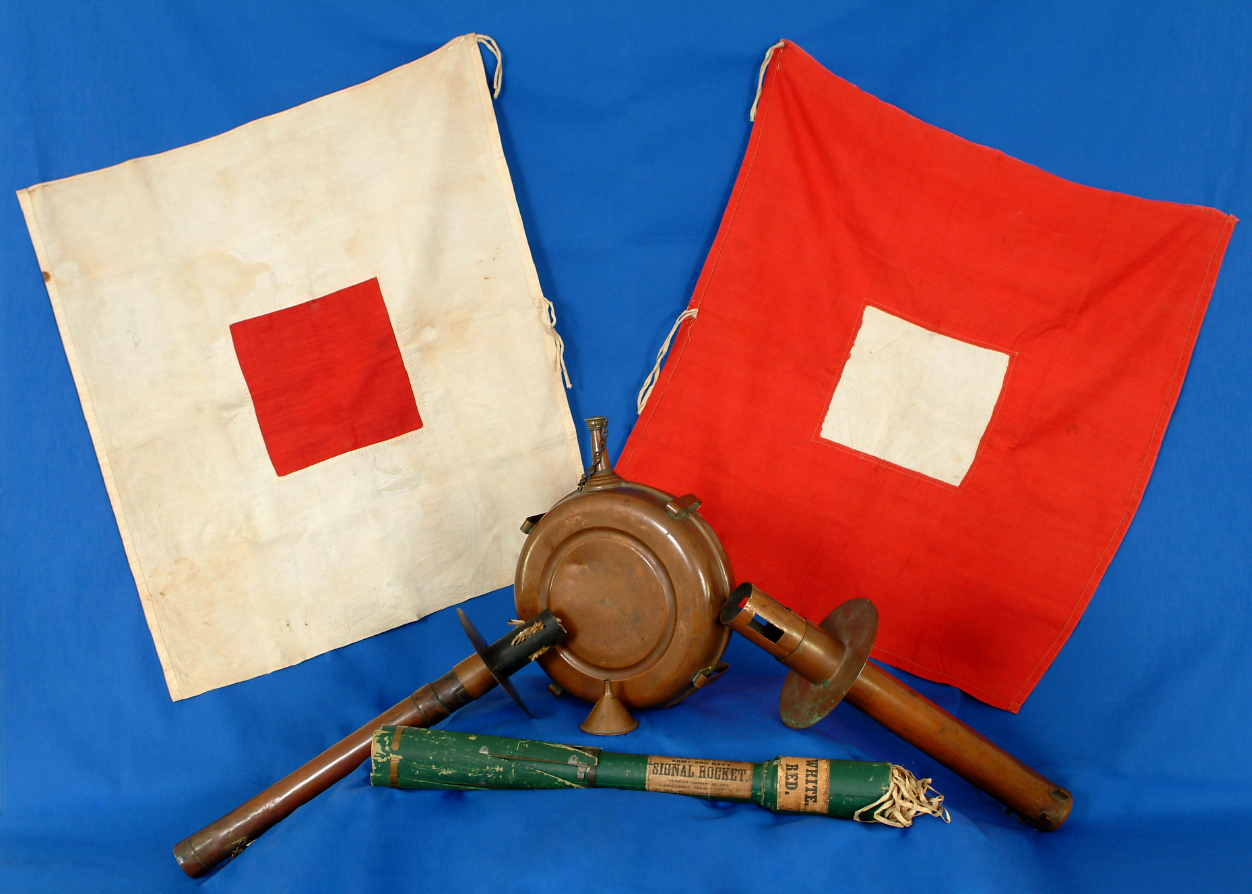
Standard Issue Civil War Signal Corps Kit, complete with flags and torches.

Flag size (feet)	Flag background color	Center color	Center size (inches)
6 x 6	white	red	24 x 24
6 x 6	black	white	24 x 24
4 x 4	white	red	16 x 16
4 x 4	black	white	16 x 16
4 x 4	red	white	16 x 16
2 x 2	white	red	8 x 8
2 x 2	red	white	8 x 8

The 4-foot flags with white backgrounds, mounted on 12 foot staffs, were most often used, although 2-foot flags were used when the flagman wanted to avoid enemy attention. Red flags were generally used at sea. For nighttime signaling, torches were copper cylinders, 18 inches long and 1.5 inches in diameter with a cotton wick.

Myer's "General Service Code" for wig-wag signaling, standardized in 1864, was also known as the "four element" code because all of the characters transmitted were composed of from one to four flag motions. (Myer's original method from the 1850s was called a "two element code" because elements were described only in terms of movement from the vertical position.) The flagman took a position facing the station to receive the message and signaled digits "1" through "5" as follows:

1. Wave the flag from the vertical position to the ground at the left of the flagman, returning immediately to the vertical position.
2. Wave the flag from the vertical position to the ground at the right of the flagman, returning immediately to the vertical position.
3. Wave the flag from the ground on the right to the ground on the left of the flagman, returning immediately to the vertical position. The signal "3" always followed a "2" or "4."
4. Wave the flag from the ground on the left to the ground on the right of the flagman, returning immediately to the vertical position. The signal "4" always followed a "1" or "3."
5. Wave the flag directly in front of the flagman to the ground, returning immediately to the vertical position.

Codes for the alphabet, digits, and some special characters were as follows for the Union Signal Corps:

A - 11	F - 1114	K - 1434	P - 2343	U - 223	Z - 1111	1 - 14223	6 - 23111
B - 1423	G - 1142	L - 114	Q - 2342	V - 2311	& - 2222	2 - 23114	7 - 22311
C - 234	H - 231	M - 2314	R - 142	W - 2234	tion - 2223	3 - 11431	8 - 22223
D - 111	I - 2	N - 22	S - 143	X - 1431	ing - 1143	4 - 11143	9 - 22342
E - 23	J - 2231	O - 14	T - 1	Y - 222	ed - 1422	5 - 11114	0 - 11111

Waving the flag continuously from left to right was used to attract attention and to indicate that signaling was about to start. Other special sequences of digits were:

5	End of word
55	End of sentence
555	End of message
11, 11, 11, 5	"I understand"
11, 11, 11, 555	"Cease signaling"
234, 234, 234, 5	"Repeat"
143434, 5	"Error"

=== Telegraph train and the Beardslee telegraph ===
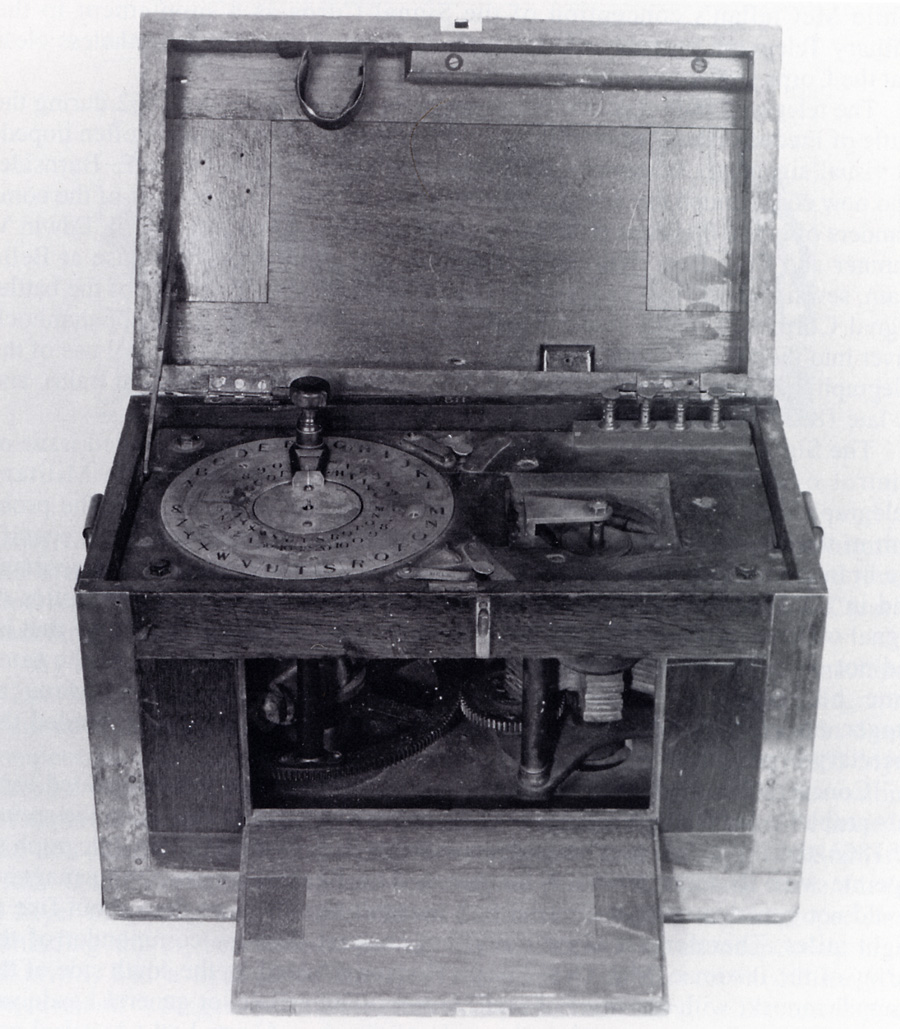
Beardslee telegraph.

Telegraph trains were introduced by Myer to support telegraphy for mobile operations. The horse-drawn wagons carried the telegraph sets and supplies such as reels of insulated copper wire and iron lances, for stringing temporary field lines, a practice called "flying telegraph lines." Each train consisted of two wagons, equipped with 5 miles of wire and a telegraph instrument. The first model train was constructed by Henry J. Rogers, a telegraphic engineer from New York City who had worked with Samuel F.B. Morse in building the first commercial telegraph line between Washington and Baltimore in 1844. Rogers's original telegraph instrument for the train replaced the traditional sending key and sound receiver with a dial indicator, a circular index plate bearing the letters of the alphabet and a pointer that turned to the letter to be transmitted. A similar pointer spelled out the message at the receiving end. Rogers provided a galvanic battery that eliminated the danger of acid spills. This equipment eliminated the need for skilled operators who had to be trained in Morse code. Field trials in February 1862 found that it worked satisfactorily over a test circuit of 2 miles of wire. A board of three signal officers recommended that such a train would be of great use as an auxiliary to permanent telegraph lines.

For its first use in combat, during the 1862 Peninsula Campaign, the Rogers train substituted a new telegraph instrument, the Beardslee Patent Magneto-Electric Field Telegraph Machine, invented by George W. Beardslee of New York. This instrument required no battery, using instead a hand-cranked generator, but it was also based on a dial indicator. The Beardslee telegraph was housed in a wooden chest with handles and weighed about 100 pounds. It had two significant technical deficiencies, however. Its generator could not produce enough electricity to transmit signals more than about 5 to 8 miles. More seriously, there was a tendency for the sending and receiving index pointers to get out of synchronization, hopelessly garbling transmitted messages. Broken machines had to be sent back to New York City for repair. It was these deficiencies that led Myer to his decision to use traditional Morse key technology and attempt to hire trained telegraphers, a decision that led Secretary Stanton to dismiss him as chief signal officer. All of the telegraph train assets of the Signal Corps were turned over to the Military Telegraph Service, but they did not use the Beardslee telegraph due to its unreliability. At their peak of usage in 1863, there were 30 telegraph trains in the field.

=== Ciphers ===
Union Signal Corps cipher disc with two-element General Signal Code inscriptions.

Since aerial telegraphy was sometimes conducted within the clear sight of the enemy, security was a major problem. The Signal Corps introduced a cipher disc, a simple device that allowed the encryption of text. Two concentric discs were inscribed with letters and their numerical equivalents. The sending and receiving party had to agree on the specific alignment between the two discs, ensuring that both parties had identical alignment. To encipher a message, the signal officer selected an "adjustment letter" on the inner disc and then made this letter correspond with a preselected numerical code or "key number" on the outer disc. The signal officer would typically give the key numbers to the flagmen without revealing the plain text version of the message. Although this method of encryption was primitive by modern standards, there is no record that the Confederates ever deciphered a Union message that had been processed in this manner. A more complex system in which four concentric discs were used was invented by Sergeant Francis M. Metcalf and modified by Captain Lemuel B. Norton, but it did not receive widespread adoption.

=== Variants of the flags ===
Back and white signal flag

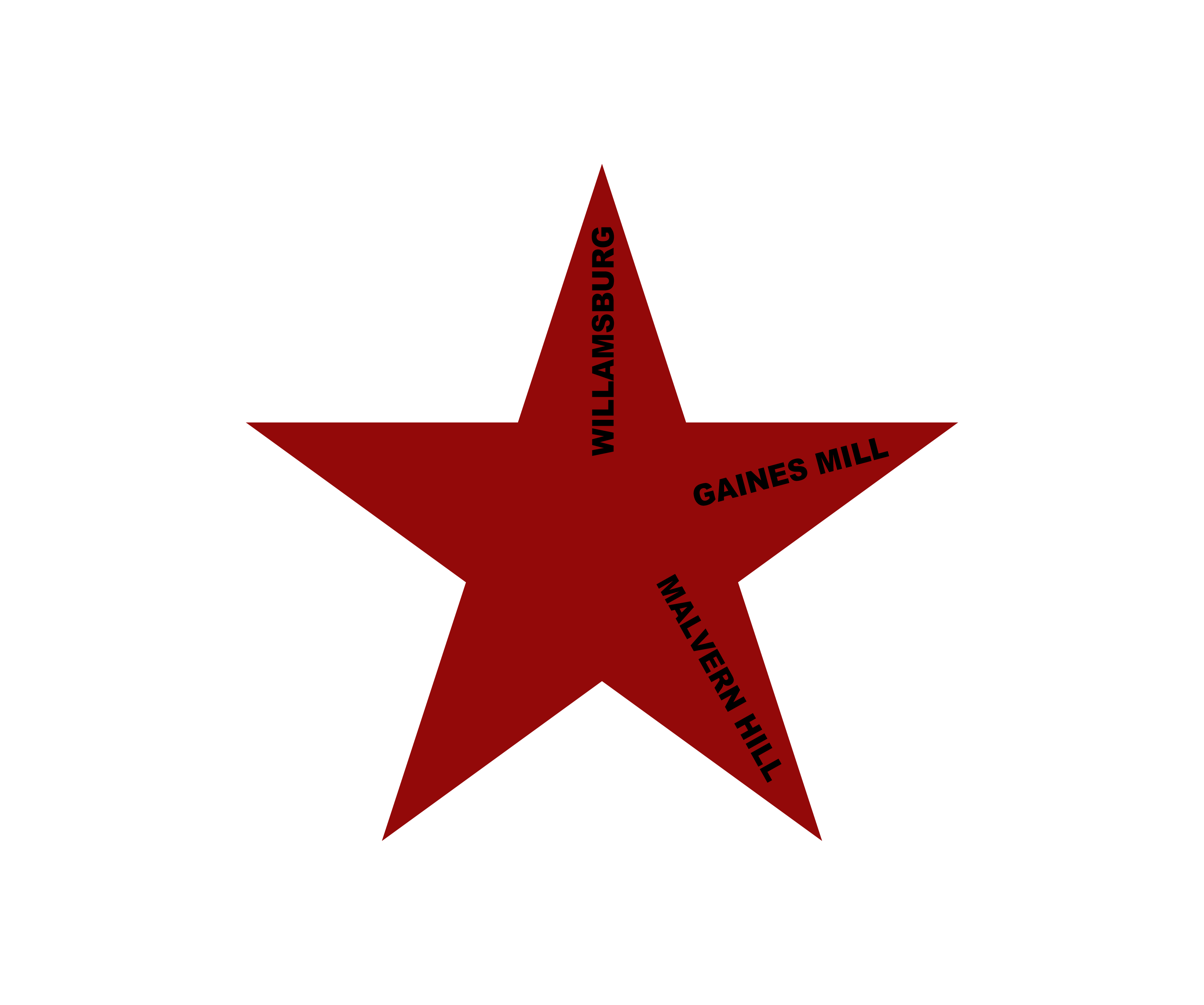
Benjamin F. Fisher’s person flag. Unlike normal signal flags, which had rectangle in the middle. This one had a star with the names of the battles he took part it

Reconstruction of a signal flag with the National flag in the center instead of the red rectangle

Captain David A. Taylor's flag, 1862

== Signal contributions to battles and campaigns ==
=== First Bull Run ===
Monument on Signal Hill, Manassas, Virginia, the site from which Edward Porter Alexander first used wig-wag signaling in combat.

At the First Battle of Bull Run, Confederate Capt. Edward Porter Alexander made history by transmitting the first message in combat using signal flags over a long distance. Stationed atop "Signal Hill" in Manassas, Alexander saw Union troop movements and signaled to the brigade under Col. Nathan "Shanks" Evans, "Look out for your left, your position is turned", which meant that they were in danger of being attacked on their left flank. Upon receiving a similar message, Gens. Beauregard and Joseph E. Johnston sent timely reinforcements that turned the tide of battle in the Confederates' favor.

On the Union side, Myer attempted to deploy a military observation balloon at Manassas, bringing along 20 troops from the 26th Pennsylvania Infantry because of the lack of Signal Corps personnel that early in the war. Because of the haste of these untrained men, the balloon was damaged after a collision with a tree and could not be used for the battle.

=== Fredericksburg ===
At the Battle of Fredericksburg in December 1862, significant use of the Beardslee telegraph made it possible for Maj. Gen. Ambrose E. Burnside to communicate with the Army through the fog and smoke from the burning town. On December 13, the main day of the battle, signal corpsmen extended a line across the Rappahannock River into the town of Fredericksburg while under fire and Burnside was able to communicate with both of his grand division commanders and his supply base, 7.5 miles away.

=== Chancellorsville ===
During the Battle of Chancellorsville in May 1863, the performance of the Beardslee telegraph was so poor that Albert Myer soon decided to replace it. The campaign got off to a bad start because the chief signal officer of the Army of the Potomac, Captain Samuel T. Cushing, was kept in the dark about the plans of Maj. Gen. Joseph Hooker and he could not arrange his signal assets in advance. As the Army advanced, Cushing had insufficient wire on hand and was forced to use untested wire that had been left in the field, supported by iron lances, since Fredericksburg. On April 29, as the Army prepared to cross the Rapidan River, the Beardslee telegraph did not work, probably due to excessive wire length. Captain Frederick E. Beardslee, son of the inventor, was sent to make repairs. He found that the machine had been hit by lightning and was operating erratically. That evening a telegraph reached headquarters from the Ford on the Rapidan at 10:30 p.m., but it was marked (incorrectly) as originating at 5:30 p.m. Maj. Gen. Daniel Butterfield, Chief of Staff of the Army of the Potomac, told Cushing that he was not going to wake the commanding general for any telegram that was five hours late; his repose was "worth more than the commissions of a dozen signal officers." The inadequate wires and the unreliable telegraph caused persistent problems and kept General Hooker isolated from his forces in the Wilderness. On May 1, operators of the U.S. Military Telegraph Service were ordered to replace the Signal Corps Beardslee operators.

It was also at Chancellorsville that a major change happened in Union signal security. Butterfield was concerned about Confederate interception of aerial telegraphy signals, but he used this as an advantage, ordering deceptive messages to be transmitted early in the campaign to mask the Union Army's true intentions. Since the Union signal corpsmen could routinely decipher Confederate messages, Butterfield was able to confirm that his bogus messages had been received. It was after these incidents that the Union began deploying the cipher disc devices and improving the security of their messages.

=== Gettysburg ===
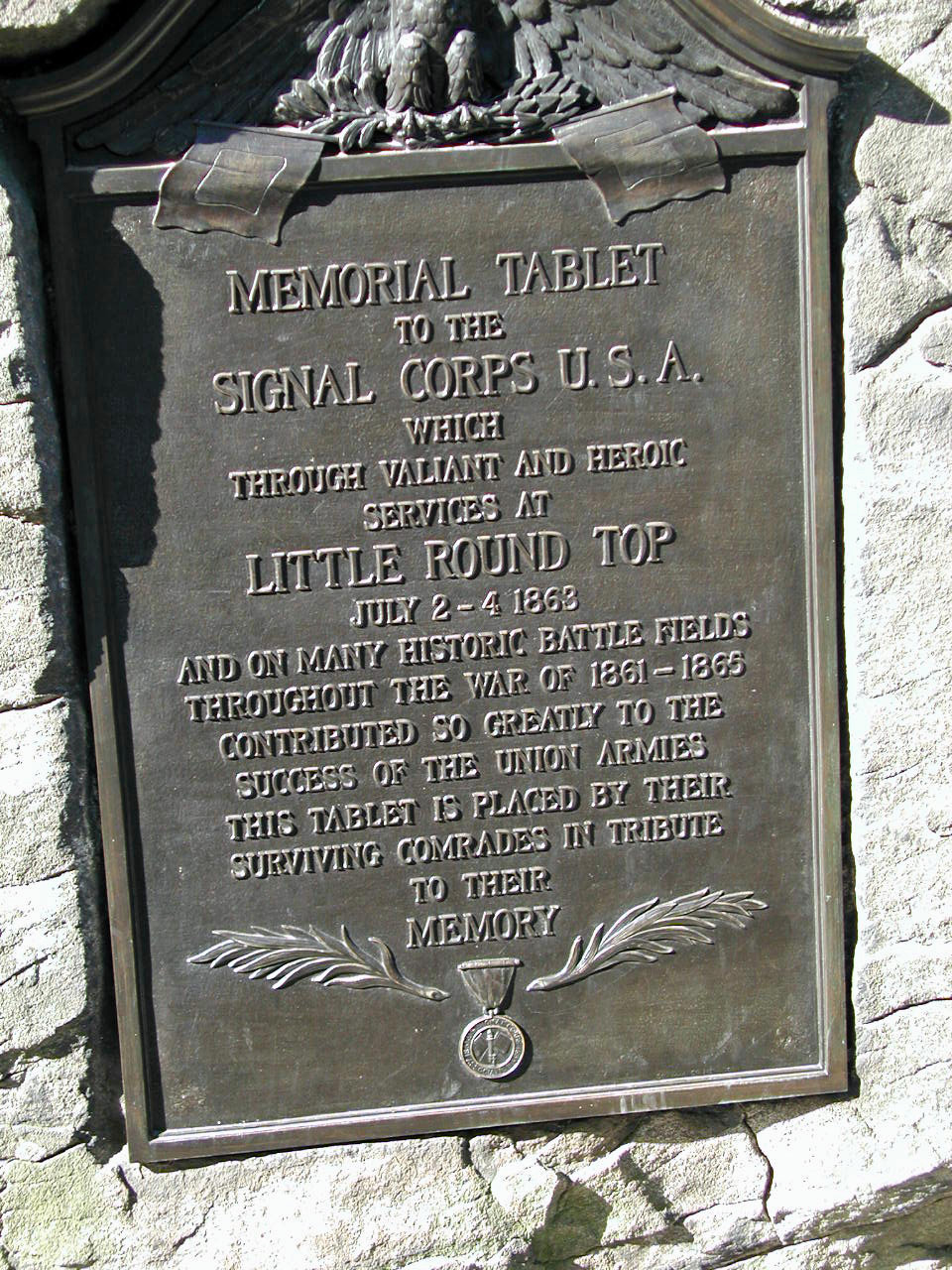
Plaque on Little Round Top, Gettysburg Battlefield.

The Battle of Gettysburg featured the Union Signal Corps in its role of observing the battlefield. The chief signal officer of the Army of the Potomac, Captain Lemuel B. Norton, had field telegraph trains at his disposal, but did not deploy them. On July 1, 1863, a Union signal officer, Lt. Aaron B. Jerome, ascended the cupola of the Lutheran Theological Seminary and the courthouse steeple to observe the enemy's approach and reported to Maj. Gen. Oliver O. Howard. On July 2, the Confederate corps under Lt. Gen. James Longstreet attempted to maneuver into position for an attack on the Union left flank. They were forced into a lengthy counter march, delaying their attack, when they spotted the presence of the Union signal station on Little Round Top mountain and knew that their approach would be reported. During the Confederate assault, the fighting was so heavy that the signal station had to be abandoned until the following day. A plaque commemorating the U.S. Army Signal Corps' contribution to the battle is mounted today on a boulder near the peak of Little Round Top. On July 3, before Pickett's Charge, artillery fire against the Union line was so intense that the signalmen could not use their flags. Captain Edward C. Pierce, a signal officer attached to the VI Corps, acted as a mounted courier to Maj. Gen. George G. Meade's headquarters, despite warnings that he would never make it alive through the firing.

== See also ==
- Flag semaphore systems
