= U.S. Military Telegraph Corps =

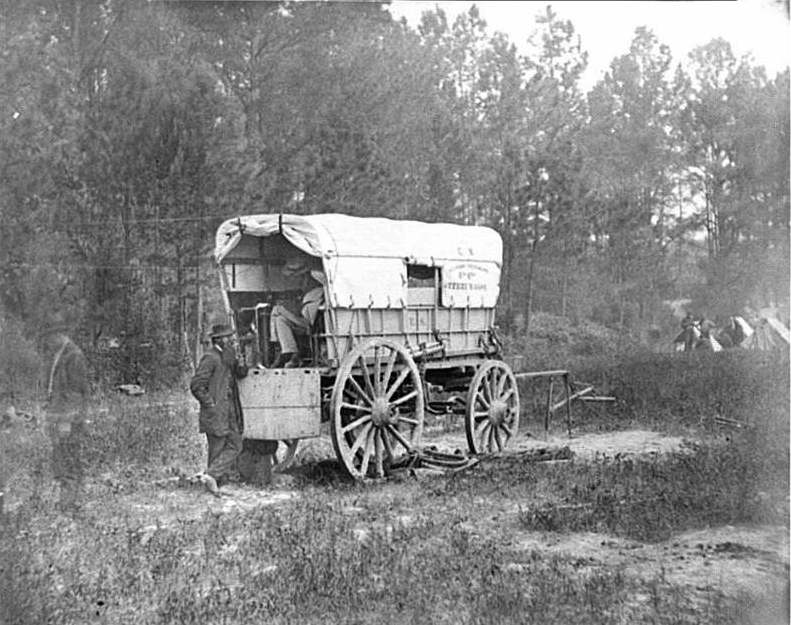
- U.S. Military Telegraph battery wagon, Army of the Potomac headquarters, Petersburg, Virginia, June 1864.

Facts About U.S. Military Telegraph Corps
- Years of Existence: 1861–1866
- Number of Employees: Over 1500
- Line Constructed: 15,389 miles
- Total Expenditure: $3,219,400

The U.S. Military Telegraph Corps was formed in 1861 following the outbreak of the American Civil War. David Strouse, Samuel M. Brown, Richard O'Brian and David H. Bates, all from the Pennsylvania Railroad Company, were sent to Washington, D.C. to serve in the newly created office. In October of that year, Anson Stager was appointed department head. During the war, they were charged with maintaining communications between the federal government in Washington and the commanding officers of the far-flung units of the Union Army.

The US Army had telegraph service before creation of the U.S. Military Telegraph Corps. In Missouri one was built from Jefferson Barracks south of St. Louis to Ft. Smith, AR in 1858. The Springfield-St. Louis Road the line followed later became known as the Old Wire Road, a forerunner of Route 66, now I-44.

== Telegraph facilities prior to the Civil War ==
Before the start of the Civil War, there were three major telegraph companies in operation: the American Telegraph Company, the Western Union Telegraph Company, and the Southwestern Telegraph Company. The American Telegraph Company's lines occupied the entire region east of the Hudson River and ran all along the Atlantic coast down to the Gulf of Mexico. Cities were connected from Newfoundland to New Orleans. From this main backbone, the American Telegraph Company's lines branched west to cities like Pittsburgh, Philadelphia, and Cincinnati. At each of these points, the American Telegraph Company's lines met the Western Union lines which occupied much of the remaining northern portion of the U.S. Western Union also extended a line as far west as San Francisco by 1861. In the southern states, the American Telegraph Company's lines met the Southwestern Telegraph Company's lines at Chattanooga, Mobile, and New Orleans. From these cities, the Southwestern Telegraph Company's lines occupied the rest of the South and Southwest, including Texas and Arkansas.

== Formation of Military Telegraph Corps ==
Not long after the Confederate attack on Fort Sumter on April 12, 1861 President Abraham Lincoln ordered seventy-five thousand troops to assemble in Washington, D.C. On April 19, 1861, Harpers Ferry, West Virginia (which was along the Baltimore & Ohio Railroad) was captured by Confederate troops. Thus, Washington lost one of its only railroad and telegraphic communications route to the North. The only railroad and telegraph lines connecting the Northern states to Washington left were located in Maryland, a state whose loyalty to the Union was not trusted.

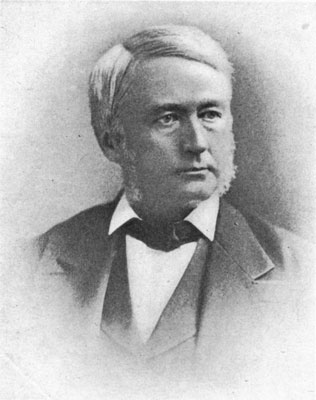
Thomas A. Scott became Assistant Secretary of War in 1861 and helped establish the U.S. Military Telegraph Corps

Due to the dire situation of the railroads and telegraphic communication in Washington, the commercial telegraph lines surrounding the city were seized and Simon Cameron, the Secretary of War, sent a request to the president of the Pennsylvania Railroad to send Thomas A. Scott to get the railroad telegraph service in Washington under control. Scott made his way to Washington and began filling positions to help him manage the railroads and telegraph lines. He asked Andrew Carnegie, who was superintendent of the Pittsburgh division of the Pennsylvania Railroad to assist him. Carnegie obliged and drafted men from his railroad division to accompany him to Washington in order to help the government take possession of and operate the railroads around the capital.

Carnegie's first task when he arrived in Washington was to extend the Baltimore & Ohio Railroad from its old depot in Washington across the Potomac River into Virginia. While extending the Baltimore & Ohio Railroad, telegraph lines were built and communication was opened at stations such as Alexandria, Burke's Station, and Fairfax. The first government telegraph line built connected the War Office with the Navy Yard. Carnegie stayed in Washington until November 1861. By the time he left, the military railroad and telegraph operations were running smoothly.

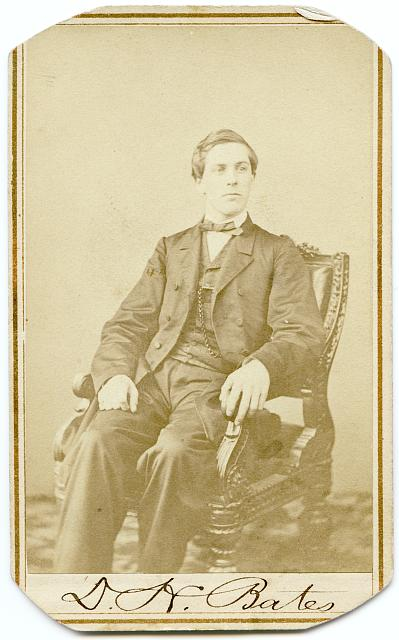
David Homer Bates was one of the original four operators of the U.S. Military Telegraph Corps. The other three were Samuel M. Brown, David Strouse and Richard O'Brien.

Along with the appointment of Carnegie, Scott made a demand for telegraph operators who excelled at running trains by telegraph. Scott called on four telegraph operators from the Pennsylvania Railroad to report to Washington. These operators were David Strouse (who later became the superintendent of the Military Telegraph Corps), D.H. Bates, Samuel M. Brown, and Richard O'Brien. The four operators arrived in Washington on April 27, 1861. Strouse and Bates were stationed at the War Department; Brown was stationed in the Navy Yard; and O'Brien was stationed at the Baltimore & Ohio Railroad depot, which was for some time army headquarters. Thus, these four men made up the initial United States Military Telegraph Corps, which would ultimately grow to a force of over 1,500 men.

In June, 1863, Albert Brown Chandler joined the corps and began work at the War Department as a disbursing clerk, cashier, and telegraph operator. He developed ciphers for transmitting secret communications, and worked with Thomas Eckert and Charles A. Tinker as confidential telegraphers for Lincoln and Secretary of War Edwin Stanton.

== Special status of the corps ==
Although the U.S. Military Telegraph Corps played a prominent role in transmitting messages to and from commanders in the battlefield, it functioned independently from military control. The Corps employed civilian operators out on the battlefield and in the War Department. Only supervisory personnel were granted military commissions from the Quartermaster Department in order to distribute funds and property. All of the orders the telegraph operators received came directly from the Secretary of War. Also, because there was no government telegraph organization before the Civil War, there was no appropriation of funds by Congress to pay for the expenses of erecting poles, running cables, or the salaries of operators. As a result, the first six months that the U.S. Military Telegraph Corps was in operation Edward S. Sanford, president of the American Telegraph Company, paid for all these expenses. He was later reimbursed by Congress for his generosity.

== Construction of telegraph lines ==
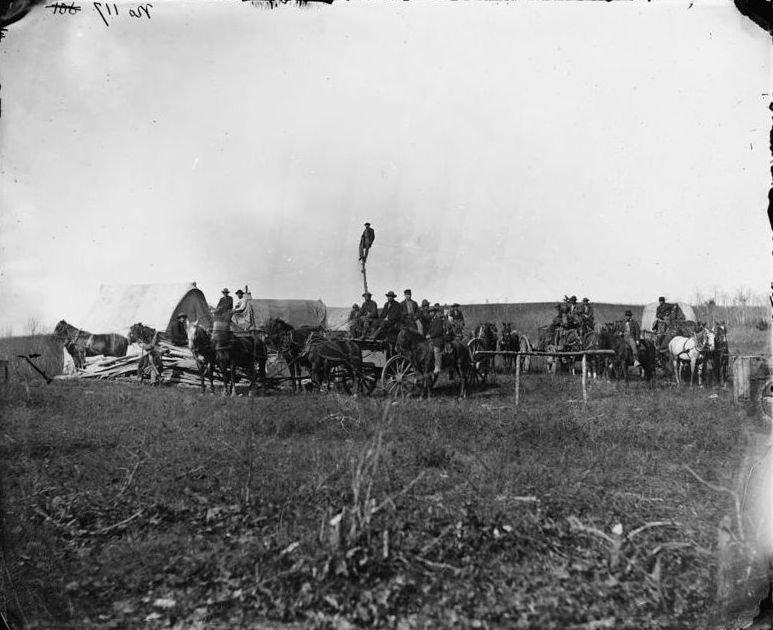
Men and equipment of the U.S. Military Telegraph Construction Corps, Brandy Station, Va., February 1864.

The Telegraph Construction Corps were charged with the dangerous job of building telegraph lines in the field during battles. Consisting of about one hundred fifty men, the Telegraph Construction Corps set out in wagon trains to construct temporary lines. During a battle, one wagon was stationed at the starting point of the battle to act as a receiving station, while another wagon traveled into the field to be a sending station. Thus, the orders could be sent back and forth between general headquarters and the battlefield, and what occurred during the battles could be sent back to the Military Telegraph Office in Washington, D.C.

Initially these telegraph lines were only constructed for temporary use because of the brittle exposed copper wire that was used. But, after insulated wire began to be used, permanent lines were built. The Telegraph Construction Corps would load a coil of this wire on a mule's back and lead it straight forward to unreel the wire. As the mule moved forward unwinding the wire, two men followed and hung the line on fences and bushes so that it would not be run over until it was propped up with pikes. Because these lines were so vulnerable to Confederate wire tapping and cutting, cavalry patrols kept guard of the wires when they were being built in an area lacking in Union soldiers. Over the course of the war, the Telegraph Construction Corps built a total of 15,389 miles of field, land, and submarine telegraph lines.

== Operators ==
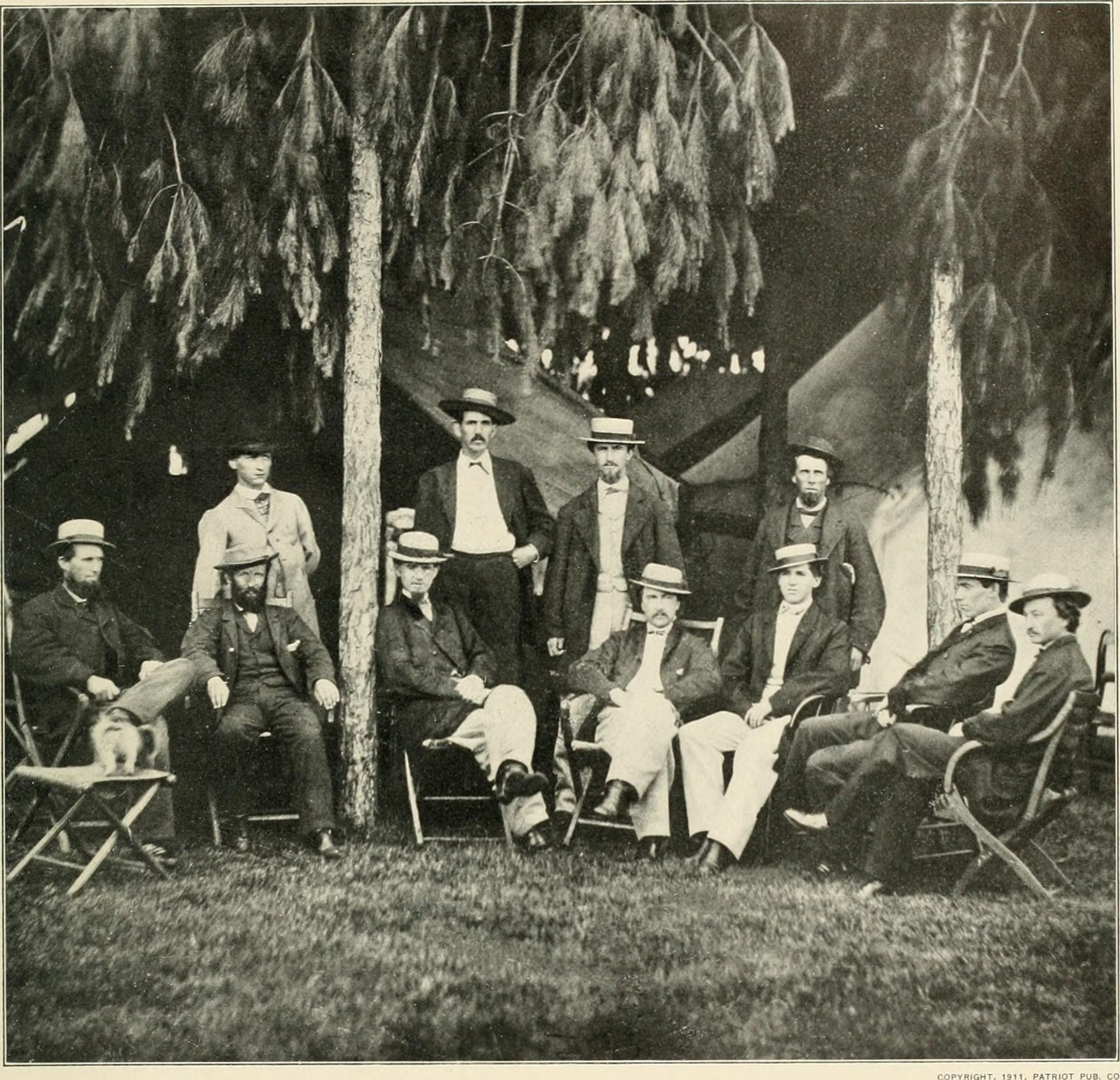
Union cipher operators in Vicksburg, June 1865.

Serving as a U.S. Military Telegraph Corps operators, whether in the field or in the War Office was a hard and thankless job. The operators that served on the battlefield had the more dangerous job of the two. They encountered the constant threat of being captured, shot, or killed by Confederate troops whether they were establishing communications on the battle front, sending messages behind during a retreat, or venturing out to repair a line. Telegraph operators faced a casualty rate of ten percent, a rate similar to the infantry men they served with. Added to these dangers was the strenuous relationship the operators had with the military commanders they served under. Many of the commanders resented the Military Telegraph Corps operators because they were not members of the military, but employees of the Quartermasters Department. As a result, these commanders felt that the operators were not fit to serve with them and ultimately distrusted these men.

Although the job of an operator in the War Office was not as dangerous, it was still a demanding job. The operators had to be quick and intelligent when receiving messages. Important messages were sent using cipher codes. The cipher-operators had the major responsibility of decoding these viable pieces of information and moving the information along to higher-ranking officials or President Lincoln, who frequently visited the Military Telegraph office in the War Department building. Along with decoding Union telegrams, the cipher-operators also had to decode Confederate ciphers. By decoding the Confederate cipher codes, plots such as setting fire to major hotels in New York City were averted.

The U.S. Military Telegraph Corps operators served courageously during the Civil War. But, because these men were not members of the military, they did not receive recognition or a pension for their services, even though the supervisory personnel did because of the military commissions they received. As a result, the families of those men killed in action had to depend on charity to continue on. The operators of the U.S. Military Telegraph Corps were not recognized for their service until 1897, when then-President Grover Cleveland approved an act directing the Secretary of War to issue certificates of honorable service to all members (including those who died) of the U.S. Military Telegraph Corps. This certificate of recognition did not include the pension former service-members sought.

== Disbanding ==
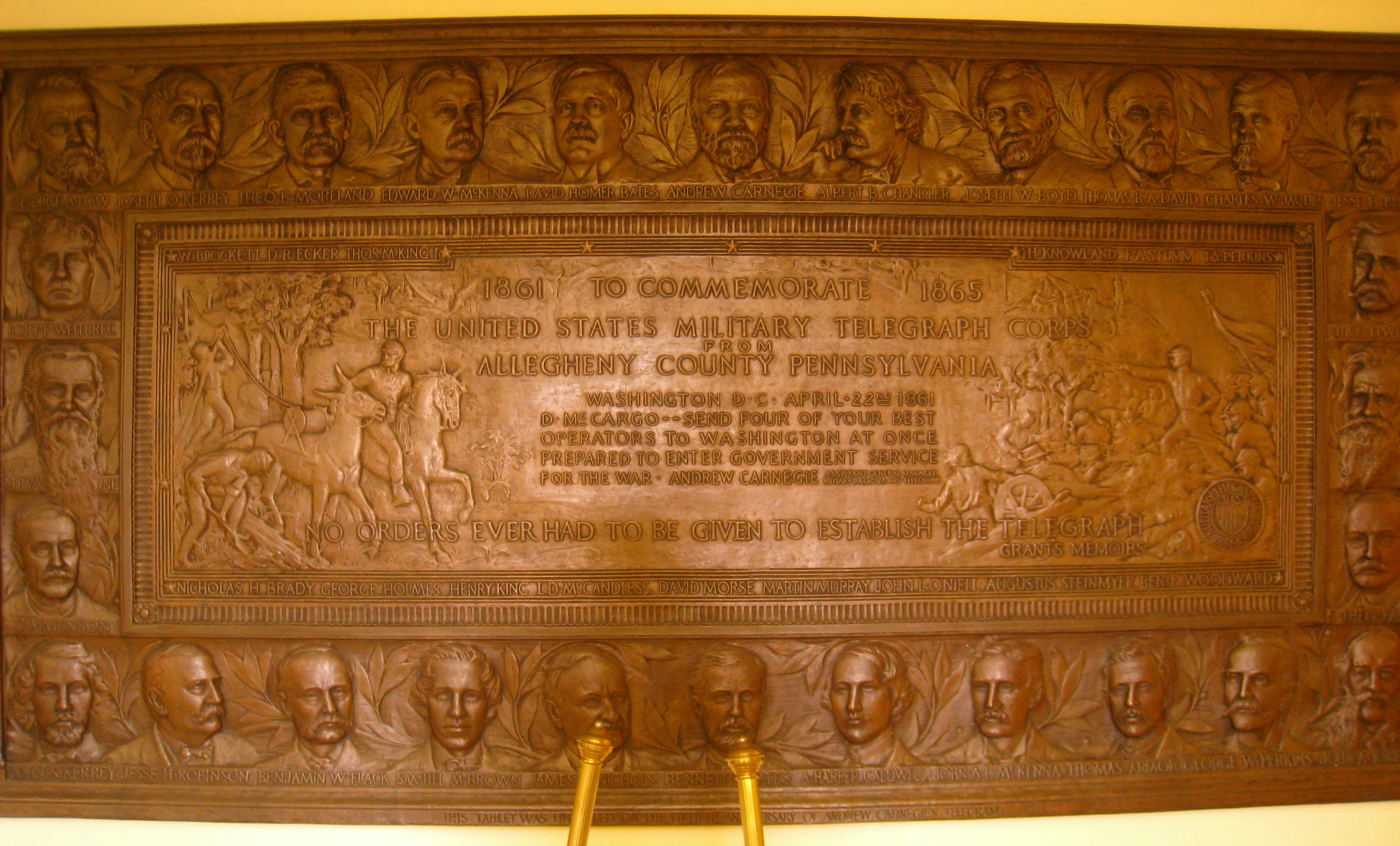
Plaque commemorating members of the U.S. Military Telegraph Corps from Allegheny County, Pennsylvania.

Once the Civil War was over the task of reconstructing the Confederate telegraph lines began. The U.S. government required that all of the major communication lines were to be repaired and controlled by the U.S. Military Telegraph Corps. Due to the lack of funds, the Confederate telegraph lines were in bad shape when the war ended and the operators of the U.S. Military Telegraph Corps faced a mountain of work. But these men rose to the challenge and on February 27, 1865 an order by the Quartermaster General transferred the Union control of telegraph lines in the South to commercial telegraph companies under the supervision of U.S. Military Telegraph Corps Assistant Superintendents . Furthermore, this order relinquished control of all lines seized by the government in the North and sold the lines constructed by the U.S. Military Telegraph Corps to private telegraph companies. Once control of the telegraph lines were turned over to the telegraph companies, the operators were discharged one by one. The only office that remained was the original telegraph office in the War Department.
