= Wigwag (flag signals) =

Method of flag signaling

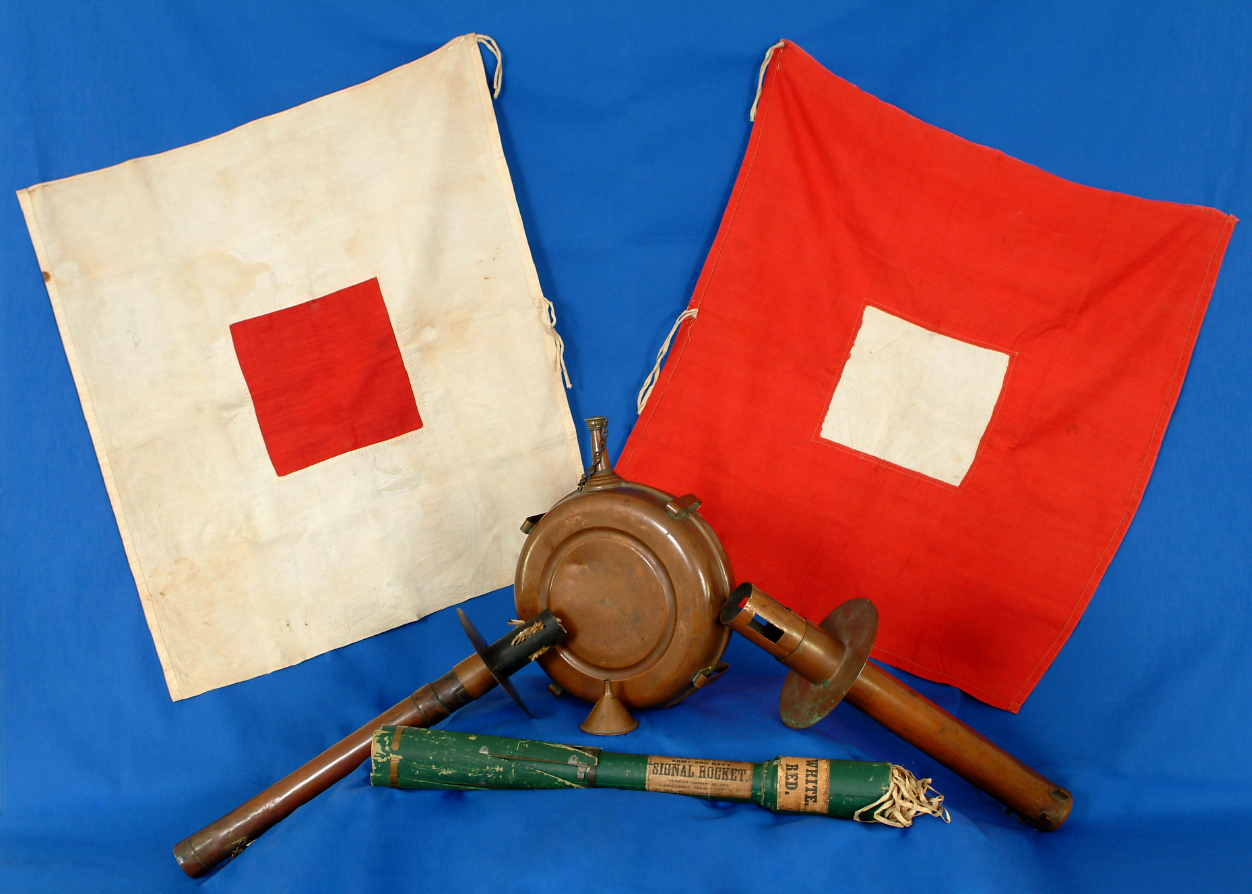
Wigwag flags, wigwag torches and kerosene canteen, and a signal rocket

Wigwag (more formally, aerial telegraphy) is an historical form of flag signaling that passes messages by waving a single flag. It differs from flag semaphore in that it uses one flag rather than two, and the symbols for each letter are represented by the motion of the flag rather than its position. The larger flag and its motion allow messages to be read over greater distances than semaphore. Messages could be sent at night using torches instead of flags.

The most common code used with wigwag had three motions, only two of which were needed to form letters of the alphabet. These two were waving the flag, respectively, to the left and right – the wigwagging motion. A character was formed by sequentially displaying a number of motions (elements). Like Morse code, the number of elements in each character was not fixed, the most common letters being assigned the shortest codes. A number of other codes were used at times, some of them with a fixed number of elements and up to four different motions. Morse code was used with wigwag after it became an international standard.

The wigwag system was invented in the 1850s by US Army surgeon Albert J. Myer who became the first Chief Signal Officer of the US Army in command of the Signal Corps. Wigwag was used extensively by both sides in the American Civil War, where it was an essential adjunct to electrical telegraphy, and continued to see use in both America and Europe until the end of the century. After that, long-distance communication was performed by electrical telegraphy, or in some places where the telegraph was not available, by heliograph. This communication system was in use with the US Navy until the twentieth century.

== Operation ==
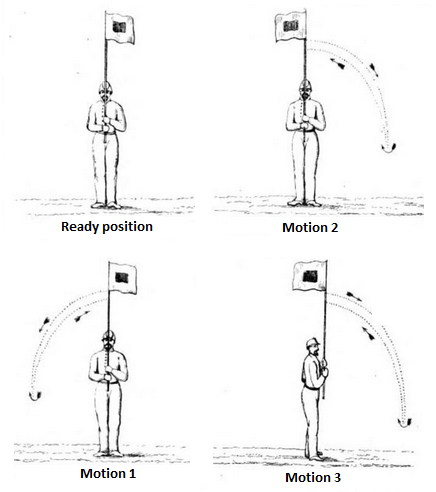
The basic wigwag signaling motions

The wigwag system consisted of a signalman waving a single large flag or other display device in different motions sequentially. At night, a lamp on a pole could be used, or over short distances the signalman might hold a small disk. The usual wigwag code was ternary, that is, there were three different motions (symbols) that could be displayed. However, only two of these symbols were used for letters, making it largely binary. The third symbol only appeared in control characters. The neutral position was the signalman holding the flag vertically and motionless above his head. The first motion was initiated by bringing the device downward on the signalman's right side and then quickly returning it to its upright position. The second motion brought the device down on the left side and then returned it to the starting position. The third motion lowered the device in front of the signalman, then restored it to its vertical position.

Like Morse code, the normal wigwag code did not have a fixed length (number of elements) for each character. For instance, i was coded as "1", but d was coded as "222". The table shows the commonly used wigwag code and the diagram shows the flag motions. It is as defined in the General Service Code of July 1864 issued to standardize signals of the US Army and Navy. Further details of the code and an alternate four-symbol representation are given in § Code details

Wigwag code (General Service Code)
A	B	C	D	E	F	G	H	I	J	K	L	M
22	2112	121	222	12	2221	2211	122	1	1122	2121	221	1221
N	O	P	Q	R	S	T	U	V	W	X	Y	Z
11	21	1212	1211	211	212	2	112	1222	1121	2122	111	2222

The notation of the wigwag code was originally defined as "1" representing the motion to the left and "2" representing the motion to the right. That is, all occurrences of "1" and "2" are interchanged in the table. This was changed when the General Service Code was issued. The thinking was that the motion to the left should be notated with the lowest digit, but as seen through a telescope (the usual method of observing) the image is inverted with left and right interchanged. The code tabulated in some modern sources shows this earlier notation with "1" and "2" interchanged.

To open communication, the signalman waves the flag continuously from side to side (the "attention" signal) until the receiving station replies with the "understood" signal (22.22.22.3). The transmitting station replies with the "understood" signal and proceeds to send the message. The elements of a character are performed rapidly without pause between them, only returning the flag to the rest position at the end of the character. The US Army Manual of Signals lists several alternative codes, including a three-element fixed-length code using four symbols (1866 edition), and a three-element fixed-length code using three symbols (1872 edition). There is no indication in the manual that these codes were actually in use.

Available colors for wigwag flags

Wigwag has an advantage over flag semaphore in that only one flag is used instead of two. Thus, both arms could be used to raise the flag and a larger, heavier flag could be employed. Nevertheless, signalmen required great strength to use a 4-foot flag on a 16-foot pole. Even a light wind would multiply the difficulty and rain made the flag heavier. Contemporary flags were heavier than modern equivalents, being made of linen or cotton. Modern large flags designed to be hand held might be made of lighter silk or nylon and are more resistant to moisture retention. Perhaps even more importantly, the signaling elements in wigwag consist of motions rather than positions as in flag semaphore. Motions are easier to distinguish than positions at great distances, thus giving wigwag a range advantage.

=== Flags and disks ===
The flags came in seven combinations of colors and sizes. They were all square flags with a smaller square (one third the width) of a different color in the center. The colors available were a white flag with a red center, a black flag with a white center, and a red flag with a white center. All three were produced in the most commonly used four foot (120 cm) size. The white and black flags came in a six-foot (180 cm) size for greater range, and the white and red flags had a two-foot (60 cm) size. The size and color of flag was chosen depending on lighting conditions and distance. The white flag was the most common and was used against dark backgrounds. Against light or varied backgrounds, the red flag was more effective and was also used at sea. The black flag was used against a background of snow. The two foot flags, called action flags, were used in situations where the signalman needed to stay under cover from enemy fire or wished to signal less obtrusively. Each flag had a number of ties or tapes sewn along the hoist edge. These were used to fix the flag to a four-section staff, each section four feet long and fitted with ferrules for joining.

The disks were 12 to 18 inches (30 to 46 cm) in diameter and were made of metal or wood frames with canvas surfaces. Somewhat easier to handle than the heavy flags, they provided a different method for daylight communications. The lights were kerosene lanterns attached to a staff. A second "foot torch" was placed on the ground before the signalman as a fixed point of reference, making it easier for the recipient to follow the lantern's movements. A 30X telescope was a standard part of the wigwag kit. This was used by a signaler alongside the flagman to read the signals from the remote station, which could be at a distance of up to 20 miles.

== History ==
The wigwag system filled a gap in the history of military communication between the age of close-quarter fighting and the age of modern long-range weapons. In the 1860s, radio and telephone communications had yet to be invented and electrical telegraphy, although established, was still in its infancy. It was still being worked out how the latter could be used on the battlefield, and portable equipment ruggedized for military use was not available early in the decade. Wigwag provided a method that was both simple to use and faster and more reliable than couriers. By the start of World War I, the range and accuracy of modern weapons had made flag signaling too dangerous to use on the front line, and more sophisticated technology was then available.

=== Development ===
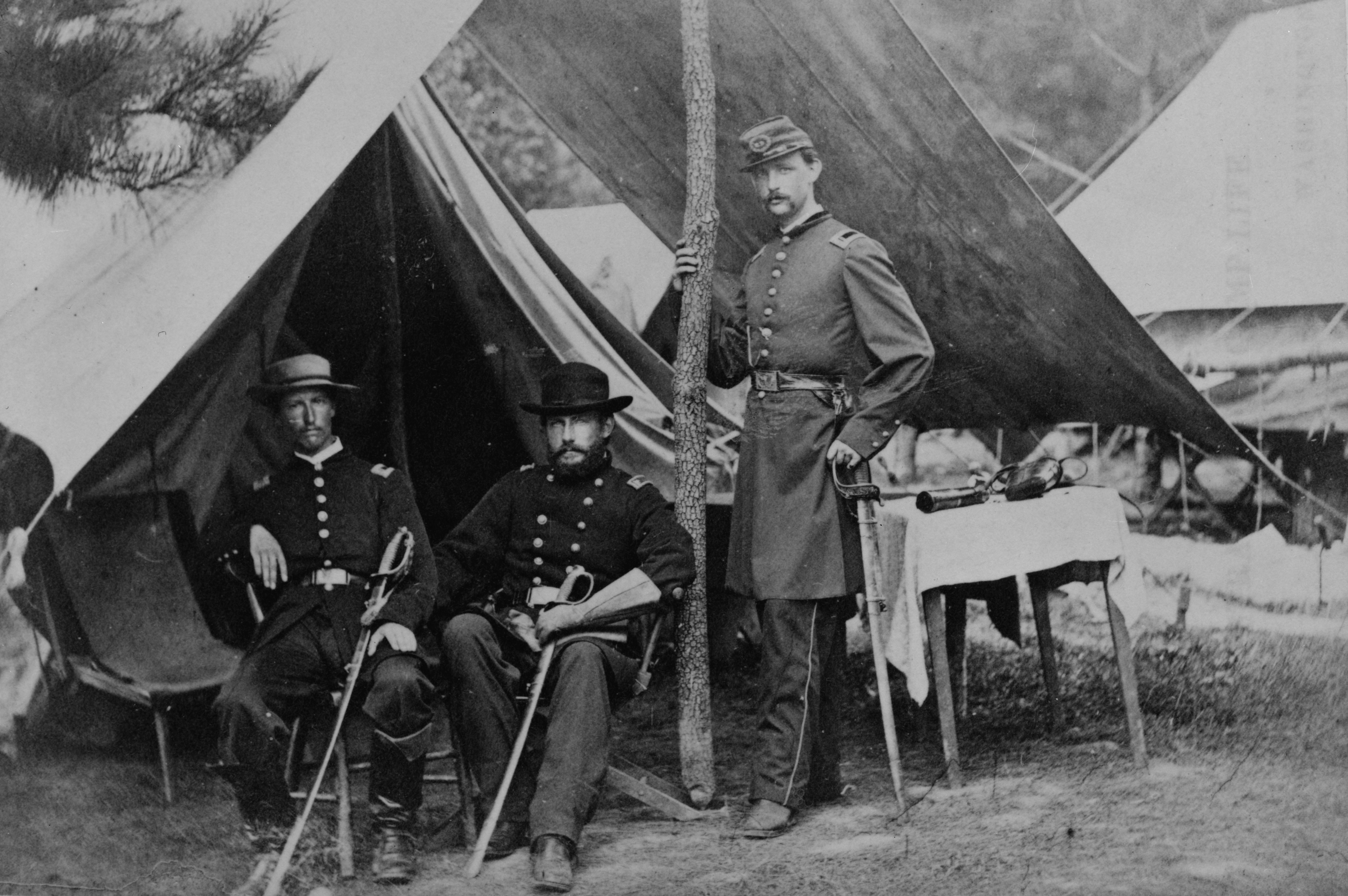
Albert J. Myer (center) during the Peninsula campaign (1862) of the American Civil War

The wigwag system was invented by US Army surgeon Major Albert J. Myer in the 1850s. Myer took his inspiration from the telegraph code of Alexander Bain, although the codepoints finally used were not the same as Bain's. The Bain code, invented 1843, was used on the chemical printing telegraph of that inventor and was a dot-dash code similar to the Morse code. Myer came across it while working as a telegraph operator, work he did for a period after his graduation in 1847. In 1851, Myer produced A New Sign Language for Deaf Mutes as the thesis for his medical doctorate. In this publication Myer used the Bain code as the basis for communication with a deaf person by tapping a hand or cheek. Alternatively, tapping a table with which the person was also in contact could be used to pass messages. In 1854, Myer joined the army as an assistant surgeon and was posted to Texas. It was in Texas that he developed the idea of the wigwag flag or torch code for military use, building on his previous work with the deaf. Myer also incorporated features of Native American hand and smoke signals into his system.

In 1856, while stationed at Fort Duncan, Texas, Myer wrote to Jefferson Davis, then Secretary of War, proposing his signaling system. He was supported by Joseph Gilbert Totten the Army Chief of Engineers but failed to get a hearing due to lack of detail in his proposal. In 1857, Totten tried again with a new Secretary of War, John B. Floyd. In 1859, a board of examination under Robert E. Lee considered the proposal but thought it had only limited use. They did not put it into operation but allowed Myer to continue with tests. Myer conducted these tests starting in April, initially at Fort Monroe, Virginia, and later in New York and Washington.

Myer, with Floyd's support, proposed that a new post of signal officer to the Army staff should be created, with him filling it. In February 1860, Myer got a hearing before the Senate Committee on Military Affairs under the chairmanship of Jefferson Davis which supported the introduction of the system. Davis opposed the creation of the signal officer post when it came before congress; he wanted to use the signaling system but feared the creation of the signal officer post would lead to the creation of a new department (the future Signal Corps). Davis's objections were ignored and Myer was made signal officer and promoted to major in June 1860. Myer submitted a patent application in 1860 claiming the rights to all signaling systems based on motions (of which wigwag is an example) as opposed to positions (of which flag semaphore is an example). The patent was granted in January 1861.

=== In service ===
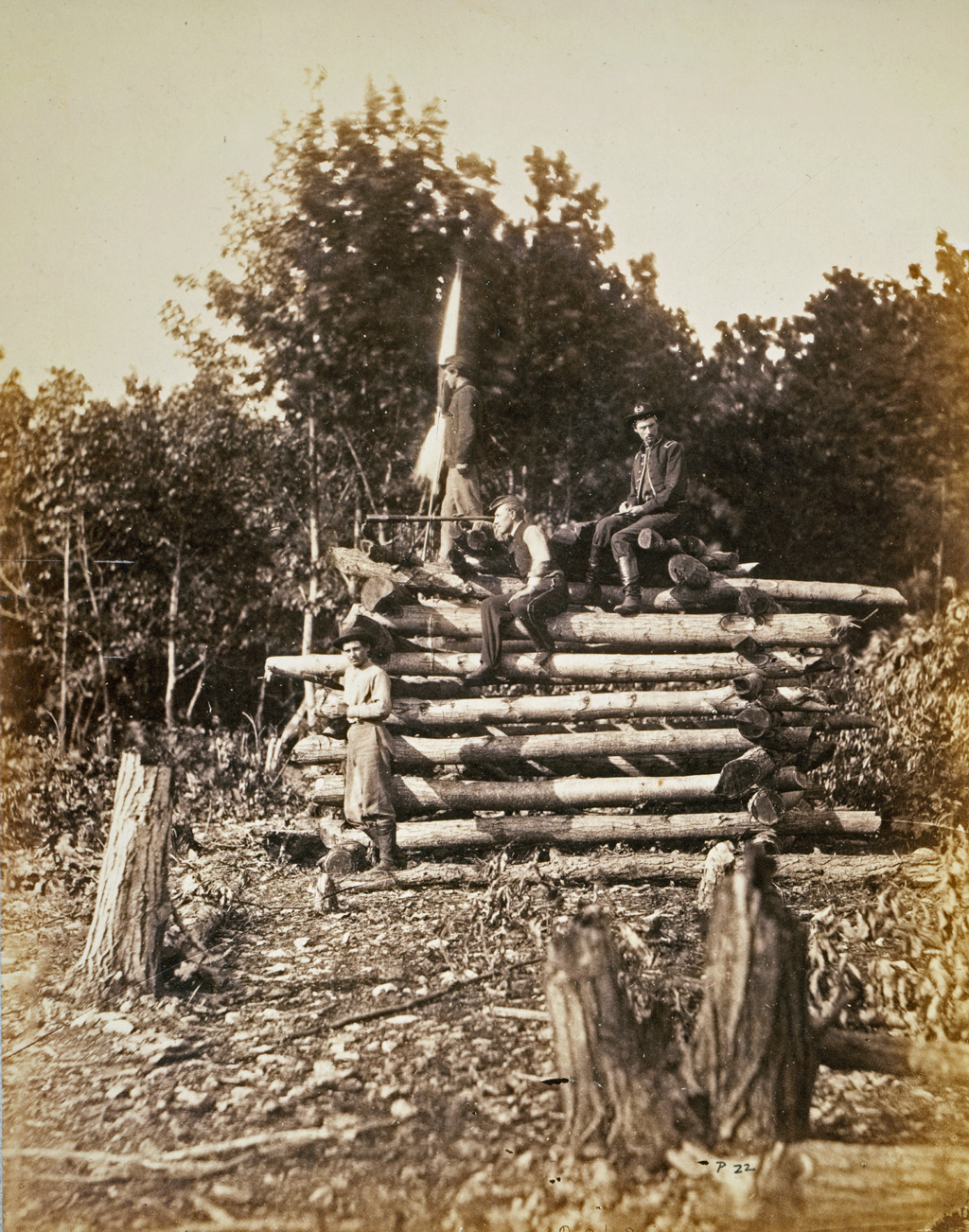
A wigwag station on Elk Ridge, Maryland, during the Battle of Antietam

The first live use of the system was in 1860 in a campaign against the Navajo in the Department of New Mexico. Myer served under Major Edward Canby who became a strong supporter of the formation of a signal corps, which he thought more efficient than Myer's proposal to train every officer. The Navajo war was over by February 1861, but at the same time the American Civil War was beginning. Up to this point, Myer had been temporarily assigned men from the units in which he served to work as signalers, often grudgingly. This was impractical for a large scale war and Myer now pressed for Canby's idea of a dedicated signal corps. Many in Washington opposed the idea, and it took until 3 March 1863 before the Signal Corps was formally inaugurated, although the signalers had been informally called "signal corps" for some time. Myer was put in charge with the rank of Colonel.

==== American Civil War ====
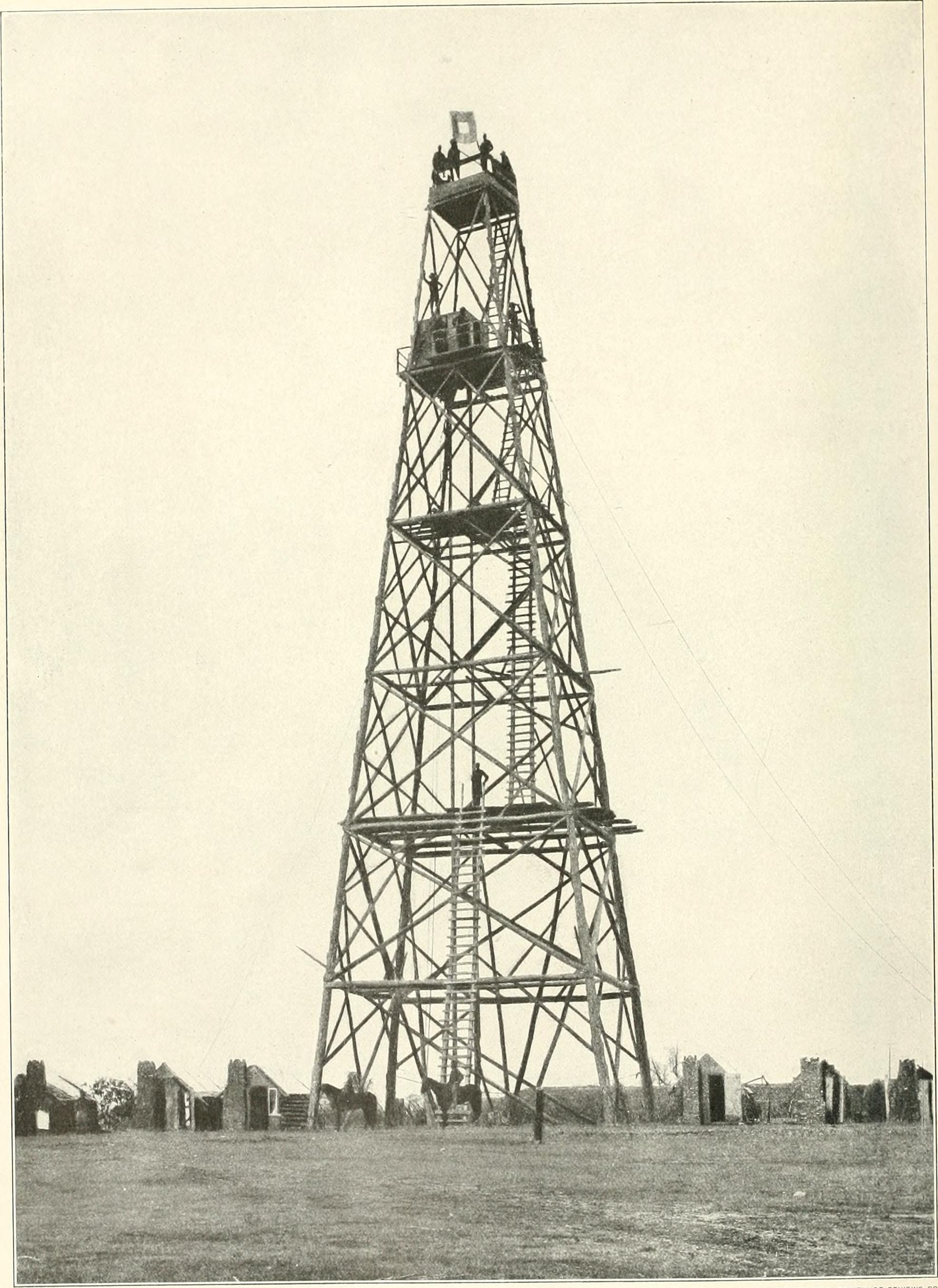
The Cobb's Hill wigwag tower, 1864

Wigwag was used extensively by Civil War Signal Corps troops on both sides, and was an essential supplement to the electrical telegraph. Its first use in battle was by Confederate Lieutenant Edward Porter Alexander (a former pupil of Myer) at the First Battle of Bull Run in 1861. The signalmen on this occasion fulfilled an important function by reporting a Union attempt to turn the Confederate flank. Myer had originally promoted the idea as a lightweight mobile system that could be carried by a single man – a common task for signalmen was to act as forward observers reporting artillery fall of shot. As the war progressed, more substantial stations were constructed. Enormous towers, some well over 100 feet, were built. The Cobb's Hill tower shown in the image was built by the Appomattox River in June 1864. The 125 foot (38 m) height of the Cobb's Hill tower gave it such a good view of Confederate movements that they assigned a gun battery specifically to destroy it. They failed to achieve this and the tower remained in use until the fall of Petersburg to Union forces.

Wherever possible, existing structures were used as signaling stations. Building stations in trees was common, and church steeples were often used. The system, at least on the Union side, took on the nature of a genuine communications network. The Confederates, despite being first in the field with wigwag, and the Union side being slow to get going, never succeeded in building a network to the same extent. The Confederate Signal Corps was simply not given resources on the same scale.

The mere existence of a flag station could cause problems for the enemy. Alexander, in his memoirs, referred to the Little Round Top station as "that wretched little signal station" because he was forced to make roundabout movements of his troops and artillery to avoid being observed (at this time, 1863, Alexander was no longer connected with wigwag signalling, but was in command of the artillery at the Battle of Gettysburg). The Confederates had tried but failed to seize the Little Round Top position several times, including during Pickett's Charge. During that action one of the Union defenders, Captain Davis E. Castle, continued to signal with a bedsheet after the flagman had retreated with the flags.

Signalmen were sometimes assigned to ships to maintain communication between the navy and land forces. On large operations they might also be used for ship-to-ship communication. The signalman was posted high up on the masthead of the ship. This was especially common on operations concerning the Mississippi River such as the Vicksburg campaign and the siege of Port Hudson.

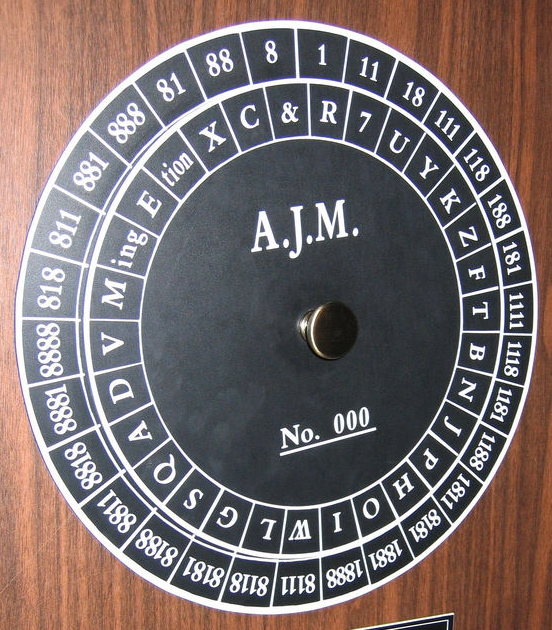
A Union cipher disk

The fact that the Confederates had personnel able to read the wigwag code was problematic for the Union side. Security concerns led to a reluctance to send important messages by flag signals. General Daniel Butterfield went so far as to order the Army of the Potomac not to use signals at all, much to the concern of its chief signal officer Benjamin F. Fisher. To overcome this problem, the Signal Corps created a cipher disk to encode messages. It is believed that the Confederates never broke this code. The Union side was able to read Confederate flag signals without being discovered until at least 1864 when Myer's successor as head of the Signal Corps, William J. L. Nicodemus, published the fact in a pamphlet. Nicodemus was dismissed in December 1864 for this breach of security and replaced by Fisher.

Myer did not use the term wigwag in the manuals he produced. He called the system aerial signals or aerial telegraphy. The system probably came to be known as wigwag because of the apparently random motions of the flag as seen by an untrained observer.

==== Signal station gallery ====
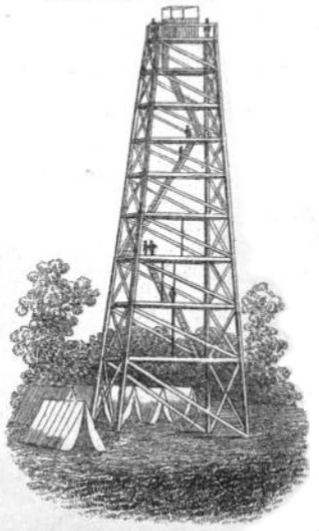
A 130 foot wigwag tower used in operations against Richmond

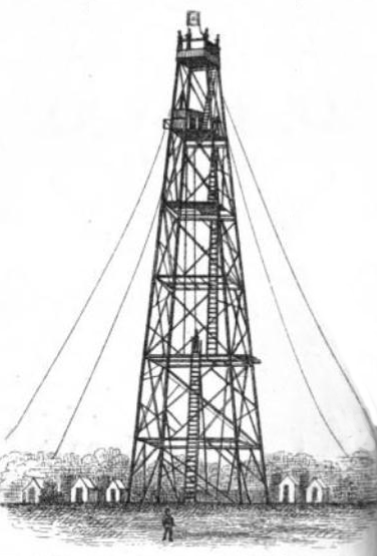
125 foot wigwag tower used in operations against Richmond

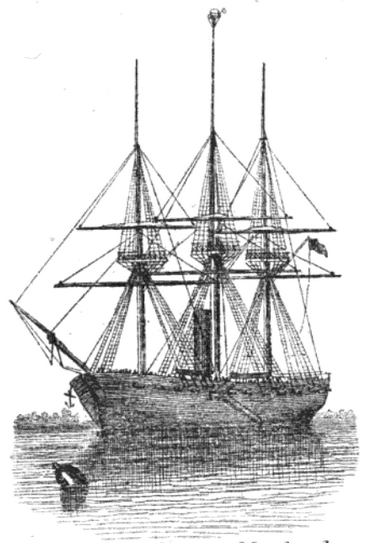
Wigwag station on the masthead of a US ship at Richmond

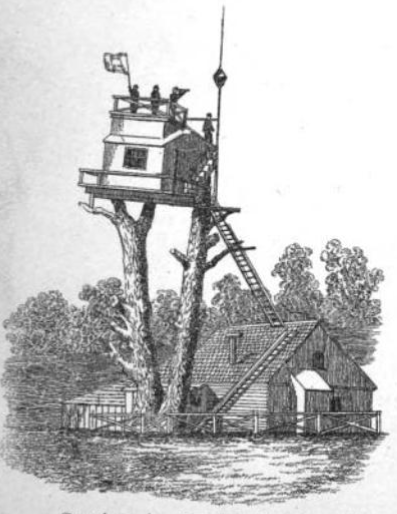
Wigwag station near Washington

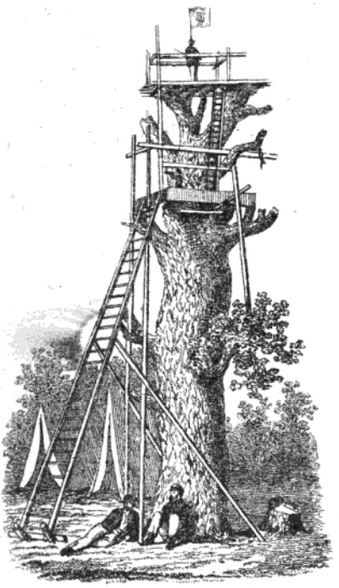
Wigwag station in a tree on the Upper Potomac River

==== Other campaigns ====
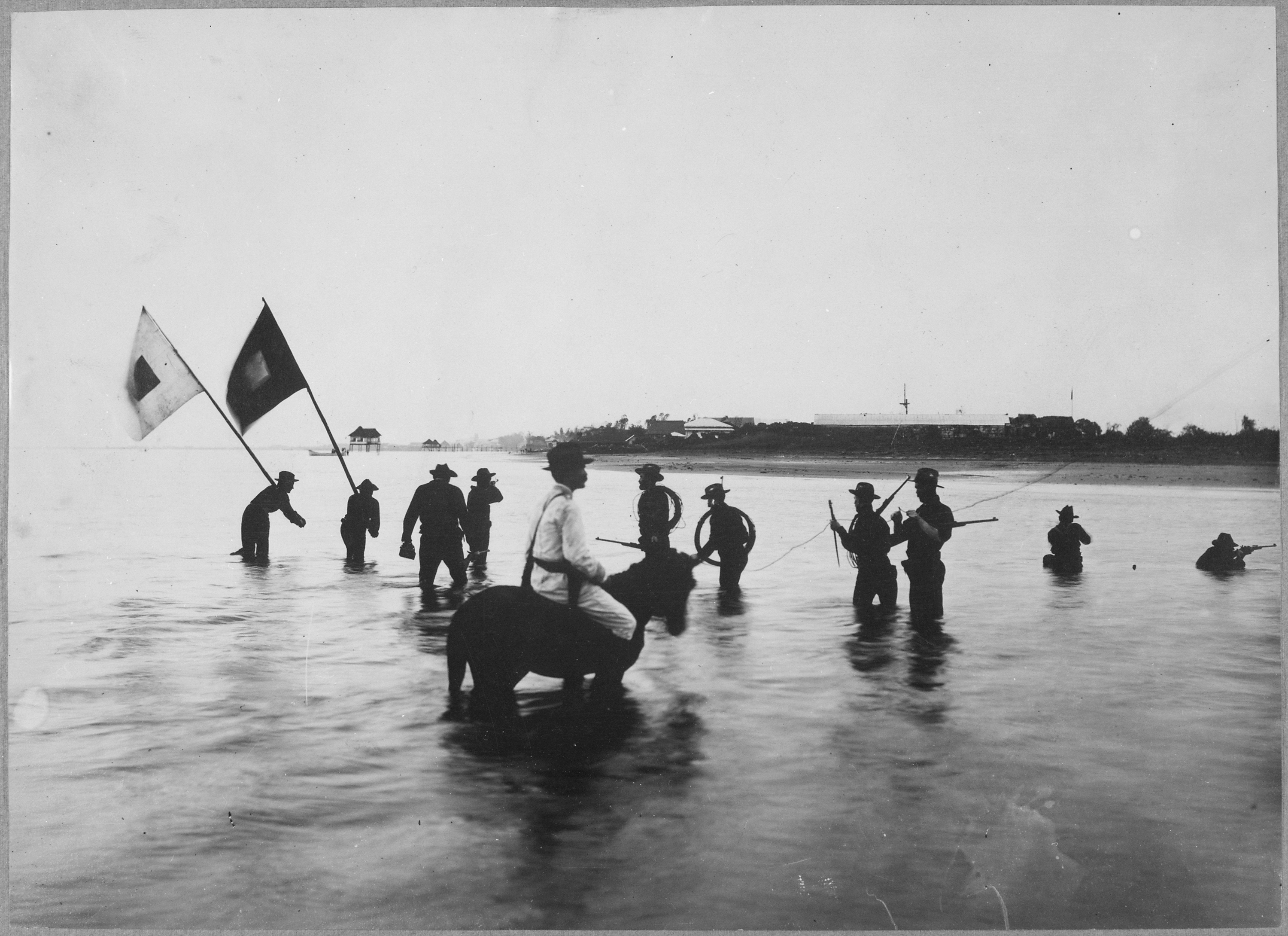
Wigwag flags being carried by the Signal Corps while extending a telegraph line at Manila during the Spanish–American War in 1898

The Civil War was the high point of the use of wigwag, but there were some other campaigns that included flag signalmen, mainly against Native Americans. Signal parties accompanied general Patrick E. Connor on the Powder River Expedition of 1865 in Wyoming and Montana. The signalmen were used to maintain communications between troop columns. The campaign was a punitive expedition against the Sioux, Cheyenne, and Arapaho in retaliation for raiding and disrupting travel on the Bozeman Trail. The expedition was a large operation consisting of three separate columns approaching from different directions.

Wigwag was taken up by some European countries, notably the British in African colonial wars. It was used extensively in the Boer War in South Africa. Once Morse code became an international standard, the British dropped the Myer code for wigwag signaling and used Morse instead with the flag movements indicating dots and dashes. The French had a slight variation of that, using a single flag for dot and two flags for dash.

=== Withdrawal ===
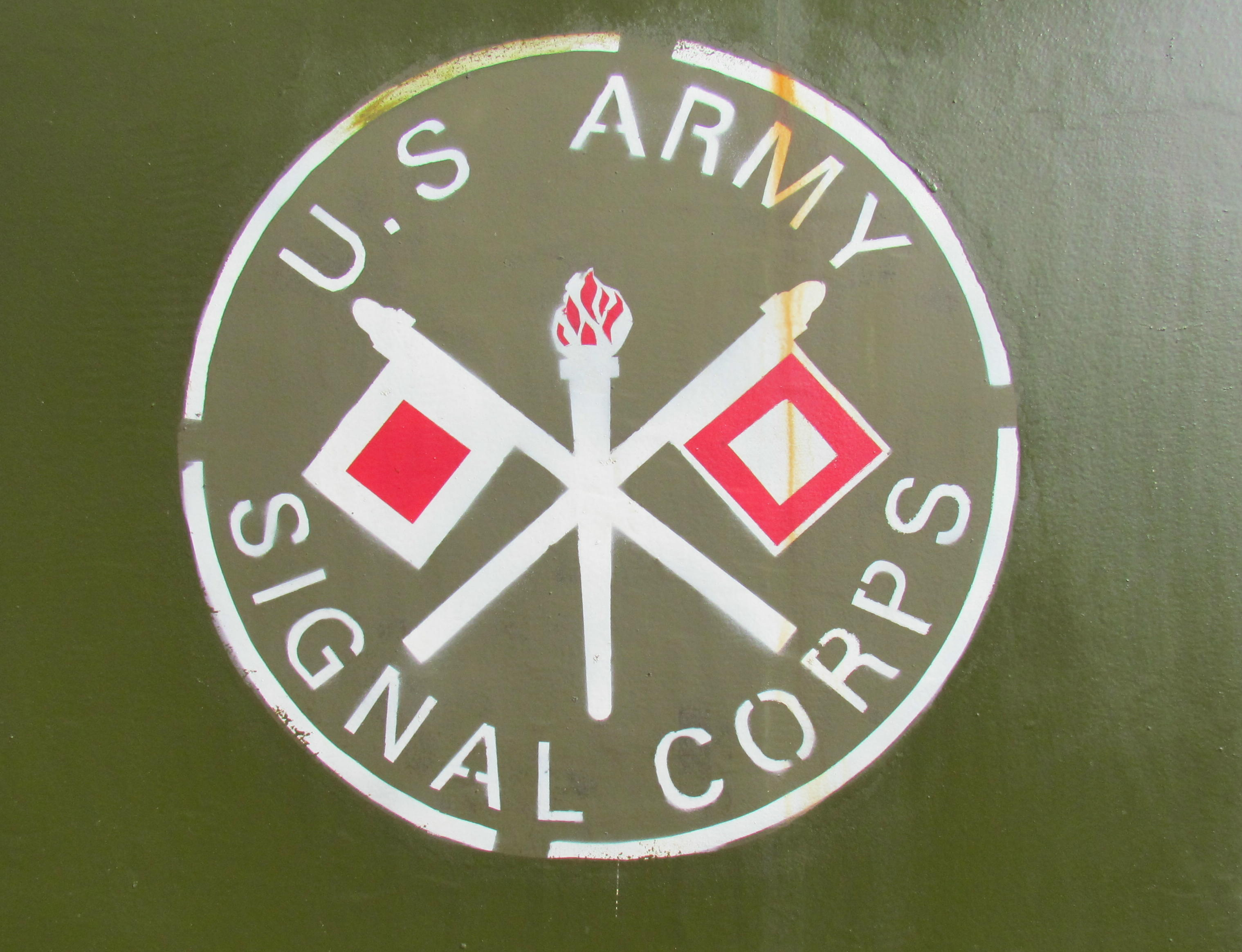
US Army Signal Corp insignia featuring crossed wigwag flags and torch

Even while the Civil War was still in progress, the electrical telegraph was starting to displace flag signaling. This perhaps did not happen as quickly as it might have done because the US Military Telegraph and the Signal Corps were under different leaderships. Myer made repeated attempts to absorb the Military Telegraph but failed due to political rivalries, particularly Myer's rivalry with the civilian head of the Military Telegraph, Anson Stager. This prevented a clear distinction being formed between strategic and tactical communications. Sensibly, the Signal Corps as the tactical wing should have had full access to electrical telegraph technology, but Stager attempted to prevent this.

Nevertheless, Myer was able to institute telegraph trains (that is, trains of wagons, not rail locomotives) that carried a combination of electrical telegraph and flag equipment. The original idea was to use the Morse telegraph in the trains, but due to the unavailability of trained Morse operators to Myer, the contractor, Henry J. Rogers, replaced the Morse key and sounder with a circular alphabet and pointer of his own design that could be operated by any literate person. A further change was the replacement of acid batteries for power with a hand-cranked electrical generator invented by George W. Beardslee.

Although these changes made use in the field easier, they had serious disadvantages. The Rogers alphabet system slowed down the speed of transmission, and the Beardslee generator was only powerful enough for short distances. These problems resulted in occasions when the Signal Corps had to turn over its lines to the Military Telegraph with their superior equipment. After the Battle of Chancellorsville in 1863 where these problems were apparent, Myer tried to recruit Morse operators through advertisements. However, this just resulted in Myer's dismissal for exceeding his authority, and replacement by Nicodemus. The inability of the Signal Corps to fully adopt the electrical telegraph ensured that flag signals remained in widespread use throughout the war.

Myer's code remained in use in the US until 1886 when it was replaced by Morse code for flag signals. It came back into use after 1896, but was officially discontinued in 1912 when International Morse code was mandated for all types of visual signaling. Inconsistently, American Morse code was mandated for Army electrical telegraph lines, but not for radio telegraphy. The wigwag method was superseded by flag semaphore for short distances, and the heliograph for long distances in regions where the electrical telegraph was not available. The heliograph saw widespread use in Arizona and New Mexico after Nelson A. Miles took over command of the campaign against the Apache in 1886. In good conditions, the heliograph could transmit over distances as great as 50 miles. This is far in excess of anything achievable with flag signaling.

== Code details ==
=== Two-symbol code (General Service Code) ===
Flag motions
Symbol	Motion
1	Wave flag to ground on right
2	Wave flag to ground on left
3	Dip flag to ground in front

Letters
A	B	C	D	E	F	G	H	I	J	K	L	M
22	2112	121	222	12	2221	2211	122	1	1122	2121	221	1221
N	O	P	Q	R	S	T	U	V	W	X	Y	Z
11	21	1212	1211	211	212	2	112	1222	1121	2122	111	2222

Common words and syllables
Codepoint	Meaning
1111	&
2212	ing
1112	tion
a	after
b	before
c	can
h	have
n	not
r	are
t	the
u	you
ur	your
w	word
wi	with

Controls
Codepoint	Meaning
3	End of word
33	End of sentence
333	End of message
22.22.22.3	Understood
22.22.22.333	Stop sending
121.121.121	Repeat
212121	Error
211.211.211	Move to the right
221.221.221	Move to the left
Continuous waving	Attention
Two circles to right	End of address
Two circles to left	Start of signature

Numerals could represent a control signal as well as a number. Numbers could alternatively be sent by Roman numerals or the first ten letters of the alphabet.

Numerals
Codepoint	Numeral	Control
21112	1	Wait
12221	2	Are you ready?
22122	3	I am ready
22212	4	Use short pole and small flag
22221	5	Use long pole and large flag
12222	6	Send faster
11222	7	Did you understand?
11112	8	Use white flag
11211	9	Use black flag
22222	0	Use red flag

=== Four-symbol code ===
An alternative representation of the standard wigwag code uses four symbols (plus a fifth one in control characters). This code is identical in execution to the General Service Code. That is, there is no difference in the signals as observed, only in the notation as written. The difference is that this representation makes it explicit that there should be no pause at the ready position within a character. Myer's 1872 manual states that this version of the code was used by the US Army, but is superseded by the General Service Code.

Flag motions
Symbol	Motion
1	Wave flag to ground on left
2	Wave flag to ground on right
3	Wave flag in half circle from right to left
4	Wave flag in half circle from left to right
5	Dip flag to ground in front

Motion "3" starts with the flag on the ground to the right of the signalman, not in the upright starting position. It can therefore only follow motions that end with the flag on the right; that is, "2" or "4". Similarly, "4" starting on the left can only follow "1" or "3". For example, "C" in the General Service Code is coded as "121", which is "left-right-left". In this code it is coded as "234" which is a motion from the ready position to the left ("2"), followed by a motion from the left to the right ("3"), followed by a motion from the right to the left ("4"). Together these make the motions "left-right-left", the same as the General Service Code. Since the end of the character has been reached, a return to the ready position for the next character is implied.

Letters
A	B	C	D	E	F	G	H	I	J	K	L	M
11	1423	234	111	23	1114	1142	231	2	2231	1432	114	2314
N	O	P	Q	R	S	T	U	V	W	X	Y	Z
22	14	2343	2342	142	143	1	223	2311	2234	1431	222	1111

Common words and syllables
Codepoint	Meaning
2222	&
1143	ing
2223	tion

Controls
Codepoint	Meaning
5	End of word
55	End of sentence
555	End of message
11.11.11.5	Understood
11.11.11.555	Stop sending
234.234.234.5	Repeat
143434.5	Error
142.142.142.5	Move to the right
114.114.114.5	Move to the left
Continuous waving	Attention
Two circles to right	End of address
Two circles to left	Start of signature

Numerals
Codepoint	Numeral	Control
14223	1	Wait
23114	2	Are you ready?
11431	3	I am ready
11143	4	Use short pole and small flag
11114	5	Use long pole and large flag
23111	6	Send faster
22311	7	Did you understand?
22223	8	Use white flag
22342	9	Use black flag
11111	0	Use red flag

== Bibliography ==
- Alexander, Edward P., Military Memoirs of a Confederate, Charles Scribner's Sons, April 1907 OCLC 458406698.
- Berkowitz, Bruce D., The New Face of War: How War Will be Fought in the 21st Century, Simon and Schuster, 2003 ISBN 0743212495.
- Chambers, John Whiteclay II, The Oxford Companion to American Military History, Oxford University Press, 1999 ISBN 0195071980.
- Coe, Lewis, The Telegraph: A History of Morse's Invention and Its Predecessors in the United States, McFarland, 2003 ISBN 0786418087.
- Coutant, Charles G., The History of Wyoming from the Earliest Known Discoveries, vol. 1, Chaplin, Spafford & Mathison, 1899 OCLC 40744278.
- Greely, A. W., "The signal service", pp. 305–340 in, Miller, Francis Trevelyan (ed), The Photographic History of the Civil War, vol. 8, The Review of Reviews Co., 1911 OCLC 180558284.
- Hagerman, Edward., The American Civil War and the Origins of Modern Warfare, Indiana University Press, 1992 ISBN 0253207150.
- Heidler, David S.; Heidler, Jeanne T., "Edward Porter Alexander", in, Heidler, David S.; Heidler, Jeanne T. (eds), Encyclopedia of the American Civil War: A Political, Social, and Military History, W. W. Norton & Company, 2000 ISBN 039304758X.
- Holzmann, Gerard J.; Pehrson, Björn, The Early History of Data Networks, Wiley, 1995 ISBN 0818667826.
- McDermott, John Dishon, Circle of Fire: The Indian War of 1865, Stackpole Books, 2003 ISBN 0811700615.
- Miles, Nelson A., Personal Recollections and Observations of General Nelson A. Miles, vol. 2, University of Nebraska Press, 1992 ISBN 0803281811.
- Myer, Albert J., A New Sign Language for Deaf Mutes, Steam Press of Jewett, Thomas & Co., 1851 OCLC 7364112.
- Myer, Albert J., "Improved system of signaling", U.S. patent 31,256, issued 29 January 1861.
- Myer, Albert J., A Manual of Signals, D. Van Nostrand, 1866, OCLC 680380148.
- Myer, Albert J., A Manual of Signals, D. Van Nostrand, 1868, OCLC 228693537.
- Myer, Albert J., A Manual of Signals, D. Van Nostrand, 1872, OCLC 682033474.
- Raines, Rebecca, Getting the Message Through, US Government Printing Office, 1996 ISBN 0160872812.
- Rauch, Steven J., "Confederate Army Signal Corps", pp. 102–103 in, Christopher H. Sterling (ed), Military Communications: From Ancient Times to the 21st Century, ABC-CLIO, 2008 ISBN 1851097325.
- Thompson, George Raynor, "Civil War signals", Signals, vol. 8, no. 4, pp. 12–13, 76, 78, Armed Forces Communications Association, March–April 1954.
- Wagner, Margaret E., The Library of Congress Civil War Desk Reference, Simon and Schuster, 2002 ISBN 0684863502.
- Wolters, Timothy S., Information at Sea, Johns Hopkins University Press, 2013 ISBN 978-1421410265.
- Woods, David L., "Heliograph and mirrors", pp. 208–211 in, Christopher H. Sterling (ed), Military Communications: From Ancient Times to the 21st Century, ABC-CLIO, 2008 ISBN 1851097325.
- Woods, David L.; Sterling, Christopher H., "Flags", pp. 158–160 in, Christopher H. Sterling (ed), Military Communications: From Ancient Times to the 21st Century, ABC-CLIO, 2008 ISBN 1851097325.
