= General Service Code =

General Service Code is a code that was used during the American Civil War. The code uses one flag or two torches.

The flags come in three color schemes: a red square in the middle of a white background, white on black, or black on white. The flag that is used at any time depends on the visibility.

The flags come in three sizes: two feet by two feet, four by four, and six by six. The 2x2 flags are used in battle to send messages back to headquarters and to send back commands, sometimes by more than one signaler. The 4x4 flags are used for almost everything else. The 6x6 flags are for sending messages that can't wait until night so they could use the torches. These flags are so heavy that no one really wanted to use them.

One torch is put on a pole and waved around and is called the action torch. The other was stuck on a stake and called the foot torch. The purpose of the foot torch is to decipher if the message is meant for you or for the guy on the other side of the sender.

The torches run on turpentine. Turpentine is used in the torches because it burns brighter than kerosene. People don't use turpentine in lamps because it is far too volatile to be used in that manner.

The code uses three positions. Position one is to the left. Position two is to the right. Position three is forward. The following is the code and shortcuts.

A 11    B 1221  C 212   D 111   E 21    F 1112  G 1122  H 211   I 2     J 2211
K 1212  L 112   M 2112  N 22    O 12    P 2121  Q 2122  R 122   S 121   T 1
U 221   V 2111  W 2212  X 1211  Y 222   Z 1111

1 12221 2 21112 3 11211 4 11121 5 11112 6 21111 7 22111 8 22221 9 22122 0 11111

& 2222  -tion 2221   -ing 1121  -ed 1222

121212          Error
3               End of word
33              End of sentence
333             End of message
11, 11, 11, 3   Message received or understood
11, 11, 11, 333 Cease signaling

1 Wait a moment.                 2   Are you ready?                3 I am ready.
4 Use short pole and small flag. 5   Use long pole and large flag. 6 Work faster.
7 Did you understand?            8   Use white flag.               9 Use black flag.
0 Use red flag.                  A   After                         B Before
C Can                            Imy Immediately                   N Not
Q Quiet                          R   Are                           U You
Y Why

[[Media:Signal Corps Association 1860 ~ 1861]]

== See also ==
For a slightly different version of the code using four different signals, as documented in 1896, see Signal Corps in the American Civil War – Wig-wag signaling.
