= Thomas S. Bell Jr. =

Union Army lieutenant colonel (1838–1862)

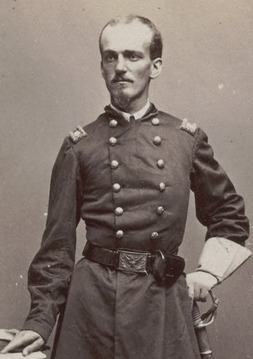
- Bell in 1861
- Born: Thomas Sloan Bell Jr. May 12, 1838; West Chester, Pennsylvania, U.S.
- Died: September 17, 1862 (aged 24); Sharpsburg, Maryland, U.S.
- Burial place: Oaklands Cemetery, West Chester, Pennsylvania, U.S.
- Relatives: Thomas S. Bell (father); William Hemphill Bell (brother)
- Military career
- Allegiance: United States (Union)
- Branch: U.S. Army (Union Army)
- Service years: 1861–1862
- Rank: Lieutenant Colonel
- Units: 9th Pennsylvania Regiment; 51st Pennsylvania Infantry Regiment; 124th Pennsylvania Infantry Regiment
- Conflicts: American Civil War; Battle of Roanoke Island; Battle of New Bern; Battle of South Mills; Second Battle of Bull Run; Battle of South Mountain; Battle of Antietam †

Thomas Sloan Bell Jr. (May 12, 1838 – September 17, 1862) was an American military officer who served as a Union Army lieutenant colonel of the 51st Pennsylvania Infantry Regiment during the American Civil War. He was killed in action at the Battle of Antietam shortly after capturing a key stone bridge over Antietam Creek held by Confederate troops.

== Early life and career ==
Born in West Chester, Pennsylvania, on May 12, 1838, Bell was the third son of Thomas S. Bell and was descended from Colonel Joseph McClellan, who had distinguished himself as an officer during the American Revolutionary War. Among his siblings was US Army officer, William Hemphill Bell. Thomas Bell Jr. studied at West Chester Academy, read law under his father's supervision, and gained admittance to the Chester County bar in April 1859. On May 20, 1859, Governor William F. Packer appointed him notary public for Chester County.

Bell pursued a military career in the Pennsylvania militia in conjunction with his law practice. On March 11, 1858, he was commissioned aide-de-camp to the major general commanding the 3rd Division of the uniformed militia of Chester and Delaware counties. On October 3, 1859, he became paymaster of the same division, with the rank of major.

In October 1860, he ran for the Pennsylvania General Assembly on the Democratic ticket but was not elected.

== Civil War ==
In the spring of 1861, Bell promptly responded to President Abraham Lincoln's call for volunteers to suppress the Southern secessionists. He was elected to serve as a lieutenant in the first company of volunteers that marched from West Chester and served as adjutant of the 9th Pennsylvania Regiment, which consisted of soldiers who had volunteered for three months of service. Bell mustered out with the rest of his regiment in July 1861 and promptly reenlisted. Governor Andrew Gregg Curtin commissioned Bell a lieutenant colonel of the 51st Pennsylvania Infantry Regiment commanded by Colonel John F. Hartranft. On November 18, 1861, the regiment left Camp Curtin and traveled to Annapolis, Maryland, where they drilled for six weeks before embarking for military operations on the coast of North Carolina on January 6, 1862.

Burnside's North Carolina Expedition was a Union naval and infantry assault aimed at closing blockade-running ports inside the Outer Banks. The 51st Pennsylvania joined the expedition as part of the 2nd Brigade, commanded by General Jesse L. Reno. Bell commanded part of the regiment at the Battle of Roanoke Island and commanded the entire regiment at the Battle of New Bern, leading a charge against Confederate batteries, which he captured. Also at New Bern, he commanded a detachment that dragged army's artillery through downpours along muddy roads in time for the Union attack, for which he earned personal thanks from General Ambrose Burnside. At the inconclusive Battle of South Hill, Bell commanded the entire 2nd Brigade. On June 30, Burnside's expedition embarked and sailed for Fort Monroe in Virginia, landing on July 8.

During this period, Bell was nominated for colonel of the newly formed 124th Pennsylvania Infantry Regiment (composed largely of Chester County volunteers). However, the War Department barred officers from swapping positions, so Bell remained with his regiment as a lieutenant colonel.

Back in Virginia after the North Carolina Expedition, Bell's regiment was assigned to the 2nd Brigade of the 2nd Division, commanded by General Edward Ferrero, in the IX Corps under the overall command of General Burnside. As part of the Army of the Potomac, Bell fought at the Second Battle of Bull Run (August 28–30) and the Battle of South Mountain (September 14). He went on to fight in the Battle of Antietam on September 17, 1862. He led his troops as they stormed a tactically important stone bridge across Antietam Creek held by the Confederates. Soon after the Union troops seized the bridge, grapeshot struck Bell in the left temple and inflicted a mortal wound. Carried to a nearby farmhouse that had been converted into a field hospital, he died of his wounds at 5 p.m. The regiment sustained heavy casualties of 125 men killed and wounded during the battle.

Two of Bell's brothers also served in the Union Army. William H. Bell graduated from West Point, and Joseph McClellan Bell served as a colonel in the Army of Virginia and fought at the Second Battle of Bull Run.

== Death and legacy ==
Bell's remains were returned to West Chester and interred in the family plot at Oaklands Cemetery. He was an Episcopalian.

The Chester County History Center holds a collection of Bell's wartime letters and sketches.
