= Samuel T. Cushing =

US Army brigadier general

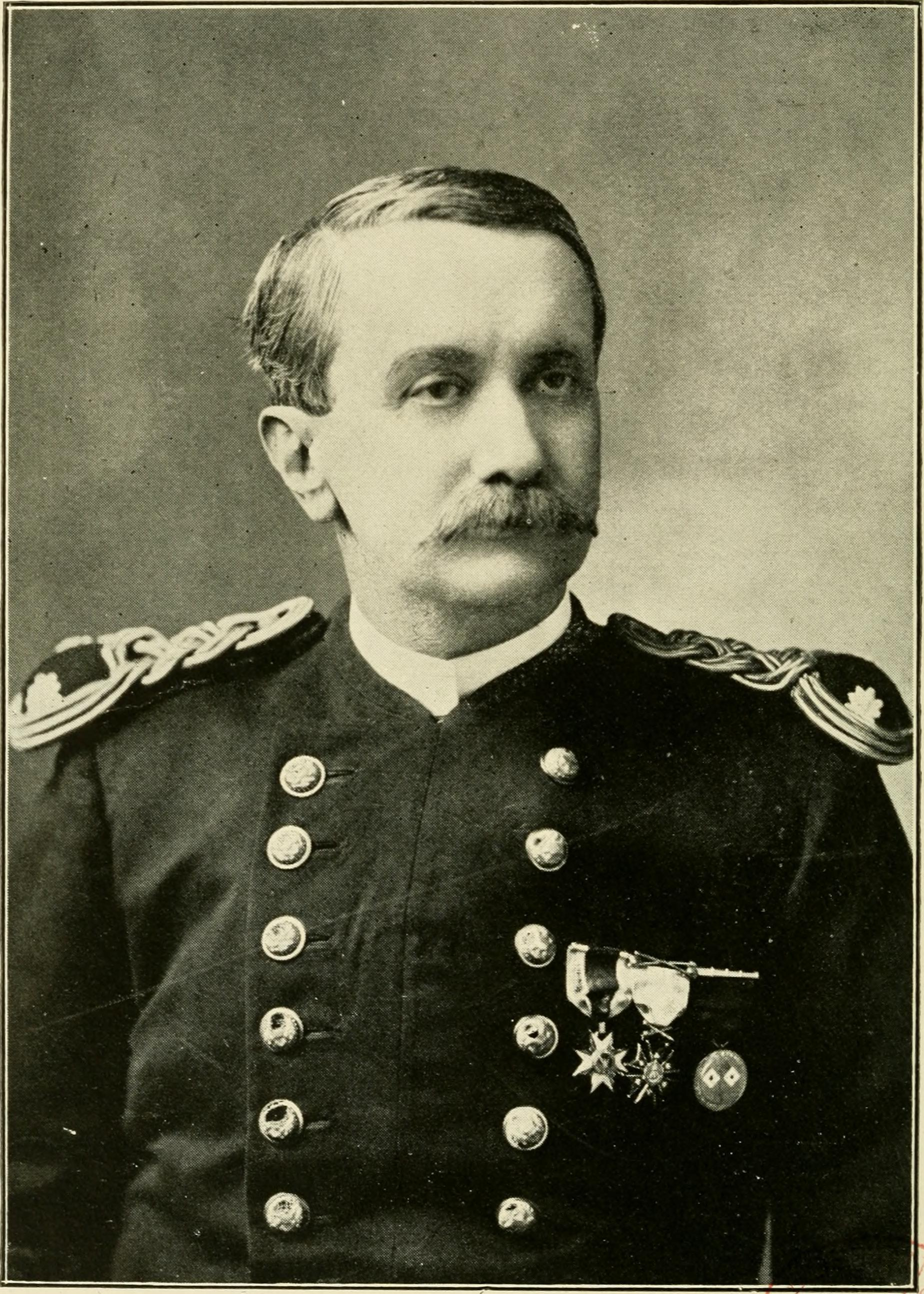
- Cushing as a lieutenant colonel c. 1895
- Born: September 14, 1839; Providence, Rhode Island, US
- Died: July 21, 1901 (aged 61); Washington, D.C., US
- Burial place: Arlington National Cemetery
- Alma mater: United States Military Academy
- Spouse: Katharine Virginia Dewey (m. 1869–1901)
- Children: 2
- Military career
- Allegiance: United States; Union (American Civil War)
- Service: United States Army; Union Army
- Service years: (1860–1861, 1865–1898) (US Army) (1861–1865) (Union Army)
- Rank: Brigadier General
- Units: US Army Infantry Branch; US Army Signal Corps; US Army Subsistence Department
- Commands: Union Army Signal School; Signal Corps Office, Washington, D.C. Chief Signal Officer, Army of the Potomac; Chief Commissary, Department of the Platte; Chief Commissary, Department of the South; Chief Commissary, Department of the Columbia; Chief Commissary, Department of Texas; Chief Commissary, Department of the Missouri; US Army Commissary General of Subsistence
- Wars: American Civil War; American Indian Wars; Spanish–American War

Samuel T. Cushing (14 September 1839 – 21 July 1901) was a career officer in the United States Army. A veteran of the American Civil War, American Indian Wars, and Spanish–American War, he was one of the organizers of the US Army Signal Corps and attained the rank of brigadier general as the army's Commissary General of Subsistence.

A native of Providence, Rhode Island, Cushing was raised and educated in Providence and graduated from the United States Military Academy (West Point) in 1860. After serving in New Mexico Territory during the Navajo Wars in 1860 and 1861, Cushing served with the Union Army throughout the American Civil War. While in New Mexico, he and Albert J. Myer studied and experimented with signaling and communications methods including the telegraph. At the start of the American Civil War, he served as aide-de-camp to Dixon Stansbury Miles, who commanded a brigade during the July 1861 First Battle of Bull Run. He subsequently commanded a school for training soldiers assigned to the Signal Corps and served as the Army of the Potomac's chief signal officer. After teaching Signal officers as a member of the West Point faculty, he transferred to the Commissary department, then served at posts in Tennessee, Kentucky, and Indiana until the end of the war.

During the Reconstruction era, Cushing served in Mississippi, which was followed by commissary duty at forts and camps in Nebraska, Texas, New Mexico, and other locations in the Western United States. He took part in the Bannock War of 1878 and was part of the 1884 disaster relief response that followed flooding in Pennsylvania. In the late 1880s and early 1890s, he performed commissary of subsistence duties in states including Texas and Kansas.

In 1895, Cushing was assigned as the army's assistant commissary general of subsistence as a lieutenant colonel, and he was promoted to colonel in January 1897. In January 1898, he was promoted to brigadier general and appointed as commissary general. The Spanish–American War commenced in early 1898; at age 59, Cushing anticipated serving until reaching the mandatory retirement age of 64 in 1903. However, his declining health caused him to conclude that he could not perform effectively during the army's wartime expansion, so he requested retirement for disability. His request was approved, and he left the army in April 1898.

After retiring, Cushing resided in Washington, D.C. he died in Washington on 21 July 1901. Cushing was buried at Arlington National Cemetery.

== Early life ==
Samuel Tobey Cushing was born in Providence, Rhode Island on 14 September 1839, a son of George W. Cushing and Sarah (Cooke) Cushing. He was raised and educated in Providence, and graduated from Providence High School. In 1855 received an appointment to the United States Military Academy at West Point. He graduated in 1860 ranked 30th of 41 and among his classmates were several officers who attained prominence during the American Civil War and the three decades afterward, including Horace Porter, James H. Wilson, John Moulder Wilson, Stephen Dodson Ramseur, Alexander Cummings McWhorter Pennington Jr., Wesley Merritt, Frank Huger, and James M. Warner.

On 1 July 1860, Cushing was appointed a second lieutenant of Infantry by brevet and assigned to frontier duty in New Mexico Territory. He served at Fort Defiance in 1860 and 1861, including participation in an extended expedition during the Navajo Wars. During part of 1861, he served in Santa Fe, where he and Albert J. Myer studied and experimented with signaling and communications methods including the telegraph and wigwag flags and lanterns. He received his commission as a second lieutenant in the 2nd Infantry Regiment on 19 January 1861. At the outbreak of the American Civil War in the spring of 1861, Cushing served initially with the army garrison that defended New York Harbor. He received promotion to first lieutenant on 14 May 1861.

== Start of career ==
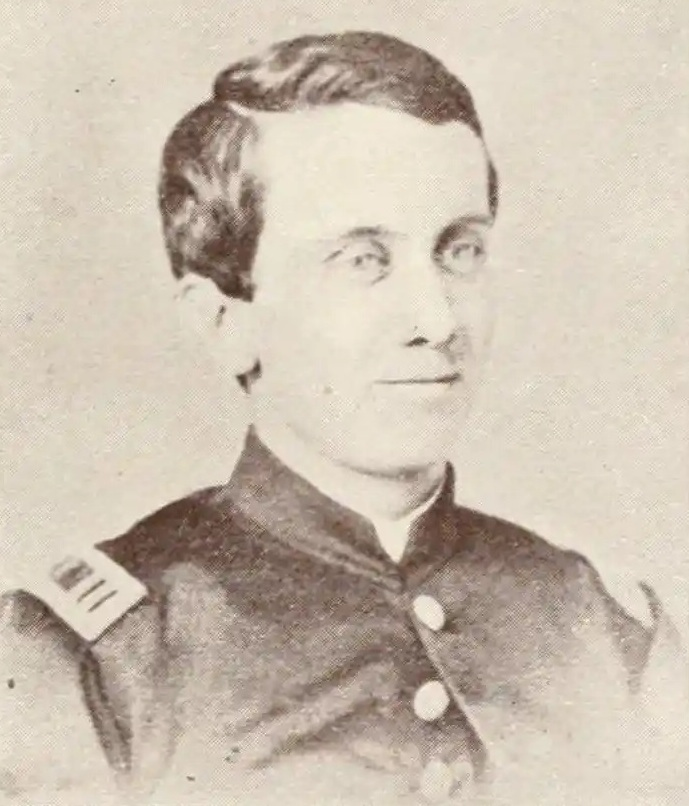
Cushing as a captain during the Civil War

Cushing performed duties with the Union Army throughout the Civil War. He assisted in organizing the Civil War Defenses of Washington in June and July, 1861. He took part in the Bull Run campaign of July, 1861 as aide-de-camp to Dixon Stansbury Miles who commanded a brigade in the force led by Irwin McDowell. Cushing took part in the First Battle of Bull Run on 21 July, after which he served as acting assistant inspector general on McDowell's staff. From September 1861 to March 1862, Cushing organized and commanded the army's first school for the instruction of Signal soldiers, which was conducted in the Red Hill neighborhood of Washington, D.C.'s Georgetown area. He was promoted to captain on 15 February 1862.

From March to October 1862, Cushing was in charge of the Signal Corps office in Washington, D.C. From October 1862 to May 1863, he served as chief signal officer for the Army of the Potomac. In February 1863, he was commissioned as a captain in the army's subsistence department. From May to July 1863, Cushing was assigned as assistant to the Union Army's chief signal officer. He was on duty at West Point from July 1863 to January 1864, where he served as an instructor for Signal Corps officers.

Cushing performed commissary of subsistence duties in Chattanooga, Tennessee from February to March 1864, and in Nashville, Tennessee from March to June 1864. He served in Louisville, Kentucky from June to October 1864, and in Jeffersonville, Indiana from October 1864 to May 1865. He was in Louisville again from May to June 1865, and in Evansville, Indiana from June to August 1865. At the start of the post-war Reconstruction era, he served in Vicksburg, Mississippi from August 1865 to March 1866. He performed commissary duties in Omaha, Nebraska from May to August 1866, including a two-month leave of absence because of illness. Cushing received brevet promotion to major on 13 March 1865 to recognize his meritorious wartime service. From August 1866 to March 1868, Cushing served as chief commissary for the Department of the Platte. He performed commissary of subsistence duties for the District of Texas, the Fifth Military District, and the Department of Texas from March 1868 to October 1873.

=== Family ===
On 27 March 1869, Cushing married Katharine "Kate" Virginia Dewey. They were the parents of son Samuel Dewey Cushing, daughter Sarah Knox Cushing, and son Louis Cushing, who died at 18 months old.

== Continued career ==
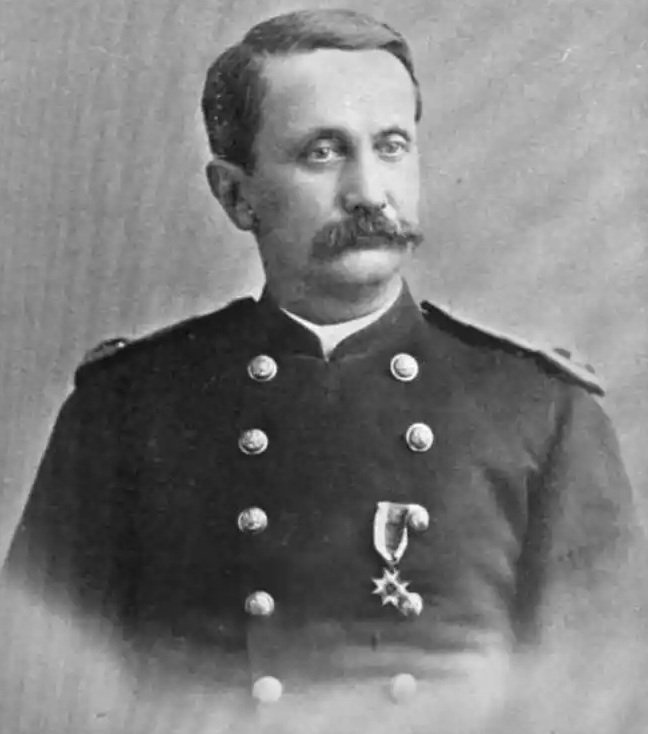
Cushing later in his career

Cushing served as commissary officer for the District of New Mexico from October 1873 to November 1874, and depot commissary officer in Louisville, Kentucky from November 1874 to August 1875. He was assigned as chief commissary for the Department of the South from August 1875 to February 1877, and as purchasing commissary in San Francisco from February 1877 to November 1880, which included service in Idaho as commissary officer during the Bannock War of 1878. From November 1880 to May 1883, he served as chief commissary for the Department of the Columbia and purchasing commissary for Vancouver Barracks, Washington. Cushing served as assistant to the army's commissary general from May 1883 to May 26, 1884, including overseeing the distribution of emergency food aid in February and March 1884 after flooding in Pennsylvania.

From May 1884 to August 1889, Cushing was assigned as chief commissary for the Department of Texas and purchasing and depot commissary in San Antonio. He served as chief commissary for the Department of the Missouri and purchasing and depot commissary at Fort Leavenworth, Kansas from August 1889 to May 1893. From June 1893 to April 1894, Cushing was assigned as chief commissary for the Department of the Platte and depot and purchasing officer in Omaha, Nebraska. In May 1894, he was assigned as assistant commissary general. He was promoted to lieutenant colonel in November 1895 and colonel in January 1897.

In January 1898, Cushing was promoted to brigadier general and assigned as the army's Commissary General of Subsistence, succeeding William Hemphill Bell. He intended to serve until reaching the mandatory retirement age of 64 in 1903, but when the army expanded for the Spanish–American War in the spring of 1898, he concluded that declining health would prevent him from effectively managing the commissary general's department. He requested retirement for disability, which was approved in April 1898.

In retirement, Cushing was a resident of Washington, D.C. and was a member of the Grand Army of the Republic and the Military Order of the Loyal Legion of the United States. He died in Washington on 21 July 1901. Cushing's funeral was held at the Church of St. Paul's and he was buried at Arlington National Cemetery.

== Dates of rank ==
Cushing's dates of rank were:

- Second Lieutenant (Brevet), 1 July 1860
- Second Lieutenant (Infantry), 19 January 1861
- First Lieutenant (Infantry), 14 May 1861
- Captain (Infantry), 15 February 1862
- Captain (Commissary), 9 February 1863
- Major (Brevet), 13 March 1868
- Major (Commissary), 28 August 1888
- Lieutenant Colonel (Commissary), 11 November 1895
- Colonel (Commissary), 26 January 1897
- Brigadier General (Commissary), 28 January 1898
- Brigadier General (Retired), 21 April 1898
