= California flood of 1605 =

Flood in North America

The California flood of 1605 was a massive flood that submerged large portions of present-day California. The megaflood was a result of sustained major rain storms across the region, enhanced by an unusually powerful atmospheric river. The flooding greatly affected the indigenous peoples of California.

In addition to this event, geologic evidence indicates that other "megafloods" occurred in the California region in the following years A.D.: 212, 440, 603, 1029, c. 1300, 1418, 1750, 1810, and 1861–1862. United States Geological Survey sediment research revealed that the 1605 flood deposited a layer of silt two inches thick at the Santa Barbara basin, indicating that it was the worst flood event of the past 2,000 years, being at least 50% more powerful than any of the others recorded based on geological evidence. The United States Geological Survey has developed a hypothetical scenario, known as the "ARkStorm", that describes the effects of a similar event in modern-day California.

In 1861–1862, another atmospheric river event resulted in the Great Flood of 1862, which submerged most of Central Valley and parts of Southern California, and caused the state capital to be temporarily moved from the flooded Sacramento to San Francisco, with other adjacent western states also flooded.

== See also ==
- Great Flood of 1862
- ARkStorm
- Atmospheric river
  - Pineapple Express
- Extreme weather
- Lists of floods in the United States
