= William Hemphill Bell =

US Army brigadier general

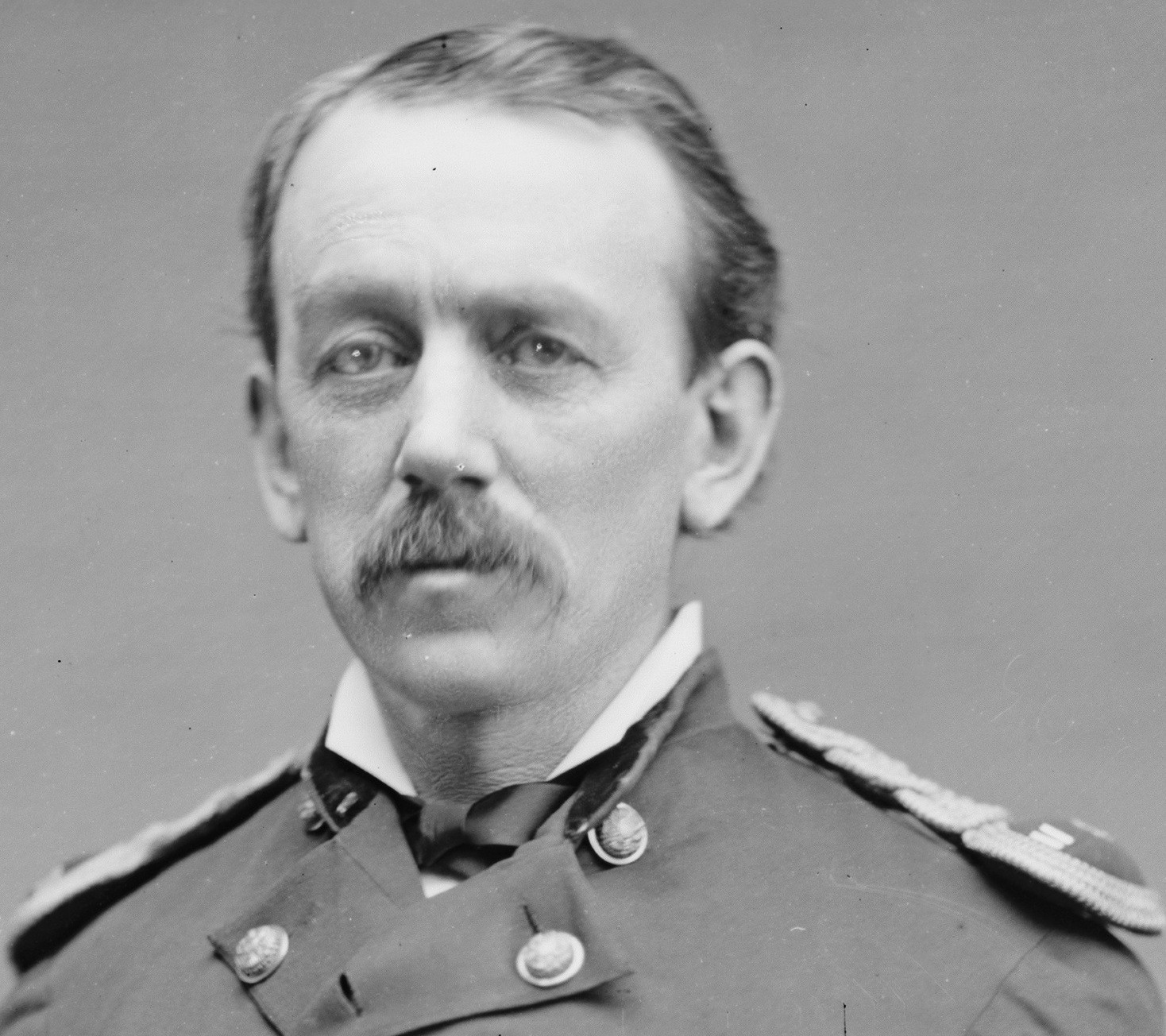
- Brady–Handy photo of Bell as a captain, c. 1875
- Born: January 28, 1834; West Chester, Pennsylvania, US
- Died: October 17, 1906 (aged 72); Denver, Colorado, US
- Burial place: Fort Leavenworth National Cemetery
- Alma mater: United States Military Academy
- Spouse: Mary Rebecca Edgar (m. 1860; death 1902)
- Children: 4
- Relatives: Thomas S. Bell (father); Thomas S. Bell Jr. (brother)
- Military career
- Allegiance: United States; Union (American Civil War)
- Service: United States Army; Union Army
- Service years: 1858–1861, 1866–1898 (US Army); 1861–1866 (Union Army)
- Rank: Brigadier General
- Unit: U.S. Army Subsistence Department
- Commands: Subsistence Depot, Aquia Creek; Subsistence Depot, Falmouth Depot; Subsistence Depot, Belle Plains; Chief Commissary, Department of New Mexico; Chief Commissary, District of New Mexico; Chief Commissary, Department of Alaska; Chief Commissary, Department of the South; Chief Commissary, Department of the Platte; Chief Commissary, Department of California; Chief Commissary, Department of Colorado; Commissary General of the U.S. Army
- Wars: American Civil War; American Indian Wars

William H. Bell (28 January 1834 – 17 October 1906) was a career officer in the United States Army. A veteran of the American Civil War and the American Indian Wars, he served from 1858 to 1897 and attained the rank of brigadier general as the army's commissary general of subsistence.

Bell was born and raised in West Chester, Pennsylvania, and attended the United States Military Academy at West Point from 1853 to 1858. Commissioned as a second lieutenant of Infantry, he served in New Mexico Territory, which included explorations of territory controlled by the Navajo people. He served in the Union Army during the American Civil War, and his duties included participation in the First Battle of Bull Run, faculty member at West Point, and commissary of subsistence at posts in Virginia, Pennsylvania, and New Mexico.

After the Civil War, Bell continued to perform commissary duties in Washington, D.C., California, Alaska, Washington state, Colorado, and Wyoming. In late 1897 Bell was promoted to brigadier general. In January 1897, he reached the mandatory retirement age of 64 and left the army. In retirement, Bell was a resident of Arvada, Colorado. He died in Denver on 17 October 1906 and was buried at Fort Leavenworth National Cemetery.

== Early life ==
William Hemphill Bell was born in West Chester, Pennsylvania on 28 January 1834, a son of Judge Thomas S. Bell and Keziah Ann (Hemphill) Bell. Among his siblings was army officer Thomas S. Bell Jr. He was raised and educated in West Chester, and in 1853 he received an appointment to the United States Military Academy (West Point). He graduated in 1858 ranked 21st of 27. Among his classmates who attained prominence during the American Civil War and the last three decades of the 19th century were Marcus P. Miller, Royal T. Frank, Asa B. Carey, Bryan M. Thomas, and Oliver Paul Gooding.

At graduation, Bell received an appointment as second lieutenant by brevet. His first assignments were in New Mexico Territory, where he escorted working parties that constructed roads, escorted recruits to their first duty stations, and escorting working parties that surveyed Fort Craig, Cantonment Burgwin. He received his commission as a second lieutenant of Infantry on 6 December 1858. Assigned to the 3rd Infantry Regiment, he served at Fort Union and Fort Marcy in 1860, including participating in an exploratory expedition of territory controlled by the Navajo. He served at Fort Clark, Texas in 1860 and 1861. Bell then joined the garrison at Fort Hamilton that defended New York Harbor. He was promoted to first lieutenant in May 1861.

=== Family ===
In May 1860, Bell married Mary Rebecca Edgar. They were married until her death in 1902, and were the parents of sons Joseph Edgar Bell, Thomas Sloan Bell, Edgar Collins Bell, and William Hemphill Bell Jr.

== Start of career ==
Bell served in the Union Army throughout the American Civil War. In May and June 1861, he served in northern Virginia, and he participated in the Bull Run campaign of July 1861, including the First Battle of Bull Run. He performed provost marshal duty in Washington, D.C. in July and August 1861, after which he joined the faculty at West Point as principal assistant professor of drawing. In June 1862 he was assigned to commissary duty and established a subsistence depot at Point Lookout, Maryland. He received promotion to captain on, June 11, 1862.

In August and September 1862, Bell was in charge of the subsistence depots at Aquia Creek and Falmouth Depot in Virginia. In August, he took part in planning and executing the burning of a bridge at Fredericksburg, Virginia that Union forces had constructed across the Rappahannock River, and which Union troops destroyed so they could not be pursued as the evacuated the city. He oversaw establishment of a subsistence depot at Hagerstown Depot, Maryland in September and October 1862, and inspected the depot at Manassas Junction, Virginia in November 1862. Bell was in charge of the subsistence depot at Belle Plains, Virginia in November and December 1862. From January to June 1863 he was assigned as disbursing officer in Harrisburg, Pennsylvania. He was then posted to New Mexico, where he served as commissary of subsistence in Santa Fe from June 1863 to June 1864. From June 1864 to July 1865, Bell was chief commissary for the army's Department of New Mexico. Bell received promotion to major by brevet on 13 March 1865 in recognition of the meritorious service he rendered in New Mexico.

== Continued career ==
Bell continued his army career after the war, and served as chief commissary for the District of New Mexico from July 1865 to April 1867. From July 1867 to May 1868, he was assigned as depot and post commissary at Fort Harker, Kansas. He served on the staff of the army's commissary general in Washington, D.C. from May to September 1868. He was then assigned as chief commissary for the Department of Alaska, where he served from February 1869 to July 1870. Bell was in Alaska awaiting orders until October 1870, then was assigned to settle commissary accounts for the Department of the Columbia. After the accounts were balanced, Bell performed commissary of subsistence duties for the department from November 1874 to December 1878.

Bell performed temporary duty in the office of the commissary general from December 1878 to February 1879. He was purchasing commissary and depot commissary in New Orleans from February to June 1879, then served again in the office of the commissary general from June 1879 to December 1880, including temporary duty in Baltimore from November to December 1879. He was chief commissary for the Department of the South from December 1880 to November 1881. Bell served as purchasing commissary and depot commissary in Cincinnati from December 1881 to December 1884. He was promoted to major in August 1883.

== Later career ==
From December 1884 to March 1886, Bell served as purchasing commissary and depot commissary in Cheyenne, Wyoming, which included temporary duty conducting disaster relief from February to June 1884 after flooding on the Ohio River. He served as purchasing commissary in Denver from October 1885 to September 1889. He was then assigned as chief commissary for the Department of the Platte and purchasing and depot commissary in Omaha, Nebraska, where he remained until June 1892. Bell was then assigned to Denver as purchasing commissary, where he served until March 1894. In December 1892, he received promotion to lieutenant colonel. From March 1894 to June 1896, Bell was assigned as chief commissary for the Department of California. He was promoted to colonel on 10 June 1896, and served as chief commissary for the Department of Colorado from July 1896 to March 1897.

From March to November 1897, Bell was assigned as principal assistant to the army's commissary general. In November 1897, he was assigned as the army's commissary general and promoted to brigadier general. He served until January 1898, when he reached the mandatory retirement age of 64 and was succeeded by Samuel T. Cushing. After retiring, Bell built a home in Arvada, Colorado. He died in Denver on 17 October 1906. Bell was buried at Fort Leavenworth National Cemetery.

== Works by ==
- The Quiddities Of An Alaskan Trip. Portland, Oregon: C. A. Steel & Co. 1873 – via Google Books.
- Ante Bellum; Or, Before the War. Cincinnati: Peter G. Thompson. 5 September 1883 – via HathiTrust.

== Dates of rank ==
Bell's dates of rank were:

- Second Lieutenant (Brevet), 1 July 1858
- Second Lieutenant, 6 December 1858
- First Lieutenant, 14 May 1861
- Captain, 11 June 1862
- Major (Brevet), 13 March 1865
- Major, 14 August 1883
- Lieutenant Colonel, 27 December 1892
- Brigadier General, 14 November 1897
- Brigadier General (Retired), 28 January 1898
