= Megastorm =

Megastorm may refer to:

== Hypothetical storms ==
- ARkStorm, a proposed 1-in-1,000 year atmospheric river event that could impact California with historic, extremely damaging flooding
- Hypercane, hypothetical extreme tropical cyclones that could reach the size of continents and last for several weeks on average. Hypercanes also would have maximum sustained winds reaching at least 500 miles per hour (800 km/h), and a minimum central pressure of 700 millibars (21 inHg) or lower.

== Other uses ==
- Megastorm, a Predacon/Destron in the Transformers fictional universe

== See also ==
- Superstorm, a large, unusually-occurring, destructive storm without another distinct meteorological classification
