= Atmospheric lake =

An atmospheric lake is a long-lived moisture-rich pool of slow moving water vapor. Currently, such pools are only known to exist over the western equatorial Indian Ocean (WEIO). Atmospheric lakes are formed when streams of water vapor separate from the South Asian monsoons to become isolated objects. These objects last for days at a time, slowly meandering to the coasts. They move slowly as they exist in regions that lack strong winds. Atmospheric lakes can occur several times during the year.

Atmospheric lakes move water from one area and to other areas that are dry and semi-arid. Atmospheric lakes that occur away from the equator sometimes become tropical cyclones.

== See also ==
- Atmospheric river
- North Indian Ocean tropical cyclone
