= William E. Hall =

United States Navy Medal of Honor recipient

William Edward Hall
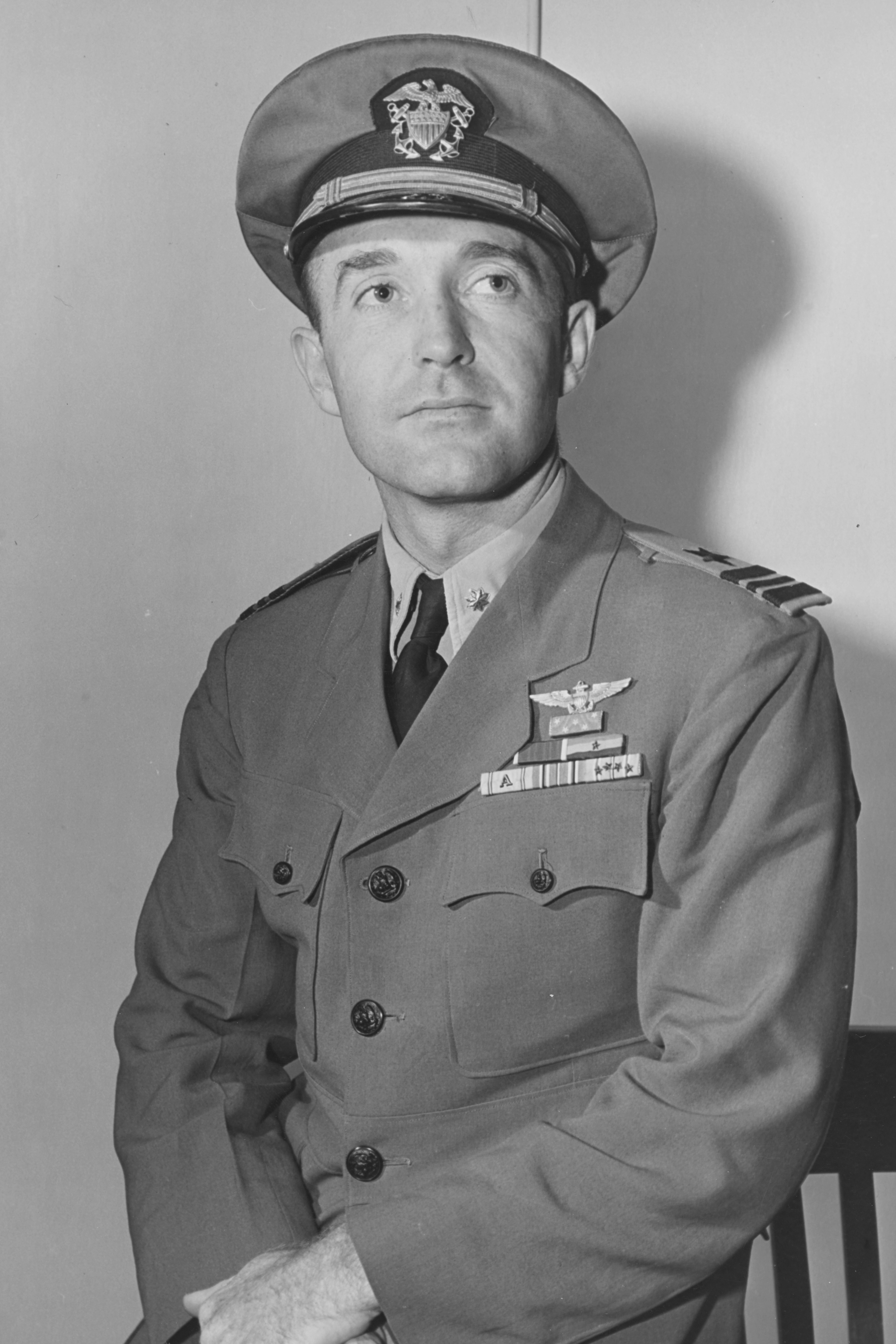
- Born: October 31, 1913; Storrs, Utah, US
- Died: November 15, 1996 (aged 83); Kansas City, Missouri, US
- Burial place: Fort Leavenworth National Cemetery, Fort Leavenworth, Kansas
- Military career
- Allegiance: United States of America
- Branch: United States Navy
- Service years: 1938–1946
- Rank: Lieutenant Commander
- Conflicts: World War II; *Battle of the Coral Sea
- Awards: Medal of Honor; Purple Heart

William Edward Hall (October 31, 1913 – November 15, 1996) was a United States Naval Reserve officer and a recipient of the United States military's highest decoration—the Medal of Honor—for his actions during the Battle of the Coral Sea in World War II.

== Biography ==
Hall graduated from the University of Redlands and then joined the Navy from his birth state of Utah in May 1938. He completed flight training as a naval aviator in September 1939 and by May 7, 1942 was a Lieutenant, Junior Grade, serving as a scout plane pilot with Lexington's Scouting Squadron 2 (flying the SBD Dauntless). On that day, over the Coral Sea, Hall participated in the attack on the Japanese carrier Shoho, gaining a share in its destruction. The next day, while flying anti-torpedo plane patrol in defense of his carrier, he attacked a section of Japanese torpedo bombers, setting afire the lead plane (commanded by Lieutenant Norio Yano) and forcing the wingmen to switch targets. Before he could find another target (Yano was finished by AA shortly afterwards), Hall found himself jumped by several Zeros. Although his craft was damaged and he was seriously wounded in the ensuing dogfight, he claimed two shot down (though none were lost) and managed to land safely. For these actions, he was awarded the Medal of Honor.

While in the hospital he met his wife, a navy nurse, and they married in September 1942. Hall reached the rank of lieutenant commander before leaving the Navy in 1946. He died at age 83 and was buried in Fort Leavenworth National Cemetery, Fort Leavenworth, Kansas.

== Medal of Honor Citation ==
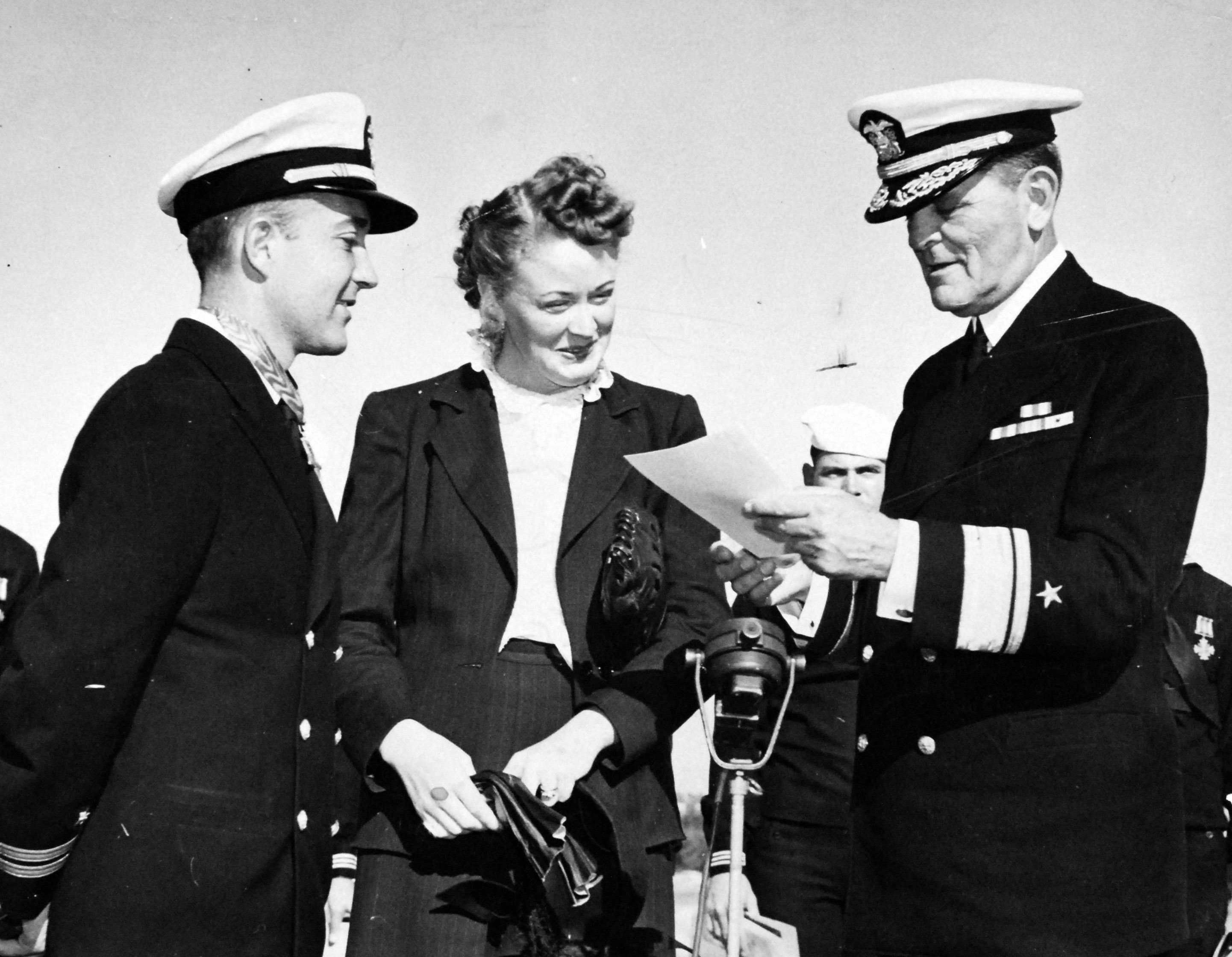
Hall (left) and his wife during his Medal of Honor presentation by Rear Adm. Ralston S. Holmes

Hall's official Medal of Honor citation reads:

For extreme courage and conspicuous heroism in combat above and beyond the call of duty as pilot of a scouting plane in action against enemy Japanese forces in the Coral Sea on 7 and 8 May 1942. In a resolute and determined attack on 7 May, Lt. (j.g.) Hall dived his plane at an enemy Japanese aircraft carrier, contributing materially to the destruction of that vessel. On 8 May, facing heavy and fierce fighter opposition, he again displayed extraordinary skill as an airman and the aggressive spirit of a fighter in repeated and effectively executed counterattacks against a superior number of enemy planes in which 3 enemy aircraft were destroyed. Though seriously wounded in this engagement, Lt. (j.g.) Hall, maintaining the fearless and indomitable tactics pursued throughout these actions, succeeded in landing his plane safe.

== Awards and decorations ==

Badge	Naval Aviator Badge		
1st row	Medal of Honor		
2nd row	Purple Heart	Navy Presidential Unit Citation with service star	American Defense Service Medal with "A" Device
3rd row	American Campaign Medal	Asiatic-Pacific Campaign Medal with three campaign stars	World War II Victory Medal

== See also ==
- List of Medal of Honor recipients
