= Thomas S. Bell =

American judge and politician from Pennsylvania (1800–1861)

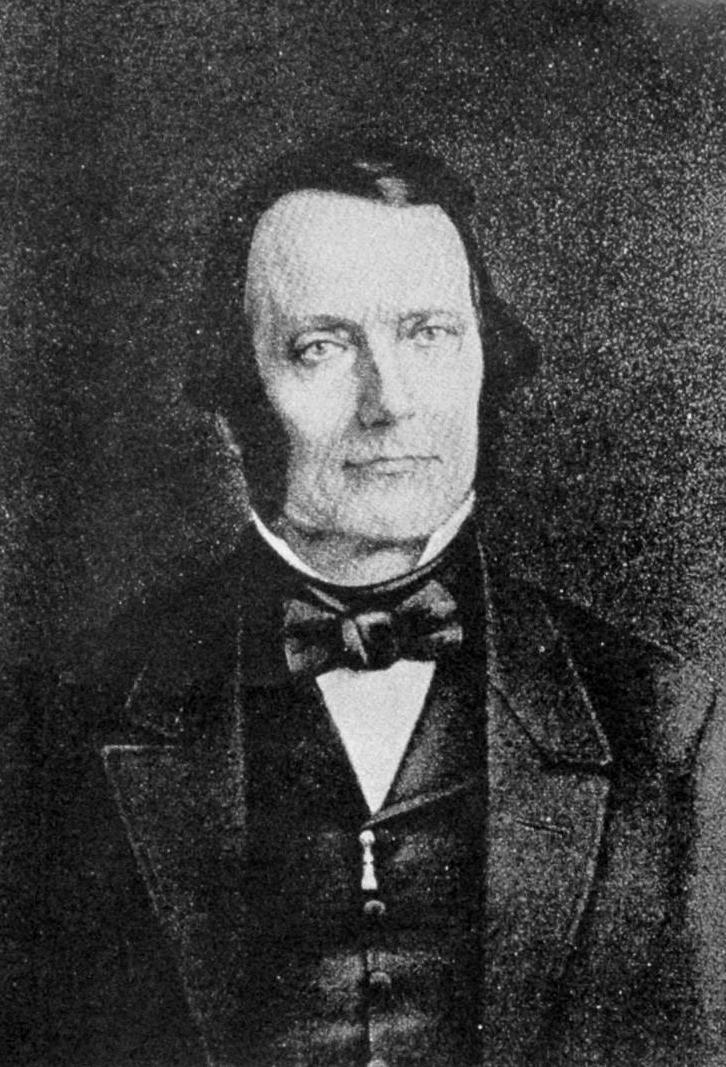
- Bell, c. 1850

Member of the Pennsylvania Senate from the 2nd district
- In office 1858–1860
- Preceded by: Henry S. Evans
- Succeeded by: Wilmer Worthington
- In office 1838–1839
- Preceded by: Francis James
- Succeeded by: Nathaniel Brooke

Personal details
- Born: Thomas Sloan Bell; October 22, 1800 Philadelphia, Pennsylvania, U.S.
- Died: June 6, 1861 (aged 60) Philadelphia, Pennsylvania, U.S.
- Resting place: Oaklands Cemetery, West Goshen Township, Pennsylvania, U.S.
- Spouse(s): Caroline Darlington (died 1829) Keziah Ann Hemphill (m. 1830)
- Relations: Isaac Darlington (father-in-law)
- Children: 6, including Thomas S. Jr. and William H.
- Occupation: Judge; politician; lawyer

Thomas Sloan Bell Sr. (October 22, 1800 – June 6, 1861) was an American judge, politician, and lawyer. A member of the Democratic Party from West Chester, Bell served as a justice of the Supreme Court of Pennsylvania from 1846 to 1851 and as a Pennsylvania State Senator from 1838 to 1839 and 1858 to 1860. He was the father of Union Army Colonel Thomas S. Bell Jr.

== Early life and career ==
Bell was born in Philadelphia on October 22, 1800, to Jane (née Sloan) and William Bell. He read law under James Madison Porter and gained admittance to the Philadelphia bar in 1821. In May of that year, he moved to West Chester where he began to practice law. He was deputy attorney general of Chester County from 1823 to 1828 and served as a member of the board of visitors of the United States Military Academy in 1829, where he chaired a committee that reported on the state of the academy. In 1838, he served as a delegate representing Chester and Montgomery counties at the Pennsylvania Constitutional Convention.

== Political and judicial career ==
Bell won election as a Democrat to the Pennsylvania Senate and served from 1838 to 1839. His seat was contested in the Buckshot War, and he was compelled to step down in favor of his Whig opponent, Nathaniel Brooke, in early 1839.

Governor David R. Porter, a Democrat, promptly named Bell as president judge of the 15th district court covering Chester and Delaware counties. Bell served in this office from May 16, 1839 through November 18, 1846, when Governor Francis R. Shunk appointed him to the bench of the Supreme Court of Pennsylvania, replacing his late father-in-law, Isaac Darlington. Bell lost his Supreme Court reelection campaign and left office on December 1, 1851. Governor James Pollock appointed him to serve as president judge of the 22nd judicial district covering Wayne, Pike, Carbon, and Monroe counties from March to December 1855.

From 1858 to 1860, Bell served as a state senator representing the 2nd Senate District (Chester and Delaware counties).

== Personal life ==
Bell married Caroline Darlington, daughter of Isaac Darlington. She died tragically in childbirth on May 12, 1829, at the age of 25. Their infant son, Isaac D. Bell, also died.

In 1830, Bell remarried to Keziah Ann Hemphill, granddaughter of Revolutionary War Colonel Joseph McClellan. The couple had three sons and two daughters: Ann Rosalie Bell, Caroline Darlington Bell, William Hemphill Bell, Joseph McClellan Bell, and Thomas Sloan Bell Jr. Their daughter, Caroline, married gynecologist William Goodell in September 1857 and settled in Philadelphia after Goodell returned from residency in Istanbul. Two of their sons became soldiers. Thomas Hemphill Bell was a career U.S. Army officer and West Point graduate who served in Alaska. Thomas S. Bell Jr. was a Union Army colonel who was killed in action at the Battle of Antietam in 1862.

Bell died while visiting Caroline Goodell's home in Philadelphia on June 6, 1861. Bell's remains were interred at Oaklands Cemetery in West Goshen Township, Pennsylvania, where his youngest son, Thomas S. Jr., would be buried alongside him a year later. Bell's second wife, Keziah, had predeceased him in 1859.

Bell was a Presbyterian who served as trustee and member of the building committee of the First Presbyterian Church of West Chester during the 1830s.
