= Harry Bell (Medal of Honor) =

- Born: September 21, 1860; Milwaukee, Wisconsin
- Died: November 10, 1938 (aged 78); Cook County, Illinois
- Burial place: Fort Leavenworth National Cemetery
- Military career
- Allegiance: United States
- Branch: United States Army
- Rank: Captain
- Unit: 36th U.S. Volunteer Infantry
- Conflicts: Spanish–American War; Philippine–American War
- Awards: Medal of Honor

Harry Bell (September 21, 1860 – November 10, 1938) was a United States Army Captain received the Medal of Honor for actions during October 17, 1899, during the Philippine–American War for leading a charge against a superior number of the enemy.

== Biography ==
Harry Bell was born in Milwaukee, Wisconsin to Adam Bell and Katherina Matilda (Boettinger) Bell.

In 1899 he was living in Minneapolis, Minnesota when joined the 36th United States Volunteer Infantry and was promoted to the rank of captain. The regiment was posted to the Philippines the same year.

On October 17, 1899 he engaged in the action at Porac on the island of Luzon, for which he later received the Medal of Honor.

After leaving the Army, he married Kate Reimers on 3 August 1904 in Davenport, Iowa and they had 3 sons.

As of 1910 he worked at Fort Leavenworth, Kansas where he was a signals electrician and, as of 1920, he was the chief clerk of the military prison there. In 1911, he published a translation of military correspondence from the Franco-German War by Helmuth von Moltke. By 1930 he had separated from his wife and was working as a government clerk in Columbus, Ohio.

He was living in Proviso Township, Cook County, Illinois where he died in 1938 at the age of 78.

Bell is buried in the Fort Leavenworth National Cemetery.

== Medal of Honor citation ==
Rank and Organization: Captain, 36th Infantry, U.S. Volunteers. Place and Date: Near Porac, Luzon, Philippine Islands, October 17, 1899. Entered Service At: Minneapolis, Minn. Born: September 21, 1860, Milwaukee, Wis. Date of Issue: March 8, 1902.

Citation:

Led a successful charge against a superior force, capturing and dispersing the enemy and relieving other members of his regiment from a perilous position.

== See also ==
- List of Medal of Honor recipients
- List of Philippine-American War Medal of Honor recipients
