= Charles DeRudio =

United States Army officer and aristocrat

Charles Camillo DeRudio
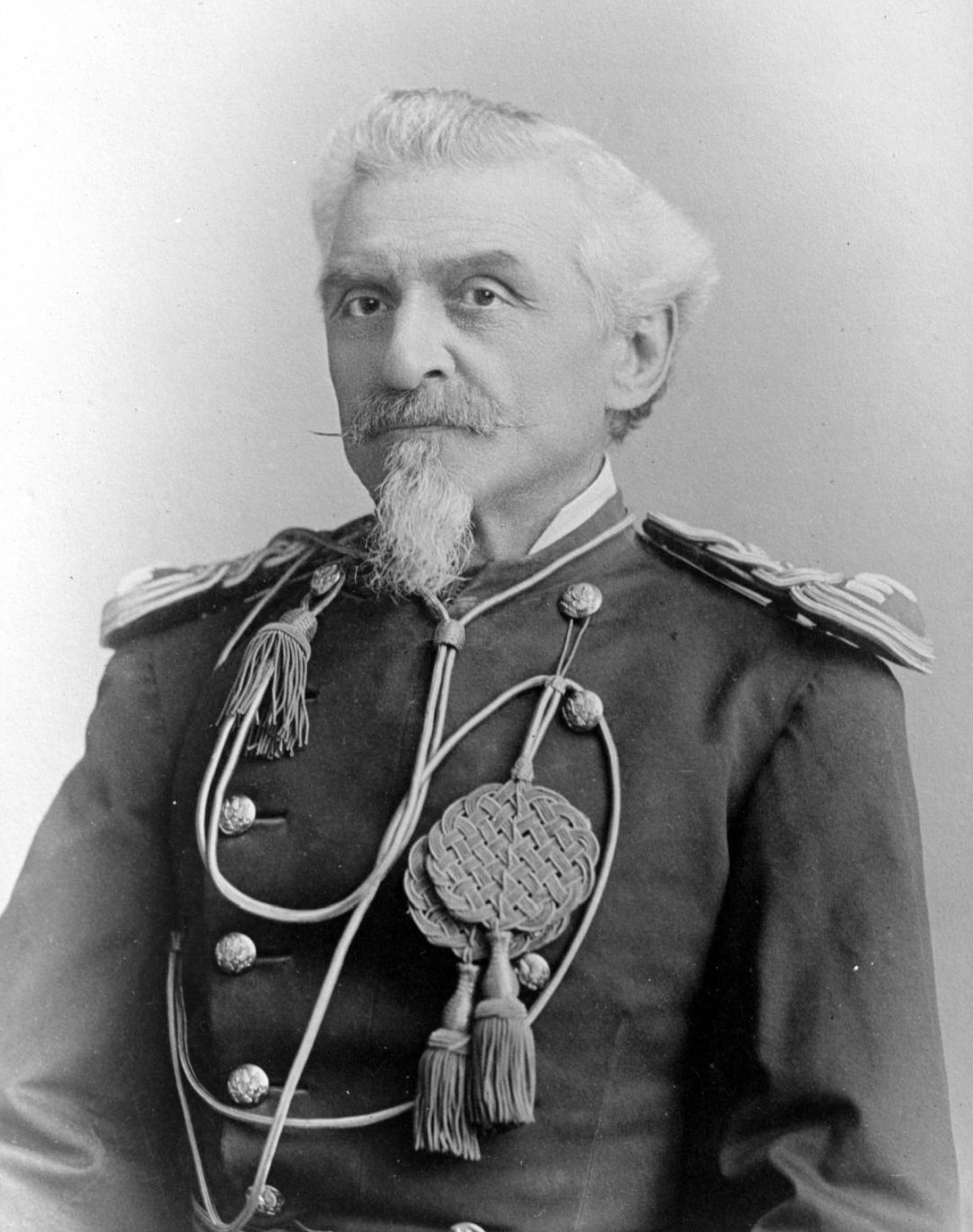
- Charles C. DeRudio
- Born: Carlo Camillo Di Rudio; August 26, 1832; Belluno, Kingdom of Lombardy–Venetia
- Died: November 1, 1910 (aged 78); Pasadena, California, US
- Burial place: San Francisco National Cemetery
- Military career
- Allegiance: Italian Revolution; United States of America
- Branch: United States Army
- Service years: 1864–1866; 1867–1896
- Rank: Major
- Unit: 7th U.S. Cavalry Regiment
- Conflicts: First Italian War of Independence; American Civil War; Indian Wars: Battle of Little Big Horn; Nez Perce War

Charles Camillo DeRudio (born Carlo Camillo Di Rudio; August 26, 1832 – November 1, 1910) was an Italian aristocrat, would-be assassin of Napoleon III, and later a career U.S. Army officer who fought in the 7th U.S. Cavalry Regiment at the Battle of the Little Bighorn.

== Early life ==
Carlo di Rudio was born in Belluno, Italy. He was the son of Count and Countess Aquila di Rudio. (Shortly before his death, he was interviewed by Walter Mason Camp, and showed him family records going back to 1680.) As a teenager, he attended an Austrian military academy in Milan, today known as Military School "Teulié". At the age of 15, di Rudio left to join the Italian patriots during the uprising in 1848, and participated in the defense of Rome, and, later of Venice, against the Austrians. He was shipwrecked off Spain in an aborted attempt to sail to America. He arrived in England from France as a student in 1853, and by 1855 he was living in the East End of London and had married Eliza, the 15-year-old daughter of a confectioner. They eventually had three daughters and two sons. In England he worked as a ‘Teacher of Languages’.

== French imprisonment ==
On January 14, 1858, during a visit to the Salle Le Peletier of the Paris Opera, three bombs were thrown at the royal procession of Emperor Napoleon III. Eight people and a horse were killed and one hundred and fifty injured. Four men were arrested: Felice Orsini, the leader of the plot, Giuseppi Pieri, Antonio Gomez, and a Portuguese beer salesman named "Da Selva," who turned out to be di Rudio. (See Orsini affair for details). Orsini and Pieri were guillotined on March 14 and Gomez was sentenced to life imprisonment on Devil's Island. Di Rudio was initially condemned with Orsini and Pieri, but someone pleaded clemency for him and the sentence was commuted to life on Devil's Island. Several months later, he and twelve others escaped from the prison and made their way to British Guiana. From there, di Rudio made his way back to London and his wife and went on the lecture circuit. His name was anglicized as 'Charles DeRudio'.

== American Civil War ==
DeRudio immigrated to New York City in 1860. He became a private in the 79th New York Infantry Regiment, serving about two months with them at the Siege of Petersburg, Virginia, between August 25 and October 17, 1864. On November 11, 1864, he was commissioned second lieutenant, 2nd U. S. Colored Infantry Regiment. DeRudio served with the 2nd U.S.C.T. in Florida until honorably mustered out of service on January 5, 1866.

== Regular Army service ==
After his Civil War service, DeRudio requested appointment to the Regular Army and received his commission as 2nd lieutenant in the 2nd Infantry Regiment on August 3, 1867. Three weeks later, he failed a physical and his appointment was canceled. (Also, the U.S. War Department discovered his previous 'political activity'.) But about a month later, he was back in uniform, where he remained until he became unassigned on April 17, 1869, as a result of the reduction of the size of the Army from 45 to 25 infantry regiments.

=== 7th Cavalry ===
DeRudio received appointment to the 7th Cavalry Regiment on July 14, 1869, as a 37-year-old 2nd lieutenant. Initially, he was assigned to Company H, commanded by Captain Frederick Benteen. Benteen nicknamed DeRudio "Count No Account" because of his boastful story-telling and haughty manner. DeRudio's reputation among the more senior officers of the 7th, particularly those in the circle of Lt. Col. George A. Custer, was constantly disparaged.

Still, DeRudio apparently was a good officer, as historian Charles K. Mills wrote: "He was not a chronic drinker or gambler. He did not absent himself from his duty station for trivial reasons. He did not shirk duty assignments and, above all else, he patently knew what he was doing at the head of the column of enlisted men." DeRudio, now 43 years old, was promoted by seniority to first lieutenant on December 15, 1875, when promotions in other companies created an opening in Company E.

Since DeRudio was in actuality commanding Company E (its nominal commander, Capt. Charles S. Ilsley, was permanent aide-de-camp to General John Pope at Fort Leavenworth), he should have retained command when it took the field. However, Custer gave command of E company to a favorite of his, 1st Lt. Algernon Smith of Company A, and moved DeRudio to Company A as his replacement. Company A's commander, Captain Myles Moylan, apparently did not get along with DeRudio, who acted as Benteen's adjutant during the campaign. The changes doomed Smith to an early death and spared DeRudio's life.

=== Battle of the Little Bighorn ===
On June 25, 1876, DeRudio was with Company A and crossed the Little Bighorn River as part of Major Marcus Reno's battalion. His company dismounted and fought in skirmish line against the Hunkpapa and Oglala warriors who rushed to defend their village from Reno's attack. Under pressure from growing numbers of warriors, Reno ordered a retreat back across the river, where DeRudio lost his horse and was left behind in the timber on the western bank. For thirty-six hours, DeRudio and Private Thomas O'Neill remained hidden, alternating hope and despair while witnessing the mutilation of dead soldiers by enraged Lakota women. Although the two soldiers had a couple of dangerous confrontations with the Indians, they were able to conceal themselves again and in the early hours of June 27 were finally able to cross the river, joining the Reno and Benteen command on Reno Hill.

DeRudio's story was first published in the New York Herald on July 30, 1876, and reprinted in the Chicago Times on August 2, 1876, with the headline, "A Thrilling Tale - Romance of the Battle of the Little Big Horn; DeRudio's Perilous Adventures - Graphic Details from the Pen of the Lieutenant - Alone in the Burning Woods." DeRudio later claimed he had not written the story, but had given information to Major James ('Grasshopper Jim') Brisbin of the 2nd Cavalry, who had elaborated his story and published it without DeRudio's consent.

Years later, in an interview with Walter Mason Camp, DeRudio claimed that he had had the only saber at the Little Bighorn. (Perhaps unknown to him, 1st Lieutenant Edward Gustave Mathey with the pack train had kept his also, using it to kill snakes. And at least two Indians had sabers, having obtained them at the Battle of the Rosebud.) He showed Camp a golden saber that had been a gift given to him by Company G in 1870. He had been scolded by Custer for accepting the present, and, perhaps as a matter of spite, had not surrendered his issued saber when the others had been packed up at the Powder River Depot.

== Later service ==
DeRudio commanded a re-constituted Company E during the Nez Perce War of 1877, assigned to reinforce Lt. Gustavus Doane's detachment of the 2nd Cavalry patrolling the mountains after the Battle of Big Hole. On January 29–31, 1879, he testified before the Reno Court of Inquiry. DeRudio continued service with the 7th Cavalry, was promoted to captain on December 17, 1882, while stationed at Fort Meade, Dakota Territory. He later served at Fort Sam Houston, Texas, and at Fort Bayard, New Mexico.

He retired on August 26, 1896, having reached the mandatory retirement age of 64, at San Diego, California. On April 23, 1904, he was promoted to the rank of major on the retired list, in recognition of his service in the Union Army during the Civil War.

DeRudio was a Companion of the California Commandery of the Military Order of the Loyal Legion of the United States.

Charles DeRudio died in 1910 in Pasadena, California, of bronchial catarrh and acute enteritis. His remains were cremated and interred in San Francisco National Cemetery.
