= Algernon Smith =

American army officer

Algernon Emory Smith
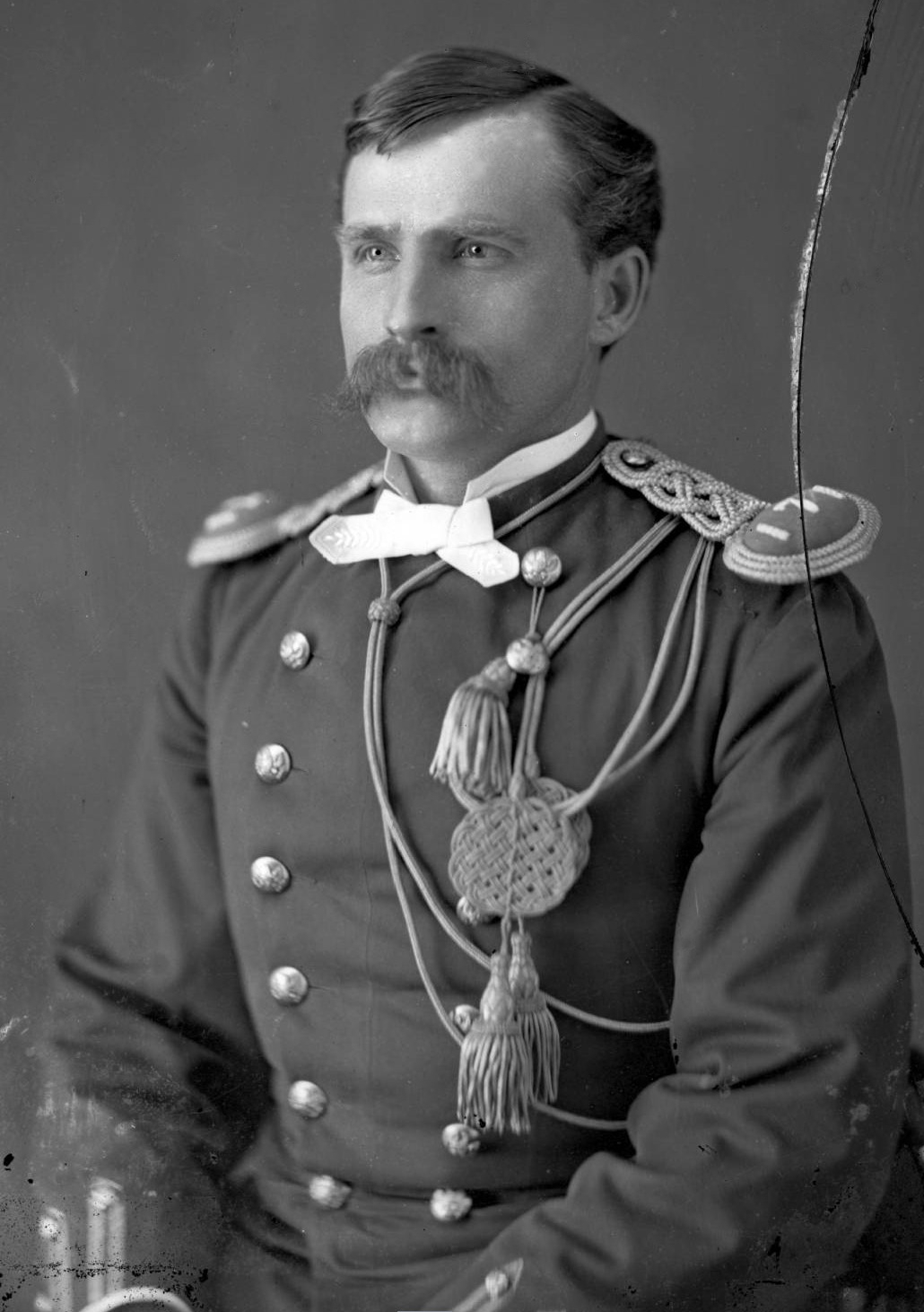
- Algernon Smith
- Born: September 17, 1842; New York, US
- Died: June 25, 1876 (aged 33); Montana Territory
- Burial place: Fort Leavenworth National Cemetery
- Military career
- Allegiance: United States
- Branch: United States Army; Union Army
- Service years: 1862–1876
- Rank: 1st Lieutenant
- Unit: 7th U.S. Cavalry
- Conflicts: American Civil War: Fort Fisher; Indian Wars: Battle of Washita River; Battle of Little Bighorn †

Algernon Emory Smith (September 17, 1842 – June 25, 1876) was an officer in the U.S. 7th Cavalry Regiment who was killed in the Battle of the Little Bighorn in the Montana Territory.

Smith was born in the state of New York, where he attended Hamilton College. In June 1862, during the American Civil War, he enlisted in Company K, 7th U.S. Infantry Regiment. He became a lieutenant in the 117th New York Volunteer Infantry until October 1863 when he was assigned to Maj. Gen. Alfred Terry as an aide-de-camp. He was severely wounded at Fort Fisher in January 1865. He was later breveted to major for his actions in the war.

After the war, in 1867, Smith joined the 7th U.S. Cavalry under George Armstrong Custer. He soon became friends with Custer, and was part of the so-called "Custer Clan" or "Custer Gang" of close-knit friends and relatives of the general. Custer called him "Fresh" Smith, the opposite of "Salty" Smith. He married Nettie B. Bowen on October 10, 1867, at her home in Newport, New York.

Smith served in the 1868 Washita Campaign, seeing his first action against the Native Americans. He was promoted to 1st lieutenant on December 5, 1868. He participated in most of the 7th Cavalry's campaigns, including the 1873 Yellowstone campaign and as assistant quartermaster in the 1874 Black Hills expedition. Although the 1st lieutenant of Company A, Smith was named as assigned to command Company E. This was under the effective command of First Lieutenant Charles DeRudio; as its nominal commander, Captain Charles S. Ilsley, was permanent aide-de-camp to General John Pope at Fort Leavenworth. These changes were to result in Smith being killed at the Battle of the Little Bighorn and DeRudio surviving.

Smith's body was not found among his men, but instead was discovered with Custer in the small knot of dead troops on "Last Stand Hill." Smith was given a hasty burial on the battlefield. He was re-interred in 1877 in the Fort Leavenworth National Cemetery in Fort Leavenworth, Kansas.

His widow died in 1903.
