= 51st Pennsylvania Infantry Regiment =

Union Army infantry regiment

51st Pennsylvania Volunteer Infantry
- Active: November 16, 1861 – July 27, 1865
- Country: United States of America
- Allegiance: Union
- Branch: Infantry
- Engagements: Battle of Roanoke Island; Battle of New Bern; Second Battle of Bull Run; Battle of Chantilly; Battle of South Mountain; Battle of Antietam; Battle of Fredericksburg; Siege of Vicksburg; Jackson Expedition; Knoxville Campaign; Rapidan Campaign; Battle of the Wilderness; Battle of Spotsylvania Court House; Battle of North Anna; Battle of Totopotomoy Creek; Battle of Cold Harbor; Siege of Petersburg; Battle of the Crater; Battle of Globe Tavern; Battle of Peebles' Farm; Battle of Boydton Plank Road; Battle of Fort Stedman; Appomattox Campaign; Third Battle of Petersburg

The 51st Pennsylvania Volunteer Infantry was an infantry regiment that served in the Union Army during the American Civil War.

== Service ==
The 51st Pennsylvania Infantry was organized in Harrisburg, Pennsylvania, and mustered in November 16, 1861 for a three-year enlistment under the command of Colonel John F. Hartranft.

The regiment was attached to Reno's Brigade, Burnside's North Carolina Expeditionary Corps, to April 1862. 2nd Brigade, 2nd Division, Department of North Carolina, to July 1862. 2nd Brigade, 2nd Division, IX Corps, Army of the Potomac, to April 1863. Army of the Ohio to June 1863. Army of the Tennessee to August 1863, and Army of the Ohio to April 1864. 1st Brigade, 3rd Division, IX Corps, Army of the Potomac, to September 1864. 1st Brigade, 1st Division, IX Corps, to July 1865.

The 51st Pennsylvania Infantry mustered out July 27, 1865.

== Detailed service ==
This regiment was recruited during the summer and fall of 1861 by Col. Hartranft for three years' service, most of the officers and men having served for the three months' term. Cos. A, C, D, F and I were recruited in Montgomery county; E, H and K in Union and Snyder; G in Centre and B in Northampton. The place of rendezvous was Camp Curtin, Harrisburg, and the regimental organization was completed on November 16, 1861.

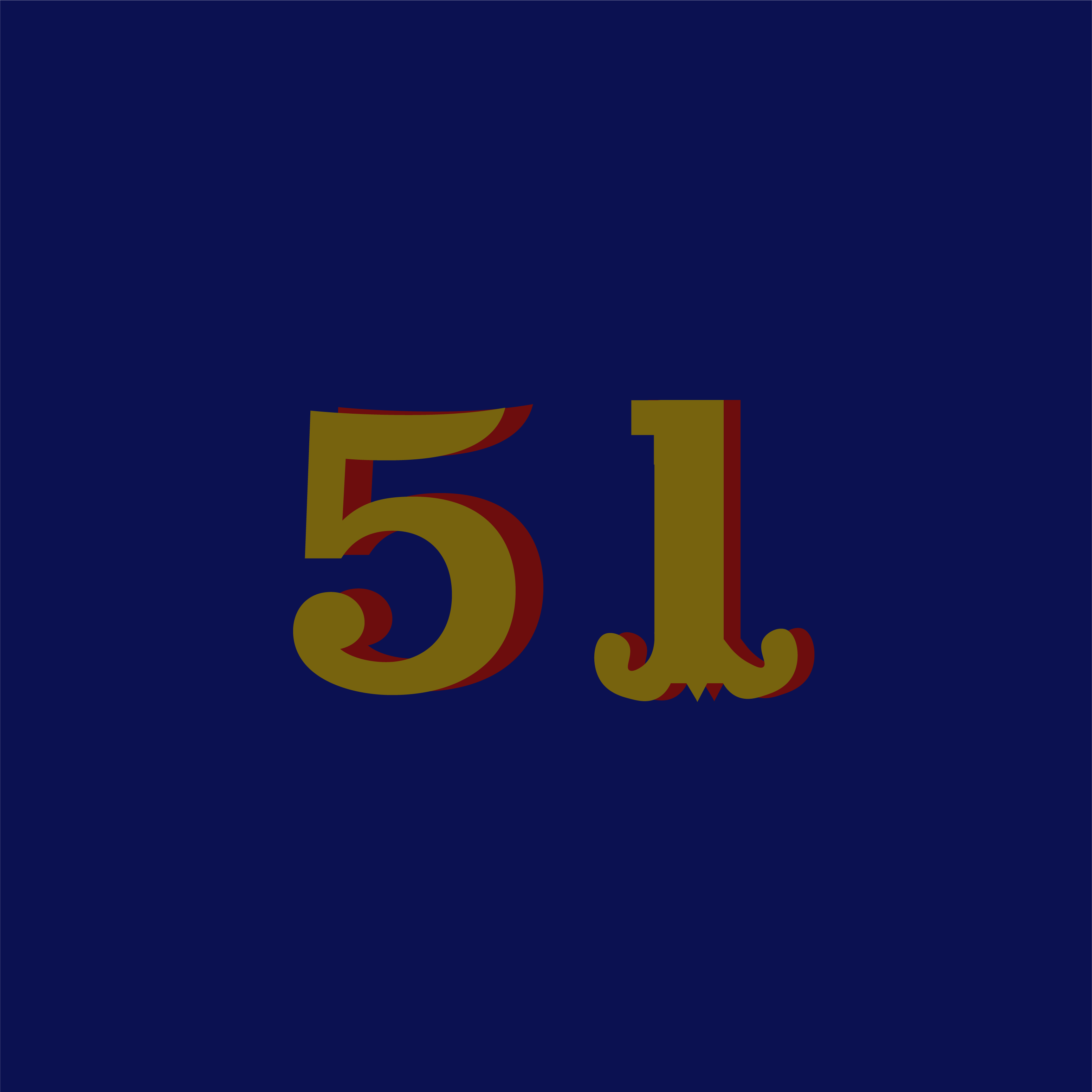
Digital remake of one of two Guide flags used by the regiment. They are now in the state capitol.

Two days later it left for Annapolis, Md., where it remained, perfecting itself in drill and discipline, until January 6, 1862, when it was assigned to the 2nd brigade (Gen. Reno), Burnside's corps, embarked as a part of Burnside's expedition to North Carolina, and landed at Roanoke island on February 7. It shared in the capture of the enemy's works here on the 8th and was active at the Battle of New Bern, N.C., in March, where it executed a gallant charge. It was again active in the battle of Camden, losing 3 killed and 21 wounded.

It returned to Fortress Monroe in July and was assigned to the 2nd brigade, 2nd division, 9th corps, Gen. Ferrero commanding the brigade. It was active at the second Bull Run and Chantilly, and, in September 1862, moved with the 9th corps on the Maryland campaign. It skirmished with the enemy's cavalry at Frederick, Maryland, was engaged at South Mountain and again at Antietam, where it lost 125 men, including Lieut. Col. Thomas S. Bell Jr. and Lieuts. Beaver and Hunsicker; Capts. Bolton and Hart, Adjt. Shorkly, Quartermaster Freedly and Lieut. Lynch wounded. Maj. Schall was then promoted to lieutenant-colonel, and Capt. Bolton to major.

The command suffered severely in the fierce fighting at Fredericksburg in December, its losses being 12 killed and 74 wounded. It was ordered to Fortress Monroe in March 1863, brigaded with the 51st N. Y., 21st Mass., and 11th N. H., and moved thence, with two divisions of the 9th corps, to Kentucky, being posted successively at Winchester, Lancaster, Crab Orchard and Stanford. In June, it moved with its corps under command of Gen. Parke to the support of Grant at Vicksburg, arriving on the 14th and going into camp at Mill Dale. It was employed here and at Oak ridge for several weeks in building fortifications, and joined Sherman in his campaign to Jackson in July.

The command then returned to Kentucky, encamping at Camp Nelson, where it rested and refitted after its arduous service in Mississippi. The regiment moved from Camp Nelson to Crab Orchard, where a number of recruits were received, and thence to Knoxville, Tenn. It was active at the battle of Campbell's station, and suffered all the hardships endured by Burnside's army, when besieged in Knoxville by the enemy under Longstreet. After the siege was raised it joined in the pursuit of the enemy, skirmishing with his rear-guard at Rutledge, and later went into winter quarters at Blaine's cross-roads, where the men suffered much from the meager supplies of food and clothing received.

On January 5, 1864, the regiment reenlisted for a term of three years and returned to Pennsylvania for a 30-day veteran furlough. While in Pennsylvania, the command was rapidly recruited to the maximum strength, as it was a very popular organization, and on the expiration of its furlough it proceeded to Annapolis, where it was assigned to the 1st brigade, 1st division, 9th corps, Col. Hartranft commanding the brigade and Lieut.-Col. Schall the regiment.

The 51st participated in all the sanguinary engagements leading up to the siege of Petersburg, losing heavily. Dating from the battle at the Ny river, May 12, Col. Hartranft was promoted to brigadier-general, Lieut.-Col. Schall became colonel, Maj. Bolton lieutenant-colonel, and Capt. Hart major. In the fierce fighting at Cold Harbor Col. Schall was killed while leading a charge and was succeeded in command by Lieut.-Col. Bolton. The command arrived in front of Petersburg on the 17th and at once engaged the enemy. It was in action again the next day, capturing and holding a position close to the enemy's works. This position was so exposed that a constant fire was kept up, night and day, for more than two weeks, one-third of the men being constantly employed to hold the position. It formed part of the assaulting column at the explosion of the mine, but was ordered back before it entered the crater. In this advance, Col. Bolton was severely wounded and Maj. Hart succeeded to the command.

The regiment remained on duty in front of the crater for a few days, when it was relieved, and remained encamped in the rear until Aug. 19. It shared in the movement for the capture of the Weldon railroad, and participated in all the subsequent operations of the brigade, including the engagements at Poplar Spring Church, Ream's station, Hatcher's run, and the final assault on Petersburg, April 2, 1865. It was mustered out at Alexandria, Va., July 27, 1865, after four years of most trying service.

== Casualties ==
The regiment lost a total of 314 men during service; 12 officers and 165 enlisted men killed or mortally wounded, 137 enlisted men died of disease.

== Commanders ==
- Colonel John F. Hartranft - promoted to brigadier general June 8, 1864
- Colonel William Jordan Bolton

== See also ==
- List of Pennsylvania Civil War Units
- Pennsylvania in the Civil War
