= Australian Northwest Cloudband =

Band of continuous cloud that stretches from the east Indian Ocean to southern Australia

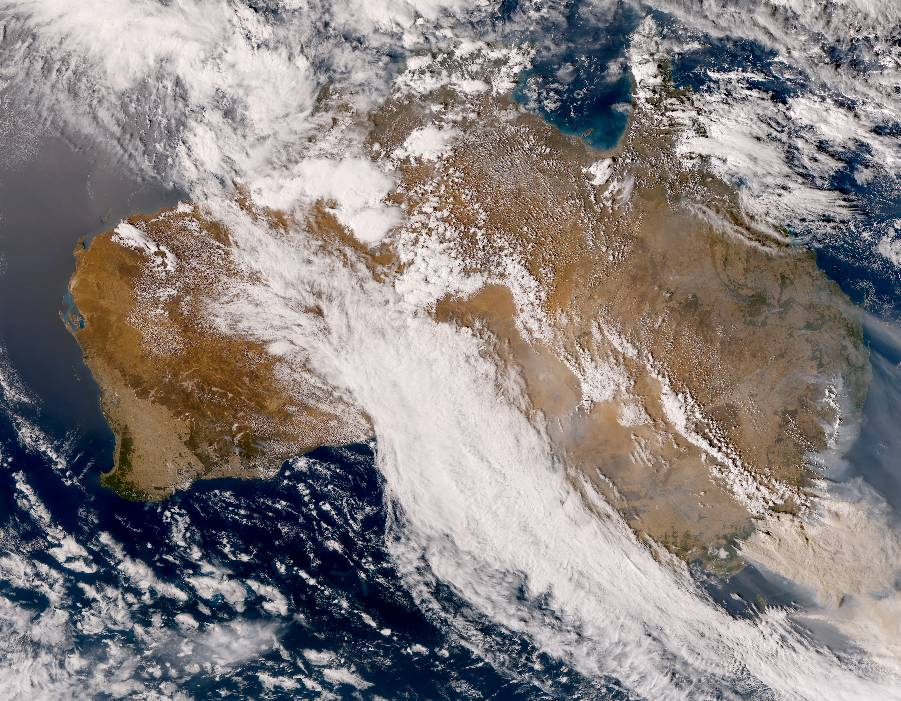
The northwest cloudband coinciding with the 2019–20 Australian bushfire season (January 2020).

The Australian Northwest Cloudband (NWCB), or just Northwest cloudband, is a band of a broad, continuous, moisture-laden cloud that stretches from the tropical east Indian Ocean to southern Australia, which forms in the cool season and generally brings sporadic precipitation across the Australian continent. The NWCB is the third most commonly occurring cloudband in the world and the fourth most frequently occurring cloudband in the Southern Hemisphere.

== Formation ==
Developing a NW–SE orientation and influenced by the Indian Ocean Dipole (IOD) and the Madden–Julian oscillation (MJO), the cloudband forms when moist and warm tropical air on the Indian ocean (near Indonesia) travels towards the southeast and passes over Australia towards the western side of a high pressure system in the southeast, where they ascend over the cooler air in the mid-latitudes within the content and thus create the cloudband. A negative IOD typically causes an increase in northwest cloudbands.

The cloud band occurs when the high-pressure system in the southwest thrusts the cold air from the Southern Ocean to northwest Australia, while the northeastern high pulls warm, moist air from the Coral Sea towards the center of Australia. When the warm northeasterly air clashes with the cold southwesterly airflow, their friction creates a large area of unstable rising air, thus forming clouds. The damp air and cloud that formed over the Indian Ocean then crossbeam the continent. Sea surface temperature gradients in the eastern Indian Ocean, as well as low pressure anomalies (i.e. monsoon lows and tropical depressions) can form the cloudband.

== Background ==
On the warm tropical side, the clouds are generally heavy and convective, which gain a lot of moisture into the upper atmosphere, whereas the lower troposphere is consistently warm and humid. The convection is centered along the NW cloud band since the trade wind inversion is topically weaker. The NW cloudband usually has a high cloud base.

A tropical-extratropical feature, the cloudband provides up to 80% of the annual rainfall for northwestern Australia and up to 40% of the annual rainfall for southwestern Australia, including most of the winter rainfall over northwest Western Australia and Central Australia, which tend to have a drying trend in that season. Southern Australia, though, would receive most of its cloudband-associated rainfall when the band connects with cold front systems. The band increases rainfall over the northwest (Kimberley region and Pilbara), central (Great Victoria Desert region) and southeastern Australia (South Australia, Victoria, New South Wales and Tasmania).

The cloudband is an extensive layer of cloud that tends to be 3,000 km (1,900 mi) to 8,000 km (5,000 mi) long (with a width of at least 450 km (280 mi)) and would link a cold front or cut-off lows at their southeastern end to the ITCZ at their northwestern end. The South Pacific Convergence Zone would often be connected to a NW cloud band. The band is generally around than 5,000 km (3,100 mi) long, where it can stretch from Jakarta in Indonesia down to Hobart, Tasmania. In extreme cases, it can even stretch from a tropical disturbance around the equator just south of Sri Lanka to Tasmania.

== Occurrence ==
They generally occur between March and October, but more during late autumn and early winter when the oceans around the country are warm and the subtropical jet stream is strong. Lasting from a few days to a week, they are more common when temperatures in the eastern Indian Ocean (near Australia) are higher than those in the western Indian Ocean (near Eastern Africa and the Arabian Peninsula). The cloudbands would have a declining trend in late winter and early spring because the country's surrounding oceans would be cooler.
