= Fort Leavenworth National Cemetery =

Historic veterans cemetery in Leavenworth County, Kansas

- U.S. National Register of Historic Places
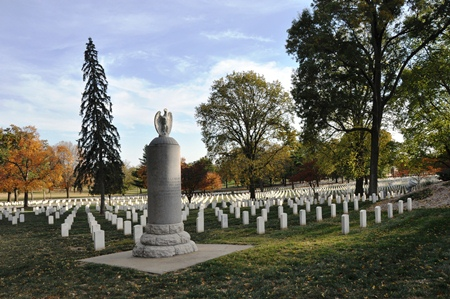
- Fort Leavenworth National Cemetery

- Location within Kansas Location within the United States
- Location: Within Fort Leavenworth military reservation, Fort Leavenworth, Kansas
- Coordinates: 39°21′05″N 94°55′50″W
- Area: 36.1 acres (14.6 ha)
- Built: 1862
- Architectural style: Second Empire
- MPS: Civil War Era National Cemeteries MPS
- NRHP reference No.: 99000834
- Added to NRHP: July 15, 1999

Fort Leavenworth National Cemetery is a United States National Cemetery located on Fort Leavenworth, a United States Army installation north of Leavenworth, Kansas. It was officially established in 1862, but was used as a burial ground as early as 1844, and was one of the twelve original United States National Cemeteries designated by Abraham Lincoln. The cemetery is the resting place of nine Medal of Honor recipients, but most are the less famous casualties of war. It was named for Brigadier General Henry Leavenworth, who was re-interred there in 1902 from Woodland Cemetery in Delhi, New York. Administered by the United States Department of Veterans Affairs, it occupies approximately 36.1 acres (14.6 ha) and was site to over 22,000 interments, as of 2020. It is maintained by Leavenworth National Cemetery.

== History ==
On July 17, 1862, Congress enacted legislation that authorized the purchase of cemetery grounds to be used "for soldiers who shall have died in the service of the country". By 1870, the remains of nearly 300,000 Union dead had been buried in 73 national cemeteries. Most of the cemeteries were located near former battlefields or what were once war time camps. Fort Leavenworth National cemetery was one of the largest, at 36.1 acres. The Leavenworth cemetery was also closely associated with the Western Branch National Military Home, "old soldiers' home" (now VA Eisenhower Medical Center) and became a National Cemetery in 1973.

Due to military tradition, the cemetery was originally divided into burial areas for enlisted personnel and a separate area for officers, but in 1858 the remains were re-interred into a single site. In the years following the Civil War, the bodies of Union soldiers from Kansas City, Kansas and Independence, Missouri, were re-interred at Fort Leavenworth National Cemetery. In addition, the cemetery was used as the burial ground for soldiers who served at frontier posts of New Mexico, Arizona, Colorado and Wyoming. By 1870, there were more than 1,000 Union soldiers interred at Fort Leavenworth, along with approximately 170 civilians and 7 Confederate prisoners of war. After the Indian Wars, between 1885 and 1907 many of the western Army outposts were vacated and as many as 2,000 remains were re-interred at Fort Leavenworth.

Fort Leavenworth National Cemetery was listed on the National Register of Historic Places on July 15, 1999.

== Notable burials ==
- Medal of Honor recipients
  - Captain Harry Bell (1860–1938), for action in the Philippine–American War
  - Captain Thomas W. Custer (1845–1876 †), brother of George Armstrong Custer, two time recipient – first for action at the Battle of Namozine Church, and second for action at the Battle of Sayler's Creek, both during the Civil War
  - Navy Lt. Commander William E. Hall (1913–1996), for action in World War II
  - Corporal John Kile (1846–1870), for action in the Indian Wars
  - Private Fitz Lee (1866–1899), for action in the Spanish–American War
  - Corporal George Miller (1851–1888), for action in the Indian Wars (cenotaph)
  - Private Edward Pengally (1824–1874), for action in the Indian Wars
  - First Sergeant Joseph Robinson (1850–1874), for action in the Indian Wars
  - Private Albert D. Sale (1850–1874), for action in the Indian Wars
  - 1st Sergeant Jacob Widmer (1845–1880), for action in the Indian Wars
- Other Army officers
  - Brigader General William Dorrance Beach (1856–1932), career officer and author
  - Brigadier General William Hemphill Bell (1834–1906), US Army brigadier general
  - Lt. Colonel David Hillhouse Buel (1839–1870), Chief of Ordnance of the Army of the Tennessee
  - First Lieutenant James Calhoun (1845–1876 †), Commander, L Company, 7th Cavalry; brother in law of Lt. Col. George Armstong Custer, killed in action at the Battle of the Little Big Horn, Montana
  - Lieutenant John Lawrence Grattan (1830–1854 †), officer whose poor judgment led to the Grattan Massacre
  - Brigadier General Edward Hatch (1832–1889), commander of the Buffalo Soldier 9th Cavalry Regiment
  - Brigadier General Henry Leavenworth (1783–1834), namesake of Fort Leavenworth
  - Major General William F. Sharp (1885–1947), commander of the ill-fated Visayan-Mindanao Force and Japanese POW
  - Captain Algernon Smith (1842–1876 †), 7th Cavalry Regiment officer who died at Little Bighorn
  - Captain George Wilhelmus Mancius Yates (1843–1876 †), 7th Cavalry under Lt. Col. George Armstong Custer, killed in action at the Battle of the Little Big Horn, Montana

== See also ==
- United States National Cemetery System
