= Albert Sale =

American soldier in the U.S. Army

- Born: 1850; Broome County, New York, United States
- Died: November 28, 1874 (aged 24); Fort Union, New Mexico Territory
- Burial place: Fort Leavenworth National Cemetery
- Military career
- Allegiance: United States of America
- Branch: United States Army
- Service years: 1866–1874
- Rank: Private
- Unit: 8th U.S. Cavalry
- Conflicts: Indian Wars; Apache Wars
- Awards: Medal of Honor

Private Albert D. Sale (1850 – November 28, 1874) was an American soldier in the U.S. Army who served with the 8th U.S. Cavalry in the Arizona Territory during the Apache Wars. He was awarded the Medal of Honor for gallantry against a hostile band of Apache Indians, killing an Apache warrior in hand-to-hand combat and seizing his war pony at the Santa Maria River on June 29, 1869.

== Biography ==
Albert P. Sale was born in Broome County, New York, in 1850. After his father died, Sale and his siblings were placed in Binghamton Children's Home by his mother, who also died soon after. At age 14, he ran away from the home and spent two years on the road before arriving in Dubuque, Iowa. It was there that he enlisted in the United States Army, signing papers indicating that he was of legal age, in August 1866. Sale was assigned to Troop F of the 8th U.S. Cavalry Regiment and spent the next several years on the frontier.

While stationed at Camp Toll Gate, Sale served with the 8th Cavalry in the Arizona Territory during the Apache Wars and was present during the savage fighting in the area during the summer of 1869. On June 26, his unit engaged the Chiricahua Apache in one of the biggest battles of the campaign when Major W.R. Price led a surprise attack against a village on the Santa Maria River, killing four warriors and destroying about 200 dwellings. Sale distinguished himself in a follow-up action three days later in which he fought and killed an Apache brave in hand-to-hand combat, capturing his war pony and other effects. He was officially cited for "personal bravery in the face of the enemy" and awarded the Medal of Honor on March 3, 1870.

Though mustered out of the military shortly afterwards, Sale reenlisted four years later but died of typhoid fever at Fort Union in the New Mexico Territory on November 28, 1874. He was 24 years old. Sale was originally buried at Fort Union but was moved with 286 other graves in 1892 and interred at Fort Leavenworth National Cemetery. He is one of ten Medal of Honor recipients, and one of four Indian War veterans, buried there.

== Medal of Honor citation ==
Rank and organization: Private, Company F, 8th U.S. Cavalry. Place and date: At Santa Maria River, Ariz., 29 June 1869. Entered service at:--. Birth: Broome County, N.Y. Date of issue: 3 March 1870.

Citation:

Gallantry in killing an Indian warrior and capturing pony and effects.

== See also ==
- List of Medal of Honor recipients for the Indian Wars
