= ARkStorm =

Proposed "megastorm" scenario in California, US

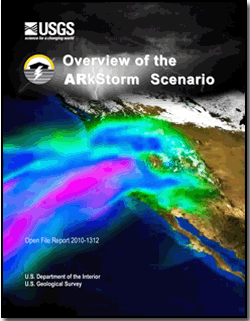
A USGS model image shows the enormous atmospheric river that may have been present during the 1861–1862 flood event.

The ARkStorm (for Atmospheric River 1,000) is a megastorm, whose proposal is based on repeated historical occurrences of atmospheric rivers and other major rain events first developed and published by the Multi-Hazards Demonstration Project (MHDP) of the United States Geological Survey (USGS) in 2010. An updated model was published as ARkStorm 2.0 in 2022.

== ARkStorm 1.0 (2010 Study) ==
The ARkStorm 1.0 scenario describes an extreme storm that devastates much of California, causing up to $725 billion in losses (mostly due to flooding and erosion), and affecting a quarter of California's homes. The scenario projects impacts of a storm that would be significantly less intense (25 days of rain) than the California storms that occurred between December 1861 and January 1862 (43 days). That event dumped nearly 10 feet (3.0 m) of rain in parts of California.

USGS sediment research in the San Francisco Bay Area, Santa Barbara Basin, Sacramento Valley, and the Klamath Mountain region found that "megastorms" have occurred in the years: 212, 440, 603, 1029, c. 1300, 1418, 1605, 1750, 1810, and, most recently, 1861–1862. Based on the intervals of these known occurrences, ranging from 51 to 426 years, such events can be expected to occur, on average, every 100–200 years.

Geologic evidence indicates that several of the previous events were more intense than the one in 1861–1862, particularly those in 440, 1418, 1605, and 1750, each of which deposited a layer of silt in the Santa Barbara Basin more than one inch (2.5 cm) thick. The largest event was the one in 1605, which left a layer of silt two inches (5 cm) thick, indicating that this flood was at least twice as powerful than any of the others recorded.

=== Description ===
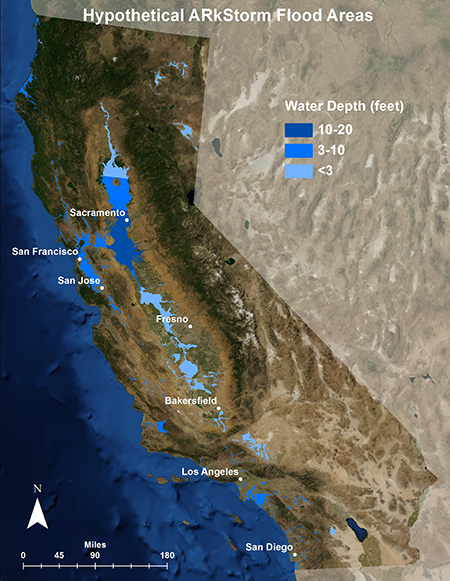
A USGS map shows flooded areas during the 1861–1862 event.

The conditions built into the scenario are "two super-strong atmospheric rivers, just four days apart, one in Northern California and one in Southern California, and one of them stalled for an extra day".

The ARkStorm 1.0 scenario would have the following effects:

- The Central Valley would experience flooding 300 miles (480 km) long and at least 20 miles (30 km) wide.
- Serious flooding also would occur in Orange County, Los Angeles County, San Diego, the San Francisco Bay area, and other coastal communities.
- Wind speeds in some places would reach 125 miles per hour (200 km/h).
- Hundreds of landslides would damage roads, highways, and homes.
- Property damage would exceed $300 billion, most from flooding.
- Demand surge (an increase in labor rates and other repair costs after major natural disasters) could increase property losses by 20 percent.
- Agricultural losses and other costs to repair lifelines, drain flooded islands, and repair damage from landslides, could bring the total direct property loss to nearly $400 billion.
- Power, water, sewer, and other lifelines would experience damage that could take weeks or months to restore.
- Up to 1.5 million residents in the inland region and delta counties would need to evacuate due to flooding.
- Business interruption costs could reach $325 billion, in addition to the $400 billion required for property repair costs, meaning that an ARkStorm scenario is projected to cost $750 billion (~$1 trillion in 2022 dollars), nearly three times the amount of damage predicted by the next "Big One", a hypothetical Southern California earthquake with roughly the same annual occurrence probability.

== ARkStorm 2.0 (2022 update) ==
This update, with parts of the research on impacts still ongoing, has examined how climate change is expected to increase the risk of severe flooding from a hypothetical ARkStorm, with runoff 200% to 400% above historical values for the Sierra Nevada in part due to a decrease in the portion of precipitation that falls as snow, as well as an increase in the amount of water that storms can carry. The likelihood of the event outlined in the ARkStorm scenario is now once every 25–50 years, with projected economic losses of over $1 trillion (or more than five times that of Hurricane Katrina).

Large Atmospheric River Scenarios (2022 data)
	Odds of Occurring					
Scenario	Annual Risk	1920 Risk	2071–2080 Risk (worst case with RCP 8.5)	Days	Precipitation	Damage (if it happened today)
Great Flood of 1862	1.2–1.6%	0.5–0.7%		43+	10 feet (3.0 meters)	
ARkStorm	2–4%		3.4%–4.8%	25+		US$1 trillion+ (2010 estimate in 2022 dollars)

== Implications ==
Current flood maps in the U.S. rarely take recent projections from projects like ARkStorm into account, especially FEMA's maps, which many decision-makers have relied on. Land owners, flood insurers, governments and media outlets often use maps like FEMA's that still fail to represent many significant risks due to: 1) using only historical data (instead of incorporating climate change models), 2) the omission of heavy rainfall events, and 3) lack of modeling of flooding in urban areas. More robust and up-to-date models, like the First Street Foundation's riskfactor.com, should better represent true flood risk though it is unclear if that model, for example, incorporates any ARkStorm science.

Government agencies may decide how much risk to accept, and how much risk to mitigate. The Netherlands' approach to flood control, for example, plans for 1 in 10,000 year events in heavily populated areas and 1 in 4,000 year events in less well-populated areas.

== See also ==
- Extreme weather
- Lists of floods in the United States
- North American Monsoon
- Pineapple Express
- Big One (disambiguation)#Earthquakes
