= 124th Pennsylvania Infantry Regiment =

Union Army infantry regiment

124th Pennsylvania Volunteer Infantry
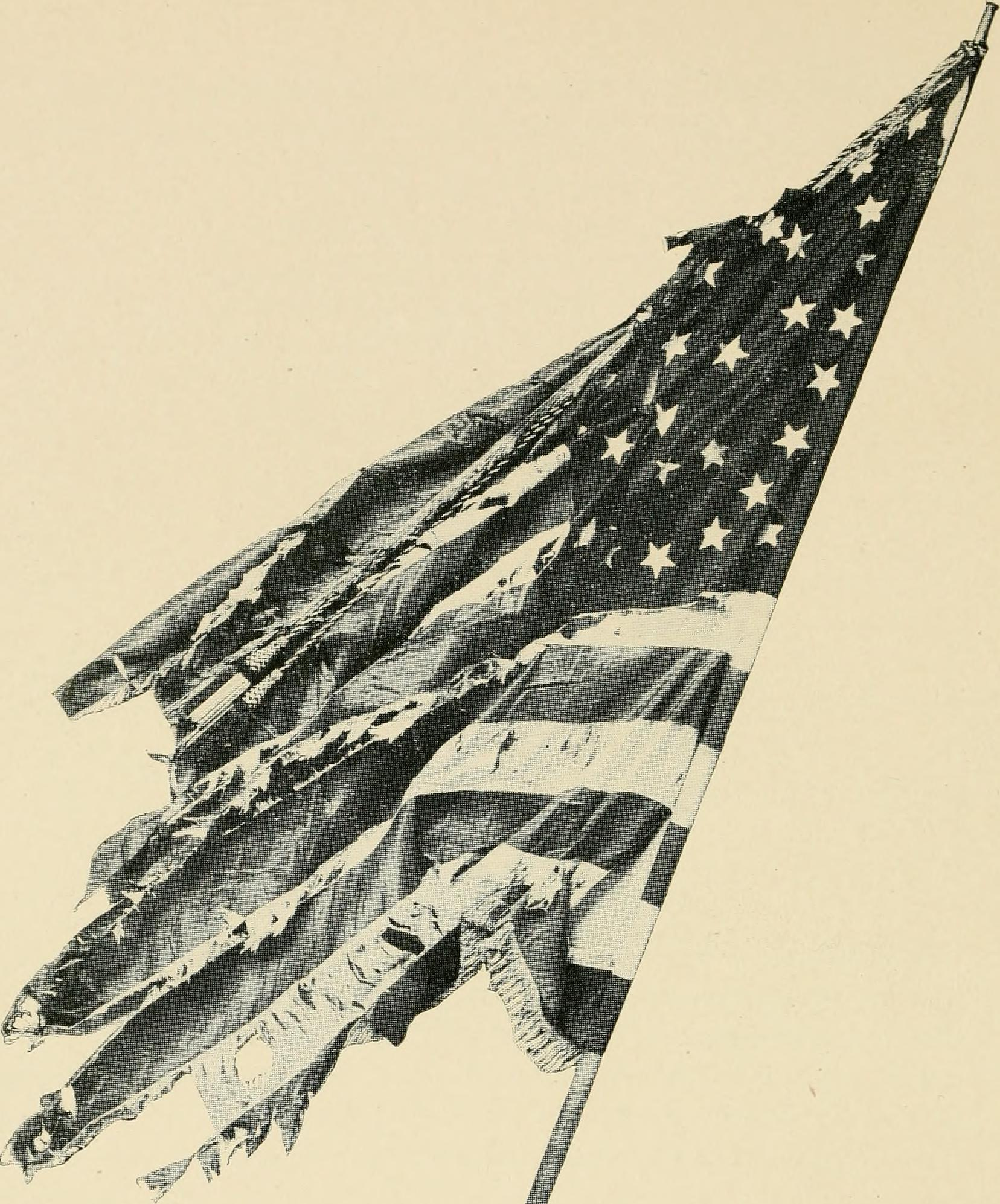
- Battle flag of the 124th Pennsylvania Infantry
- Active: August 1862 - May 16, 1863
- Country: United States
- Allegiance: Union
- Branch: Infantry
- Engagements: Battle of Antietam; Battle of Chancellorsville

The 124th Pennsylvania Volunteer Infantry was an infantry regiment that served in the Union Army during the American Civil War.

== Service ==
The 124th Pennsylvania Infantry was organized at Harrisburg, Pennsylvania, and mustered in August 1862 for nine month's service under the command of Colonel Joseph W. Hawley.

The regiment was attached to 1st Brigade, 1st Division, XII Corps, Army of the Potomac, to October 1862. 2nd Brigade, 1st Division, XII Corps, to January 1863. 2nd Brigade, 2nd Division, XII Corps, to May 1863.

The 124th Pennsylvania Infantry mustered out May 16, 1863 at Harrisburg.

== Detailed service ==
Left Pennsylvania for Washington, D.C., August 12. Camp near Fort Albany, defenses of Washington, until September 7. March to Rockville, Md. Maryland Campaign September 7–24. Battle of Antietam September 16–17. Burying dead September 18. March to Pleasant Valley, Md., September 19–20. At Maryland Heights until October 30. At Loudon Heights until November 8. Reconnaissance up the Shenandoah Valley November 8–19. Near Harpers Ferry until December 10. March to Fredericksburg, Va., December 10–15; then to Fairfax Station. Burnside's 2nd Campaign, "Mud March," January 20–24, 1863. At Stafford Court House until April 27. Chancellorsville Campaign April 27-May 6. Battle of Chancellorsville May 1–5. Ordered to Harrisburg, Pa. for muster out.

== Casualties ==
The regiment lost a total of 54 men during service; 1 officer and 17 enlisted men killed or mortally wounded, 36 enlisted men died of disease.

== Commanders ==
- Colonel Joseph W. Hawley
- Lieutenant Colonel Simon Litzenberg - commanded at the Battle of Chancellorsville
- Major Isaac Lawrence Haldeman - commanded at the Battle of Antietam after Col. Hawley was wounded in action

== See also ==
- List of Pennsylvania Civil War Units
- Pennsylvania in the Civil War
