= Lists of floods in the United States =

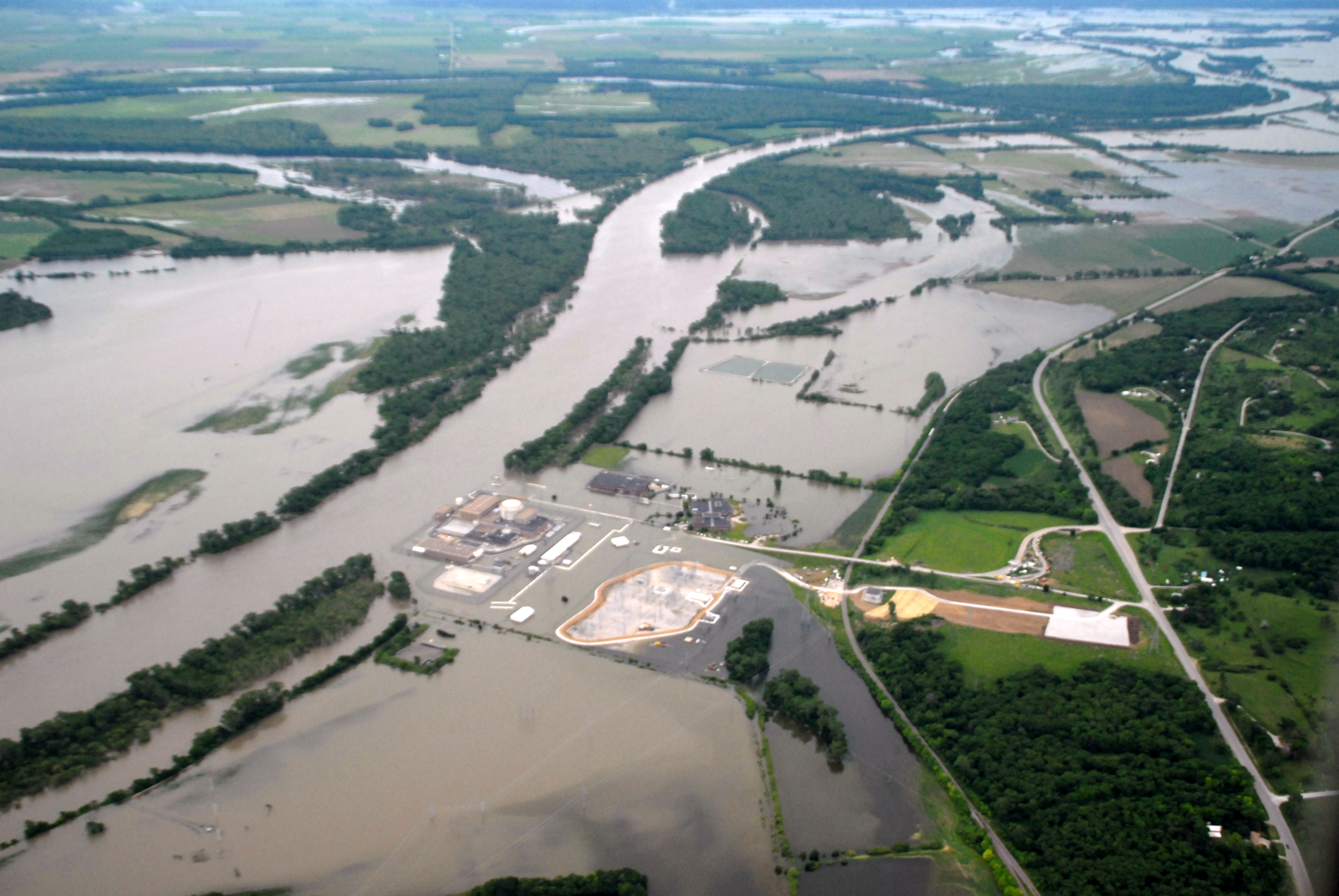
Fort Calhoun Nuclear Generating Station during flood on June 16, 2011

Lists of floods in the United States provide overviews of major floods in the United States. They are organized by time period: before 1901, from 1901 to 2000, and from 2001 to the present.

== Lists ==
- Floods in the United States before 1900
- Floods in the United States (1900–1999)
- Floods in the United States (2000–present)
