= Floods in the United States before 1900 =

Floods in the United States before 1900 is a list of flood events that were of significant impact to the country, before 1900. Floods are generally caused by excessive rainfall, excessive snowmelt, and dam failure.

== Prehistoric events ==
=== Kankakee Torrent ===
The Kankakee Torrent was a catastrophic flood that occurred between 14,000 and 18,000 years ago, resulting from the breach of a large glacial lake formed by the melting of the Wisconsin Glacier. The origin of the flood may have been prehistoric Lake Chicago, it may have come from further east, near what is today the center of the Lower Peninsula of the state of Michigan. The torrent carved out a channel that is currently followed by the Kankakee River and Illinois River. It also appears to have pushed the course of the Ohio River further south and the Mississippi River further west. The bluffs carved by the torrent can be seen at Starved Rock State Park and Kankakee River State Park. In both parks, smaller streams flow over waterfalls before they join the main river, a phenomenon known as hanging tributaries.

=== Glacial River Warren ===
Glacial River Warren drained Lake Agassiz in central North America through a series of floods about 9,700 years ago. The enormous outflow from this lake carved a broad valley now occupied by the much smaller Minnesota River and the Upper Mississippi River. Agassiz was a huge body of water, up to 600–700 feet (180–210 m) deep, and at various times covering areas totaling over 110,000 square miles (280,000 km^{2}). Blocked by an ice sheet to the north, the lake water rose until about 9,700 years ago, when it overtopped the Big Stone Moraine, a ridge of glacial drift left by the receding glacier, at the location of Browns Valley, Minnesota. The lake's outflow was catastrophic at times, and carved a gorge through the moraine a mile (1.6 km) wide and 130 feet (40 m) deep, which is now known as the Traverse Gap. While active, Glacial River Warren cut and eroded a bed up to five miles (8.0 km) wide and 250 feet (76 m) deep. This has left a valley which starts at Traverse Gap near Browns Valley, Minnesota, goes southeast to Mankato, then turns northeast to the Twin Cities.

=== Maumee Torrent ===
The Maumee Torrent was caused by the draining of glacial Lake Maumee, the ancestor of present-day Lake Erie. The flood carved a channel up to 2 miles wide, which today is the site of the Little River in Allen County, Indiana.

=== Missoula floods ===
The Missoula floods are a series of flood outbursts that took place near the end of the last ice age. Much of the unique geography of eastern Washington, named the Channeled Scablands, is thought to have been carved during this period. A glacial lake, located on the Clark Fork River in western Montana is thought to have been the source. The glacial lake outburst floods are thought to have been the result of periodic sudden ruptures of the ice dam on the Clark Fork River that created Glacial Lake Missoula. After each ice dam rupture, the waters of the lake would rush down the Clark Fork and the Columbia River, inundating much of eastern Washington and the Willamette Valley in western Oregon. After the rupture, the ice would reform, recreating Glacial Lake Missoula once again.

=== Bonneville flood ===
The Bonneville flood was a catastrophic flood 14,000 years ago, which involved massive amounts of water inundating parts of southern Idaho and Eastern Washington along the course of the Snake River. Unlike the Missoula Floods, which occurred during the same period, the Bonneville Flood happened only once. The flood is believed to be the second largest flood in known geologic history.

== Sixteenth century ==
=== Flood of March 1543 ===
Hernando DeSoto's party was passing through a village at the confluence of the Mississippi River and Arkansas River on March 18 when the rivers flooded. The high water only allowed passage by canoe and inundated fields surrounding the town. The flooding reportedly lasted for 40 days.

== Seventeenth century ==
=== California Flood of 1605 ===
The California Flood of 1605 was a flood that covered much of California.

== Eighteenth century ==
=== New Hampshire flood – 1740 ===
The Merrimack River flooded in December. It is the first recorded flood in New Hampshire history.

=== New Hampshire/Maine flood – October 1785 ===
In New Hampshire, a significant flood struck the Cocheco, Baker, Pemigewasset, Contoocook and Merrimack rivers on October 23 which established records at Lowell which held until 1902. The Androscoggin River flooded significantly, which destroyed many homesteads in what would become Bethel, Maine. Those that survived the flood moved uphill into less valuable, 100-acre (0.40 km^{2}) plots. Turner's first mill was destroyed during this inundation.

=== Great Pumpkin flood – October 1786 ===
Received its name due to the pumpkins that were washed away in the flood on October 5. It was a major flood in the Susquehanna River basin.

=== Red River of the South flood – 1800 ===
According to the Caddo tribe, a "great flood" moved down the river and reinforced the "Great Log Raft" on the river. This raft was a natural dam that increased water levels on some of the Red River tributaries. This process formed Caddo Lake.

== Early Nineteenth century ==
=== Androscoggin flood – 1806 ===
A significant flood along the Androscoggin River destroyed the first dam built in the town of Turner, Maine.

=== Androscoggin flood – 1811 ===
River flood carries away the toll bridge in Durham, Maine.

=== Androscoggin flood – 1814 ===
A large flood of the river destroyed all the mills in Turner, Maine.

=== Waterville, Maine Freshet – May 1832 ===
This flood washed away a portion of the Ticonic bridge and the Redington saw mill in Waterville, Maine.

=== Androscoggin Freshet – 1843 ===
A flood along the Androscoggin swept the town of Jay's sawmill downstream.

=== Great Flood of 1844 ===
The Great Flood of 1844 is the biggest flood ever recorded on the Missouri River and Upper Mississippi River in terms of discharge. This flood was particularly devastating since the region had little or no levees at the time. Among the hardest hit were the Wyandot who lost 100 people in the diseases that occurred after the flood. The flood also is the highest recorded for the Mississippi River at St. Louis. After the flood, Congress in 1849 passed the Swamp Act providing land grants to build stronger levees.

=== Androscoggin flood – 1846 ===
A flood along the Androscoggin River carried away the bridge in Durham, Maine. This reinstituted ferry service across the river.

=== Potomac flood of October 1847 ===
A significant flood struck the Potomac basin, part of a major flood event which encompassed Pennsylvania, Ohio, Maryland, and Virginia. Damage along the C&O Canal was worst between lock #7 and Widewater, from Great Falls to Pennyfield Lock, Point of Rocks to Dam #4, and surrounding Dam #5. Damages to the canal for the year, which included another flood that November, totaled US$48,000 (1847 dollars).

=== Sauvé's Crevasse – 1849 ===
This was the last of the annual spring Mississippi River floods to swamp New Orleans.

=== Red River of the South flood – August 1849 ===
A flood that appears to have been caused by a tropical cyclone led to the flood of record on the Red River of the South. This flood shifted the river to its present course, moving out of Natchitoches. A remnant of the river known as Cane River extends from Grand Ecore to Colfax.

== Late Nineteenth century ==
=== Midwest and Plains U.S. – 1851 ===
The Flood of 1851 occurred after record-setting rainfalls across the U.S. Midwest and Plains from May to August, 1851. Hardest hit was the State of Iowa, where the city of Des Moines was virtually destroyed, with significant flooding extending to the Lower Mississippi River basin. Historical evidence suggest flooding occurred in the eastern Plains, from Nebraska to the Red River basin, but these areas were sparsely settled in 1851. Heavy rainfall also occurred in the Ohio River basin.

=== Northeast flood – April 1852 ===
In New Hampshire, the Winnipesaukee, Pemigewasset, Contoocook, Blackwater and Ashuelot Rivers went into flood. The Merrimack River at Concord reached its highest levels in nearly 70 years. A flood with higher waters than 1847 surged down the Potomac River. The worst damage was witnessed between Georgetown and Seneca, with breaches at the abutments of Dams 3 and 4 in Maryland, and Dam 6 in Virginia. Damage was estimated at US$80,000 (1852 dollars).

=== Susquehanna River flood – September 1861 ===
Torrential rain and a logjam initiated the flood at the Susquehanna on September 28. Debris in the flood waters swept the Keating railroad bridge away. Sinnemahoning cemeteries were flooded, and some of its bodies moved downstream.

=== The Great Flood of 1862 ===
The largest flood in the recorded history of Oregon, Nevada and California. It began in Oregon in November 1861 after weeks of continuous precipitation, flooding the communities on the Willamette River.

==== California ====
Beginning on December 24, 1861, it rained for almost four weeks. The largest flood in California's recorded history occurred from January 9–12, 1862. The entire Sacramento and San Joaquin Valleys were inundated for an extent of 400–480 km (250–300 mi), averaging 32 kilometres (20 mi) in breadth. The rain created an inland sea in Orange County, lasting about three weeks with water standing 1.3 metres (4 ft 3 in) deep up to 6 kilometres (3.7 mi) from the river.

==== Nevada ====
Flooding began in December, 1861 in Carson Valley from a series of storms in the upper Carson River basin. By January 2, 1862, the town of Dayton and the area surrounding it had been flooded. Samuel Young of Aurora recorded in his diary that the snow and rain had fallen for twenty six days out of thirty since December 24, 1861.

=== Androscoggin River flood – 1863 ===
A large flood along the river destroys the bridge in East Turner, Maine.

=== Saxby Gale flooding – 1869 ===
The combination of the extreme high tide and a hurricane on October 4–5 was dubbed the Saxby Gale. The resultant flooding set records on the East Coast of the United States. The Federal Emergency Management Agency (FEMA) named it a 100-year flood for the Schuylkill River in Philadelphia, cresting 2 feet (0.61 m) higher than Hurricane Agnes in 1972. Washington, DC, was also hit hard.

=== Mill River flood – May 1874 ===
It rained significantly on May 16, 1874, in western Massachusetts. The earthen dam suddenly gave way. A large section of the east bank of the Mill River slid away and was sent downstream. The dam's gatekeeper mounted a horse and rushed down the valley to warn Williamsburg of what was to come. The gatekeeper's wife watched from their cabin as the dam exploded upward. Four riders galloped down the valley as fast as possible to warn people of the oncoming flood. Some residents fled to higher ground, while others refused to believe the awful news. Many never heard the warning. A 6 metres (20 ft) tall flood swept everything away. Damage totaled US$1 million and 144 people died.

Mill towns petitioned Boston for assistance. The legislators eventually granted $120,000 to rebuild bridges and roads, which set a precedent for a state government to provide direct assistance after a natural disaster. The disaster led to improvements in public safety. The Massachusetts legislature imposed standards for the construction, maintenance, and inspection of dams. Engineering of large-scale public projects had to meet state mandates. Engineers became academically trained professionals. Four-fifths of the businesses in the Mill Valley were eventually rebuilt on their original locations. The mill owners gradually regained their financial standing and their place as pillars of society. Factories powered by the rushing Mill River continued to dominate life in the valley for another quarter century, until steam, and then electricity, replaced water power.

=== Potomac flood of November 1877 ===
Higher than the event in 1852 by several feet, this flood affected the whole length of the C&O Canal. Since Conococheague and Antietam Creeks were flooding as well, the worst damage was done to the middle of the canal. Damage totaled US$200,000 (1877 dollars). Navigation could not resume until the following April. A result of this flood was a telephone network being installed along the canal, which was, at the time, the longest telephone circuit in the world.

=== The Great Flood of April 1881 ===
The Great Flood of 1881 struck Omaha, Nebraska and Council Bluffs, Iowa between April 6 and 27, when waters began to recede. Causing millions of dollars in damage, it crested two feet higher than ever-before measured on the Missouri River.

=== Ohio River flood – February 1884 ===
The level of the Ohio River in Parkersburg, West Virginia reached 54 feet (16 m), about 34 feet (10 m) above its normal stage.

The Ohio River crested in Cincinnati at 71.1 feet (21.7 m) on February 14.

=== East Texas flood – May 1884 ===
This significant flood affected the Neches, Angelina, and lower Sabine River basins. Record stages were set during this event, roughly 2–3 feet (or almost a meter) higher than records from the 1900s.

=== Canadian River Basin Flood - 1885 ===
There are no available records of the flood of 1885, but old settlers say it was greater than any for many years prior to that date. An estimate made by Mr. F. Dobson. From cross sections and slope of bed of stream, using Kutter's formula, the maximum discharge is placed at 70,000 cubic feet per second for about one hour.

=== Johnstown – 1889 ===
In the nineteenth century, dams were maintained privately. The Conemaugh Dam was maintained by the South Fork Fishing and Hunting Club, and had been recently rebuilt in 1881. However, on May 31, 1889, after a night of heavy rain, the Conemaugh Dam broke and flooded the surrounding valley. Damage was extraordinary, and the dam was never rebuilt. Also known as the Conemaugh Calamity, after the name of the dam, this flood claimed 2,209 lives. Five days after the event, Clara Barton and her doctors and nurses arrived in Johnstown to tend to the survivors. It took 5 years for the town to recover.

To the east, it was also a major flood for the Susquehanna and its tributaries. The towns of Renovo, Lock Haven, Williamsport, and Sunbury were severely damaged. Damage was not limited to Pennsylvania, however. The flood eclipsed all previous records for water levels on the Potomac, which caused US$300,000 (1889 dollars) to the C&O Canal. The canal would not recover from this flood until 1891.

=== Oil Creek Flood – 1892 ===
Heavy rains resulted in dam failures, causing rapid flooding in the Oil Creek area of Pennsylvania, primarily affecting Titusville and Oil City. Tankers holding highly flammable benzeine were located along the banks of the creek. The tankers were uprooted and emptied as a result of the flooding, and their contents ignited, flooding the impacted areas with fire as well as water. 54 Oil City residents and 72 Titusville residents died either from the fire or the flood waters.

=== Androscoggin flood – March 1896 ===
A spring flood removed the East Turner bridge.

== See also ==
- Floods in the United States (1900–1999)
- Floods in the United States (2000–present)
- Great Flood of 1844
