= General Gibbs =

General Gibbs may refer to:

- Alfred Gibbs (1823–1868), Union Army brigadier general and brevet major general
- David Parker Gibbs (1911–1987), U.S. Army major general
- Edward Gibbs (c. 1777–1847), British Army lieutenant general
- George Sabin Gibbs (1875–1947), United States Army major general
- Roland Gibbs (1921–2004), British Army general

== See also ==
- Alexander Gibb (1872–1958), British Army brigadier general
- Frederick W. Gibb (1908–1968), U.S. Army major general
- Attorney General Gibbs (disambiguation)
