= General O'Connell =

General O'Connell may refer to:

- Daniel Charles O'Connell (1745–1833), French Army general
- J. J. "Ginger" O'Connell (1887–1944), Irish National Army general (later demoted to colonel as part of a reorganization)
- James Dunne O'Connell (1899–1984), United States Army lieutenant general
