= Benjamin F. Fisher =

American general

Chief Signal Officer, U.S. Army Benjamin Franklin Fisher
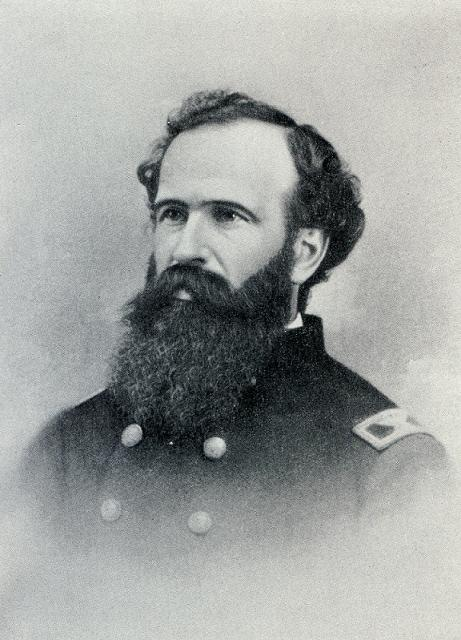
- Born: November 21, 1834; Spring Mills, Pennsylvania, United States
- Died: September 9, 1915 (aged 80); Schuylkill, Pennsylvania, United States
- Education: Franklin & Marshall College
- Military career
- Allegiance: United States (Union)
- Branch: United States Army (Union Army)
- Service years: 1861 – 1867
- Rank: Colonel; Bvt. Brigadier General
- Unit: 3rd Pennsylvania Reserve Regiment
- Conflicts: American Civil War; Peninsula campaign; Maryland campaign; Battle of Chancellorsville; Siege of Petersburg; Battle of the Crater

Benjamin Franklin Fisher (1834-1915) was an American Brevet Brigadier General who was a Chief Signal Officer of the Army of the Potomac during the Siege of Petersburg of the American Civil War. He was also known for being one of the escapees of the Libby Prison escape

== Biography ==
=== Early years ===
Benjamin was born on November 21, 1834, at Spring Mills, Pennsylvania, as the son of the Reverend Peter A. Fisher. Benjamin graduated from the Franklin & Marshall College and his early career consisted of being an attorney at Bucks County, Pennsylvania, before the outbreak of the American Civil War.

=== American Civil War ===
When the war broke out, Fisher was mustered into the Union Army in July 1861 at Doylestown, Pennsylvania, as a 1st Lieutenant as part of Company H of the 3rd Pennsylvania Reserve Regiment however he was then reassigned to the Signal Corps and being promoted to Captain on July 7, 1862. He would then go on to participate in the Peninsula Campaign along with Joseph Hooker. He would also participate at the Maryland campaign as an observer before being made a Chief Signal Officer in June 1863. Fisher then went on to participate at the Battle of Chancellorsville and was praised for his command during the battle as he was one of the first commanders to report Robert E. Lee's movements up the Rappahannock to his home state of Pennsylvania. Afterwards, he left the HQ at Fairfax Station, Virginia, to report to Alfred Pleasonton who was at Aldie, Virginia, but on the way, he was ambushed and captured by John S. Mosby's men and was held as a prisoner of war at Libby Prison.

=== Prison escape ===
During his time as a prisoner, Fisher befriended Colonel Thomas E. Rose as Rose formed a working party with other prisoners in order to break out of the prison. One day at ten in the evening, Fisher and his party crossed the Chickahominy River and passed by the guard at Meadow bridge. On the next day, they hid under a pine thicket several miles beyond the river and would travel at night, avoiding the roads and hid in the thickets and jungles of the Chickahominy swamp during the day. When they reached the vicinity of the White House, a severe snowstorm occurred which caused Fisher and his party to lie for 2 days in order to avoid detection by the Confederates, who were actively searching for the missing men. On the evening of 18 February, Fisher's party were caught by a Confederate search party and fighting broke out with Fisher merely escaping out of sheer determination through the thickets and swamps and arriving on Williamsburg, Virginia, on 21 February along with some other party members that followed Fisher. They were shortly then rescued by Benjamin Butler's cavalry who were searching for the escapees. For his services during the break out, Fisher was promoted to Major of the Signal Corps and reassigned as the Chief Signal Officer of the United States Army, relieving William J. L. Nicodemus.

=== Later years ===
His post war life consisted of Fisher continuing his legal career in Philadelphia, going as far as becoming a registrar of Pennsylvania's 3rd congressional district. He died on Valley Forge at the Schuylkill.

== See also ==
- List of American Civil War brevet generals (Union)
