= Chief Signal Officer of the United States Army =

Commanding officer of the U.S. Army Signal Corps

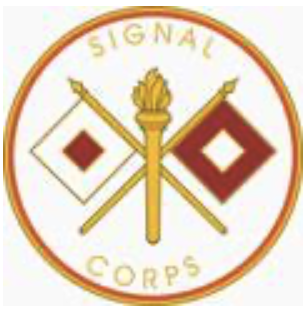
- Department of the Army
- Appointer: The president with Senate advice and consent
- Formation: 28 July 1866
- First holder: Colonel Albert J. Myer
- Final holder: Major General David P. Gibbs
- Abolished: 31 July 1964

The chief signal officer of the United States Army was a position which was established during the American Civil War. Over the course of a century, the chief signal officer was the commanding officer of the U.S. Army Signal Corps which at various times was responsible for combat communications, strategic communications, military aviation, homing pigeons, designing and purchasing the Army's radio, radar, and other electronic equipment, weather reporting, Army photography and motion pictures, collection of signal intelligence, and research and development of technologies as diverse as wig-wag flag signaling, cryptography, FM radio, submarine cable, and satellite communications.

While the office of chief signal officer survived for a century, its responsibilities, role, and position in the Army and American society varied dramatically over time. The office evolved with changing technology, changes in America's role in the world, and the impact of major wars. The chief signal officer was frequently involved in policy discussions with Congress and the rest of the military over the breadth of his responsibilities and the role of the Signal Corps in the Army and American society. The office was eliminated in a 1964 reorganization.

== Predecessor positions ==
=== Signal officer (1860–1863) ===
Albert J. Myer was an Army doctor who proposed a new method of flag signaling in 1856. He was given a hearing on his idea by an examination board chaired by Lieutenant Colonel Robert E. Lee in 1859, and was authorized to conduct tests of his method. The tests were promising, and Myer appeared before the House and Senate Military Affairs Committees to describe them. In June 1860, Congress voted to fund one signal officer on the Army staff with the rank of major to pursue this work. Myer was appointed to the position. His role was to continue experimenting with signal technology to understand its potential usefulness to the Army.

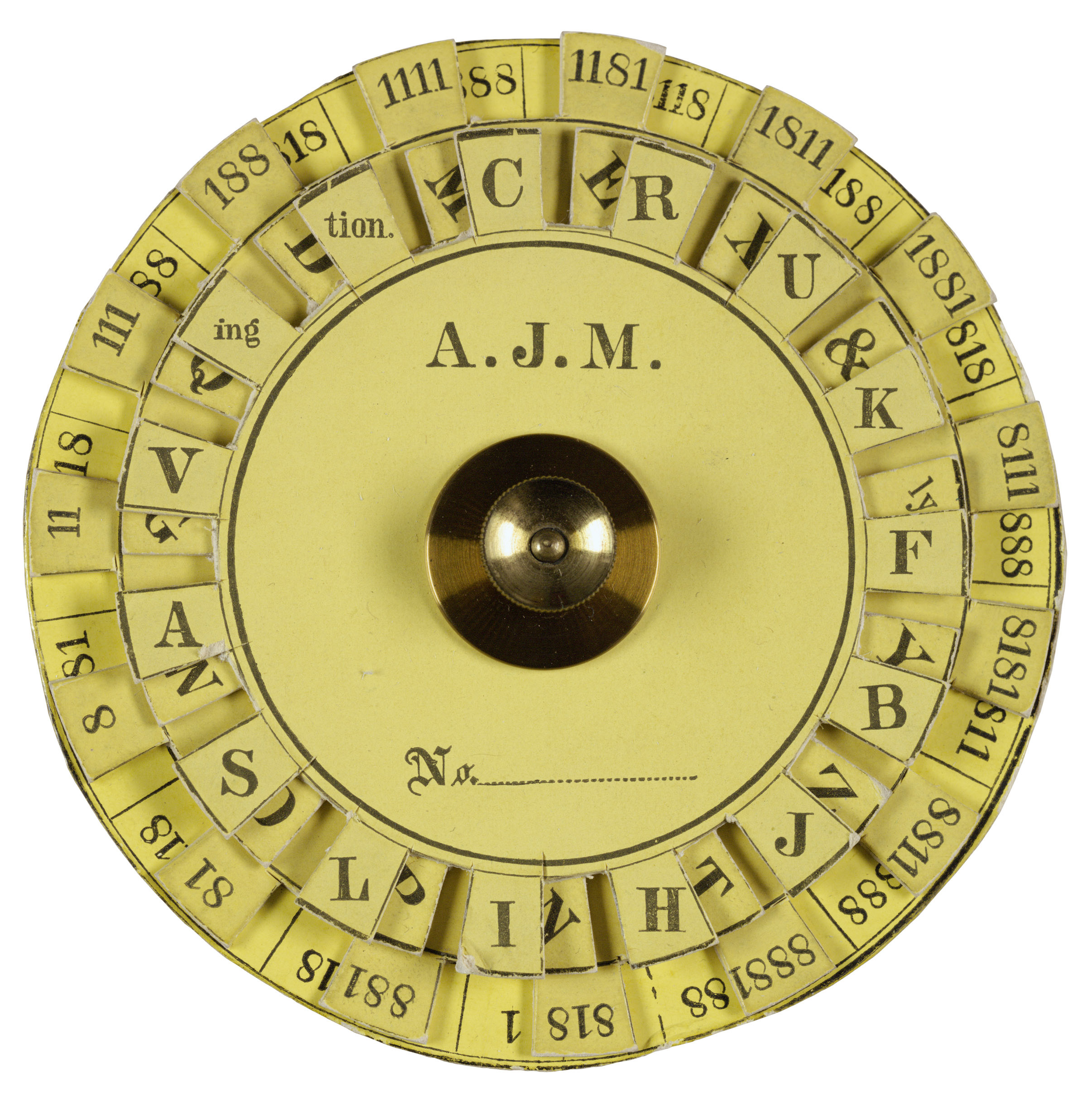
Cipher disk introduced by Chief Signal Officer Myer during the Civil War, an example of early cryptographic efforts. Note Myer's initials on the device.

After the Civil War began, the signal officer took on new functional responsibilities. First and foremost, Myer placed signal teams in the field to support the fighting forces. In 1861 he was assigned to the Army of the Potomac, and began organizing its signal capability. In 1862 the role of the signal officer grew to include developing signal capability in all the Union Armies. By the end of the year there were 146 acting signal officers. An innovation of Myer's in 1862 was the development of portable field telegraph trains that could follow an army into battle.

In order to deploy signal teams to the field, men had to be trained. Myer implemented signaling training programs at both the U.S. Military Academy, and the U.S Naval Academy, as well as schools for training officers and men already in the Army. Myer's vision for communications included combined operations, and he developed links with the U.S. Navy which were tested at the Battle of Port Royal.

Codes and encryption techniques for the Army were developed by the signal officer. Typically, signal stations were on high terrain so that they had a line of sight to the enemy positions they were surveilling. The Confederates could see the signal flags as clearly as the Union forces. The possibility of enemy interception of messages produced an immediate need for codes. Myer introduced simple cipher disks to encrypt messages.

Other than the signal officer, there were no men permanently assigned to signal duties. Generals would detach officers and men from their units for signal duty to be trained, equipped, and organized by Myer. This was unsatisfactory for several reasons, and the signal officer was involved in discussions with the Secretary of War and others as to how best to organize the new signaling function.

=== Signal Officer of the Army (1863–1866) ===
On 3 March 1863, in the midst of the Civil War, Congress enacted into law the position of Signal Officer of the Army. The authorization for this position was temporary, only for the duration of "the present rebellion." The Signal Officer of the Army was to have the rank of Colonel. Congress authorized a staff of one lieutenant colonel, and two majors who were to act as inspectors for the Signal Corps. Each Army Corps or military department was to have one captain, and as many lieutenants as the president saw fit to name, up to eight.

Albert Myer was appointed to the new position. He took the Congressional mandate to mean that the signal officer of the Army should provide all the Army's communications, whether by flag, torch, or wire. This was contrary to the desires of Secretary of War Edwin Stanton. Not only was Myer removed from his post, but all of the wired telegraph services operated by the Signal Corps were transferred to a rival organization, the United States Military Telegraph Corps. For the remainder of the war, the signal officer of the Army oversaw only "aerial telegraphy", signal flags and torches.

== Chief Signal Officer (1866–1964) ==
=== Post-Civil War organization ===
After the Civil War, in 1866, Congress passed a law establishing the peacetime structure of the Army. The new law created the office of Chief Signal Officer of the Army as a permanent position with the rank of colonel, and gave the Secretary of War discretion to assign as many as 6 officers, and 100 non-commissioned officers and enlisted personnel to signal duty. Despite this Congressional support, the Signal Corps was all but disbanded in the immediate post-war period. In his 1866 annual report, Chief Signal Officer Fisher reported that his command had mustered out all personnel except those in his office. He auctioned off leftover material from the war. His job had become assembling records of Civil War operations for future historians.

The U.S. Military Telegraph Corps was abolished. In December 1865 the private telegraph lines which the government had seized at the beginning of the war were returned to their owners. The new lines built by the U.S. Military Telegraph Corps were sold to nearby private companies. By the end of 1866 all of its personnel had been reassigned or dismissed.

=== Weather organization (1870–1891) ===
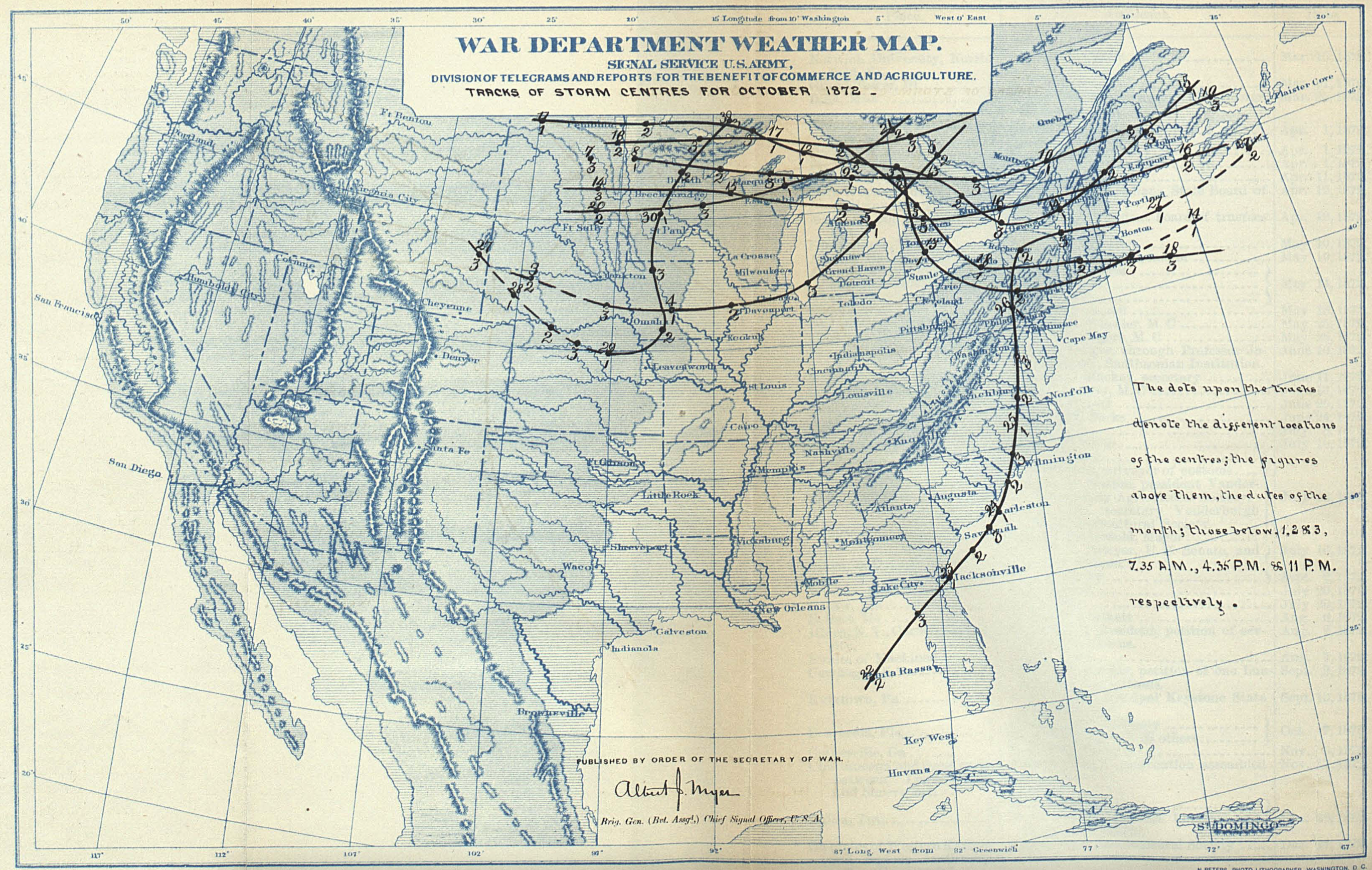
1872 weather map signed by Chief Signal Officer Myer

In 1867 Myer was reappointed chief signal officer. He reimplemented a signaling curriculum at the US Military Academy, continued the development of cryptography, and, with the demise of the U.S. Military Telegraph Corps, regained authority over electric telegraphy. In 1870, Myer secured a major peacetime mission, weather reporting. Congress charged the secretary of war with taking weather observations throughout the country and providing warnings of impending storms. Myer was successful in having this responsibility assigned to the chief signal officer in War Department General Order 29, dated 15 March 1870. Citing the needs of commerce and agriculture for weather information, Congress appropriated $250,000 to support the Signal Corps weather reporting in 1872.

The weather reporting network relied heavily on commercial telegraph lines operated by Western Union and others. The need to include weather observation stations in remote areas, and a Congressional mandate to connect lighthouses and life-saving stations expanded the scope of the chief signal officer's responsibilities. He began building an extensive network of telegraph cables within the United States beginning in 1873. This network peaked at 5,077 miles in 1881, before the growth of commercial circuits and budget cuts forced the Signal Corps to begin retiring its lines. In June 1880, Congress raised the permanent rank of the chief signal officer to brigadier general, reflecting both its increased importance and parity with similar Army bureaus.

When Chief Signal Officer Greely took over in 1887, the weather bureau dominated Signal Corps activities. Military signaling had fallen into disuse and Secretary of War William C. Endicott reported that, "The Army has ceased to place reliance on the Signal Corps, but provides for its own instruction in military signaling." This issue persisted, and in his first state of the union message in December 1889, President Benjamin Harrison called on Congress to transfer the Weather Bureau to the Department of Agriculture, noting the deterioration of military signaling. Congress obliged in 1890 and the transfer of responsibility took place on 1 July 1891. The chief signal officer lost the civilian Weather Bureau, but maintained responsibility for weather reporting and forecasting for the Army.

=== Rebuilding military signaling (1891–1898) ===
The legislation which removed the Weather Bureau from the Signal Corps, also included explicit language as to the scope of the chief signal officer's responsibilities: "The Chief Signal Officer shall have charge, under the direction of the Secretary of War, of all military signal duties, ...the construction, repair, and operation of military telegraph lines, ...and the duty of collecting and transmitting information for the Army by telegraph or otherwise." The law provided for the Signal Corps to be composed of the chief signal officer, one major, four captains, four first lieutenants, and fifty sergeants.

Although the weather reporting network was gone, telegraph communications among coastal defense installations and between military bases remained within the purview of the chief signal officer. This included about 700 miles of lines in 1894. Appropriations for anything beyond personnel were small, but under Chief Signal Officer Greely, a number of technical innovations were explored. Experiments included observation balloons, telephones, light-weight field telegraph circuits, and training state reserve units in signaling. Future Chief Signal Officer James Allen was successful in duplexing telegraph and telephone circuits on the same wire. The commanding general of the Army referred to Greely favorably as "our enterprising chief signal officer."

=== Spanish-American War organization (1898–1899) ===
On 25 April 1898, Congress declared war on Spain, beginning the Spanish-American War. While Chief Signal Officer Greely had made progress in recovering the Signal Corps' military signaling capabilities, its 60 members were in no way adequate to support simultaneous offensives in Cuba, Puerto Rico, and the Philippines. The United States occupied Guam and annexed Hawaii that same year, adding further to the Army's communications requirements.

In May 1898, Congress authorized the president to create a volunteer signal corps to meet the new needs on a temporary basis for the duration of "the existing war." The Volunteer Signal Corps, which reported to the chief signal officer, was to consist of one colonel, one lieutenant colonel, one major, for each Army corps an additional major, and for each Army division up to two captains, two first lieutenants, two second lieutenants, fifteen sergeants, ten corporals, and thirty privates. Two-thirds of these men were to be skilled electricians or telegraphers. Just over 1,100 officers and men were inducted into the volunteer corps. They were organized into nineteen companies. The 15th Volunteer Signal Company reached Cuba, four companies of volunteers made it ashore in Puerto Rico, and two were dispatched to Manila. The war was over before the remainder of the volunteers could be deployed overseas.

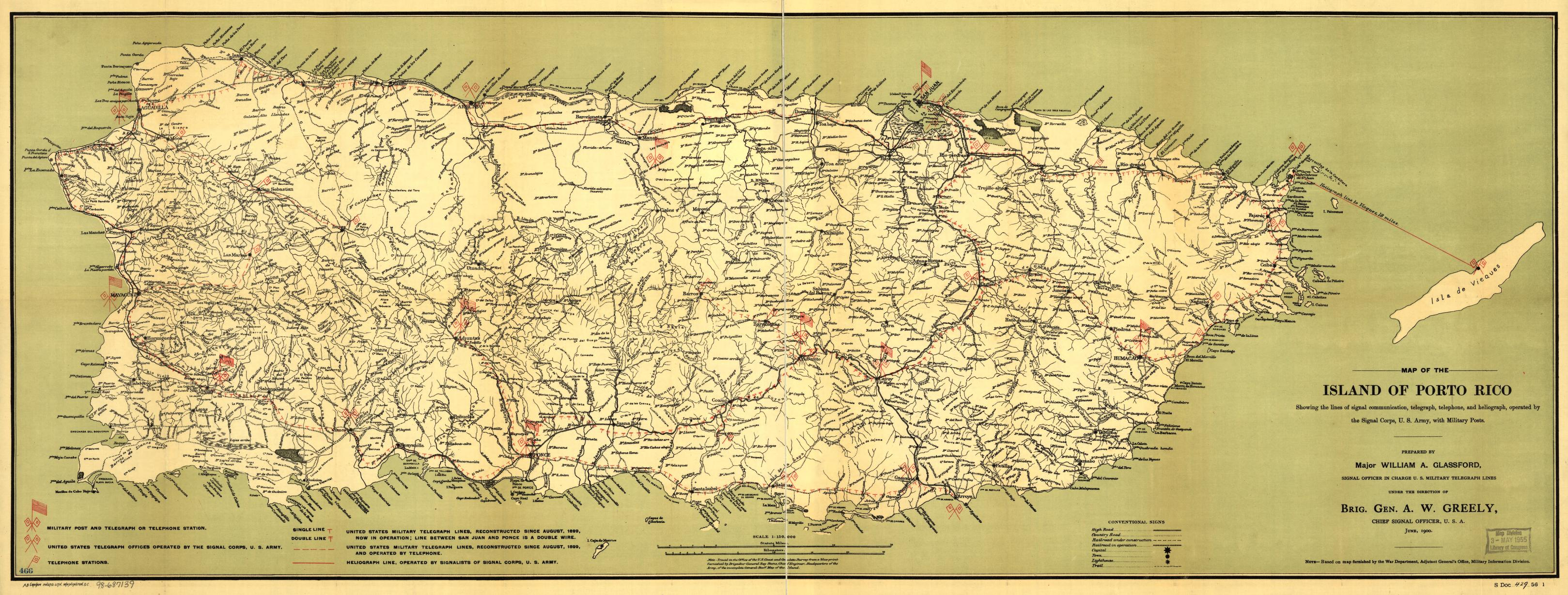
Signal Corps network on Puerto Rico in 1899

The regular Army portion of the Signal Corps was enlarged during the conflict to include the chief signal officer, a colonel, a lieutenant colonel, two majors, five captains, nine first lieutenants, forty sergeants, fifty corporals, and three hundred privates. Many of the regular troops were dispersed to the volunteer companies to provide leadership to the recruits. Enough regulars remained for the chief signal officer to create four companies, designated A, B, C, and D. Companies A and D saw service in Puerto Rico.

Just as Lincoln had done in the Civil War, President McKinley nationalized all telegraph circuits in the United States for the duration of the war. The chief signal officer was given operational control of the networks. There was a particular focus on international cables which terminated in New York, Tampa, and Key West which might be used to transmit sensitive information to Spanish authorities. Enciphered messages and reporting on American troop movements were banned. The plain-text messages that remained were harvested for intelligence, which may have played a role in the destruction of the Spanish fleet in Cuba. The chief signal officer was, for a time, America's chief censor and signals intelligence officer.

At the conclusion of hostilities, the Volunteer Signal Corps companies were mustered out at various times in 1898 and 1899.

=== Global expansion (1899–1903) ===
1903 Signal Corps lines in the Philippines

The acquisition of the Philippines, Cuba, Puerto Rico, Guam, and Hawaii in 1898 transformed America into a global empire. The discovery of gold on the Klondike and at Nome made Alaska another new center of American interest at the same time. This global expansion of American interests brought global responsibilities to the chief signal officer.

In Cuba and Puerto Rico, the chief signal officer took over all the communications networks on the islands during the military occupation after the surrender of the Spanish. Some telephone and telegraph networks had been damaged during the war, and others were deemed inadequate for the Army's needs. These networks were repaired, extended in geographic scope, and modernized. The Signal Corps turned the telephone and telegraph companies over to the newly constituted civilian government in Puerto Rico in February 1901 and in Cuba in May 1902.

The chief signal officer also took responsibility for the communications networks in the Philippines. Here there was ongoing fighting with an indigenous independence movement, so there was need for a mix of civilian and battlefield communications. General Otis and General MacArthur, commanding the American troops in the Philippines, complained of communication difficulties. The Army was dependent on slow, ship-borne mail for communications to many locations. Solving this issue required thousands of miles of new land-line and submarine cables.

In order to lay the submarine cables specially-equipped cable ships were required. The responsibility for acquiring and operating the ships was given to the Army Quartermaster Corps, while the responsibility for laying the cables was the chief signal officer's. The control of cable ships was a source of friction between the two departments. In any case, USAT Burnside began laying cable between the Philippine islands in December 1900. Future Chief Signal Officers Allen and Squier were aboard as this work began. Just as in the Caribbean, a new civilian government was constituted, but due to ongoing fighting, the transition of the telephone and telegraph businesses to civilian control extended from 1902 to 1907.

In 1900 the only telegraphic communication to Alaska was through a British-owned cable from Canada that connected with Skagway. Congress voted to fund a broad communications network across the territory to be built and operated by the chief signal officer. This was a multi-year effort which Congress extended and expanded several times through 1909. The original intent of the network was to link the Army installations in Alaska, but subsequent funding by Congress connected the network to the continental United States via undersea cable to Seattle. To reach the remote upper Yukon area, Chief Signal Officer Greely negotiated a cooperative agreement with Canadian authorities to extend their network from Dawson to Fort Egbert. He personally scouted a portion of the land route in 1900, and was aboard USAT Burnside when she laid undersea cable in 1903.

During 1900, the chief signal officer supported the American Expeditionary Force which intervened in China during the Boxer Rebellion, laying telegraph cable from the Taku Forts on the coast to Beijing, keeping pace with the Army. The Signal Corps withdrew from China in March 1901.

=== Root reorganization (1903–1916) ===
The Spanish-American War highlighted a number of issues in Army organization. One that touched the chief signal officer was that he reported directly to the secretary of war and all of the troops in the Signal Corps reported to him. Thus, the Signal Corps troops in the field were not in the chain of command of the generals who led the armies. The lack of unified command caused inefficiency in both planning and operations. Secretary of War Elihu Root proposed, and in 1903 Congress established, a chief of staff of the Army and specified that the heads of the major bureaus, including the chief signal officer, would report to the new position. The hope was that the general staff could force a more unified approach to planning and operations, but as the chief signal officer and other bureau heads continued to command self-contained units which had their mission, funding, and personnel specified directly by Congress, this vision was not fully realized.

=== Signal Corps aviation organization (1893–1918) ===
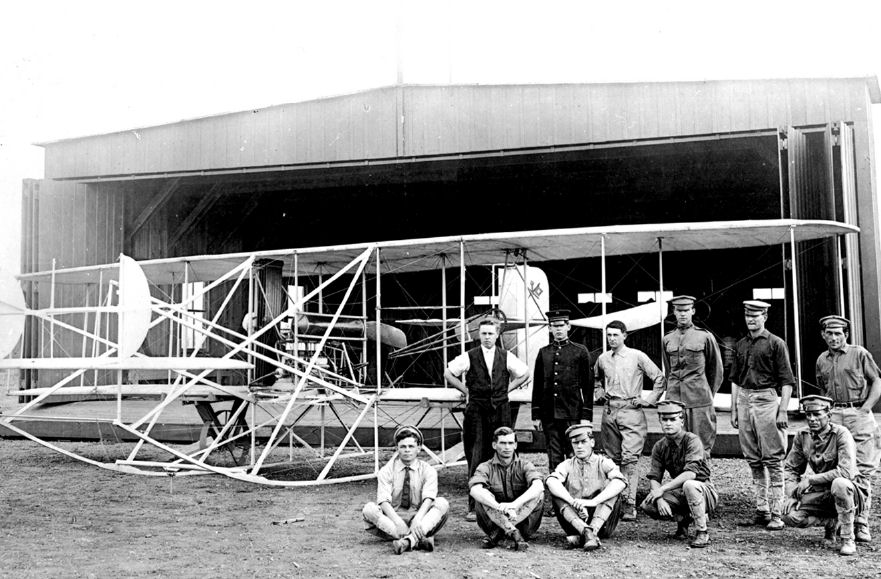
Signal Corps Aircraft No. 1 in 1910

One of the roots of the Signal Corps, going back to Albert Myer's wig-wag flags, was the observation of enemy forces and reporting their position. In 1893 Chief Signal Officer Greely purchased a balloon and began instructing signal officers as to its use as an observation platform at the signal school at Fort Riley, Kansas. This balloon was deployed briefly in Cuba during the Spanish-American War in a controversial incident. Details of Spanish troop movements were indeed sighted, but the balloon drew fire from Spanish forces who shot it down. Nonetheless, Greely continued to experiment with balloons and zeppelins. Chief Signal Officer James Allen established the Aeronautical Division of the Signal Corps on 1 July 1907 to pursue this work.

Congress eliminated the War Department's $200,000 funding request to acquire heavier-than-air planes in the 1907 budget, but the War Department Board of Ordnance and Fortification diverted some of its authorized funding to the Signal Corps to acquire the Army's first aircraft from the Wright Brothers in 1908. As European powers built substantial air arms prior to World War I, work on military aircraft in the United States proceeded without the benefit of Congressional funding until 1911. Congress established the Aviation Section as a separate organization within the Signal Corps in July 1914.

Several issues in Aviation Section management arose between 1915 and 1917, one of which led to Chief Signal Officer Scriven being censured by Secretary of War Newton Baker. The section was so underfunded that when America entered World War I in 1917 the nation had no combat aircraft, and little infrastructure to produce them. The 55 planes in the Army were all trainers. After war was declared, Chief Signal Office Squier testified before the House Military Affairs Committee that he hoped to build a fleet of 22,625 planes. These would cost $363,000,000 for engines, and $276,000,000 for airframes, pilots, ammunition and other costs. In July 1917 Congress passed a $640,000,000 appropriation to fund this fleet, the largest for any single program in American history to that point, without a dissenting vote in the House of Representatives.

Squier's vision of a large air fleet could not be achieved in a matter of months and frustration grew with the lack of combat-effective air units and progress towards fielding them. This was not the only challenge the war had surfaced, so Congress granted the president the power to override its very specific legislation on government organization to allow him to reorganize for better results. This new power was first exercised on the Aviation Section. While enormous progress had been made in establishing America's aerial capabilities in the nine months since Congress funded the program, President Wilson removed responsibility for military aviation from the chief signal officer by executive order on 20 May 1918.

=== National Defense Acts of 1916 and 1920 ===
Congress passed an extremely detailed law that specified the precise size, structure, and organization of the Army, the National Defense Act of 1916. The Signal Corps was specified as consisting of the chief signal officer, three colonels, eight lieutenant colonels, ten majors, thirty captains, seventy-five first lieutenants, and the Aviation Section. The Aviation Section was specified as consisting of one colonel, one lieutenant colonel, eight majors, twenty four captains, and one hundred and fourteen first lieutenants. The enlisted strength of the Signal Corps was to be determined by the president. The act reduced the size and scope of the general staff, increasing the relative authority and independence of bureau heads, including the chief signal officer.

Congress assessed lessons learned in World War I, and produced the National Defense Act of 1920 which updated the National Defense Act of 1916. This new law affected the chief signal officer in several ways. First, the office was given a fixed term of four years. Second, the rank of the chief signal officer was raised to major general. Third, the regular Army portion of the Signal Corps was authorized at 301 officers and 5,000 enlisted men.

=== World War I organization ===
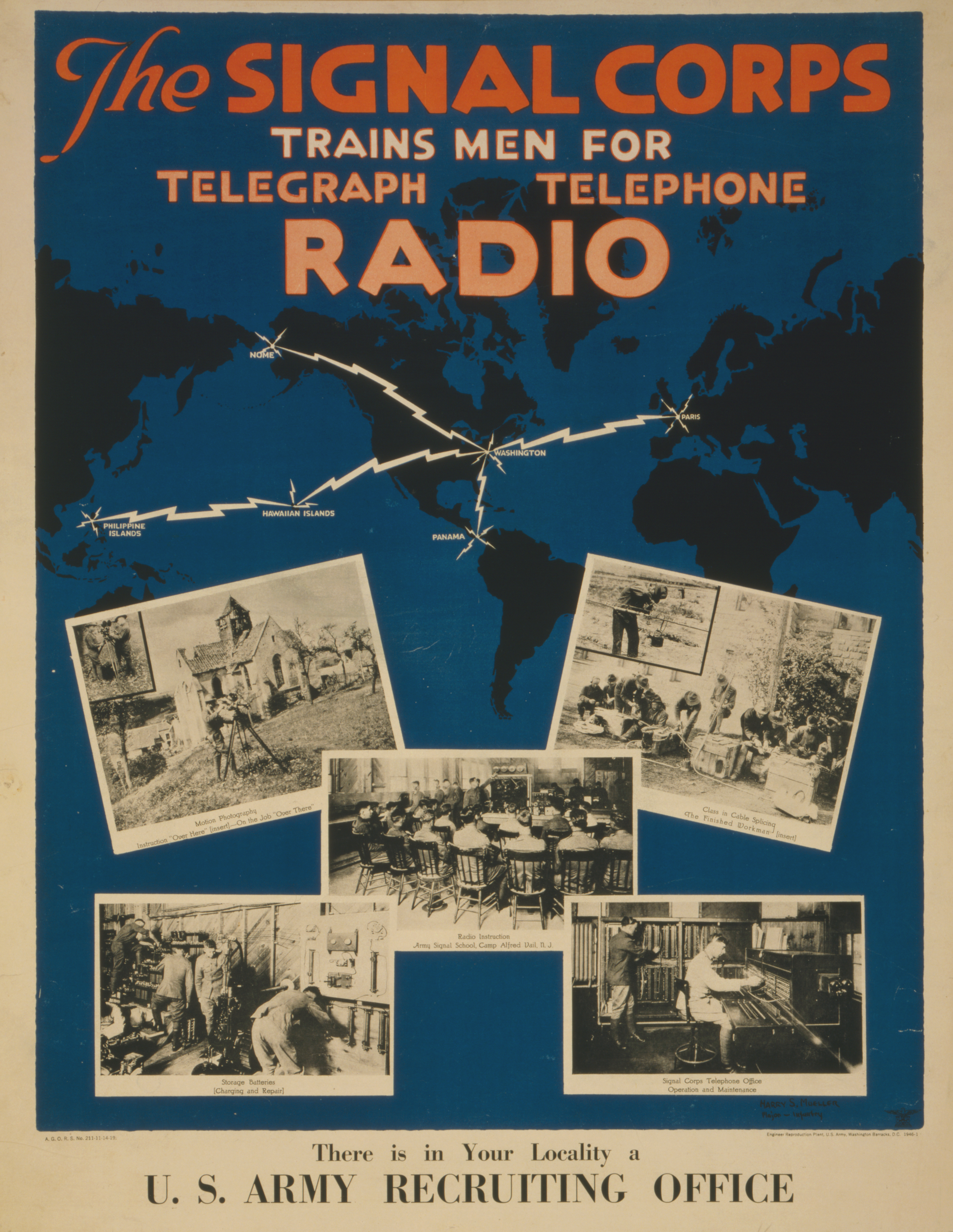
Recruiting was one of the largest challenges facing the chief signal officer in World War I

On the day Congress declared war, the Signal Corps had 55 officers and 1,570 enlisted men, an inadequate force to support the Army expansion contemplated. Chief Signal Officer Squier met with Theodore Vail, president of AT&T, and Newcomb Carlton, president of Western Union, and secured their support to mobilize their employees to produce battalions of signal troops which could be sent to the American Expeditionary Force in France. New schools were opened, and national guard and reserve units were mobilized. In total, the Signal Corps expanded to 2,712 officers, 53,277 enlisted men, and thousands of civilians during the war.

Both rapid expansion and the removal of the Aviation Section caused Chief Signal Officer Squier to reorganize the Signal Corps multiple times in 1917 and 1918. A change with significance for the coming decades was the establishment, in July 1918, of a new Engineering and Research Division which had Radio Development and Electrical Engineering Sections. Future Chief Signal Officer Mauborgne headed the Radio Development section. As early as 1903, the Signal Corps integrated wireless communications into its network to replace the submarine cable between St. Michael and Nome, Alaska which was broken every winter by the polar ice pack. It had experimented with radio ever since, but with these organizations established in World War I, the Signal Corps was able to make continuous progress towards the range of radio, radar and other electronics which it provided in World War II.

After the armistice was signed in November 1918, the Signal Corps shrank rapidly. By August 1919, all reserve, national guard, and conscript personnel were demobilized. Chief Signal Officer Squier's field troops shrank from 56 battalions to 10, and by 1922 to 1.

=== Interwar organizational changes ===
The Army assessed its experience in World War I and developed new doctrine. A major change was that the Signal Corps was no longer responsible for tactical communications below the division level. Chief Signal Officer Squier argued against this change, but lost. The chief signal officer was still responsible for communications from the President down to the divisions, but from 1922 on, the infantry, artillery, armor, cavalry, and Air Corps, took responsibility for implementing their own low-level unit communications using equipment supplied to them by the Signal Corps. Since the demobilization after World War I eliminated almost all formations above the divisions, this doctrine change had the effect of all but eliminating the chief signal oficer's role in tactical communications. It also affected research and development priorities. Without trained signal troops at the front, equipment needed to be easier to install, maintain, and operate. This ultimately led to such innovations as simple push-button, crystal-controlled frequency selection as on the SCR-508 radio which was used in Sherman tanks in World War II.

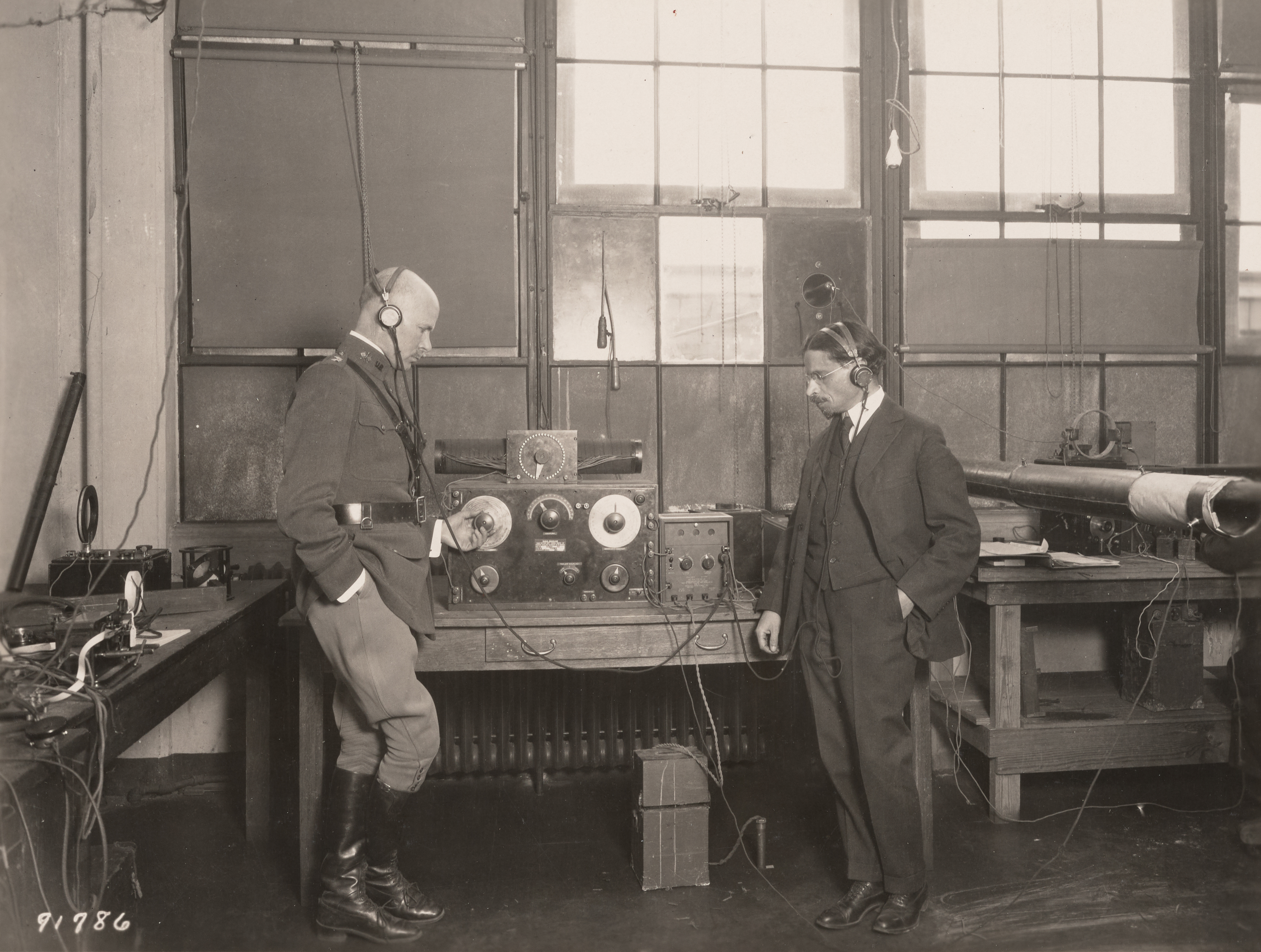
Chief Signal Officer Squier at the radio lab in 1922

Chief Signal Officer Squier established a section responsible for compiling Army codes and ciphers on 1 January 1921. Within the Army, however, the Adjutant General was responsible for printing, storing, distributing, and accounting for them, and Army Intelligence for decrypting the codes and ciphers of others. This last function was jointly funded by the Army and State Department until 1929 when Secretary of State Henry Stimson withdrew funding. Army Regulation 105-5, issued 10 May 1929, sought to deal with the fragmentation of effort by centralizing all these code and cipher functions within the office of the chief signal officer. Chief Signal Officer Gibbs established the Signal Intelligence Service to execute this mission.

During the interwar period, the Signal Corps had control of not just of wired and radio communications equipment, but almost all electronics used in the Army including aircraft navigation systems, radar, and ordinance guidance systems. This created friction with other organizations which wanted to control their own research, development, and procurement. Chief Signal Officer Allison and the head of the Army Air Corps, Major General Benjamin Foulois, held a conference on this topic in 1935 which resulted in the Signal Corps retaining sole authority in electronics.

When the civilian Weather Bureau was transferred out of the Signal Corps in 1891, the chief signal officer retained control of weather reporting and forecasting for the Army. The growing requirements of the Air Corps, which became the primary user of weather data, strained the budget and priorities of the Signal Corps in the 1930s. As of December 1936, the Air Corps had more weather officers than the Signal Corps, yet the responsibility for military weather reporting and forecasting remained with the chief signal officer. As with the contention over electronics, this conflict in priorities resulted in a series of debates and studies as to how best to organize the Army. Chief Signal Officer Allison proposed that if he could not get more resources to expand the weather service, that it should be transferred to the Air Corps. Secretary of War Henry Hoodring ordered the transfer of responsibility to be effective on 1 July 1937. The Signal Corps transferred 40 weather stations, 22 officers, and 180 enlisted men to the Air Corps Weather Section, but retained sole authority over the instruments and electronics used by the section.

=== World War II organization (1942–1945) ===
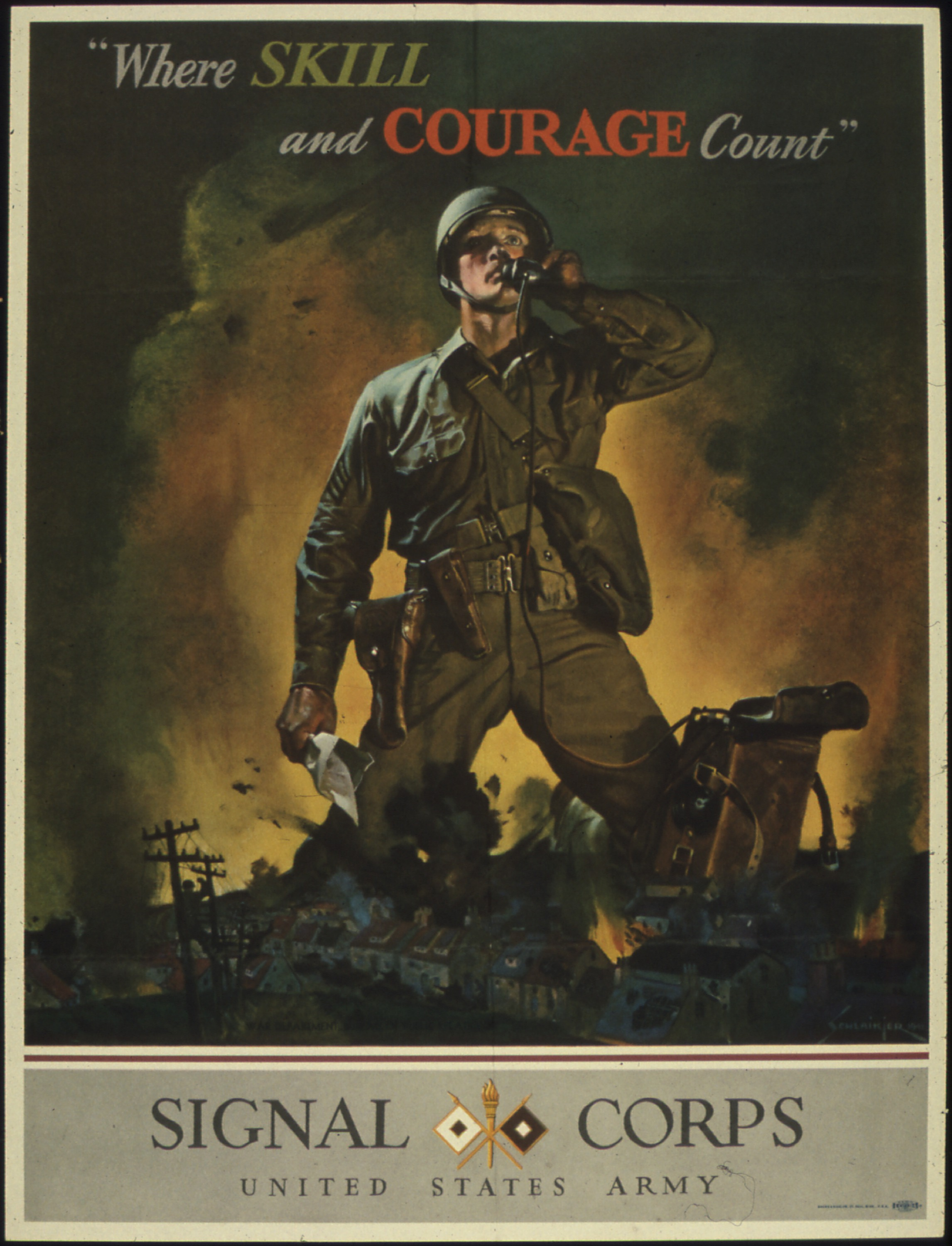
Signal Corps personnel grew 100-fold during World War II, making recruitment and training a major issue for the chief signal officer

At General George C. Marshall's suggestion, Franklin Roosevelt ordered the Army reorganized into three commands effective 9 March 1942. They were ground forces, air forces, and services of supply, later renamed the Army Service Forces. Under this organization, the chief signal officer reported to the commanding general of the Army Service Forces, Lieutenant General Brehon B. Somervell. Although still classified as a combat arm, this reorganization had the effect of reducing the Chief Signal Officer's influence relative to the ground and air forces, and creating additional layers of management between the general staff and Signal Corps. Chief Signal Officer Olmstead found it difficult to operate in this new structure and retired on 30 June 1943.

Massive wartime demand for radios, radar, and other electronic equipment, maintenance, and spare parts strained the Signal Corps and the American industrial base. From 1942 on the Army Air Corps wanted more than the Signal Corps could deliver, and argued that the answer to the problem was to allow it to do its own research, development, procurement, and maintenance. There was a series of studies and organizational debates which ultimately reached General Marshall, who sided with the Air Corps. While Chief Signal Officer Ingles argued against the plan, on 26 August 1944 he was ordered to transfer the Signal Corps personnel and assets which were devoted to supporting the Air Corps. This took place in phases which extended beyond the end of World War II and involved thousands of military and civilian personnel.

The successor to the Signal Intelligence Service, the Signal Security Agency, grew to over 10,000 people by the end of World War II. This massive intelligence effort was hampered in that the interception, interpretation, and use of the information were organized in different parts of the Army. Chief Signal Officer Ingles argued against this transfer as well, but the Signal Security Agency was transferred to the operational control of the Assistant Chief of Staff for Intelligence on 10 December 1944.

As in previous wars, Chief Signal Officers Olmstead and Ingles faced massive recruiting and training challenges in World War II. On 30 June 1939 there were 288 officers and 3,811 enlisted men in the Signal Corps. By mid-1942 this had expanded forty-five times to 7,694 officers, 121,727 enlisted, and 54,000 civilian personnel. A year later this had doubled again to approximately 27,000 officers and 287,000 enlisted personnel. At its peak in the fall of 1944, 350,000 men and women served in the Signal Corps and tens of thousands more civilians assisted.

=== Post-war organization (1946–1961) ===
At the end of World War II, the Army Service Forces organization was abolished in order to eliminate layers of management. The chief signal officer once again reported directly to the Army chief of staff, as the office had prior to the Marshall reorganization. The reorganization was executed by War Department Circular 138, dated 14 May 1946, and was implemented under the authority of President Truman's Executive Order 9722.

The Army Organization Act of 1950 superseded the National Defense Acts of 1916 and 1920. The law specified that there would be a chief signal officer whose rank would be major general. Unlike previous legislation, however, Congress made no attempt to specify the size, composition, and mission of the Signal Corps, leaving discretion to the secretary of the army and the chief of staff.

The deputy chief of staff for logistics position was established in September 1954, replacing the former assistant chief of staff G-4 role. This new office was intended to consolidate supply functions in the Army under one leader. The chief signal officer reported to this newly created position.

=== McNamara reorganization (1961–1964) ===
As the Kennedy administration took office in 1961, the chief signal officer was responsible for the third largest branch of the Army. The Signal Corps' specialty in electronics touched every other branch in the service, often to those branches frustration. Not only was there friction between the chief signal officer and other branches of the Army, but the newly-installed Secretary of Defense, Robert McNamara, sought to improve the efficiency of the Army. His Project 80 working group recommended a functional reorganization. Its plan would strip the Signal Corps and the other technical services of their operational, training, personnel management, doctrine, and logistical functions. In January 1962, President Kennedy approved the plan. As part of this reorganization, effective 1 August 1962, the chief signal officer reported to the deputy chief of staff for military operations.

The 1962 reorganization created both short-term friction as people learned their new jobs, and revealed structural issues which required further consideration. Chief Signal Officer Cook retired in frustration in 1963, triggering additional study of the chief signal officer position. As a result of this work, on 1 March 1964 the office of chief signal officer was abolished. The chief signal officer's remaining operational responsibilities were assigned to the newly-created US Army Strategic Communications Command. Major General Gibbs became Chief of Communications-Electronics, a staff position which could take an Army-wide perspective on technology matters.

== Successor positions ==
=== Chief of Communications–Electronics (1964–1967) ===
The chief of communications-electronics reported to the deputy chief of staff for military operations. The role was purely a staff position, having no operational responsibilities. It was responsible for Army radio spectrum and call sign management, Army representation on various coordinating boards related to communications, review of Army communications plans and budgets, and advising the general staff on communications matters.

=== Strategic Communications Command (1964–1973) ===
The United States Army Strategic Communications Command was upgraded to a major command in the reorganization that abolished the chief signal officer position. It was commanded by a major general. The strategic communications command installed, maintained, and operated all the Army's long-distance networks, which it took over from the chief signal officer. It also absorbed the Joint Communication Agency at Fort Richie, Maryland, the US Army Interagency Communications Agency at Winchester, Virginia, the US Army Signal Radio Propagation Agency at Fort Monmouth, New Jersey, and the US Army Signal Communications Security Agency.

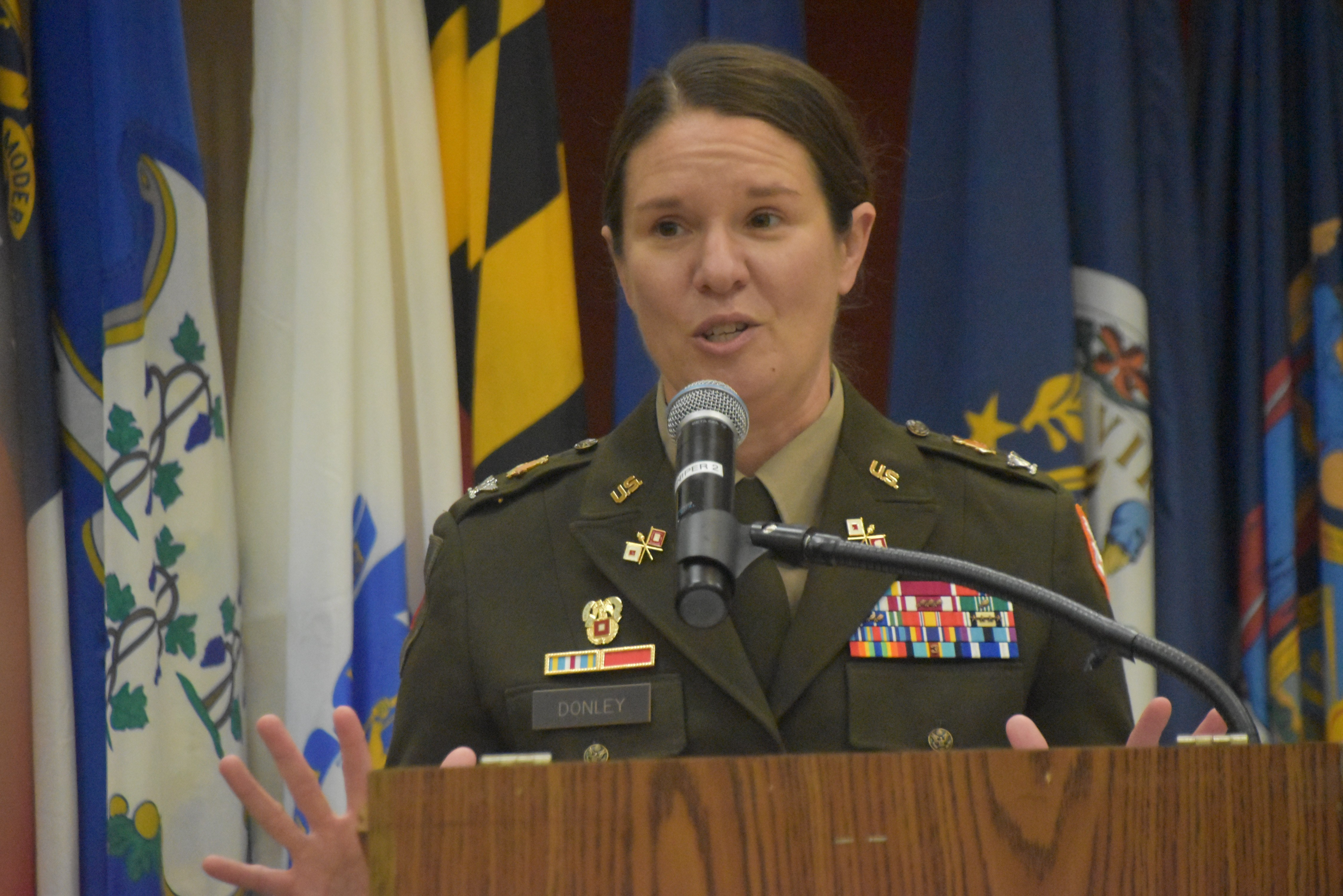
Colonel Julia M. Donley, 43rd chief of signal

=== Army regimental system organization (1986–present) ===
An aspect of the McNamara reorganization, the assignment of signal units to multiple commands instead of a single centralized Signal Corps, remains in force today. Over time, the Army came to believe that the loss of connection between signal troops in diverse commands hurt unit cohesion. To remedy this issue, the Army established the Signal Corps as a regiment on 1 June 1986. While the head of the regiment has been titled Chief Signal Officer and Chief of Signal, the position does not command the troops of the Signal Corps as the historic office once did. Instead, the head of the regiment is the proponent of all signal soldiers and organizations wherever assigned. The chief of signal is responsible for personnel and career planning, professional development, documenting the history and traditions of the Signal Corps, and for promoting pride and camaraderie among signal units. Since the regimental system was implemented, various positions have been designated as chief of signal. These include, the commander of the Army signal center, the commander of Fort Gordon, and the commandant of the Army Signal School. The current chief of signal is Colonel Julia M. Donley, commandant of the Army Signal School, who took office on 21 June 2024. Counting the pre-1964 officers, she is the 43rd head of the Signal Corps.

== List of Chief signal officers (1863–1964) ==
Image	Rank	Name	Begin date	End date	Notes
	Colonel	Albert J. Myer	29 April 1863	10 November 1863	Army Signal Corps established. Electric telegraphy removed from chief signal officer's responsibility.
	Lieutenant Colonel	William J. L. Nicodemus	15 November 1863	26 December 1864	In his annual report, a public document, Nicodemus revealed that the Union had broken Confederate telegraph codes. Secretary of War Stanton had him dismissed from the Army for this breach of security.
	Colonel	Benjamin F. Fisher	11 January 1865	15 November 1866	
	Brigadier General	Albert J. Myer	21 August 1867	24 August 1880	Electric telegraphy added to chief signal officer's responsibility. Weather reporting duties assigned, 15 March 1870. Died in office.
	Brigadier General	William B. Hazen	17 December 1880	16 January 1887	Found guilty and reprimanded in an 1885 court martial for his role in the International Polar Expedition. Died in office.
	Brigadier General	Adolphus W. Greely	3 March 1887	9 February 1906	The Weather Bureau was transferred to the Department of Agriculture 1 July 1891. Took control of telegraph networks in Cuba, Puerto Rico, and the Philippines in 1898. Returned them to new civilian governments in 1902, 1902, and 1907. Congress funds construction of Alaska Communications System, May 1900.
	Brigadier General	James Allen	10 February 1906	13 February 1913	Created the Aeronautical Division in 1907. Purchased the Army's first aircraft in 1909.
	Brigadier General	George P. Scriven	5 March 1913	13 February 1917	Congress assigns all military aviation to the chief signal officer, July 1914.
	Major General	George O. Squier	14 February 1917	31 December 1923	President Wilson removes military aviation from the chief signal officer by executive order 2862, May 1918. Tactical communications below the division level removed from the Signal Corps in 1922.
	Major General	Charles M. Saltzman	1 January 1924	8 January 1928	
	Major General	George S. Gibbs	9 January 1928	30 June 1931	Established Signal Intelligence Service.
	Major General	Irving J. Carr	1 July 1931	31 December 1934	
	Major General	James B. Allison	1 January 1935	30 September 1937	Military weather reporting transferred out of Signal Corps, 1 July 1937.
	Major General	Joseph O. Mauborgne	1 October 1937	30 September 1941	
	Major General	Dawson Olmstead	1 October 1941	30 June 1943	
	Major General	Harry C. Ingles	1 July 1943	31 March 1947	Signal Security Agency transferred to General Staff, January 1944. Development and purchasing of Air Corps electronics removed from chief signal officer, August 1944.
	Major General	Spencer B. Akin	1 April 1947	31 March 1951	
	Major General	George I. Back	2 May 1951	30 April 1955	
	Lieutenant General	James D. O'Connell	1 May 1955	30 April 1959	
	Major General	Ralph T. Nelson	1 May 1959	30 June 1962	
	Major General	Earle F. Cook	1 July 1962	30 June 1963	Transferred the Alaska Communications System to the U.S. Air Force.
	Major General	David P. Gibbs	1 July 1963	1 March 1964	
