= Irving J. Carr =

United States Army general

Chief Signal Officer, U.S. Army Irving J. Carr
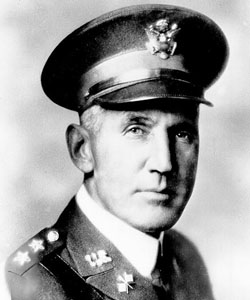
- Born: May 29, 1875; Chippewa Falls, Wisconsin, U.S.
- Died: June 12, 1963 (aged 88)
- Burial place: Arlington National Cemetery
- Military career
- Allegiance: United States of America
- Branch: United States Army
- Service years: 1897–1934
- Rank: Major general
- Commands: U.S. Signal Corps
- Conflicts: Philippine insurrection; Vera Cruz expedition; World War I
- Awards: Silver Star; Purple Heart

Irving J. Carr (May 29, 1875 – June 12, 1963) was a major general in the United States Army.

== Biography ==
Carr was born on May 29, 1875, in Chippewa Falls, Wisconsin. He married twice: first in 1912 to Margaret Lisle Halley, who died in 1932, and second in 1942 to Betty Guinn, who died in 1966. Carr died on June 12, 1963, in St. Petersburg, Florida. He, Margaret, and Betty are all buried together at Arlington National Cemetery.

== Career ==
Carr graduated from the Pennsylvania Military College in 1897. He was stationed in the Philippines first from 1899 to 1902, second again from 1903 to 1905, and third from 1909 to 1911. During World War I Carr served as a signal officer. Following the war his assignments included chief of staff of the Hawaiian Division, director of the Army Industrial College, executive to the Assistant Secretary of War, and Chief Signal Officer of the Army. His retirement was effective as of December 31, 1934.

Awards he received include the Silver Star and the Purple Heart.
