= George Sabin Gibbs =

United States general (1875–1947)

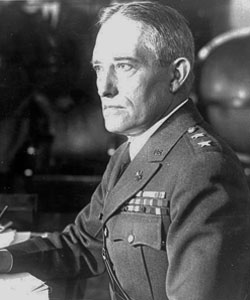
- Born: December 14, 1875; Harlan, Iowa, U.S.
- Died: January 8, 1947 (aged 71); Coral Gables, Florida, U.S.
- Burial place: Arlington National Cemetery
- Spouse: Ruth Hobby
- Children: 5
- Military career
- Allegiance: United States
- Branch: United States Army
- Service years: 1898–1931
- Rank: Major General
- Service number: 0-746
- Commands: U.S. Signal Corps
- Conflicts: Spanish–American War; Philippine Insurrection; World War I
- Awards: Distinguished Service Medal; Silver Star; Legion of Honour; Order of St Michael and St George; Order of the Crown (Belgium); Order of the Crown of Italy

George Sabin Gibbs (December 14, 1875 – January 8, 1947) was a United States Army officer. After serving as a brigadier general during World War I, he was promoted to major general and served as Chief Signal Officer for the Signal Corps.

== Early life ==
Gibbs was born in Harlan, Iowa, in 1875. He graduated from Harlan High School in 1892, from the State University of Iowa with a B.S. degree in 1897, and by 1901 had earned a M.S. degree in engineering.

== Early military career ==
In 1898, Gibbs enlisted in the Iowa Volunteer Infantry as a private. During the Spanish–American War and Philippine Insurrection, Gibbs served in the volunteer forces, mainly on Signal Corps duty, in ranks from private to first lieutenant. While a sergeant, Gibbs was cited for gallantry in action against the Spanish forces at Manila.

After being commissioned a first lieutenant in the Signal Corps, Regular Army, Gibbs' various duties included numerous surveys and construction of telegraph lines in Alaska and as chief Army signal officer of the Cuban Pacification.

== Later military career ==
During World War I, Gibbs was the assistant Chief Signal Officer of the American Expeditionary Forces. He received a temporary promotion to brigadier general on October 15, 1918. Gibbs was awarded the Distinguished Service Medal for his participation in the Aisne-Marne and Meuse-Argonne offensives. The citation for the medal reads:

The President of the United States of America, authorized by Act of Congress, July 9, 1918, takes pleasure in presenting the Army Distinguished Service Medal to Brigadier General George S. Gibbs, United States Army, for exceptionally meritorious and distinguished services to the Government of the United States, in a duty of great responsibility during World War I. As Assistant to the Chief Signal Officer, American Expeditionary Forces, much of the efficiency of the Signal Service in the zone of advance was due to General Gibbs' splendid ability and to his skill in handling the tactical and technical operations of the Signal Corps organizations attached to the service at the front.

He also received several foreign awards, including the Legion of Honour, Order of St Michael and St George, Order of the Crown of Belgium, and the Order of the Crown of Italy.

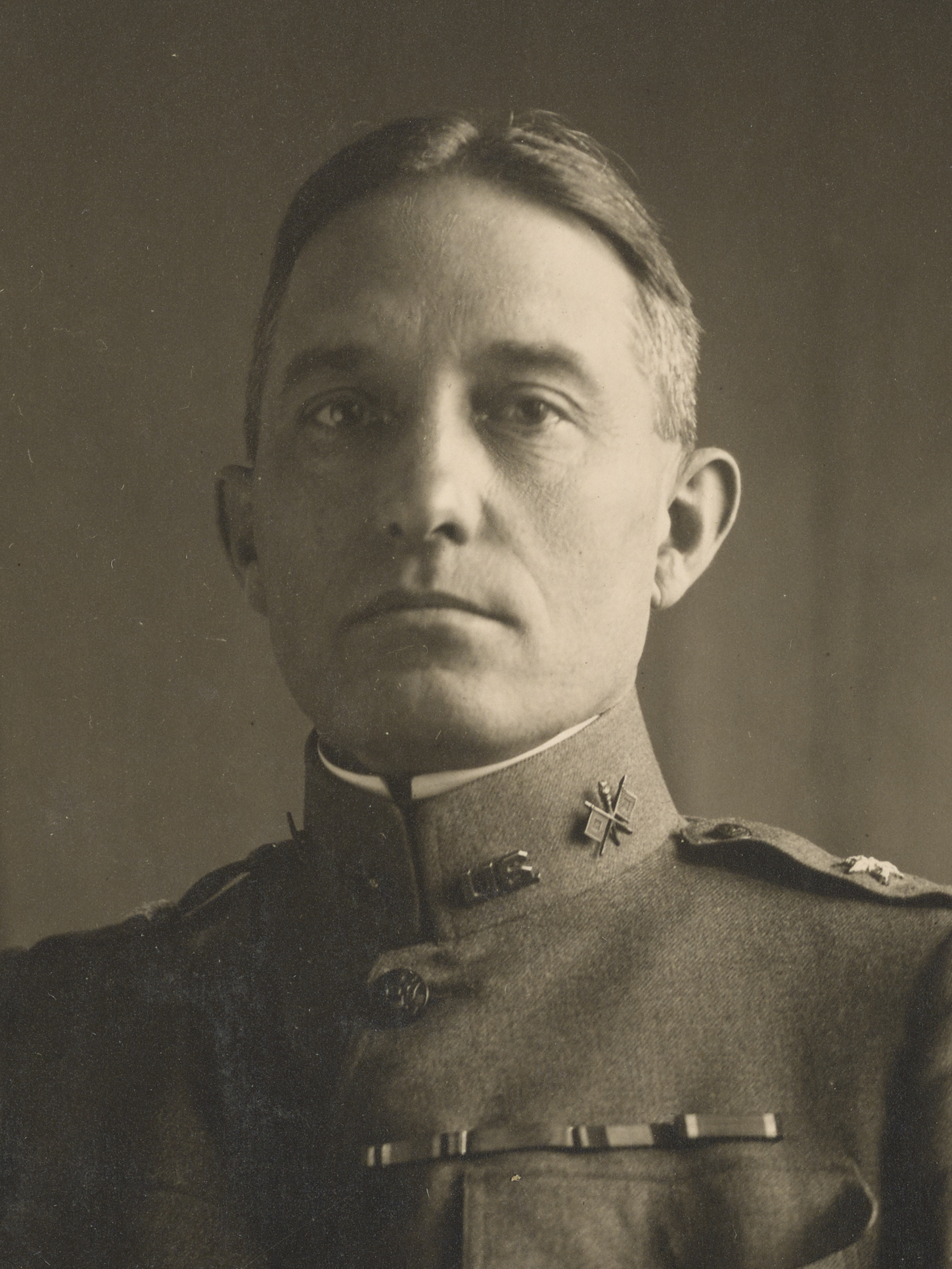
Brigadier General George Gibbs United States Army Signal Corps, American Expeditionary Force in Paris, France, 1918

After the war, Gibbs reverted to his permanent rank of lieutenant colonel on July 14, 1919, and graduated from United States Army War College in 1920. His post World War I assignments included duty on the War Department General Staff and executive officer to the Assistant Secretary of War. In 1924, he supervised the completion of the new Washington–Alaska cable.

Promoted to major general, Gibbs became Chief Signal Officer on January 19, 1928. He held this position until his retirement on June 30, 1931.

== Civilian career ==
After retirement, Gibbs was vice president of the International Telephone and Telegraph Company and in October 1931 president of the Postal Telegraph Cable Company. Later, in 1934, he served as vice chairman of the board and a director of the Federal Telephone and Radio Corporation.

== Death and legacy ==
Gibbs died on January 8, 1947, at Coral Gables, Florida. He was buried with full military honors in Section 3 of Arlington National Cemetery. His son David Parker Gibbs was a career army officer who attained the rank of major general and also served as head of the signal corps.

Gibbs' papers are at the Library of Congress.

== Bibliography ==
- "George Sabin Gibbs, Major General, United States Army". Arlington National Cemetery., which in turn was sourced from Coker, Kathy R., and Stokes, Carol E. A Concise History of The U.S. Army Signal Corps, p. 69, February 1991
- Marquis Who's Who (1975). Who Was Who In American History – The Military. Chicago, Illinois: Marquis Who's Who. ISBN 0837932017.
