= Attorney General Gibbs =

Attorney General Gibbs may refer to:

- George Couper Gibbs (1879–1946), Attorney General of Florida
- Ivan Gibbs (1927–2011), Attorney-General of Queensland
- Vicary Gibbs (1751–1820), Attorney General for England and Wales
