= James Dunne O'Connell =

United States Army general (1899–1984)

Chief Signal Officer, U.S. Army James Dunne O'Connell
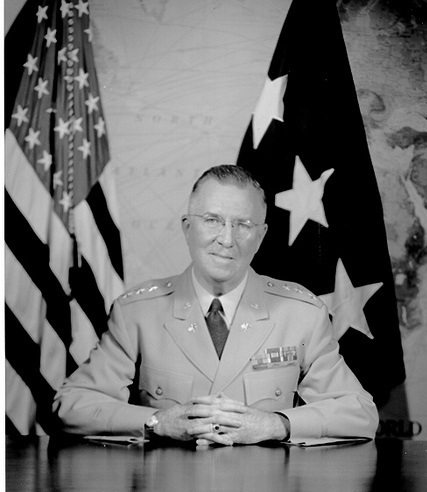
- O'Connell as Chief of the U.S. Army Signal Corps
- Born: 25 September 1899; Chicago, Illinois, US
- Died: 28 July 1984 (aged 84); Washington, D.C., US
- Burial place: Arlington National Cemetery
- Military career
- Allegiance: United States of America
- Branch: United States Army
- Service years: 1922–1959
- Rank: Lieutenant General
- Commands: Signal Corps Engineering Laboratories; United States Army Signal Corps
- Conflicts: World War II
- Awards: Distinguished Service Medal; Legion of Merit
- Other work: Vice President, General Telephone and Electronics Laboratories; Consultant, Stanford Research Institute; Special Assistant to the President for Telecommunications; Director of Telecommunications Management, Office of Emergency Planning

James Dunne O'Connell (25 September 1899 – 28 July 1984) was a United States Army Lieutenant General who was noteworthy for serving as Chief of the United States Army Signal Corps.

== Early life ==
O'Connell was born in Chicago, Illinois, on 25 September 1899. He was educated in Chicago, graduated from the United States Military Academy at West Point in 1922 and was commissioned a Second Lieutenant of infantry.

== Start of military career ==
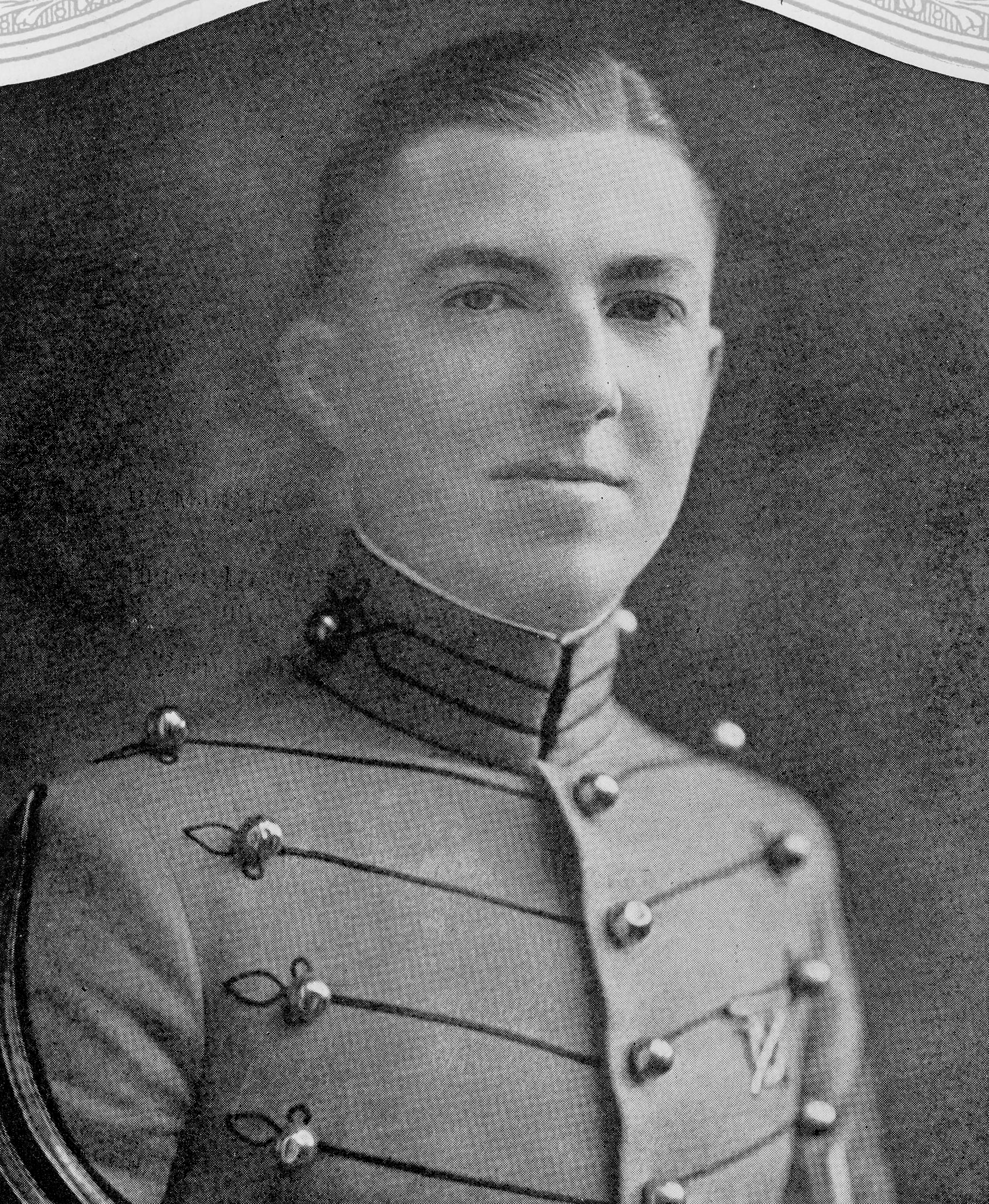
At West Point in 1922

After completing his initial infantry assignment, in 1925 O'Connell graduated from the Signal School at Camp Alfred Vail, New Jersey.

During the early 1920s he served as communications officer for the 35th Infantry Regiment at Schofield Barracks, Hawaii, and commanded a company in the 24th Infantry Regiment.

In 1928 O'Connell was assigned as an instructor at the Signal School. In 1930 he received a master's degree in communications engineering from Yale University.

O'Connell graduated from the Army's Command and General Staff College in 1937. He was then assigned to Fort Monmouth, New Jersey, first as a project officer and later as executive officer (second in command) of the Army's Signal Corps Laboratories.

== World War II ==
During World War II, O'Connell served initially in the Office of the Chief Signal Officer as head of the General Development Branch. He was then assigned as executive officer of the Signal Supply Service. O'Connell also served on the staff of the 12th Army Group in England, France and Germany.

== Post World War II ==
When the war ended, O'Connell returned to the United States as Chief of Engineering at the Signal Corps Engineering Laboratories at Fort Monmouth, which he subsequently commanded.

O'Connell served as Signal Officer of the Eighth Army in Japan from 1947 to 1948, afterwards serving as Chief Signal Officer of the Second Army.

From 1955 to 1959 O'Connell was assigned as the Army's Chief Signal Officer.

== Military retirement and awards ==
General O'Connell retired in 1959. His military awards included the Distinguished Service Medal and the Legion of Merit.

== Civilian career ==
After leaving the Army O'Connell was Vice President of the General Telephone and Electronics Laboratories in Palo Alto, California, for three years, and he spent two years as a consultant with the Stanford Research Institute and manager of its Washington, D.C., office.

O'Connell was a fellow of the Institute of Electrical and Electronics Engineers, and chaired its Joint Technical Advisory Committee from 1961 to 1964.

In 1964 O'Connell joined the staff of President Lyndon Johnson, serving until 1969 as Special Assistant to the President for Telecommunications and Director of Telecommunications Management in the Office of Emergency Planning.

== Retirement and death ==
After retiring from full-time employment in 1969, O'Connell resided in Bethesda, Maryland, and Boca Raton, Florida. From 1978 to 1982 he served on the Secretary of Commerce's Frequency Management Advisory Council. He died of cancer on 28 July 1984, at Walter Reed Hospital. General O'Connell was buried at Arlington National Cemetery on August 2, 1984.

== Personal life ==
In 1933 O'Connell married Edith Chase Scholosberg (born 1908), who died in 1965. He was survived by his second wife, Helen and two children, Peter D. O'Connell of Bethesda and Sally Ann O'Connell of Fairbanks, Alaska.
