= David Parker Gibbs =

United States Army general (1911–1987)

Chief Signal Officer, U.S. Army David Parker Gibbs
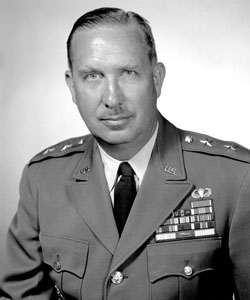
- Born: March 11, 1911; Fort Leavenworth, Kansas
- Died: August 30, 1987 (aged 76); Sierra Vista, Arizona
- Burial place: Fort Huachuca Cemetery
- Military career
- Allegiance: United States of America
- Branch: United States Army
- Service years: 1933–1966
- Rank: Major General
- Commands: U.S. Signal Corps; Signal Training Center
- Conflicts: World War II; Korean War
- Awards: Distinguished Service Medal; Legion of Merit; Croix de Guerre; Bronze Star Medal (3)

Major General David P. Gibbs (March 11, 1911 – August 30, 1987) was a United States Army General. He graduated from West Point as a second lieutenant in 1933. A career soldier in the Signal Corps, he became Chief of Communications-Electronics in the Department of the Army Staff, a position formerly called "Chief Signal Officer". He earned the Distinguished Service Medal, the Legion of Merit, the Croix de Guerre (War Cross) and the Bronze Star with two Oak Leaf Clusters.

== Career ==
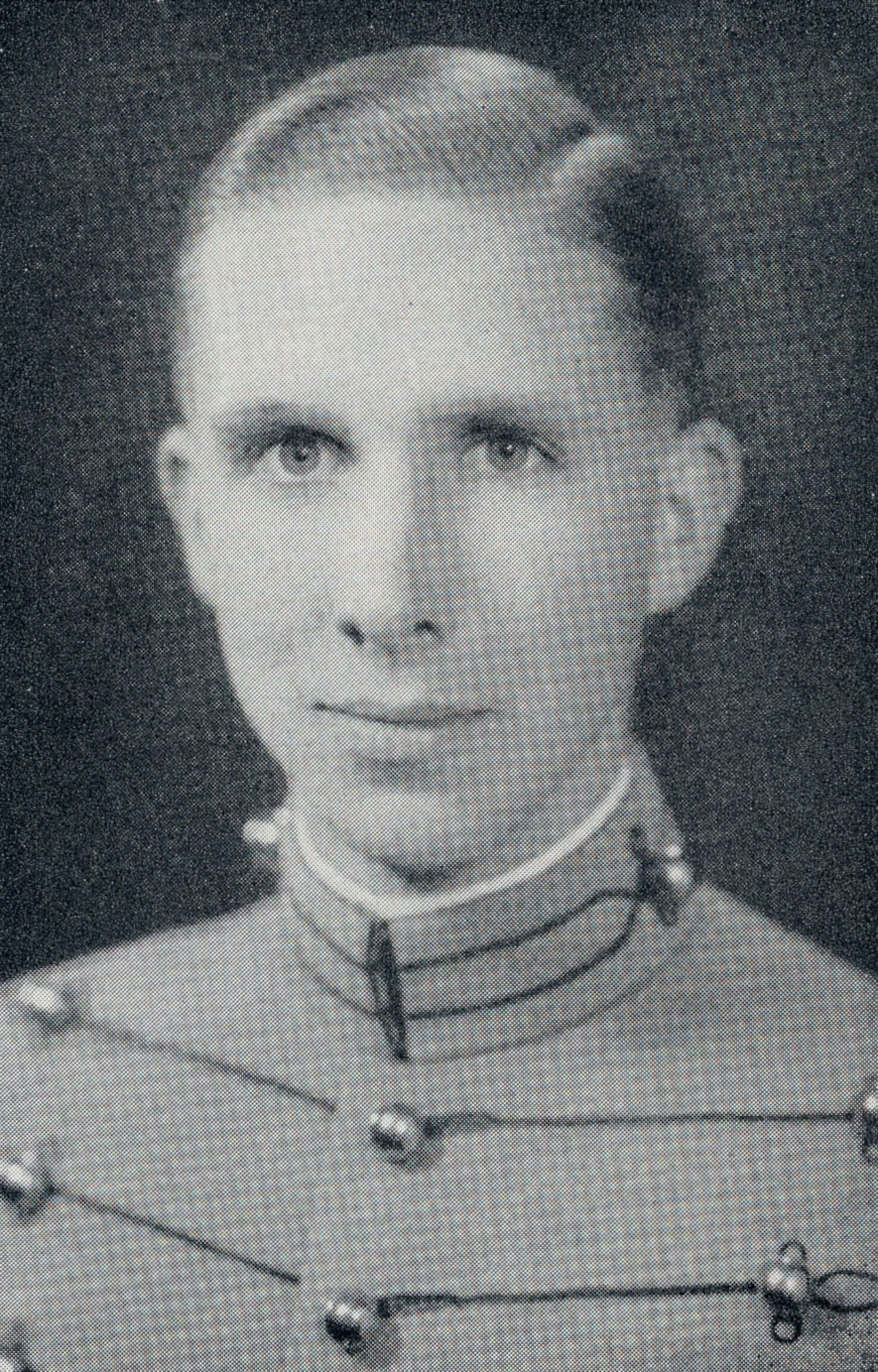
Gibbs as a United States Military Academy cadet c. 1933

A 1933 graduate of the United States Military Academy, Gibbs began his career by serving at Fort Bliss, Texas with the 1st Cavalry F Division's 1st Signal Troop and with the Hawaiian Division's 11th Signal Company. During the Second World War, he served in various postings in Europe. He returned to the United States to command 1st Signal Service Group at Camp Polk, Louisiana and then was promoted to command the 51st Signal Operations Battalion at Fort Meade, Maryland, and then served as a staff officer in Washington. Gibbs graduated from the Air War College in 1948 and the National War College in 1953.

He followed these stateside postings with postings to Korea and Japan from 1953 to 1955. In 1955, he was Chief Signal Officer at Headquarters, Continental Army Command (now the Training and Doctrine Command - TRADOC) as a brigadier general and then commanding officer of the Signal Training Center at Fort Gordon, and Chief of Staff for Communications and Electronics, Headquarters, North American Defense Command Center. He was promoted to major general and advanced from first assistant to Chief Signal Officer in 1963, a position held by his father George Sabin Gibbs from 1928 to 1931. Gibbs retired from active duty in 1966.

Major General Gibbs died in August 1987. He was interred at Fort Huachuca Cemetery in Sierra Vista, Arizona.
