= List of people from West Chester, Pennsylvania =

The borough of West Chester, Pennsylvania, was established in 1762 and incorporated in 1799. The population in the 2010 census was 18,461. Notable residents or those who were born in West Chester are listed below.

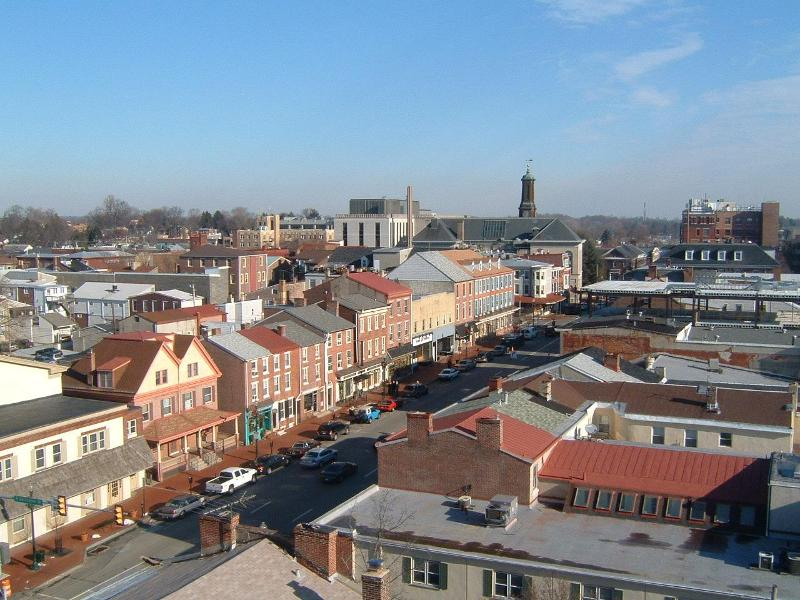
West Chester Downtown Historic District

== Academics, science, and literature ==
- Ellen Starr Brinton (1886–1954), Quaker peace activist, civil rights activist, and feminist
- Howard Brinton (1884–1973), director of Pendle Hill Quaker Center for Study and Contemplation
- Gilbert Cope (1840–1928), historian and genealogist
- James David Corrothers (1869–1917), African American poet and minister
- Benjamin Matlack Everhart (1818–1904), mycologist
- John Russell Hayes (1866–1945), Quaker poet and librarian
- Joseph Hergesheimer (1880–1954), novelist
- Josiah Hoopes (1832–1904), botanist and nurseryman
- William W. Jefferis (1820–1906), mineralogist and banker
- Charles Glen King (1896–1988), biochemist, pioneer in nutrition research
- Bruce Larkin (born 1957), children's book author
- Charlton Thomas Lewis (1834–1904), lawyer and classical lexicographer
- Joseph J. Lewis (1801–1883), U.S. tax commissioner and biographer of Abraham Lincoln
- Clara Marshall (1847–1931), physician, educator, and dean of the Woman's Medical College of Pennsylvania
- Henry McBride (1867–1962), art critic and author
- Thomas Harrison Montgomery Jr. (1873–1912), zoologist and cell biologist
- George Foot Moore (1851–1931), scholar of the Bible, Judaism, and comparative religions
- G. Raymond Rettew (1903–1973), chemist who pioneered the mass production of penicillin
- Joseph Rothrock (1839–1922), botanist and environmentalist
- George Escol Sellers (1808–1899), inventor; attended private school in West Chester as a child
- Bayard Taylor (1825–1878), poet, novelist, and travel writer
- David Townsend (1787–1858), botanist and banker
- Mary Schäffer Warren (1861–1939), American-Canadian explorer and botanical illustrator
- William H. Whyte (1917–1999), sociologist
- Alycia Weinberger (Born 1970), Astronomer

== Art ==
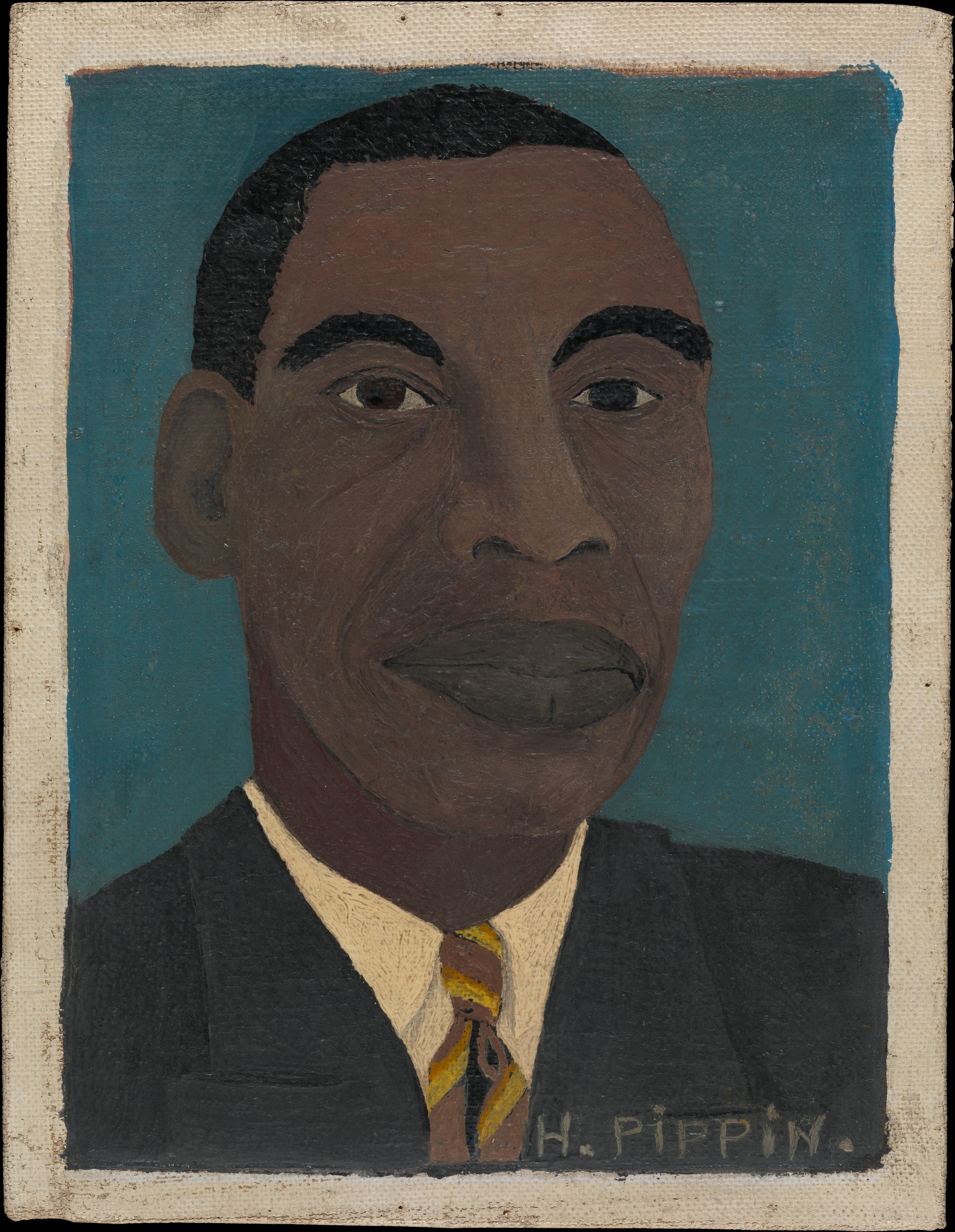
Horace Pippin - "Self Portrait"

- Tom Bostelle (1925–2005), painter and sculptor
- George Cope (1855–1929), painter
- Philip Jamison (1925–2021), watercolor artist
- Horace Pippin (1888–1946), painter
- Barclay Rubincam (1920–1978), painter
- T. Roney Williamson (1852–1896), architect

== Entertainment ==
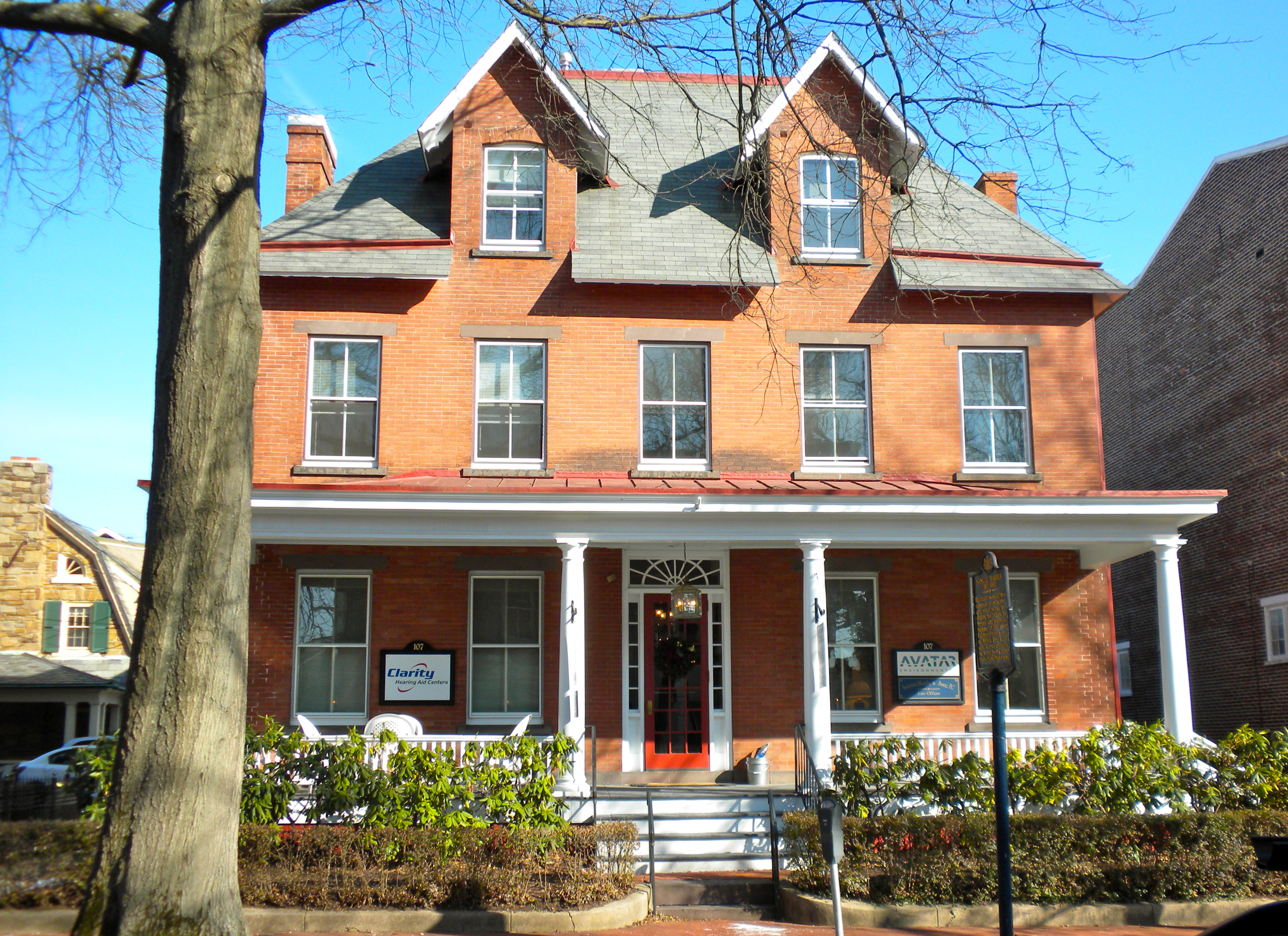
Boyhood home of Samuel Barber in West Chester

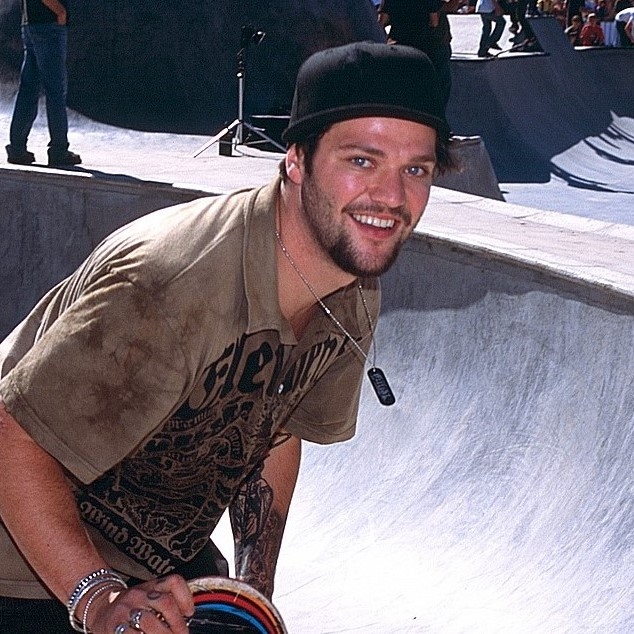
Bam Margera

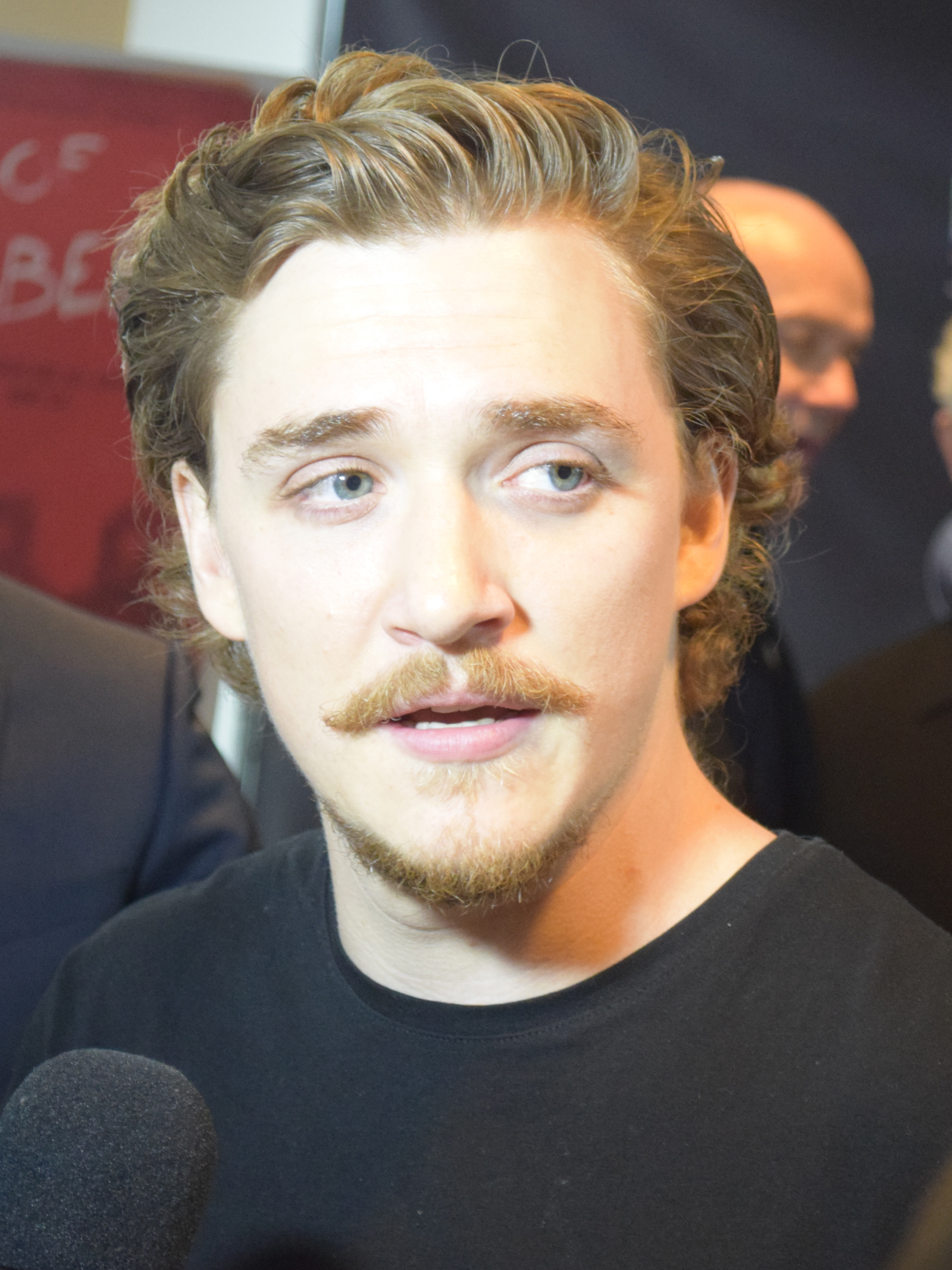
Kyle Gallner

- Aquaria (b. 1996), drag queen, winner of RuPaul's Drag Race, Season 10
- Samuel Barber (1910–1981), composer
- CKY, rock band
- CKY crew, group of skateboarders and stuntmen
- Brandon DiCamillo, reality television personality
- Ryan Dunn, reality television personality
- Kyle Gallner, actor
- John Lilley (b. 1954), guitarist for The Hooters
- April Margera, reality television personality
- Bam Margera, professional skateboarder and television personality
- Jess Margera, drummer
- Phil Margera, reality television personality
- Vincent Margera, "Don Vito", reality television personality
- Matisyahu, rapper and singer
- Charlie McDermott, actor
- Matthew McGrory, actor
- Chris Raab, reality television personality
- Graham Rogers, actor
- Kerr Smith, actor
- Amy Steel, actress
- Morgan Turner, actress
- Noel Jan Tyl, opera singer and astrologer
- Rake Yohn, reality television personality
- Zeeko Zaki, actor
- Richard Zobel, actor

== Politics, government, military, and law ==
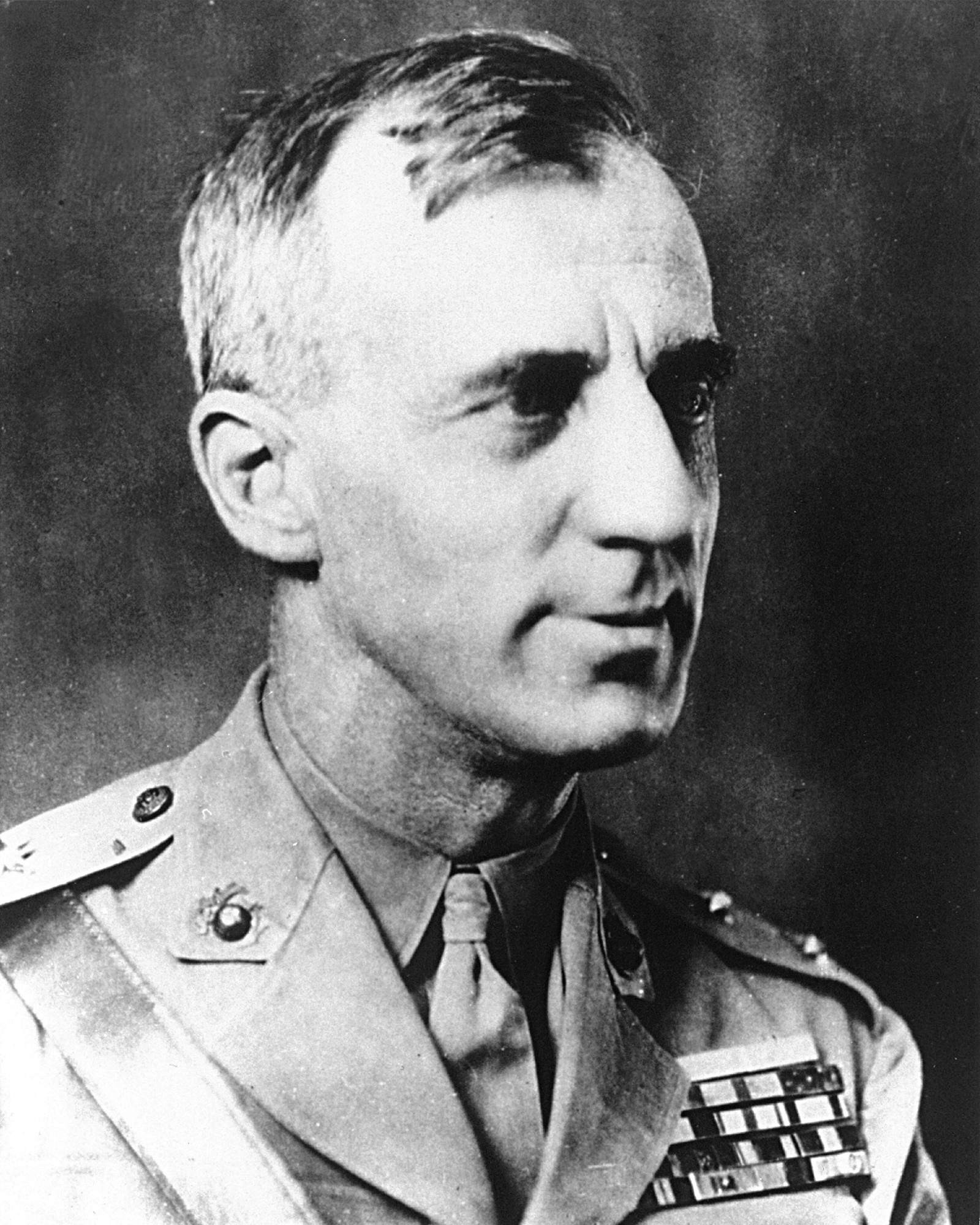
Smedley Butler

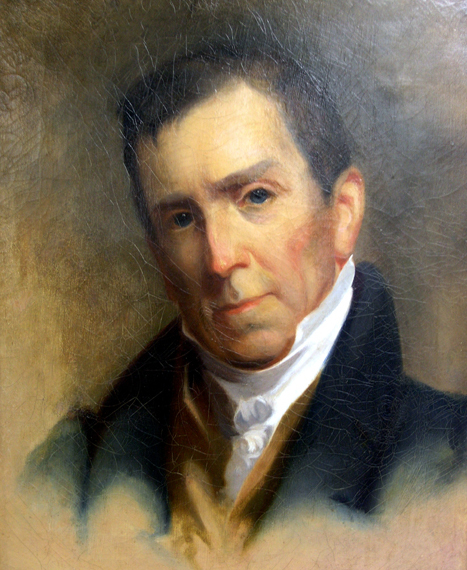
William Darlington

- Isaac D. Barnard (1791–1834), U.S. Senator for Pennsylvania, Pennsylvania State Senator
- Harry W. Bass (1866–1917), first African American member of the Pennsylvania House of Representatives
- Thomas S. Bell (1800–1861), Pennsylvania State Senator and justice of the Pennsylvania Supreme Court
- Thomas S. Bell Jr. (1838–1862), Union Army lieutenant colonel killed in action at the Battle of Antietam
- William Hemphill Bell (1834–1906), US Army brigadier general
- Smedley Butler (1881–1940), U.S. Marine Corps, two-time Medal of Honor recipient and anti-war activist
- Henry Conner (1837–1918), Union Army officer and member of the Wisconsin State Senate
- Robert Cornwell (1835–1927), Union Army captain and law partner of William Darlington
- Isabel Darlington (1865–1950), lawyer and the first woman to practice law in Chester County
- William Darlington (1782–1863), botanist and United States House of Representatives member
- Columbus Evans (1824–1854), newspaper editor, soldier, and mayor of Wilmington, Delaware
- James Bowen Everhart (1821–1888), U.S. House of Representatives member, Pennsylvania state senator
- William Everhart (1785–1868), U.S. House of Representatives member
- J. Smith Futhey (1820–1888), Pennsylvania state judge and historian
- Henry Ruhl Guss (1825–1907), Union Army brevet Major General
- John Hannum III (1744–1799), militia colonel in the American Revolutionary War
- Josiah Harlan (1799-1871), author, explorer, first American in Afghanistan, probably basis for Kipling's "The Man who Would Be King"
- Joseph Hemphill (1770–1842), U.S. Congressman, practiced law in West Chester
- Moses Hepburn (1832–1897), first African American town councilor of West Chester
- John Hickman (1810–1875), U.S. Congressman
- Wilmer W. MacElree (1859–1960), lawyer, Chester County district attorney, author of Along the Western Brandywine
- Mott Hooton (1838–1920), U.S. Army brigadier general; veteran of the Civil War and Spanish–American War
- Herman Hutt (1872–1952), Pennsylvania state representative and chief burgess of West Chester
- Francis James (1799–1886), U.S. Congressman and chief burgess of West Chester
- William Levis James (1833–1903), Union Army brevet Brigadier General
- Kadida Kenner, founder and CEO of the New Pennsylvania Project
- Walter T. Kerwin Jr. (1917–2008), United States Army four-star general
- Charles Edwin King (1849–1862), youngest confirmed soldier to die during the American Civil War
- Dewitt Clinton Lewis (1822–1899), Union Army soldier and Medal of Honor recipient
- Henry McIntire (1835–1863), Union Army lieutenant colonel
- Charles R. Miller (1857–1927), 54th governor of Delaware
- Jonathan Lee Riches (born 1976), lawyer and fraudster
- David M. Rodriguez (born 1954), U.S. Army four-star general
- George Fairlamb Smith (1840–1877), Union Army colonel, state representative, and district attorney
- Wolfe Tone (1763–1798), Irish Republican who lived briefly in West Chester in the 1790s
- Washington Townsend (1813–1894), U.S. House of Representatives member
- Nicholas Trist (1800–1874), diplomat who negotiated the Treaty of Guadalupe Hidalgo
- Cristin McCarthy Vahey, member of the Connecticut House of Representatives
- Wilmer Worthington (1804–1873), physician and Speaker of the Pennsylvania State Senate in 1869

== Sports ==
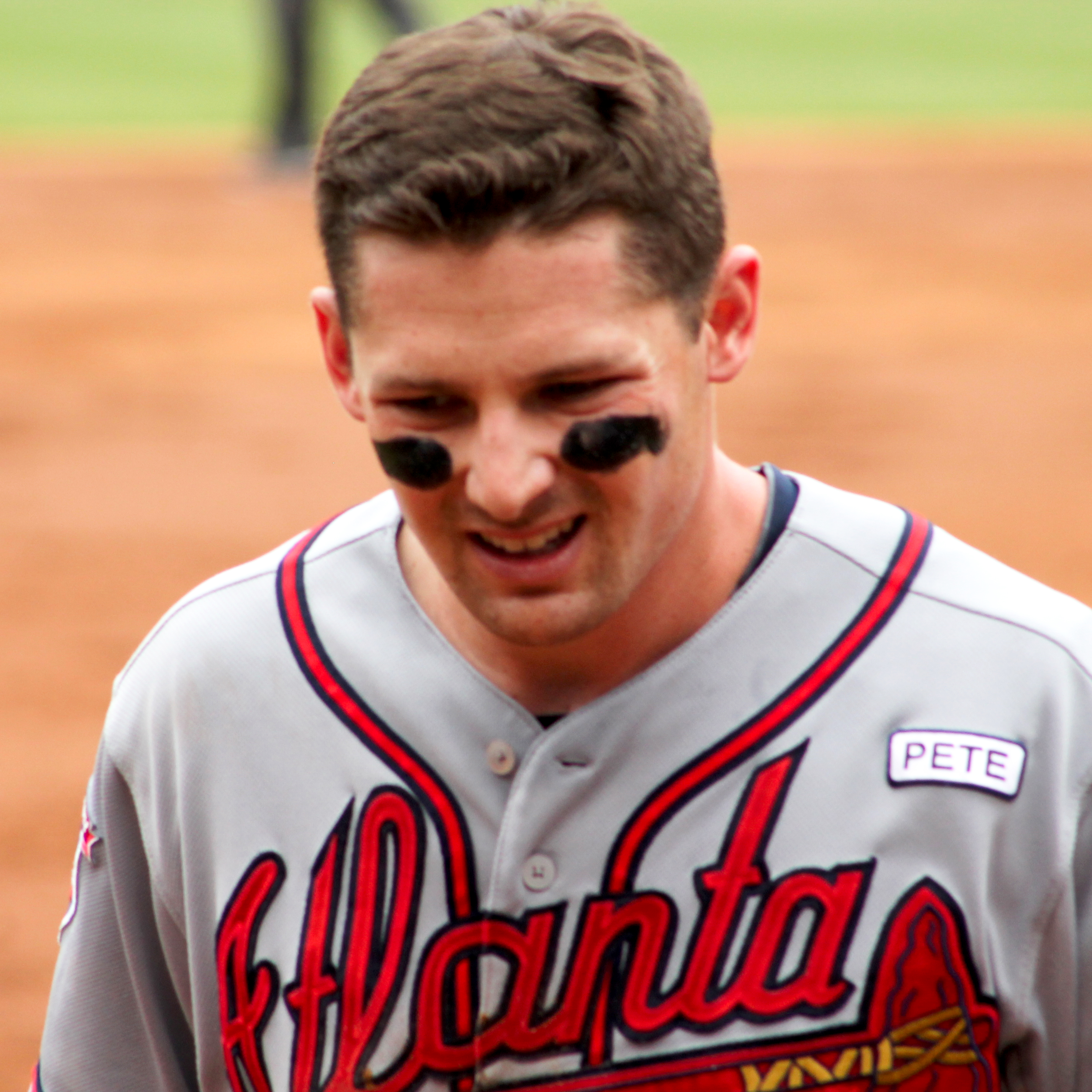
Phillip Gosselin

- Eric Bernotas (b. 1981), skeleton athlete, coach and double Winter Olympian
- Norman Braman (b. 1932), former owner of NFL's Philadelphia Eagles
- Al Bruno (1927–2014), football player and coach
- Stephen Dennis (b. 1987), basketball player for Bnei Herzliya of the Israeli Basketball Premier League
- Jack Fritz, college baseball player and radio personality for WIP-FM
- Jim Furyk, professional golfer, 2003 U.S. Open champion
- Phil Gosselin, Major League baseball player
- Brandon Guyer, Major League Baseball player
- Will Howard (born 2001), NFL quarterback for the Pittsburgh Steelers
- Jeff Larentowicz, professional soccer player
- Jim Liberman, auto racing driver
- Dereck Lively II, NBA player
- Jon Matlack, Major League Baseball pitcher
- Chas McCormick (born 1995), baseball player
- Aiden McFadden (born 1998), soccer player
- Muffet McGraw, women's basketball coach, 2001 NCAA champion, member of Basketball Hall of Fame
- Chris McMahon (born 1999), Major League Baseball pitcher
- Bridget Namiotka (born 1990), pair skater
- Carl Nassib, National Football League defensive end
- Ryan Nassib, National Football League quarterback
- Brandon Novak, professional skateboarder
- Sean O'Hair, professional golfer
- Kevin Orie, Major League Baseball player
- Glen Osbourne, professional wrestler
- Matt Schaub, National Football League quarterback
- Bud Sharpe, Major League Baseball player
- Lawrence Shields, runner, Olympic bronze medalist

== Other ==
- Nick Berg (1978–2004), repairman beheaded in Iraq
- Ralph E. Brock (1881–1959), forester and gardener
- Hannah M. Darlington (1808–1890), activist
- William B. Gibbs Jr. (1905–1984), educator
- Emma Hunter (1831–1904), telegraph operator
- Anna Jarvis (1864–1948), founder of Mother's Day holiday in the United States
- Aimee Olexy, restaurateur who, with Stephen Starr, owns The Love, Talula's Table, and Talula's Garden, all in Philadelphia
- Uriah Hunt Painter (1837–1900), journalist and lobbyist
- Bayard Rustin (1912–1987), civil rights activist
- Philip M. Sharples (1857–1944), inventor and industrialist
- Mary Ingram Stille (1854–1935), historian, journalist, and temperance reformer
- Geralyn Wolf (born 1947), Episcopal bishop
- Edwin D. Woolley (1807–1881), Mormon pioneer and businessman
