= West Chester B-25 crash =

1944 air crash in West Chester, Pennsylvania, United States

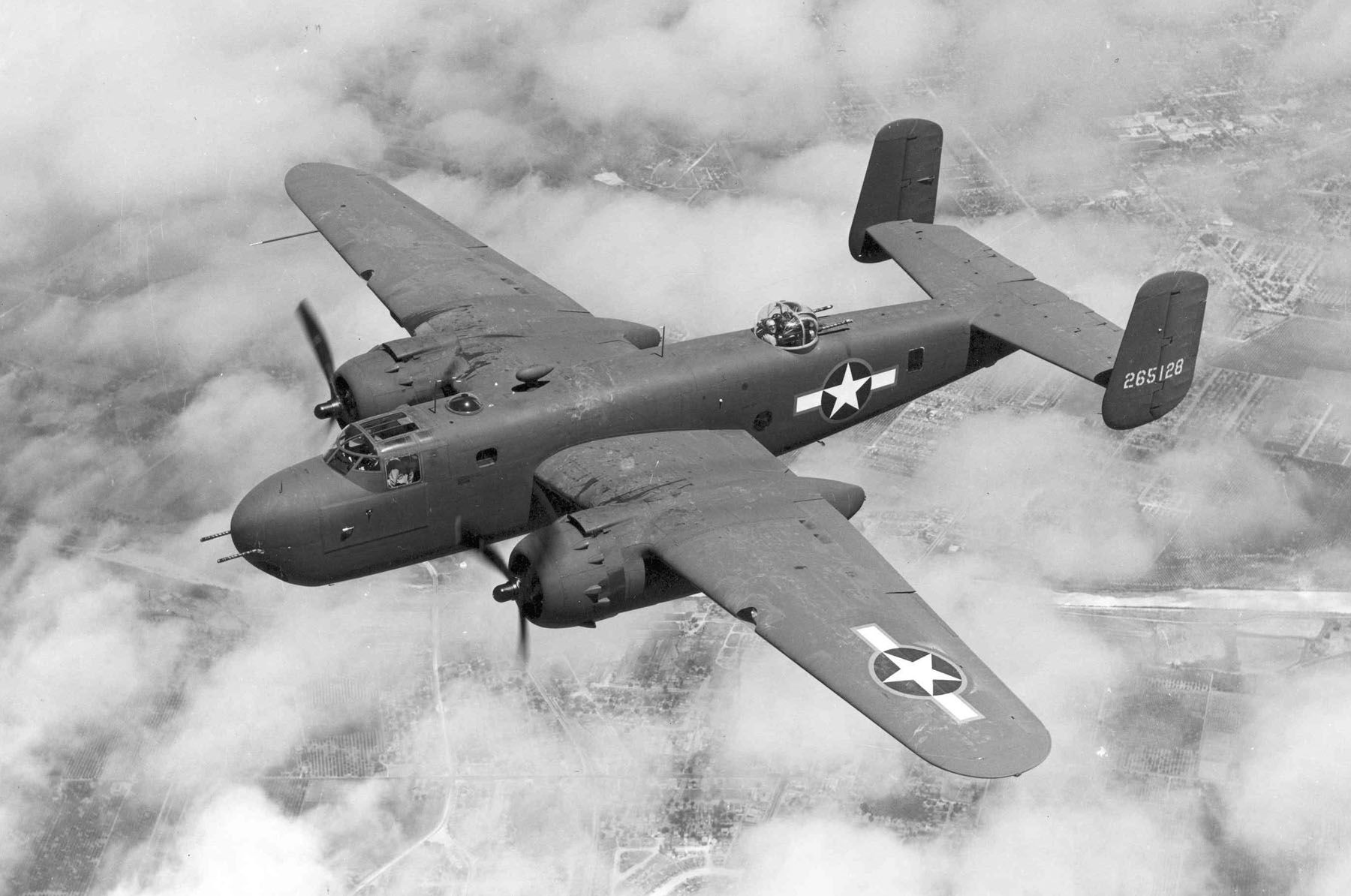
- A similar B-25G bomber

Accident
- Date: May 7, 1944 (82 years ago)
- Summary: Crashed into ground due to engine failure and inclement weather (rain and hail squall)
- Site: Oaklands Cemetery, West Goshen Township, Pennsylvania, U.S.
- Total fatalities: 7

Aircraft
- Aircraft type: B-25 Mitchell bomber
- Operator: United States Army Air Force
- Registration: 42-64760
- Flight origin: Newark, New Jersey, U.S.
- Destination: Kissimmee, Florida, U.S.
- Passengers: 3
- Crew: 4
- Fatalities: 7
- Survivors: 0

On May 7, 1944, a United States Army Air Force B-25 bomber crashed and exploded around one mile (1.6 km) north of West Chester, Pennsylvania, killing all seven military passengers and crew members on board. Caught in stormy weather, the plane nose-dived into the woods at Oaklands Cemetery and burst into flames.

== Crash ==
Assigned to Squadron 908BU of the U.S. Army Air Force, a B-25G bomber (tail number 42-64760) departed Newark, New Jersey, at 4:04 p.m. local time on a routine training flight to an Army airbase in Kissimmee, Florida. The four crew members were accompanied by three passengers, all airmen hitching rides to their home bases. The two officers and five enlisted men on board were members of the U.S. Army Air Force.

Circa 4:40 p.m. local time, the B-25 was overflying West Chester, Pennsylvania, when it encountered a squall, with rain, hail, and heavy cloud cover reported. Residents reported that the plane "seemed to stop in midflight," began spiraling downward, and nose-dived into the ground, where it exploded into flames, producing an impact crater seven to ten feet deep. One eyewitness reported that one of the plane's two engines caught fire prior to impact. Part of the fuselage was found 500 yards from the crash, and numerous small brush fires sprang up because of burning fuel that the impact scattered over a wide area. Investigators attributed the crash to engine failure caused by stormy weather. The crash occurred circa 4:45 p.m. in the woods at the Oaklands Cemetery, around one and a half miles north of West Chester, Pennsylvania.

Two airmen bailed out, but they were too close to the ground for their parachutes to open fully. Rescuers found their bodies on a hill about 200 yards from the crash site. One was dangling from a tree. Three other fatalities were ejected from the plane on or just before impact. The two remaining victims, including the pilot, were trapped inside the aircraft. Their bodies were burned beyond recognition. According to the Associated Press, bodies were "strewn over the cemetery" and "so mangled that identification was difficult."

All seven men on board died on impact. The crew consisted of 2nd Lt. Herman H. Haas Jr. (pilot), 2nd Lt. William C. Bethel (co-pilot), Sgt. Sylvio W. Pollender (radio operator), and Sgt. John T. Donahue, engineer. Passengers Staff Sgt. Joseph Tucek, Sgt. George B. Allen, and Pvt. Edward P. Geoghegan Jr. also died. Victims came from five states: Haas from Lansdowne, Pennsylvania; Donahue from Seward, Pennsylvania; Bethel from Miami, Florida; Allen from Tampa, Florida; Tucek from Long Island; Pollender from Holyoke, Massachusetts; and Geoghegan from Greensboro, North Carolina. A cemetery memorial gives Geoghegan the rank of sergeant. Newspapers reported no injuries on the ground.

== Aftermath ==
Firefighters, ambulances, state police, and army personnel responded to the scene. As many as ten thousand onlookers (West Chester's population was only thirteen thousand at the time), rapidly converged on the crash site, crowded into the cemetery, and blocked the main road leading to the crash. First responders struggled to reach the scene due to the crowds. Motorists thronging the Pottstown Pike blocked two of four fire companies from West Chester from reaching the scene. The chaos forced at least one fire engine, from the Good Will Fire Company, into a ditch, though no firefighters were injured. Soldiers from an airbase in New Castle County, Delaware, along with state police, finally cleared the cemetery and herded onlookers down the pike a quarter of a mile from the wreckage. Once firefighters reached the scene, they battled the fires for over an hour before extinguishing them.

== Memorial ==
Oaklands Cemetery is home to a memorial to the soldiers who died in the crash. The large black granite monument bears the men's names and ranks and an image of their aircraft. The West Chester Men's Service Club and the West Chester Veterans Council dedicated the memorial on May 7, 1995.
