= Oaklands Cemetery =

Rural cemetery in West Chester, Pennsylvania, USA

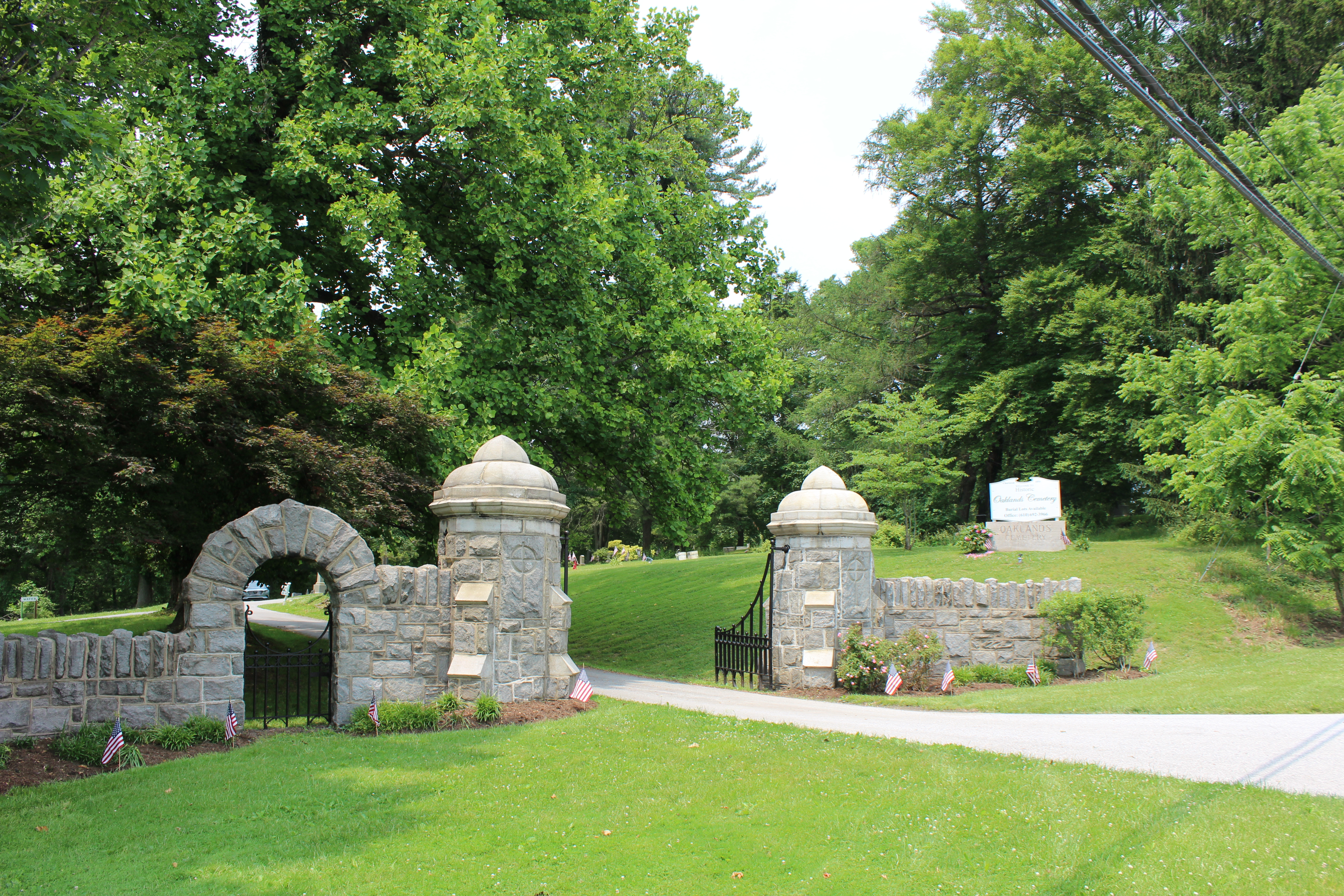
- Oaklands Cemetery Gates
- Interactive map of Oaklands Cemetery

Details
- Established: 1854
- Location: 1042 Pottstown Pike, West Chester, Pennsylvania
- Country: United States
- Coordinates: 39.9799°N 75.6213°W
- Type: Historic
- Style: Rural cemetery
- Size: 26 acres (11 ha)
- Website: oaklandscemetery.com
- Find a Grave: Oaklands Cemetery

Oaklands Cemetery is a rural cemetery founded in 1854 in West Goshen Township, Pennsylvania. It is located at 1042 Pottstown Pike and is approximately 26 acres (0.11 km^{2}) in size.

== Description and history ==
The Oaklands Cemetery was founded in response to the West Chester borough council's closure of graveyards within the borders of West Chester and the discontinuation of future burials allowed within it. The ordinance passed on July 21, 1851, and had an effective date of August 20. It was enacted most likely in reaction to cholera epidemics in town. The Pennsylvania General Assembly passed, and Governor William F. Johnston approved, an act to incorporate the cemetery on April 14, 1851.

The corporators included some of West Chester's most prominent politicians and businessmen, including Robert Cornwell, William Darlington, William Everhart, Joseph J. Lewis, and Washington Townsend. The corporation raised money through contributions by prominent citizens and purchased 23 acres of land from Joseph L. Taylor located one and a half miles north of West Chester for the cemetery.

The Oaklands Cemetery was dedicated on December 10, 1853. Samuel Rush, a noted lawyer, delivered the principal address, and George W. Pearce wrote the dedication ode. Bodies from the closed borough cemeteries were reburied at Oaklands the following year, along with the start of new burials. Burials grew so slowly that in July 1854, Darlington proposed that the remains of Isaac D. Barnard, a U.S. Senator and War of 1812 hero, be moved to Oaklands to bolster interest in burials there. Barnard's remains were exhumed, transported to Oaklands in a grand procession, and interred beneath a newly erected marble obelisk while Darlington gave a speech lauding Barnard's deeds and the "beautiful rural repository of the dead" where he now lay. Interest in the cemetery rose as a result, and by their 1855 annual meeting, the incorporators could boast of fifty-two burials, including thirty-six transfers from other graveyards.

As burials increased, the incorporators laid roads, created a small lake, and built a receiving vault, sexton's cottage, and stone gateway for the new cemetery. By 1888, the cemetery featured an ornamental fountain as well as a chapel atop a slight rise called Chapel Hill. Towering trees and winding paths made this garden cemetery "one of the most attractive places in the vicinity," according to the state board of trade.

A memorial at the cemetery commemorates the seven crewmembers and passengers who died when their B-25 bomber crashed in a forested area of the cemetery on May 7, 1944.

== Adjacent cemeteries ==
In 1862, additional land was purchased as an annex for the burial of African American decedents. The Chestnut Grove Cemetery Company was incorporated to manage this property on October 27, 1862. It is now the Chestnut Grove Cemetery Annex and as of 1910 consisted of ten acres of land owned and managed by African American residents. DeBaptiste Funeral Home managed the property as of 2013. Painter Horace Pippin, politician Harry W. Bass, and forester Ralph E. Brock are among the interments there.

A portion of Oaklands Cemetery was allotted for Roman Catholic burials. This section became St. Agnes Cemetery, adjoining the Oaklands Cemetery on the north.

An Orthodox Friends cemetery was established across the street from Oaklands in 1874. Arctic explorer Isaac Israel Hayes and Chester County historian Gilbert Cope are among the interments there.

== Notable burials ==
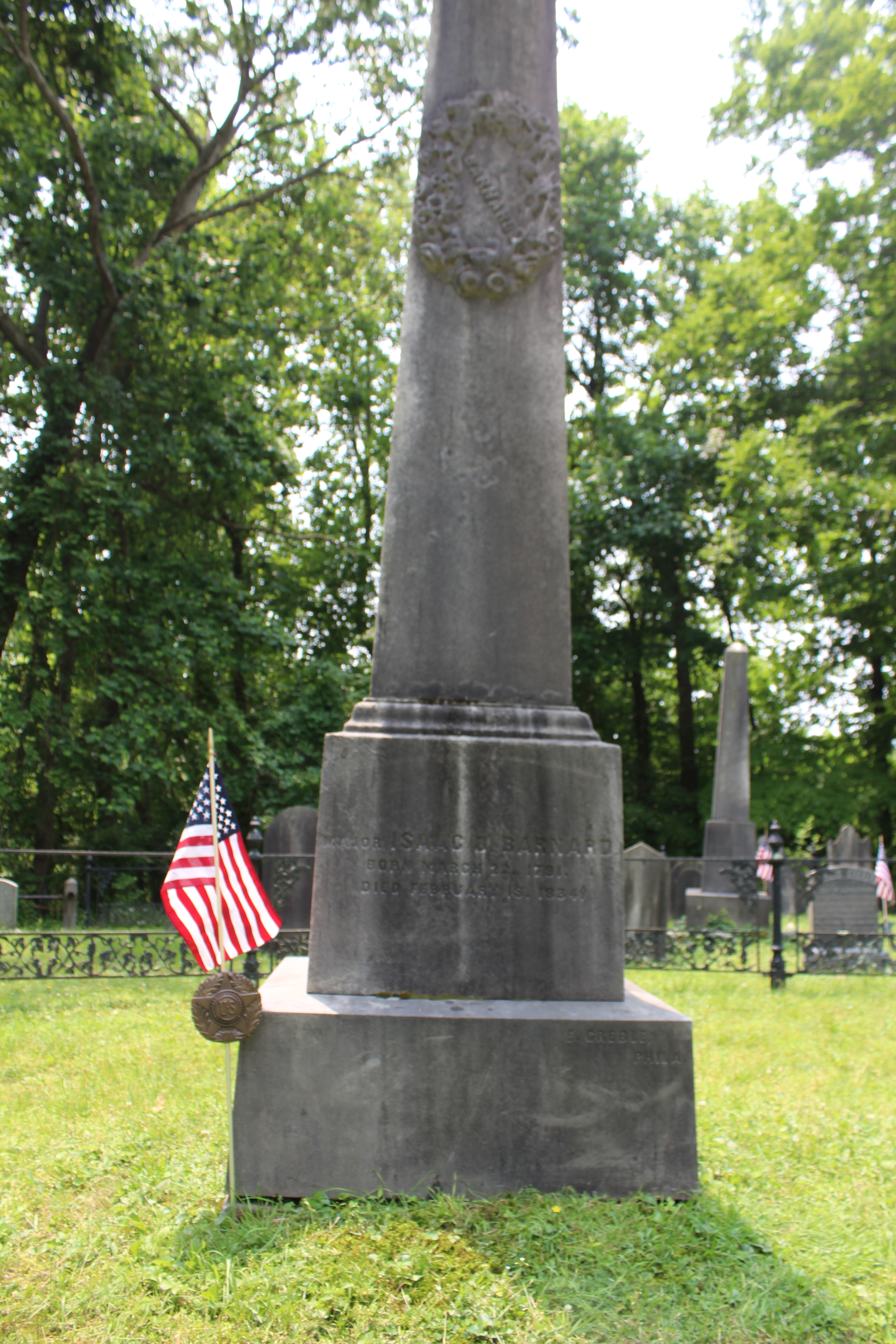
Isaac Dutton Barnard Memorial

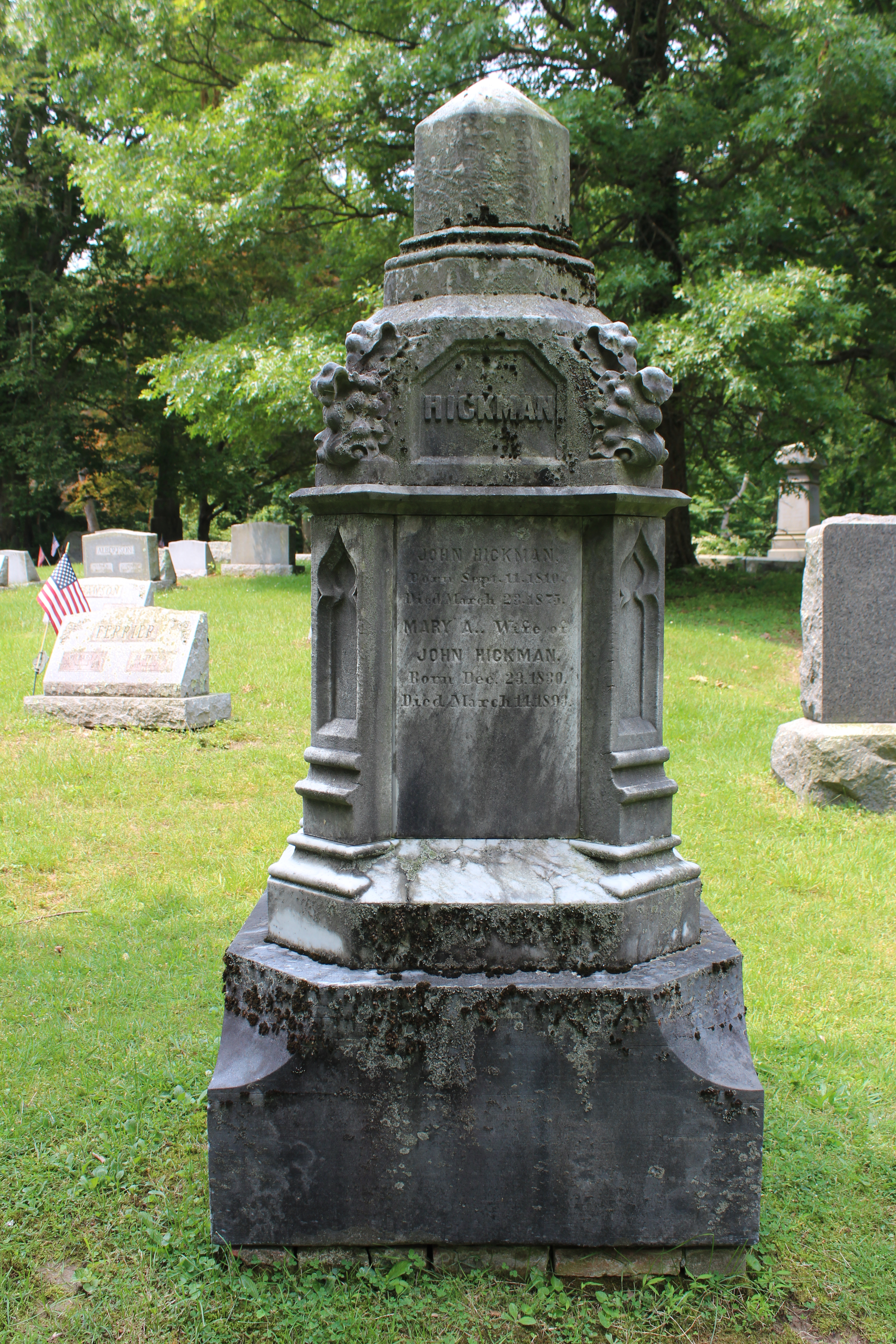
John Hickman gravestone

- Samuel Barber (1910–1981), composer best known for his Adagio for Strings and the opera Vanessa
- Isaac Dutton Barnard (1791–1834), United States Senator
- Thomas S. Bell (1800–1861), Pennsylvania State Senator and justice of the Supreme Court of Pennsylvania
- Thomas S. Bell Jr. (1838–1862), Union Army lieutenant colonel killed in action at the Battle of Antietam
- Joseph Emley Borden (1854–1929), Major League Baseball pitcher
- Samuel Butler (1825–1891), Pennsylvania State Representative and Pennsylvania Treasurer (1880–1882)
- Smedley Darlington Butler (1881–1940), United States Marine Corps General, double recipient of the Medal of Honor, and exposer of the Business Plot to overthrow President Franklin D. Roosevelt
- Thomas Stalker Butler (1855–1928), United States Representative from 1897 to 1928
- William Butler (1822–1909), judge of the United States District Court for the Eastern District of Pennsylvania
- Robert Cornwell (1835–1927), Union Army captain and law partner of William Darlington
- Isabel Darlington 1865–1950), lawyer and first woman to practice law in Chester County
- Smedley Darlington (1827–1899), United States Representative from 1887 to 1891
- William Darlington (1782–1863), botanist and United States Representative from 1815–1817 and 1819–1823
- Columbus Evans (1824–1854), newspaper editor, soldier, and mayor of Wilmington, Delaware
- Henry S. Evans (1813–1872), state senator and representative
- Benjamin Matlack Everhart (1818–1904), mycologist
- James Bowen Everhart (1785–1868), United States Representative from 1883 to 1887
- William Everhart (1785–1868), United States Representative from 1853 to 1855
- Thomas Lawrence Eyre (1862–1926), President Pro Tempore of the Pennsylvania Senate from 1921–1922
- J. Smith Futhey (1820–1888), historian and presiding judge of the Pennsylvania courts of common pleas
- Henry Ruhl Guss (1825–1907), U.S. Civil War brevet Major General
- Alexander Hemphill (1921–1986), Philadelphia City Comptroller and candidate for mayor and US Congress
- Joseph Hergesheimer (1880–1954), author of novels such as Three Black Pennys and Java Head
- John Hickman (1810–1875), United States Representative from 1855 to 1865
- Mott Hooton (1838–1920), U.S. brigadier general; veteran of the Civil War and Spanish–American War
- Herman Hutt (1872–1952), Pennsylvania state representative and chief burgess of West Chester
- Francis James (1799–1886), United States Representative from 1839 to 1843
- William Levis James (1833–1903), Union Army quartermaster and brevet brigadier general
- Plummer E. Jefferis (1851–1925), American politician from Pennsylvania
- Dewitt Clinton Lewis (1822–1899), American Civil War Medal of Honor recipient
- Joseph J. Lewis (1801–1883), author of the first biography of Abraham Lincoln and IRS commissioner
- Wilmer W. MacElree (1859–1960), lawyer, Chester County district attorney, and author
- Henry McIntire (1835–1863), Union Army lieutenant colonel fatally wounded at the Battle of Glendale
- Robert E. Monaghan (1822–1895), member of the Pennsylvania House of Representatives
- Uriah Hunt Painter (1837–1900), journalist, lobbyist, investor, and entrepreneur
- George Morris Philips (1851–1920), principal of West Chester University from 1881 to 1920
- George W. Roberts (1833–1862), Union Army colonel killed in action at the Battle of Stones River
- Joseph Trimble Rothrock (1839–1922), conservationist and Pennsylvania state forestry commissioner
- Barclay Rubincam (1920–1978), regionalist painter affiliated with the Brandywine School
- William T. Shafer (1825–1882), member of the Pennsylvania House of Representatives
- George Fairlamb Smith (1840–1877), Union Army colonel, state representative, and district attorney
- Persifor Frazer Smith (1808–1882), state delegate
- David Townsend (1787–1858), botanist, banker, and civic leader in whose honor Townsendia was named
- Washington Townsend (1813–1894), United States Representative from 1869 until 1877
- William Bell Waddell (1828–1897), state delegate and senator
- William Hollingsworth Whyte (1917–1999), sociologist and journalist who wrote the bestseller The Organization Man
- Wilmer Worthington (1804–1873), physician and Speaker of the Pennsylvania State Senate in 1869
- Garo Yepremian (1944–2015), professional American football placekicker who played with the Miami Dolphins
