= George W. Roberts =

Union Army colonel (1833–1862)

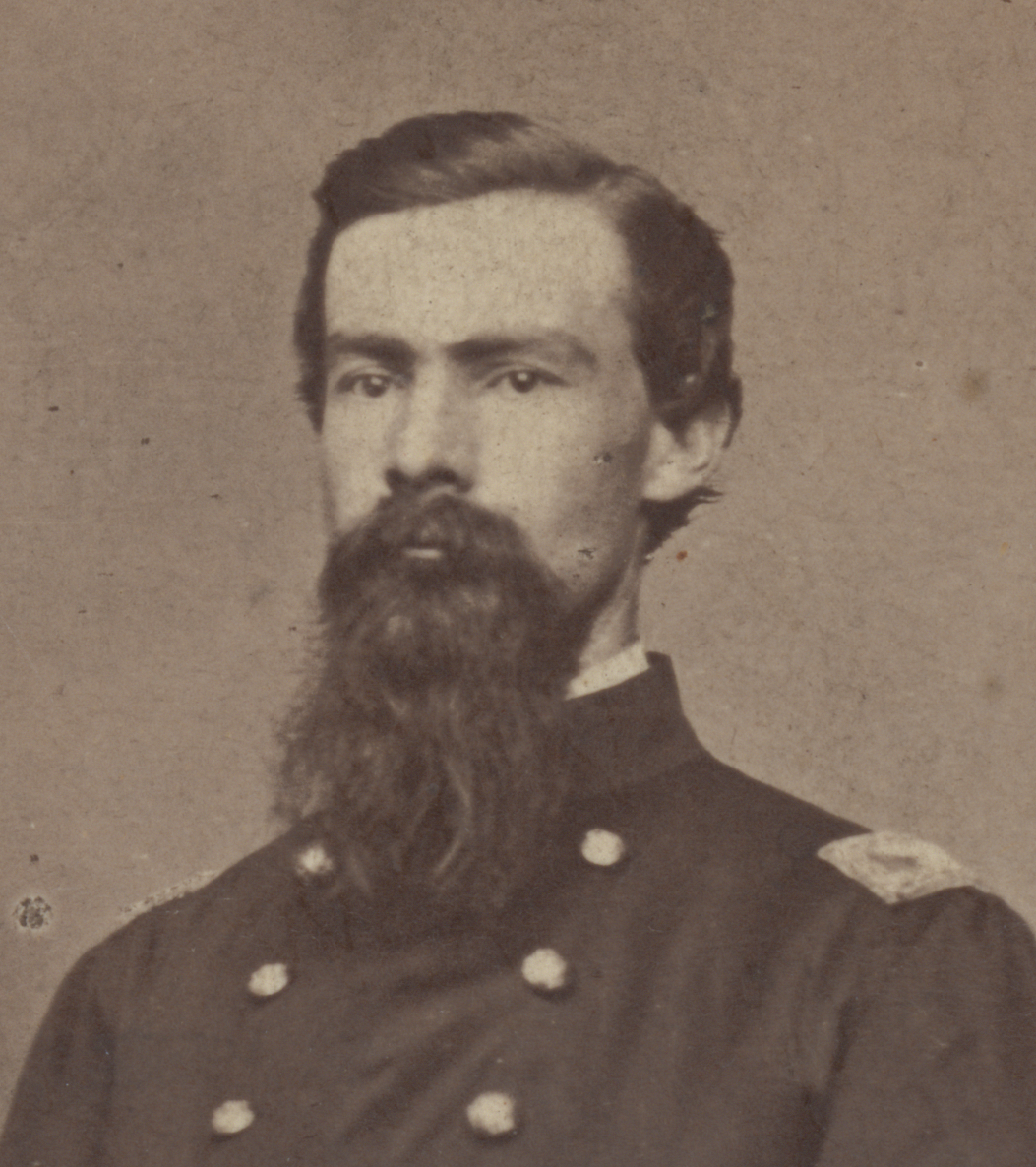
- Born: George Washington Roberts; October 2, 1833; East Goshen Township, Pennsylvania, U.S.
- Died: December 31, 1862 (aged 29); Murfreesboro, Tennessee, U.S.
- Burial place: Oaklands Cemetery, West Chester, Pennsylvania, U.S.
- Education: Yale University
- Military career
- Allegiance: United States (Union)
- Branch: U.S. Army (Union Army)
- Service years: 1861–1862
- Rank: Colonel
- Unit: 42nd Illinois Infantry Regiment
- Commands: 3rd Brigade of the 3rd Division, 20th Corps, Army of the Cumberland
- Conflicts: American Civil War; Battle of Island Number 10; Siege of Corinth; Battle of Stones River (KIA)

George Washington Roberts (October 2, 1833 – December 31, 1862) was an American military officer who served as colonel and commanding officer of a Union Army brigade in the Army of the Cumberland during the American Civil War. Roberts was killed in action leading his troops to repel Confederate attacks at the Battle of Stones River in 1862.

== Early life ==
Roberts was born on his family's farm in East Goshen Township, Pennsylvania. He was the eldest son of Pratt and Ann Wilson Roberts, of Welsh descent. He graduated with high honors from Yale University in 1857 and was a member of Delta Kappa Epsilon. He read law in West Chester under Joseph J. Lewis and gained admittance to the bar on January 8, 1858. He practiced law in West Chester until March 1, 1859, when he moved to Chicago and joined the law firm of E. S. Smith, where he swiftly developed a reputation for professional excellence.

== Civil War ==
When the Civil War erupted, Roberts helped David Stuart raise the 42nd Illinois Infantry Regiment of volunteers. On July 22, 1861, he received a commission as regimental colonel and on September 17 was elected lieutenant colonel. After Colonel William Webb's death from illness, he was promoted to full colonel on Christmas Eve 1861.

Assigned to the Department of the Missouri, Roberts and his regiment served in John C. Fremont's Missouri campaigns in 1861. While billeted at Stockton, in December 1861, Roberts faced a court-martial for, among other charges, shaking a German-American civilian named William Beck and calling him a "damned liar" and "infernal Dutch hound." Roberts was promptly acquitted. He went on to command garrisons at Holt, Missouri, and Columbus, Kentucky. At Holt he commanded the 42nd Illinois, the 8th Ohio Infantry Regiment, and a battery of the 2nd Illinois Artillery Regiment.

On the night of April 1, 1862, Roberts fought in the Battle of Island Number Ten, in which he distinguished himself by leading fifty troops under cover of darkness to raid a Confederate shore battery and spike its guns.

During the summer and fall of 1862, the 42nd Illinois participated in numerous skirmishes and engagements, including the Siege of Corinth and a sharp fight at Farmington, Mississippi. However, the regiment did not fight in major battles during this period. After a spell of garrison duty at Nashville, Tennessee, Roberts appealed to Major General William Rosecrans for a more active role. Rosecrans put him in command of the 3rd Brigade of the 3rd Division (commanded by Philip Sheridan), assigned to the 20th Army Corps commanded by Major General Alexander McCook in the Army of the Cumberland. Roberts commanded the 22nd Illinois, 27th Illinois, 42nd Illinois, and 51st Illinois Infantry Regiments.

At the Battle of Stones River, Sheridan's division caught the brunt of the Confederate army's opening assault on the morning of December 31, 1862. As the Confederates pushed back the Union army, Roberts, on horseback, personally led a bayonet charge that stabilized the line, giving Sheridan time to regroup. As Roberts' brigade conducted a fighting retreat, repulsing charge after charge from the rebels, the colonel was shot three times. Roberts died moments after ordering that he be tied onto his horse to lead yet another counterattack. He was the last of Sheridan's three brigade commanders to die at Stones River—Colonel Frederick Schaefer and Brigadier General Joshua W. Sill had been killed earlier that day. Roberts' brigade suffered 566 casualties, but the Army of the Cumberland held the field.

== Death and legacy ==
The Confederate Army of Tennessee interred Roberts' body with military honors on the field where he fell. A large stone with a rough-hewn inscription was placed atop his hastily dug grave. Roberts' remains were later disinterred and returned for burial to his home state of Pennsylvania. Final interment was at Oaklands Cemetery.

General Phillip Sheridan later wrote in his memoirs that Roberts "was an ideal soldier both in mind and body. He was young, tall, handsome, brave, and dashing and possessed a balanced wheel of such good judgment that, in his sphere of action, no occasion could arise, from which he would not reap the best results."
