= J. Smith Futhey =

American judge and historian (1820–1888)

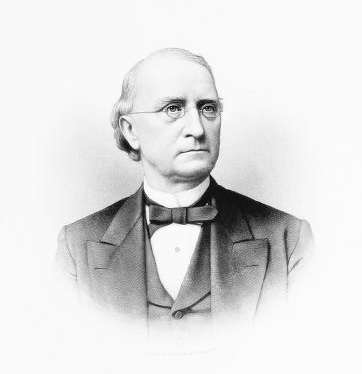

Presiding Judge of the Chester County Court of Common Pleas
- In office March 1, 1879 – November 26, 1888
- Preceded by: William Butler
- Succeeded by: William Bell Waddell

Personal details
- Born: John Smith Futhey; September 3, 1820 West Chester, Pennsylvania, US
- Died: November 26, 1888 (aged 68) West Chester, Pennsylvania, US
- Resting place: Oaklands Cemetery
- Occupation: Judge, lawyer, historian

J. Smith Futhey (September 3, 1820 – November 26, 1888) was an American historian and presiding judge of the 15th judicial district comprising Chester County, Pennsylvania, from 1879 until his death.

== Life and career ==
Futhey was born and raised in West Chester, Pennsylvania, eldest of five children born to Margaret (née Parkinson) and Robert Futhey. The family was of Scotch-Irish ancestry. Futhey's great-grandfather, Samuel Futhey, held three enslaved people as of 1780. His cousins included state legislator Samuel Futhey Dale.

Futhey studied law briefly at Dickinson College, read law, and gained admittance to the Chester County bar on February 7, 1843. He practiced law for decades and became "one of the most distinguished men in Chester County." He served as president of the Penn Mutual Fire Insurance Company of Chester County in the 1870s and served as a founding director of the National Bank of Chester County in 1864.

In February 1879, William Butler resigned as presiding judge of the Chester County Court of Common Pleas to accept an appointment to the federal bench. On February 27, 1879, Governor Henry M. Hoyt appointed Futhey to fill the remainder of Butler's term. In November 1879, Futhey was elected to a full ten-year term without opposition. He was the district's sole judge for most of his time in office, and his death was blamed on overwork. He died in office on November 26, 1888. William Bell Waddell was appointed on December 4 to finish his term. The county bar eulogized his integrity, industry, and benevolence.

His remains were interred in Oaklands Cemetery outside West Chester. Pallbearers include William Butler, William Bell Waddell, Washington Townsend, and many other local dignitaries and elected officials.

== Publications ==
Futhey was an enthusiastic and competent amateur historian, and with Gilbert Cope, he authored History of Chester County, Pennsylvania, with Genealogical and Biographical Sketches (Philadelphia: Louis H. Everts, 1881). "It is to him [Futhey] that the people of Chester County, as well as historians generally, are mainly indebted for information in regard to the early history of the county in all its varied lines," wrote Wilmer W. Thomson in 1898. In 1899, the Daily Local News described the monograph as "one of the most valuable works ever produced within the county." Writing in Pennsylvania History in 1972, Harry Whipkey remarked that Futhey and Cope's book "has long been a valuable tool for genealogists, researchers and historians interested in the early history of Chester County."

With his friend William Darlington, Futhey published "Notae Cestrienses," consisting of commentaries about notable people from Chester County, in the form of a column in a local newspaper. His other publications include "History of Upper Octorara Presbyterian Church" (1870), "History of Educational Institutions of Chester County" (1877), and "Historical Address on the 100th Anniversary of the Paoli Massacre" (1878).
