= University of Northern Pennsylvania =

19th century university in Pennsylvania

University of Northern Pennsylvania was a private institution of higher education in Bethany, Pennsylvania, which operated from 1850 to 1857.

The university was chartered in May 1848 and opened on December 2, 1850. In the fall of 1854, the Wyoming Annual Conference of the Methodist Episcopal Church assumed the running of the school. Two years later, it was purchased by former principal John F. Stoddard. It was destroyed by fire on April 18, 1857, and the school never reopened. Prominent graduates included Robert Cornwell, a Union Army officer and lawyer.
