= Wilmer W. MacElree =

American lawyer and author (1859–1960)

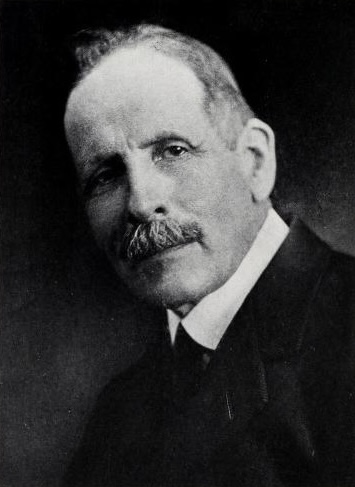
- MacElree, c. 1918
- Born: Wilmer Worthington MacElree; December 17, 1859; West Chester, Pennsylvania, U.S.
- Died: January 16, 1960 (aged 100); East Bradford Township, Pennsylvania, U.S.
- Burial place: Oaklands Cemetery
- Other name: W. W. MacElree
- Occupations: lawyer, author
- Political party: Republican

Wilmer Worthington MacElree (December 17, 1859 – January 16, 1960) was an American lawyer and author of Along the Western Brandywine and other books on the history and natural environment of Chester County, Pennsylvania. He served as Chester County district attorney for six years.

== Life and career ==
MacElree was born on December 17, 1859, in West Chester, Pennsylvania. His parents were Mariah (née Buffington) and James MacElree. His Irish-born father had immigrated to Pennsylvania in 1827 and settled in West Chester in 1852; his mother belonged to an old local family. MacElree attended public schools in West Chester, read law with John J. Pinkerton, and gained admittance to the county bar in 1880.

MacElree founded the law firm of MacElree Harvey, Ltd., which is still extant, and practiced law in West Chester until his retirement in 1956. He served as Chester County district attorney from 1897 to 1900 and again from 1906 to 1909. He defended six of the men who allegedly lynched Zachariah Walker in 1911. In his reminiscences, MacElree called the victim a "worthless negro from Virginia." As "the legal sage of Chester County," MacElree's defense role was instrumental in obtaining the acquittals from the jury.

A member of the Republican Party, MacElree ran for judge of the Pennsylvania Courts of Common Pleas but lost the election in a landslide to two-term incumbent Joseph Hemphill in 1909. Hemphill had received the endorsement of the Democratic Party and the backing of many Republicans in the election.

An enthusiastic amateur historian, MacElree lectured widely and published privately at least four books and many "sentimental" sketches and essays about the events, people, landmarks, and natural environment of Chester County. Active in the Westminster Presbyterian Church and serving ten years as a deacon in the First Presbyterian Church of West Chester, he helped to establish Sunday schools across the county.

On January 18, 1884, MacElree married Ella Eyre of West Chester. They had three children, two of whom survived to adulthood. Their son, James Paul MacElree, attended the University of Pennsylvania, joined his father's law firm in 1908, and served as presiding judge of the Chester County Orphan's Court.

The elder MacElree died of heart disease in East Bradford Township, Pennsylvania, on January 16, 1960, at the age of 100. He was interred at Oaklands Cemetery just outside West Chester.

== Publications ==
As an author, MacElree was well known in Chester County. Berenice Ball enjoyed MacElree's walks Along the Western Brandywine and travels Around the Boundaries of Chester County (1934), which constituted "fascinating-to-read forays into Chester County's past along Indian Trails, streams and early thoroughfares." Side Lights on the Bench and Bar of Chester County (1918) received praise from historian Charles William Heathcote, who declared that MacElree had "contributed materially to legal history" and observed that the book showed evidence of "a careful study of court records and an intimate knowledge of the characters of leading lawyers and judges from the organization of the court to the early years of the present century."

- MacElree, Wilmer W. (1934). Around the Boundaries of Chester County. West Chester, PA.
- MacElree, Wilmer W. (1918). Side Lights on the Bench and Bar of Chester County. West Chester, PA. hdl:2027/hvd.32044031777683.
- MacElree, Wilmer W. (1912). Along the Western Brandywine. West Chester, PA: F. S. Hickman, printer. hdl:2027/coo.31924028852477.
- MacElree, Wilmer W. (1906). Down the Eastern and Up the Black Brandywine. West Chester, PA: F. S. Hickman, printer. hdl:2027/njp.32101073810044.
