= Dewitt Clinton Lewis =

American Civil War Medal of Honor recipient (1822–1899)

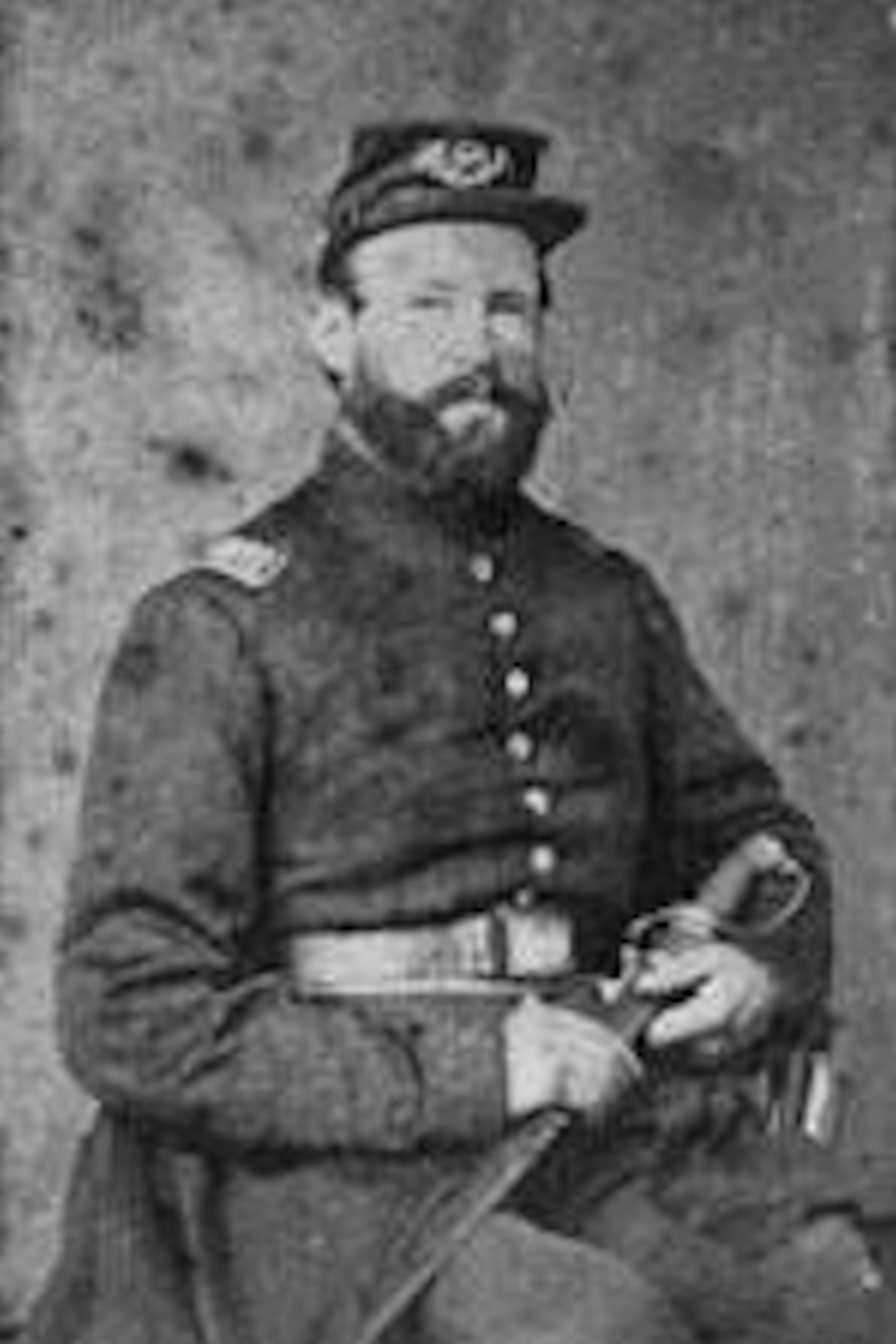
- Dewitt Clinton Lewis Medal of Honor marker in Oaklands Cemetery
- Born: July 30, 1822; West Chester, Pennsylvania, United States
- Died: June 28, 1899 (aged 76); Morton, Pennsylvania, United States
- Burial place: Oaklands Cemetery, West Chester, Pennsylvania, United States
- Military career
- Allegiance: United States of America; Union
- Branch: United States Army; Union Army
- Service years: 1861 – 1864
- Rank: Captain; Brevet Lieutenant Colonel
- Units: Company F, 97th Pennsylvania Infantry
- Conflicts: Battle of Secessionville; American Civil War
- Awards: Medal of Honor

Dewitt Clinton Lewis (July 30, 1822–June 28, 1899) was a Union Army soldier who served in the 97th Pennsylvania Infantry Regiment during the American Civil War. Lewis received his country's highest award for bravery during combat, the Medal of Honor. Lewis's medal was won for his actions at the Battle of Secessionville on June 16, 1862. He was honored with the award on April 23, 1896.

Lewis was from West Chester, Pennsylvania.

== Medal of Honor citation ==
While retiring with his men before a heavy fire of canister shot at short range, returned in the face of the enemy's fire and rescued an exhausted private of his company who but for this timely action would have lost his life by drowning in the morass through which the troops were retiring.

== Death, funeral and interment ==
Lewis died at the age of seventy-nine at his home in Morton, Pennsylvania on June 28, 1899. Following funeral services at his home on July 1, a funeral procession involving the Fame Fire Company and members of the Grand Army of the Republic, and services at the cemetery's chapel, he was interred at the Oaklands Cemetery in West Chester, Pennsylvania.

== See also ==
- List of American Civil War Medal of Honor recipients: G–L

== Gallery ==
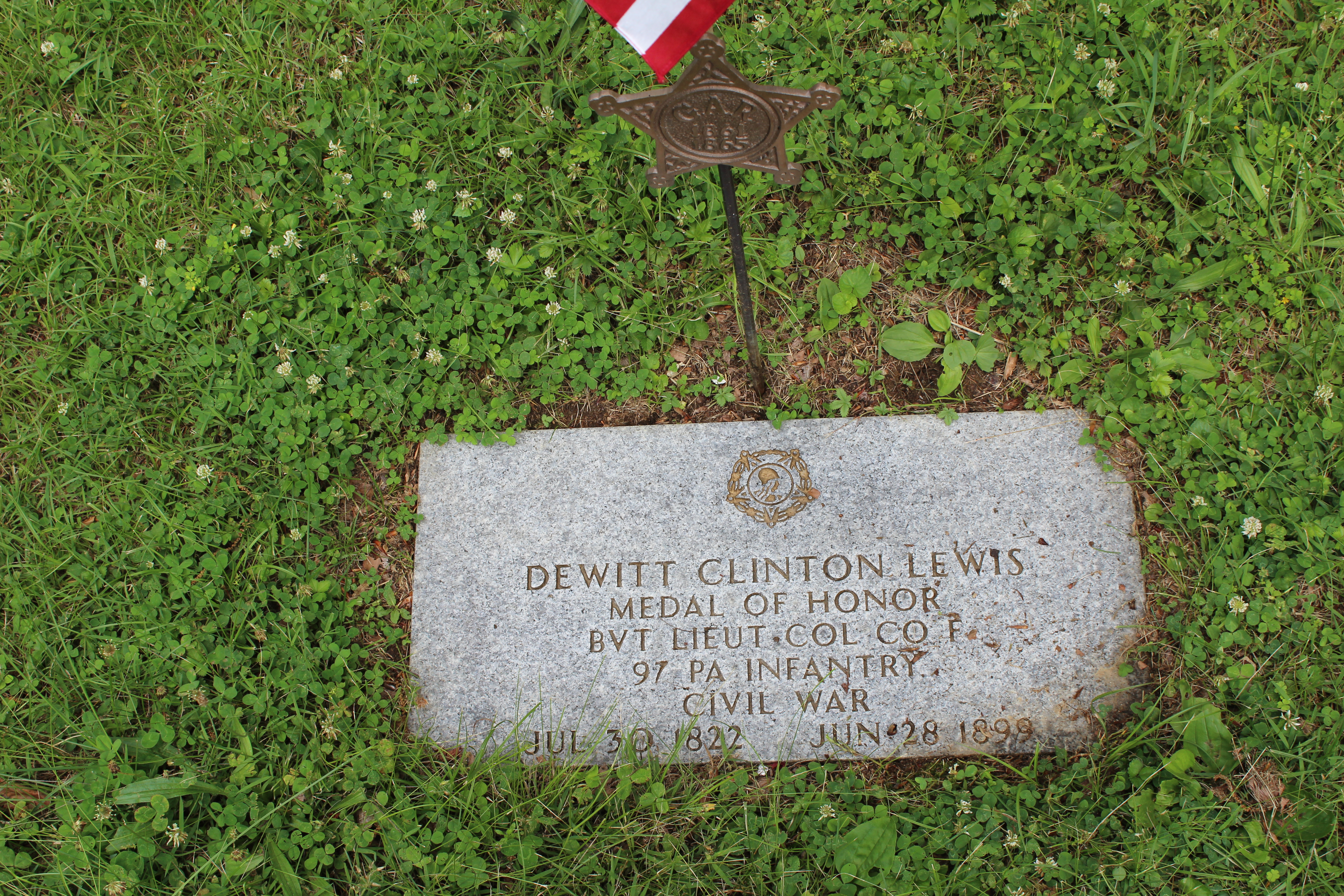
Dewitt Clinton Lewis Medal of Honor marker in Oaklands Cemetery

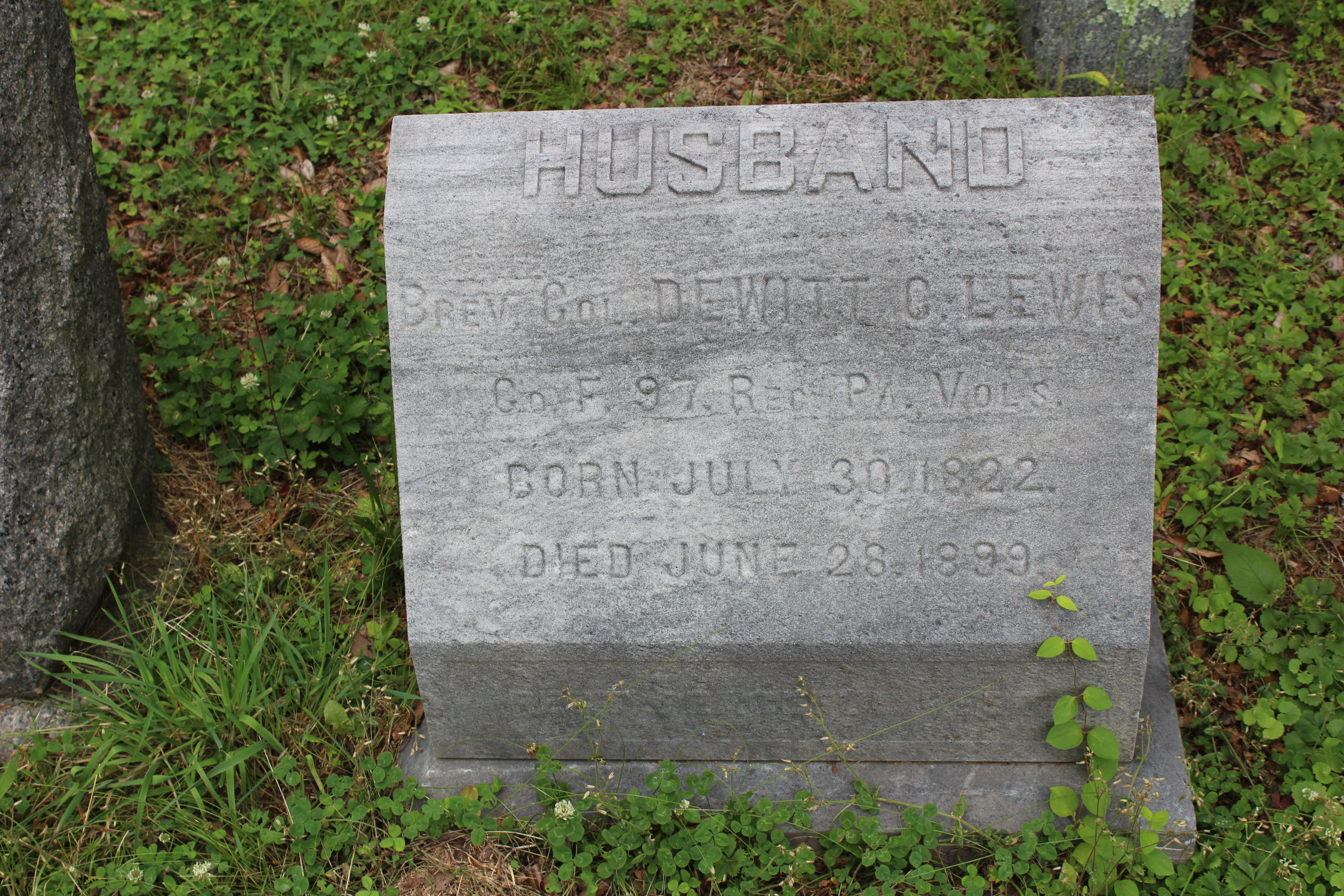
Dewitt Clinton Lewis tombstone in Oaklands Cemetery
