= Mott Hooton =

American soldier (1838–1920)

- Born: April 16, 1838; Philadelphia, Pennsylvania, US
- Died: May 30, 1920 (aged 82) Gardiner, Maine, US
- Buried: Oaklands Cemetery, West Goshen Township, Pennsylvania, US
- Allegiance: United States (Union)
- Branch: U.S. Army (Union Army)
- Service years: 1861–1864, 1866–1902
- Rank: Brigadier general
- Commands: 61st Pennsylvania Infantry Regiment, 28th Infantry Regiment
- Conflicts: American Civil War; Peninsula campaign; Battle of Gaines' Mill; Second Battle of Bull Run (WIA); Battle of Gettysburg; Bristoe campaign; Overland Campaign; Battle of Totopotomoy Creek (WIA); American Indian Wars; Battle of Cedar Creek; Spanish–American War; Siege of Santiago

Mott Hooton (April 16, 1838 – May 30, 1920) was an American soldier who retired at the rank of U.S. Army brigadier general in 1902. Serving almost continuously since 1861, Hooton fought in the American Civil War, the Indian Wars, and the Spanish–American War. He was wounded in action twice during the Civil War and commanded troops in Cuba and the Philippines.

== Early life and family ==
Mott Hooton was born on April 16, 1838, in Philadelphia to Ann Eliza (née Carpenter) and Mott Hooton Sr. His elder brother was Colonel Francis Carpenter Hooton, who commanded the 175th Pennsylvania Infantry Regiment during the American Civil War and later served as Chester County district attorney. Both sides of his family were of English heritage. Hooton's paternal great-grandfather, John Hooton, was a Loyalist captain of dragoons during the American Revolutionary War, while his maternal great-grandfather, Thomas Carpenter, was a Continental Army captain and colonel of Pennsylvania militia.

After Francis and Mott Hooton's father died in 1838, his mother took the children back to her family hometown of West Chester, Pennsylvania, where she soon married a local farmer named Maris Rhoads. Francis and Mott Hooton both attended Bolmar's Academy in West Chester.

== Military service ==
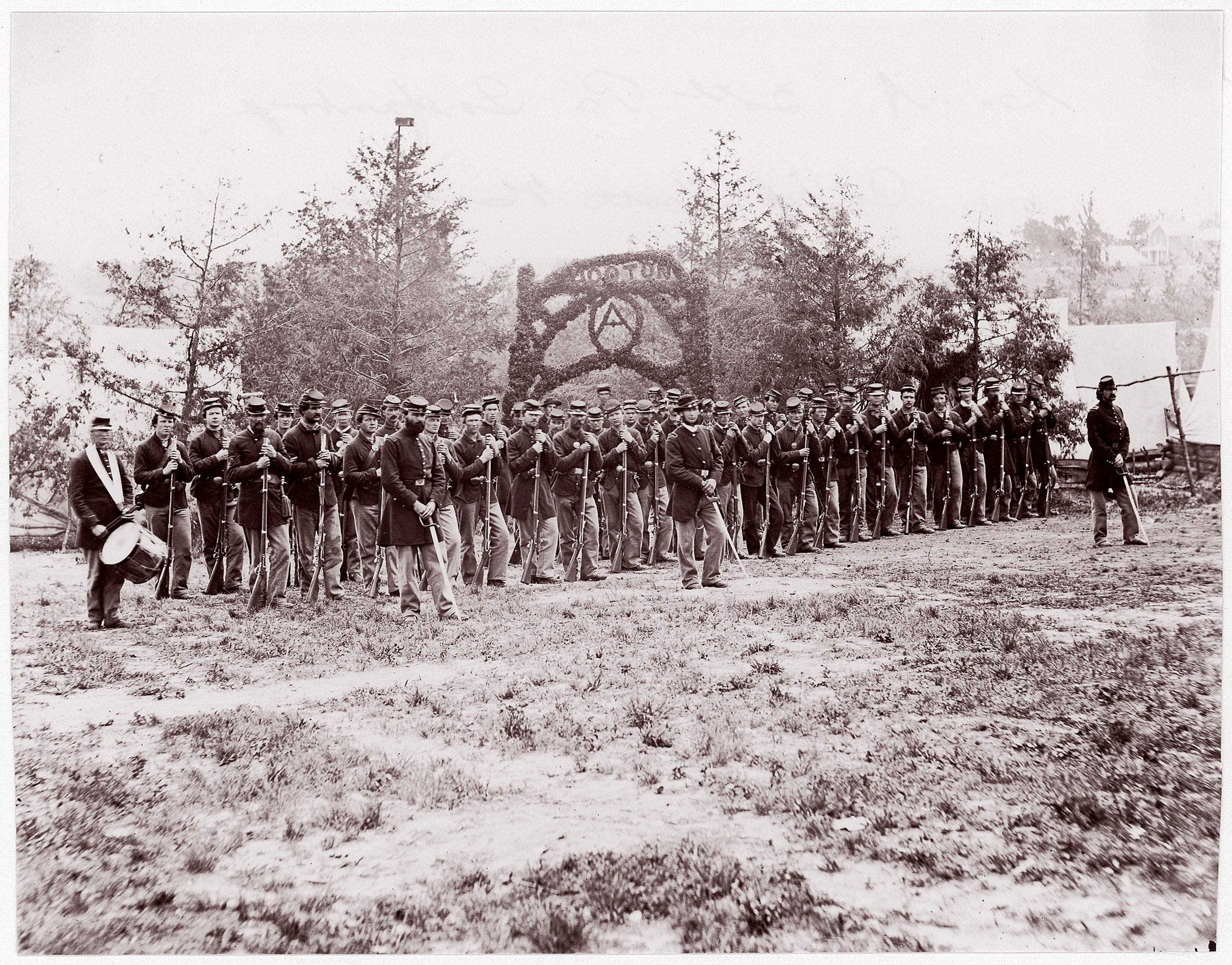
Troops and officers of Company A, 30th Pennsylvania, Union Army, commanded by Mott Hooton

=== Civil War ===
Hooton enlisted in the Union Army on June 3, 1861, starting his military career as first sergeant of Company A of the 1st Pennsylvania Reserve Regiment, commanded by Captain Henry McIntire. Commissioned as a second lieutenant on June 10, he became captain and commanding officer of Company A on October 16, McIntire having risen to lieutenant colonel. As part of the Army of the Potomac, he fought in the Peninsula Campaign and the Battle of Gaines' Mill. Seriously wounded at the Second Battle of Bull Run in August 1862, he took the better part of a year to recover.

Hooton returned to active duty in time to serve at the Battle of Gettysburg (July 1863), the Bristoe campaign and the Battle of Mine Run (October and November 1863), the Overland Campaign (May 1864), and other actions. Wounded again at the Battle of Totopotomoy Creek at the end of May 1864, he was honorably mustered out on June 13, 1864, when his term of enlistment expired. Nearly one year later, on March 13, 1865, he was brevetted a major of U.S. Volunteers for his "gallant and meritorious services in the Wilderness campaign."

=== Indian Wars ===
On February 23, 1866, Hooton enlisted in the United States Regular Army, receiving a commission as first lieutenant in the 13th Infantry Regiment. He served over thirty years on the American frontier, mostly garrisoning against Indian attacks. He deployed to Texas and Montana and spent six years at Fort Lewis in Colorado. He was transferred to the 31st Infantry Regiment on September 21, 1866, and to the 22nd infantry Regiment on May 15, 1869. He gained a promotion to captain on August 5, 1872, and a brevet to the rank of major on February 27, 1890, "for gallant and meritorious services in action against Indians at Spring Creek, Montana, October 15 and 16, 1876," when he led his troops in running clashes with Sioux warriors at the Battle of Cedar Creek.

In 1880, Hooton took a yearlong leave of absence from the army and traveled to Japan. In 1880–81, he crossed Siberia from Vladivostok west to Yekaterinburg, becoming the first American officer to complete this journey. In 1895, he published a short article entitled "Certain Historical Data Regarding Extended Order" in the Journal of the Military Service Institution of the United States.

=== Spanish–American War ===
On May 1, 1896, Hooton became major of the 25th Infantry Regiment, a Buffalo Soldier regiment. He became lieutenant colonel of the 5th Infantry Regiment on October 4, 1898, and deployed to Santiago de Cuba. He fought in the Santiago campaign and served a total of nine months in Cuba. He became colonel and commanding officer of the 28th Infantry Regiment on February 2, 1901, serving with his regiment in the Philippines. Promoted to brigadier general on April 15, 1902, he accepted mandatory retirement after 39 years of military service a day later on April 16, 1902.

Hooton's proposed promotion to brigadier general gained strong support from West Chester dignitaries as well as both U.S. Senators from Pennsylvania, Matthew Quay and Boies Penrose, who petitioned President Theodore Roosevelt to nominate Hooton for the promotion before he reached the Army's mandatory retirement age of 64. The U.S. Senate ultimately held a special executive session on April 15 to approve the nomination.

== Later life and death ==
Hooton never married and had no children. He moved to Maine after his retirement and died on May 30, 1920, at the age of 82 in Gardiner, Maine. He was interred at Oaklands Cemetery. His papers are held in the collections of the Chester County History Center.
