= William Levis James =

Union Army brevet brigadier general (1833–1903)

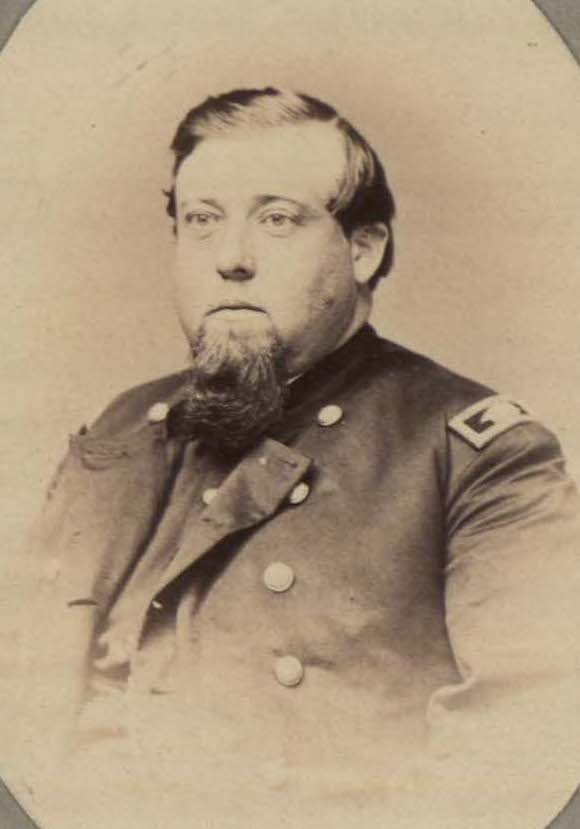
- Born: August 14, 1833; West Chester, Pennsylvania, U.S.
- Died: July 4, 1903 (aged 69); Riverton, New Jersey, U.S.
- Burial place: Oaklands Cemetery
- Military career
- Allegiance: United States
- Branch: United States Army
- Service years: 1862–1866
- Rank: Brigadier General (brevet)
- Unit: Department of Virginia

William Levis James (August 14, 1833 – July 4, 1903) was an American military officer who served as chief quartermaster of the Union Army's Department of Virginia during the American Civil War. He concluded his service at the rank of brevet brigadier general in 1866.

== Life and career ==
James was born on August 14, 1833, in West Chester, Pennsylvania, to Hickman and Margaret Fendall James. His father, a butcher, was evidently a respected local citizen who held the office of Recorder for Chester County as of 1855. James followed his father into the family business.

On November 2, 1862, James enlisted as a captain in the U.S. Volunteers. On November 26, he was promoted to full captain and assistant quartermaster in the Department of Virginia, eventually rising to chief quartermaster of the department. He was responsible for managing the Union Army's supplies, equipment, and transport in the region and evidently did not see combat. He adroitly oversaw logistics for the Union expeditionary force that sailed from Hampton Roads to Fort Fisher, North Carolina, and captured this Confederate fort in January 1865. A 1875 account attributed his subsequent promotions to the "secrecy and celerity with which he collected and equipped the transports, by which means the expedition was sent to sea." James was promoted to major on January 1, 1862; colonel on March 13, 1865; and brevet brigadier general on March 1, 1866, each time cited for his "faithful and meritorious services." He was honorably mustered out of service on July 31, 1866.

After leaving military service, James became a businessman and settled into relative obscurity. He worked as the general agent of the Philadelphia and Southern Mail Steamship Company from 1866 to 1881, when the company went out of business. He promptly took a job as the Philadelphia agent for the Ocean Steamship Company of Savannah, Georgia, and continued to work as a steamship agent at least through 1896. He was working as a Philadelphia-based insurance agent as of 1900. By the 1880s, James and his wife had converted their riverfront house in Riverton, New Jersey, across the Delaware River from Philadelphia, into a guest house and were taking in boarders. As of 1901, James was serving on the Riverton borough council and chairing the council's sewer committee.

From 1882 to 1902, he served as chancellor of the Pennsylvania chapter of the Military Order of the Loyal Legion of the United States.

== Personal life ==
James married twice and had five children. He married Sibilla Embree Janney in West Chester on April 18, 1861. The couple had one daughter, Ada Sibilla James (born 1862), and two sons, both of whom died in infancy. Sibilla herself died of consumption on January 19, 1870. Four years later, James married Anna Elizabeth Thompson (1839–1922) and had two more daughters, Margaret Fendall James (born in 1878) and Anna Whitall James (born in 1880).

James died at his Riverton home on July 4, 1903, at the age of 69. He was buried in the Oaklands Cemetery outside his hometown of West Chester.
