= Uriah Hunt Painter =

American journalist and lobbyist (1837–1900)

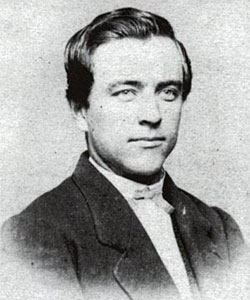
- Born: March 5, 1837; West Chester, Pennsylvania
- Died: October 20, 1900 (aged 63); Long Branch, New Jersey
- Burial place: Oaklands Cemetery
- Education: Oberlin College
- Occupations: Journalist, lobbyist, entrepreneur, investor
- Employer: Philadelphia Inquirer

Uriah Hunt Painter (March 5, 1837 – October 20, 1900) was an American journalist, lobbyist, entrepreneur, and investor. He broke the news of the Union defeat at the First Battle of Bull Run in 1861 and of the Confederate invasion of the North in 1862, became one of the earliest investors in Thomas Edison's phonograph company, and became implicated in the Crédit Mobilier scandal during the 1870s.

== Early life ==
Uriah Hunt was born on March 5, 1837, to Samuel Marshall and Ann (Vickers) Painter in West Chester, Pennsylvania, in the United States. His family was Quaker. Both his father and grandfather had worked as newspaper editors in West Chester. Painter attended Oberlin College before returning home in 1857 to run his father's faltering lumber concern. Negotiating an infusion of capital from Philadelphia-based investors, Painter ensured that the lumber company flourished, affording him a steady income for the rest of his life.

== Career ==
Painter came to Washington, D.C., in 1860 as a war correspondent for the Philadelphia Inquirer. He was the first to report the Union's defeat in the First Battle of Bull Run, "scooping the competition by a full 24 hours." Embedded with the Army of the Potomac, he interviewed freedom seekers and malingerers and deserters from both sides, becoming the first journalist to report on the Confederacy's plans to invade the North in September 1862. A furious Secretary of War Edwin M. Stanton ordered his arrest in the response to the report, which Stanton deemed false. Painter was quickly released when his report proved true.

After the war, Painter stayed in Washington as a correspondent, bureau chief, lobbyist, and political activist. He exercised influence as clerk of the House Committee on Post Office and Roads for ten years. He reported for the Philadelphia Inquirer, the New York Sun, the New-York Tribune, the Chicago Republican, and the Washington Post. During the Gilded Age of the 1870s and 1880s, Painter became an influential Washington lobbyist, best known for his connections to powerful railroad and shipyard magnates. He allegedly used his skills as an investigative journalist to uncover secrets and essentially blackmail corrupt politicians and business executives into supplying him with payoffs and insider trading information in exchange for his silence. Painter was implicated in the Crédit Mobilier scandal and allegedly sought a cut of the monies circulating to buy support for legislation backing the Alaska Purchase. His peers in the press gallery denounced him as Uriah Heep, "after that crawling impersonation of meanness" in the novel David Copperfield. Painter retired from the press corps in 1885 under a cloud of scandal, though never publicly accused or prosecuted for any crimes.

Throughout his life, Painter's investments and startup companies flourished. His West Chester businesses included the Delaware and Atlantic Telegraph and Telephone Company, the West Chester Telegraph Company, the West Chester Opera House at Horticultural Hall, his father's lumber company, and an ice company. He constructed the first telegraph lines in West Chester and hired one of the nation's first female telegraphers, Emma Hunter. He was among the first investors to fund and promote Thomas Edison's phonograph and Alexander Graham Bell's telephone, and he helped organize the first telephone company in Washington, D.C. He built the Lafayette Square Opera House in 1895. Under the auspices of industrialist Thomas A. Scott, he planned and organized the construction of the New York, Philadelphia and Norfolk Railroad. Painter was also a keen user of the latest technological inventions. One hundred of his photographs, snapped in 1889 using one of the nation's first Kodak cameras, were donated to the Library of Congress in 1949.

A lifelong adherent of the Republican Party, Painter attended every Republican National Convention from 1856 to 1896.

== Personal life ==
Painter married Belinda Avery of Mansfield, Ohio, on September 18, 1862. They had two daughters, Ellen (Ella) Avery and Alice Elise. He died from stomach cancer on October 20, 1900, in Long Branch, New Jersey, at the age of 63. Interment was in the Oaklands Cemetery outside West Chester.

The Chester County History Center holds his papers (including 27,000 telegrams dated from 1859 to 1890), which his daughters donated in 1948. The society transferred another ten thousand papers, comprising material of interest beyond the region, to the Historical Society of Pennsylvania in 1951.
