= Barclay Rubincam =

American regionalist painter (1920–1978)

- Born: Barclay Lawrence Rubincam; July 2, 1920; Unionville, Chester County, Pennsylvania, US
- Died: June 24, 1978 (aged 57); Elsmere, Delaware, US
- Resting place: Oaklands Cemetery, West Goshen Township, Pennsylvania
- Education: N. C. Wyeth
- Alma mater: Wilmington Academy of Art
- Known for: Painting
- Style: Regionalism
- Movement: Brandywine School

Barclay Lawrence Rubincam (July 2, 1920 – June 24, 1978) was an American artist who painted mostly in a regionalist style. He specialized in natural and historical scenes of his native Chester County, Pennsylvania. His art is held in the permanent collections of the Pennsylvania Museum of Art, the Brandywine Museum of Art, and the Chester County History Center.

== Biography ==
Rubincam was born in Green Valley near Unionville, Chester County, Pennsylvania, on July 2, 1920, to Jacob and Florence Hoopes Rubincam. He grew up on his family farm. In his teens, he worked as an usher at Warner Theater in West Chester, where he met his wife, Caroline Hannum Rubincam. They had four children: Andre, Reginald, Christopher, and Ghisele.

A friend of Andrew Wyeth, Rubincam studied under N. C. Wyeth, Frank Schoonover, and Gayle Porter Hoskins and graduated from the Wilmington Academy of Art. He served in the U.S. Army from 1942 to 1945, first with an engineering unit in the South Pacific and then with the Army's information education section producing illustrations and posters. He then settled into full-time work as an artist for the rest of his life. When not producing art, he canoed on the Brandywine, crafted furniture, listened to classical music, and gardened. He lived in West Chester with his family for thirty years. He was a member of the Wilmington Society of Fine Arts, Philadelphia Art Alliance, Chester County Art Association, and Chester County Historical Society.

After a short illness, Rubincam died at a veterans administration hospital in Elsmere, Delaware, on June 24, 1978, at the age of 57. His wife and children survived him. By the time of his death, he had become "practically an institution in Chester County" and an "important realist in the Brandywine school." However, his reputation never quite transcended Chester County and its environs. His remains were interred at Oaklands Cemetery outside West Chester.

== Artworks ==
Rubincam painted landscapes, portraits, and still lifes and is best known for his nostalgic views of agrarian life, local landmarks, and the American Revolutionary War. He "combined his sensitive observations of nature with a deep respect for the country's history." Like Andrew Wyeth, Rubincam painted and sketched ordinary objects—barns, bridges, bureaus, chairs, stairs, and windows—using sharp lines and contrasts and blending genres such as still lifes with local landscapes and historical scenes. He showed his artwork at local banks, florists, and other businesses and became one of the first local artists to sell limited-edition prints of his paintings, which bolstered his reach.

Rubincam exhibited his work at the Pennsylvania Academy of the Fine Arts, Philadelphia Art Alliance, Chester County Art Association, Wilmington Society of the Fine Arts, Hagley Museum, Toledo Museum of Art, West Chester State Teachers College, and Pennsylvania State University. In 1996, the Brandywine Museum of Art hosted an exhibition called "Barclay Rubincam Close Up" featuring twenty of Rubincam's works, including Tomatoes on Windowsill (1952), a still life (of tomatoes on a windowsill) set at the historic Birmingham Friends Meetinghouse. From November 1998 through April 1999, the Chester County History Center hosted the largest exhibition of his works, featuring more than sixty of his paintings, including still lifes, portraits, landscapes, and historical scenes, especially depictions of American Revolutionary War soldiers.

Rubincam's works are held in several permanent museum collections. In addition to many paintings held by the Chester County History Center, Hessians Marching Past the Barns-Brinton House at the Battle of Brandywine (1976) is held by the Chadds Ford Historical Society. The Open Drawer (1953; oil on gesso board) has been held by the Pennsylvania Museum of Art since 2008. I Believe (1955; oil on gessoed masonite) has been held by the Pennsylvania Academy of the Fine Arts since 1958. Memorial Day (1951; oil on gesso panel), a simple still life featuring a rocking chair on a porch, has been held by the Brandywine Museum of Art since 2008.

Rubincam painted the Marlborough Meeting House and gave the picture to his friend Charles Barnard, a Quaker minister. He received an honorable mention in 1950 and a $50 prize in 1952 at the Delaware Art Center's annual show. His work appeared in a tri-state show hosted by the Philadelphia Art Alliance in 1953.

In 1959, his painting Summer Along the Brandywine garnered the most votes in the Delaware Art Center's "My Favorite Painting Poll."
