= Robert Cornwell =

American soldier, lawyer, and educator (1835–1927)

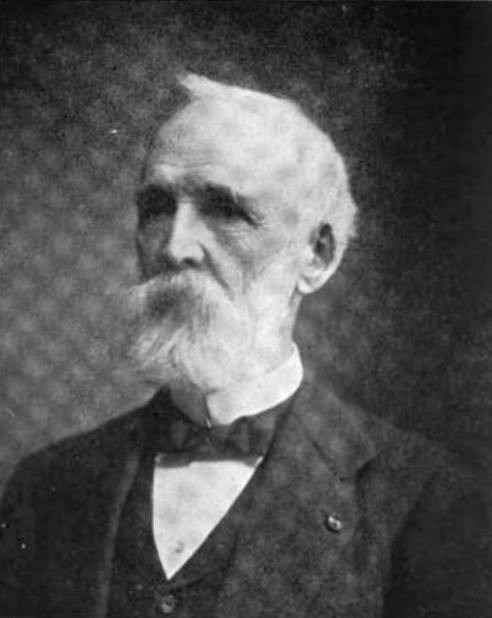
- Cornwell, c. 1899
- Born: Robert Thompson Cornwell; January 29, 1835; Orange County, New York, U.S.
- Died: April 26, 1927 (aged 92); West Chester, Pennsylvania, U.S.
- Burial place: Oaklands Cemetery, West Chester, Pennsylvania, U.S.
- Military career
- Allegiance: United States (Union)
- Branch: U.S. Army (Union Army)
- Service years: 1862–1864
- Rank: Captain
- Units: Company I, 67th Pennsylvania Volunteer Regiment

Robert Thompson Cornwell (January 29, 1835 – April 26, 1927) was an American soldier, lawyer, and educator. Serving as a Union Army captain during the American Civil War, he was captured and imprisoned in the notorious Confederate Libby Prison. After the war, he became a prominent citizen of West Chester, Pennsylvania, and a partner in the law firm of William Darlington.

== Early life and education ==
Cornwell was born in Orange County, New York, on January 29, 1835, to Daniel and Elizabeth (Thompson) Cornwell. His parents were farmers. Cornwell attended Monticello Academy in Sullivan County, New York, and the University of Northern Pennsylvania in Bethany, Pennsylvania. He taught at both of his alma maters in 1853 and 1854. In April 1855, he moved to Millersville, Pennsylvania, to teach at the Lancaster County Normal School, founded that same year by county superintendent James P. Wickersham. In the fall of 1858, Cornwell and another teacher founded a normal school in Indiana, Pennsylvania, which eventually evolved into Indiana University of Pennsylvania.

== Military career ==
When the American Civil War erupted in April 1861, Cornwell raised a company of infantry troops in response to President Abraham Lincoln's call for volunteers. Cornwell soon disbanded the company, as Lincoln's quota for Pennsylvania volunteers had been filled. In August 1862, he raised another company, which joined the 67th Pennsylvania Volunteer Regiment, attached to the Army of the Potomac. He became captain and commanding officer of Company I. His company guarded infrastructure in Annapolis and Baltimore in 1862 and later deployed to West Virginia.

At the Second Battle of Winchester in June 1863, Cornwell was captured by the Confederates while sick with typhoid fever in a military hospital. He was held as a prisoner of war at the Confederate Libby Prison in Richmond, Virginia, until paroled on May 2, 1864. In July 1864, he joined the staff of General James B. Ricketts, serving as provost marshal of the 3rd Division of the VI Corps. Cornwell served at the Battle of Monocacy and in Philip Sheridan's Shenandoah Valley Campaign. He was honorably discharged on October 25, 1864, when his term of enlistment ended.

== Later life and career ==
Following his military service, Cornwell joined his wife in West Chester, Pennsylvania. He read law under William Bell Waddell and gained admittance to the Chester County bar on December 10, 1866. From 1868 to 1878, he practiced law alongside William Darlington in the firm of Darlington & Cornwell. A prominent citizen of West Chester, he served as a member of the town's school board, founding secretary of the West Chester State Normal School, president of the Electric Light Company of West Chester, president of the Chester County Hospital, chair of the executive committee of the Dime Savings Bank of Chester County, board member of the National Bank of Chester County, and secretary and treasurer of the Oaklands Cemetery. He held most of these offices for decades. A lifelong Republican who cast his first vote for president for John C. Frémont in 1856, Cornwell never sought elected office. According to his Civil War letters, he opposed Black suffrage and, like many Union soldiers, volunteered to fight in order to preserve the Union.

From 1873 to 1878, Cornwell served as an officer in the Pennsylvania National Guard. During the Pittsburgh railroad strike of 1877, he and his troops escorted a train taking Governor John Hartranft to Pittsburgh and subsequently protected freight trains from rioters. He was elected to the Military Order of the Loyal Legion of the United States, Commandery of the State of Pennsylvania, in 1893.

== Personal life and death ==
Cornwell married Lydia Ann Jackson of Chester, Pennsylvania, on May 9, 1859. The couple had five children: Gibbons Gray, Martha Jackson, Mary Elizabeth, Ada Westlake, and William Darlington, who was named in honor of Cornwell's friend and business partner. Gibbons Gray earned a law degree from Yale University, practiced law with his father, and rose to the rank of lieutenant colonel during the Spanish–American War.

Cornwell died at his home in West Chester on April 26, 1927, at the age of 92. He was interred at Oaklands Cemetery.
