= Herman Hutt =

American politician (1872–1952)

Herman G. Hutt

Pennsylvania House of Representatives
- In office 1901–1906

Personal details
- Born: July 11, 1872 Philadelphia, US
- Died: June 13, 1952 (aged 79) West Chester, Pennsylvania
- Resting place: Oaklands Cemetery
- Party: Republican
- Spouse: Martha Henry (m. 1905; died 1952)
- Children: 2
- Occupation: Politician; businessman

Herman G. Hutt (July 11, 1872 – June 13, 1952) was an American politician, businessman, and amateur boxer. He served in the Pennsylvania House of Representatives as a Republican from 1901 to 1906.

== Life and career ==
Born in Philadelphia and educated in public schools in that city, Hutt was a grocer and butcher who served as president of the Philadelphia Live Stock Association. In 1900, he was elected to the Pennsylvania House of Representatives as a Republican representing the 15th district of Philadelphia. He was reelected in 1902 and 1904 and served three terms in office from 1901 to 1906. He did not seek reelection in 1906. Hutt was later elected chief burgess of West Chester, Chester County, Pennsylvania, serving from 1922 to 1926. He did not seek reelection in 1925. He also served as a trustee of Temple University.

Hutt was a noted amateur boxer who at one point held a world record for bag punching. In 1911, he defeated world lightweight champion Ad Wolgast in a friendly impromptu boxing match at Hutt's private gymnasium, which Wolgast had been using for training while recovering from an injury.

In 1905, Hutt married Martha Henry, an educator and Temple University alumna from Goldsboro, Pennsylvania. The Harrisburg Telegraph reported stiffly that "none of Mr. Hutt's friends in Philadelphia knew of his matrimonial intentions until he went home with his bride." Hutt had a son and a daughter from a previous marriage. Martha Hutt died at the age of 76 on May 17, 1952, less than a month before the death of her husband.

Hutt died at Chester County Hospital in West Chester on June 13, 1952, at the age of 79. He was interred at Oaklands Cemetery.
