= Wilmer Worthington =

American politician and physician (1804–1873)

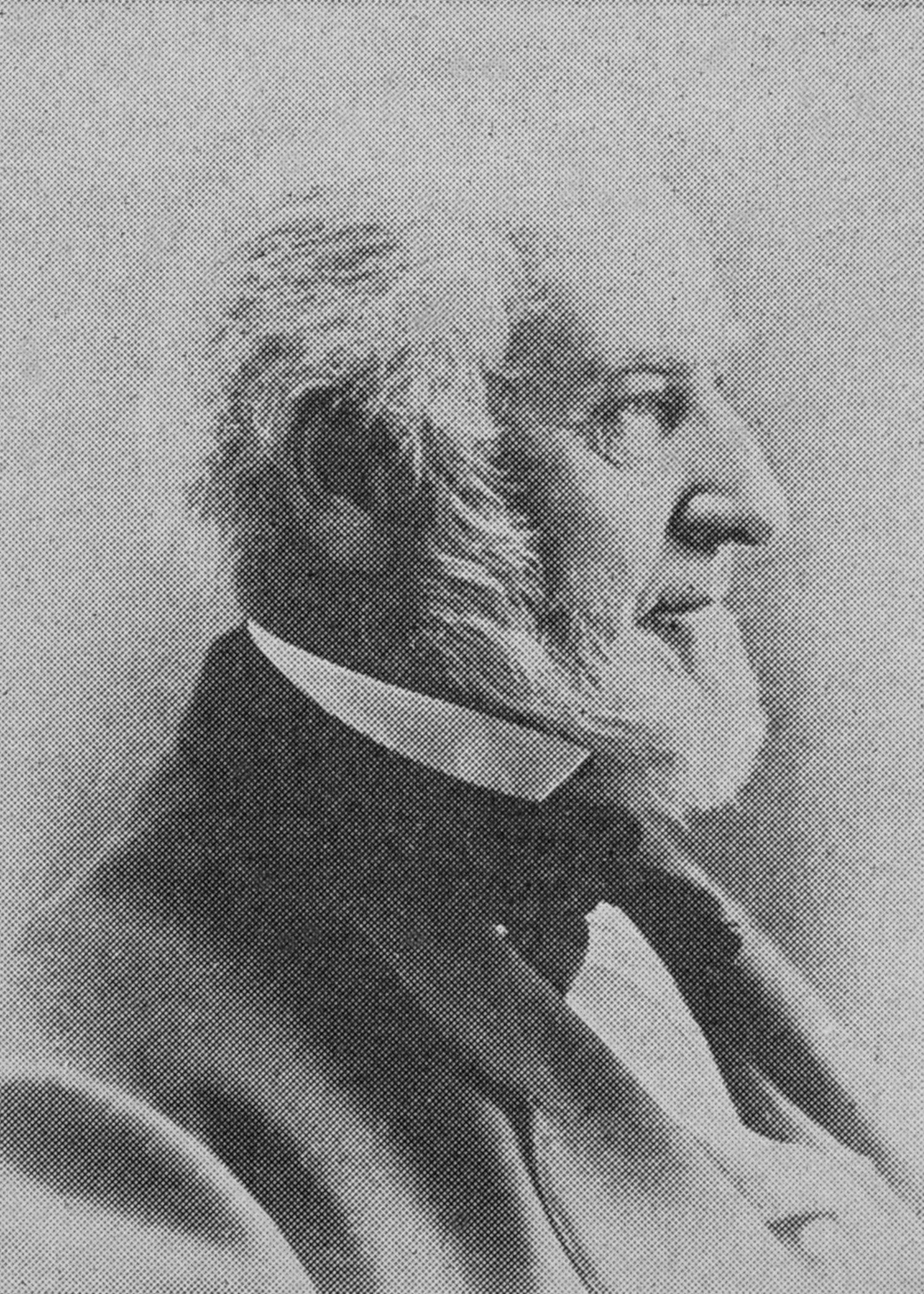

Speaker of the Pennsylvania Senate
- In office 1869

Member of the Pennsylvania Senate from the 2nd district
- In office 1864–1869
- Preceded by: Thomas S. Bell
- Succeeded by: Henry S. Evans

Member of the Pennsylvania House of Representatives from the Chester County district
- In office 1833–1834 Serving with Oliver Alison, Samuel McCleane, Thomas I. ?
- Preceded by: Thomas Ashbridge, Arthur Andrews, Benjamin Griffith, Elijah F. Pennypacker
- Succeeded by: Elijah F. Pennypacker, Charles Brooke, John Hutchinson, John Parker

Personal details
- Born: January 22, 1804 West Goshen Township, Chester County, Pennsylvania, U.S.
- Died: September 11, 1873 (aged 69) West Chester, Pennsylvania, U.S.
- Resting place: Oaklands Cemetery
- Party: Democratic (1833–1844); Republican (1860–1869)
- Spouse: Elizabeth McClellan Hemphill (m. 1826)
- Children: 9
- Education: University of Pennsylvania
- Occupation: medical doctor

Wilmer Worthington (January 22, 1804 – September 11, 1873) was an American politician and medical doctor who served in the Pennsylvania Senate from 1864 through 1869, serving as Speaker in 1869. A member of the Republican Party while in the Senate, Worthington previously served in the Pennsylvania House of Representatives as a Democrat from 1833 to 1834.

== Early life and education ==
Worthington was born on January 22, 1804, in West Goshen Township, Chester County, Pennsylvania, to Amos and Jane (Taylor) Worthington. His father was a well-to-do farmer. His paternal ancestors were Quakers who emigrated to America from Lancashire in 1699. He attended West Chester Academy, read medicine as a pupil of Dr. William Darlington, and graduated from the University of Pennsylvania in 1825. After six months practicing medicine at Byberry, Worthington returned to West Chester and established a successful practice that continued through 1865, when he retired to focus on his public duties.

== Politics and medicine ==
Worthington practiced at the Philadelphia Lazaretto, the first American quarantine hospital, from 1839 to 1841. He was a founding member and president of the Chester County Medical Society, delegate to the first meeting of the American Medical Association (1847), president of the Pennsylvania Chapter of the American Medical Association (1850), and president of the Pennsylvania Medical Society. He co-edited the Medical Reporter, a journal published by the Chester County Medical Society from 1863 to 1866. In addition to his professional service, Worthington served on the boards of the National Bank of Chester County, West Chester State Normal School, Oaklands Cemetery, and the West Chester and Philadelphia Railroad Company. A devout Presbyterian, Worthington also served as an elder and synod commissioner to the Presbyterian General Assembly.

Worthington was elected as a Democrat to the Pennsylvania House of Representatives, representing Chester County. He served from 1833 to 1834. He backed Stephen A. Douglas for president in 1860 but on the outbreak of the American Civil War allied himself with the Republicans. He was elected as a Republican to the Pennsylvania Senate, representing the 2nd District (Chester and Delaware Counties) in 1864. From 1865 to 1869 he represented the 5th Senate District (Chester, Delaware, and Montgomery counties). He served as the Speaker of the Senate (equivalent to the president pro tempore) during his final year in office. He chaired the Senate Education and Library Committees throughout his time in office and served on the Finance and Judiciary Committees.

Worthington championed legislation that established the Soldier’s Orphans Schools, the Board of Public Charities, and County Superintendents of Education. He also shepherded Pennsylvania's ratification of the Fifteenth Amendment, passed by the state senate on a 18-15 vote on March 11, 1869. After he retired from the Senate, President Ulysses S. Grant appointed him surveyor of the Port of Philadelphia. In 1870, Worthington resigned to accept a gubernatorial appointment as general agent and secretary of the newly established Pennsylvania State Board of Public Charities. He subsequently traveled more than 11,000 miles to examine and report on prisons and poorhouses throughout the state. He resigned in May 1873 due to ill health.

== Personal life ==
Worthington married Elizabeth McClellan Hemphill on September 28, 1826, and had nine children: Malinda Marshall Hoopes, Emily Elizabeth Wood, Ann Jane Dallett, Antoinette E. Worthington, Amos Edward Worthington, Casper P. Worthington, Kate D. Marshall, William Hemphill Worthington, and Amos Edward Worthington.

Worthington died of coronary heart disease in West Chester on September 11, 1873. He was interred in Oaklands Cemetery. His widow died on May 10, 1875.
