= Charlton Thomas Lewis =

US lexicographer (1834–1904)

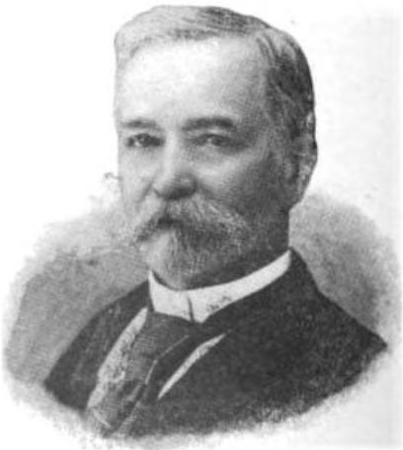
- Lewis in a 1899 publication

Personal details
- Born: February 25, 1834 West Chester, Pennsylvania, U.S.
- Died: May 26, 1904 (aged 70) Morristown, New Jersey, U.S.
- Spouses: Nancy D. McKeen (m. 1861) Margaret P. Sherrard (m. 1885)
- Parent: Joseph J. Lewis (father)
- Education: Yale University
- Occupation: Lawyer; writer; lexicographer

Charlton Thomas Lewis (February 25, 1834 – May 26, 1904) was an American lawyer, writer, and lexicographer, who is particularly remembered as a compiler of several Latin–English dictionaries.

== Biography ==
Lewis was born in West Chester, Pennsylvania, to Joseph J. Lewis and Mary (Miner) Lewis. He graduated from Yale University in 1853. After further studying with a view to entering the ministry of the Methodist Episcopal Church, he served as professor at the State Normal University at Bloomington, Illinois, 1856–57, and from 1858 to 1861 was professor of Greek at Methodist-affiliated Troy University (New York).

In 1863–64 he was a United States deputy commissioner of internal revenue. He began the practice of law in New York City in 1865. For a year in 1870–71, he served as the managing editor of the New York Evening Post newspaper. In 1871 he returned to law practice, where he specialized in insurance law and was longstanding law counsel for a large insurance company in New York city. During 1898–99, he was a lecturer on insurance at Harvard, Columbia and Cornell universities.

He was also president of the Prison Association of New York and of the State Charities Aid Association of New Jersey.

He married Nancy D. McKeen in 1861. He married Margaret P. Sherrard in 1885.

He died in Morristown, New Jersey, as a result of cerebrospinal meningitis.

== Works ==
Major published works:

- Gnomon of the New Testament, translated from the German of Bengel (1861)
- A History of Germany, from the Earliest Times (1870)
- A Latin Dictionary, in collaboration with Charles Short (1879) (also known as Harper's Latin Dictionary)
- Latin Dictionary for Schools (1889)
- An Elementary Latin Dictionary (1890)
