= Harry W. Bass (Pennsylvania politician) =

American politician (1866–1917)

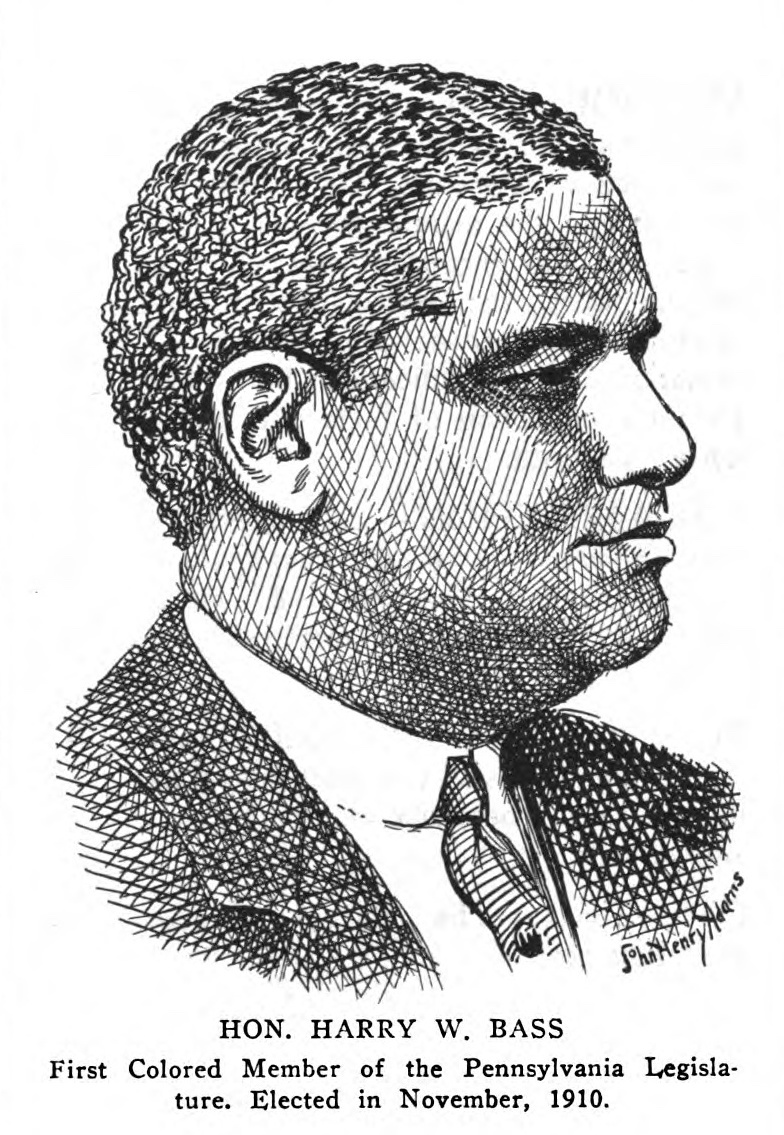
- Portrait on the front page of The Crisis (1911)

Member of the Pennsylvania House of Representatives
- In office 1911–1914

Personal details
- Born: November 4, 1866 West Chester, Pennsylvania, US
- Died: June 9, 1917 (aged 50) Philadelphia, Pennsylvania, US
- Education: Lincoln University, University of Pennsylvania Law School
- Occupation: Lawyer, politician

Harry W. Bass (4 November 1866 – 9 June 1917) was an American lawyer and politician who became the first African American to serve in the Pennsylvania House of Representatives, winning two consecutive terms in 1911 and 1913 to represent the sixth district (including primarily black seventh ward) of Philadelphia.

== Life and career ==
Bass was a native of West Chester, Pennsylvania, born on 4 November 1866. After attending local public schools, he earned a degree from Lincoln University in 1886, then studied law at Howard University before graduating from the University of Pennsylvania Law School in 1896.

As a law student, Bass lived in South Philadelphia and ran for the Pennsylvania House of Representatives for the first time in 1896, while affiliated with the People's Legislative Party, and lost. Bass contested the 1898 elections for state representative, again as a PLP candidate, and lost for a second time. Four years after completing his degree in law, Bass represented an African American tenant who, in 1900, had been evicted from his Bryn Mawr residence by the Methodist Episcopal Church, a church of white parishioners.

Bass joined the Republican Party and served multiple terms as an elected representative of the Republican State Committee from Philadelphia. As a Republican backed by Boies Penrose, he won two consecutive terms to the Pennsylvania House of Representatives in 1911 and 1913, becoming the first African American member of the Pennsylvania General Assembly. He represented the sixth district of the House, which comprised the heavily African American seventh ward of Philadelphia. In 1911–1912, he was a member of a commission convened to organize celebrations of the fiftieth anniversary of the Emancipation Proclamation, and he was credited with helping the commission secure $20,000 in funding via appropriations.

Bass was not a candidate for the state house during the 1915 election cycle. Appointed to serve as an assistant municipal solicitor by Philadelphia's municipal solicitor John P. Connelly in February 1916, Bass served in this role until his death, when George Henry White succeeded him.

Bass died on 9 June 1917 in Philadelphia of chronic interstitial nephritis, according to his death certificate. He was buried in Chestnut Grove Cemetery north of West Chester. He never married and had no issue.
