= Joseph J. Lewis =

American biographer and tax commissioner (1801–1883)

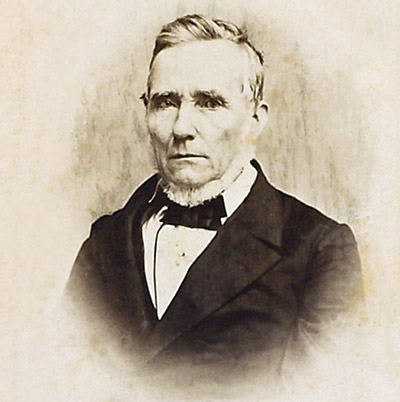
- Lewis in 1862

2nd Commissioner of Internal Revenue
- In office March 5, 1863 – June 30, 1865 (acting commissioner March 5–March 17, 1863)
- President: Abraham Lincoln; Andrew Johnson
- Preceded by: George S. Boutwell
- Succeeded by: William Orton

Personal details
- Born: Joseph Jackson Lewis; October 5, 1801 Westtown Township, Pennsylvania, US
- Died: April 5, 1883 (aged 81) West Chester, Pennsylvania
- Resting place: Oaklands Cemetery
- Spouse: Mary Sinton Miner
- Children: Charlton Thomas Lewis
- Occupation: Lawyer, civil servant, author
- Known for: Abraham Lincoln biographer, Internal Revenue Service commissioner

Joseph Jackson Lewis (October 5, 1801 – April 5, 1883) was an American lawyer, civil servant, and author who published the first biography of Abraham Lincoln and served President Lincoln as the second U.S. Commissioner of Internal Revenue from March 1863 to July 1865. He was also a leading Pennsylvania Republican who represented antislavery figures in court.

== Early life and career ==
Lewis was born in Westtown Township, Chester County, Pennsylvania, to Enoch Lewis, a Quaker and abolitionist who taught mathematics at the Westtown School. Joseph Lewis followed in his father's footsteps as a teacher at Philadelphia and West Chester schools before reading law under James Kent in New York and joining the Chester County bar in 1825. He became a noted attorney and antislavery figure in Chester County, serving as deputy attorney general of Pennsylvania in 1844 and as burgess of West Chester in the 1840s. Lewis was one of four lawyers who successfully represented antislavery defendant Castner Hanway, who had fought with pro-slavery raiders, in trials following the Christiana Riot of 1851.

George W. Roberts, who became a Union Army colonel and died at the Battle of Stones River in 1862, read law with Lewis in 1857. So did Henry McIntire, a Union Army officer who was elected Chester County District Attorney in 1862.

== Lincoln biographer and politician ==
In 1860, Lewis's friend and fellow Chester County native Jesse W. Fell, one of Abraham Lincoln's closest friends who had been urging Lincoln to run for president, persuaded Lincoln to write up a two-and-a-half-page autobiographical sketch. Fell sent the manuscript to Lewis, who adapted it into a biographical article published in February 1860 in the Chester County Times. Widely reprinted in the Northern newspapers, this sketch was Lincoln’s first widely read biography. Later that year, Lewis proved instrumental in securing Pennsylvania's delegates for Lincoln at the 1860 Republican National Convention, collaborating with Wayne MacVeagh to arrange for Simon Cameron's delegates to vote for Lincoln after Cameron fell short of the nomination.

== Internal Revenue Service commissioner ==
As Lincoln's Internal Revenue Service commissioner tasked with collecting taxes and rigorously enforcing the nation's wartime tax laws, Lewis "framed the financial system which saved the nation in the Civil War." He succeeded Massachusetts politician George S. Boutwell as IRS commissioner in 1863, serving as acting commissioner from March 5 to March 17, 1863, and then as commissioner from March 18, 1863 to June 30, 1865. Lewis's accomplishments included implementing a progressive income tax, introducing tax withholding for federal employees, publicly publishing tax returns to pressure taxpayers into accurately reporting their incomes, and establishing a criminal investigation division.

== Personal life ==
Lewis was elected as a member to the American Philosophical Society in 1881. He was married to Mary Sinton Miner. His son was Charlton Thomas.
