= Gilbert Cope =

American historian and genealogist (1840–1928)

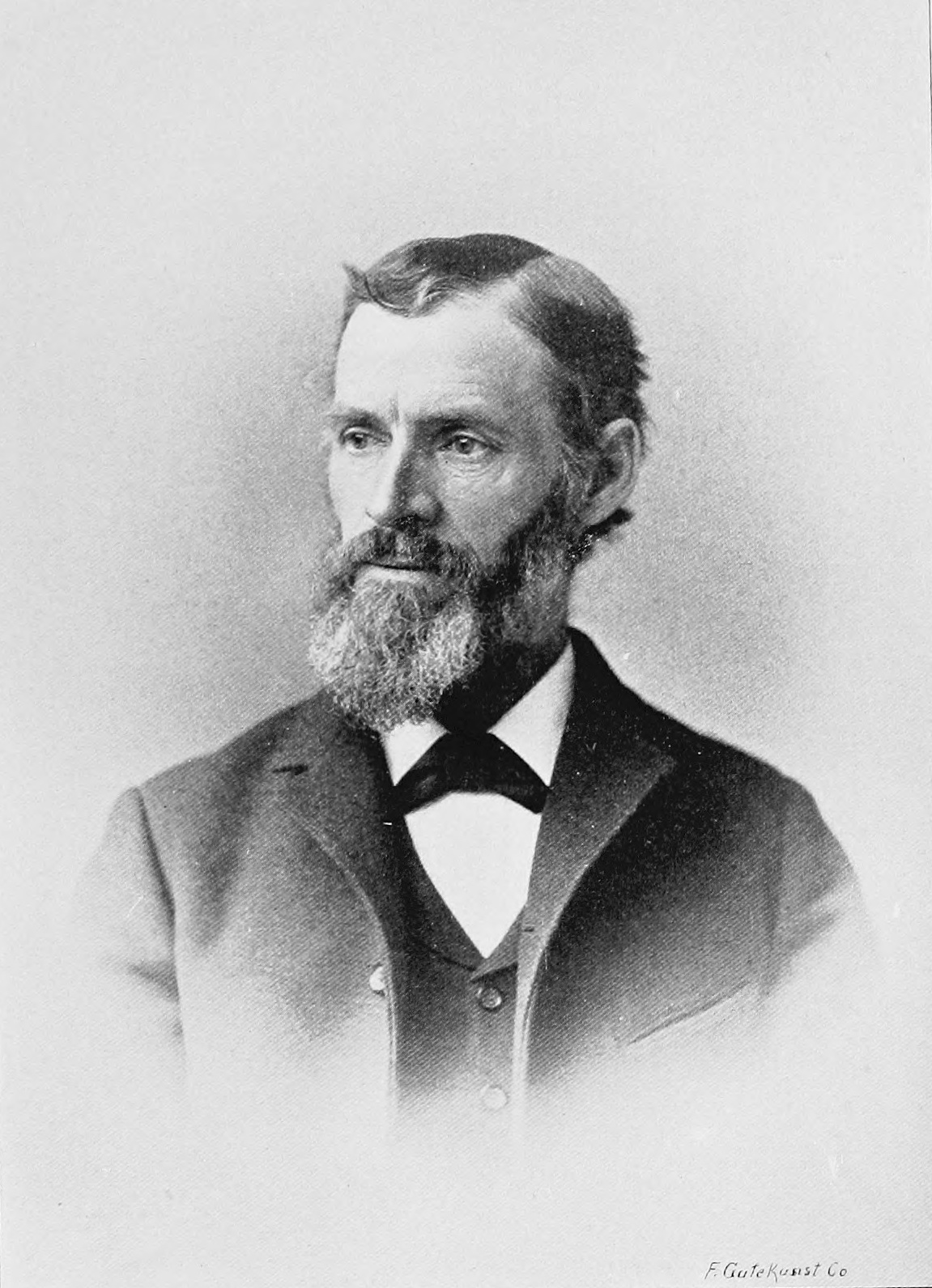
- Cope in 1898
- Born: August 17, 1840; East Bradford Township, Pennsylvania, U.S.
- Died: December 17, 1928 (aged 88); Middletown Township, Delaware County, Pennsylvania, U.S.
- Resting place: Orthodox Friends Cemetery, West Goshen Township, Pennsylvania
- Education: Westtown School
- Occupations: Historian, genealogist
- Known for: Leading historian of Chester County, Pennsylvania
- Relatives: Edward Drinker Cope (cousin)

Gilbert Cope (August 17, 1840 – December 17, 1928) was an American historian and genealogist who authored numerous publications on the history and prominent families of Chester County, Pennsylvania. His magnum opus was the History of Chester County, Pennsylvania, with Genealogical and Biographical Sketches (1881), coauthored with J. Smith Futhey. He collected enormous quantities of historical materials and manuscripts, now held by the Historical Society of Pennsylvania.

== Biography ==
Cope was born on August 17, 1840, in East Bradford Township, Pennsylvania, two miles west of the county seat of West Chester. He was the youngest of eight children born to Joseph Cope Jr. (1794–1870) and Eliza (Gilbert) Cope (1799–1862). His father—a strict disciplinarian in contrast to his kindly mother—was a wealthy Quaker farmer of English descent, whose paternal ancestor, Oliver Cope, was one of William Penn's First Purchasers, settling in the region in 1683 having previously been a tailor in Wiltshire. An Orthodox Friend like his ancestors, Gilbert attended the West Chester Friends School and the Westtown School.

From a young age, Cope was fascinated by botany and genealogy, using his own hand printing press to produce genealogical pamphlets and publishing his first book, a genealogy of his family, at the age of 21. When his father died, Gilbert sold the farm and moved to West Chester, where he built a new house at 532 North Church Street on the occasion of his marriage in 1880. He accrued extensive genealogical and historical collections, which he shelved in wooden cabinets of his own design or stored in a fireproof vault he built in his private library. He preserved most of Chester County's archives and Quaker meeting records, gathering and binding thousands of loose papers at his own expense. He also collected photographs and took many of his own photographs documenting historic buildings, landmark occasions, public events, and important documents. In 1905 and 1907, he and his wife spent nine months in London copying many volumes of the early Quaker registers of England and Wales.

In 1920, Cope went to live with his eldest son, Herman Cope, at Herman's farm in Middletown Township, Delaware County, Pennsylvania, and dispersed his collections to regional societies. The Historical Society of Pennsylvania purchased Cope's extensive historical and manuscript collections, including published books and newspapers, maps, photographs, prints, and other historical materials dating from the eighteenth and nineteenth centuries. His collection of genealogical materials (church records, headstone inscriptions, tax lists, etc.), filling several hundred volumes, went to the Genealogical Society of Pennsylvania, which later transferred most of them to the Historical Society of Pennsylvania.

In 1893, Cope co-founded the Chester County Historical Society and for twenty-seven years served as its secretary and on its board of directors, remaining an honorary director to the end of his life. In 1861 he became a corresponding member of the New England Historic Genealogical Society and the Historical Society of Pennsylvania. In 1912, his colleagues elected him an honorary member of the Genealogical Society of Pennsylvania, and in 1924 he was elected as honorary vice president. In 1911–12, he served as president of the Pennsylvania Federation of Historical Societies. He belonged to the Delaware Historical Society and the Friends Historical Association.

== Personal life and legacy ==
On February 5, 1880, Cope married Anna Garrett (1848–1918), daughter of David and Mary Ann (Hoopes) Garrett. The couple had three children who survived to adulthood: Herman, Joseph, and Ellen. Cope died at Herman's farm in Middletown Township on December 17, 1928, at the age of 88. He was interred by his wife's side in the Orthodox Friends Cemetery in West Goshen Township, just north of West Chester. Joseph Cope continued his father's genealogical researches until his own death in 1982.

Cope's fellow historian of southeastern Pennsylvania, Albert Cook Myers, described him as "pleasant and sociable in his quiet, unobtrusive way," albeit somewhat pedantic and prone to interrogate new acquaintances about their ancestry. Myers extolled him as "the grand old man of Chester County history."

Cope's papers are held in the archives of the Chester County History Center and the Historical Society of Pennsylvania.

He was a distant cousin of paleontologist Edward Drinker Cope.
