= Tom Bostelle =

American painter

Tom Bostelle (November 16, 1921 – February 17, 2005) was an American painter and sculptor.

== Career ==
A native of Chester County, Pennsylvania, Bostelle won an N.C. Wyeth prize from the Chester County Art Association while still very young. He credited Cézanne as a major influence in his early career, and also admired the work of artists as diverse as Giacometti, Jackson Pollock and Willem de Kooning.

In 1947, he had his first one-man exhibition and rose to prominence alongside Andrew Wyeth. The two artists—who lived only a couple of miles apart—frequently exhibited in the same shows.

His works are in the permanent collections of the )National Portrait Gallery Delaware Art Museum in Wilmington, Delaware, West Chester University in West Chester, Pa., the Brandywine River Museum in Chadds Ford, Pa.

== Collections ==
- Brandywine River Museum - "Lenape Jesus"
- National Portrait Gallery - portrait of Horace Pippin
- Delaware Art Museum - 32 works by Bostelle including "Century Piece"'
