= Washington Townsend =

American politician (1813–1894)

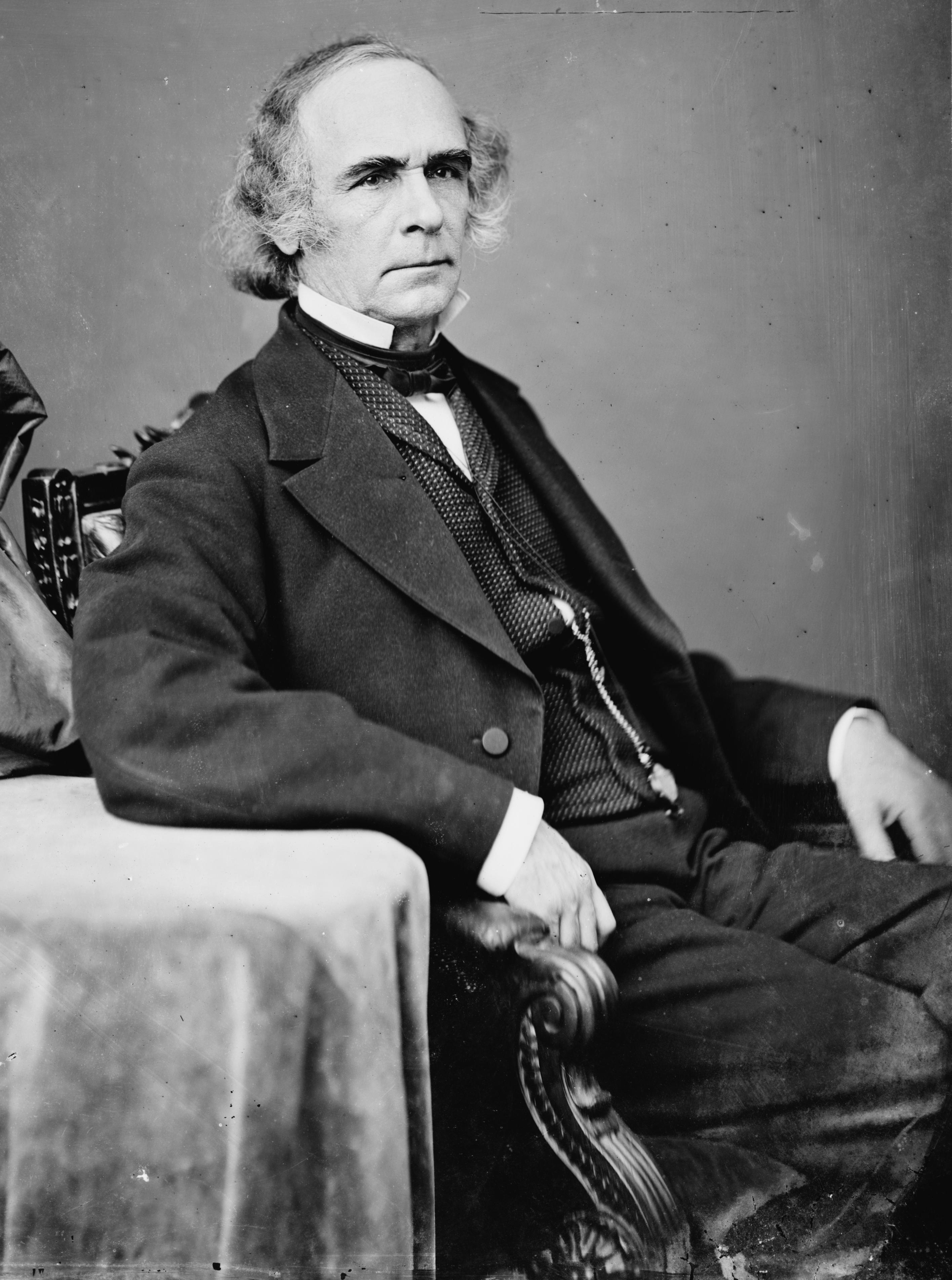
- Townsend, c. 1860–1875

Member of the U.S. House of Representatives from Pennsylvania
- In office March 4, 1869 – March 3, 1877
- Preceded by: John M. Broomall (7th); James S. Biery (6th)
- Succeeded by: Alan Wood Jr. (7th); William Ward (6th)
- Constituency: 7th district (1869-75); 6th district (1875-77)

Personal details
- Born: January 20, 1813 West Chester, Pennsylvania, U.S.
- Died: March 18, 1894 (aged 81) West Chester, Pennsylvania, U.S.
- Resting place: Oaklands Cemetery
- Party: Whig, Republican
- Spouse(s): Elizabeth Barnard; Elizabeth Gibbons
- Parent: David Townsend (father)
- Profession: Politician; lawyer

Washington Townsend (January 20, 1813 – March 18, 1894) was an American lawyer, banker, and politician who served four terms as a Republican member of the U.S. House of Representatives from Pennsylvania from 1869 to 1877.

== Early life ==
Washington Townsend was born in West Chester, Pennsylvania. His father was botanist David Townsend, co-founder and chief cashier of the Bank of Chester County. He attended a private school and West Chester Academy. He was engaged as a bank teller from 1828 to 1844. He studied law, was admitted to the bar in 1844 and commenced practice in West Chester.

=== Early career ===
He was prosecuting attorney of Chester County, Pennsylvania, in 1848. He served as deputy attorney under Attorneys General James Cooper and Cornelius Darragh. He was cashier of the Bank of Chester County from 1849 to 1857. He was a delegate to the Whig National Convention in 1852, and a delegate to the 1860 Republican National Convention.

He was elected as a member to the American Philosophical Society in 1882.

== Congress ==
Townsend was elected as a Republican to the Forty-first and to the three succeeding Congresses. He served as chairman of the United States House Committee on Public Lands during the Forty-third Congress. He was not a candidate for renomination in 1876.

== Later career ==
He again resumed the practice of his profession in West Chester, and served as president of the Bank of Chester County from 1879 to 1894.

== Death ==
He died in West Chester in 1894. Interment was in Oaklands Cemetery, near West Chester.

U.S. House of Representatives
Preceded by John M. Broomall	Member of the U.S. House of Representatives from Pennsylvania's 7th congressional district March 4, 1869 – March 3, 1875	Succeeded by Alan Wood, Jr.
Preceded by James S. Biery	Member of the U.S. House of Representatives from Pennsylvania's 6th congressional district March 4, 1875 – March 3, 1877	Succeeded by William Ward
