= History of West Chester, Pennsylvania =

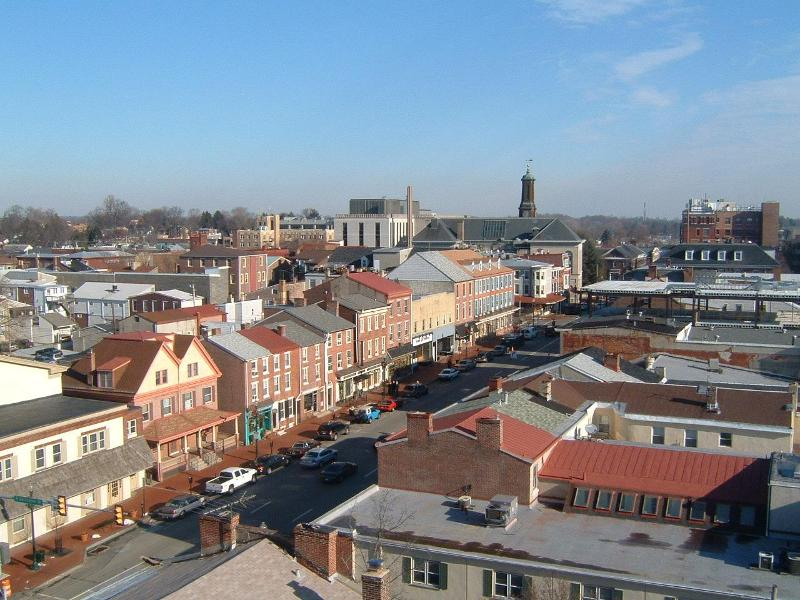
West Chester photographed in 2006

The history of West Chester, Pennsylvania, United States, began in 1762, when Phineas Eachus and Chest Weaterson were issued a license to build a tavern. The borough was incorporated in 1799. One of the nation's first railroads was built in West Chester in 1832, and a prominent courthouse, designed by Thomas U. Walter, was completed in 1847. The first biography of Abraham Lincoln was published in the borough. Thanks to the Sharples Separator Works, West Chester became a major industrial town at the turn of the 20th century. During World War II, West Chester produced more penicillin than anywhere else in the country.

== 18th century ==
Native Americans camped at what is now West Chester, and eight campsites have been discovered. Nathaniel Puckle, a ship captain, was deeded a large plot of land by William Penn in 1701 that includes parts of present-day West Chester. The Haines family purchased a tract of land shortly thereafter that also encompassed a portion of the borough. In 1760, there were four farms at the intersection of the road from Pottstown to Wilmington (currently High Street) and the road from Philadelphia to the Brandywine Creek (currently Gay Street).

In 1762, Phineas Eachus was issued a license to build a tavern in what is now West Chester. It was apparently nameless until August 1768, when John Clark purchased the tavern and called it Turk's Head Inn. A small crossroads village developed around the tavern bearing the Turk's Head name. On September 11, 1777, the Battle of Brandywine was fought several miles from the Turk's Head village. A schoolhouse at what is now High and Gay Streets served as a hospital for recovering Colonial soldiers. A small skirmish between the British and Colonial troops took place shortly after the battle.

The Pennsylvania General Assembly authorized John Hannum III, Isaac Taylor, and John Jacobs to build a new courthouse and prison for Chester County and sell the old courthouse in Chester on March 22, 1784. Work began on a new courthouse in Turk's Head in the summer of 1784. Chester saloonkeeper John Harper, unhappy with the splitting of Delaware County from Chester County, led a militia with the intent of destroying the unfinished courthouse in 1785. Bringing a cannon, muskets, and whiskey, Harper's men were ready to fight. They eventually gave up their pursuit after being stopped by a group of men led by Hannum. On November 28, 1786, Turk's Head officially became Chester County's seat of justice after a court session was held there. A post office was established in 1791.

Hannum renamed Turk's Head West Chester and began selling lots along Gay Street. By 1795, he had mapped out the original streets – Church, High, Gay, Market, Chestnut, and Walnut. On March 28, 1799, West Chester was incorporated as a borough from Goshen Township land by an act of the state legislature. Burgesses now were required to lead municipal affairs, and the first burgess to be elected was William Sharpless. West Chester Fire Company was established later in the year. As of the 1800 census, West Chester had a population of 374.

== 19th century ==
A small marketplace was created in 1802, but was rarely occupied. In 1809, Dr. William Darlington established the first foot pavement in town, although sidewalks would not become widespread until several years later. The West Chester Academy, the antecedent to the modern West Chester University, was founded in 1813 and went on to educate many prominent Chester County citizens. Its first teachers were John Gemmil and Jonathan Gause. A boarding school for girls was established sixteen years later. To serve the needs of local farmers, the Agricultural Society of Chester County was founded in 1820. William Darlington established a natural history society in 1826. In 1829, William Everhart began selling off some of his property at the southwest corner of the town, and several additional streets were opened. Around this time, ornamental shade trees were planted on streets to improve the scenery. By 1830, 1,244 people resided in the borough.

Before 1832, the only route to Philadelphia was through wagon roads, which hampered local farmers from selling produce to Philadelphians. West Chester Railroad tracks were completed in September 1832, and the railroad used horses to pull wagons to what is now Malvern and eventually Philadelphia. A trip on the railroad lasted approximately three hours, much faster than the all-day trek by wagon, and it facilitated trade in perishable goods by West Chester-area farmers. A second railroad to Media was completed in 1858.

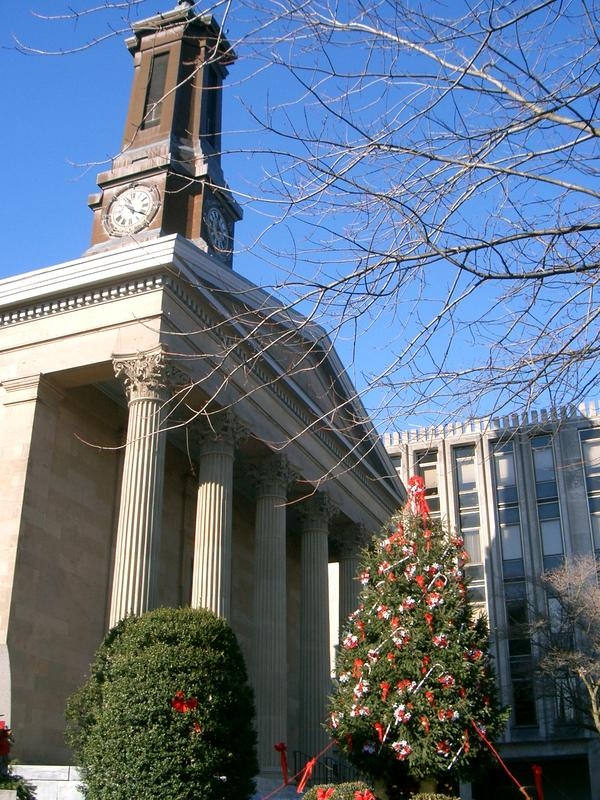
The Chester County Courthouse was designed by Thomas U. Walter and completed in 1847.

With the development of West Chester, renowned architect Thomas U. Walter, who designed the United States Capitol, was commissioned to build several important buildings. He designed the Chester County Courthouse, Horticultural Hall (currently the headquarters for the Chester County History Center), the Bank of Chester County, and several churches. The Bank of Chester County was completed in 1837 for $30,000. Work on the courthouse began in the spring of 1846 after it was determined that the 1786 courthouse was inadequate. The Greek Revival structure was completed in the fall of 1847 for $55,346. Courts of common pleas began on October 25, and the move to the new courthouse was complete by December. Historians Gilbert Cope and J. Smith Futhey lauded the structure as "worthy of the tastes and resources of this ancient county."

In 1853, Josiah Hoopes began selling plants on the family farm just north of West Chester, and after several years, he began selling fruit trees. He named the nursery the Cherry Hill Nursery in 1855 and partnered with his brother Abner in 1857 to open a stall in the borough. The business steadily grew into one of the largest in West Chester. In 1857, in West Chester, in addition to the nursery, there were three harness shops, nine blacksmiths, nine wheelwrights, six coopers, and two dozen grocers.

The only American-born Impressionist painter, Mary Cassatt, spent a year of her childhood in West Chester in 1855. The three-story Greek Revival house her father rented still stands on the southeast corner of High and Miner Streets. Cassatt was a contemporary of Renoir, Monet, and Pissarro and was close friends with Edgar Degas. Her paintings hang in the National Gallery, the Metropolitan Museum of Art, the Philadelphia Museum of Art, the Baltimore Museum of Art, the Pennsylvania Academy of the Fine Arts, and nearly a hundred other museums and public galleries throughout the world.

There was a great deal of antislavery sentiment in the years leading up to the American Civil War. Many prominent citizens had houses that were "stations" on the Underground Railroad to Canada. Prominent abolitionists such as William Lloyd Garrison, Wendell Phillips, and Lucretia Mott spoke at meetings in West Chester. However, the citizenry of West Chester was not unanimous in its Whig or Republican views. In 1854, an editorial column in the Chester County Times stated, "the people are thoroughly sick of the incessant negro agitation, and were it not for the political aspirants and office seekers for places of profit by playing the harlequin to other men's consciences, we should have less of it."

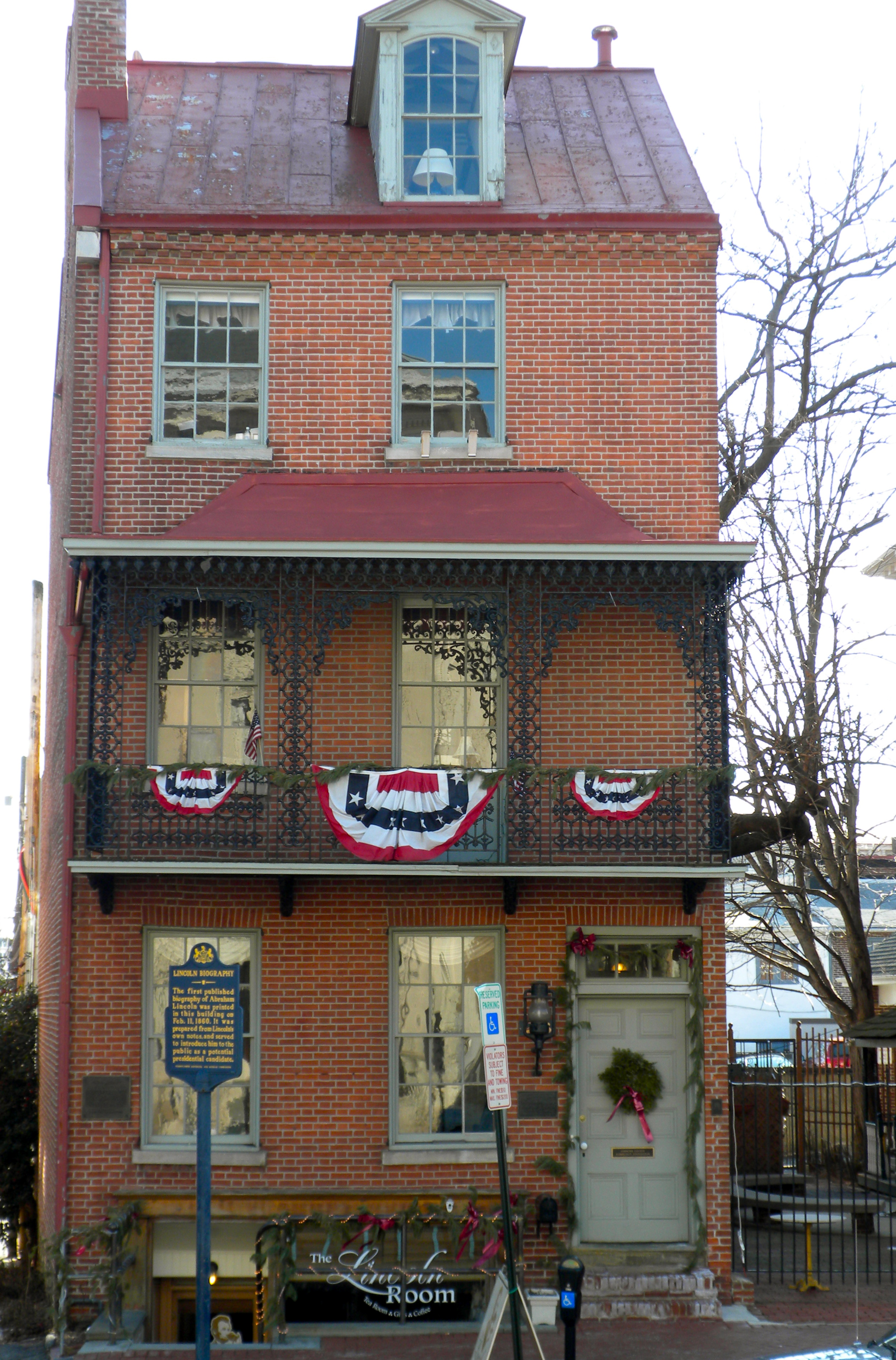
The first biography of Abraham Lincoln was written in this building.

Chester County native Jesse W. Fell asked Abraham Lincoln for an autobiographical narrative in 1858. Lincoln initially refused, but eventually wrote a 606-word account, explaining that “there is not much of it, for the reason, I suppose, that there is not much of me.” Fell sent this sketch to his friend Joseph J. Lewis in West Chester. Lewis embellished on the short account and published the biography in the Chester County Times on February 11, 1860. The first published biography of Lincoln, it was circulated in newspapers across the U.S. and was considered crucial in securing the Republican nomination by Lincoln himself. The building that it was written in is today known as the Lincoln Building.

When the American Civil War commenced, a training camp was established in West Chester, and the Union army recruited heavily in the region. Named Camp Wayne in 1861 after Revolutionary War general Anthony Wayne, it was situated at the corner of Church Street and Rosedale Avenue. Critics complained about the poor location as a strategic point, but supporters praised its flat terrain and open space. In any case, the Ninth Regiment, with three Chester County companies, arrived at the camp on May 4, 1861, although some men were forced to temporarily lodge at the courthouse. The 97th regiment was formed by local businessman Henry Ruhl Guss and trained at the camp, and 143 of its 950 men were from West Chester. The Village Record reported on January 18, 1862, that threats of arson at Camp Wayne forced its commanders to take it down. A second camp, named Camp Elder, was formed in West Chester in 1863 as a recruiting point for black soldiers. However, it became a parole camp after the Battle of Gettysburg, and 2,000 Union soldiers were sent there to work on farms for three months while awaiting exchange.

On April 29, 1869, a meeting was held concerning the future of the West Chester Academy. At a second meeting that was held at the courthouse on August 23 of that year, a resolution was adopted that would turn the academy into a normal school. The Pennsylvania General Assembly passed an act on March 4, 1870, concerning the foundation of a normal school, and on September 14, the cornerstone at the main building was laid. On June 20, 1871, the board of trustees chose Ezekiel Cook to be the first principal. The school opened on September 25 of that year to an inaugural class of 130 students.

After moving to the borough in 1867, William and Thomas Hoopes (distant cousins of Josiah and Abner) established a spoke works. They purchased a site on Market Street from a coal yard operator and opened for business in September 1867, though they were not immediately successful. They invited their relative Edward S. Darlington to join the firm and began manufacturing complete sets of wheels in 1869. About a hundred men were employed in various capacities by the spoke works by 1872, such as cutting, hauling, and turning wood with circular saws. Exports of their products reached as far as Europe and the Pacific Coast. With the panic of 1873, profits suffered, and the firm accused the West Chester Railroad of price gouging. Despite threatening to move the factory to Chester or Philadelphia, the Hoopes Brothers & Darlington (as the firm was known) stayed put, and the business recovered by 1880. The firm merged with fourteen other companies to form the American Wheel Company in 1889, but the Hoopes Brothers and Darlington bought out their share in 1892. The company began producing wooden bicycle wheels in 1894.

Meanwhile, after purchasing a 44-acre tract and taking on George P. Thomas as an accountant, the Cherry Hill Nursery began to rake in profits. After the Civil War, the company employed more than a hundred people. The firm's office was completed in 1880. Designed by a Philadelphia architect, the building was decorated with flower gardens and became a showplace for the borough. By the following year, the brothers owned and farmed 300 acres around West Chester. In addition, they owned several greenhouses in town. The Hoopes brothers changed the name of the company to the Maple Avenue Nurseries in 1885. In 1898, West Chester was the largest producer of peach trees in the United States thanks to Maple Avenue. In addition to drawing business to West Chester, Josiah Hoopes also designed the benches and fountains at Marshall Square Park and served on the board of trustees at the West Chester State Normal School.

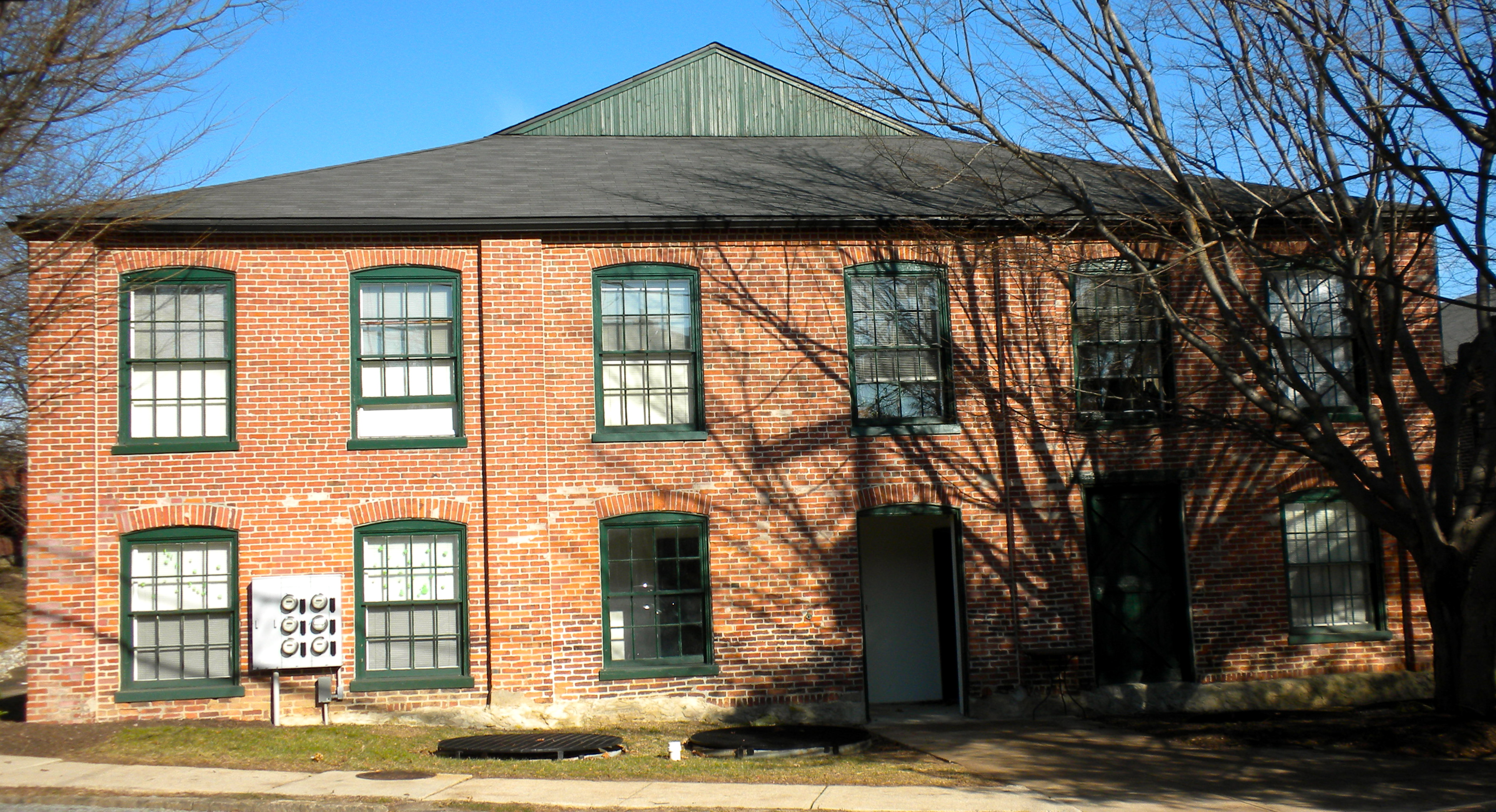
Sharples Separator Works

The third major industry in West Chester in the late 1800s was the Sharples Separator Works. Philip M. Sharples built a shop in April 1881 and built a wide range of items using wood or metal, including farm machinery and steam engines. He began manufacturing cream separators in 1883, which became his most profitable product. In 1889, he moved into a new factory on Maple Avenue that eventually employed 600 workers and produced 3,700 cream separators annually. After being sued in 1893, Sharples acquired a patent for his cream separator in 1897. Sharples added innovations like electric lighting, fire alarms, and steam whistles and helped transform West Chester into a major industrial hub. By the 1900 census, West Chester's population had expanded to 9,524 and was the largest town in Chester County, with approximately 10 percent of its population.

Civil rights leader Frederick Douglass was a frequent visitor to the West Chester area. He often lodged at the Magnolia House, an inn owned by Moses Hepburn, who became West Chester's first African American borough councilor in 1882. On February 1, 1895, Douglass delivered a public lecture at the West Chester Normal School. The speech was entitled "Against Lynch Law". It was to be his last public appearance, as he died on February 20.

== 20th century ==
In 1903, the Hoopes Brothers and Darlington became incorporated and sold shares to the public. They were the third largest manufacturer of wheels in the world in 1907. After the introduction of the Model T Ford and the paving of the road to Philadelphia (now West Chester Pike) in 1906, automobiles became popular in West Chester and the surrounding areas. In June 1909, the Hoopes Brothers and Darlington announced that they were adding automobile wheels to their line of products.

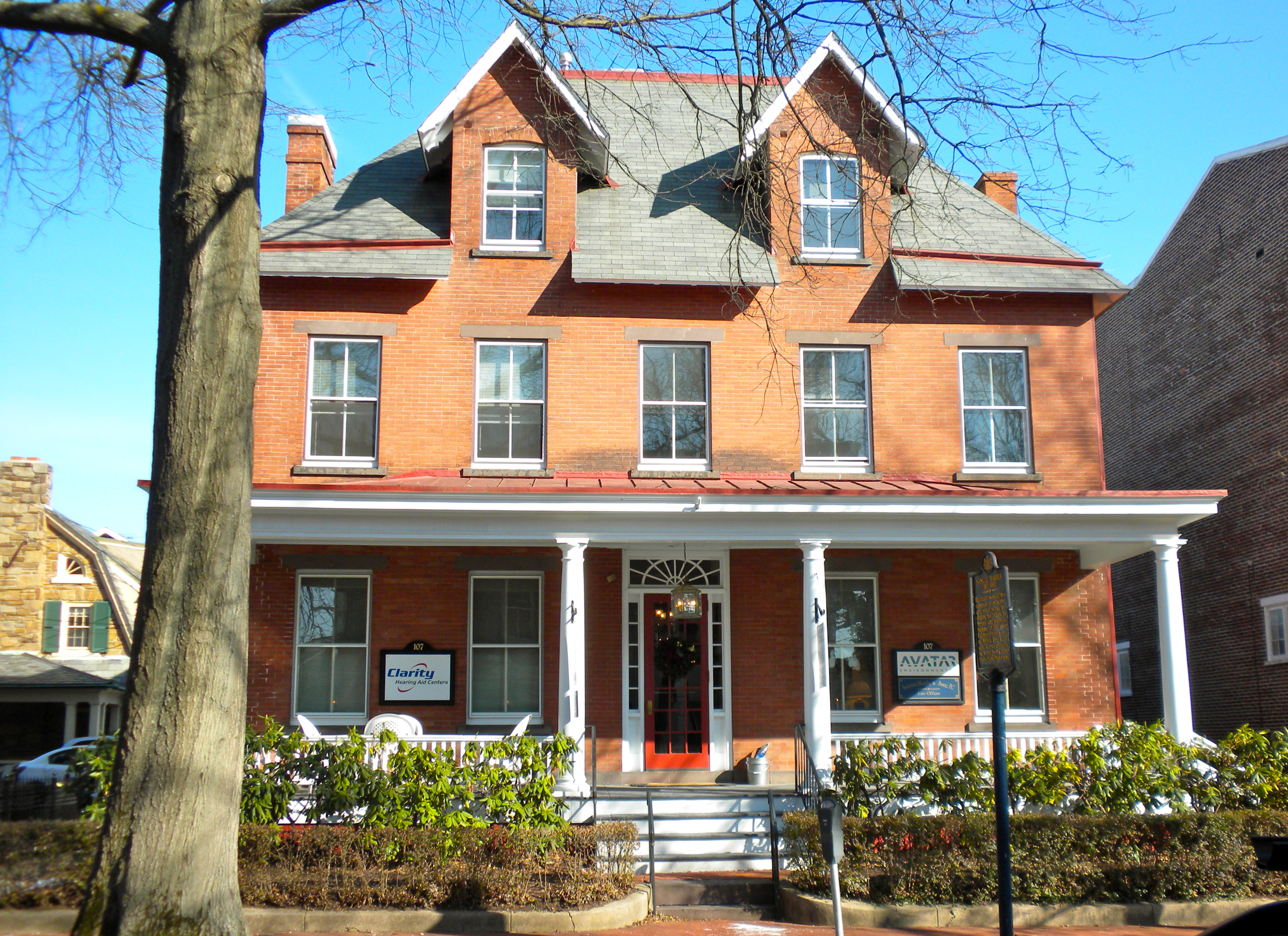
Acclaimed composer Samuel Barber grew up in this house on Church Street.

The acclaimed composer Samuel Barber was born in West Chester on March 9, 1910. "In the mid-nineteenth century, West Chester had been an affluent industrial town," writes biographer Barbara Heyman, "but by the turn of the century, what remained as a reminder of former wealth were gracious large homes, enhanced with ornate cupolas, pillared doorways, and grand lawns." He was the only son of Daisy and Dr. Roy Barber, considered two of the best-known people in West Chester according to a 1908 West Chester Daily Local News article. Samuel Barber began composing songs at the age of six and was recognized as a musical prodigy. He started playing recitals at West Chester's First Presbyterian Church in 1920, performing Bach, Tchaikovsky, and Beethoven tunes as well as his own compositions, before entering the Curtis Institute in 1924.

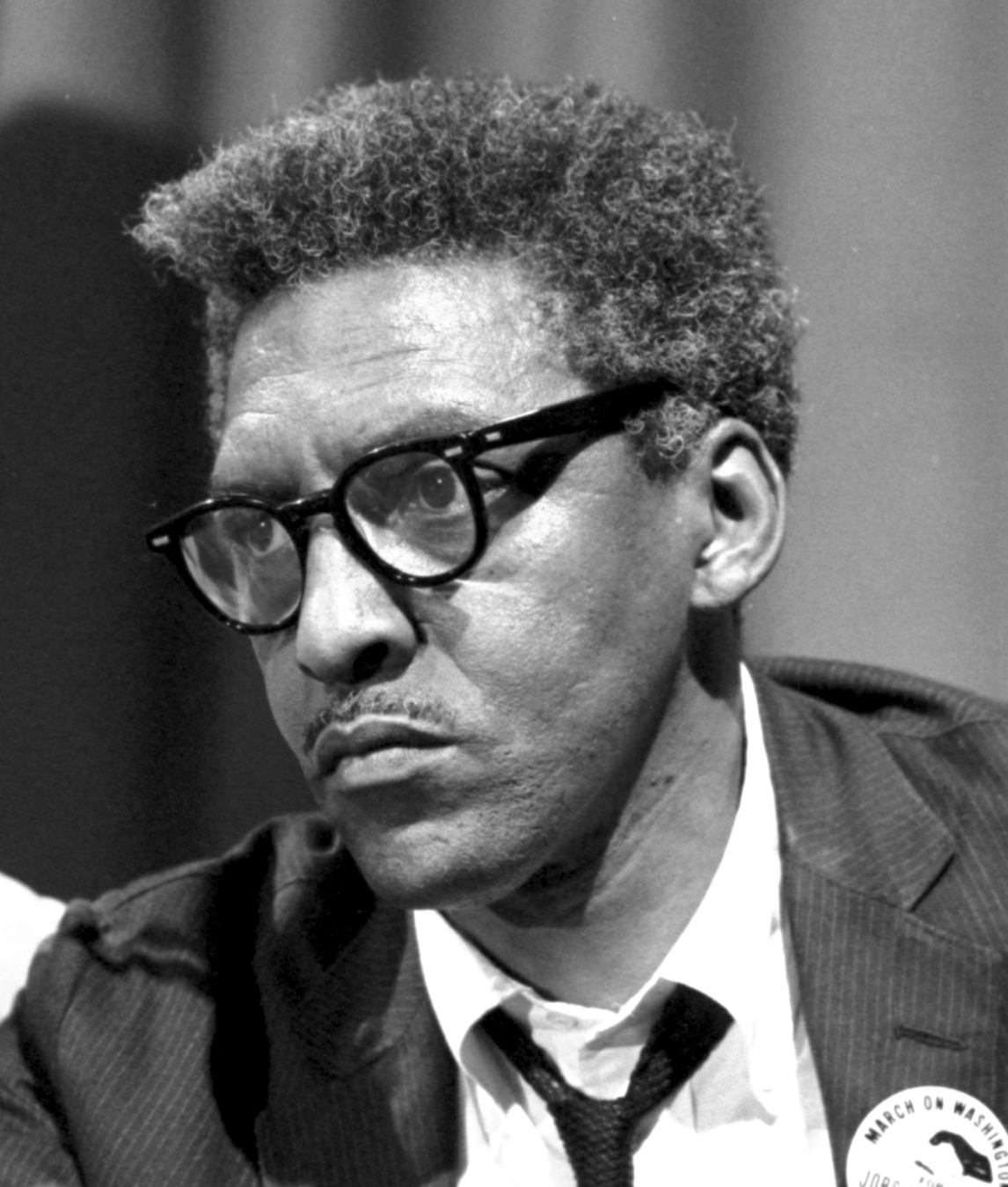
Civil rights advocate Bayard Rustin was born in West Chester on March 17, 1912.

Prominent civil rights leader and organizer of the March on Washington Bayard Rustin was born in West Chester on March 17, 1912, two years after Barber. He never knew his father, and his 15-year-old mother, Florence, gave parental responsibilities to her parents, Janifer and Julia Rustin. Bayard Rustin would regard Janifer and Julia Rustin as his parents for the rest of his life. According to biographer Jerald Podair, "West Chester during the 1910s was a segregated town, in which certain public facilities, like theaters, were open to African Americans on a limited basis, and others—notably restaurants and downtown stores—weren't open to African Americans at all." Historian Daniel Levine acknowledges that West Chester, "although by no means free of racism, was more benign than most places." Rustin grew up in the predominantly African-American east end of town, where Leslie Pinckney Hill founded a community center (now the Charles A. Melton Arts and Education Center) in 1918. After graduating from West Chester High School in 1932, Rustin entered Wilberforce University.

The Sharples Separator Works began experiencing troubles in the 1920s. Philip M. Sharples resigned in 1925 after a large layoff of workers. His son Philip T. Sharples succeeded him as head of the company, and in 1926 shut down production of milk machines. The company managed to survive by building refrigerators and electric generators. With the 1929 stock market crash, the Sharples Separator Works was forced to call in loans from debtors. Vice President Fred Wood urged the federal government to raise tariffs on European products in December 1929. Due to the effects of the Great Depression, the firm went out of business on March 29, 1933. The Sharples-owned Farmers and Mechanics Building, which cost over $100,000 to construct, was sold to the Daily Local News for $30,000. Wood and Anne Fitzpatrick formed the United Dairy Equipment Company out of the remains of the separator works.

During World War II, West Chester was the center of penicillin production. West Chester-born chemist G. Raymond Rettew became locally famous in the 1930s through breeding mushroom spawn. After the Pearl Harbor attacks, Rettew turned his attention toward penicillin as an antibiotic and built a laboratory in a converted auto garage in West Chester. Prior to his work, penicillin was mainly seen as a laboratory curiosity. In a partnership with Wyeth Pharmaceuticals, Rettew constructed a new building with refrigerators and a 100-gallon tank to aid mass production. Rettew delivered his first batch to the government in June 1943, and over 90 percent was delivered to the military. In November 1943, Rettew was producing 32,000 cultures every day. Throughout the war, Rettew's laboratory produced more penicillin than anywhere else in the world and saved an estimated 100,000 American lives. On May 7, 1944, a military plane crashed at Oaklands Cemetery outside West Chester, killing seven.

West Chester elementary schools were desegregated in 1948, thanks to the efforts of Charles and Unise Porter, the parents of African-American first-grader Gregory Porter.

The West Chester Normal School became West Chester State Teachers College in 1926. It again changed its name to West Chester State College in 1960. Amid widespread unrest in the wake of the Vietnam War, a female student set herself on fire in November 1965. Before she died, she stated that it was for personal reasons and was not a protest of the war. In 1983, the institution became West Chester University of Pennsylvania.

== 21st century ==
On October 2, 2013, West Chester University unveiled a bronze statue honoring Frederick Douglass, who delivered his last public speech on the university's campus less than three weeks before his death. The sculpture was designed by art professor Richard Blake. "This is a very important moment in the history of West Chester University," said university president Greg Weisenstein. "We as a campus community are dedicated to Frederick Douglass' message of freedom and inclusiveness. The statue in the plaza will always serve as a reminder of our steadfast commitment to inclusion and equity for all of the members of our campus community."

== See also ==
- Pennsylvania Woman's Convention at West Chester in 1852
