= G. Raymond Rettew =

American chemist and penicillin manufacturer (1903–1973)

Granville Raymond Rettew
- Born: April 19, 1903; West Chester, Pennsylvania, US
- Died: June 24, 1973 (aged 70); Pocono Lake Preserve, Pennsylvania, US
- Education: University of Delaware; Swarthmore College
- Occupation(s): Chemist, manufacturer
- Employer: Wyeth
- Known for: Pioneering mass production of pencillin during World War II

Granville Raymond Rettew (April 19, 1903 – June 24, 1973), known as G. Raymond Rettew, was an American chemist and mushroom spawn cultivator from Pennsylvania who pioneered the mass production of penicillin, the world’s first antibiotic. His methods helped save the lives of tens of thousands of wounded American and Allied troops during World War II.

== Early life and education ==
Rettew was born in West Chester to parents Granville L. and Jane (Liggett) Rettew. He studied chemistry at the University of Delaware and transferred to Swarthmore College, where he flunked mandatory German classes and never received his degree. He worked briefly at his father's law firm and at a root beer manufacturer.

== Mushroom cultivation ==
In 1928, Rettew went into business with Joseph Strode, a friend who owned a meatpacking company. With Strode's capital and Rettew's chemistry expertise, they co-founded Chester County Mushroom Laboratories and pioneered the sterile production of mushroom spawn, within three years becoming the largest supplier in the United States. As the business flourished, Rettew published a guide to mushroom culture, patented a special wide-mouthed jar to cultivate spawn, and pioneered the freezing and canning of mushrooms in consultation with Clarence Birdseye. As World War II approached and rationing of so-called nonessential foods loomed over his business, Rettew successfully lobbied to get mushrooms declared essential. The Mushroom Growers’ Association gave him a special recognition and $1,000 for this achievement.

== Penicillin production ==
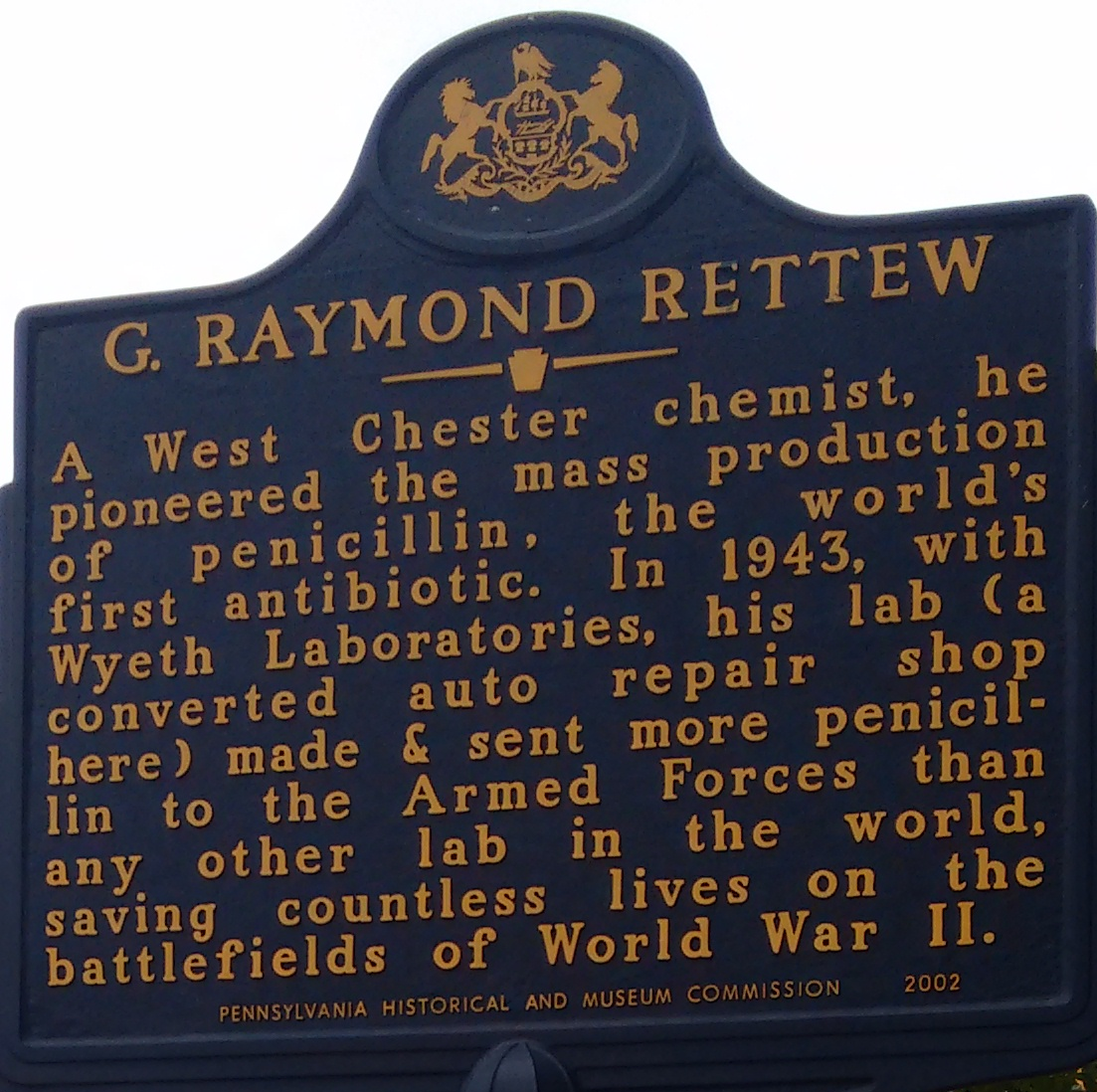
Pennsylvania state historical marker memorializing Rettew

In 1942, Rettew learned about the healing properties of penicillin, a substance from Penicillum mold and discovered in 1928 by Alexander Fleming in London. As the war loomed and the need for penicillin to treat Allied troops became clear, Rettew and Strode partnered with Reichel Laboratories of Phoenixville (Reichel was acquired by Wyeth Pharmaceuticals in late 1943) to pursue large-scale penicillin production using his fungiculture expertise. With his assistant, Charles Heathcote of the West Chester State Teachers College faculty, Rettew invented a technique of blending banana oil with penicillin cultures and using a Sharples cream separator to separate the constituents of these cultures. The US government received his first shipment of penicillin in June 1943. By November, Rettew's plant in West Chester was producing 32,000 penicillin cultures daily—more than any other maker in the world. He became Wyeth's director of penicillin production, ramping up production in facilities worldwide. His methods are credited with saving the lives of tens of thousands of wounded American and Allied troops during World War II. To commemorate Rettew's achievements, the Pennsylvania Historical and Museum Commission erected a state historical marker in West Chester on September 17, 2002.

== Personal life ==
Rettew died on June 24, 1973, at his Pocono Lake Preserve home. His wife, Helen (Divine) Rettew, survived him.

== Publications ==
- Rettew, Granville Raymond (1974). Robinson, Mary E. G. (ed.). "A Quiet Man from West Chester": Memoirs. West Chester, PA: Chester County Historical Society. OCLC 1009869.
- Rettew, Granville Raymond; Thompson, Forrest Grant (1948). Manual of Mushroom Culture. Toughkenamon, PA: Mushroom Supply Company. OCLC 2481309.
