= Philip M. Sharples =

American inventor and industrialist (1857–1944)

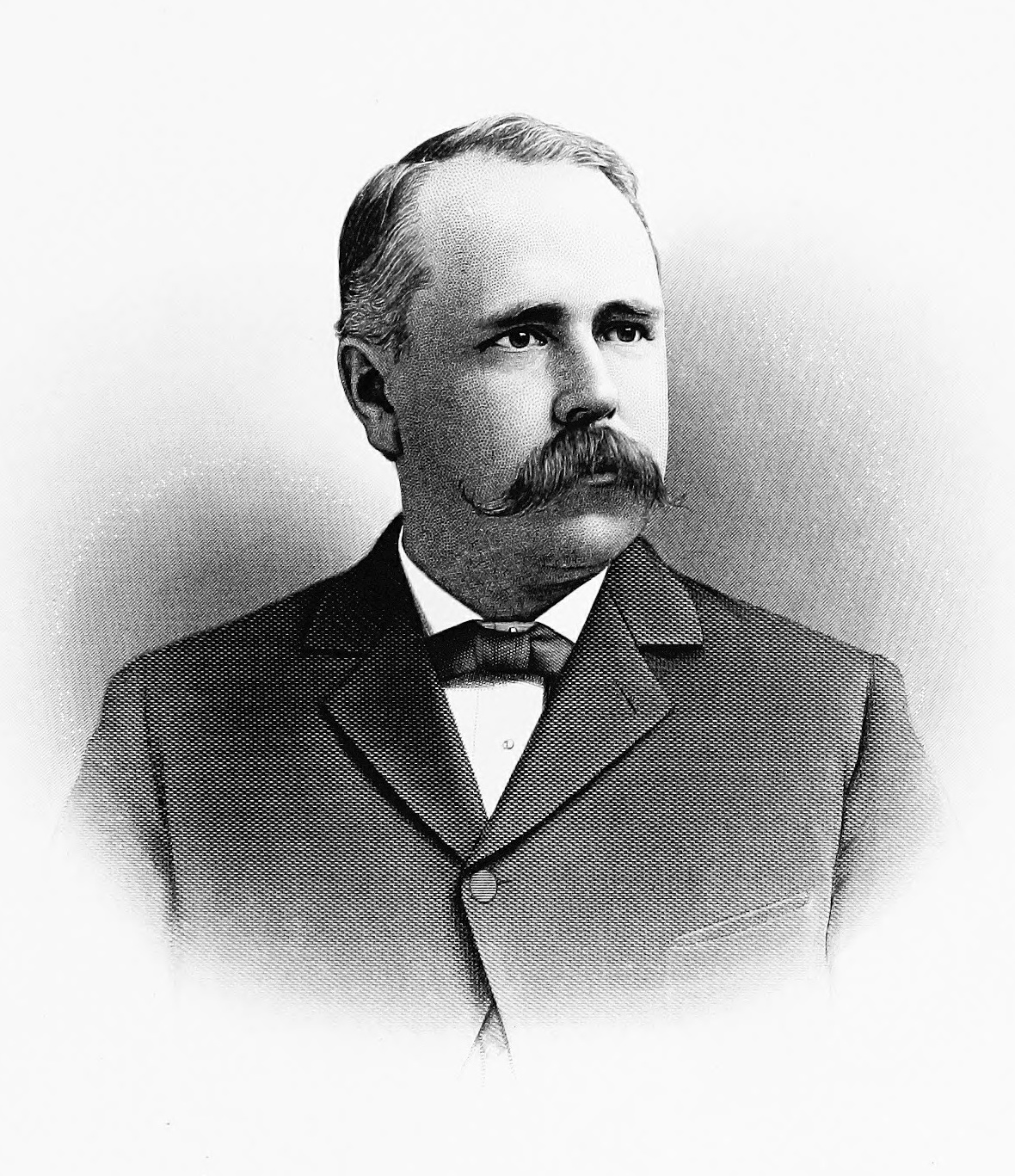
- Sharples in 1898
- Born: August 10, 1857; West Chester, Pennsylvania, US
- Died: April 13, 1944 (aged 86); Pasadena, California, US
- Education: West Chester Normal School
- Occupation(s): Inventor, industrialist
- Organization: Sharples Separator Works
- Known for: Inventing and manufacturing cream separators

Signature
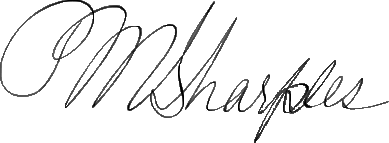

Philip M. Sharples (August 10, 1857 – April 13, 1944) was an American inventor and industrialist whose Sharples Tubular Centrifugal Separator was the first cream separator invented in the United States. He ran the largest industrial enterprise in the history of West Chester, Pennsylvania. His factory was listed on the National Register of Historic Places in 1984.

== Early life and education ==
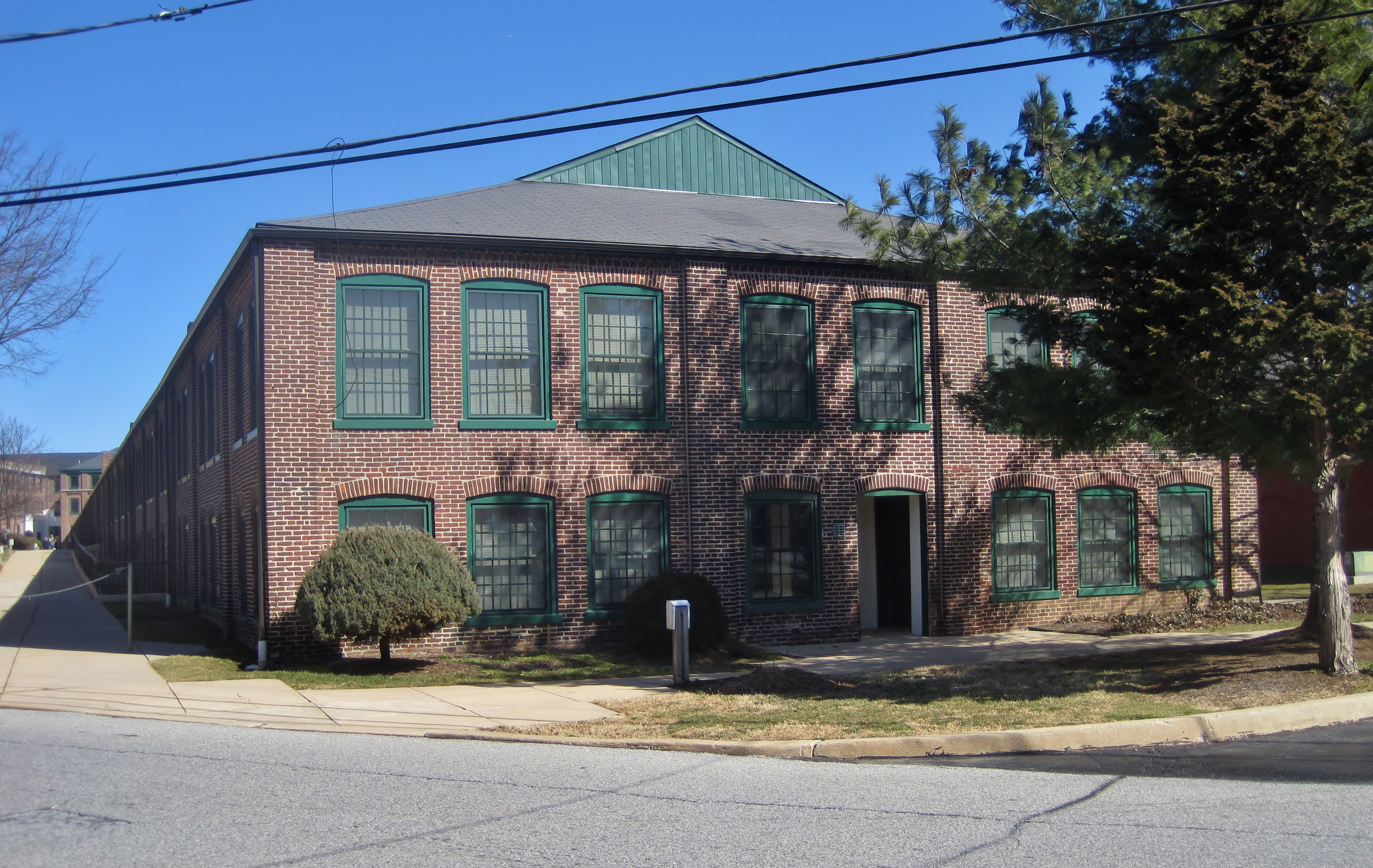
Sharples Separator Works in 2013

Sharples was born in West Chester, attended West Chester Normal School, apprenticed himself to a machinist for four years, and ran a successful machine shop in town. His Quaker family had been wealthy and influential in the region for generations—one of his ancestors, William Sharples, had been the first burgess of West Chester when the borough was incorporated.

== Business career ==
In 1883, Sharples traveled to Sweden and obtained a franchise to produce and sell DeLaval's cream separators. He improved the product and began manufacturing and selling his own design. By 1906, his firm had opened offices in Illinois and California and sold separators in Europe, Argentina, Australia, and Japan. At its height, Sharples Separator Works on Maple Avenue in West Chester covered five acres, employed one thousand workers, and produced 3,700 separators a year. The firm spun off subsidiaries and invested in a quarry and coal mine near Phoenixville. Sharples also fended off 23 intellectual property infringement lawsuits from DeLaval between 1890 and 1919. With his wealth, he built a mansion called Greystone Hall. He was a long-time trustee of Swarthmore College and co-founded the Farmers and Mechanics' Trust Company in West Chester.

Sharples retired in 1925. The company he founded went bankrupt in 1933 due to the effects of the Great Depression.

== Personal life ==
Sharples was married to Helen E. (Brinton) Sharples and had four children with her: Helen, Emlen, Philip, and Laurence. His wife died in 1911. Sharples died in Pasadena, California, on April 13, 1944, at the age of 86.
