= United States Post Office (West Chester, Pennsylvania) =

Historic post office in Pennsylvania

- US Post Office-West Chester
- U.S. Historic district – Contributing property
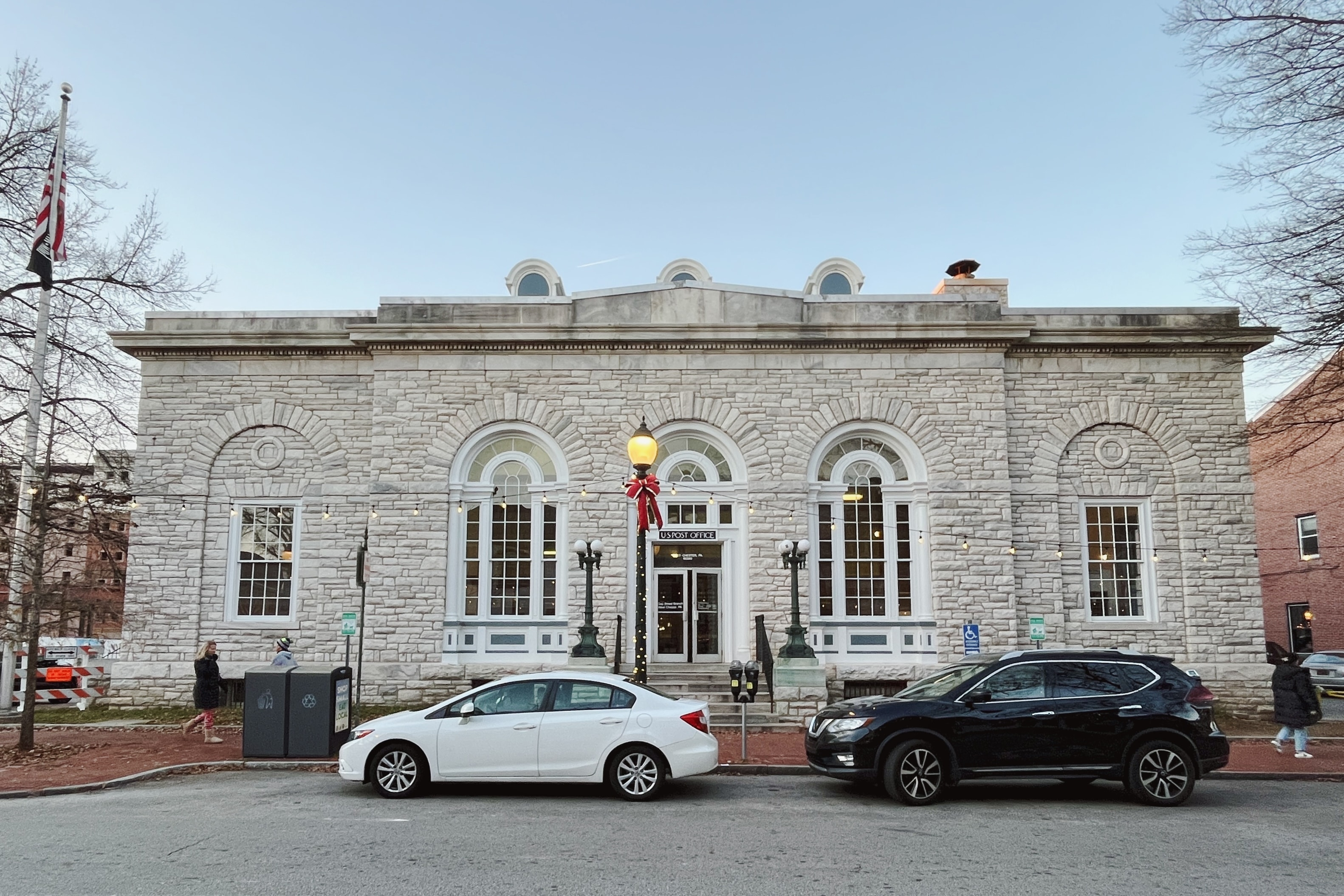

- Location within Pennsylvania Location within the United States
- Location: 101 E Gay St., West Chester, Pennsylvania
- Coordinates: 39.9613°N 75.6038°W
- Built: 1907
- Architect: James Knox Taylor
- Architectural style: Neoclassical
- Part of: West Chester Downtown Historic District (ID85001447)

US Post Office-West Chester, also called the Robert J. Thompson Post Office Building, is a historic post office located in West Chester, Chester County, Pennsylvania. It was designed by architect James Knox Taylor for the Office of the Supervising Architect, and built in 1907 in the neoclassical style. It was constructed with Cockeysville Marble taken from a quarry near Avondale, Pennsylvania. Thirty years later, the post office was expanded with an addition to the rear of the building, increasing its size to 20,000 square feet (1,900 m^{2}).

It was listed on the National Register of Historic Places as part of the West Chester Downtown Historic District in 1985.

In 2006, Congress passed Public Law 109-336, naming the building after Robert J. Thompson, a former Pennsylvania State Senator.

In 2013, the West Chester post office was one of the buildings being considered for sale by the United States Postal Service, though as of 2023 it is still a functioning post office.

== See also ==
- National Register of Historic Places listings in eastern Chester County, Pennsylvania
