= William W. Jefferis =

American mineralogist (1820–1906)

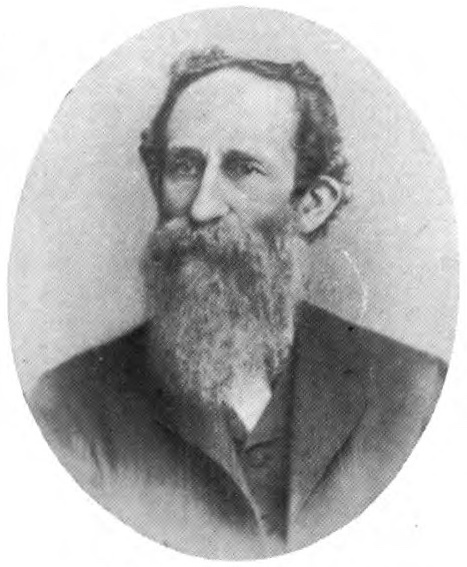
- Born: William Walter Jefferis; January 12, 1820; West Chester, Pennsylvania, U.S.
- Died: February 23, 1906 (aged 86); New York City, U.S.
- Resting place: Oaklands Cemetery
- Occupations: Mineralogist; curator; banker
- Employer(s): Bank of Chester County; Academy of Natural Sciences
- Known for: Mineral collecting
- Spouse: Elmira Cherrington (died 1881)
- Children: 4

William Walter Jefferis (January 12, 1820 – February 23, 1906) was an American mineralogist and curator of the William S. Vaux Collection of minerals and artifacts at the Philadelphia Academy of Natural Sciences from 1883 to 1898. He personally collected and cataloged 35,000 mineral specimens, which he sold to the Carnegie Museum of Natural History in 1905.

== Life and career ==
Jefferis was born in West Chester, Pennsylvania, on January 12, 1820. He was the second child and eldest son of seven children born to Horatio Townsend Jefferis and Hannah (Paul) Jefferis. His father worked as a teller for the Bank of Chester County, and the family lived on downtown High Street. He attended the West Chester Academy under Jonathan Gause.

Jefferis joined his father's bank as a clerk in 1843. He rose through the ranks and eventually worked as cashier (second in charge) at the Bank of Chester County from November 1, 1857, to June 3, 1883, succeeding David and Washington Townsend. Notably, he settled the affairs of West Chester's Bank of Brandywine, which opened its doors in 1871 and failed in 1875 due to the Panic of 1873. He was serving as a warden of the Episcopalian Church of the Holy Trinity in West Chester as of 1881.

In 1883, Jefferis retired from the bank after forty years of service and moved to Philadelphia. He traveled twice to England and Continental Europe, touring museums and conferring with European naturalists. He accepted the position of curator in charge of the William S. Vaux Collection of mineral specimens and archaeological artifacts at the Philadelphia Academy of Natural Sciences, of which he was elected a member in 1882. He was elected vice director of the academy's Mineralogical and Geological Section in 1899. He retired in 1898 and died in New York City on February 23, 1906, at the age of 86.

His remains were interred at the Oaklands Cemetery in West Goshen Township, just outside West Chester. He was married to Elmira Cherrington (1818–1881) and had four children: Emma Clara, Alonzo Potter, William Alger, and Elsie Louise.

== Mineralogy ==
After picking up his first mineral specimen in 1837, Jefferies joined the Cabinet of Natural Science (West Chester's scientific organization), befriended leading naturalists in the area such as William Darlington and Lewis White Williams, and collected mineral specimens from the quarries and mines of the region. He exchanged specimens with other collectors and scientists in New York, Britain, and continental Europe. Notable U.S. correspondents included Benjamin Silliman, George Brush, and James Dana, to whose System of Mineralogy he contributed specimens for illustration. Over the decades, Jefferis acquired and meticulously cataloged up to 35,000 mineral specimens, including a novel type of vermiculite that Brush named Jefferisite in his honor and a distinctive specimen of brucite from Lancaster County. He frequently loaned his specimens to museums and scholars. Jefferis was "one of the foremost mineral collectors in the United States," and his collection was "considered at the time to be the most spectacular array of minerals assembled by a private collector." Historian Robert Gangewere called it "one of the finest private mineralogical collections available." Curator David Seaman wrote that "the Jefferis Collection was the dominant motive of Mr. Jefferis' life for more than sixty years," being one of the four finest in the country.

In December 1904, Jefferis put his collection up for auction. Several collectors and institutions entered bids, and philanthropist Andrew Carnegie paid $20,000 to acquire the collection, which he donated to the Carnegie Museum of Natural History. When packed, the collection needed two boxcars for its rail transport to Pittsburgh. It remained on exhibit at the Carnegie Museum for almost forty years before space limitations put the collection into storage for thirty years. In September 1980, the Hillman Hall of Minerals and Gems opened to the public, showcasing many of the specimens collected by Jefferis as well as other minerals gathered from around the world. Ninety percent of the specimens in the Hillman Hall's Pennsylvania exhibit room came from his personal collection, and twelve thousand items from Jefferis's collection remain in the Carnegie Museum's holdings.

In addition to his collecting activities, Jefferis taught mineralogy for one year at the West Chester State Normal School while continuing to work at his bank. He was later appointed a professor emeritus at the school. He authored one book, Minerals of Chester County, published in 1864. With Theodore D. Rand and J. T. M. Cardeza, he coauthored an article, "Mineral Localities of Philadelphia and Vicinity," published in the Proceedings of the Academy of Natural Sciences of Philadelphia in 1892.
