= Warner Theater (West Chester, Pennsylvania) =

- U.S. National Register of Historic Places
- U.S. Historic district – Contributing property
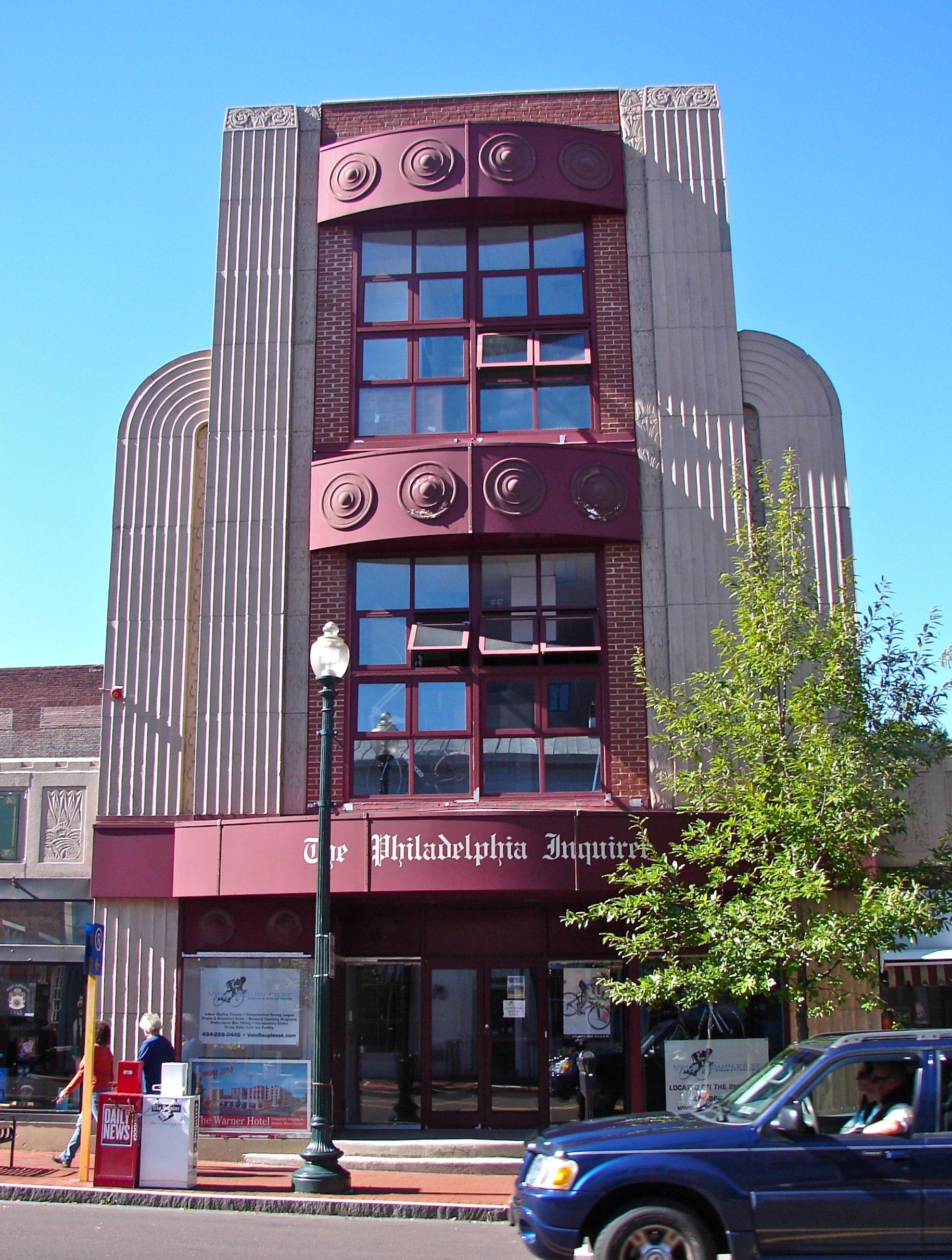
- Warner Theater, October 2010

- Location within Pennsylvania Location within the United States
- Location: 120 N. High St., West Chester, Pennsylvania
- Coordinates: 39°57′37″N 75°36′23″W
- Area: 0 acres (0 ha)
- Built: 1930
- Architect: Rapp & Rapp
- Architectural style: Art Deco
- NRHP reference No.: 79002207
- Added to NRHP: November 20, 1979

The Warner Theater, also known as The High Street Theater, was a historic, American movie theater that was located in West Chester, Chester County, Pennsylvania.

Located in the West Chester Downtown Historic District, it was listed on the National Register of Historic Places in 1979.

The auditorium was demolished in late 1986; the remainder of the building was renovated and converted into the Hotel Warner. Hotel Warner today is a member of Historic Hotels of America, the official program of the National Trust for Historic Preservation.

== History and architectural features ==
Designed by the noted Chicago theater design firm of Rapp and Rapp and built by Warner Brothers, this historic theater opened on November 14, 1930. A composite of one-, two-, and three-story buildings that were created in the Art Deco style, it included a theater, restaurant and a series of seven small stores and had a two-story foyer with a three-story tower that formerly supported the marquee. The auditorium measured 83 by 120 feet (25 m × 37 m), and originally sat 1,650, with 1,300 on the floor and 350 in the balcony.

The auditorium was demolished in late 1986, and the remainder of the building has been renovated as the Hotel Warner. Hotel Warner today is a member of Historic Hotels of America, the official program of the National Trust for Historic Preservation.

== See also ==
- List of Historic Hotels of America
