= West Chester Downtown Historic District =

Historic district in Pennsylvania, United States

- U.S. National Register of Historic Places
- U.S. Historic district
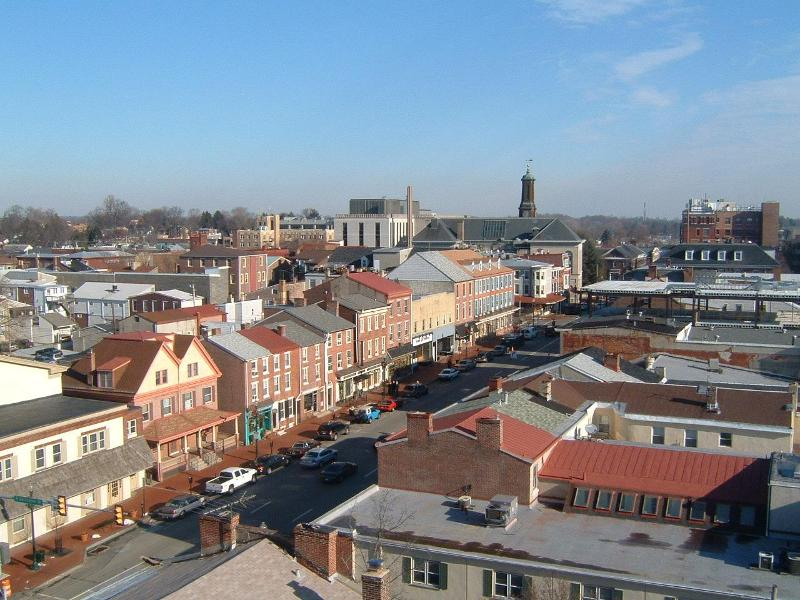
- West Chester Downtown Historic District, January 2006

- Location within Pennsylvania Location within the United States
- Location: Roughly bounded by West Chester's northern boundary, Poplar Street, East Rosedale Avenue, and South Bradford Avenue; West Chester, Pennsylvania
- Coordinates: 39°57′37″N 75°36′20″W
- Area: 521.4 acres (211.0 ha)
- Architect: Walter, Thomas U.; Multiple
- Architectural style: Mid-19th Century Revival, Late 19th and 20th Century Revivals, Late Victorian
- NRHP reference No.: 85001447 (original); 05000096 (increase)

Significant dates
- Added to NRHP: July 2, 1985
- Boundary increase: February 27, 2005

The West Chester Downtown Historic District is a national historic district that is located in West Chester, Chester County, Pennsylvania, United States.

This district was listed on the National Register of Historic Places in 1985. The boundary was increased on February 27, 2005.

== History and architectural features ==
This district encompasses 3,137 contributing buildings in West Chester. It includes residential, commercial, institutional, and industrial buildings that were built between 1789 and the 1930s. Notable buildings include the U.S. Post Office (1907), the Green Tree Building (1933), St. Agnes Church (1851), the Biddle Street School (1917), the Major Groff Memorial Armory, the Horticulture Building (1848) that was designed by Thomas U. Walter, the Denney-Reyburn factory, the Caleb Taylor Store (c. 1818), Federal Ehne's Bakery (c. 1816), Kofke's Store (c. 1816), and the Woolworth building (1928). Also listed and located in the district are the Bank of Chester County, the Buckwalter Building, the Chester County Courthouse, the Farmers and Mechanics Building, and the Warner Theater.
