= Buckwalter Building =

- U.S. National Register of Historic Places
- U.S. Historic district – Contributing property
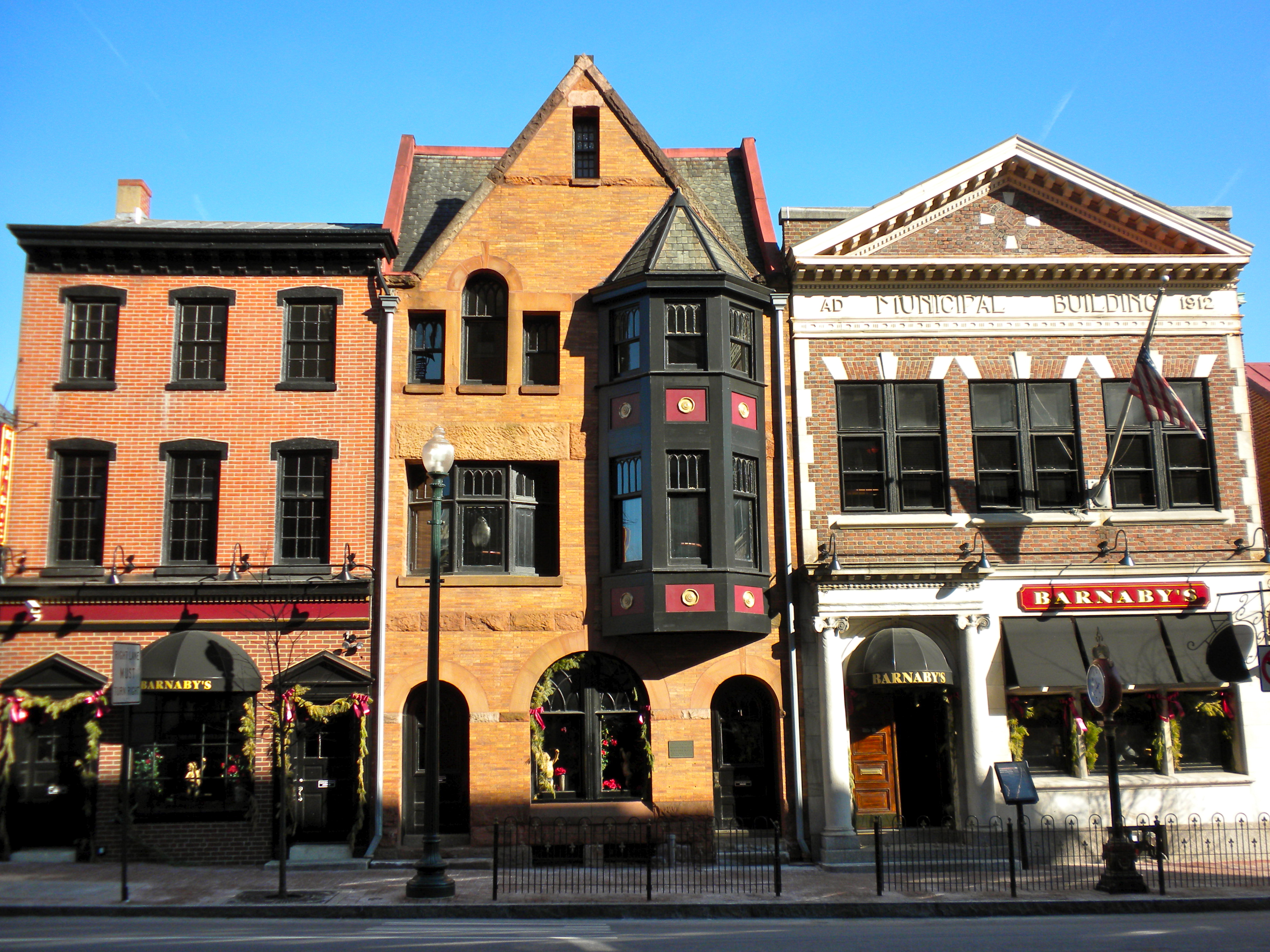
- Buckwalter Building, January 2010

- Location within Pennsylvania Location within the United States
- Location: 11–13 S. High St., West Chester, Pennsylvania
- Coordinates: 39.95950°N 75.60402°W
- Area: 0.1 acres (0.040 ha)
- Built: 1893
- Built by: William Burns
- Architectural style: Romantic Medieval
- NRHP reference No.: 84003180
- Added to NRHP: February 22, 1984

Buckwalter Building is a historic commercial building located in West Chester, Chester County, Pennsylvania. Built for local banker and real estate investor Henry Brinton Buckwalter in 1893, it is a 3 1/2-story, three-bay, brick building in an eclectic Romantic Medieval / Late Gothic Revival style.

It was listed on the National Register of Historic Places in 1984. It is located in the West Chester Downtown Historic District.
