= Joseph McClellan =

American soldier and politician (1746–1834)

Member of the Pennsylvania State Senate
- In office 1797–1800

Personal details
- Born: April 28, 1746 Middletown Township, Delaware County, Pennsylvania, US
- Died: October 13, 1834 (aged 88) Chester County, Pennsylvania
- Occupation: Soldier, farmer, politician

Military service
- Branch/service: Continental Army
- Years of service: 1776–1781
- Rank: Captain
- Unit: York Rifle Company
- Battles/wars: American Revolutionary War; Battle of Long Island; Battle of Brandywine; Battle of Monmouth; Yorktown Campaign (WIA)

Joseph McClellan (April 28, 1746 – October 13, 1834) was an American soldier, farmer, and politician from Pennsylvania who served as a Continental Army captain during the American Revolutionary War. Wounded during the Yorktown campaign and invalidated out of the army, he later served in the Pennsylvania State Senate and became brevet colonel of militia.

== Biography ==
McClellan was born on April 28, 1746, in Middletown Township, Delaware County, Pennsylvania. When he was 13 years old, the family moved to Sadsbury Township in Chester County.

When the American Revolutionary War erupted in 1775, McClellan was commissioned lieutenant of a musket company on July 15, 1776. He commanded a company in Samuel John Atlee's battalion, which fought in the Battle of Long Island and the Battle of Fort Washington. He joined the Continental Army as a captain in Anthony Wayne's brigade, fighting alongside the Marquis de Lafayette at the Battle of Brandywine in 1777. McClellan deployed with the 9th Pennsylvania Regiment through March 22, 1781, before transferring to the 2nd Pennsylvania Regiment under Walter Stewart. Now commanding the York Rifle Company of light infantry, Captain McClellan was wounded in a skirmish with British troops during the Yorktown campaign in the summer of 1781, resigning his commission and returning home to recuperate. Lafayette, now his commanding general, later wrote to McClellan praising the "strict military discipline and wonderful marksmanship" of the company he had commanded.

Becoming a local dignitary after the war ended, McClellan was elected Chester County commissioner in 1784 and lieutenant of the county militia with the brevet rank of colonel in 1790. He served as county sheriff from 1792 from 1795. He was captain of dragoons and major of a regiment mustered to suppress the Whiskey Rebellion in 1794. From 1797 to 1800, he served in the Pennsylvania State Senate, representing Bucks, Chester, and Montgomery counties as a Federalist. He was elected burgess of West Chester in 1814 and served as the first president of the Bank of Chester County (1814–1816 and again 1817–1819). He emerged from retirement to chair a committee to welcome Lafayette on a tour of Chester County in 1824–1825.

== Death and legacy ==
McClellan died at his Chester County farm in 1834 at the age of 88. A five-foot-tall monument, comprising two blocks of Brandywine granite surmounted with a polished granite ball featuring an inscription, was dedicated to honor his service during the Revolutionary War on September 11, 1895. The memorial is located at the Birmingham Friends Meetinghouse.

McClellan married Keziah Parke in 1786. His granddaughter, Keziah Ann Hemphill, married Thomas S. Bell, and their children included Thomas S. Bell Jr.
