= Mushroom spawn =

Mushroom spawn is a substrate that already has mycelium growing on it.

Mycelium, or actively growing mushroom culture, is placed on growth substrate to seed or introduce mushrooms to grow on a substrate. This is also known as inoculation, spawning or adding spawn. This can take the form of a solid such as an agar wedge, existing mushroom mycelium spawn, or liquid form of mycelium, called a liquid culture. Its main advantages are to reduce chances of contamination while giving mushrooms a firm beginning.

Definition of Spawn: Spawn is a type of medium present in mushroom tissue that propagates the fungus such as Trichoderma which is the root system of mushrooms.

Mycelium, or actively growing mushroom culture, is placed on a substrate—usually sterilized grains such as rye or millet—and induced to grow into those grains. This is called inoculation. Inoculated grains (or plugs) are referred to as spawn. Spores are another inoculation option, but are less developed than established mycelium. Since they are also contaminated easily, they are only manipulated in laboratory conditions with a laminar flow cabinet.

== See also ==
- Fungiculture
- Spawn (biology)#Fungi
