= Bank of Chester County =

U.S. historic place in Pennsylvania

- U.S. National Register of Historic Places
- U.S. Historic district – Contributing property
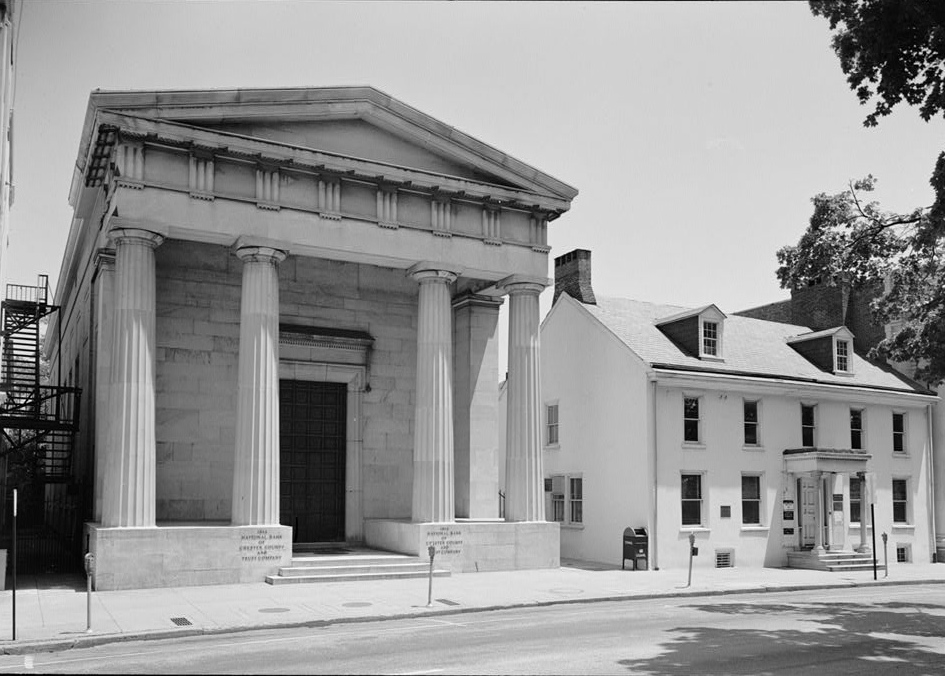
- Bank of Chester County, HABS Photo, June 1958

- Location within Pennsylvania
- Location: 17 N. High St., West Chester, Pennsylvania
- Coordinates: 39.960277°N 75.604739°W
- Area: 0.093 acres (0.038 ha)
- Architect: Thomas U. Walter
- Architectural style: Greek Revival
- NRHP reference No.: 02001458
- Added to NRHP: June 5, 1972

Bank of Chester County (also known as the National Bank of Chester County, National Bank of Chester County and Trust Company, and Fidelity Bank) is a historic two-story bank building located in West Chester, Chester County, Pennsylvania, the first bank to be chartered in the county. Following the failure to renew the charter of the Bank of the United States in 1811, states received responsibility over the banking systems within their jurisdiction. Although an initial proposal was rejected by the state legislature in 1813, a 41-bank proposal was passed the following year. An early bank building was utilized in West Chester beginning in 1814 at the Record Office, though the bank was relocated in 1818 to a building across the street, present-day 13 High Street. Following a proposal for a new site in 1835, a bank, to be built at 17 High Street, designed by architect Thomas Ustick Walter (1804–1887). It was built in 1836 in the Greek Revival style at the cost of $33,000, and features a portico with four Doric order columns; the bank was subsequently altered in 1874, 1905, and 1928. The previous building has since been rented to numerous individuals, although it still houses outdated equipment no longer used by the bank. The current building is occupied by Wells Fargo.

It was listed on the National Register of Historic Places in 1972, located in the West Chester Downtown Historic District.

== Background ==
After Congress had been unwilling to renew the charter of the First Bank of the United States in 1811, control over banking procedures which would otherwise have been performed by the Bank of the United States was granted to the states instead. In 1813, legislation was proposed by the Pennsylvania state legislature to allow the construction of 25 banks in the state; however, then-governor Simon Snyder rejected the proposal. In 1814, such a proposal was made once more for the establishment of 41 banks, but was vetoed yet again; however, the legislature overturned the veto with overwhelming support. The stock for a bank in Chester County was granted, numbering 9,000 shares at a cost of $50 each. Initially, the bank assigned subscriptions to thirteen commissioners, although it decreased the number of individuals to be given stock to eleven in 1897. Regular subscriptions to the shares were eventually established to the general population as well following the confirmation of the commissioners. The bank's early directors and cashiers included local dignitaries such as Joseph McClellan, Richard Thomas, William Darlington, David Townsend, Washington Townsend, William W. Jefferis, J. Smith Futhey, and Robert Cornwell.

The Bank of Chester County, the first to be built in the county, was then conceived in 1814, located in the Record Office at the intersection of High and Gay Streets in West Chester, Pennsylvania. In 1818, a building on the other side of High Street was bought for the bank – located at present-day 13 High Street, having been built in 1792. Over time, modifications were made to the building in order to suit its purpose. The bank was the main building occupying the lot until a proposal in 1835 resulted in the construction of the Thomas U. Walter building, named for its architect, the new site of the bank after it was built in 1836 and opened in 1837 at a cost of $33,000 at 17 High Street. The stone used to build the bank originated at the Jacobs and Cornog marble quarry in West Whiteland Township. Although the old building's ownership is retained by the bank and is used to store old equipment, it is no longer used, and has been rented to numerous individuals over time, including William Darlington, David Townsend, and William W. Jefferis. Until 1857, the Bank of Chester County was the only one in the county.

On October 25, 1864, the bank was reorganized as the National Bank of Chester County to comply with federal laws, and was named as such until 1930, when the bank was re-designated as the National Bank of Chester County and Trust Company. On June 5, 1972, the Bank of Chester County was listed on the National Register of Historic Places. As of 1987, the bank was named Fidelity Bank; the building is now owned and operated by Wells Fargo.

== Design ==
The building was designed in the Greek Revival style, conceived with dimensions of 45 feet (14 m) by 90 feet (27 m). The foundation is covered with high-quality stone, with marble of lesser quality laid on the water table. The walls, which were built with marble, were overlaid with bricks; the western portico, which was lowered in 1928, includes four Doric columns. Although chimneys are still in place on the bank, none of the original ones remain. The building only has a single door, by the front-west side. The north and south walls were rebuilt as a result of a renovation in 1928; two of the original windows on those walls, however, were maintained, although the original cornices were not preserved and replicas are currently in place. The roof is covered with copper.

The initial floor plan of the two-story bank indicated a smaller banking room than what was constructed. Two vaults, originally placed on either side of the entrance hall, were converted into offices, and two rooms by the back of the bank were dismantled entirely as well as the stairways leading to them. Although the interior was designed with a Greek style in mind with marble layered on the walls, renovations since then resulted in changes in the interior. In 1854, Carl Stromberg recolored the ceiling with shades of blue, with "leaves, fruit, and flowers" painted on the walls' edges. The opposite walls featured murals with additional landscapes. Later, in 1863, a statue of William Darlington was erected for the bank by William Marshal Swayne. A renovation in 1928 was modified to an unknown extent with a "Greek influence and design". Six marble mantels and coal grates were requested for the heating systems of the building for the fireplaces in the building, located in the north and south areas of the banking room, in addition to one each in the president's, cashier's, and two others in the removed rear rooms, though the building is currently powered by electricity. None of the original flooring, doors, nor hardware remains. In 1874, the interior experienced a complete redesign, with the addition of upgraded safes and additional vaults for $10,000. The building was renovated a total of three times – in 1874, 1905, and 1928.
