= Sharples Separator Works =

- U.S. National Register of Historic Places
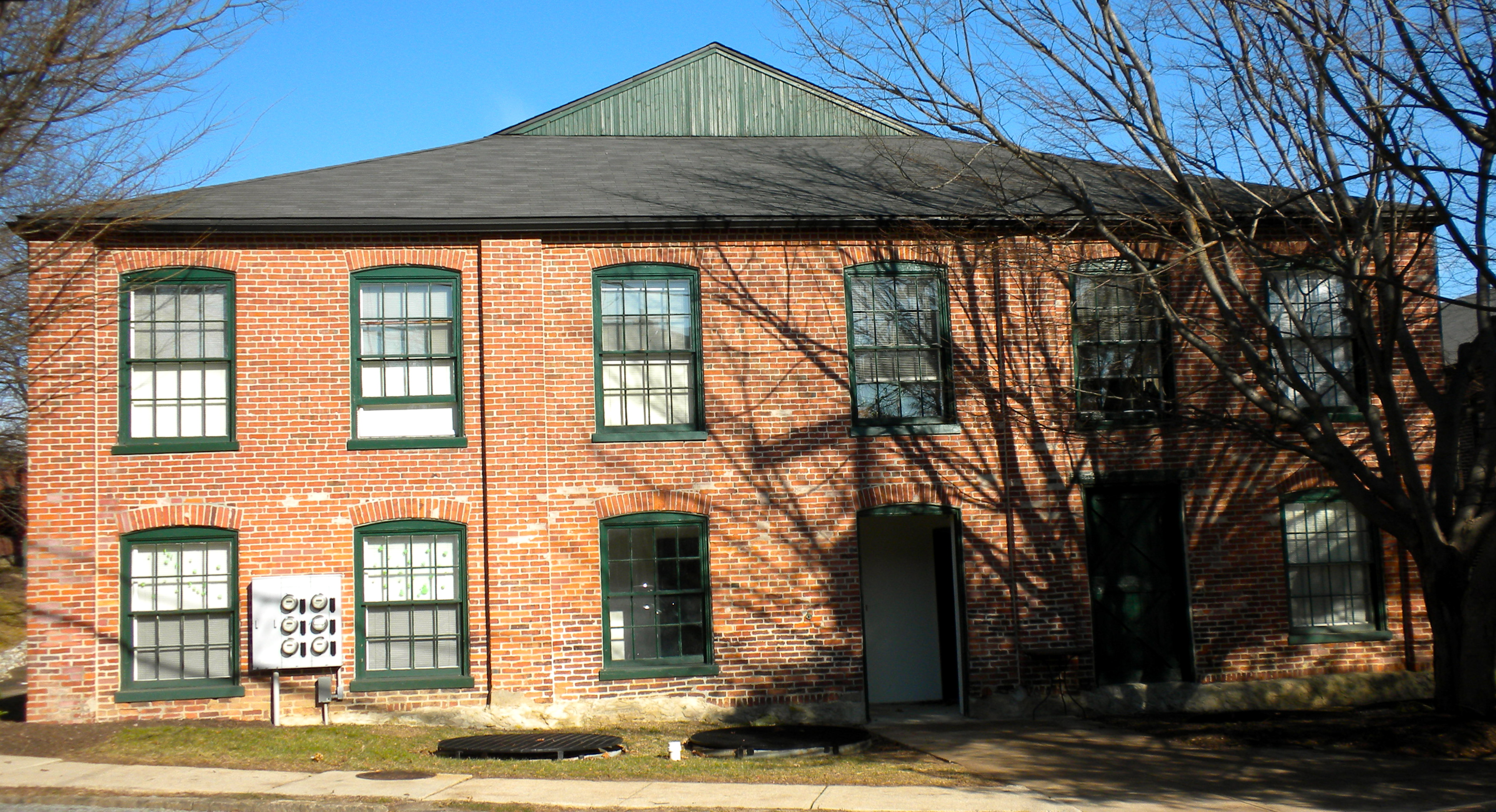
- Sharples Separator Works, January 2010

- Location within Pennsylvania Location within the United States
- Location: N. Franklin and Evans Sts., West Chester, Pennsylvania
- Coordinates: 39°57′54″N 75°36′09″W
- Area: 5 acres (2.0 ha)
- Built: 1893
- Architect: Multiple
- NRHP reference No.: 84003214
- Added to NRHP: June 28, 1984

The Sharples Separator Works, also known as the Gumas Warehouse and Kauffman Warehouse, is an historic factory complex in West Chester, Chester County, Pennsylvania, United States.

It was listed on the National Register of Historic Places in 1984.

== History and architectural features ==
Built between 1890 and 1909 by Philip M. Sharples, this site includes fourteen contributing buildings, which range between one and three stories each, are of brick construction, and have low-pitched gable roofs or hipped roofs. It was home to the manufacturing works for the Sharples Tubular Centrifugal Separator, the first cream separator that was invented in the United States.

== Gallery ==
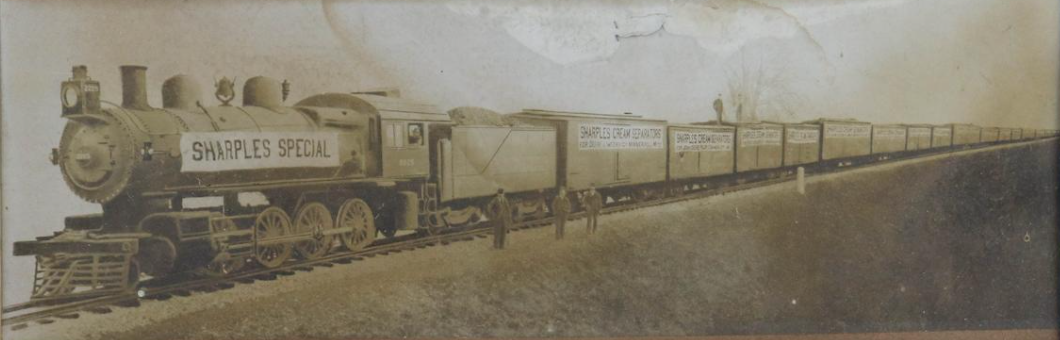
Train shipment of Sharples cream separators
