= Farmers and Mechanics Building =

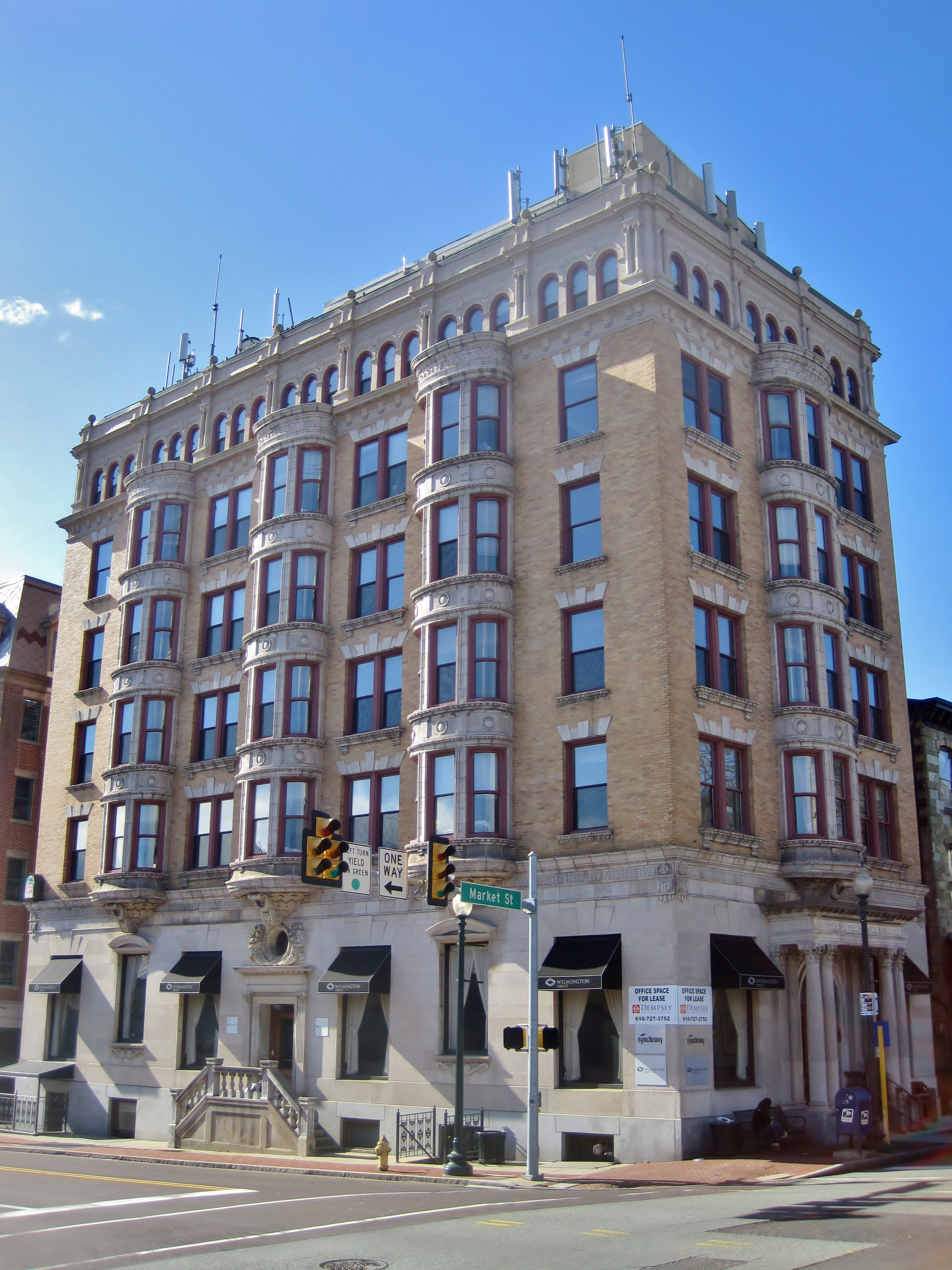
- Corner of Market & High St., West Chester, PA
- Interactive map of the Farmers and Mechanics Building area

General information
- Type: Skyscraper
- Architectural style: Beaux-Arts architecture
- Completed: 1907
- Opening: 1908

Technical details
- Floor count: 7
- Farmers and Mechanics Trust Company Building
- U.S. National Register of Historic Places
- U.S. Historic district – Contributing property
- Location within Pennsylvania Location within the United States
- Location: Market and High Sts., West Chester, Pennsylvania
- Coordinates: 39.9595°N 75.6044°W
- Area: 0.1 acres (0.04 ha)
- Built: 1907-1908
- Architect: William C. Prichett, F.A.I.A.
- Architectural style: Classical Revival
- NRHP reference No.: 83002223
- Added to NRHP: January 6, 1983

The Farmers and Mechanics Building is a historic "skyscraper" located in West Chester, Chester County, Pennsylvania. It was completed in 1908 and is a six-story skyscraper building, with a basement and penthouse in the Classical Revival style. The top floor once featured a Roof Garden. The exterior is faced in Indiana limestone and yellow hard face brick, with terra cotta decorative details. In 1918 when the Boy Scouts were founded in Chester County the Farmers and Mechanics Building became their headquarters.

It was added to the National Register of Historic Places in 1983. It is located in the West Chester Downtown Historic District.
