= West Chester, Pennsylvania =

Borough in Pennsylvania, US

- Borough
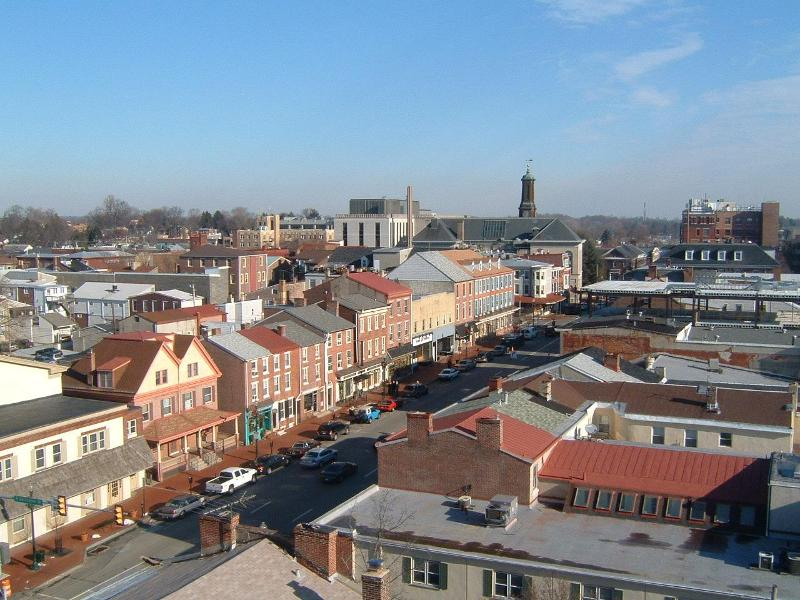
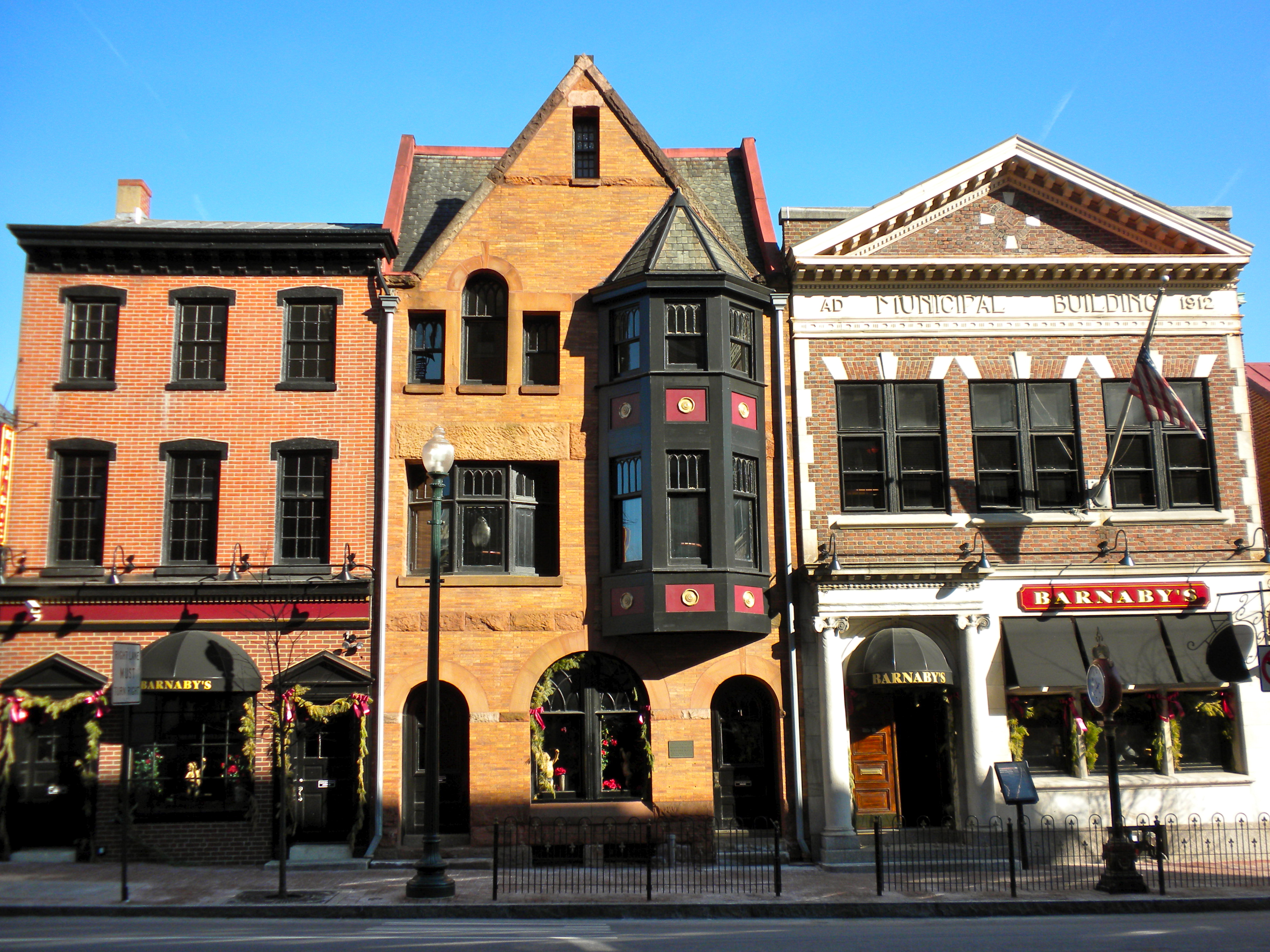
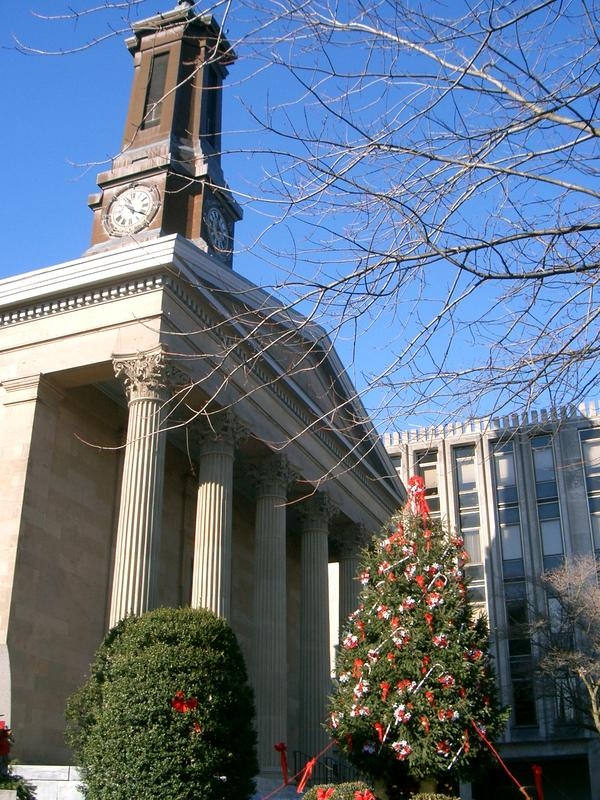
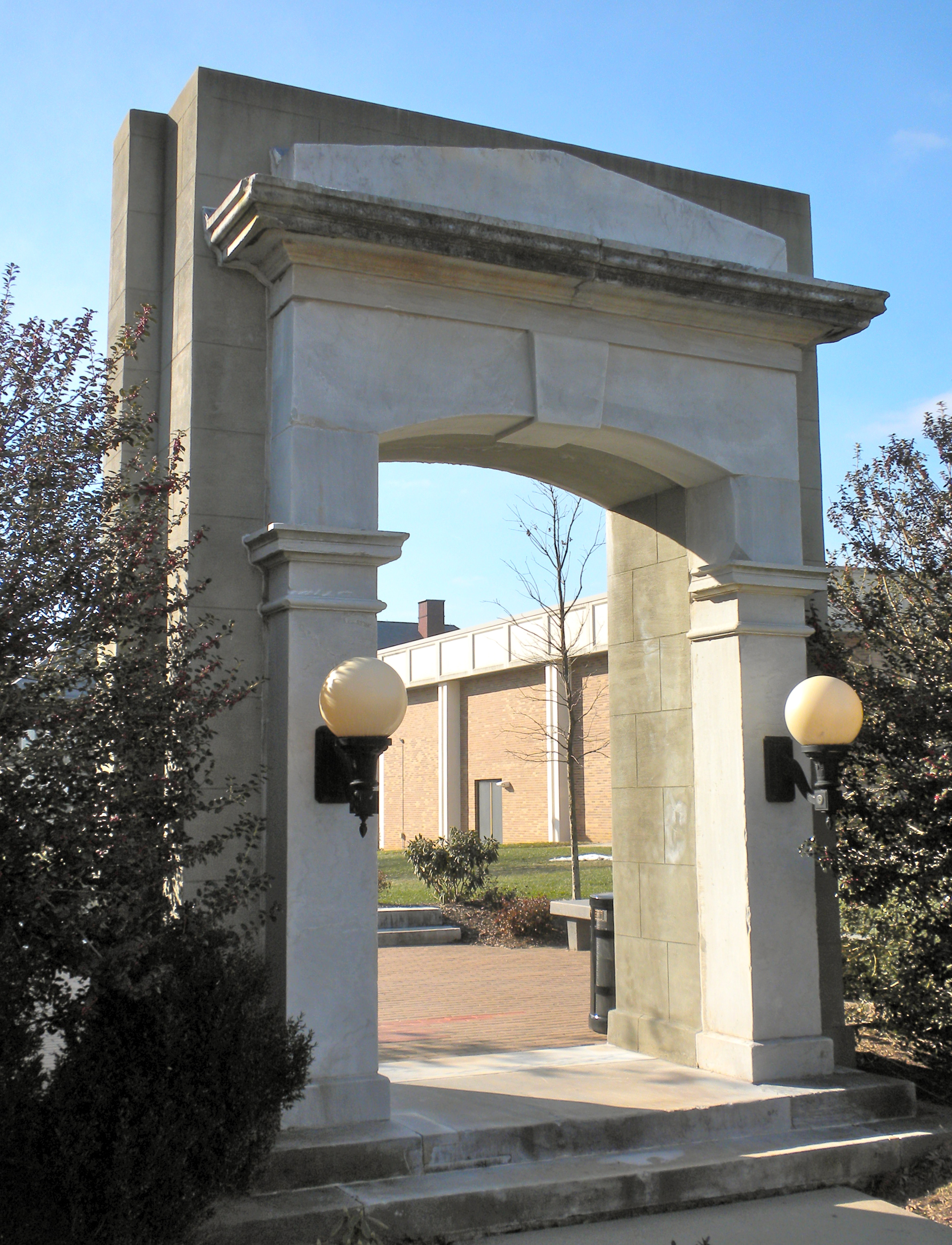
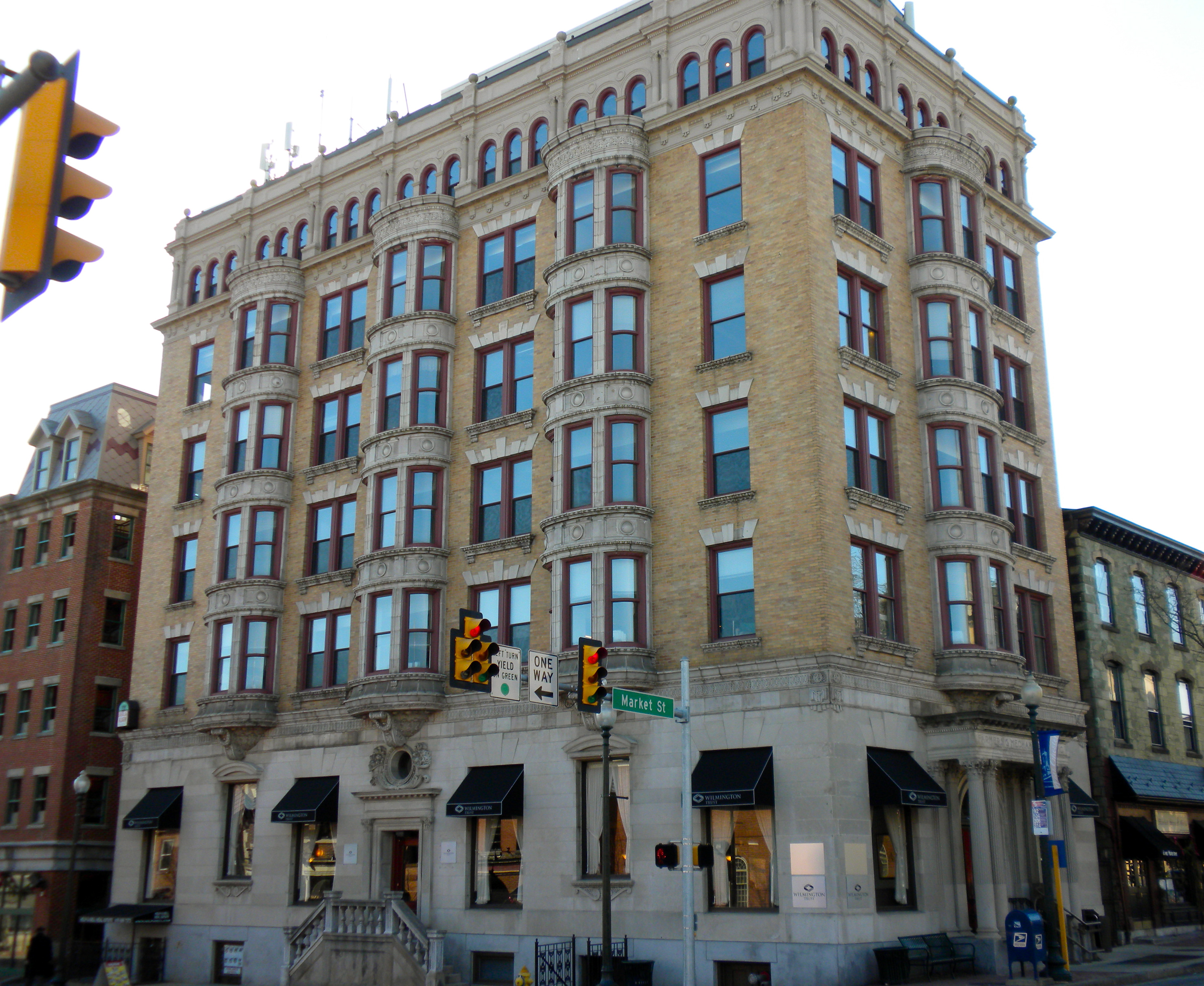
- West Chester Downtown Historic District Buckwalter Building Chester County Courthouse West Chester University Farmers and Mechanics Building

- Flag Seal
- Etymology: West of Chester, Pennsylvania
- Interactive map of West Chester, Pennsylvania
- Location within Pennsylvania Location within the United States
- Coordinates: 39°57′31″N 75°36′18″W
- Country: United States
- State: Pennsylvania
- County: Chester
- Incorporated: 1799; 227 years ago

Government
  - Mayor: Lillian DeBaptiste (D)

Area
  - Total: 1.85 sq mi (4.78 km^{2})
  - Land: 1.85 sq mi (4.78 km^{2})
  - Water: 0 sq mi (0.00 km^{2})
- Elevation: 446 ft (136 m)

Population (2023)
  - Total: 18,750
  - Density: 10,113.1/sq mi (3,904.69/km^{2})
- Time zone: UTC-5 (EST)
  - Summer (DST): UTC-4 (EDT)
- ZIP Codes: 19380–19383, 19388
- Area codes: 484 and 610
- FIPS code: 42-82704
- Website: west-chester.com

West Chester is a borough and the county seat of Chester County, Pennsylvania, United States. Located in the Philadelphia metropolitan area, the borough had a population of 18,671 at the 2020 census. West Chester is the mailing address for most of its neighboring townships.

Much of the West Chester University North Campus and the Chester County government are located within the borough. The center of town is located at the intersection of Gay and High Streets.

== History ==
The area was originally known as Turk's Head, named after the inn of the same name located in what is now the center of the borough. (Note: The former inn is located at 1 North High Street. A historical marker stands there today.) West Chester has been the seat of government in Chester County since 1786 when the seat was moved from nearby Chester in what is now Delaware County. The borough was incorporated in 1799.

In the center of town is its courthouse, a classical revival building designed in the 1840s by Thomas U. Walter, one of the architects for the Capitol in Washington, D.C. In the 18th century West Chester was a center of clockmaking. Irish revolutionary Theobald Wolfe Tone briefly lived in West Chester during his exile. In the late 19th century the Hoopes, Bro. and Darlington company became a major wheelworks, first for wagons and later automobiles. In the early 20th century, an important industry was the Sharples cream separator company. In the late 20th century, Commodore International, one of the pioneers of home computers, giving its headquarters as West Chester, was located approximately a mile northeast of the borough.

The West Chester Downtown Historic District was listed on the National Register of Historic Places in 1985. Other listed buildings are the Bank of Chester County, Buckwalter Building, Butler House, Chester County Courthouse, William Everhart Buildings, Farmers and Mechanics Building, First Presbyterian Church of West Chester, New Century Clubhouse, Joseph Rothrock House, Sharples Homestead, Sharples Separator Works, Warner Theater, West Chester Boarding School for Boys, and components of West Chester State College Quadrangle Historic District.

== Geography ==
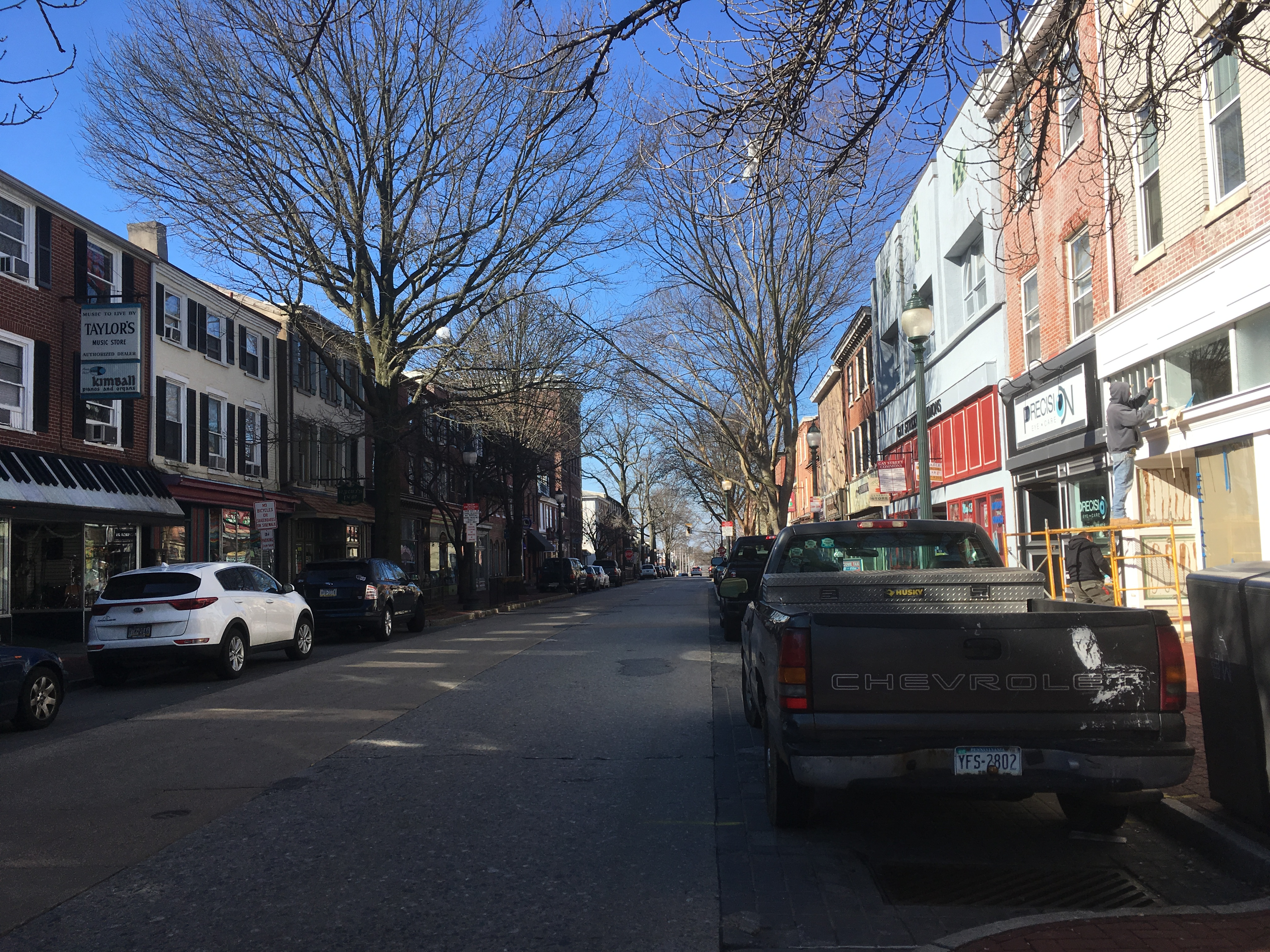
Gay Street in downtown West Chester

West Goshen Township borders West Chester to the north, south, and east, while East Bradford Township borders West Chester to the west. The borough straddles the Brandywine Creek and Chester Creek watersheds. It is located 25 miles (40 km) west of Philadelphia and 17 miles (27 km) north of Wilmington, Delaware.

According to the United States Census Bureau, the borough has a total area of 1.8 square miles (5 km^{2}), all land.

=== Climate ===
As with much of southeastern Pennsylvania east of the Appalachian Mountains, West Chester lies in the transition zone between the humid continental (Köppen: Dfa) and humid subtropical (Köppen: Cfa) climate zones, with generally more characteristics of the former than the latter. Summers are hot and humid and winters are cold but variable. Annual high temperatures average between 39.0 °F (3.9 °C) and 85.4 °F (29.7 °C), annual low temperatures average between 22.2 °F (−5.4 °C) and 64.4 °F (18.0 °C), with the record high being 105 °F (41 °C), and record low being −16 °F (−27 °C).

Annual precipitation averages 46.7 inches (119 cm), and annual snowfall averages 27.7 inches (70 cm).

Climate data for West Chester, Pennsylvania
Month	Jan	Feb	Mar	Apr	May	Jun	Jul	Aug	Sep	Oct	Nov	Dec	Year
Mean daily maximum °F (°C)	39.0 (3.9)	40.5 (4.7)	50.8 (10.4)	62.1 (16.7)	72.7 (22.6)	80.9 (27.2)	85.4 (29.7)	83.5 (28.6)	77.1 (25.1)	65.9 (18.8)	54.1 (12.3)	42.2 (5.7)	62.9 (17.1)
Daily mean °F (°C)	30.7 (−0.7)	31.6 (−0.2)	40.9 (4.9)	51.2 (10.7)	61.5 (16.4)	70.2 (21.2)	74.9 (23.8)	73.2 (22.9)	66.4 (19.1)	55.1 (12.8)	44.6 (7.0)	33.8 (1.0)	52.8 (11.6)
Mean daily minimum °F (°C)	22.2 (−5.4)	22.6 (−5.2)	30.8 (−0.7)	40.2 (4.6)	50.3 (10.2)	59.5 (15.3)	64.4 (18.0)	62.9 (17.2)	55.7 (13.2)	44.3 (6.8)	35.0 (1.7)	25.5 (−3.6)	42.8 (6.0)
Average precipitation inches (mm)	3.5 (89)	3.3 (84)	3.8 (97)	3.7 (94)	4 (100)	4.3 (110)	4.5 (110)	4.6 (120)	4.1 (100)	3.6 (91)	3.6 (91)	3.7 (94)	46.7 (1,180)
Average snowfall inches (cm)	7 (18)	8.6 (22)	4.6 (12)	0.9 (2.3)	0.0 (0.0)	0.0 (0.0)	0.0 (0.0)	0.0 (0.0)	0.0 (0.0)	0.1 (0.25)	1.2 (3.0)	5.3 (13)	27.7 (70)
Source: Weatherbase

== Demographics ==
Historical population
Census	Pop.	Note	%±
1800	374		—
1810	471		25.9%
1820	552		17.2%
1830	1,258		127.9%
1840	2,152		71.1%
1850	3,172		47.4%
1860	4,757		50.0%
1870	5,630		18.4%
1880	7,046		25.2%
1890	8,028		13.9%
1900	9,524		18.6%
1910	11,767		23.6%
1920	11,717		−0.4%
1930	12,325		5.2%
1940	13,289		7.8%
1950	15,168		14.1%
1960	15,705		3.5%
1970	19,301		22.9%
1980	17,435		−9.7%
1990	18,041		3.5%
2000	17,861		−1.0%
2010	18,461		3.4%
2020	18,671		1.1%
U.S. Decennial Census

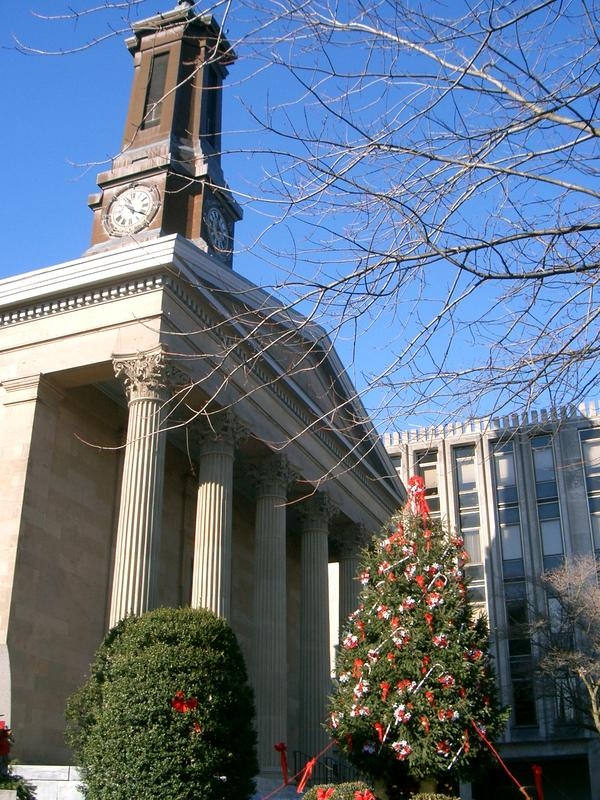
Old Chester County Courthouse. The new Chester County Justice Center is located at West Market St. and North Darlington St.

=== 2020 census ===
As of the 2020 census, West Chester had a population of 18,671. The median age was 26.1 years. 12.5% of residents were under the age of 18 and 9.8% of residents were 65 years of age or older. For every 100 females there were 88.7 males, and for every 100 females age 18 and over there were 87.2 males age 18 and over.

100.0% of residents lived in urban areas, while 0.0% lived in rural areas.

There were 6,733 households in West Chester, of which 18.2% had children under the age of 18 living in them. Of all households, 27.9% were married-couple households, 28.5% were households with a male householder and no spouse or partner present, and 34.9% were households with a female householder and no spouse or partner present. About 37.8% of all households were made up of individuals and 9.2% had someone living alone who was 65 years of age or older.

There were 7,513 housing units, of which 10.4% were vacant. The homeowner vacancy rate was 1.5% and the rental vacancy rate was 6.7%.

Racial composition as of the 2020 census
Race	Number	Percent
White	13,942	74.7%
Black or African American	1,954	10.5%
American Indian and Alaska Native	59	0.3%
Asian	336	1.8%
Native Hawaiian and Other Pacific Islander	5	0.0%
Some other race	1,082	5.8%
Two or more races	1,293	6.9%
Hispanic or Latino (of any race)	2,309	12.4%

=== 2010 census ===
At the 2010 census, the borough was 72.1% non-Hispanic White, 12.1% Black or African American, 0.2% Native American, 1.4% Asian, and 2.4% was of two or more races. About 13.4% of the population was of Hispanic or Latino ancestry.

=== 2000 census ===
As of the census of 2000, 17,861 people, 6,265 households, and 2,662 families resided in the borough. The population density was 9,703.3 inhabitants per square mile (3,746.5/km^{2}). The 6,541 housing units averaged 3,553.5 per square mile (1,372.6/km^{2}). The racial makeup of the borough was 75.44% White, 17.08% Black, 3.64% from other races, 1.46% Asian, 0.31% Native American, 0.07% Pacific Islander, and 2.00% from two or more races. Hispanics or Latinos of any race were 8.94%.

Of the 6,265 households, 19.1% had children under the age of 18 living in them, 26.8% were married couples living together, 12.1% had a female householder with no husband present, and 57.5% were not families. About 35.3% of all households were made up of individuals, and 7.8% had someone living alone who was 65 years of age or older. The average household size was 2.31 and the average family size was 2.95.

In the borough the population was spread out, with 13.4% under the age of 18, 37.7% from 18 to 24, 26.6% from 25 to 44, 13.3% from 45 to 64, and 9.0% who were 65 years of age or older. The median age was 25 years. For every 100 females, there were 88.4 males. For every 100 females age 18 and over, there were 85.7 males.

=== Income and poverty ===
The median income for a household in the borough from 2018 to 2022 was $71,875. The per capita income for the borough was $41,443. 21% of the population lives below the poverty line.

== Economy ==
Corporate headquarters include:

- Commodore Business Machines, the operational headquarters of Commodore International (now defunct)
- Communications Test Design, Inc. (CTDI), engineering, repair, and logistics for telecommunications equipment
- Mars Drinks, maker of Flavia Beverage Systems
- VWR International (lab and scientific supplies distributor)
- The operational headquarters of medical company Synthes
- Economy.com, part of Moody's Analytics

QVC has its headquarters and television studios in West Goshen Township, near West Chester. It is located in the same buildings that were once the corporate headquarters of Commodore International. Electronics Boutique, when it existed as an independent company, had its headquarters in West Goshen Township, in proximity to West Chester.

Among the major shopping centers in the area is Bradford Plaza, a 22-acre (8.9 ha) property with a 161,000-square-foot (15,000 m^{2}) center which sold in 2014 to New York Life for $35.7 million.

== Culture and media ==
The West Chester Public Library has provided library services to area residents since 1872. It currently has a collection of 50,000 items and receives 110,000 visits every year. The Francis Harvey Green Library on the university campus has additional collections.

The Daily Local News, headquartered in West Chester, covers Chester County events. WCHE (1520 AM) broadcasts from downtown West Chester and is a local commercial radio station that provides news and entertainment to Chester County. The Quad is the student-run newspaper of West Chester University. Published since 1932, it covers not only campus events, but also regional and national news. Radio station WCUR (91.7 FM) broadcasts from the borough and is managed by university students.

The flag of West Chester was officially adopted by Borough Council and debuted in early 2019, after a contest sponsored by local business The Fence Authority and its founder John DiGiuseppe. The winning design was created by Julie Allen. The six gold ribbons on the flag represent the six original streets of West Chester: Market, Gay, High, Chestnut, Walnut, and Church. The flag is in the official colors of the borough, Pantone Blue 7455C and Pantone Gold 123C.

== Transportation ==
=== Roads and highways ===
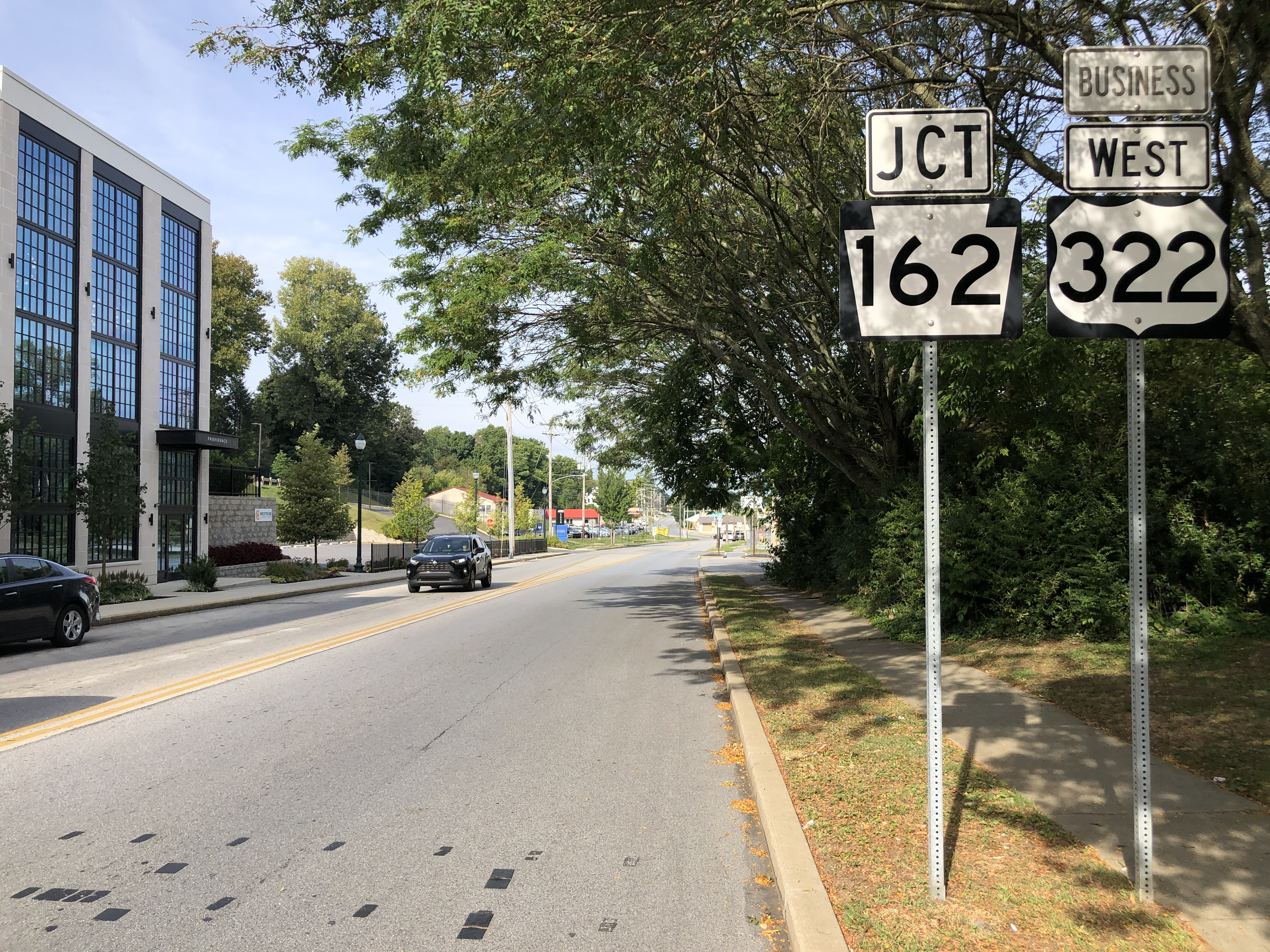
US 322 Business in West Chester

As of 2011, there were 33.82 miles (54.43 km) of public roads in West Chester, of which 5.36 miles (8.63 km) were maintained by Pennsylvania Department of Transportation (PennDOT) and 28.46 miles (45.80 km) were maintained by the borough.

US 202 and US 322 are the major highways serving the area, though both bypass West Chester Borough on the limited-access West Chester Bypass. US 202 heads northeast to King of Prussia and south to Wilmington, Delaware while US 322 heads northwest to Downingtown and southeast to Chester. US 322 Business still follows the original alignment of US 322 and part of the original alignment of US 202 through West Chester along Hannum Avenue, Chestnut and Market streets, and South High Street.

The main east–west road to West Chester is West Chester Pike, which begins in Upper Darby Township, Delaware County, just outside Philadelphia, and is part of Pennsylvania Route 3 (PA 3). The West Chester Pike originally existed as a private turnpike connecting Philadelphia and West Chester between 1850 and 1918, when it became a public road. In West Chester, PA 3 follows Market Street eastbound and Gay Street westbound. The main north–south road in West Chester is High Street. To the north of town, the road is known as Pottstown Pike, which connects to PA 100 near Exton (PA 100 formerly ran through town). To the south of town, the road is known as Wilmington-West Chester Pike. Other state routes serving West Chester include PA 162 and PA 842, which head west towards Unionville, and PA 52, which heads southwest towards Kennett Square.

=== Public transportation ===
West Chester Transportation Center

West Chester is home to the West Chester Transportation Center, which serves as a parking garage for the Chester County Justice Center and a bus terminal, which is located on the lower level of the facility. Three of SEPTA's Suburban Division bus routes serve West Chester. The Route 92 bus connects West Chester to the King of Prussia Transit Center, the Route 104 bus runs between West Chester University and the 69th Street Transportation Center, mostly following West Chester Pike, and the Route 135 bus connects West Chester to Exton, Downingtown, and Coatesville. The Route 104 bus replaced a trolley service that connected West Chester to Philadelphia along the West Chester Pike between 1898 and the 1950s. West Chester is also served by the Transportation Management Association of Chester County's SCCOOT, which provides service to Kennett Square and Oxford.

Until September 1986, West Chester was served by SEPTA's Media/Wawa Line commuter rail line, then known as the Media/West Chester Line. Service on the line was discontinued because of poor track conditions west of Elwyn station. At the time, SEPTA had limited funds for the necessary repairs and offered Chester County the option of either improving the rail line or expanding parking availability at the nearby Exton station on SEPTA's Paoli/Thorndale Line. The county opted for the latter, and service on the line was cut back to Elwyn (service was re-extended to Wawa Station in August 2022). The rail line into West Chester is used by the West Chester Railroad, a heritage railroad.

== Government ==
The borough is governed by the town council form of government. Led by the Borough Manager, there are seven council members, each representing one of the seven voting wards. The council controls all departments except the Police Department (the Mayor directs Police Department activities through the Chief of Police). The mayor and council members are directly elected by borough voters.

On January 3, 2022, Lillian DeBaptiste (D), daughter of former mayor Clifford DeBaptiste (R), was sworn in as mayor.

=== Council members ===
as of November 5, 2021:

Ward	Council member	Party	Term ends
1	Patrick McCoy	Democratic	2025
2	Nick Allen	Democratic	2023
3	Brian McGinnis	Democratic	2025
4	Michael Stefano	Democratic	2023
5	Sheila Vaccaro	Democratic	2025
6	Bernie Flynn	Democratic	2023
7	Lisa Dorsey	Democratic	2025

== Education ==
=== Public schools ===
The West Chester Area School District, an independent entity, manages the area's public school system. All of the secondary schools operated by the district serve sections of West Chester borough: they are three high schools (Henderson High School, West Chester East High School, Rustin High School) and three middle schools (E.N. Peirce Middle School, J.R. Fugett Middle School, G.A. Stetson Middle School).

Elementary schools serving sections of West Chester borough include: East Bradford, East Goshen, Hillsdale, Greystone, Sarah Starkweather, and Westtown-Thornbury. Previously the following also included sections in West Chester borough: Exton, Fern Hill, Glen Acres, Mary C. Howse, and Penn Wood. Under some zoning proposals c. 2018, Exton, Glen Acres, Howse, and Penn Wood would no longer serve portions of West Chester borough.

=== Private schools ===
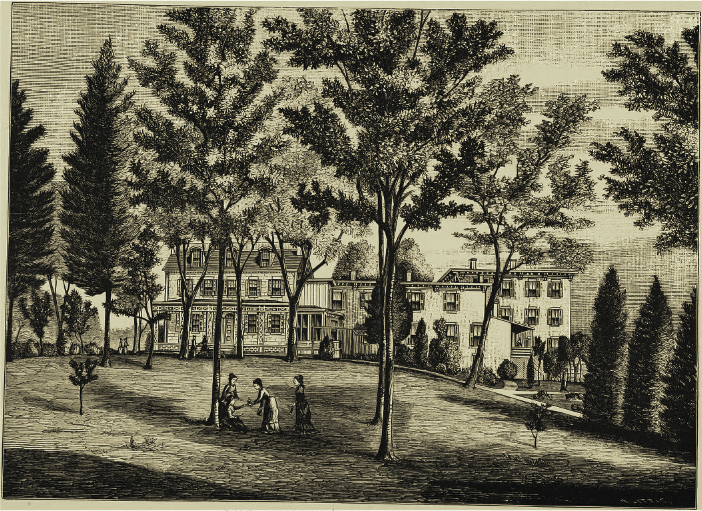
Darlington Seminary was a nonsectarian girls' school

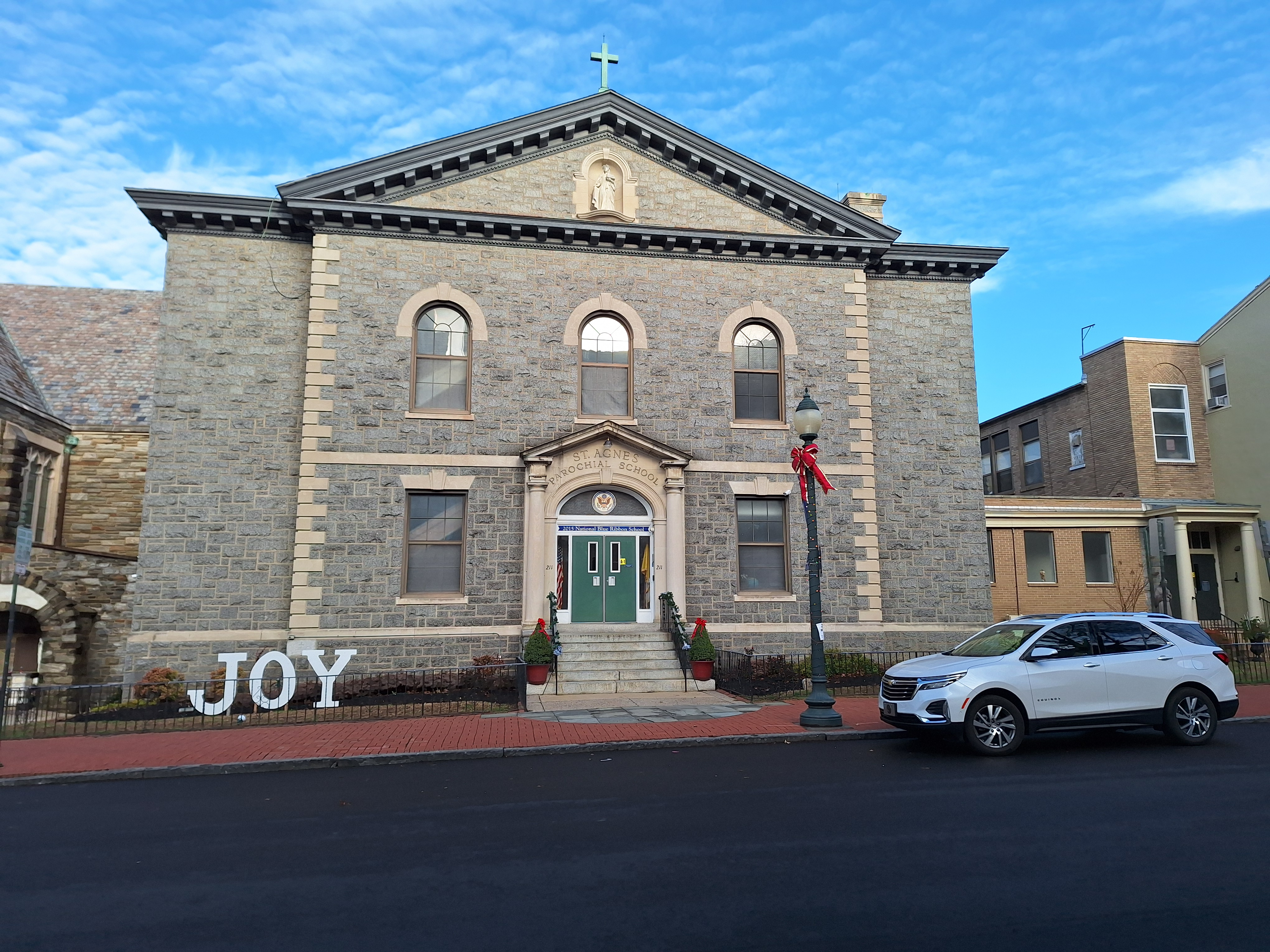
St. Agnes School

St. Agnes School, a K-8 school of the Roman Catholic Archdiocese of Philadelphia, is in the borough limits. It opened in 1871. As of 2020 its enrollment is over 300.

There are other Catholic K–8 schools with West Chester postal addresses:

- SS. Peter and Paul School (East Goshen Township) was established in September 2001, with planning for the school beginning in 1997.
- SS. Simon and Jude School (Westtown Township)
- St. Maximilian Kolbe School (Westtown Township)

=== Colleges and universities ===
Much of West Chester University's North Campus is located in the borough, south of the commercial and retail center.

Delaware County Community College is the community college system for Chester County.

=== Public libraries ===
West Chester Public Library is the community library. The library had its roots in a subscription library founded in 1815 by William Darlington and David Townsend and dissolved in 1831. Incorporated in 1872, the library rented rooms to house its collections until March 1888, when the library opened at its current location at 415 North Church Street, on land donated by Hannah M. Darlington, who also donated the Tiffany-style stained-glass windows. The architect was T. Roney Williamson. The library became permanently free and open to the public in 1905, coming under the authority of the borough council and school board. The library built an extension for a children's library in 1916. The West Chester Garden Club landscaped the grounds and erected a wall around the courtyard in 1934.

== Tourism ==
West Chester has a variety of places to visit, including restaurants, shops, parks, and historical sites. Some popular tourist attractions include the Uptown! Knauer Performing Arts Center, the Chester County History Center, the American Helicopter Museum, the West Chester Railroad, and QVC studio tours. People can also explore Downtown West Chester, which features a selection of dining and retail options along with historical buildings.

West Chester is home to West Chester United SC, a lower level professional soccer club that currently competes in both the National Premier Soccer League and USL League Two. Home matches are played at Kildare's Field. The organization also fields a side in the United Soccer League of Pennsylvania, a fully-amateur state league.

== In popular culture ==
- Many of the skits on the MTV television series Jackass, and later Jackass: The Movie, were filmed in and around the borough, primarily those featuring Bam Margera and the CKY crew. The spin-off shows Viva La Bam and Bam's Unholy Union were filmed almost entirely in the area, as was the movie Haggard and the CKY videos.
- A documentary, Our Lady Of Victory, later released as The Mighty Macs, filmed many scenes in and around West Chester, including Jimmy Johns, and the Armory Building.
- Marley & Me, starring Jennifer Aniston and Owen Wilson, filmed scenes in West Chester in 2008.
- The Netflix American comedy series Tires (2024–present), starring Shane Gillis and Stavros Halkias, takes place in West Chester.
