= Townsendia =

Townsendia can refer to:

== Taxonomy ==
- Townsendia (fly), a genus of flies in the family Asilidae
- Townsendia (plant), a genus of plants in the family Asteraceae
