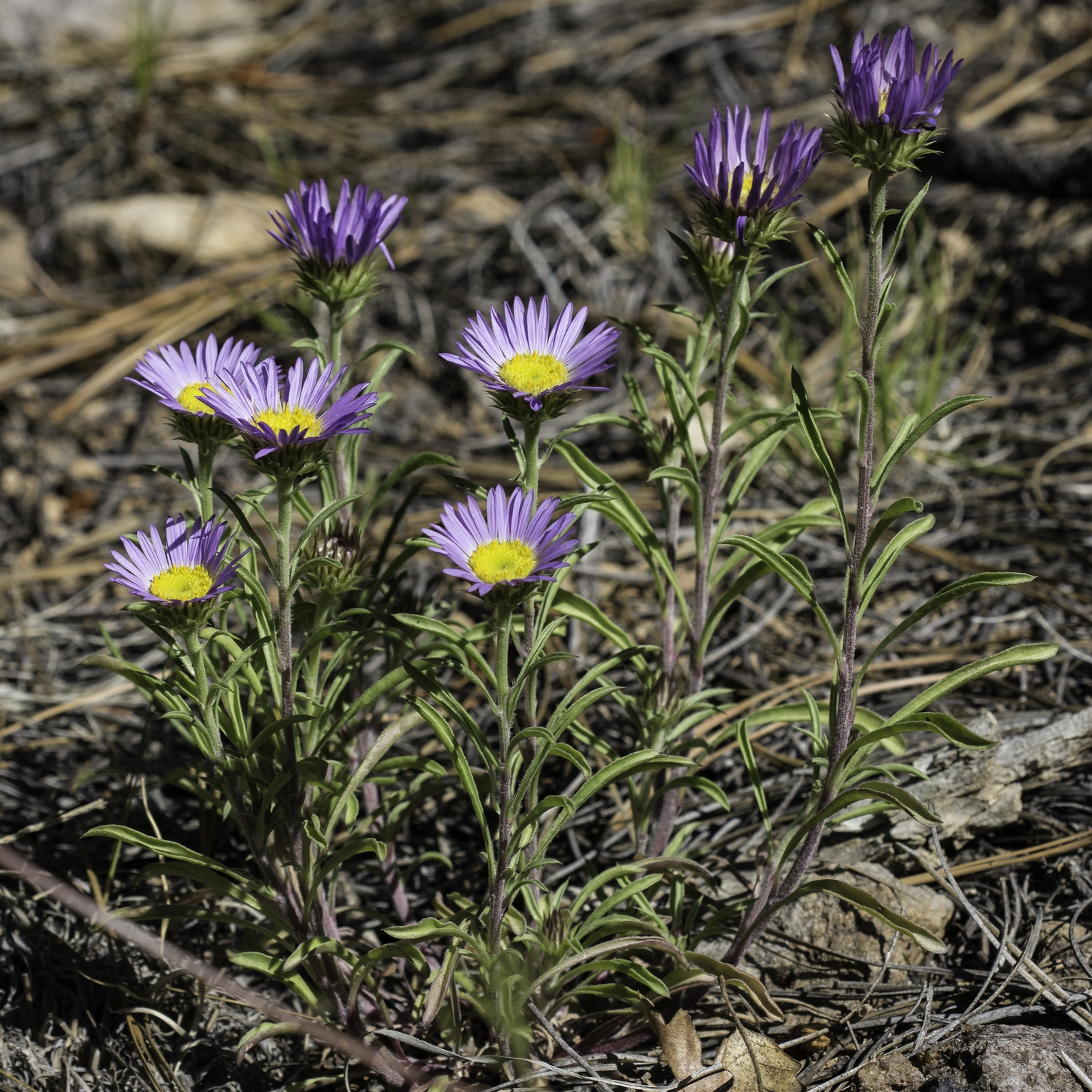
- In Bandelier National Monument, Los Alamos County, New Mexico

Conservation status
- Apparently Secure (NatureServe)

Scientific classification
- Kingdom: Plantae
- Clade: Tracheophytes
- Clade: Angiosperms
- Clade: Eudicots
- Clade: Asterids
- Order: Asterales
- Family: Asteraceae
- Genus: Townsendia
- Species: T. eximia

Binomial name
- Townsendia eximia A.Gray
- The county level distribution of Townsendia eximia in New Mexico and Colorado

Synonyms
- Townsendia vreelandii Rydb.

= Townsendia eximia =

Plant species in the daisy family

Townsendia eximia, commonly called the tall Townsend daisy and Rocky Mountain Townsend-daisy, is species in the daisy family in the genus Townsendia. It has relatively large showy flowers with blue-purple petals. It is mostly found in mountains of New Mexico, but also grows in far southern Colorado.

== Description ==
Townsendia eximia is a herbaceous species that may be a biennial or a perennial, but are normally biennials. Plants are usually 6 to 15 centimeters (2.4 to 5.9 in) tall, but from time to time can reach 30 cm (12 in). Plants have more or less erect stems that are strigose, covered in hairs that point the same direction, and occasionally can be rhizomatous. Usually the stems are unbranched and are often reddish in color. It is very similar to showy townsendia (Townsendia grandiflora), but taller.

The species has both cauline and basal leaves, ones that are attached to the stems or directly to the base of the plant, that are spatulate to oblanceolate in shape. They typically measure 1.5–6 centimeters long and just 2–6 millimeters in width, but can reach 12 cm long and 10 mm wide. The faces of the leaves are usually hairless, though sometimes sparsely covered in hairs, but the leaf edges are strigoso-ciliate, edged with straight hairs.

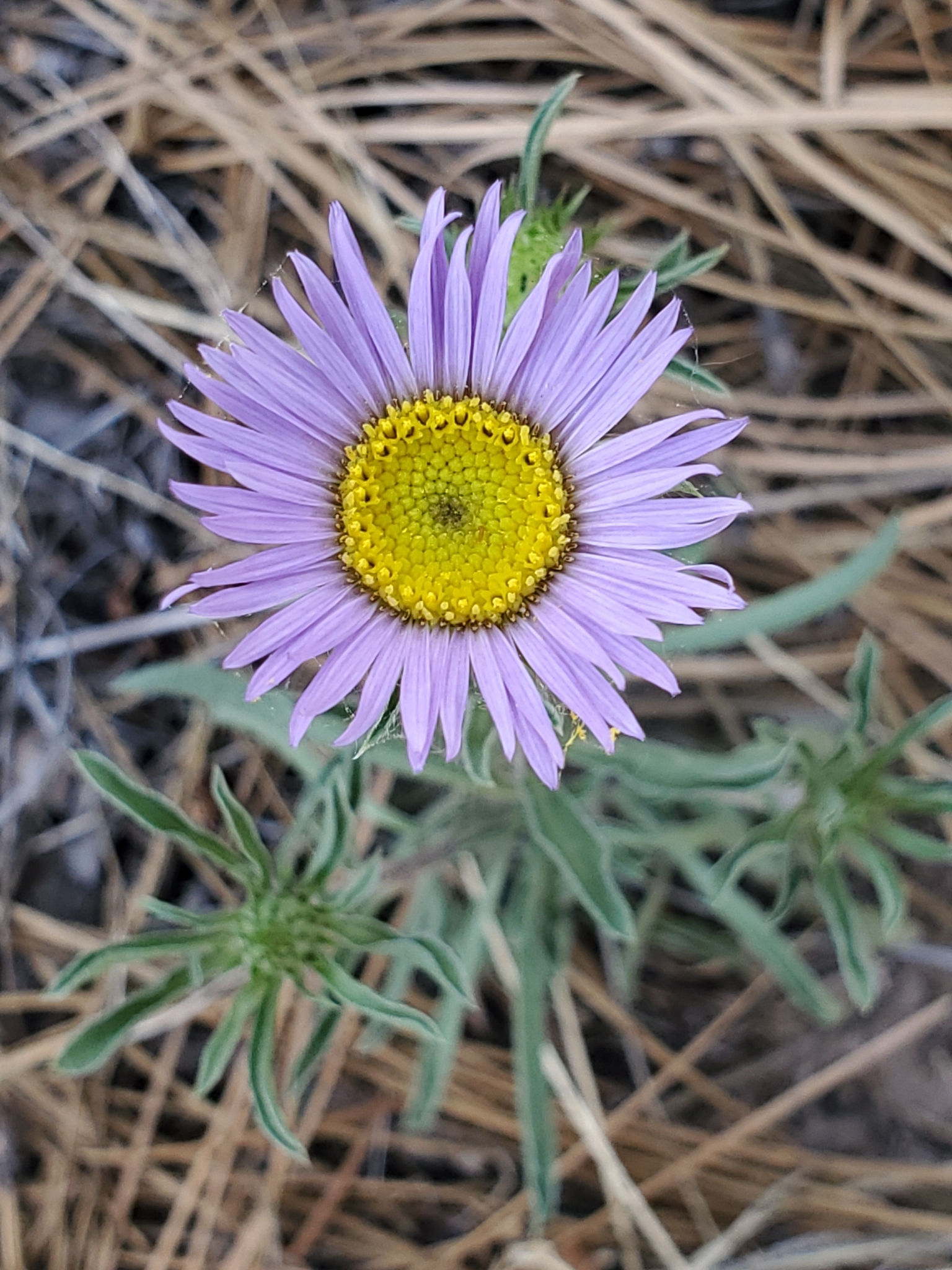
Close up of a single flowering head

The flowering heads are large and showy with Asa Gray saying that they are, "The most striking species of the genus..." Each flowering head is by itself at the end of a leafy stem. The involucre, the underside of the flowering head supporting the ray and disk flowers, is a half sphere or slightly broader in shape normally 12–25 mm in diameter, though infrequently as little as 8 mm. Each flowering head will can have as few as 15 or 55 or more ray flowers. They measure 8 to 20 mm long and are blue or somewhat purple in color.

== Taxonomy ==
Townsendia eximia was scientifically described and named by Asa Gray in 1849. Gray described the species using specimens collected by August Fendler during the military occupation of New Mexico during the Mexican–American War. Fendler collected specimens from the mountains around the Santa Fe River and the parries near the Mora River from June to August 1847. Townsendia eximia is classified in the Townsendia genus in the diverse Asteraceae family. It has one heterotypic synonym, Townsendia vreelandii, which was described by Per Axel Rydberg in 1901.

In the Tewa language it is called poƀì tsǎŋwæ'įŋ (poƀì, flower and tsǎŋwæ blue/green).

=== Names ===
It is known by the common names tall Townsend daisy and Rocky Mountain Townsend-daisy. It is also known as Easter daisy, however this name is more often applied to Townsendia hookeri.

== Range and habitat ==
Townsendia eximia grows in just two states, New Mexico and Colorado. The majority of its range is in central New Mexico as far south as Socorro and Torrance counties and north to the state line. In Colorado it is found in just four counties in near New Mexico, Conejos, Costilla, Huerfano , and Las Animas.

The species is associated with yellow pines, such as in ponderosa pine forests, with piñon–juniper woodlands, and also are found on gravelly banks and canyon walls. It most often grows at elevations of 2,100–2,500 meters (6,900–8,200 ft), but may sometimes be found as low as 1,900 m (6,200 ft) or as high as 3,300 m (10,800 ft).

=== Conservation ===
The conservation organization NatureServe evaluated Townsendia eximia in 1988 and rated it as apparently secure at the global level (G4). In Colorado they rated it as vulnerable (S3), but they did not give the species a rating for its range in New Mexico.

== Cultivation ==
The tall townsend daisy is cultivated and sold as a garden plant, particularly for use in western native plant gardening and rock gardens. Rock gardeners regard the species as easy to grow from seed, like Townsendia parryi and Townsendia exscapa.
