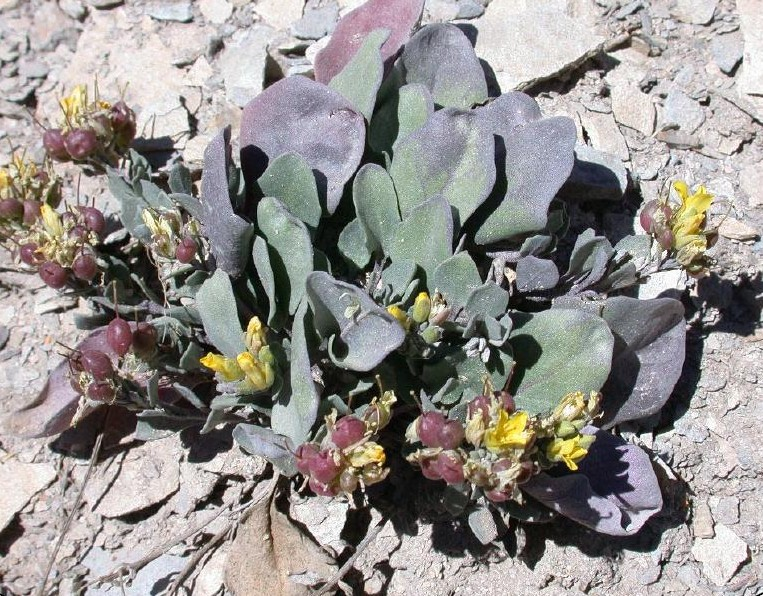

Conservation status
- Imperiled (NatureServe)

Scientific classification
- Kingdom: Plantae
- Clade: Tracheophytes
- Clade: Angiosperms
- Clade: Eudicots
- Clade: Rosids
- Order: Brassicales
- Family: Brassicaceae
- Genus: Physaria
- Species: P. pruinosa

Binomial name
- Physaria pruinosa (Greene) O’Kane & Al-Shehbaz

Synonyms
- Lesquerella pruinosa Greene

= Physaria pruinosa =

Species of flowering plant

Physaria pruinosa (syn. Lesquerella pruinosa) is a species of flowering plant in the family Brassicaceae known by the common names Pagosa Springs bladderpod and frosty bladderpod. It is native to Colorado and New Mexico in the United States.

This plant is a perennial herb growing from a caudex which is clothed in the dried leaf blades of previous seasons. It is coated in short hairs, giving it a frosted look and giving it one of its common names. The decumbent or erect stems grow up to 20 centimeters long. The variously shaped leaves are up to 8 centimeters long. The inflorescence is a dense raceme of flowers with yellow petals roughly a centimeter long. The fruit is an inflated pod just under a centimeter long which is glossy and copper-colored. Flowering occurs in May through August.

This plant occurs in the foothills of the San Juan Mountains. Its distribution runs through Archuleta and Hinsdale Counties in Colorado and Rio Arriba County, New Mexico, with its center near Pagosa Springs, Colorado. The land is managed by the United States Forest Service and the Bureau of Land Management, and part of the distribution lies on private land and the Southern Ute Indian Reservation.

The habitat is made up of barrens and grasslands with the gray clay soils derived from the Mancos Shale. There are some occurrences near Ponderosa pines and Gambel oaks. It is also associated with Douglas-fir and Engelmann spruce. The plants grow in open areas, but can tolerate some shade. They are adapted to disturbed sites, as they grow on shales which are constantly crumbling and eroding. It can also grow on artificially disturbed sites such as roadsides and it can colonize bare soils. Associated plants include Arizona fescue, rushy milkvetch, mountain snowberry, sun sedge, Woods' rose, and Gray's Townsend daisy. It can be found growing with the rare species Pagosa skyrocket and Rothrock's Townsend daisy.

The greatest threats to the survival of this plant are forces that destroy its habitat. These include development, off-road vehicle use, energy exploration and development, introduced species, herbicides, and grazing. Development in the vicinity of Pagosa Springs, Colorado, is probably the worst threat. Its habitat is currently being consumed for residential and commercial development. Roads are being constructed, destroying habitat and facilitating the spread of weeds that compete with the plant. Archuleta County, Colorado, "is one of the fastest growing counties in the United States."

Estimates of the total number of plants remaining are anywhere between 5,209 and 20,619, with one estimate being 12,852 individuals.
