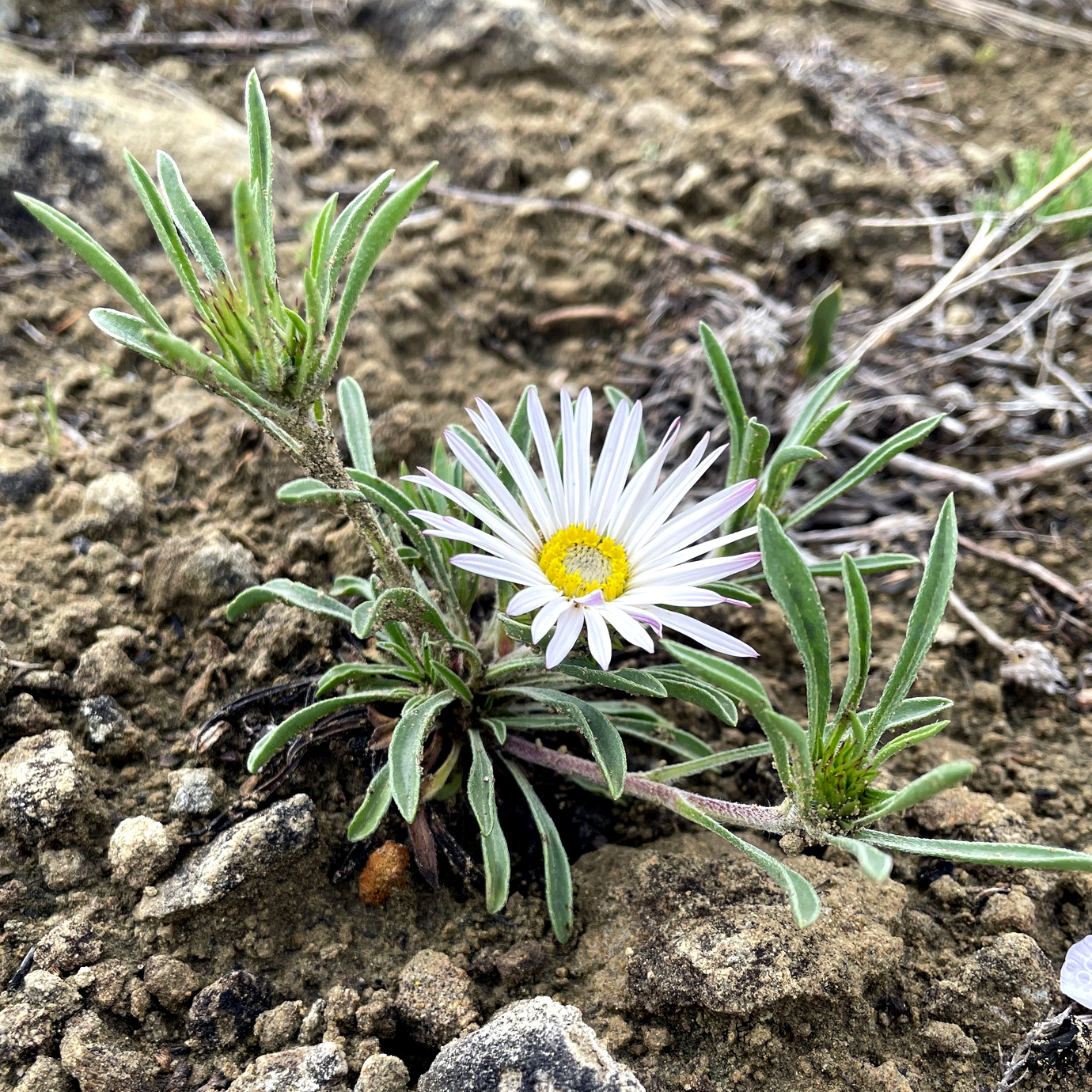
- Townsendia grandiflora near Fort Collins, Colorado

Conservation status
- Apparently Secure (NatureServe)

Scientific classification
- Kingdom: Plantae
- Clade: Tracheophytes
- Clade: Angiosperms
- Clade: Eudicots
- Clade: Asterids
- Order: Asterales
- Family: Asteraceae
- Genus: Townsendia
- Species: T. grandiflora

Binomial name
- Townsendia grandiflora Nutt.

= Townsendia grandiflora =

Species of flowering plant in the family

Townsendia grandiflora, commonly called largeflower ground-daisy, largeflower townsendia, or showy townsendia is an inconspicuous plant of the foothills of the Rocky Mountains and nearby shortgrass prairies. They are usually found in somewhat eroded or rocky areas such as the sides of hills, banks, and mesas. They are part of the Townsendia genus, which can be difficult for both amateur and expert botanists to correctly identify. A short-lived plant, they are nonetheless grown by rock garden enthusiasts for their relatively large daisy-like flowers.

== Description ==
Townsendia grandiflora is a small herbaceous plant that commonly grows 3–15 centimeters tall, but may be as tall as 30 centimeters or hug the ground at just 2 centimeters in exceptional circumstances. The stems grow from a substantial woody taproot. Generally the stems of T. grandiflora branch near the base of the plant, but occasionally they may branch further up a stem. The stems may be erect or lay on the ground and are covered in hairs that all point in the same direction (strigose). The distance between nodes where leaves attach on the stems is normally 2–25 millimeters, but may be up to 50 millimeters.

The leaves of Townsendia grandiflora attach to both the base and the stems of the plant. They may be spoon shaped (spatulate), shaped like a reversed lance head with the wider portion past the midpoint (oblanceolate), or narrow like a blade of grass. The leaves are usually 2–4 centimeters long (occasionally as long as 9 centimeters) and 0.1–0.5 centimeters wide, but may occasionally reach one centimeter in width. Their faces are fairly smooth, occasionally having sparse hairs, with rough midribs.

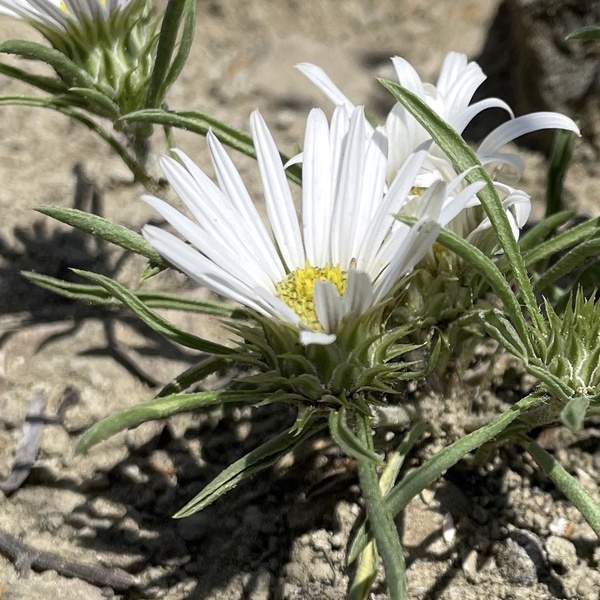
Townsendia grandiflora flower side view

The flowering heads are located at the end of the stems, with only one on each stem. The bract-covered supporting base of the flowers packed together into the flowering head (the involucre) is a half sphere in shape and usually 10–14 millimeters in diameter, though it may be as little as 8 millimeters. The bracts are longer than they are wide. They are widest in the middle and taper to a long point (acuminate) with bristly hairs. Usually they are 8–10 millimeters long, but occasionally are longer than 12 millimeters.

The flowering head will have 20 to 40 ray flowers arranged around the edge with the showy petals 7–15 millimeters long, though occasionally they may be longer than 20 millimeters. The ray flowers are predominately white, but will often have a slight pink or purple tint or even be quite violet. The tip of each ray petal has a very small, single notch.

The tightly-packed disk flowers in the center of the flowering head are yellow, but have also been described as greenish-yellow. There are usually 80 to more than 120 disk flowers, but occasionally will be as few as 60. Their petals are 4–6 millimeters long. In their native habitat they bloom any time from June through August, with occasional stragglers still flowering in September.

The seeds of Townsendia grandiflora (technically called a cypselae, but often incorrectly called an achene) are 3.5 to more than 4 millimeters long. They have a hairy surface and a persistent pappus that is longer than the seed.

The relatives that most closely resemble Townsendia grandiflora are Townsendia eximia and Townsendia formosa. Townsendia eximia grows in Colorado and New Mexico and has slightly more and longer bracts (usually 12–13 mm) on a moderately bigger involucre (12–25 mm). The range of Townsendia grandiflora only overlaps a very small amount with that of Townsendia formosa in New Mexico. The flowers of T. formosa are generally larger, with longer petals (10–15 mm) and a wider disk (12–18 mm). Its bracts have a blunt to pointed end without a tapering tip.

== Taxonomy ==
Townsendia grandiflora was given its first scientific description by the botanist Thomas Nuttall in a presentation read on 2 October 1840 to the American Philosophical Society. He described it as being from the "Black Hills, (or eastern chain of the Rocky Mountains)" and noted its attractive flowers, saying, "A plant which well deserves cultivation...".

As of 2024, no subspecies of this plant have been described and no taxonomic synonyms have been created. However, there is occasionally some confusion caused by the identically named genus of flies.

=== Names ===
Describing its appearance, it is commonly called the "largeflower ground-daisy". It is also commonly called variations of its scientific name such as "large-flowered townsendia", "largeflower townsendia" or "showy townsendia". Confusingly, it is also sometimes called the "largeflower Easter daisy" or "late Easter daisy" even though its flowering period is after the Easter season. A common name sometimes encountered in books prior to 1920 is "bad land blue aster".

== Distribution and habitat ==
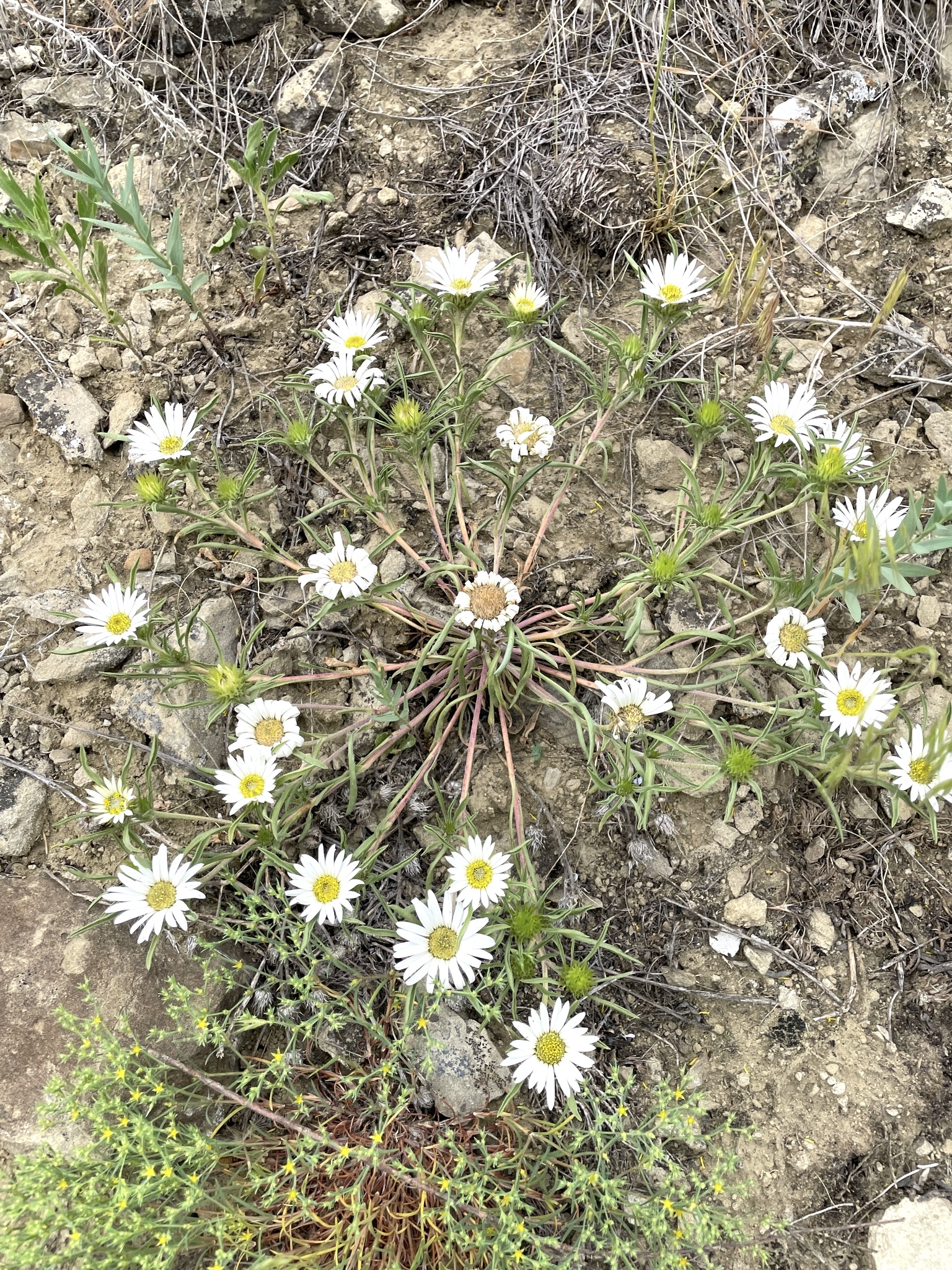

Townsendia grandiflora grows in the western United States at elevations from 1300 to 2400 meters. It grows wild in five states, South Dakota, Nebraska, Wyoming, Colorado, and New Mexico. In South Dakota it has been recorded only in the southwest of the state. T. grandiflora is found in the east of Wyoming, especially towards the south and in the western areas of Nebraska. In Colorado it is found in the foothills and the high plains near the foothills of the Rocky Mountains in the eastern half of the state. In New Mexico it is primarily found in the north of the northern counties of the state, and one central county.

It is commonly found on the dry slopes of foothills and mesas, in grasslands, and on eroded shales that contain gypsum. It often grows on sandy soils in Nebraska and Wyoming or on strongly sloped clay banks in Colorado.

=== Conservation ===
NatureServe has not evaluated Townsendia grandiflora since 1988. At that time, they evaluated its global status as "apparently secure", G4. They also evaluated it as S4 in Wyoming and "vulnerable", S3 in South Dakota while not evaluating it in the other states of its distribution.

== Ecology ==
The effects of cattle grazing on Townsendia grandiflora are unclear, with one study finding plants in ungrazed and intensely grazed rangeland after 55 years, and finding no plants in light or moderately grazed areas. The roots of the partially parasitic plant bastard toadflax (Comandra umbellata) attach to the roots of Townsendia grandiflora along with most other perennial plants examined in its range. It is a host for the rust species Puccinia hordei.

== Cultivation ==
Largeflower ground-daisy is grown in rock gardens, even outside its native range. It requires well-drained soil and is grown in troughs in wet climates to better control soil conditions and moisture levels. When a suitable soil is not available, they can grow in a mixture of equal parts well-composted leaves and sand. They prefer half-sun conditions where they receive direct sun for only part of the day or a west facing position with shade from the south. Propagation is by seed. Ground-daisies, including the largeflower, are not long lived plants.
