= Townsendia glabella =

Scientific classification
- Kingdom: Plantae
- Clade: Tracheophytes
- Clade: Angiosperms
- Clade: Eudicots
- Clade: Asterids
- Order: Asterales
- Family: Asteraceae
- Genus: Townsendia
- Species: T. glabella

Binomial name
- Townsendia glabella A.Gray

Plant species in the sunflower family

Townsendia glabella is a rare plant in the sunflower family that only grows in southwestern Colorado.

== Description ==
Townsendia glabella is a small flower, getting no more than 1 to 5 centimeters (0.39–1.97 in) tall. It has flower heads with 12 to more than 34 white, petal-like ray flowers around their edges. The petals with sometimes be blue or pink on their upper surface and are 5–14 millimeters long.

== Taxonomy ==
Townsendia glabella was scientifically described and named in 1880 by Asa Gray. It is part of the Townsendia genus, which is classified in the Asteraceae family. It has no botanical synonyms or subspecies. It is very similar to Townsendia rothrockii and the botanist John L. Strother suggested in the Flora of North America that it might be considered a synonym of that species.

=== Names ===
The scientific name, glabella, means 'smooth' in Botanical Latin; it is similarly known as the smooth Townsend daisy. It is also known by the common names Gray's Townsend daisy or Gray's Easter daisy.

== Range and habitat ==
Townsendia glabella is endemic to Colorado. According to NatureServe it grows in just four counties in the southwestern corner of the state, Archuleta, La Plata, Montezuma, and Rio Grande counties in the southwestern corner of the state; however the second edition of the Flora of Colorado also lists it in Mesa and Montrose counties in the west. It grows at elevations of 2,100–2,600 meters (6,900–8,500 ft) shale slopes and dry places within pine forests.

=== Conservation ===
The conservation organization NatureServe evaluated Townsendia glabella in 2024 and rated it as vulnerable. They report 35 populations, but just 6 with good or excellent viability.
