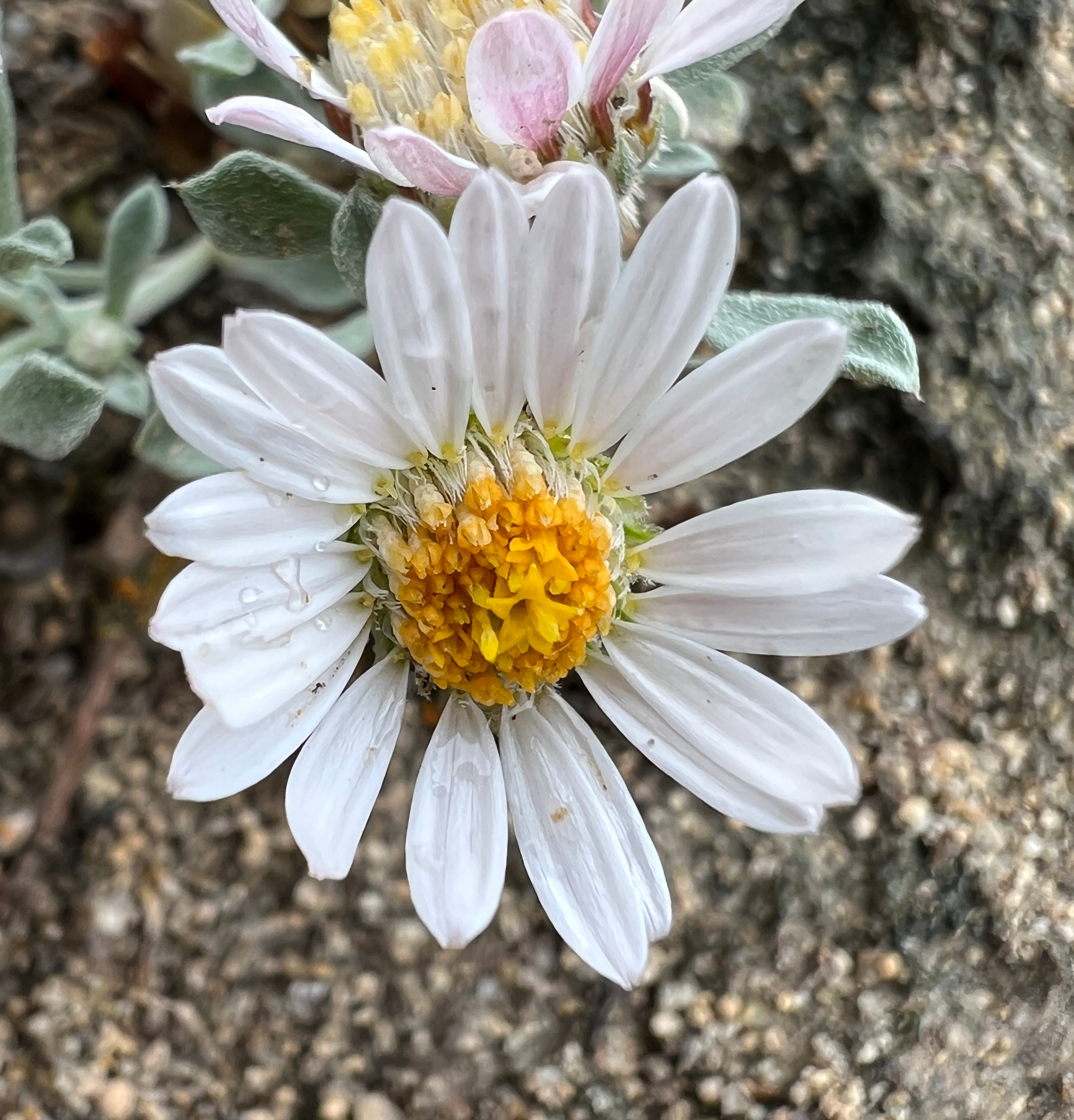

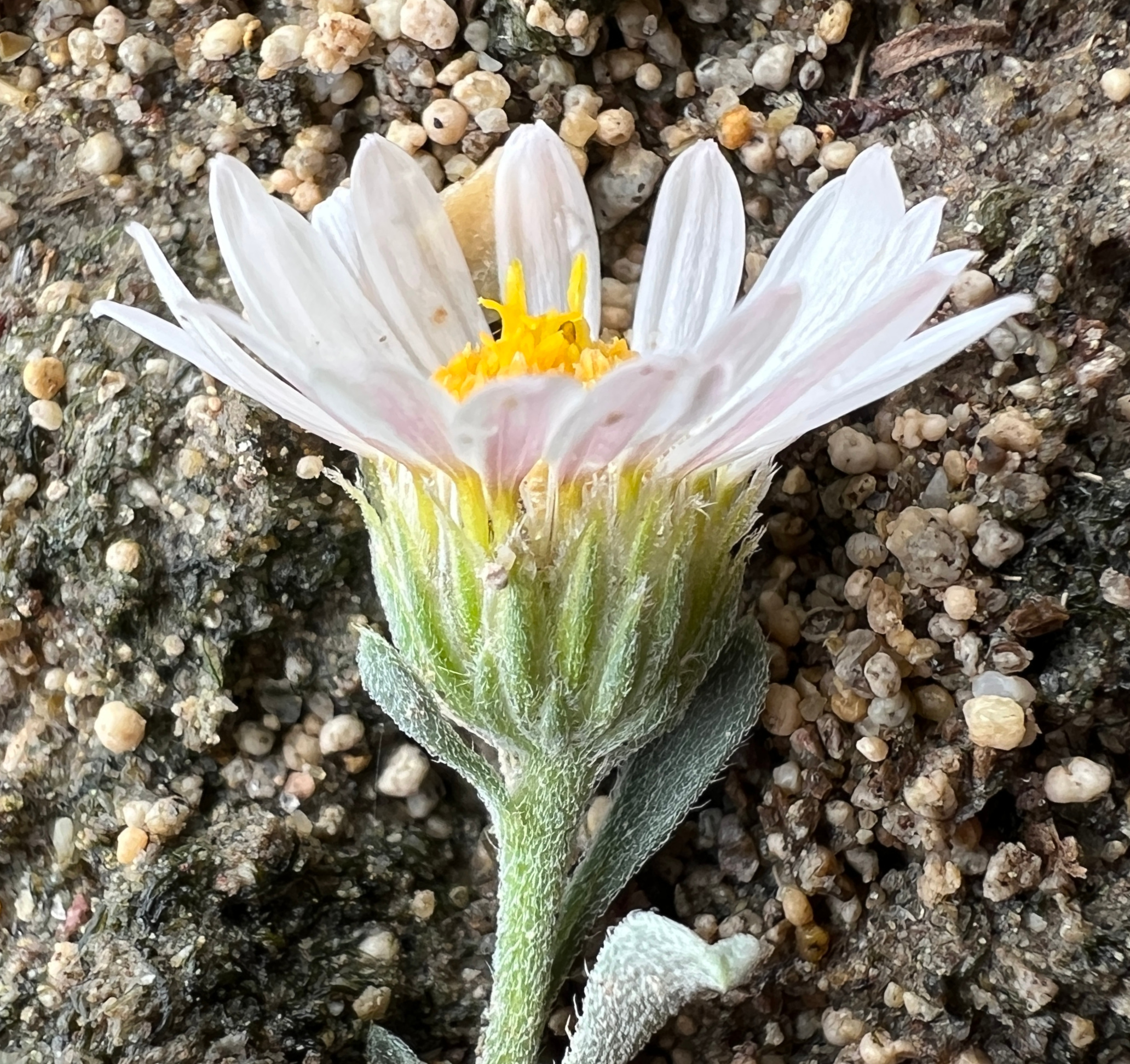

Scientific classification
- Kingdom: Plantae
- Clade: Tracheophytes
- Clade: Angiosperms
- Clade: Eudicots
- Clade: Asterids
- Order: Asterales
- Family: Asteraceae
- Genus: Townsendia
- Species: T. florifera

Binomial name
- Townsendia florifera (Hook.) A.Gray

= Townsendia florifera =

Species of plant

Townsendia florifera is a low growing herbaceous flowering plant in the family Asteraceae, with the common name showy Townsendia.

== Description ==
Townsendia florifera is an annual, biennial or perennial herb from a persistent base. The green basal leaves are spatulate to spatulate-obovate, 2-6 cm long and 3-11 mm wide, with cauline leaves similar or reduced. Leaves, stems, and floral bracts are sparsely to moderately-densely covered with short white hairs. The showy composite flowers are usually solitary on each short stem, with somewhat imbricate green bracts (overlapping segments) that are narrow and pointed with fringed margins. The 10 to 20 ray florets are light pink to nearly white and 7-12 mm long. Disk florets are numerous and yellow.

== Range and habitat ==
Townsendia florifera grows in dry open areas in the northwestern to west-central United States, often with sagebrush in gravelly or sandy areas. The range is central Washington and Oregon, southern Idaho, eastern Nevada, and western Utah, Montana, and Wyoming.

== Gallery ==
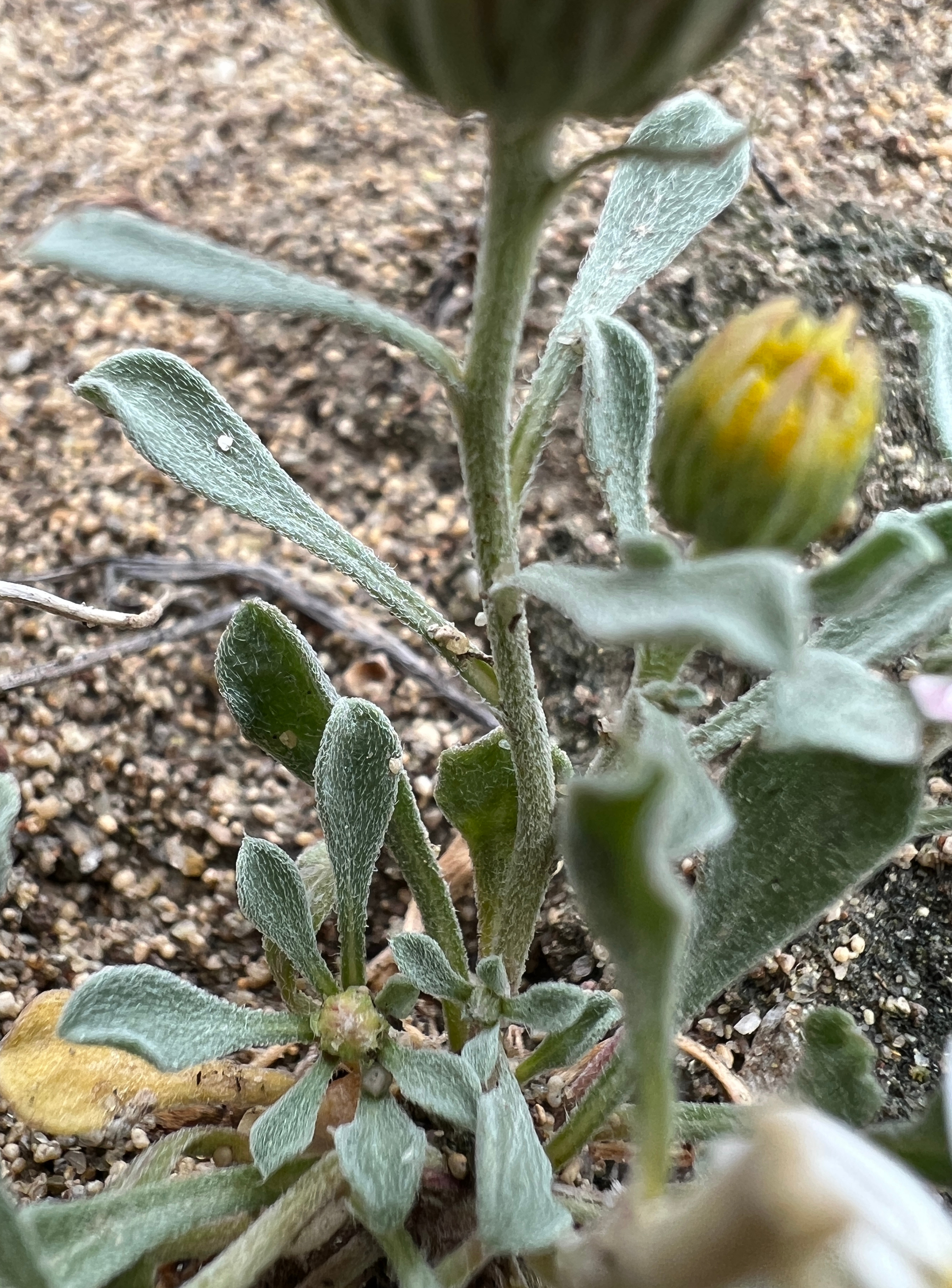
Leaves and stem

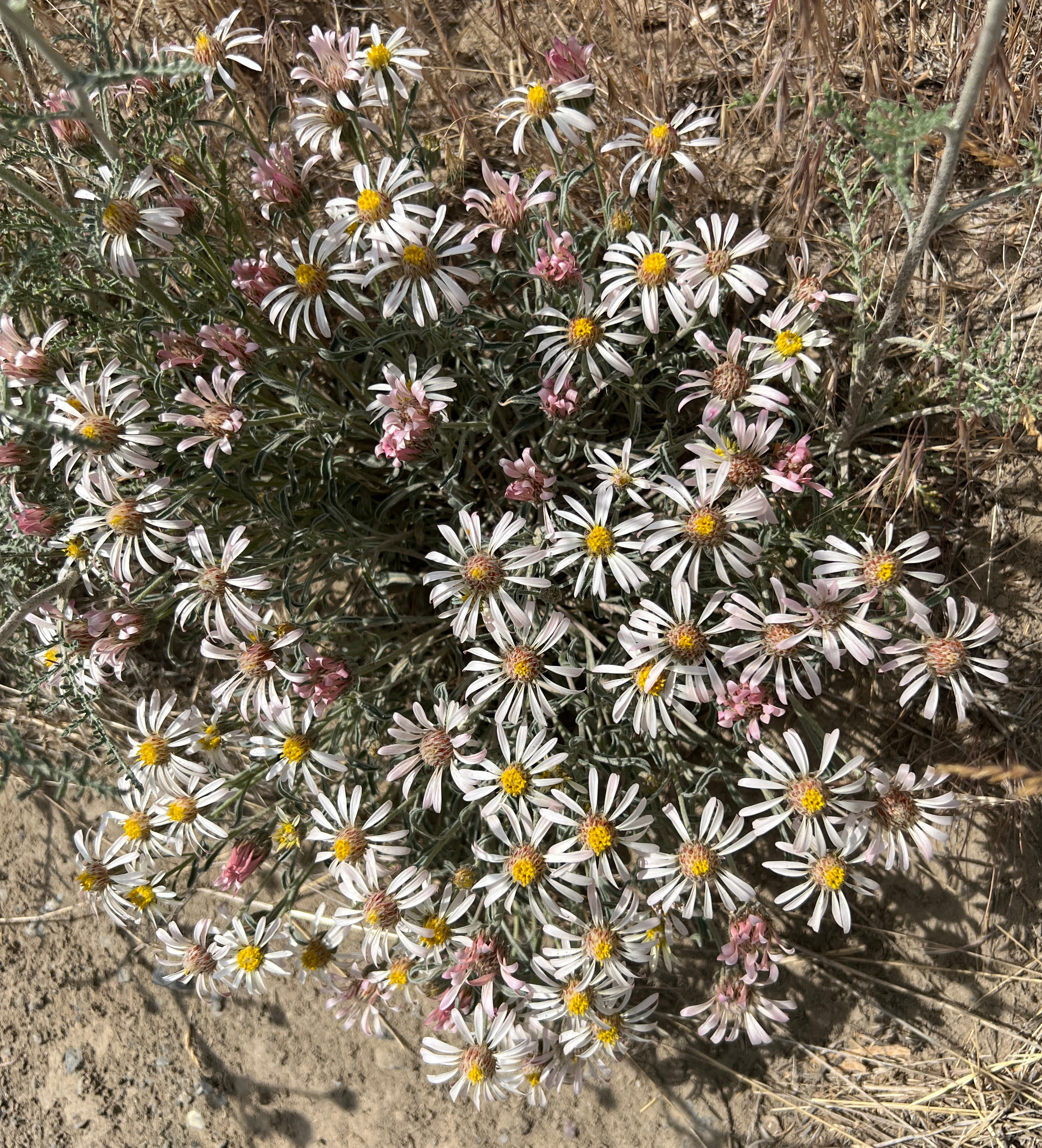
Whole plant
