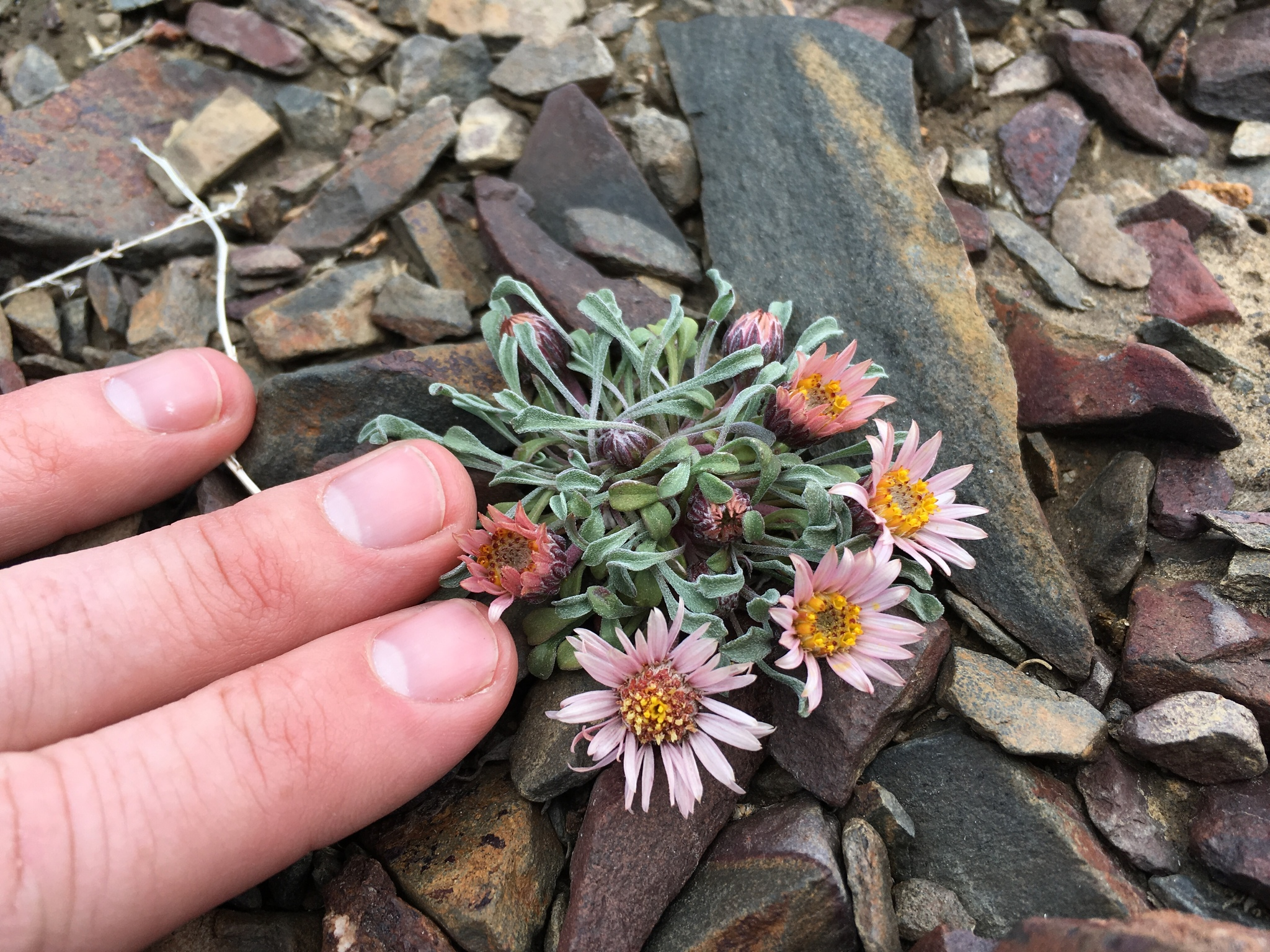

Scientific classification
- Kingdom: Plantae
- Clade: Tracheophytes
- Clade: Angiosperms
- Clade: Eudicots
- Clade: Asterids
- Order: Asterales
- Family: Asteraceae
- Genus: Townsendia
- Species: T. scapigera

Binomial name
- Townsendia scapigera (A.Gray) Osterh.

= Townsendia scapigera =

Species of flowering plant

Townsendia scapigera is a species of flowering plant in the family Asteraceae known by the common name tufted Townsend daisy. It is native to the western United States, where it grows in mountains, sagebrush, and other habitat.

It is a small perennial herb taking a clumped form just a few centimeters tall, its herbage growing on a caudex and taproot unit. The leaves are up to 5 centimeters long and coated in rough hairs. The inflorescence bears flower heads on erect peduncles, each head measuring 1 to 3 centimeters wide with hairy phyllaries. Each head contains many yellow disc florets and many white, pinkish, or purplish ray florets each measuring up to 1.6 centimeters in length.

The fruit is a hairy achene tipped with a pappus of bristles.
