= Townsendia nigra =

Scientific classification
- Domain: Eukaryota
- Kingdom: Animalia
- Phylum: Arthropoda
- Class: Insecta
- Order: Diptera
- Family: Asilidae
- Genus: Townsendia
- Species: T. nigra

Binomial name
- Townsendia nigra Back, 1909

Synonyms
- Townsendia niger Back, 1909

Species of fly

Townsendia nigra is a species of robber fly in the family Asilidae.
