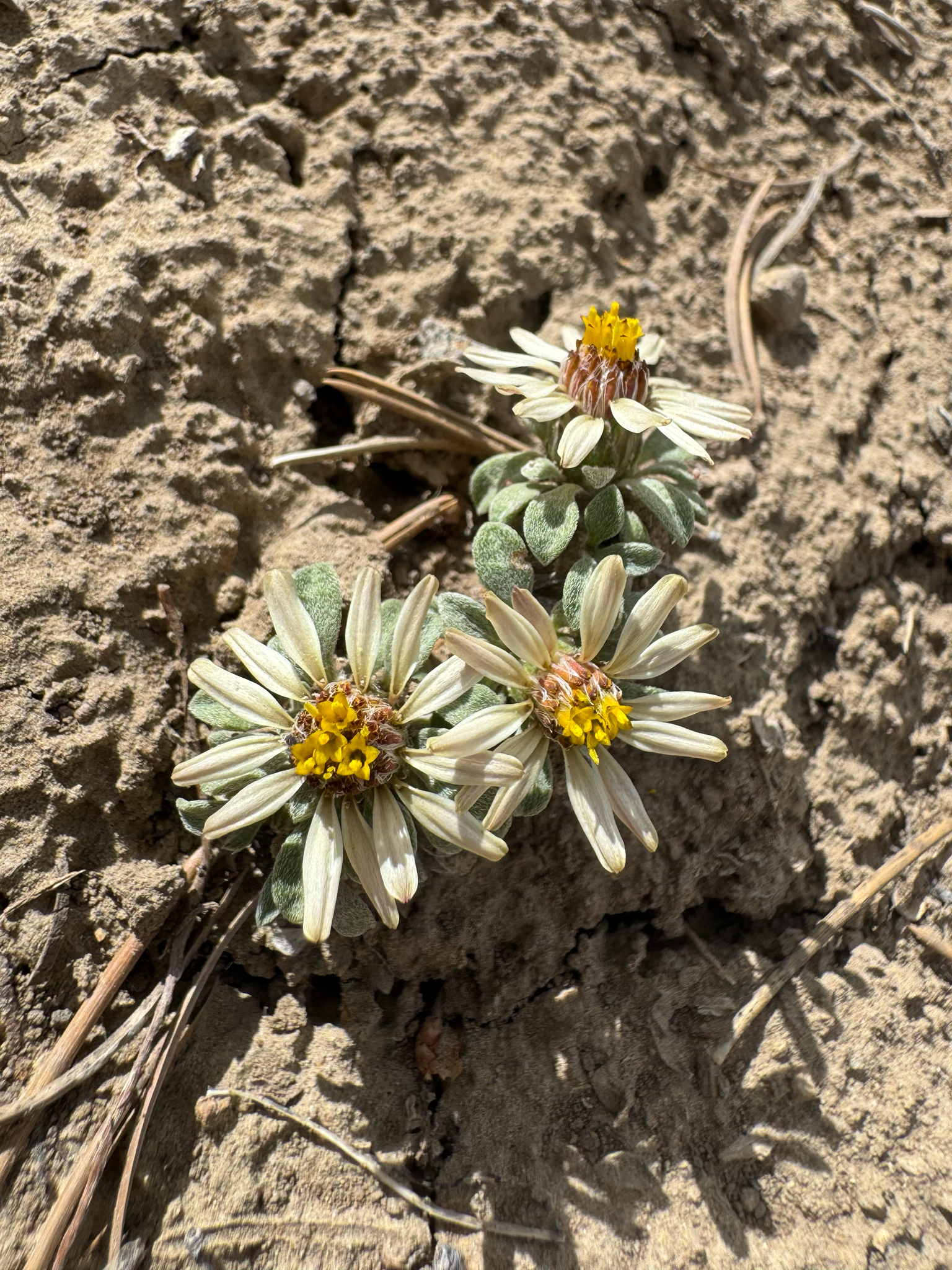

Conservation status
- Imperiled (NatureServe)

Scientific classification
- Kingdom: Plantae
- Clade: Tracheophytes
- Clade: Angiosperms
- Clade: Eudicots
- Clade: Asterids
- Order: Asterales
- Family: Asteraceae
- Genus: Townsendia
- Species: T. aprica

Binomial name
- Townsendia aprica S.L.Welsh & Reveal

= Townsendia aprica =

Species of flowering plant

Townsendia aprica is a rare species of flowering plant in the family Asteraceae known by the common name Last Chance Townsend daisy. It is endemic to Utah in the United States, where it is known from three counties. It faces a number of threats and it is a federally listed threatened species of the United States.

This plant is a perennial herb forming a clump just a few centimeters wide and one or two centimeters tall. The rough-haired spatula-shaped leaves are generally under a centimeter long but may be slightly longer. The flower heads lie directly on top of the clump rather than erect on stalks. Each head contains up to 21 ray florets roughly half a centimeter long. They are yellow orange in color, aging cream or white. The flower gets its species name from the apricot shade of its ray florets. There are many disc florets at the center. The fruit is an achene with a pappus of scales; the ray and disc florets produce fruits that differ in appearance. The flowers are pollinated by several species of bees, including Ceratina nanula, Synhalonia fulvitarsis, Dioxys pomonae, Stelis pavonina, and many species of Osmia.

The plant was discovered in 1966 near Last Chance Creek south of the Fremont Junction in Utah. Today there are 15 known occurrences in Sevier, Wayne, and Emery Counties for a total of about 6000 plants. Some occurrences are in the San Rafael Swell and there is one in Capitol Reef National Park. The plants occur in sparsely vegetated openings in pinyon-juniper woodland habitat. They are generally restricted to pockets of shale lens soils surrounded by less hospitable soil types. The shale soil is derived from the Mancos Formation and is silty and alkaline. Other plants in the habitat include blue grama (Bouteloua gracilis), black sagebrush (Artemisia nova), shadscale (Atriplex confertifolia), and snakeweed (Gutierrezia sarothrae). Other rare plants in the area include Despain's pincushion cactus (Pediocactus despainii), Wright's fishhook cactus (Sclerocactus wrightiae), and Barneby reed-mustard (Hesperidanthus barnebyi).

Threats to this species include construction of roads, livestock grazing and trampling, off-road vehicle use, and petroleum exploration and development. Coal mining was a particularly severe threat when the plant was added to the Endangered Species List. Most populations of the plant are on land laced with seams of coal.
