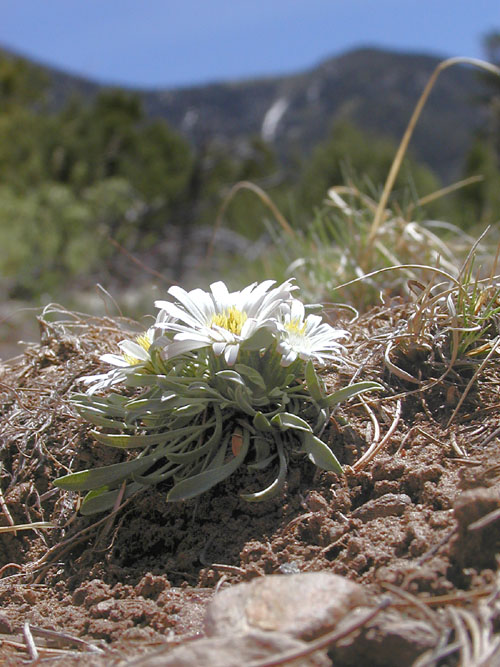

Scientific classification
- Kingdom: Plantae
- Clade: Embryophytes
- Clade: Tracheophytes
- Clade: Spermatophytes
- Clade: Angiosperms
- Clade: Eudicots
- Clade: Asterids
- Order: Asterales
- Family: Asteraceae
- Genus: Townsendia
- Species: T. exscapa

Binomial name
- Townsendia exscapa Porter 1894

= Townsendia exscapa =

Species of flowering plant

Townsendia exscapa, commonly referred to as Easter daisy or stemless Townsend daisy, is species in the daisy family in the genus Townsendia. It is a low-lying perennial found in openings of pine forests and meadows. Distribution of the flower includes Alberta, Manitoba, Saskatchewan, through the Dakotas down to Texas and Chihuahua, Mexico, and also extending westward to Idaho, Nevada, and Arizona.

== Description ==
Blooming in March through July, the white flowers have a very short stem, just reaching 1 in (25 mm) in height. Leaves of the plant are noted to extend longer than the ray florets, a feature common throughout the Asteraceae family. They remain easily-overlooked by growing close to the ground in mats, early in the season, and being short-lived.

== Etymology ==
Genus Townsendia is named in honor of amateur botanist David Townsend. Species name "exscapa" derives from "ex" as in "without" and "scap" or "shaft", referring to the appearance of the flowers being stemless.
