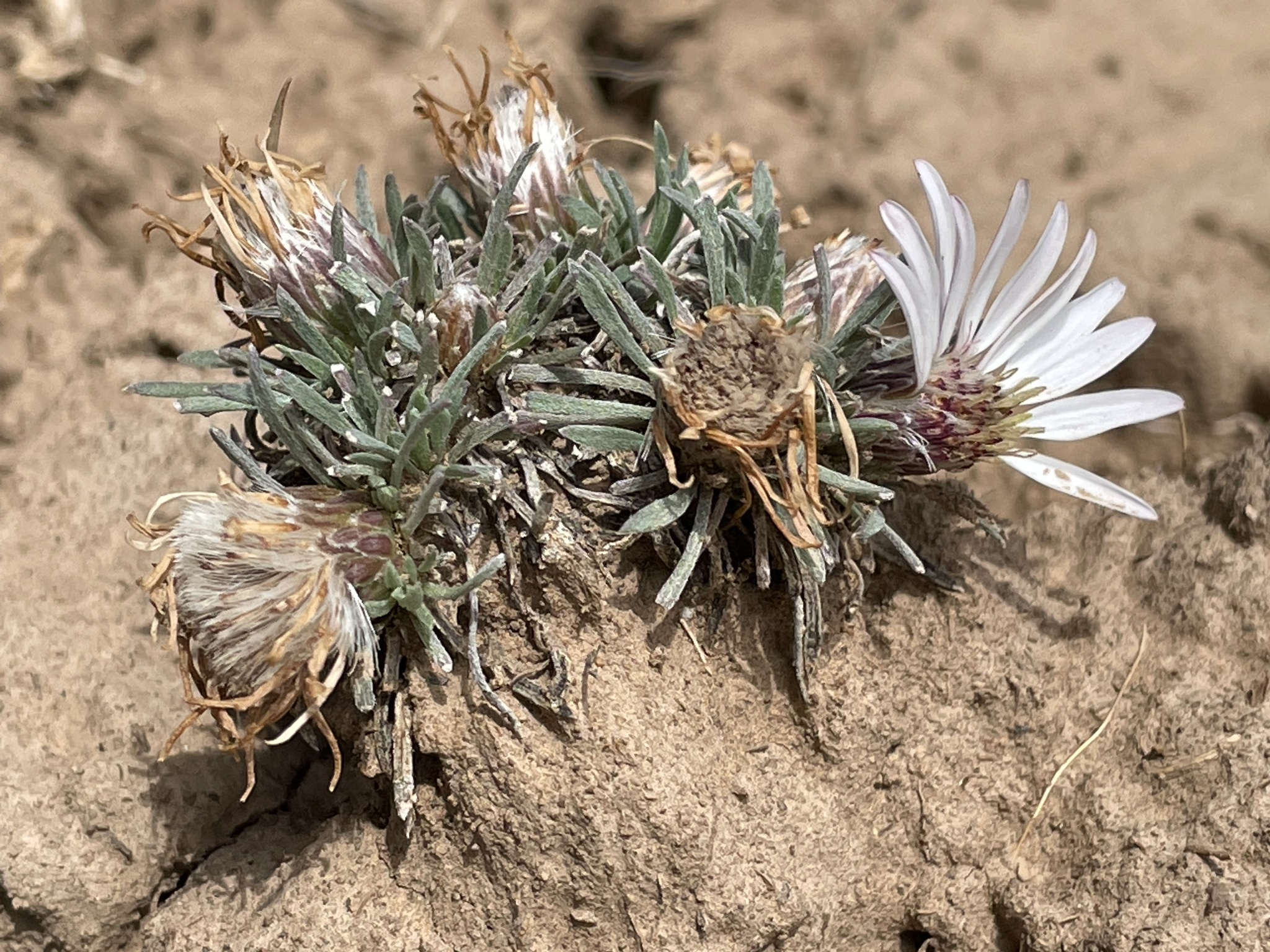

Conservation status
- Apparently Secure (NatureServe)

Scientific classification
- Kingdom: Plantae
- Clade: Tracheophytes
- Clade: Angiosperms
- Clade: Eudicots
- Clade: Asterids
- Order: Asterales
- Family: Asteraceae
- Genus: Townsendia
- Species: T. leptotes

Binomial name
- Townsendia leptotes (A.Gray) Osterh.

Synonyms
- Townsendia lepotes (A.Gray) Osterh.; Townsendia sericea var. leptotes A.Gray

= Townsendia leptotes =

Species of flowering plant

Townsendia leptotes is a species of flowering plant in the family Asteraceae known by the common names common Townsend daisy and slender townsendia. It is native to the western United States, where it grows in the alpine climates of high mountain ranges from California to Montana to New Mexico.

This is a petite perennial herb taking a clumped form just a few centimeters tall, its herbage growing on a caudex and taproot unit. The leaves are one to two centimeters long, linear or lance-shaped, and coated in rough hairs. The plant blooms in a profusion of flower heads each one to two centimeters wide with hairy to hairless, lance-shaped phyllaries. Each head contains many yellow disc florets and many white, pinkish, or blue ray florets each measuring roughly a centimeter in length. Occasionally, heads lack disc florets. The fruit is a hairless achene tipped with a pappus of bristles.
