= Townsendia albomacula =

Scientific classification
- Domain: Eukaryota
- Kingdom: Animalia
- Phylum: Arthropoda
- Class: Insecta
- Order: Diptera
- Family: Asilidae
- Genus: Townsendia
- Species: T. albomacula

Binomial name
- Townsendia albomacula Martin, 1966

Species of fly

Townsendia albomacula is a species of robber fly in the family Asilidae.
