= Josiah Hoopes =

American botanist and nurseryman

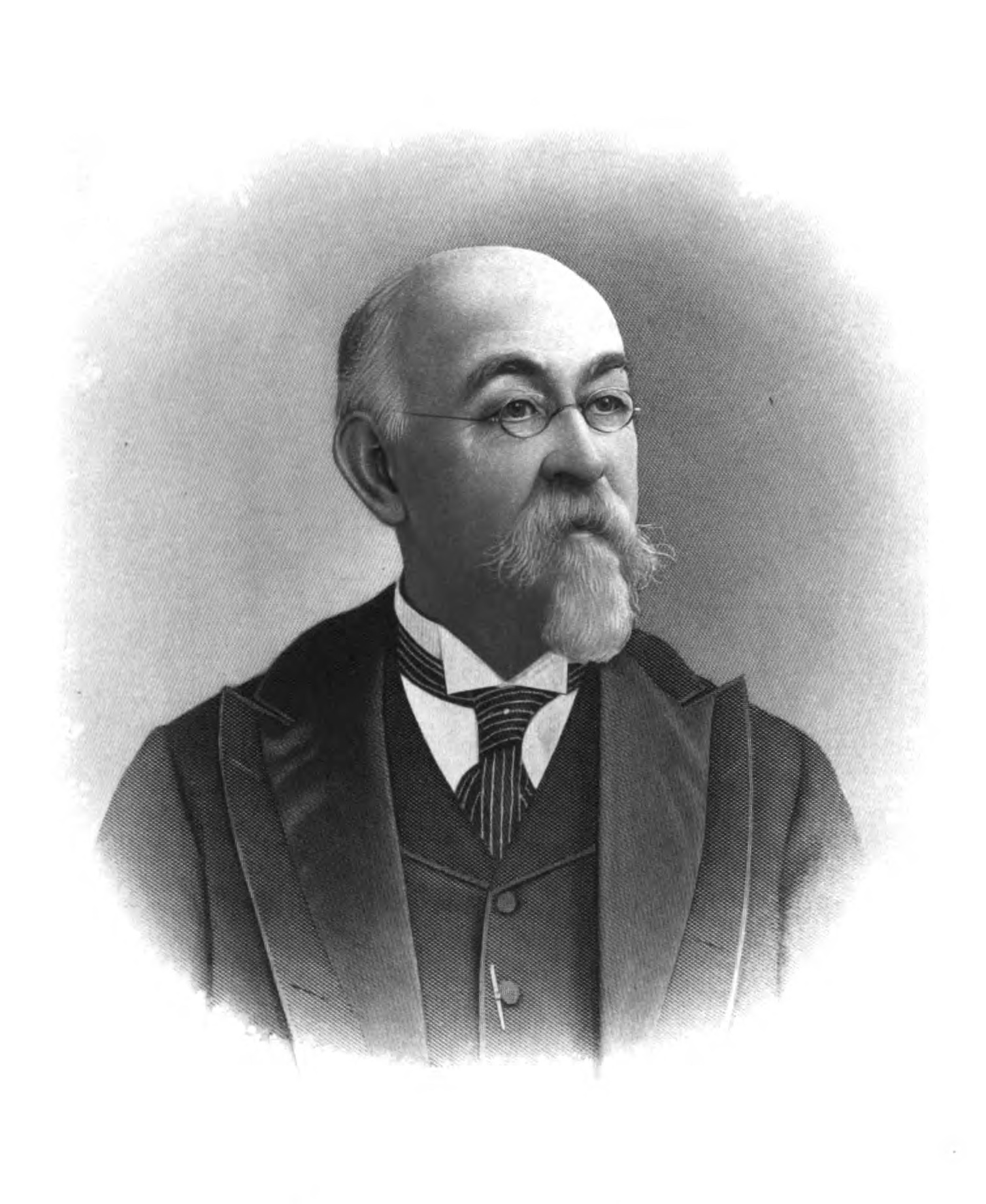
- Hoopes circa 1898
- Born: November 9, 1832; West Chester, Pennsylvania, US
- Died: January 16, 1904 (aged 71); West Chester, Pennsylvania
- Occupation(s): Botanist, nurseryman

Josiah Hoopes (November 9, 1832 – January 16, 1904) was an American botanist specializing in arboriculture. He founded one of the largest commercial plant nurseries in the United States in his hometown of West Chester, Pennsylvania.

== Life and career ==
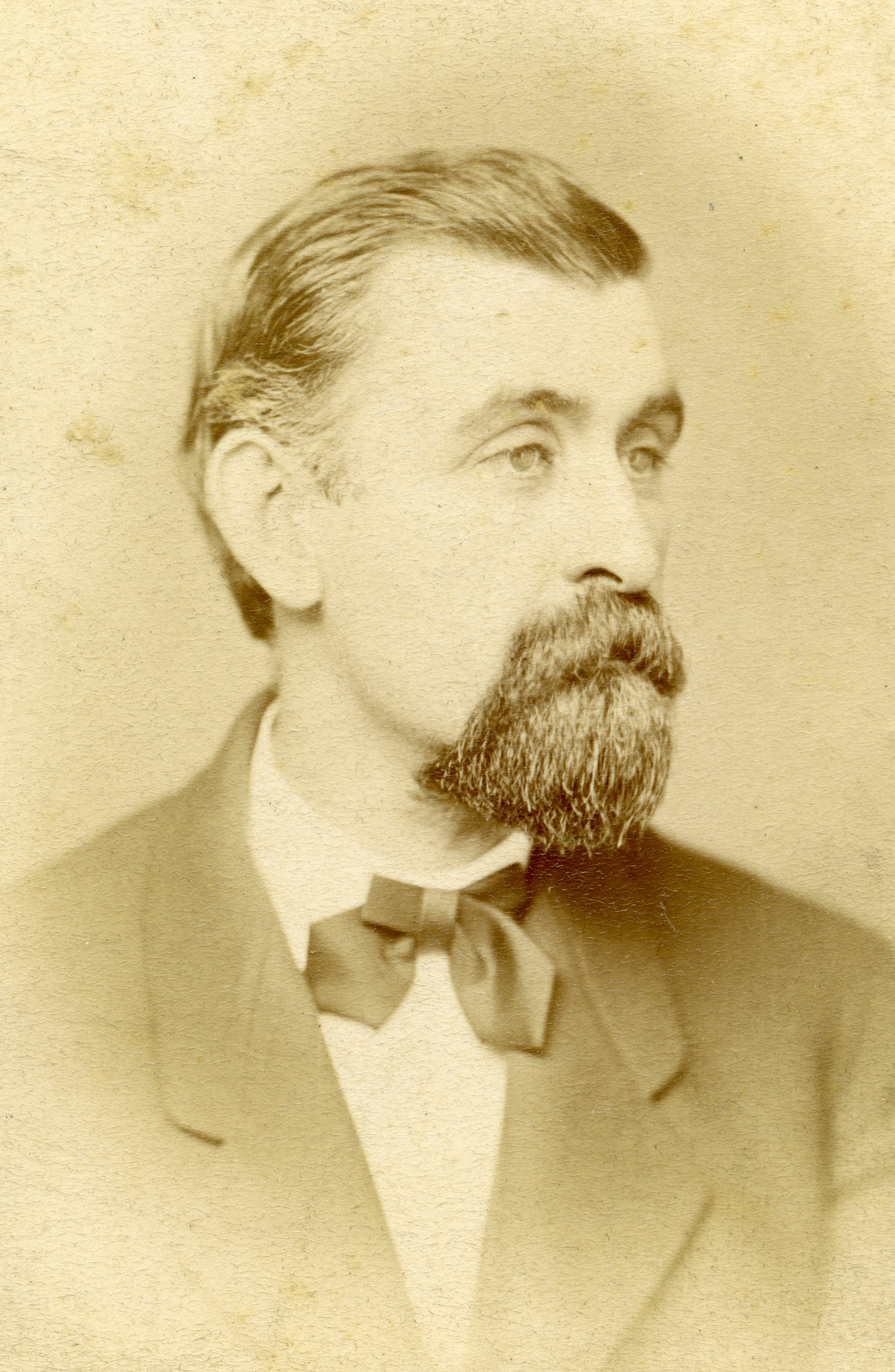
c. 1870

Hoopes was born to parents Pierce and Sarah A. Hoopes in West Chester in 1832. He attended Philadelphia high schools. In 1853, he founded Cherry Hill Nurseries (later Hoopes Brothers & Thomas) in West Chester, which expanded to one thousand acres by 1913 and became one of the largest commercial plant nurseries in the United States. Hoopes supplied fruit trees to all the country's national cemeteries and sold overseas in Europe and Australia. The business formally dissolved in July 1948.

Hoopes was lifelong friends with botanists David Townsend and William Darlington. He wrote for The New York Times, The Horticulturist, Botanical Gazette and other horticultural periodicals and served as founder and president of the Horticultural Association of Pennsylvania for seven years. His Book of Evergreens (1868) was an authoritative treatise on conifers.

Hoopes was a fifth-generation Quaker. He had a colony of purple martins nesting on the grounds of his house. He had a collection of mounted bird specimens, nearly eight thousand of which were acquired by the Philadelphia Academy of Natural Sciences, and served as a trustee of West Chester State Normal School for fifteen years.

The standard author abbreviation Hoopes is used to indicate this person as the author when citing a botanical name.
