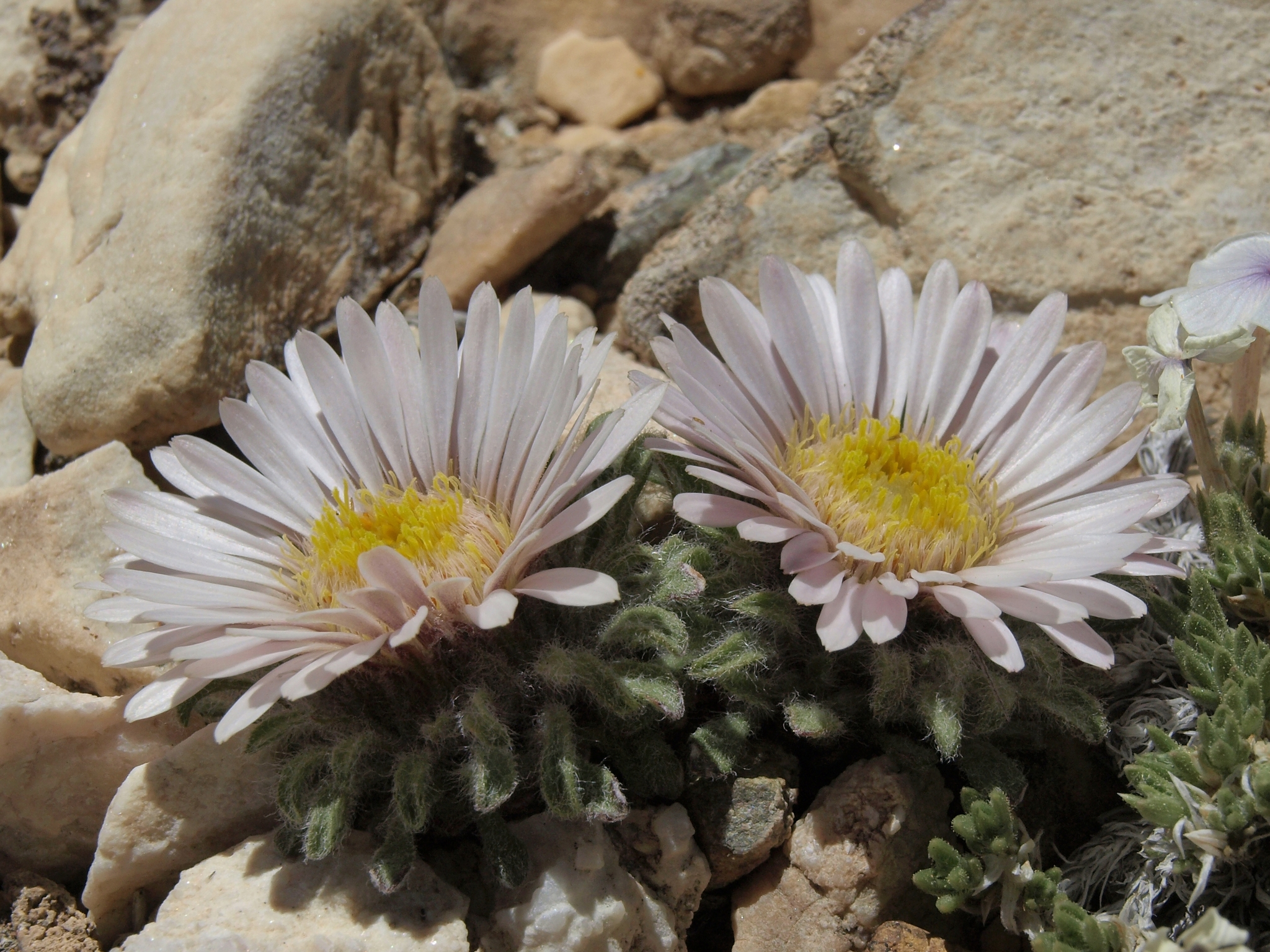

Scientific classification
- Kingdom: Plantae
- Clade: Tracheophytes
- Clade: Angiosperms
- Clade: Eudicots
- Clade: Asterids
- Order: Asterales
- Family: Asteraceae
- Genus: Townsendia
- Species: T. condensata

Binomial name
- Townsendia condensata Parry ex A.Gray

= Townsendia condensata =

Species of flowering plant

Townsendia condensata is a species of flowering plant in the family Asteraceae known by the common names cushion Townsend daisy and cushion townsendia. It is native to North America where it is known from many scattered occurrences in the mountains of the western United States and Alberta in Canada. It is mainly limited to the alpine climates of high mountain peaks, where it grows in meadows, tundra, and barren, rocky talus. It grows alongside other alpine plants such as Eriogonum androsaceum.

This is a petite biennial or perennial herb taking a clumped form just a few centimeters tall, its herbage growing on a caudex and taproot unit. The leaves are 1 or 1.5 centimeters long, rounded, and coated in woolly hairs. The inflorescence is generally a solitary flower head 1 to 3 centimeters wide with rough-haired, lance-shaped phyllaries. The head contains many yellow disc florets and many white, pinkish, or purplish ray florets each measuring up to 16 millimeters in length. The fruit is a hairy achene tipped with a deciduous pappus of bristles.

One variety of this species, var. anomala, the North Fork Easter-daisy, is endemic to the Absaroka Mountains of Wyoming, mostly in the drainage of the North Fork of the Shoshone River.
