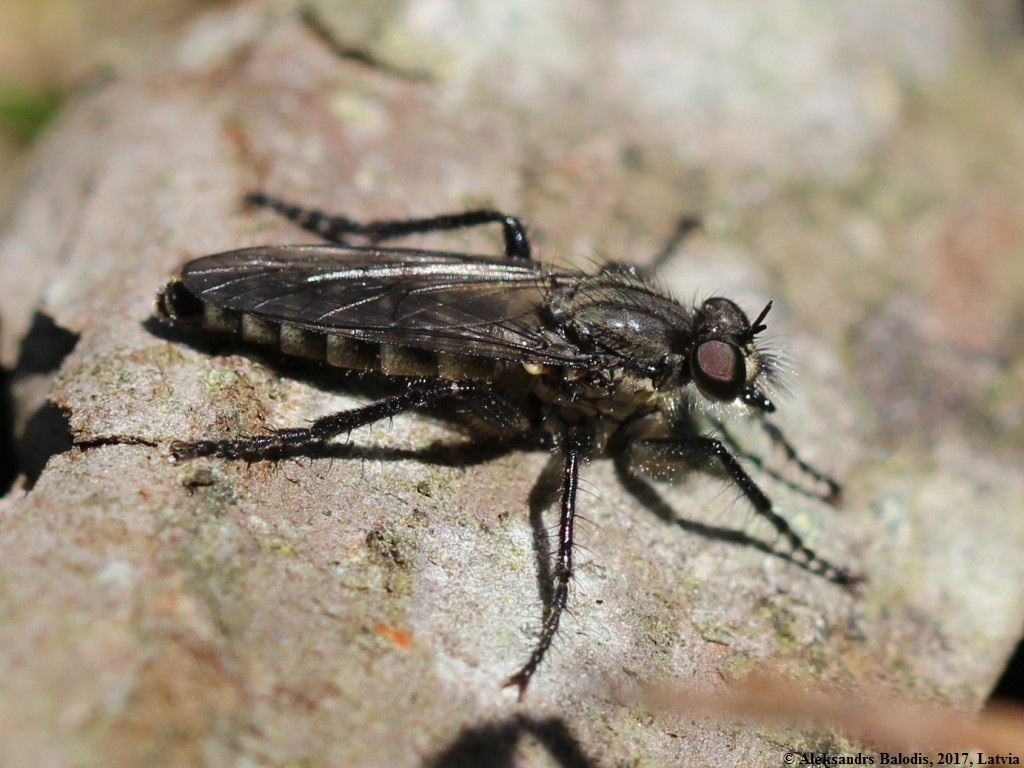
- Lasiopogon cinctus

Scientific classification
- Domain: Eukaryota
- Kingdom: Animalia
- Phylum: Arthropoda
- Class: Insecta
- Order: Diptera
- Family: Asilidae
- Subfamily: Stichopogoninae

= Stichopogoninae =

Subfamily of flies

Stichopogoninae is a subfamily of robber flies in the family Asilidae. There are about 14 genera and at least 230 described species in Stichopogoninae.

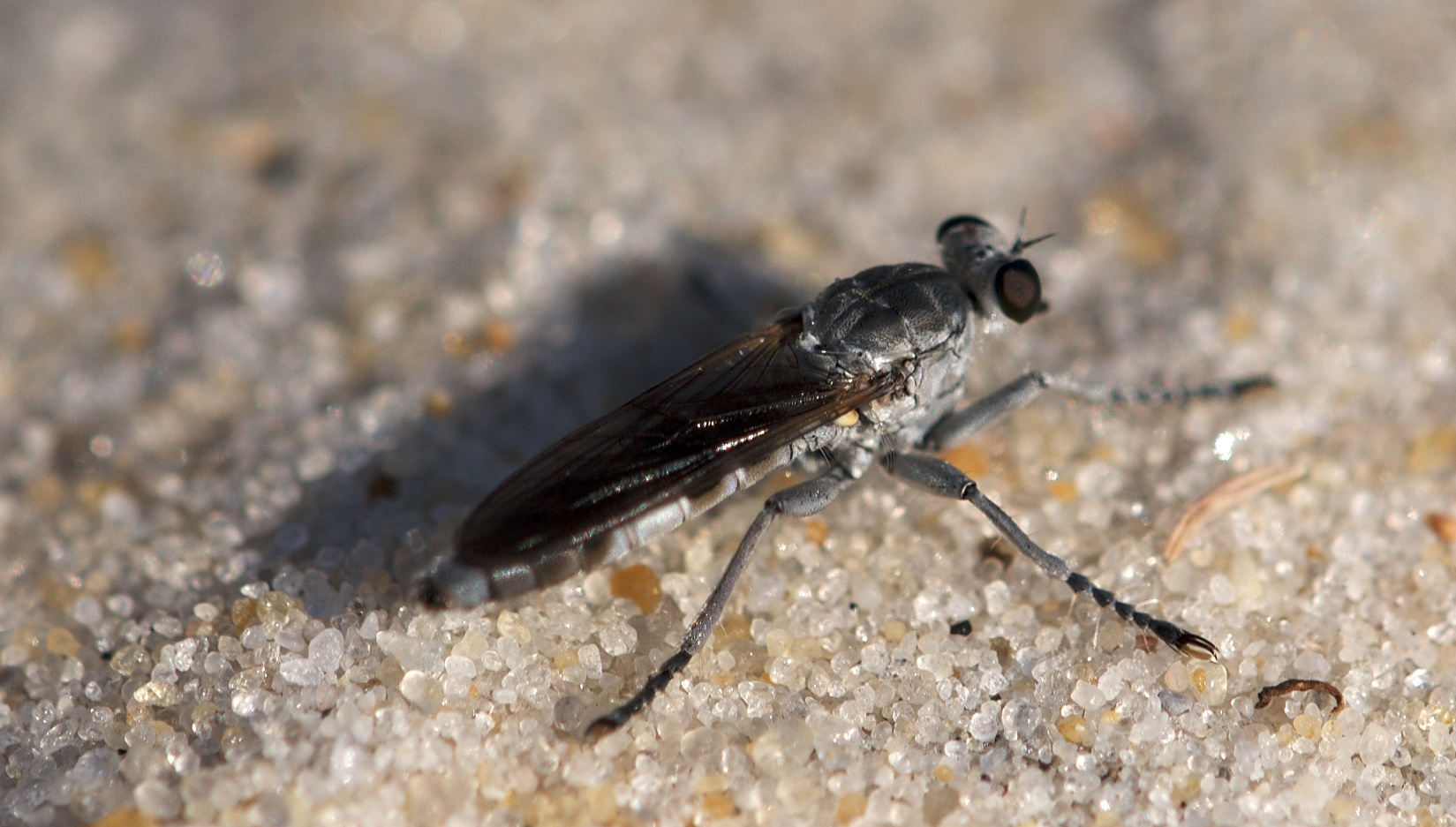
Stichopogon trifasciatus

== Genera ==
These 14 genera belong to the subfamily Stichopogoninae:

- Afganopogon Hradsky, 1962
- Argyropogon Artigas and Papavero, 1990
- Clinopogon Bezzi, 1910
- Dichropogon Bezzi, 1910
- Eremodromus Zimin, 1928
- Lasiopogon Loew, 1847
- Lissoteles Bezzi, 1910
- Nanoculcita Londt and Copeland, 2017
- Rhadinus Loew, 1856
- Stackelberginia Lehr, 1964
- Stichopogon Loew, 1847
- Townsendia Williston, 1895
- Turkmenomyia Paramonov, 1930
- † Burmapogon Dikow and Grimaldi, 2014
