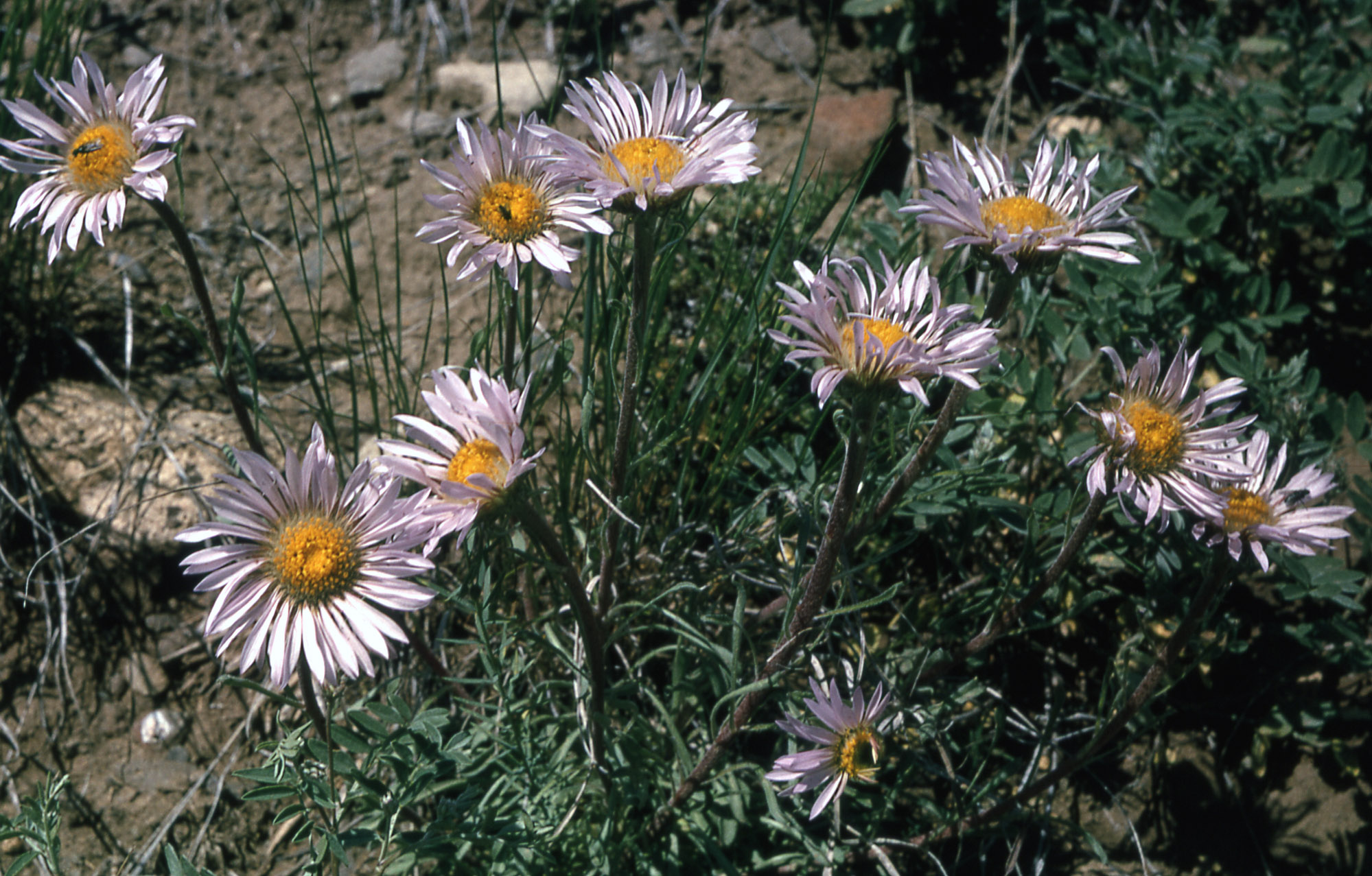
- Townsendia parryi

Scientific classification
- Kingdom: Plantae
- Clade: Tracheophytes
- Clade: Angiosperms
- Clade: Eudicots
- Clade: Asterids
- Order: Asterales
- Family: Asteraceae
- Subfamily: Asteroideae
- Tribe: Astereae
- Subtribe: Astranthiinae
- Genus: Townsendia; Hook.

Type species
- Townsendia sericea (syn of T. exscapa) Hook.

= Townsendia (plant) =

Townsend daisies

Genus of plants

Townsendia is a genus of North American plants in the tribe Astereae within the family Asteraceae.

The genus is known commonly as Townsend daisies or as grounddaisies. These annual, biennial and perennial wildflowers are native to western North America, frequently at high elevations. A number of taxa are tall, erect plants, like typical daisies. Others form small, dense, leafy rosettes, or have a more sprawling, prostrate appearance. Frequently, the flower heads are showy and attractive, with the ray florets in shades of pink, purple, blue, white, and, rarely, yellow.

The genus name honors Pennsylvania botanist David Townsend (1787–1858).

Species

- Townsendia alpigena - Wyoming Townsend daisy - WY
- Townsendia annua - annual Townsend daisy - AZ UT CO NM TX
- Townsendia aprica - Last Chance Townsend daisy - UT
- Townsendia condensata - cushion Townsend daisy - UT CA WY ID MT ALB
- Townsendia eximia - NM CO
- Townsendia exscapa - stemless Townsend daisy - BC ALB SAS MAN IDMT ND SD NE WY CO KS OK TX NM AZ NV UT
- Townsendia fendleri - AZ NM CO
- Townsendia florifera - showy Townsend daisy - WA OR NV IDMT WY
- Townsendia formosa - AZ NM Chihuahua
- Townsendia glabella - CO
- Townsendia grandiflora - SD NE WY CO NM
- Townsendia gypsophila - gypsum-loving Townsend daisy - NM
- Townsendia hookeri - BC ALB SAS MT IDWY CO UT ND SD NE
- Townsendia incana - hoary Townsend daisy - AZ NM NV UT CO WY MT
- Townsendia jonesii - AZ NV UT
- Townsendia leptotes - common Townsend daisy - CA AZ NM NV UT CO WY MT ID
- Townsendia mensana - UT
- Townsendia mexicana - Coahuila, Nuevo León, Hidalgo, México State, Zacatecas
- Townsendia microcephala - WY
- Townsendia montana - MT ID OR WY UT CO
- Townsendia nuttalli - Nuttall's Townsend daisy - WY
- Townsendia parryi - Parry's Townsend daisy - BC ALB MT ID WY OR NV
- Townsendia rothrockii - Rothrock's Townsend daisy - CO
- Townsendia scapigera - tufted Townsend daisy - CA NV UT ID OR
- Townsendia smithii - Black Rock Townsend daisy - AZ
- Townsendia spathulata - sword Townsend daisy - MT WY
- Townsendia strigosa - NM AZ UT CO WY
- Townsendia texensis - Texas Townsend daisy - OK TX

formerly included

see Xylorhiza

- Townsendia wrightii - Xylorhiza wrightii
