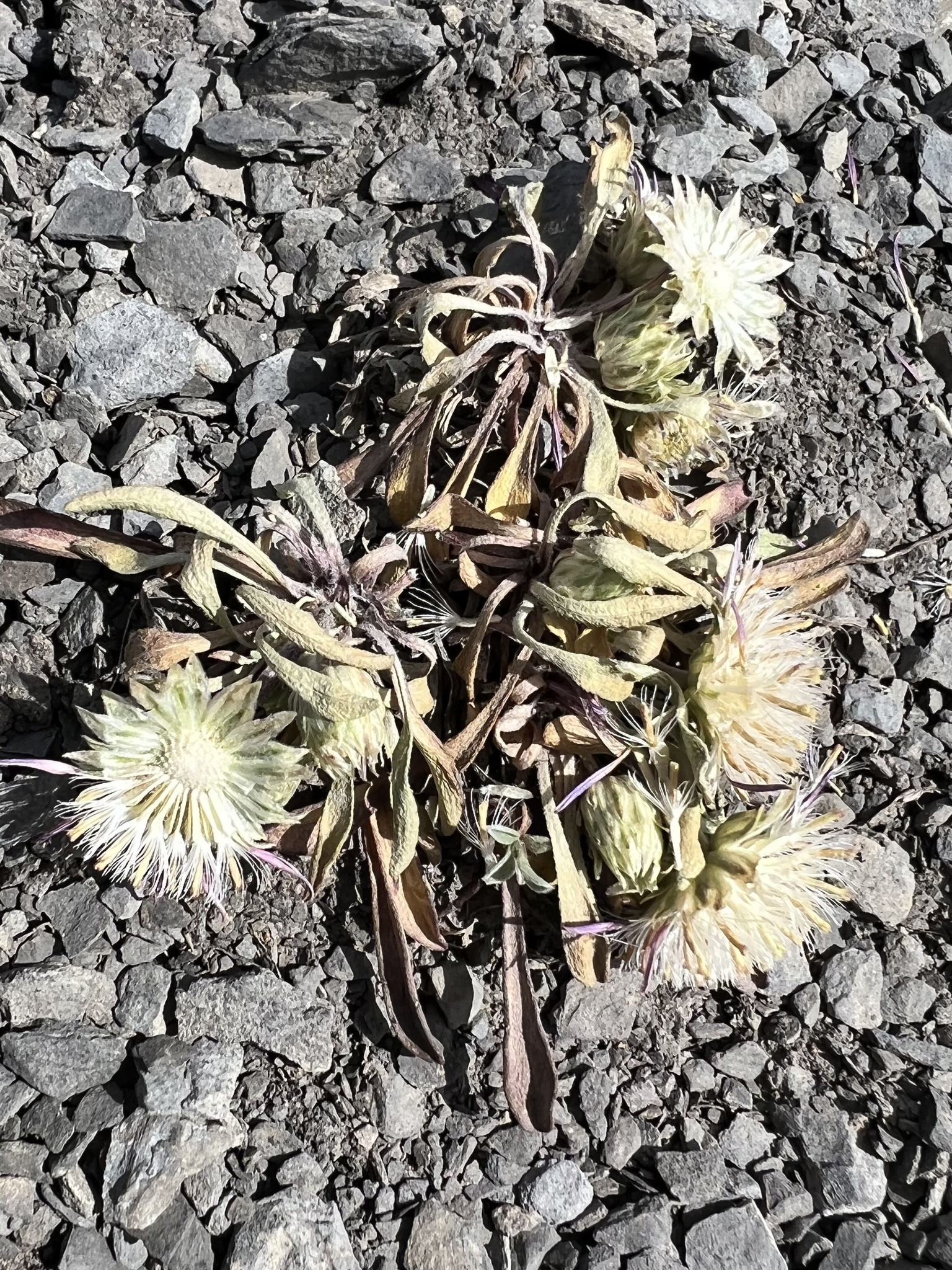
- Townsendia rothrockii

Scientific classification
- Domain: Eukaryota
- Kingdom: Animalia
- Phylum: Arthropoda
- Class: Insecta
- Order: Diptera
- Family: Asilidae
- Subfamily: Stichopogoninae
- Genus: Townsendia; Williston, 1895

= Townsendia (fly) =

Genus of flies

Townsendia is a genus of robber flies in the family Asilidae. There are about 13 described species in Townsendia.

== Species ==
These 13 species belong to the genus Townsendia:

- Townsendia albomacula Martin, 1966^{i c g b}
- Townsendia araguensis Kaletta, 1976^{c g}
- Townsendia arenicola Scarbrough, 1995^{c g b}
- Townsendia argyrata Curran, 1926^{c g}
- Townsendia dilata Martin, 1966^{i c g}
- Townsendia fiebrigii Bezzi, 1909^{c g}
- Townsendia gracilis Martin, 1966^{c g}
- Townsendia minuta Williston, 1895^{i c g}
- Townsendia nemacula Martin, 1966^{c g}
- Townsendia nigra Back, 1909^{i c g b}
- Townsendia podexargenteus Enderlein, 1914^{c g}
- Townsendia pulcherrima Back, 1909^{i c g}
- Townsendia triangulata Martin, 1966^{c g}

Data sources: i = ITIS, c = Catalogue of Life, g = GBIF, b = Bugguide.net
