= David Townsend (botanist) =

American botanist and banker (1787–1858)

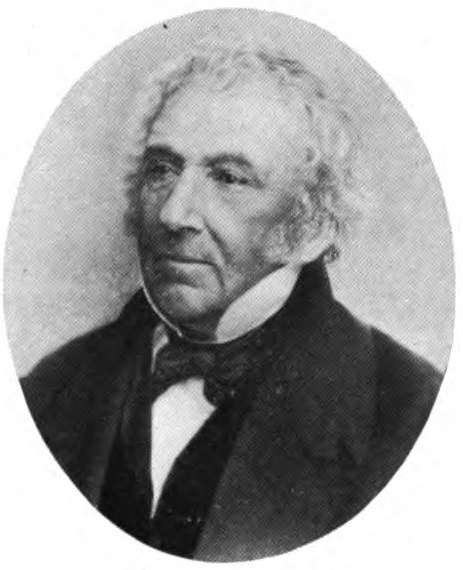
- Townsend in a 1914 publication
- Born: December 13, 1787; Pughtown, Pennsylvania, U.S.
- Died: December 6, 1858 (aged 70); West Chester, Pennsylvania, U.S.
- Resting place: Oaklands Cemetery
- Occupations: Botanist, banker, civic leader
- Known for: Plant genus Townsendia
- Spouse: Rebecca Sharpless (m. 1812; died 1836)
- Children: 7, including Washington

David Townsend (December 13, 1787 – December 6, 1858) was an American banker, botanist, and civic leader from Chester County, Pennsylvania. He was a lifelong friend and business associate of noted botanist William Darlington and was a founder and chief cashier of the National Bank of Chester County. The plant genus Townsendia was named in his honor.

== Biography ==
Townsend was born in the village of Pughtown, Chester County, Pennsylvania, to Quaker farmers Samuel and Priscilla Yarnell Townsend. He studied elementary math and English at a local country school and became a clerk in the office of the Register and Recorder of Chester County in 1810. He moved to West Chester that year and lived in the borough until his death.

He was elected as a commissioner of Chester County in 1813 and became county treasurer in 1816. In 1814, he became a founding director of the National Bank of Chester County, where he held the position of chief cashier from 1817 to 1849. His friend William Darlington served as the long-time president of the bank. Townsend helped oversee the construction of a new bank building between 1835 and 1837. In addition, Townsend became a trustee of West Chester Academy in 1821 and board treasurer and financier from 1826 to 1854. For two weeks in 1827, he served as prothonotary of Chester County. He resigned from the bank after suffering an accidental head injury, which eventually disabled him and caused his death.

Townsend married distant cousin Rebecca Sharpless on April 16, 1812 at the Birmingham Friends Meetinghouse. She was born on June 9, 1789, and died on July 22, 1836. She was the daughter of William and Ann (Hunt) Sharpless. The Townsend couple had seven children: Washington, Benjamin Franklin, Priscilla Ann (who died in childhood), Gulielma Maria, Albert, Anna Eliza, and S. Sharpless. Their eldest son, Washington Townsend, would serve as a U.S. Representative from 1869 to 1877.

Townsend died at his West Chester home on December 6, 1858. His remains were interred at Oaklands Cemetery in West Goshen Township, Pennsylvania.

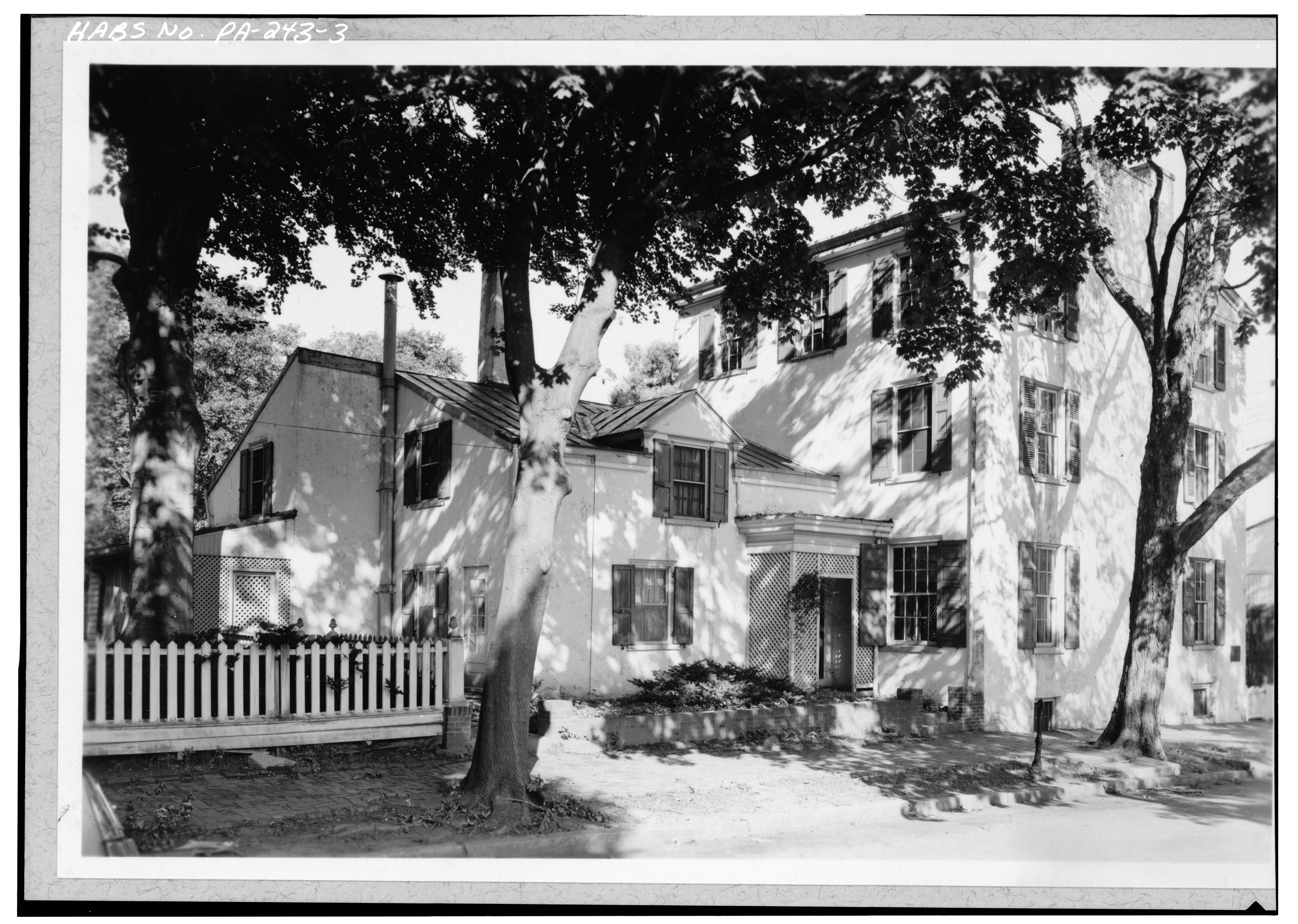
The Townsend House on 225 North Matlack Street, West Chester, PA

== Botany ==
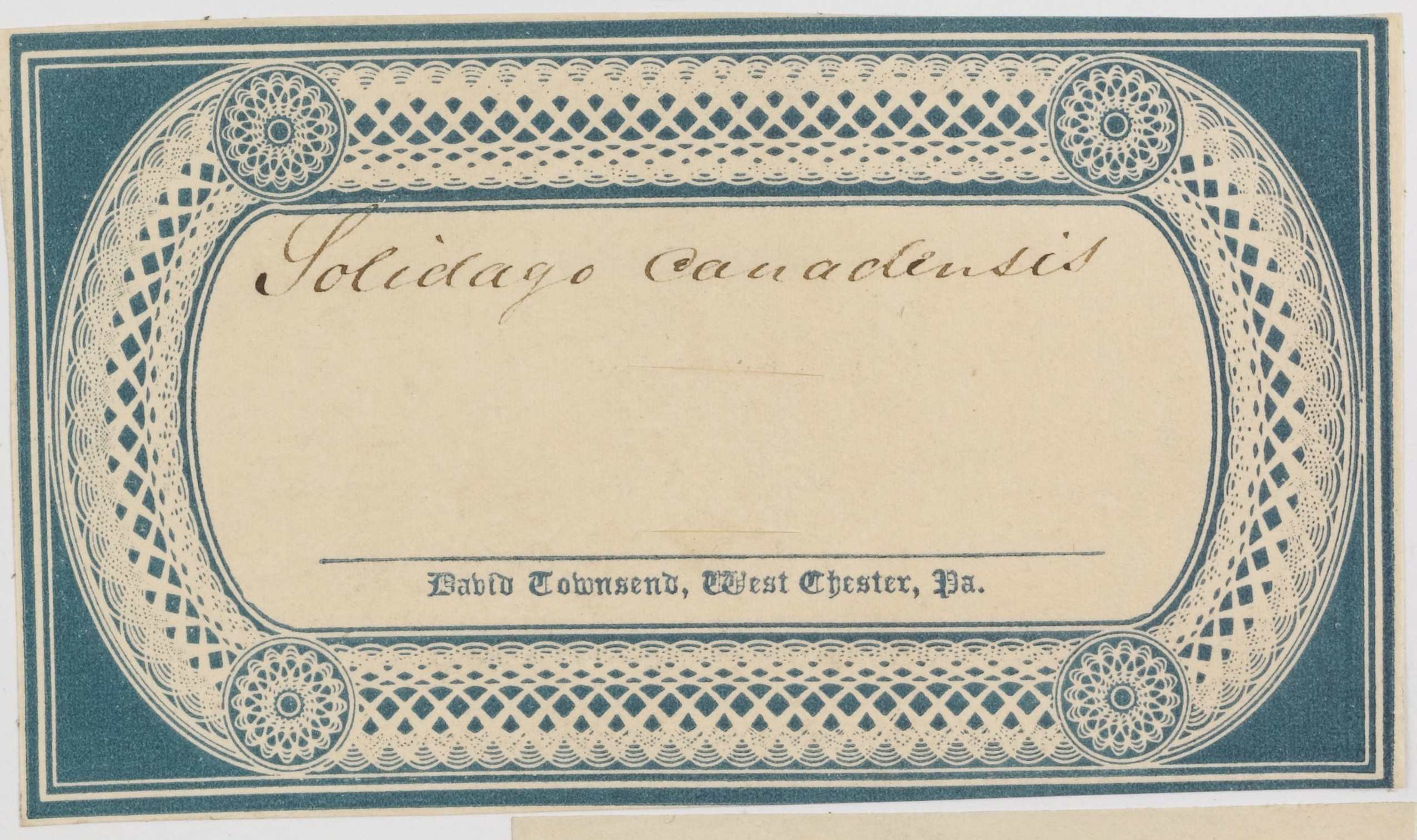
Label for specimen collected by David Townsend at the National Herbarium of Victoria, Royal Botanic Gardens Victoria, MEL 2415316.

Townsend was a prominent amateur botanist and lifelong friend and business associate of William Darlington and belonged to a social circle of botanists in Chester County, notably Josiah Hoopes as well as his friend Darlington. Townsend corresponded with other botanists across America and Europe, including John Torrey, Francis Boott, and William Jackson Hooker, who named a genus of flowering plants related to the asters Townsendia in his honor. Hooker first described this genus in his 1834 book Flora Boreali-Americana. Hooker praised Townsend's specimens (collected locally or obtained from European colleagues) as among the "handsomest" that he had ever seen. Besides collecting plants, Townsend maintained extensive gardens at his home at 225 North Matlack Street in West Chester, planting many uncommon species of fruits and ornamentals. When he resigned, the bank directors presented him with a token of their esteem: a pair of silver pitchers with engraved representations of Townsendia.

In 1826, Townsend co-founded the Chester County Cabinet of Natural Sciences and served as the association's treasurer and secretary until his health failed. The Cabinet merged with the West Chester Academy in 1871, with sale of stock and the assets of both institutions financing the formation of the West Chester Normal School, which became West Chester University. The school received Townsend's collection of plant specimens after his death, along with Darlington's and Hoopes'. Cared for as part of the University library's special collection, and today it is called the Darlington Herbarium (Index Herbariorum code DWC).

Other herbaria also have specimens from Townsend's collection, include the National Herbarium of Victoria, Royal Botanic Gardens Victoria, the herbarium of the Academy of Natural Sciences of Drexel University, and the Shirley C. Tucker Herbarium at Louisiana State University. The specimens he collected often feature a label in red or blue, with an elaborate lacy border.
