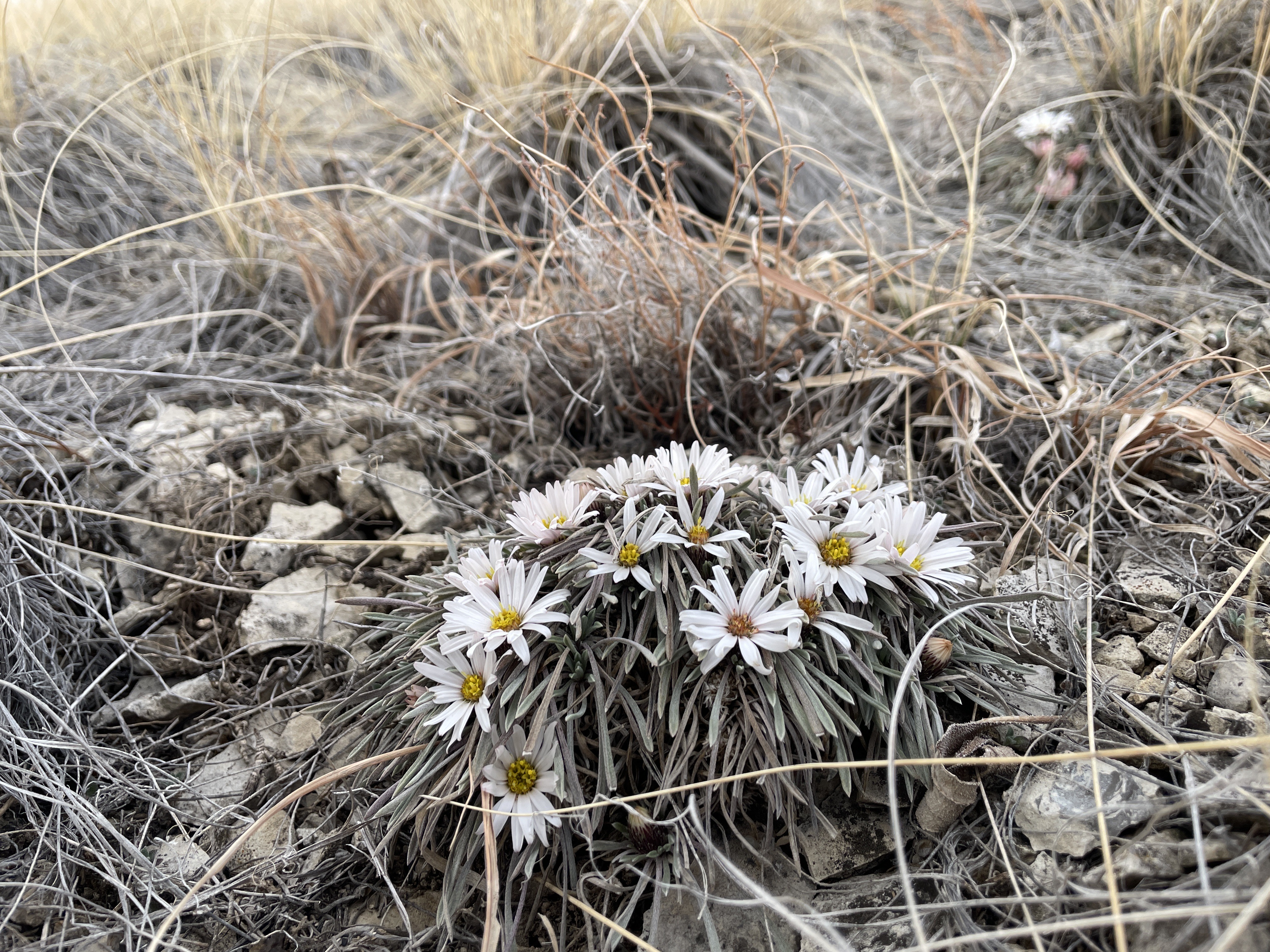
- A blooming mat of Townsendia hookeri growing on a gravel slope

Conservation status
- Secure (NatureServe)

Scientific classification
- Kingdom: Plantae
- Clade: Tracheophytes
- Clade: Angiosperms
- Clade: Eudicots
- Clade: Asterids
- Order: Asterales
- Family: Asteraceae
- Genus: Townsendia
- Species: T. hookeri

Binomial name
- Townsendia hookeri Beaman

Synonyms
- Townsendia nuttallii Dorn

= Townsendia hookeri =

Species of flowerering plant

Townsendia hookeri is a perennial flowering plant in the family Asteraceae. It is often referred to by the common names Easter daisy or Hooker's Townsend daisy.

== Description ==
The more noticeable morphological features of T. hookeri include the growth of linear, strigose leaves, and the early-spring formation of sessile or "stemless" flowers which are most often cream to faintly pink. With maturity, the plant can become mat-forming. Although members of the genus Townsendia can be notoriously challenging to key, there are a few tell-tale features that distinguish T. hookeri from its look-a-like T. exscapa. The bracts of T. hookeri terminate in tiny tufts of hair, whereas the bracts of T. exscapa do not. Additionally, the disk pappus of T. hookeri just barely extends beyond the disk petals, while in the case of T. exscapa, the disk pappus greatly exceeds the petals. A hand lens is often needed to accurately key these species.

== Taxonomy ==
Named after 19th-century botanist William Jackson Hooker, T. hookeri shares the genus Townsendia with at least 28 other species.

== Distribution and habitat ==
Townsendia hookeri is native to North America, primarily along the Rocky Mountain corridor. Within the United States, its known native range includes the states: Alaska, Idaho, Montana, Wyoming, North and South Dakota, Nebraska, Colorado, and Utah. It can also be found in the Canadian provinces Yukon, British Columbia, Alberta, and Saskatchewan.

It is most commonly found growing on well-draining talus slopes, gravel, and exposures, including disturbances such as road cuts.
