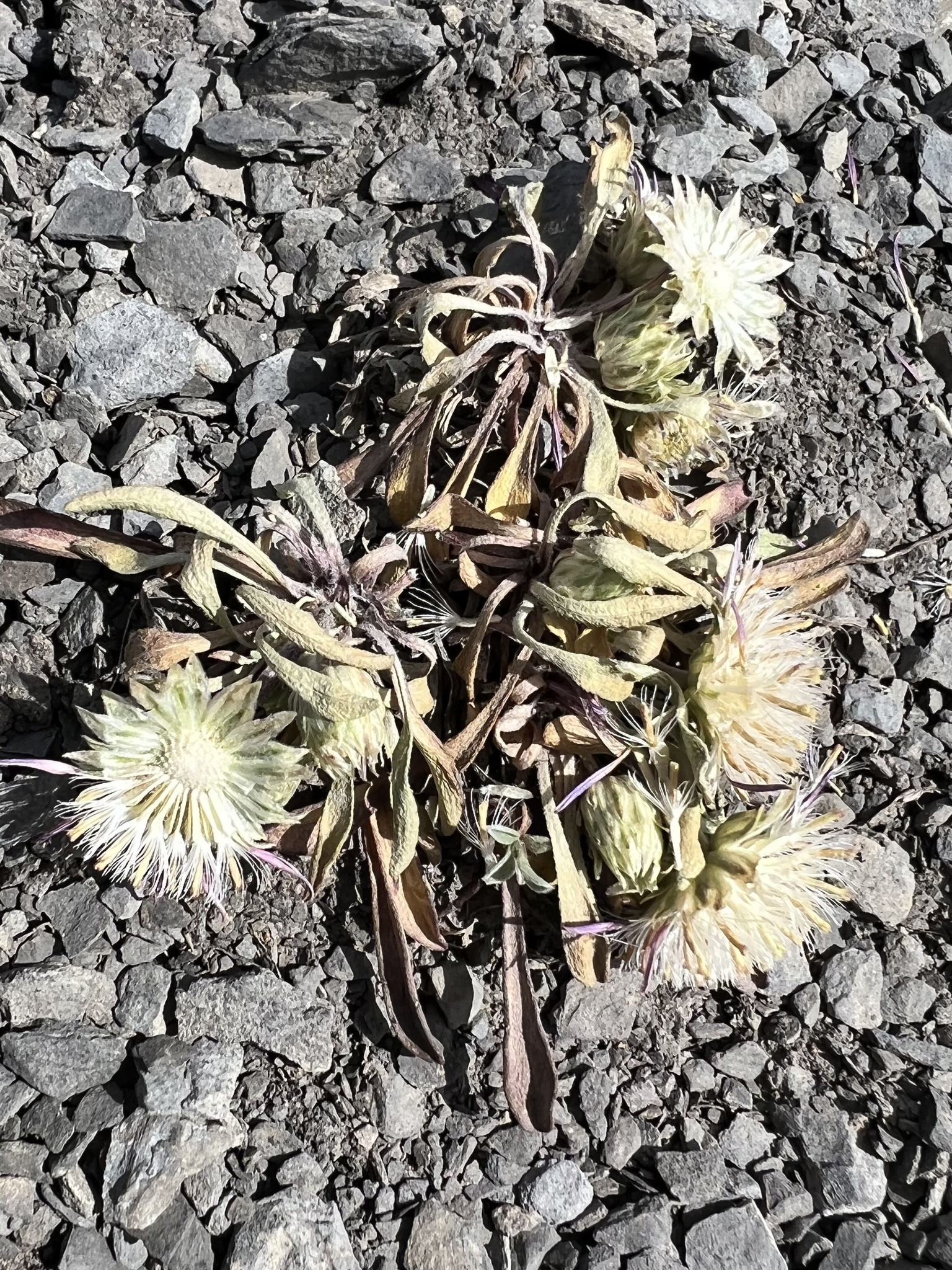

Conservation status
- Vulnerable (NatureServe)

Scientific classification
- Kingdom: Plantae
- Clade: Tracheophytes
- Clade: Angiosperms
- Clade: Eudicots
- Clade: Asterids
- Order: Asterales
- Family: Asteraceae
- Genus: Townsendia
- Species: T. rothrockii

Binomial name
- Townsendia rothrockii A.Gray ex Rothr.

= Townsendia rothrockii =

Species of flowering plant

Townsendia rothrockii is a species of flowering plant in the family Asteraceae known by the common name Rothrock's Townsend daisy. It is endemic to Colorado in the United States, where there are 35 occurrences across thirteen counties. Reports of the plant from New Mexico are false.

This plant is a small perennial herb forming a dense rosette of thick leaves up to 3.5 centimeters long. It grows from a taproot and caudex. The flower heads are cup-shaped and up to 2.8 centimeters wide. The ray florets are blue to lilac in color and measure up to 1.6 centimeters in length. The center of the head contains yellow disc florets.

This plant grows in high-elevation habitat in the mountains of southwestern Colorado. It can be found in a number of habitat types in montane, subalpine and alpine climates, including fellfields, talus, meadows, ridges, passes, rock outcrops, and disturbed areas. Species associated with the plant include Abies lasiocarpa, Agrostis thurberiana, Anemone multifida, Draba nivalis var. exigua, Eritrichium aretioides, Festuca thurberi, Oreoxis alpina, Pinus ponderosa, Polemonium viscosum, Rydbergia grandiflora, Trifolium dasyphyllum, Trifolium nanum, and Valeriana capitata.
