= Margaret Butler =

Margaret Butler may refer to:

- Lady Margaret Butler (died 1539), Irish noblewoman
- Margaret F. Butler (1861–1931), American physician and professor
- Margaret FitzGerald, Countess of Ormond (died 1542), Irish noblewoman with the married name Butler
- Margaret K. Butler (1924–2013), American mathematician who specialized in early computer software
- Margaret Butler (sculptor) (1883–1947), New Zealand sculptor
