= Lukens Pierce House =

Historic house in Pennsylvania, United States

- U.S. National Register of Historic Places
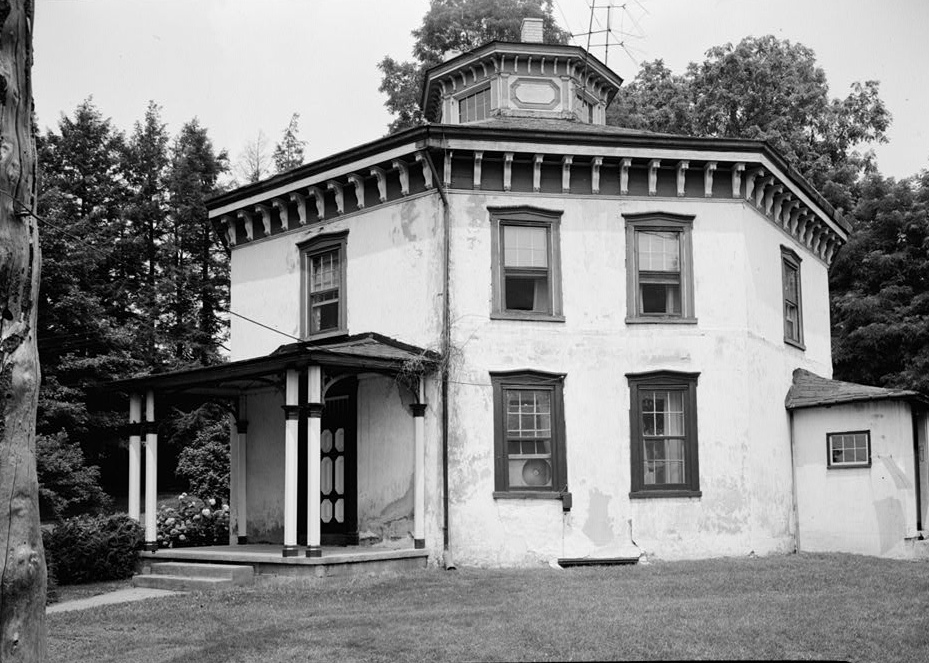

- Location within Pennsylvania Location within the United States
- Nearest city: NW of Ercildoun on Wilmington Rd., Ercildoun, Pennsylvania
- Coordinates: 39°57′9″N 75°51′0″W
- Built: 1856
- Architectural style: Octagon Mode
- NRHP reference No.: 73001604
- Added to NRHP: March 14, 1973

The Lukens Pierce House, also known as the Fallowfield Octagonal House. is an historic octagon house which is located northwest of Ercildoun on Wilmington Road in East Fallowfield Township, Chester County, Pennsylvania.

It was added to the National Register of Historic Places on March 14, 1973.

== History and architectural features ==
This building was constructed of stuccoed fieldstone and has a cupola. There are four large rectangular rooms and four smaller triangular rooms on each floor.
