= Ercildoun, Pennsylvania =

Unincorporated community in Pennsylvania, U.S.

- Ercildoun Historic District
- U.S. National Register of Historic Places
- U.S. Historic district
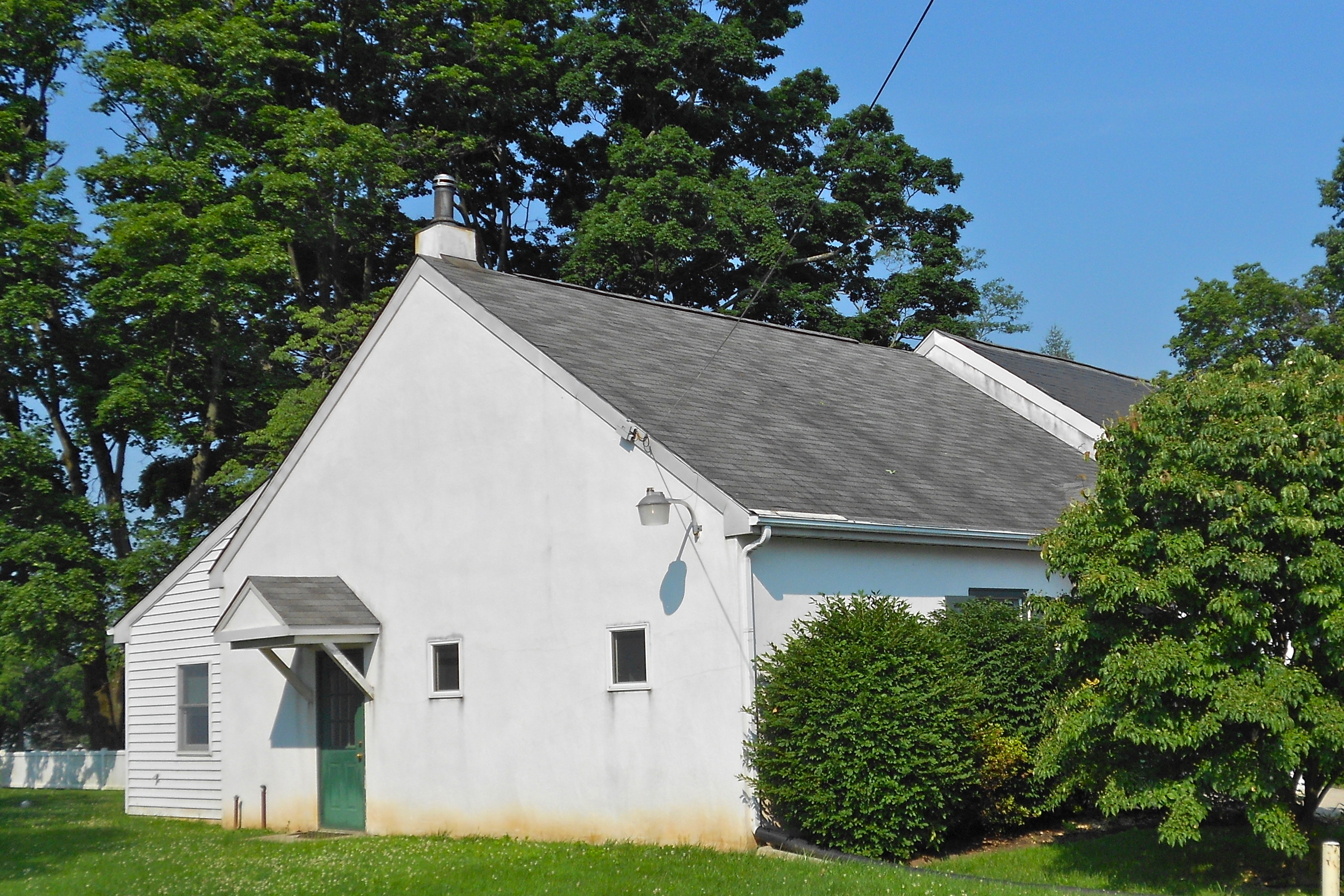
- Fallowfields Meetinghouse, built 1811

- Location within Pennsylvania Location within the United States
- Nearest city: Coatesville, Pennsylvania
- Coordinates: 39°56′35″N 75°50′31″W
- Area: 43 acres (17 ha)
- MPS: East Fallowfield Township MRA
- NRHP reference No.: 85001157
- Added to NRHP: May 20, 1985

Ercildoun
- Unincorporated community
- Interactive map of Ercildoun
- Country: United States
- State: Pennsylvania
- County: Chester
- Township: East Fallowfield
- Time zone: UTC-5 (Eastern (EST))
  - Summer (DST): UTC-4 (EDT)
- ZIP codes: 19320 (Coatesville)

Ercildoun, population about 100, is an unincorporated community in East Fallowfield Township, Chester County, Pennsylvania, United States. The hamlet was founded by Quakers and was an early center of the abolitionist movement. In 1985 the entire hamlet, including 31 properties, was listed as a historic district on the National Register of Historic Places. Of these properties two were vacant land, 14 were significant buildings, ten were contributing buildings, and five buildings, built in the 1950s, were non-contributing. The Lukens Pierce House, an octagon house listed separately on the U.S. National Register of Historic Places, is located about half a mile northwest of the hamlet. Ercildoun is one of about ten hamlets in the township, which has no cities or towns, but has 31 sites listed on the National Register. It is one of the larger hamlets, located near the center of the township, and historically among the best known. The city of Coatesville is about 3 miles north.

The name "Ercildoun" was taken from the poem, "Thomas the Rhymer" by Sir Walter Scott when the hamlet's post office opened in 1850, but it was misspelled "Ercildown" until 1854. The main character in the poem was Thomas of Ercildoun, from Ercildoune, Scotland.

== History ==
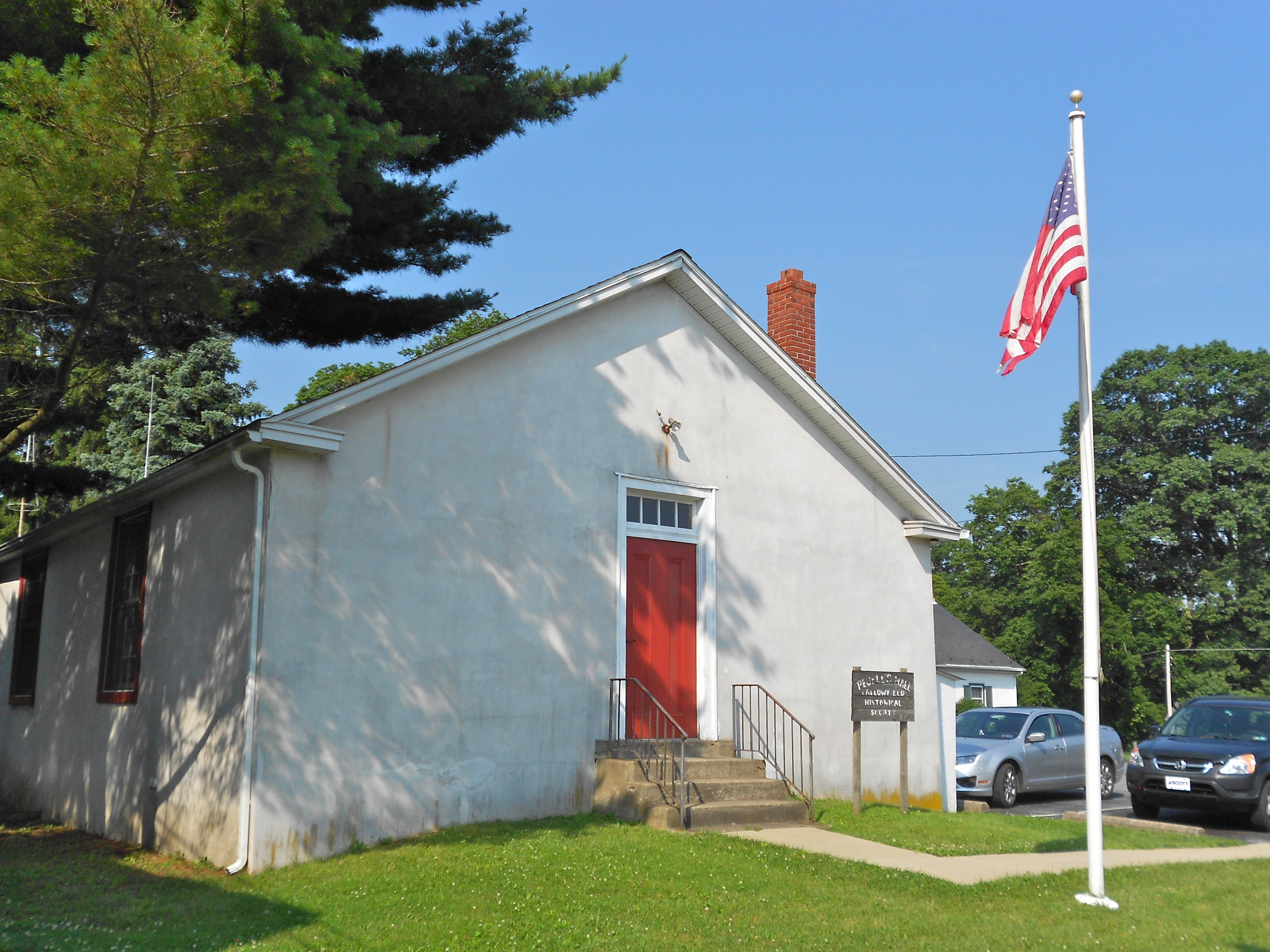
People's Hall "One old building still stands As a tribute to voices now stilled It stands as a monument to Old "Friends" Who dared to do right."

Land in the current hamlet was first settled by Quaker farmers in the final years of the eighteenth century. In 1811 the current Fallowfields Friends Meeting House was built, which, with the adjoining cemetery, People's Hall, and the former post office - now a grocery store, forms the center of town. Arising from Quaker beliefs, the abolitionist East Fallowfield Anti-Slavery Society was formed in 1835 with James Fulton Jr. as the recording secretary, and 33 other members. Fulton became active as an officer of the county and state anti-slavery societies and attended national meetings on abolition. In its first annual report the Society stated that they had distributed 3,000 books and tracts and gathered signatures petitioning Congress to abolish slavery in the District of Columbia and the territories.

The Anti-Slavery Society met in the Fallowfield Meetinghouse until the winter of 1844, when Abby Kelley and Charles Burleigh spoke at a meeting that was broken up by a mob of anti-abolitionists. About this time abolitionist halls were burned down in Philadelphia and Lancaster, both less than 40 miles away. The Quaker Meeting membership then banned the Anti-Slavery group from its meetinghouse. In 1845 an association of abolitionists purchased the land and built a hall next to the Meetinghouse, which they called the Free Hall and later the People's Hall. The group declared that "every question, creed, or race was welcome on our platform," and above the platform was the motto "Let Truth and Error grapple." According to resident Gertrude W. Nields, one Quaker who had been supporting the group, withdrew his support on seeing the motto, considering it "inconsistent in Friends to grapple with anything - even error."

Ercildoun became known as center of the Underground Railroad with groups as large as 33 escaped slaves passing through town. Ercildoun's location about 15 miles north of the slave state of Maryland contributed to this activity, and the hamlet fed both the northern and southern Pennsylvania branches of the Underground Railroad both before and during the Civil War. Gideon Pierce and James Fulton, Jr. were among the best known local conductors of the Underground Railroad. Escaped slave Jacob Carter and his brothers Joseph and Richard passed through during their escape. Jacob later bought land and began his ministry in the hamlet.

After the Civil War, former slaves settled in the hamlet and People's Hall served as a grange, church, library, town hall and housed the Fallowfield Historical Society. Over the years the hall suffered from deferred maintenance and in 2015 it was named to Preservation Pennsylvania's list of endangered historic sites. The hall is managed by a Board of Trustees, but historically the trustee positions were inherited, the number of active trustees decreased and resources for upkeep dwindled. The board has been reconstituted, is organizing fund raising, and is starting to restore the People's Hall.

Gideon Pierce built a store on across from the Friends Meeting House in 1818. The Webster family bought the store in 1863 and operated it until 1987. The store still stands and remains active today as Triple Fresh Market. The name "Ercildoun" was first used by Pierce when his store housed the village's post office in 1850.

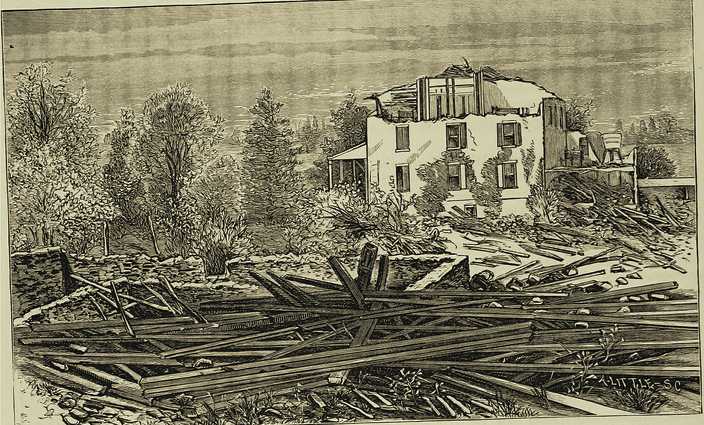
Destruction at Ercildoun Seminary after the 1877 tornado.

The July 1877 "Ercildoun Tornado" was so violent that it was the subject of a lecture at the French Academy of Sciences in 1878. Fourteen buildings were destroyed.

In 1894 an African-American congregation built the Christ Disciple Church.

== Gallery ==
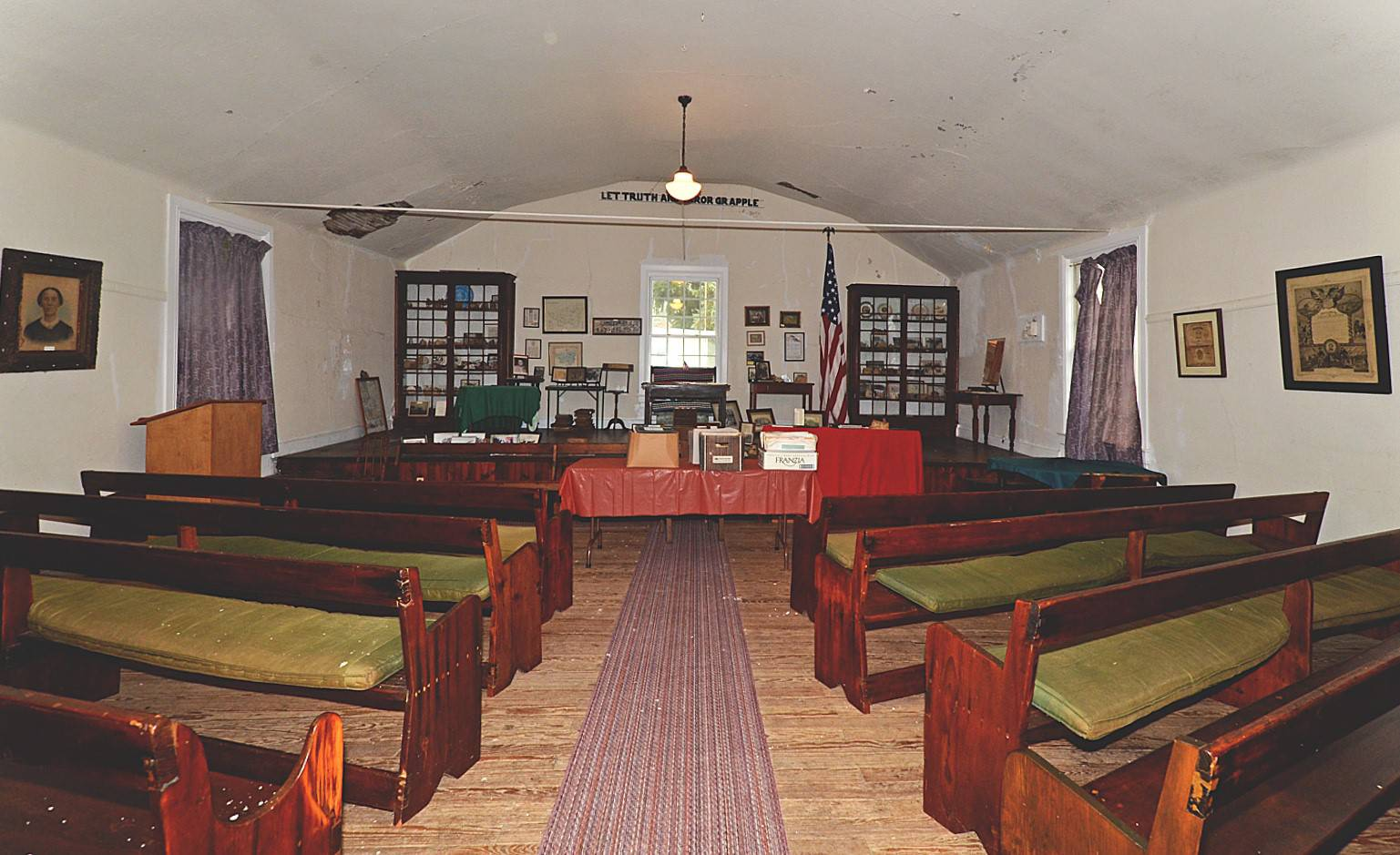
Interior of the People's Hall, note the motto "Let Truth and Error Grapple" on the arch above the stage

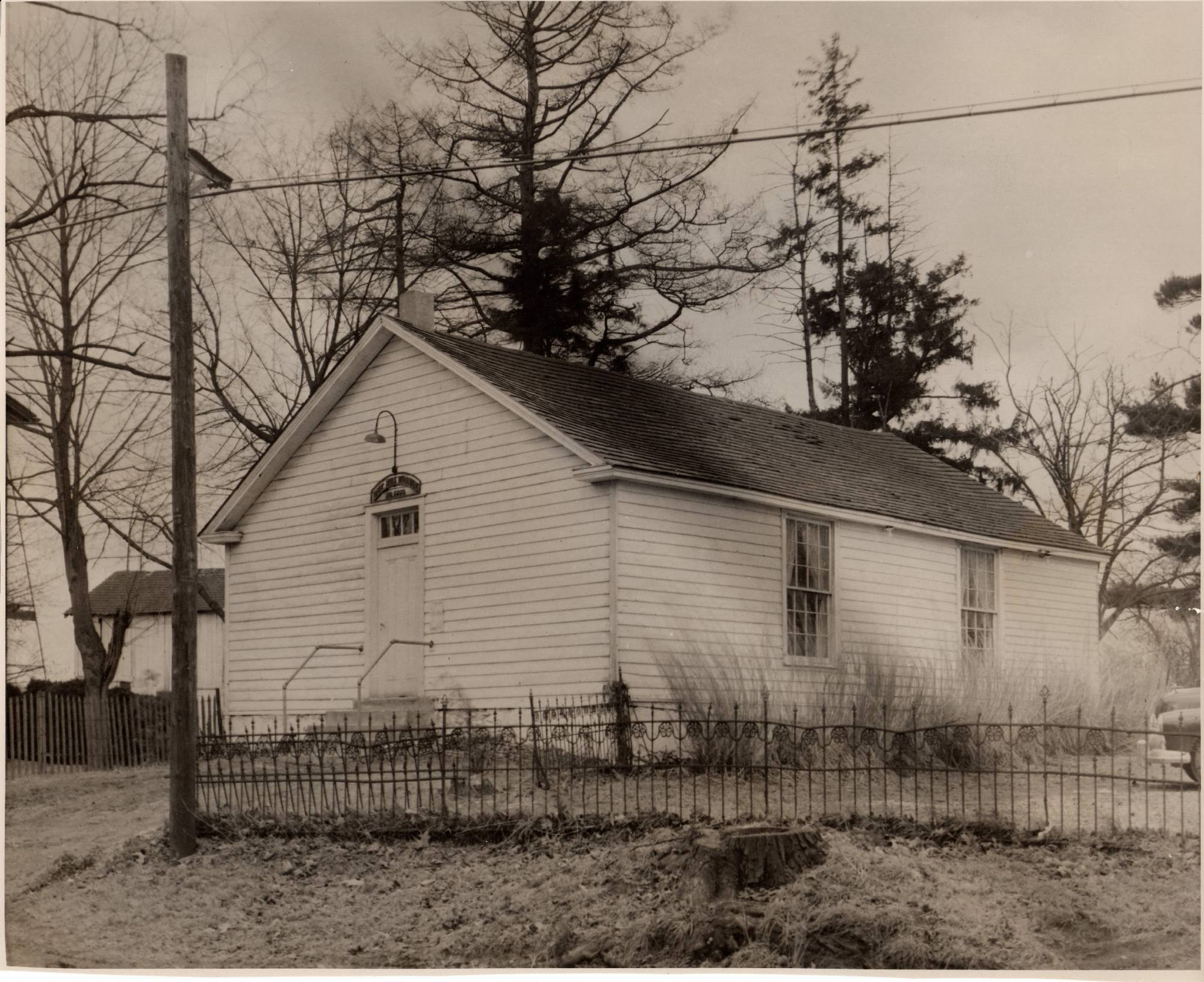
People's hall exterior

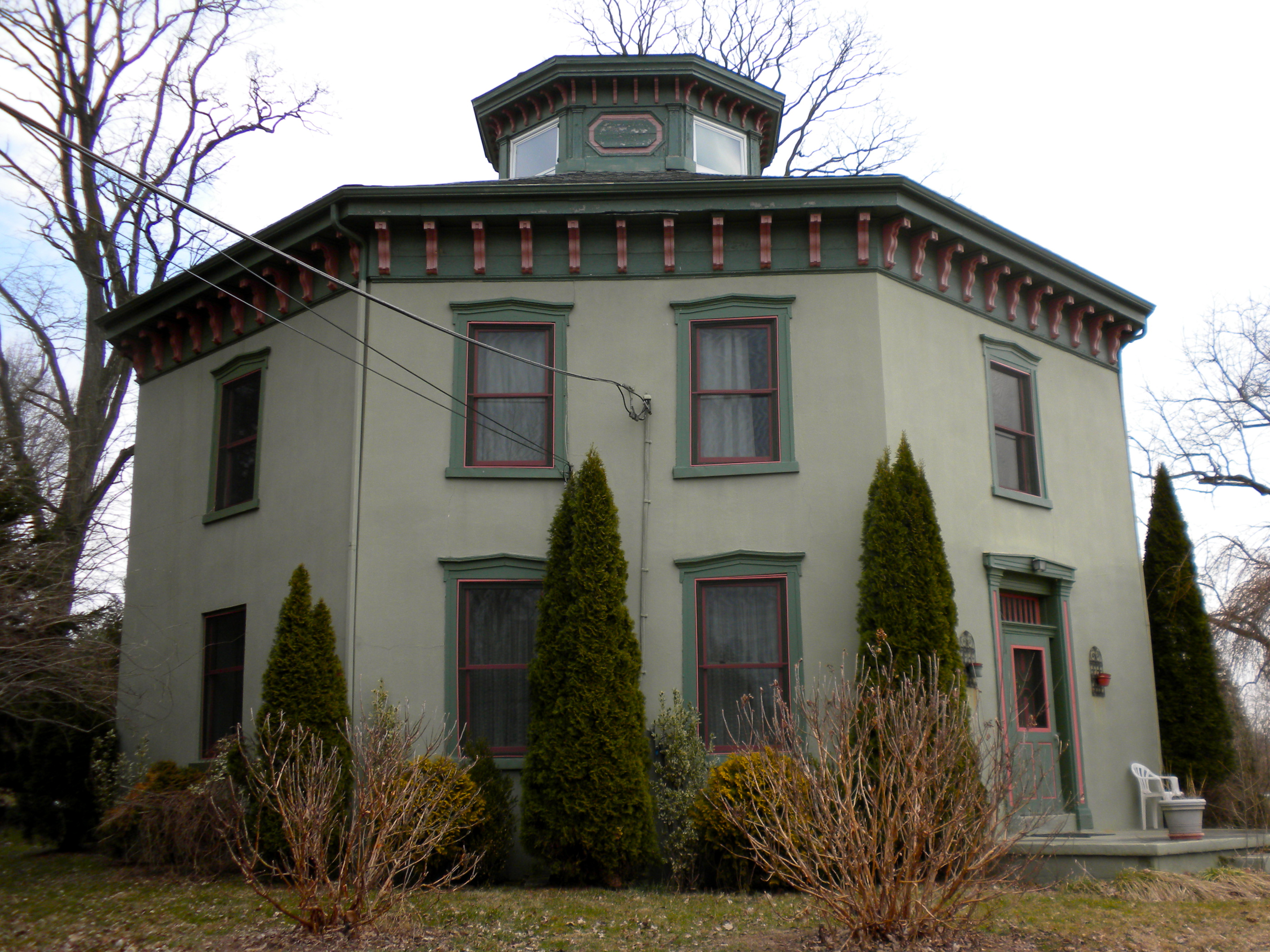
Lukens Pierce House

== Notable people ==
- Smedley Darlington
- Rebecca Lukens
- William Chester Ruth
- Charlotte Moore Sitterly
