= Charlotte Moore Sitterly =

American astronomer (1898–1990)

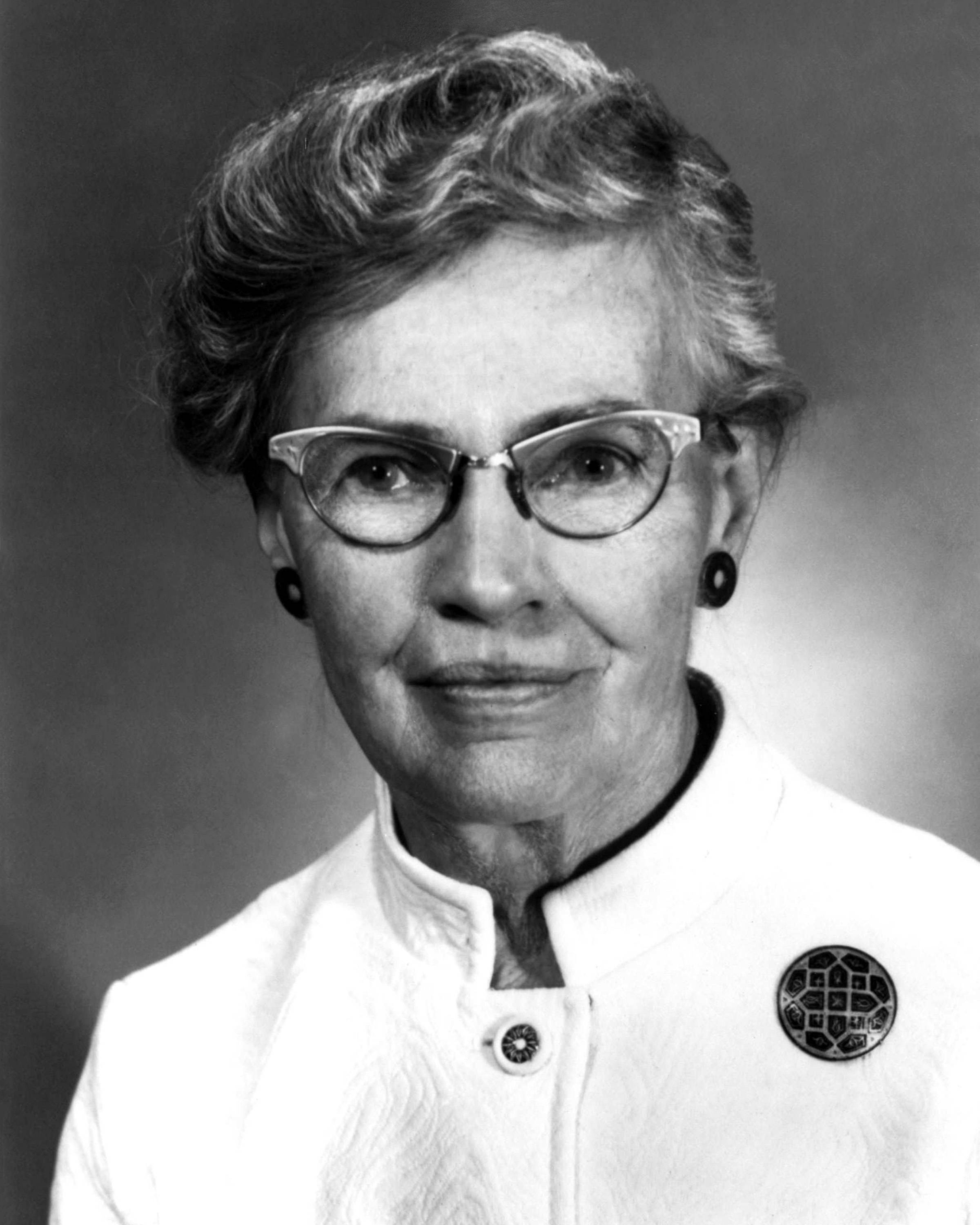
- Sitterly in 1988
- Born: Charlotte Emma Moore; September 24, 1898; Ercildoun, Pennsylvania, U.S.
- Died: March 3, 1990 (aged 91); Washington, D.C., U.S.
- Education: Swarthmore College (BA); University of California, Berkeley (PhD)
- Awards: Annie Jump Cannon Award in Astronomy (1937); Federal Woman's Award (1961); Bruce Medal (1990)
- Scientific career
- Fields: Astronomy
- Workplaces: Princeton University; Mount Wilson Observatory; National Bureau of Standards; Naval Research Laboratory
- Thesis: Atomic lines in the sun-spot spectrum (1931)

Charlotte Emma Moore Sitterly (September 24, 1898 – March 3, 1990) was an American astronomer. She is known for her extensive spectroscopic studies of the Sun and chemical elements. Her data tables are known for their reliability and are still used regularly.

== Early life and education ==
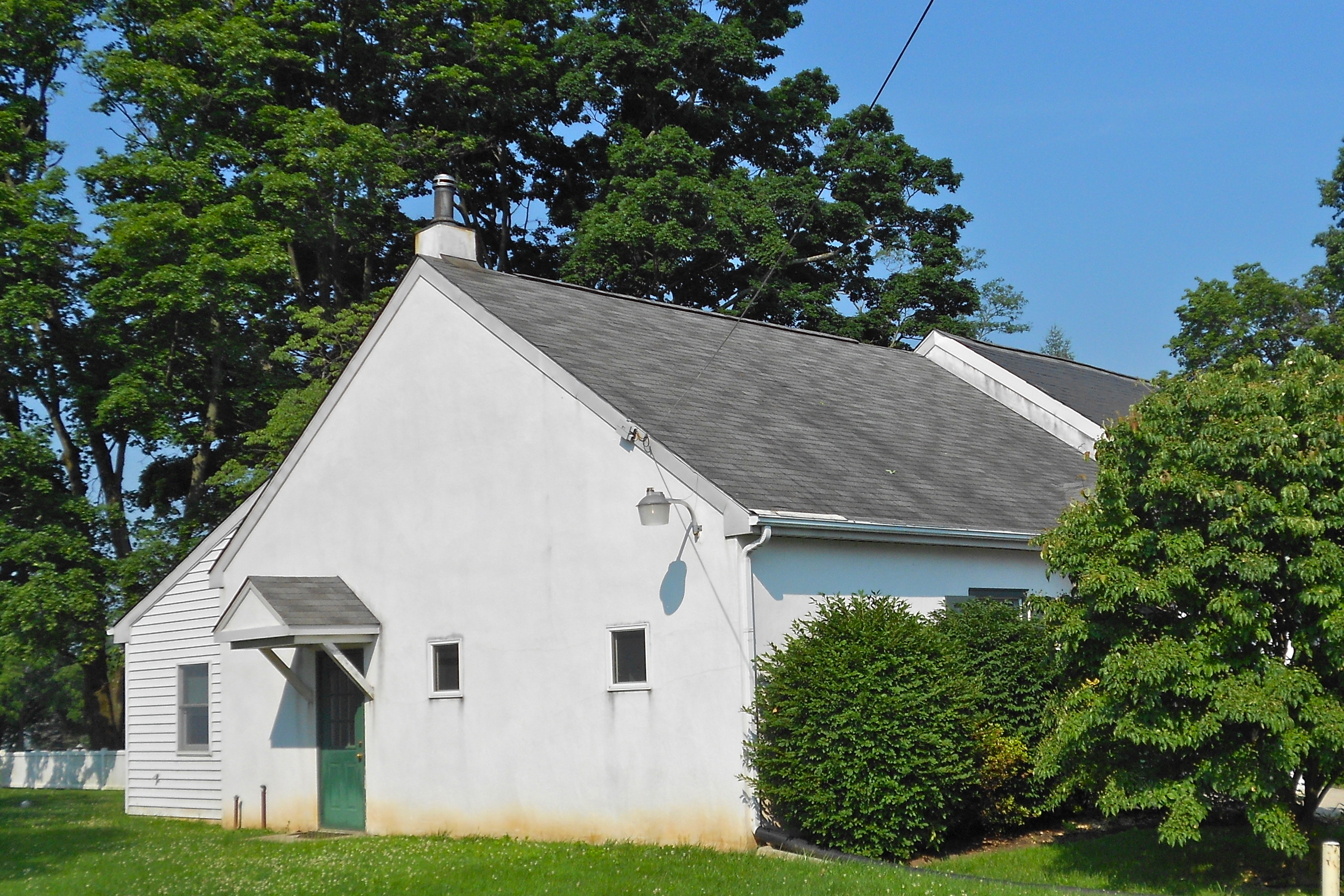
Fallowfield Friends Meeting

Charlotte Moore was born to George W. and Elizabeth Walton Moore in Ercildoun, Pennsylvania, a small village near Coatesville. Her father was the Superintendent of Schools for Chester County and her mother was a schoolteacher. Her parents were Quakers and Charlotte was a lifelong member of Fallowfield Friends Meeting.

She attended Swarthmore College, where she participated in many extracurricular activities, including ice hockey, student government, glee club, and tutoring. To pay her tuition, Moore was a substitute teacher, one of the few ways she thought she could work her way through college. She wanted to pursue a career outside teaching because "I did not enjoy the teaching that I did from first grade through high school. I succeeded at it, but I didn’t like it; it was too wearing."

Moore graduated from Swarthmore in 1920 with a Bachelor of Arts degree in mathematics and went on to Princeton to work as a human computer.

== Career ==
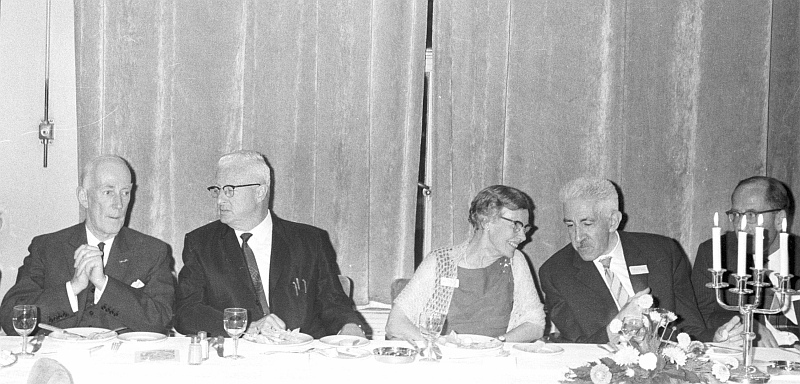
Utrecht astronomy symposium 1963 – Jan Hendrik Oort, Donald Menzel, Charlotte Moore Sitterly, Marcel Minnaert, Albrecht Unsöld

On the recommendation of her mathematics professor at Swarthmore, John. Miller and Moore obtained jobs at the Princeton University Observatory, working for Professor Henry Norris Russell as human computers, carrying out calculations needed to determine the position of the Moon from photographic plates. While working for Russell, Moore initially felt nervous about her inexperience, but over time her interest in astrophysics began to blossom. Russell and Moore researched binary stars and stellar mass, and published extensively on the subject over the years of their collaboration. Her research included an effort to classify 2500 stars based on their spectra.

Although she spent five years at Princeton working under Russell, he refused to consider her for a PhD, an unexceptional fact since there were no women in any of Princeton's graduate programs until 1961. Moore said, “I was used to prejudice against women because Princeton was a man's stronghold, and a woman was really out of step there.” Nevertheless, in 1926, Russell left his own name off a paper they worked on together and used hers alone.

After five years at Princeton, Moore took a leave of absence due to ill health, and she moved to the Mount Wilson Observatory as part of an ongoing collaboration between Russell and research groups there. While at Mount Wilson she worked extensively on solar spectroscopy, analyzing the spectral lines of the Sun and thereby identifying the chemical elements in the Sun. With her collaborators, she analyzed the spectra of sunspots. Moore was able to deduce the temperature of sunspots to be about 4,700 kelvins. Her pictures from the Mount Wilson Observatory helped redetermine the new International Angstrom scale.

She earned a Ph.D. in astronomy in 1931 from the University of California, Berkeley, which had more relaxed rules on women graduates than Princeton, on a Lick Fellowship. Princeton still did not accept women – and would not for the next 30 years. While working on her Ph.D, she continued researching spectroscopy and collected and analyzed data about the spectra of chemical elements and molecules. After obtaining her Ph.D, she returned to Princeton to continue work with Russell as a research assistant.

One of her most significant contributions to physics was her identification of technetium in sunlight, the first example of its natural occurrence. She joined the then National Bureau of Standards (NBS) in 1945. Her tables of atomic spectra and energy levels, published by NBS, have remained essential references in spectroscopy for decades. While there, she began to research the infrared solar spectrum and atomic energy levels. Beginning in 1946, Moore was able to extend her work on ultraviolet spectral lines thanks to the work of Richard Tousey and measurements taken on V-2 rockets; prior to this, Moore's studies were limited to telescopic observations partially blocked by the Earth's atmosphere. Moore collaborated with Tousey for decades, which led to her 1950 publication, "Ultraviolet Multiplet Table."

In 1949, she became the first woman elected as an associate of the Royal Astronomical Society of Great Britain, in honor of her work on multiplet tables and in identifying solar spot electra. Throughout her career, she authored and co-authored over 100 papers and attended the tenth general assembly of the International Astronomical Union, held by the Joint Commission on Spectroscopy in Moscow in 1958. Sitterly retired from her position at the NBS when she turned 70 in 1968, but continued her research at the Naval Research Laboratory. Sitterly was honored by the Journal of the Optical Society of America by a commemorative issue in 1988.

== Personal life ==
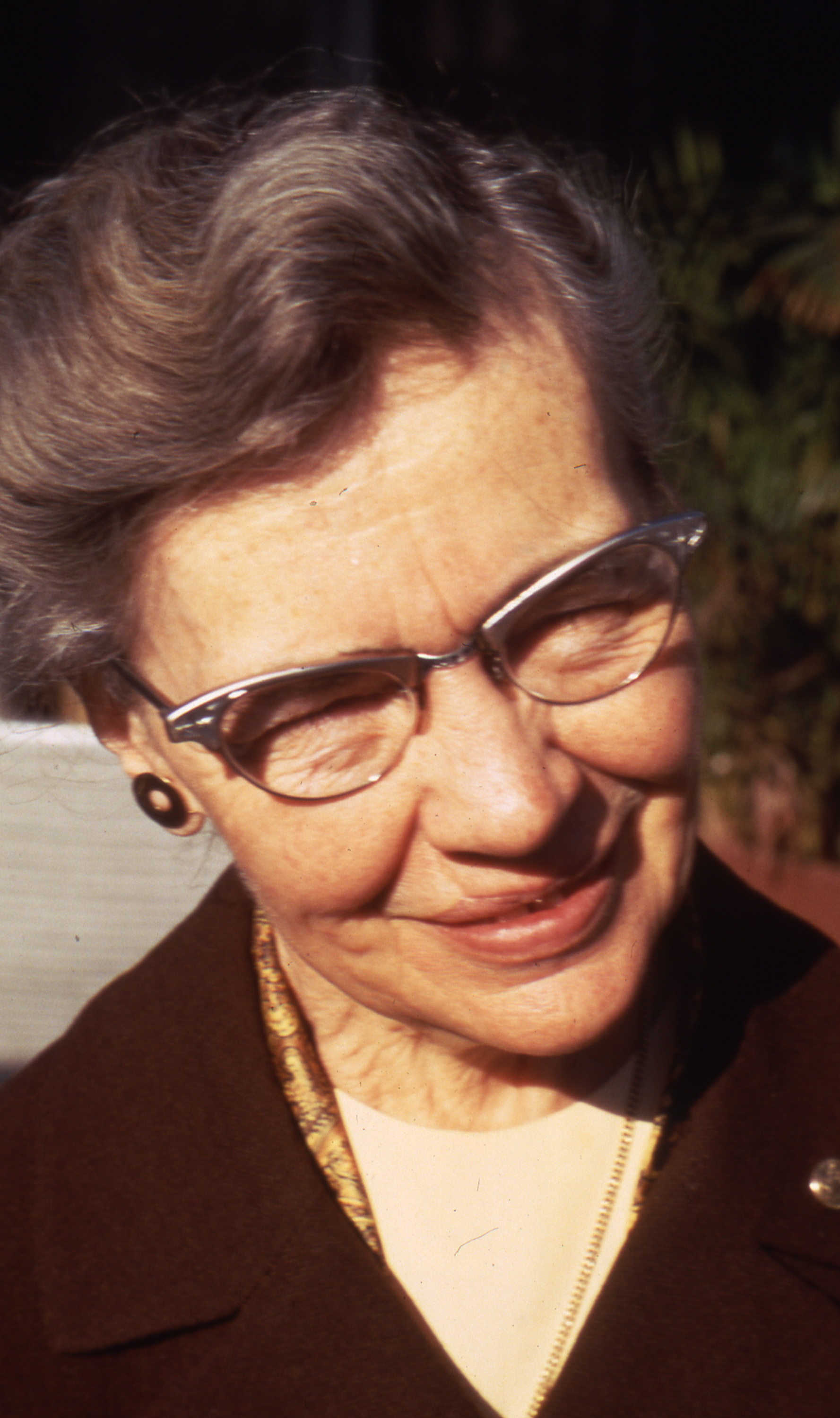
Portrait of Charlotte Moore Sitterly

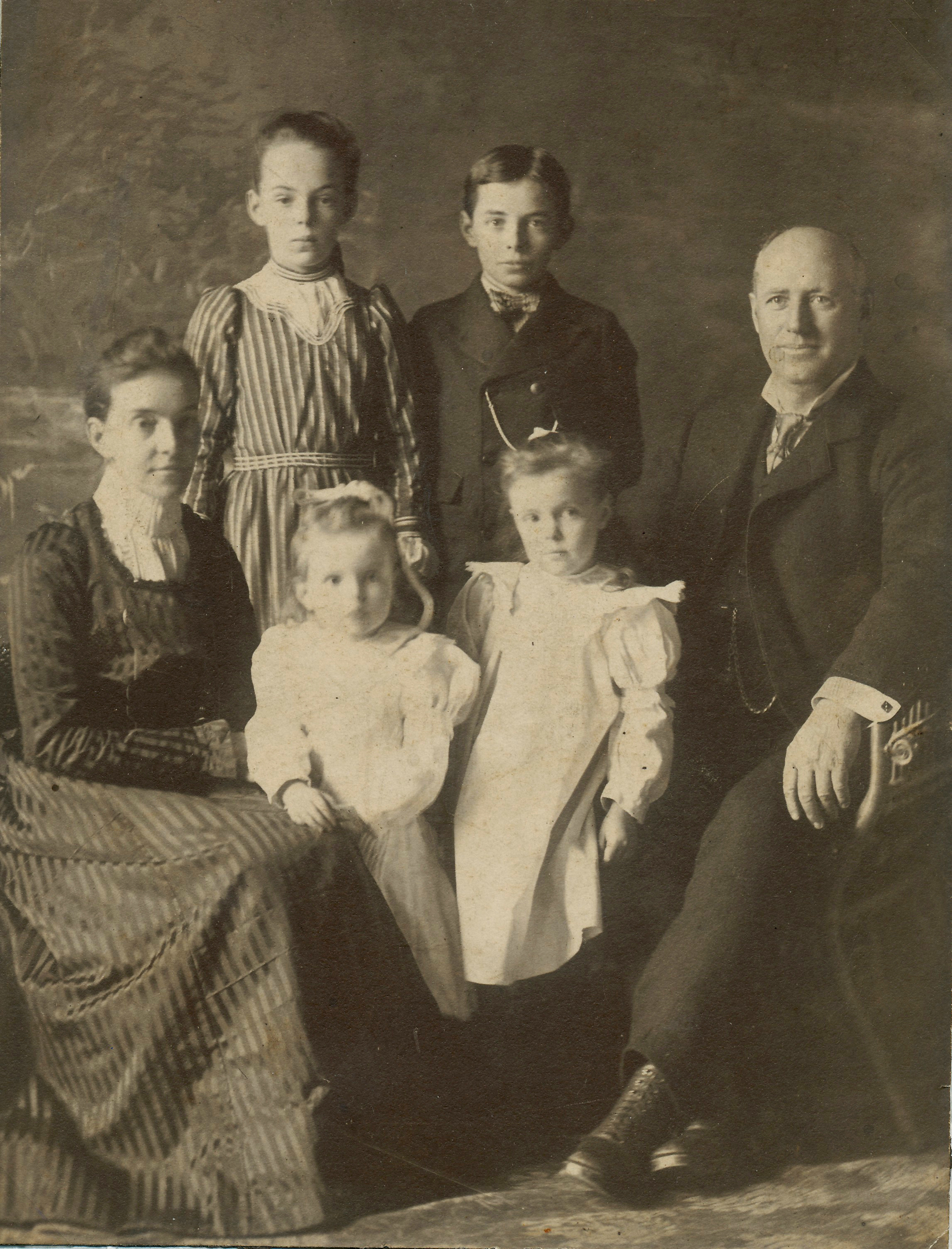
Portrait of Charlotte Moore Sitterly's family in 1902. From left are: (mother) Elizabeth Walton Moore; siblings Frances and Lawrence (standing); Charlotte and Mary (seated), and her father, George Winfield Moore, seated right.

While working at Princeton in the 1920s, she met physicist Bancroft W. Sitterly, whom she eventually married on May 30, 1937. She continued to publish in journals under her maiden name because most of her recognition was under that name.

She believed that traveling is one of the most important aspects of a scientist's life, as it promotes collaboration between scientists. She enjoyed gardening, traveling, and music with her husband until he died in 1977. She continued her research until her death from heart failure at the age of 91.

== Honors ==
Awards

- Annie J. Cannon Award (1937)
- Fellow of the Optical Society (1959) – member of the first class of OSA Fellows, one of only five women in the class of 115.
- Federal Woman's Award (1961)
- William F. Meggers Award of the Optical Society (1972)
- Bruce Medal (1990)

Service

- Vice President, American Astronomical Society
- Vice President, American Association for the Advancement of Science Section D
- President, Commission on Fundamental Spectroscopic Data, International Astronomical Union

Named after her

- Asteroid 2110 Moore-Sitterly

== Works ==
- A Multiplet Table of Astrophysical Interest, 1933
- The Solar Spectrum (with Harold D. Babcock), 1947
- The Masses of the Stars (with Henry Norris Russell), 1940
- Ultraviolet Multiplet Table, 1950
- Atomic Energy Levels as Derived from the Analyses of Optical Spectra, 1958
