= Darlington Seminary =

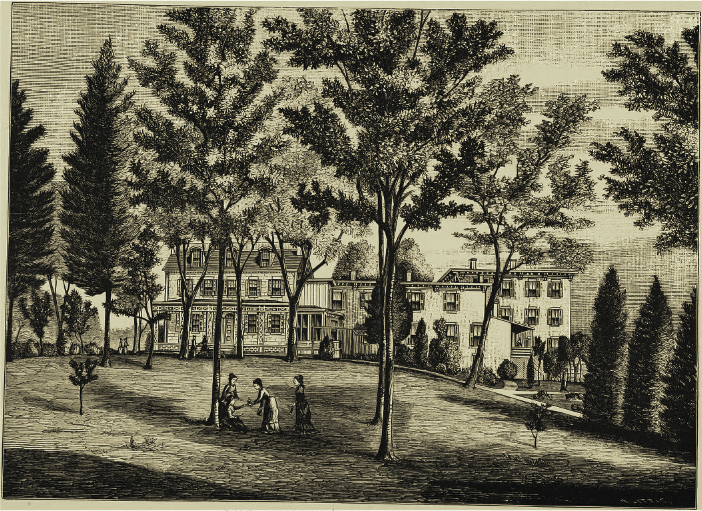
- 1881
- West Chester, Pennsylvania. U.S.

Information
- Former name: Ercildoun Seminary
- Type: nonsectarian single-sex boarding school
- Established: 1851
- Founder: Smedley Darlington
- Gender: Female

Darlington Seminary (originally, Ercildoun Seminary; secondly, Ercildoun Seminary for Young Ladies) was a nonsectarian single-sex boarding school in Chester County, Pennsylvania, United States. It was the largest private school in the county, and one of the largest in Eastern Pennsylvania. Established in Ercildoun in 1851 as Ercildoun Seminary, it was renamed Darlington Seminary after its move to West Chester in 1877 following the destruction caused by the tornado of July 1st.

Ercildoun Seminary was founded in 1851 by Smedley Darlington as a boys' school but soon thereafter was changed to one exclusively for girls. Richard Darlington, Ph.D., a younger brother, purchased the school from Smedley Darlington in 1861 and conducted Ercildoun Seminary until 1877 when a tornado occurred which almost completely destroyed the school property in the summer of 1877. Later in the year, Dr. Darlington moved the institution to a location just outside the Borough of West Chester, and with the move, renamed the institution as Darlington Seminary. Darlington educated thousands of young women from every part of the country, the school being one of the most successful for girls in the Eastern part of Pennsylvania. Dr. Darlington sold the school in 1901 to Frank Paxson Bye, who incorporated the school under the name of The Darlington Seminary. By 1941, the institution had become a vocational school for girls.

== Ercildoun ==
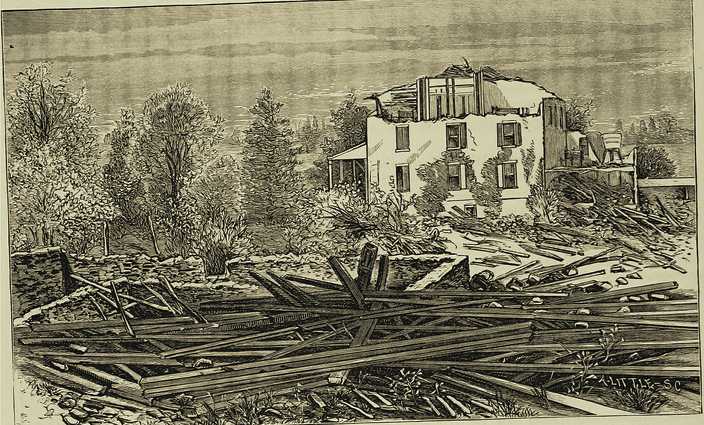
Ercildoun Seminary, after the tornado of July 1, 1877

Ercildoun Seminary for Young Ladies was founded by Smedley Darlington in 1851, in Ercildoun, Pennsylvania. It was conducted as a boys' school for three years, at which time, it was converted into a school for young ladies.

Smedley Darlington was succeeded in 1861 by his brother, Richard Darlington Jr. who bought the Ercildoun Seminary for Young Ladies. While at Ercildoun, the school had over 1,200 boarders.

The large school buildings were nearly demolished by a tornado in July 1877, including also a new dwelling in under construction, which was injured. The unfinished dwelling was entirely demolished. The trees in the lawn were in many instances either overthrown or the tops were twisted off. A potato patch in the rear of the dwelling was rendered entirely bare, all of the new growth being scraped off by the friction of the storm-cloud. The injury to the Ercildoun Seminary property was over US$10,000.

== West Chester ==
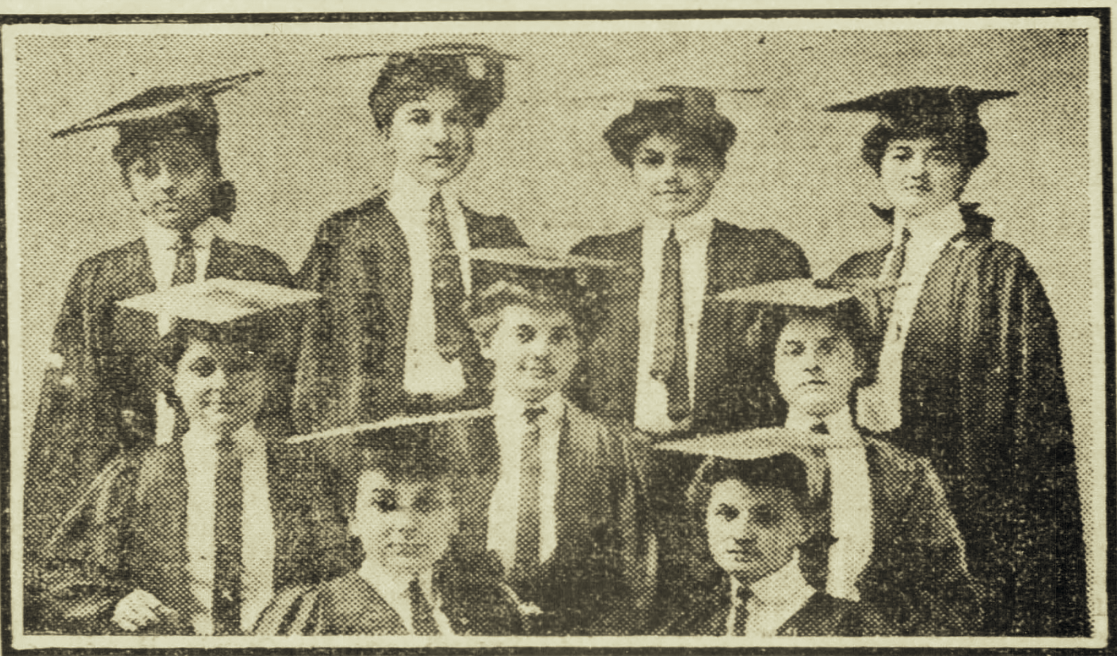
Class of 1903

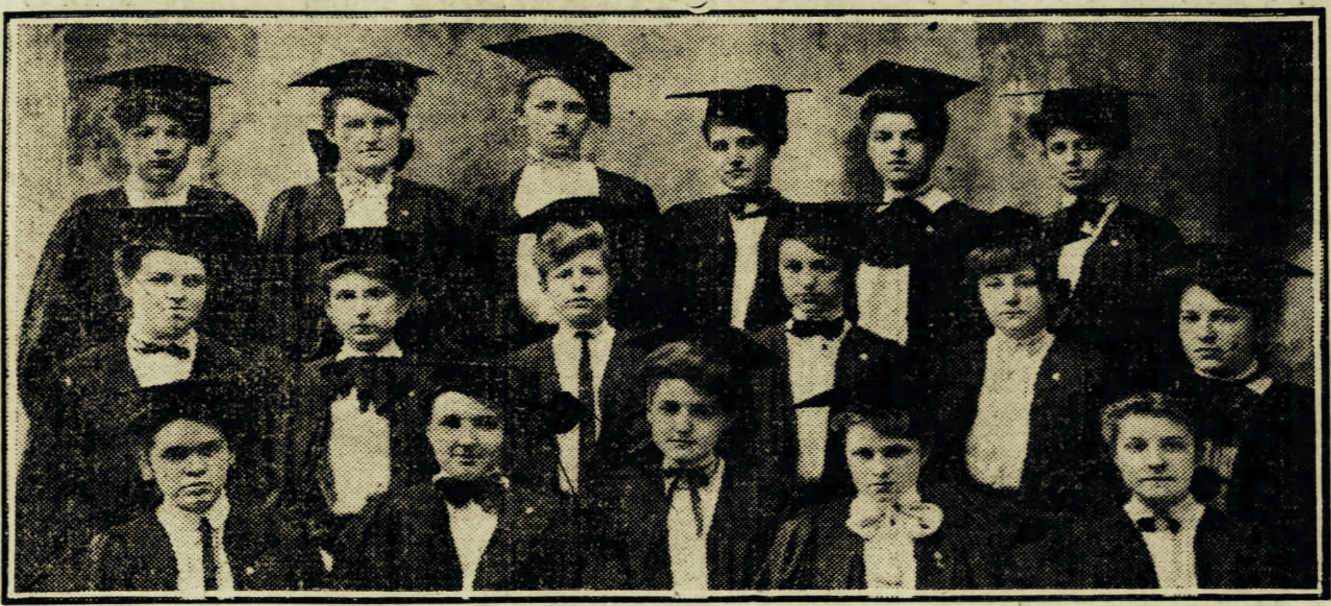
Class of 1904

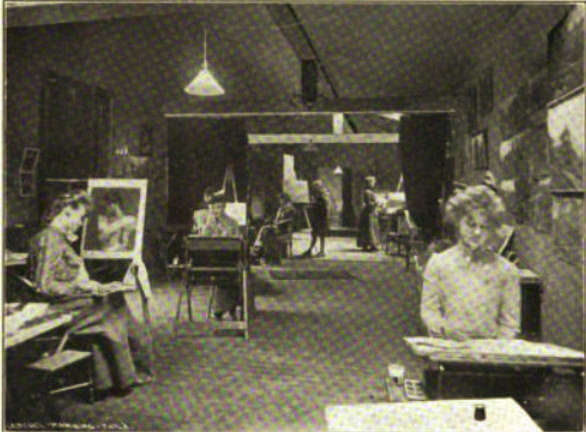
Classroom, 1905

In that year, Darlington purchased a property .75 miles (1.21 km) southwest of West Chester, along the Wissahickon Creek, to which he removed the school in October.

The following year, Darlington Seminary began its 24th school year. The grounds were beautiful and included 26 acres (11 ha), with fruit and ornamental shade trees. The curriculum included languages, music, drawing, and painting. Though the school buildings had the capacity for about 60 boarders, they were frequently unable to accommodate all who desired to attend. Four teachers were employed, and the pupils came from all over the U.S. Pupils, on completing the full course of study, received diplomas.

While still flourishing, Dr. Darlington sold the school in 1901 to Frank P. Bye, at one time Superintendent of Schools in Chester County, Pennsylvania. Under Bye's supervision, it became incorporated under the name of The Darlington Seminary.

In 1905, the school celebrated its 55 years of operation with Bye as president.

By 1941, the institution had become a vocational school for girls.

== Legacy ==
Biographical and historical documents regarding Ercildoun Seminary and Darlington Seminary are held by Friends Historical Library of Swarthmore College Library.

== Notable people ==
=== Alumni ===
- Margaret F. Butler (1861-1931), physician
- Isabel Darlington (1865-1950), lawyer
- Sara Haines Smith Hoge 1864–1939), temperance advocate
- Pauline Moore (1914-2001), actress

=== Faculty ===
- George Cope (artist) (1855-1929), painter
