= Isabel Darlington =

American lawyer (1865–1950)

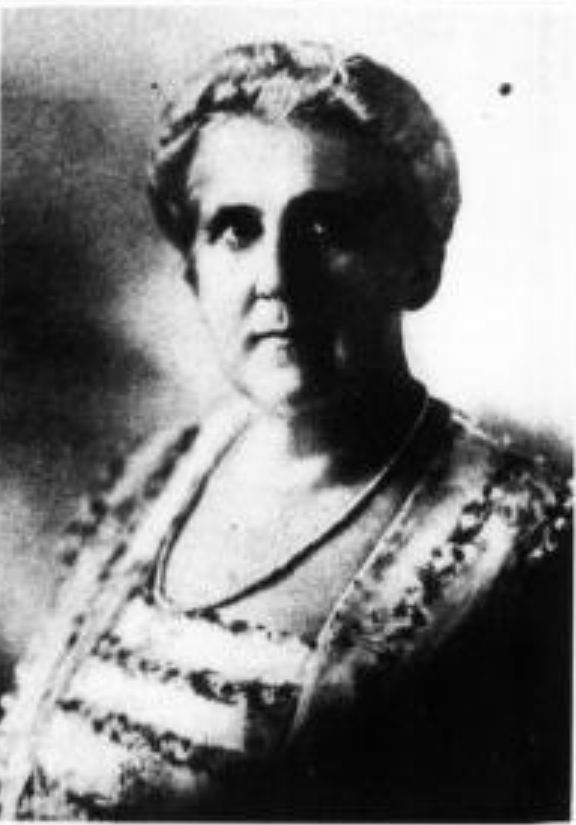
- Darlington c. 1925
- Born: June 22, 1865; West Chester, Pennsylvania, US
- Died: June 24, 1950 (aged 85); West Chester, Pennsylvania, US
- Resting place: Oaklands Cemetery
- Education: Wellesley College (BS); University of Pennsylvania Law School (LLB)
- Occupation: Lawyer
- Years active: 1897–1950
- Known for: First woman lawyer in Chester County, Pennsylvania
- Father: Smedley Darlington
- Relatives: Smedley Butler (nephew); Thomas S. Butler (brother-in-law)

Isabel Darlington (June 22, 1865 – June 24, 1950) was an American lawyer and the first woman to gain admittance to the bar and practice law in Chester County, Pennsylvania. Specializing in estate and business law, Darlington handled the legal affairs of industrialist Pierre S. du Pont, including his purchase of Longwood Gardens in 1906. She was the sole woman practicing law in Chester County for 45 years. A native of West Chester and alumna of Wellesley College and the University of Pennsylvania Law School, Darlington was the daughter of Congressman Smedley Darlington and the aunt of General Smedley Butler.

== Early life and education ==
Isabel Darlington was born in West Chester, Pennsylvania, on June 22, 1865. The Darlington family had long exercised considerable influence in the region, with her relations including Isaac Darlington, William Darlington, and Edward Darlington. Her father was Smedley Darlington, a two-term Republican congressman, banker, and oil and real estate investor. Her mother was Mary Edwards Baker. Isabel was one of eleven children, four of whom died in infancy. Her sister Maud married Republican Congressman Thomas Stalker Butler. One of their children was renowned Marine Corps Major General Smedley Butler.

Isabel Darlington attended Darlington Seminary, a girls' school in East Bradford Township owned by her father. She graduated cum laude from Wellesley College in 1886 and accompanied her father to the Capitol in Washington, D.C., where she served as his private secretary. She also accompanied him on business trips to Western states where he owned extensive lands. She grew up amid wealth and privilege—the Darlingtons' net worth reached $1 million before the Panic of 1893 cost the family much of its fortune. "I realized that it might be wise to make some independent provision for the future," Isabel recalled.

Seeking to gain independent means, Darlington enrolled in the University of Pennsylvania Law School in 1896 after studying for the summer at Carlisle Law School. Her Penn Law application was ignored at first and she had to petition the dean directly, vowing to show up for class anyway if she were not accepted. She completed the three-year Bachelor of Laws program in 18 months and graduated at the top of her class, overcoming reluctance from faculty members who had been reluctant to admit her, let alone confer a degree. She gained admittance to the Chester County Bar on October 4, 1897. Darlington became the second woman to graduate from Penn Law (the first was Carrie Burnham Kilgore in 1883) and the first woman to practice law in Chester County. This achievement made her one of only 140 women lawyers and law students in the country at the time.

== Career and service ==
Darlington began her career clerking for her brother-in-law, Thomas S. Butler. She eventually rose to partner in Butler's West Chester law firm. She specialized in business and property law and famously handled industrialist Pierre S. du Pont's purchase of Longwood Gardens in 1906. She gained admittance to practice before the Superior Court of Pennsylvania in 1902 and before the Supreme Court of Pennsylvania in 1907, though she generally avoided courtroom trials. She was the second woman lawyer ever to practice before these courts, following Carrie Burnham Kilgore. Darlington also became the nation's first woman bank receiver at Parkesburg National Bank from 1924 to 1926. She was elected president of the Chester County Bar Association on January 14, 1941, becoming the first woman to attain such an office in Pennsylvania. Darlington practiced law for a total of 53 years, including 45 years as the only woman lawyer in Chester County. Only in 1941 was the county's second female attorney, Helen Wade Parke, admitted to the bar.

Darlington was active in public service. She was active in the local Republican Party and served as secretary and treasurer of the Fire Creek Colliers Company (1909) and trustee of West Chester State Normal School (1925). She served as director of the poor in Chester County, president of the Wentworth Home in West Chester, and vice president of the Chester County Historical Society. As chair of the society's financial committee, she raised funds to buy and improve the Chester County History Center building in 1938. She chaired Wellesley College's alumna committee as of 1907 and also served on the endowment committee.

== Personal life ==
Darlington never married and lived quietly with her sister at the family home of Faunbrook, a Victorian mansion in West Chester built in 1860 and purchased by their father in 1867. Her law offices were located at 16 East Market Street, to which she would walk daily until the age of 84. Her great-nephew, Thomas R. Butler, continued to practice law there. Judy and John Cummings bought Faunbrook from the Darlington family in 1982 and turned it into a high-end bed and breakfast and wedding venue.

Like her father, Darlington was a Quaker of English descent and used distinctive "thy" and "thou" pronouns in letters to her nephew, Smedley Butler. Later in life, she became a member of the Church of Christ, Scientist. A lifelong member of the Republican Party, she was active in the Women's Republican Club of Chester County.

Darlington died of heart failure at Faunbrook on Saturday, June 24, 1950, at the age of 85. She was buried in Oaklands Cemetery in West Chester.
