= George Cope (artist) =

American painter (1855–1929)

- Born: February 4, 1855; West Chester, Pennsylvania, U.S.
- Died: January 15, 1929 (aged 73); West Chester, Pennsylvania, U.S.
- Resting place: Oaklands Cemetery
- Known for: Landscape painting, still lifes

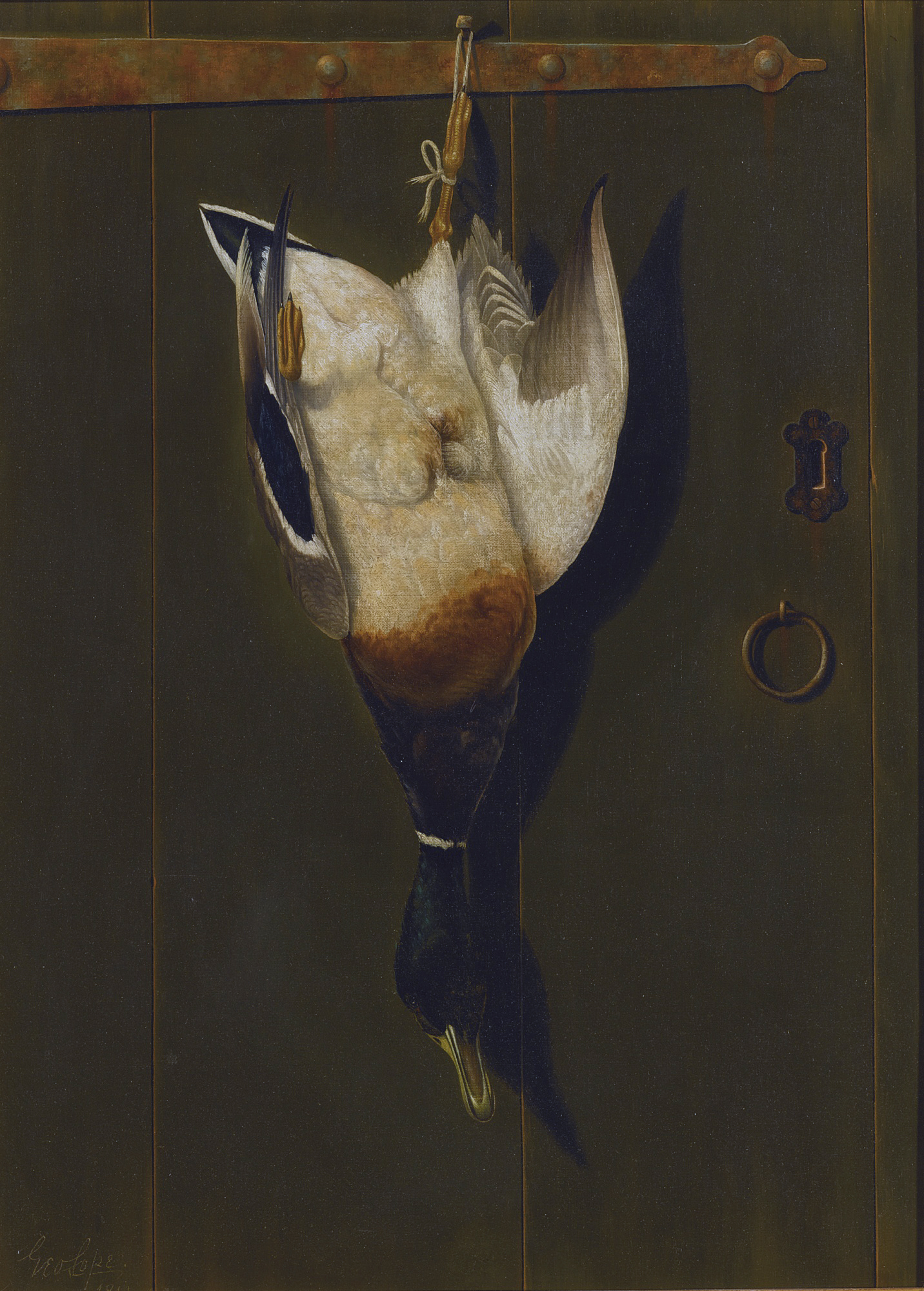
Mallard, after the hunt (1910)

George Cope (February 4, 1855 – January 15, 1929) was an American painter who specialized in landscapes and still lifes. His works are held in the permanent collections of the Art Institute of Chicago and the Brandywine River Museum of Art.

== Life ==
Cope was born in West Chester, Pennsylvania, to parents Lydia (Eldridge) Cope and Caleb Swayne Cope. He moved to Philadelphia and married Theodora Blair, in 1883. They had two children.

== Career ==
Cope trained with Hermann Herzog and specialized in painting landscapes and still lifes. Between 1879 and 1882, he traveled around the American West. After he returned to Philadelphia, he taught art at Darlington Seminary.

== Notable collections ==
- Civil War Regalia of Major Levi Gheen McCauley, 1887, oil on canvas, in the collection of the Art Institute of Chicago
- Indian Relics, 1891, oil on canvas, in the collection of the Brandywine River Museum of Art
- The Hunters Equipment (The Hunters Yellow Jacket), 1891, oil on canvas, in the collection of the Brandywine River Museum
- Cope's Bridge, 1896, oil on canvas, in the collection of the Brandywine River Museum
