= Smedley Darlington =

American politician (1827–1899)

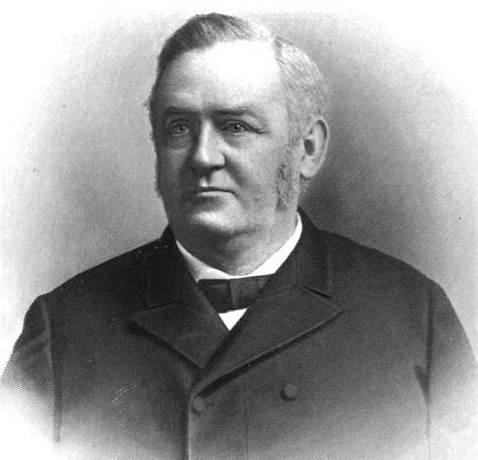

Member of the U.S. House of Representatives from Pennsylvania's 6th district
- In office March 4, 1887 – March 3, 1891
- Preceded by: James B. Everhart
- Succeeded by: John B. Robinson

Personal details
- Born: December 24, 1827 Pocopson Township, Pennsylvania
- Died: June 24, 1899 (aged 71) West Chester, Pennsylvania
- Resting place: Oaklands Cemetery, West Chester, Pennsylvania
- Party: Republican
- Spouse: Mary Edwards Baker (m. 1851)
- Children: 11
- Relatives: Thomas S. Butler (son-in-law); Smedley Butler (grandson); Isabel Darlington (daughter)
- Occupation: Teacher; Businessman

Military service
- Allegiance: United States
- Branch/service: Pennsylvania Emergency Militia
- Years of service: 1862
- Rank: Private
- Unit: Beaumont's Independent Company of Cavalry
- Battles/wars: American Civil War: Defense of Pennsylvania

Smedley Darlington (December 24, 1827 – June 24, 1899) was an American politician who served as a Republican member of the U.S. House of Representatives for Pennsylvania's 6th congressional district from 1887 to 1891.

== Biography ==
Darlington was born in Pocopson Township, Pennsylvania on December 24, 1827, the son of Richard and Edith (Smedley) Darlington. He attended the common schools and the Friends' Central School in Philadelphia. He taught at Friends’ Central School for several years, and while teaching he made stenographic reports of sermons, lectures, and speeches for the newspapers of Philadelphia. He established a school in Ercildoun, Pennsylvania. First known as Ercildoun Seminary, it was later called Darlington Seminary, and Darlington operated it as an academy for boys during its first three years, then converted it to a school for girls. Darlington Academy remained open for 12 years.

He enlisted in the Civil War as a private and was subsequently promoted to the rank of captain in Beaumont’s Independent Company of Cavalry, Pennsylvania Volunteer Emergency Militia. He was discharged with the company on September 24, 1862. He moved to West Chester, Pennsylvania, in 1864.

After the war, Darlington became active in banking and investment brokering, and owned interests in several financial institutions and corporations. He was an early entrant into the petroleum industry in the 1880s, and maintained an office in Oil City, Pennsylvania from which he managed his involvement. In 1885, he founded the Chester County Guaranty Trust & Safe Deposit Company, and he served as its president until 1897.

Darlington was a delegate to the 1872 Liberal Republican convention and the 1896 Republican National Convention. In 1886, he was elected as a Republican to the 50th Congress. He was reelected to the 51st Congresses in 1888. Darlington served as a Representative from March 4, 1887 to March 3, 1891 and was not a candidate for renomination in 1890.

Darlington died in West Chester on June 24, 1899. His funeral took place at his home, "Faunbrook" on June 26, and he was buried at Oaklands Cemetery in West Chester.

In 1851, Darlington married Mary Edwards Baker. They were the parents of 11 children, four of whom died in infancy. Their daughter Isabel became the first woman to practice law in Chester County. His daughter Maud became the wife of Thomas S. Butler, who also served in Congress, and the mother of Marine Corps Major General Smedley Darlington Butler. He was the second cousin of Congressmen Edward Darlington, Isaac Darlington, and William Darlington.

== Photos ==
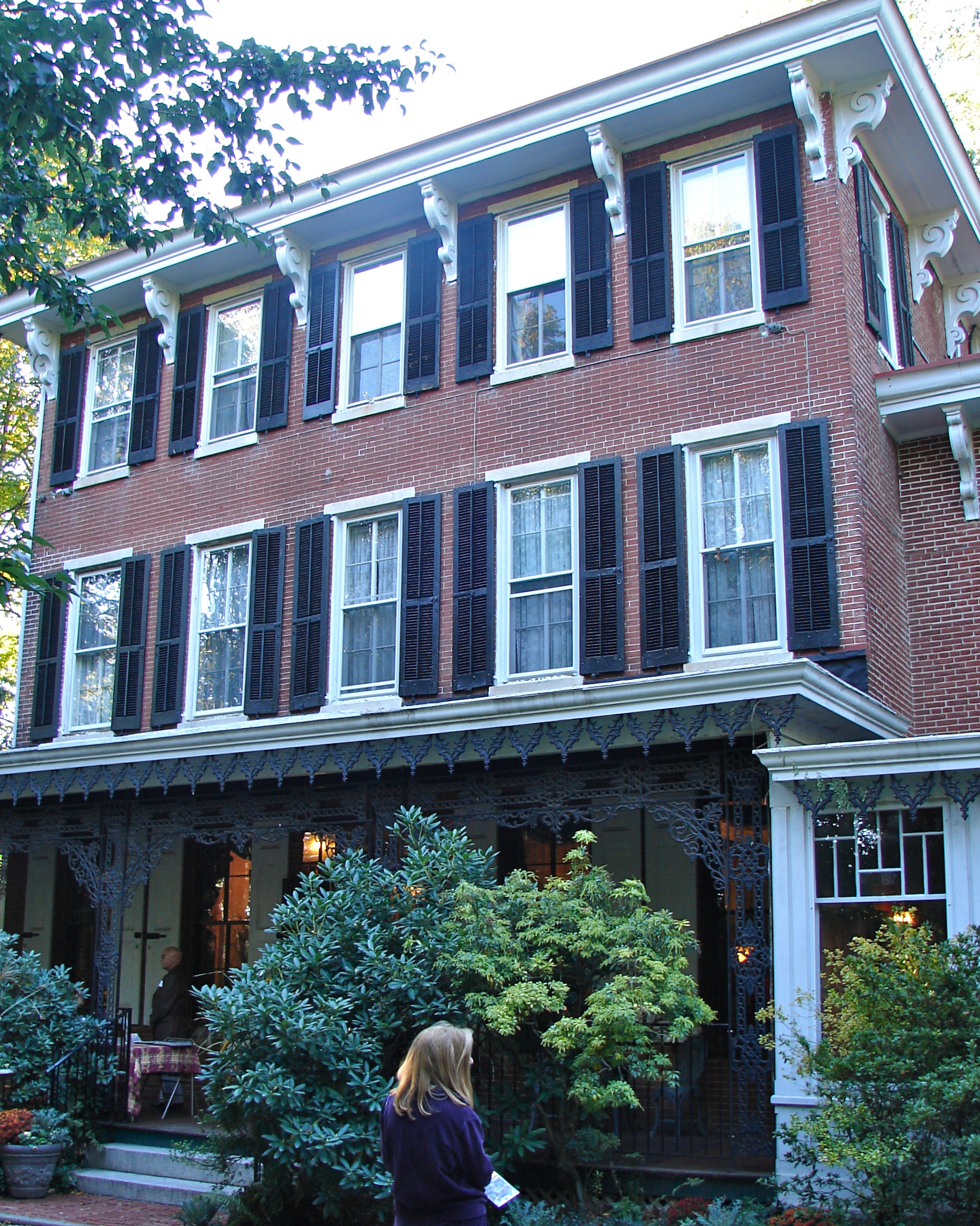
Darlington's house in West Chester

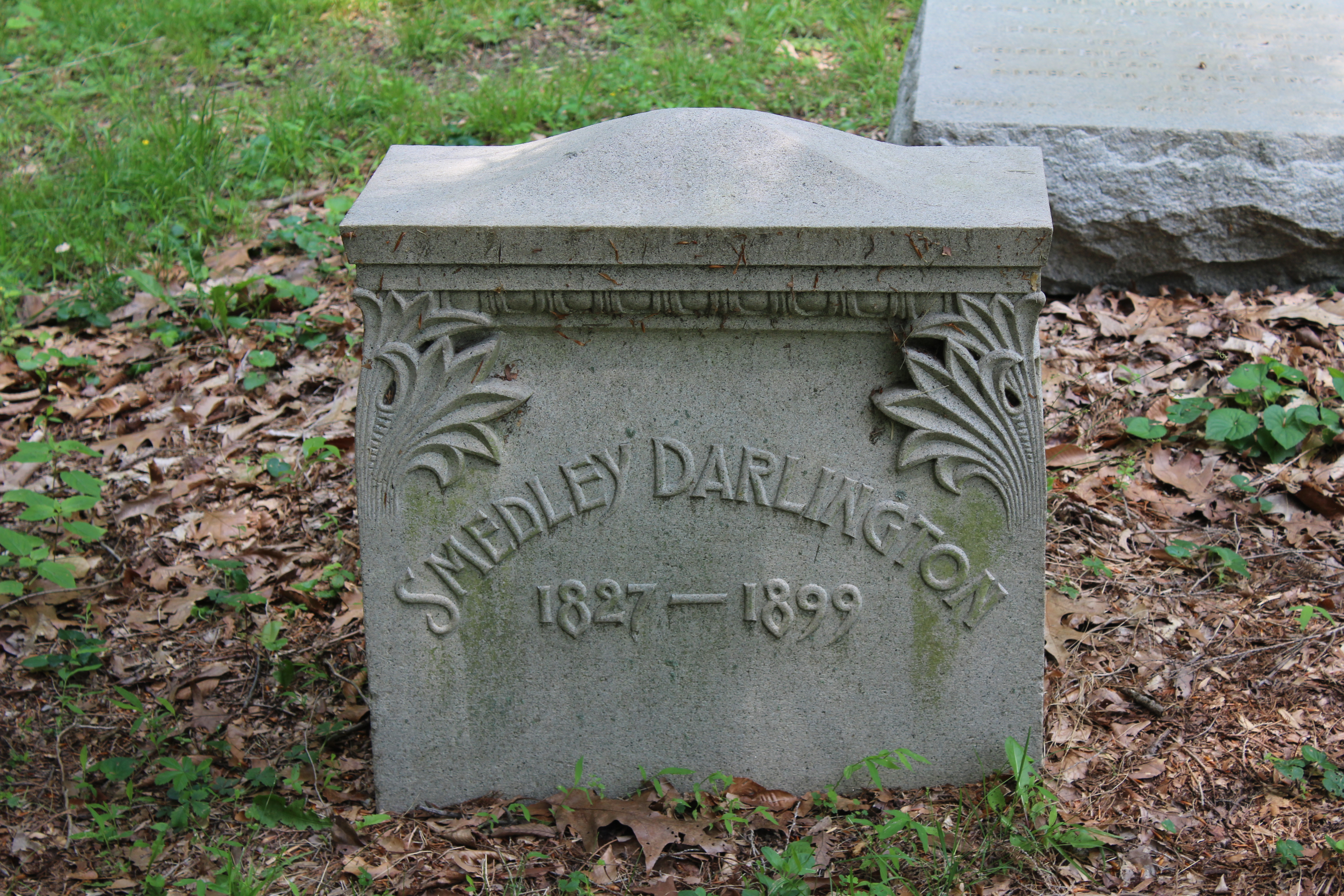
Darlington's grave at Oaklands Cemetery in West Chester, Pennsylvania

== Sources ==
=== Books ===
- The National Cyclopædia of American Biography. Vol. XXXII. New York, NY: James T. White & Company. 1945. p. 160 – via HathiTrust.
- CQ Press (2013). Guide to Congress. Vol. 1. Thousand Oaks, CA: Sage Publications. p. 148. ISBN 978-1-60426-953-6 – via Google Books.
- Schmidt, Hans (1987). Maverick Marine: General Smedley D. Butler and the Contradictions of American Military History. Lexington, KY: University Press of Kentucky. p. 6. ISBN 978-0-8131-0957-2 – via Google Books.

=== Newspapers ===
- "Mr. Darlington's Funeral". The Philadelphia Inquirer. Philadelphia, PA. June 27, 1899. p. 6 – via Newspapers.com.

U.S. House of Representatives
Preceded by James B. Everhart	Member of the U.S. House of Representatives from Pennsylvania's 6th congressional district 1887–1891	Succeeded by John B. Robinson
