= William Chester Ruth =

American machinist and inventor (1882–1971)

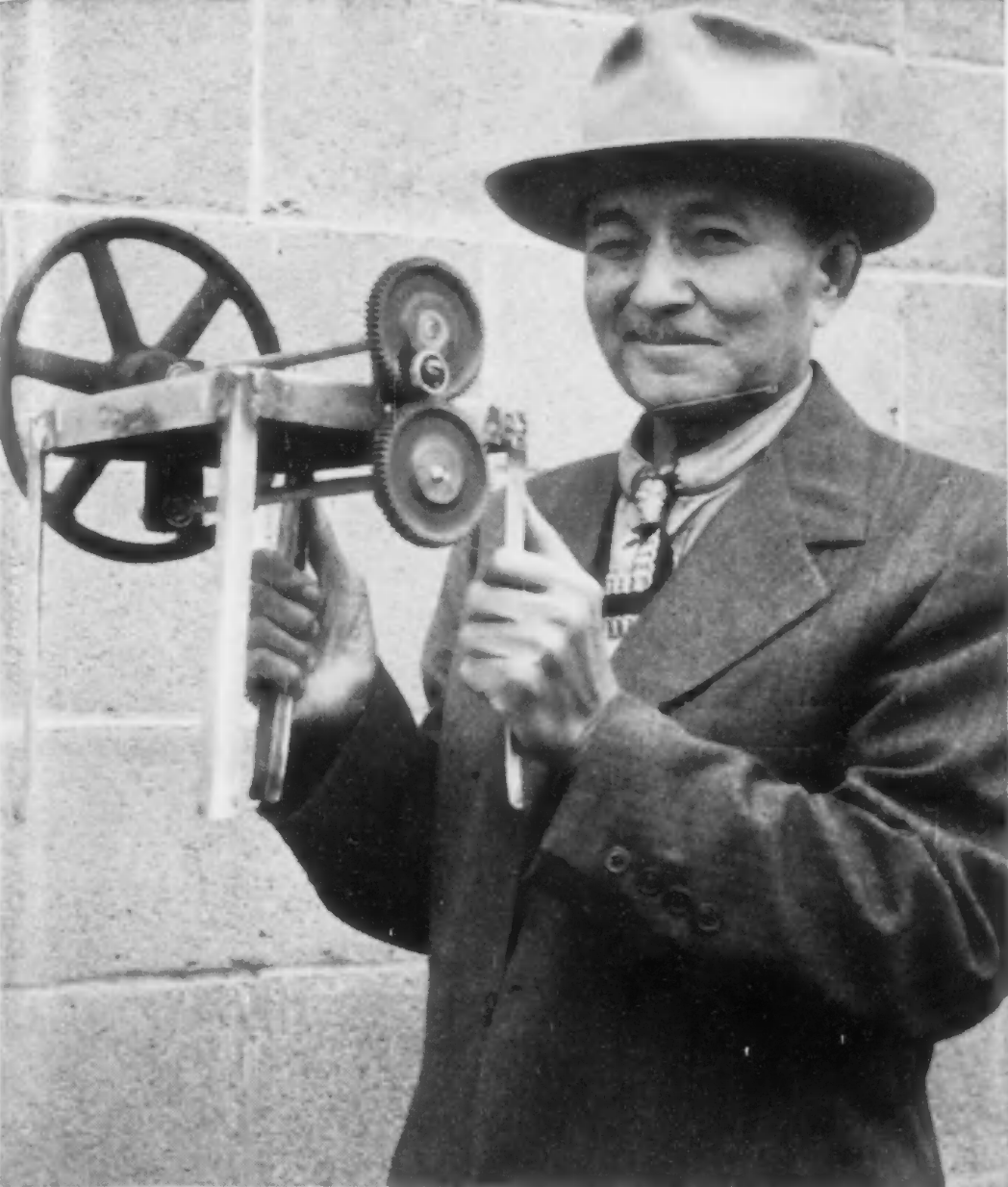
- William Chester Ruth in 1950
- Born: July 19, 1882; Ercildoun, Pennsylvania, U.S.
- Died: April 3, 1971 (aged 88); Gap, Pennsylvania, U.S.
- Occupations: Machinist, inventor
- Known for: African American inventor of combination baler feeder and self-lifting farm elevator

William Chester Ruth (July 19, 1882 – April 3, 1971) was an African American machinist, business owner, and patented inventor who lived in Chester County and Lancaster County, Pennsylvania. The Pennsylvania Historical and Museum Commission dedicated a state historical marker in Ruth's honor in 2006.

== Early life ==
Ruth was born in Ercildoun, Pennsylvania, United States, to Samuel and Louisa Ruth (née Pinn). His father was born into slavery on the South Carolina plantation of Robert Frederick Ruth. Liberated as a teenager when the 54th Massachusetts Infantry Regiment occupied nearby city of Savannah, Georgia, Samuel worked as a regimental water carrier and then as body servant to Lt. Stephen Atkins Swails. After the war, Samuel accompanied two of his Union Army comrades to Pennsylvania, where he married the sister, Maria "Louisa" Pinn, of one of the men. Samuel's father-in-law was Robert A. Pinn, a respected African American minister, attorney, and Medal of Honor recipient. Samuel and Louisa worked for wages and saved enough money to buy a farm outside Ercildoun, where they raised crops and ten children, including William Chester.

As a child, Chester proved insatiably curious about machinery, dissembling and reconstructing machinery around the family farm and thereby incurring his father's ire. He trained as a blacksmith from age 12, later expressing that his greatest regret was never receiving an education past the eighth grade. In 1917, he moved to nearby Gap in Pennsylvania Dutch Country. In 1922, he established a blacksmith shop, Ruth's Ironworks Shop, on U.S. Route 30 in Gap. He shoed horses and repaired farm machinery for the region's predominantly Amish and Mennonite farmers. He tinkered with agricultural equipment based on feedback from customers and soon began designing his own devices to improve mechanical performance.

== Inventions ==
Between 1924 and 1950, Ruth designed and patented numerous mechanical devices. In 1924, he patented his first invention: the Combination Baler Feeder, an after-market device that collected straw exiting a thresher and fed the straw safely and efficiently into the chamber of a baler. The Baler Feeder consisted of a sheet metal hopper, short conveyor, and an array of reciprocating tines, all mounted on a turntable, adaptable to the orientation of sheaf pile and barn site at each customer's farm. Ruth sold more than 5,000 Baler-Feeder machines nationwide, often traveling out of state to install versions of it. By mid-1930, Ruth had received two additional patents for improvements on his feeder, including an automatic tie for a hay baler. These automatic ties sold in their thousands to farmers in the American and Canadian Great Plains. Forty-seven of the machine's 87 parts received individual patents.

Also around 1930, Ruth improved on the farm elevator, a steel chute with chain and slat movement to carry grain or feed bags, hay bales, ear corn, and other products up into a truck, corn crib, or hay mow. Ruth's version of the electric-powered elevator had closely-fixed, but separate, gears for activating the chain conveyor and for raising the elevator. The simple pull of a lever transferred the power of the motor between conveyance and elevator height adjustment. Ruth's self-lifting farm elevator saw widespread adoption, including in the commercial mushroom industry next door in Chester County.

Ruth's inventions went beyond agricultural utility. He designed a cinder-spreading truck bed, the Mechanical Cinder Spreader, and in 1934 sold 150 of his spreaders to the Pennsylvania Department of Transportation for treating icy roads. During World War II, he helped design a bombsight for warplanes. Some of his mechanisms were used to build the Trident Missile. In 1950, he spoke of having designed a "secret weapon" for airplanes.

By 1950, his inventions were earning over $50,000 a year, enabling him to hire six assistants and investing $65,000 to convert his smithy into a machine and welding shop. He also partnered with a local white man, Howard L. Rutter, who assisted him with distribution and marketing to white manufacturers and farmers beyond Lancaster. Ebony profiled Ruth as a successful "Inventor Businessman" in 1950. By the end of his life, Ruth held 52 patents.

The Landis Valley Museum holds working models of Ruth's inventions and a full-scale example of his baler feeder.

== Personal life ==
In 1914, at the age of 32, Ruth took over his father's duties as spiritual leader and lay preacher at Ercildoun's Church of Christ meetinghouse, a small congregation founded by his parents decades earlier. At the age of 70, he continued to lead the congregation and deliver sermons regularly.

Ruth married Gertrude Miller on June 6, 1906. The couple raised one son, Joseph. On April 3, 1971, at the age of 88, Ruth was fatally injured when struck by a car while walking along Lincoln Highway near his shop in Gap. He was interred at the Church of Christ at Ercildoun Cemetery.
