= Margaret F. Butler =

American physician (1861–1931)

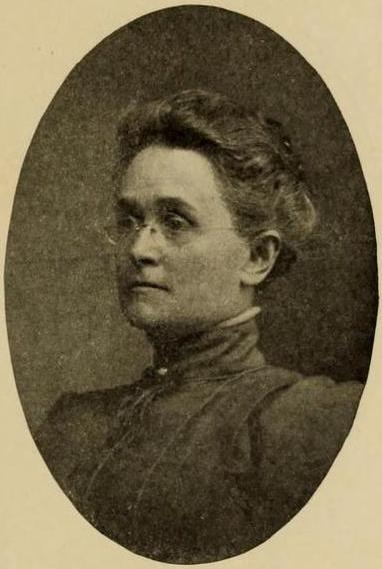
- Butler in 1911
- Born: 1861; Chester County, Pennsylvania, US
- Died: October 16, 1931 (aged 69–70); Philadelphia, Pennsylvania, US
- Education: Woman's Medical College of Pennsylvania (MD, 1894)
- Occupations: Physician, professor
- Employer: Woman's Medical College of Pennsylvania
- Awards: Fellow of the American College of Surgeons

Margaret F. Butler (1861 – October 16, 1931) was an American physician who chaired the otorhinolaryngology department at the Woman's Medical College of Pennsylvania. In 1908, she became the first woman to preside over an international congress of physicians, as the only woman and only American in attendance. She was a fellow of the American College of Surgeons.

== Life and career ==
Butler was born into a Quaker farming family in Chester County, Pennsylvania, in 1861. The eldest of seven children of James Butler and Rachel (James) Butler, she was the niece of prominent state politician Samuel Butler and federal judge William Butler. She commenced schooling at the age of four, attended Darlington Seminary, and taught school from the age of seventeen. She subsequently took correspondence courses through the Society to Encourage Studies at Home.

Encouraged to study medicine by Dr. Theophilus Parvin, Butler earned her Doctor of Medicine degree from the Woman's Medical College of Pennsylvania in 1894 and pursued postgraduate courses in Vienna under physicians Ádám Politzer and Hyack. Returning to Philadelphia, she was appointed professor of the ear, nose, and throat at her alma mater in 1896. She taught at the Woman's Medical College until her death and also served as chair of the otorhinolaryngology department from 1908 until her death. Butler also ran a small private practice from her offices at 1831 Chestnut Street in Philadelphia.

On October 16, 1931, Butler died suddenly of a heart attack while performing a tonsillectomy at the college hospital. The operation was completed by Dr. Ann Catherine Arthurs, and the patient suffered no ill effects.

== Awards and honors ==
In Vienna in April 1908, Butler became the first woman to be elected honorary president and to preside over an international congress of physicians (the first International Congress of Laryngology and Rhinology), where she was the only woman and the only representative from the United States in attendance. Regarded as a "preeminent" diagnostician and surgeon, Butler was elected a Fellow of the American College of Surgeons in 1918. She also was a member of the American Academy of Ophthalmology and Otolaryngology and published articles in The Laryngoscope and other medical journals. A brother, Dr. Ralph Butler, was a laryngologist, and a niece, Dr. Miriam Butler, graduated from the Woman's Medical College in 1929.

According to her New York Times obituary, she was "regarded as one of the leading women surgeons of the country."

The American Head and Neck Society awards the Margaret F. Butler Outstanding Mentor of Women in Head and Neck Surgery Award, honoring "individuals who have demonstrated leadership in promoting gender diversity in the field."
