= Neuwerk =

Wadden Sea island on the German North Sea coast

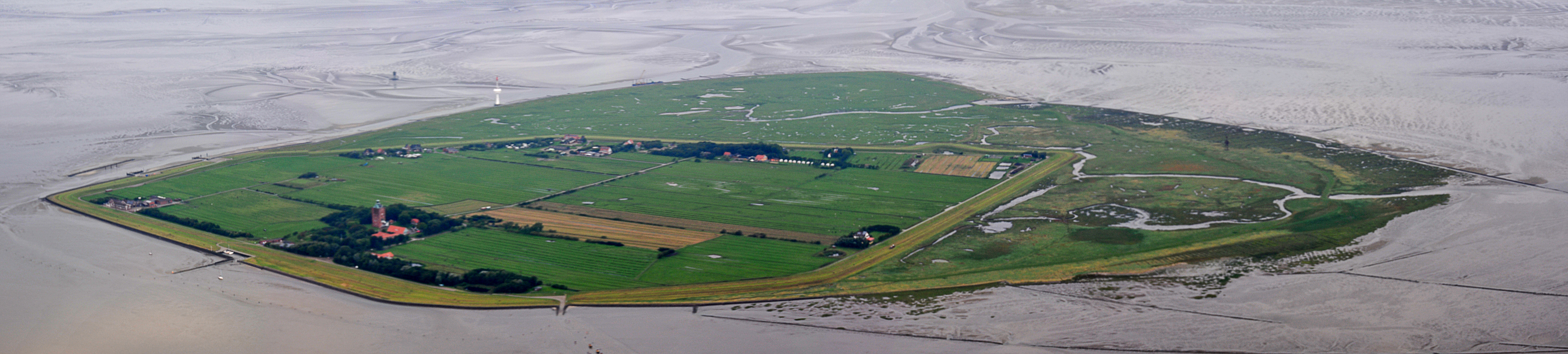
- Neuwerk

- Location of Neuwerk, Scharhörn and Nigehörn in Hamburg-Mitte

- Location within Germany

Geography
- Location: North Sea, Elbe mouth
- Coordinates: 53°55′N 8°30′E
- Area: 3 km^{2} (1.2 sq mi)

Administration
- Germany
- State: Hamburg
- Borough: Hamburg-Mitte

Demographics
- Population: 21 (2024-12-31)
- Pop. density: 7/km^{2} (18/sq mi)

Neuwerk (German pronunciation: [ˌnɔʏˈvɛʁk]; Low German: Neewark; archaic English: New Werk or Newark) is a 3 km^{2} (1.2 sq mi) tidal island in the Wadden Sea ("Mudflat Sea") a marginal part of North Sea along the German coast. The population in 2023 was 21. Neuwerk is located 13 km (8 mi) northwest of Cuxhaven, between the Weser and Elbe estuaries. The distance to the centre of Hamburg is about 120 km (70 mi).

Administratively, Neuwerk forms a homonymous quarter of the city and state of Hamburg, Germany, and is part of the borough Hamburg-Mitte. This quarter includes the islands of Scharhörn and Nigehörn, which are bird sanctuaries and closed to the public. All three islands and the Wadden Sea around them form the Hamburg Wadden Sea National Park.

Dikes encircle the island, which is about 3 square kilometres (1.2 square miles), and one can walk around it in an hour. Salt marshes (the "Outland"), lie outside the dikes and provide a hatchery for birds such as oystercatchers, common terns, sandwich terns, black-headed gull, herring gulls, and others. During the summer, farmers may pasture cows and horses on the northern Outland.

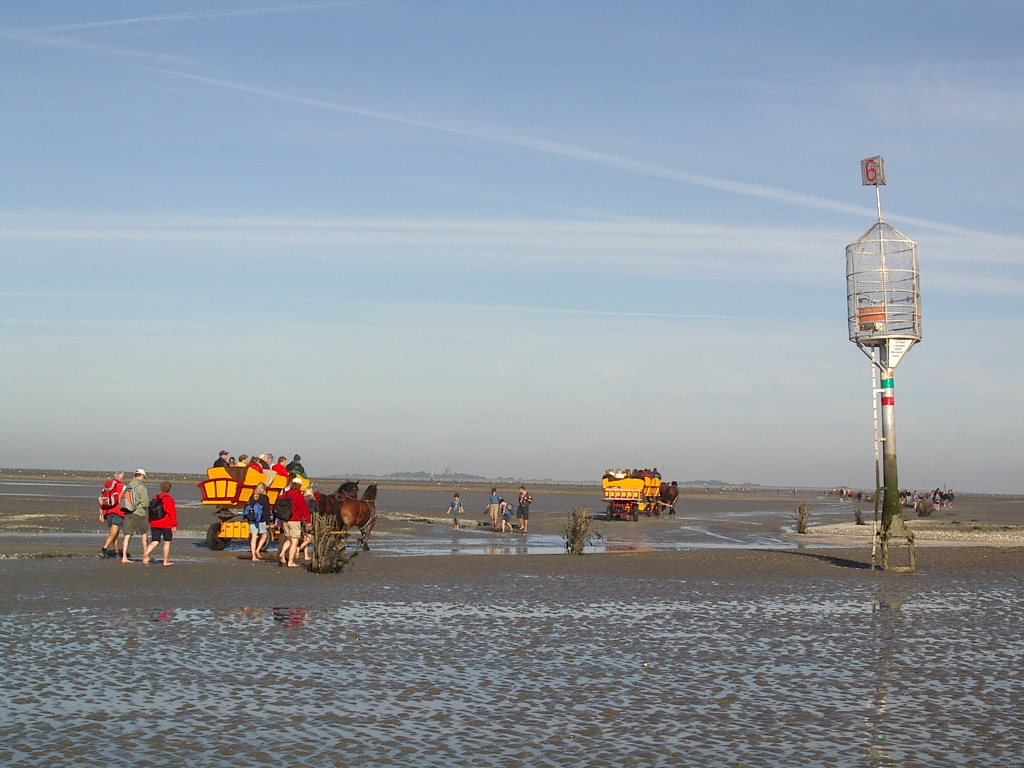
Mudflat car with day trippers in the Sahlenburger Watt near Cuxhaven, on the way to the Neuwerk

At low tide one can reach the island on foot or on a Wattwagen, a horse-drawn mud flat coach, from Cuxhaven. A row of poles on the mud flats marks the way. The path includes some elevated cages. These are rescue pods. Should high tide catch a walker far from shore, the walker can climb into the pod and wait for the tide to recede, or trigger a flare. Triggering the flare summons a rescue boat; rescue involves a fee and non-negligible fine.

During the summer the vessel MS Flipper makes a daily trip at high tide from the "Alte Liebe" port in Cuxhaven to the island. Because departure times depend on the tides, the times are variable. The trip takes about an hour and a half one-way.

One may, for a small fee, visit and ascend the lighthouse to a viewing platform. This provides a view of the coast and the entire island. There is a small hotel with seven guest rooms inside the lighthouse, and a hostel in a building next to the tower. Near the lighthouse there is the "graveyard of the nameless". This is a resting place for the dead bodies that in past years washed ashore. Today, bodies washed ashore are transferred to the continent.

== History ==
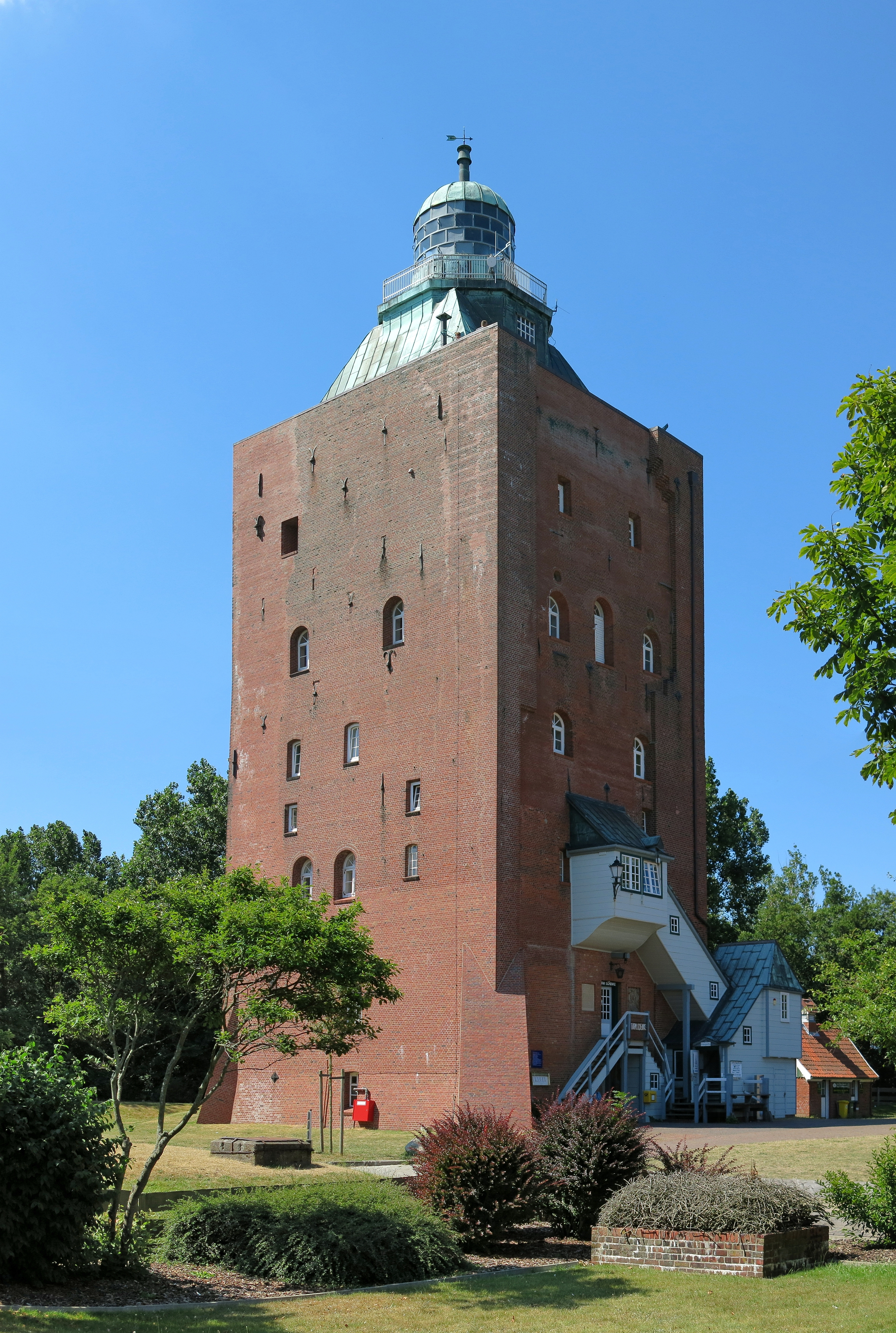
Neuwerk lighthouse of 1369.

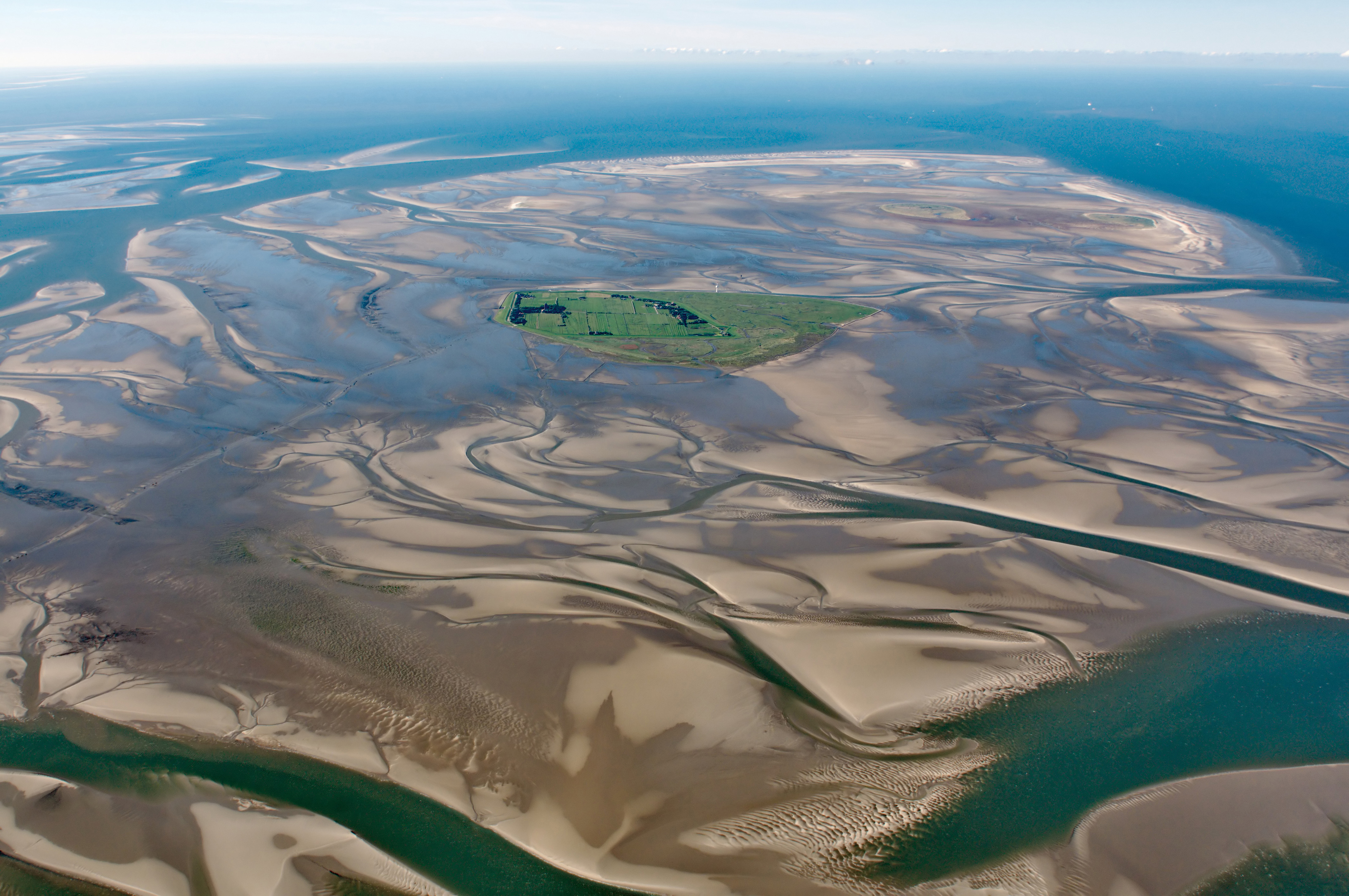
In this aerial picture, the island Neuwerk appears in green.

Because the Elbe was vital to Hamburg, a member of the Hanseatic League, the city's merchants with those from Bremen and Stade obtained the permission (a deed of 24 April 1286) from Albert II, Duke of Saxony and his minor nephews Albert III, Eric I and John II, altogether co-ruling feudal lords of the Land of Hadeln of which Neuwerk formed a part then, to maintain a permanent fire on a mud flat island, then named O or Nige O, in the mouth of the Elbe.

On 1 November 1299 Albert III and John II allowed the Hamburg and other seafaring merchants to build a fortified tower, named the new work (Neuwerk). Right after work commenced on a 35-metre-high (115 ft) watchtower that could act as a daymark; the tower was completed in 1310. After its completion, an alderman and ten men-at-arms seized the tower. The oldest existing document that mentions Neuwerk is a Frisian contract of 1316. This document uses the island's old name of Nige O.

The current tower dates to 1367, 1369, or 1377 (accounts vary), built after a fire destroyed its wooden predecessor. The tower is Hamburg's oldest existing building as well as the last remainder of Hamburg's fortifications.

In 1648 the tower received a beacon fire that was lit at night. The tower was converted into a lighthouse in 1814. Still, the island was the site of numerous shipwrecks.

During World War I, a shell destroyed the beacon and its signalling apparatus. On 3 September 1915 lightning struck the Zeppelin LZ 40 (L 10), causing it to crash into the North Sea near Neuwerk, with the loss of the entire 20-man crew.

Due to the Greater Hamburg Law Neuwerk became part of Prussia in 1937, and thus after World War II it became part of the new state of Lower Saxony.

In 1946 an 18 kW wind turbine, 15 metres (49 ft) in diameter, installed to economize on diesel fuel, helped power the lighthouse and residences on the island. This installation ran for around 20 years before a submarine cable to the mainland replaced it.

In 1969 Neuwerk and Scharhörn were transferred back from Lower Saxony to Hamburg; in exchange, Hamburg waived its remaining rights to the harbour estate in Cuxhaven.

== Shipwrecks ==
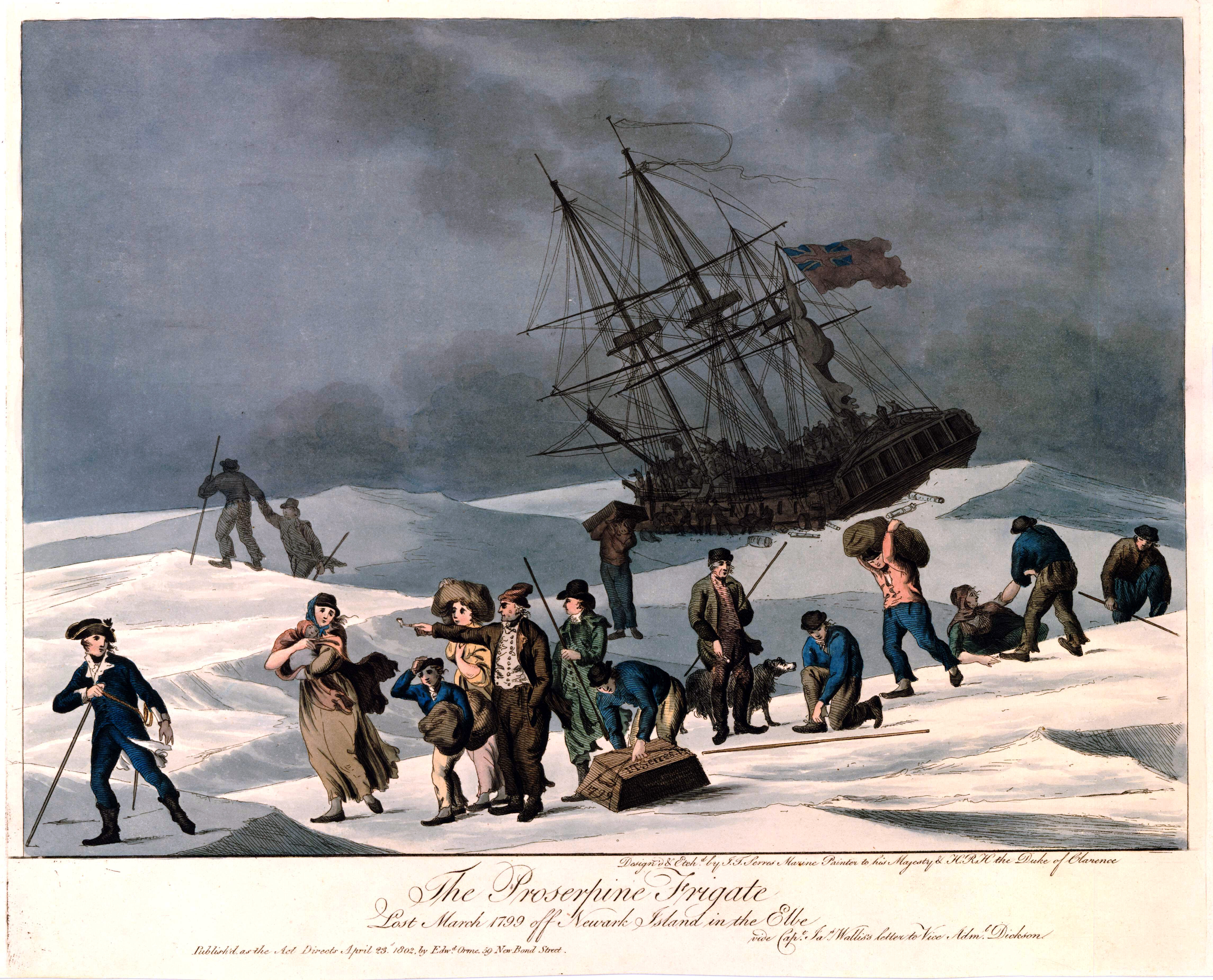
Escape from HMS Proserpine to Neuwerk (1799)

Shipwrecks near Neuwerk (see also near Scharhörn)
Date	Vessel and description
1 February 1799	HMS Proserpine stranded in thick ice and snow on the Scharhörn Reef, about 6 miles from Neuwerk. Among the 187 crew and passengers was the British envoy Thomas Grenville, on a diplomatic mission to Berlin via Cuxhaven. Fourteen people died during the escape from the wreck over the Wadden Sea and ice to Neuwerk. In a repeated attempt to retrieve bread from the vessel a few days later a small party of five got trapped aboard the crushed remains of the frigate and floated back to the open sea. Thirty-six hours later Proserpine stranded again near Baltrum Island, where they reached safety again; the wreck remained.
25 November 1817	Scots Craig was wrecked in the North Sea off Neuwerk with the loss of a crew member.
4 February 1819	George ran aground off Neuwerk. She was on a voyage from Hamburg to Hull, Yorkshire. (Neuwerk, Schleswig?)
23 July 1820	Cynthia was driven ashore
5 December 1821	Ann and/or Manchester was driven ashore and wrecked
10 December 1823	London was wrecked on Neuwerk. Her crew were rescued.
18 March 1827	George (Corrna) was lost
22 February 1827	Apollo and Charlotte ran aground. They were sailing from Sunderland, County Durham, to Hamburg.
9 November 1827	Egir was stranded between Neuwerk and Duhnen
16 October 1829	Shubenacadie capsized
18 November 1831	Union foundered off Neuwerk. Six of her crew were rescued.
16 June 1833	Frau Christine was driven ashore.
14 December 1932	Hosianna caught fire and sank in the North Sea off Neuwerk
18 July 1989	120 barrels of toxic Epichlorohydrin spilled onboard of Oostzee off Neuwerk, 17 died years later of cancer

== Demographics ==
On 31 December 2007, Neuwerk quarter had 39 inhabitants, 26 female and 13 males. 11 were resident aliens.
