= List of shipwrecks in 1822 =

The list of shipwrecks in 1822 includes ships sunk, foundered, wrecked, grounded, or otherwise lost during 1822.

table of contents
← 1821 / 1822 / 1823 →
Jan	Feb	Mar	Apr
May	Jun	Jul	Aug
Sep	Oct	Nov	Dec
Unknown date

== Unknown date ==
List of shipwrecks: Unknown date in 1822
Ship	State	Description
Actif	France	The ship was wrecked near Nuevitas, Cuba. She was on a voyage from Havana, Cuba to Havre de Grâce, Seine-Inférieure.
Alfred	France	The ship was lost at Martinique.
Amitié	France	The ship was lost at Jamaica. She was on a voyage from Cartagena, Gran Colombia to Bordeaux, Gironde.
Ann	United Kingdom	The ship was driven ashore at Tunis and was abandoned. She was on a voyage from Malta to an English port.
British Queen	United Kingdom	The whaler was lost in the Davis Straits before 2 August.
Catherine Jane	United States	The ship was wrecked east of Veracruz, Mexico.
Ceres	United Kingdom	The ship was lost at Tonomia in the Tongan Islands at Hapaee, or Lifuka, in late 1822.
Columbo (or Colombo)	United Kingdom	The ship was driven ashore at Point de Galle. She was declared a total loss. Columbo was on a voyage from Colombo to Mauritius and London.
Constance	Netherlands	The ship was wrecked on Rodrigues, Mauritius.
Constitution	United States	The schooner was captured by pirates 30 nautical miles (56 km) off Trinidad and was set afire. She was on a voyage from Boston, Massachusetts to Trinidad.
Cornwallis	United Kingdom	During a voyage from Calcutta to Mauritius, the ship spoke to another vessel in the Indian Ocean south of the equator on or about 18 February. She was never seen or heard from again.
HMS Drake	Royal Navy	The Cherokee-class brig-sloop was wrecked at Cape Race, Newfoundland, British North America.
Hero	United States	The ship was abandoned in the Atlantic Ocean.
Herring	United Kingdom	The ship was lost in St. Mary's Bay, Newfoundland. She was on a voyage from Quebec City, Lower Canada, British North America to Greenock. Renfrewshire.
Herselia	United States	The brig was captured by pirates. She was taken in to Arica, Chile where she was burnt.
Hope	United Kingdom	The ship sank at Buenos Aires, Argentina.
King George	United Kingdom	The whaler presumed to have foundered with the loss of all hands.
Lady Jane	United Kingdom	The whaler was lost in the Davis Straits.
Little Mary	(United Kingdom of Great Britain and Ireland) New South Wales	The ship departed Hobart, Van Diemen's Land for Port Dalrymple between August and October. No further tracer, presumed foundered with the loss of all hands.
Lord Castleragh	British East India Company	The East Indiaman was wrecked on the coast of Ceylon. All on board were rescued.
Lorenzo	United States	The ship was wrecked on the coast of Peru.
Maria	United Kingdom	The ship was lost off "Conceição", Chile. She was on a voyage from Buenos Aires, Argentina to Valparaíso, Chile.
Marian	Russia	The ship was wrecked near Reval between 23 September and 5 October. She was on a voyage from Saint Petersburg to Reval.
Merrimack	United States	The ship was wrecked in the Turks Islands. Her crew were rescued. She was on a voyage from Newburyport, Massachusetts to Port-au-Prince, Haiti.
Neptune	United Kingdom	The ship was wrecked on the Florida Keys. She was on a voyage from Jamaica to Dublin.
Ocean	United States	The brig was captured by pirates. She was taken in to Arica where she was burnt.
October	United Kingdom	The ship was presumed to have foundered in the Atlantic Ocean with the loss off all hands before 3 December, She was on a voyage from Falmouth, Cornwall to Halifax, Nova Scotia, British North America.
Phœbe	United Kingdom	The ship foundered in the Atlantic Ocean with some loss of life. She was on a voyage from Liverpool, Lancashire to St. Andrews, New Brunswick, British North America.
Retrieve	United Kingdom	The ship was driven ashore and wrecked at Maranhão, Brazil. Her crew were rescued.
Thetis	United Kingdom	The ship was lost near La Guaira, Venezuela.
Twins	United Kingdom	The ship was dismasted and abandoned in the Gulf of Saint Lawrence. She was on a voyage from Sunderland, County Durham to Quebec City.
Venus	United Kingdom	The schooner was wrecked in Foulah Bay, Africa.
