= List of shipwrecks in 1932 =

The list of shipwrecks in 1932 includes ships sunk, foundered, grounded, or otherwise lost during 1932.

table of contents
1932
Jan	Feb	Mar	Apr
May	Jun	Jul	Aug
Sep	Oct	Nov	Dec
Unknown date

== January ==
=== 1 January ===
List of shipwrecks: 1 January 1932
Ship	State	Description
Minas	Greece	The cargo ship ran aground on Fleves. The crew abandoned ship.

=== 2 January ===
List of shipwrecks: 2 January 1932
Ship	State	Description
Eirini Kyriakades	Greece	The cargo ship ran aground in the Paraná River, Argentina. She was refloated on 15 January.
Raylight	United Kingdom	The cargo ship ran aground at Ayr. She was refloated on 6 January.
Tamaho Maru	Japan	The cargo ship was abandoned in the Pacific Ocean (49°30′N 179°30′W). She was sighted at approximately that position on 19 January and a salvage operation was instigated. No trace of the vessel was found and she was presumed to have foundered.

=== 4 January ===
List of shipwrecks: 4 January 1932
Ship	State	Description
Teresa Schiaffino	Italy	The cargo ship ran aground at the eastern entrance to the Corinth Canal. She was refloated on 10 January.

=== 5 January ===
List of shipwrecks: 5 January 1932
Ship	State	Description
Kaala	United States	The ferry ran aground on Molokai, Hawaii. She was declared a constructive total loss.

=== 6 January ===
List of shipwrecks: 6 January 1932
Ship	State	Description
Cader Idris	United Kingdom	The Thames barge sank in the Thames Estuary 2 nautical miles (3.7 km) west of Southend Pier, Essex.
Sorriso	Italy	The cargo ship ran aground at Porto Santo Stefano, Tuscany. She was refloated on 22 January.
Stanley Margetts	United Kingdom	The Thames barge sank in the Thames Estuary 2 nautical miles (3.7 km) west of Southend Pier.

=== 7 January ===
List of shipwrecks: 7 January 1932
Ship	State	Description
Breeze	United Kingdom	The ship ran aground at Christchurch, New Zealand. She was refloated but declared a constructive total loss.

=== 8 January ===
List of shipwrecks: 8 January 1932
Ship	State	Description
Theseus	Greece	The cargo ship ran aground at Kara Point, Greece. She was refloated on 17 January.

=== 10 January ===
List of shipwrecks: 10 January 1932
Ship	State	Description
Mango	United Kingdom	The cargo ship was driven ashore at Selsey Bill, Sussex. All nine crew were rescued by the Selsey Lifeboat. She was refloated on 25 January.
Vicuna	United Kingdom	The Thames barge sank in the North Sea off Reculver, Kent. All three crew were rescued by the Margate Lifeboat.

=== 11 January ===
List of shipwrecks: 11 January 1932
Ship	State	Description
I. Ping	United States	The cargo ship ran aground on the Mopanshin Rocks, East China Sea and capsized. She was refloated on 24 February.
Prionus	Greece	The cargo ship ran aground at Tenedos, Turkey. She was refloated on 19 January.

=== 12 January ===
List of shipwrecks: 12 January 1932
Ship	State	Description
Rubis	France	The auxiliary schooner was wrecked at Europa Point, Gibraltar. The crew were rescued.
Silva	Sweden	The cargo ship sprang a leak and was beached at Grenå, Denmark.

=== 14 January ===
List of shipwrecks: 14 January 1932
Ship	State	Description
Camlough	United Kingdom	The cargo ship ran aground in Luce Bay, Wigtownshire and sank. Eight survivors were rescued by the Portpatrick Lifeboat.

=== 15 January ===
List of shipwrecks: 15 January 1932
Ship	State	Description
Conqueror	United Kingdom	The Thames barge sprang a leak and was abandoned in the Thames Estuary 1 nautical mile (1.9 km) west of Southend Pier, Essex. Both crew were rescued by the Southend Lifeboat.
Kowa Maru	Japan	The cargo ship ran aground in the South China Sea off Balabac Island, Philippines. The crew were taken off by Victoria Maru (Japan) on 18 January.
Svanur	Iceland	The auxiliary sailing vessel came ashore at Snæfellsnes. She was a total loss.

=== 19 January ===
List of shipwrecks: 19 January 1932
Ship	State	Description
Evergunar	Latvia	The cargo ship lost her tow and was driven ashore at Somnes, Nord-Trøndelag, Norway with the loss of four crew. Survivors were rescued by Jason (Norway). Evergunar was a total loss.

=== 20 January ===
List of shipwrecks: 20 January 1932
Ship	State	Description
Notre Dame de Chatelet	France	The auxiliary schooner sank at Saint-Servan, Ille-et-Vilaine.

=== 21 January ===
List of shipwrecks: 21 January 1932
Ship	State	Description
Glenaan	United Kingdom	The cargo ship ran aground on the Isle of Arran, Ayrshire. All ten crew survived.
Maryolio V. Polemis	Greece	The cargo ship struck a rock and was beached at Vatika. She was refloated on 5 February.
Mary	Denmark	The auxiliary schooner collided with Kong Ring (Norway) at Hamburg, Germany and sank. The crew were rescued.
Nikos Marcou	Denmark	The cargo ship ran aground in the Little Belt. She was refloated on 25 January.
Yu Chang	Republic of China Navy	The destroyer was wrecked at Nantung Chao, China. Her wreck was salvaged and scrapped.

=== 22 January ===
List of shipwrecks: 22 January 1932
Ship	State	Description
HMS Rainbow	Royal Navy	The Rainbow-class submarine ran aground in the English Channel off Ventnor, Isle of Wight. She was refloated later that day.

=== 23 January ===
List of shipwrecks: 23 January 1932
Ship	State	Description
Hazel B No. 2	United States	While out of the water on a slipway for the winter at Wrangell, Territory of Alaska, the 135-gross register ton motor vessel was destroyed by fire.
Mildred Adams	United Kingdom	The auxiliary schooner sank in the Atlantic Ocean off the Cape Verde Islands, Portugal. The crew were rescued.

=== 26 January ===
List of shipwrecks: 26 January 1932
Ship	State	Description
HMS M2	Royal Navy	The M-class submarine sank in West Bay, Dorset (50°34′36″N 2°33′56″W) with the loss of all 60 crew.
Wanda	Greece	The cargo ship ran aground on Euboea. She was refloated on 30 January.

=== 27 January ===
List of shipwrecks: 27 January 1932
Ship	State	Description
Venustas	Italy	The cargo ship ran aground at Kerch, Soviet Union. She was refloated on 12 February.
Sea Lion II	United States	An hour after striking a submerged object and beginning to flood during a voyage from Foggy Bay to Ketchikan, Territory of Alaska, the 18-gross register ton, 43.8-foot (13.4 m) fishing vessel sank off Point Alava (55°11′30″N 131°11′00″W) in Southeast Alaska. Her owner and captain, who was the only person aboard, abandoned ship in a skiff and survived.

=== 28 January ===
List of shipwrecks: 28 January 1932
Ship	State	Description
Wiltshire	United Kingdom	The Thames barge collided with the Thames barge Valkyrie in the River Thames at Southwark and was beached. She was refloated later that day.

=== 29 January ===
List of shipwrecks: 29 January 1932
Ship	State	Description
Cotabato	United States	The cargo ship came ashore on the east coast of Samar, Philippines and was a total loss.
Santa Ursula	Spain	The coaster caught fire 3 nautical miles (5.6 km) off Fuencaliente de La Palma, Canary Islands and was abandoned by her crew. She was towed to Tazacorte by San Miguel ( Spain) but subsequently sank.

=== 30 January ===
List of shipwrecks: 30 January 1932
Ship	State	Description
President Roosevelt	United States	The ocean liner was rammed by Roma (Italy) at New York and was severely damaged.

== February ==
=== 3 February ===
List of shipwrecks: 3 February 1932
Ship	State	Description
Endicott	United States	The cargo ship ran aground in the Dry Tortugas. She was refloated on 6 February.

=== 4 February ===
List of shipwrecks: 4 February 1932
Ship	State	Description
Lakewood	United States	The 9-gross register ton motor vessel was destroyed by an explosion and fire caused by a leaking gasoline tank while she was at her moorings in Thomas Basin at Ketchikan, Territory of Alaska. The only person aboard survived.

=== 5 February ===
List of shipwrecks: 5 February 1932
Ship	State	Description
Antartico	Chile	The cargo ship collided with Yero Carras (Chile) off Magallanes and sank. The crew were rescued.
Eleanor Nickerson	United States	The schooner collided with Jean Jadot (Belgium) in the Atlantic Ocean (43°05′N 63°45′W) and sank with the loss of 21 of her 27 crew. Survivors were rescued by Jean Jadot.
Ingerid	United Kingdom	The coaster was sunk at Saint-Denis, Réunion in a cyclone.
John Bayly	United Kingdom	The Thames barge collided with Specialist (United Kingdom) in the River Thames at Blackwall, London and sank. All three crew were rescued. She was refloated the next day.
Larnie B. Shaw	United States	The tug foundered in the Atlantic Ocean off Cape May, New Jersey with the loss of seven crew.
Linaria	United Kingdom	The cargo ship was driven ashore at Saint-Denis, Réunion in a cyclone. She was refloated on 10 February.

=== 6 February ===
List of shipwrecks: 6 February 1932
Ship	State	Description
Ginzan Maru	Japan	The coaster sank at Hakodate.
Kostis	Greece	The cargo ship was driven ashore at Kerch, Soviet Union. She was abandoned on 11 February as a total loss.

=== 8 February ===
List of shipwrecks: 8 February 1932
Ship	State	Description
USS Whipple	United States Navy	The Clemson-class destroyer collided with Rosalie Moller (United Kingdom) in the Yangtze at Shanghai, China and was severely damaged.

=== 10 February ===
List of shipwrecks: 10 February 1932
Ship	State	Description
E. Rose	United Kingdom	The cargo ship was driven ashore at Goodrington, Devon. She was refloated on 23 February.

=== 11 February ===
List of shipwrecks: 11 February 1932
Ship	State	Description
Pytheas	Greece	The cargo ship came ashore 9 nautical miles (17 km) north west of Eupatoria Point, Soviet Union. She was refloated on 24 March.

=== 12 February ===
List of shipwrecks: 12 February 1932
Ship	State	Description
Olivia	Venezuela	The cargo ship foundered in the Caribbean Sea with the loss of all but one of her crew.

=== 14 February ===
List of shipwrecks: 14 February 1932
Ship	State	Description
Hayo Maru	Japan	The cargo ship ran aground 16 nautical miles (30 km) north of Bunbury, Western Australia. She was refloated on 22 February.
Isleworth	United Kingdom	The cargo ship ran aground at Cape Maleas, Greece. She was refloated on 22 February.
Mary L	United States	While at anchor in the harbor at Wrangell, Territory of Alaska, in a strong wind with no one aboard, the 8-gross register ton motor vessel dragged her anchor and was blown ashore on the coast of Southeast Alaska within 0.5 miles (0.8 km) of Wrangell. She then broke up in the surf.

=== 15 February ===
List of shipwrecks: 15 February 1932
Ship	State	Description
Evanghelos Nomikos	Greece	The cargo ship struck rocks at Iğneada, Turkey and was beached. She was refloated later that day.
Italia	Sweden	The cargo ship ran aground off Gandia, Valencia, Spain. She was refloated on 13 April.

=== 16 February ===
List of shipwrecks: 16 February 1932
Ship	State	Description
Sakaye Maru	Japan	The cargo ship ran aground at Wakkanai, Hokkaidō. She was refloated on 23 February.

=== 18 February ===
List of shipwrecks: 18 February 1932
Ship	State	Description
Seestern	Germany	The auxiliary sailing vessel collided with Ethiopian (United Kingdom) in the Weser and was beached. The crew were rescued.

=== 20 February ===
List of shipwrecks: 20 February 1932
Ship	State	Description
Titan	flag unknown	The dredger capsized and sank in the Atlantic Ocean (35°39′N 8°29′W). The crew were rescued by Schelde (Netherlands).

=== 21 February ===
List of shipwrecks: 21 February 1932
Ship	State	Description
America First	United States	During a voyage from Taku Harbor in Southeast Alaska to Juneau, Territory of Alaska, the 36-gross register ton motor vessel was destroyed by fire 0.5 nautical miles (0.9 km; 0.6 mi) outside Stockade Point (58°03′30″N 134°01′45″W) in Stephens Passage in the Alexander Archipelago. Her crew of three abandoned ship in a small boat and was rescued by the vessel Moira (United States).
Mary Jones	United Kingdom	The three-masted auxiliary schooner foundered in the North Sea off the Essex coast. The crew were rescued by Foam Queen (United Kingdom).

=== 22 February ===
List of shipwrecks: 22 February 1932
Ship	State	Description
Northern Firth	United Kingdom	The coaster ran aground on Brush Island, New South Wales, Australia and was wrecked. The crew were rescued. She broke up in March and was a total loss.

=== 23 February ===
List of shipwrecks: 23 February 1932
Ship	State	Description
Cecil	United Kingdom	The Thames barge collided with Lady Martin (United Kingdom) in the River Thames at Shadwell and sank. She was raised the next day.

=== 24 February ===
List of shipwrecks: 24 February 1932
Ship	State	Description
Stylianos Coutsodontis	Greece	The cargo ship ran aground at Galata, Cyprus. She was refloated on 29 February.

=== 27 February ===
List of shipwrecks: 27 February 1932
Ship	State	Description
Seitoku Maru	Japan	The cargo ship came ashore at Amichishima, Miyagi Prefecture. She was refloated on 6 March.

=== 28 February ===
List of shipwrecks: 28 February 1932
Ship	State	Description
Castle Galleon	United Kingdom	The cargo ship came ashore at Hemsby, Norfolk. Eleven of her thirteen crew were taken off by rocket apparatus. The remaining two crew were taken off on 29 February.
George W. Elzey Jr.	United States	The schooner collided with USCGC Acushnet ( United States Coast Guard) in the Atlantic Ocean off the Cross Rip Lightship ( United States Coast Guard) and sank. The crew were rescued.

=== 29 February ===
List of shipwrecks: 29 February 1932
Ship	State	Description
Agnes Seed	United Kingdom	The tug suffered an explosion and sank at the Harrington Dock, Liverpool, Lancashire with the loss of one of her five crew. She was raised on 2 March and beached at Tranmere, Cheshire.
Trinidad Sanchez	Dominican Republic	The schooner collided with Emilia (United States) in the Atlantic Ocean off Arecibo, Puerto Rico and sank with the loss of one crew member.

== March ==
=== 1 March ===
List of shipwrecks: 1 March 1932
Ship	State	Description
Johsa	Norway	The cargo ship caught fire at Porsgrunn, Norway and was a total loss.
Yakumo Maru	Japan	The Imperial Japanese Army-chartered cargo ship collided with Kinryo Maru (Japan) at Moji-ku, Kitakyūshū and was beached. Refloated sometime in March, repaired and returned to service.

=== 2 March ===
List of shipwrecks: 2 March 1932
Ship	State	Description
Eusebia del Valle	Spain	The cargo ship collided with another vessel in the Atlantic Ocean and was abandoned by her crew, who were rescued by St Ambroise (France). Eusebia del Valle subsequently sank (approximately 47°55′N 6°17′W).
T.F.C.	United Kingdom	The Thames barge collided with Westland (Netherlands) in the River Thames at Gravesend, Kent and was beached.

=== 4 March ===
List of shipwrecks: 4 March 1932
Ship	State	Description
Ocklinge	United Kingdom	The cargo ship ran aground on The Manacles. She was declared a constructive total loss and salvage efforts were abandoned on 9 March.

=== 5 March ===
List of shipwrecks: 5 March 1931
Ship	State	Description
Deepwater	United States	The barge, towed by Mars (United States), was anchored in the Atlantic Ocean when Mars had difficulties and was never seen again. Lost with all five hands.

=== 6 March ===
List of shipwrecks: 6 March 1932
Ship	State	Description
Firelight	United Kingdom	The coaster collided with USCGC Eagle ( United States Coast Guard) in the Atlantic Ocean (40°53′N 70°55′W) and sank. All eight crew were rescued.
Spring	United States	The barge, towed by Lenape (United States), sprung a leak in a heavy Gale with thick snow and heavy seas south west of the McCries Shoals gas Light. Lenape cut her loose and went back to help her, but was unable to locate her in the snowstorm and she was never seen again. Lost with all four hands.

=== 7 March ===
List of shipwrecks: 7 March 1932
Ship	State	Description
Takasago Maru	Japan	The cargo ship struck a rock and foundered in the Yellow Sea off the west coast of Korea. All crew were rescued.
Verona	Norway	The cargo ship ran aground in Chesapeake Bay. She was refloated on 14 March.

=== 8 March ===
List of shipwrecks: 8 March 1932
Ship	State	Description
H. F de Bardeleben	United States	The collier lost her rudder in a storm in the Atlantic Ocean off Rhode Island. She was abandoned in the early hours of 10 March (39°36′N 58°55′W). All 34 crew were rescued by Laganbank (United Kingdom). She foundered later that day at 39°32′N 58°30′W.

=== 9 March ===
List of shipwrecks: 9 March 1932
Ship	State	Description
Latvis	Latvia	The cargo ship was damaged by ice 15 nautical miles (28 km) off Riga and was abandoned by her crew. She was later reboarded and was assisted into Riga by an icebreaker.

=== 12 March ===
List of shipwrecks: 12 March 1932
Ship	State	Description
Arthur Kunstmann	Germany	The cargo ship came ashore north of Florø, Norway (61°45′N 5°06′E). She was refloated on 17 March.
Reindeer I	United Kingdom	The salvage vessel sprang a leak in the Atlantic Ocean 50 nautical miles (93 km) south west of Halifax, Nova Scotia, Canada (43°43′N 63°00′W). She was abandoned by her 30 crew, who were rescued by Montcalm (United Kingdom).
Unidentified schooner barge	United States	The schooner barge sank in the North Atlantic Ocean south of Long Island, New York. An unidentified 300-to-330-foot (91.4 to 100.6 m) wreck in 95 feet (29 m) of water 16 nautical miles (30 km; 18 mi) southwest of Jones Inlet nicknamed "Asfalto" may be her.

=== 13 March ===
List of shipwrecks: 13 March 1932
Ship	State	Description
Prince David	United Kingdom	The passenger ship ran aground on a reef north of Bermuda. The passengers, and all except three crew, were taken off by Lady Somers (United Kingdom). She was refloated on 26 April.
Venezia	United Kingdom	The cargo ship collided with Sui-Tai (United Kingdom) at Hong Kong and was beached. She was refloated the next day and dry docked for repairs.

=== 14 March ===
List of shipwrecks: 14 March 1932
Ship	State	Description
Irene	Sweden	The cargo ship ran aground at Rørvik, Norway and was beached. She was refloated on 19 March.

=== 16 March ===
List of shipwrecks: 16 March 1932
Ship	State	Description
Gansfjord	Norway	The cargo ship ran aground 37 nautical miles (69 km) west of Puerto México, Veracruz, Mexico. She was refloated in April, arriving at Mobile, Alabama on 11 April.

=== 22 March ===
List of shipwrecks: 22 March 1932
Ship	State	Description
Leandros	Greece	The cargo ship ran aground in the Black Sea 15 nautical miles (28 km) east of the entrance to the Bosporus. She was refloated on 7 April.

=== 24 March ===
List of shipwrecks: 24 March 1932
Ship	State	Description
Eva	United Kingdom	The Thames barge collided with Fravis (United Kingdom) at Hayling Island, Hampshire and sank.

=== 25 March ===
List of shipwrecks: 25 March 1932
Ship	State	Description
Providence	France	The ocean liner ran aground at Cape Niger, Imbros, Turkey. She was refloated on 13 May.

=== 27 March ===
List of shipwrecks: 27 March 1932
Ship	State	Description
Rona	United Kingdom	The tug sank at Halifax, Nova Scotia, Canada.

=== 29 March ===
List of shipwrecks: 29 March 1932
Ship	State	Description
Rhea	Netherlands	The cargo ship ran aground between Gonaïves and Saint-Marc, Haiti. She was refloated on 1 April.

=== 30 March ===
List of shipwrecks: 30 March 1932
Ship	State	Description
Luna	United States	After the 19-gross register ton motor vessel caught fire due to an explosion that occurred when her crew lit her galley stove, her crew beached her on Osten Island (55°24′45″N 131°19′28″W) in Southeast Alaska, where she burned to the waterline, becoming a total loss. Her crew of two survived.

== April ==
=== 1 April ===
List of shipwrecks: 1 April 1932
Ship	State	Description
Salem	United States	The barge sank while being towed by Nassau (United States) off Brigantine, New Jersey in heavy seas and strong wind. Her captain and both crewmen left her in a lifeboat, but were never seen again.

=== 2 April ===
List of shipwrecks: 2 April 1932
Ship	State	Description
Cieszyn	Poland	The cargo ship ran aground at Utö, Finland. She was refloated on 6 April.

=== 3 April ===
List of shipwrecks: 3 April 1932
Ship	State	Description
Tahsien	flag unknown	The cargo ship ran aground on Alceste Rock, Cape Shautung, China. She was abandoned on 7 April as a total loss.

=== 6 April ===
List of shipwrecks: 6 April 1932
Ship	State	Description
Haiching	United Kingdom	The cargo ship struck rocks at White Dogs Island and was beached at Fuzhou, China.

=== 7 April ===
List of shipwrecks: 7 April 1932
Ship	State	Description
Chepstow Castle	United Kingdom	The cargo ship was driven ashore at Toward Point, Argyllshire. She was refloated on 20 April.
Sea Horse	United Kingdom	The tug collided with Foina (Norway) at Sunderland, Co Durham and sank. She was refloated on 9 April and drydocked for repairs.

=== 9 April ===
List of shipwrecks: 9 April 1932
Ship	State	Description
Rio Cabriel	Spain	The cargo ship was driven ashore at Pedrido, Galicia and was abandoned by her crew. She broke in two and was a total loss.
Rouzic	France	The three-masted schooner foundered in the Bay of Biscay (45°58′N 8°28′W). Of her 29 crew, four were rescued by Carmerata, four by Deerpool (both United Kingdom) and three by Samnanger (Norway). Eleven were rescued by Viking (Denmark) and an unknown number by Trsat (Yugoslavia).

=== 10 April ===
List of shipwrecks: 10 April 1932
Ship	State	Description
Galacum	United Kingdom	The cargo ship sprang a leak in the English Channel off St. Catherine's Point and was beached at Sandown, Isle of Wight. She was refloated the next day.

=== 11 April ===
List of shipwrecks: 11 April 1932
Ship	State	Description
City of Mukilteo	United States	The passenger ship caught fire and was beached on Whidbey Island, Washington. She was declared a constructive total loss.
Nobis	Germany	The cargo ship sprang a leak and sank in the North Sea off Ameland, Friesland, Netherlands. The crew were rescued.
Pentland Firth	United Kingdom	The coaster was driven ashore at Scrabster, Caithness. The crew were rescued by rocket apparatus.

=== 12 April ===
List of shipwrecks: 12 April 1932
Ship	State	Description
Daiboshi Maru No.3	Japan	The cargo ship sprang a leak and was beached at Horomushiro.

=== 13 April ===
List of shipwrecks: 13 April 1932
Ship	State	Description
Tsiehfa	flag unknown	The ship struck a rock and foundered in the Bohai Sea off Longkou, China. The crew were rescued.

=== 16 April ===
List of shipwrecks: 16 April 1932
Ship	State	Description
Louric	flag unknown	The cargo ship was driven ashore at Tela, Honduras and was wrecked.

=== 19 April ===
List of shipwrecks: 19 April 1932
Ship	State	Description
Maria M. Diacaki	Greece	The cargo ship ran aground on Syra and was abandoned by her crew. She later refloated herself and was taken in tow by Aghios Nicolaos (Greece) and beached again. She was refloated on 23 April.
Phoenix	United States	The tanker ran aground on the Bahama Banks. She was refloated on 23 April.
Selonija	Latvia	The cargo ship foundered in the Atlantic Ocean (41°56′N 9°31′W). All crew were rescued by Kulmerland (Germany).

=== 20 April ===
List of shipwrecks: 20 April 1932
Ship	State	Description
Hougomont	Finland	The barque was dismasted in a squall in the Southern Ocean 950 kilometres (590 miles) south of Cape Borda, South Australia. She made port at Semaphore, South Australia, on 8 May 1932 but was deemed beyond economical repair and was scuttled to form a breakwater at Stenhouse Bay, South Australia, on 8 January 1933.

=== 26 April ===
List of shipwrecks: 26 April 1932
Ship	State	Description
Sansei Maru	Japan	The cargo ship ran aground on the north shore of Sakhalin, Soviet Union. She was refloated on 6 May.
Sydfold	Norway	The cargo ship ran aground off the south shore of Prince Edward Island, Canada. She was refloated on 2 May.
Wheatfeed	United Kingdom	The coaster ran aground in the River Bann at Coleraine, County Antrim. She was refloated on 6 May.

=== 27 April ===
List of shipwrecks: 27 April 1932
Ship	State	Description
Cymbeline	United Kingdom	The tanker ran aground on Anticosti Island, Saint Lawrence River, Quebec, Canada. She was refloated on 2 May.

=== 28 April ===
List of shipwrecks: 28 April 1932
Ship	State	Description
L and H McDonald	United Kingdom	The schooner ran aground at Freshwater Point, Trepassey, Newfoundland and was a total loss.
Saisho Maru	Japan	The cargo ship ran aground on Kyushu (approximately 31°N 132°E). She was refloated on 2 May.

=== 29 April ===
List of shipwrecks: 29 April 1932
Ship	State	Description
Ikbal	Turkey	The cargo ship ran aground 20 nautical miles (37 km) east of Port Said, Egypt. She was refloated on 2 May.

=== 30 April ===
List of shipwrecks: 30 April 1932
Ship	State	Description
Laplace	United Kingdom	The cargo ship ran aground in the Paraná River at Punti Indio, Argentina. She was refloated on 5 May.

== May ==
=== 1 May ===
List of shipwrecks: 1 May 1932
Ship	State	Description
Grant T-300	United States	The small troller was found wrecked in Southeast Alaska northwest of Cape Spencer between Dixon Harbor (58.3494444°N 136.8575°W) and Icy Point (58.3922222°N 137.0888889°W). Human bones were found on a nearby beach.

=== 2 May ===
List of shipwrecks: 2 May 1932
Ship	State	Description
K Hadjipateras	Greece	The cargo ship ran aground at Ajaccio, Corsica, Italy (42°23′N 8°35′E). She was declared a total loss on 10 May.
Tyne Maru	Japan	The cargo ship collides with Kirin Maru (Japan) off Cape Shandong, China and sank.

=== 4 May ===
List of shipwrecks: 4 May 1932
Ship	State	Description
Haliartus	United Kingdom	The cargo ship ran aground at Bull Point, Falkland Islands and was wrecked.
Louise B. Marshall	United States	The motor schooner was abandoned 7 nautical miles (13 km) south of Cape Sable Island, Nova Scotia, Canada.

=== 5 May ===
List of shipwrecks: 5 May 1932
Ship	State	Description
Rainbow	United States	With no one and no cargo on board, the 8-gross register ton, 32-foot (9.8 m) motor towing vessel broke loose from her moorings during a gale and was wrecked on a rocky shore approximately 5.5 nautical miles (10.2 km; 6.3 mi) west of Totem Bay (56°28′N 133°23′W) on Kupreanof Island in the Alexander Archipelago in Southeast Alaska.

=== 7 May ===
List of shipwrecks: 7 May 1932
Ship	State	Description
Demetrios Pandelis	Greece	The cargo ship ran aground on Brava, Cape Verde Islands, Portugal. She was declared a total loss.
Juanito	Spain	The sailing ship sank at Burela, Lugo.
Mauritania	Spain	The schooner was rammed and sunk at Las Palmas, Canary Islands by Leon y Castillo ( Spain). The crew were rescued.
New York	United States	The passenger ship caught fire at West New Brighton, Staten Island, New York and was a total loss.

=== 8 May ===
List of shipwrecks: 8 May 1932
Ship	State	Description
Elim	United Kingdom	The coaster came ashore at Clents Point, Isle of Arran, Ayrshire. She capsized the next day and was a total loss.
Essex Friar	United Kingdom	ran aground on the Hillekrog Spit, Lolland, Denmark. Refloated on 14 May and taken to Copenhagen where declared a constructive total loss. Subsequently scrapped.

=== 11 May ===
List of shipwrecks: 11 May 1932
Ship	State	Description
Arez	France	The cargo ship struck a rock and foundered in the Bay of Biscay 1 nautical mile (1.9 km) off Ouessant, Finistère. The crew were rescued.
Berengaria	United Kingdom	The ocean liner ran aground in the Solent. She was refloated an hour later.

=== 12 May ===
List of shipwrecks: 12 May 1932
Ship	State	Description
Gauss	Germany	The cargo ship ran aground at the mouth of the Douro, Porto, Portugal. She was refloated on 3 June.

=== 14 May ===
List of shipwrecks: 14 May 1932
Ship	State	Description
Lochearn	United Kingdom	The coaster struck rocks off Tiree, Inner Hebrides and was beached. She was later refloated, repaired and returned to service.

=== 15 May ===
List of shipwrecks: 15 May 1932
Ship	State	Description
Georges Philippar	France	The ocean liner caught fire in Gulf of Aden on her maiden voyage. She sank on 19 May with the loss of 54 lives.
Roumelian	United Kingdom	The cargo liner collided with Saint Nazaire (France) in the English Channel 40 nautical miles (74 km) west of The Needles, Isle of Wight. She was beached at Thorness Bay where the four passengers were taken off. She was refloated in late May and towed to London for drydocking.

=== 16 May ===
List of shipwrecks: 16 May 1932
Ship	State	Description
Marianna	Greece	The cargo ship caught fire off Bender Eregli, Turkey and was beached. The crew were rescued by Kutlu (Turkey). She was a total loss.
Ventura	United States	A fire burned the 13-gross register ton 45.5-foot (13.9 m) motor vessel to the waterline, after which she sank in 144 feet (43.9 m) of water near Juneau, Territory of Alaska. Her crew of three survived, abandoned ship in a skiff, and was rescued by an outboard motorboat.

=== 19 May ===
List of shipwrecks: 19 May 1932
Ship	State	Description
Georges Philippar	France	The ocean liner sank with the loss of 54 lives due to damage she suffered when she caught fire on 15 May in Gulf of Aden on her maiden voyage.

=== 21 May ===
List of shipwrecks: 21 May 1932
Ship	State	Description
City of Charleroy	United Kingdom	The coaster ran aground at Exmouth, Devon. She was refloated on 27 May.

=== 22 May ===
List of shipwrecks: 22 May 1932
Ship	State	Description
Perseverance	United Kingdom	The schooner was driven ashore on Skomer, Pembrokeshire and was wrecked. The crew survived.

=== 23 May ===
List of shipwrecks: 23 May 1932
Ship	State	Description
Bombay Maru	Imperial Japanese Navy	The transport ship caught fire and was beached in the Astrea Channel, China.
Cormorant	Netherlands	The motor schooner sprang a leak and foundered in the English Channel 12 nautical miles (22 km) south west of Dungeness, Kent, United Kingdom. All four crew were rescued by a fishing vessel from Folkestone.

=== 25 May ===
List of shipwrecks: 25 May 1932
Ship	State	Description
Antonis	Greece	The cargo ship ran aground at Cape Maleas, Greece. She was refloated in mid-June, arriving at Piraeus on 11 June.
Canton	United Kingdom	The cargo ship ran aground in the Maldives. She was refloated on 30 May.
Glendevon	United Kingdom	The Thames barge sank in the River Thames at South Woolwich, London.
Varnes	United Kingdom	The Thames barge collided with Cambridge (United Kingdom) in the River Thames at Belvedere, Kent and sank.

=== 26 May ===
List of shipwrecks: 26 May 1932
Ship	State	Description
S. B. Hirtle	United Kingdom	The schooner sprang a leak in the Atlantic Ocean off Nova Scotia, Canada and was abandoned.

=== 27 May ===
List of shipwrecks: 27 May 1932
Ship	State	Description
Grecian	United States	The 2,827-gross register ton cargo ship collided at night in fog with the passenger ship City of Chattanooga (United States) in the Atlantic Ocean off the coast of Rhode Island and sank south-southeast of Block Island about 5 nautical miles (9.3 km; 5.8 mi) south of Southeast Point in 95 to 100 feet (29 to 30 m) of water at 41°05′N 71°31′W with the loss of three or four (sources disagree) crew members.
I. Ling	United States	The coaster struck rocks and foundered in the Yangtze 275 nautical miles (509 km) upstream from Yichang, China, with great loss of life.

== June ==
=== 1 June ===
List of shipwrecks: 1 June 1932
Ship	State	Description
Wan-Lui	United Kingdom	The cargo ship ran aground in the Yangtze 40 nautical miles (74 km) downstream of Chongqing, China. She was abandoned on 9 June.

=== 2 June ===
List of shipwrecks: 2 June 1932
Ship	State	Description
Caprera	Italy	The cargo ship came ashore on the Ilha da Mac, Argentina. She was refloated on 2 August.
Castle Galleon	United Kingdom	The coaster collided with Oscar Gorthon (Sweden) in the North Sea off the Corton Lightship (United Kingdom) and sank. The crew survived.

=== 7 June ===
List of shipwrecks: 7 June 1932
Ship	State	Description
Genzan Maru	Japan	The passenger ship ran aground off Karaginsky Island, Soviet Union and was abandoned by the 300-plus people on board. She sank the next day.

=== 8 June ===
List of shipwrecks: 8 June 1932
Ship	State	Description
Teide	Spain	The cargo liner was wrecked off Fernando Po, Spanish Guinea. Appin (United Kingdom) rescued 85 passengers and landed them on the island. She was a total loss.

=== 9 June ===
List of shipwrecks: 9 June 1932
Ship	State	Description
Choshu Maru	Japan	The cargo ship caught fire at Tsurumi and was beached. The crew abandoned ship. She was declared a total loss.

=== 10 June ===
List of shipwrecks: 10 June 1932
Ship	State	Description
Sappho	Greece	The cargo ship foundered off Berlengas, Portugal. The crew were rescued.

=== 13 June ===
List of shipwrecks: 13 June 1932
Ship	State	Description
Maria	Italy	The refrigerated cargo ship ran aground on the Frying Pan Shoals, North Carolina, United States. She was refloated on 16 June.
Shengking	United Kingdom	The passenger ship ran aground on Chiming Island, 15 nautical miles (28 km) east of Wei Hai Wei. Two British torpedo boat destroyers and an Admiralty tug rescued over 350 people. She was refloated on 17 June.

=== 14 June ===
List of shipwrecks: 14 June 1932
Ship	State	Description
Kumari	United Kingdom	The cargo ship foundered in the Indian Ocean off Dwarka, India. Six of her 33 crew were lost.

=== 15 June ===
List of shipwrecks: 15 June 1932
Ship	State	Description
Artemis	Greece	The cargo ship foundered in the Atlantic Ocean off the Abrolhos Rocks Bahia, Brazil. The crew were rescued by Eastern Prince (United Kingdom).

=== 17 June ===
List of shipwrecks: 17 June 1932
Ship	State	Description
Brazza	France	The cargo ship ran aground at Libreville, French Equatorial Africa. She was refloated on 23 June.
Cymbeline	United Kingdom	The tanker suffered an onboard explosion, caught fire and sank at Canadian Vickers' drydock in Montreal, Quebec, Canada. Twenty-five people were killed and 38 were injured. The ship was a total loss.
Ferndale	United Kingdom	The cargo ship ran aground on Dellys Rock, 50 nautical miles (93 km) east of Algiers, Algeria and broke in two. All 68 crew survived.
Olive	United States	While beached in a lagoon between Crooked Island and Near Island at Kodiak, Territory of Alaska, for painting, the 59-ton motor schooner was destroyed by a fire that apparently started when her gasoline engine backfired. The two crewmen aboard survived.

=== 23 June ===
List of shipwrecks: 23 June 1932
Ship	State	Description
Cote Nord	United Kingdom	The auxiliary schooner came ashore in Shoal Bay, Newfoundland and was a total loss.

=== 25 June ===
List of shipwrecks: 25 June 1932
Ship	State	Description
Firby	United Kingdom	The cargo ship came ashore in Bradore Bay, Strait of Belle Isle. She was refloated on 4 July.
Oyama Maru	Japan	The cargo ship ran aground on the south west coast of Korea, she refloated but was leaking and consequently beached. She was refloated the next day and sailed to Kure for repairs.

=== 27 June ===
List of shipwrecks: 27 June 1932
Ship	State	Description
Bore I	Finland	The passenger ship ran aground at Rysskar. The passengers were taken off. She was refloated the next day.

=== 29 June ===
List of shipwrecks: 29 June 1932
Ship	State	Description
Tanger	Germany	The cargo ship caught fire in the North Sea off the Elbe 3 Lightship (Germany) and was beached. She was refloated the next day.

== July ==
=== 1 July ===
List of shipwrecks: 1 July 1932
Ship	State	Description
Melbourne	United Kingdom	The four-masted barque collided with Seminole (United Kingdom) in the Atlantic Ocean off the Fastnet Rock and sank. The crew were rescued by Seminole.

=== 2 July ===
List of shipwrecks: 2 July 1932
Ship	State	Description
Eftychia	Greece	The cargo ship ran aground at Cape San Vito, Sicily, Italy. She was refloated on 24 July.

=== 6 July ===
List of shipwrecks: 6 July 1932
Ship	State	Description
Chosun Maru	Japan	The passenger ship struck a rock and was beached on the Shandong Peninsula, near Chisato Island, 60 miles (97 km) south of Qingdao, China (36°15′N 121°23′E). Kuma (Imperial Japanese Navy) took off 50 passengers and 131 crew. Chosun Maru was pulled off by Nasu Maru (Japan) and towed to Nagasaki for repairs. Repaired and returned to service in December.
Kittawa	United Kingdom	The cargo ship collided with Bhutan and Chengtu (both United Kingdom) in the Astrea Channel and sank.
Yu Chang	Republic of China Navy	The Fu Po-class destroyer was wrecked in the Nantung Chao Channel at the mouth of the Yangtze.

=== 7 July ===
List of shipwrecks: 7 July 1932
Ship	State	Description
Prométhée	French Navy	The Redoutable-class submarine foundered in the English Channel 7 nautical miles (13 km) north of Fermanville, Manche (49°48′31″N 1°26′42″W) with the loss of all 62 crew.

=== 8 July ===
List of shipwrecks: 8 July 1932
Ship	State	Description
Yaye Maru	Japan	The coaster sank off Tsushima.

=== 9 July ===
List of shipwrecks: 9 July 1932
Ship	State	Description
Mary Evelyn	United Kingdom	The 84.3-foot (25.7 m), 90-ton steam trawler was run down and sunk in thick fog while trawling by Skerries (United Kingdom) in the Bristol Channel between Lundy and Caldey Island. Five crew were rescued, four were reported missing.

=== 10 July ===
List of shipwrecks: 10 July 1932
Ship	State	Description
Casino	United Kingdom	The coaster grounded at Apollo Bay, Victoria, Australia. She refloated but capsized and sank with the loss of ten of her seventeen crew.
Triglav	Yugoslavia	The cargo ship ran aground at Fogo, Cape Verde Islands, Portugal. She was refloated on 21 July.

=== 11 July ===
List of shipwrecks: 11 July 1932
Ship	State	Description
Blas de Lezo	Spanish Navy	The Blas de Lezo-class cruiser ran aground off Cape Finisterre. She was refloated and taken in tow by the tug Argos (Spain) but foundered 7 nautical miles (13 km) offshore. All 346 crew were rescued.

=== 13 July ===
List of shipwrecks: 13 July 1932
Ship	State	Description
Michael N. Maris	Greece	The cargo ship struck a rock and foundered in the Adriatic Sea off Brusnik Island, Yugoslavia.

=== 15 July ===
List of shipwrecks: 15 July 1932
Ship	State	Description
Gishu Maru	Japan	The cargo ship ran aground in the Bungo Channel and was beached.
Moldanger	Norway	The almost-completed refrigerated cargo ship caught fire at Amsterdam, North Holland, Netherlands and sank. She was later refloated, repaired and entered service in March 1933.

=== 16 July ===
List of shipwrecks: 16 July 1932
Ship	State	Description
Kumakata Maru	Japan	The cargo ship caught fire off Keelung Islet, Formosa and was abandoned by her crew. She sank on 18 July.

=== 17 July ===
List of shipwrecks: 17 July 1932
Ship	State	Description
Norham	United Kingdom	The coaster ran aground at Redcar, Yorkshire. She was refloated on 2 August.

=== 20 July ===
List of shipwrecks: 20 July 1932
Ship	State	Description
Shunka Maru	Japan	The cargo ship capsized and sank off the coast of Korea.

=== 21 July ===
List of shipwrecks: 21 July 1932
Ship	State	Description
Beikoku Maru	Japan	The cargo ship collided with Yoshu Maru (Japan) in the Inland Sea of Japan and sank. All crew were rescued.

=== 22 July ===
List of shipwrecks: 22 July 1932
Ship	State	Description
Johanna Smith	United States	The schooner, serving as a gambling ship moored off Long Beach, California, burned and sank.

=== 23 July ===
List of shipwrecks: 23 July 1932
Ship	State	Description
Heiwa Maru	Japan	The cargo ship struck a rock and foundered off Mokoo.
Islander	United Kingdom	The passenger ship ran aground off Aywick, Shetland Islands and was a total loss. All on board were rescued.

=== 25 July ===
List of shipwrecks: 25 July 1932
Ship	State	Description
Cristina	Spain	The cargo ship ran aground at Kerkennah, Turkey (34°42′00″N 11°21′30″E). She was refloated on 29 July.

=== 26 July ===
List of shipwrecks: 26 July 1932
Ship	State	Description
Homestead	United Kingdom	The cargo ship foundered in the Atlantic Ocean at Humber Arm, Newfoundland.
Lettie M. Hardy	United Kingdom	The schooner collided with Facto (Norway) in the Atlantic Ocean 100 nautical miles (190 km) off Georgetown, British Guiana and sank. All on board were rescued.
Niobe	Reichsmarine	The three-masted barque capsized and sank in the Baltic Sea off Fehmarn, Schleswig-Holstein with the loss of 69 of her 109 crew. Survivors were rescued by Theresia L M Russ (Germany). Raised on 21 August for recovery of the dead, Niobe was scuttled on 18 September 1933.
Renate	Germany	The cargo ship struck a submerged object in the Baltic Sea and sank off Gotland, Sweden. The crew survived.

=== 29 July ===
List of shipwrecks: 29 July 1932
Ship	State	Description
Cape Race	United Kingdom	The schooner came ashore at St. Shotts, Newfoundland and was wrecked.
Euphorbia	United Kingdom	The cargo ship ran aground on the south coast of Anticosti Island, Saint Lawrence River, Quebec, Canada. She was refloated on 3 August.

== August ==
=== 3 August ===
List of shipwrecks: 3 August 1932
Ship	State	Description
Libby, McNeill & Libby No. 9	United States	The 14.12-net register ton scow was wrecked on Salamatof Beach in Cook Inlet on the south-central coast of the Territory of Alaska during a gale.

=== 4 August ===
List of shipwrecks: 4 August 1932
Ship	State	Description
Aso	Imperial Japanese Navy	The Bayan-class armored cruiser was sunk as a target by submarine torpedoes .
Bruges	Belgium	The cargo ship ran aground in the Paraná River upstream of Diamante, Entre Ríos, Argentina. She was refloated on 10 August.
Eunice	United States	During a voyage in the Aleutian Islands from Unalaska to Atka and way ports with a cargo of 30 short tons (27,216 kg) of general merchandise, the 42-gross register ton motor vessel went off course in fog due to a faulty compass and was wrecked on a beach on the east coast of Carlisle Island. Her crew of four survived.
Joan	United States	The 26-gross register ton, 44.5-foot (13.6 m) fishing vessel sank near Prince of Wales Island in the Alexander Archipelago in Southeast Alaska. All three people aboard survived.
Kelvinside	United Kingdom	The coaster sank about 5 nautical miles (9.3 km) west south west of the Mull of Galloway, Wigtownshire. The crew survived.
Why Not	United Kingdom	The Thames barge collided with Otranto (United Kingdom) in the Thames Estuary at Thameshaven, Essex, and sank.

=== 5 August ===
List of shipwrecks: 5 August 1932
Ship	State	Description
Antonchu	Spain	The cargo ship sprang a leak and foundered in the Atlantic Ocean 25 nautical miles (46 km) south west of Cape Santa María, Portugal (36°40′N 8°12′W). The crew were rescued by Bakap (Yugoslavia).
St Patrick	United Kingdom	The passenger ferry ran aground off La Corbière, Jersey, Channel Islands. The 314 passengers were rescued by Duke of Normandy, Isle of Sark and St Julien (all United Kingdom). She was later refloated and towed into Saint Helier for temporary repairs.

=== 6 August ===
List of shipwrecks: 6 August 1932
Ship	State	Description
Capable	United Kingdom	The steamer came ashore in thick fog at Thurlestone, South Devon during thick fog. Capable refloated on the high tide and continued her journey from Pentewan, Cornwall, with grit for London.
M.O.P. 216 B	Argentina	The tug foundered in the Paraná River at Rosario, Santa Fe with the loss of four crew.
Myrtle	United States	The 9-gross register ton motor vessel was wrecked 1 nautical mile (1.9 km; 1.2 mi) south of East Foreland (60°43′N 151°24′W), Territory of Alaska. The only person on board survived.

=== 7 August ===
List of shipwrecks: 7 August 1932
Ship	State	Description
Libby	United States	The 8-gross register ton motor vessel broke loose from her moorings on the Nushagak River near Ekuk. Territory of Alaska, during a storm with no one aboard and sank.

=== 8 August ===
List of shipwrecks: 8 August 1932
Ship	State	Description
Western World	United States	The passenger-cargo ship, carrying 166 crew members and 85 passengers, ran aground at Porto do Boi, Brazil. The passengers were taken off by the German ship General Osorio and landed at Rio de Janeiro. She was refloated on 10 September, and subsequently was repaired and returned to service.

=== 9 August ===
List of shipwrecks: 9 August 1932
Ship	State	Description
Dagny	Sweden	The auxiliary schooner came ashore at Lessoe. The crew were rescued. She was refloated on 13 August.

=== 12 August ===
List of shipwrecks: 12 August 1932
Ship	State	Description
Aéropostale II	France	The mail boat departed Dakar, French West Africa for Natal, Rio Grande do Norte, Brazil. She last reported her position in the Atlantic Ocean 250 nautical miles (460 km) out. No further trace, believed foundered with the loss of all 22 crew.

=== 13 August ===
List of shipwrecks: 13 August 1932
Ship	State	Description
Lassen	United States	The cargo ship caught fire at Oakland, California. She was scuttled to extinguish the fire. She was refloated on 17 August and found to be severely damaged.

=== 16 August ===
List of shipwrecks: 16 August 1932
Ship	State	Description
Nichifuku Maru	Japan	The cargo ship collided with Hide Maru (Japan) in the Inland Sea of Japan and sank with the loss of nineteen crew.

=== 18 August ===
List of shipwrecks: 18 August 1932
Ship	State	Description
Shoal Fisher	United Kingdom	The three-masted schooner collided with Telena (United Kingdom) in the Atlantic Ocean (48°00′N 7°50′W) and sank. The crew were rescued by Telena.

=== 20 August ===
List of shipwrecks: 20 August 1932
Ship	State	Description
Lincoln Rock	United States	The 9-gross register ton motor vessel was destroyed by fire in the harbor at Wrangell, Territory of Alaska. Her crew of five survived.

=== 22 August ===
List of shipwrecks: 22 August 1932
Ship	State	Description
Dagland	Norway	The cargo ship ran aground at Akbaş, Turkey. She was refloated on 28 August.
La Corvette	France	The schooner capsized in the English Channel 4.5 nautical miles (8.3 km) off Selsey Bill, Sussex, United Kingdom.
HMAS Yarra	Royal Australian Navy	The decommissioned River-class torpedo-boat destroyer was possibly sunk on this date as a target off Sydney.

=== 30 August ===
List of shipwrecks: 30 August 1932
Ship	State	Description
Kotohira Maru	Japan	The cargo ship ran aground off Shiranushi, Karafuto Prefecture, Japan. She was refloated on 3 September.

=== 31 August ===
List of shipwrecks: 31 August 1932
Ship	State	Description
Kumiai Maru	Japan	The coaster collided with Kurushima Maru (Japan) off Oshima Province and sank.

=== Unknown date ===
List of shipwrecks: Unknown date August 1932
Ship	State	Description
Duke of Lancaster	United Kingdom	The passenger ship ran aground on Great Copeland Island in the Copeland Islands in the Irish Sea in a fog . She was refloated and returned to service.

== September ==
=== 1 September ===
List of shipwrecks: 1 September 1932
Ship	State	Description
Stat	Norway	The cargo ship ran aground at Akranes, Iceland. She was refloated on 6 September.

=== 2 September ===
List of shipwrecks: 2 September 1932
Ship	State	Description
Sandra	Norway	The cargo ship ran aground at Kristiansand, Norway, and sank.

=== 3 September ===
List of shipwrecks: 3 September 1932
Ship	State	Description
Bertie E. Tull	United States	The cargo ship ran aground in the Delaware River at New Castle, Delaware and was a total loss.
Clara Elise	Germany	The schooner sank in the Baltic Sea off the Stockholm archipelago, Sweden with the loss of four of her eight crew.
Jelo	Norway	The cargo ship collided with Quersee (Germany) in the Kaiser Wilhelm Canal and was beached.

=== 6 September ===
List of shipwrecks: 6 September 1932
Ship	State	Description
Odensholm	Sweden	The cargo ship ran aground on Burnt Head, Newfoundland. She was declared a total loss on 15 September.

=== 7 September ===
List of shipwrecks: 7 September 1932
Ship	State	Description
Aranci	United Kingdom	The dredger foundered in the Irish Sea 22 nautical miles (41 km) south by west of the Tuskar Rock, Ireland. She was under tow at the time and unmanned.
Going	United States	The 7-gross register ton motor vessel was wrecked with the loss of one life on rocks on the westernmost island of the Tatoosh Islands in Southeast Alaska when she dragged her anchor during a gale. There were two survivors.

=== 9 September ===
List of shipwrecks: 9 September 1932
Ship	State	Description
Observation	United States	The passenger ferry exploded and sank in the East River off Rikers Island, New York with the loss of 37 lives.

=== 10 September ===
List of shipwrecks: 10 September 1932
Ship	State	Description
Admiral Dewey	United Kingdom	The schooner was driven ashore on Saint Pierre Island, Saint Pierre and Miquelon and was wrecked.
Clara F	United Kingdom	The schooner was driven ashore on Saint Pierre Island and was wrecked.
Golfer	United Kingdom	The coaster was driven ashore at Tiumpan Head, Isle of Lewis, Outer Hebrides and was abandoned.
Marjorie and Eileen	United Kingdom	The schooner was driven ashore on Saint Pierre Island and was wrecked.

=== 11 September ===
List of shipwrecks: 11 September 1932
Ship	State	Description
Watford	United Kingdom	The collier was driven ashore at Cape Percy, Nova Scotia, Canada and was wrecked with the loss of one of her 38 crew.

=== 12 September ===
List of shipwrecks: 12 September 1932
Ship	State	Description
Adele	Germany	The auxiliary sailing ship was abandoned in the Baltic Sea off Pillau, East Prussia, Germany. The crew were rescued by the Pillau Lifeboat. The ship came ashore at Pillau.
Ida	United States	A fire destroyed the 13-gross register ton, 32-foot (9.8 m) fishing vessel while she was moored at the Oil Dock at Kodiak, Territory of Alaska. The only person aboard survived.

=== 13 September ===
List of shipwrecks: 13 September 1932
Ship	State	Description
Baron Baeyens	Belgium	The cargo ship ran aground in the Paraná River at Arroyo Seco, Santa Fe, Argentina. She was refloated on 19 September.
Chloe	Italy	The cargo ship issued an SOS in the Bay of Biscay off Ouessant, Finistère, France. She was taken in tow by Seefalke (Germany), but her boilers exploded and she foundered at 48°20′N 5°09′W. All crew were rescued by Seefalke.
Glamorgan Coast	United Kingdom	The cargo ship came ashore at North Point, Cape Cornwall. Fourteen crew and the one passenger rowed to safety; the ship was a total loss.

=== 14 September ===
List of shipwrecks: 14 September 1932
Ship	State	Description
Ivanhoe	Norway	The cargo ship ran aground on the north shore of False Island in the Matung Channel. She was refloated on 24 September.
HMAS Penguin	Royal Australian Navy	The decommissioned depot ship was scuttled in the Tasman Sea off Bondi Beach, Sydney, Australia.
Savio	Italy	The cargo ship came ashore on Euboea, Greece (37°58′N 24°33′E) and was a total loss. The crew were rescued by Viking (Greece).

=== 17 September ===
List of shipwrecks: 17 September 1932
Ship	State	Description
Ravenscraig	Norway	The coaster collided with Baron Polwarth (United Kingdom) in the Thames Estuary off the Sunk Lightship (United Kingdom) and sank with the loss of two crew.

=== 21 September ===
List of shipwrecks: 21 September 1932
Ship	State	Description
Aequitas	Italy	The cargo ship ran aground at Kerch, Soviet Union. She was refloated around 7 October.
Tchatyr-Dahg	Soviet Union	The cargo ship collided with Inonu (Turkey) off Leander's Tower, Istanbul, Turkey and was beached. She was refloated on 29 September.

=== 23 September ===
List of shipwrecks: 23 September 1932
Ship	State	Description
Camille Mortenol	Netherlands	The dredger foundered in the Atlantic Ocean (44°00′N 8°55′W) whilst under tow by Ebro (Netherlands). Two of her crew were lost.
HMS Challenger	Royal Navy	The survey ship struck a rock 6 nautical miles (11 km) north of Ford's Harbour, Labrador, Dominion of Newfoundland (56°28′30″N 61°10′00″W), and was beached. She was later refloated.

=== 25 September ===
List of shipwrecks: 25 September 1932
Ship	State	Description
Success	United States	The 14-gross register ton, 45.6-foot (13.9 m) motor vessel was wrecked on a reef 0.5 nautical miles (0.93 km; 0.58 mi) southeast of Labouchere Island (56°17′35″N 133°40′20″W) in Southeast Alaska. Her two crewmen survived. The cutter USCGC Tallapoosa ( United States Coast Guard) searched for her wreck a week later but found no trace of it remaining.

=== 26 September ===
List of shipwrecks: 26 September 1932
Ship	State	Description
Marjorie E. Bachman	United Kingdom	The schooner foundered off the Change Islands, Dominion of Newfoundland. The crew survived.
Saelen	Denmark	The auxiliary schooner departed Upernivik for Godhavn. No further trace, presumed foundered with the loss of all hands.

=== 27 September ===
List of shipwrecks: 27 September 1932
Ship	State	Description
Bur	Sweden	The cargo ship ran aground in the River Dakoum, French West Africa. She was refloated around 5 October.
Nevada	United States	During a voyage from Longview, Washington, to Yokohama, Japan, with a crew of 37 and a cargo of 6,648 tons of lumber, flour, and general merchandise, the 5,645-gross register ton steamer was wrecked on Amatignak Island in the western Aleutian Islands with the loss of 34 lives. The passenger steamer President Madison (United States) arrived on the scene on 29 September and rescued her three survivors from the island.

=== 30 September ===
List of shipwrecks: 30 September 1932
Ship	State	Description
Nelson	United Kingdom	The training ship, a former Thames barge, sprang a leak and sank in the River Thames at Chelsea, London. She was refloated on 1 October.

== October ==
=== 1 October ===
List of shipwrecks: 1 October 1932
Ship	State	Description
Bright Fan	United Kingdom	The cargo ship struck an iceberg in the Hudson Strait and sank. All 30 crew were rescued by N.B. McLean (Canada).
Chusan	United Kingdom	The passenger ship ran aground at Weihaiwei, China. The passengers were taken off. She sank on 4 October.
Else	Finland	The cargo ship was driven ashore on Björkö and sank. Her crew were rescued.
Georgios	Greece	The cargo ship was driven ashore on Björkö. All 29 crew were rescued before she sank.
Niemen	Poland	The cargo ship collided with the barque Lawhill (Finland) in the Kattegat and sank. The crew were rescued by Kronprinsessan Margareta (Sweden).
Start	Sweden	The cargo ship was driven ashore or Björkö and sank. Her crew were rescued. She was refloated on 15 October.

=== 2 October ===
List of shipwrecks: 2 October 1932
Ship	State	Description
Mark H. Gray	United Kingdom	The schooner departed Porto, Portugal for Gaultois, Newfoundland. No further trace, presumed foundered in the Atlantic Ocean with the loss of all hands.

=== 3 October ===
List of shipwrecks: 3 October 1932
Ship	State	Description
Pasadena	United Kingdom	The 120-foot (37 m) trawler stranded off Glengad Head, County Donegal, Ireland. Declared a Constructive Total Loss in December.

=== 4 October ===
List of shipwrecks: 4 October 1932
Ship	State	Description
Beaconoil	United States	The tanker ran aground in the Houston Channel. She was refloated on 11 October.

=== 5 October ===
List of shipwrecks: 5 October 1932
Ship	State	Description
Franklin	United States	The coaster caught fire at Philadelphia, Pennsylvania and was burnt to the waterline.
John J. Boland Jr.	United Kingdom	The cargo ship foundered in Lake Erie 10 nautical miles (19 km) off Erie, Pennsylvania.
Sally B	United States	With three passengers and two crewmen on board, the 18-gross register ton, 39.7-foot (12.1 m) motor yacht dragged her anchor, grounded, turned on her side, and was destroyed by fire in Southeast Alaska at a location identified as "Caldera Bay," probably a reference to either Calder Bay or, more likely, Port Caldera (55°23′N 133°10′W). There was no loss of life.

=== 6 October ===
List of shipwrecks: 6 October 1932
Ship	State	Description
Agen	France	The cargo ship collided with Cap Arcona (Germany) in the North Sea off the Elbe 4 Lightship (Germany) and was beached. She was later refloated and escorted into Hamburg, Germany.
Johannes	Finland	The three-masted schooner foundered in the Baltic Sea off Viborg, Denmark. The eight crew were rescued by Asta (Germany).

=== 8 October ===
List of shipwrecks: 8 October 1932
Ship	State	Description
Shamrock	United Kingdom	The Thames barge was abandoned of Dungeness, Kent. The crew were rescued by the Dungeness Lifeboat. She was later reboarded and found to have suffered little damage.

=== 9 October ===
List of shipwrecks: 9 October 1932
Ship	State	Description
Charente	Norway	The cargo liner collided with Afric Star (United Kingdom) in the English Channel 7 nautical miles (13 km) east of Dungeness, Kent, United Kingdom and sank. all on board were rescued by Afric Star.

=== 10 October ===
List of shipwrecks: 10 October 1932
Ship	State	Description
Scheldestad	Belgium	The cargo ship was abandoned in the Bay of Biscay (45°30′N 8°00′W). The crew were rescued by Lancastria (United Kingdom). Sheldestad remained afloat and was towed by tugs Max Berendt and Seefalke (both Germany) to A Coruña, Spain where she was repaired. She returned to service on 12 October.

=== 11 October ===
List of shipwrecks: 11 October 1932
Ship	State	Description
HNLMS Krakatau	Royal Netherlands Navy	HNLMS Krakatau The Krakatau-class minelayer listed and sank off Soerabaja, Netherlands East Indies. Raised on 3 December 1932. The vessel was repaired and returned to service on 4 September 1934.

=== 13 October ===
List of shipwrecks: 13 October 1932
Ship	State	Description
Assel	Germany	The coaster capsized and sank off Nervi Island, Vyborg, Soviet Union with the loss of three of her five crew.
Emelia	Estonia	The schooner collided with Vesuvius (Sweden) off Flotjam, Sweden and sank.
Girl May	United Kingdom	The coaster foundered in the Irish Sea 7 nautical miles (13 km) south of Maughold Head, Isle of Man. The seven crew were rescued by the trawler Peter Lovett (United Kingdom).

=== 14 October ===
List of shipwrecks: 14 October 1932
Ship	State	Description
Braedale	United Kingdom	The coaster foundered in the English Channel 8 nautical miles (15 km) south west of The Needles, Isle of Wight. All eight crew survived.
Monte Nevoso	Italy	Monte Nevoso. The cargo ship ran aground on Haisbro' Sands, Norfolk, United Kingdom and was a total loss. The 33 crew were rescued by H F Bailey III ( Royal National Lifeboat Institution) and the fishing vessel Gleam (United Kingdom).
Sheldrake	United Kingdom	The coaster was abandoned in the North Sea off the coast of Lincolnshire. The crew were rescued by the pilot cutter J. H. Fisher. Sheldrake was driven ashore at Cleethorpes. She was refloated on 18 October.

=== 15 October ===
List of shipwrecks: 15 October 1932
Ship	State	Description
Redvers Buller	United Kingdom	The sand hopper capsized and sank in the Bristol Channel west of Flat Holm with the loss of four of her seven crew.

=== 17 October ===
List of shipwrecks: 17 October 1932
Ship	State	Description
Brulin	United Kingdom	The cargo ship ran aground at Kingston, Ontario, Canada. She was refloated on 20 October and found to be severely damaged.
L'Essor	France	The schooner foundered in the Irish Sea. The 48 crew were rescued by Redsea (United Kingdom).

=== 18 October ===
List of shipwrecks: 18 October 1932
Ship	State	Description
Birkenau	Germany	The cargo ship came ashore at Chapel Point, Fife, United Kingdom. The crew were rescued by rocket apparatus. She was refloated the next day and towed to Leith.
Faithful	United Kingdom	The coaster was driven ashore in Whiting Bay, Isle of Arran. All four crew were rescued.

=== 24 October ===
List of shipwrecks: 24 October 1932
Ship	State	Description
Miho Maru	Japan	The cargo ship ran aground on Sakhalin, Soviet Union. She was refloated on 4 November.

=== 25 October ===
List of shipwrecks: 25 October 1932
Ship	State	Description
Marjorie Henniga	United Kingdom	The schooner came ashore at Newtown, Newfoundland and was a total loss.

=== 28 October ===
List of shipwrecks: 28 October 1932
Ship	State	Description
Millom Castle	United Kingdom	The auxiliary schooner was abandoned in the English Channel 8 nautical miles (15 km) off Plymouth, Devon. The three crew were rescued by the Plymouth Lifeboat. Millom Castle was later towed into Plymouth by the trawler Atlantic (United Kingdom).
Rama	Nicaragua	The refrigerated cargo ship came ashore at Bluefields, Jamaica. She was declared a constructive total loss.

=== 29 October ===
List of shipwrecks: 29 October 1932
Ship	State	Description
New Hope	United Kingdom	The Thames barge foundered in the Thames Estuary. Both crew and a dog were rescued by the Southend Lifeboat.

=== 31 October ===
List of shipwrecks: 31 October 1932
Ship	State	Description
Pamela Hope	United Kingdom	The coaster came ashore on between Burnham Overy and Wells-next-the-Sea, Norfolk. The crew abandoned ship. She was refloated on 24 November.
Sarah Evans	United Kingdom	The schooner came ashore near Porthtowan, Cornwall and was a total loss. The three crew were rescued.
Spes	Netherlands	The cargo ship came ashore at Christiansø, Bornholm, Denmark. The crew were rescued.
Tovaristch Stalin	Soviet Union	The passenger ship ran aground 2 nautical miles (3.7 km) north of Kapp Linné, Spitsbergen, Norway. She was eventually refloated with the aid of six British trawlers.

== November ==
=== 2 November ===
List of shipwrecks: 2 November 1932
Ship	State	Description
Plaindealer	United Kingdom	The schooner was wrecked at Tub Harbour, Labrador, Canada.
Rosie Bella	United Kingdom	The schooner came ashore at Croe, Newfoundland and was wrecked.

=== 3 November ===
List of shipwrecks: 3 November 1932
Ship	State	Description
Ceres	Netherlands	The cargo ship ran aground at Panomi Point, Greece. She was refloated on 6 November.

=== 5 November ===
List of shipwrecks: 5 November 1932
Ship	State	Description
Carrouest I	France	The coaster foundered in the English Channel 2 nautical miles (3.7 km) south of Alderney, Channel Islands. All five crew survived.
Ralph Williams	United Kingdom	The schooner sprang a leak and was abandoned off Herring Neck, Newfoundland.

=== 6 November ===
List of shipwrecks: 6 November 1932
Ship	State	Description
Goulandris	Greece	The cargo ship foundered in the Mediterranean Sea south of Crete. The crew survived.
Orion	Finland	The cargo ship came ashore at Härnösand, Västernorrland County, Sweden and was wrecked.

=== 7 November ===
List of shipwrecks: 7 November 1932
Ship	State	Description
Helen Belle	United Kingdom	The schooner sprang a leak and sank off Cape Chapeau Rouge, Newfoundland.
Kenjo Maru	Japan	The cargo ship ran aground on the east coast of Sakhalin, Soviet Union. She was refloated on 10 November.

=== 8 November ===
List of shipwrecks: 8 November 1932
Ship	State	Description
Bessie McDonald	United Kingdom	The schooner came ashore at Old Perlican, Newfoundland and was wrecked.
Drake	United Kingdom	The Thames barge collided with Inga (Finland) in the River Medway at Upnor, Kent and sank.
Hester Nellie	United Kingdom	The schooner sprang a leak and sank off Red Island, Newfoundland.

=== 10 November ===
List of shipwrecks: 10 November 1932
Ship	State	Description
Alma M	United Kingdom	The cargo ship came ashore on Conception Island, Bahamas and was wrecked. The crew were rescued.

=== 11 November ===
List of shipwrecks: 11 November 1932
Ship	State	Description
Nordvangen	Norway	The cargo ship was driven ashore at Cay Confites, Cuba in a hurricane. Sne was refloated in mid-December, arriving at Key West, Florida, United States under tow on 13 December.
Sensan Maru	Japan	The cargo ship ran aground 5 nautical miles (9.3 km) east of Keelung, China. She was refloated on 17 November.
Vistula	Denmark	The tanker ran aground at Tampico, Mexico and was a total loss.

=== 12 November ===
List of shipwrecks: 12 November 1932
Ship	State	Description
Balboa	United Kingdom	The cargo ship sank at Georgetown, British Guiana.

=== 13 November ===
List of shipwrecks: 13 November 1932
Ship	State	Description
Oregon Star	United Kingdom	The refrigerated cargo liner caught fire at Hebburn, Northumberland. One crew member was killed. She burnt for a week and was consequently declared a total loss. Oregon Star was scrapped in 1934.

=== 14 November ===
List of shipwrecks: 14 November 1932
Ship	State	Description
Genchu Maru	Japan	The cargo ship ran aground on the Idzu Peninsula in a typhoon. She broke in two, the stern section sank with the loss of 36 crew. There were some survivors.
Pieter Corneliszoon Hooft	Netherlands	The ocean liner caught fire in Amsterdam harbour, North Holland. She burned for nine days and was consequently declared a total loss and sold for scrap.
Unkai Maru No.15	Japan	The cargo ship was driven ashore in Tokyo Bay in a typhoon. She was refloated on 23 November.

=== 18 November ===
List of shipwrecks: 18 November 1932
Ship	State	Description
Alberto	Spain	The cargo ship struck a rock off Villano and was beached at Camariñas, A Coruña. The crew were rescued.
Heinrich Beerman	Germany	The 130.1-foot (39.7 m), 106-ton steam trawler stranded at Mortingebazen, Nr. Florø, Norway. The vessel was refloated two days later.
Hercules	United States	After her gasoline engine broke down, the 11-gross register ton motor vessel drifted onto a beach 0.5 miles (0.8 km) south of Red Bay (56°20′N 133°18′W) in Southeast Alaska and was pounded to pieces by the surf. All three people aboard – her crew of two and a passenger – survived.
Howard Young	United Kingdom	The schooner came ashore in Bonavista Bay and was wrecked. The crew were rescued.

=== 19 November ===
List of shipwrecks: 19 November 1932
Ship	State	Description
Marionga J. Goulandris	Greece	The cargo ship came ashore at Punta del Este, Maldonado, Uruguay. She was refloated on 5 December.

=== 22 November ===
List of shipwrecks: 22 November 1932
Ship	State	Description
Le Poilu	France	The ketch sank off Sark in the Channel Islands.

=== 23 November ===
List of shipwrecks: 23 November 1932
Ship	State	Description
Calliope Leitch	United Kingdom	The cargo ship was driven ashore at Drapetsona, Greece. She was refloated on 27 November and beached in St George Bay.
Rosario	Italy	The tanker ran aground off Leander's Tower, Istanbul, Turkey. She was refloated on 28 November.
Tecumseh	United Kingdom	The tanker ran aground at Inhaca, Portuguese East Africa and was a total loss.

=== 26 November ===
List of shipwrecks: 26 November 1932
Ship	State	Description
Herta Grube	Germany	The auxiliary schooner was wrecked at Kalmar, Småland, Sweden with the loss of all hands.

=== 27 November ===
List of shipwrecks: 27 November 1932
Ship	State	Description
Edith Dawson	United Kingdom	495 GRT British schooner on passage from Turks and Caicos Islands to Nova Scotia with a cargo of salt ran into strong northerly gale east of Jacksonville and started leaking badly. The crew started the pumps, but the salt cargo got mixed with water in her hold and made a slush shutting down the pumps. American tanker Sylvan Arrow spotted distress fire on the schooner's deck and managed to get close to the disabled ship and transfer all seven people on board. The schooner soon burst into flames and sank a few hours later. The crew was safely landed in Beaumont on 6 December.

=== 28 November ===
List of shipwrecks: 28 November 1932
Ship	State	Description
Le Saint Laurent	France	The coaster collided with Mana (France) in the Atlantic Ocean off Cayenne, French Guiana and sank.

=== 29 November ===
List of shipwrecks: 29 November 1932
Ship	State	Description
Margit	Chile	The cargo ship caught fire at Talcahuaso and was abandoned by her crew. She was a total loss.

=== 30 November ===
List of shipwrecks: 30 November 1932
Ship	State	Description
Georgian	United Kingdom	The cargo ship ran aground on Grand Island, Michigan. Salvage operation were postponed on 13 December until the following spring.

== December ==
=== 1 December ===
List of shipwrecks: 1 December 1932
Ship	State	Description
Cairndhu	United Kingdom	The cargo ship ran aground in the Saint Lawrence River. She was refloated on 22 December.

=== 2 December ===
List of shipwrecks: 2 December 1932
Ship	State	Description
Clemencia	Canada	The schooner was abandoned in the Atlantic Ocean. Her crew were rescued by De Grasse (France).

=== 4 December ===
List of shipwrecks: 4 December 1932
Ship	State	Description
Rosalee	United States	After her gasoline engine broke down during a voyage in Southeast Alaska from Juneau to Tenakee Springs, the 11-gross register ton, 32.8-foot (10.0 m) fishing vessel was blown onto the beach near Point Hilda (58°13′00″N 134°30′10″W). Half an hour later, while still on the beach, she was destroyed by a fire that started in her stove and ignited her store of gasoline. The two people on board both survived.

=== 5 December ===
List of shipwrecks: 5 December 1932
Ship	State	Description
Novadoc	United Kingdom	The cargo ship ran aground in the Saint Lawrence River at Alexandria Bay, New York, United States. She was refloated on 8 December.
Sawarabi	Imperial Japanese Navy	The Wakatake-class destroyer capsized and sank off Formosa with the loss of 106 of her 120 crew. Survivors were rescued by Isuzu (Imperial Japanese Navy).
Sea Thrush	United States	The cargo ship ran aground on the Clatsop Spit at the mouth of the Columbia River. She was a total loss.

=== 7 December ===
List of shipwrecks: 7 December 1932
Ship	State	Description
Kogiku Maru	Japan	The cargo ship ran aground at Chemulpo, Korea and was abandoned. She sank on 12 December.
Lynceus	United Kingdom	The coaster came ashore at Bacton, Norfolk with the loss of one of her four crew. The survivors were rescued by rocket apparatus. She was refloated on 14 December.

=== 8 December ===
List of shipwrecks: 8 December 1932
Ship	State	Description
Negada	Chile	The cargo ship ran aground on the Quita Sueño Bank. She was abandoned as a total loss on 15 December.

=== 9 December ===
List of shipwrecks: 9 December 1932
Ship	State	Description
Sophie	Germany	The auxiliary schooner came ashore 10 nautical miles (19 km) west of Rixhöft, West Prussia. She was refloated on 13 December.

=== 10 December ===
List of shipwrecks: 10 December 1932
Ship	State	Description
Atrato	Colombia	The cargo ship was destroyed by fire at Cispata.
Timios Stavros	Greece	The cargo ship sprang a leak and foundered in the Mediterranean Sea (36°53′N 19°44′E). All crew were rescued by Patria (Greece).

=== 11 December ===
List of shipwrecks: 11 December 1932
Ship	State	Description
Engels	Soviet Navy	The Orfey-class destroyer ran aground off the Tolbukhin Lighthouse. She was refloated on 18 December and towed in to Kronstadt, where she was repaired.

=== 12 December ===
List of shipwrecks: 12 December 1932
Ship	State	Description
Electra	Germany	The coaster collided with Tilsit (Germany) in the Baltic Sea off Holtenau, Schleswig-Holstein and was beached.
La Mouette	France	The brigantine sprang a leak and foundered in the Atlantic Ocean off the Isles of Scilly, United Kingdom (50°30′N 7°30′W). All five crew were rescued by the trawler Kilgarran Castle (United Kingdom).

=== 13 December ===
List of shipwrecks: 13 December 1932
Ship	State	Description
Cantabria	Spain	The cargo ship came ashore 1 nautical mile (1.9 km) west of Bolt Head, Devon, United Kingdom. All 24 crew were rescued by the Salcombe Lifeboat. She was a total loss.

=== 14 December ===
List of shipwrecks: 14 December 1932
Ship	State	Description
Hosianna	Germany	The auxiliary sailing vessel caught fire and sank in the North Sea off Neuwerk, Hamburg.

=== 15 December ===
List of shipwrecks: 15 December 1932
Ship	State	Description
Lieutenant Fontan	France	The three-masted schooner caught fire in the Bay of Biscay 35 nautical miles (65 km) north west of Ouessant, Finistère and sank. The crew were rescued by San Andres (Norway).
Meta Trudler	Germany	The auxiliary sailing ship came ashore south of Gothenburg, Sweden. She was a total loss.

=== 16 December ===
List of shipwrecks: 16 December 1932
Ship	State	Description
Tasmania	United States	The 10-gross register ton, 33.9-foot (10.3 m) motor vessel was destroyed by fire off Wrangell in Southeast Alaska. All four people on board survived.

=== 17 December ===
List of shipwrecks: 17 December 1932
Ship	State	Description
Norden	Sweden	The cargo ship sank off Varberg, Halland County.

=== 19 December ===
List of shipwrecks: 19 December 1932
Ship	State	Description
Elizabeth	United States	The cargo ship ran aground at the mouth of the Cape Fear River, North Carolina. She was refloated on 23 December.

=== 21 December ===
List of shipwrecks: 21 December 1932
Ship	State	Description
Gateshead	United Kingdom	The coaster collided with Miranda (Norway) in the North Sea 8 nautical miles (15 km) off Seaham, County Durham and sank with the loss of eight of her thirteen crew.
Kedumba	United Kingdom	The ferry foundered off Montague Island, New South Wales, Australia.
Seine	France	The cargo ship sprang a leak in the Bay of Biscay 70 nautical miles (130 km) off the La Coubre Lighthouse, Charente-Maritime and was abandoned. The crew were rescued by a trawler. Seine was taken in tow by Dupleix (French Navy). She foundered 40 nautical miles (74 km) south west of La Pallice, Charente-Maritime.

=== 22 December ===
List of shipwrecks: 22 December 1932
Ship	State	Description
Navemar	Spain	The cargo ship collided with Bernardin de St. Pierre (France) at Marseille, Bouches-du-Rhône, France and was beached.

=== 23 December ===
List of shipwrecks: 23 December 1932
Ship	State	Description
Discoverer	United States	The 38-gross register ton, 55.4-foot (16.9 m) passenger vessel sank at Ninilchik, Territory of Alaska. All four people on board survived.

=== 24 December ===
List of shipwrecks: 24 December 1932
Ship	State	Description
Newbrough	United Kingdom	The cargo ship ran aground at Morant Cays, Jamaica. Salvage efforts were abandoned on 7 March 1933 and she was declared a total loss.
Philip	Denmark	The schooner was rammed and sunk off Korsor by a ferry.

=== 25 December ===
List of shipwrecks: 25 December 1932
Ship	State	Description
Agia Paraskevi	Greece	The cargo ship ran aground off Laurium. She was refloated on 2 January 1933.

=== 27 December ===
List of shipwrecks: 27 December 1932
Ship	State	Description
Alfred E. Hunt	United States	The dredger sank in the Saint Lawrence River.
Banyei Maru No.2	Japan	The cargo ship ran aground at Tsuchizaki. She was refloated on 3 January.
Jupiter	Germany	The cargo ship collided with Esther Thorden (Sweden) in the Kaiser Wilhelm Canal at Andorf and sank.

=== 28 December ===
List of shipwrecks: 28 December 1932
Ship	State	Description
Hsin Fuh-Tai	China	The cargo ship was holed and sank in the East China Sea (30°45′N 122°30′E) with the loss of 35 of her 52 crew.
Nordnes	Norway	The auxiliary schooner collided with Pinmarken in the North Sea off Bergen, Norway and sank.

=== 29 December ===
List of shipwrecks: 29 December 1932
Ship	State	Description
Doris Kellogg	United States	The tanker caught fire in the Atlantic Ocean off the coast of South Carolina. She exploded and sank the next day (33°27′N 76°45′W).
J. D. Drake	United Kingdom	The Thames barge collided with Cape Ortegal (United Kingdom) in the River Thames at Gravesend, Kent. The crew were rescued.

=== Unknown date ===
List of shipwrecks: Unknown date 1932
Ship	State	Description
Pieter Corneliszoon Hooft	Netherlands	The ocean liner broke free from her tow, hit the harbour wall at Pernis, caught fire and then sank. She was raised and completed her journey to the scrapyard.

== Unknown date ==
List of shipwrecks: Unknown date in 1932
Ship	State	Description
City of Taunton	United States	The 292-foot (89 m) cargo ship, a sidewheel paddle steamer, was beached and abandoned at Somerset, Massachusetts, on the west bank of the Taunton River at 41°42′39″N 071°10′33″W, just south of the future site of the Charles M. Braga Jr. Memorial Bridge, sometime during the 1930s. The wreck settled on the river bottom in very shallow water.
Coyote	United States	The 267-foot (81 m), 3,500-gross register ton cargo ship was scuttled as a means of disposal in 170 feet (52 m) of water off Massachusetts outside Boston Harbor at 42°22′06″N 070°43′06″W.
Cuyamaca	Mexico	The hulked 420-foot (130 m) 6,486-ton, concrete-hulled tanker was used to create a breakwater at Frontera.
Eagle	United States	The small two-masted schooner was lost off the coast of the Territory of Alaska off "Cape Nord," presumably a reference to Point Romanof (63°12′N 162°50′W), known as Cape Nord at the time.
F. C. Pendleton	United States	The 145-foot (44 m), 408-gross register ton three-masted schooner burned and sank without loss of life in up to 45 feet (14 m) of water at 44°19′38″N 068°54′27″W while at anchor in Seal Harbor at Islesboro, Maine, sometime during the 1930s.
Faith	Mexico	The hulked 320-foot (98 m), 4,500-ton, concrete-hulled cargo ship was scuttled as embankment in the Grijalva River, Mexico.
Gardner G. Deering	United States	The 251-foot (77 m), 1,982-gross register ton five-masted schooner was abandoned and later burned in Smith Cove off West Brooksville, Maine, sometime during the 1930s. Her wreck settled in 10 to 30 feet (3.0 to 9.1 m) of water approximately 500 feet (150 m) off the north shore of the cove at 44°22′55″N 068°46′30″W.
Moffitt	Mexico	The hulked 420-foot (130 m), 6,144-ton, concrete-hulled tanker was used to create a breakwater at Frontera.
Sunrise	United States	The 23-ton fishing vessel was reported lost at Carlisle Island in the Islands of Four Mountains in the Aleutian Islands.
T4	Royal Yugoslav Navy	The torpedo boat was wrecked on the coast of Dalmatia, Kingdom of Yugoslavia.
Taldora	Australia	The lighter sank in the Brisbane River.
Trapu	France	The tugboat was sunk in a collision with Ville De Verdun (France) at/off Dunkirk in January or February. Raised in February.
