= SS Lebanon =

SS Lebanon may refer to:

- SS Lebanon (1894), a collier built for the Philadelphia and Reading Railroad; acquired by the United States Navy for the Spanish–American War in 1898 and remained in commission through 1922; sold for commercial service in June 1922; scrapped in July 1932
- SS Lebanon (1919), a Hog Islander of the Design 1022 type; served in the United States Navy as cargo ship Vega (AK-17) from 1921 through the end of World War II; scrapped in 1946
