= List of shipwrecks in 1821 =

The list of shipwrecks in 1821 includes ships sunk, wrecked or otherwise lost during 1821.

table of contents
← 1820 / 1821 / 1822 →
Jan	Feb	Mar	Apr
May	Jun	Jul	Aug
Sep	Oct	Nov	Dec
Unknown date

== Unknown date ==
List of shipwrecks: Unknown date in 1821
Ship	State	Description
Alexander	United Kingdom	The ship was captured by pirates and destroyed off Belize. Some of her crew were murdered.
Atlantic	United Kingdom	The ship was wrecked on the north coast of Jamaica. She was on a voyage from Liverpool, Lancashire to Kingston, Jamaica and "St. Lucas".
Auguste	France	The ship was lost in the Bahama Channel. She was on a voyage from Havre de Grâce, Seine-Inférieure to Havana, Cuba.
Aurora	United Kingdom	The whaler foundered in the Atlantic Ocean, Seven crew were rescued by Robert (United Kingdom). Another report has Aurora foundering at 51°N 31°W on her way from Glasgow, with Robert taking seven crew to Quebec.
Barnet	United Kingdom	The ship was wrecked at sea with the loss of her captain. Thirteen survivors were rescued by Ann (United States). She was on a voyage from New Brunswick, British North America to Liverpool, Lancashire.
Cervantes	United Kingdom	The whaler was lost in the Davis Strait.
Cossack	United Kingdom	The ship was driven ashore on the Balize. She was on a voyage from Liverpool, Lancashire to New Orleans, Louisiana, United States.
Dexterity	United Kingdom	The whaler was wrecked on a reef off the coast of Greenland. Her crew were rescued.
Earl Fauconberg	United Kingdom	The whaler was sunk by ice off the coast of Greenland.
Elizabeth	United Kingdom	The whaler was lost in the Davis Strait.
Felix	Portugal	The ship was wrecked on the coast of Pará, Brazil.
Fortuna	Sweden	The ship was lost whilst on a voyage from Brazil to Cherbourg, Seine-Inférieure.
Free Briton	United Kingdom	The ship foundered in the Grand Banks of Newfoundland. Her crew were rescued by Pembroke (United Kingdom). She was on a voyage from London to Saint John, New Brunswick, British North America.
Halifax Packet	United States	The ship was declared missing on 12 April. She was on a voyage from Londonderry to New York.
Harmony	United Kingdom	The whaler was lost in the Davis Strait.
Henry	United Kingdom	The whaler was lost in the Davis Strait.
Isaac Todd	United Kingdom	The ship was wrecked in Gaspee Bay. She was on a voyage from London to Quebec, British North America.
Jacob and Benjamin	(United Kingdom of Great Britain and Ireland) British North America	The ship was abandoned at sea whilst on a voyage from Barbados to Yarmouth, Nova Scotia. Her crew were rescued by Thalia (United Kingdom).
James Munroe	United Kingdom	The ship was wrecked on St Nicholas Key. Her crew survived.
Jane	United Kingdom	The whaler was reported lost off Greenland.
Janus	United States	The ship was declared missing on 12 April. She was on a voyage from Amsterdam, North Holland, Netherlands to New York.
Janus	Sweden	The ship was wrecked at Cape St. Rocque, Brazil. She was on a voyage from Karlskrona to Rio de Janeiro. Brazil.
Jason	United Kingdom	The ship was driven ashore and wrecked at St. Simons, Georgia, United States. She was on a voyage from Falmouth, Cornwall to Savannah, Georgia.
John	United Kingdom	The whaler was lost in the Davis Strait.
Knapton	United Kingdom	The ship was lost in Galway Bay before 3 February with the loss of all hands. She was on a voyage from Quebec City, Lower Canada, British North America to London.
Larkin	United Kingdom	The whaler was lost in the Davis Strait.
Lavinia	United Kingdom	The ship capsized in the Atlantic Ocean. She was on a voyage from Nova Scotia, British North America to the Turks Islands.
Leviathan	United Kingdom	The whaler was lost in the Davis Strait.
London	United Kingdom	The ship foundered at sea before 8 May. Her crew were rescued by St. George (United Kingdom).
Magdalena	Russia	The ship was lost at Arkhangelsk.
Martha	United States	The ship was lost in the Currituck Inlet. She was on a voyage from Bermuda to New London, Connecticut.
HM hired brig Mercury	Royal Navy	The 18-gun brig was struck by lightning, driven ashore and wrecked at Curaçao. Her crew survived.
Partridge	United Kingdom	The ship was driven ashore at Madras, India. She was refloated and taken to Bombay where she was beached and subsequently wrecked before 30 March. Partridge was on a voyage from Bengal, India to London.
Pomona	United Kingdom	The ship foundered in the Mediterranean Sea off Corsica. she was on a voyage from Sunderland, County Durham to Genoa, Grand Duchy of Tuscany.
Posthumous	United Kingdom	The ship was wrecked on "Saynce Island". Her crew survived.
Rapid	Hamburg	The ship was wrecked in the Cat's Key, Bahamas. She was on a voyage from Havana, Cuba to Hamburg.
Rebecca	United States	The ship was declared missing on 12 April. She was on a voyage from Bremen to New York.
Suffolk	United Kingdom	The ship was wrecked on Cape Sable Island, Nova Scotia, British North America. All on board were rescued. She was on a voyage from Belfast, County Antrim to Quebec City.
Susanna	United States	The brig was dismasted and abandoned in the Atlantic Ocean (31°N 55°W).
Susannah	United Kingdom	The ship was wrecked whilst on a voyage from Kingston, Jamaica to Trinidad, Cuba. Her crew were rescued.
Symmetry	United Kingdom	The whaler was lost in the Davis Strait.
Thornton	United Kingdom	The whaler was lost off Greenland.
Three Sisters	United States	The ship was wrecked on the coast of Alagoas, Brazil.
Virgine della Solitudine	Portugal	The ship was lost at Genoa, Kingdom of Sardinia. She was on a voyage from Livorno, Grand Duchy of Tuscany to Lisbon.
Wadstray	United Kingdom	The ship was lost in Black Bay, Labrador, British North America.
