= Oostzee (1980) =

The Oostzee was a Dutch coaster on which a serious toxic accident occurred on the Lower Elbe (Germany) in July 1989.

== History ==
=== 1980 to 1989 ===
The ship was built in 1980 at the Martin-Jansen shipyard in Leer/Ostfriesland, with the hull number 163 as the Oostzee for the Rotterdam shipping company Noordlijn, a subsidiary of the Haren-Emser shipping company Intersee Schiffahrtsgesellschaft. From 1981 to 1983 the ship was operated as Savonia under the management of Intersee and then sold by Noordlijn to the company "Noordzee" in Delfzijl, which operated it again in the following years under the management of Scheepvaartbedrijf Noordlijn, Emmen under the name Oostzee.

=== Poison accident in 1989 ===
In July 1989, the Oostzee was on a voyage from Rotterdam through the Kiel Canal to Leningrad. The cargo in the ship's hold included barbed wire, silica sand, zinc ingots and 3913 barrels containing about 850 tons of epichlorohydrin. On the voyage from Rotterdam to the Elbe, the freighter encountered bad weather, during which some of the dangerous goods barrels slipped. In the process, about 40 barrels leaked. At the time, Günter Hollmann, a member of the "Oostzee" crisis team, said that improper storage of the toxic barrels was to blame. Contrary to the regulations, the barrels had been placed directly on the floor of the ship and had not been stacked properly.

On July 18, 1989, the ship arrived at the Kiel Canal, where it was prevented from continuing its voyage due to cargo damage that had already resulted in a chloroform-like odor on board. The ship was referred to the Neuwerk roadstead and the crew was rescued.

Consideration was given to taking the ship to Dow Chemical in Bützfleth, to Hamburg or to Cuxhaven, but each destination was rejected due to their proximity to residential areas. Ultimately, the Oostzee was taken to the Elbe port in Brunsbüttel to discharge the damaged cargo. The corresponding work lasted for more than three weeks and resulted in a number of accidents due to a lack of protection against the extremely harmful epichlorohydrin and its compounds.

As a result, numerous aid workers, police officers and sailors became ill and died of cancer.

=== 1989 to 2009 ===
After the accident, the ship was initially operated by Noordlijn and then sold in 1994 to the Nedlloyd subsidiary K.N.S.M.-Kroonburgh in Rotterdam, where it was operated as Louise Green by the shipping company General Shipping & Chartering Services (GenChart) until 1996. From January 1996, the ship was owned as Trinity Square by Gulfranger Shipping Company in Limassol and operated by Vertom Scheepvaart- und Handelsmaatschappij in Rotterdam. Further stations were from October/November 1998 as Sandy Cay for C. Rehder Schiffsmakler und Reederei in Limassol, from July 1999 as Nordica for Unisand Shipping Company in Limassol under management of N.C. Schiffahrtsbüro in Bremerhaven and chartering by Wilhelm Tietjen Befrachtungsgesellschaft in Hamburg, from October 2004 Lady Rea for Rea Maritime Corporation in Panama and finally from August 2006 as Evgeniy Vasilyev for Dream Hills Trading in Panama under management of DSL Shipping in Limassol. At the end of 2009, the freighter was finally taken out of service and sold for demolition. In December 2009, the freighter arrived at the last port for scrapping in China.

== Importance ==
The Oostzee poison accident is still one of the best-known shipping accidents on the Elbe and attracted a great deal of media attention at the time due to the numerous mishaps during the handling process. At the time, the accident was the reason for the German Federal Ministry of Transport to build and convert existing units into so-called gas protection ships, which can be used in the event of chemical accidents at sea. The accident continues to be a case study that is mentioned again and again on the subject of the risks involved in transporting dangerous goods.

== Technology ==
Superstructure and engine plant were located aft. The ship's propulsion system consisted of a six-cylinder, four-stroke diesel engine made by MWM, which delivered its power of up to 3,000 hp (2,200 kW) to the fixed-pitch propeller via a gearbox. Two electro-hydraulic cranes were arranged on the port side.
