= List of shipwrecks in 1831 =

The list of shipwrecks in 1831 includes ships sunk, foundered, grounded, or otherwise lost during 1831.

table of contents
1831
Jan	Feb	Mar	Apr
May	Jun	Jul	Aug
Sep	Oct	Nov	Dec
Unknown date

== Unknown date ==
List of shipwrecks: Unknown date in 1831
Ship	State	Description
Amity	United Kingdom	The ship was driven ashore and severely damaged on Middle Ground Island, Bombay, India. She was later refloated.
Belmont	United Kingdom	The ship was destroyed by an explosion and fire at Calabar, Nigeria with the loss of four of her crew.
Billow	United Kingdom	The transport ship, a brig, was wrecked on Ragged Island, Bahamas with the loss of all 98 passengers on board. Her crew were also lost.
Cape Henry	Unknown	The schooner was lost in the vicinity of "Squan Beach," a term used at the time for the coast of New Jersey near Manasquan and sometimes for the 7-mile (11 km) stretch of coast between Manasquan Inlet and Cranberry Inlet or for the entire coast of New Jersey between Sea Girt and Barnegat Inlet.
Collector	United States	The schooner was wrecked on Anegada, Virgin Islands.
Corsica	United States	The brig was wrecked on Anegada.
Curwen	United Kingdom	The ship foundered on a voyage from Ireland to England before 22 October with the loss of all hands.
Donna della Gracia	Spain	The brig was wrecked on Anegada.
Eagle	United Kingdom	The ship was wrecked off Portrush, County Antrim.
Francis	United Kingdom	The brig was wrecked on Anegada.
Guildford	United Kingdom	The merchant ship was wrecked in the Indian Ocean at approximately 7°N 80°E in late April or early May with the loss of all hands. Margaret (flag unknown) sighted the wreck of Guidlford on 8 May as well as a raft constructed from Guildford′s rigging, but nobody was on board.
Hamilton	United Kingdom	The ship was destroyed by fire at Calabar. The fire had originated in Belmont (United Kingdom.
Historian	United Kingdom	The ship was lost in the Bahama Passage. She was on a voyage from London to Havana, Cuba.
James	United Kingdom	The whaler was lost in the Davis Strait. Her crew were rescued.
Lerwick	United Kingdom	The brig was lost at Saint-Domingue.
Lewis	United States	The brig was wrecked on Anegada.
Neptune	United Kingdom	The whaler was lost in the Davis Strait. Her crew were rescued.
New John	United Kingdom	The ship sprang a leak and was abandoned off St. Pauls, Newfoundland, British North America.
North Star	United Kingdom	The ship was destroyed by fire at Canso, Nova Scotia, British North America.
Norval	United States	The ship foundered between 11 February and 28 August with the loss of all hands. She was on a voyage from Norfolk, Virginia to Tobago.
Peare	United Kingdom	The ship was wrecked on Götaland, Sweden before 2 November.
Rambler	United Kingdom	The whaler was lost in the Davis Strait. Her crew were rescued.
Restauradora	Spain	The schooner was wrecked on Anegada.
Roberts	United Kingdom	The whaler was abandoned in the South Seas.
Rock	United Kingdom	The ship was wrecked on Prince Edward Island, British North America. She was on a voyage from Richibucto, New Brunswick, British North America to Liverpool, Lancashire.
Seefahrt	Bremen	The ship was wrecked near Brindisi, Kingdom of the Two Sicilies. She was on a voyage from Trieste to Bremen.
Sivutch	Russian Empire	The vessel was lost east of Wall Bay (52°06′30″N 174°53′10″W) on Atka Island in the Catherine Archipelago. Her wreck was scrapped in situ to salvage her wood and iron.
Sophia	Sweden	The ship was abandoned in the Atlantic Ocean before 29 October. Her crew were rescued. She was on a voyage from Gothenburg to New Bedford, Massachusetts, United States.
Swiftsure	United Kingdom	The brig was wrecked in the Torres Straits before 10 July.
Tournesol	United Kingdom	The ship was destroyed by fire in the Indian Ocean 600 leagues (1,800 nautical miles, 3,300 km) east of Mauritius.
William and George	United Kingdom	The ship was driven ashore and wrecked near Saint John, New Brunswick, British North America before 27 October. She was on a voyage from Richibucto, New Brunswick to Hull, Yorkshire.
