= USS Lebanon (AG-2) =

Cargo ship of the United States Navy

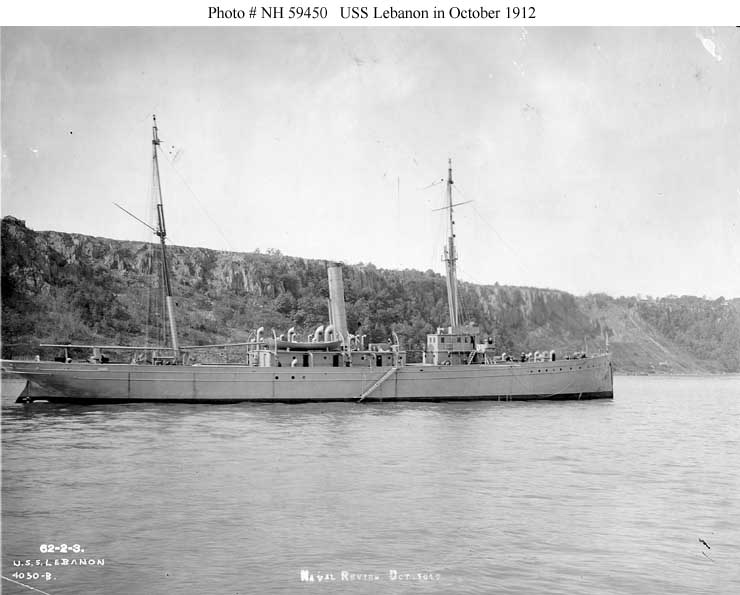

History

United States
- Name: USS Lebanon
- Namesake: Lebanon
- Builder: William Cramp & Sons, Philadelphia, Pennsylvania
- Launched: 29 September 1894
- Acquired: 6 April 1898 from Philadelphia and Reading RR. Company
- Commissioned: 16 April 1898 in Boston, Massachusetts
- Decommissioned: 6 February 1922 at New York City
- Stricken: 1922 (est.)
- Fate: Sold, 2 June 1922; Foundered, 26 July 1932

General characteristics
- Type: Collier
- Displacement: 3,285 long tons (3,338 t)
- Length: 259 ft 6 in (79.10 m)
- Beam: 37 ft 5 in (11.40 m)
- Draft: 17 ft 3 in (5.26 m)
- Speed: 8.5 kn (15.7 km/h; 9.8 mph)
- Complement: 157
- Armament: 4 × 6-pounder guns

USS Lebanon (AG-2) was a 3,285-long-ton (3,338-metric-ton) collier, which the United States Navy acquired in 1898 from the Philadelphia and Reading RR. Company to provide coal for Navy warships during the Spanish–American War. When the need for her coal was no longer a necessity, Lebanon was assigned various duty such as transporting stores as well as target repair and towing operations.

== Construction ==
Lebanon—the first ship to be so named by the U.S. Navy—was launched by William Cramp & Sons, Philadelphia, in 1894; acquired by the Navy on 6 April 1898 from Philadelphia and Reading RR. Co.; and commissioned at Boston, Massachusetts on 16 April 1898.

== Service history ==
=== Spanish–American War ===
After a brief shakedown, Lebanon departed Boston on 17 May 1898 with coal for ships fighting in the Spanish–American War. Arriving at Cardenas, Cuba on 4 June, the collier operated in the Caribbean and along the Atlantic coast for the next 10 months. Lebanon decommissioned at Norfolk, Virginia on 15 April 1899.

=== Pre-World War I service ===
Lebanon recommissioned at Portsmouth, New Hampshire on 11 August 1905. From 1905–1909, she operated as a collier along the U.S. East Coast, sailing as far south as Nicaragua to service fueling stations and the fleet in the Atlantic Ocean and in the Caribbean. She decommissioned at Norfolk on 2 October 1909.

On 1 July 1911, Lebanon again recommissioned and was assigned to duty as a range ship. Operating along the U.S. east coast during the rest of the year, she transported stores and ammunition to eastern ports before joining the fleet in the Caribbean for the 1912 winter maneuvers. For the next four years, Lebanon operated as a target towing ship during fleet exercises along the coast and in the Caribbean.

=== World War I ===
After America's entry into World War I, her activities increased as she assisted the fighting ships to prepare for action in the war-ravaged waters. Lebanon continued target repair and towing operations in the Atlantic and Caribbean for the rest of her naval service.

=== Final decommissioning ===
Lebanon decommissioned at New York City on 6 February 1922 and was sold on 2 June.

== Commercial Service and Loss ==
Lebanon was again sold at a public auction on 28 September 1922 to J. J. McGrath of Phoenicia, New York.

By 1925, Lebanon had been renamed as Taboga, then Homestead, and was operating under Nicaragua registry. On 6 February 1925, Homestead was seized by United States Coast Guard forces at sea near Montauk Point after a 36-hour standoff.

Homestead was reported to have foundered at Humber Arm in Newfoundland on 26 July 1932 while under Dominion of Newfoundland registry.

== See also ==
- Reading Company
- Port Richmond, Philadelphia
