= List of shipwrecks in 1823 =

The list of shipwrecks in 1823 includes some ships sunk, wrecked or otherwise lost during 1823.

table of contents
1823
Jan	Feb	Mar	Apr
May	Jun	Jul	Aug
Sep	Oct	Nov	Dec
Unknown date

== Unknown date ==
List of shipwrecks: Unknown date 1823
Ship	State	Description
Ambrook	United Kingdom	The ship was driven ashore at Gibraltar between 30 January and 2 February.
Ann	United Kingdom	The ship was driven ashore at Gibraltar between 30 January and 2 February.
Ann Lucy	United Kingdom	The ship was driven ashore at Gibraltar between 30 January and 2 February.
Cæsar	Hamburg	The ship was wrecked at Cape San Román, Venezuela. she was on a voyage from Hamburg to Havana, Cuba.
Caroline	(United States) Missouri Territory	The ship was driven ashore at Gibraltar between 30 January and 2 February.
Delight	United States	The ship was wrecked near Nassau, Bahamas. She was on a voyage from Jamaica to Philadelphia, Pennsylvania.
Deixafalla	Brazil	The ship was lost between the River Cachipour and Cape Orange.
Duke of York	United Kingdom	The ship was wrecked on the coast of the United States. She was on a voyage from Liverpool, Lancashire, to Saint John, New Brunswick, British North America.
Eclipse	United Kingdom	The brig was lost in the Mozambique Channel. All on board were rescued.
Elizabeth	United Kingdom	The ship was lost off Bird Island. She was on a voyage from Jersey, Channel Islands, to Gambia.
Encounter	(United Kingdom of Great Britain and Ireland) Gibraltar	The storage hulk foundered at Gibraltar between 30 January and 2 February.
Exchange	France	The whaler was lost on the coast of Alta California, Mexico.
Farmer	United Kingdom	The ship was lost in the Gulf of Florida. Her crew were rescued by Florida (United States). Farmer was on a voyage from British Honduras to Liverpool.
Favorite	United Kingdom	The ship was driven ashore and severely damaged at Gibraltar between 30 January and 2 February.
Felicité	France	The ship was driven ashore at Gibraltar between 30 January and 2 February.
Flora	Portugal	The ship was lost near Bahia, Brazil. She was on a voyage from Porto to Brazil.
Fortuna	United Kingdom	The ship was driven ashore at the mouth of the Eider. She was on a voyage from Seville, Spain, to Hamburg.
Fortuna	Brazil	The ship was driven ashore at Gibraltar between 30 January and 2 February.
Hero	United Kingdom	The ship was driven ashore at Gibraltar between 30 January and 2 February.
Industry	(United Kingdom of Great Britain and Ireland) British North America	The schooner was lost on a voyage from Placentia Bay to St. John's, Newfoundland.
Iris	(United Kingdom of Great Britain and Ireland) British North America	The ship was driven ashore at Gibraltar between 30 January and 2 February.
Johannes	Sweden	The ship was driven ashore at Gibraltar between 30 January and 2 February.
John and Sarah	United Kingdom	The ship was lost off the coast of Newfoundland, British North America, before 22 February. She was on a voyage from Quebec City, Lower Canada, British North America, to Liverpool.
Juno	United Kingdom	The ship was driven ashore at Gibraltar between 30 January and 2 February.
Mackenzie	United States	The ship was driven ashore at Gibraltar between 30 January and 2 February.
Matilde	Spain	The ship was driven ashore and severely damaged at Gibraltar between 30 January and 2 February. She was on a voyage from Montevideo, Brazil, to Málaga.
Mediterraneanm	United Kingdom	The ship was driven ashore at Gibraltar between 30 January and 2 February. She was later refloated and repaired.
Mikhail (Михаил, 'Michael')	Imperial Russian Navy	The brig was driven ashore and wrecked at Cape Omgon, Kamchatka, west of the mouth of the Tigil. She was on a voyage from Okhotsk to Gizhiga.
Neptune	United Kingdom	The whaler was lost off Greenland.
Neptune	France	The ship was wrecked on the coast of Cochinchina.v
Nereide	France	The ship was lost on the coast of Alta California, Mexico.
Nymph	United Kingdom	The ship was lost in the Magdalen Islands, Lower Canada, British North America. She was on a voyage from Whitehaven, Cumberland, to Miramichi, New Brunswick.
Prince Ernest	United Kingdom	The ship was driven ashore and wrecked at Gibraltar between 30 January and 2 February.
Regent	United Kingdom	The ship foundered in the Atlantic Ocean, her crew were rescued. She was on a voyage from Liverpool to Miramichi Bay.
USS Revenge	United States Navy	The schooner was lost before 17 March whilst on a voyage from British Honduras to Charleston, South Carolina.
Robert Cochrane	United States	The ship was driven ashore at Gibraltar between 30 January and 2 February.
Severn	United Kingdom	The ship was driven ashore at Gibraltar between 30 January and 2 February.
Speculant	Kingdom of Hanover	The ship capsized with the loss of all hands whilst on a voyage from Bordeaux, Gironde, France, to the Ems.
Sylvia	United Kingdom	The ship was wrecked on the Bissagoa Shoals, off the coast of Africa. She was on a voyage from London to Cape Coast Castle, Gold Coast.
Ville de St. Pierre	France	The ship was lost in the Old Channel. She was on a voyage from Bordeaux to Havana.
Wanderer	United Kingdom	The ship was driven ashore at Gibraltar between 30 January and 2 February. She was on a voyage from Smyrna, Ottoman Empire, to London.
