= List of shipwrecks in 1820 =

The list of shipwrecks in 1820 includes ships sunk, wrecked or otherwise lost during 1820.

table of contents
1820
Jan	Feb	Mar	Apr
May	Jun	Jul	Aug
Sep	Oct	Nov	Dec
Unknown date

== Unknown date ==
List of shipwrecks: Unknown date 1820
Ship	State	Description
Amie	(United Kingdom of Great Britain and Ireland) Saint Lucia	The drogher was wrecked at Saint Lucia in late January or early February.
Auguste	France	The ship was lost in the Old Bahama Channel. She was on a voyage from Havre de Grâce, Seine-Inférieure to Havana, Cuba.
Brothers	United Kingdom	The whaler was lost in the Davis Strait.
Cruttendon	United States	The ship foundered whilst on a voyage from Havana to Charleston, South Carolina. Her crew survived.
Ebenezer	United Kingdom	The ship was destroyed by fire in the River Plate.
Eolus	United Kingdom	The ship was wrecked near St. Andrews, New Brunswick, British North America. She was on a voyage from Barbados to St. Andrews.
Four Sons	United Kingdom	The ship foundered whilst on a voyage from Puerto Rico to Tobago. Her crew were rescued.
Friends	United Kingdom	The ship foundered. All on board were rescued by Deux Sœurs (France).
Friends	United Kingdom	The ship ran aground in the Bay of Fundy.
Grape	United Kingdom	The ship was abandoned in the Atlantic Ocean. Her crew were rescued by Dart (United Kingdom).
Highflyer	United Kingdom	The whaler was lost in ice off Greenland. Her crew were rescued.
Hippolite	France	The ship was lost on the coast of East Florida, New Spain. She was on a voyage from Havana to Havre de Grâce.
Hope	United Kingdom	The whaler was lost off Greenland. Her crew were rescued.
Johannah	United Kingdom	The ship was wrecked off Poorhead, County Cork. She was on a voyage from Cork to Barbados and Trinidad.
John & Sarah	United Kingdom	The ship was lost at Richibucto, New Brunswick, British North America.
Liverpool	United Kingdom	The ship was wrecked near Cape St. James, Africa. She was on a voyage from Old Calabar to Liverpool.
Margaret	United Kingdom	The ship was wrecked on a reef off the coast of British Honduras. Her crew were rescued.
Mary	(United Kingdom of Great Britain and Ireland) Carriacou	The sloop was driven ashore and wrecked at Levera, Grenada in late January or early February.
USS Niagara	United States Navy	The brig was scuttled in Misery Bay, Lake Erie sometime in 1820. Refloated in 1913 and rebuilt for use as a museum ship.
Nore	United Kingdom	The ship was wrecked off Barbados. All on board were rescued. She was on a voyage from Belfast, County Antrim to a Bolivian port.
Oceano	Portugal	The ship foundered off Maranhão, United Kingdom of Portugal, Brazil and the Algarves. Her crew were rescued. She was on a voyage from Oporto to Maranhão.
Peggy	United Kingdom	The ship sprang a leak and was abandoned. Her crew were rescued by Mary (United Kingdom). Peggy was on a voyage from Bristol, Gloucestershire to Miramichi, New Brunswick.
Prueba	Spanish Navy	The frigate foundered in the Pacific Ocean off the coast of Chile.
Resource	United States	The ship was lost in the Marianas Islands.
St. Jose Fama	Portugal	The ship was lost in the Indian Ocean. She was on a voyage from Mozambique to Bombay, India. Her crew were rescued by the Portuguese Navy brig of war which was escorting her.
Tamar	United Kingdom	The ship was wrecked on the Bocas. She was on a voyage from Puerto Rico to Trinidad.
Thomas Henry	United Kingdom	The ship was abandoned in the Atlantic Ocean. Her crew were rescued by Venus (United Kingdom). Thomas Henry was on a voyage from Nova Scotia, British North America to Liverpool.
Welcome Return	United Kingdom	The schooner sprang a leak and was abandoned in the Atlantic Ocean (32°38′N 69°00′W).
William	United Kingdom	The brig was wrecked at New London, Prince Edward Island, British North America. Her crew were rescued.
