= Everhart =

Everhart is a surname. Notable people with the surname include:

- Angie Everhart, American actress and former fashion model
- Denise Everhart (born 1954), American politician
- Forrest E. Everhart, United States Army soldier and a recipient of the Medal of Honor
- Isaiah Fawkes Everhart (1840–1911), American physician and naturalist
- James Bowen Everhart, Republican member of the U.S. House of Representatives from Pennsylvania
- Lawrence Everhart (1755-1840), American soldier
- Nathan Everhart (born 1988), American professional wrestler better known as Jason Jordan
- Rex Everhart (1920–2000), American actor
- Ron Everhart, American college basketball coach
- Thomas Eugene Everhart, American educator and physicist
- Travis Everhart (born c. 1977), American college football coach
- William Everhart (1785–1868), member of the U.S. House of Representatives

== See also ==
- 2664 Everhart
- Everhart Museum
- Everhart–Thornley detector
