= Benjamin Matlack Everhart =

American scientist (1818–1904)

- Born: April 24, 1818
- Died: September 22, 1904 (aged 86); West Chester, Pennsylvania, U.S.
- Resting place: Oaklands Cemetery
- Occupation: Mycologist
- Father: William Everhart
- Relatives: James Bowen Everhart (brother); Isaiah Fawkes Everhart (cousin)

Benjamin Matlack Everhart (April 24, 1818 – September 22, 1904) was an American mycologist from West Chester, Pennsylvania.

== Biography ==
Everhart was born in 1818. His father, William Everhart, the son of a Revolutionary soldier, was a merchant, and a member of congress in 1853–55. Benjamin was educated in private schools in West Chester, Pennsylvania, and spent his early life in mercantile business there and in Charleston, South Carolina, making a comfortable fortune.

From boyhood, he was an ardent student of botany, and after retiring from business in 1867 he devoted himself almost entirely to that science, particularly to cryptogamic botany. In connection with J. B. Ellis, of New Jersey, he was active in issuing yearly fifty volumes, called The Century of North American Fungi, each volume describing 100 species. At the same time, with William A. Kellerman, of Kansas, they published the Journal of Mycology. He was co-editor of two exsiccata series entitled North American fungi. Second series and Fungi Columbiani, distributed by J. B. Ellis.

He discovered many new fungi. The genus Everhartia was named by Pier Andrea Saccardo in Everhart's honour (in 1888), as well as the following species:

- Everhartia hymenuloides Sacc. et Ellis
- Melanconis Everhartii Ellis
- Myrioccoccum Everhartii Ellis & Sacc.
- Ophionectria Everhartii Ellis & Gal.
- Mucronoporus Everhartii Ellis & Gal.
- Pestalozzia Everhartii Sacc. & Syd.
- Sorosporium Everhartii Ellis & Gal.
- Dothiorella Everhartii Sacc. & Syd.
- Gloeosporium Everhartii Sacc. & Syd.
- Myxosporium Everhartii Sacc. & Syd.
- Phyllosticta Everhartii Sacc. & Syd.
- Physalospora Everhartii Sacc. & Syd.
- Septoria Everhartii Sacc. & Syd.

== Personal life ==
His brother James Bowen Everhart was a member of congress. His brother John R. Everhart was a surgeon and author. He owned a mansion on West Manor Street in West Chester.

Everhart died on September 22, 1904, in West Chester. He was buried at Oaklands Cemetery. A large portion of his estate was left to his cousin Isaiah Fawkes Everhart.

== Legacy ==
Following his death, Everhart donated 10 acres (4.0 ha) to West Chester for Everhart Park.
