= Senator Harlan (disambiguation) =

James Harlan (1820–1899) was a U.S. Senator from Iowa from 1855 to 1857, 1857 to 1865, and 1867 to 1873. Senator Harlan may also refer to:

- Aaron Harlan (1802–1868), Ohio State Senate
- Abram D. Harlan (1833–1908), Pennsylvania State Senate
