= Nay Aug Park =

Park in Scranton, Pennsylvania, United States

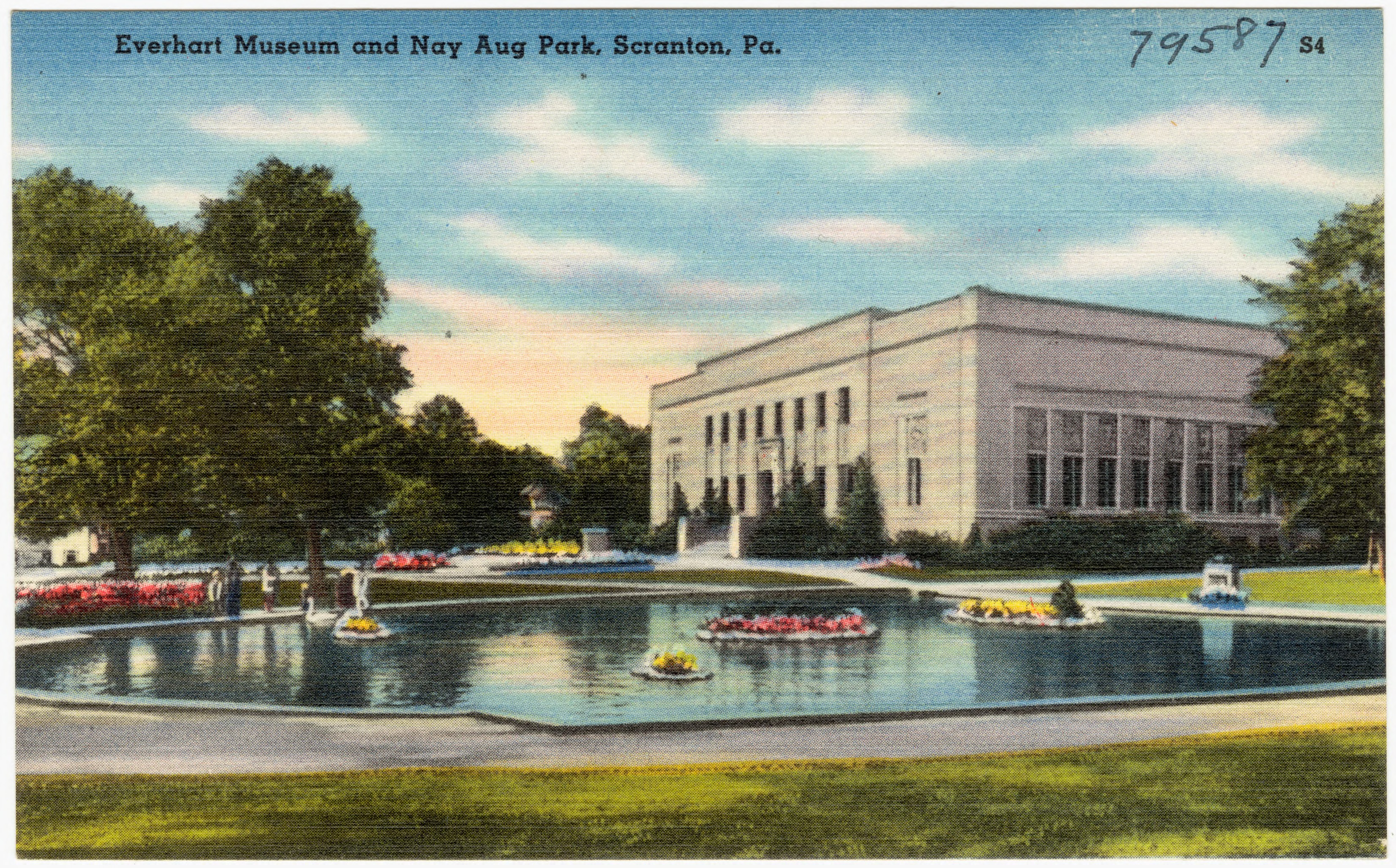
- 1940s postcard view
- Interactive map of Nay Aug Park
- Type: Urban park
- Location: Scranton, Pennsylvania
- Coordinates: 41°24′05″N 75°38′34″W
- Operator: City of Scranton
- Status: Open all year

U.S. National Natural Landmark
- Designated: 1989

Nay Aug Park is the largest park in Scranton, Pennsylvania. An amusement park on the site closed in the 1990s, but a small amusement area still operates near the swimming pool complex. The park also houses the Nay Aug Gorge, the Everhart Museum, and Brooks Mine, a small show mine. At one time it also had a zoo, as well as two Olympic-sized swimming pools.

The name of the park is of Native American origin, meaning "noisy brook".

== Park ==
=== Nay Aug Gorge ===
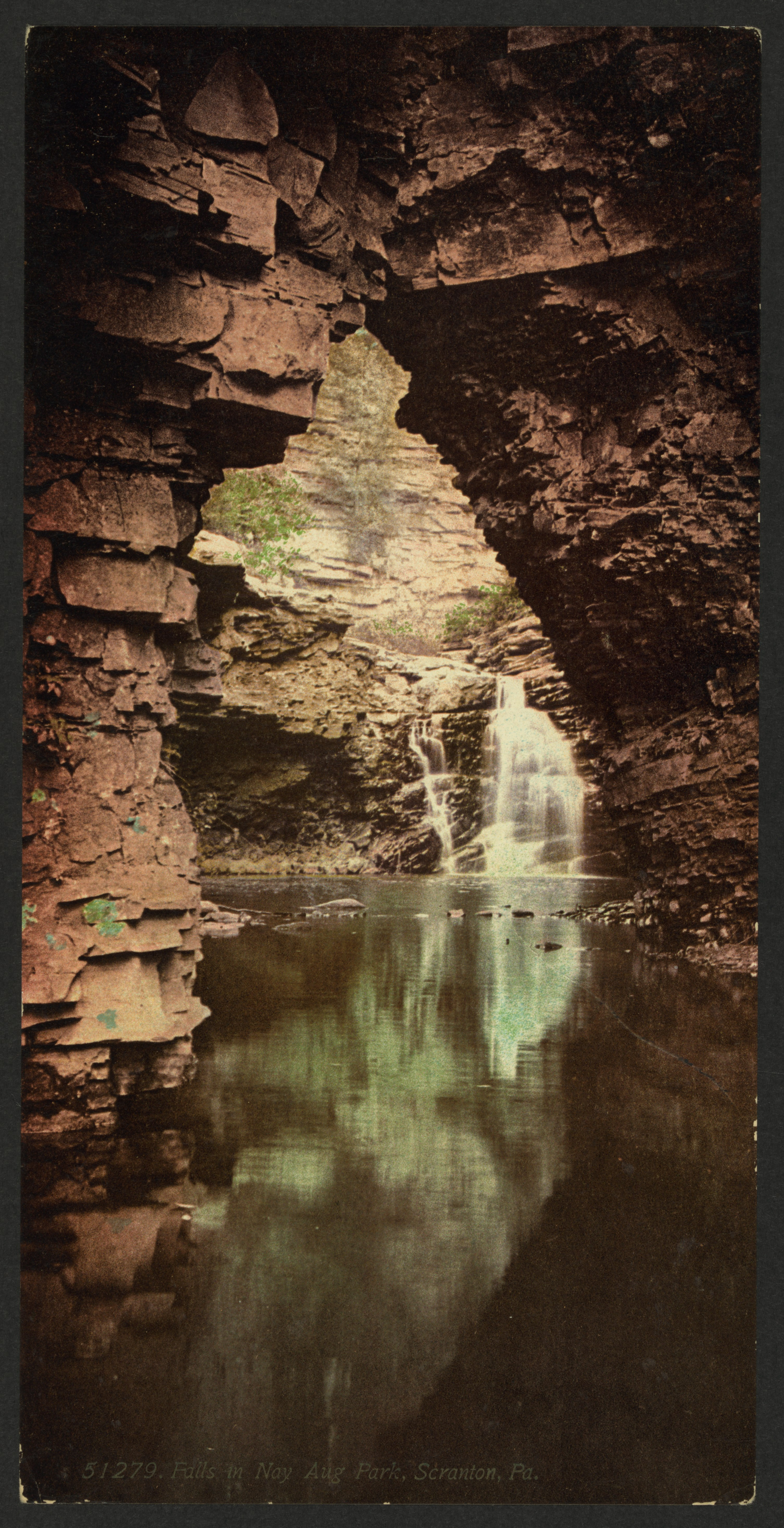
Historic view of waterfall in the gorge

The Nay Aug Gorge was created at the end of the most recent ice age, and is a popular illegal swimming spot. In 2007, the David Wenzel Tree House opened, with views overlooking the gorge and surrounding area. The tree house was designed to be fully handicapped accessible, and is the first of its kind in the area. A footbridge with views of Roaring Brook also opened in 2007. In June 2017, the tree house and footbridge were closed indefinitely due to structural concerns. The footbridge was reopened in May 2019.

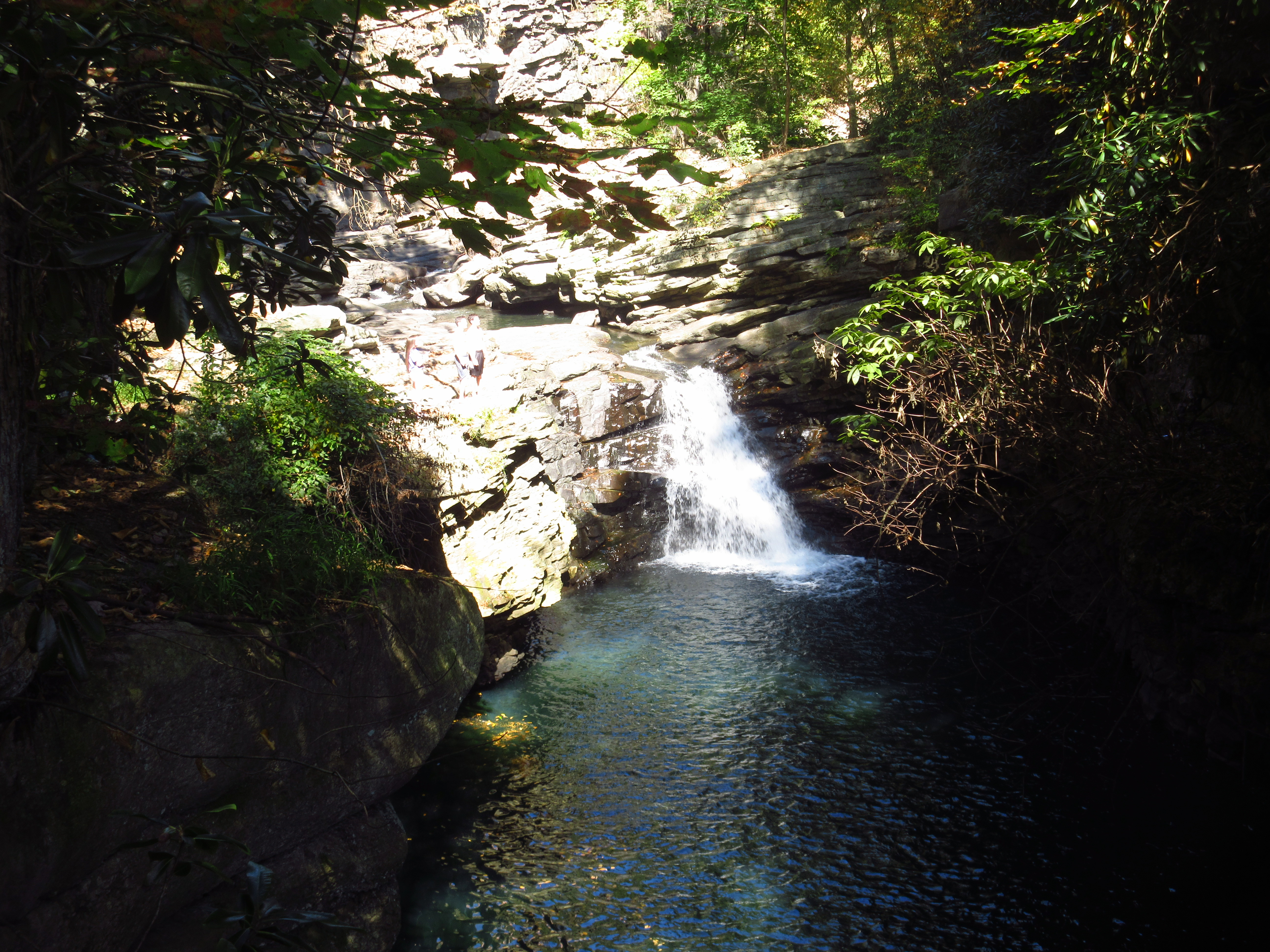
Modern view of the waterfall

=== Zoo ===
The Zoo at Nay Aug Park once hosted well-known animals Tilly the elephant and Joshua the donkey. The zoo closed in 1988, and in 1989, their resident elephant, Toni, was shipped to the National Zoo in Washington D.C. The zoo remained closed until the summer of 2003, when it reopened as the Genesis Wildlife Center. A 2008 Time magazine article rated it the 4th most abusive zoo in America. In 2009 the zoo once again closed due to public outcry over conditions, and Lackawanna College announced plans to turn it into a natural research center. These plans fell through, and the Scranton Recreation Authority started plans in 2012 to redevelop it as part of the park, preserving the 70-year-old main zoo building. It was announced on August 27, 2014, that the zoo would be leased for $1 per year for the next five years by a local non-profit called "Street Cats" to spay and neuter the feral cat population in the city of Scranton. Scenes from the 1982 film That Championship Season were filmed in the park's zoo.

=== Swimming pools ===
Two Olympic-size swimming pools were once located at the park. The pools offered two diving boards and two waterslides. However, after being closed in 2020 due to the COVID-19 pandemic, it was announced that the pools would be removed. The pools were demolished in 2022.

=== Brooks Mine ===
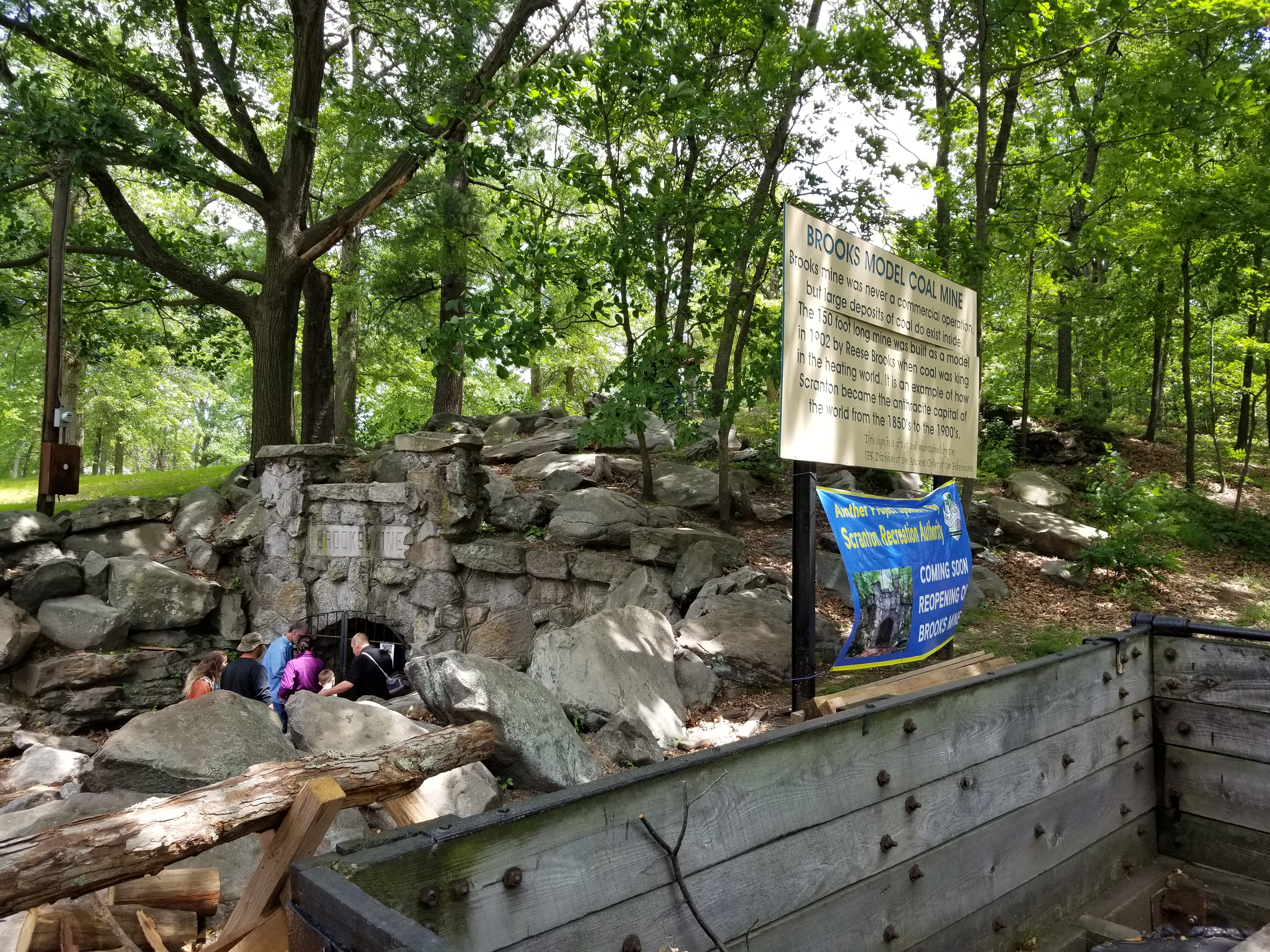
Entrance to Brooks Mine in 2022

Built in 1902, the small 150 ft (46 m) long Brooks Mine, located in the park, was conceived and funded by Reese Brooks, owner of a coal mine in Moosic, Pennsylvania, as a training location for miners-in-training and a show mine to showcase the region's coal industry. Although not a commercial operation, the mine intersects two veins of coal which run under the park. The mine was closed temporarily in 1938, and closed permanently in 1985 when the retired Lackawanna Coal Mine opened for tours. The mine was rehabilitated and reopened to the public by volunteers in 2023.

== The Everhart Museum ==
The Everhart Museum was founded in 1908 by Dr. Isaiah Fawkes Everhart. In honor of the museum's founder, Lake Everhart and a bronze statue of Dr. Everhart were dedicated on May 20, 1911. Dr. Everhart died five days later. The Everhart Museum is a non-profit institution dedicated to the collection, care and display of a diverse array of artifacts, including natural history, science and fine arts. The museum also contains a library.

== Amusement park ==
Nay Aug Amusement Park was a small amusement park formerly located on the park grounds. It was run by Karl and Ralph Strohl, who received the park from their father. The amusements included toy tanks in a circle, a Caterpillar ride, bumper cars, helicopters, cars on a track, a merry-go-round, boats in a small pond, and a small Whip. One of the park's highlights was its small wooden roller coaster, Comet (also known as Comet Jr.). There was also a miniature Lackawanna train whose track circled the roller coaster. The arcade pavilion building was previously a dance hall during the 1930s and 1940s, where many big bands played. From the 1950s until the amusement park's closing, the building housed the bumper cars, as well as various arcade machines and amusements like pinball, skee-ball, skill crane and other machines. The park was closed in the 1990s, and its site is now vacant.

== Christmas light show ==
Since the early 2000s, the park has been home to a free drive-through Christmas light show, which features more than 100 Christmas light displays. It begins at the entrance on Mulberry Street and stretches past the tree house, former petting zoo, playground and former pool areas, before exiting on Olive Street. Depending on the weather, there is also a horse and carriage available for rides.
