= Scott Wallace =

Scott Wallace may refer to:

- Scott Wallace (photojournalist) (born 1954), American journalist
- Scott Wallace (politician), Republican member of the New Hampshire House of Representatives
- Scott Wallace (River City), a fictional character in the TV series River City
- George Scott Wallace (1929–2011), Canadian physician and politician
- William S. Wallace (born 1946), American army general
- Wallace Scott (1924–2003), American aviator and author
- Tammy Scott-Wallace, Canadian politician
- John Wallace Scott (1832–1903), American soldier
