= 157th Pennsylvania Infantry Regiment =

Union Army infantry regiment

157th Pennsylvania Infantry
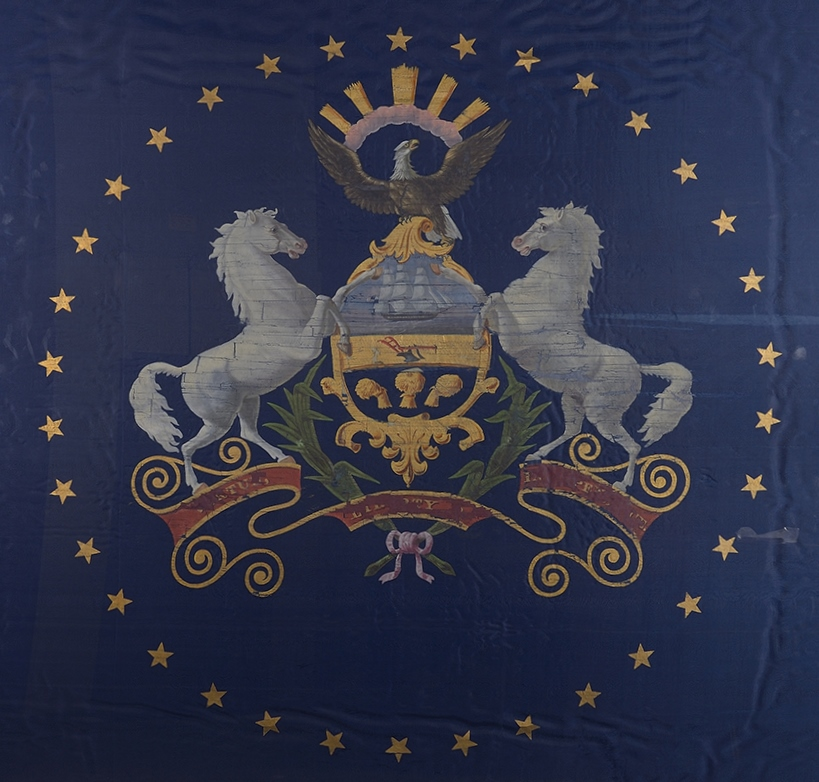
- State flag of Pennsylvania, c. 1863
- Active: Fall 1862 – March 21, 1865 (merged with 191st Pennsylvania)
- Country: United States
- Allegiance: Union:
- Branch: Infantry
- Size: Battalion
- Engagements: American Civil War: Battle of Cold Harbor; Siege of Petersburg; Battle of the Crater; Battle of Poplar Springs Church; Battle of Boydton Plank Road; Battle of Hatcher's Run; Appomattox Campaign (after merger with the 191st Pennsylvania)

Commanders
- lieutenant colonel: Edmund T. Tiers
- major: Thomas H. Addicks

The 157th Pennsylvania Volunteer Infantry was a Union infantry regiment which fought in multiple key engagements during the final years of the American Civil War, including the Battle of Cold Harbor, Siege of Petersburg, and Appomattox Campaign. One of two military units raised at roughly the same time in the Philadelphia area during the fall of 1862, the 157th Pennsylvania was stationed initially at Fort Delaware, beginning in December 1862, and remained there on garrison duty until it was reassigned to the defense of Washington, D.C. during the early winter of 1863. It was then assigned to the Army of the Potomac during the spring of 1864, and sent to the front lines of the war's Eastern Theater, where it remained for the duration of the war. During a reorganization of Union Army units in the spring of 1865, its men were merged with those of the 191st Pennsylvania Infantry.

== History ==
Raised in response to the continuing need for additional soldiers to support the Union Army during the American Civil War, the 156th and 157th Pennsylvania Volunteer Infantry regiments began their respective recruiting drives in the Philadelphia area during the fall of 1862. Neither drive went well, however; as a result, by December 1862, the partially-staffed 157th Pennsylvania was assigned to garrison duty at Fort Delaware. With recruitment still proceeding slowly for both regiments after the New Year of 1863, the men who had been recruited for the 156th Pennsylvania, who numbered roughly the size of just one company, were transferred to the 157th Pennsylvania Infantry, thereby forming a battalion composed of four companies. The commissioned officers appointed to lead this new iteration of the 157th Pennsylvania were: Edmund T. Tiers, lieutenant colonel, and Thomas H. Addicks, major.

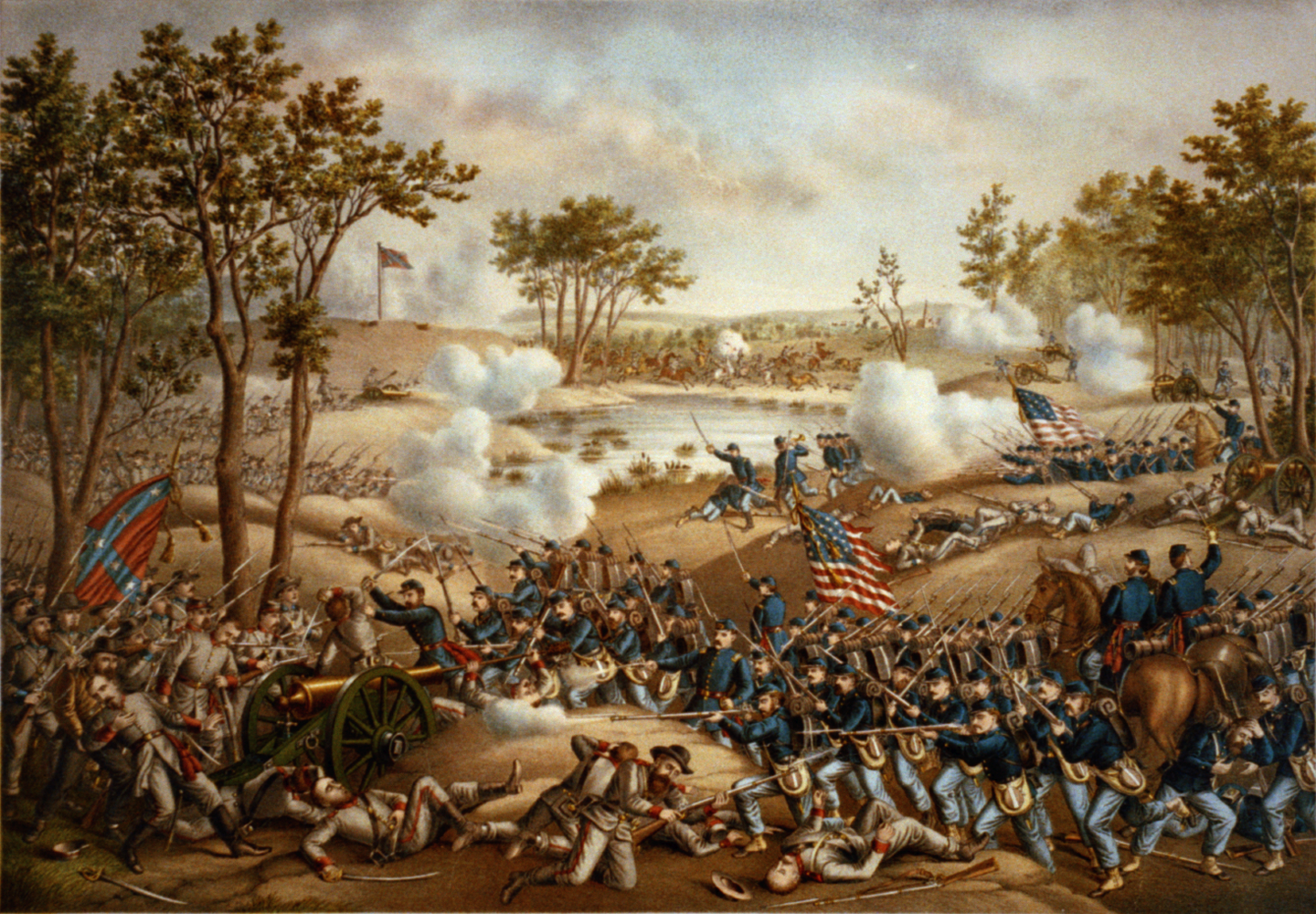
Battle of Cold Harbor, Virginia, June 1–12, 1864.

The men of the newly reorganized 157th Pennsylvania were then transported to Washington, D.C., attached to Tyler's Division, 22nd Corps in February 1863, and assigned to defensive duties of the city. On May 29, 1864, the battalion was reassigned to the 2nd Brigade, 4th Division, 5th Army Corps of the Army of the Potomac, and ordered out on operations between North Anna and Cold Harbor, Virginia. Engaged in the battles of Bethesda Church (June 1–3) and Cold Harbor (June 1–12), the 157th Pennsylvania then participated in the Siege of Petersburg, including the Battle of the Crater (July 30). Attached to the 3rd Brigade, 2nd Division, 5th Army Corps beginning in August 1864, the 157th Pennsylvanians were then assigned to operations along the Weldon Railroad (August 18–21) before engaging in the fighting at Poplar Springs Church (September 30–October 2), Yellow House (October 2), and Boydton Plank Road (October 27–28), and in Warren's Raid on the Weldon Railroad (December 7–12).

Engaged in the Battle of Hatcher's Run (February 5–7, 1865), the 157th Pennsylvania was then merged into the 191st Pennsylvania Infantry on March 21, 1865, and assigned to the Appomattox Campaign. According to historians of the Pennsylvania Capitol Preservation Committee, the agency responsible for the conservation of the state's Civil War-era battle flags, it was on that same day that the 157th Pennsylvania's original commanding officer, Edmund T. Tiers, requested that his regiment be given its First State Color. Although the flag was eventually manufactured by Horstmann Brothers and Company, it was never carried into battle.

Present for Confederate General Robert E. Lee's surrender at Appomattox Court House on April 9, the men of the 157th Pennsylvania (now part of the 191st Pennsylvania), then officially mustered out in Virginia on June 28, 1865.

According to historian Samuel Bates, “In consequence of its consolidation, no separate muster-out rolls were made. The records of the officers and men will, therefore, be found in their places in the rolls of the One Hundred and Ninety-first, and such as left the service, or died before the consolidation, in an appendix to that regiment.”

== Casualties ==
The following is a partial assessment of casualties:

- Combat-related deaths (killed or mortally wounded): 31 enlisted men
- Disease-related deaths: 34 enlisted men

== Notable members ==
Abram Douglas Harlan initially cared for casualties of the war at Fortress Monroe before enrolling as a private with Company C of the Myers Independent Cavalry. He then enrolled with the 157th Pennsylvania on October 16, 1862, was commissioned as a first lieutenant and regimental quartermaster with the battalion's field and staff officers' corps on December 16, and was then honorably discharged on February 27, 1863. Post-war, he held a variety of clerkships with the Pennsylvania House of Representatives, the U.S. Internal Revenue Service, and the U.S. Customs Bureau office in Philadelphia, and was then elected to the Pennsylvania Senate in 1883. Twice re-elected, he served until 1892.

John Wallace Scott was wounded in action multiple times while serving with the 157th Pennsylvania, and was then awarded the U.S. Medal of Honor for his gallantry during the Battle of Five Forks, Virginia on April 1, 1865. Although his citation states that his actions took place while he was a member of the 157th Pennsylvania, that particular act of valor actually occurred after his regiment had been merged into the 191st Pennsylvania.

Two men were assigned as color-bearers for the 157th Pennsylvania:

- Corporal William H. Howard, Co. A (regimental color-bearer, February 5, 1865)
- Sergeant Francis A. Olmstead (regimental color-bearer, 1866)

== See also ==
- 191st Pennsylvania Infantry
- List of Pennsylvania Civil War regiments
- Pennsylvania in the American Civil War
