= Everhart Park =

Public park in West Chester, Pennsylvania, US

Coordinates: 39°57′14″N 75°36′43″W

Everhart Park is a public park in West Chester, Pennsylvania. It was the Borough of West Chester's second public park, created in 1905. It is maintained by the West Chester Department of Parks and Recreation.

== Geography ==
Everhart Park has an area of 10.2 acres (4.1 ha) and is located on the western side of West Chester, bordering East Bradford Township. It is bounded by Brandywine Street to the east, Union Street to the south, Bradford Avenue to the west, and Miner Street to the north. Blackhorse Run, a tributary of Brandywine Creek, has its source in the park. Everhart Park is at an elevation of 400 feet (120 m).

== History ==
Everhart Park was part of the property of notable resident William Everhart, who named the park Everhart Grove. It was used for political rallies in the 1840s and 1850s as well as community gatherings. During the Civil War, the West Chester Volunteer Regiment trained at the park, and veterans used the site for physical fitness after the war.

Dr. Isaiah Fawkes Everhart donated the park to the borough in 1905. As part of a beautification project due to destruction of the land, the gazebo was built in 1908. The following year, a pond was constructed and rare trees were planted. The pond was drained in 1943 and wetlands were formed. In 1989, the Friends of Everhart Park was formed after a utility pipeline was proposed that would have eliminated nearly 20 ancient hardwood trees.

== Amenities ==
Everhart Park features an activity building, basketball court, and footbridge for recreation. For outdoor eating, there is a gazebo, grill, and picnic tables. Restrooms and a water fountain are available in the park. The park contains a playground, which includes swing sets, an infinity loop climber, a dragon challenge climber, a see-saw snake, a double chute slide, and a fire engine composite play structure.

== Events ==
A number of events take place in the park. There are art camps and a summer camp from June to August. An Easter Egg hunt, with more than 13,000 plastic eggs hidden, is held on Easter and attracts hundreds of children. The May Day Festival for the Arts is held annually on the first Sunday in May. The Turks Head Music Festival is held annually on the third Sunday in July. Shakespeare in the Park and a plant sale are also held often in Everhart Park.
