= William Ward (Pennsylvania politician) =

American politician

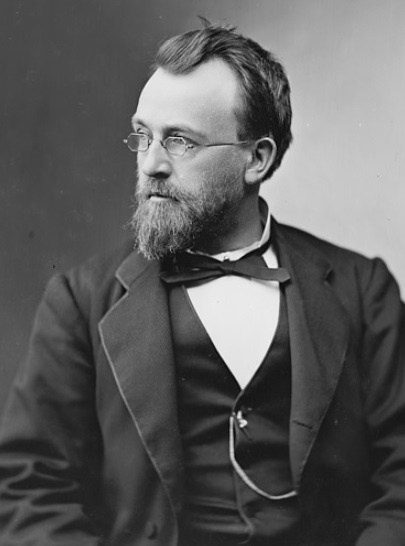

Member of the U.S. House of Representatives from Pennsylvania's 6th district
- In office March 4, 1877 to March 3, 1883
- Preceded by: Washington Townsend
- Succeeded by: James B. Everhart

Personal details
- Born: January 1, 1837 Philadelphia, Pennsylvania, United States
- Died: February 27, 1895 (aged 58) Chester, Pennsylvania
- Party: Republican
- Profession: Real estate, Lawyer

William Ward (January 1, 1837 – February 27, 1895) was an American politician from Pennsylvania who served as a Republican member of the U.S. House of Representatives from Pennsylvania's 6th congressional district from 1877 to 1883.

== Life and career ==
William Ward was born in Philadelphia, Pennsylvania. He attended Girard College in Philadelphia. He learned the art of printing in the office of the Delaware County Republican in Chester, Pennsylvania. He studied law, was admitted to the bar in August 1859 and commenced practice in Chester. He was also engaged in the land business and banking. He served as a member of the Chester City Council and city solicitor.

=== Congress ===
Ward was elected as a Republican to the Forty-fifth, Forty-sixth, and Forty-seventh Congresses. He was not a candidate for renomination in 1882.

=== Later career and death ===
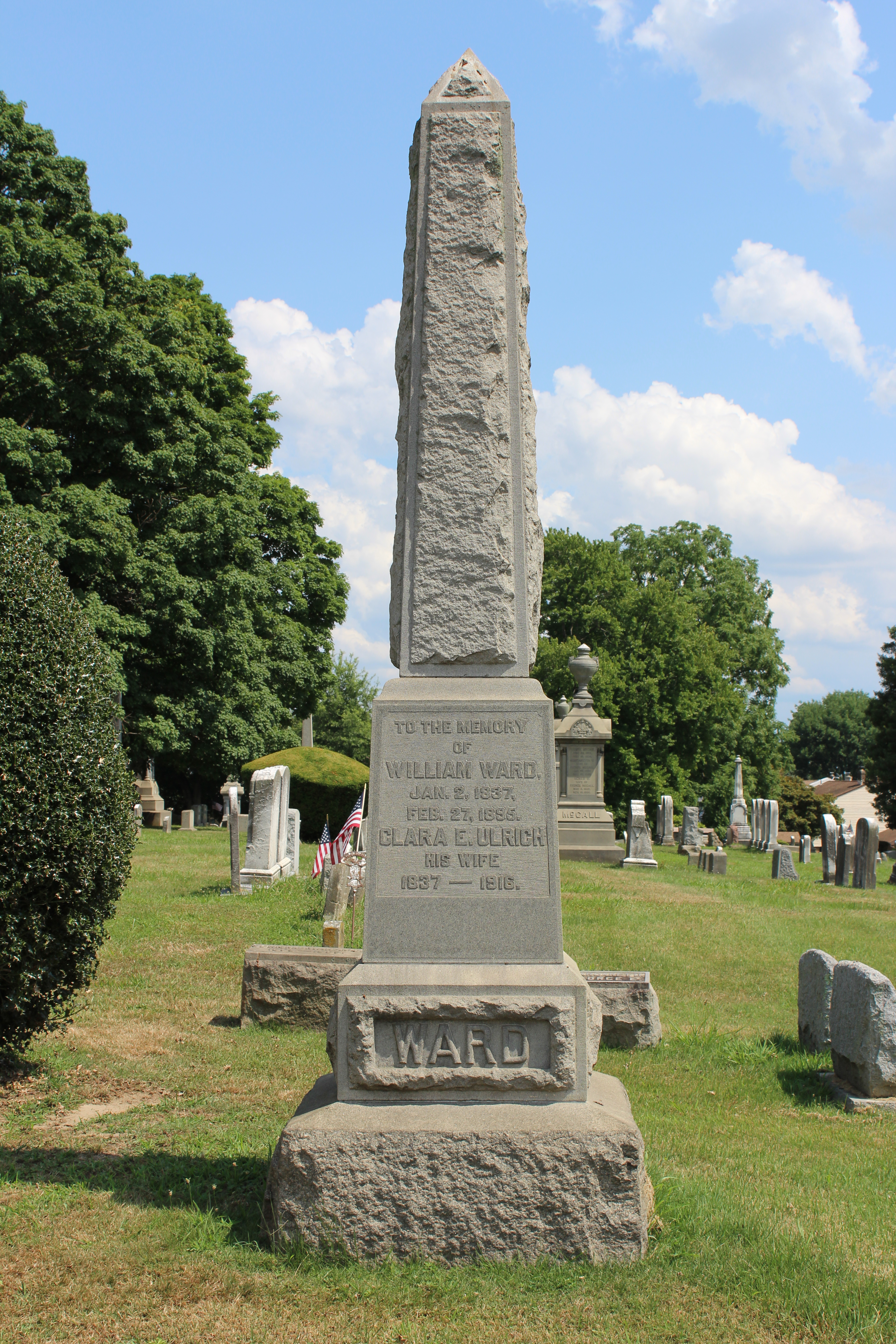
William Ward tombstone in Chester Rural Cemetery

He resumed the practice of his profession and his former business pursuits in Chester where he died in 1895. Interment in the Chester Rural Cemetery.

== Sources ==
- United States Congress. "William Ward (id: W000143)". Biographical Directory of the United States Congress.
- The Political Graveyard

U.S. House of Representatives
Preceded by Washington Townsend	Member of the U.S. House of Representatives from Pennsylvania's 6th congressional district 1877–1883	Succeeded by James B. Everhart
