= William Everhart House =

Historic house in Pennsylvania, United States

- U.S. National Register of Historic Places
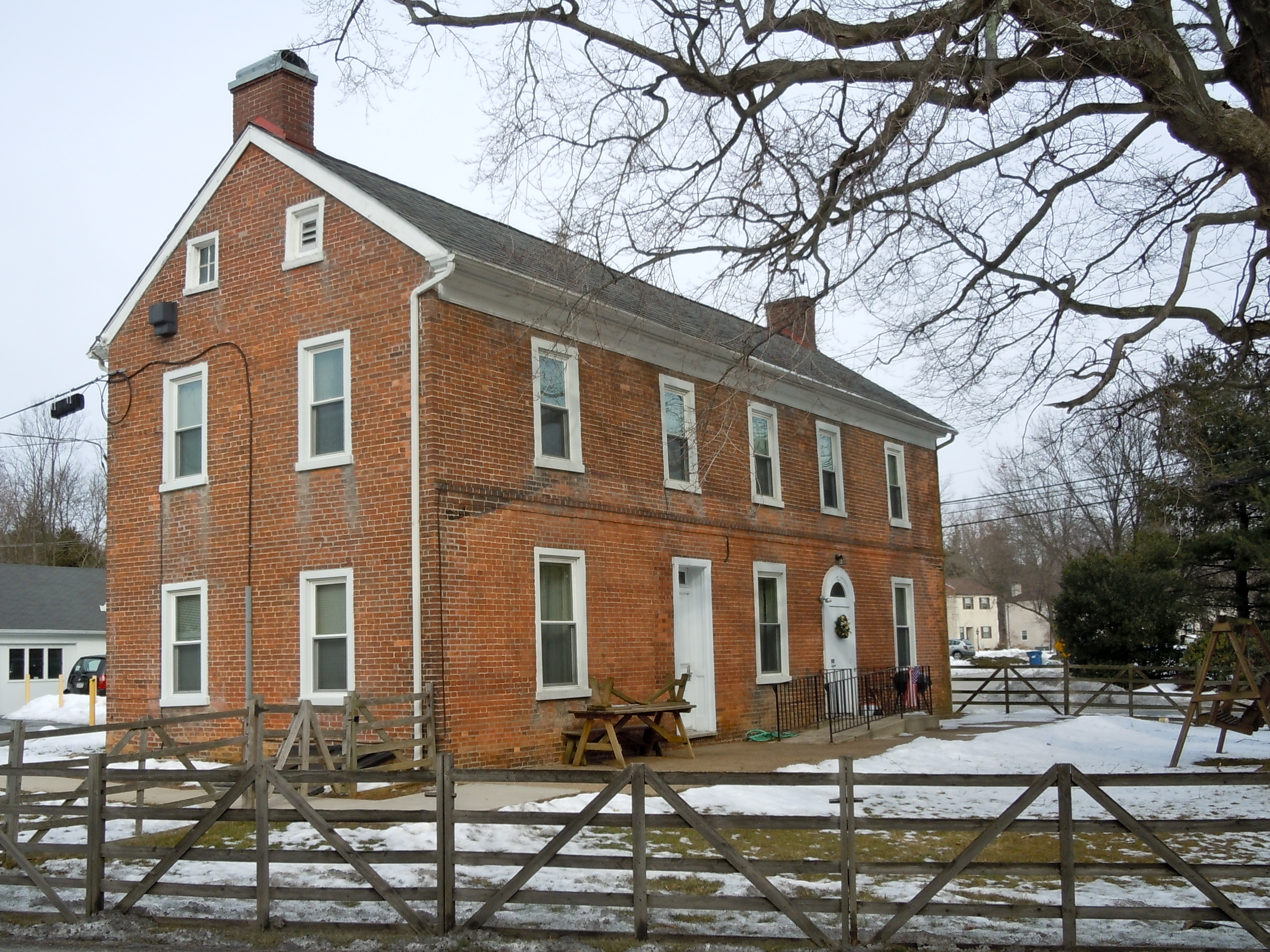
- William Everhart House, January 2011

- Location within Pennsylvania Location within the United States
- Location: S. Ship and Boot Rds., West Whiteland Township
- Coordinates: 40°0′34″N 75°35′38″W
- Area: less than one acre
- Built: c. 1810
- Architectural style: Federal
- NRHP reference No.: 84003249
- Added to NRHP: August 2, 1984

The William Everhart House is an historic home that is located in West Whiteland Township, Chester County, Pennsylvania, United States.

It was listed on the National Register of Historic Places in 1984.

== History and architectural features ==
Built circa 1810, this historic structure is a two-story, five-bay, brick, Federal-style dwelling with a gable roof. It measures fifty feet by twenty-one feet, and features two entrances, one with a fanlight. It was the home of Congressman William Everhart (1785-1868), who also built the William Everhart Buildings in West Chester.
