= John Wallace Scott =

U.S. Federal soldier for the American Civil War

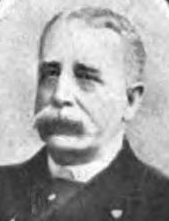
- Bvt. Maj. John Wallace Scott, c. 1903
- Born: August 31, 1832; Valley Township, Chester County, Pennsylvania
- Died: May 12, 1903 (aged 70); Philadelphia, Pennsylvania
- Burial place: Upper Octorara Church Cemetery, Parkesburg, Pennsylvania
- Military career
- Allegiance: United States of America
- Branch: United States Army
- Rank: Captain
- Units: 30th Pennsylvania Infantry (sergeant, Company A); 157th Pennsylvania Infantry (captain, company D); 191st Pennsylvania Infantry (captain)
- Conflicts: American Civil War: Seven Days Battles; Battle of Beaver Dam Creek; Battle of Gaines's Mill; Battle of Savage's Station; Battle of Glendale; Battle of Malvern Hill; Second Battle of Bull Run; Battle of South Mountain; Battle of Antietam; Siege of Petersburg; Battle of Five Forks
- Awards: Medal of Honor

John Wallace Scott, also known as J. Wallace Scott (August 31, 1832 – May 12, 1903), was a United States soldier who fought with the Union Army as a member of several Pennsylvania infantry units during the American Civil War. Severely wounded during the Siege of Petersburg in 1864, he was recognized for his meritorious service less than eight months later with his nation's highest award for bravery, the U.S. Medal of Honor, for capturing the enemy's flag while serving as captain of Company D of the 157th Pennsylvania Infantry during the Battle of Five Forks, Virginia on April 1, 1865. That award was conferred on April 27, 1865.

== Formative years ==
Born in Valley Township, Chester County, Pennsylvania on August 31, 1832 (alternate birth year: 1835), John Wallace Scott was a son of Pennsylvania natives Samuel Scott (1807–1884), a farmer, and Jane B. Scott (1807–1883). Documented on various records throughout his life as "J. Wallace Scott", "John W. Scott", "John Wallace Scott", and "Wallace Scott", J. Wallace Scott was reared in Chester County with siblings: Mary, Louisa and Caroline, who were born respectively circa 1835, 1839 and 1843, and Samuel W. (1845–1926). An older sister, Sarah B. Scott (1825–1829) died before he and his siblings born. Educated in that county's public schools, J. Wallace Scott then graduated from the Rockville Seminary. By 1850, he was working alongside his father on the family farm.

== Civil War ==
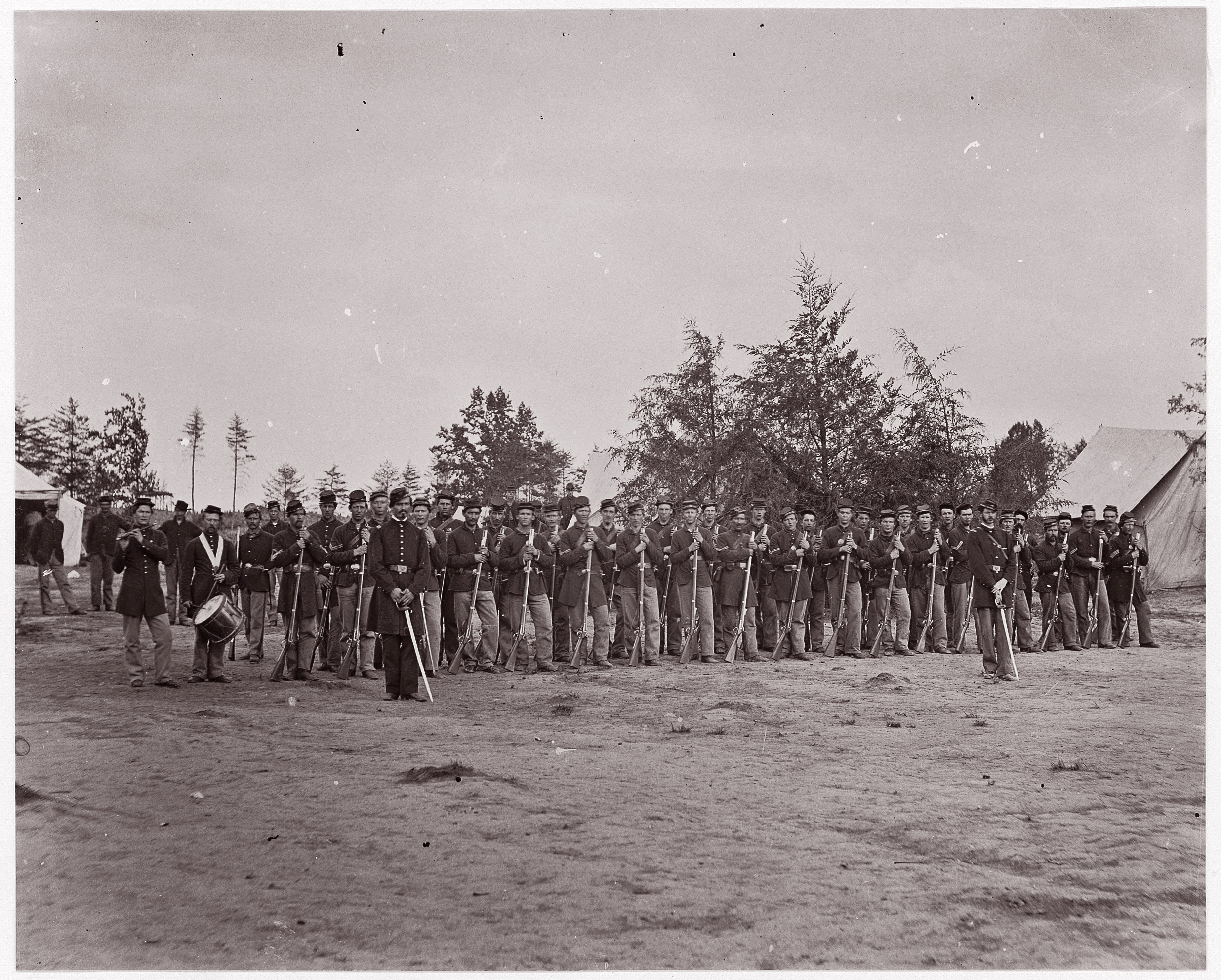
30th Pennsylvania Infantry/1st Pennsylvania Reserves (Virginia, circa 1861–1865).

Two months before his 29th birthday, J. Wallace Scott became one of Pennsylvania's early responders to President Abraham Lincoln's call for volunteers to defend Washington, D.C. following the April 1861 fall of Fort Sumter to the Confederate States Army. After enrolling for military service in West Chester on June 4, 1861, he mustered in as a private with Company A of the 1st Pennsylvania Reserve Regiment (also known as the 30th Pennsylvania Volunteer Infantry). Promoted to the rank of corporal early during his tenure of service, he and his men captured two enemy supply wagons while assigned to picket duties along an Annapolis Railroad line in Virginia in August 1861. Drawn by two horses each, the wagons were loaded with $5,000 worth of gold bullion and silk slated for use in CSA military uniforms and flags, as well as quinine supplies destined for CSA physicians. Engaged with his regiment in the Seven Days Battles near Richmond, Virginia from June 25 to July 1, 1862, including the battles of Beaver Dam Creek (June 26), Gaines's Mill (June 27), Savage's Station (June 29), Glendale (June 30), and Malvern Hill (July 1), he then fought in the Second Battle of Bull Run (August 28–30), and the battles of South Mountain (September 14) and Antietam (September 17). Advanced to the rank of sergeant, he was honorably discharged on October 23 in order to assume a new post with a different regiment.

Commissioned as a second lieutenant, he was assigned to the command staff of Company B, 157th Pennsylvania Infantry on garrison duty at Fort Delaware during the late fall and winter of 1862. On February 27, 1863, Scott was then advanced again in rank. Commissioned as a first lieutenant, he was also appointed as regimental adjutant with the 157th Pennsylvania, which was attached to Tyler's Division, 22nd Corps, and assigned to the defense of Washington, D.C. On May 29, 1864, Scott and his battalion were reassigned to the 2nd Brigade, 4th Division, 5th Army Corps of the Army of the Potomac, and ordered out on operations between North Anna and Cold Harbor, Virginia. Engaged in the battles of Bethesda Church (June 1–3) and Cold Harbor (June 1–12), the 157th Pennsylvania then participated in the Siege of Petersburg, including the Battle of the Crater (July 30). Attached to the 3rd Brigade, 2nd Division, 5th Army Corps beginning in August 1864, the 157th Pennsylvanians were then assigned to operations along the Weldon Railroad beginning August 18.

While engaged in those operations, Scott was wounded. Shot in the right foot by a musket ball on August 23, he also sustained a shrapnel wound to his left leg when an artillery shell exploded near him. Successfully treated for his injuries, he returned to his regiment, and was then advanced in rank again. Commissioned as a captain by Pennsylvania Governor Andrew Gregg Curtin on October 18, he was placed in charge of the 157th Pennsylvania's D Company.

From February 5 to 7, 1865, Scott led his men in the Battle of Hatcher's Run. Then, as part of a reorganization of Pennsylvania units, he and the other men from the 157th Pennsylvania were merged into the 191st Pennsylvania Infantry on March 21, 1865, and assigned to the Appomattox Campaign. Just over a week later, Scott performed the act of valor for which he would later be awarded the U.S. Medal of Honor. Engaged in hand-to-hand combat while leading his men in the Battle of Five Forks, Virginia on April 1, 1865, he captured the battle flag of the 16th South Carolina Infantry. He was also brevetted as a major for his meritorious service that day.

Scott was then honorably discharged from the 191st Pennsylvania on May 29, 1865.

== Post-war life ==
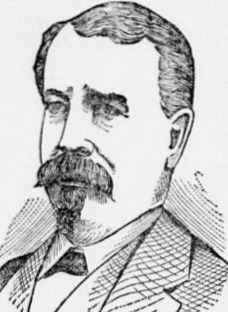
J. Wallace Scott, 1886.

Following his honorable discharge, Scott returned home to the Philadelphia area. On November 13, 1866, he wed Mary Roney Thomas (circa 1836 – early 1899) at the Coatesville Presbyterian Church in Coatesville, Pennsylvania. Their two children, Gertrude Thomas Scott and Henry Guest Thomas Scott (1872–1942) were born in Philadelphia, respectively, on November 17, 1867 and April 8, 1872.

Appointed to the appraisal department of the U.S. Customs House in Philadelphia on February 22, 1870, J. Wallace Scott was subsequently promoted several times. By November 1886, he held the title of entry clerk.

An active member of the Grand Army of the Republic's post number two, Scott was also a member of the Pennsylvania Commandery of the Military Order of the Loyal Legion of the United States (insignia #13441), and an honorary member of the "Old Bucktails" regimental association.

== Illness, death and interment ==
Preceded in death by his wife and diagnosed with heart and kidney disease, Scott fell ill with pneumonia in 1903, and died in Philadelphia, Pennsylvania on May 12. His grave is located in the Upper Octorara Church Cemetery in Parkesburg, Pennsylvania.

== Medal of Honor citation ==
Scott's Medal of Honor was awarded on April 27, 1865. His citation read as follows:

The President of the United States of America, in the name of Congress, takes pleasure in presenting the Medal of Honor to Captain (Infantry) John Wallace Scott, United States Army, for extraordinary heroism on April 1, 1865, while serving with Company D, 157th Pennsylvania Infantry, in action at Five Forks, Virginia, for capture of the flag of the 16th South Carolina Infantry, in hand-to-hand combat.

== See also ==
- List of American Civil War Medal of Honor recipients: Q–S
- Pennsylvania in the American Civil War
