= William Everhart Buildings =

- U.S. National Register of Historic Places
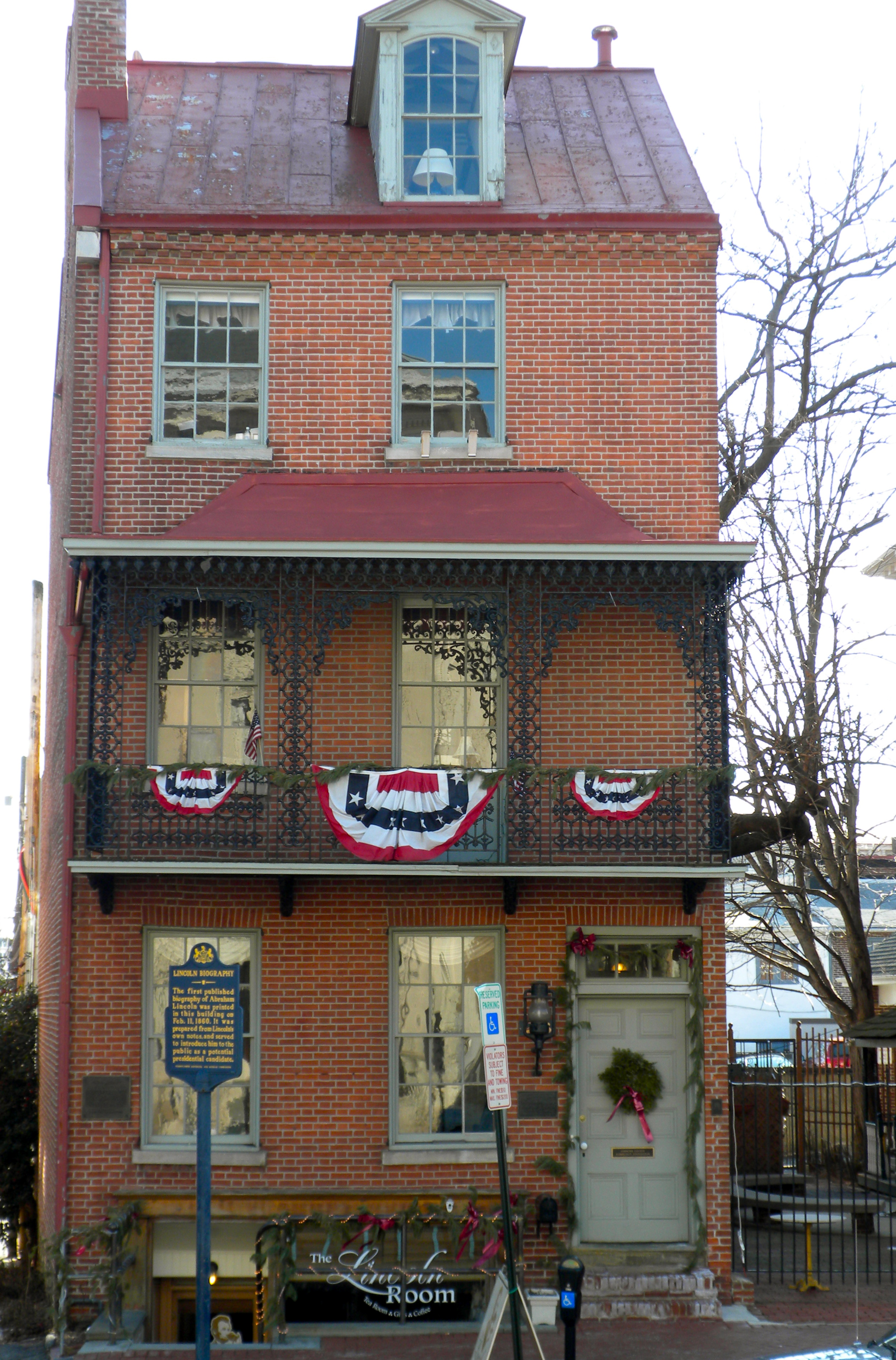
- William Everhart Buildings, January 2010

- Location within Pennsylvania Location within the United States
- Location: 28 W. Market St., West Chester, Pennsylvania
- Coordinates: 39.959216°N 75.605128°W
- Area: 0.1 acres (0.040 ha)
- Built: c. 1833
- Architectural style: Federal
- NRHP reference No.: 79002206
- Added to NRHP: July 17, 1979

The William Everhart Buildings, also known as the Everhart-Lincoln Building, is an historic commercial building complex that is located in West Chester, Chester County, Pennsylvania, United States.

It was listed on the National Register of Historic Places in 1979. The William Everhart House was listed in 1984.

== History and architectural features ==
Built by Congressman William Everhart (1785-1868) circa 1833, the historic commercial building is a three-story, three-bay, rectangular brick structure that was designed in the Federal style. It measures forty feet long and between twenty and twenty-five feet wide. The front facade features a hipped roof, second-story, wrought iron porch that was added in 1868. The building housed a number of printing concerns, most notably newspapers. It was the printing house where Abraham Lincoln's first biography was published on February 11, 1860, as an article in the Chester County Times.
