= William Everhart =

American politician (1785–1868)

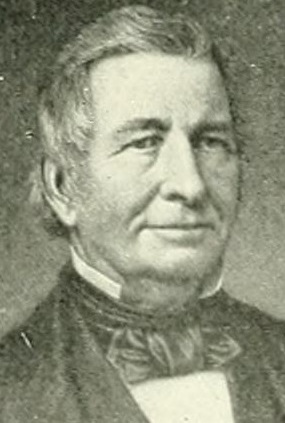
- Everhart in 1899's West Chester, Past and Present.

Member of the U.S. House of Representatives from Pennsylvania's 6th district
- In office March 4, 1853 – March 3, 1855
- Preceded by: Thomas Ross
- Succeeded by: John Hickman

Personal details
- Born: May 17, 1785 Chester County, Pennsylvania, U.S.
- Died: October 30, 1868 (aged 83) West Chester, Pennsylvania, U.S.
- Resting place: Oaklands Cemetery
- Party: Whig
- Spouse: Rebecca Matlack (m. 1814)
- Children: Benjamin and James
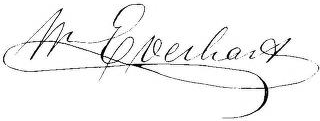
- Signature

William Everhart (May 17, 1785 – October 30, 1868) was an entrepreneur and wealthy businessman from Pennsylvania. He was responsible for developing much of West Chester and stimulating its economic growth. He was a member of the U.S. House of Representatives from 1853 to 1855.

== Biography ==
William Everhart was born in Chester County, Pennsylvania. His father, James Everhart, was a soldier in the Continental Army. He attended the common schools and became a civil engineer. Everhart served in the War of 1812 as captain of a company of riflemen. He was the only passenger saved from the packet ship Albion, wrecked off the coast of Ireland in 1822. Upon his return to Pennsylvania, he planned a large addition to the city of West Chester, Pennsylvania.

In the early 1800s, Everhart opened his first store in Pughtown, Pennsylvania, which sold general wares. On March 8, 1814, he married Rebecca Matlack of Goshen, granddaughter of one of the borough's first farmers. After finding success in Pughtown, he went on to open stores in Tredyffrin Township, West Goshen, and West Whiteland before opening a location in West Chester in 1824. Items he sold included fine cloths, silks, clothing, eye glasses, medicines, paints and oils, and liquors -– many imported from Europe.

In 1829, he purchased the 102-acre Wollerton Farm in West Chester, southwest of what is today the intersection of Market Street and Wimont Mews. In 1830, he built a family mansion on Miner Street, which still stands. He built the William Everhart Buildings in 1833, and resided at the William Everhart House in West Whiteland Township; they are both listed on the National Register of Historic Places.

By 1835, Everhart was by far the richest man in town, worth nearly twice as much as his nearest rival. In real estate alone, Everhart was worth approximately $70,000 (nearly $2,000,000 in 2015).

Everhart was elected to Congress as a Whig in 1852. He served in the 33rd Congress, 1853 to 1855. He was not a candidate for renomination in 1854.

His sons were scientist Benjamin Matlack Everhart and politician James Bowen Everhart. He died in West Chester on October 30, 1868, and is interred at Oaklands Cemetery.

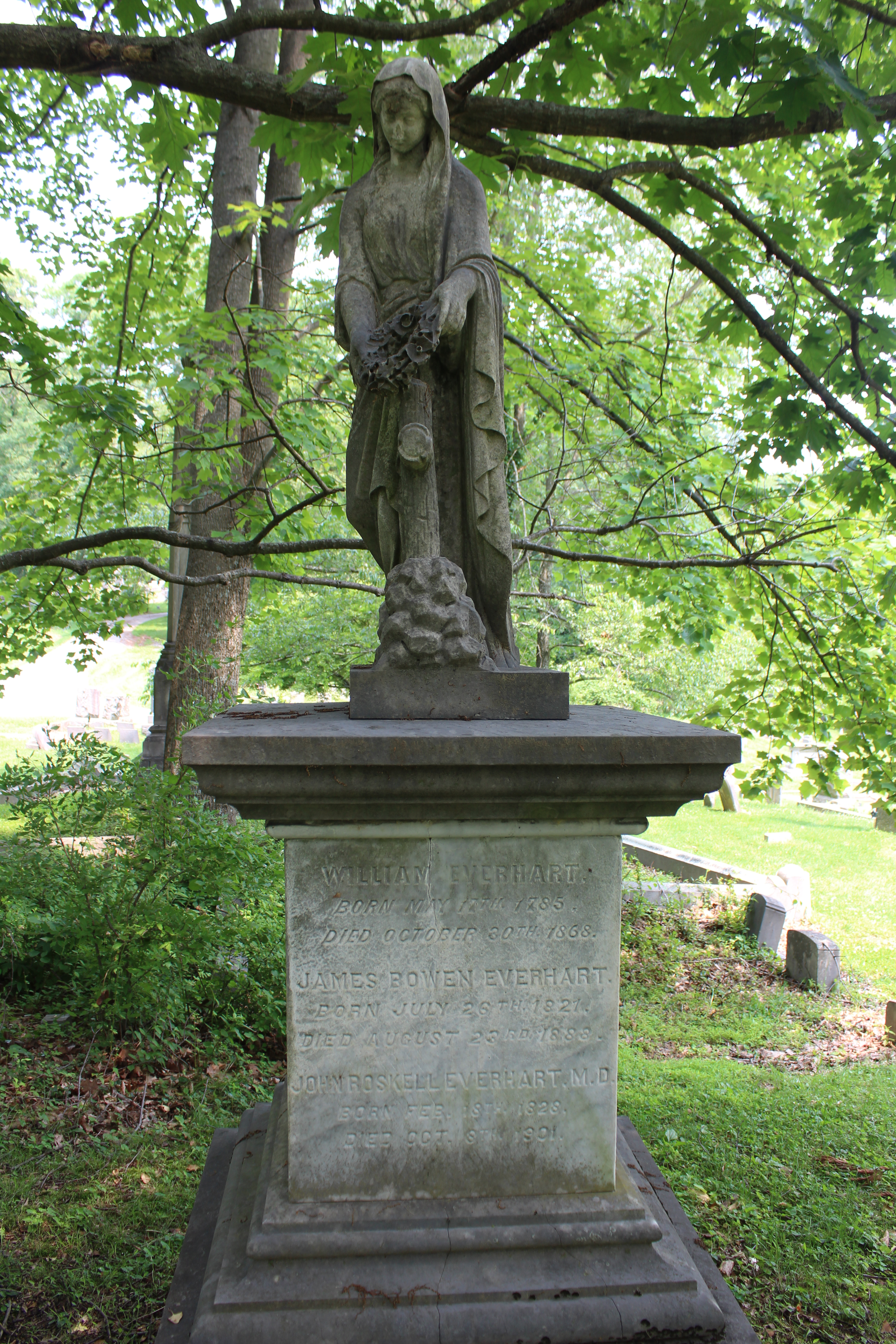
William Everhart tombstone at Oaklands Cemetery

== The Albion ==
Everhart sailed back and forth between New York and Liverpool, making sure that he had the best goods to sell. On April 1, 1822, he boarded the packet ship The Albion and set sail for Europe. On Sunday, April 21, the ship reached Cape Clear but encountered thick fog and strong southward winds. Though the crew shortened the sails, a "strong and sudden squall" carried away one of the main sails and tore another. As night approached, there was a lull in the wind, and the crew set about repairing the damage. They were not free of the storm, however, as later that night a large wave struck the ship and destroyed the main mast.

After hours of battling the rough seas, the remaining crew spotted the "Old Head at Kinsale" lighthouse displaying their proximity to land. Washing into the rocky cliffs of Ireland, the ship was damaged even more. Climbing from the nearly vertical section of The Albion that was still afloat, Everhart planted himself on the cliffside and waited for rescue. After several hours of waiting, local residents located the wreck and pulled Everhart to safety. Of the 54 total members on the ship upon departure, only 9 survived–8 crew members and 1 passenger: William Everhart.

== Religion ==
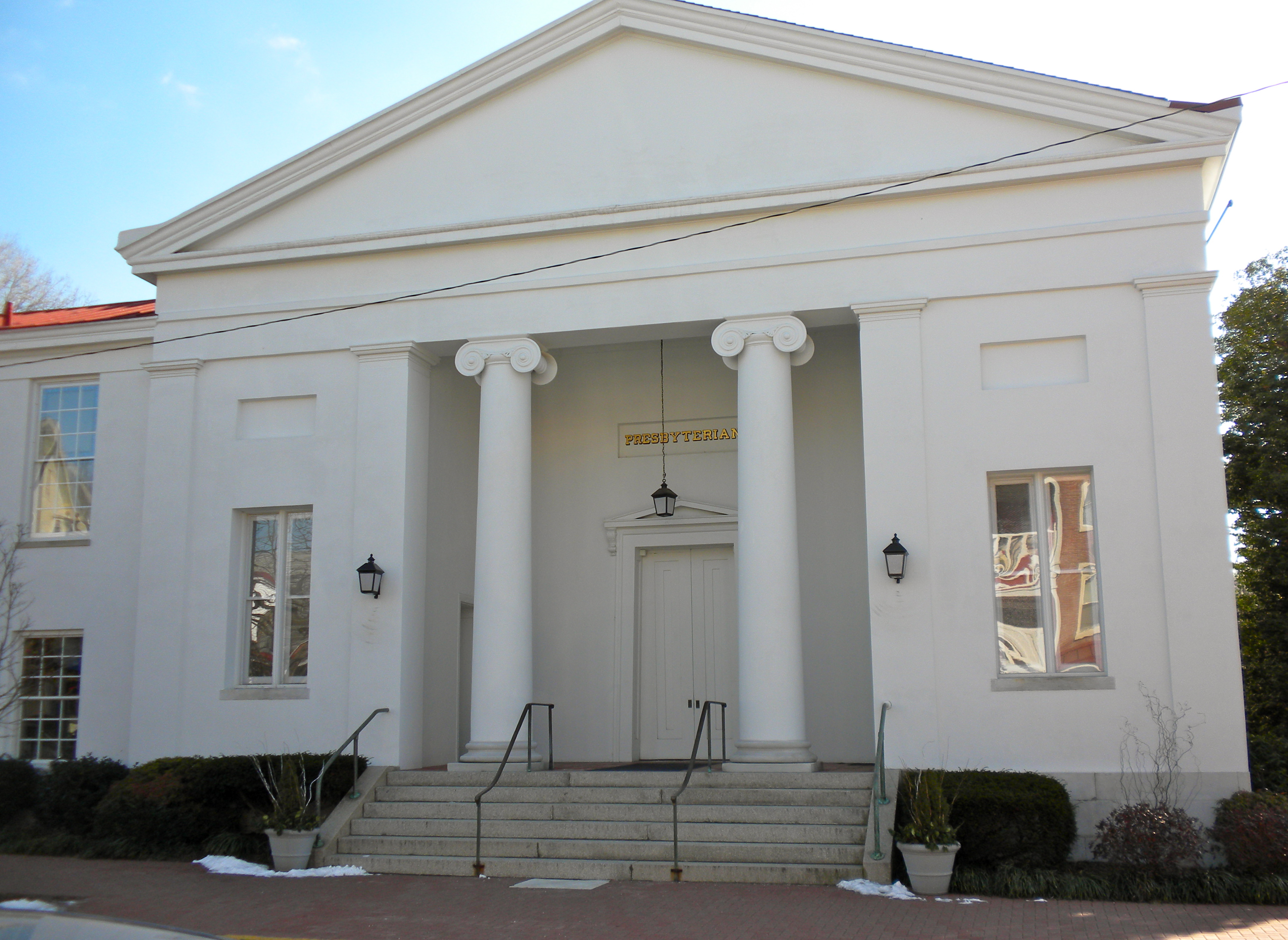
The First Presbyterian Church of West Chester was designed by Thomas U. Walter and opened in January 1834.

Originally an average Christian, after surviving the wreck of The Albion, Everhart gained a new appreciation for religion. Upon attending Presbyterian sermons held by Reverend William A. Stevens outside of the West Chester Courthouse, Everhart became both a convert and a supporter. Religious devotion led him towards abolitionism.

Agreeing with Stevens that their congregation needed a physical foundation to grow around, Everhart offered a lot from his development, directly across the street from his mansion on Minor Street, selling it to the Presbyterians for $420. Many of the wealthy members of West Chester chipped in, including members with no relation to Presbyterianism such as David Townsend, Orthodox Quaker Judge Isaac Darlington, and his deistic cousin Dr. William Darlington. Thomas Ustick Walter designed the church, and the first cornerstone was laid July 3, 1832. The First Presbyterian Church of West Chester was completed in January 1834, providing Everhart and the rest of the local Presbyterian faith a place to grow.

== Politics ==
Everhart was a member of the Whig Party. As he became wealthier and more established, he also became more involved in politics. Everhart served as West Chester's Chief Burgess in 1836 and 1837, and was elected to Congress as a Whig in 1852. He served in the 33rd Congress from 1853 to 1855. He was also a strong supporter of abolitionism, as well as an avid member of the American Colonization Society. On May 19, 1854, he delivered his only speech as a House member. In this speech, he addressed the proposal of the Nebraska and Kansas Bill—a bill which called for popular sovereignty in territory that was previously barred slavery.

In 1833, Henry Cooper was arrested in West Chester under the existing fugitive slave laws. Judge Isaac Darlington oversaw the court case. When Cooper was found guilty and ordered to return to slavery, Everhart, along with numerous other Cestrian abolitionist residents, contributed various amounts from $3 to $10, purchasing Cooper's freedom for $300.

== Notes and references ==
U.S. House of Representatives
Preceded by Thomas Ross	Member of the U.S. House of Representatives from Pennsylvania's 6th congressional district 1853–1855	Succeeded by John Hickman
