= Everhart Museum =

Art and natural history museum in Scranton, Pennsylvania, U.S.

Coordinates: 41.4006°N 75.6442°W

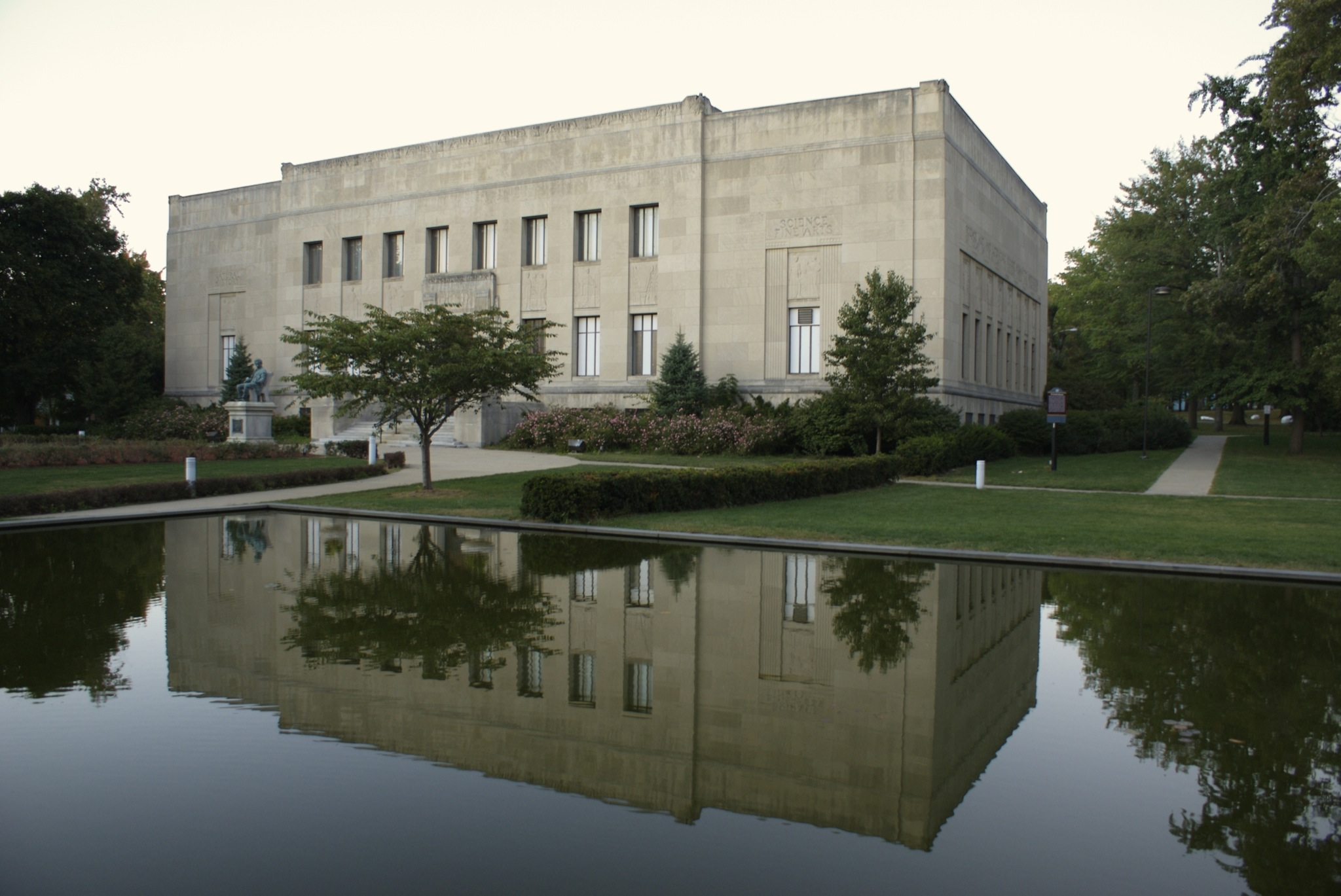
- Everhart Museum
- Established: 1908
- Location: 1901 Mulberry Street; Nay Aug Park, Scranton, Pennsylvania
- Type: Art, natural history
- Website: www.everhart-museum.org

The Everhart Museum of Natural History, Science & Art is a non-profit art and natural history museum located in Nay Aug Park in Scranton, Pennsylvania, United States. It was founded in 1908 by Dr. Isaiah Fawkes Everhart, a local medical doctor and skilled taxidermist. Many of the specimens in the museum's extensive ornithological collection came from Dr. Everhart's personal collection.

In addition to the zoological displays, the permanent collection includes works of visual art (many by Northeastern Pennsylvanian artists), ethnological artifacts, and fossils. The museum has an excellent permanent display of American folk art.

== History ==
=== Founding ===
The Everhart Museum of Natural History, Science & Art was founded by Dr. Isaiah Everhart, a Scranton-area philanthropist and ornithological enthusiast. When the museum opened its doors on May 30, 1908, there were only eight other public museums found in the Commonwealth, none of which were located in Northeastern Pennsylvania. Dr. Everhart's gift to the City of Scranton was intended to bring the world to his community. His goal was to create an institution that would “educate and delight for generations to come.”

Following military service as a surgeon during the Civil War, Dr. Everhart conceived the idea of assembling a comprehensive collection of Pennsylvania's native birds and animals. A skilled taxidermist, he built a collection of mounted specimens which soon expanded into one of the finest and largest collections in the United States. In 1905, he composed a will specifying that funds from his estate be used to construct the "Dr. I.F. Everhart general museum to be built in Nay Aug Park in the City of Scranton, Pennsylvania," and that additional funds were to be used for an endowment to support such an institution. Dr. Everhart continued to collect specimens and three years after his will was prepared recognized the need to build the museum during his lifetime. In 1907 he publicly announced that he would provide funds and guidance for the creation of a museum "for the young and old of this generation and for all of those who follow after ... for their pleasure and education." Plans in the "modern Renaissance" style were made by Scranton architects Harvey J. Blackwood and John Nelson. Construction soon began and the original core building of the Everhart Museum was dedicated on Memorial Day, May 30, 1908. At that time, the museum's collections primarily consisted of Dr. Everhart's ornithological specimens.

In honor of the museum's founder, a bronze statue of Dr. Everhart and Lake Everhart were dedicated on May 20, 1911. Dr. Everhart died just five days later on May 25, 1911. Although Dr. Everhart's original plan called for "three buildings forming three sides of a square, one for natural history, one for science, one for art," the Everhart Museum Trustees instead added two wings to the original building and wrapped the whole in a stripped classical facade. Construction was completed in 1929; the designs were by the Scranton architects David H. Morgan and Searle von Storch. In 1962, a new small gallery was built in the basement, where regular changing exhibits could be displayed. During the 1980s the entire upper floor of the museum was renovated to accommodate the permanent collections and to create a suite of temporary exhibition galleries.

=== Governance questions (1980s-1990s) ===
In the late 1980s and early '90s, the question of governance was becoming an issue for the Everhart. Funding sources, e.g. The Pennsylvania Council on the Arts, questioned the efficiency of the County Judges as trustees for a public, non-profit institution. In 1910, Dr. Everhart deemed the judges as the most "trustworthy" sector of the community to govern his newly created museum. During that period, the judges as the Board of Trustees watched over the museum's operations with various degrees of interest and participation. Judges changed and the level of their time constraints and overall interest did not always formulate an atmosphere for a solid managerial foundation. Protocol precluded the judges from raising money from private parties and over the years various auxiliary groups helped in an assortment of ways to bring funding to the Everhart by holding a variety of events. Naturally, those volunteers eventually wanted to participate in determining the use of the money raised. The ideas put forth by the workers on these occasions failed to always meet the approval of the trustees. Without any meaningful input in the museum's operation, the motivation for continued support by disenfranchised volunteers waned and the museum become out of the focus of the region's citizens.

At the time, Robert N. Lettieri, a Scranton native, and longtime supporter of the arts, was serving on the Executive Committee of the Pennsylvania Council of the Arts under Governor Robert P. Casey. The PCA panels, evaluating Everhart grant requests, questioned the anachronistic governance of the Everhart by the county judges. They felt their trusteeship was hindering the potential and progress to move forward. The PCA, as a major funder for the Everhart, anticipated that they could no longer guarantee continued support without the museum helping themselves through other funding channels. The PCA encouraged Mr. Lettieri to investigate the possibility of amending the will of Dr. Everhart in order to form a community board of directors. Mr. Lettieri approached the then-museum director, Kevin O'Brien, on the subject. Mr. O'Brien met with the judges on a regular basis, and Mr. Lettieri asked to be included in order to make a proposal to them.

Without hesitation, the judges welcomed the idea and were receptive to Mr. Lettieri's point of view. The meeting was attended by all but one of the judges, and accepted the basic premise of the presentation. They agreed to have Mr. Lettieri back the following month for a further review. Subsequently, the judges asked Mr. Lettieri form a community board from his experience with leaders in the arts and business community. The initial responsibilities of the board would be to manage the full operation of the museum for 2 years except for the approval of the budget and the engaging of the museum director. After the two-year period the judges would then evaluate the museum's status before going to court to officially modify Dr. Everhart's will.

During that period, the museum's board began to evaluate the entire operation of all museum programs and the condition of the collections and the infrastructure. The long absence of consistent leadership and funding painted a picture of deficiencies on all levels. It appeared that the museum was on the verge of closing without a resurgence of support from the entire region.

At the end of the two-year period, board member Robert Munley and his firm drafted the necessary documents to be presented the Orphans Court of Lackawanna County for the amending of Dr. Everhart's will. There was no hesitation on the part of the court, and the community board officially became the trustees of the Everhart Museum. Mr. Lettieri was the founding president of the first Community Board and served for three years.

=== Matisse controversy ===
In a controversy that aroused national attention in museum circles, in the mainstream press and among certain members of the general public, the Everhart tried several times during the 1990s and early 2000s to sell their lone Matisse painting Pink Shrimp. The painting had been donated in the 1960s by Adele Levy from her collection. The intent was to put well-known artists in the collections of smaller museums, and to give these museum communities an opportunity to see works otherwise not available to them. Prior to the formation of the Community Board in the early 1990s, the Everhart had a series of directors during the 1990s and early 2000s who often had no previous museum experience and no education or background in the fine arts, which resulted in years of mismanagement that put the museum in dire financial condition. The issue came to a head in 2001-02 when then-curator Bruce Lanning refused an order from the Everhart's Board of Trustees directing him to pack up the Matisse to be shipped to Sotheby's where it was to be offered in a public auction, a move that cost him his position at the Everhart.

The newly created Community Board felt that, while the ownership of a Matisse gave the museum a limited amount of prestige, the museum would better serve the spirit of Ms. Levy's gift by creating an endowment from its sale to acquire a wider variety of works and exhibitions. It was an acceptable museum practice to deaccession works not consistent with its current collections. With board approval, the Matisse was offered for auction at Sotheby's but did not make the reserve of $1 million. Later, a deal was struck with a private buyer for a net amount of $1 million which was placed in a separate endowment fund for acquisitions and exhibitions. The Scranton Times lamented the loss of the city's "masterpiece."

=== Stolen works ===
On November 17, 2005, two works, a Jackson Pollock painting and pop artist Andy Warhol's 1984 Le Grande Passion, were stolen in a robbery involving ladders and a careful plan of attack. Despite efforts to retrieve the works by both the FBI and the Scranton police, nothing has been returned to the museum. After the theft there was some controversy relating to the origin of the Pollock. The Everhart Museum released a statement saying museum officials believed the stolen painting was an authentic Jackson Pollock and the painting's owner lent it in good faith. The museum's insurance broker called the Pollock piece a fake after appraisers could not authenticate it.

The Everhart continues to identify the painting as Pollock's 1949 Springs Winter. The lender of the work said the correct title is Winter in Springs.

The from 2019 onward the FBI arrested and charged a group of 10 men for robbing the Everhart and other museums.

== Collections ==
The Everhart Museum's collections include approximately 20,000 objects, with roughly half focused on the humanities and including fine arts (paintings, works on paper and sculpture), ethnographic collections (Native American, Oceania, South American and Asian), ancient civilizations, African art, American folk art, local/regional history and decorative arts (Dorflinger glass is a large component of this collection). The remaining half of the collection is focused on natural science specimens, including fossils, birds, mammals, reptiles, fish, minerals, insects, shells and herbaria. The natural science collection often features in exhibit development, as the natural world is frequently the subject of artistic inspiration, and the collections are used as a resource by artists and children alike.

=== Natural science ===
The natural science collection includes regional specimens, as well as examples from environments around the world. The ornithological collection includes 2,300 specimens, a number of which are on display in the museum's Bird Gallery. The mammal collection consists of approximately 400 specimens that include primates, regional fauna and tropical animals. The fish, reptile and amphibian collections number approximately 285 items. The museum's shell collection has 3,500 specimens and there are 800 pieces in the mineral collection. The fossil collection has 300 pieces, some of which are on display in the Life Through Time Gallery. The entomological collection includes approximately 300 specimens of Lepidoptera (butterflies and moths) and Coleoptera (beetles). In 1913, Alfred Twining, the Associate Editor of the Scranton Times and foremost botanist in the region, donated his Herbarium to the museum that comprises 2100 specimens.

=== Fine art ===
The fine art collection consists of nineteenth-century paintings by nationally and locally recognized artists, works on paper, contemporary prints and paintings, a small collection of European paintings and classical and modern sculpture. The ancient civilizations collection (500 pieces) consists of ancient Egyptian funerary objects, Roman glass and bronze objects, sculpture, coins, seals and jewelry. The ethnographic collections (4000 pieces) include ceramics, textiles, religious objects, and arms. The African art (500 pieces) collection comprises masks, figures, arms, tools and textiles.

=== Americana and folk art ===
The Americana and folk art collection contains paintings, works on paper, sculpture, textile arts and furniture. It was in 1934 that Mr. and Mrs. John Law Robertson lent significant pieces of American Folk Art for an exhibition at the Everhart Museum. Most of these collections were later acquired in the years 1946 to 1948 and these form the base of the extensive American Folk Art collection. Mrs. Robertson (whose actual full name has been difficult to determine, since she is always referenced publicly only as "Mrs. John Law Robertson") was one of the first individuals who exclusively dedicated time and money to develop on one of the seminal collections of folk art in the country. Her enthusiasm for folk art is recorded in letters from the museum archives where she explicitly states her commitment to and passion for art that was frequently ignored by institutions exclusively dedicated to “fine arts.” Mrs. Robertson, an area native, balked at the conventional, conservative trends of the art world in favor of what she deemed of value. Like other early folk art collectors, she sought American art outside the established halls of the academy, understanding the intrinsic beauty, the evident craftsmanship and the inherent history of these objects.

=== Decorative arts ===
The decorative arts collection includes ceramics, glass and furniture from Asia, Europe and America. Of special interest is the Dorflinger Glass which was produced in White Mills, Pennsylvania, from 1852 to 1921. The factory, founded by Christian Dorflinger, was renowned for its cut glass and stemware. The prestige of the factory was enhanced by its reputation for fine tableware that was sought after by eight American presidents, from Abraham Lincoln to Woodrow Wilson, and selected European royalty.
