= James B. Everhart =

American politician (1821–1888)

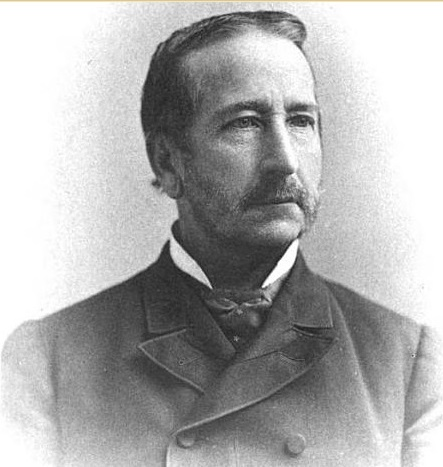
- Everhart in a 1889 publication

Member of the U.S. House of Representatives from Pennsylvania's 6th district
- In office March 4, 1883 – March 3, 1887
- Preceded by: William Ward
- Succeeded by: Smedley Darlington

Member of the Pennsylvania Senate from the 19th district
- In office 1876–1882
- Preceded by: Robert L. McClellan
- Succeeded by: Abram D. Harlan

Personal details
- Born: James Bowen Everhart; July 26, 1821 West Chester, Pennsylvania, U.S.
- Died: August 23, 1888 (aged 67) West Chester, Pennsylvania, U.S.
- Resting place: Oaklands Cemetery
- Party: Republican
- Parent: William Everhart (father)
- Relatives: Benjamin Matlack Everhart (brother)
- Education: Princeton University; Harvard Law School

James Bowen Everhart (July 26, 1821 – August 23, 1888) was an American politician from Pennsylvania who served as a Republican member of the U.S. House of Representatives for Pennsylvania's 6th congressional district from 1883 to 1887. He also served as a member of the Pennsylvania State Senate for the 19th district from 1876 to 1882.

== Biography ==
James Bowen Everhart was born in West Whiteland Township, Pennsylvania, to Hannah (née Matlack) and William Everhart. His father was a member of the U.S. Congress and worked as a surveyor and merchant. He attended Bolmar's Academy in West Chester and graduated from Princeton College in 1842. He studied law at Harvard Law School and in Philadelphia. He was admitted to the bar in 1845 and went abroad, spending two years in study at the Universities of Berlin and Edinburgh. He returned to West Chester and commenced practicing law. During the American Civil War, Everhart served in Company B, Tenth Regiment, Pennsylvania Militia. He represented the 19th district in the Pennsylvania State Senate from 1876 to 1882.

Everhart was elected as a Republican to the Forty-eighth and Forty-ninth Congresses. He was an unsuccessful candidate for renomination in 1886. He resumed the practice of law until his death.

== Writings ==
Everhart's writings, which are marked by terseness of style, include Miscellanies, in prose (West Chester, Pa, 1862); a volume of short poems (Philadelphia, 1868); and "The Fox Chase," a poem (Philadelphia, 1875).

== Personal life ==
His grandfather, James Everhart, was a soldier in the U.S. Army during the American Revolutionary War. His father William was a successful merchant in West Chester, Pennsylvania and a U.S. Congressman. His brother Benjamin Matlack Everhart was a mycologist.

Everhart died in West Chester on August 23, 1888. He was interred in Oaklands Cemetery in West Chester.

== Notes ==
Pennsylvania State Senate
Preceded by Robert L. McClellan	Member of the Pennsylvania Senate, 19th district 1876-1882	Succeeded by Abram D. Harlan
U.S. House of Representatives
Preceded by William Ward	Member of the U.S. House of Representatives from Pennsylvania's 6th congressional district 1883–1887	Succeeded by Smedley Darlington
