= Abram D. Harlan =

American politician (1833–1908)

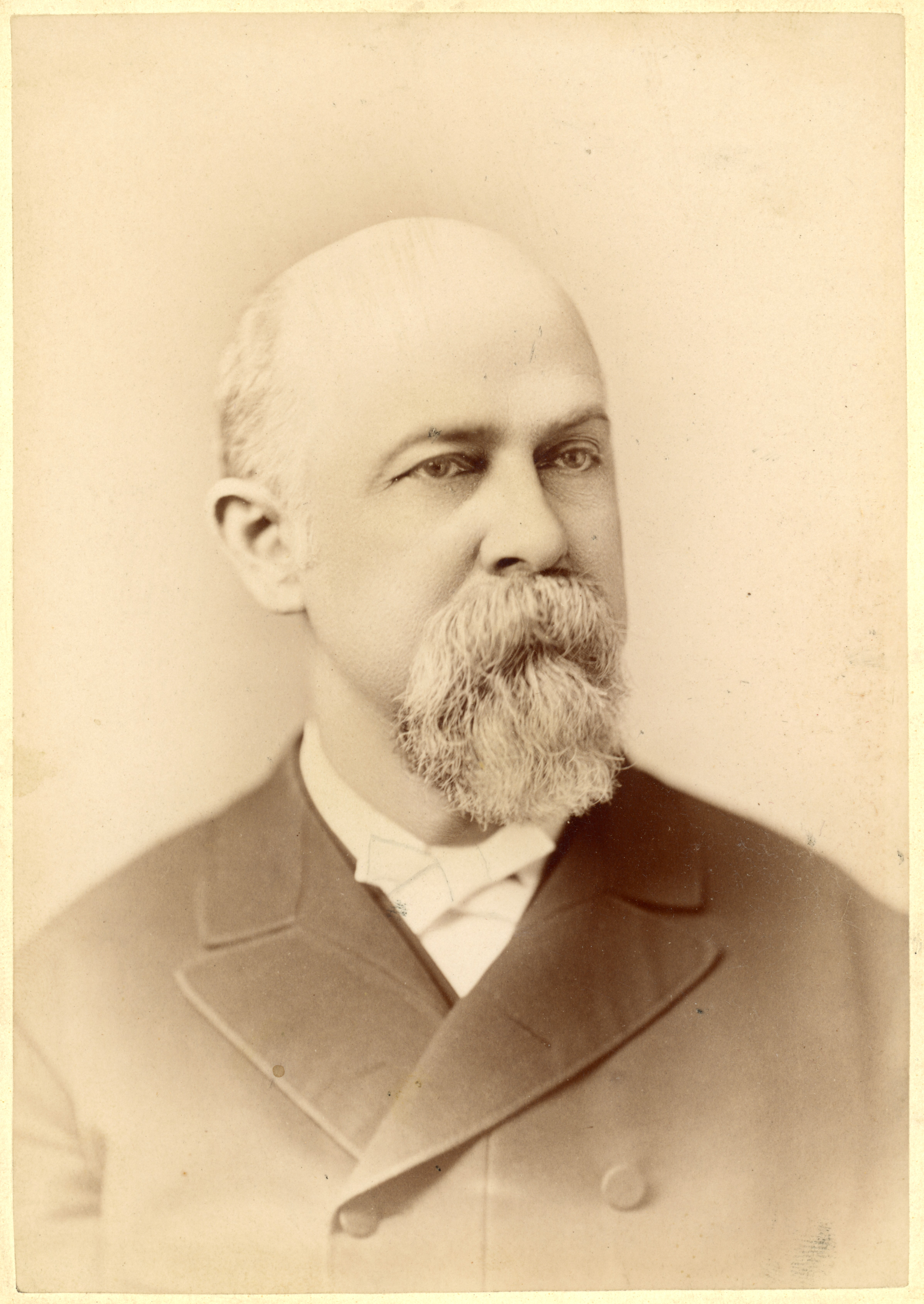

Member of the Pennsylvania Senate from the 19th district
- In office 1883 – June 29, 1891
- Preceded by: James B. Everhart
- Succeeded by: Septimus Evans Nivin

Personal details
- Born: Abram Douglas Harlan; September 3, 1833 West Marlborough Township, Pennsylvania, U.S.
- Died: June 1908 (aged 74) Wenonah, New Jersey, U.S.
- Resting place: Fairview Cemetery; Coatesville, Pennsylvania, U.S.
- Party: Republican
- Spouses: Elizabeth Boyd Scott (m. 1857; died 1883) Ellen Abigail Baldwin (m. 1885–1896) Olivia O. Wilcox (m. 1899)
- Children: 3
- Occupation: Politician; businessman

Abram Douglas Harlan (September 3, 1833 – June 1908) was an American politician from Pennsylvania. He served as a member of the Pennsylvania Senate from 1883 to 1891.

== Early life ==
Abram Douglas Harlan was born on September 3, 1833, to Elizabeth (née Buller) and Ezekial Harlan in West Marlborough Township, Pennsylvania. His father was a farmer. At the age of 11, his family moved to Coatesville. He was educated in public and private schools.

== Career ==
Harlan owned a general store in Coatesville. He operated it until 1862. In the spring of 1862, he worked in the Christian commission and provided care to the sick at Fort Monroe, Harrison Landing, Washington, D.C. and Antietam. He then enlisted as a private with the 157th Pennsylvania Infantry Regiment on October 16, 1862. He reached the rank of first lieutenant and regimental quartermaster. He served until he was discharged on February 27, 1863, in Harrisburg. He also worked in real estate.

Harlan was a member of the Coatesville School Board for 21 years. He helped start the Coatesville Building Association. He helped organize Fairview Cemetery.

Harlan was transcribing clerk of the Pennsylvania House of Representatives in 1864 and worked as message clerk from 1865 to 1867. In 1868, he helped secure the charter of the Coatesville Gas Company and in 1871, he served as its secretary. He was delegate of Chester County to the Republican State Convention in 1872. He worked as assistant clerk of the state constitutional convention from 1872 to 1873. He was clerk of the U.S. Internal Revenue Department under A. P. Tutton from 1872 to 1874. He was appointed deputy collector/assistant cashier of the Port of Philadelphia by Tutton. He served in that role from 1872 to 1882. In 1873, he edited and published Constitutional Convention of Pennsylvania, 1872 and 1873, its Members and Officers.

Harlan was a Republican. He was elected as a member of the Pennsylvania Senate, succeeding James B. Everhart in April 1883. He represented district 19 in the senate until he resigned on June 29, 1891. In June 1891, he was appointed as marshall of the U.S. Circuit Court Appeals, District 3 by Judge Joseph P. Bradley.

== Personal life ==
Harlan married three times. He married Elizabeth "Lizzie" Boyd Scott, daughter of Samuel W. Scott, on January 1, 1857. They had three children, Walter Lourie (1858–1858), Justin Edward (1860–1935) and Wallace Scott (1862–1924). His wife died in 1883. He married Ellen "Ella" Abigail (née Baldwin) Whyte, daughter of Abner Baldwin, on June 18, 1885, and she died in 1896. He married Olivia O. Wilcox in 1899. His son Justin was a dentist in China and in West Chester. His son Wallace was a banker in Coatesville. He was superintendent and elder of the Coatesville Presbyterian Church for about 40 years. He was elected elder of that church in 1871. In 1880, he was a commissioner to the Presbyterian General Assembly.

Harlan died on June 11, 1908, at his home in Wenonah, New Jersey. He was buried at Fairview Cemetery in Coatesville.
