= Isaiah Fawkes Everhart =

American physician and naturalist (1840–1911)

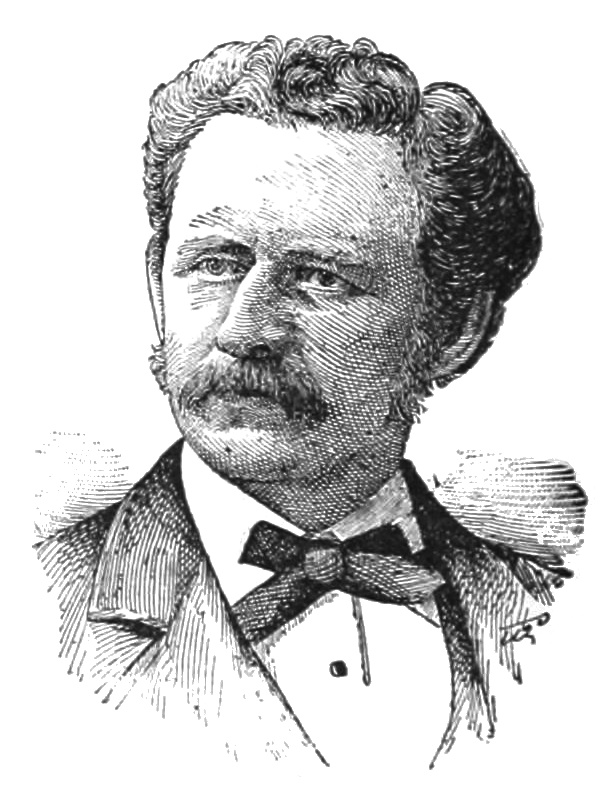
- Born: January 22, 1840; Berks County, Pennsylvania, US
- Died: May 26, 1911 (aged 71); Scranton, Pennsylvania, US
- Education: Franklin & Marshall College, University of Pennsylvania
- Occupations: Physician, naturalist
- Known for: Founder of the Everhart Museum in Scranton

Isaiah Fawkes Everhart (January 22, 1840 – May 26, 1911) was an American physician and naturalist who founded the Everhart Museum in Scranton, Pennsylvania.

== Early life and education ==
Everhart was born in Berks County, Pennsylvania, January 22, 1840, the youngest son of James and Mary Templin Everhart. He spent his early youth at the homestead, gaining his rudimentary education at the schools and academies of the neighborhood. At the age of seventeen he matriculated at Franklin & Marshall College, where he spent four years in the pursuit of a scientific course of study, giving special attention to the natural sciences. After his graduation he studied medicine, and, at the outbreak of the Civil War, entered the Satterlee General Hospital, then with 4,000 patients under the charge of Isaac Israel Hayes of Arctic exploration fame. Everhart graduated from the medical department of the University of Pennsylvania as a member of the class of 1862–63.

== Military service ==
Immediately upon graduation, Everhart went to the front as assistant surgeon of the 8th Pennsylvania Cavalry Regiment. He was present at thirty battles during the war, and in all discharged the duties of a full surgeon. On February 4, 1865, he received his promotion to full surgeon with the rank of major, and on the consolidation of his regiment with the 16th Pennsylvania Cavalry, was mustered surgeon of the joint body thus organized, and appointed surgeon of the military district of Lynchburg, Virginia, which position he held until mustered out of service on August 11, 1865.

== Later life and career ==
On his return from an extended tour through Europe in 1867, he settled at Scranton, Pennsylvania, where he successfully practiced his profession. He served as a member of the medical staff of the Lackawanna state hospital, a member of the Scranton Board of Health, and surgeon of the 9th regiment of the state militia.

In 1871 he married Annie Victoria Ubil. They had one son, Edwin Ellsworth Everhart, born in 1873.

== Everhart Museum ==
Everhart compiled an extensive and unique collection of birds and animals found within the state, which he personally collected and prepared, being not only an enthusiastic naturalist, but an expert taxidermist. In 1898 he returned from an extended tour through Mexico, the Pacific coast and Alaska, adding largely to his stock of specimens. In 1907, Everhart announced he would give the city of Scranton a natural history museum, and on May 30, 1908, the Isaiah Fawkes Everhart Museum of Natural History, Science and Art opened to the public.

Everhart died in Scranton on May 26, 1911, at the age of 71.
