= 13th Pennsylvania Reserve Regiment =

Union Army volunteer infantry regiment

- Pennsylvania flag
- Active: June 21st, 1861 to June 11th, 1864
- Country: United States
- Allegiance: Union
- Branch: Infantry
- Nicknames: 1st Pennsylvania Rifles, Kane's Rifles, Bucktails
- Engagements: Battle of Dranesville; Battle of Good's Farm; Battle of Cross Keys; Battle of Mechanicsville; Battle of Gaines' Mill; Battle of Savage's Station; Battle of Glendale; Battle of Malvern Hill; Battle of Second Bull Run; Battle of South Mountain; Battle of Antietam; Battle of Fredericksburg; Battle of Gettysburg; Mine Run Campaign; Battle of the Wilderness; Battle of Spotsylvania Courthouse

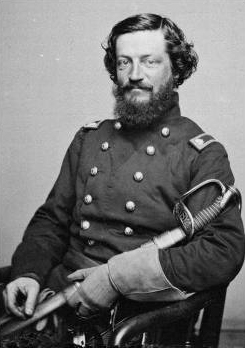
Col. Thomas L. Kane

The Thirteenth Pennsylvania Reserve Regiment, also known as the 42nd Pennsylvania Volunteer Infantry, the 1st Pennsylvania Rifles, Kane's Rifles, or simply the "Bucktails," was a volunteer infantry regiment that served in the Union Army during the American Civil War. It was a part of the famed Pennsylvania Reserve division in the Army of the Potomac for much of the early and middle parts of the war, and served in the Eastern Theater in a number of important battles, including Antietam, Fredericksburg, and Gettysburg.

The "Rifles" designation was a holdover from the days when soldiers who carried rifled weapons wore a special outfit, and the Bucktails carried breech-loading Model 1859 Sharps Rifles, normally only issued to sharpshooters.

== History ==
=== Organization ===
Company	Earliest Moniker	Primary Location of Recruitment	Captains
A	The Anderson Guards	Tioga County	Phillip Holland; John G. Harrower
B	The Morgan Rifles	Perry County	Langhorne Wister; Thomas B. Lewis
C	The Cameron Rifles	Cameron County	John A. Eldred; Leander W. Gifford; Neri B. Kinsey
D	The Raftsman's Guards	Warren County	Roy Stone; Hugh McNeil; John T.A. Jewett; David G. McNaughton
E	The Tioga Rifles	Tioga County	Alanson E. Niles; Samuel A. Mack
F	The Irish Infantry	Carbon County	Dennis McGee; John A. Wolfe
G	The Elk Rifles	Elk County	Hugh McDonald
H	Wayne Independent Rifles	Chester County	Charles Frederick Taylor; John D. Yerkes
I	The McKean Rifles	McKean County	William Blanchard; Frank J. Bell
K	The Raftsman's Rangers	Clearfield County	Edward A. Irvin; James M Welch

=== Service ===
The 13th Pennsylvania Reserves was mustered at Harrisburg, Pennsylvania on June 21, 1861. Thomas L. Kane was elected colonel, Charles John Biddle as lieutenant colonel, and Roy Stone as major. Kane, as a civilian, wanted to have Biddle, a Mexican War Veteran, be colonel instead, and a second election was held, granting Kane his wish. The unit served as part of the Pennsylvania Reserves for the majority of its service with the Union Army. The regiment was initially issued .69 caliber smoothbore muskets, but some of the men would not accept them, insisting that they were a rifle regiment. They eventually received .58 caliber rifles and used these weapons through August 1862. The 13th Reserves were first assigned to garrison duty in Maryland. On July 12 a scouting party under Kane of sixty men were surrounded by cavalry at New Creek Village, but fought them off, killing eight Confederates and wounding sixteen. After receiving reinforcements, Kane moved to Ridgeville which he captured after a skirmish.

In the fall, it was assigned to the V Corps of the Army of the Potomac, then serving in the Shenandoah Valley. On October 20, it marched to Dranesville, where Colonel Kane was wounded in the mouth while repulsing the Confederates. During a reorganization of the regiment in January 1862, Hugh W. McNeil was elected colonel and Kane lieutenant colonel, with Stone remaining major. Biddle had resigned to take his place in Congress. During the Peninsula Campaign, the Pennsylvania Reserves division was assigned as part of the I Corps; only part of the regiment went to the Peninsula, Companies C, G, H, and I, under the command of Kane, remaining in the Valley. This provisional battalion fought in several battles of the 1862 Valley Campaign.

During the Battle of Harrisonburg on June 6, in an attempt to rescue a Captain Haines and his wounded men of the 1st New Jersey Cavalry, the regiment held off Steuart's Brigade, including the 44th Virginia Infantry, the 58th Virginia Infantry, the 1st Maryland Infantry, CSA, and a Louisiana regiment, for an hour, killing General Turner Ashby. Colonel Kane was captured in the retreat. They had lost 52 men, and Confederates had lost over 500.

The other six companies went under Major Stone. During the retreat from Richmond, they lost one company in a swamp, then fought at Gaines Mill. Two other companies were lost during the retreat. At the retreat to Harrison's Landing, Stone and his men constructed a bridge over a stream, possibly saving the Union army. Stone took command of a different regiment after this. After the Peninsula Campaign, the regiment served in the Northern Virginia Campaign and participated in the defense of Henry House Hill during the closing hours of the Second Battle of Bull Run.

In early September, the two battalions were re-united under the command of McNeil, who had been sick; the Pennsylvania Reserve Division, now designated as the Third Division of the I Corps of the Army of the Potomac. The regiment was rearmed with Model 1859 Sharps breechloader rifles prior to setting off on the Maryland Campaign. At Bull Run, Kane was promoted to brigadier general for covering Pope's retreat. His position was filled by Edward Irvin. The new major was Alanson Niles. The regiment was decimated at Antietam, losing Colonel McNeil. The new commander was Charles Frederick Taylor, who had been captured twice by Confederates. They participated in the assault on Fredericksburg. Irwin resigned from injury, and Niles became lieutenant colonel. The Pennsylvania Reserves division was severely depleted from months of campaigning and in early 1863, they were sent back to Washington D.C. to rest and refit. The 13th Reserves thus did not participate in the Chancellorsville Campaign.

Prior to the Gettysburg Campaign, the 13th Pennsylvania returned to the Pennsylvania Reserves division was reassigned to the V Corps. Niles was wounded and Taylor was killed in fighting at the edge of The Wheatfield, leaving Major Hartshorn in command. They then marched to Spotsylvania for their final battle. The regiment was mustered out of service on June 11, 1864. Those who had reenlisted as veteran volunteers were transferred to the 190th Pennsylvania Infantry.

== Casualties ==
- Killed and mortally wounded:11 officers, 151 enlisted men
- Died of disease:2 officers, 88 enlisted men
- Total:13 officers, 239 enlisted men

== Commanders ==
- Lt. Col. Thomas Leiper Kane – 6/12–6/13/1861 (recruited unit; resigned commission as colonel in favor of the veteran Biddle; promoted to brigadier general)
- Col. Charles John Biddle – 6/14/1861–1/21/1862 (resigned to enter Congress)
- Col. Hugh McNeil – 1/22/1862–9/16/1862 (killed in action)
- Capt. Dennis Magee – 9/16/1862 (replaced)
- Col. Charles Frederick Taylor – 9/17/1862–7/2/1863 (killed in action)
