= Clara Steinitz =

German writer and translator

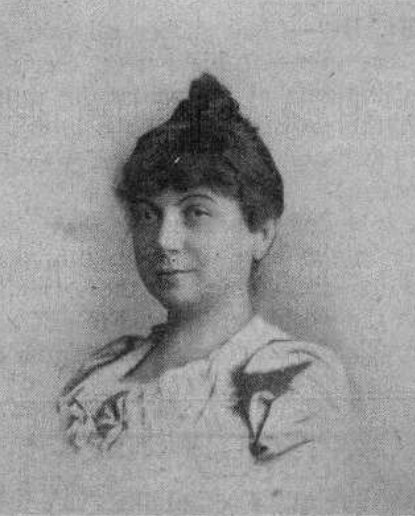
- Born: Clara Klausner; 16 April 1852; Kobylin, Prussia, German Confederation
- Died: 1931 (aged 78–79)
- Spouse: Heinrich Steinitz (m. 1873; died 1904)
- Writing career
- Pen name: Hans Burdach
- Language: German

Clara Steinitz (née Klausner; 16 April 1852 – 1931) was a German novelist, feuilletonist, and translator from English, French, Italian, and Norwegian.

She was born to Jewish parents Bernhard and Pauline Klausner in Kobylin, Prussia, and was educated at Halle-on-the-Saale. In 1873 she married Siegfried Heinrich Steinitz, editor of Die Deutsche Presse, with whom she moved to Berlin.

Among Steinitz's novels were Des Volkes Tochter (1878), Die Hässliche (1884), Ihr Beruf (1886), Im Priesterhause (1890), Ring der Nibelungen (1893), and Irrlicht (1895). She also translated several novels from foreign languages, including Bayard Taylor's Joseph and His Friend: A Story of Pennsylvania, Octave Feuillet's Les amours de Philippe, Hjalmar Hjorth Boyesen's Gunnar: A Tale of Norse Life and Under the Glacier, and Edward Bellamy's Miss Ludington's Sister: A Romance of Immortality.

== Publications ==
- Taylor, Bayard (1877). Joseph und Sein Freund [Joseph and His Friend]. Translated by Steinitz, Clara. Berlin.
- Steinitz, Clara (1878). Des Volkes Tochter. Erzählung. Leipzig.
- Feuillet, Octave (1878). Die Liebschaften Philipps von Boisvilliers [Les amours de Philippe]. Leipzig: Ernst Julius Günther.
- Steinitz, Clara (1884). Die Häßliche Roman. Berlin: Freund & Keckel.
- Boyesen, Hjalmar Hjorth (1885). Gunnar; Unter dem Gletscher. Zwei norwegische Erzählungen [Gunnar / Under the Glacier]. Leipzig: Reclam. hdl:2027/nnc1.1002138514.
- Steinitz, Clara (1886). Ihr Beruf. Erzählung. Berlin: Freund & Keckel.
- Döpler, Carl E.; Steinitz, Clara (1889). Der Ring des Nibelungen. Berlin: Berliner Kunstdruck- und Verlags-Anstalt.
- Steinitz, Clara (1890). Im Priesterhause. Original-Erzählung. Berlin: S. Gerstmann's Verlag.
  - Translated into English as Under the Rabbi's Roof. Cincinnati: Leo Wise & Co.
- Bellamy, Edward (1890). Fräulein Ludingtons Schwester. Ein Roman über die Unsterblichheit [Miss Ludington's Sister: A Romance of Immortality]. Berlin: Verlag von S. Fischer.
- Gissing, George (1892). Demos. Translated by Steinitz, Clara. Leipzig: Victor Ottmann.
- Steinitz, Clara (1895). Irrlicht. Roman. Berlin: Freund & Keckel.
- Morris, William (1900). Kunde von Nirgendwo: Ein Utopischer Roman [News from Nowhere]. Translated by Liebknecht, Natalie; Steinitz, Clara. Stuttgart: Dietz.
- Steinitz, Clara (1906). Thamar. Trauerspiel in vier Akten. Berlin.
- Steinitz, Clara (1909). Der Allerletzte. Dramatische Humoreske. Leipzig.
- Steinitz, Clara (1922). Uriel. Dramatisches Gedicht in vier Akten. Rendsburg & Leipzig: Euterpia-Verlag.
