= Senator Irvin =

Senator Irvin may refer to:

- Alexander Irvin (1800–1874), Pennsylvania State Senate
- Edward A. Irvin (1838–1908), Pennsylvania State Senate
- Missy Irvin (born 1971), Arkansas State Senate

== See also ==
- James Irvine (Pennsylvania politician) (1735–1819), Pennsylvania State Senate
- Senator Irwin (disambiguation)
