= Life of Turner Ashby =

1914 book by Thomas Ashby

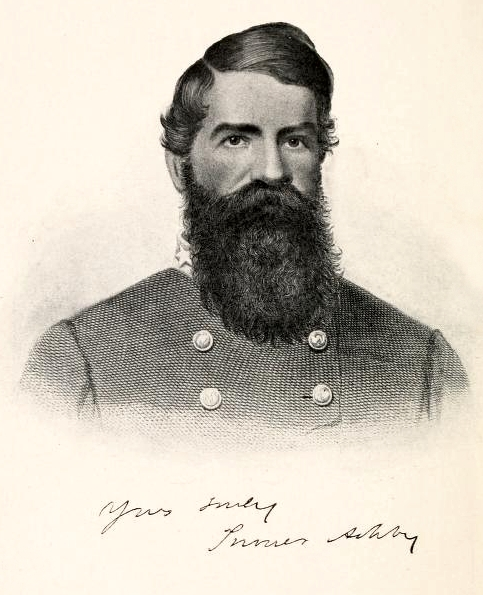
Illustration of Turner Ashby from the book's frontispiece

Life of Turner Ashby is a 1914 non-fiction book by Thomas Ashby about Confederate general Turner Ashby, who was killed in the Battle of Good's Farm.

== Overview ==
Thomas Ashby was a relative of Turner Ashby and wrote extremely positively of him in the book. The book took Ashby several years to research and write.

=== Publication history ===
Life of Turner Ashby was published in 1914 by the Neale Publishing Company. The initial publication was 275 pages long.

== Reception ==
Ashby's book was well-received in the popular press. The Chattanooga News published a positive review, while The Daily Arkansas Gazette praised Ashby's prose. The Des Moines Register described the biography as being "sympathetically and carefully written." A review published in The Baltimore Sun positively described Ashby's research and prose. Positive reviews were also published in The Boston Globe, The Journal and Tribune, and the Omaha World-Herald. Confederate organizations similarly praised the book, with Confederate Veteran publishing a positive review.
