= Steinitz =

Steinitz may refer to:

- Steinitz, Germany, a town in the district of Altmarkkreis Salzwedel in Saxony-Anhalt in Germany
- Steinitz (surname)
