= Charles Frederick Taylor =

Union Army colonel (1840–1863)

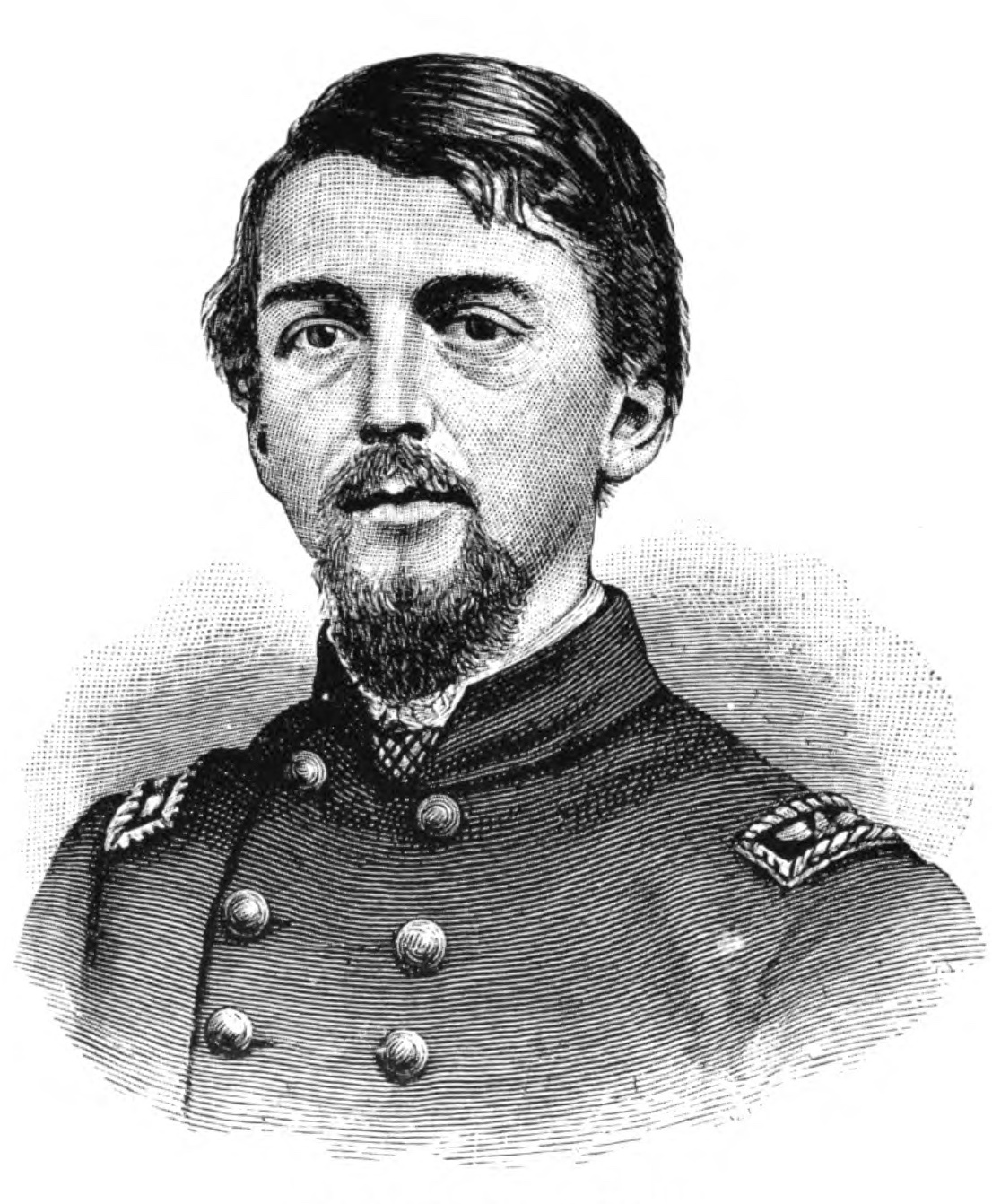
- Born: February 6, 1840; West Chester, Pennsylvania, U.S.
- Died: July 2, 1863 (aged 23); Gettysburg, Pennsylvania, U.S.
- Burial place: Longwood Cemetery, Kennett Square, Pennsylvania, U.S.
- Education: University of Michigan
- Relatives: Bayard Taylor (brother); Lillian Bayard Taylor Kiliani (niece)
- Military career
- Allegiance: United States (Union)
- Branch: U.S. Army (Union Army)
- Service years: 1861–1863
- Rank: Colonel
- Commands: 13th Pennsylvania Reserve Regiment (Bucktails)
- Conflicts: American Civil War; Battle of Good's Farm (POW); Battle of Fredericksburg (WIA); Battle of Gettysburg †

Charles Frederick Taylor (February 6, 1840 – July 2, 1863) was an American soldier who served as colonel and commanding officer of the Union Army's 13th Pennsylvania Reserve Regiment (known as the Bucktails), which formed part of the Army of the Potomac during the American Civil War. He was killed in action at the Battle of Gettysburg while leading a pursuit of retreating Confederates at the edge of The Wheatfield. He was the brother of author Bayard Taylor.

== Early life and family ==
Taylor was born in West Chester, Pennsylvania, on February 6, 1840, to Joseph and Rebecca (Way) Taylor. His family was of English Quaker and German descent, and at the time of his death, his father was completing a three-year term as sheriff of Chester County, of which West Chester was the county seat. Shortly after his birth, the Taylors returned to their family farm called Hazeldell near Kennett Square, Pennsylvania, where Taylor grew up and attended school.

"Fred" Taylor was the youngest of six children who survived into adulthood. His three brothers included the celebrated poet and traveler Bayard Taylor, Union Army Colonel William W. Taylor, and Union Army surgeon John Howard Taylor. His sisters included Annie Taylor Carey, who stepped in to manage the family farm, and Emma Taylor Lamborn.

== Education and farming ==
In the fall of 1855, Taylor entered the University of Michigan. He took a sabbatical to accompany his brother Bayard and his sisters on a grand tour of England, France, Germany, Switzerland, and Italy between July 1856 and June 1857. He learned German and French and resumed his studies in the fall of 1857 but withdrew from Michigan at the end of the spring of 1858 to manage Hazeldell, seeking to make the farm self-sustaining through innovative agricultural methods. With financial aid from Bayard, he was making progress as a farmer when the Civil War erupted in 1861.

== American Civil War ==
In response to Abraham Lincoln's call for three-month volunteers to suppress Southern secessionists, Taylor organized a company of Kennett volunteers on April 20, 1861. Marching to Camp Curtin near Harrisburg, they formed Company H in the 42nd Pennsylvania Volunteer Infantry (or the 13th Pennsylvania Reserve Regiment). The 21-year-old Taylor was unanimously elected captain.

The regiment saw little action in the early months of the war. Four companies, including Taylor's, were detailed to fight in the Shenandoah Valley campaign of 1862, attached to George Dashiell Bayard's flying brigade. On June 6, 1862, Taylor fought in his first battle at Good's Farm near Harrisonburg, Virginia, where he was captured while leading a rearguard action. His regiment's lieutenant colonel, Thomas L. Kane, was wounded and also captured. Both officers were soon paroled, and Taylor spent the next four months in Annapolis, Maryland, waiting to be formally exchanged before he could rejoin his regiment. During this period, Lieutenant Colonel Kane received a promotion to brigadier general, and Colonel Hugh W. McNeil was killed at the Battle of Antietam (the previous colonel, Charles John Biddle, had resigned in December 1861 to enter Congress). Taylor returned to his regiment as acting commander in time to fight in the Battle of Fredericksburg in December 1862, where 190 out of 300 soldiers of the 13th who fought in the battle became casualties in frontal attacks on entrenched Confederate positions. Taylor was wounded in the shoulder, and his horse was shot out from under him. Posted to defend Washington while his regiment recovered from its losses, Taylor received his anticipated promotion to full colonel on March 1, 1863.

Taylor's next and final battle was the Battle of Gettysburg. The 13th deployed to defend Little Round Top on July 2, 1863. Late in the afternoon that day, Taylor, on foot, led a charge down the hill across Plum Run, drove back the Confederates from a stone wall and through the Rose Woods to the edge of The Wheatfield, with the Bucktails in hot pursuit. Taylor with twenty other soldiers got ahead of the main Union advance and halted, only to be struck suddenly by gunfire from Confederate reinforcements. A bullet pierced Taylor's heart, and he died on the spot two minutes later. His regiment suffered a total of seven men killed, 39 wounded, and two missing at Gettysburg.

Taylor died at the age of 23. His remains were returned to Kennett Square and interred at Longwood Cemetery on July 8, 1863. At Annapolis he had become engaged to Alice Green, whose father was a slaveholder. Green attended his funeral, but Taylor's family disapproved of the engagement and destroyed their letters after his death.

== Legacy ==
Taylor was the youngest colonel in the Army of the Potomac at the time of his death. His commanding officer, Brigadier General Samuel W. Crawford, praised him as "the gallant and brave leader of the Bucktail Regiment" who "fell while leading his regiment to the charge. No braver soldier and patriot has given his life for his cause."

On October 6, 1905, the Regimental Association of the Bucktails dedicated a granite marker on the exact spot where Taylor fell.
