= Taylor Memorial =

Taylor Memorial may refer to the following:

== Buildings and structures ==
- Bayard Taylor Memorial Library in Kennett Square, Pennsylvania
- M. Harvey Taylor Memorial Bridge in Harrisburg, Pennsylvania
- Taylor Memorial Arboretum in Wallingford, Pennsylvania
- Taylor Memorial Bridge in Hudson, Massachusetts
- Taylor Memorial Chapel in Black Forest, Colorado
- Taylor Memorial Institute in Toowoomba, Queensland, Australia
- Taylor Memorial Library in Milford, Connecticut

== Events ==
- Noel J Taylor Memorial Mile, a Group I horse race in New Zealand
