= Ezra Michener =

American naturalist, medical doctor and Quaker

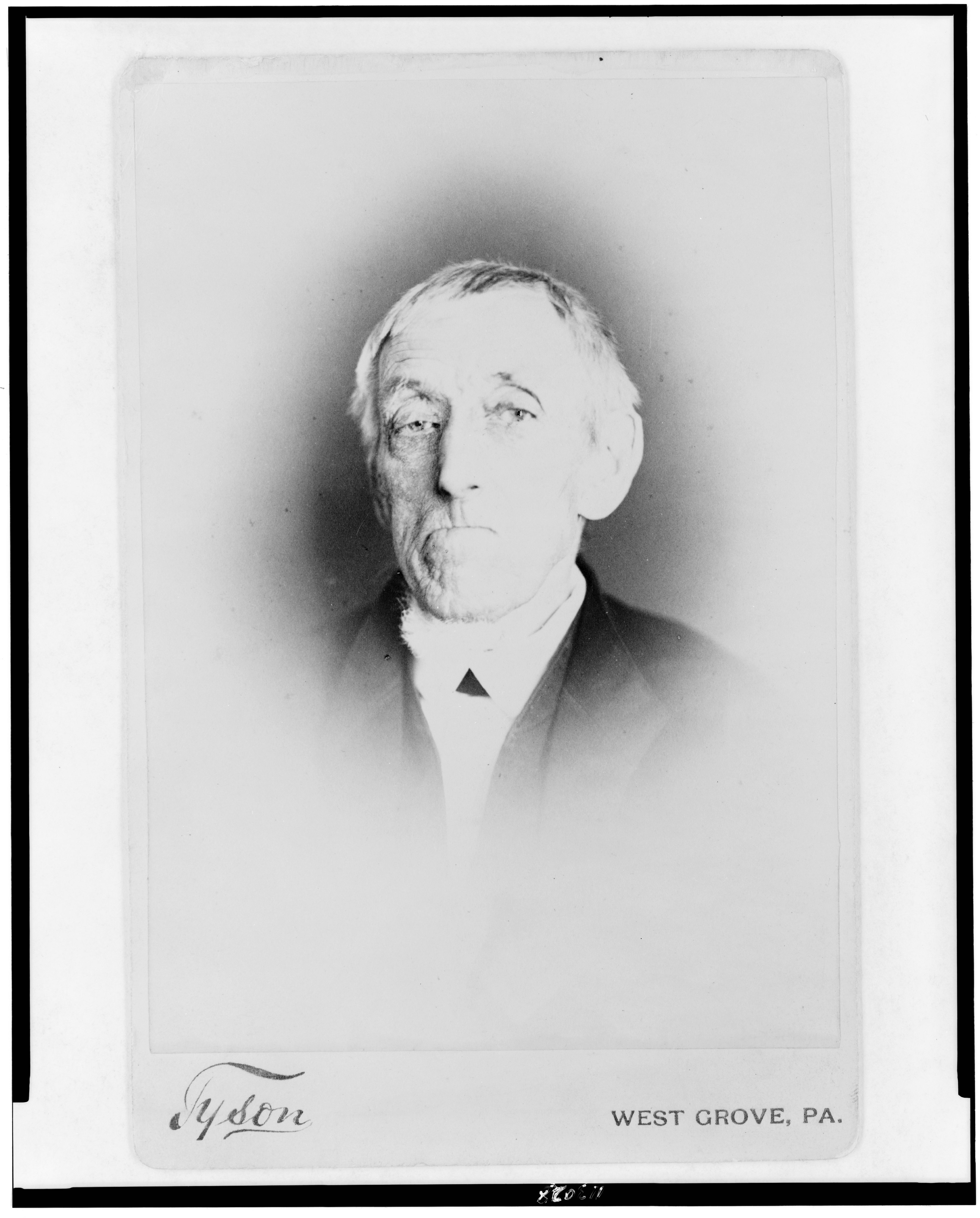
- Ezra Michener, 1887
- Born: 1794; London Grove Township, Chester County, Philadelphia, USA
- Died: 1887 (aged 92–93); Toughkenamon, Pennsylvania
- Known for: botanist and medical doctor
- Children: 3
- Scientific career
- Workplaces: Chester County, Pennsylvania
- Author abbrev. (botany): E.Michener

Ezra Michener (1794 - 1887) was an American botanist and medical doctor who lived in Chester County, Pennsylvania, USA for most of his life. In addition to writing a book, he made extensive collections of plants and fungi that are now in national collections.

== Early life, education and personal life ==
Michener was the fifth child of Mordecai and Alice (née Dunn) Michener. He was born on the family farm. He was not educated at a school but was taught by some local people and also self-taught.

He became interested in plants and spent time at Harmony Grove, a botanic garden begun in the mid-1770s by the self-taught botanist John Jackson (1748–1821), developed further by later generations of his family and which survived into the early twentieth century as the area developed into a horticultural company. It was well known at the time and also housed the Farmers Library. Johnson was part of friendship circle of early botanists in Pennsylvania who characterised and identified plants, preserved dried specimens and exchanged seeds and live plants. Michener was taught by Jackson from 1810 onwards and would have met these other botanists including William Darlington. He also had access to books in the library such as the 92 volume Rees's Cyclopædia, books by Charles Darwin and about the voyages of James Cook.

In autumn 1815, he moved to Philadelphia, staying with cousins, and was appointed as the house student of the Philadelphia Dispensary in summer 1816. His role was to assist the apothecary and physicians. This provided him with the practical training needed for a career in medicine. He also attended lectures in several subjects, including on botany from William P. C. Barton in spring 1816. He passed his final medical examination in April 1818 and was awarded a diploma. He then returned home to Chester County. He was elected an honorary member of the Medical Society of Pennsylvania.

Michener was married twice, first on 15 April 1819 to Sarah Spencer, and then after her death in 1843, he married Mary S. Walton in 1844. He had at least four sons and 3 daughters with several dying in childhood. He was a life-long and active member of the Society of Friends.

== Career ==
He was a country doctor but also a naturalist, especially interested in plants, fungi and lichens, but he also collected and observed shells, birds, mammals, birds and reptiles. His contacts with the scientific community of Philadelphia and Pennsylvania meant that he became involved in their activities. From around 1818, William Darlington led the production of the Chester County Cabinet that aimed to collect specimens of the natural products of the county and materials for prospective natural history. Michener became involved in the collections and contributed to the publications that came from them.

Michener collected many specimens. He was in contact with many contemporary botanists and mycologists for assistance in identifying them. Most of this very extensive correspondence has not survived. He exchanged information and specimens with Edward Tuckerman, Moses Ashley Curtis and William Henry Ravenel, among others. He was also in contact with William Darlington and contributed lichens and prepared them for Darlington's book Flora cestrica: an attempt to enumerate and describe the flowering and filicoid plants of Chester County in the state of Pennsylvania (1837). Michener was also instrumental in ensuring that the collection of fungal specimens made by Lewis David de Schweinitz was catalogued and displayed, noting that some specimens had been lost or destroyed by insects. He worked on this between 1855 and 1857, devising a system for mounting and labelling the specimens in communication with the botanical committee of the Academy of Natural Sciences, Philadelphia. This resulted in a collection of 201 specimens being returned to the academy. He presented a collection of 426 preserved mammals, birds and reptiles to Swarthmore College, the majority of which he had prepared himself, to the academy in 1869, but they were subsequently destroyed in a fire. His collections of plants, fungi, lichens and shells were given by his son to Bayard Taylor Memorial Library. The fungi and lichens were subsequently sold to the US government Bureau of Plant Industry to become part of its reference collection.

== Publications ==
- Michener's notes and some letters were put together into an autobiography Autographical Notes from the Life and Letters of Ezra Michener, M. D.
- Michener contributed to William Darlington's book Flora cestrica: an attempt to enumerate and describe the flowering and filicoid plants of Chester County in the state of Pennsylvania (1837).
- William D. Hartman and Ezra Michener (1874) Conchologia Cestrica, Philadelphia
- Ezra Michener (1872) Manual of Weeds, or The Weed Exterminator: being a description, botanical and familiar, of a century of weeds injurious to the Farmer, with practical suggestions for their extermination King and Baird, Philadelphia. 150 pp
- Michener published some observations about blood-letting from his medical experience (Medical and Surgical Reporter 1869, 5–6; Country Practitioner 1881 11–19) and about the use of ergot to aid delivery at the end of pregnancy (Medical and Surgical Reporter 1870 page 145).

The standard author abbreviation E.Michener is used to indicate this person as the author when citing a botanical name.

== Honours and awards ==
Michener was elected a member of the Academy of Natural Sciences, Philadelphia in 1840. The lichen species Biatora micheneri was named after him by Tuckernam.
