= Cedarcroft =

Historic house in Pennsylvania, United States

- U.S. National Register of Historic Places
- U.S. National Historic Landmark
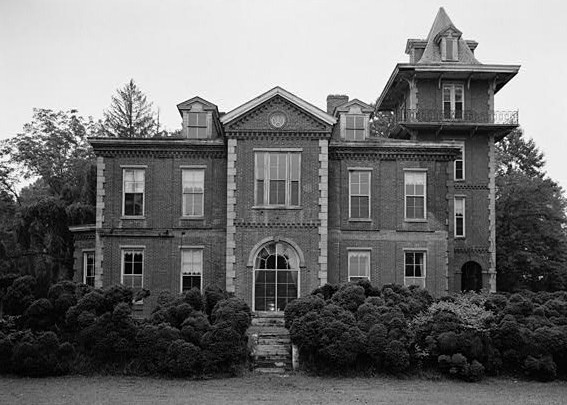
- Cedarcroft in 1960

- Location within Pennsylvania Location within the United States
- Nearest city: Kennett Square, Pennsylvania
- Coordinates: 39°51′34.98″N 75°43′9.03″W
- Built: 1859
- Architect: Bayard Taylor
- NRHP reference No.: 71000693

Significant dates
- Added to NRHP: November 11, 1971
- Designated NHL: November 11, 1971

Cedarcroft, also known as Bayard Taylor House, is a historic house on Gatehouse Drive in Chester County, Pennsylvania near Kennett Square. It was built in 1859 for writer Bayard Taylor (1825–1878), and is a good local example of Italianate architecture. It remained Taylor's home until 1874, and is where he wrote some of his well-known works. It has been a private residence for most of its existence, spending a few years in the early 20th century as a private boys' school. It was designated a National Historic Landmark in 1971 for its association with Taylor.

== History ==
Taylor built the mansion he named Cedarcroft near Kennett Square, Pennsylvania in 1859–1860. He personally supervised its construction, including its two-foot walls and tall tower, and later wrote a series of articles about it. He also owned the surrounding 200 acres of land which he had spent several years acquiring. He described the building's design as "large and stately, simple in its forms, without much ornament... expressive of strength and ornament." He lived here with his wife Marie Hansen, the daughter of the Danish/German astronomer Peter Andreas Hansen, whom he married in 1857. Several of Taylor's writings were either written at Cedarcroft or reference it, including his 1863 book The Poet's Journal, which he dedicated to his wife as "the Mistress of Cedarcroft".

Taylor pushed to complete the new home shortly after the birth of his daughter Lilian in 1858 and increased his writings for periodicals and offered several lectures to acquire the necessary revenue. Taylor laid the cornerstone for the house's tower on June 9, 1859, with a hidden time capsule. That zinc box, he wrote, contains coins, a newspaper, a copy of his book Views Afoot, as well as "an original poem by me, to be read five hundred years hence by somebody who has never heard of me."

Upon moving into the home in 1860, Taylor's family performed a farcical play co-written with Richard Henry Stoddard. In addition to Stoddard, Cedarcroft hosted several other literary figures, including George Henry Boker, Edmund Clarence Stedman, James Russell Lowell, James T. Fields, and Ralph Waldo Emerson. Outside the house, Taylor planted a number of fruits and vegetables, including Latakia tobacco and melons. Plants included a giant sequoia from California, ivy, Dutchman's pipe, Virginia creeper, wisteria, and trumpet flower. After visiting the house, Sidney Lanier wrote a poem called "Under the Cedarcroft Chestnut" about a tree there that was alleged to be 800 years old. The first work which Taylor himself wrote while living in Cedarcroft was his semi-autobiographical poetic series The Poet's Journal, written within a month after moving in, though not published until 1862.

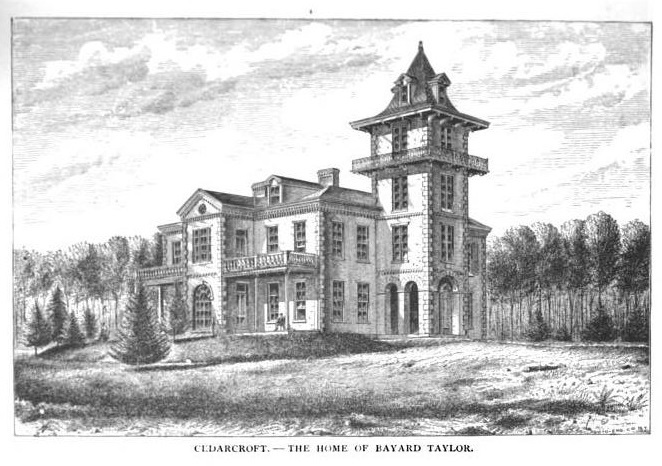
Illustration of Cedarcroft in 1877

The construction of the home cost $15,000 by February 1860, which was $5,000 more than anticipated and left Taylor in debt. His life in Kennett Square was further complicated by the outbreak of the American Civil War in 1861. As he wrote to Stoddard in April, "Everything here is upside down. We live almost in a state of siege, with the rumors of war flying about us. At present we don't know what is going on. We have reckless secessionists within twelve miles of us." Out of precaution, Taylor acquired weapons and buried his manuscripts before leaving the country and visiting Europe.

Because of financial and political issues, Taylor only spent four out of the first eight summers at Cedarcroft. Instead, he traveled, gave lectures, and continued his literary work in New York. In the spring of 1862, he was chief war correspondent for the New York Tribune and visited the army at the lines in Virginia and reported on Congress in Washington, D.C. Later that year, he took a diplomatic job as chargé d'affaires at Saint Petersburg in Russia. The job was short-lived, however, and his financial problems continued. Further, Taylor had some difficulty with his neighbors, mostly conservative Quakers, who disapproved of his use of alcohol and cigars as well as his late-night gatherings.

By 1870, Taylor complained to his mother, "If I had known, in 1859, how prices were to change, and labor to be dear and unreliable, and the neighborhood to go backwards instead of forwards, I never should have built [Cedarcroft] at all." Further, he admitted he wanted to live in New York and considered his experiment at a country life combined with literature was "a dead failure, and I have been carrying it on now for several years... out of stubborn unwillingness to admit that I was mistaken." By 1875, he left the home to the care of his parents, sister and brother-in-law.

== After Taylor ==
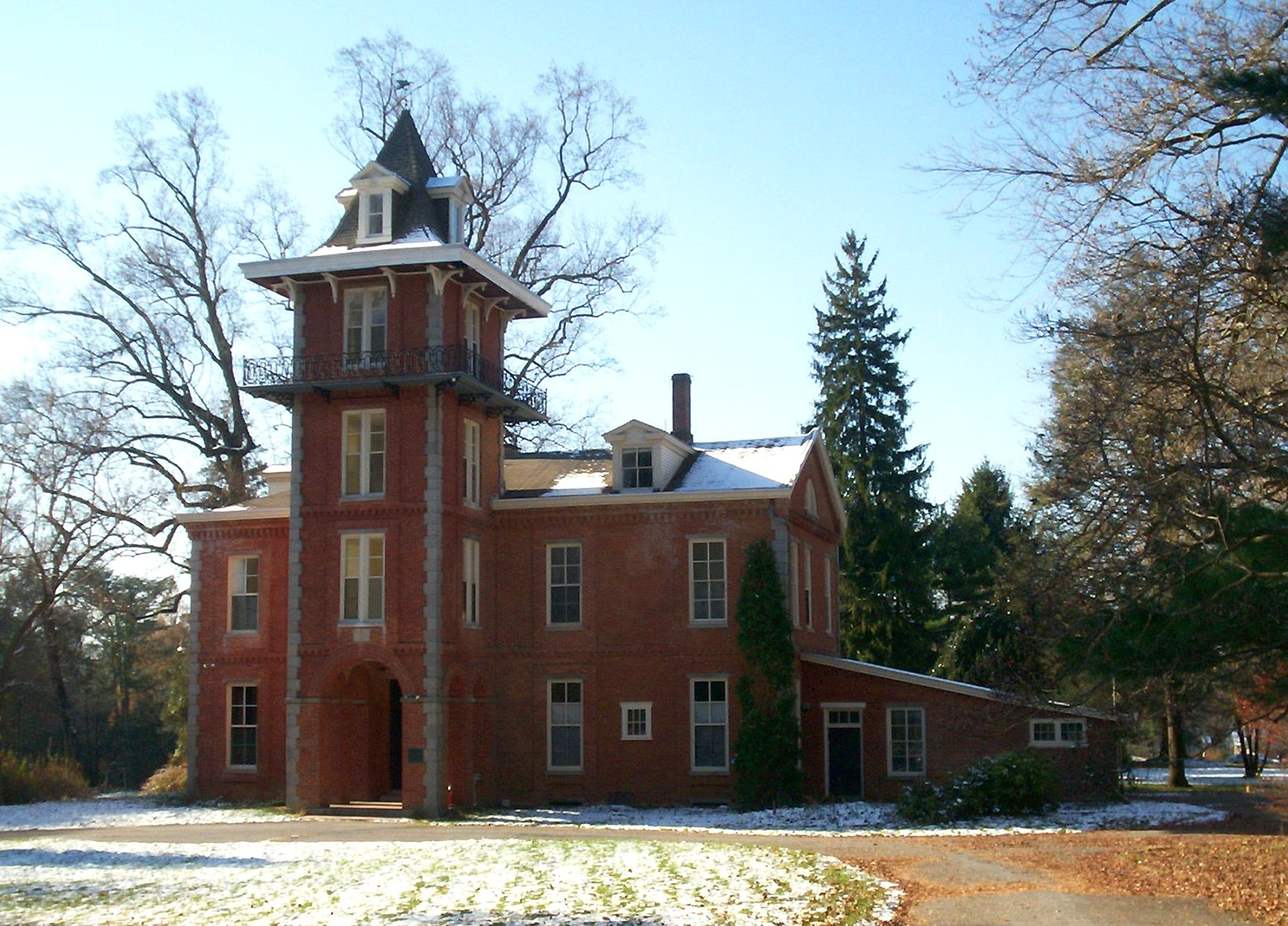
Side view of Cedarcroft in 2008

Taylor died in Germany on December 19, 1878. The home remained in the Taylor family until 1882, when his widow Marie and daughter Lilian sold the house and the 116 acres that remained from the original estate to Isaac Warner Jr. for $14,050.

In September 1905, the home, along with a new 3-story building behind it, was opened as a private preparatory school for boys. The first class included seven boys under the leadership of Principal Jesse Evans Philips, though later years saw between 32 and 40 enrolled for each class. Among the school's students was future professional baseball player Herb Pennock. At 18 years old, Pennock was signed to the Philadelphia Athletics in 1912; he was later traded to the Boston Red Sox and then the New York Yankees. Pennock, nicknamed "The Squire of Kennett Square", was posthumously inducted into the baseball hall of fame in 1948.

The Cedarcroft School lasted until 1917 when it was absorbed by St. Luke's Academy on the Main Line outside of Philadelphia. In the same year, the house and estate was purchased by James Bachelor Dowsland Edge (1875-1939). Born in England, he came to America where he rose to become Vice-President of E. I. du Pont de Nemours & Co. James Edge had the funds and vision necessary for him and his wife, Anna Baily (1877-1964), to restore the house, carriage house, barn, swimming pool and gardens to their former glory. Aside from their three children, James' only brother, Francis Edge, also lived here, making his home in the fourth and fifth floors of the tower from which back then it was said the Delaware River could be seen.

In 1971 the Bergo family purchased Cedarcroft and began a multi-year restoration of the house, inside and out, over a 15 year period, while living in and enjoying this unique house. The house was declared a National Historic Landmark and placed on the National Register in 1972. Today, Cedarcroft stands surrounded by suburban subdivision neighborhood of mostly single-story tract housing built in the 1950s and 1960s, at the junction of Gatehouse Drive and Potter Drive.

== See also ==
- List of National Historic Landmarks in Pennsylvania
- National Register of Historic Places listings in Chester County, Pennsylvania
