= Steinitz (surname) =

Steinitz is a German surname. Notable people with the surname include:

- Clara Steinitz (1852–1931), German writer
- Wilhelm Steinitz (1836–1900), Czech-Austrian chess player and first official world champion
- Ernst Steinitz (1871–1928), German mathematician
- Wolfgang Steinitz (1905–1967), German linguist and ethnologist
- Paul Steinitz (1909–1988), English conductor and Bach scholar
- Yuval Steinitz (born 1958), Israeli politician
