= Thomas Ashby (doctor) =

American politician (1848–1916)

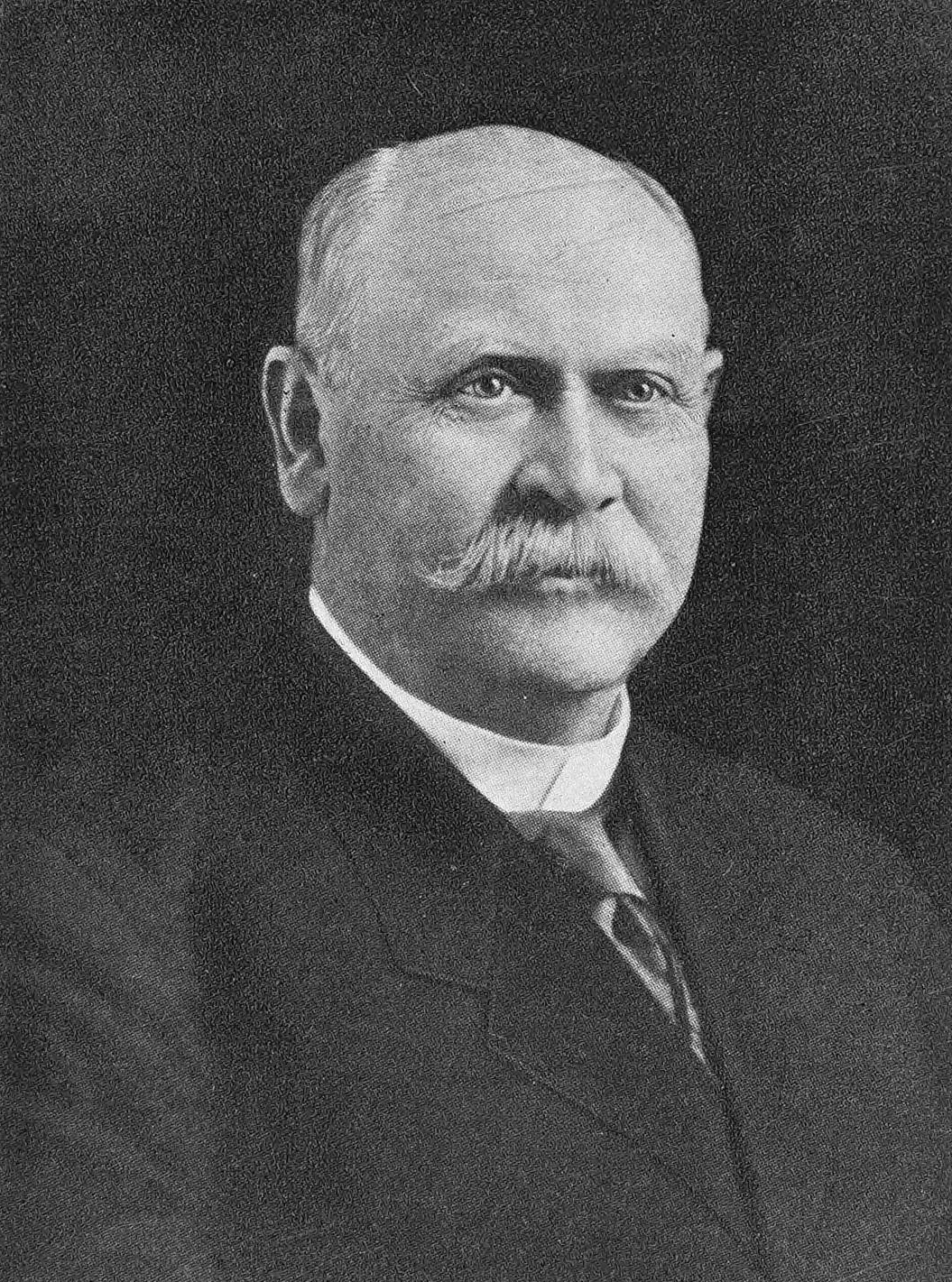

Maryland House of Delegates
- In office 1909

Personal details
- Born: Thomas Almond Ashby; November 18, 1848 Warren County, Virginia
- Died: June 26, 1916 (aged 67) Baltimore, Maryland
- Party: Democratic
- Spouse: Mary Cunningham (m. 1877)
- Children: 5
- Education: Washington and Lee University; University of Maryland
- Occupation: Physician, writer, politician

Thomas Almond Ashby (November 18, 1848 – June 26, 1916) was an American surgeon, writer, and politician, a member of the Maryland House of Delegates. At his death, he was the only faculty member of the University of Maryland to have served in the state legislature.

== Biography ==
Born in Warren County, Virginia, Ashby attended Washington and Lee University studying the classics, modern languages and chemistry, and studied medicine at the University of Maryland, from which he graduated with an M.D. in 1873. He practiced as a gynecologist. In 1877, he was one of the founders of the Maryland Medical Journal. He held various positions at the University of Maryland Medical Department, before leaving in 1878. Under Ashby's leadership, the Women's Medical College was established in Baltimore in 1882. He served as Chair of Obstetrics from 1882 to 1897, and as Chair of Diseases of Women and Children from 1889 to 1897, at Baltimore Medical College. In 1897, he became Professor of Diseases of Women at the Medical Department of the University of Maryland.

He was active in professional medical associations. He was a Fellow of the American Medical Association, the American College of Surgeons, and the American Gynecological Society. He was president of the Medical and Chirurgical Faculty of Maryland.

In 1909, Ashby was elected to the Maryland House of Delegates. His legislative career was highlighted by a focus on health issues. He was chairman of the Hygienic Committee, and introduced bills in the health field, including those concerning pure food, the care of the mentally ill, and increasing the powers of the State Board of Health. He later received an LL.D. from Washington and Lee in 1912.

Ashby wrote several books on the United States Civil War. Ashby wrote a biography of his relative, Turner Ashby, a Confederate general killed in action in 1862 in the Civil War entitled Life of Turner Ashby, and a book on the Civil War actions in the Shenandoah Valley, entitled The Valley Campaigns Being the Reminiscences of a Non-Combatant While Between the Lines in the Shenandoah Valley During the War of the States (1914).

Ashby died in Baltimore, Maryland in 1916. He was buried at Prospect Hill Cemetery in Front Royal, Virginia.

== Personal life ==
Ashby married Mary Cunningham, from Kentucky, in 1877, and had five daughters with her.
