= Lillian Bayard Taylor Kiliani =

German-American poet, translator, and anti-suffragist

- Born: Lillian Bayard Taylor; August 3, 1858; Gotha, Germany
- Died: October 10, 1940 (aged 82); Bavaria, Germany
- Other names: Lilian Bayard Taylor, Mrs. Otto G. T. Kiliani
- Education: Anna C. Brackett's School Vassar College Art Students League of New York
- Occupations: Poet, translator, anti-suffragist
- Years active: 1880s–1930s
- Known for: Anti-suffragist activism, German-American cultural exchange
- Notable work: On Two Continents: Memories of Half A Century (1905) A Sheaf of Poems (1911) "Women's Rights and Women's Work" (1912)
- Spouse: Otto George Theobald Kiliani (m. 1887)
- Children: 2, including Richard Bayard Taylor Kiliani
- Parent: Bayard Taylor (father) Marie Hansen-Taylor (mother)
- Relatives: Peter Andreas Hansen (maternal grandfather) Charles Frederick Taylor (paternal uncle)

Lillian Bayard Taylor Kiliani (August 3, 1858 – October 10, 1940), also seen as Lilian Bayard Taylor, was a German-American poet, translator, and anti-suffragist.

== Early life and education ==
Kiliani was born in Gotha, Germany, the daughter of Bayard Taylor and Marie Hansen-Taylor. Her father was an American writer and diplomat; her mother was born in Germany, the daughter of astronomer Peter Andreas Hansen. Kiliani attended Anna C. Brackett's School in New York City, and Vassar College, as well as several schools in Germany. She also studied art with the Art Students League of New York, and in Berlin.

== Career ==
Kiliani wrote and translated poetry and other texts, including a German translation of Hamlet for Edwin Booth in the 1880s. She was active in several German women's organizations, including as president of the German Governesses' Home Association. She was international secretary of the New York State Association Opposed to Woman's Suffrage, and an honorary member of the organization's British equivalent. She visited England in 1909, and reported to American newspapers that there was "no hope in England for woman suffrage."

Writing from Germany, March 14, 1915, she states:

The women are doing a noble, womanly work in a womanly way, and perhaps the war may serve to show many of them how much more important it is than to try to do the man's work. In times like this, the men on the battlefield and the women at home are proving best how each should do his and her appointed part of the world's work.

== Publications ==
- On Two Continents: Memories of Half A Century (1905, with Marie Hansen Taylor)
- A Sheaf of Poems (1911, her father's translations of German poetry, interspersed with her own translations of the same poems)
- "Women's Rights and Women's Work" (1912)

== Personal life and legacy ==
Kiliani married German surgeon and medical school professor Otto George Theobald Kiliani in 1887. They had a son, Richard, born in 1888, and a daughter, Gladys, who died in childhood. During World War I, her husband served as a surgeon in the German army's medical corps, and their son Richard served in an American regiment. Her mother, who moved back to Germany in 1915 and lived with the Kilianis in Bavaria, died in 1925; her husband died in 1928, and her son died in 1934. She died in 1940, at the age of 83, in Germany. Some of her letters and journals are in the Marie Hansen Taylor papers at Stanford University. In 1925, she donated some of her father's papers to Yale University.
