= Battle of Good's Farm =

1862 Battle of the American Civil War

Coordinates: 38°25.398′N 78°51.873′W

Battle of Good's Farm / Battle of Harrisonburg
- Part of Jackson's Valley Campaign, American Civil War
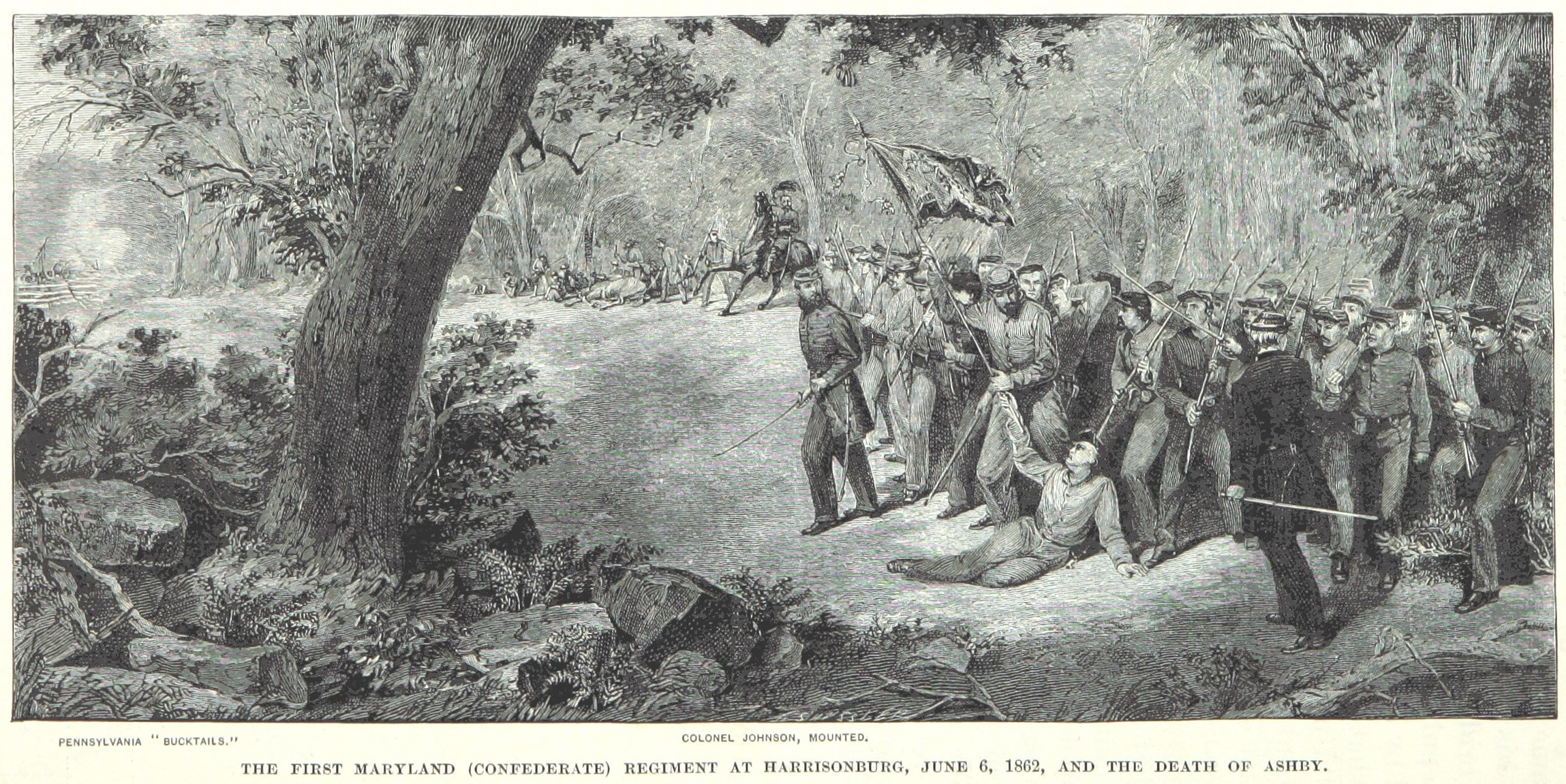
- The death of Ashby during the battle
Date	June 6, 1862
Location	Near Harrisonburg, Virginia
Result	Confederate victory

Belligerents
United States	(Confederate States of America) Confederacy

Commanders and leaders
Percy Wyndham (WIA) (POW); Thomas L. Kane (WIA) (POW)	Turner Ashby †

Strength
1st New Jersey Cavalry; 13th Pennsylvania Reserves	Ashby’s Laurel Brigade; 58th Virginia Infantry; 1st Maryland Infantry

Casualties and losses
154	70

The Battle of Good's Farm (a.k.a. Battle of Harrisonburg) was a short skirmish between the Confederates and the Union in Jackson's Valley Campaign in the American Civil War. During the fighting, Confederate cavalry officer Turner Ashby was killed.

== Wyndham’s Attack ==
On June 6, 1862, a company of the 1st New Jersey Cavalry Regiment attacked Confederate scouts stationed in Harrisonburg. Chasing the enemy to Good’s Farm on the outskirts of town, the company was fired upon by infantry of the 58th Virginia concealed behind two stone walls on either side of the road. The cavalry notified their commander Colonel Percy Wyndham, who marched with his soldiers towards the scene of the ambush. They then charged some woods atop a hill where the 7th Virginia Cavalry under Colonel Turner Ashby had blocked the road.

As soon as the 1st New Jersey began their charge the Confederate infantry again fired on them, this time from behind a fence concealed by woods. In an attempt to remove the Infantry, Colonel Wyndham dismounted and led a charge into the enemy line. However, finding the enemy too well concealed and being flanked by Ashby’s Cavalry, the 1st New Jersey started a hasty and disorganized retreat. In the end they had left behind Colonel Wyndham, 3 Captains, the regimental colours, and about a twelfth of their men.

== Kane’s Attack ==
Meanwhile, Colonel Thomas L. Kane of the 13th Pennsylvania Reserves or “Bucktails”, received permission to rescue the wounded from the field from Brigadier General George D. Bayard. Soon after, Bayard, the 1st Pennsylvania Cavalry, and the 13th Pennsylvania Reserves moved forward to Ashby’s position.

From his position, General Bayard saw reinforcements from the 1st Maryland Infantry (Confederate) arrive. He promptly ordered the cavalry to fall back and sent a messenger to Colonel Kane, who had already entered the woods with his men.

The Bucktails hid behind trees at the edge of the woods and began firing into the Confederates, causing a number of casualties and checking their advance. Seeing his men falter, Ashby moved towards the front of the line on foot, his horse having been shot out from under him. He was attempting to rally his men when a combatant shot him directly through the heart, killing him instantly.

The origin of the fatal shot has been lost to history. Soldiers of the 13th Pennsylvania Reserves claimed credit, though some accounts blame friendly fire. Ashby's last words were "Forward my brave men!" He had been nominated for promotion to brigadier general just ten days before his death.

The 58th Virginia and the 1st Maryland Infantry Regiment (Confederate) counterattacked. Flanked and outnumbered, the 13th Pennsylvania Reserves retreated. Colonel Thomas L. Kane, wounded in the leg, and Captain Charles Frederick Taylor were both captured by the enemy.

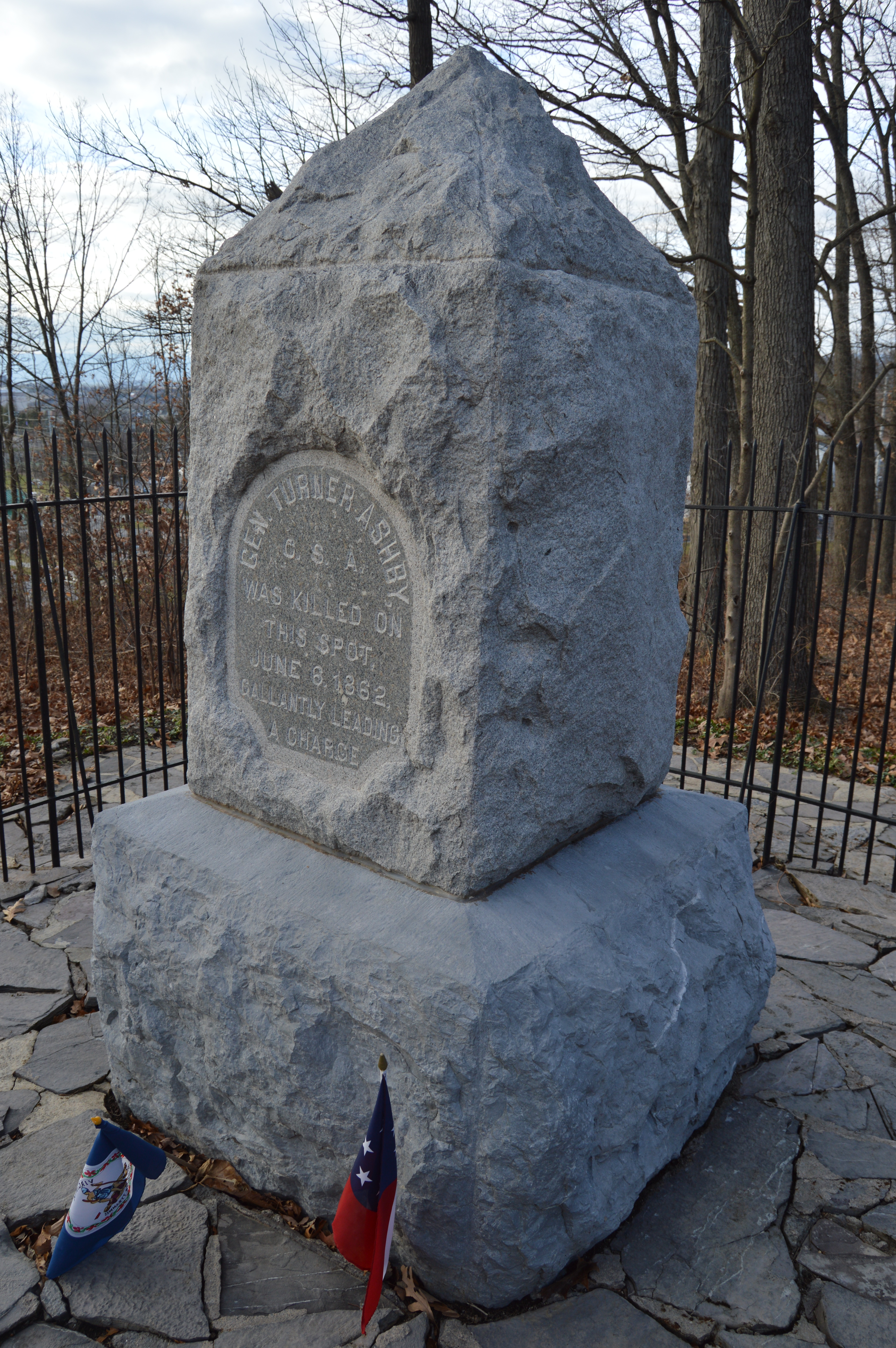
Monument at the site of Ashby's death
