= Irvona, Pennsylvania =

Borough in Pennsylvania, US

- Borough
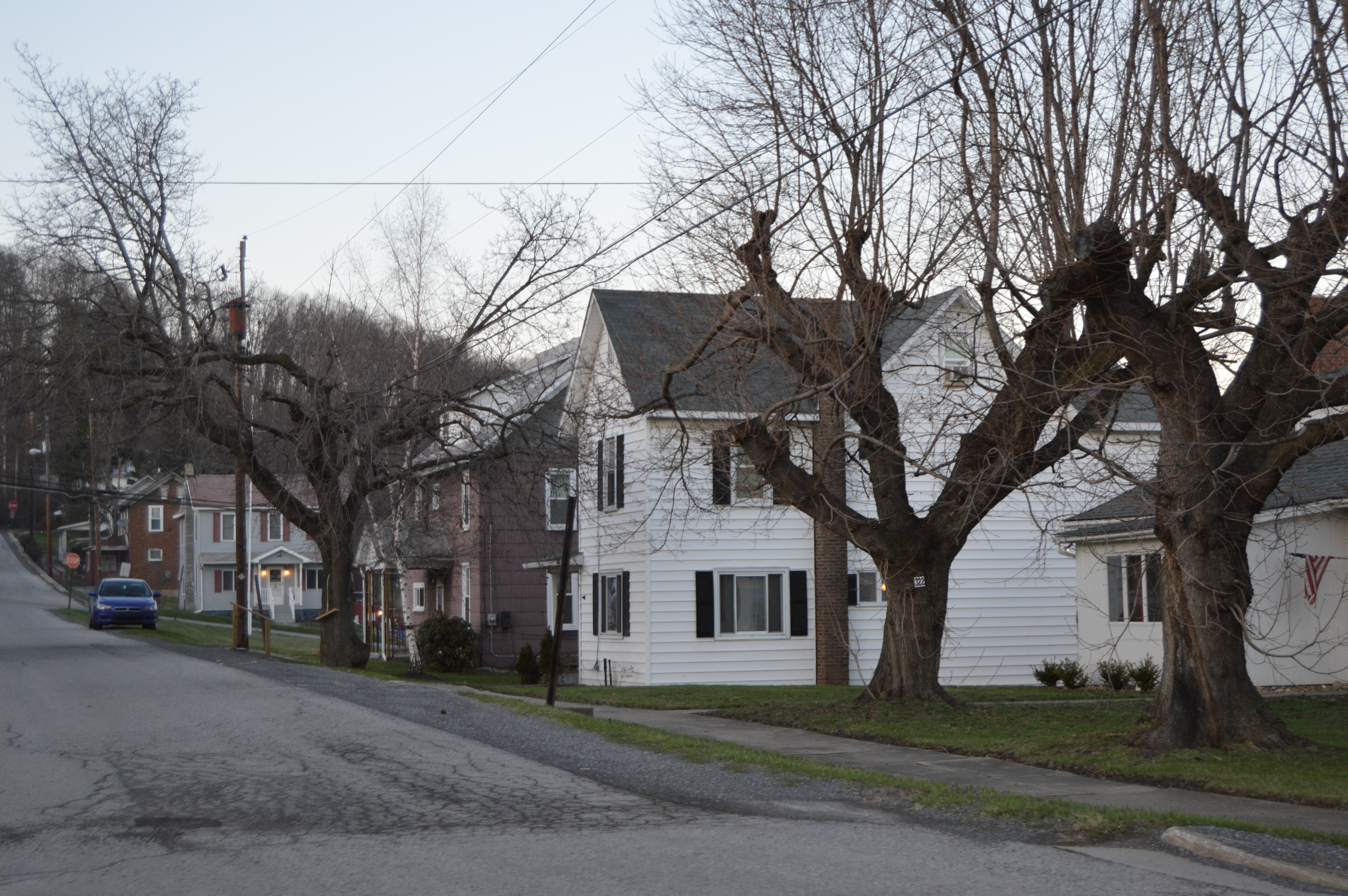
- Houses on Hopkins Street

- Location of Irvona in Clearfield County, Pennsylvania.

- Location of Clearfield County in Pennsylvania

- Location in Pennsylvania
- Coordinates: 40°46′25″N 78°33′09″W
- Country: United States
- State: Pennsylvania
- County: Clearfield
- Incorporated: 1890

Government
  - Type: Borough Council

Area
  - Total: 0.95 sq mi (2.46 km^{2})
  - Land: 0.93 sq mi (2.41 km^{2})
  - Water: 0.019 sq mi (0.05 km^{2})
- Elevation: 1,379 ft (420 m)

Population (2020)
  - Total: 549
  - Density: 590.7/sq mi (228.08/km^{2})
- Time zone: UTC-5 (Eastern (EST))
  - Summer (DST): UTC-4 (EDT)
- ZIP code: 16656
- Area code: 814
- FIPS code: 42-37192
- Website: irvonaborough.com

Irvona is a borough in Clearfield County, Pennsylvania, United States. The population was 549 at the 2020 census.

== History ==
The borough of Irvona was named in honor of Edward A. Irvin, a Union Army lieutenant colonel and member of the Pennsylvania Senate. The town was incorporated on September 2, 1890.

== Geography ==
Irvona is located in southern Clearfield County at 40°46′25″N 78°33′9″W (40.773516, -78.552552), along Clearfield Creek, a tributary of the West Branch Susquehanna River. Pennsylvania Route 53 passes through the borough, leading south 2 miles (3 km) to Coalport and northeast 4 miles (6 km) to Glen Hope.

According to the United States Census Bureau, Irvona has a total area of 0.95 square miles (2.46 km^{2}), of which 0.93 square miles (2.41 km^{2}) is land and 0.02 square miles (0.05 km^{2}), or 2.12%, is water.

== Demographics ==
Historical population
| Census | Pop. | Note | %± |
|---|---|---|---|
| 1900 | 723 | | — |
| 1910 | 800 | | 10.7% |
| 1920 | 1,157 | | 44.6% |
| 1930 | 1,213 | | 4.8% |
| 1940 | 1,049 | | −13.5% |
| 1950 | 915 | | −12.8% |
| 1960 | 781 | | −14.6% |
| 1970 | 714 | | −8.6% |
| 1980 | 644 | | −9.8% |
| 1990 | 666 | | 3.4% |
| 2000 | 680 | | 2.1% |
| 2010 | 647 | | −4.9% |
| 2020 | 549 | | −15.1% |
| 2021 (est.) | 546 | ▼ | −0.5% |

As of the census of 2000, there were 680 people, 241 households, and 182 families residing in the borough. The population density was 1,069.2 inhabitants per square mile (412.8/km^{2}). There were 258 housing units at an average density of 405.7 per square mile (156.6/km^{2}). The racial makeup of the borough was 99.41% White, and 0.59% from two or more races.

There were 241 households, out of which 38.6% had children under the age of 18 living with them, 61.4% were married couples living together, 9.5% had a female householder with no husband present, and 24.1% were non-families. 20.7% of all households were made up of individuals, and 12.4% had someone living alone who was 65 years of age or older. The average household size was 2.82 and the average family size was 3.27.

In the borough, the population was spread out, with 29.6% under the age of 18, 8.5% from 18 to 24, 29.1% from 25 to 44, 22.4% from 45 to 64, and 10.4% who were 65 years of age or older. The median age was 34 years. For every 100 females, there were 101.8 males. For every 100 females age 18 and over, there were 97.1 males.

The median income for a household in the borough was $32,500, and the median income for a family was $39,000. Males had a median income of $26,250 versus $21,719 for females. The per capita income for the borough was $11,785. About 12.4% of families and 15.3% of the population were below the poverty line, including 20.2% of those under age 18 and 16.7% of those age 65 or over.
