= Senator Irwin =

Senator Irwin may refer to:

- Jeff Irwin (politician) (born 1977), Michigan State Senate
- Mitch Irwin (born 1952), Michigan State Senate
- Robert Irwin (North Carolina politician) (1738–1800), North Carolina State Senate
- William Irwin (California politician) (1827–1886), California State Senate

== See also ==
- Senator Erwin (disambiguation)
- Senator Irvin (disambiguation)
