= Senator Erwin =

Senator Erwin may refer to:

- Austin W. Erwin (1887–1965), New York State Senate
- Charles K. Erwin (1837–1907), Wisconsin State Senate
- George Z. Erwin (1840–1894), New York State Senate
- Hank Erwin (born 1949), Alabama State Senate
- James Erwin (politician) (1920–2005), Maine State Senate
- Richard Erwin (1923–2006), North Carolina State Senate

== See also ==
- Senator Irwin (disambiguation)
