= Joseph and His Friend: A Story of Pennsylvania =

1870 American novel

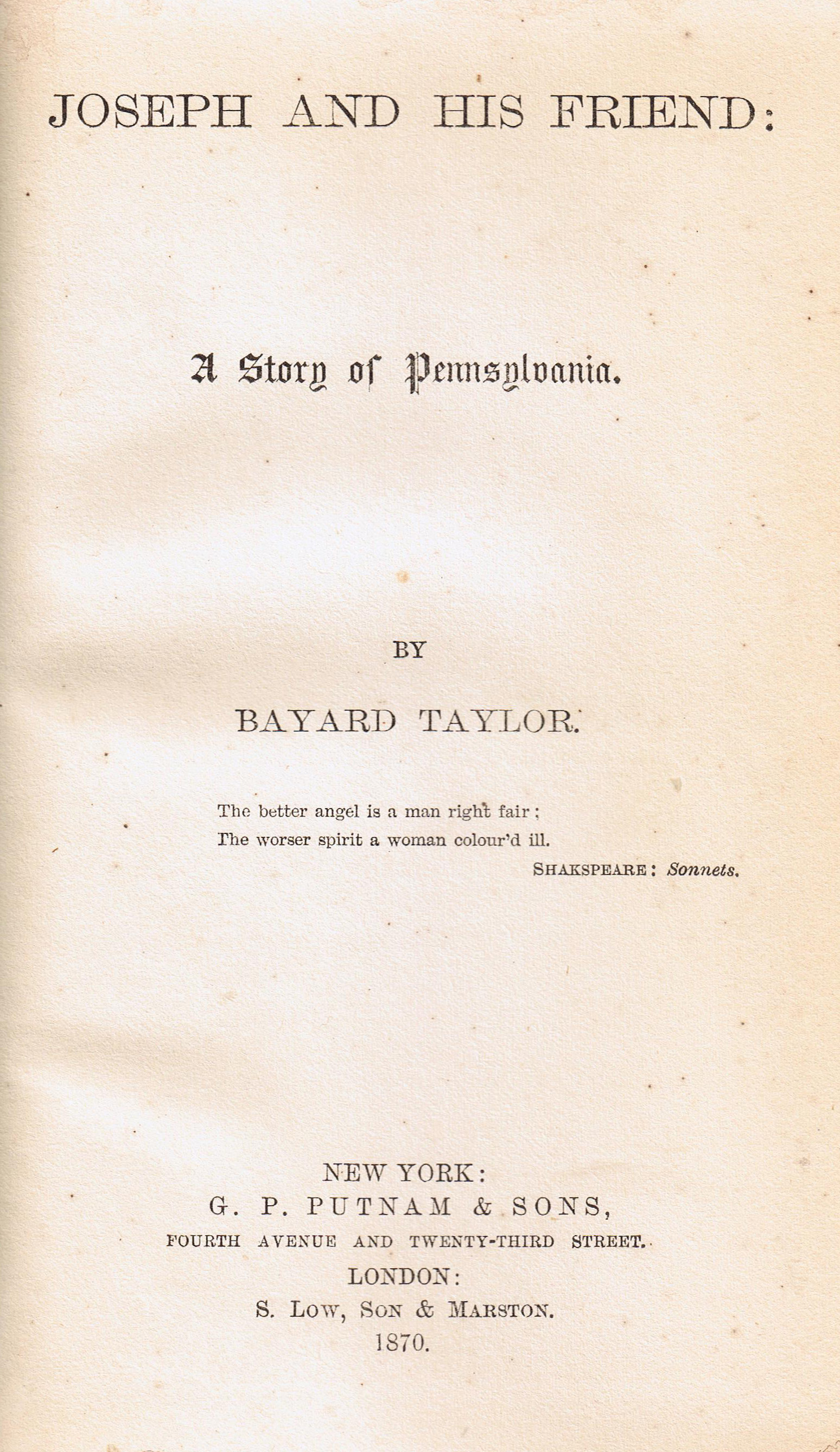
- Author: Bayard Taylor
- Language: English
- Genre: Gay novel
- Publisher: G. P. Putnam's Sons
- Publication date: 1870
- Publication place: United States
- Media type: Print (Hardback)
- Pages: 361 pp

Joseph and His Friend: A Story of Pennsylvania is an 1870 novel by American author Bayard Taylor, a prolific writer in many genres. It presented a special attachment between two men and discussed the nature and significance of such a relationship, romantic but not sexual. Critics are divided in interpreting Taylor's novel as a political argument for homosexual relationships or an idealization of male spirituality.

== Plot ==
The title page carries a quote from Shakespeare's sonnets, Number 144, "Two loves I have of comfort and despair":

The better angel is a man right fair; The worser spirit a woman colour'd ill.

Joseph Aster is a wealthy young farmer in his twenties, with little experience of the world outside of his rural Pennsylvania community. He meets Julia Blessing, a woman from the city, at a gathering for the young people of his community. Joseph quickly becomes interested in Julia, who seems to reciprocate his feelings. They are engaged within a few months.

While returning from a visit to Julia’s family in the city, Joseph is involved in a train crash. He is cared for by a fellow passenger, Philip Held, who is moving to the countryside to oversee a forge. Philip is worldlier than Joseph, and is charmed by Joseph’s innocence. Joseph and Philip immediately take to each other, and soon develop a strong friendship. The romantic undertones of their relationship is evidenced in Philip’s profession of love and “a man’s perfect friendship.”

After he marries Julia, Joseph quickly discovers that she is manipulative and cold-hearted. Julia pushes Joseph to invest more and more in an oil operation on behalf of her father. Meanwhile, she squanders Joseph’s existing wealth on unnecessary and ostentatious additions to his farmhouse. When Joseph finally visits the oil well he has been investing in on the Blessings’ behalf, he discovers that it has little monetary potential. He returns to the countryside, reveals his imminent losses to Julia, and demands that she give up her scheming and greed. Julia’s excitement and anger at Joseph culminate in a fit; when the doctor is called, he explains that she has died, likely from consuming arsenic.

The community comes to suspect that Joseph was involved in his wife's death. Philip launches an extensive investigation to prove Joseph’s innocence. Over the course of a trial, it is revealed that Julia’s death was accidental, and that she had been regularly consuming arsenic in order to improve her complexion.

After the trial, Joseph leaves his community and travels through the frontier on Philip’s advice. When he returns home, he is worldlier and happier with his farming life. Philip realizes that Joseph has fallen in love with Madeline Held, Philip’s sister. He laments that Joseph and Madeline’s romance will “take Joseph further from [his] heart,” but decides that he "must be vicariously happy" for their sake.

== Publication history ==
Joseph and His Friend was the last of Taylor's four novels. It was in the genre then known as the "New England novel". It was the only one to be serialized before publication in book form, with its 33 chapters appearing in The Atlantic Monthly beginning in January 1870 and ending in December. The book was reprinted eight times by 1893, while a German translation was published in 1879 and 1900, and once more in England in 1903. Taylor also wrote a large amount of poetry and travel literature, and later turned to translation, particularly that of Goethe's Faust.

== Literary significance and criticism ==
Near the end of the 19th century, poet and critic Richard Henry Stoddard, in a brief biography of Taylor, described Joseph and His Friend as "an indictment of rural poverty in Pennsylvania". It has been called "America's first homosexual novel" and was inspired in part by the relationship of earlier poets Fitz-Greene Halleck and Joseph Rodman Drake. Taylor's prefatory note to the reader is opaque:

To those who prefer quiet pictures of life to startling incidents, the attempt to illustrate the development of character to the mysteries of an elaborate plot, and the presentation of men and women in their mixed strength and weakness to the painting of wholly virtuous ideals and wholly evil examples: who are as interested in seeing moral and intellectual forces at work in a simple country community as on a more conspicuous place of human action: who believe in the truth and tenderness of man's love for man, as of man's love for woman: who recognize the trouble which confused ideals of life and the lack of high and intellect culture bring upon a great portion of our country population,–to all such, no explanation of this volume is necessary. Others will not read it.

The book was not well received and became the author's least successful and most disliked novel. However, a contemporary reviewer in The Examiner wrote that "although Mr Taylor travels over familiar ground, and has no notable discovery to disclose, the people who figure in his novel are so interesting in themselves and are so agreeably introduced to our notice, that we cannot grudge them a hearty welcome." The novel's failure in comparison with his work in other genres may have caused Taylor to stop writing novels.

A later critic of Taylor, Albert Smyth, found Joseph and His Friend to be "an unpleasant story of mean duplicity and painful mistakes. The characters are shallow and their surroundings mean. There is not a single pleasing situation or incident in the book." According to Robert K. Martin, the novel "is quite explicit in its adoption of a political stance toward homosexuality". As he summarizes the story:

[Joseph] meets Philip Held, with whom he falls in love and who explains to him "the needs" that are often unfulfilled in conventional society. Philip argues for the "rights" of those "who cannot shape themselves according to the common-place pattern of society."

Taylor's biographer Paul C. Wermuth wrote that homosexual themes could not be overlooked in the novel, but "it is by no means certain that the book should be interpreted this way."

Rob Ridinger writes that male friendship was viewed differently in the 1800s than it is today, and the term "homosexual" did not appear in English until twenty years after the publication of Joseph and His Friend. He believes the novel belongs to the nineteenth-century genre of non-sexual romantic friendships between men, to which such authors as Mark Twain, Bret Harte, and Henry James also contributed.

== See also ==
- Better Angel
- Gay literature
- Imre: A Memorandum
- Maurice

== Additional sources ==
- Fone, Byrne (1998). The Columbia Anthology of Gay Literature: Readings from Western Antiquity to the Present Day (1st ed.). New York: Columbia University Press. ISBN 978-0-231-09670-6.
- Gifford, James (2006). Glances Backward: An Anthology of American Homosexual Writing, 1830-1920 (1st ed.). Broadview Press. ISBN 978-1-55111-728-7.
- Mitchell, Mark (1998). Pages Passed from Hand to Hand: The Hidden Tradition of Homosexual Literature in English from 1748 to 1914 (1st ed.). Wilmington, MA: Mariner Books. ISBN 978-0-395-83705-4.
