= Charles John Biddle =

American politician

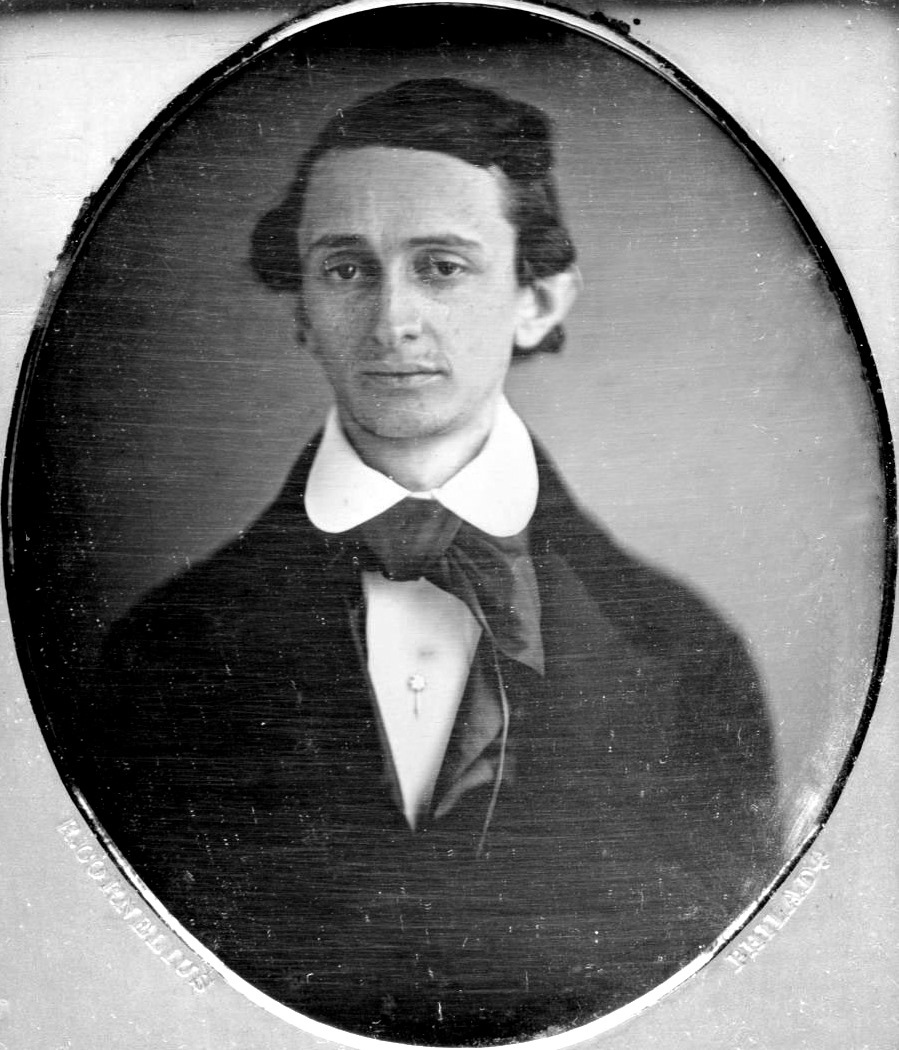

Member of the U.S. House of Representatives from Pennsylvania's 2nd district
- In office July 2, 1861 – March 3, 1863
- Preceded by: Edward J. Morris
- Succeeded by: Charles O'Neill

Personal details
- Born: April 30, 1819 Philadelphia, Pennsylvania, U.S.
- Died: September 28, 1873 (aged 54) Philadelphia, Pennsylvania, U.S.
- Party: Democratic
- Parent: Nicholas Biddle (father)
- Relatives: See Biddle family

Military service
- Allegiance: United States Union
- Branch/service: (United States) Union Army
- Years of service: 1847–1848; 1861–1862
- Rank: Colonel
- Unit: Regiment of Voltigeurs and Foot Riflemen
- Commands: 13th Pennsylvania Reserve Regiment
- Battles/wars: Mexican–American War; American Civil War

Charles John Biddle (April 30, 1819 – September 28, 1873) was an American soldier, lawyer, congressman, and newspaper editor.

== Biography ==
Biddle was born and died in Philadelphia, Pennsylvania. He was the son of Nicholas Biddle, president of the Second Bank of the United States, and nephew of Congressman Richard Biddle. Charles Biddle graduated from Princeton in 1837, where he studied law, and was admitted to the bar in 1840.

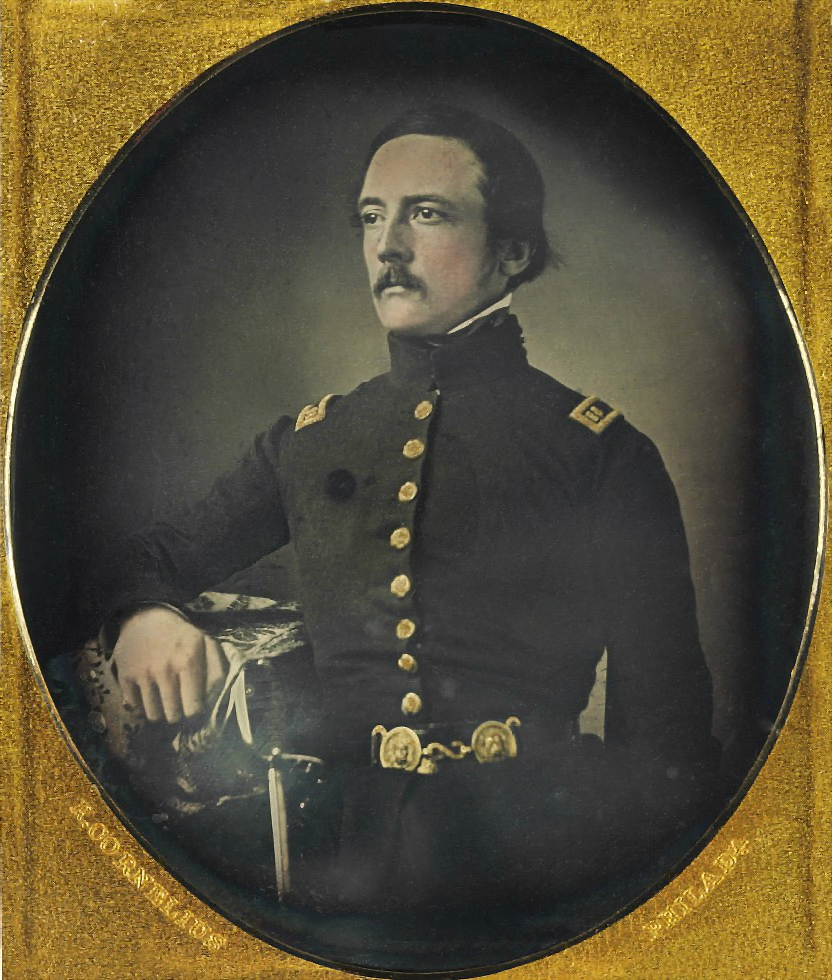
Biddle during the Mexican-American War

Biddle served in the Mexican–American War, serving as captain and company commander in the Regiment of Voltigeurs and Foot Riflemen. He was brevetted to the rank of major for gallantry in the Battle of Chapultepec. At the close of the war, he returned to Philadelphia to practice law.

In May 1861, following the outbreak of the American Civil War and President Abraham Lincoln's call to arms, he was appointed a lieutenant colonel in the Pennsylvania Reserves, rising in May to the rank of colonel in command of the 42nd Pennsylvania Volunteers Infantry (13th Reserves), also known as the 1st Pennsylvania Rifles. In October of that year he was elected to the Thirty-seventh United States Congress to fill the vacancy caused by the resignation of Edward J. Morris. He was tendered a commission as a brigadier general, but declined it, and then resigned from the army in February 1862.

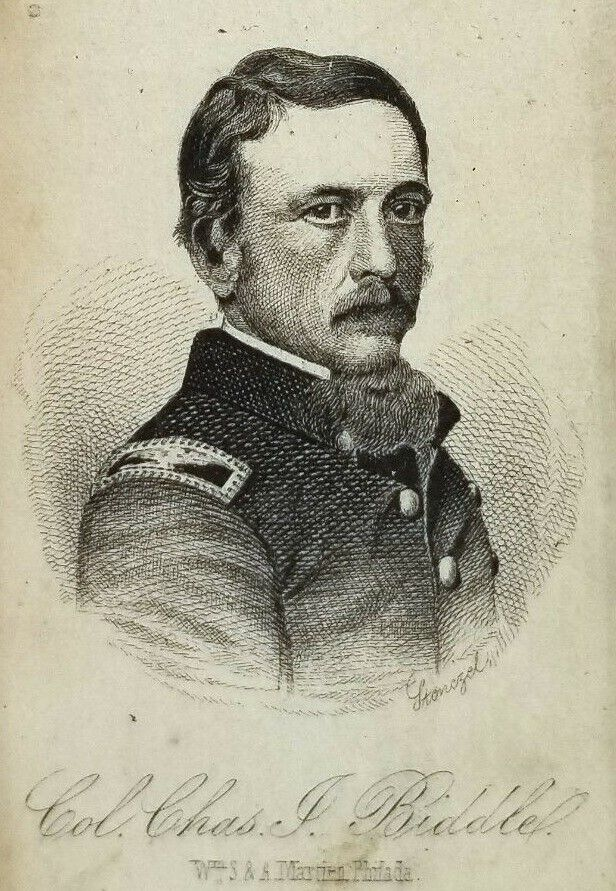

After the war, he became one of the proprietors and editor-in-chief of the Philadelphia Age, and retained that position for the remainder of his life. His literary work was confined mainly to editorial contributions to the columns of this journal. His only separate publication was The Case of Major André, a carefully prepared essay read before the Historical Society of Pennsylvania, which vindicated the action of George Washington. The immediate occasion was a passage in Lord Mahon's History of England that denounced the execution of André as the greatest blot upon Washington's record. By an authority so high as the London Critic, this essay was subsequently pronounced a fair refutation of Lord Mahon's charge.

== Notes ==
U.S. House of Representatives
Preceded by Edward J. Morris	Member of the U.S. House of Representatives from Pennsylvania's 2nd congressional district 1861–1863	Succeeded by Charles O'Neill
