= Turner Ashby =

Confederate cavalry officer of the American Civil War (1828-1862)

Turner Ashby Jr.
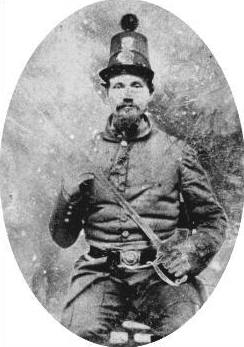
- Born: October 23, 1828; Fauquier County, Virginia, U.S
- Died: June 6, 1862 (aged 33); Harrisonburg, Virginia
- Burial place: Stonewall Cemetery, Winchester, Virginia
- Military career
- Allegiance: Confederate States of America
- Branch: Confederate States Army Cavalry
- Service years: 1861–62
- Rank: Captain (Virginia Militia); Colonel (CSA); Brigadier General (unconfirmed)
- Nicknames: "Black Knight of the Confederacy" "White Knight of the Shenandoah Valley"
- Commands: 7th Virginia Cavalry
- Conflicts: American Civil War: Manassas campaign; Battle of Bolivar Heights; Valley campaign; First Battle of Kernstown; Battle of Front Royal; Battle of Good's Farm †

Turner Ashby Jr. (October 23, 1828 – June 6, 1862) was a Confederate cavalry commander in the American Civil War.

In his youth, he organized an informal cavalry company known as the Mountain Rangers, which became part of the 7th Virginia Cavalry ("Ashby's Cavalry"). On the outbreak of the Civil War, Ashby and his troopers were assigned to the Virginia Militia command of Colonel Thomas J. "Stonewall" Jackson. Although Jackson's Valley campaign owed much to Ashby's reconnaissance and screening, Ashby was criticized by Jackson for the lax training and discipline of his men. By the time Ashby was killed, leading his men at the Battle of Good's Farm near Harrisonburg, he had received his general’s star. However, Ashby's official rank is contested as the promotion was not confirmed until after his death.

== Early years ==
Turner Ashby Jr. was born at Rose Bank Plantation near Markham in Fauquier County, Virginia, to Turner Ashby Sr. and Dorothea Green Ashby. As a child he often played in the waters of nearby Goose Creek, and had a pet wolf named "Lupus" that neighbors demanded he get rid of. His father died when he was young, so his mother hired a tutor for Turner and his brother, then sent him to Major Ambler's school nearby, but Ashby preferred wandering the countryside rather than classes. In later years, he bought a residence near his childhood home and named it Wolfe's Crag. An accomplished horseman at an early age, Ashby often participated in tournaments, and won many, including once dressed as an Indian chief and riding with neither bridle nor saddle.

With a partner, Ashby ran a mill on his father's property until his mother sold it to neighbor Edward Carrington Marshall of the Manassas Gap Railroad. Ashby enjoyed modest success at both business and farming.

== Virginia militiaman ==
Knowing that his father had fought as a colonel in the War of 1812, and his grandfather Jack Ashby served as a captain during the American Revolutionary War, Ashby while in his 20s organized a cavalry company of his friends that became known as the "Mountain Rangers," initially to keep order among laborers on the Manassas Gap Railroad, some of whom tended to get into drunken brawls. Among the Rangers were E.C. Marshall's nephews Thomas Marshall, James Jones Marshall and Lewis Fielding Marshall (all grandsons of Chief Justice John Marshall, who mostly resided in Richmond, Virginia or Washington, D.C., but spent the summers at his Oak Hill plantation in Fauquier County run by his son and later this grandson Thomas Marshall, also a member of the Rangers and who would die in battle in late 1864). Upon learning of John Brown's raid at Harpers Ferry, the Mountain Rangers met at Harper's Ferry, where some performed guard duty at Charles Town during Brown's trial and execution and the unit was formally absorbed into the Virginia Militia. Ashby later told his friend Major Lewis A. Armistead that the Civil War really began with John Brown's insurrection, and that those behind Brown would keep on until they forced the South to secede.

Ashby avidly followed politics and ran for the state legislature, but as a Whig (the minority party in Fauquier County) and follower of Henry Clay, he failed to win election. After the start of the Civil War, though he'd disapproved of secession, when it became obvious that Virginia would secede, Ashby told his Mountain Rangers to again meet at Harper's Ferry. This time they became Company A of the 7th Virginia Cavalry, also known as "Ashby's Brigade" or the "Laurel Brigade" after a common plant in Virginia's Mountains. Ashby soon persuaded Governor John Letcher to order the militia to capture the federal arsenal at Harpers Ferry. When secession was approved, Ashby made his move, but U.S. forces burned most of the arsenal buildings and 15,000 small arms before he could arrive.

== Civil War ==
At Harpers Ferry, Ashby was assigned to the Virginia Militia command of Colonel Thomas J. "Stonewall" Jackson, whom he had met at Harpers Ferry and Charles Town in 1859. Ashby was initially assigned to guard fords across the Potomac River and bridges from Harpers Ferry to Point of Rocks, Maryland. He became known for visiting his pickets on long horseback rides (50-miles while guarding the Potomac, later 70 miles when guarding Stonewall Jackson's rear during the Valley Campaign), as well as for interfering with scouting operations of various Union forces. Ashby's men assisted Maryland men with Confederate sympathies to pass into Virginia, and they disrupted railroad traffic on the Baltimore and Ohio Railroad as well as interfered with the Chesapeake and Ohio Canal (including blowing up Dam No. 5 upon Jackson's orders when others had failed). Ashby's brother Richard was killed skirmishing with a Union patrol along the Potomac in June 1861. Hearing rumors that his brother had been bayoneted while trying to surrender, Ashby examined the corpse, came to hate Northerners and became obsessed with revenge.

Captain Ashby played a pivotal role in securing arms and machinery from Harpers Ferry in April 17–18, 1861, which enabled the Richmond Armory to produce the Confederate Richmond rifle, a .58-caliber percussion-lock rifle-musket closely based on the U.S. Model 1855.

On July 23, 1861, Brigadier General Joseph E. Johnston appointed Ashby lieutenant colonel of the 7th Virginia Cavalry. Due to the illness of the regimental commander, Col. Angus McDonald, Ashby had effective control of half of the regiment, which he operated separately. When the commander retired in February 1862, Ashby assumed command of the entire regiment on March 12. Ashby organized the first Confederate horse artillery, named Chew's Battery, as part of this regiment. The 7th did not participate directly in the First Battle of Manassas, arriving on July 22, but Ashby aided the Confederate cause by screening the movement of Johnston's army to the Manassas area. The Union had hoped that Johnston's forces would be pinned down by Major General Robert Patterson, but Ashby's screen allowed Johnston to move freely without Patterson's interference. In October 1861, Ashby led an attack on Harpers Ferry, the armory having returned to Union control, but lost to Union forces led by Colonel John W. Geary in what became known as the "Battle of Bolivar Heights".

By the spring of 1862, the 7th Virginia Cavalry had reached the enormous size of 27 infantry and cavalry companies, much larger than a typical Civil War regiment, plus Ashby lacked staff officers and had lax discipline despite his tireless patrols of the long picket lines. Stonewall Jackson, in overall command of the Shenandoah Valley, tried to strip Ashby of his cavalry forces, ordering them to be assigned to two infantry brigades. When Ashby threatened to resign in protest, Jackson backed down. Jackson continued to resist Ashby's promotion to brigadier general, due to his informal military training and lax discipline. Nevertheless, Ashby's promotion came through on May 23, 1862, and he received his promotion and general's star in a ceremony at the Taylor Hotel in Winchester, Virginia.

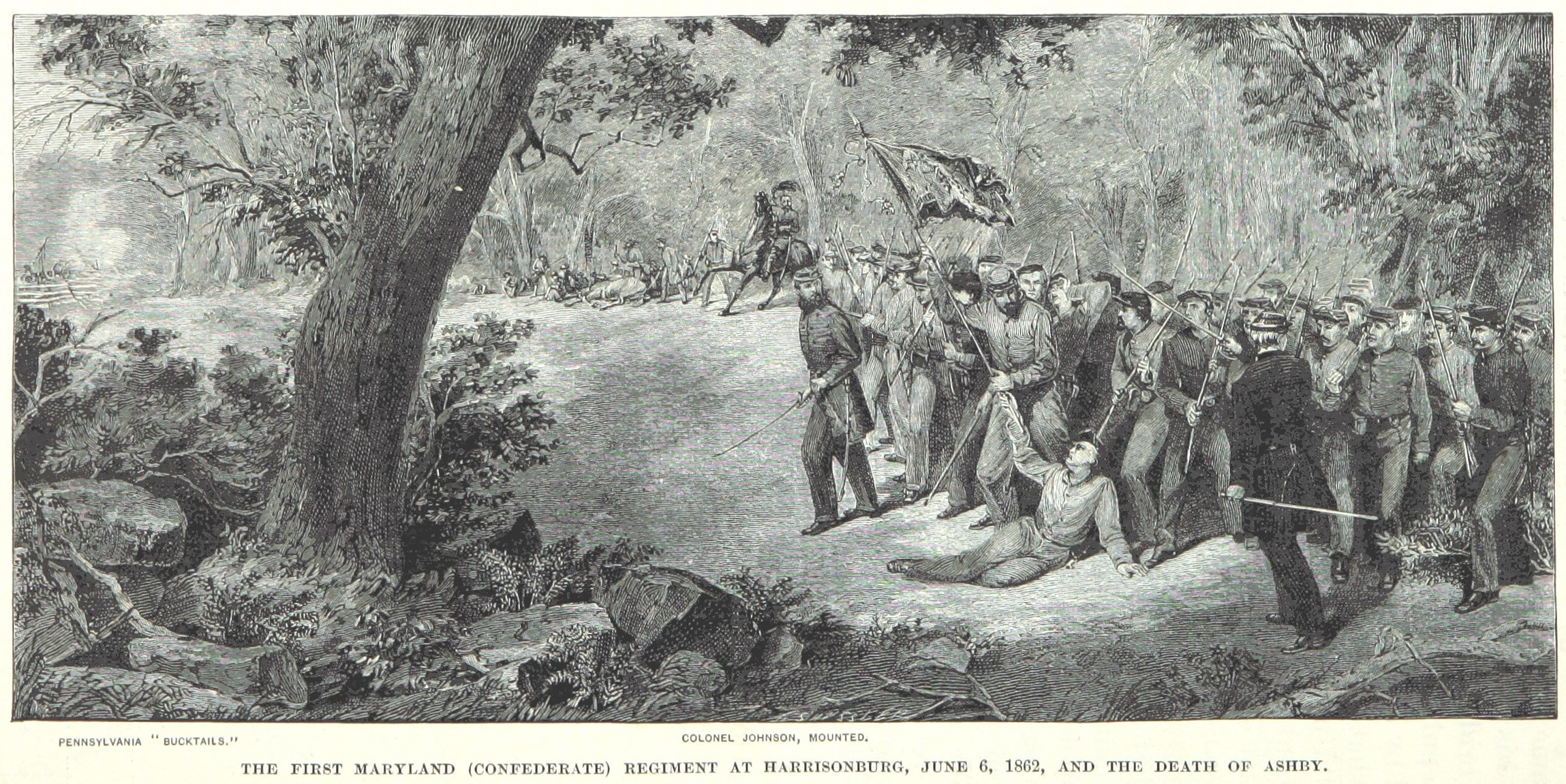
Ashby's death at Good's Farm

Ashby's vigorous reconnaissance and screening were factors in the success of Jackson's Valley campaign in the Shenandoah Valley in 1862. However, Ashby failed Jackson in some instances. At the First Battle of Kernstown, Jackson attacked a retreating Union column that Ashby had estimated to be four regiments of infantry, about the size of Jackson's force. It turned out to be an entire division of 9,000 men, and Jackson was forced to retreat. At the First Battle of Winchester, as Union forces under Maj. Gen. Nathaniel P. Banks were retreating, Ashby failed to cut off their retreat because his troopers were plundering captured wagons.

As Jackson's army withdrew from the pressure of Maj. Gen. John C. Frémont's superior forces, moving from Harrisonburg toward Port Republic, Ashby commanded the rear guard. On June 6, 1862, near Harrisonburg, the 1st New Jersey Cavalry attacked Ashby's position at Good's Farm. Although Ashby defeated the cavalry attack, the following infantry engagement resulted in his horse being shot, so Ashby charged ahead on foot. After only a few steps, he was shot through the heart, killing him instantly. (The origin of the fatal shot remains unclear. Soldiers of the 13th Pennsylvania Reserve Infantry, the "Bucktails", claimed credit, but some accounts blame it on friendly fire.) His last words were "Charge, men! For God's sake. Charge!" waving his sword, when a bullet pierced him in the breast and he fell dead."

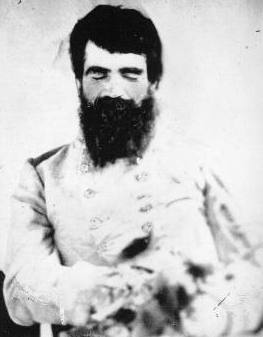
Turner Ashby, post-mortem photograph as he lay in state

He had been appointed brigadier general just two weeks before his death. Although he is sometimes referred to as a general and his name often appears in lists of Confederate generals, his appointment as brigadier general was never confirmed by the Confederate Senate. He died two weeks after his appointment and the Confederate Senate did not act to confirm the appointment during that time.

== Legacy ==
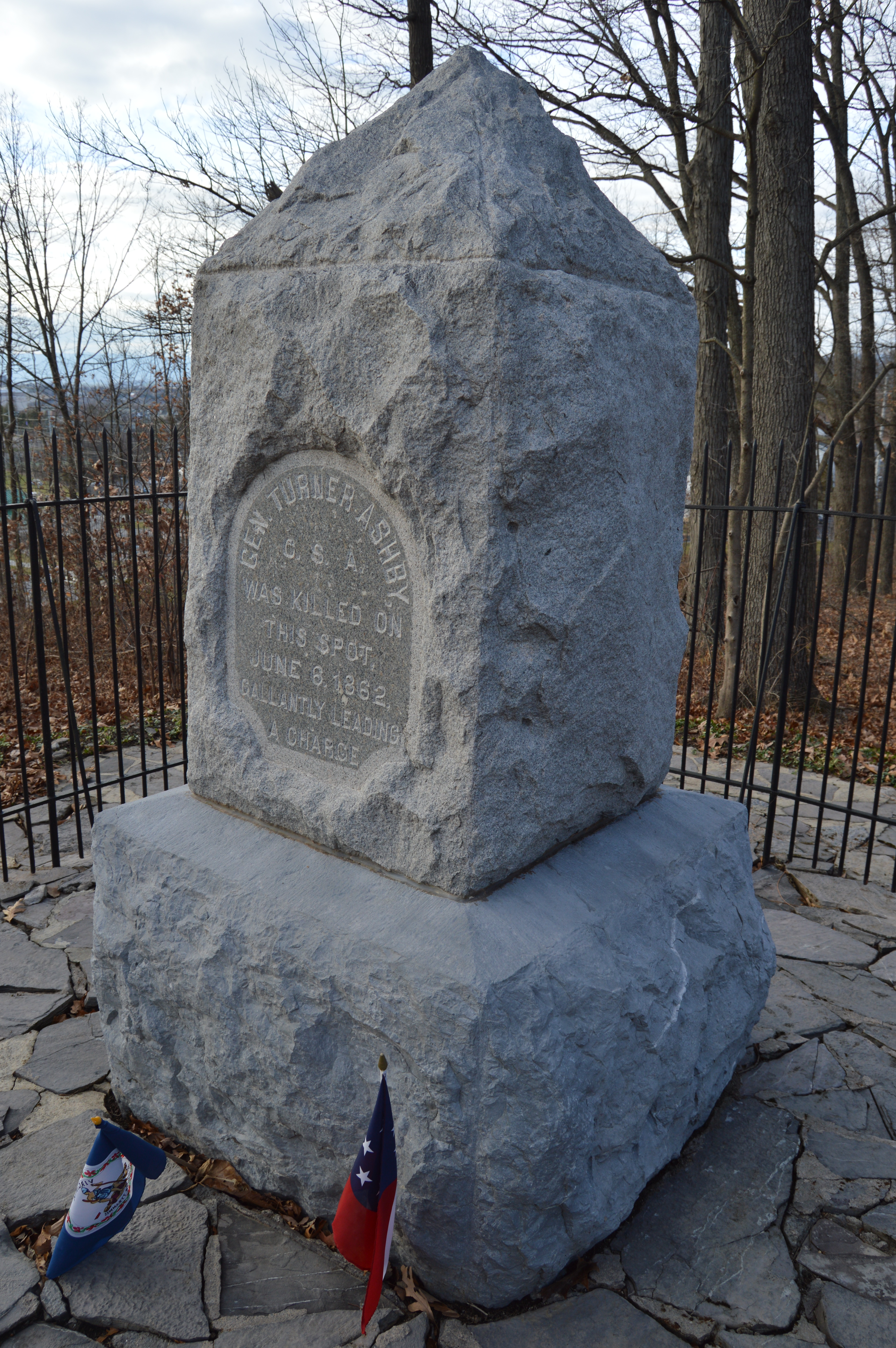
Turner Ashby Monument at the site of his death

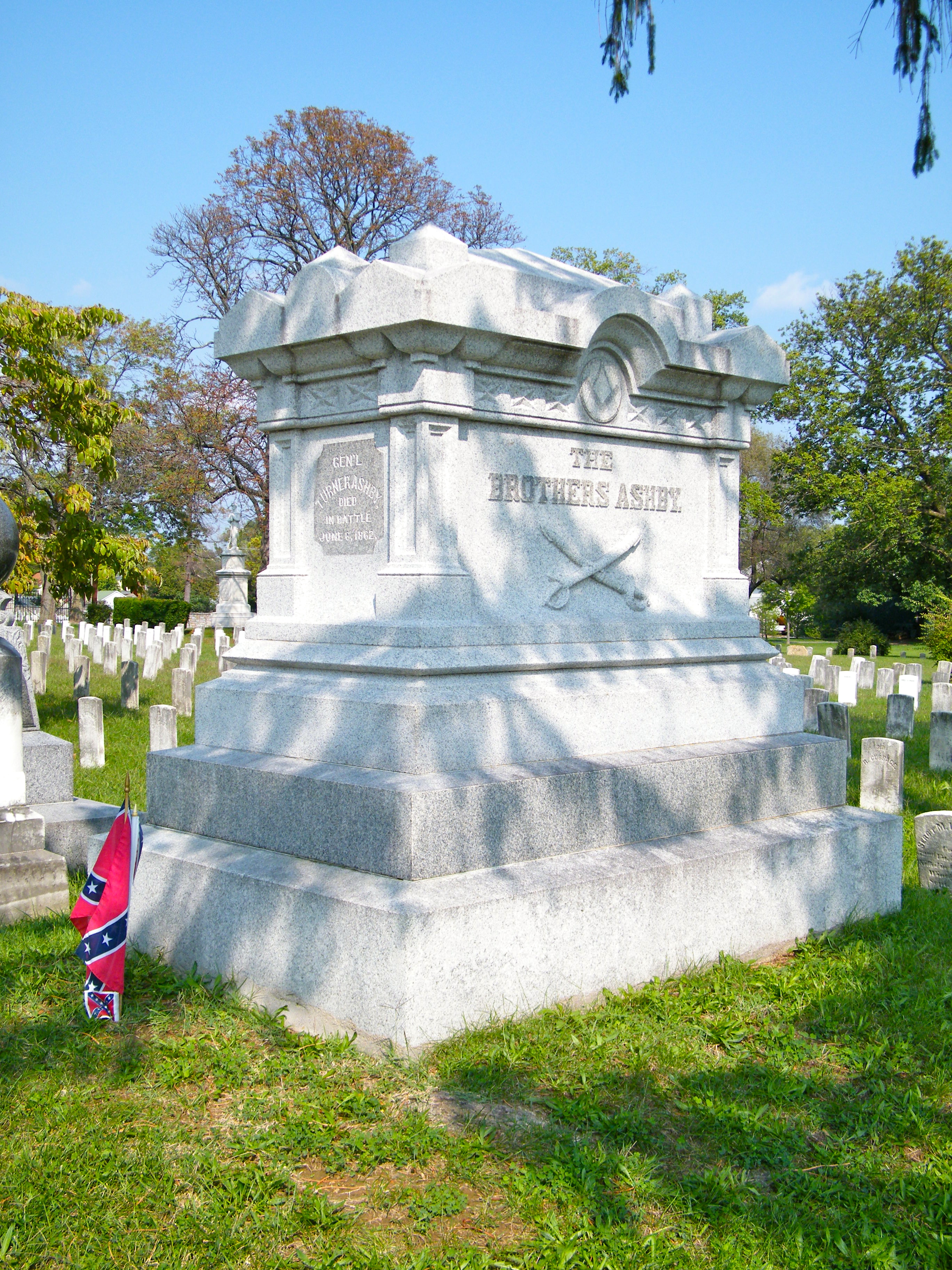
Ashby's tomb in Winchester, Virginia

Stonewall Jackson's report of the engagement sums up the man (although considering Jackson's resistance to Ashby's promotion, the eulogy might be an exaggeration in favor of the young man):

As a partisan officer I never knew his superior; his daring was proverbial; his powers of endurance almost incredible; his tone of character heroic, and his sagacity almost intuitive in divining the purposes and movements of the enemy.

Ashby was buried at the University of Virginia Cemetery, but in October 1866, his body was reinterred at the Stonewall Cemetery in Winchester, Virginia, next to the body of his younger brother Richard Ashby, who was killed in Hampshire County in a skirmish with Union soldiers in 1861. The Turner Ashby Monument can be found in Harrisonburg, Virginia, at the spot where Ashby was fatally shot in the Battle of Harrisonburg at Chestnut Ridge.

In 1914 the Neale Publishing Company published Life of Turner Ashby, a biography of Ashby by his kinsman Thomas Ashby.

Turner Ashby High School, in Bridgewater, Virginia, is named after the general. Ashby Lee Elementary School in Quicksburg, Virginia is named after Turner Ashby and Robert E. Lee.

== See also ==
- List of American Civil War generals (Acting Confederate)
