= Bayard Taylor =

American poet, novelist and travel writer (1825–1878)

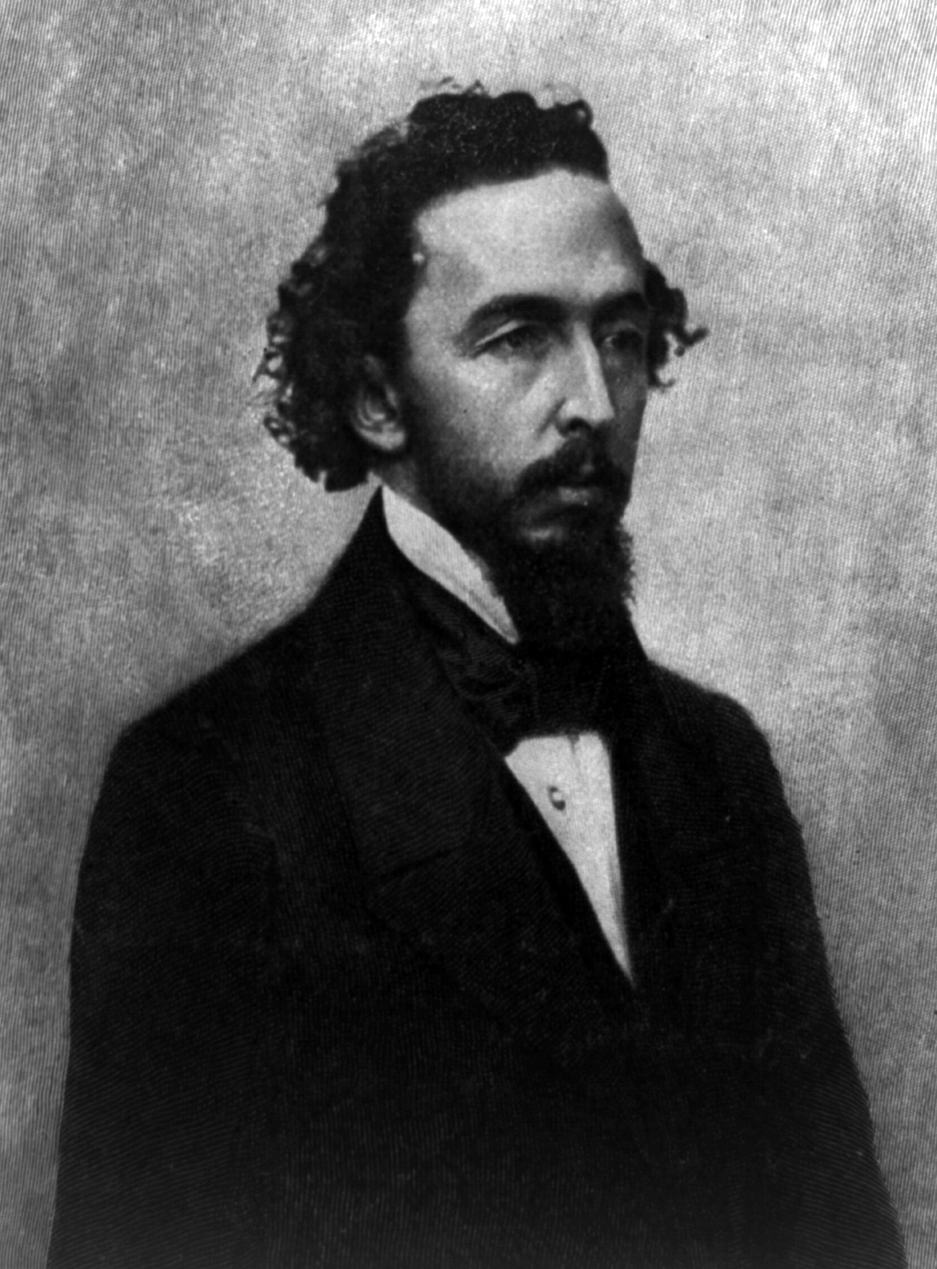
- Born: January 11, 1825; Chester County, Pennsylvania, U.S.
- Died: December 19, 1878 (aged 53); Berlin, German Empire
- Resting place: Longwood Cemetery, Kennett Square, Pennsylvania
- Children: Lillian Bayard Taylor Kiliani
- Relatives: Charles Frederick Taylor (brother)

Bayard Taylor (January 11, 1825 – December 19, 1878) was an American poet, literary critic, translator, travel writer, and diplomat. As a poet, he was very popular, with a crowd of more than 4,000 attending a poetry reading once, which was a record that stood for 85 years. His travelogues were popular in both the United States and Great Britain. He served in diplomatic posts in Russia and Prussia.

== Life and work ==
Taylor was born on January 11, 1825, in Kennett Square in Chester County, Pennsylvania. He was the fourth son, the first to survive to maturity, of the Quaker couple Joseph and Rebecca (née Way) Taylor. His mother was of half Swiss origin. His father was a wealthy farmer. Bayard's youngest brother was Charles Frederick Taylor, a Union Army colonel killed in action at the Battle of Gettysburg in 1863.

Bayard received his early instruction in an academy at West Chester, Pennsylvania, and later at nearby Unionville. At the age of seventeen, he was apprenticed to a printer in West Chester. The influential critic and editor Rufus Wilmot Griswold encouraged him to write poetry. The volume that resulted, Ximena, or the Battle of the Sierra Morena, and other Poems, was published in 1844 and dedicated to Griswold.

Using the money from his poetry and an advance for travel articles, he visited parts of England, France, Germany and Italy, making largely pedestrian tours for almost two years. He sent accounts of his travels to the New York Tribune, The Saturday Evening Post, and Gazette of the United States.

In 1846, a collection of his articles was published in two volumes as Views Afoot, or Europe seen with Knapsack and Staff. That publication resulted in an invitation to serve as an editorial assistant for Graham's Magazine for a few months in 1848. That same year, Horace Greeley, editor of the New York Tribune, hired Taylor and sent him to California to report on the gold rush. He returned by way of Mexico and published another two-volume collection of travel essays, El Dorado; or, Adventures in the Path of Empire (1850). Within two weeks of release, the books sold 10,000 copies in the U.S. and 30,000 in Great Britain.

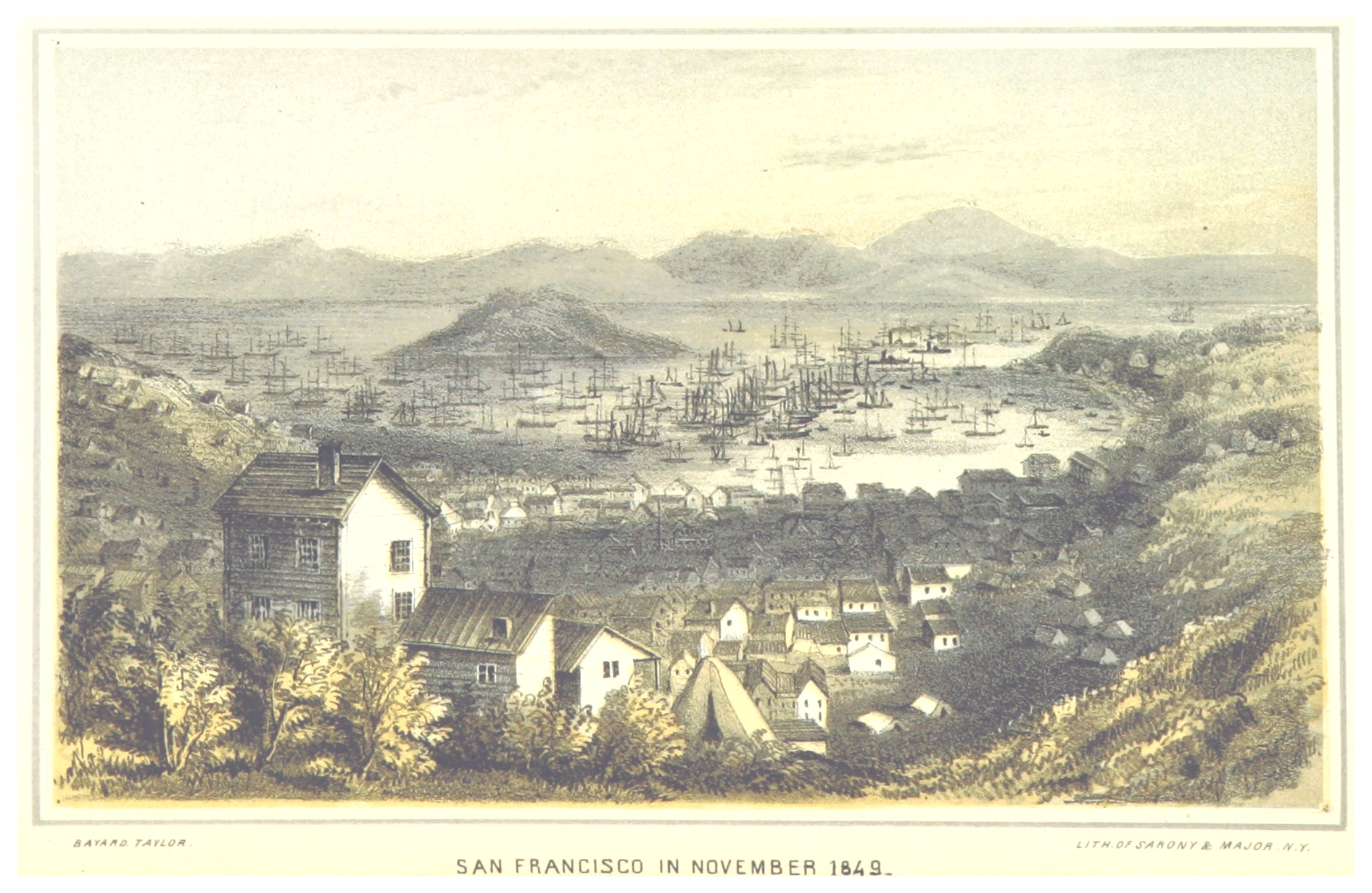
Illustration of San Francisco in November 1849, from publication El Dorado.

In 1849 Taylor married Mary Agnew, who died of tuberculosis the next year. That same year, Taylor won a popular competition sponsored by P. T. Barnum to write an ode for the "Swedish Nightingale", singer Jenny Lind. His poem "Greetings to America" was set to music by Julius Benedict and performed by the singer at numerous concerts on her tour of the United States.

In 1851 he traveled to Egypt, where he followed the Nile River as far as 12° 30' N. He also traveled in Palestine and Mediterranean countries, writing poetry based on his experiences. "In August 1852, upon my return to Europe from a trip to the East, I finally had the opportunity to visit Greece. We sailed between the fortresses guarding the entrance of the Dardanelles and made a stop at Scio before anchoring in the harbor of Syra. The Piraeus was just twelve hours away, but considering my recent bout of fever in Constantinople, I hesitated to face the scorching summer heat of Athens. We lifted anchor and set our course southward, passing through the clusters of islands in the Cyclades, under a clear sky and over a sea of the most brilliant blue. Moreover, I had reasons to hasten my journey to Italy and Germany."

Toward the end of 1852, he sailed from England to Calcutta, and then to China, where he joined the expedition of Commodore Matthew Calbraith Perry to Japan. The results of these journeys were published as A Journey to Central Africa; or, Life and Landscapes from Egypt to the Negro Kingdoms of the White Nile (1854); The Lands of the Saracen; or, Pictures of Palestine, Asia Minor, Sicily and Spain (1854); and A Visit to India, China and Japan in the Year 1853 (1855).

He returned to the U.S. on December 20, 1853, and undertook a successful public lecturer tour that extended from Maine to Wisconsin. After two years, he went to northern Europe to study Swedish life, language and literature. The trip inspired his long narrative poem Lars. His series of articles Swedish Letters to the Tribune were republished as Northern Travel: Summer and Winter Pictures (1857).

In Berlin in 1856, Taylor met the great German scientist Alexander von Humboldt, hoping to interview him for the New York Tribune. Humboldt was welcoming, and inquired whether they should speak English or German. Taylor planned to go to central Asia, where Humboldt had traveled in 1829. Taylor informed Humboldt of Washington Irving's death; Humboldt had met him in Paris. He saw Humboldt again in 1857 at Potsdam.

In October 1857, he married Maria Hansen, the daughter of the Danish/German astronomer Peter Hansen. The couple spent the following winter in Greece. "Now we embarked on our journey to Athens, feeling the chill of the sharp wind and gazing upon the barren fields illuminated by the full moon. As we passed by, we noticed that the streets along the wharves were well-paved, and the better-quality houses were constructed with stone. It didn't take long before we left the town behind and found ourselves on the road that leads almost directly to Athens. After an hour, some olive trees came into view, and we crossed the Cephissus River, but then we were greeted by more desolate and colder bare fields. The cold, gray tone of everything, the starkness and desolation of our surroundings, the sight of the modern town, and the piercing cold air all combined to create a disheartening impression upon me. However, when we reached Hermes Street and arrived at our hotel, things started to look much more cheerful and promising. Once we stepped inside that building, our disappointment faded away – we even forgot about Athens momentarily – as a Christmas dinner awaited us, and there were other places and people to be remembered."

In 1859 Taylor returned to the American West and lectured at San Francisco.

In 1862, he was appointed to the U.S. diplomatic service as secretary of legation at St. Petersburg, and acting minister to Russia for a time during 1862–3 after the resignation of Ambassador Simon Cameron.

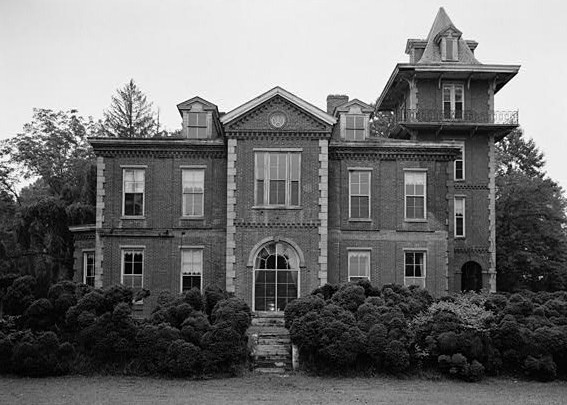
Cedarcroft, Taylor's home.

He published his first novel Hannah Thurston in 1863. The newspaper The New York Times first praised him for "break[ing] new ground with such assured success". A second much longer appreciation in the same newspaper was thoroughly negative, describing "one pointless, aimless situation leading to another of the same stamp, and so on in maddening succession". It concluded: "The platitudes and puerilities which might otherwise only raise a smile, when confronted with such pompous pretensions, excite the contempt of every man who has in him the feeblest instincts of common honesty in literature." It proved successful enough for his publisher to announce another novel from him the next year.

In 1864 Taylor and his wife Maria returned to the U.S. In 1866, Taylor traveled to Colorado and made a large loop through the northern mountains on horseback with a group that included William Byers, editor of the newspaper Rocky Mountain News. His letters describing this adventure were later compiled and published as Colorado: A Summer Trip.

In 1866, Taylor popularized outlaw James Fitzpatrick as swashbuckling hero Sandy Flash in his novel The Story of Kennett, set in Revolutionary War-era Pennsylvania.

Taylor's novel Joseph and His Friend: A Story of Pennsylvania (1870), first serialized in The Atlantic, was described as a story of young man in rural Pennsylvania and "the troubles which arise from the want of a broader education and higher culture." The story is believed to be based on the poets Fitz-Greene Halleck and Joseph Rodman Drake, and since the late 20th century has been called America's first gay novel. (A revealing letter of 1847 survives from Taylor to the twenty-three-year-old Edward Paxson, later Chief Justice of the Pennsylvania Supreme Court, in which he writes: 'Dear Paxson: Your interesting and astonishing epistle was received a little while ago...Now, that you yourself wear the fetters matrimonial, you are not going to dream me into them so easily.') Taylor spoke at the dedication of a monument to Halleck in his native town, Guilford, Connecticut. He said that in establishing this monument to an American poet "we symbolize the intellectual growth of the American people.... The life of the poet who sleeps here represents the long period of transition between the appearance of American poetry and the creation of an appreciative and sympathetic audience for it."

Taylor imitated and parodied the writings of various poets in Diversions of the Echo Club (London, 1873; Boston, 1876). In 1874 Taylor traveled to Iceland to report for the Tribune on the one thousandth anniversary of the first European settlement there.

On July 4, 1876, at the Centennial Exposition in Philadelphia, Bayard recited his National Ode to an enthusiastic crowd of more than four thousand, the largest audience for a poetry reading in the United States to that date and a record which stood until 1961. The ode was written at the request of the exhibition's organizers, after the task had been declined by several other eminent poets, including John Greenleaf Whittier and Henry Wadsworth Longfellow. The work was reprinted in newspapers across the country and later published as a book in two separate editions.

During March 1878, the U.S. Senate confirmed his appointment as United States Minister to Prussia. Mark Twain, who traveled to Europe on the same ship, was envious of Taylor's command of German. "In 1878, when traveling on the same ship from the United States to Europe, he told me, "I am going abroad to visit some countries I have not seen before. I plan to explore them on foot. I have been working for a long time and need some rest. Additionally, I aim to learn the German language and further develop my skills in art.""

Taylor's travel writings were widely quoted by congressmen seeking to defend racial discrimination. Richard Townshend (D-IL) quoted passages from Taylor such as "the Chinese are morally, the most debased people on the face of the earth" and "A Chinese city is the greatest of all abominations."

A few months after arriving in Berlin, Taylor died there on December 19, 1878. His body was returned to the U.S. and buried in Longwood Cemetery, Kennett Square, Pennsylvania. The New York Times published his obituary on its front page, referring to him as "a great traveler, both on land and paper". Shortly after his death, Henry Wadsworth Longfellow wrote a memorial poem in Taylor's memory, at the urging of Oliver Wendell Holmes Sr.

== Legacy and honors ==
- Cedarcroft, Taylor's home from 1859 to 1874, which he built near Kennett Square, is preserved as a National Historic Landmark.

As of 08/16/2023, Cedarcroft, at 108 Gatehouse Dr.in Kennett Square, PA. was sold for $990K according to Zillow.

- The Bayard Taylor School was added to the National Register of Historic Places in 1988.
- The Bayard Taylor Memorial Library is in Kennett Square.

== Evaluations ==
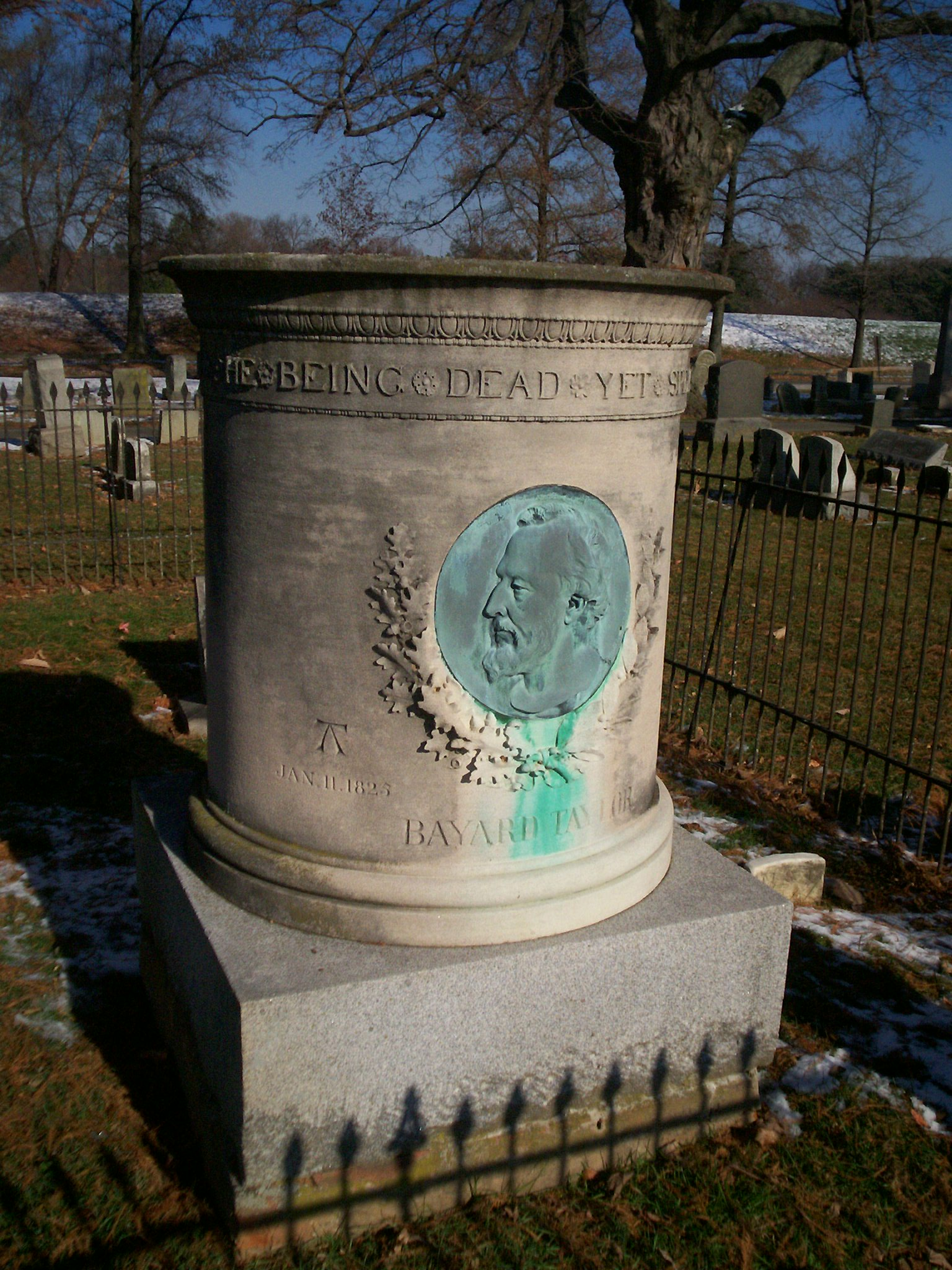
Grave of Bayard Taylor in Kennett Square, Pennsylvania

Though he wanted to be known most as a poet, Taylor was mostly recognized as a travel writer during his lifetime. Modern critics have generally accepted him as technically skilled in verse, but lacking imagination and, ultimately, consider his work as a conventional example of 19th-century sentimentalism.

His translation of Faust, however, was recognized for its scholarly skill and remained in print through 1969. According to the 1920 edition of Encyclopedia Americana:

It is by his translation of Faust, one of the finest attempts of the kind in any literature, that Taylor is generally known; yet as an original poet he stands well up in the second rank of Americans. His Poems of the Orient and his Pennsylvania ballads comprise his best work. His verse is finished and sonorous, but at times over-rhetorical.

According to the 1911 edition of Encyclopædia Britannica:

Taylor's most ambitious productions in poetry—- his Masque of the Gods (Boston, 1872), Prince Deukalion; a lyrical drama (Boston, 1878), The Picture of St John (Boston, 1866), Lars; a Pastoral of Norway (Boston, 1873), and The Prophet; a tragedy (Boston, 1874)—- are marred by a ceaseless effort to overstrain his power. But he will be remembered by his poetic and excellent translation of Goethe's Faust (2 vols, Boston, 1870–71) in the original metres.

Taylor felt, in all truth, the torment and the ecstasy of verse; but, as a critical friend has written of him, his nature was so ardent, so full-blooded, that slight and common sensations intoxicated him, and he estimated their effect, and his power to transmit it to others, beyond the true value. He had, from the earliest period at which he began to compose, a distinct lyrical faculty: so keen indeed was his ear that he became too insistently haunted by the music of others, pre-eminently of Tennyson. But he had often a true and fine note of his own. His best short poems are The Metempsychosis of the Pine and the well-known Bedouin love-song.

In his critical essays Bayard Taylor had himself in no inconsiderable degree what he wrote of as that pure poetic insight which is the vital spirit of criticism. The most valuable of these prose dissertations are the Studies in German Literature (New York, 1879).

In Appletons' Cyclopædia of American Biography of 1889, Edmund Clarence Stedman gives the following critique:

His poetry is striking for qualities that appeal to the ear and eye, finished, sonorous in diction and rhythm, at times too rhetorical, but rich in sound, color, and metrical effects. His early models were Byron and Shelley, and his more ambitious lyrics and dramas exhibit the latter's peculiar, often vague, spirituality. Lars, somewhat after the manner of Tennyson, is his longest and most attractive narrative poem. Prince Deukalion was designed for a masterpiece; its blank verse and choric interludes are noble in spirit and mould. Some of Taylor's songs, oriental idyls, and the true and tender Pennsylvanian ballads, have passed into lasting favor, and show the native quality of his poetic gift. His fame rests securely upon his unequalled rendering of Faust in the original metres, of which the first and second parts appeared in 1870 and 1871. His commentary upon Part II for the first time interpreted the motive and allegory of that unique structure.

== Published works ==
- Ximena, or the Battle of the Sierra Morena, and other Poems (1844)
- Views Afoot, or Europe seen with Knapsack and Staff (1846)
- Rhymes of Travel: Ballads and Poems (1849)
- El Dorado; or, Adventures in the Path of Empire (1850)
- Romances, Lyrics, and Songs (1852)
- A Journey to Central Africa; or, Life and Landscapes from Egypt to the Negro Kingdoms of the White Nile (1854)
- A Visit to India, China, and Japan in the Year 1853 (1855)
- Poems of the Orient (Boston: Ticknor and Fields, 1855)
- Poems of Home and Travel (1856)
- Cyclopedia of Modern Travel (1856)
- Northern Travel: Summer and Winter Pictures (1857)
- The Lands of the Saracen; or, Pictures of Palestine, Asia Minor, Sicily and Spain. (1859)
- The Life, Travels and Books of Alexander Von Humboldt (1859)
- At Home and Abroad, First Series: A Sketch-book of Life, Scenery, and Men (1859)
- Cyclopaedia of Modern Travel, volume I (1861)
- Prose Writings: India, China, and Japan (1862)
- Travels in Greece and Russia, with an Excursion to Crete (1859)
- Poet's Journal (1863)
- Hanna Thurston (1863)
- John Godfrey's Fortunes Related by Himself: A Story of American Life (1864)
- A Cruise on Lake Ladoga (1864)
- The Poems of Bayard Taylor (1865)
- The Story of Kennett (1866)
- A Visit to the Balearic Islands, Complete in Two Parts (1867)
- The Picture of St. John (1867)
- Colorado: A Summer Trip (1867)
- The Little Land Of Appenzell (1867)
- The Island of Maddalena with a Distant View of Caprera (1868)
- The Land of Paoli (1868)
- Catalonian Bridle-Roads (1868)
- The Kyffhauser and Its Legend (1868)
- By-Ways of Europe (1869)
- Joseph and His Friend: A Story of Pennsylvania (1870)
- The Ballad of Abraham Lincoln (1870)
- Faust: A Tragedy Translated in the Original Metres (1870–1871)
- Sights in and around Yedo (1871)
- Northern Travel (1871)
- Beauty and the Beast: And Tales of Home (1872)
- Japan in Our Day (1872)
- The Masque of the Gods (1872)
- The Heart of Arabia (1872)
- Travels in South Africa (1872)
- At Home and Abroad: A Sketch-Book of Life, Scenery and Men (1872)
- Diversions of the Echo Club (1873)
- Lars: A Pastoral of Norway (1873)
- Wonders of the Yellowstone – The Illustrated Library of Travel, Exploration and Adventure (with James Richardson) (1873)
- Northern Travel: Summer and Winter Pictures – Sweden, Denmark and Lapland (1873)
- Lake Regions of Central Africa (1873)
- The Prophet: A Tragedy (1874)
- Home Pastorals, Ballads & Lyrics (1875)
- Egypt And Iceland In The Year 1874 (1875)
- Boys of Other Countries: Stories for American Boys (1876)
- Echo Club and Other Literary Diversions (1876)
- Picturesque Europe Part Thirty-Six (1877)
- The National Ode: The Memorial Freedom Poem (1877)
- Bismarck: His Authentic Biography (1877)
- Assyrian Night-Song (August 1877)
- Prince Deukalion (1878)
- Picturesque Europe (1878)
- Studies in German Literature (1879)
- Travels in Arabia (1892)
- A School History of Germany (1882)

=== Editions ===
Collected editions of his Poetical Works and his Dramatic Works were published at Boston in 1888; his Life and Letters (Boston, 2 vols., 1884) were edited by his wife and Horace Scudder.

Marie Hansen Taylor translated into German Bayard's Greece (Leipzig, 1858), Hannah Thurston (Hamburg, 1863), Story of Kennett (Gotha, 1868), Tales of Home (Berlin, 1879), Studies in German Literature (Leipzig, 1880), and notes to Faust, both parts (Leipzig, 1881). After her husband's death, she edited, with notes, his Dramatic Works (1880), and in the same year his Poems in a "Household Edition", and brought together his Critical Essays and Literary Notes. In 1885 she prepared a school edition of Lars, with notes and a sketch of its author's life.

== Notes ==
Diplomatic posts
Preceded by Bancroft Davis	United States Envoy to Prussia; May 7, 1878 – December 19, 1878	Succeeded by Andrew D. White
