= 58th Virginia Infantry Regiment =

- Flag of Virginia, 1861
- Active: October 1861 – April 1865
- Disbanded: April 1865
- Country: Confederacy
- Allegiance: Confederate States of America
- Branch: Confederate States Army
- Type: Infantry
- Engagements: American Civil War: Jackson's Valley Campaign; Seven Days' Battles; Second Battle of Bull Run; Battle of Antietam; Battle of Fredericksburg; Battle of Chancellorsville; Overland Campaign; Valley Campaigns of 1864; Battle of Sayler's Creek; Appomattox Campaign

The 58th Virginia Infantry Regiment was an infantry regiment raised in Virginia for service in the Confederate States Army during the American Civil War. It fought mostly with the Army of Northern Virginia.

The 58th Virginia completed its organization in October 1861. Most of its members were raised in Bedford, Franklin, and Amherst counties. After participating in Jackson's Valley Campaign the unit was assigned to Early's, W.Smith's, Pegram's, and J.A. Walker's Brigade, Army of Northern Virginia.

It was involved in many conflicts from the Seven Days' Battles to Chancellorsville, then was sent to Staunton from Winchester with prisoners during the Battle of Gettysburg. Later it was active in the Bristoe, Mine Run, and The Wilderness campaigns, the battle at Cold Harbor, and Early's Shenandoah Valley operations. The 58th ended the war at Appomattox.

It reported 50 casualties at McDowell, 53 at Harrisonburg, 77 at Cross Keys and Port Republic, 54 at Gaines' Mill, 9 at Fredericksburg, and 28 at Chancellorsville. On April 9, 1865, it surrendered with 2 officers and 63 men of which 22 were armed.

The field officers were Colonels Francis H. Board, Edmund Goode, and Samuel H. Letcher; Lieutenant Colonels Stapleton Crutchfield and John G. Kasey; and Majors George E. Booker and Edward T. Walker.

== See also ==
- List of Virginia Civil War units
