= Bayard Taylor Memorial Library =

Public library in Kennett Square, Pennsylvania

Coordinates: 39.84713°N 75.70957°W

The Bayard Taylor Memorial Library (Now Kennett Library) located in Kennett Square, Pennsylvania and is part of the Chester County Library System. The library was dedicated on Sept. 24, 1896, named in honor of Bayard Taylor, and opened to the public on Sept. 28 with a few periodicals and empty shelves.
