= Biddle =

Biddle may refer to:

== People ==
- Biddle (surname)
- Biddle family, American family

== Places ==
- Biddle, Montana, United States, a census-designated place
- Biddle Island (Indiana), United States
- Biddle Street, Baltimore, Maryland, United States
- Biddle Street, Yatton, biological site in England

== Other uses ==
- Biddle Motor Car Company, brass era automobile company based in Philadelphia
- USS Biddle, several United States Navy ships
- Biddle University, historical name of Johnson C. Smith University
- Biddle Memorial Hall, Johnson C. Smith University, Charlotte, North Carolina

== See also ==
- Biddle House (disambiguation)
