= Biddle (surname) =

Biddle is a surname. Notable people with the surname include:

== Philadelphia family ==
- Alexander Biddle (1819–1899), American businessman
- Algernon Sydney Biddle (1847–1891), American lawyer and law professor at the University of Pennsylvania Law School
- Anthony Joseph Drexel Biddle Sr. (1874–1948), Philadelphia millionaire
- Anthony Joseph Drexel Biddle Jr. (1897–1961), Soldier and diplomat
- Charles Biddle (1745–1821), vice-president of Pennsylvania
- Charles John Biddle (1819–1873), American congressman and editor
- Clement Biddle (1740–1814), American Revolutionary War soldier and quartermaster general
- Edward Biddle (1738–1779), American lawyer and statesman
- Francis Biddle (1886–1968), US Attorney General and judge in Nuremberg trials
- George Biddle (1885–1973), American artist
- James Biddle (1783–1848), American naval officer
- Jesse Biddle (born 1991), American professional baseball player from Philadelphia
- John Biddle (Michigan politician) (1792–1859), American politician and congressman
- John Biddle (United States Army officer) (1859–1936), American army general and acting U.S. Army Chief of Staff
- John Biddle (yachting cinematographer) (1925–2008), America's Cup Hall of Fame cinematographer and lecturer
- Livingston L. Biddle Jr. (1918–2002), American third chairman of National Endowment for the Arts
- Nicholas Biddle (1786–1844), American financier
- Nicholas Biddle (naval officer) (1750–1778), American naval officer
- Peter Biddle (born 1966), American Microsoft engineer
- Richard Biddle (1796–1847), American author and politician
- Sydney Biddle Barrows (born 1952), American escort agency owner and autobiographer
- Thomas Biddle (1790–1831), War of 1812 American hero killed in a duel with a congressman
- William P. Biddle (1853–1923), 11th Commandant of United States Marine Corps

== Others ==
- Adrian Biddle (1952–2005), English cinematographer
- Charles J. Biddle (aviator) (1890–1972), American World War I fighter pilot
- Dick Biddle (1947–2023), American football player and coach
- Ellen Biddle Shipman (1869–1950), American landscape architect
- George Biddle (politician) (1836–1909), American politician from Maryland
- Hester Biddle (c. 1629–1697), English Quaker writer and preacher
- James Biddle Eustis (1834–1884), American politician from Louisiana
- John Biddle (Unitarian) (1615–1662), English Unitarian
- Joseph Franklin Biddle (1871–1936), American politician from Pennsylvania
- Mary Duke Biddle (1887–1960), American philanthropist
- Melvin E. Biddle (1923–2010), American World War II Medal of Honor recipient
- Owen Biddle (musician) (born 1977), American bass guitarist and songwriter with The Roots
- Stephen Biddle (born 1959), American foreign policy scholar
- Taye Biddle (born 1983), American football player
- William W. Biddle (1900–1973), American psychologist
