= Owen Biddle =

Owen Biddle may refer to:

- Owen Biddle (musician) (born 1977), American bass guitarist, record producer and songwriter
- Owen Biddle Sr. (1737–1799), American clockmaker and watchmaker
- Owen Biddle Jr. (1774–1806), American carpenter and builder
