= Biddle family =

Prominent Philadelphian family

Biddle
- Political family
- Current region: Philadelphia, Pennsylvania, U.S.
- Origin: England
- Connected families: Cadwalader family Boßler family Duke family Drexel family
- Motto: Deus clypeus meus (Latin for 'God is my shield')
- Estates: Kinkora, New Jersey; Andalusia; Biddle House, Mackinac Island; 715 Spruce Street, Philadelphia (Nicholas Biddle House); Benjamin N. Duke House; Linden Court, Tarrytown, New York; Mary Duke Biddle Estate; Villa El Sarmiento, Palm Beach; Laurento, Wayne, Pennsylvania; Melmar, Bryn Athyn, Pennsylvania; Binderton, Chestnut Hill, Philadelphia; Biddle House, Dickinson College; Biddle Mansion, Riverton, New Jersey

The Biddle family of Philadelphia, Pennsylvania is an Old Philadelphian family descended from English immigrants William Biddle (1630–1712) and Sarah Kempe (1634–1709), who arrived in the Province of New Jersey in 1681. Quakers, they had emigrated from England in part to escape religious persecution. Having acquired extensive rights to more than 43,000 acres (170 km^{2}) of lands in West Jersey, they settled first at Burlington, a city which developed along the east side of the Delaware River.

William Biddle, 3rd (1698–1756), and John Biddle (1707–1789), two third-generation brothers, moved from Mount Hope (now Kinkora, near Bordentown, also on the east side of the Delaware), to Philadelphia, Pennsylvania in the 1720s and 1730s. They constituted the first generation of the Philadelphia Biddle family, which became involved in the business, political and cultural life of Pennsylvania and the United States.

== Family members ==
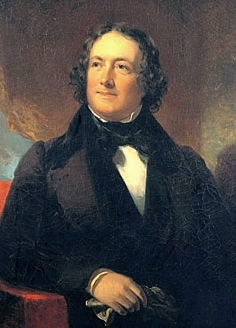
Nicholas Biddle (1786-1884), a prominent financier and politician who served as the final president of the Second Bank of the United States

=== Branch of William Biddle, 3rd (1698–1756) and Mary Scull (1709–1789) ===
- William Biddle, 3rd (1698–1756) and Mary Scull (1709–1790)
  - James Biddle (1731–1797), prothonotary of Philadelphia courts, married Frances Marks
    - Marks John Biddle (1765–1849), married Jane Dundas, niece of Major-General Ralph Dundas and first cousin of Lieutenant-General Sir Ralph Abercromby (ancestor of the Barons Abercromby), General Sir Robert Abercromby, and Lord Abercromby
  - Lydia Biddle (1734–1767), married William McFunn (?–1768), captain in the Royal Navy and Governor of the Island of Antigua, West Indies
    - William McFunn Biddle (1764–1809), married Lydia Spencer (1766–1858), daughter of Elihu Spencer, niece of John Berrien and sister-in-law of Jonathan Dickinson Sergeant
      - Lydia Spencer Biddle (1797–1871), married Samuel Baird (1786–1833)
        - Spencer Fullerton Baird (1823–1887), first U.S. Commissioner of Fish and Fisheries and second secretary of the Smithsonian Institution, married Mary Helen Churchill (1846–?)
        - Mary Deborah Baird (1829–1900), endowed Biddle University, married distant cousin Henry Jonathan Biddle (1817–1862) who was a grandson of Clement Biddle
      - Valeria Fullerton Biddle, married her cousin Charles Bingham Penrose (1798–1857), Speaker of the Pennsylvania Senate, Solicitor of the United States Treasury, and Assistant Secretary of the Treasury (as below)
      - William McFunn Biddle, Jr., married Julian Montgomery
      - Mary Elizabeth Dagworthy Biddle (1805–1879), married Maj. George Blaney (1795–1835), captain with the U.S. Army Corps of Engineers
      - Edward Biddle, married Julia H. Watts
        - David W. Biddle
        - Lydia Spencer Biddle,
        - Charles Penrose Biddle
        - Frederick W. Biddle
        - Edward William Biddle (1852–1931), married Gertrude Dale Bosler
          - Herman Bosler Biddle (1883–1909)
          - Edward MacFunn Biddle (1886–1950) married 1) Anna Hope Dale and 2) Mary, Countess de Borchgrave d'Altena (née Robinson)
        - William McFunn Biddle
  - John "Jacky" Biddle (1736–?) married Sophia Boone
    - Edward Biddle, bought Biddle House on Mackinac Island
    - William Biddle married Abigail Johnson
      - Joseph Cadwalader Biddle (1805–1884) married Elizabeth Cook (died 1899)
        - William Biddle married Anna W.?
          - Frederick Davis Biddle married Estelle Warne Harbeson
            - Eric Harbeson Biddle (1898–1993), businessman and diplomat, assisted Franklin D. Roosevelt during the creation of the United Nations and the United Nations Establishment Commissions (married Katherine Rogers, the daughter of Colonel John I. Rogers).
              - Eric Harbeson Biddle Jr. (1928–2012), CIA Section Chief, later immigration lawyer
              - John "Jack" Biddle
              - Maurice R. Biddle (1932–1999), jazz composer and pianist, also advertising executive in Philadelphia and New York City
  - Edward Biddle (1738–1779), lawyer, soldier, delegate to the Continental Congress, married Elizabeth Ross (sister of George Ross)
  - Charles Biddle (1745–1821), politician and Vice President of the Supreme Council of the Commonwealth of Pennsylvania, married Hannah Shepard
    - James Biddle (1783–1848), US Navy Commodore
    - Nicholas Biddle (1786–1844), president of the Second Bank of the United States, married Jane Craig
      - Edward Biddle (1815–1873), married Jane Josephine Sarmiento
        - Edward Biddle III (1851–1933), married Emilie Taylor Drexel (1851–1883) daughter of Anthony Joseph Drexel
          - Anthony Joseph Drexel Biddle, Sr. (1874–1948), subject of novel (written by his daughter), which was adapted as the Broadway play and Disney motion picture The Happiest Millionaire
            - Anthony Joseph Drexel Biddle Jr. (1897–1961), U.S. ambassador to seven different countries, married Mary Duke (1887–1960), the sister of Angier Buchanan Duke
              - Mary Duke Biddle (1920–2012), heiress and philanthropist
              - Nicholas Duke Biddle (1921–2004)
            - Cordelia Drexel Biddle (1898–1984), married Angier Buchanan Duke (1884–1923), the brother of Mary Duke
              - Angier Biddle Duke (1915–1995), U.S. Ambassador to El Salvador 1952–1953, U.S. Ambassador to Spain 1965–1968, U.S. Ambassador to Morocco 1979–1981, member of the Council on Foreign Relations
              - Anthony Drexel Duke (1918–2014)
            - Livingston Ludlow Biddle (1899–1981) married Kate Raboteau Page (1903–?), daughter of Robert N. Page
              - Livingston Ludlow Biddle (1926–2009) married Elizabeth "Betsy" Elwell Collin in 1953
          - Livingston Ludlow Biddle (1877–1959), married Rosalie Eugenia Carter Law (1890–1980)
            - Livingston Ludlow Biddle Jr. (1918–2002), chairman National Endowment for the Arts
            - Ernest Law Biddle (1919–1970)
          - Edward Craig Biddle (1879–1947), tennis player, married firstly Laura Baker Whelen (1879–1925)
            - Craig Biddle Jr. (1902–1988)
            - George Drexel Biddle (1903–1952)
            - Laura May Biddle Stewart
          - Brigadier General Nicholas Biddle (1893–1977) of "Springfield" and "Melmar", married Sarah Wharton Lippincott (1894–1962), granddaughter of Joseph Wharton
      - Charles John Biddle (1819–1873), Civil War colonel and U.S. Congressman, married Emma Mather (1830–1918)
        - Charles Biddle (1857–1923) married Letitia Glenn
          - Charles John Biddle (1890–1972), World War I aviator and lawyer
        - Alexander Mercer Biddle (1865–?), married Marriet Fox (1867–?)
          - Sydney Biddle (1901–?), married Donald Byers Barrows (1898–1991)
            - Donald Byers Barrows Jr. (1926–2019), married Jeannette Ballantine (1930–2011)
              - Sydney Biddle Barrows (born January 14, 1952), New York City madam and author, known as the "Mayflower Madam"
    - Thomas Biddle (1790–1831), War of 1812 hero who died after a duel with a Missouri Congressman over a perceived insult to his brother Nicholas
    - John Biddle (1792–1859), Michigan politician, married Eliza Falconer Bradish
      - Magaretta Falconer Biddle (1825–1913), married General Andrew Porter (1820–1872)
      - William Shepard Biddle (1830–1901), married Susan Dayton Ogden
        - Eliza Bradish Biddle (1857–1938), married Rev. Gershom Mott Williams (1857–1923)
          - Cecil Hayward Williams (1886–1972), married Phyllis Hope Hason (1886–1973)
            - Everard Mott Williams (1915–1972), married Mary Phoebus Stansel (1915–1999)
              - Thomas Granville Williams
              - Nancy Reid Williams
              - Susan Mott Williams
              - Peter Biddle Williams
        - John Biddle (1859–1936), Superintendent of the United States Military Academy
        - William Shepard Biddle II (1863–1938), married Margaret Alden Burrell
          - William Shepard Biddle III (1900–1981), Major General in World War II
    - Richard Biddle (1796–1847), U.S. Representative
  - Nicholas Biddle (1750–1778), Revolutionary War Navy captain

=== Branch of John Biddle (1707–1789) and Sarah Owen (1711–1773) ===
- John Biddle (1707–1789) and Sarah Owen (1711–1773)
  - Owen Biddle, Sr. (1737–1799), American Revolutionary War soldier, mathematician, astronomer, observed 1769 transit of Venus at Cape Henlopen, member of the American Philosophical Society, married Sarah Parke
    - John Biddle (1763–1815)
      - William Biddle (1806–1887), married Elizabeth Garrett (1806–1881)
        - Samuel Biddle (1844–1919), Bailey Banks & Biddle jewelry store
    - Owen Biddle Jr. (1774–1806), member of the Carpenters' Company of the City and County of Philadelphia, architect-builder, author "The Young Carpenters' Apprentice" (1805)
    - Clement Biddle (1778–1856), married Mary Canby (1780–1849)
      - Robert M. Biddle (1814–1902), married Anna Miller (1823–1891)
        - Henry Canby Biddle (1845–1886), married Anna Mary McIlvain (1850–1926)
          - Robert Ralston Biddle (1885–?), lent name to Biddle Motor Car Company
  - Clement Biddle (1740–1814), American Revolutionary War soldier, helped organize the "Quaker Blues" volunteers, deputy quartermaster general of the Pennsylvania and New Jersey militia, married Rebekah Cornell (born 1755) daughter of Gideon Cornell
    - Francis Biddle (1775–1775)
    - Thomas Alexander Biddle, Sr. (1776–1857), married Christine Williams (1780–1861)
      - Clement Biddle (1810–1879), prominent Philadelphia lawyer, served during the Civil War in Landis' Battery, Pennsylvania Militia Light Artillery.
      - Thomas Alexander Biddle Jr. (1814–1888), married Julia Cox (1819–1906). He was the senior partner of the firm of Thomas A. Biddle & Co., bankers and brokers, and a director of the Cumberland Valley Railroad Company, the Allentown Iron Company, the Equitable Life Insurance Company, and other corporations.
      - Henry Jonathan Biddle (1817–1862), married distant cousin Mary Deborah Baird (1829–1900), who endowed Biddle University. He served as a captain in the Union Army during the Civil War; he was mortally wounded during the battle of New Market Cross Roads
        - Jonathan Williams Biddle (1855–1877), served during the War with the Plains Indians. He was killed at Bear Paw Mountain, Montana when his regiment charged a camp of Nez Perce Indians.
        - Henry Jonathan Biddle (1862–1928), Oregon/Washington engineer, businessman, and philanthropist. In 1915 he bought the Columbia Gorge landmark Beacon Rock and developed a trail to its peak; his children Spencer and Rebecca donated it to Washington as a state park.
      - Alexander Williams Biddle Sr. (1819–1899), lieutenant colonel in the Union Army during the American Civil War, married Julia Williams Rush (1833–1898) granddaughter of Benjamin Rush
        - Alexander Williams Biddle Jr. (1856–1916), married Anne McKennan (1858–1934)
          - Julia Rush Biddle (1886–1978), married Thomas Charlton Henry (1887–1930), mother-in-law of Philip D. Armour Jr., ******Pauline Biddle (1880-1968, married John Penn Brock (1879-1928)
          - Alexander Biddle (1893–1973), married Margot Scull (1896–1972)
        - Henry Rush Biddle (1858–1877)
        - Julia Rush Biddle (1859–1885)
        - James Wilmer Biddle (1861–1927), married Cora Rowland (1861–1927)
        - Mariamne Biddle (1866–1917)
        - Lynford Biddle (1871–1941)
      - Jonathan Williams Biddle (1821–1856), married Emily Skinner Meigs (1824–1905)
        - Christine Biddle (1847–1900), married Richard McCall Cadwalader (1839–1918)
        - Charles Meigs Biddle (1849–1853)
        - Williams Biddle (1850–1852)
        - Mary Biddle (1851–1851)
        - Thomas Biddle (1853–1915)
        - Emily Williams Biddle (1855–1931)
    - George Washington Biddle (1779–1811)
    - Mary Biddle (1781–1850) married Thomas Cadwalader (1779–1841) son of General John Cadwalader
    - Rebekah Cornell Biddle (1782–1870), married Nathaniel Chapman (1780–1853)
    - Clement Cornell Biddle (1784–1855), married Mary Searle Barclay (1785–1872)
      - John Barclay Biddle (1815–1879), married Caroline Phillips (1821–1906)
        - William Phillips Biddle (1853–1923), 11th Commandant of the U.S. Marine Corps (1910–1914)
      - George Washington Biddle (1818–1897), married Maria Coxe McMurtrie (1818–1901)
        - George Washington Biddle Jr. (1843–1886), married Mary Hosack Rogers
        - Algernon Sydney Biddle (1847–1891) married Frances Robinson
          - Moncure Biddle (1882–1956), a banker
          - George Biddle (1885–1973), an artist
          - Francis Beverly Biddle (1886–1968), US Attorney General, and primary American judge during the Nuremberg trials
          - Sydney Geoffrey Biddle, M.D. (1889–1954), a psychoanalyst and founding member of the Psychoanalytic Center of Philadelphia
            - Oliver Cadwell Biddle, married to Katharine Mortimer (1923–2003)
              - Christine Mortimer Biddle, married to Thomas George Reeves in 1972.
        - Arthur Biddle (1852–1897)
      - Chapman Biddle (1822–1880), Civil War colonel
    - Anne Biddle (1785–1786)
    - Lydia H. Biddle (1787–1826)
    - Sarah T. Biddle (1789–1790)
    - Anne Wilkinson Biddle (1791–?), married Thomas Dunlap (1793–1864)
    - John Gideon Biddle (1793–1826), married his cousin Mary Biddle (?–1854)
    - James Cornell Biddle (1795–1838), married Sarah Caldwell Keppele (1789–1877) daughter of Michael Keppele (1771–1821)
      - Thomas Biddle (diplomat) (1827–1875), married Sarah Frederica White (1845–1870)
      - Caldwell Keppele Biddle (1829–1862)
      - Catherine Keppele Biddle (1831–1914), married William P. Tatham (1820–1899)
      - Rebecca Biddle (1833–1859)
      - James Cornell Biddle (1835–1898), married Gertrude Gouverneur Meredith (1839–1905). He served as an officer in the Union Army during the Civil War.
      - Cadwalader Biddle (1837–1906), founder of Union League of Philadelphia
  - Ann Biddle (1742–1807), married James Wilkinson (1757–1825)
    - John Wilkinson (1780–1796)
    - James Biddle Wilkinson (c. 1783–1813)
    - Joseph Biddle Wilkinson (1789–1865), married to Catherine Andrews (1785–1861)
      - Joseph Biddle Wilkinson Jr. (1817–1902), married to Josephine Osborne Stark (1823–1908)
        - Joseph Biddle Wilkinson III (1845–1915), married to Lydia Duval (d. 1937)
        - Theodore Stark Wilkinson (1847–1921), a U.S. Representative from Louisiana.
          - Theodore Stark Wilkinson (1888–1946), a Vice-Admiral of the United States Navy during World War II
    - Walter Wilkinson (1791–1837), married to Emilia Louise Valle (1793–1849)
  - Sarah Biddle (1748-1794), married 1) James Penrose 2) John Shaw and 3) Rudolph Tillier (of the Bernese patrician family Tillier)
    - Clement Biddle Penrose (1771-1829), Land Commissioner for the Louisiana Territory and namesake of Penrose, St. Louis, married to Anna Howard Bingham (c. 1778-?)
      - Charles Bingham Penrose (1798-1857), married his cousin Valeria Fullerton Biddle (1799-1881), as above

== List of financial holdings ==
The following is a list of businesses in which members of the Biddle family have held a controlling or otherwise significant interest.

- American Tobacco
- Bailey Banks & Biddle
- Biddle Motor Car Company
- Biddle, Townsend and Company
- Cumberland Valley Railroad
- Drexel-Biddle & Bradley Publishing House
- Drinker, Biddle & Reath
- Joseph F. Biddle Publishing Company
- Detroit & St. Joseph Railroad
- Philadelphia Age
- Philadelphia Savings Fund Society
- The Port Folio
- St. Regis New York
- Thomas A. Biddle & Company

== See also ==
- Biddle House (Mackinac Island)
- List of United States political families
