= Alexander Biddle =

American businessman and army officer (1819-1899)

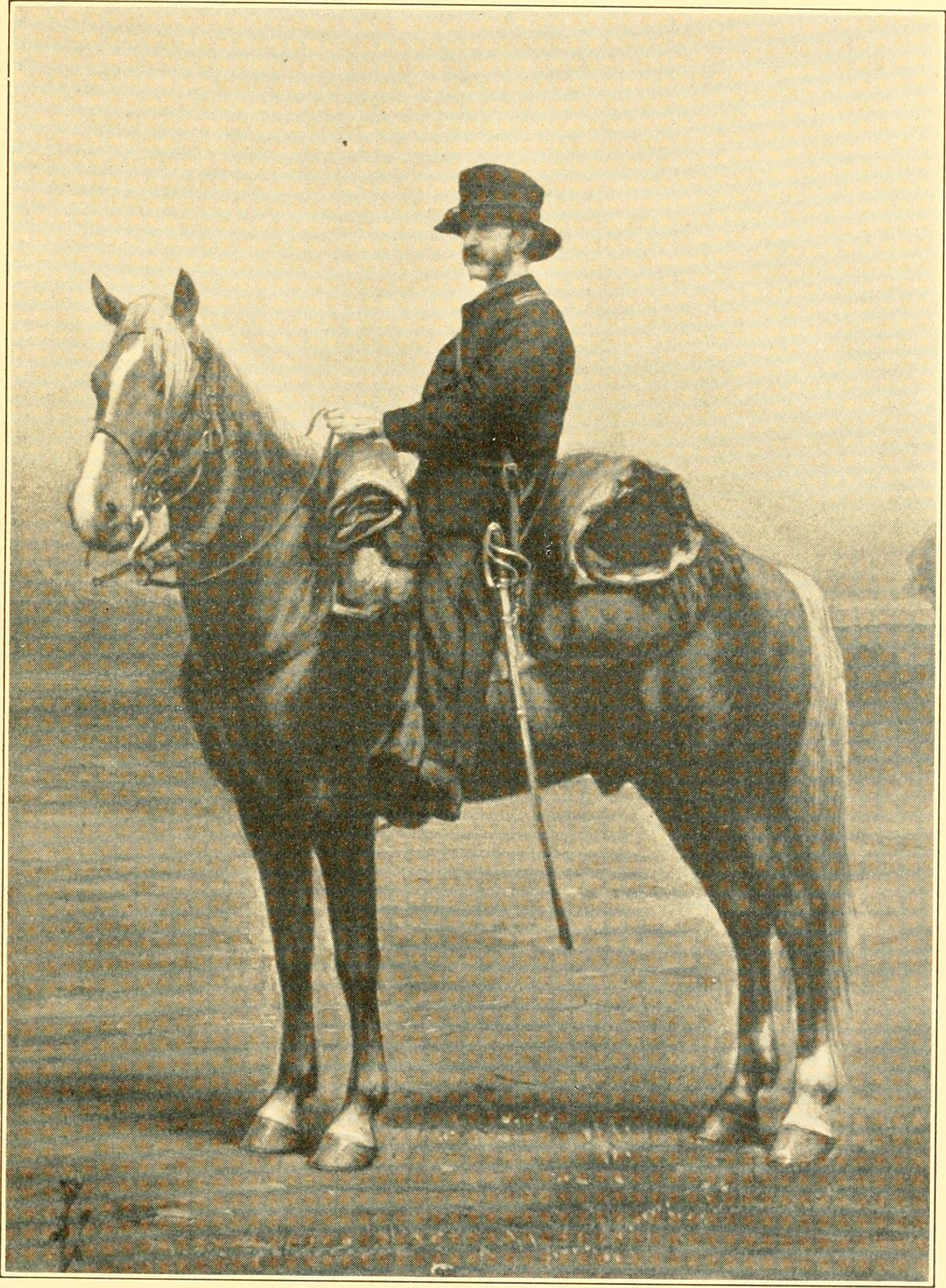
- Colonel Alexander Biddle
- Born: April 29, 1819; Philadelphia, Pennsylvania, U.S.
- Died: May 2, 1899 (aged 80); Philadelphia, Pennsylvania, U.S.
- Burial place: Laurel Hill Cemetery, Philadelphia, Pennsylvania, U.S.
- Relatives: Clement Biddle (grandfather)
- Military career
- Allegiance: United States
- Branch: Union army
- Conflicts: American Civil War; Battle of Fredericksburg; Battle of Chancellorsville; Battle of Gettysburg; Battle of Bristoe Station

Alexander Williams Biddle (April 29, 1819 – May 2, 1899) was an American businessman from Pennsylvania. He was a member of the prominent and wealthy Biddle family and the grandson of American Revolutionary War soldier Clement Biddle. He served as an officer in the Union Army during the American Civil War and fought in some of the key battles of the war.

== Early life and education ==
Biddle was born on April 29, 1819, in Philadelphia, Pennsylvania, to Thomas A. and Christine Williams Biddle.

He received his early education from the school of Sears C. Walker in Philadelphia. He entered the University of Pennsylvania in 1834 and graduated in 1838. After graduation, he worked for the Bevan and Humphreys shipping firm in Philadelphia until 1842. In 1848, he joined his father's company, Thomas Biddle & Co., where he worked until the beginning of the Civil War.

== Civil war ==
In 1849, he joined the first troop of the Philadelphia City Cavalry, in which he served until 1858.

On September 1, 1862, he joined the 121st Pennsylvania Volunteer Infantry and served under his cousin, Chapman Biddle. He served successively as a major, lieutenant colonel, and colonel. He fought at the Battle of Fredericksburg, the Battle of Chancellorsville, the Battle of Gettysburg (under Abner Doubleday) and the Battle of Bristoe Station.

His name is inscribed on the 121st Pennsylvania's monument along South Reynolds Avenue in the Gettysburg National Military Park.

== Business career ==
After the war, he retired from Thomas Biddle & Company, and in 1874, he was named a director of the Pennsylvania Railroad. He also served as a director for the Philadelphia Savings Fund Company, the Pennsylvania Company for Insurance on Lives and Granting Annuities, the Lehigh Navigation Company, and the Contributionship Insurance Company. He served as president of the Board of City Trusts and as a member of the board of managers of the Pennsylvania Hospital. He was an executor of the estate of James Rush (1786–1869) and was instrumental in the construction of the Ridgway Library (part of the Library Company of Philadelphia).

== Personal life ==
In 1855, he married Julia Williams Rush, the granddaughter of Benjamin Rush, and together they had seven children.

He was a member of the American Philosophical Society, the Franklin Institute, the Academy of Natural Sciences, and the Pennsylvania Society of Sons of the Revolution.

He died on May 2, 1899, in Philadelphia and was interred at Laurel Hill Cemetery.

== See also ==
- Biddle family
