= William Biddle =

William Biddle may refer to:

- William P. Biddle (1853–1923), 11th Commandant of the United States Marine Corps
- William W. Biddle (1900–1973), American psychologist, major contributor to the study of propaganda
- William Biddle Shepard (1799–1852), congressional representative from North Carolina
- USS William P. Biddle, a Heywood-class attack transport
