= Beacon Rock State Park =

State park in the U.S. state of Washington

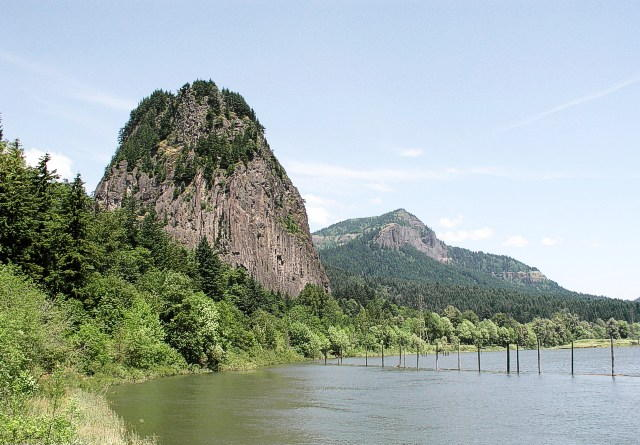
- Beacon Rock viewed from the west

- Location within Washington (state) Location within the United States
- Location: Skamania County, Washington, United States
- Coordinates: 45°37′39″N 122°01′14″W
- Area: 4,464 acres (1,807 ha)
- Elevation: 722 ft (220 m)
- Established: 1935
- Administrator: Washington State Parks and Recreation Commission
- Visitors: 594,948 (in 2024)
- Website: Official website

Beacon Rock State Park is a geologic preserve and public recreation area on Route 14 in the Columbia River Gorge National Scenic Area in Skamania County, Washington, United States. The park takes its name from Beacon Rock, an 848-foot (258 m) basalt volcanic plug on the north shore of the Columbia River 32 miles (51 km) east of Vancouver. On October 31, 1805, the Lewis and Clark Expedition arrived here and first measured tides on the river, indicating that they were nearing the ocean.

== Beacon Rock ==
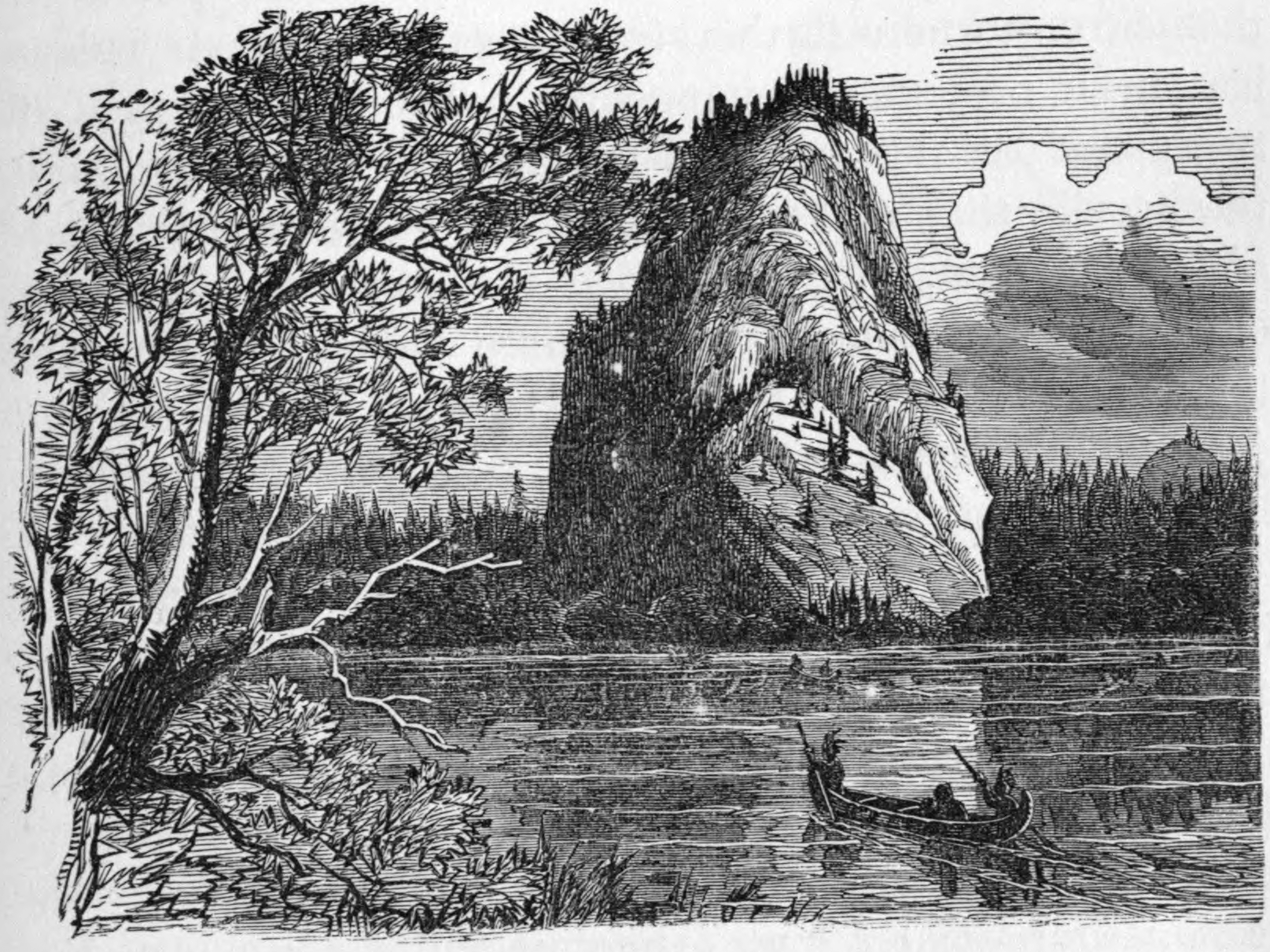
"Castle Rock" in a lithograph from Frances Fuller Victor's Eleven years in the Rocky Mountains and a life on the frontier (1877).

Beacon Rock is an 848-foot-tall (258 m) monolith composed of basalt on the north bank of the Columbia River. It was named by Lewis and Clark in 1805; they originally referred to it as Beaten Rock, later as Beacon Rock. They noted that the rock marked the eastern extent of the tidal influence in the Columbia. The rock was later known as Castle Rock, until 1915 when its name was changed back to Beacon Rock.

Henry J. Biddle purchased the rock in 1915 for $1 and during the next three years constructed a trail with 51 switchbacks, handrails and bridges. The three-quarter mile trail to the top, completed in April 1918, leads to views in all directions.

The United States Army Corps of Engineers planned to destroy the rock to supply material for the jetty at the mouth of the Columbia (see Columbia River Bar), and dug three caves on the rock's south side. During this time, Biddle's family tried to make it a state park. At first Washington refused the gift, but changed its position when Oregon offered to accept. The park was established in 1935. Workers with the Civilian Conservation Corps made improvements which remain in use.

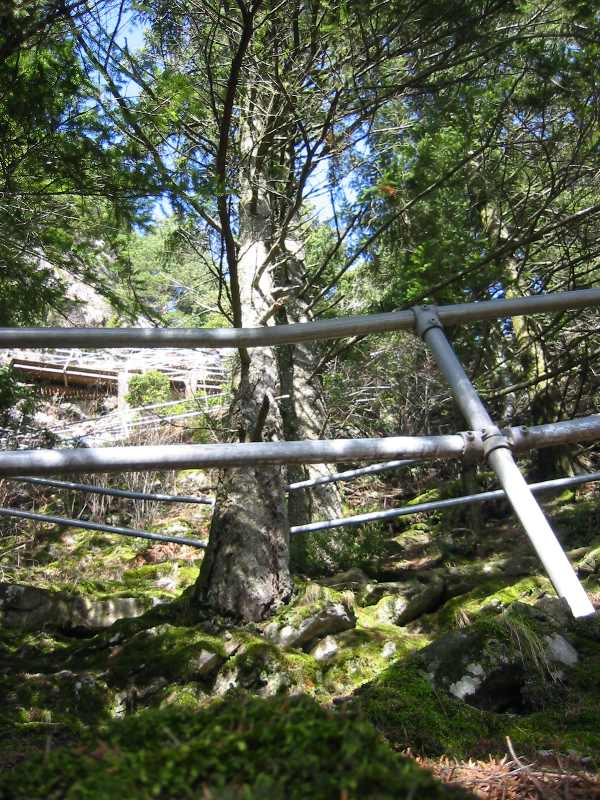
Railings of the switchback trail ascending Beacon Rock

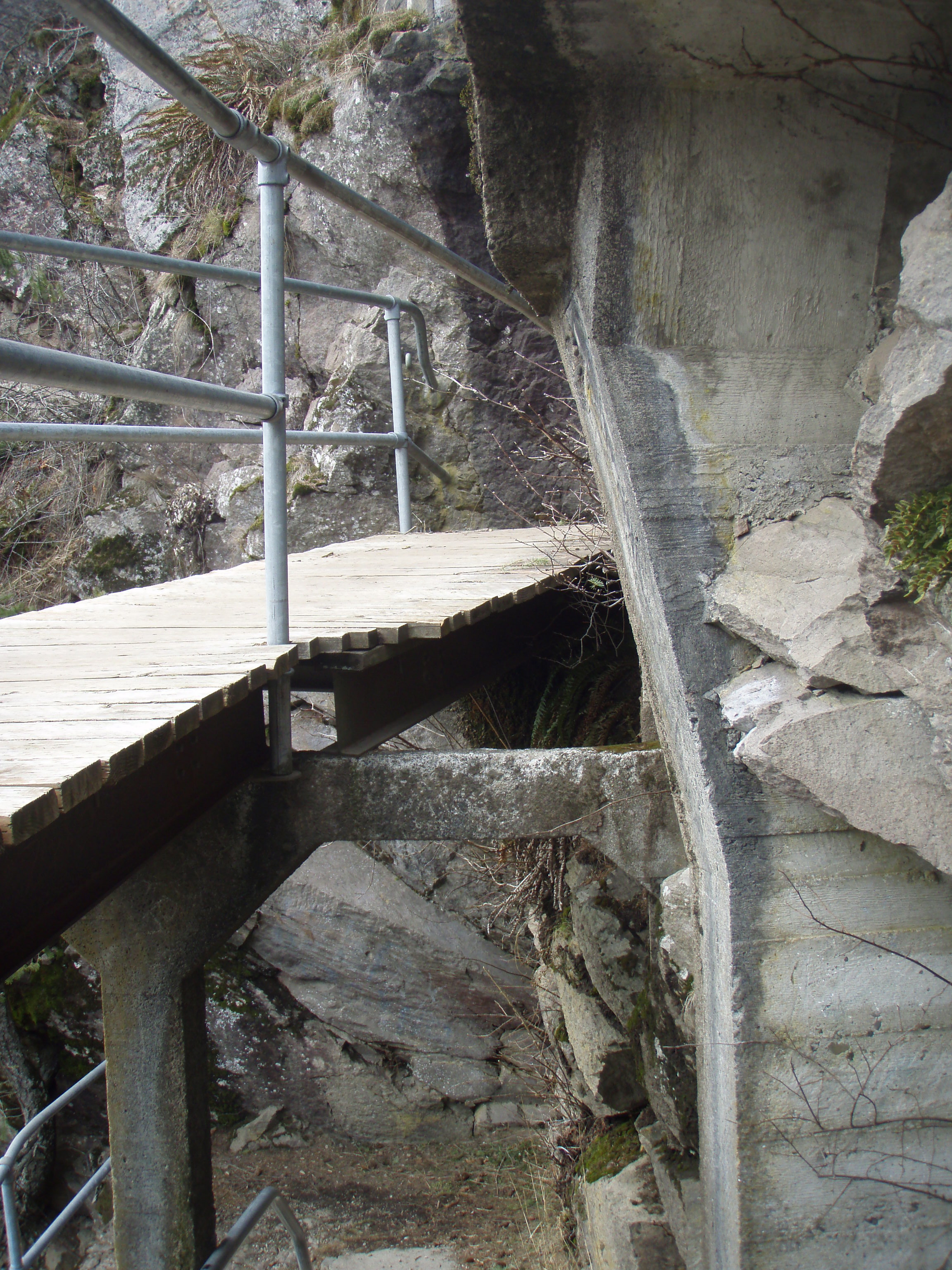
Another view of the interlocking walkways

=== Claims ===
Beacon Rock has been variously claimed to be the second largest free standing monolith in the northern hemisphere, or in the world, just behind the Rock of Gibraltar, Stone Mountain, or Mount Augustus, the latter two being very much larger than either of the first two. The assertion depends on how one defines the term "monolith." For example, Devils Tower National Monument in Wyoming is larger than Beacon Rock, but is considered an igneous intrusion rather than necessarily a "single rock."

== Activities and amenities ==
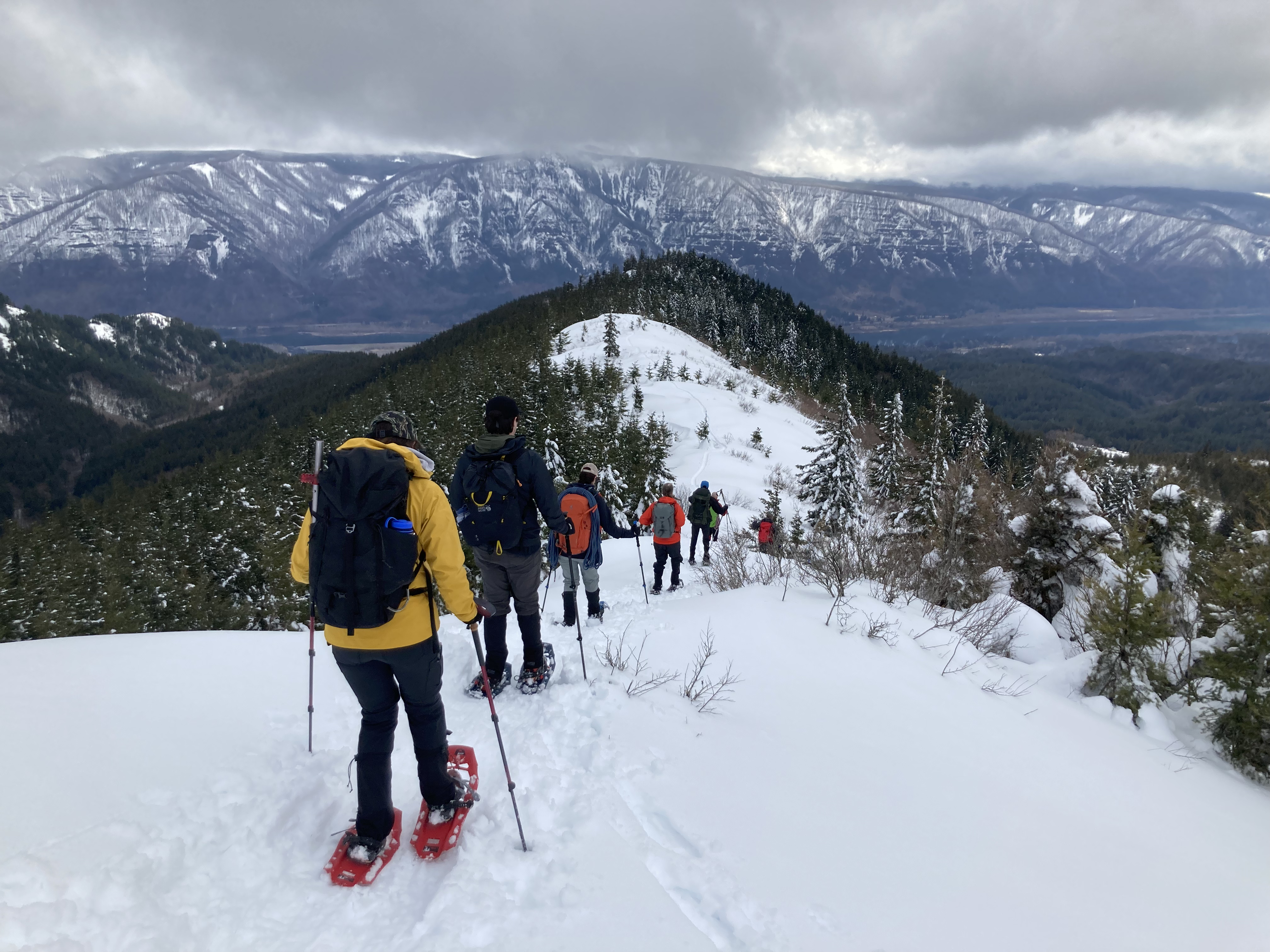
A Mazamas class snowshoes on Hardy Ridge

Beacon Rock is known for quality, challenging, technical rock climbing. The park's 4,464 acres (1,807 ha) include 9,500 feet (2,900 m) of Columbia River shoreline and forested uplands with 20 miles (32 km) of hiking, mountain biking, and equestrian trails. The park has boating and camping facilities. Trails go to the top of Beacon Rock and Little Beacon Rock. Hardy Falls and Rodney Falls (Pool of the Winds) are scenic highlights along the trail to the summit of 2,445-foot (745 m) Hamilton Mountain, which has a view of Bonneville Dam and points east. Hamilton Mountain Saddle, located north of the summit, provides additional views, including Table Mountain, and the opportunity for a 7.75 miles (12.47 km) loop hike.

== Sources ==
- Mueller, Marge (2004). Washington State Parks: A Complete Recreation Guide (Third ed.). Seattle: The Mountaineers Books. p. 177. ISBN 0-89886-893-9.
