= Henry J. Biddle =

Henry Jonathan Biddle
- Born: 1862; Carlisle, Pennsylvania, US
- Died: 1928 (aged 65–66); Lakeview, Oregon, US
- Education: Yale University
- Occupations: Engineer, farmer, and naturalist
- Known for: Preservation of Beacon Rock
- Spouse: Helene Biddle
- Children: 2

Henry Jonathan Biddle (1862–1928) was a botanist, engineer, businessman and amateur sportsman of southwest Washington as well as Portland, Oregon in the early 20th century. He owned about 360 acres of real estate in and around Vancouver, Washington.

== Early life ==
Biddle was born in 1862 at Carlisle, Pennsylvania. His parents were Major Henry J. Biddle and Mary Deborah Baird Biddle. Biddle was the youngest of five children. His family was prominent in the banking business and had a history of military service. At the time of his birth, his father was serving in the Union Army and was killed in the Battle of New Market the same year young Biddle was born. He attended Sheffield School and the Yale University. Later, he earned a degree in geology from the Kaiserlich Bergakademie in Freiburg, Germany.

In the 1880s he worked for the Smithsonian and then the United States Geological Survey in the eastern United States. Eventually, Biddle moved to the Pacific Northwest, settling first in Lakeview, Oregon and then in Portland before buying a farm near Vancouver, Washington.

== Later life ==
He acquired Beacon Rock in order to preserve it from demolition, and built the trail to its peak; his children donated it, and nearby Hamilton Mountain, to the state after his death. Biddle Butte, also known as Mount Zion, in Skamania County is named for him, and as an early automobile enthusiast in the area he was known for driving to its summit, and for scouting the early automobile roads of the region.

He had two children, Rebecca Baird Biddle (1888-1950) and Spencer Biddle (1890-1961). Spencer enlisted in the Spruce Production Division in 1918. Rebecca married Erskine Wood, son of famed Oregon writer Charles Erskine Scott Wood.

Rebecca and Spencer deeded the property, along with Hamilton Mountain, to the State of Washington in 1935 with the stipulation that it must be a public park.

Henry died in 1928 on a hunting expedition with Spencer in southern Oregon near Lakeview. He was to be interred in Portland, Oregon. Following his death, his estate was valued at $670,000 (equivalent to $12,562,500 in 2025), the largest amount filed leading up to the time in Clark County, Washington. His wife Helene died the following year.

== See also ==
- Biddle family

== Errata ==
- Motorcycle summits https://www.newspapers.com/clip/84806381/motorcycle-beacon-rock/
- https://history.columbian.com/biddle/
