= Judith Newman =

American journalist and author

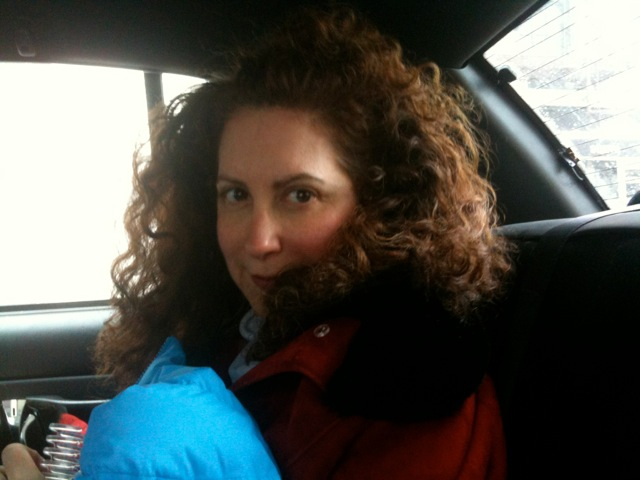
- Judith Newman in 2013
- Born: 1961 (age 64–65)
- Education: Columbia University; Wesleyan University
- Occupations: Journalist, author
- Writing career
- Language: English
- Notable works: You Make Me Feel Like an Unnatural Woman: The Diary of a New (Older) Mother; To Siri With Love

Judith B. Newman (born 1961) is an American journalist and author. She writes about entertainment, relationships, parenthood, business, beauty, books, science, and popular culture. Her work has appeared in more than fifty periodicals, including The New York Times, Vanity Fair, Harper's, The Wall Street Journal, Allure (where she served as Contributing Editor) and Vogue. Newman's books include the memoirs You Make Me Feel Like an Unnatural Woman: The Diary of a New (Older) Mother and To Siri With Love.

== Early life and education ==
Newman was raised in Scarsdale, New York. Her father, Edmund Newman, was a district sales manager for the Joseph Schlitz Brewing Company, and her mother, Frances (née Fiorillo; 1926–2011), was a physician. The actor Barry Newman (1930–2023), who played the title role on the 1970s television series Petrocelli, was Judith's uncle.

Newman graduated from Scarsdale High School in 1977 and received a bachelor's degree from Wesleyan University in Middletown, Connecticut, in 1981. She received a Master of Arts degree in English and Comparative Literature from Columbia University in 1984.

== Journalism career ==
Since the 1980s, Newman has written for magazines, newspapers and periodicals. Her articles include: "At Your Disposal – The Funeral Industry Prepares for Boom Times" (Harper's, 1997), "I Have Seen Cancers Disappear" (Discover, 2001), "Chasing Britney" (Allure, 2007), "How the Kardashians Made $65 Million Last Year" (The Hollywood Reporter, 2011) and "Making Waves with No Apology" (The New York Times, 2011).

Newman has been described as "one of the most successful freelance journalists today". Her article "I Have Seen Cancers Disappear" was selected for inclusion in The Best American Science and Nature Writing. On the other hand, Newman's writing has found critics: a review in Jezebel of her article "Chasing Britney" commented that she squandered "an opportunity to question the common wisdom that it is Britney [Spears] who is insane, not those around her."

Newman has written a regular column for Ladies Home Journal ("My Life as a Mom") and has written sex columns for Mademoiselle and American Health. She wrote a relationship column for the defunct teen girls' magazine YM, and an etiquette column ("Manner Up") for Parade. Newman contributes book reviews to People and The New York Times Book Review. Times Book Review editor Pamela Paul said, "Judith Newman could review a potato peel and it would be wry, insightful, and entertaining."

Newman's approach to narrative and criticism has occasionally irritated some of the prominent people about whom she writes. In response to a Vanity Fair story about the downfall of Rosie O'Donnell's Rosie magazine, O'Donnell, from the witness stand during a trial, stated that Newman was like "the nebbishy Jewish girl who worked for the audiovisual club in high school." Publisher Judith Regan criticized Newman following the publication of Newman's 2005 Vanity Fair story "The Devil and Miss Regan". The Daily Telegraph wrote: "Regan would happily knock the teeth out of Judith Newman."

In January 2014, Newman's essay "Wikipedia, What Does Judith Newman Have to Do to Get a Page?" appeared in The New York Times. In the essay, Newman questioned Wikipedia's editorial policies, including its criteria for selecting and deleting articles, and requested that Wikipedia editors help with creating an article about her. That same day, a Wikipedia article was written on Newman, who chronicled her "Wiki-Validation" in a second New York Times column a week later: "Wikipedia may be a haven for cranks and pedants, but it is also amazing," Newman wrote. "Why some guy named SSSilvers [sic], who describes his interests as 'light opera, musical theater and global warming,' would take hours out of his day to noodle with a stranger's page is mysterious, and yet touching."

== Books ==
In 1993, Newman wrote Bath (Chic Simple), and the following year she wrote Body (Chic Simple), both for the Chic Simple Components series. In 1994, she also authored Tell Me Another One: A Woman's Guide to Men's Classic Lines, which focuses on male pick-up lines. The idea for the book came to Newman after she was jilted. The next year, Newman wrote Parents from Hell: Unexpurgated Tales of Good Intentions Gone Awry.

In 1996, Newman co-wrote Just Between Us Girls: Secrets About Men from the Madam Who Knows with "Mayflower Madam" Sydney Biddle Barrows. In 2013, she collaborated with Samantha Geimer on The Girl: A Life in the Shadow of Roman Polanski. A reviewer in The Guardian wrote, "[The Girl] might be the most important and invaluable book of the century so far ... an emotional rollercoaster ... smart and articulate".

Newman's memoir, You Make Me Feel Like An Unnatural Woman: Diary of a New (Older) Mother, was published in 2004. It details the challenges of getting pregnant at the age of 40, after "seven years of science," $70,000, and nine months of nausea. A Publishers Weekly review noted: "While humorless and/or politically correct readers may bristle at Newman's antics, everyone else will be rolling in the aisles, reading out funny parts to perfect strangers."

In 2017, HarperCollins released Newman's To Siri with Love, a collection of stories about life with her autistic son, Gus. The book was inspired by her 2014 New York Times essay of the same name. To Siri With Love was a New York Times notable book of 2017 and was positively reviewed by the Washington Post, in which it is called "Newman's love letter to her son". Newman's statement in the book that she intended to gain medical power of attorney over her son to involuntarily sterilize him, and other disclosures that members of the autism community felt were an invasion of her son's privacy, led to them calling for a boycott of the book.

== Personal life ==
Newman lives in New York City. She has twin sons born in 2001. Newman and her husband, opera singer John Snowdon, maintained separate apartments in Manhattan for the duration of their 25-year marriage. He died in June 2018.
