= 121st Pennsylvania Infantry Regiment =

Union Army infantry regiment

121st Pennsylvania Infantry
- Pennsylvania flag
- Active: September 1862 to June 2, 1865
- Country: United States
- Allegiance: Union
- Branch: Infantry

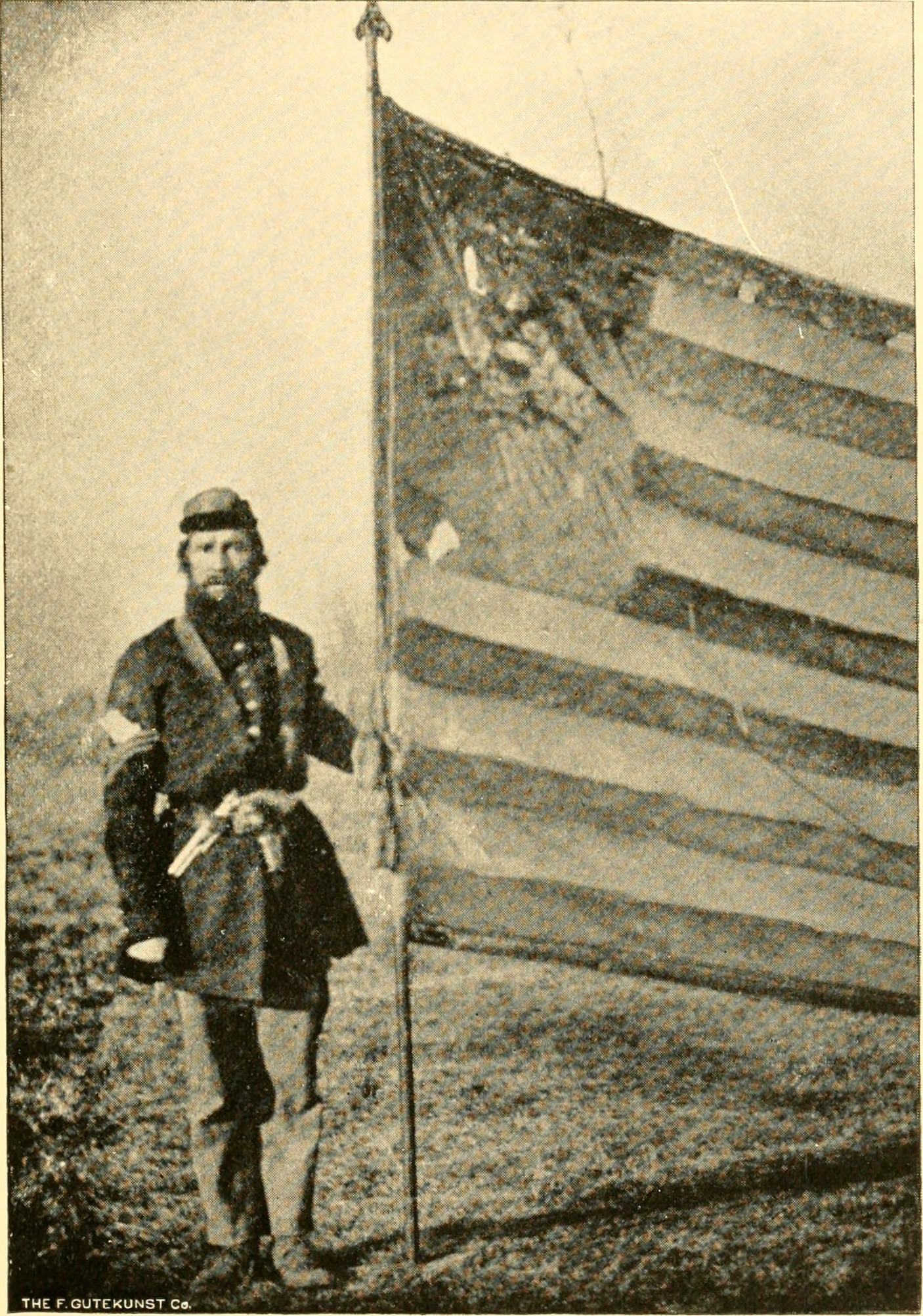
Color-sergeant William Hardy and Regimental Colors

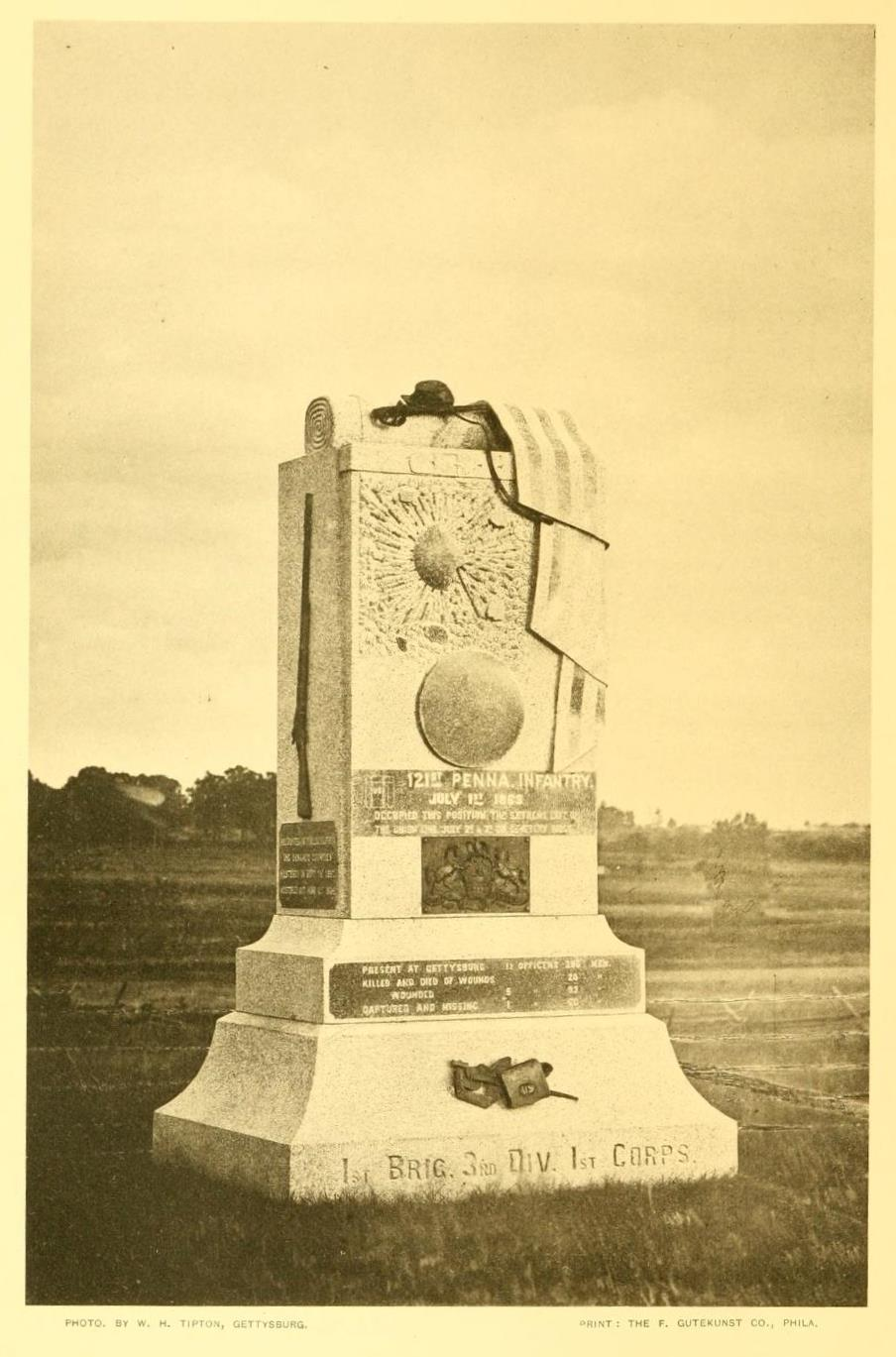
The 121st Pennsylvania Infantry Monument, Gettysburg Battlefield.

The 121st Regiment Pennsylvania Volunteer Infantry was a regiment of the Union Army during the United States Civil War.

== History ==
This regiment, chiefly recruited in the city of Philadelphia, and in the county of Venango, was organized at camp of rendezvous, near Chestnut Hill, Philadelphia, early in September 1862, with the following field officers:

- Chapman Biddle, of Philadelphia, colonel;
- Elisha W. Davis, of Venango County, lieutenant colonel;
- Alexander Biddle, of Philadelphia, major;

Soon after its organization, it was ordered to Washington, D.C., and upon its arrival, went into camp at Arlington Heights. Arms and equipment were not delivered until some weeks after its arrival, but drill and instruction were immediately commenced, and prosecuted with vigor, the regiment becoming noted for good discipline at the drills and reviews of General Silas Casey's Provisional Brigade, to which it was then attached.

On October 1, 1862, the regiment moved to Frederick, Maryland, and a week later joined General George Meade's Division of Pennsylvania troops, above Sharpsburg, and near the battle ground of Antietam. With the exception of slight skirmishing, as the army moved south through Virginia, it had no experience in fighting until it entered upon the Fredericksburg campaign. After reaching Warrenton, where McClellan was replaced by Major General Ambrose Burnside, it passed through Fayetteville, Stafford Court House, Brooks' Station, and White Oak Church, encamping a short time at each place.

=== Fredericksburg Campaign ===
On December 12, it crossed the Rappahannock at Franklin's Crossing, below Fredericksburg, and moved to a position near Deep Run, where it bivouacked for the night in line of battle.

On the morning of the 13th, moving forward over the broken ground near the Run, it crossed the Bowling Green Road, and took position opposite a wooded hill on which the enemy lay in well provided breast-works. This movement was made under a fire of artillery from the left flank, which was kept up for more than an hour, by which the line was twice struck, and ten men disabled. it was at the same time exposed to a direct fire from the front, which was answered by Ransom's guns in the immediate front of the regiment. A rebel caisson that was at this juncture fortunately exploded, when, taking advantage of the favorable moment, the order was given to advance, and the division crossed the plain, four hundred yards wide, under fire from front and both flanks, drove the rebel skirmishers from a deep ditch which skirted the woods, ascended the slope of the hill, and broke the line of the enemy, which was distinctly marked by his dead. The line of battle of the division having been somewhat disordered by the inequalities of the ground over which it had passed, and the obstructions met, it was here partially re-formed, and the position held without further orders, under a hot fire from all directions. The impression prevailing that the troops were surrounded, the fire of the enemy coming from flanks and rear, in the absence of orders from either brigade or division chiefs, the troops retired to put themselves in communication with them; but finding that they were entirely unsupported, they took up a position facing the woods, still under fire, from which they were finally ordered to retire to the position occupied in the early morning.

During Sunday, the 14th, and Monday, the 15th, the position was retained, in the hope that the enemy might be tempted from his fastness on the wooded heights, to the open fields below; but finding no indications of a hostile movement on his part, the army was withdrawn, and the regiment retired to camping ground near White Oak Church.

A few weeks later it moved to Belle Plains, where it remained in huts and under canvas during the winter, performing the usual routine of picket duty and drill. The loss in the campaign was one hundred and eighty, chiefly sustained in the action at Fredericksburg, including two officers killed, Lieutenants George W. Brickley and M. W. C. Barclay, for lost to the service:one by wounds, and one from sickness.

Burnside's second campaign, which was entered upon on January 20, 1863, was cut short by impassable roads. The artillery could not be moved, and after four days of exposure to the chilling weather, the army returned to its encampments. In returning, the regiment was left behind to assist in extricating the artillery, and afterwards to explore its way through an unknown country back to camp. This and another fruitless expedition to Port Conway, which the rebels, from the southern shore of the Rappahannock, were suspected of visiting, were the only variations from the usual routine of camp duty experienced during the winter.

=== Chancellorsville Campaign ===
The spring campaign opened with the march of the army to Chancellorsville. The First and Fifth corps were at first moved to Franklin's Crossing, of the Rappahannock, where they remained in support of the Sixth Corps, which made the passage of the stream, while Hooker, with the remaining three corps, marched and crossed several miles above. After remaining here until the 30th, the Third Corps, and on the 2d of May the First Corps, also moved above, and crossing, re-joined the army at Chancellorsville. After the reverse of the Eleventh Corps, on the evening of 2 May, the First Corps was hurried away from the extreme left, where it had halted on its way to the front, to the right, to meet a triumphant foe. The regiment, although much worn by fatiguing duty, suffered but slight loss. When the army withdrew to the neighborhood of Falmouth, after the battle, the regiment was stationed near the banks of the Rappahannock, three miles in advance of its former camping ground.

=== Gettysburg campaign ===
On June 12, the regiment moved by steady, rapid marches to Centreville, reaching the town on the 16th. It moved then onto Broad Run, crossed the Potomac at Edwards' Ferry, passing through Middletown and arriving at Emmitsburg on the 29th. On the night of the 30th, the regiment formed the advance picket of the Third Division, Doubleday's, at a point about seven miles from Gettysburg, covering the ground from Marsh Creek to Middle Creek, the center of the line being near the Cross Roads at Ross White's house.

On the morning of July 1, the regiment marched at the head of the brigade, which also included the 142nd and 151st Pennsylvania regiments, and the 20th New York Volunteer Infantry Regiment, as well as a battery of artillery, all under command of Colonel Biddle, Lieutenant Colonel Alexander Biddle being in command of the regiment.

As the brigade approached Gettysburg, the noise of artillery was heard, and shells were seen bursting over some distant woods. Crossing the hills to the west of the town, it came upon Buford's Cavalry, which was engaging the enemy, and formed in a field facing to the westward, with a wood in front held by the enemy. Soon afterwards it moved to the north, and united with the left of the First Division, under General Wadsworth, arriving in time to meet an advance of the enemy through the woods to the west of the Theological Seminary. The position thus occupied, was held during most of the day, though frequently changing front as the enemy manifested a disposition to advance from the north or from the west. With his numerous batteries, the enemy kept up a vigorous shelling of the position, until he made his final assault at half past two in the afternoon, advancing from the north and the west in overpowering force.

To meet his attack from the west, a change of front was made, which brought the 121st on the extreme left of the line, having upon its right the 20th New York, then a battery, and upon the extreme right, the 142nd. The 151st Pennsylvania having been previously detached to support the Second Brigade, commanded by General Roy Stone, was posted near the pike, farther to the right, and just in rear of the Seminary, but was subsequently brought up and formed on the right of the 142nd. The enemy's line of battle extended far beyond the extreme left of the Union line, lapping around it, his fire completely enfilading the 121st regiment.

When the direct assault on the front of the brigade came, it was at first successfully resisted. His line was received with an effective fire, and wounded men of the brigade, who were left upon the field, afterwards reported that none but scattered troops ever passed over the position; but his forces swarming in upon the left, and completely outflanking the brigade, gave no chance for successful resistance. The ground was, however, held until the brigade battery was withdrawn in safety, when the fragment of the command remaining, retired to a barricade in the woods, to the rear of the Seminary. Clinging to this until a large portion of the troops engaged, and the artillery and ambulances had passed on through the town, the brigade withdrew to Cemetery Hill, and re-formed in rear of its crest. Receiving a fresh supply of cartridges, the regiment was held in readiness to repel an anticipated assault from General Ewell, who had come in from the north; but no assault came, the rebel troops seeming content with their successes, and the men bivouacked at night, feeling that though beaten and driven back from their position of the morning, they had successfully checked the enemy, in vastly superior numbers, until a new position could be taken, immeasurably better than the first, and until the army could come up in sufficient strength to successfully cope with its adversary. Out of seven officers and two hundred and fifty-six men who entered the engagement in the morning, they were left at night with two officers and eighty-two men. An aggregate of one hundred and seventy nine, either killed, wounded, or missing - upwards of sixty-five percent.

On the following day, the brigade occupied a position on the Taneytown Road, to the left of the Cemetery, and during the cannonade in the afternoon was much exposed, the enemy's shells, from opposite directions, frequently bursting in the same field. Early on the morning of the 3rd, it was moved into line of battle on the left center, the regiment occupying a position immediately in front of General Doubleday's headquarters. A barricade of rails was thrown up for its protection, in case it should be pressed by infantry, but in the fierce cannonade by the enemy in the afternoon, which preceded his last grand charge, this barricade was shattered and leveled with the dust. The men slept on their arms during the succeeding night, and on the two following days were employed in clearing the field and in burying the dead.

On the afternoon of the 5th, the enemy being in full retreat, it moved with the corps by the Emmitsburg Road, and crossing the mountains opposite Hagerstown, came up with the enemy, in position near Williamsport. His skirmishers were speedily driven in. Pausing before his entrenched line, until the forces could be brought into position, an advance was ordered; but the enemy had made good his escape across the Potomac, and his entrenchments were possessed with but the feeble opposition of a line of skirmishers.

Returning over the South Mountains to Berlin, the regiment crossed the Potomac, followed substantially the route of the previous year to Warrenton and Rappahannock Station, and thence, after the lapse of some weeks, through Brandy Station, and Culpeper, to a point near Raccoon Ford on the Rapidan, where it remained until Lee attempted to turn the right of the Union army, causing a retrograde movement.

The regiment, then moved via Paoli Mills to Kelly's Ford, where it was engaged in throwing up rifle-pits, and guarding the crossing, until it was ascertained that the rebel army had passed the stream above, when it marched at midnight, passing Warrenton Junction, Catlett's and Bristoe Stations, and arrived with the division up on the Centreville Heights, in time to prevent their occupation by Lee's advance, which had arrived in close proximity. As the rest of the army came up, the division moved out towards the Chantilly battle ground, and upon the abandonment of offensive operations by the enemy, and his consequent retirement, advanced again towards Haymarket and Thoroughfare Gap. At Haymarket, a force of the enemy, supposed to be Stuart's Cavalry, dismounted, attacked at night, and in the conflict the regiment received a volley in the darkness, but fortunately without loss. As the enemy continued to fall back, Meade advanced. At Catlett's Station, the One-Hundred and Twenty-first was detailed for special duty in defending the Cedar Run Bridge, and in guarding the depots of stock, provision, and hospital stores deposited there, which duty it continued to perform until the close of the Mine Run campaign, when the army retired to winter-quarters on the left bank of the Rapidan. The regiment was then ordered to Paoli Mills, and subsequently to Culpeper, where it went into camp, and finally to permanent quarters.

=== Winter 1863 ===
During the winter, the First Corps, which, since its great sacrifices at Gettysburg, had been composed of little more than skeleton regiments, was broken up, and distributed to other corps. By this change, the 121st became part of the Fifth Corps, and though increased in numbers by the addition of a full company, which had been on duty at headquarters, was never after able to bring more than two hundred men into the field, no facilities having been afforded for recruiting. Colonel Chapman Biddle was honorably discharged on December 10, 1863, and Lieutenant Colonel Alexander Biddle, on January 9, 1864. Thereupon, Thomas M. Hall, who had been promoted to major, in December 1863, was made lieutenant colonel. During the winter the regiment remained in camp a short distance from Culpeper, engaged in the usual routine of camp and picket duty.

=== Overland Campaign ===
At one o'clock on the morning of May 4, the regiment moved on the Wilderness campaign. On the following morning, having crossed the Rapidan at Germania Ford, it moved forward, and as it became evident that the enemy was in front, took position in a dense thicket, through which it was compelled to cut alleys before it could advance. At noon it came upon the enemy, and became hotly engage, holding its ground by hard fighting until four p.m. It was obliged to retire, after suffering heavy casualties, and was moved to the left to the support of the Second Corps.

Early on the morning of the 6th, in conjunction with the Second Corps, which was formed in three lines of battle, it moved forward under a galling fire from the enemy in front, and a raking flank fire from his batteries. The ground was fiercely contested, and the command was finally checked and forced to fall back. But renewing the attack, it soon regained the lost ground. The enemy was here heavily reinforced, and succeeded in pushing the Union column back to the Gordonsville Road, where temporary works had been hastily thrown up. Artillery could not be used on account of the nature of the ground, and the three lines with which the advance was made had been gradually molded into one.

At the Gordonsville Road, the brigade to which the 121st was attached, was posted in rear of, and supporting a portion of the Second Corps. Late in the afternoon the enemy, with a recklessness rarely witnessed, charged upon the works, and in face of the deadly volleys of the infantry, and the more terrible fire of the artillery, succeeded in carrying a part of the line on the left, and in planting two of his standards upon the defenses. At this juncture the brigade, with the 121st on the extreme right, which until this moment had been lying prostrate upon the ground a few yards in the rear, was ordered to advance, and springing forward, came down upon the victorious enemy with a steady and unflinching front, pouring upon him volley after volley, wrenching from him his dear bought advantage, and driving him in confusion to the woods beyond. With the exception of slight skirmishing, this ended the fighting for the day.

After refilling the cartridge boxes, the men rested during the night in the works, and on the morning of the 7th were led to the rear, where they remained until night-fall, and then commenced the march towards Spotsylvania Court House, the enemy in the Wilderness having taken to his works. All night long the march was continued, reaching Laurel Hill, on the morning of the 8th, relieving a portion of the First Division, of the Fifth Corps, which was engaging the enemy under a heavy cross-fire from batteries in position on an eminence to its left. Finding him too strongly posted to be driven out with the force at hand, the ground was held, and temporary works were thrown up. During the following day the command was occupied in keeping the enemy at bay, being subjected the while to an annoying fire from two of his pieces. On the 10th the command advanced, and engaged him in front of the works until late in the afternoon, when bayonets were fixed, and all preparations made for a charge. But before the advance was made, the order was countermanded, and during the 11th it lay in the works. The next night a second line in rear of the first was thrown up, and on the 12th the command again advanced in column, under a heavy cross-fire of artillery; but after a fierce struggle, in which many of the bravest fell, it was compelled to retire. In the action of the 10th, Captain William W. Dorr, in command of the regiment, was among the killed, At evening it was taken to the left, where it relieved a portion of the Sixth Corps, and lay during the night in line of battle.

On the morning of the 13th it returned to its former position, and towards mid-day resumed the march towards Spottsylvania Court House, getting into position on the enemy's front at daylight of the following morning. On the 18th it again advanced and threw up a line of works, which it occupied under continual artillery fire, with occasional sharp skirmishing, until the 21st. On that day it moved on to Guinea Station, where the regiment was deployed as skirmishers, and advanced two miles, capturing a number of prisoners, and routing a rebel battery. On the 23rd the command again met the enemy in force at Jericho Ford, and immediately engaged him, and with the assistance of the artillery, forced him to withdraw. In this affair the conduct of the brigade was warmly complimented by General Cutler, then in command of the division. On the 25th a movement was made to the left, and the regiment was thrown forward as skirmishers, acting a, such during the entire day, and losing ten in killed and wounded. Lieutenant and Adjutant John Iungerich was here mortally wounded, expiring a month later. On the 28th, the Pamunky River was crossed, a little in advance of the enemy, when works for the defense of the position were hastily thrown up, and on the 30th the command took position on the right of the Pennsylvania Reserves, which were hotly engaged.

On June 1, the regiment advanced on the Mechanicsville Road, near Bethesda Church, under a raking fire of artillery, suffering considerable loss, but driving the rebel skirmishers, and throwing up breast-works in the edge of the woods from. which they retreated. After dark a further advance was made through the woods, and to within a stone's throw of the rebel pickets, where entrenching was quietly but diligently prosecuted, and the morning light disclosed to the astonished rebels a strong line of works under their very noses. Their artillery was hurried away to safe positions, and for five days the brigade held the ground under a continuous fire of artillery and sharpshooters. On June 6 the brigade reached Cold Harbor, where it was transferred to the First Division, in command of General Chamberlain.

=== Siege of Petersburg ===
Entrenching, skirmishing, and hard marching was kept up until June 14, when it reached the James, and on the 16th crossed and took position in front of Petersburg. On the 18th it again advanced, and crossing the Norfolk Railroad, drove in the enemy's skirmishers, sustaining a heavy loss, but establishing a permanent line. This was held until the night of the 20th, when the troops were relieved by the Ninth Corps, and retired to the rear. On the night of the 21st the brigade advanced in line on the left, through a thick wood, and under the fire of the rebel skirmishers threw up a breast-work, and was here employed in constructing what was subsequently known as Fort Hell. As the formation was particularly exposed, much care had to be exercised in the early stages of the work, to elude the attention of the enemy. The fort was finished and occupied by two batteries of heavy artillery before the springing of the mine, which occurred on July 31, and sustained without damage, the heavy rebel fire which was then brought to bear upon it.

On August 18, the regiment moved with the corps for the destruction of the Weldon Railroad. and after crossing the Blackwater, was deployed as skirmishers, driving in the rebel skirmishers as it advanced. The road having been effectually destroyed for a long distance, the brigade retired to works thrown up along the line of the ruins. On the 21st the regiment occupied a position in line on the left, and about two hundred yards in rear of the extreme left of the Fourth Division, which was on that day hotly engaged. The enemy finally advanced in column, charging the works in front of the Fourth Division, and sweeping around its left, thinking to come in upon an unprotected rear, but suddenly encountered the brigade, prepared to receive them. Determined not to be foiled in their purpose, they fought obstinately for some time, returning the fire that was poured in upon them, with the utmost spirit and determination, and only when almost annihilated did their spirit forsake them. But few escaped, hundreds being killed and wounded; while many seeing no other alternative, threw down their arms and came pouring over the works, bringing in several stands of colors. After this short but decisive contest, the brigade moved farther to the left, and erected new works.

On September 12 the regiment was transferred to the First Brigade of the Third Division, and five days later was transferred to the Third Brigade of this division. With this brigade, it marched on the 30th to Peeble's Farm, to the extreme right of the enemy's line, and, during the night succeeding, threw up a line of works on the crest of a hill. Early on the following morning the enemy, in great force, supported by artillery, made a furious attack. The works were held by the brigade until the line was broken to right and left of it, when, the enemy coming in upon both flanks, compelled it to give way, and nearly half of the regiment, including the colonel and seven line officers, were captured. The morning report of the following day showed but four commissioned officers and eighty-five enlisted men present for duty.

During the succeeding winter the regiment remained in camp with the brigade, on the extreme left of the line, participating in but two movements of importance. The first was made on December 4, by a force consisting of the Fifth Corps, one division of the Second, and a division of cavalry, all under command of General Warren, the purpose of which was to destroy the Weldon Railroad, as far south as possible. Striking the road twenty miles out from Petersburg, the work of destruction was continued, with little opposition, as far as Bellefield. The troops being without camp equipment, and exposed to a fearful storm of rain and hail, suffered severely. The second engagement was the Battle of Hatcher's Run, on February 6, 1865. It resulted in severe fighting, without decisive results.

=== End of the Siege and End of the War ===
The siege on Petersburg drew to a conclusion with the Battle of Fort Stedman. On March 25, the regiment was put in motion for the final conflict at Petersburg; the assault was successful yet repelled before it reached the ground, and immediately returned to its quarters.

On March 31, the regiment participated in the attack on the enemy's position at the Boydton Plank Road, and on the following day on his position at Five Forks, where Confederate troops were completely routed, losing most of the Confederate artillery.

The advantage here gained was rapidly followed up, and on April 9, the Rebel army laid down its arms at Appomattox Court House. While the Rebel troops were being paroled, the regiment performed guard duty in the town, with headquarters at the Court House.

On the 12th it moved in charge of captured property, and proceeded with it to Burkesville Station, on the South Side Railroad, after which it was encamped for two weeks along this road. It then moved to Petersburg, thence to Richmond, and finally went into camp on Arlington Heights opposite Washington, D.C., where on June 2, it was mustered out of service.

== Casualties ==
- Killed and mortally wounded: 5 officers, 104 enlisted men
- Died of disease: 2 officers, 64 enlisted men
- Total: 7 officers, 168 enlisted men
