= Owen Biddle Sr. =

American clockmaker and astronomer (1737–1799)

- Born: Owen Biddle; April 11, 1737; Philadelphia, Pennsylvania, British America
- Died: March 10, 1799 (aged 61); Philadelphia, Pennsylvania, U.S.
- Occupations: Cockmaker; watchmaker
- Spouse: Sarah Parke (m. 1760)
- Children: 10, including Owen Jr.

Owen Biddle Sr. (1737 – March 10, 1799) was a clockmaker and watchmaker by trade, a merchant in Philadelphia, Pennsylvania, an American Revolutionary War Colonel, and an astronomer and scientist.

== Ancestors and early life ==
He was a great-grandson of William Biddle, I (1630–1712), and Sarah Kempe (1634–1709), Quakers who emigrated to America in 1681. William Biddle was one of the Proprietors of West Jersey, and for many years a member of the Governor's Council of that colony. Owen was a grandson of William Biddle, II (1660–1743), and son of John Biddle, I, (1707–1789), who moved to Philadelphia about 1725 with his brother, William Biddle, III (b. 1698–1756). His father prospered as a merchant. After eight years of formal education, Owen Biddle became a clock and watchmaker.

== Patriot ==
He was engaged in mercantile pursuits, and with his younger brother, Clement Biddle, signed the Non-importation Resolutions of October 25, 1765. He was a delegate to the Provincial Conference January 23, 1775; member of the Committee of Safety from June 30, 1775, to July 22, 1776, during which period he served as de facto Governor of Pennsylvania on July 4, 1776, again on July 8 and 10, 1776, and finally on July 16, 1776. Owen Biddle continued service with the newly constituted Council of Safety from July 24, 1776, to March 13, 1777. He became a member of the Board of War on March 13, 1777, and was a member of the Pennsylvania Constitutional Convention of July 15, 1776.

In June, 1777, he was appointed Deputy Commissary General of Forage, with the rank of Colonel, by the Continental Congress. He served under his younger brother, Clement, who was the Commissary General of Forage and also a Colonel, until August 15, 1780. He and his brother labored for three years to obtain provisions for the Continental Army's horses, mules and other draft animals, while struggling to obtain funds, working with unreliable subordinates, and many unresponsive farmers.

== Astronomy and science ==
He was an early and active member of the American Philosophical Society, one of its curators from 1769 to 1772, and secretary from 1773 to 1782, when he became one of the councilors, continuing as such until his death. In 1782, he was elected a Fellow of the American Academy of Arts and Sciences. He was one of the committee of thirteen appointed by the Society to observe the transit of Venus on June 3, 1769. These observations were made with eminent success by three members of the committee, David Rittenhouse being stationed at Norristown, Dr. John Ewing at Philadelphia, and Owen Biddle at Cape Henlopen, Delaware.

== Family ==
He married Sarah Parke in 1760, and fathered ten children over a period of twenty years, including Owen Biddle Jr. (1774–1806), a member of the Carpenters' Company of the City and County of Philadelphia. He died on March 10, 1799, in Philadelphia.

== See also ==
- Biddle family
