= Chapman Biddle =

Union United States Army officer

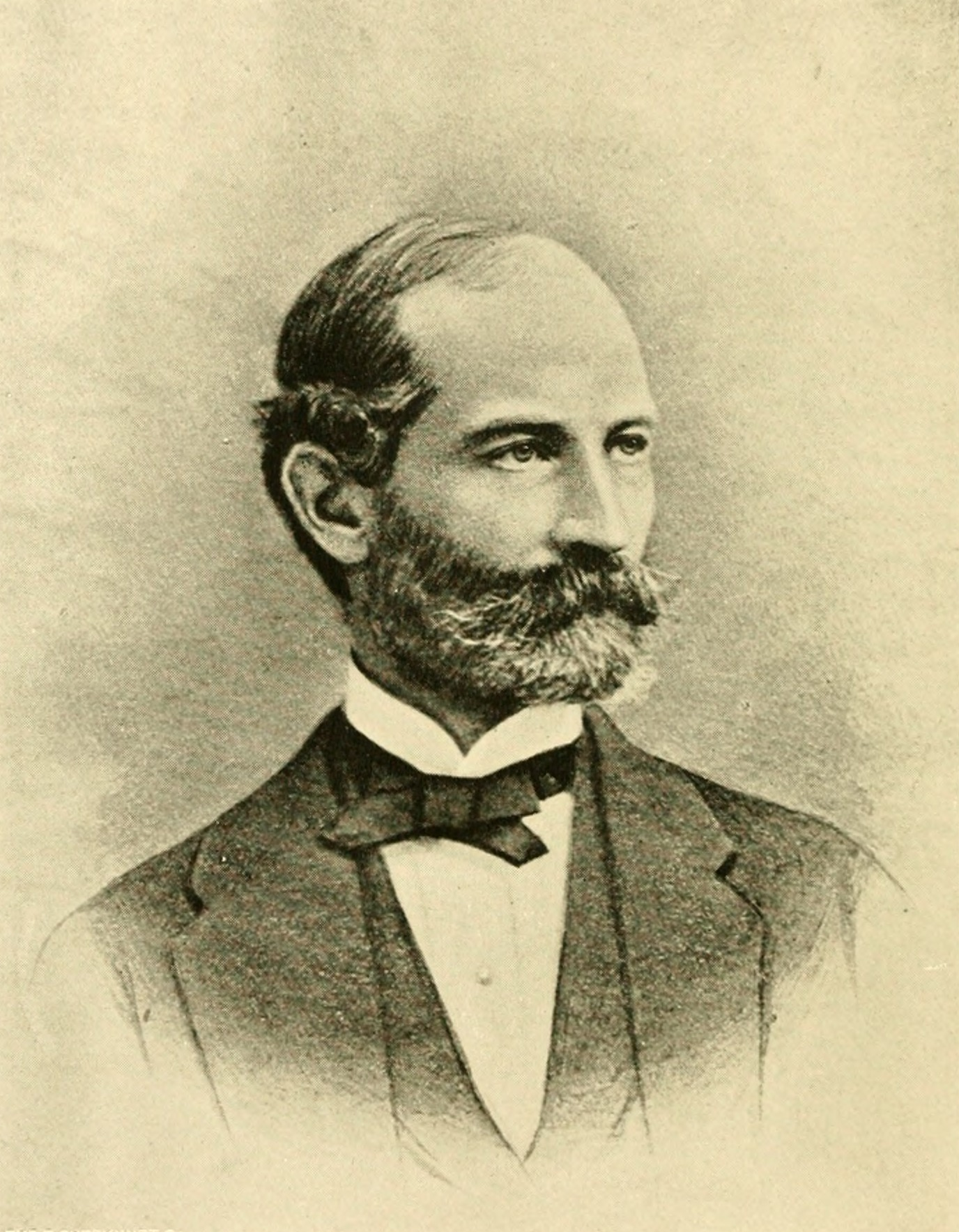
- Born: January 22, 1822; Pennsylvania
- Died: December 9, 1880 (aged 58); Philadelphia
- Burial place: Church of St. James the Less, Philadelphia
- Military career
- Allegiance: United States of America
- Branch: Union Army
- Service years: 1862–1863
- Rank: Colonel
- Unit: Infantry
- Commands: 1st Brigade, 3rd Division; 121st Pennsylvania Regiment
- Conflicts: American Civil War: Battle of Fredericksburg; Battle of Chancellorsville; Battle of Gettysburg; Bristoe Campaign; Mine Run Campaign
- Other work: Counsel

Chapman Biddle (January 22, 1822 – December 9, 1880) was a member of the prominent Biddle family of Philadelphia, Pennsylvania, who served as an officer in the Union Army in the American Civil War. He commanded a brigade of infantry at the Battle of Gettysburg.

== Early life ==
Chapman Biddle was born in Pennsylvania on January 22, 1822, and was educated in Philadelphia. He studied law, passed his bar exam in 1848, and established a private practice before the outbreak of the war.

== Civil War ==
Biddle was commissioned colonel of the 121st Pennsylvania Regiment, which was organized in Philadelphia. The regiment was mustered into the service on September 1, 1862, and joined the Army of the Potomac in October. It was held in reserve at the time of the Battle of Antietam; but it served at the Battle of Fredericksburg alongside the Pennsylvania Reserves, losing 149 casualties in an attack on the Confederate right flank. Biddle participated in the Battle of Chancellorsville in the Third Division of I Corps.

Biddle assumed command of the 1st Brigade, 3rd Division before the Battle of Gettysburg began on July 1, 1863. The assignment of Maj. Gen. John F. Reynolds as commander of the army's left wing led to acting promotion of brigade commander Brig. Gen. Thomas A. Rowley to command of the division while Maj. Gen. Abner Doubleday led the corps. Colonel Biddle led the four regiments of the brigade in the first day's fighting on McPherson's Ridge and the subsequent withdrawal to Cemetery Ridge. His report on the first day's fighting describes the brigade's fighting as taking place under heavy artillery fire. When the brigade was flanked by Confederate infantry, Biddle led an unsuccessful counterattack. Later he received a head wound from a spent Minié ball when Col. Abner Perrin's brigade attacked the brigade's fall-back position on Seminary Ridge. Biddle had his head bandaged, and then returned to his troops.

Returning to his regiment on July 2, after Rowley resumed brigade command, Biddle participated in the repulse of Pickett's Charge. By the end of the battle, only 84 of 263 soldiers were left in the ranks, with only 2 of the 7 officers remaining.

Biddle led the 121st Pennsylvania though most of the summer and autumn of 1863, including most of the Bristoe Campaign and the Mine Run Campaign, before being honorably discharged on December 10, 1863. His head wound, received at Gettysburg, eventually led to Biddle's departure from active service. His old regiment remained in service to the end of the war, being mustered out on June 2, 1865.

== Postbellum activities ==
After leaving the army, Biddle was a counsel serving the administration of Philadelphia. He also returned to his position as solicitor for the Pennsylvania Railroad Company, which had been held open for the duration of the war. He was involved in creating the city’s Fairmount Park. He also published an account of the first day of the battle of Gettysburg a few months before his death. In it he makes no mention of the Rowley court martial.

Chapman Biddle died on December 9, 1880, and was buried in the churchyard of Church of St. James the Less in Philadelphia. A speech was given on December 11, 1880, to the member of the Philadelphia bar to honor him.

A brigade tablet for Biddle’s brigade stands alongside Reynolds Avenue in the section of the Gettysburg National Military Park on McPherson's Ridge.
