= Thomas Dunlap =

American lawyer

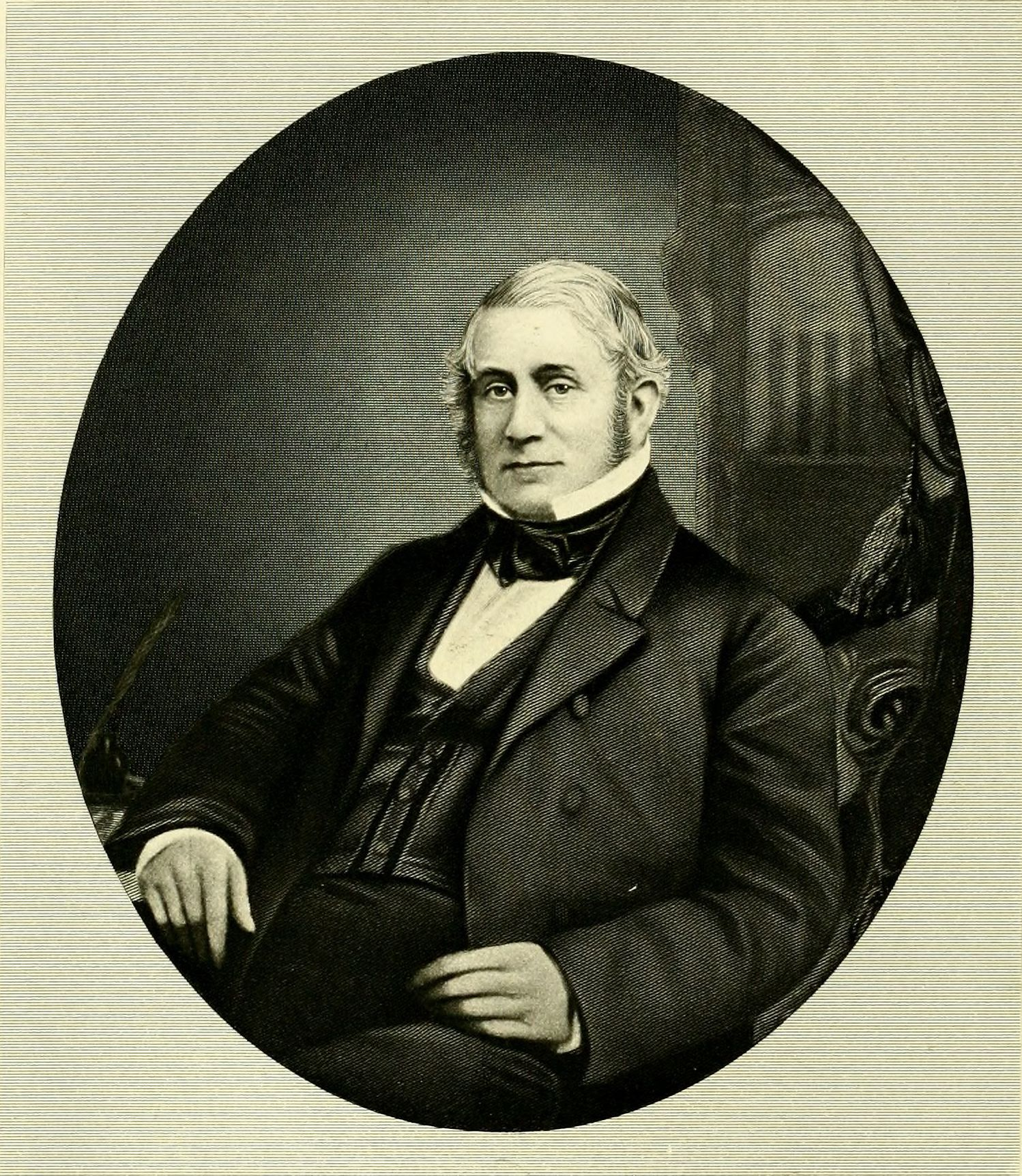
- Born: August 10, 1793
- Died: July 11, 1864 (aged 70)
- Alma mater: Yale College
- Occupation: Lawyer
- Employer: Second Bank of the United States
- Spouse(s): Ann Wilkinson Biddle Dunlap

Thomas Dunlap (1793 – July 11, 1864) was an American lawyer and banker.

Dunlap was a native, and during his life a resident, of Philadelphia. He graduated from Yale College in 1812. He was admitted to the bar in Philadelphia, Sept 4, 1816, and during most of his life was engaged in professional practice. When Nicholas Biddle resigned the office of President of the Second Bank of the United States, Dunlap was chosen to succeed him, and he remained in that position until the Bank suspended operations, when he resumed the profession of the law.

In 1837, Dunlap was elected as a member to the American Philosophical Society.

He died in Philadelphia July 11, 1864, aged 71 years.
