= Clement Biddle =

American Revolutionary War soldier

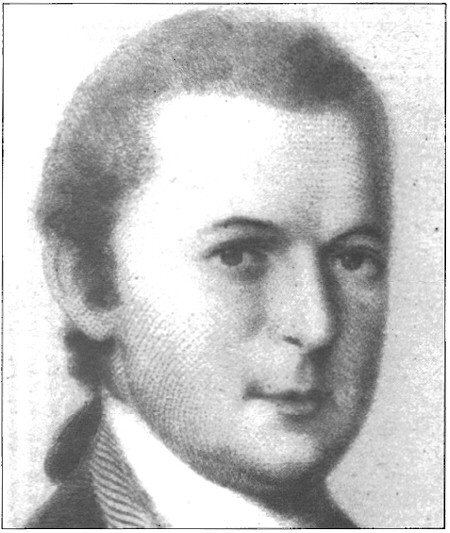
- Born: May 10, 1740; Philadelphia, Pennsylvania
- Died: July 14, 1814 (aged 74); Philadelphia, Pennsylvania
- Military career
- Allegiance: United States
- Branch: United States Army
- Service years: –1780
- Rank: Colonel
- Conflicts: American Revolutionary War: Battle of Princeton; Battle of Brandywine; Battle of Germantown; Battle of Monmouth
- Other work: United States Marshals Service

Colonel Clement Biddle (May 10, 1740 – July 14, 1814) was an American Revolutionary War soldier. Biddle fought in the Battle of Princeton, the Battle of Brandywine, the Battle of Germantown and the Battle of Monmouth. He was the Commissary General at Valley Forge under George Washington.

In 1781, Biddle was made quarter-master general of the Pennsylvanian troops. After the Revolutionary War, he became the first U.S. Marshal for Pennsylvania. Later, Biddle became a notary, scrivener, and broker.

== Life ==
Biddle was born May 10, 1740, in Philadelphia, Pennsylvania, to John Biddle and Sarah Owen. He was the younger brother of Owen Biddle, Sr. His great-grandson was Algernon Sydney Biddle.

Biddle was a part of the Society of Friends and helped organize the "Quaker Blues," a company of volunteers.

Biddle's first marriage was to Mary Richardson on June 6, 1764. They had one child, Francis, who died at childbirth.

His second marriage, which occurred August 18, 1774 was to Rebekah Cornell, the daughter of Rhode Island Chief Justice Gideon Cornell. They had thirteen children (five died in childhood):

- Frances (1775 - 5/16/1775, died at age 1 mo.)
- Thomas A (6/4/1776 - 6/3/1857) m. Christine Williams (1780-1861) in 1806.
- George Washington (2/21/1779 – 8/16/1811)
- Mary (1/12/1781 - 3/13/1850) m. Gen. Thomas Cadwalader (1779-1841), son of John Cadwalader
- Rebecca (11/7/1782 - 9/2/1870) m. Nathaniel Chapman (1780-1853) in 1808.
- Clement Cornell (10/24/1784 - 8/21/1855) m. Mary Searle Barclay (1785-1872), daughter of John Barclay in 1814.
- Anne (12/24/1785 – infant)
- Lydia H (5/12/1787 - 1826)
- Sarah T. (10/21/1789 - young)
- Anne Wilkinson (6/12/1791-7/4/1878) m. Thomas Dunlap (1793-1864) in 1822.
- John Gideon (6/10/1793 - ) m. Mary Biddle ( -1854), a cousin in 1826.
- James Cornell (12/29/1795-8/30/1838) m. Sarah Caldwell Keppele (1789-1877), daughter of Michael Keppele in 1825.
- Edward Robert Biddle (2/7/1798 – 11/11/1876) m. Elizabeth T Davis (abt 1798 – 1865) bef 1832.

He was elected to the American Philosophical Society in 1766.

During the American Revolutionary War, Biddle fought in the Battle of Princeton, the Battle of Brandywine, the Battle of Germantown and the Battle of Monmouth. He was the Commissary General at Valley Forge under George Washington, and his headquarters was at Moore Hall. Biddle resigned from the Army in 1780. In 1781, Biddle was made quarter-master general of the Pennsylvanian troops.

After the Revolutionary War, he was the first U.S. Marshal (1789–1793) for Pennsylvania.

In the 1790 census, Biddle's jobs were "Notary, Scrivener, and Broker," which made him a rich man.

== Death ==
He died in Philadelphia on July 14, 1814, and is buried at Christ Church in Philadelphia.

== See also ==
- Biddle family
