= Nathaniel Chapman =

American physician 1780–1853

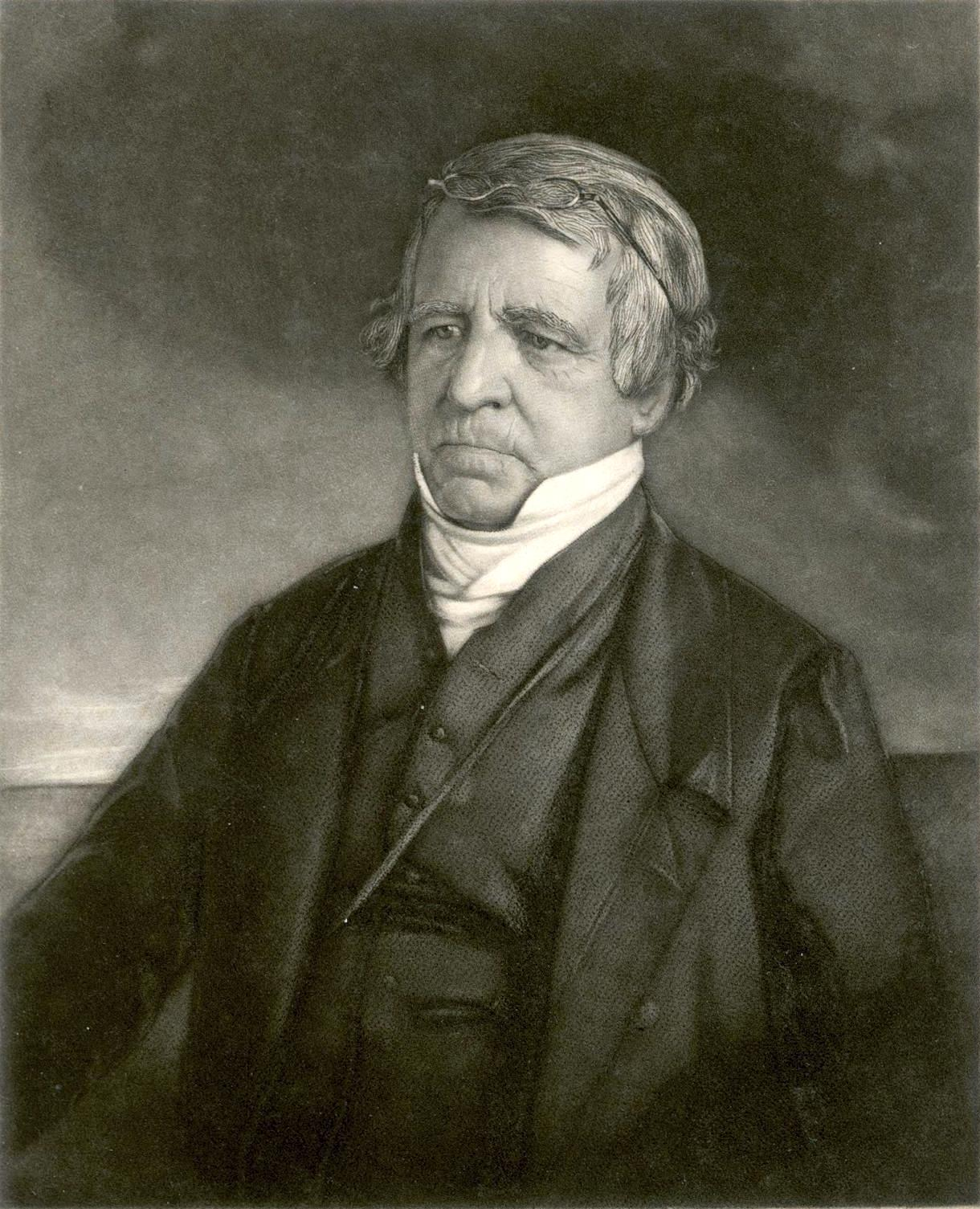
1846 engraving by Welch & Walters from a daguerreotype by M. P. Simmons

Nathaniel Chapman (28 May 1780 – 1 July 1853) was an American medical doctor. He was the founding president of the American Medical Association in 1847. Chapman founded the American Journal of the Medical Sciences in 1820 and served as its editor for some years, and also served as President of both the Philadelphia Medical Society and the American Philosophical Society (elected 1807).

== Early life ==
Chapman was born in Summer Hill, located north of Four Mile Run in present-day Arlington County, Virginia, son of George Chapman and Amelia MacRae. He received his early education in six years at the classical academy of Alexandria. He later attended two colleges for a short time, before moving to Philadelphia in 1797, where he began studying under Benjamin Rush and attending lectures at the University of Pennsylvania School of Medicine. He earned his M.D. in 1800, with a thesis on hydrophobia.

=== Personal life ===
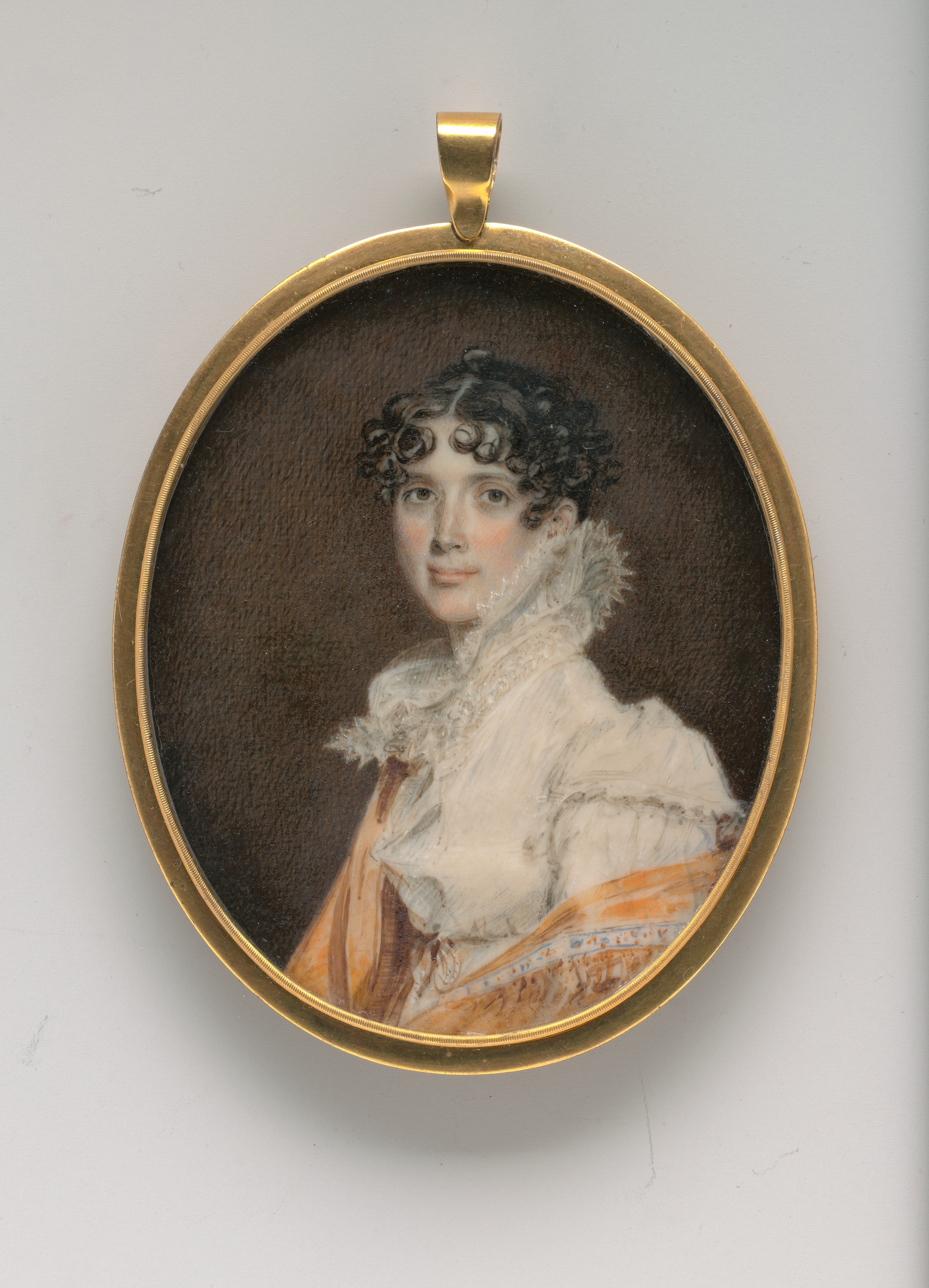
His wife, Rebekah Biddle, painted by Benjamin Trott (ca. 1815)

In 1808, he married Rebekah Biddle (1782-1870), the daughter of Clement Biddle and Rebekah Cornell of Philadelphia.

== Career ==
Upon his graduation, Chapman traveled to the United Kingdom in 1801, spending a year in London as a pupil of John Abernethy, and three in Edinburgh, where he attended lectures at the medical school of the University of Edinburgh. While in Edinburgh he became acquainted with a number of well-known people, including Dugald Stewart, the Earl of Buchan, and Henry Brougham.

Chapman returned to the United States in 1804, and established a medical practice in Philadelphia. He gave a private course of lectures on obstetrics in the same year, which proved so popular that, in 1806 at age 26, he was elected adjunct to the Professor of Midwifery at the University of Pennsylvania, and soon thereafter was made chair of Materia Medica. Upon the death of Benjamin Rush in 1813, he was transferred to the chair of Theory and Practice of Medicine (after Benjamin Smith Barton held the post for a brief time. Chapman gained the post in 1815.), which he would retain for nearly forty years, until his retirement in 1850. In addition to his lectures at the University of Pennsylvania, he also gave annual lectures at the Philadelphia Alms House and the Medical Institute of Philadelphia.

Of his published works, the most popular were Select Speeches, Forensic and Parliamentary (1804), touching on both medical and political matters, and Therapeutics (1817), a work on what was then termed materia medica that went through seven editions.

== Selected works ==
- An essay on the canine state of fever (dissertation) (1801)
- Lectures on the more important eruptive fevers, haemorrhages and dropsies, and on gout and rheumatism (1844)
