= Biddle Motor Car Company =

Defunct American motor vehicle manufacturer

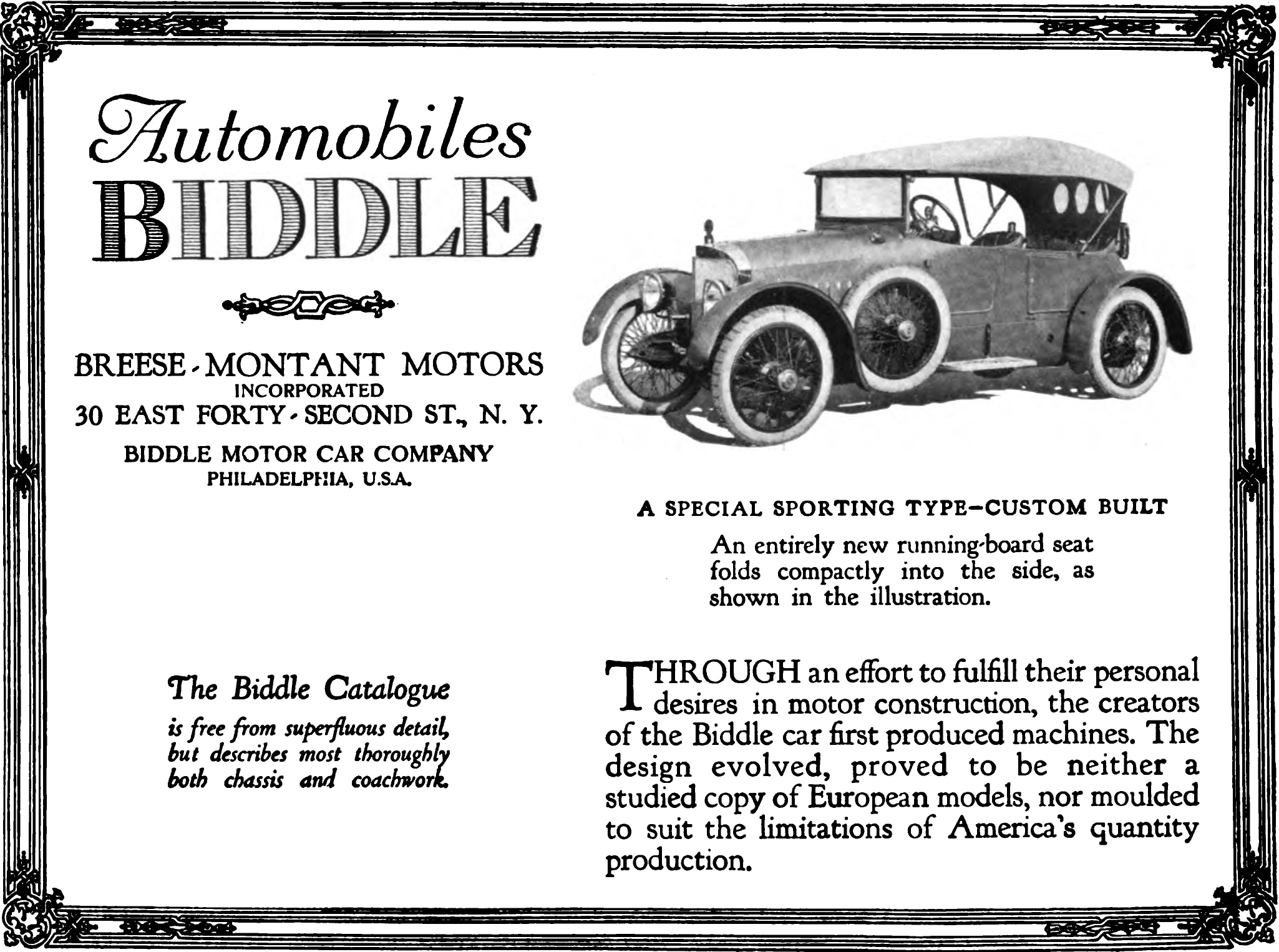
"A special sporting type—custom made" advertised in 1917

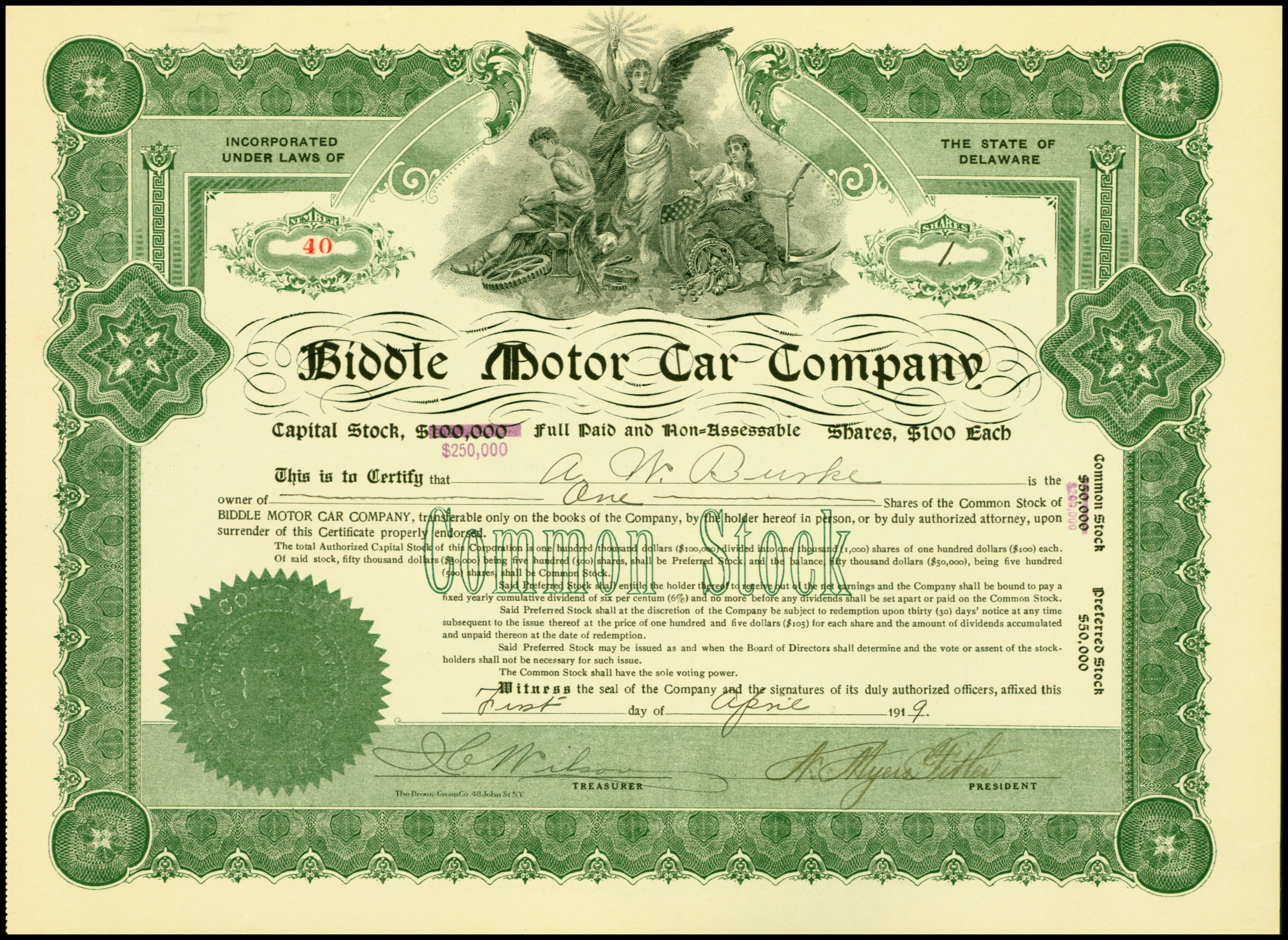
Share of the Biddle Motor Car Company, issued 1 April 1919

The Biddle Motor Car Company manufactured luxury automobiles in Philadelphia, Pennsylvania from 1915 to 1922.

"Information, rather than Persuasive Sales Talk" was the advertising slogan of the company, which was noted for its conservative advertising. The company produced six models, with the heaviest weighing 2,950 pounds with a 48 bhp (36 kW) four-cylinder engine being sold for $3475.

The company was incorporated in October 1915 and presented finished automobiles at the Philadelphia Auto Show in January 1916. It was namesake of the Biddle family, although R. Ralston Biddle did not seem to have a major role beyond lending the name. Car was an assembled car manufactured in Philadelphia. The first bodies were believed to be from the Fleetwood body company in Fleetwood, Pennsylvania. The first cars were equipped with Buda four-cylinder engines, 3 3/4 Bore by 5 1/8 stroke and Warner 3-speed transmissions. Some models featured Rudge-Whitworth wire wheels. The bodies were styled in the European tradition. Biddle stood out with V-shaped radiators, angular or cycle fenders, step plates instead of the usual running boards, and dual side-mounted wire wheels when that concept was still strictly European.

A Biddle advertisement appearing in Life Magazine in 1917 confirms that the car was "assembled" from parts produced by others, including a top-quality Duesenberg motor, and that it reflected European styling. The roadster shown in the ad closely resembles a contemporaneous Mercedes Benz sport model, with its deeply V-ed radiator, cycle fenders, wire wheels and step plates. From its dramatic prow, the long hood-line sweeps back to a raked windshield spanning an aeronautical cowl, then drops to the rakish line of its cut-down doors and finally flows into a streamlined tail.

The car is pictured in the unacknowledged drawing standing at the foot of a long drive winding down from a Colonial-style golf club through a manicured lawn. The drawing is heavily influenced by Japanese printmaking in its linearity, stark use of light and shade, and abstract composition. The sophisticated imagery of the advertisement is complemented by an elegantly lettered text, headed by the haiku, ‘Automobiles Biddle Speed’ and the following evocative declaration: "The thrills of speed with perfect control are his who drives the Biddle car equipped with Duesenberg Motor. Security and comfort are also his – for the character of construction assures them."

Both the spare, poetic copy and the oriental minimalism of the image clearly represent the high standard of design and equally high aspirations of the company for its customer base. Biddle was one of more than 2000 car makers, located all over the US in the first quarter of the twentieth century, who failed to survive the intensifying pressures of mass-production and national distribution in the late teens and the intense competition imposed by massive corporate consolidations in the early 1920s.
