= Elihu Spencer =

- Born: February 12, 1721; East Haddam, Connecticut
- Died: December 27, 1784 (aged 63)

Elihu Spencer (February 12, 1721 – December 27, 1784) was an American clergyman who served as a chaplain during the French and Indian War. During the American Revolution, he was invited to North Carolina by that colony's provincial congress to convince loyalist congregations to join the patriot cause.

Spencer was born in East Haddam, Connecticut and graduated from Yale in 1746. He prepared to become a missionary to the Six Nations Iroquois under David Brainerd and Jonathan Edwards. In 1748, he accompanied Edwards to an Indian conference in Albany, New York, and on September 14 of that year, was ordained.

He served as a missionary on the New York frontier, and in 1750 he was appointed pastor of the Presbyterian Church in Elizabeth, New Jersey. In 1756, he was appointed pastor of another Presbyterian Church in what is now Jamaica, Queens. Two years later, New York Governor James De Lancey appointed him chaplain of the colonies troops who were preparing for service in the French and Indian War.

After the war, Spencer served as pastor in Shrewsbury, Middletown Point, Shark River, and Amboy, New Jersey. In 1764 the synod of New York and Philadelphia send Spencer, along with Reverend Alexander McWhorter on a mission to organize the irregular North Carolina congregations.
