= Sydney Biddle Barrows =

American management consultant, madam, and writer

- Born: January 14, 1952 (age 74)
- Other names: Sheila Devin; Mayflower Madam
- Education: Fashion Institute of Technology
- Occupations: Madam, management consultant, socialite, and writer
- Spouse: Darnay Hoffman (1994–?)(divorced) death May 2, 2011
- Relatives: Biddle family, four Mayflower passengers

Sydney Biddle Barrows (born January 14, 1952) is an American businesswoman and socialite who became known as an escort agency owner under the name Sheila Devin; she later became known as "The Mayflower Madam". She has since become a management consultant and writer.

In October 1984, her escort service was disbanded, and after pleading guilty and being fined $5,000 for promoting prostitution, she wrote a 1986 autobiography, Mayflower Madam: The Secret Life of Sydney Biddle Barrows. A TV movie based on the book starring Candice Bergen was broadcast in 1987 under the title Mayflower Madam.

== Early life and education ==
Barrows comes from the Biddle family of Philadelphia, Pennsylvania and is descended from Mayflower passengers William Brewster, John Howland, Elizabeth Tilley, and Thomas Rogers. Her father was Donald Byers Barrows Jr. (1926–2019) of Philadelphia, a descendant of Charles John Biddle, and her mother was Jeannette Ballantine (1930–2011) of Rumson, New Jersey, who later married to Felix Molzer, a musician and director of the Monmouth Arts Center, New Jersey.

Barrows attended Stoneleigh-Burnham, a girls' boarding school in Greenfield, Massachusetts, and is an alumna of the Fashion Institute of Technology (FIT) in New York City.

== Career ==
She worked in 1975 as an assistant to Alan Snyder, the buyer for Abraham & Straus. She was introduced to high-class prostitution and started her own escort service named Cachet, which existed in New York City from 1979 to 1984. Some of its clients included industrialists, high-powered business executives, lawyers, foreign diplomats and Arabian oil sheiks.

In October 1984, Cachet was shut down, Barrows was arrested, and the Manhattan District Attorney's Office charged her with promoting prostitution. When arrested at her home office on the Upper West Side of Manhattan, Barrows identified herself as Sheila Devin; one report describes her as the CEO.

The name "Mayflower Madam" was coined by a New York Post reporter, Peter Fearon, who broke the story of Barrows's Mayflower connections. After her guilty plea, Barrows published a best-selling autobiography, Mayflower Madam: The Secret Life of Sydney Biddle Barrows (1986). Barrows appeared in 1987 on the late-night television series Saturday Night Live with a parody of her book; the sketch included Candice Bergen, who portrayed Barrows in the made-for-TV movie Mayflower Madam (1987). Barrows subsequently wrote two books on sexual etiquette.

In late 2008, Barrows finished Uncensored Sales Strategies: A Radical New Approach to Selling Your Customers What They Really Want—No Matter What Business You're In, co-authored with marketing expert Dan Kennedy. Since the mid-late 1990s, Barrows has run a consulting business with a focus on customer service and experience.

== Personal life ==
Barrows was divorced from the late Darnay Hoffman, a high-profile lawyer.

== In popular culture ==
- After pleading guilty to promoting prostitution, Barrows wrote a 1986 autobiography, Mayflower Madam: The Secret Life of Sydney Biddle Barrows. A TV movie based on this book and starring actress Candice Bergen was broadcast in 1987 under the title Mayflower Madam.
- The Law & Order episode "By Hooker, by Crook" is based on the Sydney Biddle Barrows case, with Patricia Clarkson playing the fictional madam, Laura Winthrop.
- The Miami Vice episode "By Hooker by Crook" is based on the Sydney Biddle Barrows case, with Melanie Griffith playing the fictional madam, Christine Von Marburg.

== Works ==
- Mayflower Madam: The Secret Life of Sydney Biddle Barrows (1986). With William Novak. New York: Arbor House. ISBN 0-87795-722-3, ISBN 0-8041-0150-7.
- Mayflower Manners: Etiquette for Consenting Adults (1990). With Ellis Weiner. New York: Doubleday. ISBN 0-385-26245-0.
- Just Between Us Girls: Secrets About Men from the Mayflower Madam (1996). With Judith Newman. New York: St. Martin's Press. ISBN 0-312-13993-4, ISBN 0-312-96047-6.
- Uncensored Sales Strategies: A Radical New Approach to Selling Your Customers What They Really Want – No Matter What Business You're In (2009). With Dan Kennedy. Entrepreneur Press. ISBN 1-59918-193-2, ISBN 978-1-59918-193-6.

== See also ==
- List of people from New York City
- List of prostitutes and courtesans
