= Biddle House =

Biddle House may refer to:

- Biddle House (St. Georges, Delaware), listed on the NRHP in New Castle County, Delaware
- Perry L. Biddle House, DeFuniak Springs, Florida
- Biddle House (Mackinac Island), Michigan

== See also ==
- Biddle Memorial Hall, Johnson C. Smith University, Charlotte, North Carolina
