= Owen Biddle Jr. =

American architect (1774–1806)

Owen Biddle, Jr.
- Born: April 28, 1774
- Died: May 25, 1806 (aged 32); Philadelphia, Pennsylvania
- Occupation: Architect
- Notable work: Designer of Philadelphia's Arch Street Friends Meetinghouse (c. 1803-1804)
- Parent(s): Owen Biddle, Sr.

Owen Biddle Jr. (April 28, 1774 – May 25, 1806) was an American carpenter and builder, based in Philadelphia. A Quaker, he designed that city's Arch Street Friends Meetinghouse circa 1803–1804. A Georgian structure, the building's East and West rooms were added, respectively, in 1804 and 1811.

== Background ==
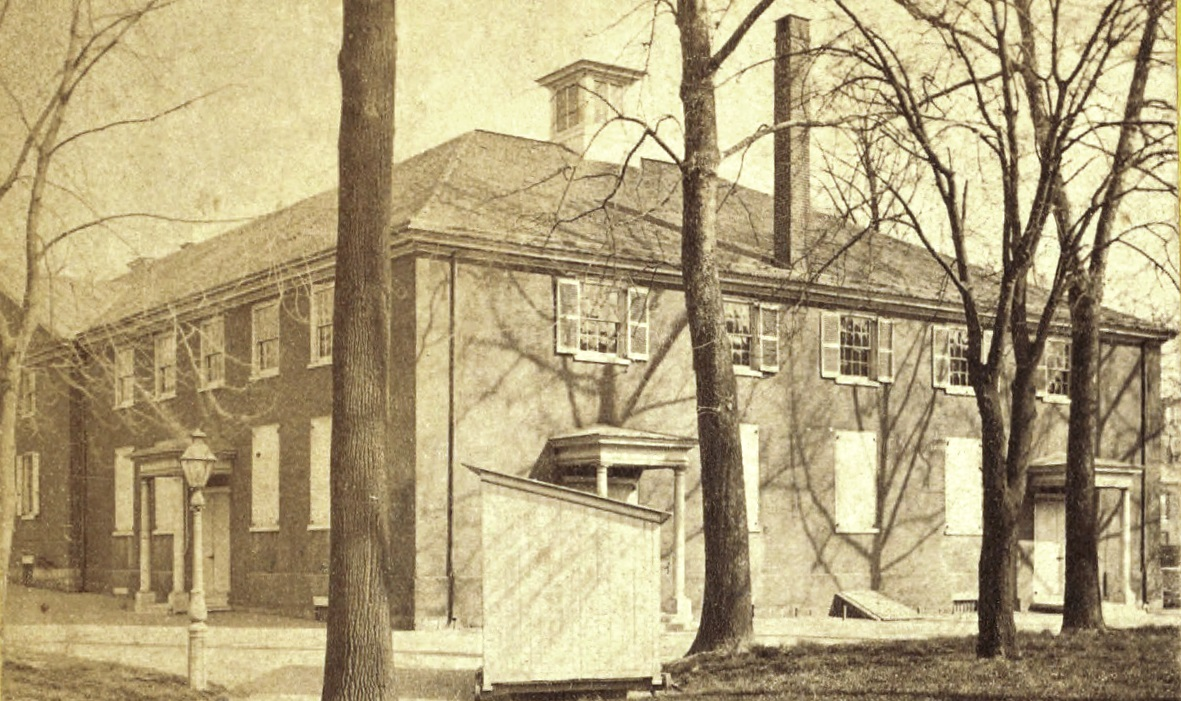
The Arch Street Friends Meetinghouse, shown c. 1861–1890, was designed by Owen Biddle Jr.

Biddle, the son of clockmaker Owen Biddle Sr., is best known for his influential handbook, The Young Carpenter's Assistant, which was published in 1805. In 1833, the book was revised and expanded by Philadelphia architect John Haviland, who republished it as An Improved and Enlarged Edition of Biddle's Young Carpenter's Assistant.

Biddle was elected to the Carpenters' Company of the City and County of Philadelphia in 1800. Three years later, he began work on the Arch Street Friends Meetinghouse, which is still in use today.

From 1805 to 1806, Biddle also designed and oversaw the creation of the Pennsylvania Academy of Fine Arts Building. In addition, he also played a role in the construction of several homes in Philadelphia's Society Hill neighborhood, several of which still stand, and in creating the Schuylkill Permanent Bridge. America's first covered bridge, the latter structure was designed by Timothy Palmer.

=== Death and interment ===
Biddle died at the age of 32 on May 25, 1806, and was buried on the grounds of the Arch Street Friends Meetinghouse.
