= William W. Biddle =

American social scientist

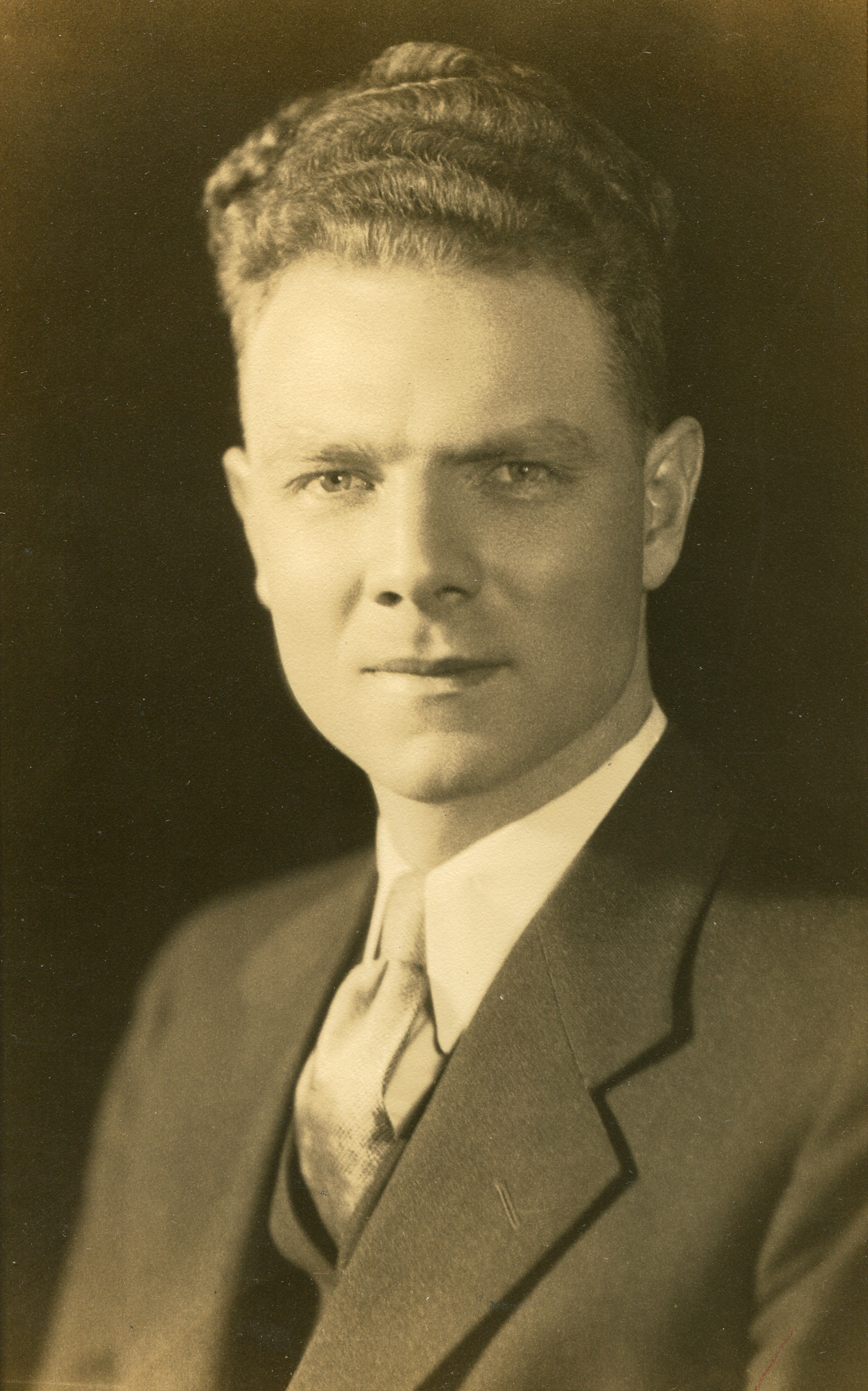
- William W. Biddle ca. 1930
- Born: William Wishart Biddle; June 19, 1900; United States
- Died: 1973 (aged 72–73); Columbia, Missouri
- Spouse: Loureide J. Biddle
- Children: Bruce J. Biddle
- Scientific career
- Fields: Community development, study of propaganda
- Institutions: Earlham College

William Wishart Biddle (June 19, 1900 – February 1973) was an American social scientist and a major contributor to the study of community development. Although details of his personal life are rare in written records, he made contributions to the field of psychology by developing frameworks in propaganda, education, and community development. Biddle outlined in his writings that propaganda was a form of persuasion for coercing people, illustrating examples from times of war. He established that education systems should develop each individual's intelligence and focus on critical thinking to avoid autistic thinking. Biddle defined and established various community development programs with a focus on environment, descriptive studies, politics, religion, and educational process.

There are several noted achievements in his lifetime. His 1931 article "A Psychological Definition of Propaganda" was one of the early psychological works on the subject of propaganda. He was one of the earliest practitioners of community development in the United States. His book The Community Development Process, written in collaboration with his wife Loureide J. Biddle, was translated into several languages.

His written work was consistent with the traditional American values of self help, fair play, and cooperation within the community. For several years, he directed a program at Earlham College known as Community Dynamics.

== Contributions to Psychology ==
=== Work on Propaganda ===
Biddle was one of the earliest practitioners of developing psychological frameworks for propaganda. He illustrated that propaganda is an understated form of persuasion that utilizes multiple methodologies of coercing people. These methods include: persuasion by way of regulating people's ideas through rational arguments; appealing to emotion through the use of sentiments and ideas pertaining to emotion; direct suggestion through using repetition in slogans or phrases; and indirectly appealing to emotion through cloaking propaganda as entertainment or news media coverage. He emphasized the importance of the propagandist being hidden when conveying their messages. Whenever a propagandist is unable to keep themselves hidden, the focus of attention on the propaganda will start to shift towards the emotional ideas and desired conduct of the perceiver through the use of direct suggestions.

Propaganda during war

Periods of war are often littered with all sorts of propaganda. Biddle articulated that during times of war, propaganda can be used to uphold attitudes and morale in favour of “our side” versus the “enemy.” During times of war, propaganda would gradually become more compelling to observers. With this, there were four standard rules that were created for the use of propaganda during war times. The first rule was that propaganda should try to avoid argumentation and should instead apply to specific emotions. The second rule was that propaganda should aim to fit certain situations into the arrangement of “us” versus “the enemy.” The third rule states that propaganda should motion to apply to certain social groups and not just individuals. The fourth rule highlights the importance of hiding the propagandist from the public. While there has been confusion as to the proper formation of the rules, the second rule is most often well-agreed upon.

Propaganda after war

After wars have concluded, propaganda still has lasting effects. Biddle demonstrated that during these periods, propaganda would put special emphasis on appealing to emotional themes and motifs in order to avert past the logical, thought-provoking arguments created from using propaganda. He detailed two types of emotional responses associated with propaganda: positive and negative. The importance of conveying a radical version of these emotional responses was explained as well. The propagandist should either convey a strong positive response to elicit feelings of enjoyment, enthusiasm, and love; or they should aim to convey a strong negative response to evoke feelings of avoidance, fear, and dislike. The process of conveying these emotions through propaganda works to separate those in favor from those against the subject of the propaganda.

Differentiating the “enemy” from “we,” a blockage associated with negativism and distrust is created that makes it more difficult to accept facts stemming from the “enemy,” regardless of how rational or logical an argument may be. Biddle simply put this phenomenon as a tendency to believe that there is always an opposing force that has views directly averse to that of “we.”

=== Work on Community Development ===
Biddle argues that there are varied differences in how community development is defined due to differences in the types of programs used as a means to work with people. Firstly, differences in the definition can be noted in the types of populations served. An example of a type of population served includes one's own nation focusing on lowest to middle-class backgrounds. The method of work done among rural versus urban communities can also differ causing an impact on how we define and perceive community development.

Defining and re-defining Community Development

Biddle argues that the approach, population served, and other factors are important characteristics of community development and how it is defined. It can be seen as something that is solely for improving rural areas or developing urban areas distinctively. Community is difficult to define, therefore developing one cannot be simply understood according to Biddle. Biddle states that a community developer undertakes pro-social programs to meet people's needs that includes a variety of programs such as building economy, social welfare, community organization, public health, education, and recreation. There are various formulas mentioned for the process of community development with many causes. Biddle states that it would become the human phase of every improvement effort.

Biddle gives a proposal on the redefinition of community development and also gives his own definition of community development. He argues that even though it may be defined by the program that bears the name, it can be shaped on the other part without forcing on the monotony of agreement. Biddle thinks that all approaches for the present are legitimate contributions, where each interpreter should state their own concepts, purposes, and even biases. Each interpreter can then find their position in the grand scheme of community development, and learn from other peoples' experiences in contrast programs. Through the whole period of the study, everyone should try to find the central core or common denominator among the many varieties.

Biddle gives his own definition of community development as a social process which focuses on personality growth through group responsibility. Human beings become more competent and get the control over local aspects of a frustrating and changing world. Biddle argues that most interpreters give major attention to other objectives, saying that human development is basic citizen participation and achievement of local initiative. After this common core, community development will be more clearly distinguished from community organization, instructional adult education, and programs that would mobilize people to serve political objectives.

Forms of Community Development (CD):

To Biddle, there are five different forms or programs or methods of community development: improvement of environment, descriptive studies, political emphasis, religious emphasis, and educational process.

1.CD on improving the environment

Community development programs that focus on improving the environment assume that having stronger social living and social services will ultimately be of benefit to the inhabitants of a community. Programs aimed at improving the environment usually consists of trying to improve the economy along with the natural environment of the community.

2.CD on descriptive studies

Programs of a more descriptive nature differ from programs that look for social and economic improvement by way of utilizing methods of measuring public opinion in order to survey life living in a community.

3.CD with political emphasis

Programs with a political emphasis come in a few different forms. There are programs that seek to develop a sense of pressure that affects public officials. This style of program aims to gain political leverage and power. There are also programs that have a goal of strengthening government authority. This would encompass any development programs that offer support for a political figure or ideology. Finally, there are programs in place that aid in the planning of cities or regions. Usually, programs of this nature are endorsed by some form of political authority and often seek to gain public support for the vision of the future that is proposed by the program.

4.CD with religious emphasis

A religious emphasis is another point of interest for community development programs. Typically, these programs are connected to a political goal of a religious nature. Programs in this respect often offer a mission pertaining to the promotion of democracy or they offer a compromise between competing interests and ideologies in a community. For a compromise between opposing ideologies to occur in a community, faith in the effectiveness of the community's social processes is encouraged in order to bring about a compromise between opposing interests through developing a mutual respect to each competing interest.

5.CD with educational focus

The final form of community development programs takes an educational focus. The underlying assumption for some community developers with this goal is to include community development into the educational curriculum as a teachable skill or multiple skills. There are also some community developers who are of the mind that community development is actually an open, continuous educational process that is passed down from generation to generation. The collective development of people pertaining to personality and behaviour in general is the driving goal to these types of community developers.

==== Temptations for the Community Developer ====
Biddle outlines the important duty that the developer, known as the "encourager", has on the group for development. With the goal of community development being the betterment of people, the criterion for evaluation in community development is what happens to the people as a result. According to Biddle, the role of the developer is to encourage and help individuals develop themselves toward a greater ethical citizenship. In times of success, the developers’ joy should not overshadow the evaluation of the development in terms of the people's progress. The developer must remain objective and keep the progress going. In times of failure, it is important to avoid discouragement. Throughout the process, Biddle articulates that the developer diminishes in power, and the power is transferred to the group members once they have gained enough strength to carry on the process. To Biddle, community development is an educational experience, where the developer acts as a balance wheel to keep the process going. In the end, the success of the developer lies in the success of the group.

=== Work on Education ===
Biddle believed that the education system should “seek out and develop the intelligence of each individual to its limit”. He described the education systems as only teaching students what is right and wrong and failed to teach them critical thinking, which makes the students think "autistically" and prone to more propaganda.

Autistic thinking arises from two deficiencies in education: the lack of sufficient information taught in social fields and the inability to understand different points of view. Education in history is essentially a nation's propaganda; the nation is always right and just. Such education would leave the students unable to think critically about the nation's affairs.

Biddle said that community agencies require cooperation in guiding youth to accomplish more effective occupational adjustments. Biddle argues that schools fail to carry out successful educational function without being greatly concerned of student's vocational possibilities. He also believes that employment services can not be effective without consistent interaction with schools for receiving pertinent information accumulated of youth.

Fixing education

Biddle believed that one way to fix autistic thinking in education is to expose children to others with opposing views and to teach them to have respect for them. Experiences of this nature will allow them to have critical thinking and be capable of having a rational opinion while in a debate with those with opposing opinions.

Biddle gives general education two definitions: a traditional definition and a functional definition. It is traditionally defined as a frame of cultural subject-matter that is required for students to attain in order to be educated. He defines it functionally as a course of action, and various experiences, by which students rely on as a way of living. Biddle argues that these definitions seem sterile and unreal to many students. He criticizes that such absorption of culture overlooks the central theme of western civilization, moral, and religious values that are critical in giving it meaning and direction. It also functionally gives a vocational emphasis which is conceived as merely an occupational skill and thus students graduate with a lack of background, sense of direction, and as an uncultured artisan.

Biddle states that the purpose of general education is to close the gap between adolescence and adulthood and this can be accomplished by the students exploration of his own habits, potentialities, and familiarity with the community and social order.

== Death and legacy ==
Biddle died at the age of seventy two in Columbia, Missouri. He was survived by his son, Bruce, who was the chairmen of the Department of Social Psychology at the University of Missouri.

After Biddle's death, a memorial fund was made in his honor at the University of Missouri where he presented his personal books and paper to the library. Biddle continued to be a spokesmen for community development throughout his writings.

In recognition of his books and writing in the field of community development, The Community Development Process has been translated into quite a few languages for universities around the world to access.
