= List of last words (18th century) =

List of last words
18th century	19th century	20th century	21st century

The following is a list of last words uttered by notable individuals during the 18th century (1701–1800). A typical entry will report information in the following order:

- Last word(s), name and short description, date of death, circumstances around their death (if applicable), and a reference.

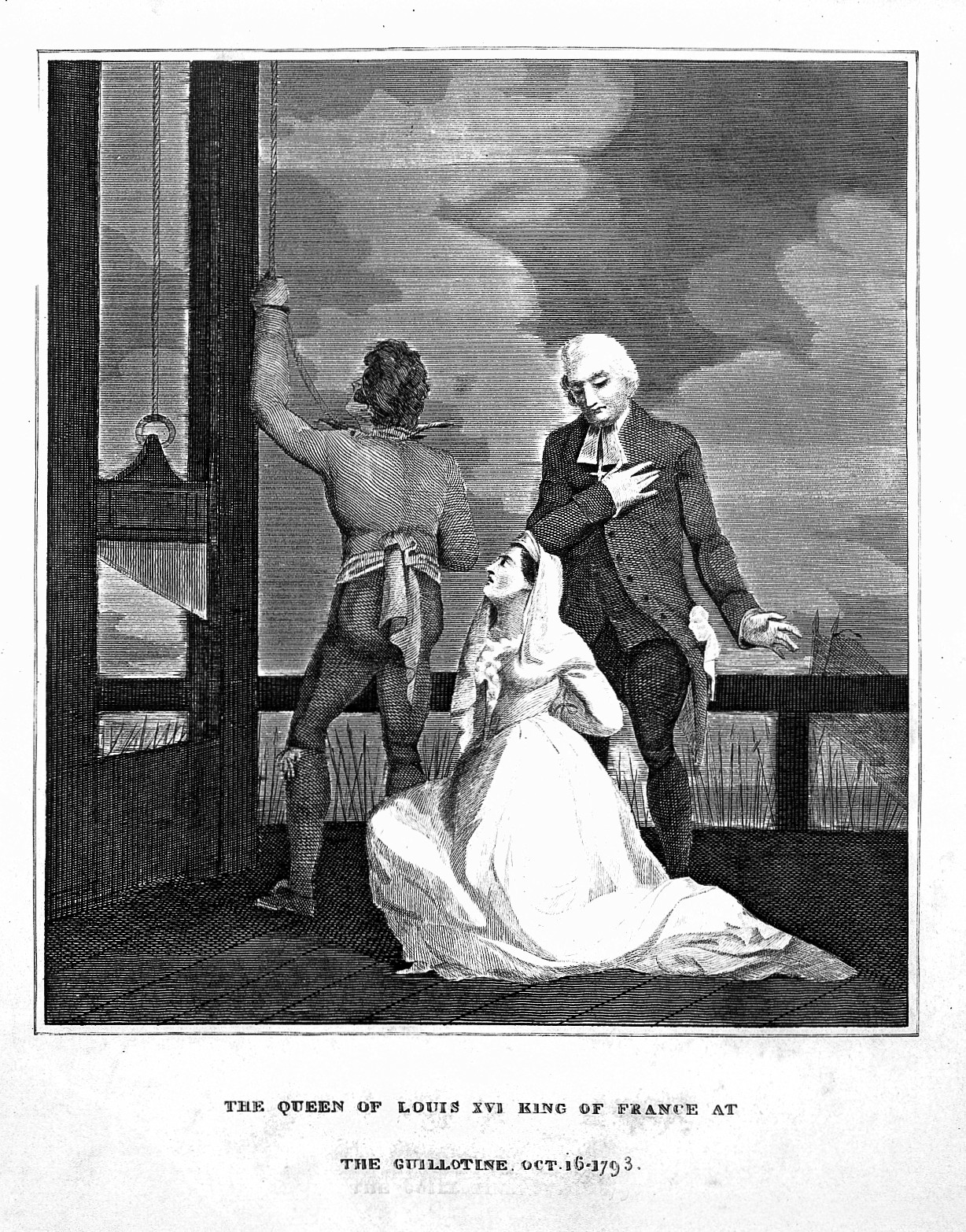
Marie Antoinette's most commonly reported last words were addressed to her executioner.

== 1701–1709 ==
"I wish I could enjoy / the rest of Spring / as the cherry blossoms are yet in bloom / in spite of the spring breeze / which is attempting to blow off all their petals."
(「風さそう花よりも / なお我はまた / 春の名残を / いかにとやせん」)
— Asano Naganori, daimyō of the Akō Domain in Japan (21 April 1701); death poem for his seppuku

"Grateful — in peace!"
— James II of England (16 September 1701), in reply to Louis XIV telling him that he would acknowledge James' son, James Francis Edward Stuart, as King of England, Scotland and Ireland

"Can this last long?"
— William III of England (8 March 1702), dying of pneumonia after breaking his collarbone, to his physician

"I am about to—or I am going to—die; either expression is correct."
("Je vais ou je vas mourir, l'un et l'autre se dit ou se disent.")
— Dominique Bouhours, French priest and grammarian (27 May 1702)

"With all my heart: I would fain be reconciled to my stomach, which no longer performs its usual functions."
— Charles de Saint-Évremond, French soldier, author and hedonist (29 September 1703), when a clergyman asked if he would be reconciled

"Thy will be done." (Note: Also reported as, "I suffer the violence of pain and death, but I know whom I have believed.")
("Fiat voluntas tua.")
— Jacques-Bénigne Bossuet, French bishop and theologian (12 April 1704)

"...in perfect charity with all men and in sincere communion with the whole church of Christ, by whatever name Christ's followers call themselves." (Note: Also reported as, "Oh! the depth of the riches of the goodness and knowledge of God. Cease now" (to Damaris, Lady Masham, who was reading to him from the Psalms).)
— John Locke, English philosopher and physician (28 October 1704) (Note: Egbert incorrectly gives Locke's date of death as 28 October 1714.)

"Let me die to the sound of sweet music."
— Leopold I, Holy Roman Emperor (5 May 1705)

"It is all the same in the end."
— Titus Oates, English priest and perjurer, fabricator of the "Popish Plot" (12/13 July 1705)

"Wherever I look I see nothing but the Divinity.—I have committed numerous crimes and I know not with what punishments I may be seized.—The agonies of death come upon me fast.—I am going. Whatever good or evil I have done, it was for you. No one has seen the departure of his own soul; but I know that mine is departing."
— Aurangzeb, seventh Mughal emperor (3 March 1707), in a letter to his youngest son, Muhammad Kam Bakhsh

"Dear Bob, I have nothing to leave thee to perpetuate my memory but two helpless girls. Look upon them sometimes, and think of him who was to the last moment of his life thine, George Farquhar."
— George Farquhar, Irish dramatist (29 April 1707), to his friend Robert Wilks

"I wish to die sitting, in tribute to the most worshipful will of my good and precious Jesus."
— Marcello d'Aste, Italian Roman Catholic cardinal (11 June 1709)

== 1710–1719 ==
"Do you wish to hasten my last hour?" (Note: Also reported as, "It is a great consolation for a dying poet to have never written a word against morality.")
— Nicolas Boileau-Despréaux, French poet and critic (13 March 1711), to a playwright who asked him to read his new play

"God's will be done."
— Thomas Ken, English bishop (19 March 1711)

"Pray, pray!"
— Thomas Halyburton, Scottish divine (23 September 1712)

"If you have baked me so you also should eat me!" (Note: These last words are considered legendary. Also reported as, "Now that you have roasted me, you might as well devour me.")
— Juraj Jánošík, Slovak highwayman known as "the Slovak Robin Hood" (17 March 1713), refusing to name fellow robbers prior to jumping onto the hook on which he was to be hung

"A life spent in the service of God, and communion with Him, is the most comfortable and pleasant life that any one can live in this present world."
— Matthew Henry, British Nonconformist minister and author (22 June 1714)

"Use it for the good of my people." (Note: Also reported as, "Oh my brother! Oh my poor brother!" (referring to James Francis Edward Stuart). This version of Anne's last words lacks evidence.)
— Anne, Queen of Great Britain (1 August 1714), handing the Lord High Treasurer's staff of office to Charles Talbot, 1st Duke of Shrewsbury

"Not my will, but thine be done."
— François Fénelon, French Roman Catholic archbishop, theologian and writer (7 January 1715), quoting Jesus

"I'm going, but the State will always remain." (Note: Described by Tahourdin as "almost his last words". Last words also reported as, "I thought that dying had been more difficult", "Why weep ye? Did you think I should live forever? I thought dying had been harder", and as "O God, come unto mine aid; O Lord, make haste to help me.")
("Je m'en vais, mais l'État demeurera toujours.")
— Louis XIV, king of France (1 September 1715)

"Promise me you will never again marry an old man."
— William Wycherley, English dramatist (1 January 1716), to his wife. He had married a much younger woman less than twelve days before his death.

"Had I known—"
("Ankah me nim ah...")
— Osei Kofi Tutu I, one of the founders of the Ashanti Empire (c. 1717), shot to death during war against the Akyem

"To be like Christ is to be a Christian."
— William Penn, English writer and religious thinker, founder of the Province of Pennsylvania (30 July 1718)

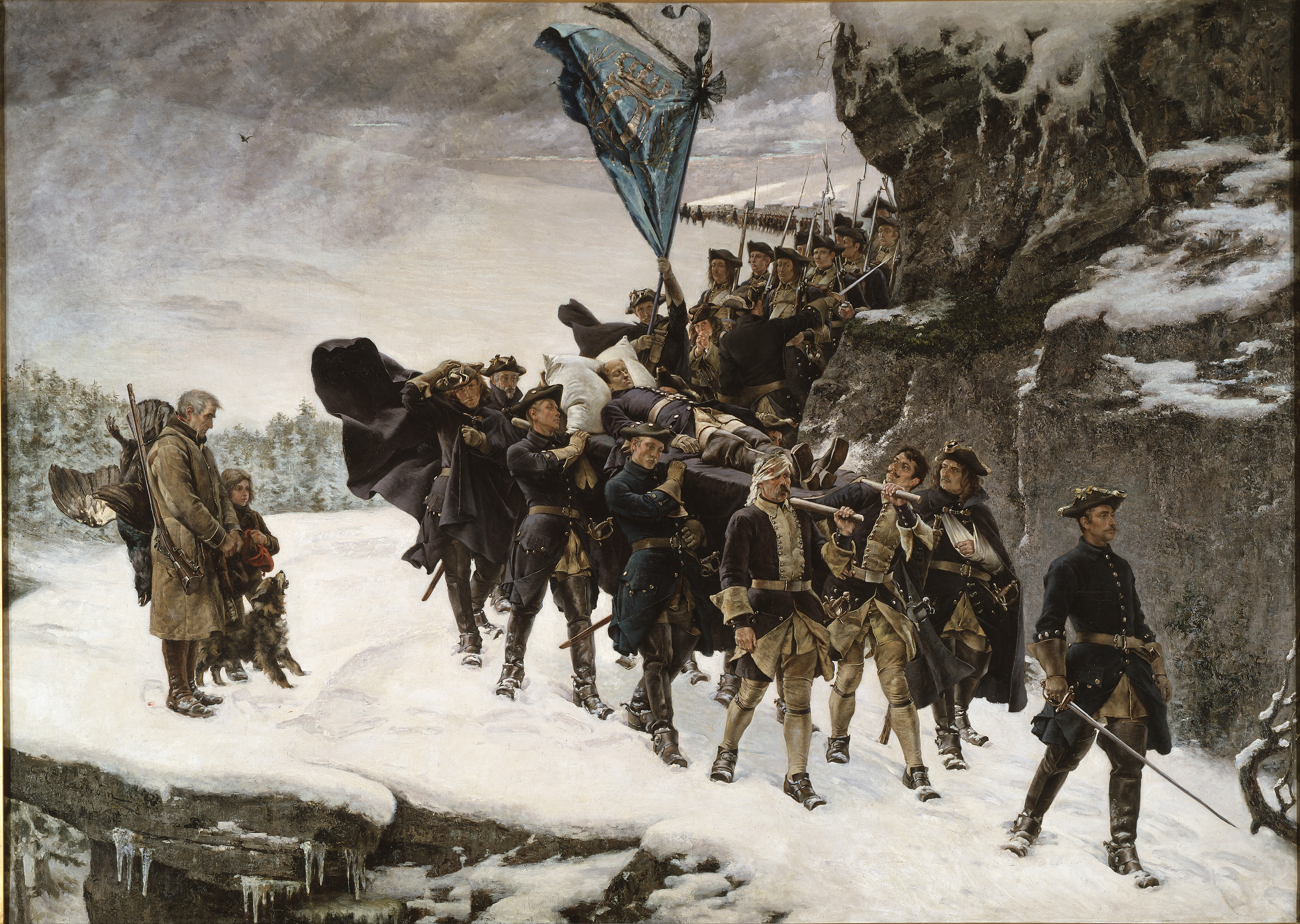
Charles XII of Sweden, his body here pictured on its journey to Stockholm, was shot dead while inspecting his army's trenches.

"I am coming down now."
("Jag går ned nu.")
— Charles XII, King of Sweden (30 November 1718) when stepping down from his perch into an entrenchment just as he was shot in the head

"See in what peace a Christian can die." (Note: Also reported as, "I have sent for you to see how a Christian can die" and as "See how a Christian dies." The story of Addison's last words is disputed.)
— Joseph Addison, English writer and politician (17 June 1719), to his stepson, Edward Rich, 7th Earl of Warwick

"God be thanked, I have had a very good night."
— George Smalridge, Bishop of Bristol (27 September 1719)

== 1720–1729 ==
"Be fruitful."
— Increase Mather, New England Puritan clergyman, president of Harvard College (23 August 1723)

"I have ever cherished an honest pride; never have I stooped to friendship with Jonathan Wild, or with any of his detestable thief-takers; and though an undutiful son, I never damned my mother's eyes."
— Jack Sheppard, English thief and prison escapee (16 November 1724), prior to execution by hanging

"Lord Jesus, receive my soul!"
— Jonathan Wild, London organized crime figure (24 May 1725), prior to execution by hanging (Note: Marvin expresses doubt about the authenticity of these last words.)

"I don't know what I may seem to the world. But as to myself I seem to have been only like a boy playing on the seashore and diverting myself now and then in finding a smoother pebble or a prettier shell than the ordinary, whilst the great ocean of truth lay all undiscovered before me."
— Isaac Newton, English physicist (31 March [O.S. 20 March] 1727)

"Yes."
— August Hermann Francke, German Lutheran clergyman and theologian (8 June 1727), when his wife asked if his Savior was still with him

"Is this dying? Is this all? Is this all that I feared when I prayed against a hard death? Oh! I can bear this! I can bear it! I can bear it! I am going where all tears will be wiped from my eyes."
— Cotton Mather, New England Puritan minister and author (13 February 1728). His wife wiped his eyes with her handkerchief as he said the last words, alluding to Revelation 21:4.

"I have always endeavored, to the best of my ability, to serve God, my king and my country. I go to the place God has designed for those who love him." (Note: Also reported as, "The Catholic faith is, to love God and to love man. This is the best faith, and to its entertainment I exhort you all.")
— Anthony Collins, English philosopher and deist (13 December 1729)

== 1730–1739 ==
"Ain't they darlin'?"
— Sally Basset, enslaved woman from Bermuda (6 or 21 June 1730), looking at the logs prepared to fuel her burning at the stake for poisoning

"This is a struggle which all men must go through, and which I bear not only with patience, but with willingness."
— Thomas Woolston, English theologian (27 January 1733), dying while imprisoned for blasphemy

"O God—if there be a God—I desire Thee to have mercy on me."
— Matthew Tindal, English deist author (16 August 1733)

"One hundred and forty-four."
— Thomas Fantet de Lagny, French mathematician (11 April 1734), responding to the question "What is the square of 12?" on his deathbed

"Now all is over—let the piper play 'Ha til mi tulidh' [we return no more]."
— Rob Roy MacGregor, Scottish outlaw and folk hero (28 December 1734) (Note: Year of death incorrectly given by Marvin as 1743.)

"What Cato did, and Addison approved, cannot be wrong."
— Eustace Budgell, English writer and politician (4 May 1737); his suicide note, written before drowning himself in the Thames. Joseph Addison was Budgell's cousin.

"It would be hard indeed if we two dear friends should part after so many years, without one sweet kiss."
— Turlough O'Carolan, Irish Celtic harper, composer and singer (25 March 1738), to a bowl of wine he was no longer able to drink

== 1740–1749 ==
"No, not quite naked. I shall have my uniform on." (Note: Also reported as, "Herr Jesu, to thee I live; Herr Jesu, to thee I die; in life and in death thou art my gain" ("...Du bist mein Gewinn").)
— Frederick William I of Prussia, King in Prussia and Elector of Brandenburg (31 May 1740), in response to priest or family members quoting Job 1:21

"Oh Lord! Forgive the errata!"
— Andrew Bradford, American newspaper printer and publisher (24 November 1742) (Note: Marvin describes these last words as doubtful.)

"I have something to say to you, sir... 'Tis gone."
— Richard Savage, English poet (1 August 1743), unable to remember what he wanted to say to his keeper at Bristol Newgate Prison. The keeper found Savage dead the next morning.

"I am dying, sir, of a hundred good symptoms." (Note: Also reported as, "There is nothing that is meritorious but virtue and friendship; and, indeed, friendship itself is only a part of virtue.")
— Alexander Pope, English poet (30 May 1744)

"You are fighting for an earthly crown; I am going to receive a heavenly one." (Note: It is uncertain whether Gardiner actually spoke these words.)
— James Gardiner, British Army officer (21 September 1745), to a Jacobite officer after being mortally wounded at the Battle of Prestonpans

"Ah! A German and a genius! A prodigy—admit him!"
— Jonathan Swift, Anglo-Irish author and cleric (19 October 1745), referring to George Frideric Handel, who had come to visit him

"Dulce et decorum est pro patria mori." (Note: He is also mentioned as having laughed when overcrowded timber stand collapsed, killing nine people who came to see him die; his laughter at this incident, even as he was executed, is said to be the origin of the phrase "to laugh one's head off".)
— Simon Fraser, 11th Lord Lovat (9 April 1747), quoting a line of Horace when executed by beheading as a Jacobite rebel

"Thou dog!"
— Nader Shah, Shah of Iran (Persia) (19 June 1747), to one of his assassins

"Lord, now let thy servant depart in peace."
— David Brainerd, American missionary to the Native Americans (9 October 1747), quoting Luke 2:29

"Waiting God's leave to die." (Note: Also reported as, "It is a great mercy that I have no manner of fear or dread of death. I could, if God please, lay my head back and die without terror this afternoon.")
— Isaac Watts, English Christian minister, hymn writer and theologian (25 November 1748)

== 1750–1759 ==
"Don't cry for me, for I go where music is born."
— Johann Sebastian Bach, German composer (28 July 1750)

"God, who pleased me here, will do what he pleases with me hereafter, and he knows best what to do. May he bless you."
— Henry St John, 1st Viscount Bolingbroke, English politician (12 December 1751), to Philip Stanhope, 4th Earl of Chesterfield. Bolingbroke also reaffirmed his Deist convictions.

"For the sake of decency, gentlemen, don't hang me high."
— Mary Blandy, English convicted murderer (6 April 1752), prior to execution by hanging

"I have often read and thought of that scripture, but never till this moment did I feel its full power, and now I die happy."
— Joseph Butler, English Anglican bishop and theologian (16 June 1752), referring to John 6:37

"Christ Jesus the Saviour of sinners and life of the dead. I am going, going to Glory! Farewell sin! Farewell death! Praise the Lord!"
— Richard Newton, English educator and clergyman (21 April 1753)

"I do not suffer, my friends; I only feel a certain difficulty of living."
— Bernard Le Bovier de Fontenelle, French author (9 January 1757), dying at the age of 99

"O death, why art thou so long in coming?"
— Robert-François Damiens, French domestic servant, attempted assassin of Louis XV (28 March 1757), during execution by dismemberment

"Let all brave Prussians follow me!"
— Kurt Christoph Graf von Schwerin, Prussian Generalfeldmarschall (6 May 1757), just before being fatally struck by enemy fire at the Battle of Prague (1757)

"Trust in God and you need not fear." (Note: Also reported as, "Trust in God and you shall have nothing to fear.")
— Jonathan Edwards, American revivalist preacher and theologian (22 March 1758), when someone lamented what his loss would mean to the church and to the College of New Jersey

"Sic transit gloria mundi."
— Pope Benedict XIV (3 May 1758)

"Peace."
— William Webster, British priest in the Church of England and theological writer (4 December 1758)

"Precious salvation!"
— James Hervey, English clergyman and writer (25 December 1758)

"No."
— Eugene Aram, English philologist and murderer (16 August 1759), when asked if he had anything to say before hanging

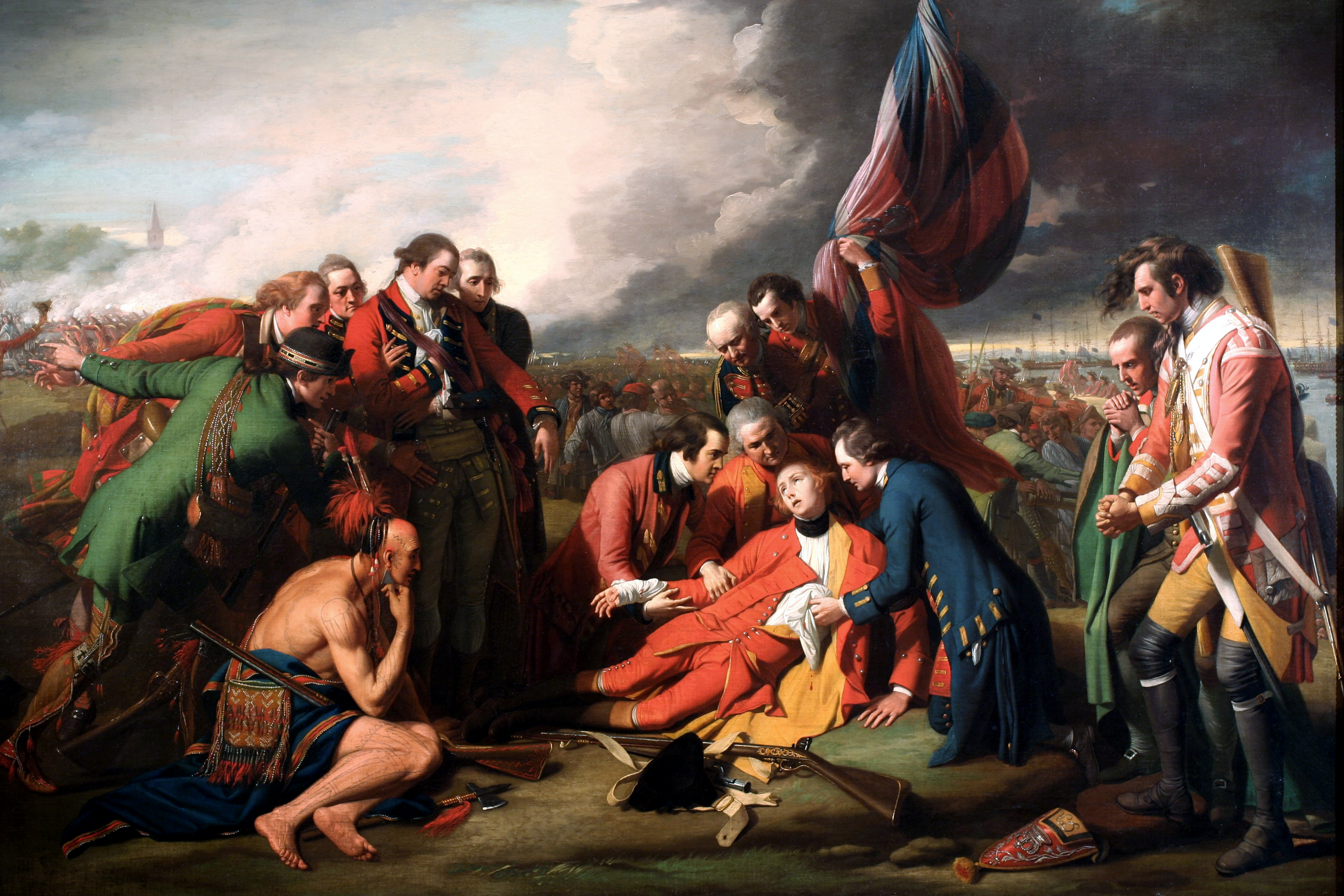
The Death of General Wolfe by Benjamin West.

"Go, one of you, to Colonel Burton; tell him to march Webb's regiment down to Charles River, to cut off their retreat from the bridge. Now, God be praised, I will die in peace!" (Note: Also reported as, "What, do they run already? Then I die happy" or "Then God be praised; I die happy.")
— James Wolfe, British Army general (13 September 1759), mortally wounded at the Battle of the Plains of Abraham, on learning that the French forces were fleeing

"So much the better. I am happy that I shall not live to see the surrender of Quebec. I have much business that must be attended to of greater moment than your ruined garrison and this wretched country."
— Louis-Joseph de Montcalm, French general (14 September 1759), on being told the wound he had received at the Battle of the Plains of Abraham was mortal

== 1760–1769 ==
"Now, my dear son, I am going to the Saviour. I am ready; I am quite resigned to the will of my Lord. If He is no longer willing to make use of me here I am quite ready to go to Him, for there is nothing more in my way."
— Nicolaus Zinzendorf, German religious and social reformer and bishop of the Moravian Church (9 May 1760), to his son-in-law

"It has all been most interesting."
— Mary Wortley Montagu, English traveler (21 August 1762)

"Wait a second." (Note: Also reported as, "Stay a little longer, M. le Curé, and we will go together.")
— Madame de Pompadour, chief mistress of Louis XV of France (15 April 1764), applying rouge to her cheeks before her death

"What the devil do you mean to sing to me, priest? You are out of tune."
— Jean-Philippe Rameau, French composer (12 September 1764), to his confessor

"It is a great consolation to me, in my last hour, that I have never wilfully offended anyone, and that there is not a drop of blood on my hands."
— Frederick V of Denmark (14 January 1766)

"I could wish this tragic scene were over, but I hope to go through it with becoming dignity."
— James Quin (21 January 1766), English actor

"I did not think that they would put a young gentleman to death for such a trifle."
— François-Jean de la Barre, French nobleman (1 July 1766), prior to execution by beheading for blasphemy and sacrilege

"Now it has come."
— Laurence Sterne, Anglo-Irish novelist and Anglican cleric (18 March 1768)

"Now, God be praised, only one hour!"
— Christian Fürchtegott Gellert, German poet (13 December 1769), on being told he had only an hour to live

== 1770–1779 ==
"I am dying."
— George Whitefield, Anglican cleric and evangelist (30 September 1770), to a servant

"The priest could never draw another thing from dying but 'Dear Sir, you are so kind.'"
("Le prêtre ne put jamais tirer autre chose du mourant que: 'Monsieur, vous avez bien de la bonté.'")
— Louis Petit de Bachaumont, French writer (29 April 1771)

"Molly, I shall die!"
— Thomas Gray, English poet (30 July 1771)

"He has indeed been a precious Christ to me; and now I feel him to be my rock, my strength, my rest, my hope, my joy, my all in all."
— Thomas Rutherforth, English churchman and academic (5 October 1771)

"What o'clock is it?" (On being told) "It is well; I thank you; God bless you."
— Emanuel Swedenborg, Swedish theologian, scientist, philosopher and mystic (29 March 1772)

"Give Dayrolles a chair."
— Philip Stanhope, 4th Earl of Chesterfield, British statesman and diplomat (24 March 1773), asking a servant to seat his godson, Solomon Dayrolles

"No, it is not."
— Oliver Goldsmith, Anglo-Irish novelist, playwright and poet (4 April 1774), in response to his physician asking if his mind was at ease

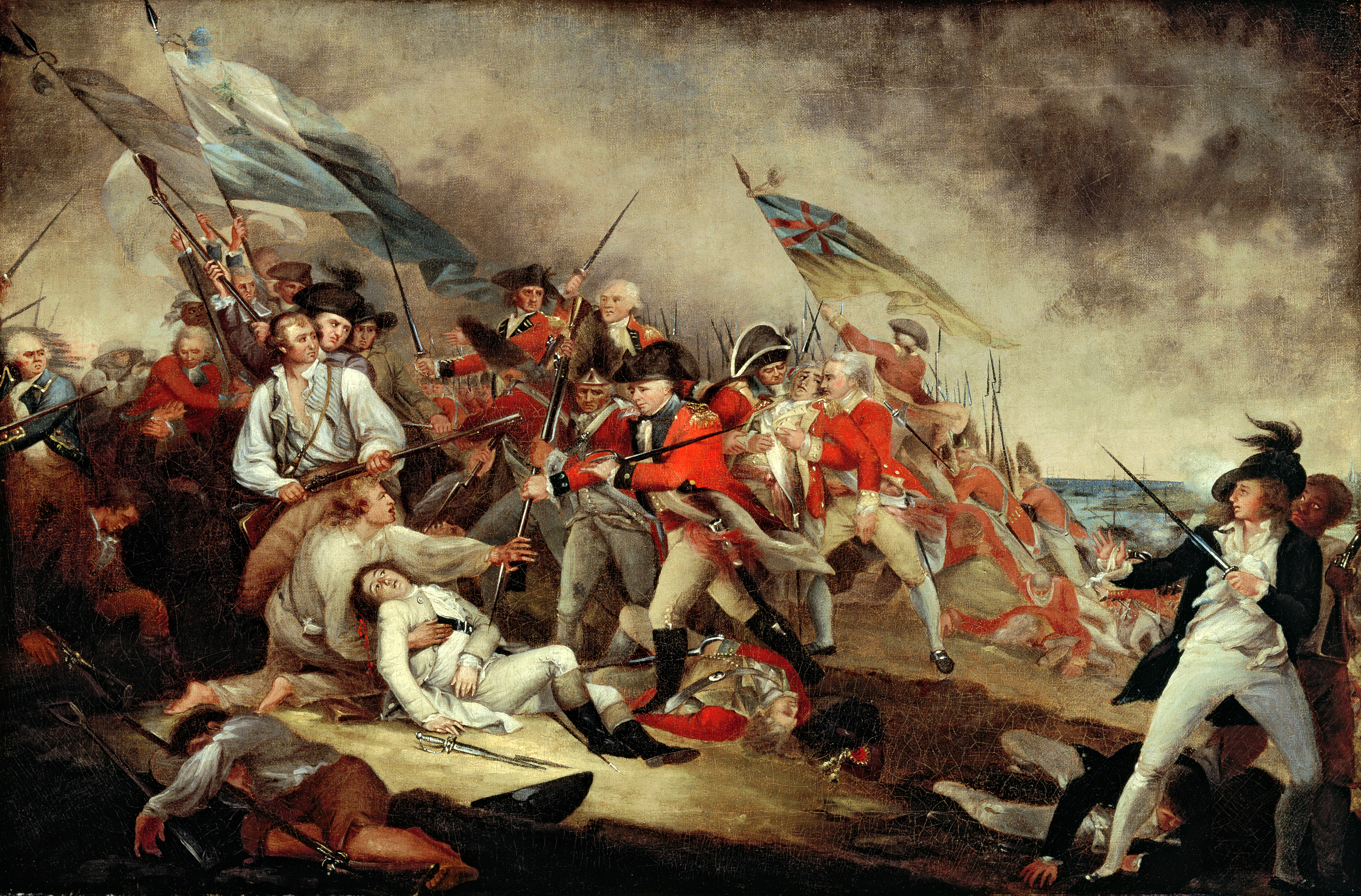
The Death of General Warren at the Battle of Bunker's Hill, June 17, 1775 by John Trumbull.

"I am a dead man: fight on, my brave fellows, for the salvation of your country."
— Joseph Warren, American physician and Patriot (17 June 1775), mortally wounded at the Battle of Bunker Hill

"What news from Boston?"
— Richard Montgomery, Irish soldier, major general in the Continental Army (31 December 1775), killed at the Battle of Quebec (1775)

"Young man, you have heard, no doubt, how great are the terrors of death. This night will probably afford you some experience; but you may learn, and may you profit by the example, that a conscientious endeavor to perform his duty through life will ever close a Christian's eyes with comfort and tranquility!" (Note: Also reported as, "Your highness has made me too great for my house.")
— William Battie, English psychiatrist (13 June 1776), to his caretaker

"I am very ill. Send for Zimmermann. In fact, I think I'll die today."
— Ludwig Christoph Heinrich Hölty, German poet (1 September 1776)

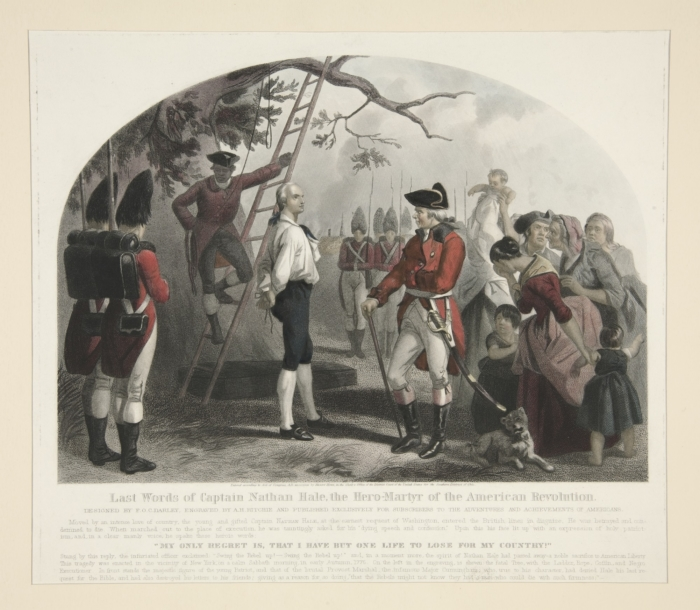
Last Words of Nathan Hale by Alexander Hay Ritchie.

"I only regret that I have but one life to give for my country." (Note: Also reported as, "I only regret that I have but one life to lose for my country." See Nathan Hale#Impact.)
— Nathan Hale, American soldier and spy (22 September 1776), before being hanged by the British for his involvement in the American Revolutionary War

"Come to me."
— William Dodd, English Anglican clergyman and man of letters (27 June 1777), to his executioner prior to hanging for forgery. He then whispered something unknown to the executioner.

"My friend, the artery ceases to beat." (Note: Also reported "Now the artery ceases to beat", and as "It's beating—beating—beating—it's stopped.")
— Albrecht von Haller, Swiss anatomist and physiologist (12 December 1777), to his friend Dr. Rosselet

"Bring me a chair; carry me forward; and there the surgeon will dress my wound."
— Nicholas Biddle, Continental Navy captain (7 March 1778), wounded in battle between USS Randolph and HMS Yarmouth. While the surgeon was treating Biddle, the Randolph exploded, killing all but four crewmembers.

"Now is not the time for making new enemies." (Note: This is disputed, albeit widely considered his last words. Last words also reported as, "The flames already?" on seeing a lamp beside his bed, as "Do let me die in peace" and as "For the love of God, don't mention that Man—allow me to die in peace!" (at the mention of Jesus), among other versions.)
— Voltaire, French writer (30 May 1778), when asked by a priest to renounce Satan before his death

"Throw up the window that I may see once more the magnificent scene of nature."
— Jean-Jacques Rousseau, Genevan philosopher, writer and composer (2 July 1778)

"No mortal man can live after the glories which God has manifested to my soul."
— Augustus Toplady, Anglican cleric and hymn writer, author of "Rock of Ages" (11 August 1778)

"I know that my Redeemer liveth."
— Anne Steele, English Baptist hymn writer and essayist (11 November 1778), quoting Job 19:25

"Oh, dear!" (Note: Also reported as, "My dear!")
— David Garrick, English actor, playwright, theatre manager and producer (20 January 1779)

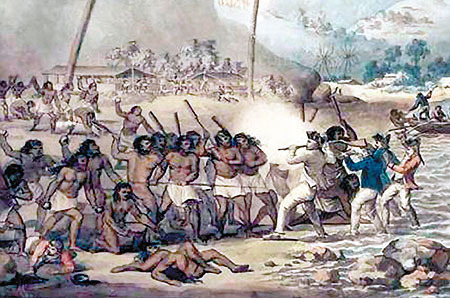
Death of James Cook in battle with Hawaiians.

"Take me to the boats."
— James Cook, British explorer and Royal Navy captain (14 February 1779), after being mortally wounded by a native Hawaiian

"Never fear; if you will but have patience I don't doubt we shall get through; but take care how you ever get in such a scrape again."
— Sir Francis Bernard, 1st Baronet, British colonial administrator (16 June 1779), dying after epileptic seizure

== 1780–1789 ==
"I thank you, sir, for your generous sympathy, but I die the death I always prayed for, the death of a soldier fighting for the rights of man."
— Baron Johann de Kalb, officer in the American War of Independence (16 August 1780), speaking to a British officer after being mortally wounded and captured at the Battle of Camden

"I pray you to bear me witness that I meet my fate like a brave man. It will be but a momentary pang." (Note: Also reported as, "All I request of you, gentlemen, is that you will bear witness to the world that I die like a brave man. It will be but a momentary pang" and as "Must I die in this manner?")
— John André, British Army officer (2 October 1780), prior to being hanged as a spy by the Continental Army

"No, but comfortable enough to die." (Note: Also reported as, "I do not sleep; I wish to meet death awake.")
— Maria Theresa, Archduchess of Austria and Queen of Hungary and Croatia (29 November 1780), when her son said, "Your Majesty cannot be comfortable like that"

"I did, sir, but you do now."
— William Ledyard, American soldier, lieutenant colonel in the Connecticut militia (6 September 1781), surrendering Fort Griswold during the Battle of Groton Heights. The British officer to whom Ledyard gave his sword in surrender immediately killed him with it.

"We will endeavor to crawl to this line; we will completely wet the powder with our blood: thus will we, with the life that remains in us, save the fort and the magazine, and perhaps a few of our comrades who are only wounded!"
— William Hotman, American soldier (6 September 1781), wounded at the Battle of Groton Heights, explaining to a friend how he would prevent the British from igniting a line of powder from the magazine of Fort Griswold (Note: The date of the battle is incorrectly given by Marvin as 20 October 1781, quoting from Hotman's tombstone.)

"I die but will return tomorrow as thousand thousands"
("Nayawa jiwtxa nayjarusti waranqa waranqanakawa kutanipxa.")
— Túpac Katari, Aymara revolutionary (15 April 1781), prior to his execution by quartering.

"I offer to Thee, O Lord, Thy own Son, who already has given the pledge of love, inclosed in this thin emblem; turn on Him thine eyes; oh! behold whom I offer to Thee and then desist, O Lord! if thou canst desist from mercy."
("T'offro il tuo proprio Figlio, / Che già d'amore in pegno, / Racchiuso in picciol segno / Si volle a noi donar. / A lui rivolgi il ciglio. / Guardo chi t'offro, e poi / Lasci, Signor, se vuoi, / Lascia di perdonar.")
— Pietro Metastasio, Italian poet and librettist (12 April 1782), after receiving Viaticum.

"Pray [to] God for me!"
("Bed Gud för mig!")
— Louise Ulrica, Queen of Sweden (16 July 1782)

"Charge!"
— John Laurens, American soldier, statesman and abolitionist (27 August 1782), prior to death at the Battle of the Combahee River

"Stand by me, my brave grenadiers."
— Charles Lee, Continental Army general (2 October 1782), dying of fever in a Philadelphia tavern

"If I had strength to hold a pen, I would write down how easy and pleasant a thing it is to die."
— William Hunter, Scottish anatomist and physician (30 March 1783)

"I die."
— Leonhard Euler, Swiss mathematician and scientist (18 September 1783)

"We have lived long, in love and peace."
— Anthony Benezet, French-American abolitionist and educator (3 May 1784), to his wife

"The first step towards philosophy is incredulity." (Note: Also reported as, "What possible harm could it do to me?" ("Mais quel diable de mal veux-te que cela me fosse?") (to his wife, who had said he should not eat an apricot).)
— Denis Diderot, French philosopher (31 July 1784)

"God bless you, my dear." (Note: Also reported as, "I am dying now.")
— Samuel Johnson, English writer (13 December 1784), to Miss Morris, a young woman

"I am tired of ruling over slaves." (Note: Also reported as, "La montagne est passée, nous irons mieux" (in delirium).)
("Ich bin es müde, über Sklaven zu herrschen.")
— Frederick the Great, king of Prussia (17 August 1786)

"Je craîndrais de ne pas mépriser assez la vie — some dreams of humanity qui me déchirent plutôt qu'ils me consolent..." (Note: In French and English.)
— José Anastácio da Cunha, Portuguese mathematician and poet (1 January 1787), recorded by Domingos de Sousa Coutinho

"My Christ."
— John Brown of Haddington, Scottish minister and author (19 June 1787)

"If you wait a little, I shall be able to tell you from personal experience."
— Christoph Willibald Gluck, composer of Italian and French opera (15 November 1787), when asked whether a tenor or a bass should sing the role of Christ in The Last Judgement

"I shall be satisfied with Thy likeness— satisfied, satisfied!"
— Charles Wesley, English Methodist leader and hymn writer (29 March 1788)

"We are all going to Heaven, and van Dyke is of the company."
— Thomas Gainsborough, English painter (2 August 1788)

"I will lie down on the couch; I can sleep, and after that I shall be entirely recovered."
— Elizabeth Pierrepont, Duchess of Kingston-upon-Hull, English noble and courtier (26 August 1788)

"Waiting, are they? Waiting, are they? Well, God damn 'em, let 'em wait!"
— Ethan Allen, American patriot and militia general (12 February 1789), on being told the angels were waiting for him

== 1790–1800 ==
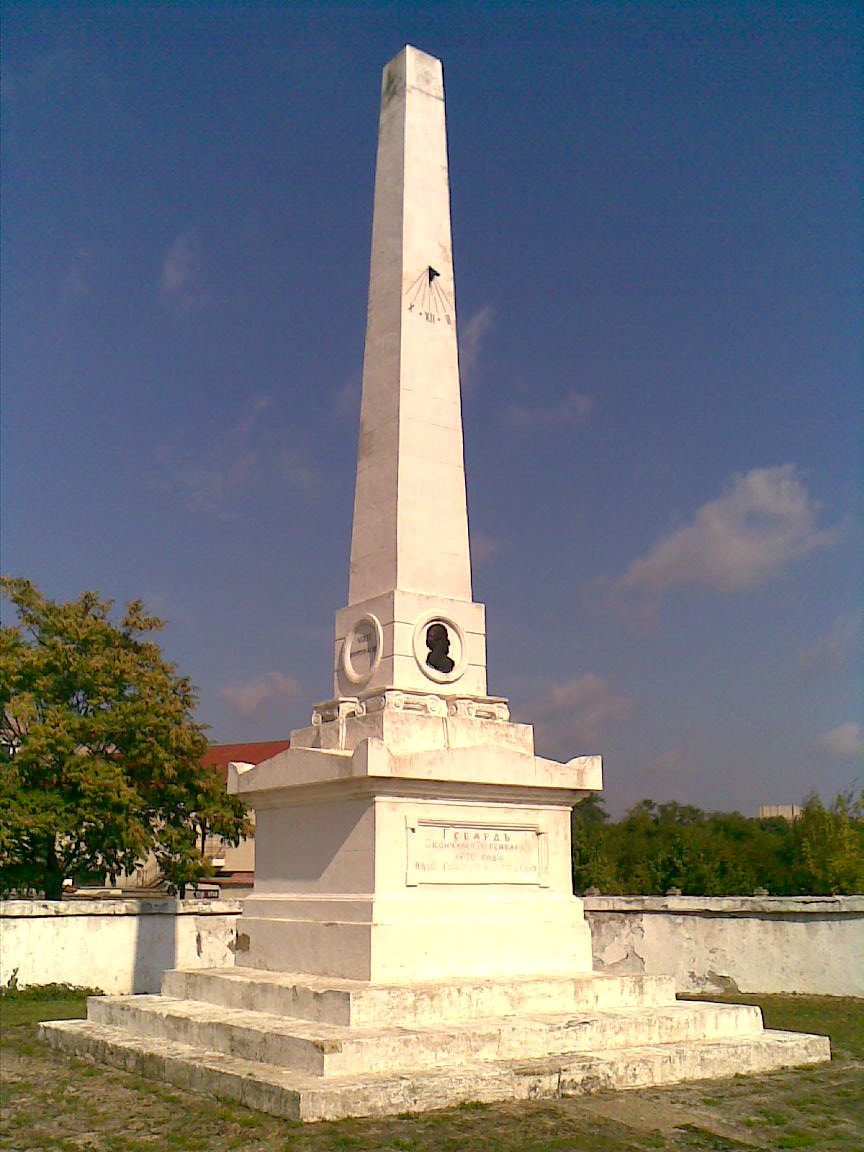
Memorial to John Howard in Kherson.

"Suffer no pomp at my funeral, nor monumental inscription where I am laid. Lay me quietly in the earth and put a sun-dial over my grave, and let me be forgotten." (Note: Also reported as, "Give me no monument, but lay me quietly in the earth; place a sun-dial over my grave, and let me be forgotten.")
— John Howard, English philanthropist and prison reformer (20 January 1790), dying of typhus contracted on a prison visit in Kherson

"I wish I had the power of writing, for then I would describe to you how pleasant a thing it is to die."
— William Cullen, Scottish physician, chemist and agriculturalist (5 February 1790)

"I see that you have made three spelling mistakes."
— Thomas de Mahy, Marquis de Favras (19 February 1790), upon reading his death warrant

"Let my epitaph be, 'Here lies Joseph, who was unsuccessful in all his undertakings.'"
— Joseph II, Holy Roman Emperor (20 February 1790)

"I will tell them for ever that Jesus is precious."
— Joseph Bellamy, American Congregationalist pastor, author, educator and theologian (6 March 1790), when asked what he would do in Hell if God sent him there

"A dying man can do nothing easy."
— Benjamin Franklin, American statesman and scientist (17 April 1790), complaining about the difficulty of assuming a more comfortable position on his deathbed

"I believe we shall adjourn this meeting to another place."
— Adam Smith, Scottish economist (17 July 1790)

"I desire to be dissected for the benefit of my fellow men."
("Ich will seciret sein zum Besten meiner Mitmenschen.")
— Johann Bernhard Basedow, German educational reformer, teacher and writer (25 July 1790)

"The best of all is, God is with us."
— John Wesley, English cleric and theologian, founder of Methodism (2 March 1791)

"Let me die to the sound of delicious music." (Note: Also reported as, "Are those already the Achilles' funeral?" and as "Let me fall asleep to the sound of delicious music." Brewer's points out the similarity to the last words of Leopold I, Holy Roman Emperor (ibid.).)
— Honoré Gabriel Riqueti, comte de Mirabeau (2 April 1791)

"My work is done; I have nothing to do but to go to my Father."
— Selina Hastings, Countess of Huntingdon, English religious leader (17 June 1791)

"The taste of death is upon my lips... I feel something, that is not of this earth." (Note: Also reported as, "Did I not say that I was writing the Requiem for myself?" (to Franz Xaver Süssmayr), as "Let me hear those notes so long my solace and delight", and as "You spoke of a refreshment, Emilie; take my last notes, and let me hear once more my solace and delight.")
— Wolfgang Amadeus Mozart, Austrian composer (5 December 1791)

"I have been fortunate in long good health and constant success, and I ought not to complain. I know that all things on earth must have an end, and now I am come to mine."
— Joshua Reynolds, English painter (23 February 1792)

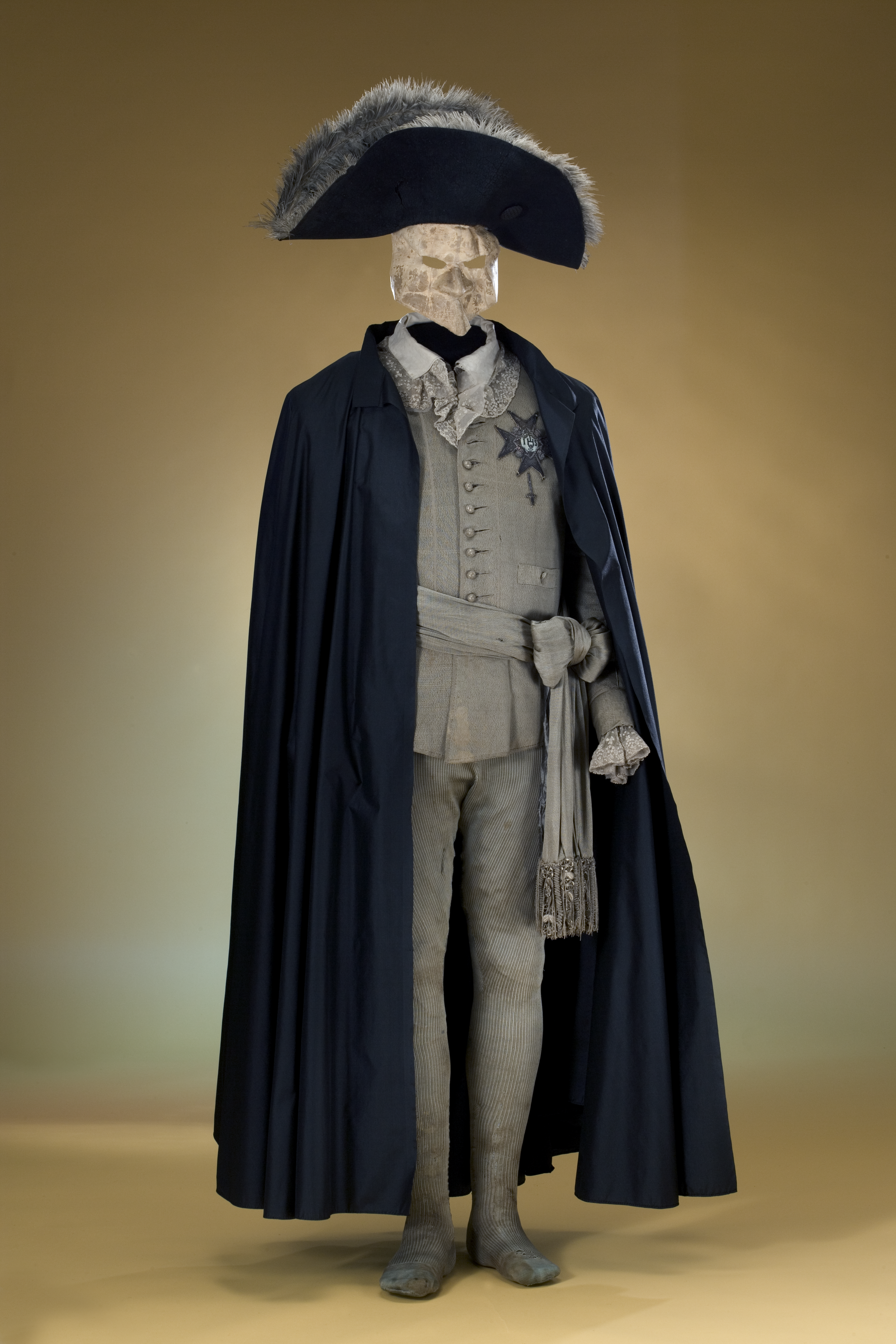
The costume Gustav III wore to the masquerade ball.

"I feel sleepy, and a moment of rest would do me good."
("Jag känner mig sömnig, och ett ögonblicks vila skulle göra mig gott.")
— Gustav III, King of Sweden (29 March 1792) 13 days after being shot in the back at a masquerade

"Fi horreur!" (Note: Also reported as, "I am lost!")
(Roughly "To hell with fear!").
— Marie Thérèse Louise of Savoy, Princesse de Lamballe, confidante of Marie Antoinette (3 September 1792), upon seeing bloody corpses in the courtyard where she was then murdered

"I am cold."
("J'ai froid.")
— Louis-Michel le Peletier, marquis de Saint-Fargeau, French politician (20 January 1793), assassinated because he voted in favor of Louis XVI's execution the following day

"Frenchmen, I die guiltless of the crimes imputed to me. Pray God my blood fall not on France!" (Note: Also reported as, "Gentlemen, I am innocent of everything of which I am accused. I hope that my blood may cement the good fortune of the French." and as "Je meurs innocent de tous les crimes qu'on m'impute. Je pardonne aux auteurs de ma mort, et je prie Dieu que le sang que vous allez répandre ne retombe jamais su la France... Puisse mon sang cimenter votre bonheur!" ("I die innocent of all the crimes laid to my charge. I forgive the authors of my death, and I pray God that the blood which you are about to shed may never fall on France.... May my blood cement your happiness!")
("Messieurs, je suis innocent de tout ce dont on m'inculpe. Je souhaite que mon sang que vous allez répandre ne retombe jamais sur la France.")
— Louis XVI, king of France (21 January 1793), speaking to his executioners prior to his execution by guillotine

"Help! help me, my dear!"
("Aidez-moi, ma chère amie!")
— Jean-Paul Marat (13 July 1793), to his wife, after being stabbed by Charlotte Corday

"One man have I slain to save a hundred thousand." (Note: Also reported as, "This is the toilette of death, arranged by somewhat rude hands, but it leads to immortality" (described as her last words "of which we can be certain").)
— Charlotte Corday (17 July 1793), prior to execution by guillotine

"I shall look forward to a pleasant time."
— John Hancock, American merchant, statesman and Patriot (8 October 1793)

"Pardon me, sir. I did not do it on purpose." (Note: Also reported as, "Farewell, my children, for ever. I am going to your father.")
("Pardonnez-moi, monsieur. Je ne l'ai pas fait exprès.")
— Marie Antoinette, queen of France (16 October 1793), apologizing to her executioner for stepping on his foot prior to her execution by guillotine

"Pardon for the prisoners, Bonchamps commands it!"
("Grâce aux, prisonniers, Bonchamps l'ordonne!")
— Charles de Bonchamps, French politician and leader of the Royalist Vendéan insurrection (18 October 1793), mortally wounded at the Second Battle of Cholet. He was ordering the pardon of five thousand Republican prisoners whom his troops intended to kill.

"Rather death than slavery, is the motto of the French."
("Plûtot la mort que l'esclavage, C'est la devise des Français.")
— Jacques Pierre Brissot, French abolitionist and leading member of the Girondins (31 October 1793), singing these words along with 21 other Girondins before their execution

"They applauded me!"
("Ils m'applaudirent!")
— Louis Philippe II, Duke of Orléans (6 November 1793), remembering his former acclaim on the way to the guillotine

"Oh Liberty, what crimes are committed in thy name!" (Note: Also reported as, "Ah! liberté, comme on t'a jouée!" ("Ah! liberty, how they have cheated thee!"))
("O Liberté, que de crimes on commet en ton nom!")
— Madame Roland, French revolutionary and writer (8 November 1793), prior to execution by guillotine

"Yes my friend, but it's from the cold." (Note: Also reported as, "Je tremble, mais c'est de froid" ("I tremble but it is from the cold") and as "J'ai froid" ("I am cold").)
("Oui mon ami, mais c'est de froid.")
— Jean Sylvain Bailly, French astronomer, mathematician and politician (12 November 1793), to a heckler who asked if he was trembling as he approached the guillotine

"Better to suffer and to die than to lose one shade of my moral and political character." (Note: Also reported as, "This then is my reward?" and as "Voilà donc le prix tout de ce que j'ai fait pour la liberté" ("This then is the price of what I have done for liberty").)
— Antoine Barnave, French politician (29 November 1793), prior to execution by guillotine

"I have been unfaithful to God, to my Order, to my King; I die full of faith and repentance."
("J'ai été infidèle à mon Dieu, à mon Ordre, et à mon Roi; je meurs plein de foi et de repentir.")
— Armand Louis de Gontaut, French soldier and politician (31 December 1793), prior to execution by guillotine

"My God! My God!" (Note: Also reported as, "Pourquoi est ce que vous me quittez" (to his valet).)
("Mon Dieu! Mon Dieu!")
— Edward Gibbon, English historian and Member of Parliament (16 January 1794)

"Behold, then, the recompense reserved for the first apostle of liberty."
— Camille Desmoulins, French journalist and politician (5 April 1794), looking at the axe prior to execution by guillotine

"Show my head to the people. It is worth seeing." (Note: Also reported as, "I leave it all in a frightful welter. Not a man of them has an idea of government. Robespierre will follow me; he is dragged down by me. Ah! better be a poor fisherman than meddle with the government of men.")
("Tu montreras ma tête au peuple. Elle en vaut la peine.")
— Georges Danton, leading figure in the French Revolution (5 April 1794), prior to execution by guillotine

"Hold your tongue! your wretched chatter disgusts me." (Note: Also reported as, "Oh! Oh! voilà qui s'apelle un mauvais présage. Un Romain à ma place serait rentré" ("Oh! Oh! that's what is called a bad omen. A Roman in my place would have gone in again") (when he stumbled while leaving prison to get into the tumbrel that would take him to the guillotine).)
— Guillaume-Chrétien de Lamoignon de Malesherbes, French statesman and government minister, defense counsel of Louis XVI (22 April 1794), to the priest prior to his execution by guillotine

"I pray you, gentlemen, in the name of modesty, suffer me to cover my bosom." (Note: Also reported as, "Je me nomme Élisabeth de France sœur du roi" ("My name is Elisabeth of France, sister of the King").)
("Au nom de votre mère, monsieur, couvrez-moi.")
— Élisabeth of France, sister of Louis XVI (10 May 1794), when her fichu fell from her neck prior to her execution by guillotine

"When I was sixty years of age, I mounted the breach for my king; and now that I am eighty-four [sic] I shall not want courage to mount the scaffold for my God."
— Philippe de Noailles, duc de Mouchy (27 June 1794), prior to execution by guillotine

"Yet I had something there!" (Note: Also reported as, "Comme un dernier rayon, comme un derniere zéphyre / Anime la fin d'un beau jour; / Au pied de l'échefaud j'essaie encore ma lyre, / Peut-être est ce bientôt mon tour; / Peut-être avant que l'heure en cercle promenée / Ait posé sur l'émail brillant, / Dans les soixante pas où sa route est bornée, / Son pied sonore et vigilant, / Le sommeil du tombeau pressera me paupière —")
("Pourtant, j'avais quelque chose là!")
— André Chénier, French poet (25 July 1794), to his friend and fellow poet Jean-Antoine Roucher prior to their executions by guillotine

"Cowards! Why did you not defend him?"
— Maximilien Robespierre, French lawyer and statesman (28 July 1794), when blamed for the death of Georges Danton

"His praise, ye winds, that from four quarters blow, / Blow soft or loud; and wave your tops, ye pines, / With every plant, in sign of worship, wave."
— Richard Burke Jr., English barrister and Member of Parliament (2 August 1794), quoting the Morning Hymn from Paradise Lost to his father, Edmund Burke; he then died in his father's arms

"Don't be alarmed, my son."
— Friedrich Wilhelm von Steuben, Prussian and American military officer (28 November 1794)

"Thank God since I came to man's estate, I have never intentionally done wrong to anyone."
— Francis Marion, American military officer (27 February 1795). Marion was an enslaver who committed wartime atrocities.

"I have something to tell you..."
— Louis XVII, pretender to the French throne (8 June 1795), dying in prison custody at the age of 10

"Holy, holy, holy, blessed Lord Jesus! to Thee be endless praise!"
— William Romaine, evangelical divine of the Church of England (26 July 1795)

"I am dying; leave me alone."
— Johann Georg Ritter von Zimmermann, Swiss philosophical writer, naturalist and physician (7 October 1795)

"Must I leave it unfinished?"
— Adam Naruszewicz, Polish-Lithuanian bishop and author (8 July 1796), referring to his History of Poland

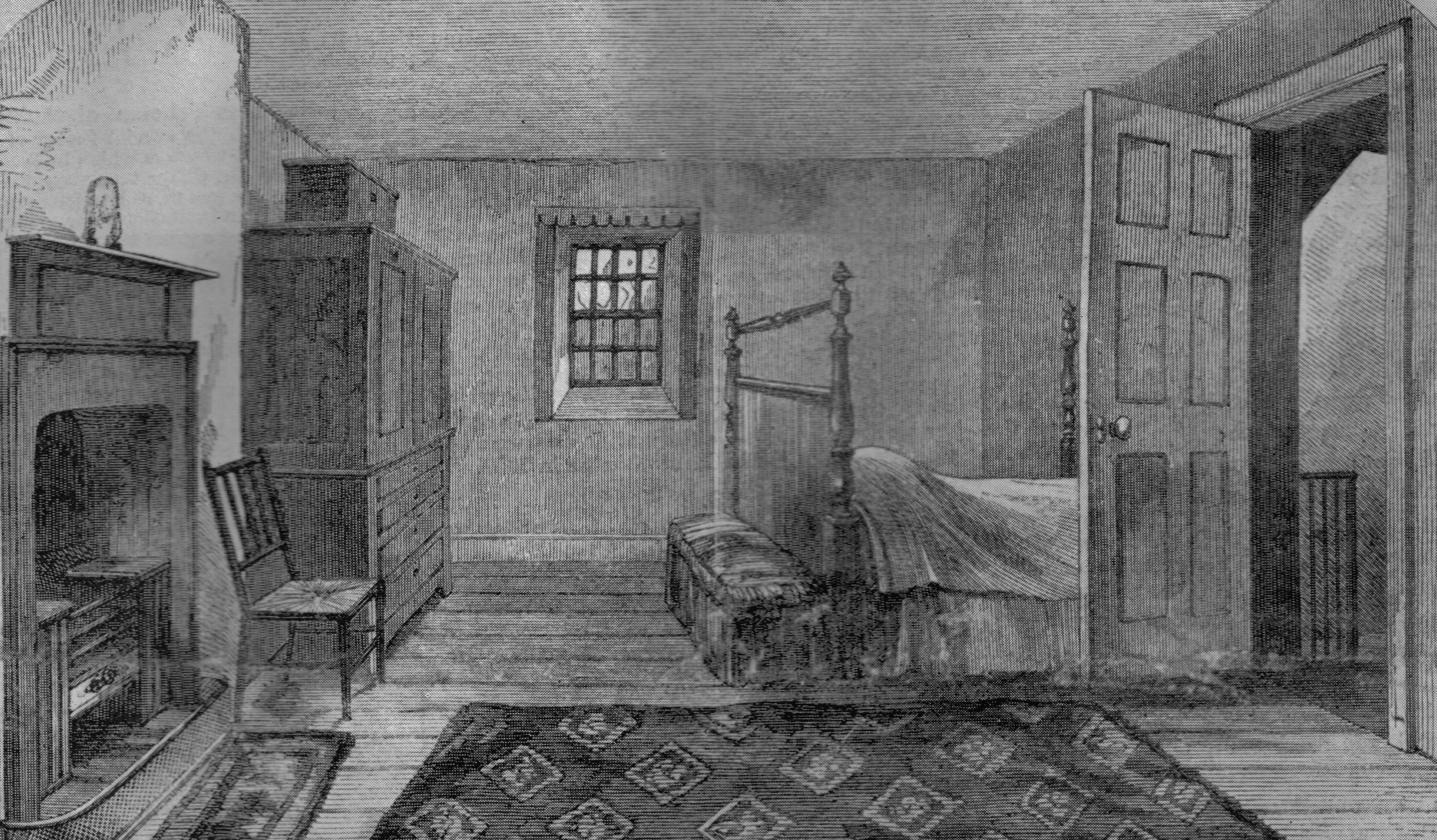
The death room of Robert Burns.

"John, don't let the awkward squad fire over me." (Note: Also reported as, "Don't let that awkward squad fire over my grave." Whether these were Burns' very last words is disputed.)
— Robert Burns, Scottish poet (21 July 1796), referring to a Dumfries militia to which he belonged

"General, why do you shed tears? I am happy to die for my country."
("Général, pourquoi versez-vous des larmes? Je suis hereux de mourir pour mon pays.")
— François Séverin Marceau, French general of the Revolutionary Wars (21 September 1796), to General Jean-Baptiste Jourdan when mortally wounded at the Battle of Limburg (1796)

"Water."
— Catherine the Great, empress of Russia (17 November [O.S. 6 November] 1796)

"I thank you for all your faithful services; God bless you."
— William Bromley Cadogan, English clergyman (1797), to a longtime servant

"God bless you."
— Edmund Burke, Irish statesman and philosopher (9 July 1797)

"I know what you are thinking of, but I have nothing to communicate on the subject of religion."
— Mary Wollstonecraft, English writer and feminist philosopher (10 September 1797), to her husband, William Godwin, while dying from the effects of giving birth to Mary Shelley

"What an idle piece of ceremony this buttoning and unbuttoning is to me, now."
— Richard Brocklesby, English physician (11 December 1797), as his servants dressed him for bed

"Had it pleased my Lord to spare me longer I should have been glad. I should then have been able to speak yet a word to the sick and poor; but His will be done! May He, in mercy, but receive me! Into Thy hands I commend my spirit; Thou has redeemed me, O Thou faithful God."
— Christian Friedrich Schwarz, German Lutheran missionary to India (13 February 1798)

"I have lived as a philosopher. I die as a Christian."
— Giacomo Casanova, Italian adventurer and author (4 June 1798)

"There is another and a better world." (Note: Whether these were Palmer's last words is questionable.)
— John Palmer, English actor (2 August 1798), performing on stage in The Stranger

"I can yet find words to thank you, sir; it is the most welcome news you could give me. What should I wish to live for?"
— Wolfe Tone, Irish revolutionary (19 November 1798), when told a wound in his throat would reopen and cause him to bleed to death if he spoke. Tone died in prison under unclear circumstances (possibly suicide) while awaiting execution by hanging.

"This is a beautiful world."
— Johann Reinhold Forster, Reformed (Calvinist) pastor and naturalist (9 December 1798)

"Doctor, I wish you to observe how real and beneficial the religion of Christ is to a man about to die.... I am, however, much consoled by reflecting that the religion of Christ has, from its first appearance in the world, been attacked in vain by all the wits, philosophers, and wise ones, aided by every power of man, and its triumphs have been complete." (Note: Also reported as, "I trust in the mercy of God, it is not now too late.")
— Patrick Henry, American attorney, politician and orator (6 June 1799)

"Here I am finally. Here I am at the end of the tumultuous career that, whatever my repugnance, I have kept to for so long. My troubles will soon be over and my true happiness is coming, since I have all confidence in the mercy of my God. I willingly leave this world where I have been thought happy in that I have had public admiration, been respected by great, esteemed kings. I can't say that I regret all these honors—it's just that they add up to vanity and trouble."
— Pierre Pigneau de Behaine, French Roman Catholic priest and missionary in Vietnam (9 October 1799)

"I die hard, but I am not afraid to go... I am just going. Have me decently buried, and do not let my body be put into the vault in less than two days after I am dead. Do you understand me? 'Tis well."
— George Washington, president of the United States (14 December 1799), to Dr. James Craik and his personal secretary, Tobias Lear

"My post is here. I can't leave it until ordered."
— James C. Jarvis, United States Navy midshipman (2 February 1800), refusing to leave the rigging of USS Constellation during a battle with French frigate La Vengeance. The mainmast toppled and Jarvis was swept over the side. He was 13 years old.

"What can it signify?"
— William Cowper, English poet and hymnodist (25 April 1800), to an attendant who offered him refreshments

"There is yet time to win another battle!"
— Louis Desaix, French general (14 June 1800), prior to death in the French Revolutionary Wars
