= List of American flag officers killed during the American Revolutionary War =

Over the course of the American Revolutionary War, several high ranking American officers were killed. Note that until 1857, Captain was the highest rank in the United States Navy.

== List ==
Name	Rank	Command	Date	Notes
Joseph Warren	Major General	Commander of American forces on Bunker Hill	17 June 1775	Killed during the Battle of Bunker Hill.
Richard Montgomery	Major General		31 December 1775	Killed during the Battle of Quebec.
John Thomas	Major General		2 January 1776	Died of smallpox during the retreat after the failed Invasion of Quebec.
Hugh Mercer	Brigadier General	Mercer's Brigade	12 January 1777	Died of wounds received during the Battle of Princeton.
Nicholas Herkimer	Brigadier General	Tryon County militia	16 August 1777	Died of wounds received during the Battle of Oriskany.
Philippe Charles Tronson du Coudray	Major General	Commander of the Continental Army's artillery and engineering corps	11 September 1777	Drowned during a ferry crossing of the Schuylkill River after his horse got spooked and jumped off of the ferry while he was entangled in his stirrups.
Lambert Wickes	Captain	USS Reprisal	1 October 1777	Killed by a Nor'easter.
Nicholas Biddle	Captain	USS Randolph	7 March 1778	Killed during the Battle off Barbados.
Casimir Pulaski	Brigadier General	Pulaski's Legion	11 October 1779	Died of wounds received during the Siege of Savannah.
Johann de Kalb	Major General		19 August 1780	Died of wounds received during the Battle of Camden.
Jonathan Greeley	Captain	Privateer ship Speedwell	1781	Killed after his ship scuttled by a British frigate off the coast of Marblehead, Massachusetts.
William Lee Davidson	Brigadier General	Salisbury District Brigade	1 February 1781	Killed during the Battle of Cowan's Ford.
David Ropes	Captain	Privateer ship Jack	29 May 1782	Killed during the Second Battle off Halifax
