= USS Biddle =

Four ships of the United States Navy have been named USS Biddle, in honor of Captain Nicholas Biddle.

- USS Biddle (TB-26) was a torpedo boat in service from 1901 to 1919.
- USS Biddle (DD-151) was a destroyer commissioned 1918 and in use until 1945.
- USS Biddle (DDG-5) was a guided missile destroyer commissioned in 1962 and renamed Claude V. Ricketts in 1964.
- USS Biddle (CG-34) was a guided missile cruiser in service from 1967 to 1993. (Commissioned as DLG-34; Reclassified 30 June 1975 as CG-34)

One ship of the United States Navy has been named USS Biddle, in honor of Major General William P. Biddle, USMC.

- USS William P. Biddle (APA-8) was an attack transport in service from 1941 to 1946.
