= USS Biddle (DD-151) =

Wickes-class destroyer

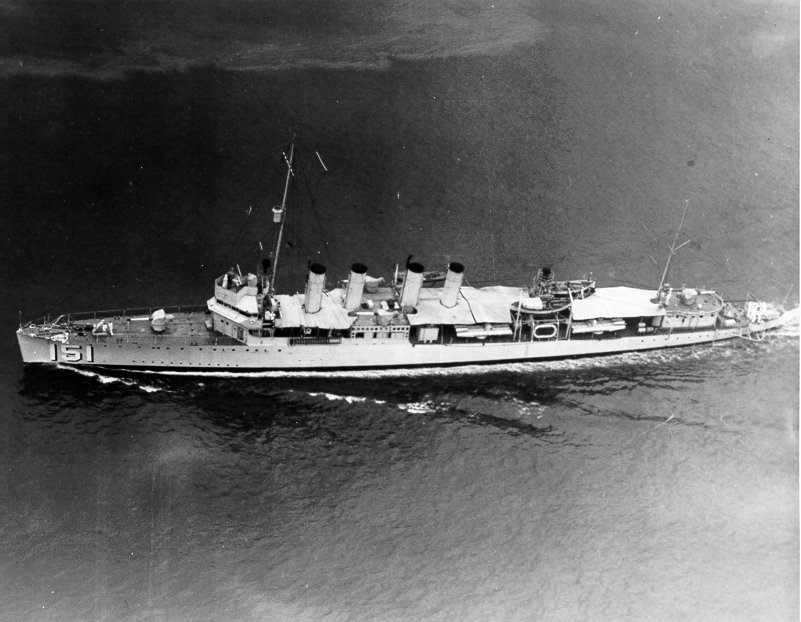
- USS Biddle underway

History

United States
- Name: Biddle
- Builder: William Cramp & Sons, Philadelphia
- Cost: $1,449,111.62 (hull and machinery)
- Yard number: 466
- Laid down: 22 April 1918
- Launched: 3 October 1918
- Commissioned: 22 April 1919
- Decommissioned: 20 June 1922
- Recommissioned: 16 October 1939
- Decommissioned: 5 October 1945
- Reclassified: AG-114, 30 June 1945
- Stricken: 24 October 1945
- Fate: Sold for scrapping 3 December 1946

General characteristics
- Class & type: Wickes-class destroyer
- Displacement: 1,154 tons
- Length: 314 ft 5 in (95.8 m)
- Beam: 31 ft 8 in (9.7 m)
- Draft: 9 ft 0 in (2.7 m)
- Speed: 35 knots (65 km/h)
- Complement: 159 officers and enlisted
- Armament: 4 × 4 in (102 mm) guns; 2 × 3 in (76 mm) guns; 12 × 21 in (533 mm) torpedo tubes

USS Biddle (DD-151) was a Wickes-class destroyer in the United States Navy during World War II, later reclassified AG-114. She was the second ship named for Captain Nicholas Biddle.

== Design ==
The Wickes class was an improved derivative of the previous Caldwell-class destroyers, with a higher speed of 35 kn (40 mph; 65 km/h) specified in order to match the Lexington-class battlecruisers and Omaha-class cruisers authorized under the Naval Act of 1916. Fifty Wickes-class destroyers were authorized under the 1916 act, but with World War I demonstrating the need for large numbers of destroyers for anti-submarine operations, further orders were placed, with a total of 111 Wickes and 156 of the very similar Clemson-class destroyers finally built. Two different designs to meet the specifications were drawn up by Bethlehem Steel (used by the Fore River and Union Iron Works subsidiary shipyards of Bethlehem) and by Bath Iron Works (used by all other shipyards and unofficially known as the 'Liberty' design). The two designs differed mainly in the machinery used.

The ships were 314 ft 4 in (95.81 m) long overall and 310 ft 0 in (94.49 m) at the waterline, with a beam of 30 ft 11 1/2 in (9.44 m) and a draft of 9 ft 10 1/2 in (3.01 m) at full load, with a similar flush-decked hull form to that used in the Caldwell class. Displacement of the Cramp-built Wickes-class ships was 1,154 long tons (1,173 t) normal and 1,247 long tons (1,267 t) full load. Four White-Forster water-tube boilers fed steam to geared sets of Parsons steam turbines, and drove two propeller shafts. The machinery had a designed power of 26,000 shp (19,000 kW). Performance of the Cramp-built ships exceeded contractual requirements for range and speed. Biddle reached a speed of 35.12 knots (40.42 mph; 65.04 km/h) on sea trials.

Biddle had a main gun armament of four 4-inch (102 mm) guns in single mounts, with it being planned to mount two 1-pounder autocannon for anti-aircraft defense, but there was a shortage of these guns, and many ships of the class were fitted with two 3-inch/23-caliber gun instead. (Note: Biddle was listed as having two 3-inch anti-aircraft guns in 1920.) Biddle only had a single 3-inch gun in 1935. Torpedo armament consisted of twelve 21-inch torpedo tubes in four triple mounts. The ship had a crew of 122 officers and other ranks in 1920. This had increased to 149 by 1945.

During World War II, the ship was re-armed to improve abilities as an escort. Two banks of torpedo tubes were removed to allow six 20 mm Oerlikon cannon and a heavier depth charge armament (six depth charge throwers) to be fitted. In addition, a boiler was removed to allow more fuel to be carried, increasing range, although reducing speed to about 25 kn (29 mph; 46 km/h).

== Construction and commissioning ==
Biddle was authorised on 4 March 1917 with the contract for her construction signed on 8 September 1917. The ship was laid down at William Cramp & Sons Ship and Engine Building Company, Philadelphia shipyard on 22 April 1918, and was launched on 3 October 1918, sponsored by Miss Elise B. Robinson, a great-great-grandniece of Captain Biddle. The ship was commissioned on 22 April 1919.

== Service history ==
Following her commissioning, Biddle made a cruise to the Mediterranean Sea. In February 1920, she assisted in the evacuation of Odessa, which was on the point of capture by the Red Army in the Russian Civil War. Biddle returned to New York on 1 July 1920. After assignment to Division 48, Atlantic Fleet, she carried out cruises along the east coast until decommissioned at Philadelphia Navy Yard on 20 June 1922. She remained laid up until recommissioned on 16 October 1939. Until November 1940 she served on patrol duty with Destroyer Division 66, Atlantic Squadron, and on training duty with Naval Reserve Officers Training Corps. She patrolled in the Caribbean Sea under orders of the Commandant, 15th Naval District (November 1940-May 1941) and then rejoined Destroyer Division 66 patrolling out of Key West, Florida.

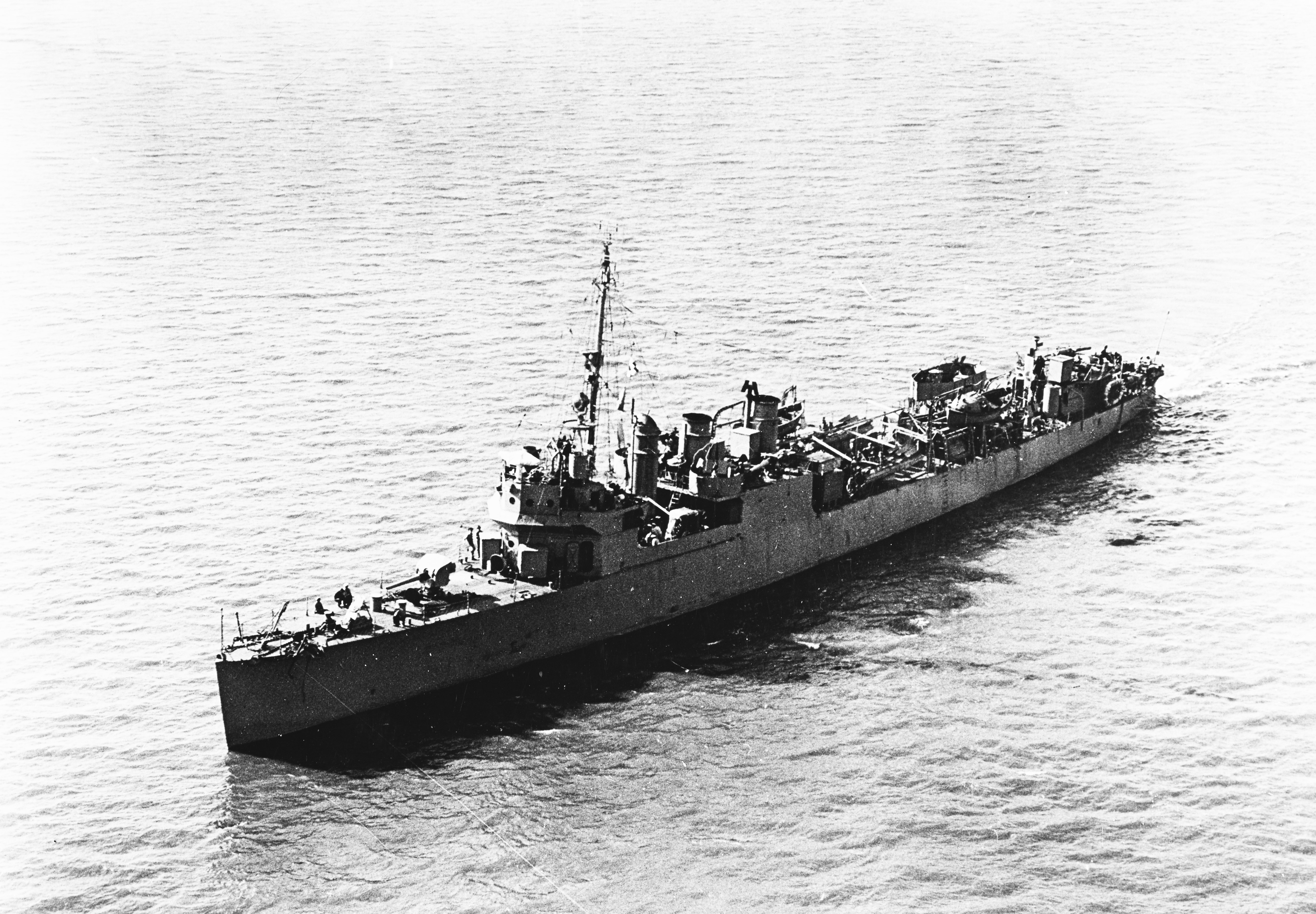
Biddle in 1942

Biddle spent March 1942-February 1945 on convoy duty in the Caribbean except for two short periods. On 5 August 1943, Biddle made Sonar contact with a submarine northwest of Trinidad and attacked with depth charges, but the submarine, the German U-615, escaped from Biddle's attacks by using a decoy, but was sunk after a series of sustained air attacks on 7 August. Biddle formed part of anti-submarine group TG 2.13 from 18 January 1944 to 27 February 1944 and escorted a convoy to North Africa from 24 March 1944 to 11 May 1944. During the latter mission, 11–12 April, while fighting off an air attack, she had seven men wounded by a strafing attack by a German plane. Biddle operated off the east coast, March–July 1945, on training exercises with motor torpedo boats. She was reclassified a miscellaneous auxiliary (AG-114) on 30 June 1945, and arrived at Boston Navy Yard on 15 July for conversion. Her conversion was completed just as the war with Japan ended and she remained at Boston until decommissioned on 5 October 1945. She was sold for scrap on 3 December 1946.

== Awards ==
Biddle received one battle star for her service with Convoy UGS-37.
