= Battle off Barbados =

1778 battle of the American Revolutionary War

- Part of the American Revolutionary War
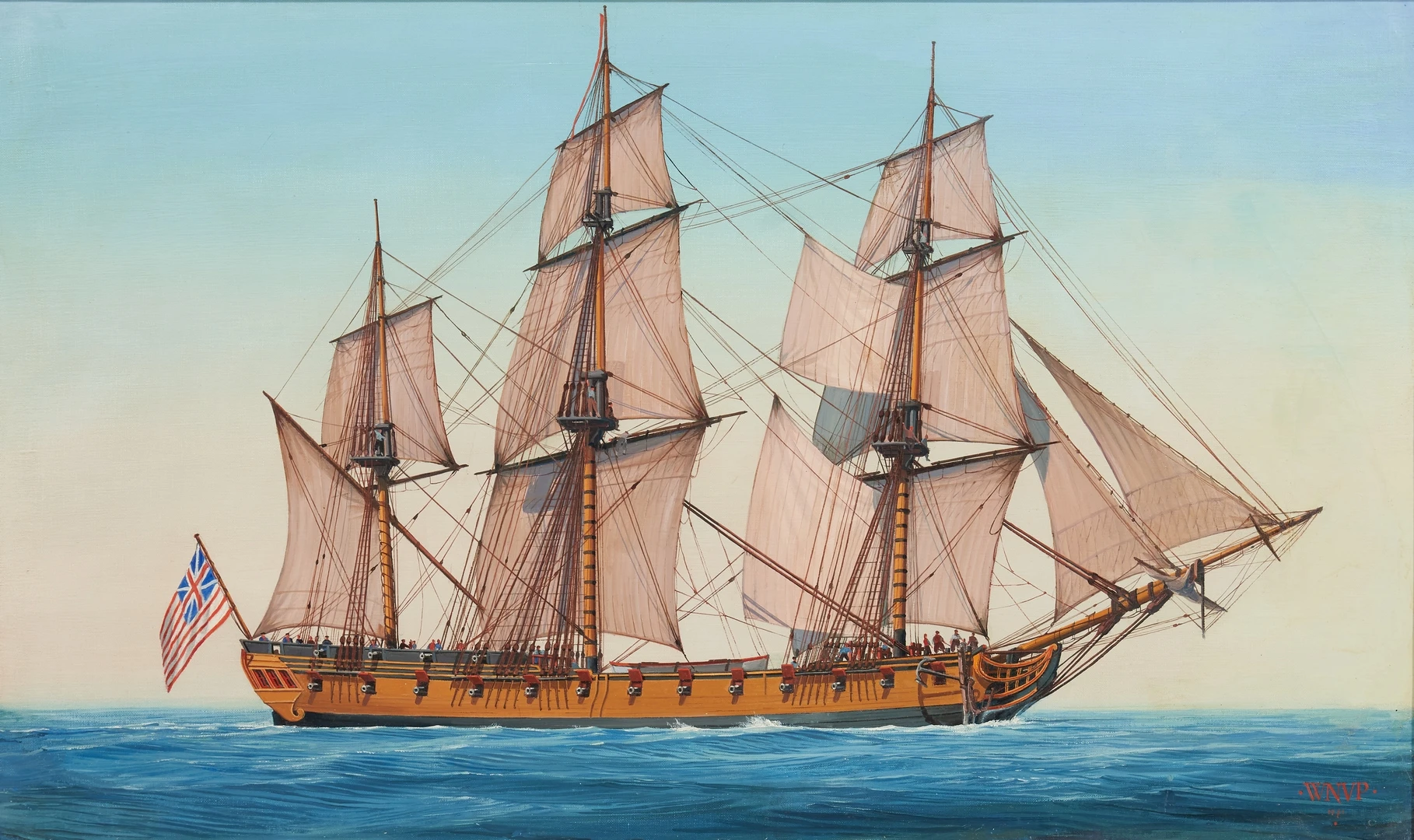
- USS Randolph, which was destroyed in the battle
Date	March 7, 1778
Location	Off Barbados, Caribbean Sea 13.187°N 59.457°W
Result	British victory

Belligerents
Great Britain	United States

Commanders and leaders
Nicholas Vincent	Nicholas Biddle †

Strength
1 ship of the line	1 frigate 1 brig

Casualties and losses
5 killed 12 wounded	311 killed 1 frigate destroyed

The Battle off Barbados was fought in March 1778 during the American Revolutionary War. While escorting a fleet of American ships in the West Indies, the frigate USS Randolph was attacked by the British ship-of-the-line HMS Yarmouth. The following action resulted in America's most costly naval defeat, in terms of human lives, until the sinking of USS Arizona in 1941.

== Background ==
Captain Nicholas Biddle commanded the thirty-six-gun USS Randolph, having received orders from John Rutledge to break the enemy blockade of Charleston, South Carolina where a large number of merchantmen were trapped. After breaking the blockade Biddle was to sail into the South Atlantic. Four other armed ships accompanied the Randolph in this mission: the General Moultrie, the Notre Dame, the Fair American and the Polly. However, after sailing out to meet the British off Charleston on February 14, the enemy was nowhere in sight, so the American fleet headed for the West Indies where Biddle would raid commerce.

On February 16, the fleet burned a British ship that had been dis-masted by a privateer, and on March 4, the Polly captured a small schooner that was added to the fleet as a tender. Three days after that, at about 5:30 pm, on March 7, 1778, the Americans were sailing off the eastern coast of Barbados when lookouts spotted a large ship to the windward. Captain Biddle assumed the vessel to be a man-o-war so he directed most of his ships to continue on while he remained behind with the Randolph and the eighteen-gun ship General Moultrie to engage the oncoming vessel.

== Battle ==
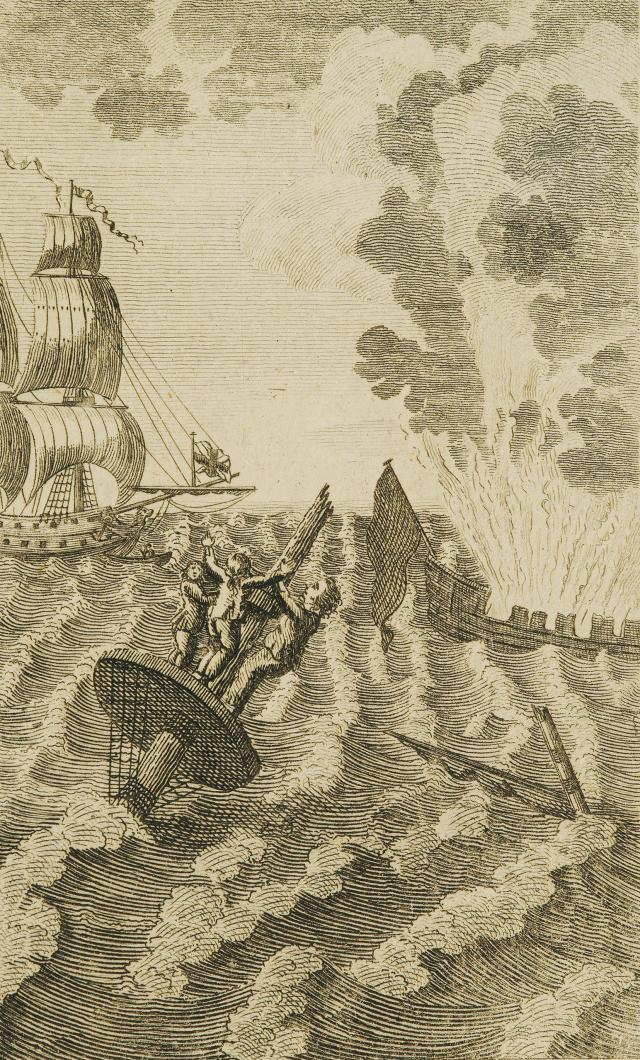
1789 illustration of Randolph's destruction

The British ship turned out to be the sixty-four-gun HMS Yarmouth under the command of Captain Nicholas Vincent. After a few hours of maneuvering, at about 9:00 pm, the Americans raised their colors and opened fire on the Yarmouth with a broadside. The British, in turn, responded and opened fire. This bloody battle raged on for twenty minutes. Captain Biddle was wounded early in the battle but continued to fight. It is thought that the shots that wounded him came from the General Moultrie, which accidentally struck the Randolph.

During the battle, a spark entered the Randolph's powder magazine, causing a large explosion that completely destroyed the frigate in an instant. The USS Randolph then sank with a loss of 311 men and only four survivors. Biddle went down with the ship.

According to Captain Hall of the Notre Dame, Biddle and his men heavily damaged the Yarmouth in the first twelve to fifteen minutes, while the American ships were still mostly unharmed. The Yarmouth lost her bowsprit and her topmasts, a portion of which fell down and damaged the poop deck. Another portion of the topmasts fell into the top-gallant sails and then onto the cap. Five British sailors were killed and another twelve men received wounds.

== Aftermath ==
After sinking the Randolph, Captain Vincent attempted to pursue the other American ships, to no avail, as they dispersed in separate ways. Damage to the Yarmouth's sail also gave the Americans the advantage to slip away. The four surviving Americans were not captured until five days later; HMS Yarmouth came across them on March 12 while she was chasing a ship west. The four survivors were found clinging to wreckage and had survived by sucking rain water out of a blanket. The death of Captain Biddle was considered a severe blow to the Continental Navy. Biddle was well respected and regarded as a professional sailor and a strong leader.

== Bibliography ==
- Allen, Gardner W. (1913). A naval history of the American Revolution, Volume 1. Houghton Mifflin Company.
- Maclay, Edgar S. (1898). A History of the United States Navy, from 1775 to 1898. D. Appleton and Co.

== External Sources ==
- Dorney Jr., Douglas R., "The Deadliest Seconds of the War" in the Journal of the American Revolution, December 16, 2025. https://allthingsliberty.com/2025/12/the-deadliest-seconds-of-the-war/
