= Cyrus Townsend Brady =

American journalist, historian and adventure writer (1861–1920)

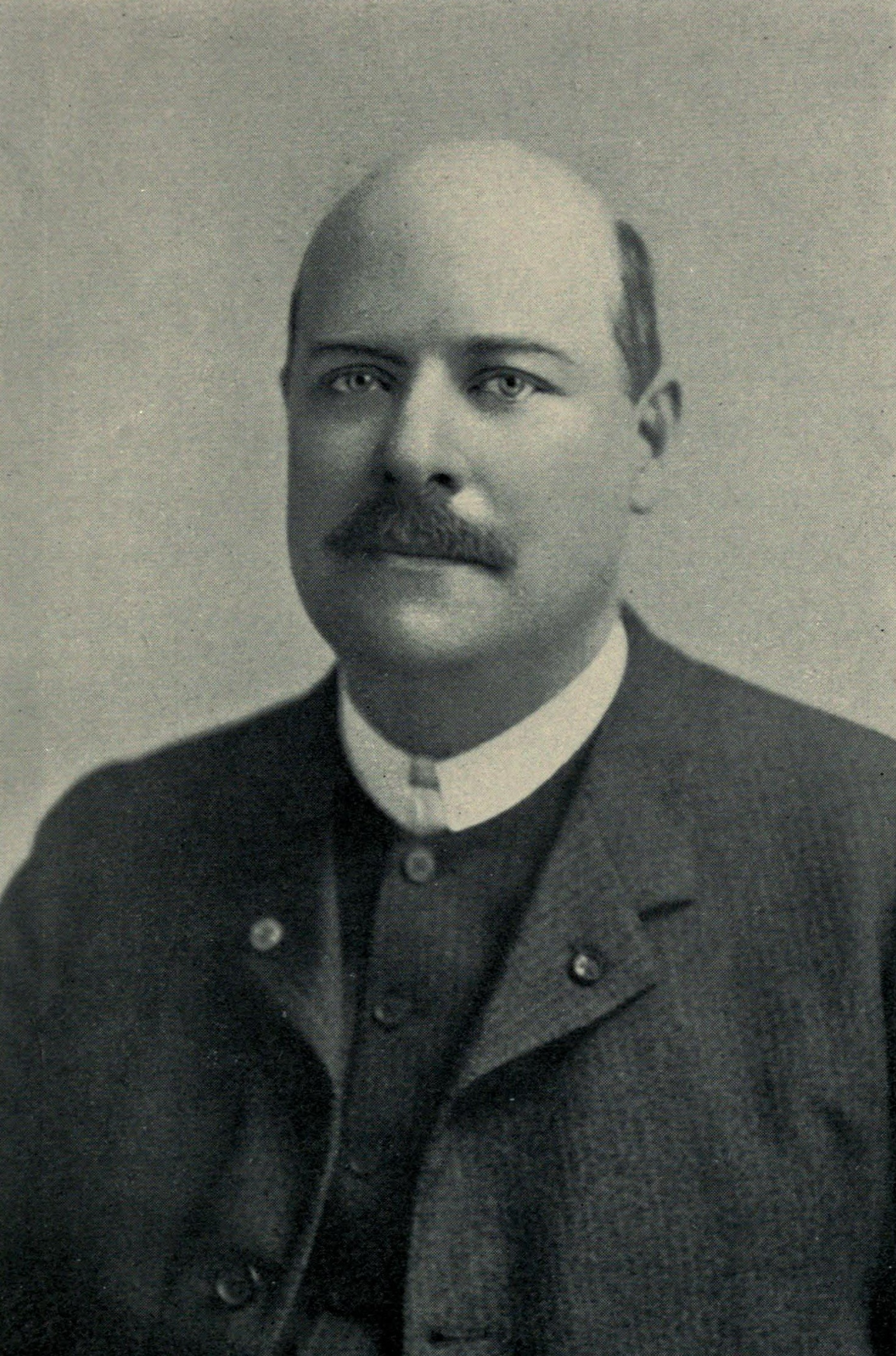
Cyrus Townsend Brady

Cyrus Townsend Brady (December 20, 1861 – January 24, 1920) was an American priest, journalist, historian and adventure writer. His best-known work is Indian Fights and Fighters.

== Background ==
He was born in Allegheny, Pennsylvania, and graduated from the U.S. Naval Academy in 1883. In 1889, he was ordained a deacon in the Episcopal church, and was ordained a priest in 1890. His first wife was Clarissa Guthrie, who died in 1890. His second wife was Mary Barrett.

Brady's first major book, For Love of Country, whilst telling the story of a fictitious John Seymour, was actually based in part on the true heroics of Nicholas Biddle, one of the first five captains of the fledgling Continental Navy.

Brady was also famous for his opposition to feminism and Women's suffrage: he preached many anti-suffrage sermons and described women voters as "an insult to God".

In 1914, Brady began working as a screenwriter at Vitagraph Company of America.

Brady died in Yonkers, New York of pneumonia at age 58.

== Selected works ==
A detailed list of Brady's work can be found at The Online Books Page. Among his better known books are listed below; starred works are considered to be fantastic literature:

- The Island of Regeneration (1888)
- For Love of Country (1898)
- American Fights and Fighters (1900)
- Recollections of a Missionary in the Great West (1900)
- Hohenzollern: A Story of the Time of Frederick Barbarossa (1901)
- The Southerners (1903)
- A Little Traitor to the South (1904)
- A Midshipman in the Pacific (1904)
- Indian Fights and Fighters (1904)
- The Corner in Coffee (1904)
- Three Daughters of the Confederacy (1905)
- The Patriots (1906)
- Northwestern Fights and Fighters (1907)
- As the Sparks Fly Upward * (1911)
- Bob Dashaway Privateersman (1911)
- Hearts and the Highway (1911)
- Secret Service (1912)
- The Chalice of Courage: A Romance of Colorado adapted into a six part Vitagraph film
- The Island of the Stairs * (1913)
- Britton of the Seventh: A Romance of Custer and the Great Northwest A.C. McClurg & Co. Chicago (1914)
- And Thus He Came: A Christmas Fantasy New York and London: G. P. Putnam's Sons (1916)
- By the World Forgot * (1917)
- Little France

Many more titles by Cyrus Townsend Brady are listed in: American Fiction, 1901–1925: A Bibliography by Geoffrey D. Smith, pp. 75–78.
