= USS Randolph (1776) =

American Continental Navy frigate

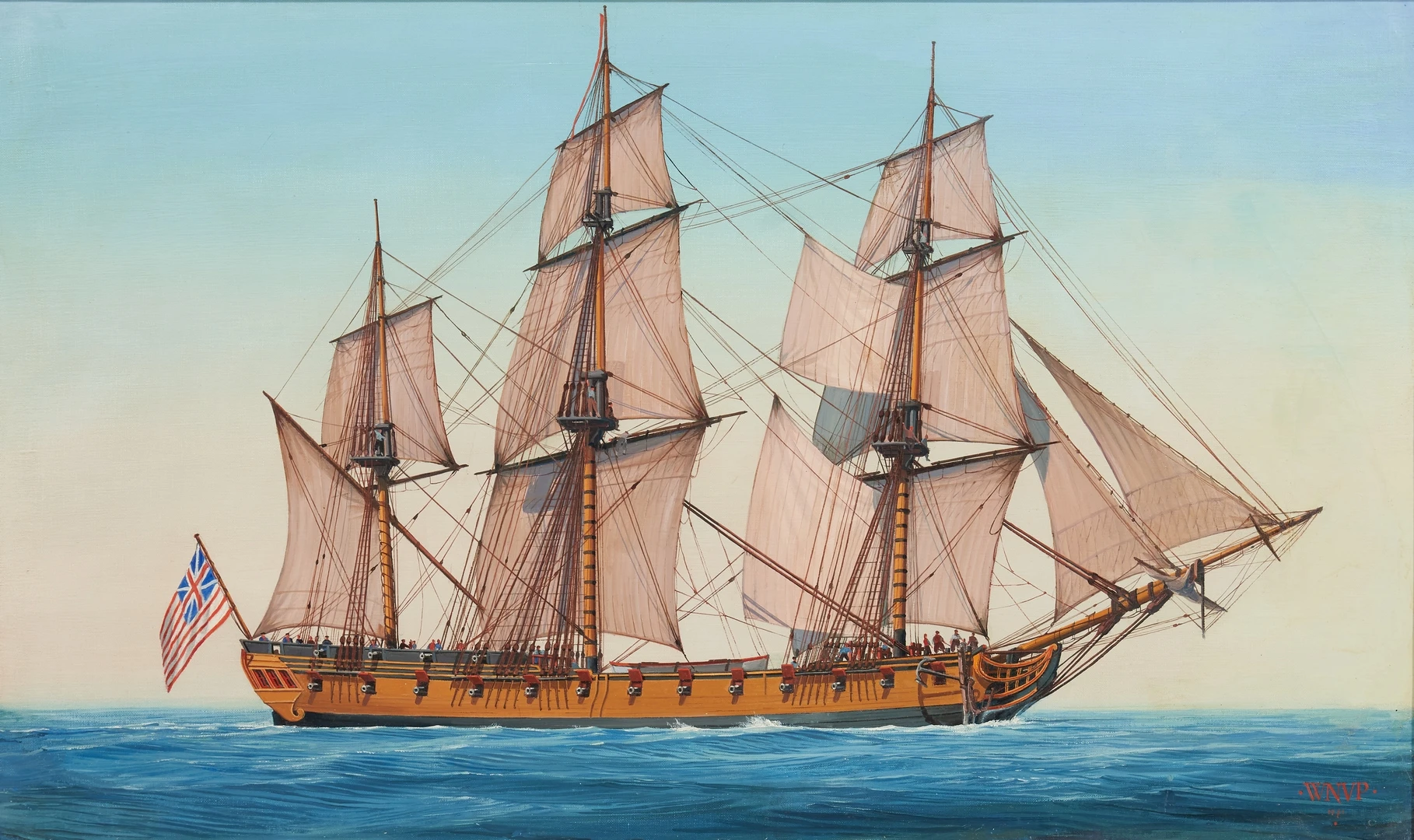
- 1973 painting of Randolph by William Nowland Van Powell

History

United States
- Name: USS Randolph
- Namesake: Peyton Randolph
- Ordered: 13 December 1775
- Builder: Wharton and Humphreys
- Launched: 10 July 1776
- Fate: Sunk by explosion, 7 March 1778 (311 killed/4 survived)

General characteristics
- Type: Frigate
- Length: 132 ft 9 in (40.46 m)
- Beam: 34 ft 6 in (10.52 m)
- Draft: 18 ft (5.5 m)
- Depth: 10 ft 6 in (3.20 m)
- Complement: 315
- Armament: 26 x 12 pdrs; 10 x 6 pdrs

Service record
- Commanders: Capt. Nicholas Biddle
- Operations: American Revolutionary War; Battle of Barbados

USS Randolph was a 32-gun frigate of the Continental Navy named for Founding Father Peyton Randolph, the president of the First Continental Congress. Attaining only moderate success in her career, Randolph was destroyed by an explosion of her gunpowder stores during the Battle off Barbados on 8 March 1778.

== Construction ==
Construction of the first Randolph was authorized by the Continental Congress on 13 December 1775. The frigate, designed by Joshua Humphreys, was launched on 10 July 1776, by Wharton and Humphreys at Philadelphia, Pennsylvania. Patriot Nicholas Biddle, with his extensive naval experience, was appointed captain of the Randolph on 11 July; he formally assumed command of the frigate in mid-October.

== Maiden voyage ==
Seamen were scarce and recruiting was slow, delaying the ship's maiden voyage. In desperation, captured British seamen were pressed into service at Philadelphia; the resulting riot forced the soldiers assigned to escort the sailors to fire into the prison windows. Finally manned, Randolph sailed down the Delaware River on 3 February 1777, and three days later rounded Cape Henlopen, on her first assignment escorting a large group of American merchantmen to sea to obtain supplies and funds for the American cause. On the 15th, the convoy separated, with some of Randolph's charges heading for France and the rest setting course for the West Indies.

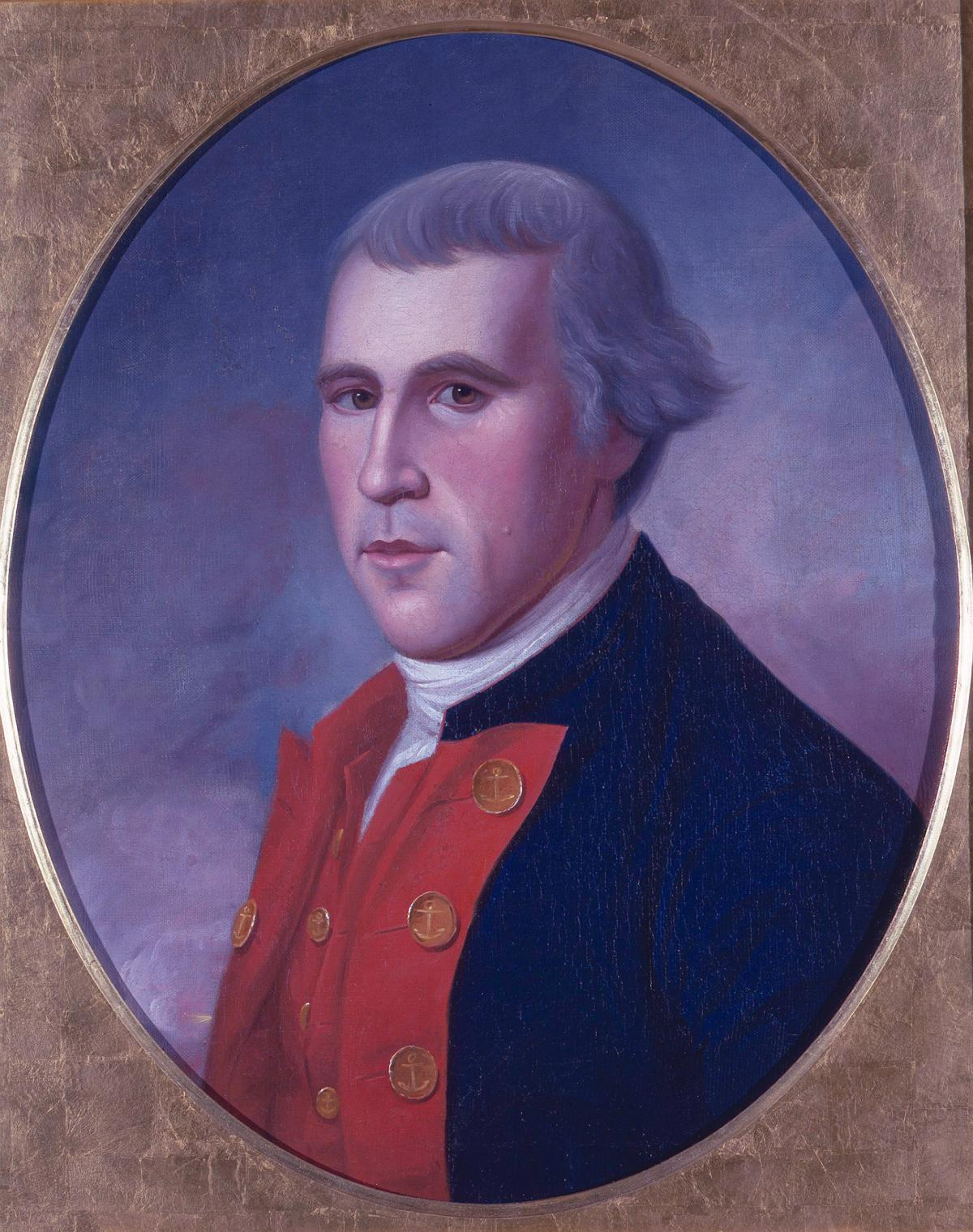
Portrait of Biddle by James Peale

The frigate herself turned northward with plans to intercept HMS Milford, a British frigate responsible for the loss of several New England vessels involved in blockade running. A ship matching Milford's description was captured; after Biddle identified it as a French man-o'-war, he set it free. Then, as she continued the search, Randolph sprung her foremast. While the crew labored to jury-rig a replacement, the ship's mainmast broke and toppled into the sea.

Continuing the hunt was out of the question as the ship had lost much of her maneuverability and speed. Now seeking to avoid the Royal Navy's warships, Biddle ordered the ship south towards the Carolina coast. An epidemic of fever broke out as Randolph limped along, and many members of the crew died and were hastily buried at sea. Biddle also had to deal with a failed uprising by the British captives on his ship before reaching Charleston, South Carolina, on the afternoon of 11 March.

== Second voyage ==
Twice, after her repairs had been completed and as she was about to get underway, the frigate was kept in port by lightning-splintered mainmasts. Meanwhile, more and more crewmen were lost to sickness, desertion, and the lure of higher pay on merchant vessels.

Recruiting was stimulated by the issuing of bounties, and Randolph was finally readied for sea - this time with her masts protected by lightning rods. She departed Charleston on 16 August and was positioned by Biddle at the mouth of the harbor awaiting favorable winds to put to sea. Two days later, a party from the frigate boarded a departing merchantman, Fair American, and took back into its service a pair of deserters among the ship's crew.

Inshore winds kept Randolph trapped until the breeze shifted on 1 September, wafting the frigate across Charleston Bar. At dusk, on the 3rd, a lookout spotted five vessels: two merchant ships, two brigs, and a sloop. After a nightlong chase, she caught up with her quarry the next morning and took four prizes. The first, a 20-gun privateer, True Briton, was laden with rum for the British troops at New York; Severn, the second prize, had been recaptured by True Briton from a North Carolina privateer while sailing from Jamaica to London with a cargo of sugar, rum, ginger, and logwood. The two brigs, Charming Peggy, a French privateer on escort duty, and L’Assomption, laden with salt, had also been captured by True Briton while plying their way from Martinique to Charleston.

Randolph and her prizes reached Charleston on the morning of 6 September. While the frigate was in port having her hull scraped, the president of South Carolina's General Assembly, John Rutledge, suggested to Biddle that Randolph should join forces with the State Navy and break the British naval blockade of Charleston. Biddle accepted temporary command of the fleet, which, besides Randolph, included General Moultrie, Notre Dame, the converted Fair American, and Polly.

The American ships sailed on 14 February 1778 but encountered no British warships. Biddle then ordered his captains to proceed to the West Indies, hoping to intercept British merchantmen. After two days, they captured (and were subsequently forced to burn) a dismasted and unsalvageable New England merchantman which had been captured by a British privateer while headed for St. Augustine, Florida. Thereafter, game was scarce. They encountered only neutral ships until Polly took a small schooner on 4 March bound from New York to Grenada. Biddle had the ship repurposed as a tender.

== Loss ==
On the afternoon of 7 March, Randolph's lookouts spotted sail on the horizon. At 21:00 that evening, an unidentified ship, now flying British colors, came up on Randolph as the largest ship in the convoy, and demanded they hoist their colors. Randolph then hoisted American colors and fired a broadside into the British ship after Biddle and his officers gambled that they were challenging an inferior sloop-of-war. The stranger turned out to be HMS Yarmouth.

As a 64-gun, two-deck ship of the line, Yarmouth had double the number of guns as Randolph. Yarmouth's guns were also significantly heavier as she mounted 32-pound cannons on her main deck, 18-pounder guns on her upper deck, and 9-pounder guns on her quarterdeck and forecastle, giving her almost five times the weight of shot that Randolph could fire. Randolph and General Moultrie engaged Yarmouth until Randolph's magazine exploded with a blinding flash. Burning debris up to six feet long struck Yarmouth, which significantly damaged her sails and rigging and caused several casualties.

The damage caused to Yarmouth's sails and rigging prevented her from pursuing the remaining South Carolina ships as they slipped away in the darkness. The loss of Randolph resulted in 311 deaths, including Biddle's. Yarmouth picked up four survivors off of wreckage on 12 March. Casualties aboard Yarmouth amounted to five men killed and 12 wounded. The battle was the United States' worst naval defeat, in terms of lives lost, until the Japanese attack on Pearl Harbor in 1941.
