= Nicholas Biddle (naval officer) =

Royal Navy officer

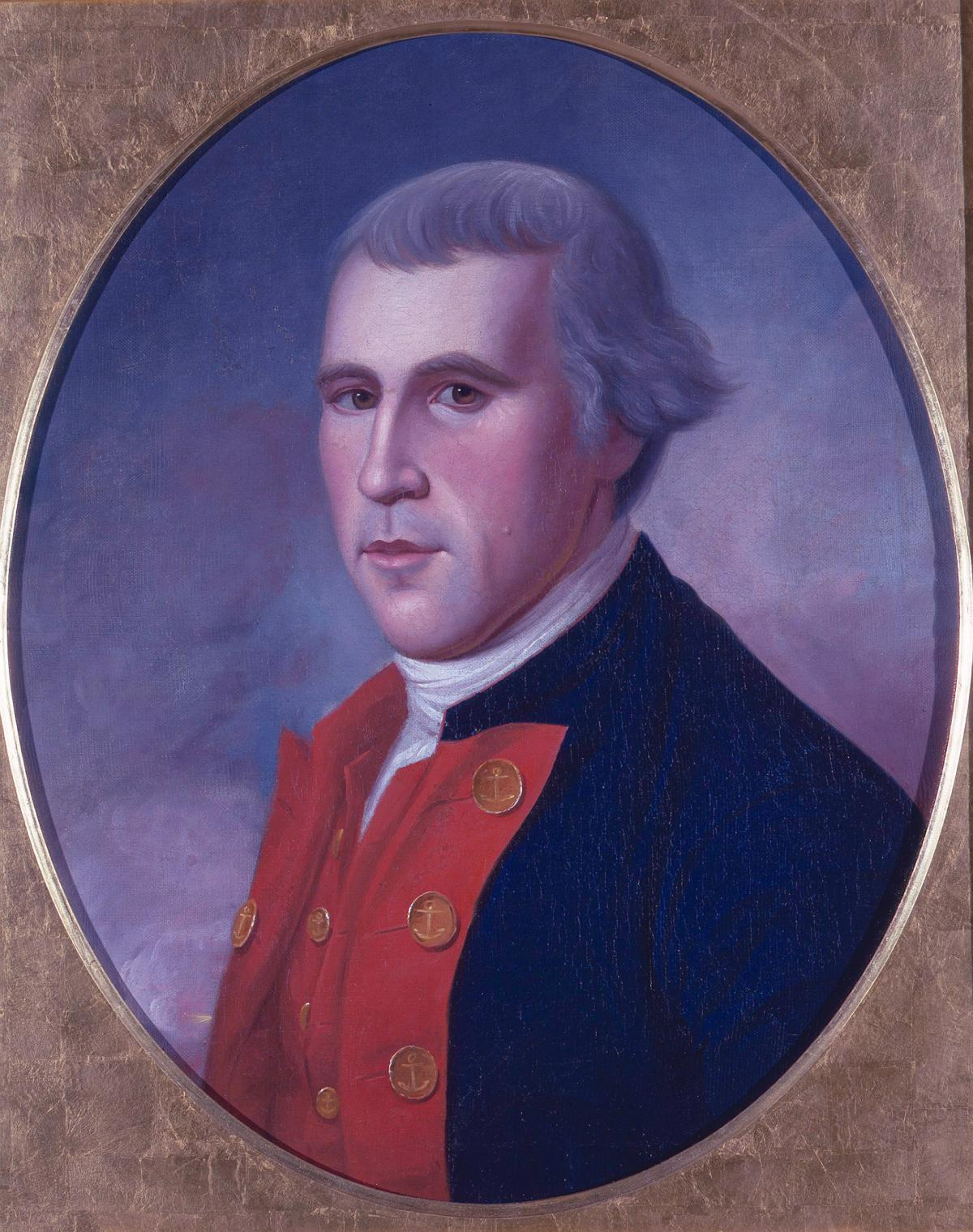
- Portrait by James Peale
- Born: September 10, 1750; Philadelphia, Pennsylvania
- Died: March 7, 1778 (aged 27) Atlantic Ocean
- Allegiance: Great Britain; United States
- Branch: Royal Navy; Continental Navy
- Service years: 1770–1773 (Great Britain); 1775–1778 (United States)
- Rank: Midshipman (Great Britain); Captain (United States)
- Commands: USS Andrew Doria; USS Randolph
- Conflicts: American Revolutionary War; Raid of Nassau; Battle of Block Island; Battle of Barbados †

Captain Nicholas Biddle (September 10, 1750 – March 7, 1778) was a Continental Navy officer who served in the American Revolutionary War. Born in Philadelphia, Biddle began his career at sea in 1763 and joined the Royal Navy at the age of 20. In 1773, he participated in an exploratory voyage to the Arctic with Constantine Phipps and Horatio Nelson. After the Revolutionary War broke out in 1775, Biddle joined the Continental Navy as one of its first five captains, commanding both the USS Andrew Doria and USS Randolph. In 1778, Randolph confronted HMS Yarmouth in the Battle off Barbados. After a twenty-minute battle, Biddle's ship Randolph suddenly exploded, killing him and most of his men. Four ships of the United States Navy have been named in his honor.

== Early life ==
Nicholas Biddle was born in Philadelphia in 1750, one of nine children to William Biddle (1698–1756) of the Biddle family, and Mary Scull (1709–1789). Biddle went to sea at the age of thirteen, as a ship's boy aboard a merchant vessel trading in the West Indies. In 1770, he joined the Royal Navy and served three years until resigning in 1773 to accompany Captain Constantine Phipps on his expedition towards the North Pole. While on this voyage, Biddle became acquainted with Horatio Nelson, the future British admiral and fellow member of Phipps' expedition.

== American Revolutionary War ==
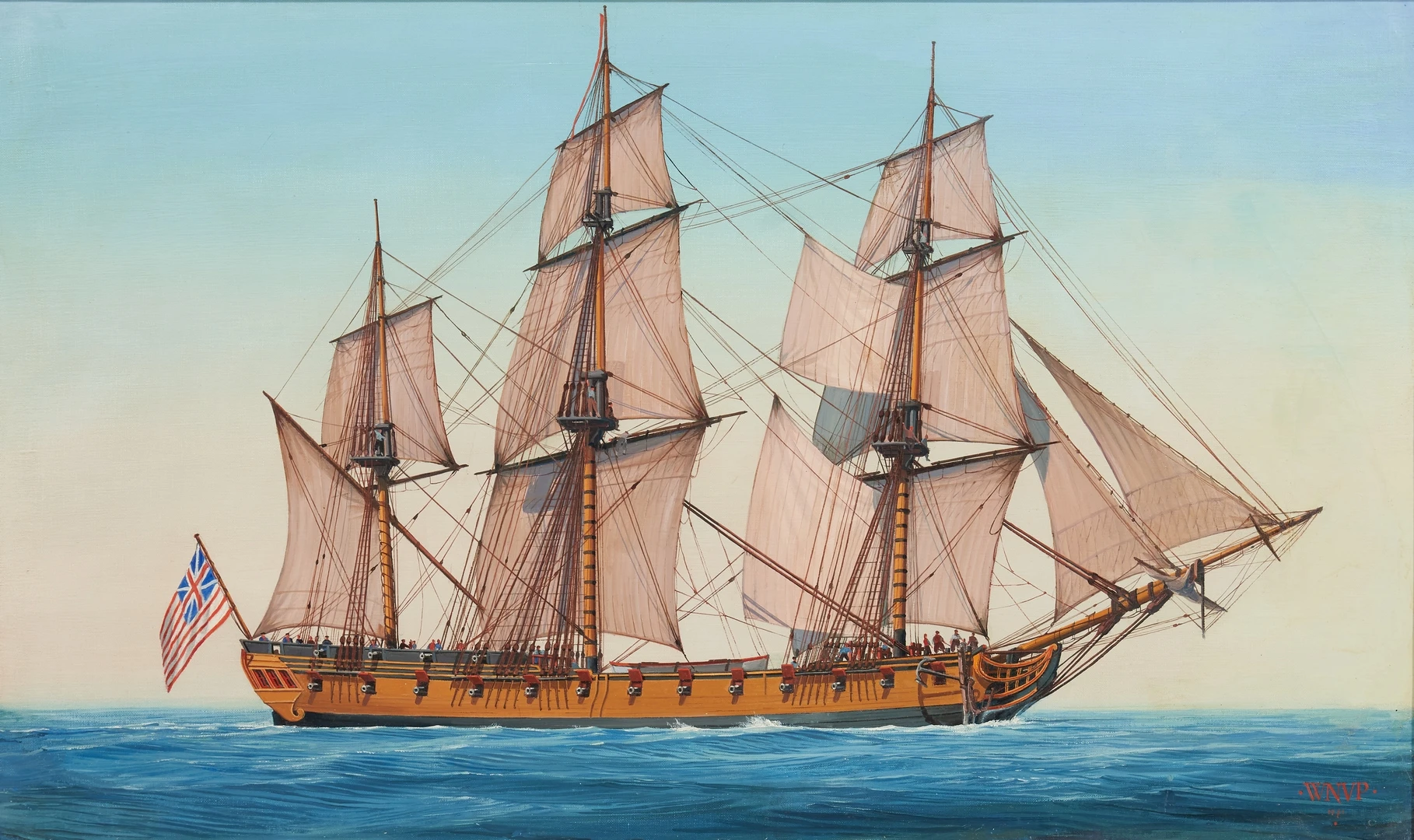
Randolph, Biddle's last command

In 1775, Biddle, sympathizing with colonists who were opposed to British rule, returned to North America to offer his services to the State of Pennsylvania. With the outbreak of the American Revolutionary War, the Pennsylvania Committee of Safety placed Biddle in command of the armed galley Franklin. In December 1775, Biddle was commissioned into the newly established Continental Navy and made captain of the 14-gun brig Andrew Doria. Biddle participated in the expedition against New Providence and fought in the Continental Navy's failed action with HMS Glasgow on April 6, 1776. Biddle was highly critical of the action, noting that the lack of signaling by his superior, Commodore Esek Hopkins, led to a "helter skelter" action. Biddle quickly developed a reputation as an able captain by capturing numerous vessels, including British troopships, on later cruises.

One of his most exceptional campaigns occurred during a cruise of the Newfoundland Banks; Biddle's crew was so successful in the taking of ships that by the time they returned to port, only five sailors were steering Biddle's flagship; the rest were crewing the prizes taken during the cruise. On June 6, 1776, Biddle was appointed by the Continental Congress to command Randolph, a 32-gun frigate then being built in Philadelphia as part of a plan to drastically expand the size and power of the American naval fleet. She was launched near the close of the year and sailed early in 1777. In September 1777, Randolph attained her first success by capturing HMS True Briton and her three-ship convoy.

On March 7, 1778, off Barbados, Randolph engaged the 64-gun British ship of the line HMS Yarmouth. Rather than trying to flee from the more heavily armed opponent, Randolph sailed into battle so the merchant fleet it was escorting could escape. An eyewitness reported the frigate held her own in the twenty-minute engagement, appearing, "to fire four or five broadsides to the Yarmouth's one." After Biddle was wounded, Randolph blew up suddenly, killing all but four of the 305 souls on board, including Biddle. The loss of Randolph was a serious blow to the fledgling Continental Navy. His body was lost at sea and never recovered.

Biddle's fiancee, Elizabeth Elliott Baker, could not be consoled. His brother, Edward Biddle, was a staunch advocate for American independence, and his nephew, Nicholas Biddle, was an esteemed banker. Four ships of the United States Navy have been named USS Biddle in his honor. Cyrus Townsend Brady's book For Love of Country is based partly on the life of Biddle, in particular the action between Randolph and Yarmouth.

== Bibliography ==
- Allen, Gardner Weld (1913). A naval history of the American Revolution. Vol. 1. Houghton Mifflin Company. p. 600.
- McGrath, Tim (August 2015). "I Fear Nothing". Naval History. 29 (4). United States Naval Institute.
