= HMS Yarmouth (1745) =

Ship of the line of the Royal Navy

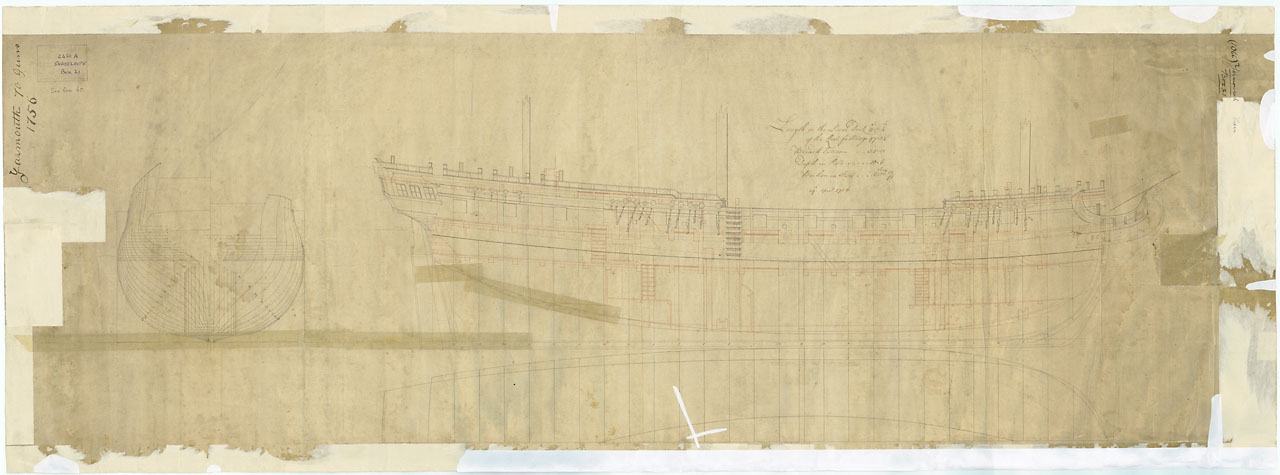
- Plan of Yarmouth

History

Great Britain
- Name: HMS Yarmouth
- Ordered: 16 June 1742
- Builder: Deptford Dockyard
- Laid down: 25 November 1742
- Launched: 8 March 1745
- Commissioned: February 1745
- In service: 1745–1752; 1753–1760; 1763–1770; 1777–1781; 1781–1807
- Honours and awards: Second Battle of Cape Finisterre, 1747; Seven Years' War; American Revolutionary War; Battle of the Saintes, 1782
- Fate: Broken up, April 1811

General characteristics
- Class & type: 1741 proposals 64-gun third rate ship of the line
- Tons burthen: 1359 38/94 bm
- Length: 160 ft (48.8 m) (gundeck); 130 ft 6 in (39.8 m) (keel)
- Beam: 44 ft 3 in (13.5 m)
- Depth of hold: 19 ft (5.8 m)
- Propulsion: Sails
- Sail plan: Full-rigged ship
- Complement: 480
- Armament: Gundeck: 26 × 32-pounder guns; Upper gundeck: 26 × 18-pounder guns; Quarterdeck: 10 × 9-pounder guns; Forecastle: 2 × 9-pounder guns

HMS Yarmouth was a 64-gun third rate ship of the line of the Royal Navy, designed and built by Joseph Allin the younger at Deptford Dockyard. She was previously ordered to the dimensions specified in the 1741 proposals for modifications to the 1719 Establishment, but the Admiralty had very quickly concluded that these were too small, and as an experiment in 1742 authorised an addition of 6 ft to the planned length, and Yarmouth was re-ordered to the enlarged design in June 1742. She was built at Deptford, where the Admiralty felt they could best observe the effectiveness of the added size, and launched on 8 March 1745.

Commissioned in February 1745 under Captain Roger Martin. In 1747 under Captain Piercy Brett she was one of George Anson's squadron at the First Battle of Cape Finisterre. Yarmouth became a guardship in 1763, serving alternately between Chatham and Sheerness. She was recommissioned for the Leeward Islands in 1777 and sailed on 9 September. In 1781, Yarmouth was reduced in armament to become a 60-gun ship. She remained in this role until 1811, when she was broken up.

On 22 January 1778 she captured brigs "Fortune" and "Alexander" off Dominico.

== Destroying USS Randolph ==
On 7 March 1778 Yarmouth was attacked by the American frigate Randolph of 36 guns and the 20-gun sloop, General Moultrie. With fewer guns and of a smaller calibre, the frigate and sloop managed to cause some minor damage to two of Yarmouth's topmasts and a portion of her bowsprit, Randolph then attempted to rake (fire through the length of) the ship; Randolph was firing three broadsides to Yarmouth's one; however, the 12 lb shot would have struggled to penetrate Yarmouth's hull, while Yarmouth's 18- and 32-pounder guns would have been able to penetrate any part of her comparatively lightly planked opponents. Randolph exploded during the engagement, likely due to a shot penetrating her magazine, killing all but four of her crew. Part of her wreckage landed on Yarmouth's decks, including Randolph's ensign. Yarmouth had to repair two damaged topmasts but suffered no significant damage. Five men were killed and twelve wounded aboard HMS Yarmouth. General Moultrie fled following Randolph's destruction.

On Thursday the following, being in chase of a ship, a man at the masthead of Yarmouth called down to the officer on the quarterdeck. He saw something in the water abaft the beam, but could not initially recognise what it was. With the help of a spy-glass he soon discovered four men seemingly standing on the water, for what supported them was not visible. HMS Yarmouth took 2 to 3 hours to eventually reach the men, who were standing on a small float, and were brought aboard. They turned out to be from the destroyed ship Randolph. The account they gave was that they were in the quarter cabin and were thrown into the water when the ship blew up. They managed to tie together a makeshift raft from the floating debris and were fortunate to survive by using a blanket to capture rainwater during their stranded five nights at sea.
