= Spencer Pettis =

American politician (1802–1831)

Member of the U.S. House of Representatives from Missouri's at-large district
- In office March 4, 1829 – August 28, 1831
- Preceded by: Edward Bates
- Succeeded by: William Henry Ashley

Secretary of State of Missouri
- In office 1826–1828
- Governor: John Miller
- Preceded by: Hamilton Rowan Gamble
- Succeeded by: Priestly H. McBride

Personal details
- Born: Spencer Darwin Pettis; 1802 Culpeper County, Virginia, U.S.
- Died: August 28, 1831 (aged 28–29) St. Louis, Missouri, U.S.
- Party: Democratic-Republican (before 1825); Jacksonian (1825–1831)
- Relatives: Fontaine H. Pettis (brother)

Spencer Darwin Pettis (1802 – August 28, 1831) was a U.S. representative from Missouri, serving from 1828 until his death in 1831. He was also the fourth Missouri secretary of state. Pettis is best known for being a participant in a fatal duel with Major Thomas Biddle. Pettis County, Missouri, is named in his honor.

== Early life ==
Spencer Pettis was born in Culpeper County, Virginia, to parents John and Martha (Reynolds) Pettis in 1802. His father was a veteran of the American Revolution, serving with the 1st Regiment, Virginia Line at the Battle of Guilford Court House and elsewhere. Spencer Pettis' exact date of birth and much about his childhood is unknown. Genealogy records indicate he did have at least two sisters, one of whom, Sally, was the mother of American Civil War naval officer Thornton A. Jenkins. Spencer Pettis received at least enough education to study for the law and become a practicing attorney. Pettis moved west in 1821, settling in central Missouri's Boonslick region, opening a law practice in the Howard County seat of Fayette, Missouri.

== Politics ==
Despite his youth – he did not meet the minimum age of 24 required by the Missouri Constitution – Spencer Pettis was elected to the Missouri General Assembly in 1824 by an overwhelming margin. He would serve less than one full term in the legislature however. In July 1826 Missouri Governor John Miller appointed Pettis the Missouri Secretary of State. It was while in that position he became a friend and protege' of U.S. Senator Thomas Hart Benton and an ardent Jacksonian Democrat. Through these new connections Pettis won election in 1828 as Missouri's sole member of the U.S. House of Representatives. At the time most of Missouri's population was centered along the Mississippi and Missouri Rivers. Pettis, seeking every vote possible, had a large number of handbills printed promoting his campaign and distributed them far and wide across the most remote areas of the state. During his brief time in Congress Pettis cast several votes of some historical interest. Among them were "aye" on a bill to continue work on the Cumberland Road and a resolution urging the U.S. President negotiate with other nations for the abolition of the African slave trade. Pettis would be reelected to a second term in Congress in 1830, but by then the die had been cast in a conflict that would rock Missouri politics and take Pettis' life.

== Duel ==
What transpired on August 27, 1831, had its roots many months earlier. Missouri's Jacksonian Democrats, led by Senator Thomas Hart Benton, engaged in a number of debates during the 1830 Congressional election season that saw many fiery speeches on issues of banking, currency stability, and western land use. During one of those speeches, Congressman Pettis harshly criticized Nicholas Biddle, President of the Second Bank of the United States. U.S. Army Major Thomas Biddle, a resident of the St. Louis area and brother of Nicholas Biddle, took offense at the remarks.

A war of words soon ensued in the St. Louis press in the form of letters to the editor. In one such letter, Biddle called Pettis "a dish of skimmed milk", to which Pettis responded by questioning Biddle's manhood. Pettis was reelected to U.S. Congress in November 1830, but the feud between the two refused to die. Things escalated dramatically on July 9, 1831, when Thomas Biddle heard that an ill Pettis was resting in a St. Louis hotel. Biddle attacked Pettis in his room, beating him severely with a cowhide whip until other hotel guests intervened.

Fearing that he might be attacked again during his recovery, Congressman Pettis had Major Biddle arrested on a peace warrant. At the court proceedings, Pettis attempted to draw a pistol, with the intention of shooting Biddle, but was restrained by friends. At this, Biddle stated that he would promptly accept any challenge that the Congressman cared to issue. After sufficient time to recover from the beating, on August 21, 1831, Congressman Pettis challenged Biddle to a duel, which was promptly accepted. As the challenged party, Biddle was allowed to choose the weapons and distance. Being nearsighted, Major Biddle chose pistols at the unusually close distance of five feet. This meant that each man would take at most one or two steps before turning to fire, with their pistols perhaps even overlapping, depending on arm length. In short, it was suicidal and seen as a ploy by some observers and later historians to make Pettis back down and thus lose the affair of honor without bloodshed.

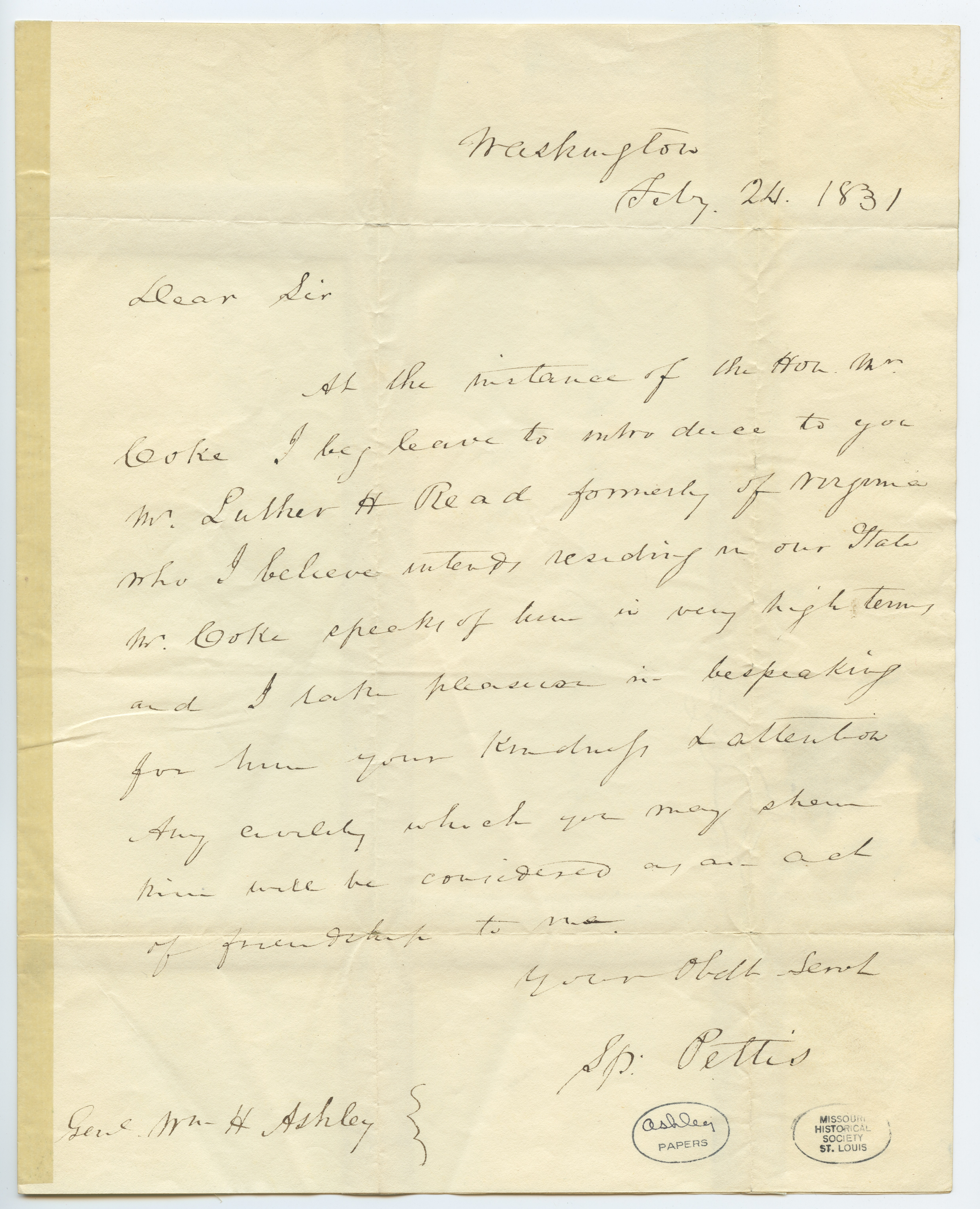
1831 letter from Pettis to General Ashley

At five p.m. on August 27, 1831, Biddle and Pettis, along with their seconds, Major Benjamin O'Fallon and Captain Martin Thomas respectively, met on Bloody Island, a small sandbar located in the Mississippi River between St. Louis and the Illinois shore. Dueling was illegal in both states, but authorities tended to turn a blind eye to this neutral ground. As large crowds watched from the St. Louis riverfront, Biddle and Pettis obeyed the commands to step, turn, and fire. When the smoke cleared, both men had fallen with mortal wounds. Before being carried off the island, both men were overheard to forgive each other for the altercation. Congressman Spencer Pettis died the next day, while Major Biddle lingered on until August 29. Both men were buried with full honors, eulogized for choosing death before dishonor. The funerals for both men were said to be the largest ever held in St. Louis in the 19th century.

Spencer Pettis never married and had no children. William Henry Ashley was elected to finish Pettis's term in the House of Representatives.

== See also ==
- List of members of the United States Congress killed or wounded in office
- List of members of the United States Congress who died in office (1790–1899)
- List of duels in the United States
- Fontaine H. Pettis

Political offices
Preceded by Hamilton Rowan Gamble	Secretary of State of Missouri; 1826–1828	Succeeded by Priestly H. McBride
U.S. House of Representatives
Preceded by Edward Bates	Member of the U.S. House of Representatives from Missouri's at-large congressional district 1829–1831	Succeeded by William Henry Ashley
