= Andalusia (estate) =

Historic house in Pennsylvania, United States

- U.S. National Register of Historic Places
- U.S. National Historic Landmark
- Pennsylvania state historical marker
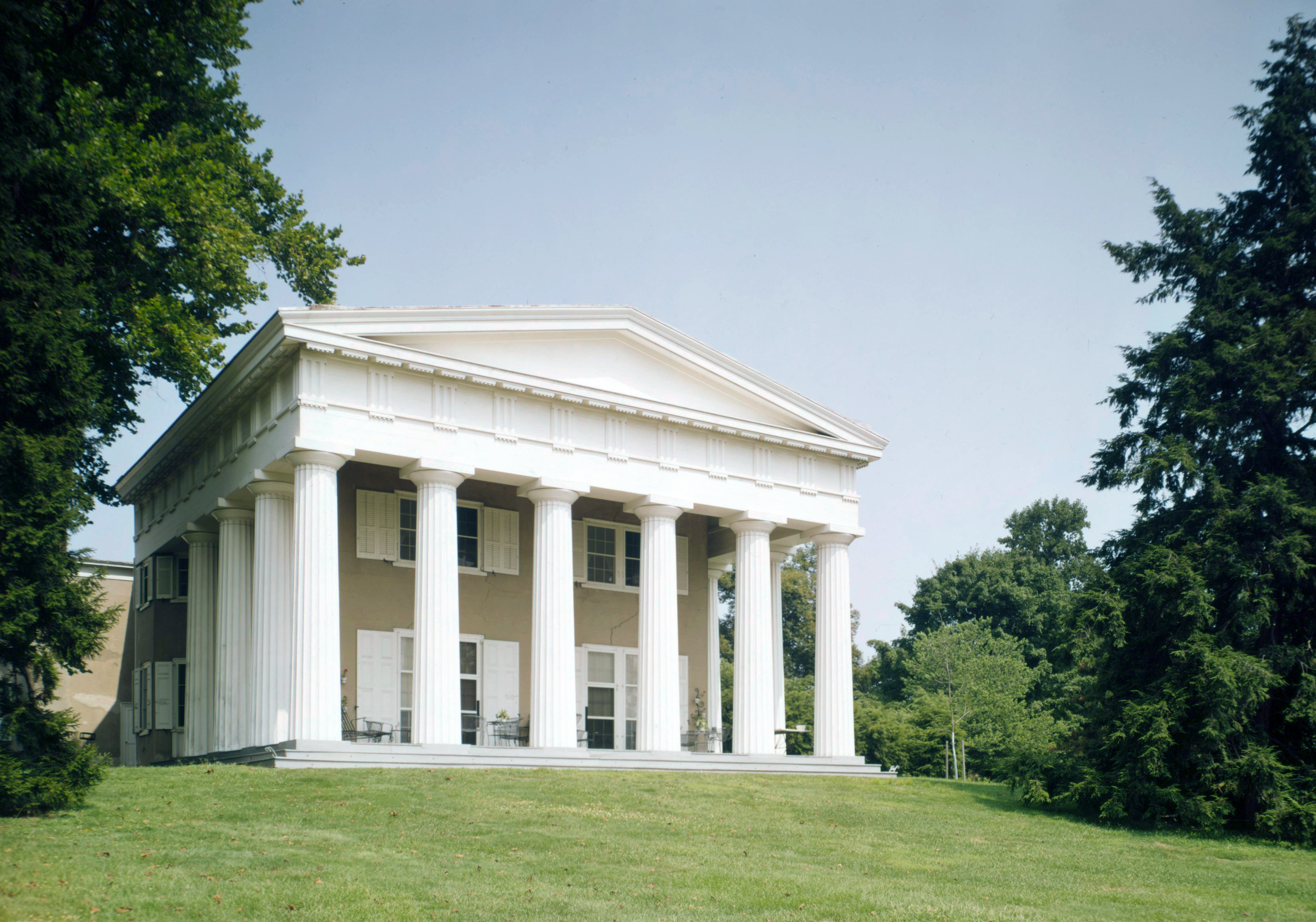
- Andalusia in 1976

- Location within Pennsylvania Location within the United States
- Interactive map showing the location of Andalusia
- Location: 1237 State Road, Andalusia, Pennsylvania, U.S.
- Nearest city: Philadelphia, Pennsylvania
- Coordinates: 40°3′43″N 74°57′30″W
- Area: 225 acres (91 ha)
- Built: 1794
- Architect: Benjamin Latrobe, Thomas U. Walter
- Architectural style: Colonial Revival, Greek Revival
- NRHP reference No.: 66000649

Significant dates
- Added to NRHP: November 13, 1966
- Designated NHL: November 13, 1966
- Designated PHMC: November 01, 2001

Andalusia, also known as the Nicholas Biddle Estate, is a historic mansion and estate located on the Delaware River, just northeast of Philadelphia, in Bensalem Township, Bucks County, Pennsylvania. The community surrounding it, Andalusia, takes its name from the 225-acre estate.

== History ==
The original house was built in 1794 by John Craig, who named it after the Andalusia region of Spain. Craig hired architect Benjamin Latrobe to expand the house in 1806 in a Greek Revival style. In 1811, Craig's daughter Jane married prominent financier Nicholas Biddle (1786–1844). Biddle and architect Thomas U. Walter expanded the house into a mansion in 1834–36. Walter is best known for his design for the dome of the United States Capitol.

Their most dramatic addition was a two-and-a-half-story wing, surrounded on three sides by massive Doric columns, that thrust southward toward the river. This contained twin parlors on the main floor, divided by pocket doors that could be opened to create a single room. The wing ended in a portico, one that has become an icon of Greek Revival architecture. Across the north façade, a two-story block of new rooms created a grand entrance and service spaces. Some of Latrobe's 1806 spaces were retained in the 1830s alterations, including twin rooms with semi-octagonal ends.

Notable Biddle family members include Nicholas's brother Commodore James Biddle (1783–1848), son Congressman Charles John Biddle (1819–1873), great-grandson and aviator Charles John Biddle (1890–1972), and great-great-grandson and National Trust for Historic Preservation president James "Jimmy" Biddle (1929–2005). The property remains in the Biddle family.

The house was declared a National Historic Landmark in 1966. According to the National Park Service, "Andalusia is one of the earliest and most pristine examples of the Greek Revival style in the country." Today it is operated as a house museum.

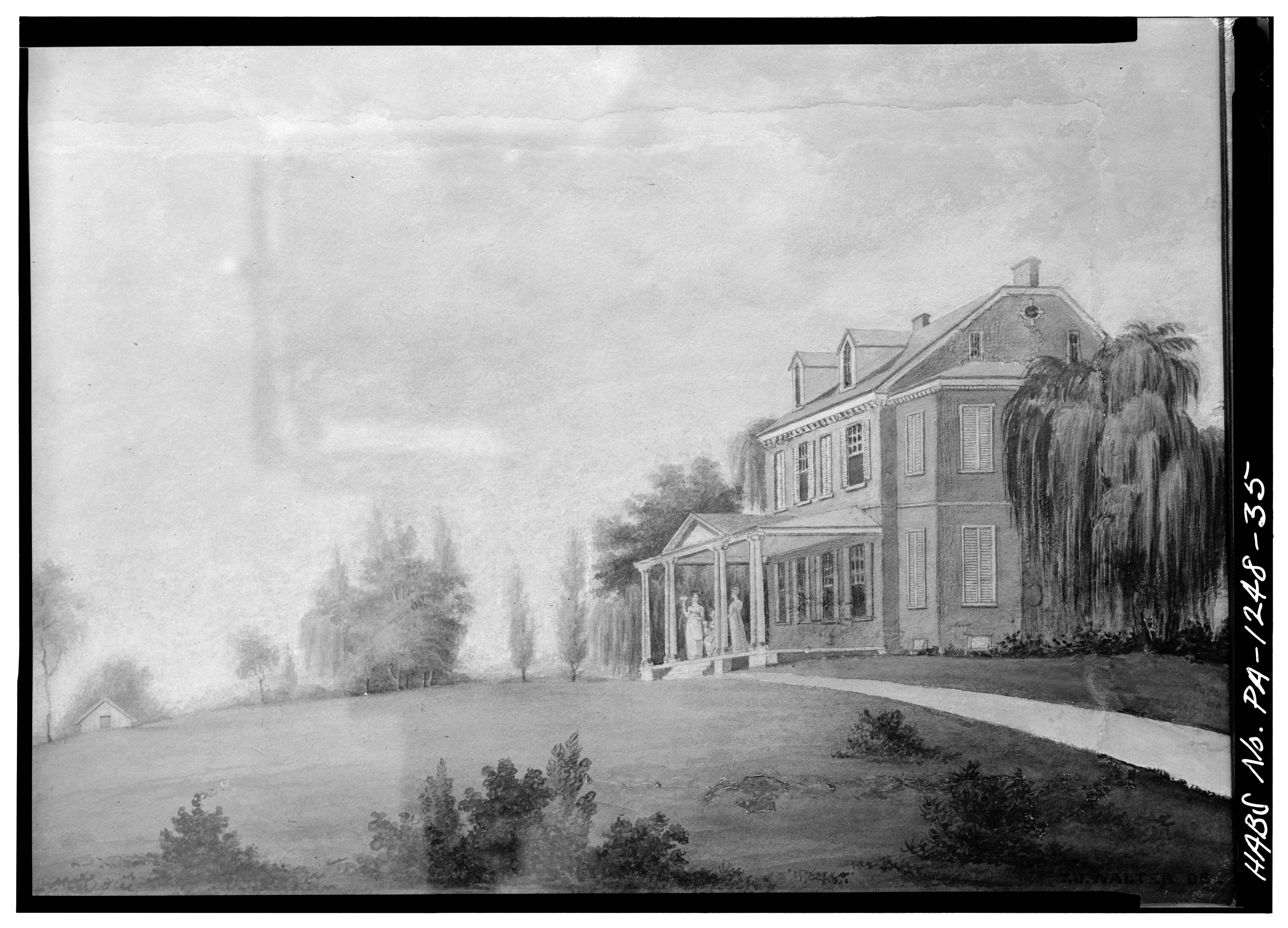
Andalusia (circa 1834), watercolor by Thomas U. Walter. This shows Latrobe's alterations from 1806.

First floor plan.

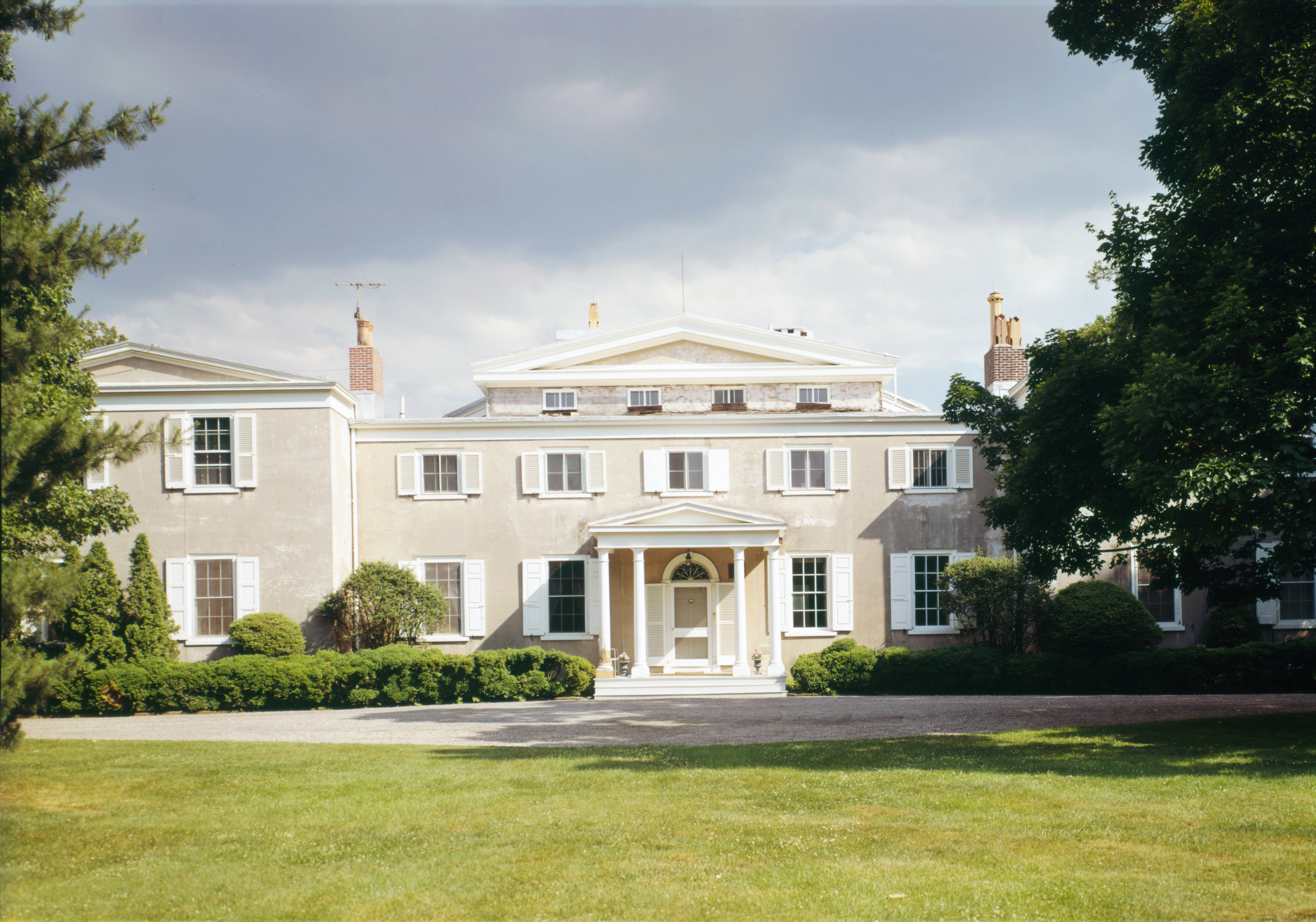
North façade.
