= Fontaine H. Pettis =

American slave catcher, fraudster (d. 1858)

Fontaine Pettis
- Born: c. 1799; Virginia, United States
- Died: May 24, 1858 (aged c. 59); New York City, New York, United States
- Burial place: Green-Wood Cemetery, New York, United States
- Occupation(s): Slave catcher, fraudster, attorney
- Spouse: Sarah
- Parent(s): John Pettis; Martha Reynolds

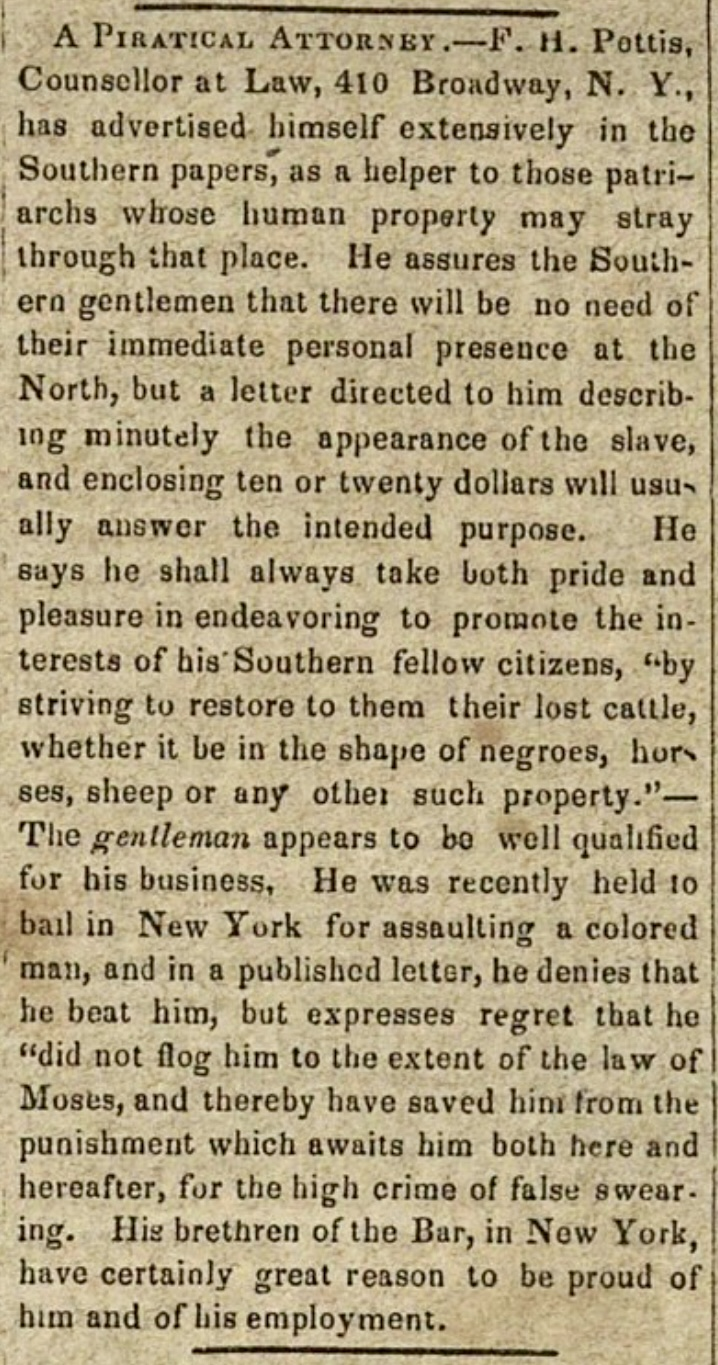
"A Piratical Attorney" Signal of Liberty, September 15, 1841

Fontaine H. Pettis (c. 1799 – May 24, 1858), often doing business as F. H. Pettis, was a 19th-century American fraudster and/or attorney who specialized in recovering fugitive slaves for enslavers prior to the American Civil War. Based in Philadelphia, and later New York City, he advertised his services in southern newspapers. He is classed by most historians of slavery as a Northern slave catcher or "slave taker" even though he boasted of being a native of Virginia. He was also likely something of a charlatan, accused of fraud in more than one circumstance, and convicted of perjury in Washington, D.C in 1831. President Andrew Jackson pardoned Pettis on the perjury charges, possibly due to political influence. Several surviving records suggest he periodically could not or would not pay his bills, and so he attempted to borrow money from wealthier acquaintances or, more often, simply defaulted on the obligation. Pettis also worked as a small-time salesman, advertising corn plasters for feet, and trying to sell a waterproofing process.

== Family and early career ==
Pettis was a native of Orange County, Virginia. He was the son of an American Revolutionary War veteran named John Pettis and his wife Martha "Patsy" (Reynolds) Pettis. He was a brother of U.S. Representative Spencer Pettis. According to historians at the University of Tennessee, Pettis was born around 1799. The 1850 census and New York City death records place his birth some 20 years later, around 1819.

The Tazewell family papers at the Library of Virginia hold a letter from F. H. Pettis to Littleton Tazewell on June 19, 1826, which apparently contained words to the effect that Pettis "was travelling from Washington to Richmond via steamboat—received letter [that] requires his return to Washington—asks Tazewell for $10 loan". (Note: The Library of Virginia finding aid to the Tazewell papers also notes that the outside of the letter is marked "John F. Pettis" even though it is signed F. H. Pettis.) In 1826, when Henry Clay was serving as U.S. Secretary of State, Pettis wrote him three different times asking for a patronage job; none was granted. Pettis was working as attorney by 1827, at which time he married a Philadelphian named Johanna M. Grotjan. In 1828, he and a partner named J. H. Lee were soliciting subscriptions for a 500-page biography of Thomas Jefferson, who had died two years earlier at the age of 83. In 1829, he wrote twice to newly elected president Andrew Jackson, asking to be appointed a federal district attorney somewhere in the west, and later asking for a government job generally; none was granted. In 1830, a buyer-beware item about him appeared in a Lancaster, Pennsylvania paper, written by an anonymous correspondent signing himself "Anti-Mason":

A CAUTION. Mr. CLARKE,–In the Pennsylvania Inquirer of this morning, I observe an advertisement, signed F. H. Pettis & Co; announcing their intention of publishing a newspaper in the city of Washington entitled The Washington Galaxy, and Anti-Masonic Herald. The Mr. Pettis there subscribed, is doubtless the notorious F. H. Pettis, formerly of Virginia, but for several years past a resident in and about the city of Philadelphia, who has subsisted by obtaining money from our citizens under false pretences and against whom bills of indictment were preferred for blasphemy and defrauding a poor woman under the pretence of being an attorney. He is an accomplished swindler; the subscriber is ready to prove him such, and therefore cautions the public against paying him any money, in advance, for the Herald which he represents he intends to publish. In a similar way, he defrauded many of our city by a Prospectus of a life of Jefferson, he also applied to one gentleman to assist him in getting out a book in favour of Jackson, and at the same time to another, to aid him in publishing a book in favor of Adams. Beware! Beware! AN ANTI-MASON.

== Perjury case and presidential pardon ==
In December 1830, Pettis wrote to Henry Clay again, seemingly asking for help getting a newspaper editorship in a pro-Clay media market, volunteering his thoughts on the upcoming election, and describing Francis Blair's newly launched Washington Globe as a pro-Andrew Jackson periodical that sought to replace Duff Green as the official printer to the U.S. Congress: "A Jackson Member (supposing me to be with my Brother & the administration) stated to me that its object is to supplant Duff—that he is to be killed, and they mean to have the honor of doing it themselves.'—Great honor don't you think?" Clay wrote on the back of the letter "not answered". (Note: In February 1831, both houses of Congress voted to renew Green's contract as printer. Blair received one vote of the 47 votes cast in the Senate.)

Spencer Pettis and Thomas Biddle killed each other in a duel fought on the Bloody Bar of the Mississippi River on August 26, 1831. In September 1831, F. H. Pettis was in Washington, D.C., selling corn plasters for treatment of foot maladies. The following month, according to the editors of the multi-volume The Papers of Andrew Jackson:

He and his family were boarding in Washington with John Cromwell (c. 1800–1835), but had fallen into his debt. On October 11, while Pettis was out, Cromwell entered his room, took most of his belongings, and locked them in the cellar as security for Pettis' unpaid board. After failed efforts to reach agreement with Cromwell on the debt and recover his property, Pettis swore an oath before justice of the peace William Hebb (c. 1789–1848) on October 24 that his possessions had been stolen. Hebb issued a search warrant for Cromwell's cellar, where the items were recovered. Cromwell then charged Pettis with perjury for falsely swearing that he had 'feloniously stolen, taken and carried away' Pettis' property...At trial, Cromwell produced proofs that Pettis had known where his things were stored. On November 5 Pettis was convicted of perjury and sentenced to five years in the penitentiary."

Pettis then began agitating for a pardon, writing Jackson directly and getting other people, including seven of the jurors in his trial, to write to him explaining that the words "feloniously stolen" were not in his original statement to the magistrate but were added without his consent, thus his perjury conviction ought to be voided, etc. Citing in part the correspondence from the jurors, Jackson pardoned Pettis on November 16, 1831. Then, according to the editors of the Jackson papers, "On December 1, the Washington Daily National Journal charged that Pettis' crime of perjury was made still 'more atrocious' by its slander of John Cromwell, and that [Jackson] had pardoned this 'man branded with an infamous crime, for no other conceivable reason than because the culprit is a 'whole hog Jackson-man'. In reply, the Globe on December 3 recapitulated the grounds of the pardon stated in this order, quoting from William Hebb's and Thomas Swann's letters to [Jackson] on November 14 and 15. Cromwell wrote Globe editor F. P. Blair on December 17 that [Jackson] had 'been grossly imposed upon' concerning the facts of the case, and that Pettis was 'an imposter' and 'a most abandoned character' who had never intended to pay his board and whose presence had driven out his other boarders."

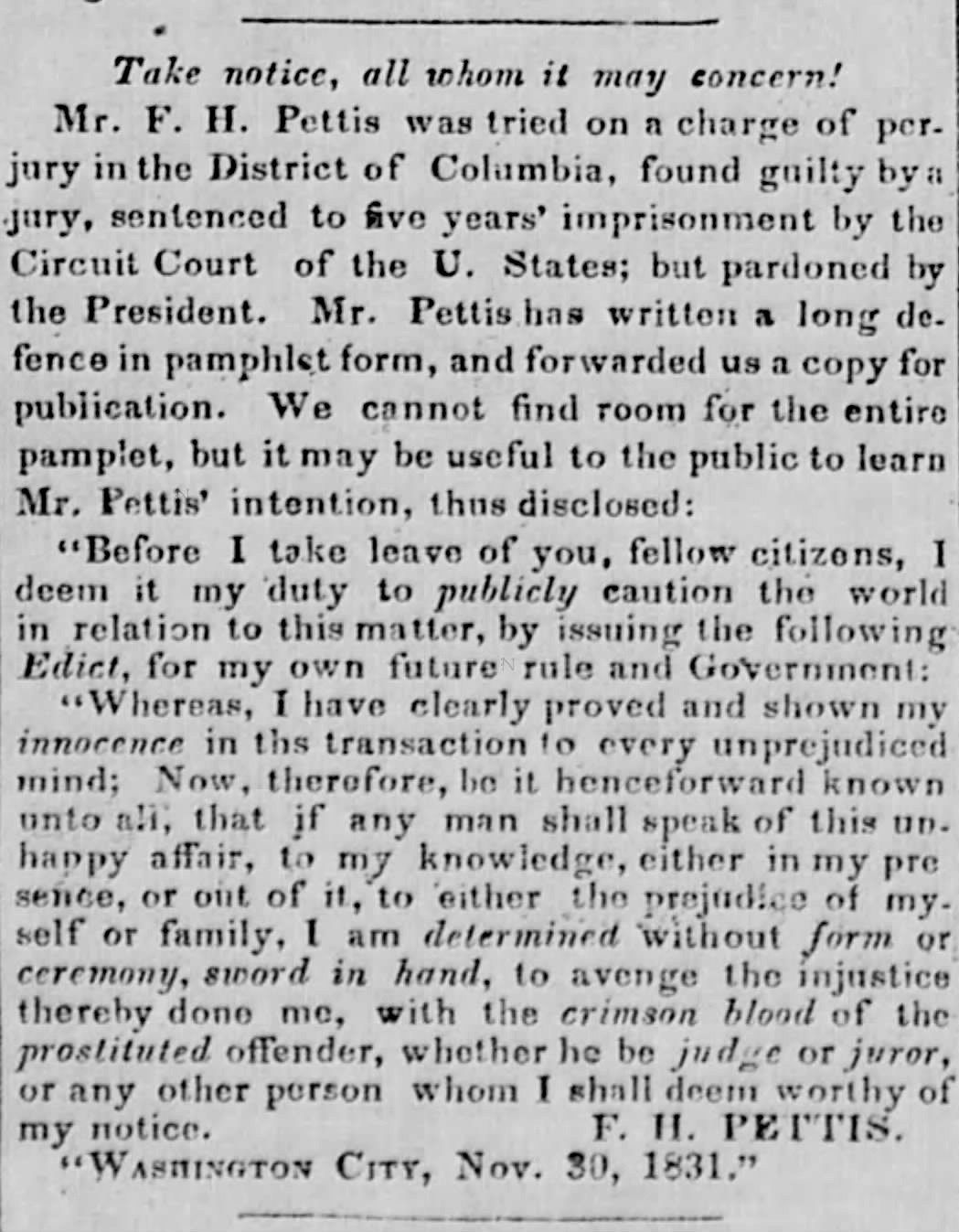
"Take notice, all whom it may concern!" Constitutional Whig, Richmond, Virginia, December 16, 1831: The editors of one Virginia newspaper did not seem to take Pettis' pamphlet very seriously

Following Pettis' conviction on perjury charges in the District of Columbia, sentence to prison, and pardon by a U.S. president, Pettis mailed out pamphlets promising to murder "without form or ceremony" anyone who mentioned the case in public. This pamphlet appears to be the seven-page document recorded in the Bibliotheca Americana as item w.61301 "PETTIS (F. H.) Letter to the People of the United States, Nov. 30, 1831. By F. H. Pettis. Washington. 1831." The American Antiquarian Society may hold a copy in their library in Worcester, Massachusetts.

== Slave catcher ==
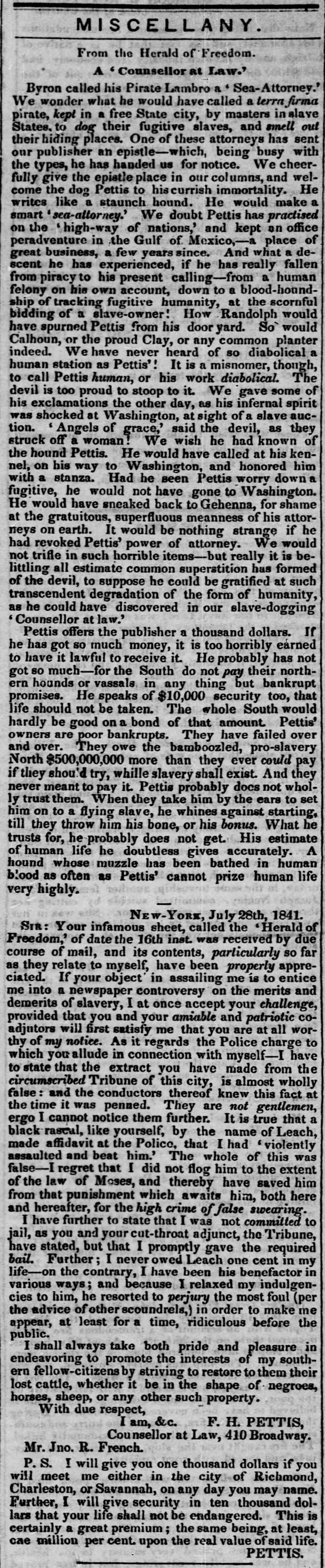
Abolitionist, newspaper editor, and future U.S. Representative John French takes the measure of Fontaine Pettis in his father-in-law's newspaper, Herald of Freedom (The Liberator, September 17, 1841)

Pettis' later career as a slave catcher took advantage of the nature of fugitive slave laws and in jurisdictional differences in the rights of individuals in various U.S. states. If Pettis got hold of a fugitive slave living in a free state, and could convince a court of that person's identity as escaped chattel, he was empowered to return them to that person's legal owner in a slave state. Thus, even reaching a "free state" like New York was no guarantee of liberty for a freedom-seeking American slave. As a rule, Pettis would advertise in Southern papers, instructing "masters who desired his services...to forward him power of attorney, a description of the runaway, 'and also a fee of $20'." If the slave was to be returned to his or her owner, that would cost an additional $100.

Pettis seemingly relocated to New York around 1833. He was advertising for clients the south as early as 1834, for example in a Richmond, Virginia newspaper, stating that "being generally known through the State, he deems references unnecessary...Persons in the South, who have, or may hereafter have, runaway slaves, expected to be in either N. York or Philadelphia, may find it to their advantage to send a minutely descriptive communication, post-paid, as above". In December 1834, "P. H." wrote a letter to The Liberator abolitionist newspaper criticizing Pettis, known from his advertisements, stating "I hope you will do all in your power to give Mr. Pettis the notoriety which he seeks, and to send his name to posterity with those of Woolfolk, Washington Robie, and Franklin & Armfield." The New York Committee of Vigiliance, a civil rights and abolition advocacy group led in part by grocer David Ruggles and later by Theodore Wright, considered Pettis a key member of what they called the New York Kidnappers Club. The group, nominally headed by New York City Recorder Richard Riker and Third Ward constable Tobias Boudinot, also included Daniel D. Nash (whom abolitionists identified as a "pimp for slave holders"), John Lyon, and another Virginian, Edward R. Waddy. As explained by historian Leslie Harris:

Nash, Lyon, Waddy, and Pettis acted individually or in concert as agents for slave owners, advertising their services in southern newspapers and seizing suspected fugitives on the streets of New York. They then appeared before any federal or state judge, or more likely the local magistrate and known southern sympathizer Riker, to offer oral or written proof that the person was a slave. If the judge believed the proof, the slave catcher took the person south. Anyone interfering with this process was liable to a five-hundred-dollar fine, a suit for injuries, or both.

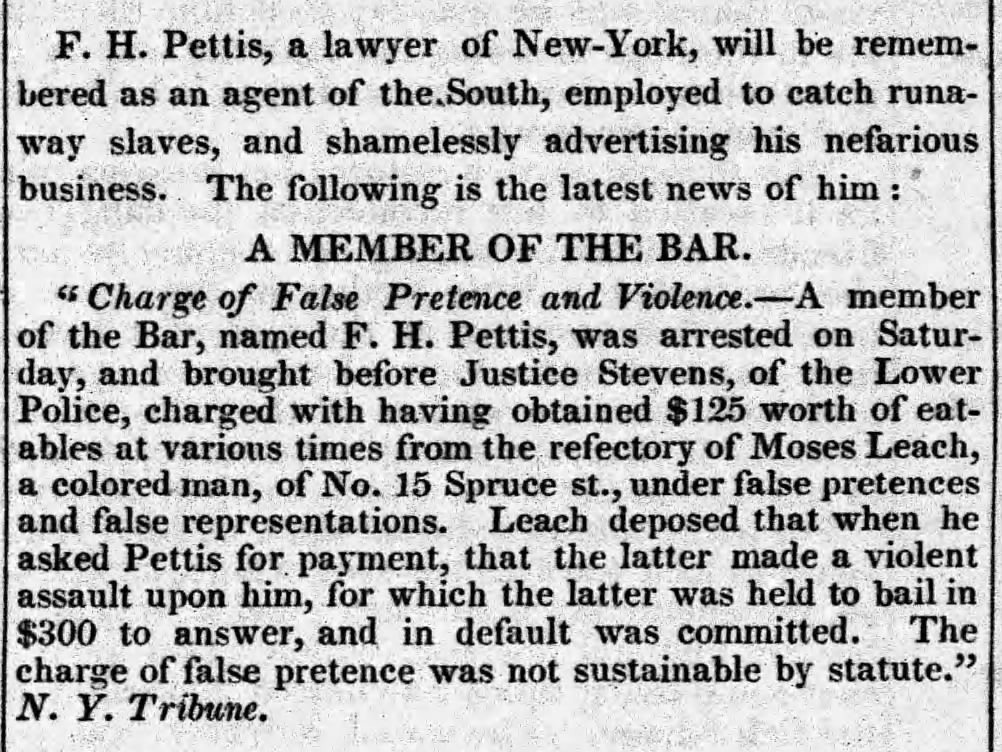
Pettis was known for "shamelessly advertising his nefarious business" and defaulted on $300 bail so was committed to jail (National Anti-Slavery Standard, July 15, 1841)

To some extent, Pettis was opportunistically exploiting Southern paranoia about a great Northern conspiracy against their interests. In the words of historian Calvin Schermerhorn, "To most white Southerners, abolitionists were the witches and terrorists of their age: malignant, ubiquitous, and utterly real." Pettis seems to have been acutely aware of this and by the 1840s was headlining his ads "ABOLITION" and advising his readers in the District of Columbia, "There are thousands of fugitive slaves in this city and its environs, and they continue to multiply rapidly. These being, at best, very unpopular cases in this quarter, (he having the Abolitionists, the flesh, and the devil, to contend with,) it will be necessary for those wishing to secure his services" to please send money for expenses. An 1842 article in the Green Bay Republican of Wisconsin suggested that Pettis was exploiting the anxieties of southern slave owners for his own gain, encouraging them to believe slave-stealing abolitionists were at work everywhere, but he promising could solve their problems if they would only send him US$20 (equivalent to $651.66 in 2024) in cash, from which he "has already raised a pretty handsome sum". Similarly, even as Pettis was advertising his services in the Alexandria Gazette newspaper of the District of Columbia, the paper was providing its readers with a general scam warning: "Putative slave catchers, the Gazette reported, informed slaveholders that their human property had been recaptured, but could not be returned until expenses were covered. Once paid, of course, the slaveholder never heard from the northerner again."

In 1841, New York refectory owner named Moses Leach was attacked by Pettis when Leach asked that he pay his past-due bill for $125 in meals. Pettis was arrested and charged with assault. The abolitionist press took notice.

== Later life ==
Throughout 1843, Pettis was marketing something called the "Nassau Principle of Water-Proving Cloth," offering a local license for the waterproofing process to all comers. Pettis was living in New York at the time of the 1850 census, at which time he was married to an Englishwoman named Sarah. Abolitionist Emily Pierson quoted from one of Pettis' slave-catcher ads in her 1851 novel Jamie Parker, the Fugitive. In 1854, the New York Daily Herald reported that F. H. Pettis of 35 Wall Street was a "stump candidate" for Congress. Pettis died in New York in 1858 and is buried in Green-Wood Cemetery.

== See also ==
- Bank War – Political struggle in the 19th-century United States

== See also ==
- List of people pardoned or granted clemency by the president of the United States
- Federal pardons in the United States
- Anti-Masonic Party – 1820s–1830s American political party
- Bibliography of slavery in the United States
- History of slavery in the United States by state
- Fugitive slaves in the United States
- Kidnapping into slavery in the United States
- Underground Railroad – Network for fugitive slaves in 19th-century U.S.
- The Chaneysville Incident – 1981 novel by David Bradley in which Pettis appears as a character
