= James Biddle =

American commodore

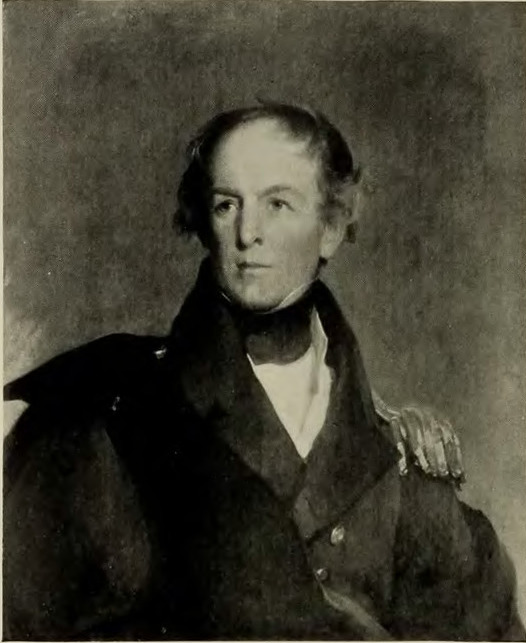
- portrait by Thomas Sully, 1839
- Born: February 18, 1783; Philadelphia
- Died: October 1, 1848; Philadelphia
- Education: University of Pennsylvania
- Occupations: Naval officer, soldier
- Father: Charles Biddle
- Relatives: Nicholas Biddle, Thomas Biddle, John Biddle, Richard Biddle

James Biddle (February 18, 1783 – October 1, 1848), of the Biddle family, brother of financier Nicholas Biddle and nephew of Capt. Nicholas Biddle, was an American commodore. His flagship was USS Columbus.

== Education and early career ==
Biddle was born in Philadelphia, where he attended the University of Pennsylvania. After graduating, he entered service in the United States Navy as a midshipman in 1800.

Retained in the navy reduction of 1801, Biddle served in the war against the Barbary pirates. The ship he was in, USS Philadelphia, struck rocks off Tripoli, and along with his commodore, William Bainbridge, he was kept imprisoned for 19 months.

During the War of 1812, Biddle was first lieutenant in USS Wasp. He was in command of the sloop USS Hornet in 1815 when she defeated HMS Penguin. In 1817, he was sent to the Columbia River in USS Ontario to formally take over the Oregon Country for the United States, which was completed in 1818.

After the war, Biddle performed various duties in the Gulf of Mexico, the South Atlantic, and the Mediterranean. In 1830, Biddle and US consul David Offly negotiated and concluded a treaty with the Sublime Porte. The treaty was later used by U.S. diplomats to claim extraterritorial privileges for U.S. citizens in the Ottoman Empire.

== Biddle and the USS Macedonian ==
In the early nineteenth century, the prevalence of yellow fever in the Caribbean "led to serious health problems" and alarmed the United States Navy as numerous deaths and sickness curtailed naval operations and destroyed morale. A tragic example occurred in May 1822 when the frigate USS Macedonian left Boston and became part of Commodore James Biddle's West Indies Squadron. Secretary of the Navy Smith Thompson had assigned the squadron to guard United States merchant shipping and suppress piracy. During their deployment seventy six of the Macedonian officers and men died. Seventy four of these deaths were attributed to yellow fever. Biddle reported another fifty two of his crew were on sick-list. In his report to the Secretary of the Navy, Biddle and Surgeon's Mate Dr. Charles Chase state the cause as "fever". As a consequence of this loss Biddle noted his squadron was forced to return to Norfolk Navy Yard early. The Macedonian crew upon arrival were provided medical care and quarantined at Craney Island. Biddle upset at the loss of his crew wrote Smith Thompson " how deeply my feelings have been afflicted at the disturbing mortality & sickness and …. I hope you will order an investigation into the cause of the sickness on board."

Biddle told Thompson the Macedonian had been improperly fitted out in Boston and while there, the frigate's hold was never properly cleaned and that the filth and debris he discovered in the hold had led to the fever. Biddle consequently brought charges against Commodore Isaac Hull then in command at the Boston Naval Yard. Medical testimony during a court of inquiry however supported the conclusion that a drastic change in temperatures, dampness and tropical climate were the proximate cause of the fever, and "Much to Biddle's chagrin the court of inquiry found Hull not guilty."

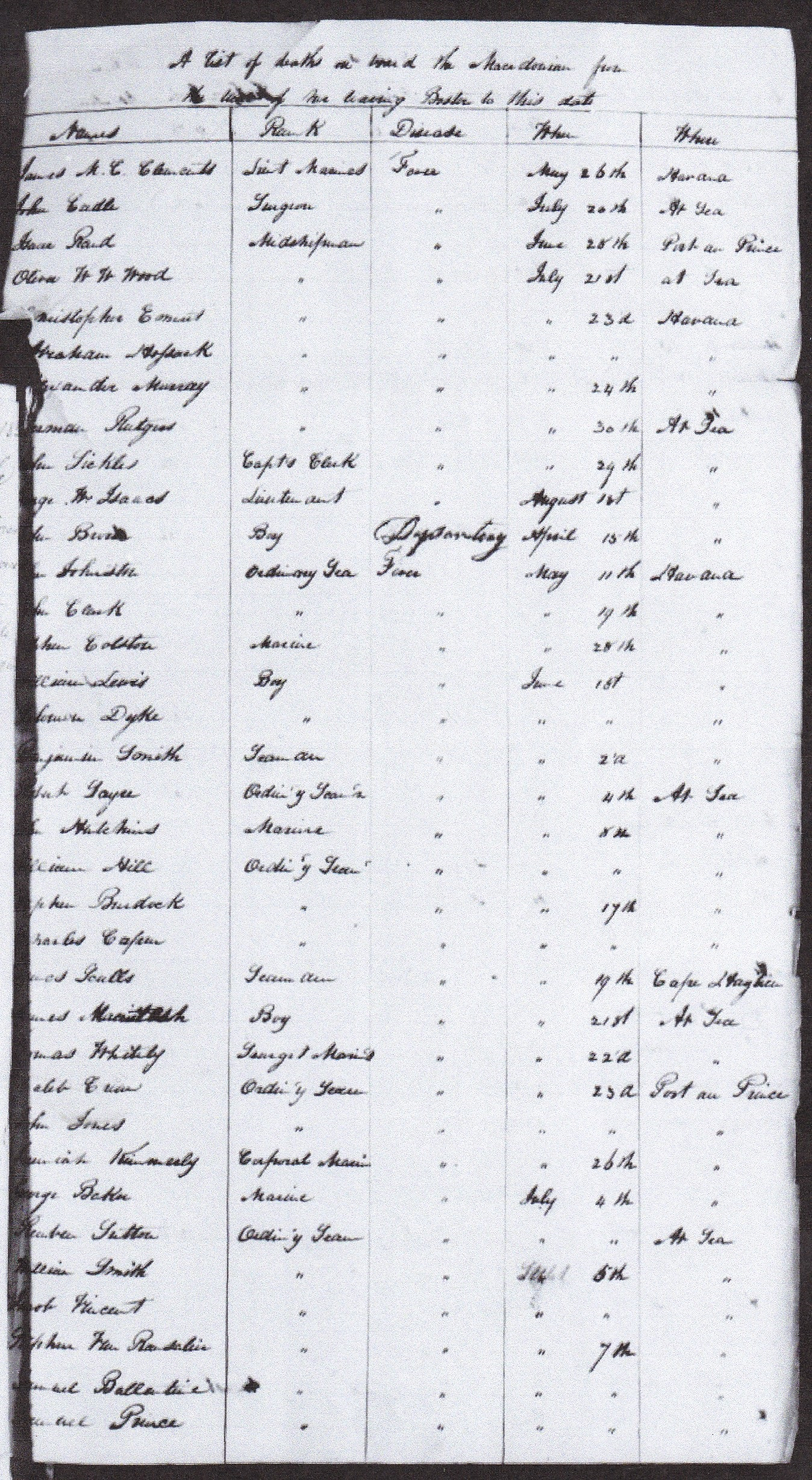
A page from Commodore James Biddle's list of the seventy six dead (seventy four of yellow fever) aboard the USS Macedonian dated 3 August 1822

== Expeditions to Asia ==
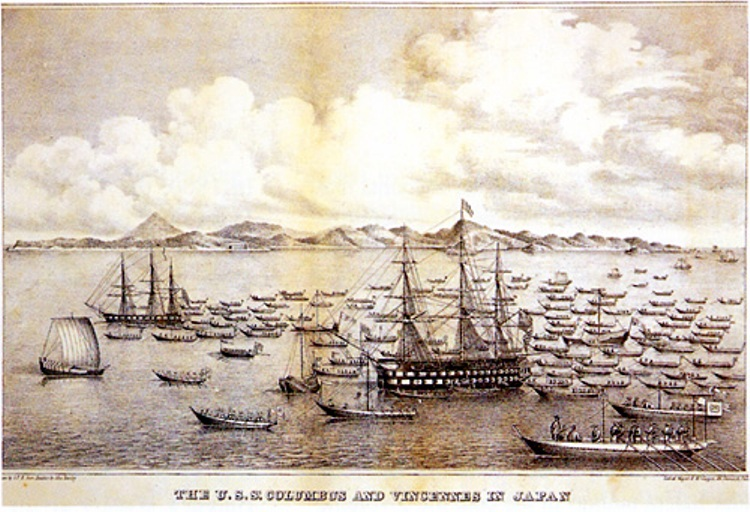
USS Vincennes and USS Columbus in Tokyo Bay, Japan, in July 1846

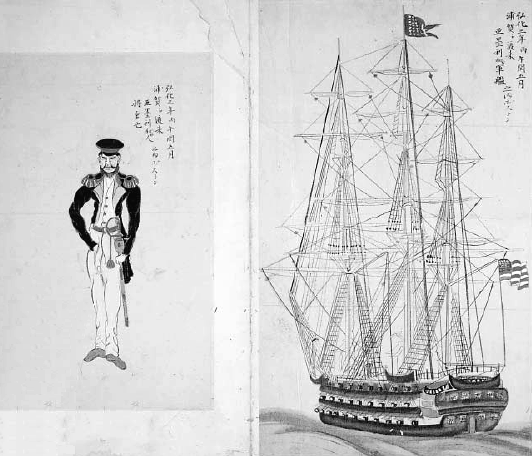
USS Vincennes and an American crewman in Edo Bay in 1846, depicted by a Japanese artist

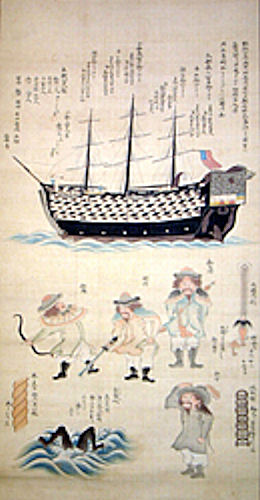
Ship of the Biddle fleet in Tokyo Bay in 1846

In December 1845, Biddle exchanged ratifications of the Treaty of Wanghia with China.

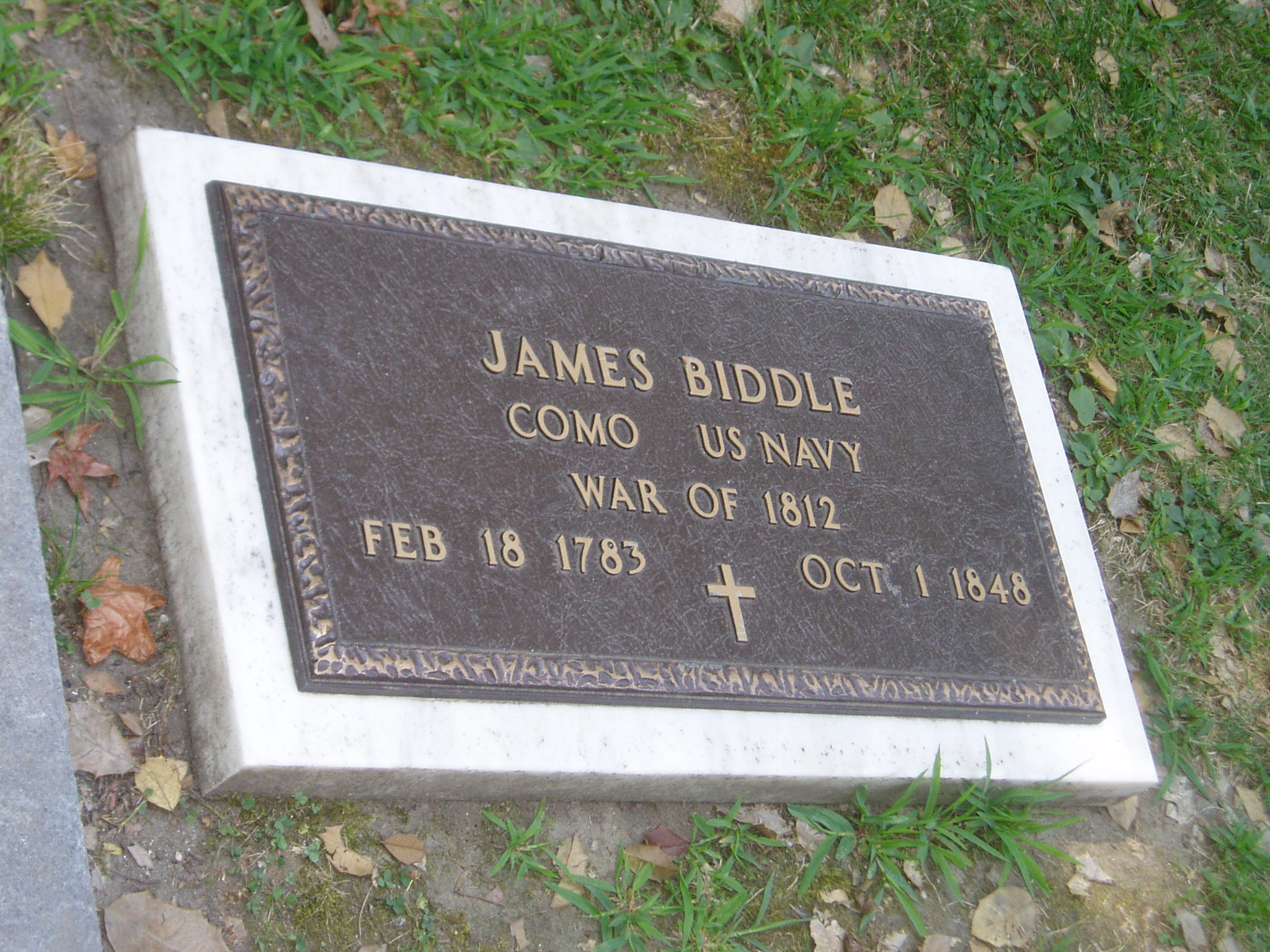
James Biddle's grave marker at Christ Church Burial Ground in Philadelphia

On July 20, 1846, he anchored with the two warships USS Columbus and USS Vincennes in Uraga Channel at the mouth to Edo Bay in an attempt to open up Japan to trade with the United States, but was ultimately unsuccessful. Biddle delivered his request that Japan agree to a similar treaty to that which had just been negotiated with China. A few days later a Japanese junk approached Biddle's flagship, and requested his presence on board their ship to receive the Tokugawa shogunate's official response. Biddle was reluctant at first, but eventually agreed. As Biddle attempted to board the Japanese ship, he misunderstood the instructions of one of the samurai guards and was physically knocked back by the guard who then drew his sword. Biddle retreated to his flagship. The Japanese officials apologized for the mishap. Biddle eventually received the shogunate's response, and was told that Japan forbade all commerce and communication with foreign nations besides that of the Dutch; also, he was informed that all foreign affairs were conducted through Nagasaki, and that his ships should leave Uraga immediately.

Seven years later, Commodore Matthew Perry did the task with four warships. Perry was well aware of Biddle's reception, and strove to make sure that he would not be treated in the same manner.

Biddle died in Philadelphia, and is buried at Christ Church Burial Ground in the family plot.

== See also ==
- Closed Japan

Military offices
Preceded by Foxhall A. Parker, Sr.	Commander, East India Squadron; 21 April 1845–6 March 1848	Succeeded by William Shubrick
