= Henry Marie Brackenridge =

American lawyer and politician

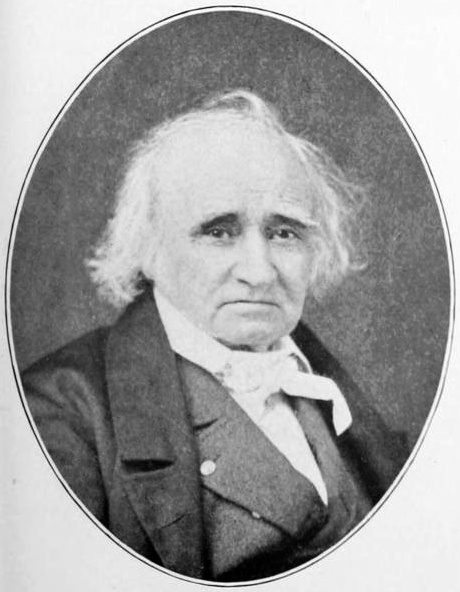

Member of the U.S. House of Representatives from Pennsylvania's 22nd district
- In office October 13, 1840 – March 3, 1841
- Preceded by: Richard Biddle
- Succeeded by: William W. Irwin

Personal details
- Born: May 11, 1786 Pittsburgh, Pennsylvania
- Died: January 18, 1871 (aged 84)
- Party: Whig

Henry Marie Brackenridge (May 11, 1786 – January 18, 1871) was an American writer, lawyer, judge, superintendent, and U.S. Congressman from Pennsylvania.

Born in Pittsburgh in 1786, he was educated by his father, the writer and judge Hugh Henry Brackenridge, private tutors, and at the Pittsburgh Academy, now known as the University of Pittsburgh, before attending a French academy at Ste. Genevieve, Missouri. He studied law and was admitted to the Pennsylvania bar in 1806, then practiced in Somerset, Pennsylvania.

Brackenridge subsequently moved to St. Louis, Missouri, where he was a lawyer and journalist. In 1811, he became the first recorded tourist to present-day South Dakota, hosted by fur trader Manuel Lisa.

Henry was appointed deputy attorney general and district judge of Louisiana in 1812. He played an intelligence role during the War of 1812, and in 1814 published a history of the war. In 1817 he was appointed secretary of a mission to South America.

He was elected a member of the American Antiquarian Society in 1818. In 1821, Brackenridge entered the diplomatic service of General Andrew Jackson, who was the new commissioner of Florida.

His influence led him to serve as U.S. judge for Florida from 1821–1832. When President John Quincy Adams established the Naval Live Oak Area on January 18, 1829, he lived on the property and experimented with cultivating live oak trees for shipbuilding as the first federal forester in America.

He returned to Pennsylvania in 1832 and became owner of a large tract of land upon which he founded the town of Tarentum near the Allegheny River, where Brackenridge honours his legacy.

He was elected as a Whig to the 26th United States Congress to fill the vacancy caused by the resignation of Richard Biddle, and served from October 13, 1840–March 3, 1841. He was a perennial candidate in 1840.

After politics, Brackenridge pursued literature until his death in Pittsburgh on January 18, 1871. He is buried in Prospect Cemetery in Brackenridge, Pennsylvania.

U.S. House of Representatives
Preceded by Richard Biddle	Member of the U.S. House of Representatives from Pennsylvania's 22nd congressional district 1840–1841	Succeeded by William W. Irwin
