= Richard Biddle =

American author and politician

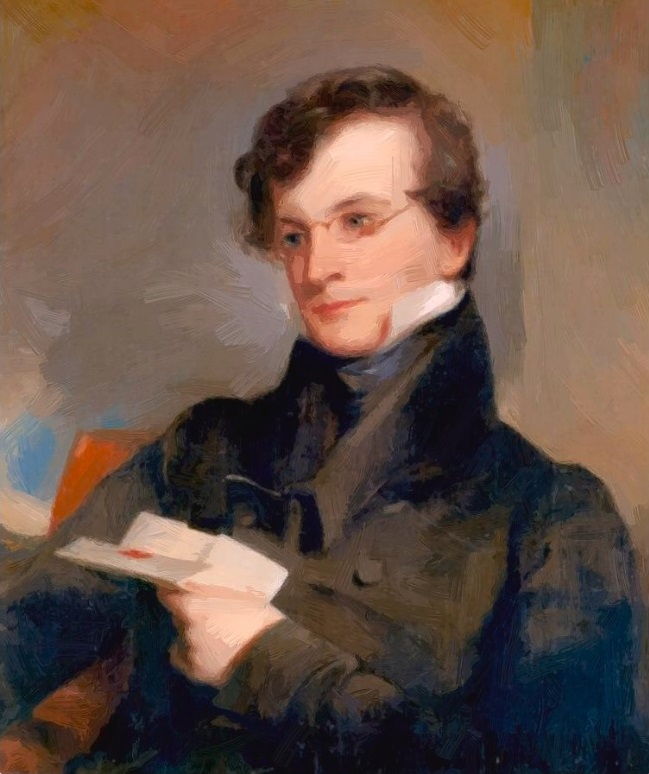
- Portrait by Thomas Sully, circa 1828. Currently owned by the Carnegie Museum of Art.

Member of the U.S. House of Representatives from Pennsylvania's 22nd district
- In office March 4, 1837 – July 21, 1840
- Preceded by: Harmar Denny
- Succeeded by: Henry Marie Brackenridge

Personal details
- Born: March 25, 1796 Philadelphia, Pennsylvania
- Died: July 6, 1847 (aged 51) Pittsburgh, Pennsylvania
- Party: Anti-Masonic
- Parent(s): Charles and Hannah Biddle
- Relatives: See Biddle family

Richard Biddle (March 25, 1796 – July 6, 1847) was an American writer, politician and lawyer. He served as a member of the U.S. House of Representatives from 1837 until 1840.

== Biography ==
Biddle was born on March 25, 1796, in Philadelphia, Pennsylvania. He was the brother of financier Nicholas Biddle, nephew of Congressman Edward Biddle and uncle of Congressman Charles John Biddle. He received a classical education, graduated from the University of Pennsylvania in 1811, and was admitted to the bar, practicing law in Pittsburgh.

He went to England in 1827, and remained three years, publishing while there a critical Review of Captain Basil Hall's Travels in North America. He also published A Memoir of Sebastian Cabot, with a Review of the History of Maritime Discovery (London, 1831).

Biddle was twice elected to Congress, as an Anti-Mason, serving from March 4, 1837, until his resignation on July 21, 1840.

Biddle died on July 6, 1847, in Pittsburgh, Pennsylvania.

== Bibliography ==
- Keller, William F. (1956). The Nation's Advocate: Henry Marie Brackenridge and Young America. Pittsburgh: University of Pittsburgh Press.

U.S. House of Representatives
Preceded by Harmar Denny	Member of the U.S. House of Representatives from Pennsylvania's 22nd congressional district 1837–1840	Succeeded by Henry Marie Brackenridge
