= James Irvine (Pennsylvania politician) =

American politician

Member of the Pennsylvania State Senate
- In office 1795–1799

Member of the Pennsylvania General Assembly
- In office 1785–1786

6th Vice-President of Pennsylvania
- In office November 6, 1784 – October 10, 1785
- President: John Dickinson
- Preceded by: James Ewing
- Succeeded by: Charles Biddle

Personal details
- Born: August 4, 1735 Philadelphia, Province of Pennsylvania
- Died: April 28, 1819 (aged 83) Philadelphia, Pennsylvania, U.S.
- Party: Constitutionalist
- Profession: soldier, politician

James Irvine (August 4, 1735 – April 28, 1819) was a Pennsylvania soldier and politician of the Colonial, Revolutionary, and Post-Revolutionary periods. He was an officer of the Continental Army, a member of the Pennsylvania General Assembly, and Vice-President of Pennsylvania (a position comparable to Lieutenant Governor).

== Early life ==
James Irvine was born in Philadelphia, Province of Pennsylvania, the son of George Irvine and Mary Rush. George Irvine had immigrated to the Colonies from Ireland.

== Military career ==
As a young man Irvine worked as a hatter, but in 1760 he enrolled in Samuel Atlee's provincial Pennsylvania unit and served in the French and Indian War. He spent most of his time along Pennsylvania's northern frontier. In 1763 he was promoted to captain. The following year, during Pontiac's Rebellion, he served with Henry Bouquet's expedition into the Ohio Country.

In the fall of 1775 Irvine was commissioned a lieutenant colonel in the 1st Pennsylvania Battalion of the Continental Army. He served in Virginia and Canada, and was promoted to colonel in Pennsylvania's 9th Regiment in late 1776; he was then given command of the 2nd Regiment. Irvine resigned, believing that he should have been promoted to general. However, a few months later he was commissioned a brigadier general in the Pennsylvania militia.

After returning to the battlefield Irvine was captured by the British in a skirmish at Chestnut Hill, near Philadelphia, on December 5, 1777. He suffered neck injuries and lost three of the fingers on his left hand in the fight. He was held prisoner by the British for nearly four years, first in New York and then in Flushing. He was released June 1, 1781. He was active in planning the defense of Philadelphia against suspected British attack.

After the war, he held the rank of major general in the Pennsylvania militia from 1782 to 1793.

== Political career ==
Irvine served on the Supreme Executive Council of the Commonwealth of Pennsylvania, from 1782 to 1785, representing the City of Philadelphia. His party affiliation was Constitutionalist. On November 6, 1784 he defeated John Neville in the election for the Vice-Presidency of Pennsylvania, a position analogous to the modern office of Lieutenant Governor. He resigned the office on October 10, 1785 and was succeeded by Charles Biddle. No reason for his resignation appears in the Minutes of the Executive Council. Irvine served in the Pennsylvania General Assembly during the 1785–1786 term. In 1786 the Constitutionalist party lost much of its support and Irvine's political career suffered. He did, however, serve in the State Senate from 1795 to 1799.

As Vice-President Irvine served as an ex officio member of the Board of Trustees of the University of Pennsylvania, and continued as an elected Trustee after leaving office, serving until 1791. He was also an original Trustee of Dickinson College in Carlisle, Pennsylvania, and was considered to be a firm supporter of education.

== Death ==
James Irvine died in Philadelphia on April 28, 1819, following a long illness.

Political offices
Preceded by William Moore	Member, Supreme Executive Council of Pennsylvania, representing the City of Philadelphia; October 14, 1782 – October 17, 1785	Succeeded by Benjamin Franklin
Preceded by James Ewing	Vice-President of Pennsylvania; November 6, 1784 – October 10, 1785	Succeeded by Charles Biddle
