= Charles Biddle =

American politician

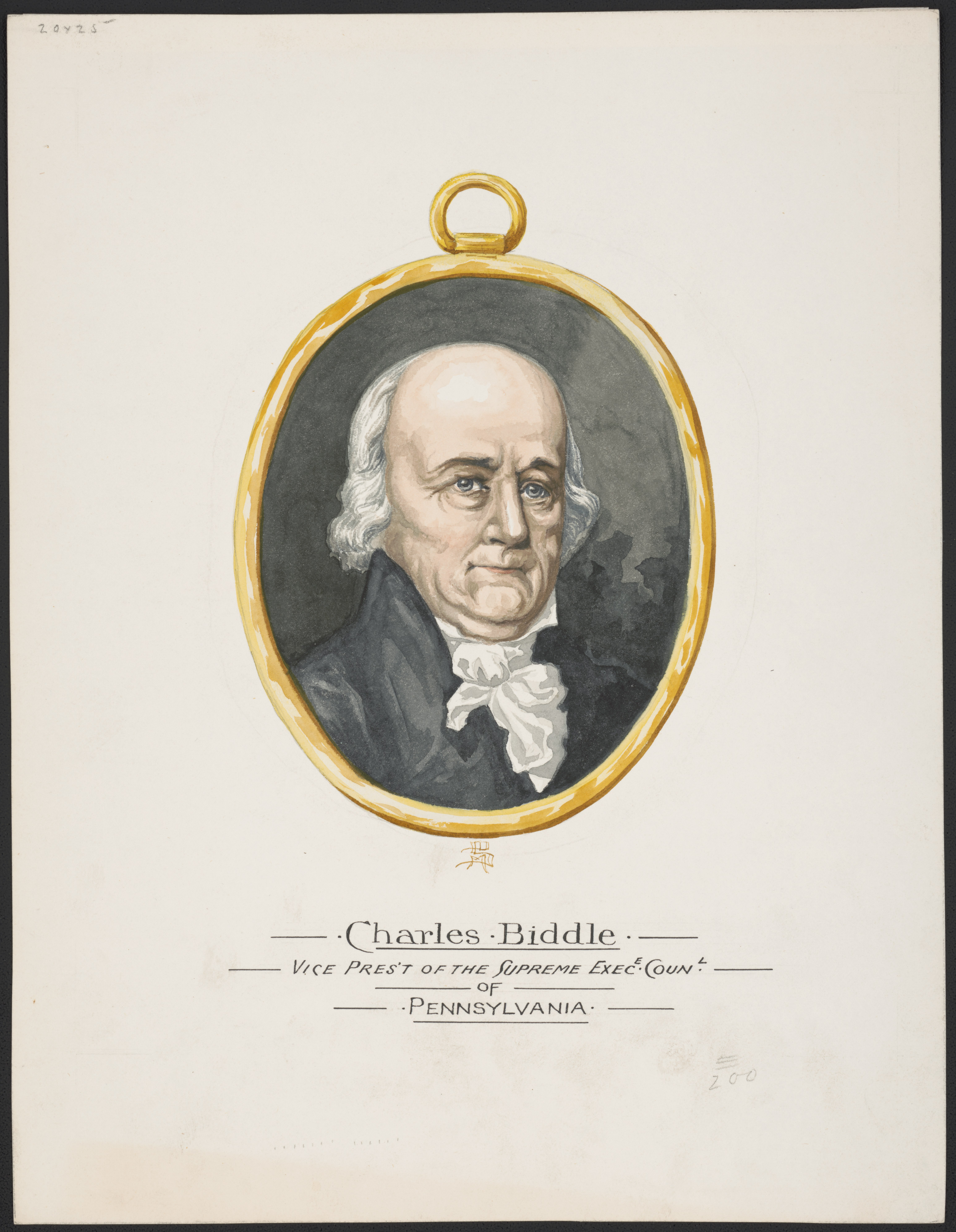

7th Vice-President of Pennsylvania
- In office 10 October 1785 – 31 October 1787
- President: John Dickinson; Benjamin Franklin
- Preceded by: James Irvine
- Succeeded by: Peter Muhlenberg

Personal details
- Born: December 24, 1745 Philadelphia, Province of Pennsylvania, British America
- Died: April 4, 1821 (aged 75) Philadelphia, Pennsylvania, U.S.
- Spouse: Hannah Shepard (m. 1778–1821)
- Children: 10, including James, Nicholas, Thomas, John, Richard
- Parent(s): William Biddle III; Mary Scull Biddle
- Relatives: See Biddle family

Charles Biddle (December 24, 1745 – April 4, 1821) was a Pennsylvania statesman and a member of the prominent Biddle family of Philadelphia.

== Early life ==
Biddle was born to a wealthy old Quaker family on December 24, 1745, in Philadelphia, Province of Pennsylvania in what was then British America. He was the son of William Biddle, 3rd (1698–1756) and Mary (née Scull) Biddle (1709–1789). His siblings included: Lydia Biddle, who married William Macfunn; John ”Jacky” Biddle, who married Sophia Boone; Edward Biddle, a lawyer, soldier, delegate to the Continental Congress, who married Elizabeth Ross, sister of George Ross; Charles Biddle, and Nicholas Biddle, Revolutionary War Navy captain.

As a youth, Biddle was a schoolmate and close friend of Mathias Aspden and Founding Father Benjamin Rush.

== Career ==
=== American Revolutionary War ===
During the American Revolutionary War, Biddle was a captain in the merchant service and participated in the work around of the British fleet's blockade of American ports. He volunteered in the Quaker Light Infantry and, in 1778, he served under his brother, Commodore Nicholas Biddle, aboard the USS Randolph.

=== Political career ===
Biddle served as Vice President of Pennsylvania, also known as Lieutenant Governor of Pennsylvania, from October 10, 1785, until October 31, 1787. He served under John Dickinson and Benjamin Franklin and hosted George Washington.

During his term, he was an ex officio trustee of the University of the State of Pennsylvania (now the University of Pennsylvania). He was a member of the Pennsylvania Senate from 1810 to 1814. He also was an associate of Aaron Burr, having introduced Burr to his wife Theodosia shortly after the death of her first husband, Jacques Marcus Prevost.

Although Biddle vacated his seat at Council on October 13, 1787, the Commonwealth of Pennsylvania records that his Vice-Presidential term extended to October 31, the date of the next Presidential and Vice-Presidential elections. Biddle was elected Secretary of the Council on October 23.

== Personal life ==
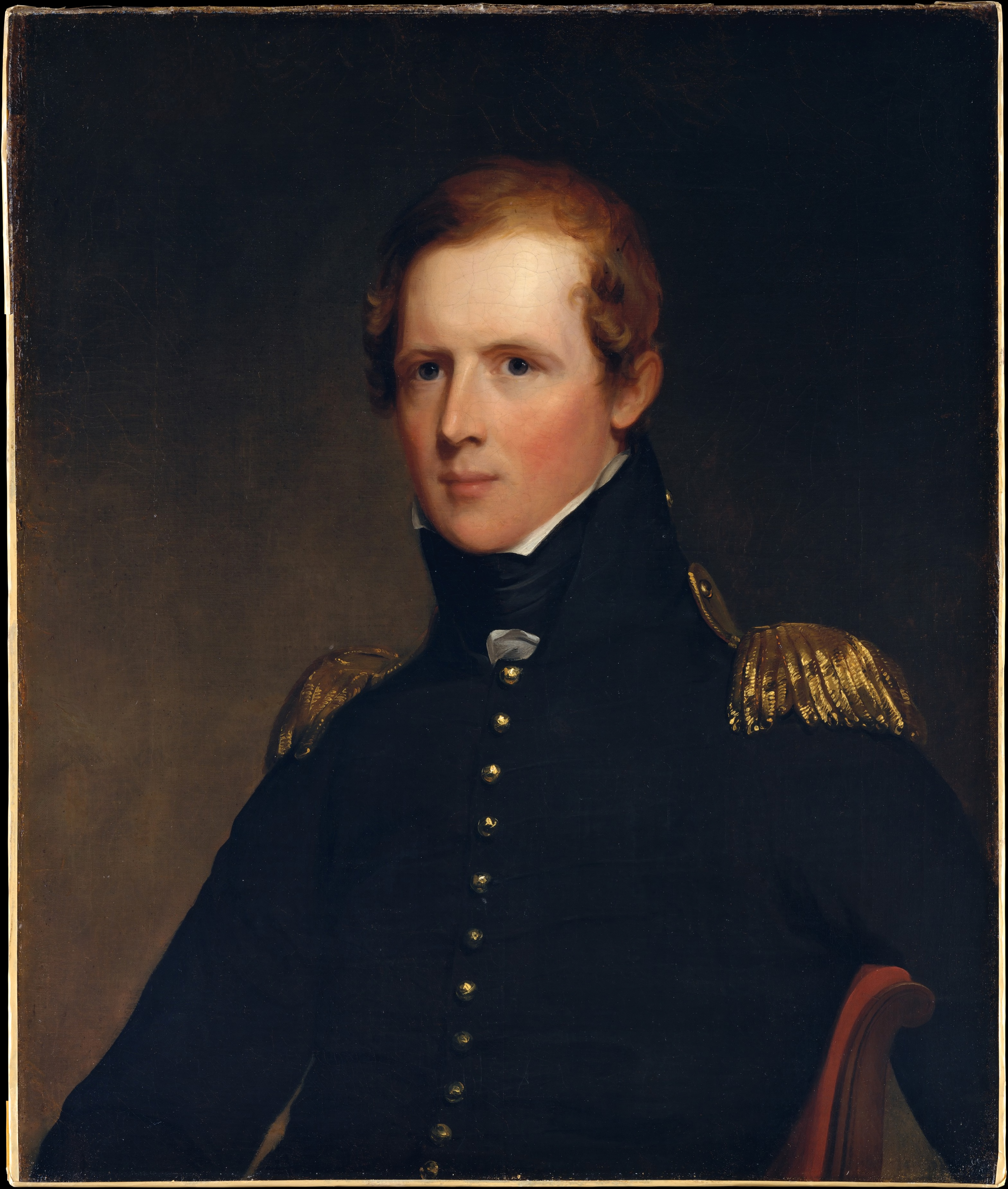
An 1818 portrait of John Biddle, Biddle's son, by Thomas Sully

On November 24, 1778, he was married to Hannah Shepard (d. 1825), the daughter of merchant Jacob Shepard and Sara (née Lewis) Shepard, in Beaufort, North Carolina. The Biddle family had a summer home outside of Philadelphia that was furnished sumptuously with English furniture and paintings. Together, they were the parents of ten children, including:

- Mary Biddle (d. 1854), who married John Gideon Biddle (1793–1826), the fourth son of Clement Biddle, in 1820.
- Nicholas Biddle (b. 1779), who died in infancy.
- William Shephard Biddle (1781–1835), who married Circe Deroneray. After her death, he married Elizabeth Bordeon Hopkinson, daughter of Joseph Hopkinson.
- James Biddle (1783–1848), a commodore with the U.S. Navy who died unmarried.
- Edward Biddle (1784–1800), a midshipman with the U.S. Navy who died at sea.
- Nicholas Biddle (1786–1844), president of the Second Bank of the United States who married Jane Craig.
- Charles Biddle Jr. (1787–1836), who married Anna H. Stokes in 1808.
- Ann Biddle (1788-1789)
- Thomas Biddle (1790–1831), a War of 1812 hero who died after a duel with a Missouri Congressman over a perceived insult to his brother Nicholas. He married M. Ann Mulllanphy.
- John Biddle (1792–1859), Michigan politician who married Eliza Falconer Bradish.
- Richard Biddle (1796–1847), a U.S. Representative who married Ann Anderson.
- Ann Biddle (1800-1863), who married Francis Hopkinson (1796-1870), the son of Joseph Hopkinson in 1829.

Biddle died on April 4, 1821, in Philadelphia, Pennsylvania. His widow died almost four years later on January 4, 1825.

== See also ==
- Biddle family

Political offices
Preceded by Sebastian Levan	Member, Supreme Executive Council of Pennsylvania, representing Berks County; 30 October 1784 – 13 October 1787	Succeeded by James Read
Preceded by James Irvine	Vice-President of Pennsylvania; 10 October 1785 – 31 October 1787	Succeeded by Peter Muhlenberg
