= Thomas Biddle =

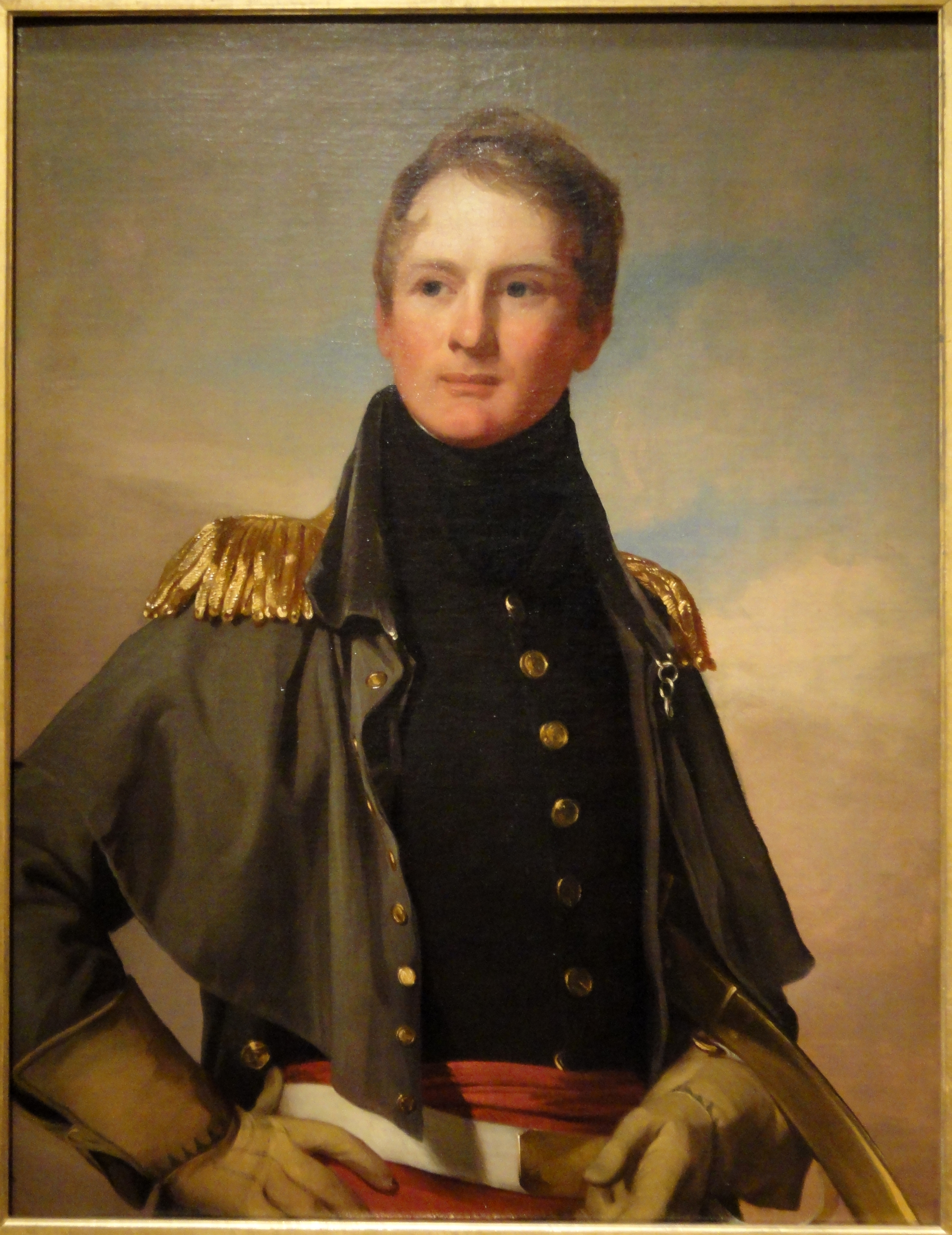
- Major Thomas Biddle, by Thomas Wilcocks Sully and Thomas Sully, 1832
- Born: November 21, 1790; Philadelphia, Pennsylvania, US
- Died: August 29, 1831 (aged 40); St. Louis, Missouri, US
- Cause of death: Gunshot during a duel
- Resting place: Calvary Cemetery (St. Louis)
- Occupation: U.S. Army officer
- Known for: War of 1812 hero, duel with Spencer Pettis
- Spouse: Ann Mullanphy
- Parent(s): Charles and Hannah Biddle
- Relatives: See Biddle family

Thomas Biddle (November 21, 1790 – August 29, 1831) was an American military hero during the War of 1812. Biddle is known for having been killed in a duel with Missouri Congressman Spencer Pettis.

== Early life ==
Thomas Biddle was born into the powerful Biddle family in Philadelphia, Pennsylvania, one of ten children born to Charles and Hannah (Shephard) Biddle.

His father Charles was a Revolutionary War officer and vice-president of the Supreme Executive Council of the Commonwealth of Pennsylvania. Two of Thomas' brothers, James and Edward, had served in the U.S. Navy, while brother John was a U.S. Army officer before becoming an early mayor of Detroit, Michigan. Older brother Nicholas Biddle was president of the Second Bank of the United States.

== War of 1812 and post-war ==
During the War of 1812, Thomas Biddle was commissioned, as a captain of artillery, under Zebulon Pike. He saw action, at Fort George and Stoney Creek and was wounded, at Fort Erie. Biddle was wounded again at the Battle of Lundy's Lane, where he distinguished himself by capturing the only British cannon seized in the clash. It would later be preserved and displayed in Washington, D.C. In 1814 Biddle was brevetted to the rank of Major and became an aide for George Izard. In 1819, he accompanied the Yellowstone Expedition up the Missouri River to the vicinity of present-day Omaha, Nebraska. In August, 1820 he was transferred to St. Louis, Missouri, where he served as U.S. Army paymaster.

On September 1, 1823, Thomas Biddle married Ann Mullanphy, daughter of Missouri's first millionaire, John Mullanphy. Now serving as the director of the St. Louis branch of the Bank of the United States, the Biddles were financially well-off and at the peak of young St. Louis society, often hosting lavish dinner parties for business and political luminaries. It was their involvement in local politics that would have deadly consequences, however.

== Politics ==
What transpired on August 27, 1831, had its roots many months earlier. Missouri's Jacksonian Democrats, led by Senator Thomas Hart Benton, engaged in a number of debates, during the 1830 Congressional election season, that saw many fiery speeches, on issues of banking, currency stability, and western land use. During one of those speeches, Congressman Spencer Darwin Pettis, a Benton acolyte, harshly criticized Biddle's brother Nicholas, President of the Second Bank of the United States.

A war of words soon ensued, in the St. Louis press, in the form of letters to the editor. In one such letter, Thomas Biddle called Pettis "a dish of skimmed milk", to which Pettis responded by questioning Thomas Biddle's manhood. Pettis was reelected to U.S. Congress, in November, 1830, but the feud between the two refused to die. Things escalated dramatically on July 9, 1831, when Biddle heard that an ill Pettis was resting in a St. Louis hotel. Biddle attacked Pettis in his room, beating him severely with a cowhide whip until other hotel guests intervened.

Fearing that he might be attacked again during his recovery, Congressman Pettis had Major Biddle arrested on a peace warrant. At the court proceedings, Pettis attempted to draw a pistol with the intention of shooting Biddle, but was restrained by friends. At this, Biddle stated that he would promptly accept any challenge that the Congressman cared to issue.

=== Affair of honor and death ===
After sufficient time to recover from the beating, on August 21, 1831, Congressman Pettis challenged Biddle to a duel, which was promptly accepted. As the challenged party, Biddle chose the weapons and distance. Being nearsighted, he chose pistols at the unusually close distance of 5 feet (1.5 m). This meant that each man would take at most one or two steps before turning to fire, with their pistols perhaps even overlapping, depending on arm length. In short, it was suicidal and seen as a ploy by some observers and later historians to make Pettis back down and thus lose the affair of honor without bloodshed.

At five p.m. on August 27, 1831, Biddle and Pettis, along with their seconds, Major Benjamin O'Fallon and Captain Martin Thomas, respectively, met on Bloody Island, a small sandbar located in the Mississippi River between St. Louis and the Illinois shore. Dueling was illegal in both states, but authorities tended to turn a blind eye to this neutral ground. As large crowds watched from the St. Louis riverfront, Biddle and Pettis obeyed the commands to step, turn, and fire. Both men fell with mortal wounds. Before being carried off the island, both men were overheard to forgive each other for the altercation.

Pettis died the next day, while Biddle lingered on until August 29. Both men were buried with full honors, eulogized for choosing death before dishonor. The funerals for both men were said to be the largest ever held in St. Louis in the 19th century. As a war hero, Thomas Biddle was buried with full military rites at Jefferson Barracks in St. Louis. Some years later, he was disinterred to be buried with his wife in a crypt at Calvary Cemetery in St. Louis.
