= Priestly H. McBride =

American judge (1796–1869)

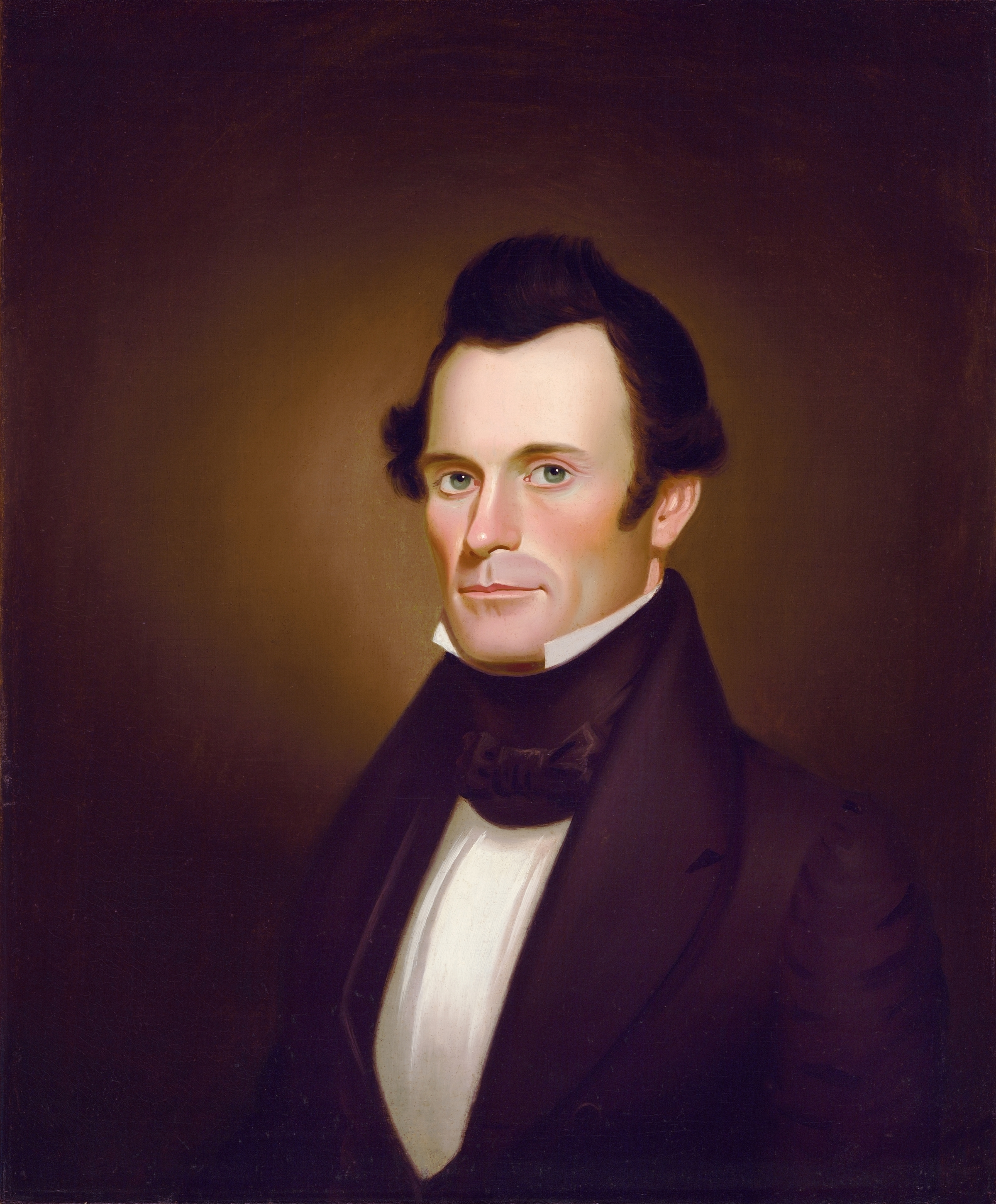
Judge Priestly H. McBride painted by George Caleb Bingham, c. 1837

Priestly Harvey McBride c. 1796 – May 21, 1869; erroneously reported in some sources as Priestly Haggin McBride) was a justice of the Supreme Court of Missouri from April 4, 1845 to March 7, 1848.

Born in about 1796 near Harrodsburg, Kentucky, McBride was educated in law, and thereafter moved to Missouri, settling in Columbia, Missouri, around 1825. There, he "became prominent in politics as an unbending Democrat", and in 1829, Governor John Miller appointed McBride to be the Missouri Secretary of State. On November 20, 1830, Miller appointed by McBride to a circuit judge seat for the Missouri Second Judicial Circuit, where McBride served until 1845.

McBride was appointed to the Missouri Supreme Court in 1845, by Governor John Cummins Edwards, who had previously succeeded McBride as Secretary of State. While on the court, it was noted that "the conclusions announced in his opinions were generally well considered", but that "he greatly impaired their value in seldom stating the line of reasoning by which they were supported". His office was vacated by the Amendment of 1848, and he retired to private life and the management of a large farm near Paris, in Monroe County.

Political offices
| Preceded by George Tompkins | Justice of the Missouri Supreme Court; 1845–1848 | Succeeded by Seat abolished. |
