= Nicholas Biddle =

American financier (1786–1844)

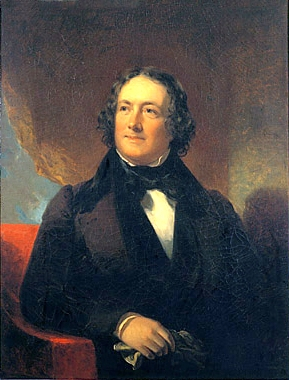
- Portrait by William Inman, c. 1830s

President of the Second Bank of the United States
- In office January 6, 1823 – March 3, 1836
- President: James Monroe; John Quincy Adams; Andrew Jackson
- Preceded by: Langdon Cheves
- Succeeded by: Position abolished

Member of the Pennsylvania State Senate from the 1st district
- In office December 7, 1813 – December 5, 1815
- Preceded by: John Barclay
- Succeeded by: William Maghee

Personal details
- Born: January 8, 1786 Philadelphia, Pennsylvania, US
- Died: February 27, 1844 (aged 58) Andalusia, Bucks County, Pennsylvania, US
- Party: Whig
- Spouse: Jane Craig (m. 1811)
- Children: 6, including Charles
- Parent(s): Charles and Hannah Biddle
- Relatives: See Biddle family
- Education: University of Pennsylvania; College of New Jersey
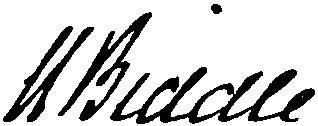
- Signature

Nicholas Biddle (January 8, 1786 – February 27, 1844) was an American financier who served as the third and last president of the Second Bank of the United States (chartered 1816–1836). Throughout his life Biddle worked as an editor, diplomat, author, and politician who served in both houses of the Pennsylvania state legislature. He is best known as the chief opponent of Andrew Jackson in the Bank War.

Born into the Biddle family of Philadelphia, young Nicholas worked for a number of prominent officials, including John Armstrong Jr. and James Monroe. In the Pennsylvania state legislature, he defended the utility of a national bank in the face of Jeffersonian criticisms. From 1823 to 1836, Biddle served as president of the Second Bank, during which time he exercised power over the nation's money supply and interest rates, seeking to prevent economic crises.

With prodding from Henry Clay and the Bank's major stockholders, Biddle engineered a bill in Congress to renew the Bank's federal charter in 1832. The bill passed Congress and headed to President Andrew Jackson's desk. Jackson, who expressed deep hostility to most banks, vetoed the measure, ratcheting up tensions in a major political controversy known as the Bank War. When Jackson transferred the federal government's deposits from the Second Bank to several state banks, Biddle raised interest rates, causing a mild economic recession. The federal charter expired in 1836, before the Panic of 1837, but the bank continued to operate with a Pennsylvania state charter until its ultimate collapse in 1841.

== Ancestry and early life ==
Nicholas Biddle was born into a prominent family in Philadelphia, in the Commonwealth of Pennsylvania, on January 8, 1786. Ancestors of the Biddle family had immigrated to the Pennsylvania colony along with the famous Quaker proprietor, William Penn, and subsequently fought in the pre-Revolutionary colonial struggles. Young Nicholas's preparatory education was received at an academy in Philadelphia, where his progress was so rapid that he entered the class of 1799 at the University of Pennsylvania. At thirteen years old, Biddle had completed his coursework, but was not allowed to graduate due to his age. His parents accordingly sent him to Princeton (then the “College of New Jersey”) where he entered the sophomore class, and graduated in 1801 as valedictorian, dividing the first honor of the class with his only rival. While at Princeton, Biddle wrote an essay against the abolition of slavery, arguing that, if slaves were freed, they would suffer without the “support” of plantation owners, “as no nation is more lenient towards its slaves than America.”

Biddle was offered an official position before he had even finished his law studies. As secretary to former Revolutionary War officer and delegate to the Continental Congress, John Armstrong Jr., he went abroad in 1804 and was in Paris when Napoleon Bonaparte was crowned as emperor of the new French Empire. He kept his original coronation ticket, which eventually ended up in his family’s souvenir album. Afterwards he participated in an audit related to the Louisiana Purchase, acquiring his first experience in financial affairs. Biddle traveled extensively through Europe as secretary for James Monroe, who was then serving as the United States minister to the Court of St. James. In Great Britain, Biddle took part in a conversation with Cambridge University professors involving comparisons between the modern Greek dialect and that of Homer; a conversation that captured Monroe's attention.

In 1807, Biddle returned home to Philadelphia. He practiced law and wrote, contributing papers to different publications on various subjects, but chiefly in the fine arts. He became associate editor of a literary magazine called Port-Folio, which was published from 1806 to 1823. When editor Joseph Dennie died in 1812, Biddle took over the magazine and lived on 7th Street, near Spruce Street. That same year, Biddle was elected a member of the American Philosophical Society.

=== Lewis and Clark ===
Biddle also edited the journals of the Lewis and Clark Expedition. He encouraged President Thomas Jefferson to write an introductory memoir of his former aide and private secretary, Captain Meriwether Lewis (1774–1809). Biddle's work would be published as a book in 1814 and would become the standard account of the expedition for more than a century. But because he had been elected to the Pennsylvania state legislature, Biddle was compelled to hand over editorial responsibilities to Paul Allen (1775–1826), who supervised the project until its completion and appeared in print as the book's official editor.

=== Pennsylvania General Assembly ===
Biddle was elected as a Republican member of the Pennsylvania House of Representatives in 1810, and then in the Pennsylvania State Senate for the 1st district from 1813 to 1815. He originated a bill favoring a free system of public schools—available to all Pennsylvanians regardless of their economic class—almost a quarter of a century in advance of the times. Though the bill was initially defeated, it resurfaced repeatedly in different forms until, in 1836, the Pennsylvania "common-school" system was inaugurated as an indirect result of his efforts.

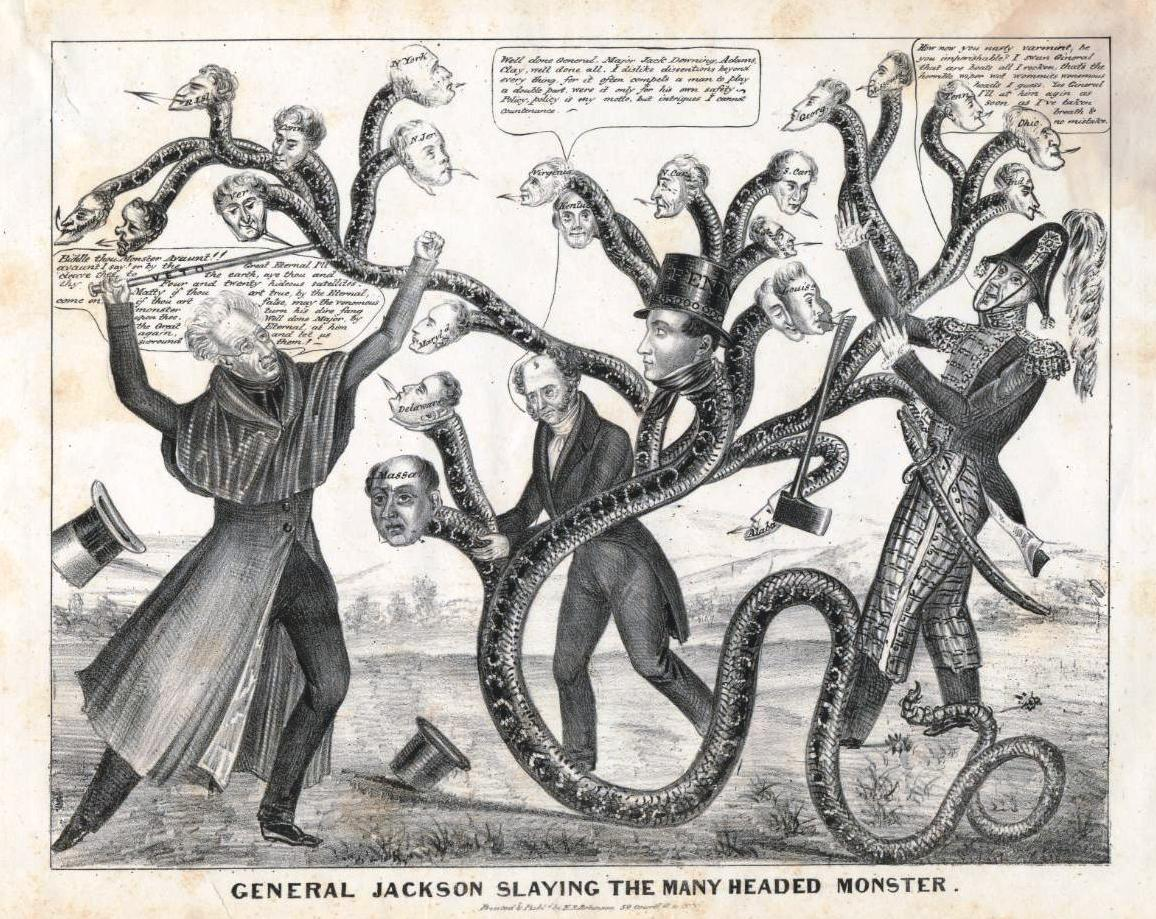
Seventh President Andrew Jackson slays the many-headed monster that symbolizes the revived second Bank of the United States. Nicholas Biddle is in the middle, in the top hat.

== The Bank of the United States ==
=== Early years ===
After Biddle moved to the Pennsylvania State Senate, he lobbied for the rechartering of the First Bank of the United States. It was on this subject that he made his first major speech, which attracted general attention at the time, and was warmly commended by Chief Justice John Marshall and other leaders of public opinion.

The First Bank had been established in 1791 under the administration of President George Washington. Congress opted not to renew its twenty-year charter in 1811, and as a result, the First Bank closed its doors. After economic hardships, monetary pressures, and problems financing the federal government during the War of 1812, Congress and the president granted a new twenty-year charter to the Second Bank of the United States in 1816. The Second Bank was in many ways a revived and reorganized version of the First Bank. President James Monroe subsequently appointed Biddle as a government director. When Bank President Langdon Cheves resigned in 1822, Biddle became the institution's new president. During his association with the Bank, President Monroe, under authority from Congress, directed him to prepare a "Commercial Digest" of the laws and trade regulations of the world and the various nations. For many years after, this Digest was regarded as an authority on the subject.

In late 1818, $4 million of interest payments on the bonds previously sold in 1803 to pay for the Louisiana Purchase were due, in either gold or silver, to European investors. The Treasury Department, therefore, had to acquire additional amounts of specie. As the federal government's chief fiscal agent, the Bank was obligated to make these payments on behalf of the Treasury. The Bank demanded that private and state-chartered commercial banks, many of which had loaned excessively and previously served as fiscal agents during the War of 1812, now pay the Second Bank in specie, which was then sent to Europe to pay the federal government's creditors. This rather sudden contraction of the country's monetary base after three years of speculation helped contribute to the financial Panic of 1819.

Meanwhile, in Tennessee, military hero and future presidential candidate Andrew Jackson was hard-pressed to pay his debts during this period. He developed a lifelong hostility to all banks that were not completely backed by gold or silver deposits. This meant, above all, hostility to the new Second Bank of the United States.

As a banker, Biddle promulgated a nationalistic vision with an emphasis on regulation and flexibility. He was also innovative. Biddle occasionally engaged in the relatively new techniques of central banking–-controlling the nation's money supply, regulating interest rates, lending to state banks, and acting as the Treasury Department's chief fiscal agent. When state banks became excessive in their lending practices, Biddle's Bank acted as a restraint. In a few instances, he even rescued state banks to prevent the risk of "contagion" spreading.

In 1823, Biddle started concentrating the Bank's facilities in the West, Southwest, and South to meet the demands for credit generated by the expansion of land, cotton, and slavery. He did this by directing his branch officers to circulate large quantities of branch drafts and by buying and selling millions of dollars of bills of exchange. As cotton moved downriver in the winter and spring months, merchants drew up bills of exchange representing the value of cotton exports, presenting them to the Bank's southern branches. Using its interregional network of branch offices and the transportation improvements then under way, the Bank would ship these bills to the Northeast where merchants could use them to pay for imported manufactured goods arriving from Great Britain in the summer and fall. The result was that Biddle helped provide an economic infrastructure that facilitated long-distance trade, propagated a relatively stable and uniform currency, and played a major role in integrating and consolidating fiscal operations at the federal level. Indeed, Biddle won praise for the Bank by making steady payments to reduce the country's public debt, by preventing a potentially harmful recession in the winter of 1825–1826, and more generally, by smoothing out variations in prices and trade.

He was also important in the 1833 establishment of Girard College, an early free private school for poor orphaned boys in Philadelphia, under the provisions of the will of his friend and former legal client, Stephen Girard (1750–1831), one of the wealthiest men in America. Girard had been the original promoter of the revival and reorganization of the Second Bank and its largest investor.

=== Bank War ===
The Bank War began when President Jackson started criticizing the Bank early in his first term. Beyond the long list of personal and ideological objections that Jackson maintained toward the Bank, there were rumors that Bank officers at some of the branch offices had interfered in the presidential contest of 1828 by providing financial assistance to the National Republican candidate, John Quincy Adams. Although Biddle traveled to the branch offices to examine the veracity of these claims in person, and denied them unequivocally, Jackson continued to believe that they were true. In January 1832, Biddle submitted an application to Congress for a renewal of the Bank's twenty-year charter, four years before the current charter was due to expire. Henry Clay and other Bank supporters hoped to force Jackson into making an unpopular decision that might cost him during an election year, but there were also pressures for an early application emanating from the Bank's stockholders and board of directors. President Jackson vetoed the bill in a stunning move that carried significant consequences for the relationship between Congress and the executive branch. The reasons for Jackson's veto were legion and included concerns over the Bank's monopoly power and concentrated wealth, constitutional scruples, states' rights, the Bank's foreign stockholders and ability to foreclose on large parcels of land, sectional animosity toward eastern financiers, and political patronage. An additional factor was Jackson's personality. The president was well known for his stubbornness and continued to harbor resentment toward Clay from the earlier "Corrupt Bargain" accusation following the presidential election of 1824.

At Biddle's direction, the Bank poured tens of thousands of dollars into a campaign to defeat Jackson in the presidential election of 1832. This was a continuation of a strategy that one historian has referred to as one of the earliest examples in the country's history of an interregional corporate lobby and public relations campaign. Articles, stockholders' reports, editorials, essays, philosophical treatises, petitions, pamphlets, and copies of congressional speeches were among the diverse forms of media that Biddle transmitted to various sections of the country through loans and Bank expenditures. Reports of unusually generous loans to pro-BUS politicians and even small bribes to sympathetic newspaper editors, the details of which came to light in a congressional report published in April 1832, helped convince hard-line Jacksonians that the corrupt "Monster Bank" must be destroyed. Biddle was told that such vigorous campaign spending would only give credence to Jackson's theory that the Bank interfered in the American political process, but chose to dismiss the warning. Ultimately, Clay's strategy failed, and in November he lost handily to Jackson, who was reelected to a second term.

In early 1833, Jackson, despite opposition from some members of his cabinet, decided to withdraw the Treasury Department's public (or federal) deposits from the Bank. The incumbent secretary of the treasury, Louis McLane, a member of Jackson's Cabinet, professed moderate support for the Bank. He therefore refused to withdraw the federal deposits directed by the president and would not resign, so Jackson then transferred him to the State Department. McLane's successor, William J. Duane, was also opposed to the Bank, but would not carry out Jackson's orders either. After waiting four months, President Jackson summarily dismissed Duane, replacing him with Attorney General Roger B. Taney as a recess appointment when Congress was out of session. In September 1833, Taney helped transfer the public deposits from the Bank to seven state-chartered banks. Faced with the loss of the federal deposits, Biddle decided to raise interest rates. A mild financial panic ensued from late 1833 to mid-1834. Intended to force Jackson into a compromise and demonstrate the utility of a national bank for the nation's economy, the move had the opposite effect of increasing anti-Bank sentiment. Meanwhile, Biddle and other Bank supporters attempted to renew the Bank's charter on numerous occasions. All their attempts failed because they did not have the two-thirds majorities in Congress to overcome a presidential veto.

=== Demise of the bank ===
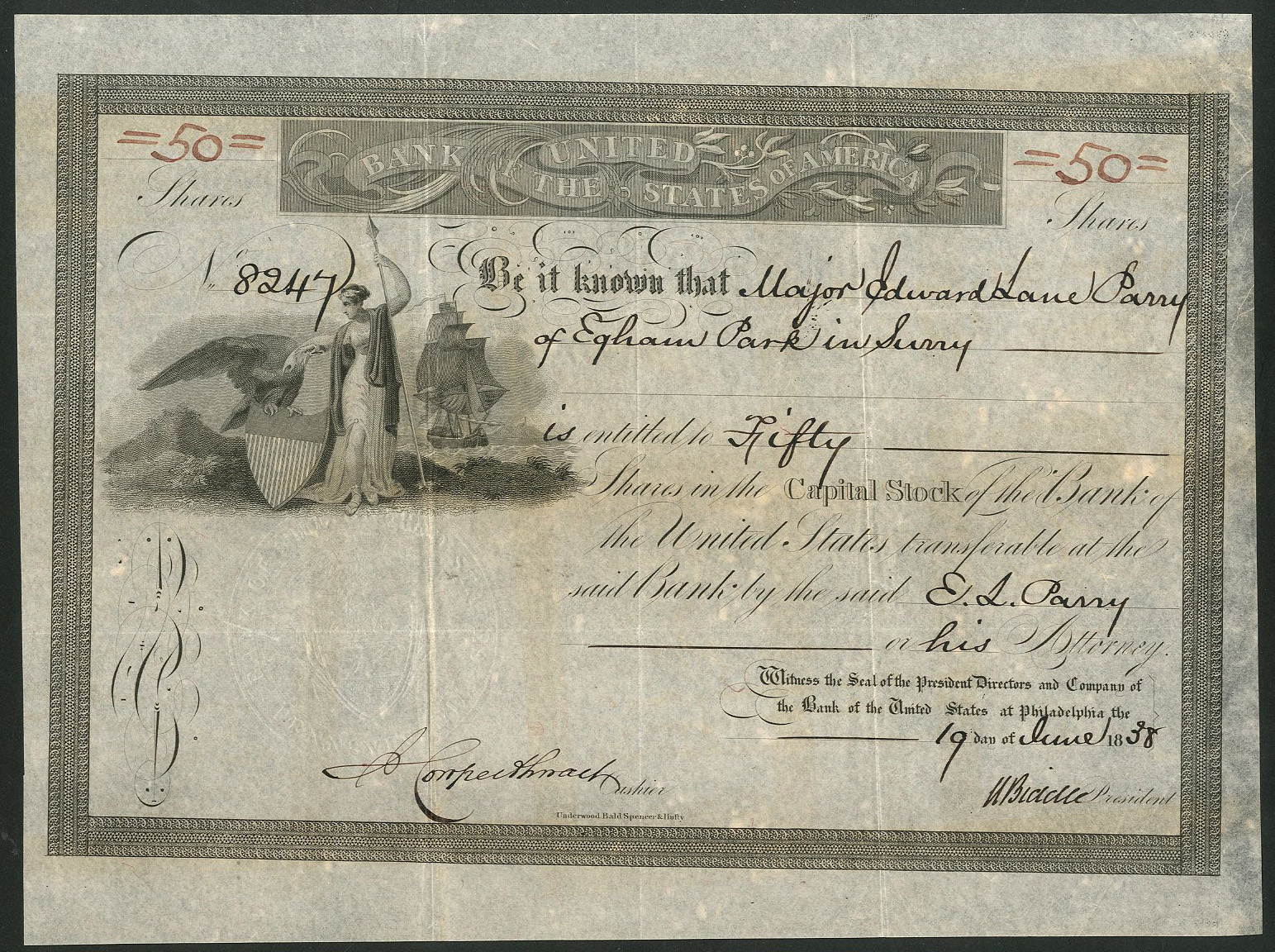
Share of the Second Bank of the United States, issued 18. June 1838, signed by Nicholas Biddle

The Second Bank's twenty-year charter expired in April 1836, but Biddle worked with the Pennsylvania state legislature to prolong the institution as a state-chartered bank, the United States Bank of Pennsylvania (BUSP). The BUSP remained open for several more years. It was in the later years of his career that Biddle began to invest significant financial resources not only in internal improvement projects, but also in the booming expansion of land, cotton, and slavery in the Old Southwest.

In 1837 and 1838, Biddle secretively dispatched agents into the South to buy up several million dollars' worth of cotton with the notes of state-chartered banks, all in an effort to restore the nation's credit and pay off foreign debts owed to British merchant bankers. Critics called this an example of illegal cotton speculation and noted that the Bank's charter forbid the institution from purchasing commodities. Biddle also invested in and bailed out several state-chartered banks in the South whose capital was derived partially from slave mortgages. Some of these banks, including the Union Bank of Mississippi, financed the dispossession of Native Americans. Indeed, post-notes issued by the BUSP helped conclude one of the treaties that removed the Cherokee from their ancestral lands. In addition, Biddle purchased bonds in the Republic of Texas, opposed territorial expansion into Oregon, and denounced abolitionists.

Meanwhile, in the absence of any regulatory oversight provided by a central bank, state-chartered banks in the West and South relaxed their lending standards, took on greater risks, maintained unsafe reserve ratios, and contributed to a credit bubble that eventually burst with the Panic of 1837. In 1839, after seeing his investment in cotton speculation backfire, Biddle resigned from his post as bank president, and in 1841, with the nation still reeling from depression, the Bank finally collapsed. Because the BUSP had issued loans to financial institutions and individual actors who pledged slave mortgages as collateral, the BUSP tragically became one of the largest owners of plantations, slaves, and slave-grown products in Mississippi as debtors rushed to repay creditors during the economic downturn of the early 1840s.

Biddle and a few of his colleagues had borrowed tens of thousands of dollars of cash from the BUSP on their own account without going through the normal lending process and without informing the Bank's board, and as a result, a grand jury indicted Biddle on charges of fraud in December 1841. Biddle was arrested and forced to pay compensation to creditors using the remainder of his personal fortune. The charges were later dismissed. On February 27, 1844, at the age of fifty-eight, Biddle died at the Andalusia estate from complications related to bronchitis and edema. Funds from his wife's family supported the ongoing civil lawsuits that plagued Biddle toward the end of his life.

== Family ==
Nicholas's father, Charles, was noteworthy for his devotion to the cause of American independence and served alongside Benjamin Franklin on the Supreme Executive Council of Pennsylvania. His paternal uncle and namesake, Nicholas Biddle (1750–1778), was a naval hero who died during the American Revolutionary War. Another uncle, Edward Biddle, was a member of the First Continental Congress of 1774.

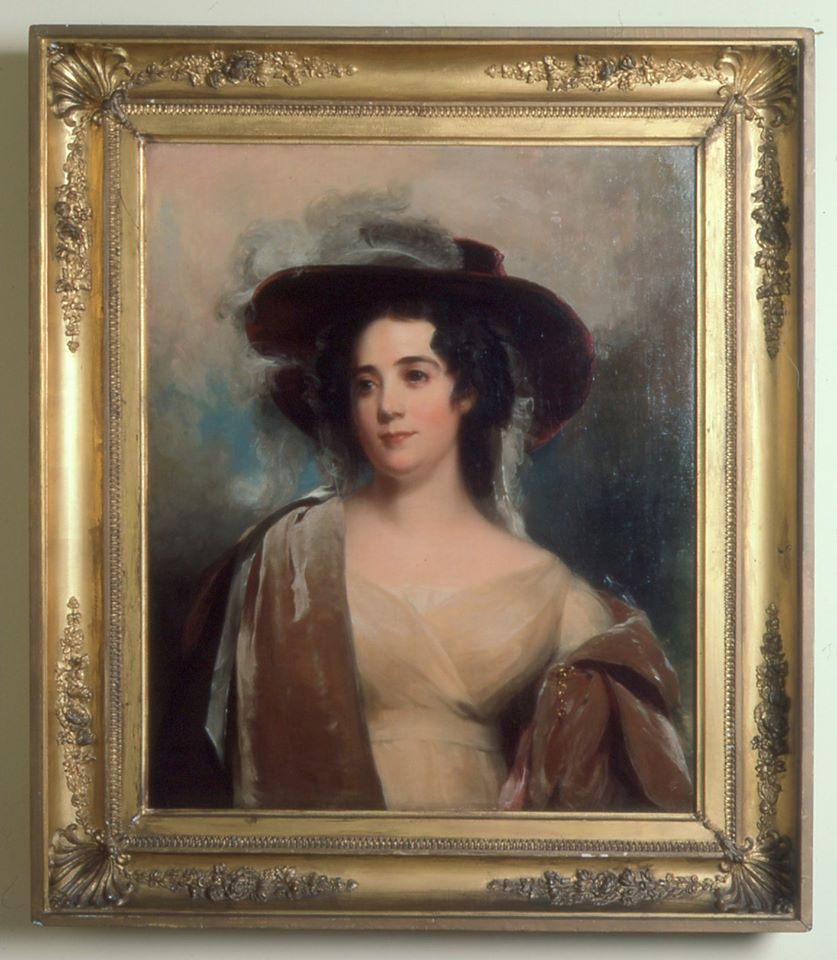
Jane Craig Biddle

In 1811, Biddle married Jane Margaret Craig (1793–1856). The couple had six children, including Charles John Biddle, who served in the U.S. Army and in the U.S. House of Representatives, and Edward C. Biddle (1815–1872), with whom Nicholas worked in the international cotton trade during the late 1830s.

Nicholas had a younger brother, Thomas Biddle, a War of 1812 veteran who became a federal pension agent and director at the Second Bank's branch office in St. Louis, Missouri. On August 26, 1831, Thomas participated in a duel with U.S. Representative Spencer Pettis of Missouri. The duel took place on "Bloody Island", in the middle of the Mississippi River, near St. Louis. Because Thomas was nearsighted, the two exchanged shots from a perilously close distance of five feet. Pettis died within hours while Thomas succumbed to his wounds three days later. The origins of the duel can be traced to Pettis's criticism of Nicholas's management of the Bank, which Thomas defended. After an exchange of letters to the editor of a newspaper, Biddle accosted an ill Pettis in his hotel room. Pettis recovered and then challenged Thomas to a duel. Thomas Biddle should not be confused with his second cousin, Thomas Biddle of Philadelphia, one of the city's leading exchange brokers.

== Nicholas Biddle Estate ==
The Nicholas Biddle Estate in Bensalem Township, Pennsylvania, also known as "Andalusia", is a National Historic Landmark, registered with the National Park Service of the U.S. Department of the Interior.

== Notes ==
Pennsylvania State Senate
| Preceded by John Barclay | Member of the Pennsylvania Senate, 1st district 1813-1815 | Succeeded by William Maghee |
Business positions
| Preceded by Langdon Cheves | President of the Second Bank of the United States; 1823–1836 | Succeeded by expiration of bank charter |
