= List of last words =

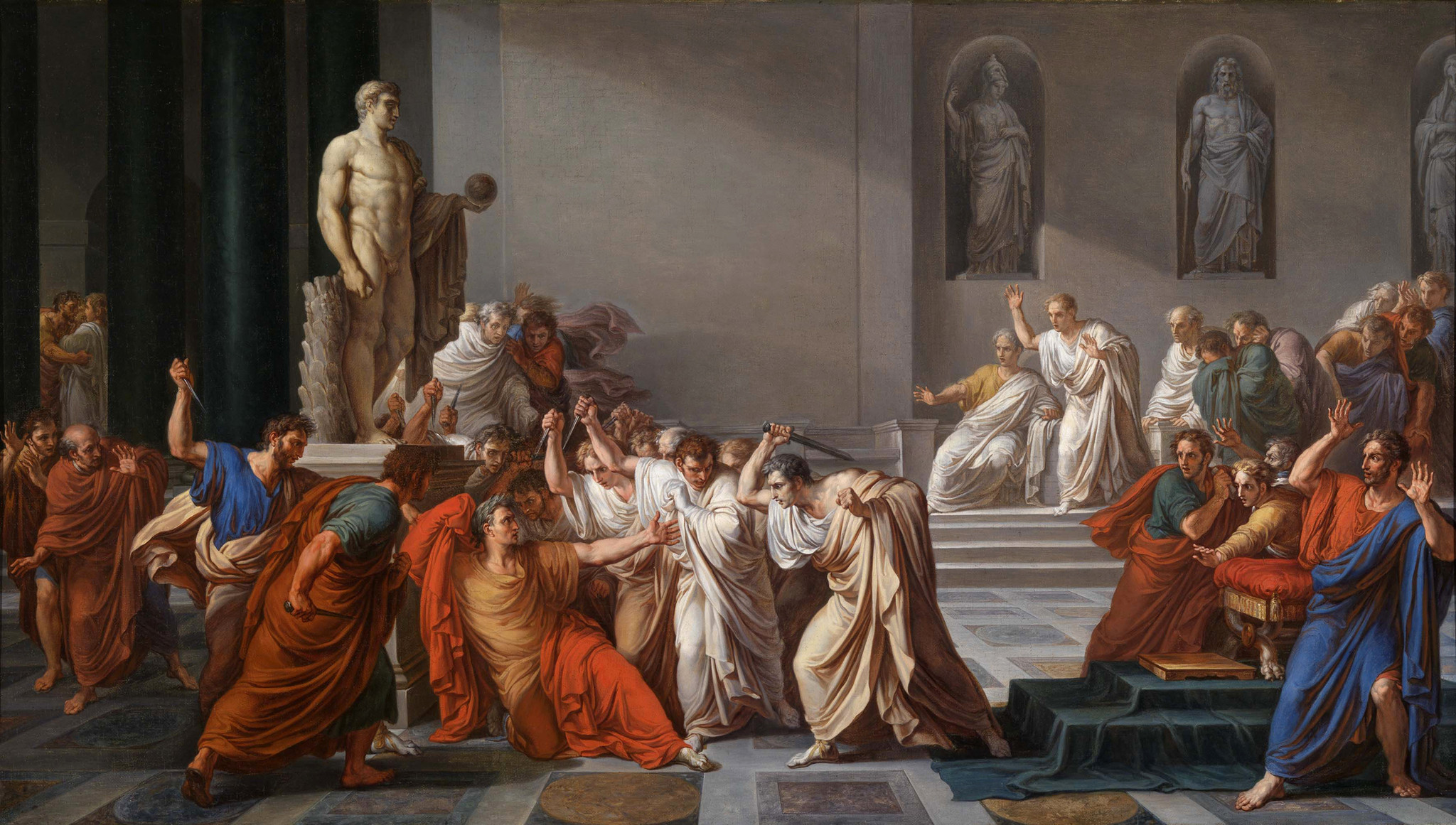
Julius Caesar was assassinated by a group of rivals. In his last words, Caesar allegedly exclaimed over the fact that his friend and relative Brutus took part in his murder.

A person's last words, their final articulated words stated prior to death or as death approaches, are often recorded because of the decedent's fame, but sometimes because of interest in the statement itself. (People dying of illness are frequently inarticulate at the end, and in such cases their actual last utterances may not be recorded or considered very important.) Last words may be recorded accurately, or, for a variety of reasons, may not. Reasons can include simple error or deliberate intent. Even if reported wrongly, putative last words can constitute an important part of the perceived historical records or demonstration of cultural attitudes toward death at the time.

Charles Darwin, for example, was reported to have disavowed his theory of evolution in favor of traditional religious faith at his death. This widely disseminated report served the interests of those who opposed Darwin's theory on religious grounds. However, the putative witness had not been at Darwin's deathbed or seen him at any time near the end of his life.

Cultural traditions around the world ascribe special significance to words uttered at or near death, but the form and content of reported last words may depend on cultural context. There is a tradition in Hindu and Buddhist cultures of an expectation of a meaningful farewell statement; Zen monks by long custom are expected to compose a poem on the spot and recite it with their last breath. In Western culture particular attention has been paid to last words which demonstrate deathbed salvation – the repentance of sins and affirmation of faith.

List of last words
18th century	19th century	20th century	21st century

== Chronological list of last words ==
In rising chronological order, with death date specified. If relevant, also the context of the words or the circumstances of death are specified. If there is controversy or uncertainty concerning a person's last words, this is described in footnotes. For additional suicide notes, see Suicide note.

=== Pre-5th century ===
"Wash me well, hold me to your breast, protect me from the earth (lying against) your breast."
— Ḫattušili I, Hittite king (17th century BC), probably addressing his wife or favorite concubine and expressing his fear of death while being gravely ill. (Note: This sentence marks the end of the official testament of Ḫattušili I, and contains his last recorded words. Hittitologist Trevor R. Bryce argued that the sentence was unintentionally included in the document and actually only meant for the king's companion, not for posterity: He points out that the sentence clashed in tone and content with the rest of the document, and was only written down because a scribe had been hastily ordered to document all words of Ḫattušili I when it was feared that the king might pass away at any moment due to his illness.)

"Draw thy sword, and slay me, that men say not of me, a woman slew him."
("שְׁלֹף חַרְבְּךָ וּמוֹתְתֵנִי--פֶּן-יֹאמְרוּ לִי, אִשָּׁה הֲרָגָתְהוּ")
— Abimelech, king of Shechem (12th century BC). Mortally wounded in battle by a stone thrown by a woman, he asked his armor-bearer to kill him.

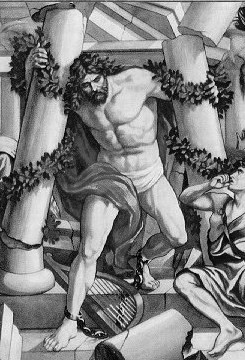
Samson destroying the Philistine temple.

"Let me die with the Philistines."
("תָּמוֹת נַפְשִׁי עִם-פְּלִשְׁתִּים")
— Samson, judge of the Israelites (c. 1078 BC), prior to bringing down pillars of the Philistine temple and killing 3000 people along with himself

"Draw thy sword, and thrust me through therewith; lest these uncircumcised come and thrust me through, and abuse me."
("שְׁלֹף חַרְבְּךָ וְדָקְרֵנִי בָהּ, פֶּן-יָבוֹאוּ הָעֲרֵלִים הָאֵלֶּה וּדְקָרֻנִי וְהִתְעַלְּלוּ-בִי")
— Saul, king of Israel (c. 1012 BC), to his servant during the Battle of Mount Gilboa. The servant did not heed the request and Saul ended up taking his own life.

"I am going the way of all the earth. Be strong and be a man! Keep the mandate of the Lord, your God, walking in his ways and keeping his statutes, commands, ordinances, and decrees as they are written in the law of Moses, that you may succeed in whatever you do, and wherever you turn, and that the Lord may fulfill the word he spoke concerning me꞉ If your sons so conduct themselves that they walk before me in faithfulness with their whole heart and soul, there shall never be wanting someone of your line on the throne of Israel.

You yourself know what Joab, son of Zeruiah, did to me—what he did to the two commanders of Israel’s armies, Abner, son of Ner, and Amasa, son of Jether꞉ he killed them and brought the blood of war into a time of peace, and put the blood of war on the belt about his waist and the sandal on his foot. Act with all the wisdom you possess; do not let his gray head go down to Sheol in peace. But be true to the sons of Barzillai the Gileadite, and have them among those who eat at your table. For they were loyal to me when I was fleeing from your brother Absalom. You also have with you Shimei, son of Gera, the Benjaminite of Bahurim, who cursed me bitterly the day I was going to Mahanaim. When he came down to meet me at the Jordan, I swore to him by the Lord꞉ ‘I will not kill you by the sword.’ But you must not let him go unpunished. You are wise; you will know what to do to send his gray head down to Sheol in blood."
— David, king of Israel (c. 970 BC), speaking to his son Solomon

"My reputation carried me safe through Greece, but the envy it excited at home has been my ruin." (Note: Also reported as, "In Greece, where I traveled to learn the literature and manners of the country, I was allowed to remain in safety; but in my own soil, envy has been the cause of my death.")
— Anacharsis, Scythian philosopher (6th century BC), mortally wounded with an arrow by his brother, King Caduidas

"You know that during the long time I have been in the world, I have said and done many things; upon mature reflection, I find nothing of which I have cause to repent, excepting a case which I will now submit to your decision, that I may know whether I have acted properly or not.

On a certain occasion, I chanced to be one of three who sat in judgment on one of my own good friends, who, according to the laws, should have been punished with death. I was greatly embarrassed. One of two things was inevitable—either to violate the law or condemn my friend. After careful consideration, I devised this expedient. I delivered with such address all the most plausible arguments in behalf of the accused, that my two colleagues found no difficulty in acquitting him, and yet I, myself, condemned him to death without assigning any reason for my conduct. Thus I discharged two duties, those of friend and judge; yet I feel in my conscience something which makes me doubt whether my conduct was not criminal."
— Chilon of Sparta, philosopher (6th century BC), speaking to his friends before his death

"It is better to perish here than to kill all these poor beans." (Note: There are multiple accounts of Pythagoras' death.)
— Pythagoras, Ionian Greek philosopher and founder of Pythagoreanism (495 BC), refusing to escape with his students from the Crotonians through a fava bean field

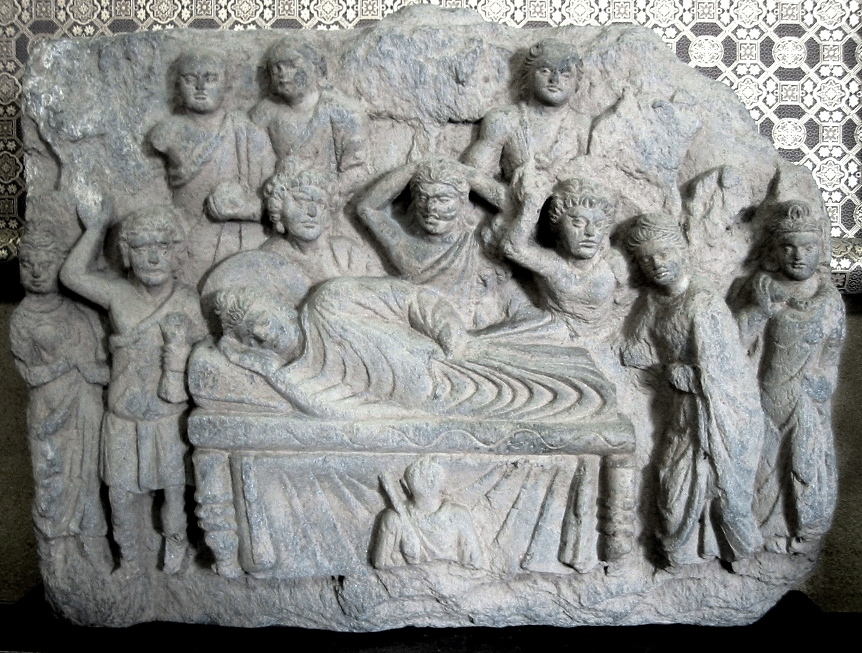
Parinirvana of the Buddha.

"All compounded things are subject to vanish. Strive with earnestness." (Note: Also reported as, "Beloved Bickus, the principle of existence, and mutability carries with it the principle of destruction. Never forget this; let your minds be filled with this truth; to make it known to you I have assembled you.")
("वयधम्मा सङखार्आ अप्पमादेन सम्पादेथा")
— Siddhārtha Gautama Buddha, Shakya sage who founded Buddhism (c. 483 BC)

"Heaven has turned against me. No wise ruler arises, and no one in the Empire wishes to make me his teacher. The hour of my death has come." (Note: Also reported as, "No intelligent ruler arises to choose me as his master" and as "I have taught men how to live.")
— Confucius, Chinese philosopher who founded Confucianism (479 BC)

"Can you turn rainy weather into dry?"
— Heraclitus, Greek philosopher (c. 475 BC), asking his physicians for relief from dropsy

"For, no Athenian, through my means, ever wore mourning."
— Pericles, Greek statesman (429 BC), discussing with his friends what his greatest accomplishment had been

"Give the boys a holiday." (Note: Also reported as, "O Pericles! those who need a lamp take care to feed it with oil" (when Pericles visited him while he was starving himself to death after his exile).)
— Anaxagoras, Greek philosopher (c. 428 BC), in response to citizens of Lampsacus asking how they could honor his memory

"This to the fair Critias."
— Theramenes, Athenian statesman (404 BC), after swallowing poison hemlock which he had been condemned to drink by Critias

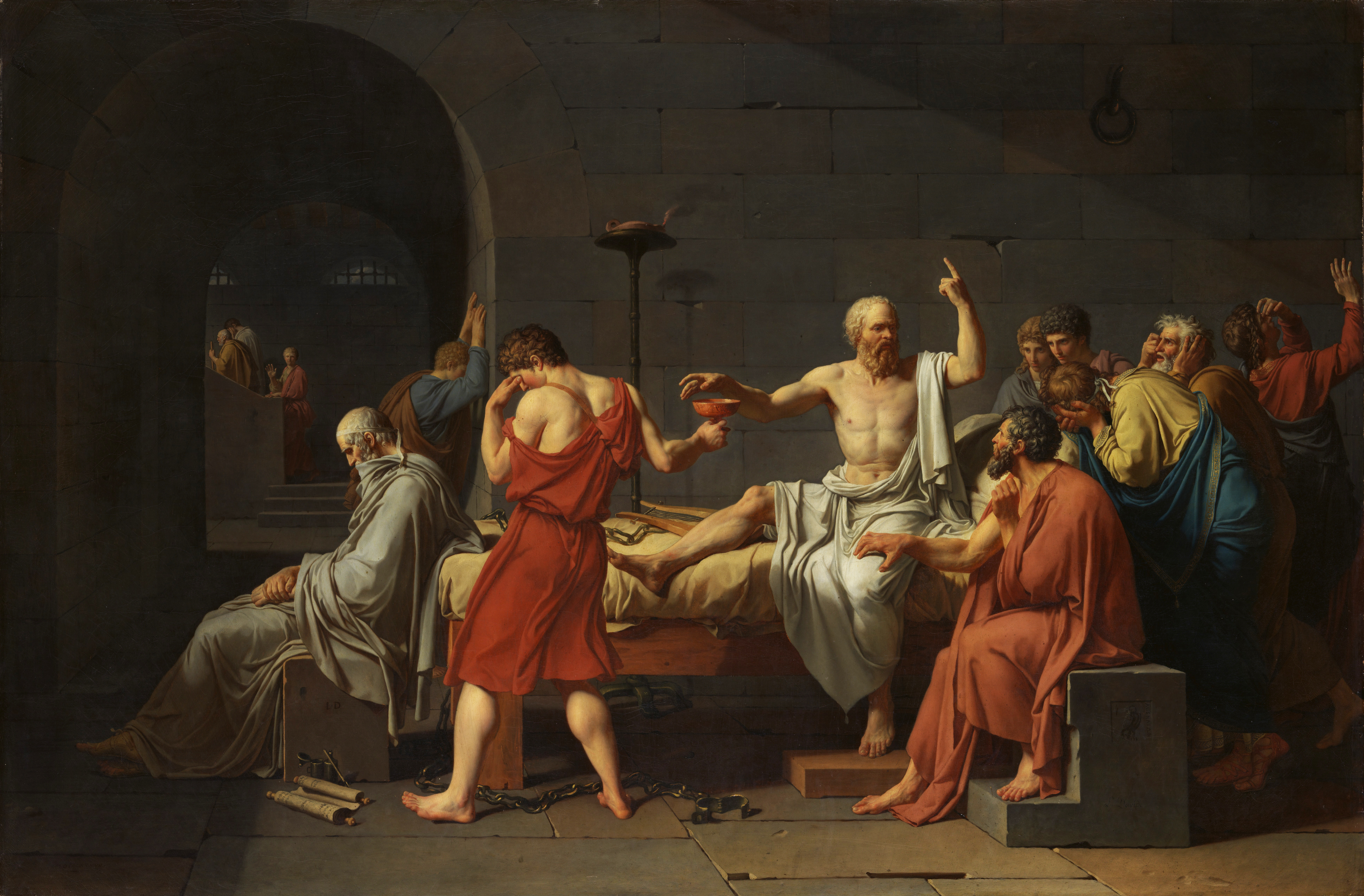
Socrates was sentenced to death after being accused of questioning traditional Athenian values.

"Crito, we owe a cock to Asclepius. Please, don't forget to pay the debt."
("Κρίτων, ἔφη, τῷ Ἀσκληπιῷ ὀφείλομεν ἀλεκτρυόνα· ἀλλὰ ἀπόδοτε καὶ μὴ ἀμελήσητε")
— Socrates, Greek philosopher (399 BC), just before his death by ingestion of poison hemlock which he was forced to drink as a death sentence

"Men, it is good for me to die on this spot, where honor bids me; but for you, yonder your path lies. Hurry and save yourselves before the enemy can close with us."
— Anaxibius, Spartan admiral (388 BC), before being killed in Athenian ambush

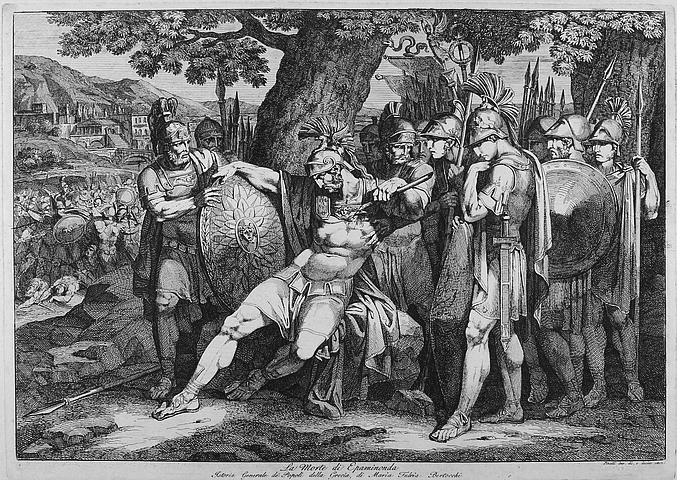
The death of Epaminondas.

"Then I die happy."
— Epaminondas, Greek general and statesman of Thebes (362 BC). He pulled out the weapon with which he had been impaled in battle once he heard the enemy was fleeing.

"But Alexander, whose kindness to my mother, my wife, and my children I hope the gods will recompense, will doubtless thank you for your humanity to me. Tell him, therefore, in token of my acknowledgement, I give him this right hand."
— Darius III, Achaemenid King of Kings of Persia (330 BC), to a man who gave him water as he was dying

"How can the teeth of wild beasts hurt me, without consciousness?"
("Quid mihi nocebunt ferārum dentes nihil sentienti.")
— Diogenes, Greek Cynic philosopher (323 BC), asking for his body to be thrown outside the city wall for animals to eat

"To the strongest." (Note: Alternatively, Alexander's last words may have been "tôi Kraterôi"—"to Craterus", the general leading his Macedonian troops home and newly entrusted with the regency of Macedonia, but with these last words being willfully or erroneously misheard by his successors.)
("Τῷ κρατίστῳ")
— Alexander the Great, conqueror and king of Macedonia (c. 11 June 323 BC), when asked to whom his vast empire should belong after his death

"Now, as soon as you please you may commence the part of Creon in the tragedy, and cast out this body of mine unburied. But, O gracious Neptune, I, for my part, while I am yet alive, arise up and depart out of this sacred place; though Antipater and the Macedonians have not left so much as thy temple unpolluted."
— Demosthenes, Greek statesman and orator (12 October 322 BC), to Archias of Thurii; Demosthenes had taken poison to avoid arrest by Archias

""You are going, dear hunchback, you are off to the house of Hades, – bent crooked by old age."."
— Crates of Thebes, Cynic philosopher (c. 285 BC), chanting when about to die

"Now, farewell, and remember all my words!"
— Epicurus, Greek philosopher (270 BC); the majority of his writings are now lost

"I come, I come, why dost thou call for me?" (Note: Also reported as, "I come of my own accord; why then call me?" and "Earth, dost thou demand me? I am ready.")
— Zeno of Citium, Greek philosopher and founder of Stoicism (c. 262 BC), quoting Aeschylus' play Niobe and striking the ground with his hand after sustaining a minor injury, which he considered a sign that he was about to die. He then killed himself.

"Weep not, friend, for me, who dies innocent, by the lawless act of wicked men. My condition is much better than theirs."
— Agis IV, king of Sparta (241 BC), prior to execution by strangulation

"O children, whither are you going?"
— Cratesiclea, queen of Sparta (219 BC), after seeing the children of her family executed prior to her own execution

"These, O Cephalon, are the wages of a king's love."
— Aratus of Sicyon, Hellenistic Greek politician and military commander (213 BC), after expectorating blood while allegedly being slowly poisoned on the orders of Philip V of Macedon, his former friend

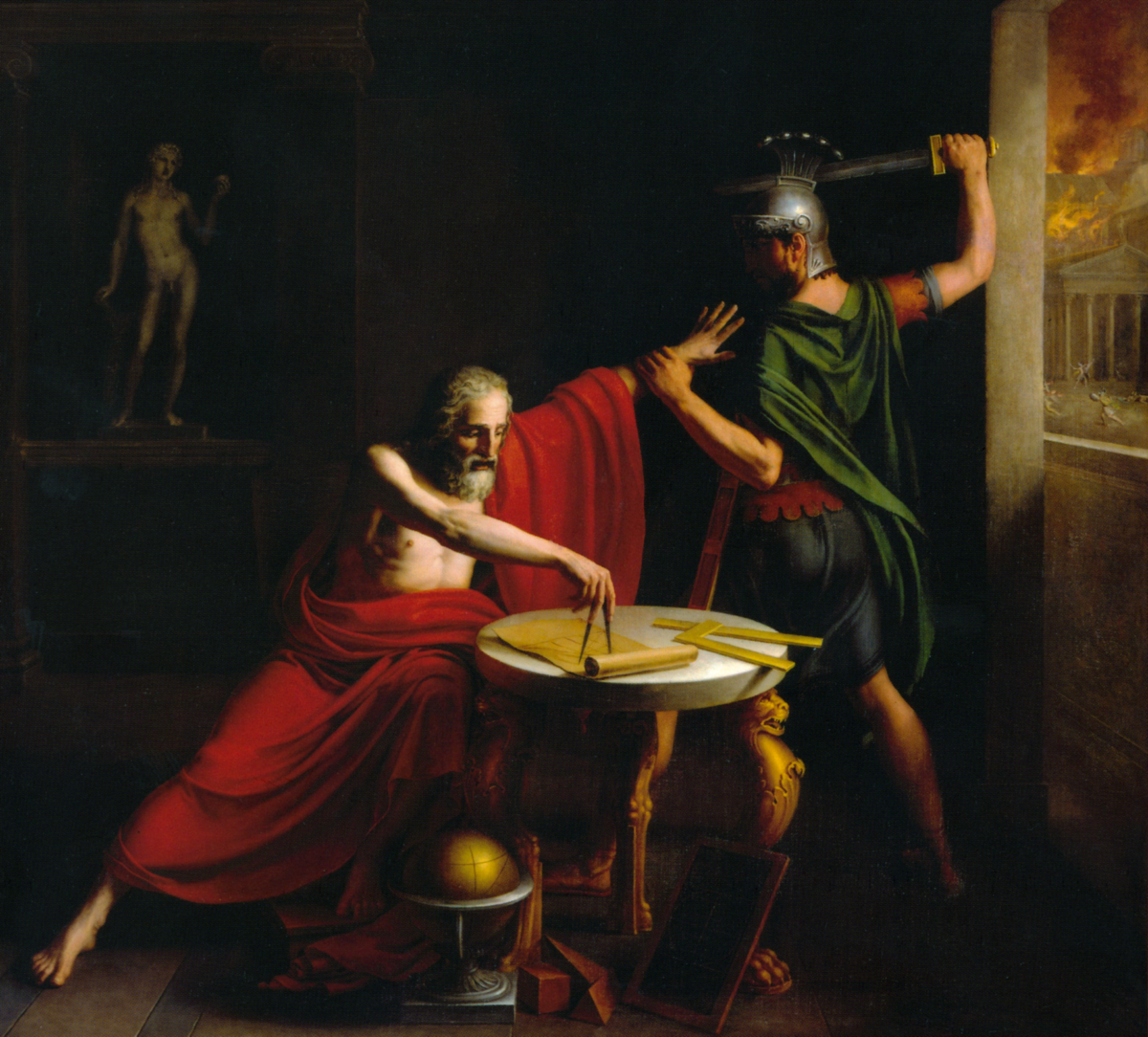
Archimedes was summarily executed by a soldier after refusing to turn away from his math problem.

"Do not disturb my circles!"
("Μή μου τοὺς κύκλους τάραττε!")
— Archimedes, Greek mathematician (c. 212 BC), to a Roman soldier who interrupted his geometric experiments during the capture of Syracuse, whereupon the soldier killed him

"Go and give the ass a drink of wine to wash down the figs."
— Chrysippus, Greek philosopher (c. 206 BC), before dying of laughter

"It is well that we have not been every way unfortunate."
— Philopoemen, Greek general and statesman (183 BC), sent a cup of poison to kill himself after being captured in battle. He asked the messenger with the poison about his cavalry and was told that most of them had escaped.

"Let us ease the Roman people of their continual care, who think it long to await the death of an old man."
("Liberemus diuturna cura populum Romanum, quando mortem senis exspectare longum censent.")
— Hannibal, Carthaginian general (c. 182 BC), in a suicide note

"Let no one weep for me, or celebrate my funeral with mourning; for I still live, as I pass to and fro through the mouths of men."
— Ennius, writer and poet of the Roman Republic (c. 169 BC); lines dictated to be engraved on his memorial. Only fragments of his works now survive.

"It is a cold bath you give me."
— Jugurtha, king of Numidia (104 BC), being lowered by the Romans into a damp dungeon to starve to death

"When will the republic find a citizen like me?"
— Marcus Livius Drusus, Roman politician and reformer (91 BC), after being stabbed by unknown assassin

"Fear not true Pharisees, but greatly fear painted Pharisees."
— Alexander Jannaeus, king of Judea (c. 76 BC), to his wife

"O wretched head-band!—not able to help me even in this small thing!"
— Monime, wife of Mithridates VI (72/71 BC), after failing to hang herself by her crown's strings in fulfillment of her death sentence

"I am free and the subject of a free state."
— Dumnorix, Gallic chieftain, (c. 54 BC), before being killed by Roman cavalry.

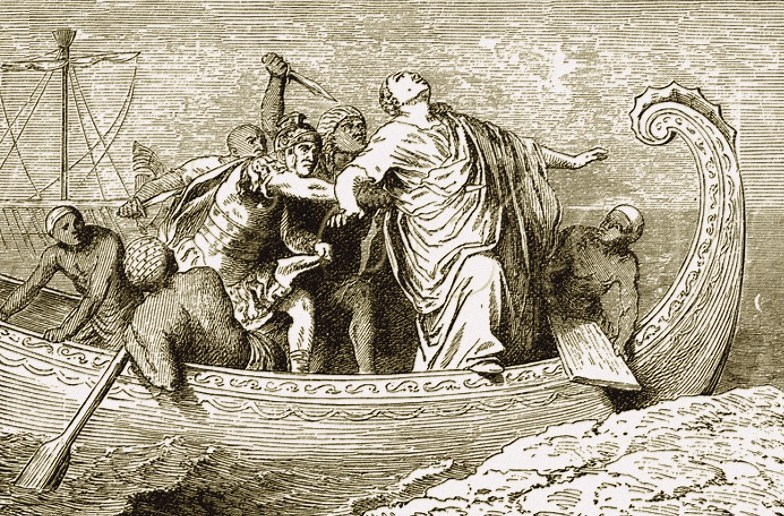
The assassination of Pompey.

"Surely I am not mistaken, and you are an old comrade of mine!"
— Pompey, Roman general and statesman (28 September 48 BC), to Lucius Septimius, one of his assassins

"The imperator is doing well."
("Imperator se bene habet")
— Metellus Scipio, Roman senator and military commander (46 BC), before committing suicide to evade capture following his defeat in the Battle of Hippo Regius.

"You too, my child?" (Note: It is a common misconception that Caesar's last words were "Et tu, Brute?", meaning "And you, Brutus?". However, this is a misattribution originating from the play Julius Caesar by William Shakespeare.)
("Καὶ σὺ, τέκνον")
— Julius Caesar, Roman dictator (15 March 44 BC), discovering that his stepson Brutus was among his murderers.

"O wretched Valour, thou wert but a name, And yet I worshipped thee as real indeed; But now, it seems, thou wert but Fortune's slave."
— Decimus Junius Brutus Albinus, Roman general and politician, conspirator in Julius Caesar's assassination (September 43 BC), quoting from Euripides prior to execution

"I go no further: approach, veteran soldier, and, if you can at least do so much properly, sever this neck. [...] What would you have done had you come to me as your first victim?" (Note: Also reported as, "Strike!" and as "Here, veteran–if you think it right, strike.")
("Accede, veterane, et, si hoc saltim potes recte facere, incide cervicem [...] 'quid, si ad me inquit primum venissetis?")
— Cicero, Roman statesman (7 December 43 BC), facing an assassin sent by an enemy

"Through too much fondness of life, I have lived to endure the sight of my friend taken by the enemy before my face."
— Gaius Cassius Longinus, Roman senator and general, one of Julius Caesar's assassins (3 October 42 BC), erroneously believing his comrade Titinius had been captured by Mark Antony's forces at the Battle of Philippi. Cassius then killed himself.

"By all means must we fly; not with our feet, however, but with our hands."
— Marcus Junius Brutus, Roman senator and assassin of Julius Caesar (23 October 42 BC), after defeat at the Battle of Philippi. He then bade his friends farewell before killing himself.

"You must not pity me in this last turn of fate. You should rather be happy in the remembrance of our love, and in the recollection that of all men I was once the most famous and the most powerful, and now, at the end, have fallen not dishonorably, a Roman by a Roman vanquished." (Note: Also reported as, "It is well done, Eros, you show your master how to do what you had not the heart to do yourself" (to his servant, who had stabbed himself).)
— Mark Antony, Roman politician and general (1 August 30 BC); to Cleopatra before his suicide

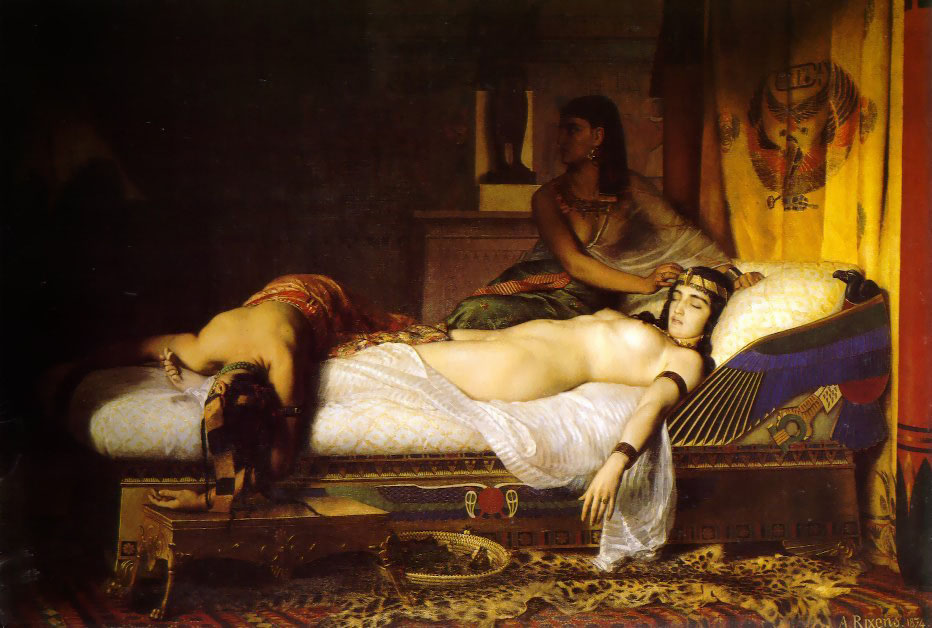
Cleopatra is believed to have committed suicide by letting a venomous snake bite her.

"Here thou art, then!"
("Τόσο εδώ!")
— Cleopatra, pharaoh of Egypt (12 August 30 BC), right before she reportedly committed suicide by letting an asp bite her

"Extremely well, and as became the descendant of so many kings."
— Charmion, servant to Cleopatra (12 August 30 BC), when one of Emperor Augustus' men asked her, "Was this well done of your lady, Charmion?" She then fell dead.

"Death twitches my ear. 'Live,' he says. 'I am coming.'"
— Virgil, Roman poet (21 September 19 BC)

"Have I played the part well? Then applaud, as I exit." (Note: Also reported as, "Livia, conjugii nostri memor, vive, et vale" ("Livia, live on mindful of our union, and farewell") (to his wife) and as "Forty young men are carrying me off.") (Note: It is also said that Augustus' last words were "Behold, I found Rome of clay, and leave her to you of marble." This is not entirely incorrect, as these words were his last spoken in public.)
("Acta est fabula, plaudite.")
— Augustus, First Roman Emperor (19 August 14 AD)

"It is finished. \ Father, into thy hands I commend my spirit." (Note: Three of the four canoncial gospels agree on the final sequence before Jesus's death: he consumed vinegar, made an utterance and died. Only the Gospel of John specifies the words Jesus said during his final utterance; both the Gospel of Matthew and Gospel of Mark mention him making some sort of vocalization. In contrast, the Gospel of Luke's narrative inserts a longer conversation between his fellow condemned that instead ends with the loud utterance being a quote Psalm 31:5: "Father, into thy hands I commit my spirit," a quote not found in any of the other three gospels. For more information, see sayings of Jesus on the cross. Further note that Jesus also has last words attributed to him after his resurrection and before his ascension.))
("τετέλεσται. / πάτερ, εἰς χεῖράς σου παρατίθεμαι τὸ πνεῦμά μου.")
— Jesus, founder of Christianity (c. 30 AD), right before his death by crucifixion

"Lord, lay not this sin to their charge."
— Saint Stephen, early Christian deacon and protomartyr (c. 34 AD), while being stoned to death

"I am still alive!"
— Caligula, Roman emperor (24 January 41 AD), after being fatally stabbed

"It is not painful, Pætus."
("Non dolet, Paete!")
— Arria, Roman woman (42 AD), to her husband, Aulus Caecina Paetus. He had been condemned to death but given permission to kill himself; when he hesitated to do so, his wife stabbed herself first and handed the dagger to him. (Note: Marvin incorrectly gives Arria's date of death as "about the year B. C., 42.")

"Strike here! Level your rage against the womb which gave birth to such a monster."
— Agrippina the Younger, mother of Nero (23 March 59 AD), to her murderer

"Asunder flies the man— / No single wound the gaping rupture seems, / Where trickling crimson flows the tender streams; / But from an opening horrible and wide / A thousand vessels pour the bursting tide: / At once the winding channel's course was broke, / Where wandering life her mazy journey took."
— Lucan, Roman poet (30 April 65 AD), forced to commit suicide after joining in a conspiracy against Nero. He died quoting lines from his own epic poem Pharsalia.

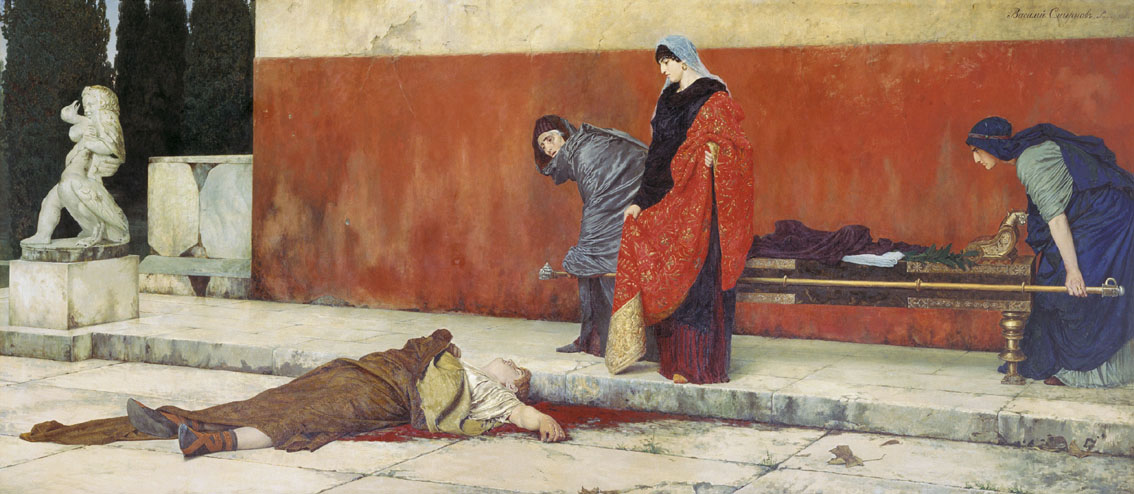
The Death of Nero, painting by Vasily Sergeyevich Smirnov.

"Too late; is this your fidelity?"
("Sero... Haec est fides")
— Nero, Roman emperor (9 June 68 AD), to a soldier trying to save him after his suicide

"Strike, if it be for the Romans' good."
("Ferirent si ita e republica videretur.")
— Galba, Roman emperor (15 January 69 AD), prior to beheading by supporters of Otho

"Go and show yourself to the soldiers, lest they cut you to pieces for being accessory to my death."
— Otho, Roman emperor (16 April 69 AD), to a freedman, prior to committing suicide

"And yet I was once our emperor."
— Vitellius, Roman emperor (22 December 69 AD), prior to his killing on the Gemonian stairs

"Woe, I think I'm turning into a god... An emperor should die on his feet."
("Vae, puto, deus fio... imperatorem stantem oportet mori.")
— Vespasian, Roman emperor (24 June 79 AD), ironically alluding to the Roman practice of posthumously deifying former emperors, before he collapsed and died when attempting to stand up.

"Fortune favors the bold. Make for where Pomponianus is."
— Pliny the Elder, Roman military commander and author (October 79 AD), after being advised to turn back from Herculaneum during the eruption of Mount Vesuvius.

"I have made but one mistake."
— Titus, Roman emperor (13 September 81 AD)

"Hear, O Israel! The Lord is our God! The Lord is One!"
("שְׁמַע יִשְׂרָאֵל יְהוָה אֱלֹהֵינוּ יְהוָה אֶחָד")
— Rabbi Akiva, Jewish scholar and sage (28 September 135 AD), reciting the Shema Yisrael while being executed by the Romans

"O my poor soul, whither art thou going?"
— Hadrian, Roman emperor (10 July 138 AD)

"O Lord God Almighty, Father of Thy well-beloved Son, Jesus Christ, by whom we have received knowledge of Thee; God of angels, powers, and every creature that lives before Thee; I thank Thee that Thou hast graciously thought me worthy of this day and hour, that I may receive a portion in the number of Thy martyrs, and drink of Christ's cup, for the resurrection of both soul and body unto life eternal, in the incorruptibleness of the Holy Spirit. Among them may I be admitted this day, as an acceptable sacrifice, as Thou, O true and faithful God, hast prepared, foreshown, and accomplished. Wherefore, I praise Thee for all Thy mercies. I bless Thee. I glorify Thee, with Jesus Christ, Thy beloved Son, the Eternal, to Whom, with Thee and the Holy Spirit, be glory now and forever."
— Polycarp, Christian bishop of Smyrna (155 AD), prior to martyrdom by burning and spearing

"Equanimity."
("Æquanimitas.")
— Antoninus Pius, Roman emperor (7 March 161 AD), giving the password for the night-watch

"The games are done, The crowns all won; No more delay, But haste away."
— Demonax, Greek Cynic philosopher (c. 170 AD)

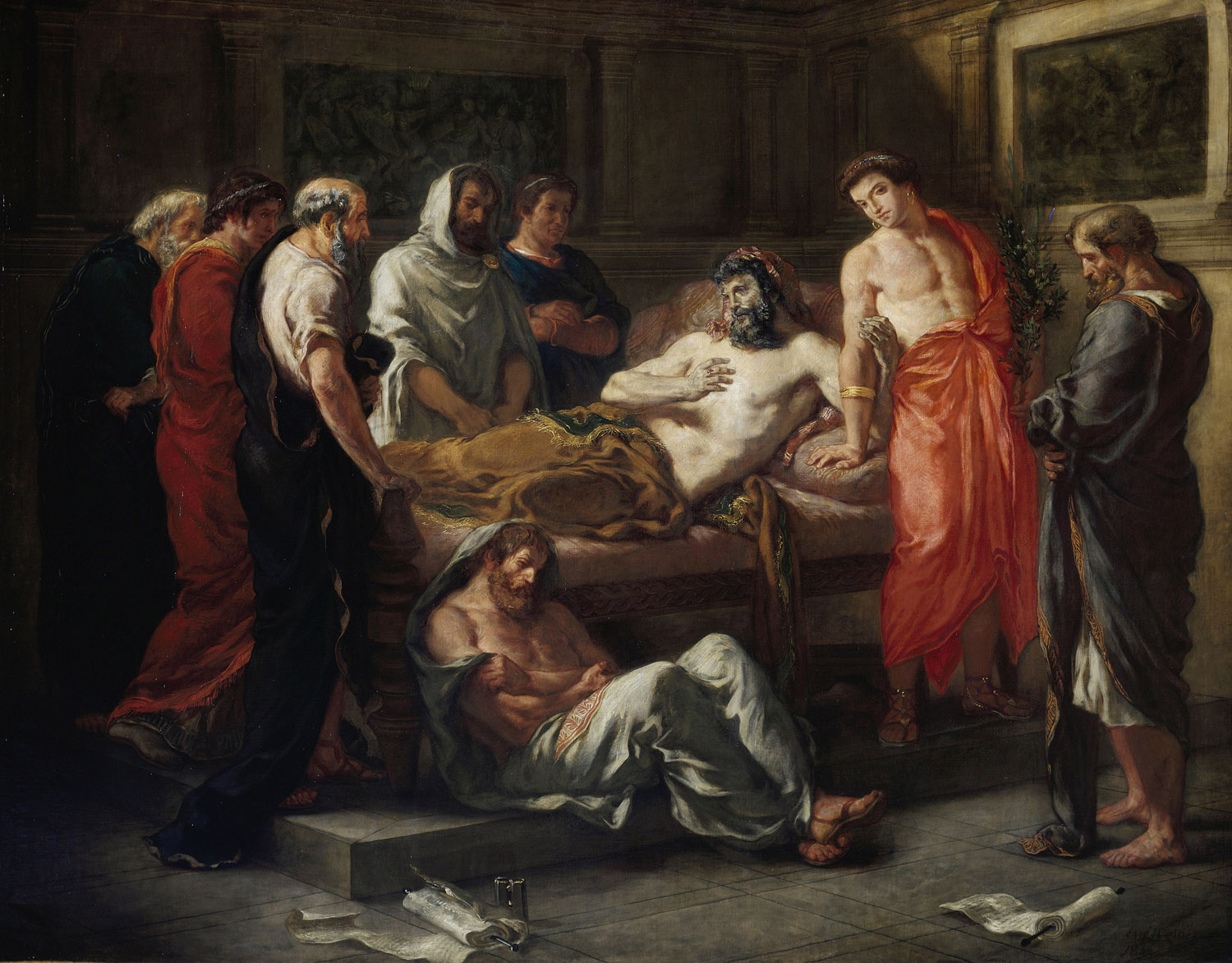
Last Words of the Emperor Marcus Aurelius by Eugène Delacroix.

"Go to the rising sun, for I am setting. Think more of death than of me."
— Marcus Aurelius, Roman emperor and philosopher (17 March 180 AD)

"But what evil have I done? Whom have I killed?""
— Didius Julianus, Roman emperor (2 June 193 AD), to his assassin.

"Hurry, if anything remains for me to do."
("Adeste, si quid mihi restat agendum.")
— Septimius Severus, Roman emperor (4 February 211 AD)

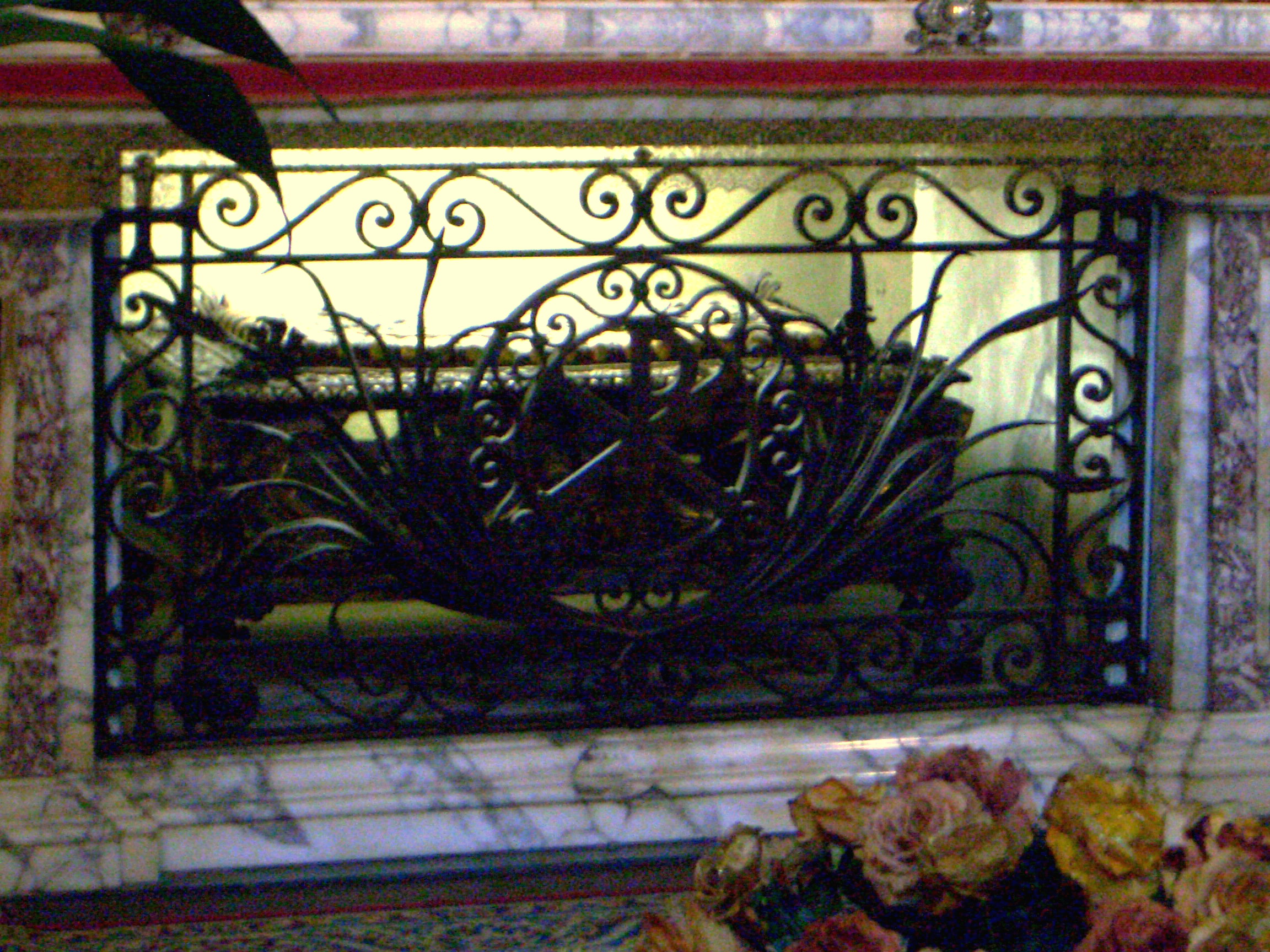
Shrine containing gridiron, traditionally believed to be the one used in the martyrdom of Saint Lawrence.

"I am roasted,—now turn me, and eat me." (Note: Also reported/translated as, "This side enough is toasted, so turn me, tyrant, eat, And see whether raw or roasted I make the better meat" and as "This side is roasted enough. Turn up, oh tyrant great, assay whether roasted or raw thou thinkest the better meat." Lawrence is also reported to have said afterwards, "I thank thee, O my God and Saviour, that I have been found worthy to enter into thy beatitude.")
("Assatus est; jam versa et manduca.")
— Saint Lawrence, Christian deacon (10 August 258 AD), while being burned alive on a gridiron

"God be thanked."
— Cyprian, Christian bishop of Carthage and martyr (14 September 258 AD), sentenced to death by beheading

"I am making my last effort to return that which is divine in me to that which is divine in the Universe." (Note: Also reported/translated as, "I am trying to lift up the divine within me to the divine in the All", "I am trying to reconcile the divine in myself [or, in us] to the divine in the All", "Try to reconcile the god in yourselves to the divine in the All", or "Try to reconcile the divine in yourselves to the divine in the All.")
— Plotinus, Hellenistic philosopher (270 AD)

"And let my word be kept secret by you, so that no one knows the place but you alone. For in the resurrection of the dead I shall receive my body incorruptible once again from the Savior. Distribute my clothing. To Bishop Athanasius give the one sheepskin and the cloak on which I lie, which he gave to me new, but I have by now worn out. And to Bishop Serapion give the other sheepskin, and you keep the hair garment. And now God preserve you, children, for Antony is leaving and is with you no longer."
— Anthony the Great, Christian monk from Egypt (17 January 356 AD)

"How am I advanced, despising you that are upon the earth!"
— Marcus of Arethusa, Christian bishop and martyr (362 AD), hung up in a honey-smeared basket for bees to sting him to death

”The Water is Silent”

Unnamed Final Pythia, Greek Priestess at the oracle at Delphi (362 AD),

"And yet Thou hast conquered, O Galilean!" (Note: Also reported as, "Sun, thou hast betrayed me!")
("Vicisti, Galilaee.")
— Julian, Roman emperor (26 June 363 AD), mortally wounded in battle. He had rejected Christianity in favor of paganism; according to some accounts, he was assassinated by a Christian.

"In peace I will sleep with Him and take my rest."
— Saint Monica, mother of Augustine of Hippo (387 AD)

"My dear one, with whom I lived in love so long, make room for me, for this is my grave, and in death we shall not be divided."
— Severus of Ravenna, Bishop of Ravenna (c. 348 AD). According to a traditional story, Severus laid himself in his family tomb alongside his dead wife and daughter, then died.

"Old though he be, he is the best of all." (Note: Also reported as, "I have not so behaved myself among you, that I should be ashamed to live longer: nor am I afraid to die, because we have a good master", then shouting "He is old but good!" three times when Simplician was mentioned, and as "I see the Lord Jesus at my bedside, smiling at me.")
— Ambrose, Bishop of Milan (4 April 397 AD), when Simplician was mentioned as his possible successor

"What dost thou here, thou cruel beast?"
— Martin of Tours, third bishop of Tours (8 November 397 AD), to the Devil

=== 5th to 14th centuries ===
"Glory to God for all things! Amen." (Note: Also reported as, "Glory to God in the highest.")
("δόξα τῷ θεῷ πάντων ἕνεκεν")
— John Chrysostom, Early Church Father and Archbishop of Constantinople (14 September 407), while traveling deeper into exile

"And me as I am going towards the God of mine, and I thank His name, as the Lord gave me everything bless His name. And I am telling you, to stand firm on your faith and to search for death for Christ for His name and you will find the permanent glory. I for my life glorified you and all of our race. And do not insult our home and do not abandon the love of the Greeks."
("მე ესე რა წარვალ წინაშე ღმრთისა ჩემისა, და ვმადლობ სახელსა მისსა, რამეთუ არა დამაკლო გამორჩეულთა წმიდათა მისთა. აწ გამცნებ თქუენ, რათა მტკიცედ სარწმუნოებასა ზედა სდგეთ და ეძიებდეთ ქრისტესთჳს სიკუდილსა სახელსა მისსა ზედა, რათა წარუვალი დიდება მოიგოთ. მე ჴორციელებრითა დიდებითა გადიდენ თქუენ ნათესავთა ჩემთა. და სახლსა ჩუენსა ნუ შეურაცხჰყოფთ, და სიყუარულსა ბერძენთასა ნუ დაუტეობთ".)
— Vakhtang I, Georgian monarch (502/22), to his son Dachi.

"Here must I stop. What follows, let Baithen write."
— Columba, Irish abbot and missionary evangelist (8 June 597), ceasing to transcribe a Psalter

"Will you govern it any better?"
— Phocas, Eastern Roman emperor (3 October 610), to his successor Heraclius before being executed

"Oh God, the Friend Most High!" (Note: Also reported as, "O Allah, be it so! Henceforth among the glorious host of paradise" and as "O Allah, pardon my sins. Yes, I come, among my fellow labourers on high.") or "The prayer, the prayer! And fear Allah with regard to those whom your right hands possess"
("اللَّهُمَّ الرَّفِيقَ الأَعْلَى") or :("الصلاة ، الصلاة! واتقوا الله في من يملك يمينكم")
— Muhammad, Prophet of God in Islam (8 June 632)

"My children, these fearful forests and these barren rocks shall be adorned with cities and temples, where the name of Jesus shall be openly adored. Ye shall abandon your precarious and hard chase, and assemble together under temples lofty as those pines, and graceful as the crown of the palm.
"Here shall my Saviour be known in all the simplicity of his doctrines. Ah! would that I might witness it; but I have seen those things in a vision. But I faint! I am weary! My earthly journey is finished! Receive my blessing. Go! and be kind one to another."
— Goar of Aquitaine, priest and hermit (6 July 649), dying in Oberwesel, Austrasia

"I desire that whatever merits I may have gained by good works may fall upon other people. May I be born again with them in the heaven of the blessed, be admitted to the family of Mi-le, and serve the Buddha of the future, who is full of kindness and affection. When I descend again upon earth, to pass through other forms of existence, I desire at every new birth to fulfill my duties toward Buddha, and arrive at the end to the highest perfect intelligence."
— Xuanzang, Chinese Buddhist monk, scholar, traveler and translator (5 February 664)

"You brothers must get along like fish and water and never fight each other for titles. If not, you will surely become the laughingstock of our neighbors."
— Yŏn Kaesomun, military dictator and generalissimo of Goguryeo (c. 666), to his sons

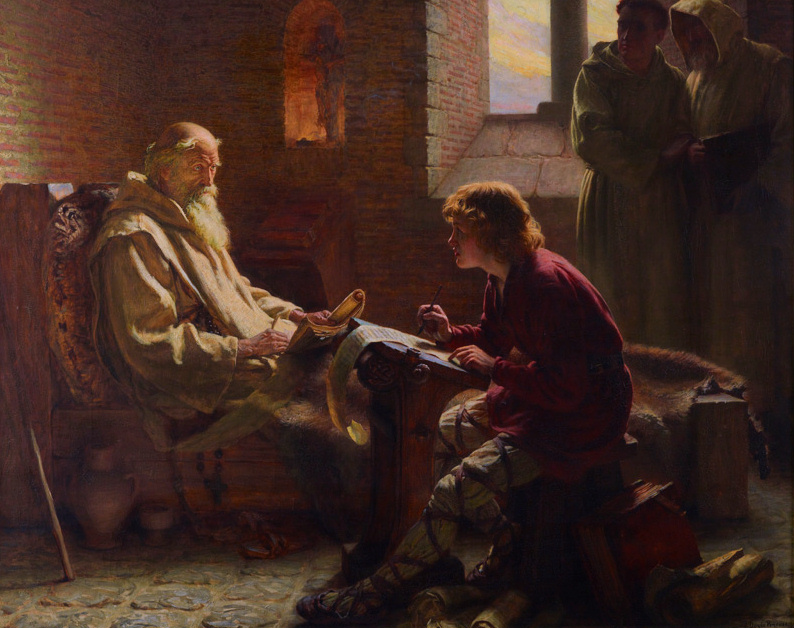
Bede translating the Gospel of John on his deathbed.

"You speak truth, all is finished now. Glory to God." (Note: Also reported as, "Glory be to the Father, and to the Son, and to the Holy Ghost.")
— Bede, English Benedictine monk (26 May 735); to a scribe to whom he was dictating a translation of the Gospel of John

"Lord, into Thy hands I commend my spirit."
— Charlemagne, European monarch (28 January 814), quoting Jesus

"Out! out!"
("Huz! huz!")
— Louis the Pious, King of the Franks (20 June 840), after turning his face to the wall before dying

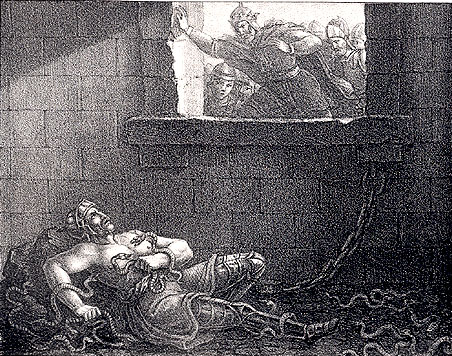
Death of Ragnar Lodbrok as imagined by 19th-century artist Hugo Hamilton

"The piglets would grunt if they knew how the old boar is suffering!"
("Gnyðja mundu grísir, ef þeir vissi, hvat inn gamli þyldi.")
— Ragnar Lodbrok, semi-legendary Norse chieftain (c. 850) after being cast into a snakepit by King Ælla of Northumbria

"Thou my dear son, set thee now beside me, and I will deliver thee true instructions. My son, I feel that my hour is coming. My countenance is wan. My days are almost done. We must now part. I shall to another world, and thou shalt be left alone in all my wealth. I pray thee (for thou art my dear child) strive to be a father, and a lord to thy people. Be thou the children's father, and the widow's friend. Comfort thou the poor, and shelter the weak; and, with all thy might, right that which is wrong. And, son, govern thyself, by law; then shall the Lord love thee, and God above all things shall be thy reward. Call thou upon him to advise thee in all thy need, and so shall he help thee, the better to compass that which thou wouldest." (Note: Also reported as, "I desire to leave to the men that come after me a remembrance of me in good works.")
— Alfred the Great, king of the Anglo-Saxons (26 October 899), to his son, Edward the Elder

"I have now reigned above fifty years in victory or peace; beloved by my subjects, dreaded by my enemies, and respected by my allies. Riches and honors, power and pleasure, have waited on my call, nor does any earthly blessing appear to have been wanting to my felicity. In this situation, I have diligently numbered the days of pure and genuine happiness which have fallen to my lot: they amount to Fourteen:—O man! place not thy confidence in this present world!" (Note: This quotation is traditional, and is described by Gibbon as "an authentic memorial which was found in the closet of the deceased caliph.")
— Abd al-Rahman III, first Caliph of Córdoba (15 October 961)

"You urge me in vain. I am not the man to provide Christian flesh for pagan teeth to devour, and it would be so acting if I delivered unto you that which the poor have laid by for their subsistence." (Note: Also reported as, "You urge me in vain. I am not the man to provide Christian flesh for Pagan teeth, by robbing my flock to enrich their enemy.")
("Christianorum carnes paganis dentibus conterendas dare. Ego equidem id faciam, si quod paupertas ad vitem paraverat, vestries hoc morsibus abutendum tradam.")
— Ælfheah of Canterbury, Archbishop of Canterbury (19 April 1012), refusing to pay ransom before being killed by his Danish captors

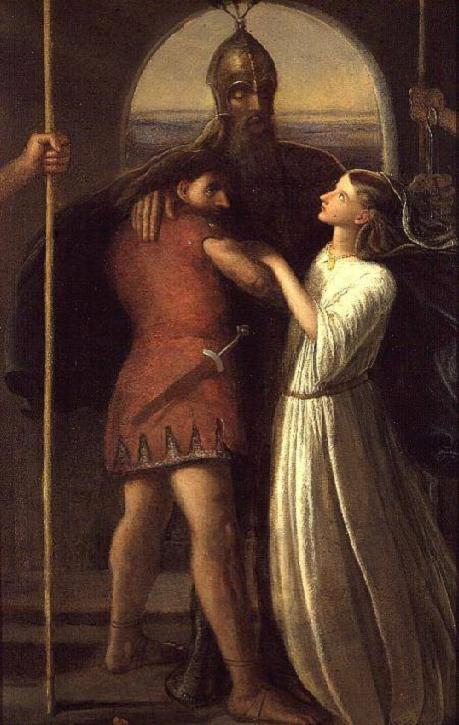
Death of Earl Siward by James Smetham

"How shameful it is that I, who could not die in so many battles, should have been saved for the ignominious death of a cow! At least clothe me in my impenetrable breastplate, gird me with my sword, place my helmet on my head, my shield in my left hand, my gilded battle-axe in my right, that I, the bravest of soldiers, may die like a soldier." (Note: Also reported as, "Lift me up that I may die standing, not lying down like a cow.")
— Siward, Earl of Northumbria (1055), dying of dysentery

"I have loved justice and hated iniquity; therefore I die in exile."
("Dilexi iustitiam et odivi iniquitatem propterea morior in exilio.")
— Pope Gregory VII (25 May 1085), in exile in Salerno due to his conflicts with Henry IV, Holy Roman Emperor

""I treated the native inhabitants of the kingdom with unreasonable severity, cruelly oppressed high and low, unjustly disinherited many, and caused the death of thousands by starvation and war, especially in Yorkshire....In mad fury I descended on the English of the north like a raging lion, and ordered that their homes and crops with all their equipment and furnishings should be burnt at once and their great flocks and herds of sheep and cattle slaughtered everywhere. So I chastised a great multitude of men and women with the lash of starvation and, alas! was the cruel murderer of many thousands, both young and old, of this fair people." (Note: Also reported as "To my Lady, the Holy Mary, I commend myself; that she, by her prayers, may reconcile her beloved Son to me.")
— William the Conqueror, King of England (9 September 1087), after hearing bell ringing Prime

"I shall not long hesitate between conscience and the Pope, (Note: Berengar in fact died during the sede vacante period between Pope Victor III and Pope Urban II.) for I shall soon appear in the presence of God, to be acquitted, I hope; to be condemned, I fear." (Note: Also reported as, "Today, on the day of His Epiphany, my Lord Jesus Christ will appear to me, either for Glory, as I in my repentance should like, and as I hope, or for Condemnation, as others would like, and as I fear.")
— Berengar of Tours, French Christian theologian (6 January 1088), dying in ascetic solitude on the island of Saint-Cosme near Tours

"Shoot, Walter, in the devil's name!"
— William II of England (2 August 1100), to Walter Tirel, who allegedly shot the king in a hunting accident

"Yes, if it be His will, I shall obey it willingly. But were He to let me stay with you a little longer till I have resolved a problem about the origin of the soul, I would gladly accept the boon; for I do not know whether anyone will work it out when I am gone. If I could but eat, I think I should pick up a little strength. I feel no pain in any part of my body; only I cannot retain nourishment, and that exhausts me." (Note: Also reported as, "I shall gladly obey His call; yet I should also feel grateful if He would grant me a little longer time with you, and if I could be permitted to solve a question–the origin of the soul.")
— Anselm of Canterbury, Archbishop of Canterbury (21 April 1109)

"I wished to do more harm than I could."
("Plus volui nocere quam potui.")
— Ranulf Flambard, Norman Bishop of Durham and government minister (5 September 1128)

"I don't know."
("Je ne sais.")
— Peter Abelard, French philosopher and theologian (21 April 1142)

"May God's will be done." (Note: Also reported as, "I know not to which I ought to yield—to the love of my children, which urges me to stay here, or to the love of God, which draws me to Him.")
— Bernard of Clairvaux, Burgundian abbot (20 August 1153), on being told he was dying

"Let us complete the Service of Offering, the rest of Holy Mass I will celebrate elsewhere!"
("Låt oss avsluta mässoffret, resten av gudstjänsten ska jag fira på annan ort!")
— Eric the Holy, Swedish king (18 May 1160) just before being decapitated by his successor Magnus Henriksson

"In death at last let me rest with Abelard."
— Héloïse, French nun, philosopher, writer, scholar and abbess (16 May 1163–64?)

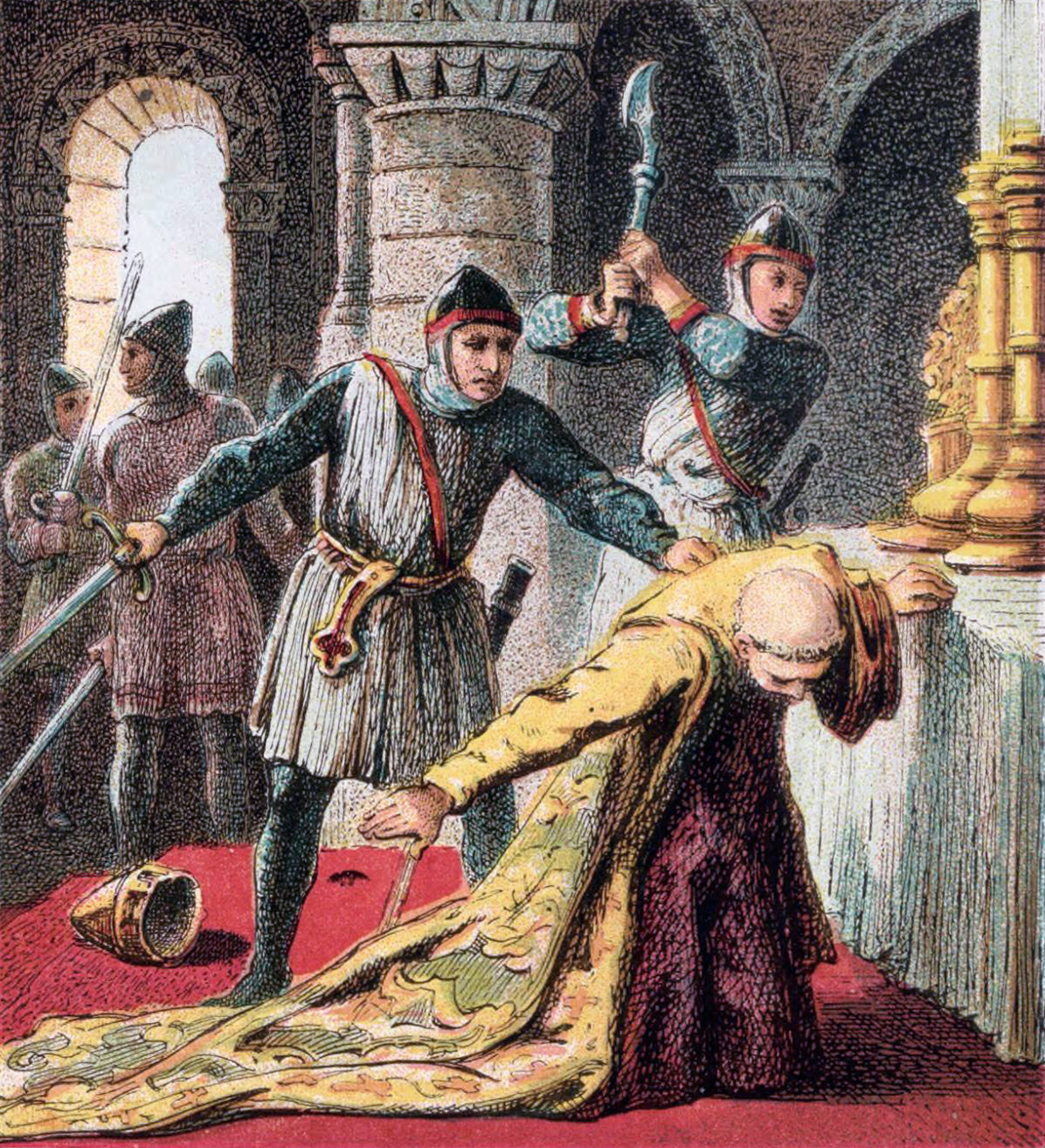
Murder of Thomas Becket.

"For the name of Jesus and the protection of the church I am ready to embrace death." (Note: Also reported as, "I commend myself to God, the Blessed Mary, St. Denis, and the patron saints of this Church" and "Father, into your hands I commend my spirit" (quoting Jesus).)
— Thomas Becket, Archbishop of Canterbury (29 December 1170), to his murderers

"Lord, have mercy upon me. Wilt thou break a bruised reed?"
— Andronikos I Komnenos, Byzantine Emperor (12 September 1185), lynched by his former subjects

"Now let the world go as it will; I care for nothing more."
— Henry II of England (6 July 1189), on being told his son John was one of those conspiring against him

"When I am buried, carry my winding-sheet on the point of a spear, and say these words: Behold the spoils which Saladin carries with him! Of all his victories, realms, and riches, nothing remains to him but this."
— Saladin, first sultan of Egypt and Syria (4 March 1193)

"Youth, I forgive thee! Take off his chains, give him 100 shillings, and let him go."
— Richard I of England (6 April 1199), with reference to the young man who had mortally wounded him with a crossbow

"Under the feet of the brethren."
— Saint Dominic, Castilian Catholic priest, founder of the Dominican Order, when asked where he wanted to be buried (6 August 1221)

"I have sinned against my brother, the ass." (Note: Also reported as, "The righteous wait expectant till I receive my recompense" (as members of his order knelt around his bed) and as "Welcome, Sister Death.")
— Francis of Assisi, Italian Catholic friar (3 October 1226)

"Let not my end disarm you, and on no account weep or keen for me, lest the enemy be warned of my death."
("Миний төгсгөлийг чамаас гуйхгүй, ямар ч шалтгаангүйгээр битгий уйлж, дуулгавартай байгаарай, дайсан минь миний үхлээс сэрэмжлүүлцгээе.")
— Genghis Khan, warlord and khan of Mongolia (18 August 1227)

"I see my God. He calls me to Him."
— Anthony of Padua, Portuguese Catholic priest and Franciscan friar (13 June 1231)

"Don't cut my face."
("Ikke hugg meg i ansiktet")
— Skule Bårdsson, Norwegian nobleman (24 May 1240), before being killed by supporters of King Haakon IV of Norway

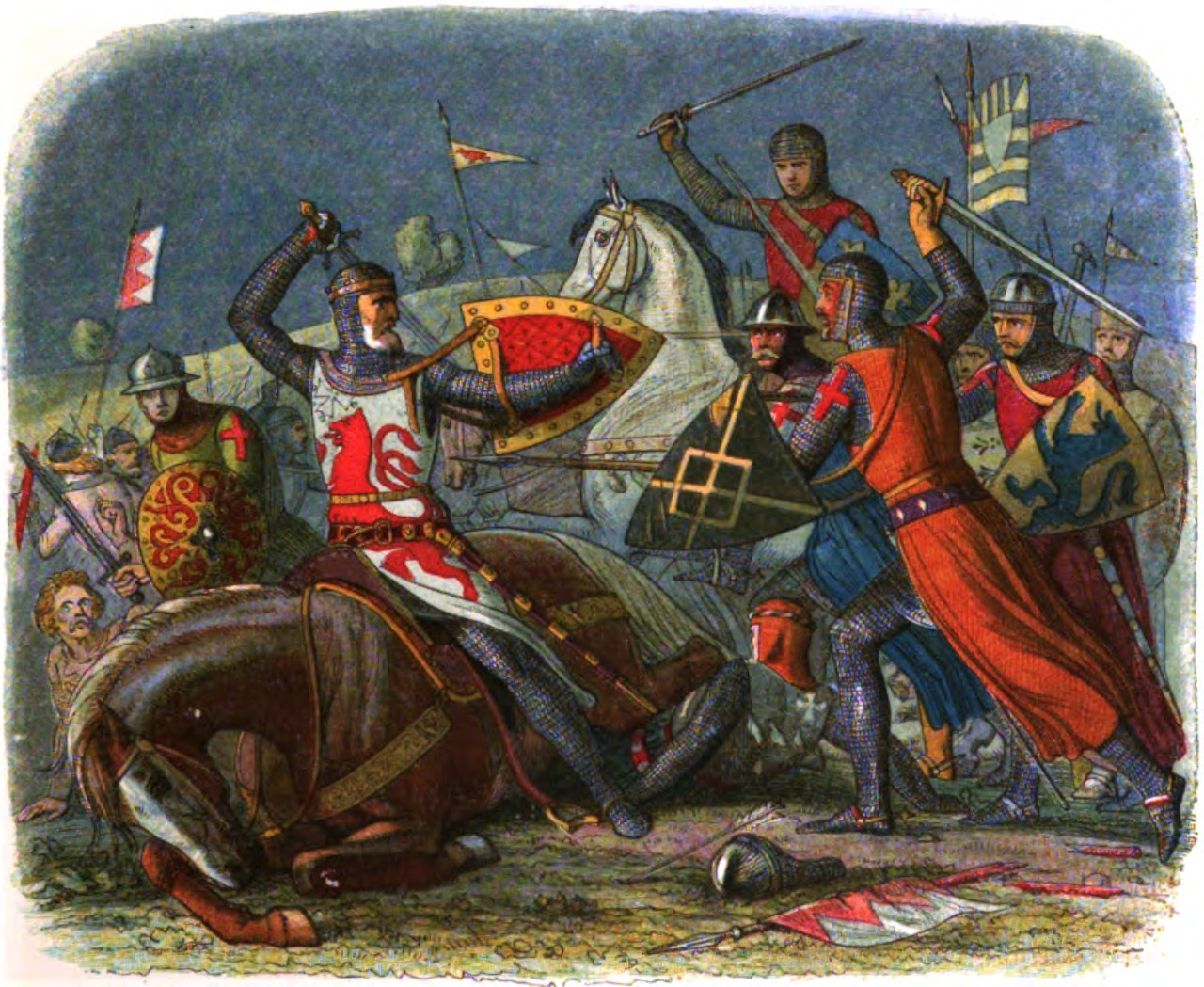
Death of Simon de Montfort.

"By the arm of St. James, it is time to die." (Note: Also reported as, "Commend your souls to God, for our bodies are the foes'!")
— Simon de Montfort, 6th Earl of Leicester (4 August 1265), before dying at the Battle of Evesham

"O my mother! how deep will be thy sorrow at the news of this day!"
— Conradin, last direct heir of the House of Hohenstaufen (29 October 1268), prior to execution by beheading at the age of 16

"I will enter thy house. I will worship in Thy sanctuary." (Note: Also reported as, "I will enter now into the house of the Lord" and as "We will go to Jerusalem.")
— Louis IX of France (25 August 1270)

"I have written and taught much about this very holy Body, and about the other sacraments in the faith of Christ, and about the Holy Roman Church, to whose correction I expose and submit everything I have written."
— Thomas Aquinas, Italian dominican theologian and philosopher (7 March 1274), as he received his last rites

"I am on the way to Spires to visit the kings, my predecessors."
— Rudolf I of Germany (15 July 1291); he was buried at Speyer Cathedral

"Carry my bones before you on your march, for the rebels will not be able to endure the sight of me, alive or dead."
— Edward I of England (7 July 1307), to his son, Edward II of England, while dying during a war with Scotland

"Pope Clement, Chevalier Guillaume de Nogaret, King Philip! I summon you to the Tribunal of Heaven before the year is out!" (Note: Also reported as, "Let evil swiftly befall those who have wrongly condemned us. God will avenge us.")
— Jacques de Molay, last Grand Master of the Knights Templar (11 or 18 March 1314), before being burned at the stake

"King of heaven, do thou have mercy on me, for the king of earth hath forsaken me." (Note: Egbert incorrectly names the king as Edward III.)
— Thomas, 2nd Earl of Lancaster (22 March 1322), before beheading for treason against his cousin, Edward II of England

"I have not told half of what I saw."
("Non ho detto metà di quello che ho visto.")
— Marco Polo, Venetian traveller in Asia (c. January 9, 1324), responding to skepticism about the content of his memoir, The Travels of Marco Polo

"I give thee thanks, O God, for all thy benefits, and with all the pains of my soul I humbly beseech thy mercy to give me remission of those sins I have wickedly committed against thee; and of all mortal men whom willingly or ignorantly I have offended, with all my heart I desire forgiveness."
— Edward the Black Prince, heir to the English throne (8 June 1376)

"Jesus."
— Edward III of England (21 June 1377), kissing a crucifix

"Ah, Jesus!"
— Charles V of France (16 September 1380)

"Because they are all under my command, they are sworn to do what I bid them."
— Wat Tyler, leader of the Peasants' Revolt (15 June 1381), prior to being killed by officers loyal to Richard II of England

"I am a dead man! Lord, have mercy upon me!"
— Gaston III, Count of Foix (1 August 1391)

=== 15th century ===
"Never yet has death been frightened away by screaming."
— Timur, Turco-Mongol conqueror, founder of the Timurid Empire (17–19 February 1405)

"We are now to sail home, at once!"
("Nu seglar vi hem, genast!")
— Margaret, Queen of Denmark, Norway and Sweden (28 October 1412) afflicted with the plague in Flensburg harbor

"O, holy simplicity!" (Note: Also reported as, "No, I take God to witness I preached none but his own pure doctrines, and what I taught I am ready to seal with my blood" (refusing to recant).)
("O Sancta Simplicitas!")
— Jan Hus, Czech theologian and church reformer (6 July 1415). While being burned at the stake for heresy, he saw an old woman throw a small amount of brushwood onto the fire.

"O Lord God, Father Almighty, have mercy upon me, and be merciful unto mine offences, for thou knowest how sincerely I have loved Thy truth." (Note: Also reported as, "Bring thy torch hither; do thine office before my face; had I feared death I might have avoided it" (to his executioner) and as "This soul in flames I offer, Christ, to thee.")
— Jerome of Prague, Czech scholastic philosopher and theologian (30 May 1416), burned for heresy

"Make my skin into drumheads for the Bohemian cause."
— Jan Žižka, Czech general (11 October 1424) (Note: Year of death incorrectly given as 1492 by Salsa.)

"I die content, after living the prescribed time, and leaving you, my sons, in affluence and health, placed in such a situation as, if you follow my example, will enable you to live honored and respected. I recall nothing in my life with so much pleasure as having given offence to no one, and having tried to serve all men as far as possible. I advise you to act thus, if you would live securely, accepting only those honors as the laws and favor of the state confer upon you; for it is the exercise of power that has been violently—not voluntarily—obtained, that occasions hatred and strife."
— Giovanni di Bicci de' Medici, Italian banker (February 1429)

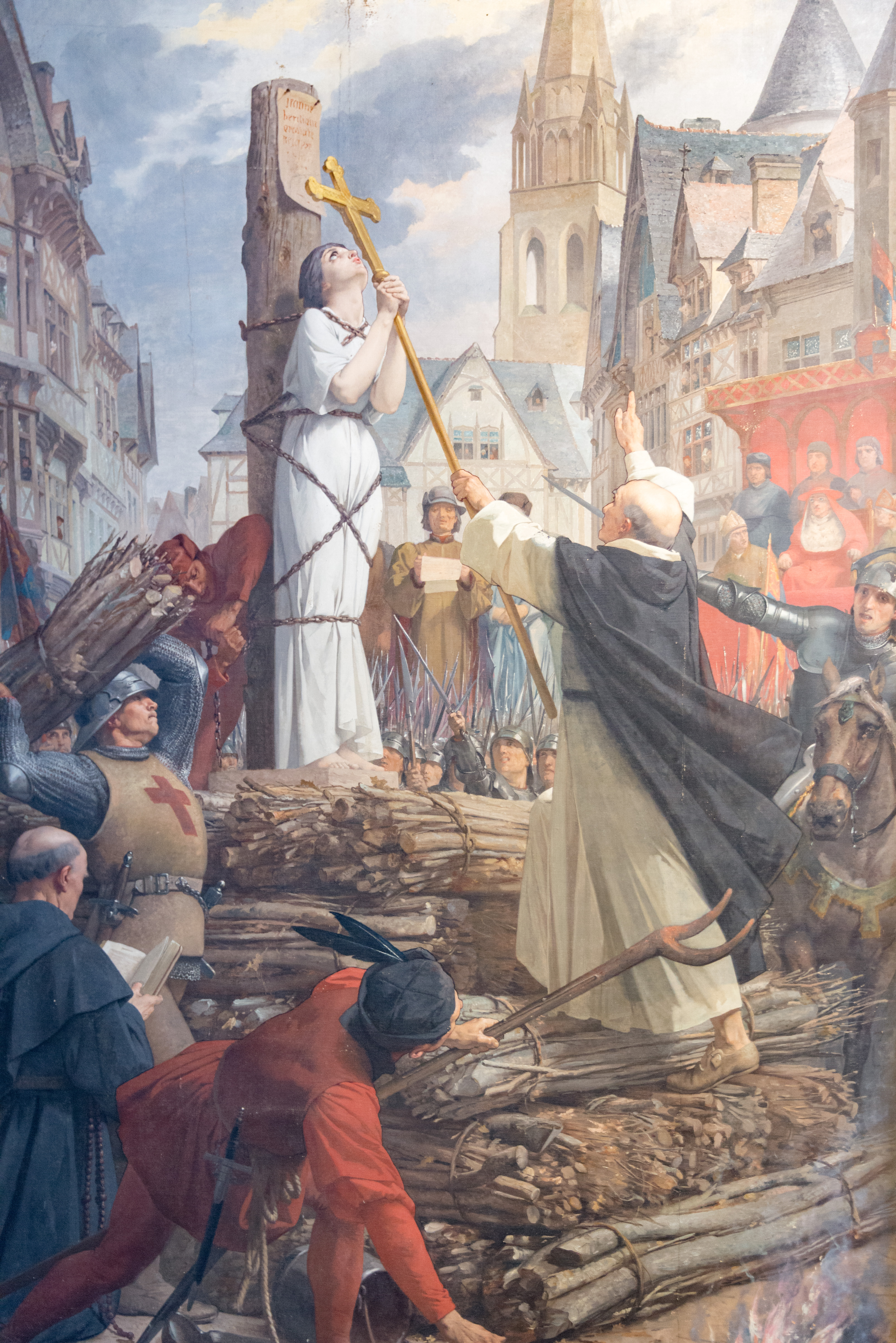
Joan of Arc at the stake.

"Hold the cross high so I may see it through the flames!" (Note: Also reported as, "Those voices have not deceived me. My revelations came from God; and all that I have done, has been done by his command" and as "Jesus! Jesus! Jesus! Blessed be God.")
— Joan of Arc, French military leader and mystic (30 May 1431), while she was burning at the stake

"Fie on life! Speak no more of it to me."
("Fi de la vie! qu'on ne m'en parle plus.")
— Margaret Stewart, Dauphine of France (16 August 1445)

"O Gabriel, Gabriel, better would it have been for you to have been neither pope, nor cardinal, nor bishop, but to have finished your days as you commenced them, following peaceably in the monastery the exercises of your order."
— Pope Eugene IV (born Gabriele Condulmer) (23 February 1447)

"Will not all my riches save me? What, is there no bribing death?" (Note: Also reported as, "I pray you all pray for me" and as "Why should I die, having so much riches? If the whole realm would save my life, I am able either by policy to get it, or by riches to buy it. Fie! will not death be hired, nor will money do nothing? When my nephew of Bedford died, I thought myself half up the wheel; but when I saw my other nephew of Gloucester deceased, then I thought myself to be equal with kings, and so thought to increase my treasure in order to have worn a triple crown. But I see now the world fadeth me, and so I am deceived,—praying you all to pray for me.")
— Henry Beaufort (11 April 1447), Cardinal, Bishop of Winchester

"God forbid that I should live as an Emperor without an Empire. As my city falls, I will fall with it. Whosoever wishes to escape, let him save himself if he can, and whoever is ready to face death, let him follow me."
- Constantine XI (29 May 1453), Byzantine Empire, before charging into Ottoman lines during the Fall of Constantinople, he was never seen again.

"Were I born the son of a farmer, and became a friar of the Abrojo, and not the king of Castile."
"Naciera yo hijo de un labrador e fuera fraile del Abrojo, que no rey de Castilla"
— John II of Castile (22 July 1454), King of Castile

"I was born as a lily in the garden, and like the lily I grew, as my age advanced / I became old and had to die, and so I withered and died."
— Pachacuti (c. 1471/1472), Sapa Inca and founder of the Inca Empire, poem composed on his deathbed

"Our Lady of Embrun, my good mistress, help me."
("Notre dame d'Embrun, ma bonne maitresse, aidez moi.")
— Louis XI, King of France (30 August 1483)

"Treason! treason!"
— Richard III of England (22 August 1485), when deserted by his best troops at the Battle of Bosworth Field

"I know only Jesus the crucified."
— Wessel Gansfort, Dutch theologian and humanist (4 October 1489)

"I hope never again to commit a mortal sin, nor even a venial one, if I can help it."
— Charles VIII of France (7 April 1498)

"My Lord died innocent of all crimes, for my sins; and shall not I willingly give my soul for the love of Him." (Note: Also reported as, "O Florence, what has thou done to-day?" and as "The Lord hath suffered as much for me.")
— Girolamo Savonarola, Italian Dominican friar (23 May 1498), when asked before his execution if he was resigned to death

=== 16th century ===
"All right, all right, I'm coming. Wait a moment."
("Va bene, va bene, arrivo. Aspettate un momento.")
— Pope Alexander VI (18 August 1503)

"Into Your hands, O Lord, I commend my spirit."
("In manus tuas, Domine, commendo spiritum meum.")
— Christopher Columbus, Italian explorer (20 May 1506), quoting Jesus

"We heartily desire our executors to consider how behoofful it is to be prayed for."
— Henry VII of England (21 April 1509)

"I believe."
— Georges d'Amboise, French Roman Catholic cardinal and minister of state (25 May 1510)

"That is false. I always have served my king loyally and sought to add to his domains." (Note: Also reported as, "That is a great falsehood! As sure as my last moments are at hand; I never had a thought except of the most faithful and loyal devotion to my king nor had any other desire than to increase his dominions with power and ability.")
— Vasco Núñez de Balboa, Spanish explorer, governor and conquistador (January 1519), on hearing a herald call him a "usurper of the rights of the Crown" while on the way to his execution by decapitation

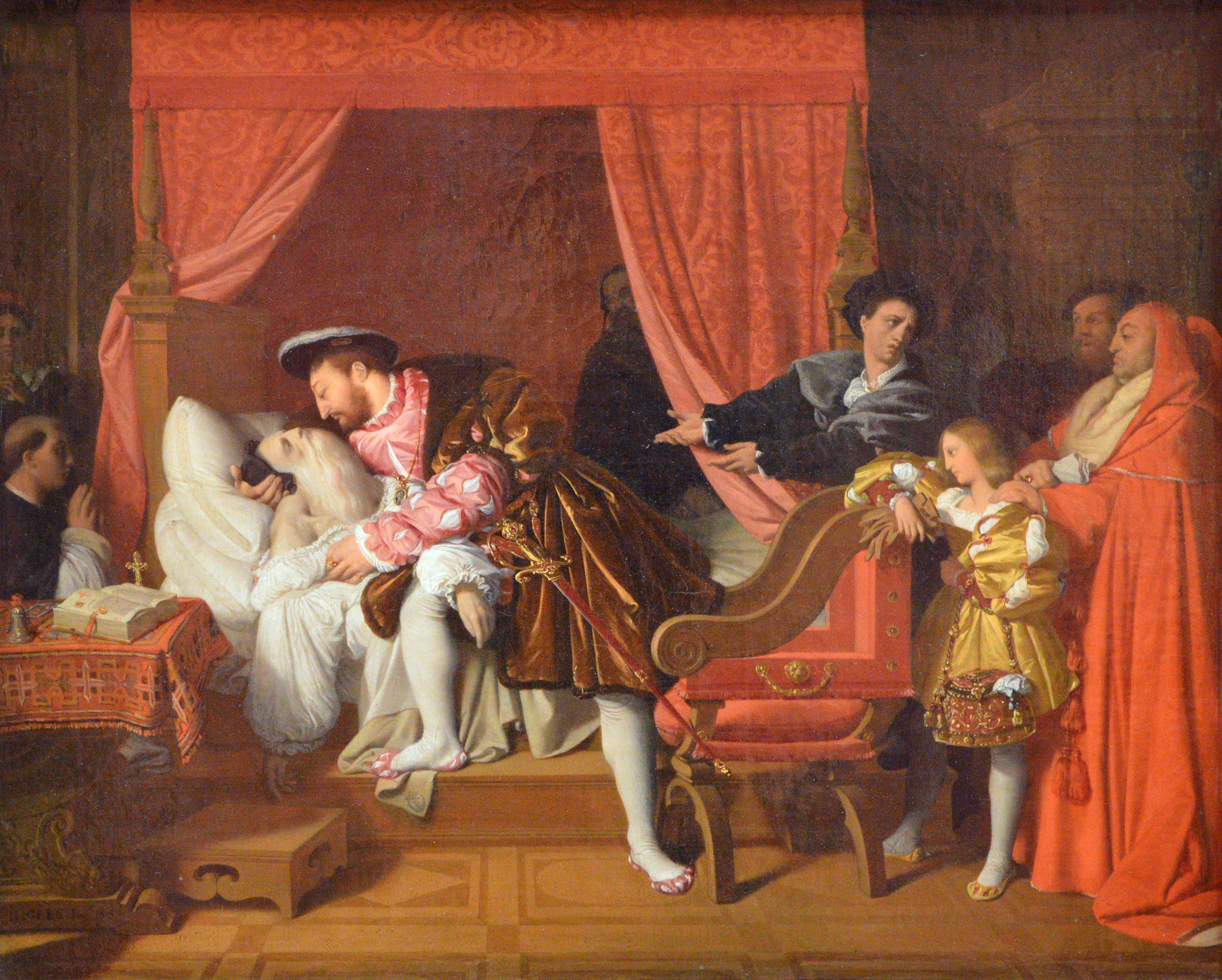
Death of Leonardo da Vinci, painted by Ingres.

"I have offended God and mankind because my work did not reach the quality it should have." (Note: Snopes rates this account of Leonardo's last words as "Unproven".)
("Ho offeso Dio e l'umanità perché il mio lavoro non ha raggiunto la qualità che dovrebbe avere.")
— Leonardo da Vinci, Italian artist and scientist (2 May 1519), to King Francis I of France

"Happy."
— Raphael, Italian artist (6 April 1520)

"I confide to your care my beloved children, the most precious jewels I can leave you. The great monarch beyond the ocean will interest himself to see that they come into their inheritance, if you present before him their just claims. I know your master will do this, if for no other reason, then for the kindness I have shown the Spaniards, though it has occasioned my ruin. For all my misfortunes, Malinche, I bear you no ill will."
— Moctezuma II, Huey Tlatoani or Emperor of the Aztec Empire (29 June 1520), to Hernán Cortés (calling him by the name of his interpreter, La Malinche)

"I have been murdered; no remedy can prevent my speedy death."
— Pope Leo X (1 December 1521), rumored to have died by poison

"I am curious to see what happens in the next world to one who dies unshriven."
— Pietro Perugino, Italian artist (1523), declining the last rites

"I have already confessed my sins to God."
— Franz von Sickingen, German knight and Protestant leader (7 May 1523), when his chaplain asked if he wanted to confess prior to his death defending his castle

"At least I may die facing the enemy." (Note: Also reported as, "Pity me not: I die as a man of honor ought, in the discharge of my duty: they indeed are objects of pity who fight against their king, their country and their oath....God and my country!" (to Charles III, Duke of Bourbon, who had expressed pity for him).)
— Pierre Terrail, seigneur de Bayard, French knight (30 April 1524), mortally wounded at the Battle of the Sesia (1524)

"I desire to go to hell, and not to heaven. In the former place I shall enjoy the company of popes, kings, and princes, while in the latter are only beggars, monks, hermits, and apostles."
— Niccolò Machiavelli (21 June 1527), Italian Renaissance diplomat, philosopher and writer

"How long, Lord, shall darkness cover this land? How long wilt thou suffer this tyranny of men? Lord Jesus, receive my spirit."
— Patrick Hamilton, Scottish churchman (29 February 1528), while being burned at the stake

"Master Kyngston, I pray you have me commended to his Grace, and beseech him, in my behalf, to call to mind all things that have passed between us, especially concerning good Queen Katharine and himself, and then shall his Grace's conscience know whether I have offended him or not. He is a prince of most royal courage, and rather than miss any part of his will, he will endanger one-half of his kingdom; and, I do assure you, I have often knelt before him, sometimes for three hours together, to persuade him from his appetite, and could not prevail.
"And, Master Kyngston, had I but served God as diligently as I have served the king, he would not have given me over in my gray hairs. But this is my just reward for my pains and study, not regarding my service to God, but only my duty to my Prince." (Note: Also reported as, "Master Kingston, farewell! My time draweth on fast. Forget not what I have said and charged you withal; for when I am dead ye shall, peradventure, understand my words better.")
— Thomas Wolsey, English archbishop, statesman and cardinal (29 November 1530); to the Lieutenant of the Tower of London, after falling ill on the way to London under arrest for treason

"I give your brothers to your keeping. Be faithful to them and all the people."
— Babur, founder of the Mughal Empire and first Emperor of the Mughal dynasty (26 December 1530)

"I pray you, good people, be not the worse to these men on my account, as though they were the authors of my death."
— Thomas Bilney, English Christian martyr (19 August 1531). While he awaited burning for heresy, the friars and people present argued over who was responsible for Bilney's death; the friars threatened to withhold alms from the people if they were blamed

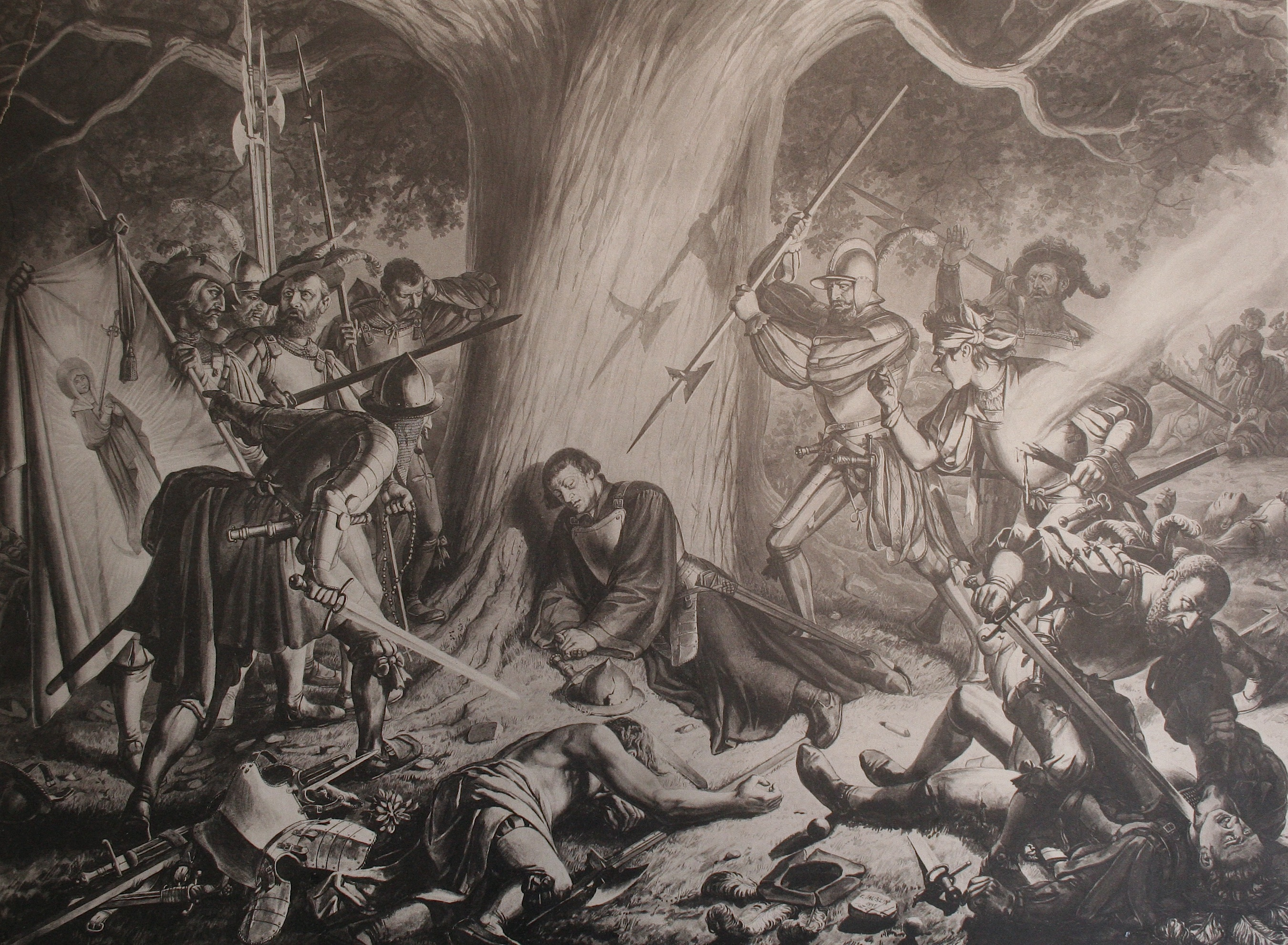
"The murder of Zwingli", by Karl Jauslin (1842–1904).

"Can this be considered a calamity? Well! they can, indeed, kill the body, but they are not able to kill the soul."
— Huldrych Zwingli, priest and leader of the Reformation in Switzerland (11 October 1531), mortally wounded at the Battle of Kappel

"O ye papists: behold, ye look for miracles, and here now ye may see a miracle, for in this fire I feel no more pain than if I were in a bed of down, but it is to me as sweet as a bed of roses."
— James Bainham, English lawyer and Protestant reformer (30 April 1532), while burning at the stake for heresy

"That is enough to last till I get to Heaven."
— William Warham, Archbishop of Canterbury (22 August 1532), when a servant told him he had thirty pounds left

"Father, into Thy hands I commend my spirit."
— Ludovica Albertoni, Italian noblewoman, professed member of the Third Order of Saint Francis (31 January 1533), quoting Jesus

"This is not my home."
— Ludovico Ariosto, Italian poet (6 July 1533)

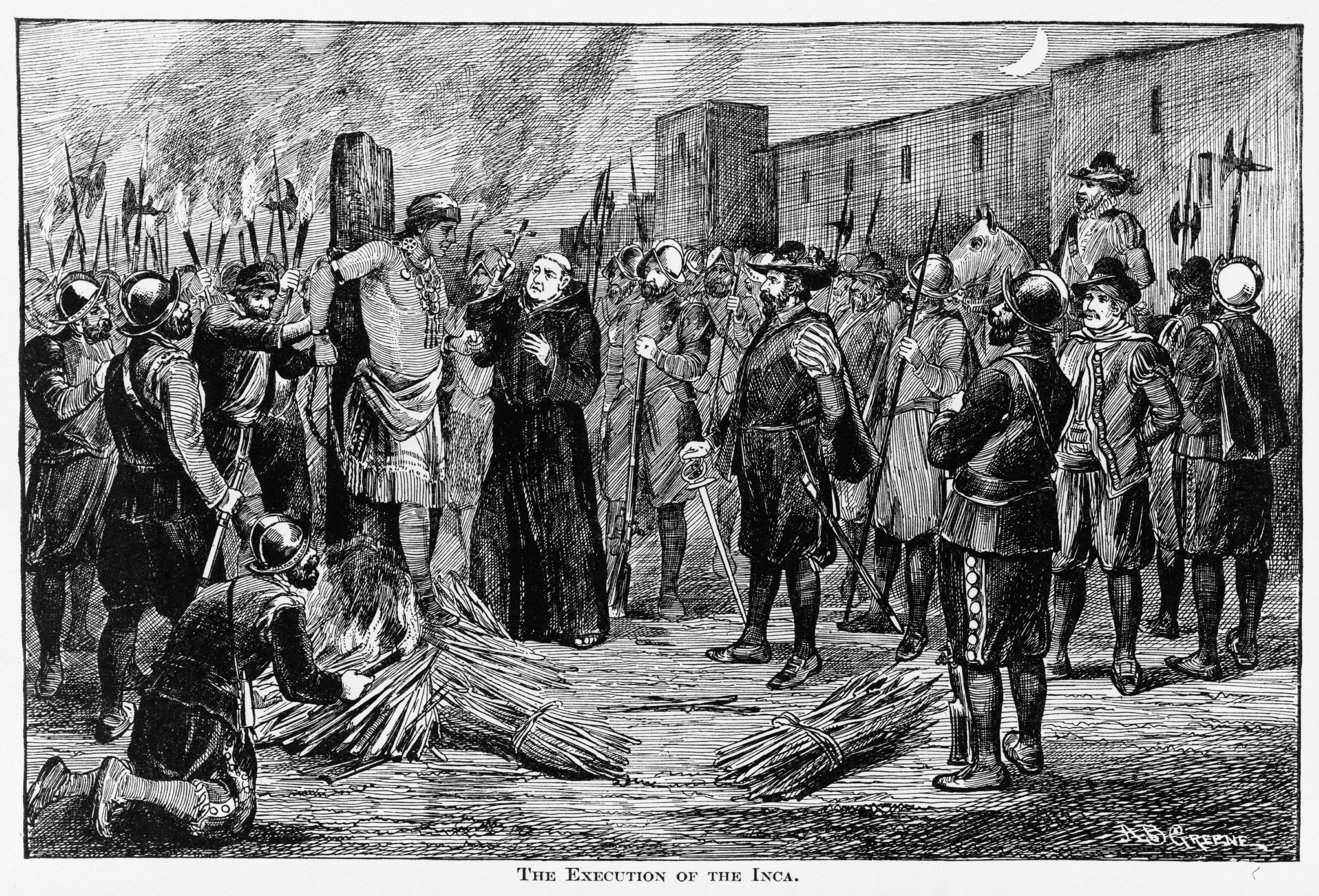
The execution of Atahualpa.

"What have I done, or my children, that I should meet such a fate? And from your hands, too, you who have met with friendship and kindness from my people who have received nothing but benefits from my hands."
— Atahualpa, last Sapa Inca of the Inca Empire (26 July 1533), prior to execution by strangling

"Begone thou wretched beast, which hast utterly undone me." (Note: Agrippa's last words according to a traditional story.)
("Abi perdita bestia, que me perdidisti.")
— Heinrich Cornelius Agrippa, German polymath and occultist (18 February 1535), to his black dog (allegedly his familiar)

"I die the King's good servant, and God's first." (Note: Also reported as, "I pray you, I pray you Mr Lieutenant, see me safely up. And for my coming down let me shift for myself", "Stay friend till I put aside my beard; for that never committed treason", and as "Pluck up thy spirits, man, and be not afraid to do thine office. My neck is very short; take heed therefore and do not strike awry for the saving of thine honesty" (to the executioner).)
— Thomas More, Lord High Chancellor of Britain (6 July 1535), prior to beheading for treason

"Mine eyes desire thee only. Farewell."
("Oculi mei te solum desiderant. Vale.")
— Catherine of Aragon, Queen of England (7 January 1536), closing her last letter to her former husband, Henry VIII of England

"Masters, I pray you pray for me, for I have deserved this death."
— Mark Smeaton, musician in the household of Queen Anne Boleyn (17 May 1536), prior to beheading for alleged treason and adultery

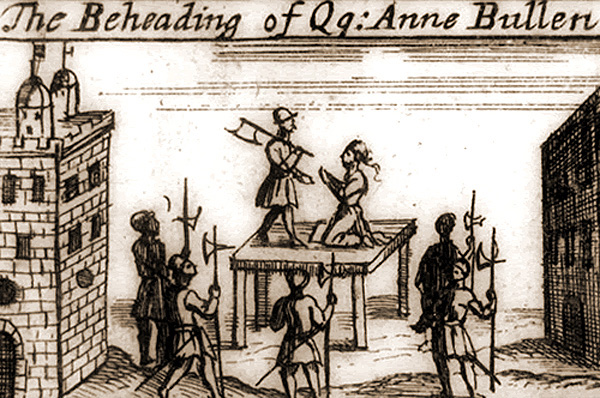
Execution of Anne Boleyn.

"Oh God, have pity on my soul. Oh God, have pity on my soul." (Note: Also reported as, "Lord Jesus, receive my soul" and as "It [her neck] is very small, very small.")
— Anne Boleyn, Queen of England (19 May 1536), prior to her execution by beheading

"Lord! Lord! make an end! make an end!"
("Domine! Domine! fac finem! fac finem!")
— Erasmus, Dutch Catholic priest and humanist scholar (12 July 1536)

"Lord, open the King of England's eyes." (Note: Also reported as, "Lord, open the eyes of the King of England.")
— William Tyndale, English scholar and Bible translator (c. 6 October 1536), before being strangled and burned at the stake for heresy

"None but Christ! None but Christ!"
— John Lambert, English Protestant martyr (22 November 1538), while being burned at the stake

"May an avenger arise from my bones."
("Exariare aliquis nostris ex ossibus ultor.")
— Filippo Strozzi the Younger, Florentine banker (18 December 1538). He carved this line from Virgil's Aeneid on a mantelpiece with his sword as his suicide note.

"Death cannot destroy us, for it is destroyed already by Him for Whose sake we suffer."
— Jerome Russell, Franciscan friar (1539), burned for heresy in Scotland

"God be merciful to me, a sinner; Lord Jesus receive my spirit! Miserere mei Deus secundum magnam misericordiam tuam."
— Thomas Forret, vicar of Dollar, Clackmannanshire, burned for heresy (28 February/1 March 1539), quoting Psalm 51

"Did you envy my happiness?"
— Francisco de San Roman, Spanish merchant and Protestant martyr (1540). While burning at the stake, he moved his head in a way which caused the friars to believe he had recanted. Upon his removal from the flames, he asked them this question and was then returned to the fire.

"I die in the traditional faith."
— Thomas Cromwell, 1st Earl of Essex (28 July 1540), prior to beheading for treason and heresy

"I trust in no good works that ever I did, but only in the death of Christ. I do not doubt but through Him to inherit the kingdom of Heaven. But imagine not that I speak against good works, for they are to be done, and verily they that do them not shall never enter into the kingdom of God."
— Robert Barnes, English reformer and Protestant martyr (30 July 1540), while being burned at the stake for heresy

"Blessed are they who suffer persecution for righteousness' sake."
— Margaret Pole, Countess of Salisbury (27 May 1541), quoting Matthew 5:10 while an incompetent executioner attempted to behead her

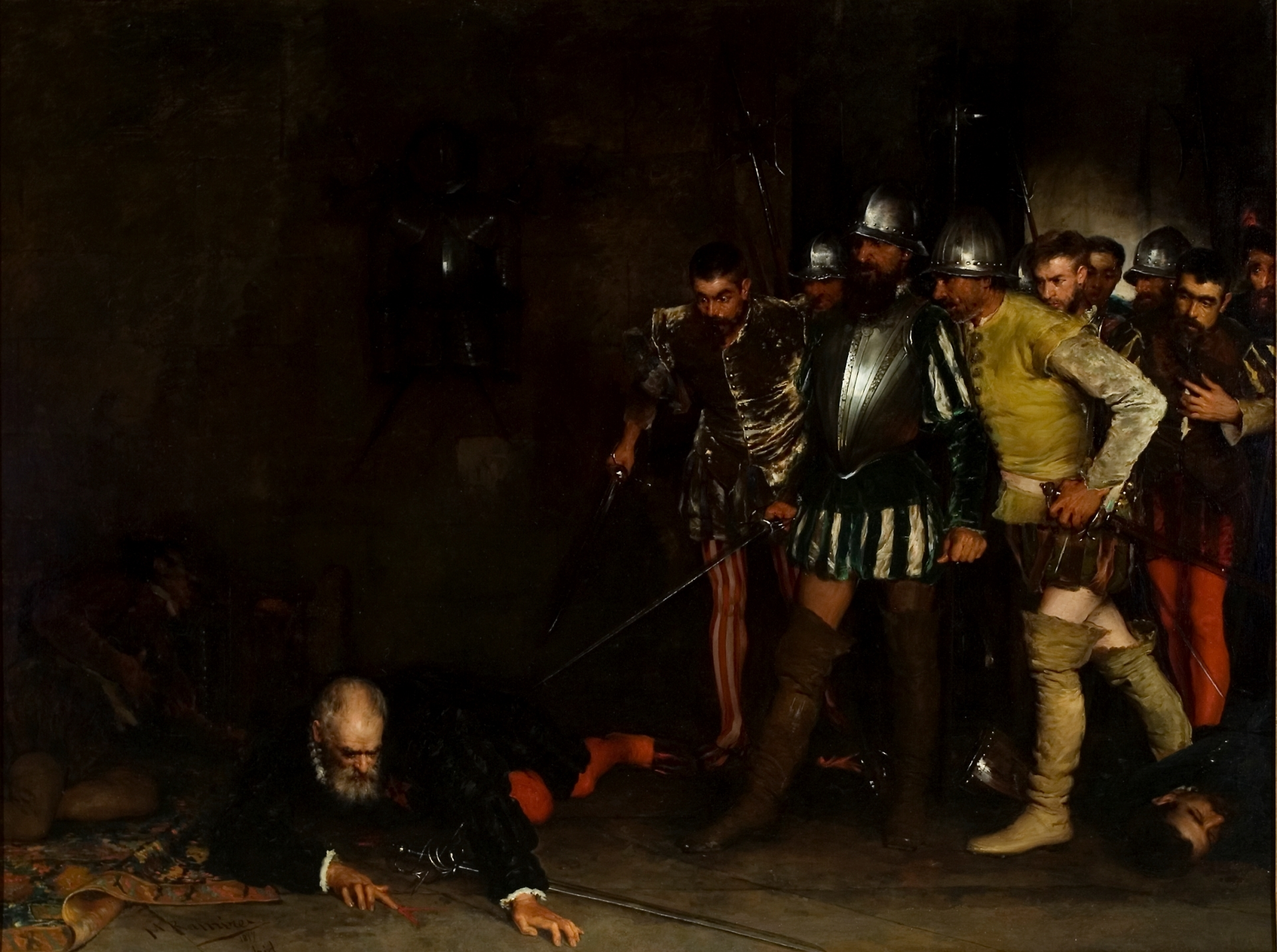
Death of Francisco Pizarro.

"Jesu!"
— Francisco Pizarro, Spanish conquistador (26 June 1541), after being stabbed by assassins

"Luis de Moscoso."
— Hernando de Soto, Spanish explorer and conquistador (21 May 1542), naming his successor

"It [the Crown of Scotland] came with a lass, and it will go with a lass." (Note: "It came with a lass" may have referred either to Marjorie Bruce or to Scota.)
("It came wi a lass, it'll gang wi a lass.")
— James V of Scotland (15 December 1542), on being informed of the birth of his daughter and successor, Mary, Queen of Scots

"Now, O Lord, set thy servant free."
— Nicolaus Copernicus, mathematician and astronomer (24 May 1543), paraphrasing Luke 2:29

"We are beggars, this is true." (Note: Also reported as, "Father, into Thy hands I commend my spirit" (quoting Jesus) and as "Yes" (when asked whether he stood by his teachings of Scriptural doctrine).)
("Wir sind Bettler, Hoc est Verum.")
— Martin Luther, German theologian who started the Protestant Reformation (18 February 1546)

"Lo! here is a token that I forgive thee; my heart, do thine office." (Note: Also reported as, "For the sake of the true gospel, given one by the grace of God, I suffer this day with a glad heart. Behold and consider this visage. Ye shall not see me change color. I fear not this fire.")
— George Wishart, Scottish Protestant reformer and martyr (1 March 1546), kissing one of his executioners on the cheek after the man asked for his forgiveness

"I am a priest; I am a priest! Fie! Fie! All is gone."
— David Beaton, Archbishop of St Andrews, final Scottish Cardinal prior to the Scottish Reformation (29 May 1546), during his assassination

"I came not hither to deny my Lord and Master." (Note: Also reported as, "I come not here to deny my Lord and Master.")
— Anne Askew, English writer and poet (16 July 1546), when offered letter of pardon before being burned at the stake for heresy

"All is lost! Monks, monks, monks!"
— Henry VIII, King of England (28 January 1547)

"Farewell, and remember me." (Note: Also reported as, "I never departed from the true church.")
— Margaret of Valois-Angoulême, Queen of Navarre (21 December 1549)

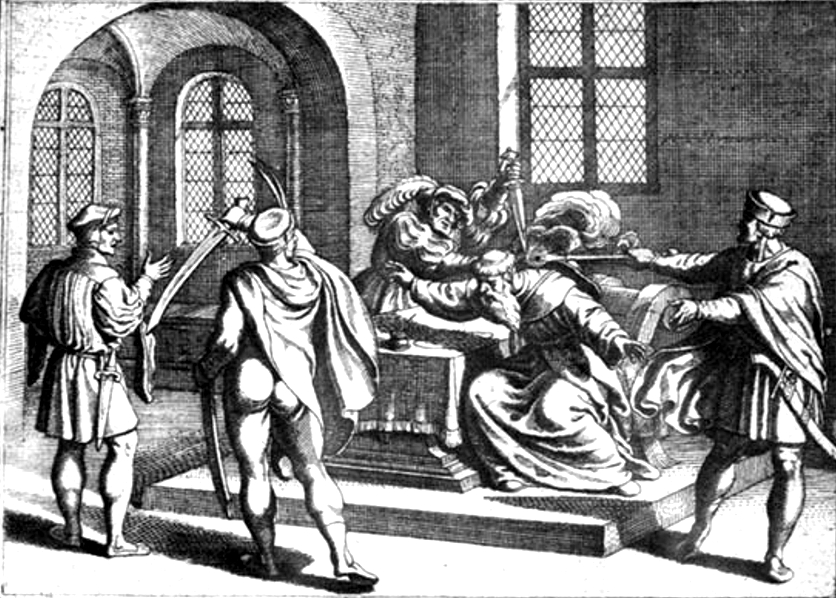
Assassination of George Martinuzzi.

"Jesu, Maria!"
— George Martinuzzi, Archbishop of Esztergom (16 December 1551), while being assassinated

"Bring down the curtain, the farce is played out." (Note: Also reported/translated as, "Let down the curtain, the farce is over", "I owe much; I have nothing; the rest I leave to the poor", "I am just going to leap into the dark" and "Je m'en vais chercher le grand peut-être" ("I am going to seek a great perhaps").)
— François Rabelais, French writer and physician (1553)

"Lord take my spirit."
— Edward VI of England (6 July 1553)

"Jesus, Son of the eternal God, have mercy on me!"
— Michael Servetus, Spanish theologian, physician and humanist (27 October 1553), while being burned at the stake for heresy on a pyre of his own books

"Lord, into Thy hands I commend my spirit." (Note: Also reported as, "My soul is as pure from trespass against Queen Mary, as innocence is from injustice; I only consented to the thing I was forced into.")
— Lady Jane Grey, de facto Queen of England and Ireland (12 February 1554), quoting Jesus prior to her beheading

"What I then said I unsay now; and what I now say is the truth." (Note: Also reported as, "That which I said then I said, but that which I say now is true.")
— Thomas Wyatt the Younger, English politician and leader of Wyatt's rebellion (11 April 1554), exculpating Princess Elizabeth and Edward Courtenay, 1st Earl of Devon, prior to execution by beheading for treason

"Lord, receive my spirit."
— John Rogers, English clergyman, Bible translator and commentator (4 February 1555), prior to burning at the stake for heresy

"Welcome the cross of Christ! welcome everlasting life!"
— Laurence Saunders, English Protestant martyr (8 February 1555), kissing the stake at which he was to be burned

"If you love my soul, away with it!" (Note: Also reported as, "Good people, give me more fire" and as "Lord Jesus, receive my spirit.")
— John Hooper, Anglican Bishop of Gloucester and Worcester, Protestant martyr (9 February 1555), refusing a pardon prior to burning at the stake for heresy

"Merciful Father of heaven, for Jesus Christ my Savior's sake, receive my soul into Thy hand." (Note: Also reported as, "Lord receive my spirit.")
— Rowland Taylor, English Protestant martyr (9 February 1555), while being burned at the stake for heresy

"I am not afraid. Lord, Lord, Lord, receive my spirit!"
— William Hunter, English silk-weaver and Protestant martyr (27 March 1555), while being burned at the stake for heresy

"Be of good comfort, brother, for we shall have a merry supper with the Lord this night: if there be any way to heaven on horseback or in fiery chariots, this is it."
— John Bradford, English Reformer and Protestant martyr (1 July 1555), to John Leaf, a fellow martyr, prior to being burned at the stake

"Let the flames come near me. I cannot burn! I cannot burn!"
— Nicholas Ridley, Bishop of London (16 October 1555). While burning at the stake for heresy, only his lower limbs burned away.

"Be of good comfort, Master Ridley, and play the man; we shall this day light such a candle by God's grace in England as (I trust) shall never be put out."
— Hugh Latimer, former Bishop of Worcester (16 October 1555); to Nicholas Ridley while they were burning at the stake for heresy

"Like Peter, I have erred, unlike Peter, I have not wept."
("Erravi cum Petro, sed non flevi cum Petro.")
— Stephen Gardiner, English bishop and politician (12 November 1555)

"Lord Jesus, receive my spirit... I see the heavens open and Jesus standing at the right hand of God." (Note: Also reported as, "This is the hand that wrote it, and therefore shall it suffer first punishment" (referring to his right hand, with which he had signed his recantations) and "I have sinned, in that I have signed with my hand what I did not believe with my heart. When the flames are lit, this hand shall be the first to burn", or "That unworthy hand! That unworthy hand!", after which he reportedly thrust his right hand into the heart of the fire.)
— Thomas Cranmer, Archbishop of Canterbury (21 March 1556), alluding to Acts 7:56 prior to execution by burning

"Now I'm oiled. Keep me from the rats." (Note: Also reported as, "Keep the rats away now that I am all greased up.")
— Pietro Aretino, Italian writer and blackmailer (21 October 1556), after receiving the last rites

"Lord Jesu!"
— Albert Alcibiades, Margrave of Brandenburg-Kulmbach (8 January 1557)

"Lord, have mercy upon me! Pray, people, while there is time."
— Walter Milne, last Protestant martyr burned in Scotland before the Scottish Reformation (28 April 1558)

"Now, Lord, I go! Ay, Jesus!"
— Charles V, Holy Roman Emperor (21 September 1558), looking at a crucifix

"After I am dead, you will find Calais written upon my heart."
— Mary I of England (17 November 1558). French forces had captured Calais from England earlier that year.

"Nothing else but heaven."
— Philip Melanchthon, German Lutheran reformer (19 April 1560), when asked if he wanted anything (Note: Year of death incorrectly given by Marvin as 1568.)

"Farewell, thou who art so beautiful and so cruel; who killest me and whom I cannot cease to love."
("Adieu, toi si belle et si cruelle, qui me tues et que je ne puis cesser d'aimer.")
— Pierre de Bocosel de Chastelard, French poet (22 February 1563), addressing the window of Holyrood Palace before being hanged for hiding under the bed of Mary, Queen of Scots

"I'm still learning." (Note: Also reported as, "My soul I resign to God, my body to the earth, and my worldly possessions to my relations; admonishing them that through their lives and in the hour of death they think upon the sufferings of Jesus Christ. And I do desire that my body be taken to the city of Florence for its last rest.")
("Ancora imparo.")
— Michelangelo, Italian artist and poet (18 February 1564)

"Thou, Lord, bruisest me; but I am abundantly satisfied, since it is from thy hand."
— John Calvin, French theologian and Protestant reformer, principal developer of Calvinism (27 May 1564)

"Tomorrow, at sunrise, I shall no longer be here."
("Vous ne me trouverez pas vivant au lever du soleil.")
— Nostradamus, French seer (2 July 1566), correctly predicting his death

"I desire to die and be with Christ."
— Roger Ascham, English scholar and didactic writer (30 December 1568)

"Victory! Victory!"
("Vittoria! Vittoria!")
— Bartolomeo Bartocci, Italian trader (25 May 1569), while burning at the stake for heresy

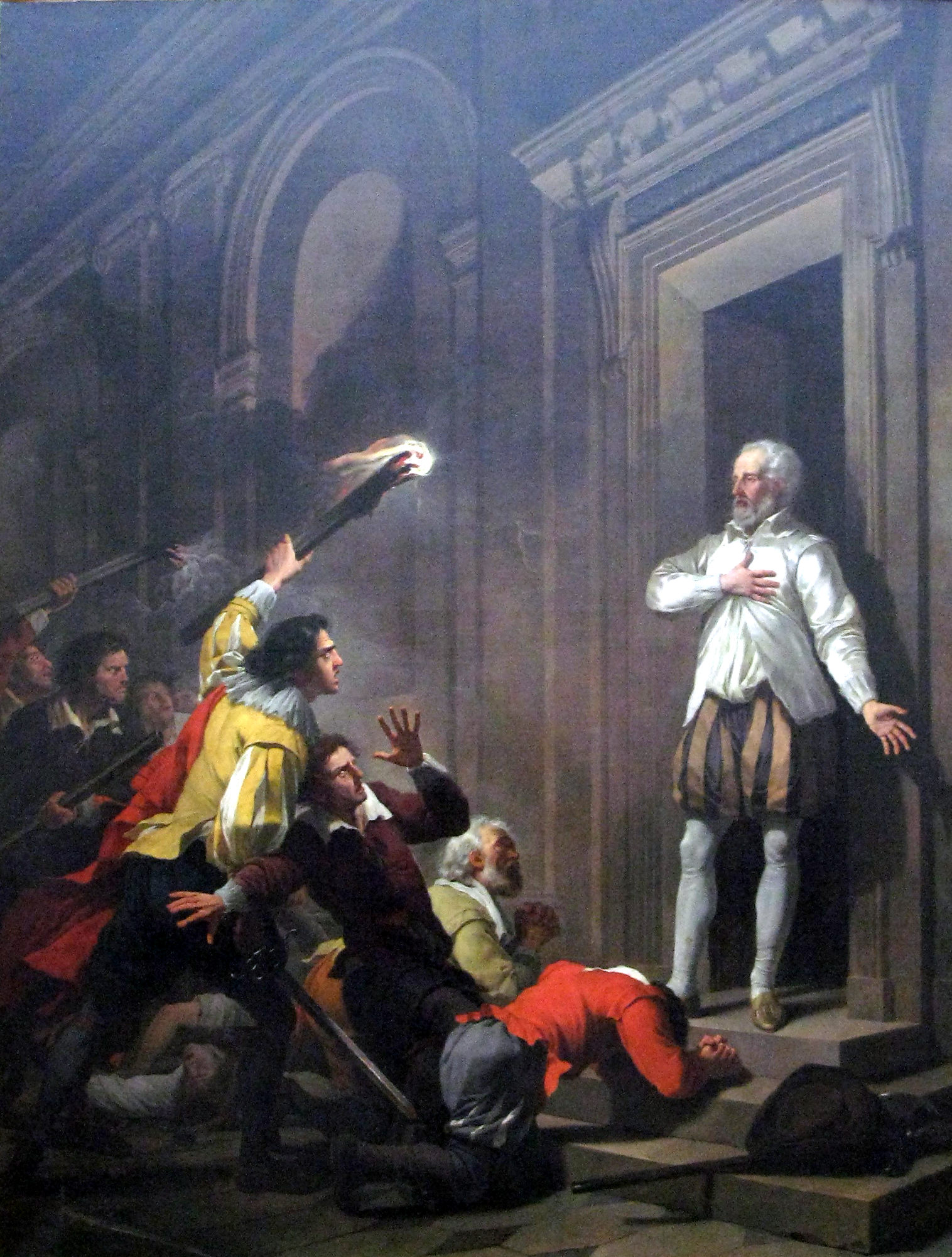
Admiral de Coligny impressing his murderers, by Joseph-Benoît Suvée

"I am he; respect my gray hairs, young man!"
— Gaspard II de Coligny, Admiral of France (24 August 1572), in response to one of his assassins asking, "Art thou Coligny?"

"Now it is come." (Note: Also reported as, "Live in Christ, live in Christ, and the flesh need not fear death.")
— John Knox, founder of the Presbyterian Church of Scotland (24 November 1572)

"Nurse, nurse, what murder! what blood! Oh! I have done wrong. God pardon me!"
— Charles IX of France (30 May 1574)

"Lord God, into Thy Holy Hands I commit my spirit."
("Herre Gud, uti dina heliga händer antvardar jag min anda.")
— Eric XIV, ex-King of Sweden (26 February 1577) when dying in prison from arsenic poisoning, quoting Jesus

"Royal freedom will only be lost with life"
("A liberdade real só há de perder-se com a vida")
— Sebastian of Portugal (4 August 1578), when being advised to surrender, and to hand over his sword to the victors of the Battle of Alcácer Quibir

"It matters little to me; for if I am but once dead they may bury me or not bury me as they please. They may leave my corpse to rot where I die if they wish."
— George Buchanan, Scottish historian and humanist scholar (28 September 1582), when his servant asked who would pay for his burial after Buchanan told him to distribute his property among the poor

"Over my spirit flash and float in divine radiancy the bright and glorious visions of the world to which I go." (Note: Also reported as, "Lord, now is the time to arise and go! The good time which I welcome, which is Thy will; the hour when I must leave my exile, and my soul shall enjoy the fulfillment of all her desire!")
— Teresa of Ávila, Spanish Carmelite nun, mystic and author (4 or 15 October 1582); (Note: Teresa died during the night of Spain's transition from the Julian to the Gregorian calendar.) last words uncertain

"Too late."
— Fernando Álvarez de Toledo, 3rd Duke of Alba (11 December 1582), on learning that the King was to visit him

"We are as neare to Heaven by sea as by land."
— Humphrey Gilbert, English adventurer and explorer (9 September 1583), prior to sinking of HMS Squirrel with all hands

"God have mercy upon me, and upon this poor nation."
("Mon Dieu, ayez pitié de mon âme; mon Dieu, ayez pitié de ce pauvre peuple.")
— William the Silent, Prince of Orange (10 July 1584), assassinated by Balthasar Gérard

"Jesus! I pardon you."
— Vittoria Accoramboni, Italian noblewoman (22 December 1585), kneeling before a crucifix

"The murder of the Queen had been represented to me as a deed lawful and meritorious. I die a firm Catholic."
— Anthony Babington, English gentleman, conspirator in the Babington Plot (20 September 1586), prior to being hanged, drawn and quartered for high treason

"Take it; thy need is greater than mine." (Note: Also reported as, "I would not change my joy for the empire of the world.")
— Philip Sidney, English poet and soldier (17 October 1586), mortally wounded at the Battle of Zutphen, passing a cup of water to another wounded soldier

"O Lord, into Thy hands I commend my spirit."
("In manus, Domine, tuas commendo animam meam.")
— Mary, Queen of Scots (8 February 1587), quoting Jesus prior to execution by beheading after being found guilty for plotting to assassinate her first cousin once removed, Elizabeth I of England.

"Let the pulse beat as it may, we know the mercy of God will never fail."
— Frederick II of Denmark (4 April 1588)

"Absit mihi gloriari nisi in Cruce Domini Nostri Jesu Christi [Far from me to glory except in the cross of Jesus Christ]. Good people, I beseech God to send all felicity."
— George Beesley, English Roman Catholic priest and martyr (2 July 1591), prior to execution

"It is time for Matins."
— John of the Cross, Spanish Catholic priest and mystic (14 December 1591), dying at the stroke of midnight

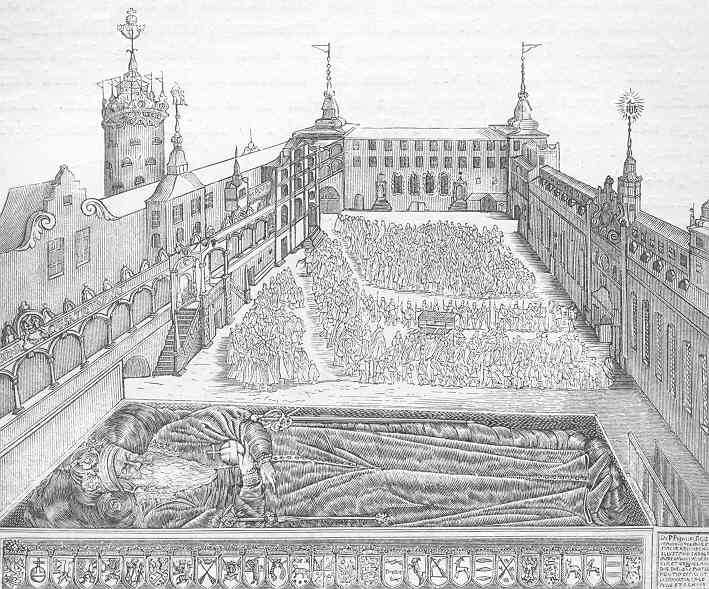
Funeral of King John III of Sweden

"I know that my Redeemer liveth."
("Scio quod redemptor mios vivit.")
— John III, King of Sweden (17 November 1592)

"A bishop ought to die on his legs."
— John Woolton, Bishop of Exeter (13 March 1594)

"Lord, into Thy hands I commend my spirit."
— Torquato Tasso, Italian poet (25 April 1595), quoting Jesus

"Life or death is welcome to me; and I desire not to live, but so far as I may be serviceable to God and His church."
— William Whitaker, Calvinistic Anglican churchman, academic and theologian (4 December 1595)

"Do not announce my death."
("나의 죽음을 알리지 마라.")
— Yi Sun-sin, Korean naval commander (16 December 1598), telling his nephew to hide his death by gunshot from his soldiers to avoid demoralizing them during the Battle of Noryang

"I die a martyr and willingly – my soul shall mount up to heaven in this chariot of smoke."
— Giordano Bruno, Italian Dominican friar (17 February 1600), prior to burning at the stake for heresy

"Good Doctor, God hath heard my daily petitions, for I am at peace with all men, and He is at peace with me; and from that blessed assurance I feel that inward joy which this world can neither give nor take from me: my conscience beareth me this witness, and this witness makes the thoughts of death joyful. I could wish to live to do the Church more service, but cannot hope it, for my days are passed as a shadow that returns not."
— Richard Hooker, English priest and theologian (3 November 1600)

=== 17th century ===
"May I not seem to have lived in vain."
("Ne frustra vixisse videar.")
— Tycho Brahe, Danish astronomer (24 October 1601), to his assistant Johannes Kepler

"All my possessions for a moment of time." (Note: Also reported as, "I will have no rogue's son in my seat" (responding to the suggestion of Edward Seymour, Lord Beauchamp, as her possible heir).)
— Elizabeth I, queen regnant of England (24 March 1603)

"I cannot bear that any misunderstanding should subsist between you and those who have for so many years shared in my toils and been the companions of my glory."
— Akbar, third Mughal emperor (27 October 1605), to his nobles and his son, Jahangir; he then asked their forgiveness if he had ever wronged them

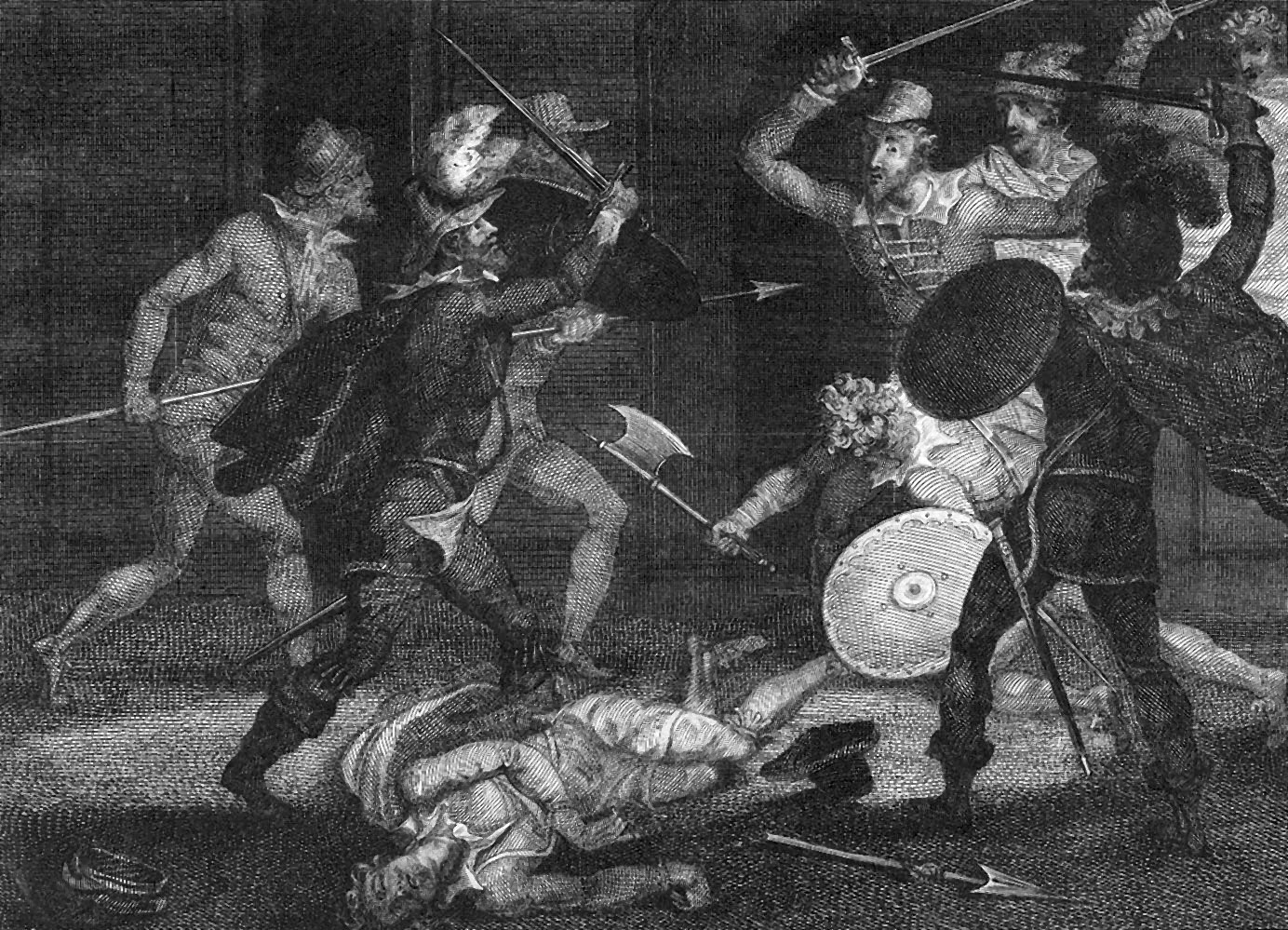
Death of Robert Catesby and Thomas Percy.

"Stand by me, Tom, and we will die together."
— Robert Catesby, leader of the Gunpowder Plot (8 November 1605). Catesby and Thomas Percy were shot by armed men led by Sir Richard Walsh.

"Now I am going."
— Paolo Farinati, Italian Mannerist painter (1606), on his deathbed. His wife replied, "I will bear you company, my dear husband," and also died.

"I begin to perceive and feel the joys of eternal life. I shall soon behold Him, who was sacrificed for men; I long for the blessed sight. All else is to me as dross: there is nothing that could make me wish to live one hour longer."
— Joseph Justus Scaliger, French Calvinist religious leader and scholar (21 January 1609)

"I am wounded."
— Henry IV of France (14 May 1610), while being assassinated by stabbing

"I receive absolution upon this condition."
— François Ravaillac, French Catholic zealot, assassin of Henry IV of France (27 May 1610), receiving conditional absolution prior to his execution due to his insistence that he had no accomplices

"Ease and pleasure quake to hear of death; but my life, full of cares and miseries, desireth to be dissolved."
— Robert Cecil, 1st Earl of Salisbury, English statesman (24 May 1612)

"I would say 'somewhat,' but I cannot utter it." (Note: Also reported as, "Tie a rope round my body, pull me out of bed, and lay me in ashes, that I may die with repentant prayers to an offended God. O! I in vain wish for that time I lost with you and others in vain recreations.")
— Henry Frederick, Prince of Wales (6 November 1612), when asked if he was in pain

"If there be here any hidden Catholics, let them pray for me, but the prayers of heretics I will not have."
— John Ogilvie SJ (10 March 1615), hanged, drawn and quartered at Glasgow Cross because of having preached the Catholic religion, then illegal in Scotland, and for refusing to pledge allegiance to King James VI of Scotland.

"I am Sanada Nobushige, no doubt an adversary quite worthy of you, but I am exhausted and can fight no longer. Go on, take my head as your trophy." (Note: Also reported as, "Who dares to take my head?")
— Sanada Yukimura, Japanese samurai warrior (3 June 1615), to his foes prior to his death at the Battle of Tennōji

"Already my foot is in the stirrup."
— Miguel de Cervantes, Spanish novelist (22 April 1616)

"Come Lord Jesu, come quickly, finish in me the work that Thou has begun; into Thy hands, O Lord, I commend my spirit, for Thou has redeemed me. O God of truth, save me Thy servant, who hopes and confides in Thee alone; let Thy mercy, O Lord, be shewn unto me; in Thee have I trusted, O Lord, let me not be confounded for ever."
— Robert Abbot, Anglican clergyman and academic (2 March 1617)

"All must die, but 'tis enough that the child liveth."
— Pocahontas (March 1617), dying of an unknown illness

"What dost thou fear? Strike, man, strike!" (Note: Also reported as, "Why dost thou not strike. Strike, man!" Raleigh also said to his executioner, "Let us dispatch. At this hour my ague comes upon me. I would not have my enemies think I quaked with fear." After he was allowed to see the axe that would behead him, he mused: "This is a sharp Medicine, but it is a Physician for all diseases and miseries" (also quoted as "Doest thou think that I am afraid of it? This is that that will cure all sorrows" or "'Tis a sharp remedy, but a sure one for all ills"). Another version of Raleigh's last words is "So the heart be right, it is no matter which way the head lieth", "It matters little how the head lies", or "No matter how the head lies, so that the heart be right.")
— Walter Raleigh, English poet, soldier and courtier (29 October 1618), as he lay ready to be beheaded in the Old Palace Yard at the Palace of Westminster

"They sweat in extremes, for fear of the unwarlike; I am dying undisturbed."
("Illi in extremis prae timore imbellis sudor; ego imperturbatus morior.")
— Lucilio Vanini, Italian philosopher, physician and freethinker (9 February 1619), prior to execution by strangling and burning for atheism and blasphemy

"Make it short. Make it short." (Note: Also reported/translated as, "Be quick about it. Be quick" and as "Oh, God, what then is man?")
("Maak het kort, maak het kort.")
— Johan van Oldenbarnevelt, Dutch statesman (13 May 1619), to his executioner

"Oh, would to God I had never reigned! Oh, that those years I have spent in my kingdom I had lived a solitary life in the wilderness! Oh, that I had lived alone with God! How much more secure should I now have died! With how much more confidence should I have gone to the throne of God! What doth all my glory profit, but that I have so much the more torment in my death?"
— Philip III of Spain (31 March 1621)

"Now I have overcome."
— Johann Arndt, German Lutheran theologian (11 May 1621), to his wife

"Jesus, Jesus, Jesus." (Note: Also reported as, "It is safest to trust in Jesus" (in response to being asked whether it was safer to trust in the Virgin Mary or in Jesus).)
— Robert Bellarmine, Italian Jesuit and Roman Catholic cardinal (17 September 1621)

"All my life I have carried myself gracefully."
— Rodrigo Calderón, Count of Oliva (21 October 1621), when his confessor chastised him for his attention to his appearance prior to his execution by beheading

"Be thou everlasting."
— Paolo Sarpi, Venetian historian, prelate, scientist, canon lawyer and statesman (15 January 1623), referring to Venice

"Thy creatures, O Lord, have been my books, but Thy Holy Scriptures much more. I have sought Thee in the fields and gardens, but I have found Thee, O God, in Thy Sanctuary—Thy Temple." (Note: Also reported as, "My name and memory I leave to men's charitable speeches, to foreign nations and to the next age" (the last line of his will).)
— Francis Bacon, English philosopher and statesman (9 April 1626)

"Blessed be God, though I change my place, I shall not change my company; for I have walked with God while living, and now I go to rest with God."
— John Preston, Anglican minister, master of Emmanuel College, Cambridge (20 July 1628)

"Villaine!" (Note: Also reported as, "Traitor, thou killest me" and as "God's wounds! the villain hath killed me.")
— George Villiers, 1st Duke of Buckingham (23 August 1628); to his assassin, John Felton, after being stabbed by him

"Hold your tongue; your wretched style only makes me out of conceit with them." (Note: Also reported/translated as, "Your ungrammatical style is putting me off them.")
— François de Malherbe, French poet, critic and translator (16 October 1628), listening on his deathbed to his confessor describing the glories of heaven

"I am the man."
— John Felton, assassin of George Villiers, 1st Duke of Buckingham (29 November 1628), referring to the killing of Buckingham before being executed by hanging.

"I do bless.—May Jesus and Mary bless, rule and govern."
— Pierre de Bérulle, French Roman Catholic cardinal and statesman (2 October 1629), blessing his congregation while celebrating Mass

"It comes at last, the happy day: Let thanks be given to God in heaven, while we learn pleasure in His way."
— Agrippa d'Aubigné, French poet, soldier, propagandist and chronicler (29 April 1630)

"I were miserable, if I might not die." (Note: Also reported as, "I repent of my life except that part of it which I spent in communion with God, and in doing good" and as "Though of myself I have nothing to present to my God but sin and misery; yet I know He looks not upon me now as I am in myself, but as I am in my Saviour, and hath given me even now some testimonies by His Holy Spirit that I am of the number of His elect. I am therefore full of inexpressible joy, and shall die in peace.")
— John Donne, English poet, scholar and soldier, Dean of St Paul's (31 March 1631)

"Now, God be with you, my dear children; I have breakfasted with you, and shall sup with my Lord Jesus Christ this night." (Note: These last words have been misattributed to Robert the Bruce. Marvin quotes the detailed story providing the context for Bruce's last words.)
— Robert Bruce of Kinnaird, Moderator of the General Assembly of the Church of Scotland (27 July 1631)

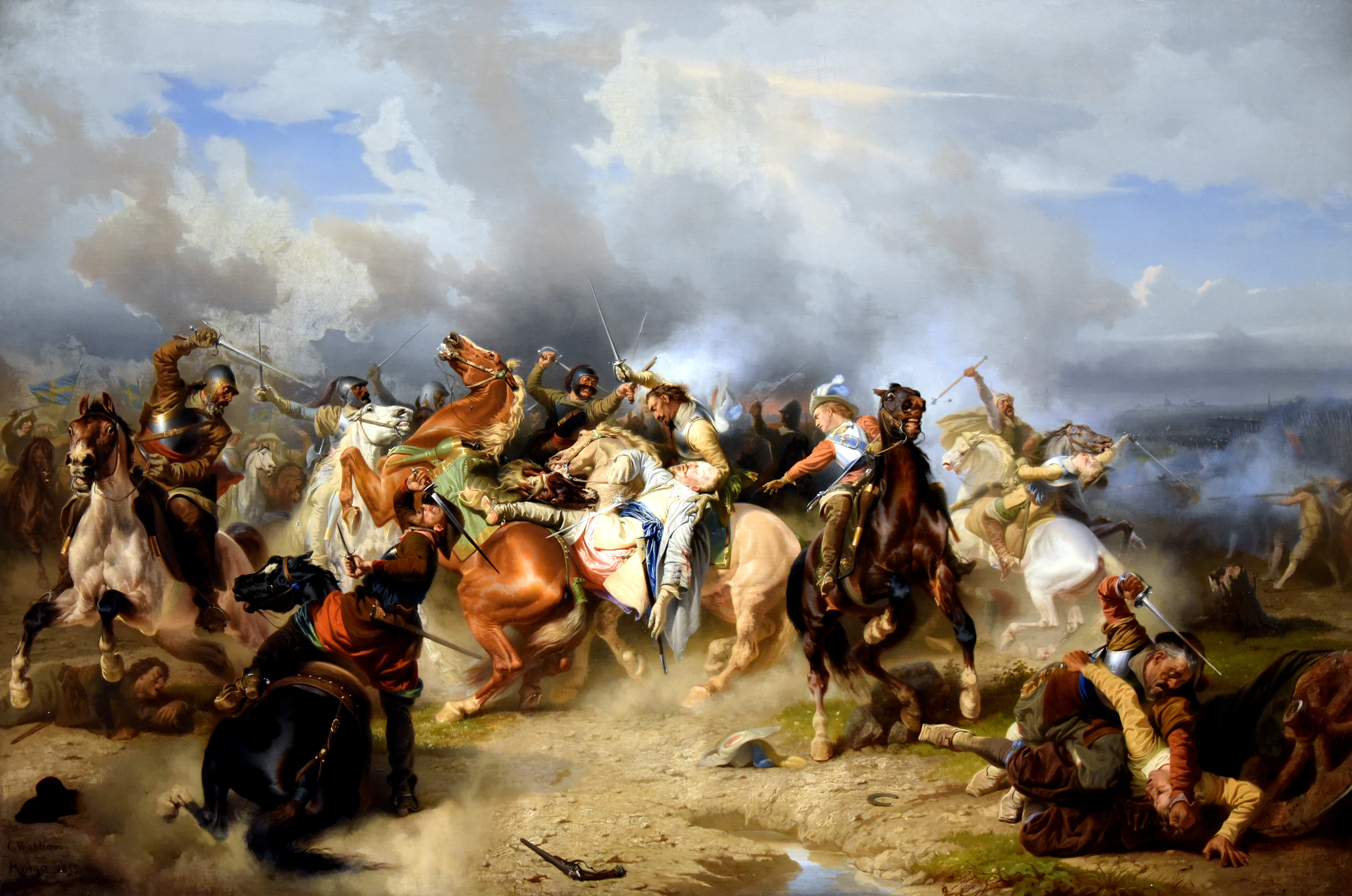
Death of King Gustav II Adolf of Sweden at the Battle of Lützen by Carl Wahlbom.

"I have enough, brother; try to save your own life." (Note: Also reported as, "I am the King of Sweden, and I seal with my blood the liberty and the religion of the whole German nation" and as "My God!")
— Gustavus Adolphus of Sweden (16 November 1632), mortally wounded at the Battle of Lützen (1632)

"I am now ready to die. Lord, forsake me not, now my strength faileth me; but grant me mercy for the merits of my Jesus. And now Lord—Lord, now receive my soul."
— George Herbert, Welsh-born poet, orator, and priest of the Church of England (1 March 1633)

"Thy kingdom come, thy will be done."
— Edward Coke, English barrister, judge and politician (3 September 1634) (Note: Year of death incorrectly given by Marvin as 1633.)

"All right then, I'll say it. Dante makes me sick." (Note: Also reported as, "True glory is in virtue. Ah, I would willingly give all the applause I have received to have performed one good action more.")
— Lope de Vega, Spanish playwright (27 August 1635)

"I have kept the faith once given to the saints; for the which cause I have also suffered these things; but I am not ashamed, for I know whom I have believed, and I am persuaded that He is able to keep that which I have committed to Him against that day." (Note: Also reported as, "Be of good cheer, be of good cheer; whether we live or die we are the Lord's.")
— William Bedell, Anglican Lord Bishop of Kilmore (7 February 1642), dying from exposure after being imprisoned and tortured by rebels
"Absolutely, and I pray God to condemn me, if I have had any other aim than the welfare of God and the state."
— Cardinal Richelieu, French clergyman and statesman (4 December 1642), when asked whether he pardoned his enemies

"O Lord, save my country! O Lord, be merciful to—"
— John Hampden, English landowner and politician (24 June 1643), mortally wounded at the Battle of Chalgrove Field six days before his death

"It has been seventeen years since I ascended the throne. I, feeble and of small virtue, have offended against Heaven; the rebels have seized my capital because my ministers deceived me. Ashamed to face my ancestors, I die. Removing my imperial cap and with my hair disheveled about my face, I leave to the rebels the dismemberment of my body. Let them not harm my people!"
("朕自登基十七年，虽朕薄德匪躬，上干天怒，然皆诸臣误朕，致逆贼直逼京师。朕死，无面目见祖宗于地下，自去冠冕，以发覆面。任贼分裂朕尸，勿伤百姓一人。")
— Chongzhen Emperor, the last emperor of Ming dynasty (24 April 1644)

"Lord, receive my soul."
— William Laud, Archbishop of Canterbury (10 January 1645), spoken as the signal to the executioner at his beheading for treason

"Be serious." (Note: Also reported as, "I have lived my life in a laborious doing of nothing" and as "I heard your voice; but did not understand what you said" (to Quistorpius, a clergyman who had said a prayer in German).)
— Hugo Grotius, Dutch humanist, diplomat, lawyer, theologian and writer (28 August 1645)

"Ungrateful traitors!"
— Masaniello, Italian fisherman and revolutionary leader (16 July 1647), to his assassins (Note: Year of death incorrectly given by Marvin as 1646.)

"Ay! but I have been nearer to you, my friends, many a time, and you have missed me."
— George Lisle, Royalist leader in the English Civil War (28 August 1648), when the officer in charge of his firing squad said they would hit him

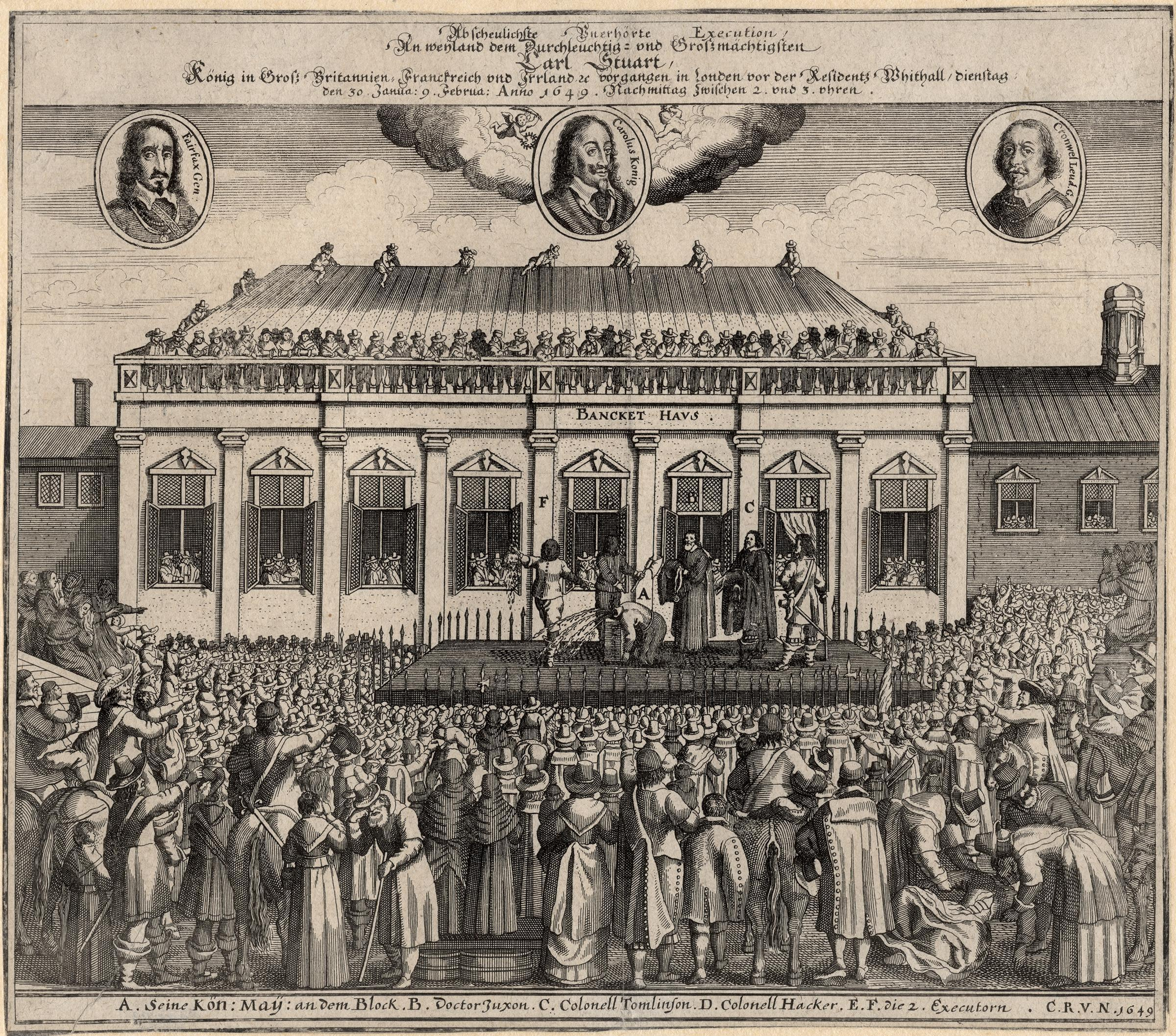
Execution of Charles I.

"Stay for the sign." (Note: Also reported as, "Remember!" (to William Juxon, Bishop of London) and as "I fear not death; death is not terrible to me.")
— Charles I of England (30 January 1649), asking for his executioner to await his signal before beheading him

"The covenant which I took, I own it and adhere to it. Bishops, I do not care for them. I never intended to advance their interests."
— James Graham, 1st Marquess of Montrose (21 May 1650), prior to execution by hanging, beheading and quartering

"Lord Jesus, receive me!"
— Eusebius Andrews, English royalist (22 August 1650), prior to execution by beheading for treason

"How sweet it is to rest!"
— John Taylor, English poet (December 1653) (Note: Year of death incorrectly given by Marvin as 1654.)

"You see what is man's life."
— Pierre Gassendi, French philosopher, Catholic priest, astronomer and mathematician (24 October 1655)

"O Lord, forgive me specially my sins of omission." (Note: Also reported as, "Lord, forgive my sins; especially my sins of omission" and as "God be merciful to me, a sinner.")
— James Ussher, Church of Ireland Archbishop of Armagh and Primate of All Ireland (21 March 1656)

"It is not my design to drink or to sleep, but my design is to make what haste I can to be gone." (Note: Also reported as, "My desire is to make what haste I may to be gone.")
— Oliver Cromwell, English general and statesman, Lord Protector (3 September 1658)

"Ah! mes enfans, you cannot cry as much for me as I have made you laugh in my time! I never thought that it was so easy a matter to laugh at the approach of death."
— Paul Scarron, French poet, dramatist and novelist (6 October 1660)

"O, my poor soul, what is to become of thee? Whither wilt thou go?"
— Cardinal Mazarin, Italian cardinal, diplomat and politician (9 March 1661)

"I bless the Lord that he gave me counsel."
— Samuel Rutherford, Scottish pastor (29 March 1661)

"I die not only a Protestant, but with a heart-hatred of popery, prelacy, and all superstition. Lord Jesus, receive me into Thy glory."
— Archibald Campbell, 1st Marquess of Argyll, Scottish nobleman (27 May 1661), before execution by beheading

"I take God to record upon my soul that I would not exchange this scaffold with the palace or mitre of the greatest prelate in Britain. The covenants, the covenants shall yet be Scotland's reviving."
— James Guthrie, Scottish Presbyterian minister (1 June 1661), prior to execution by hanging for high treason

"Jesus, oh Jesus, you are my God, my justice, my strength, my all." (Note: Also reported as, "How human you are still!" (to her weeping nuns).)
— Marie Angélique Arnauld, Abbess of the Abbey of Port-Royal (6 August 1661)

"It is a bad cause which cannot bear the words of a dying man." (Note: Also reported as, "Blessed be God, I have kept a conscience void of offence to this day, and have not deserted the righteous cause for which I suffer.")
— Henry Vane the Younger, English politician, statesman and colonial governor (14 June 1662), prior to execution by beheading for treason

"My God, forsake me not." (Note: Also reported/translated as, "May God never forsake me!")
— Blaise Pascal, French mathematician, physicist and theologian (19 August 1662)

"My heart is fixed, O God! my heart is fixed where true joy is to be found."
— Robert Sanderson, English theologian and casuist (29 January 1663)

"Abba, Father, accept this, Thy poor sinful servant, coming unto Thee through the merits of Jesus Christ. O pray, pray! praise, praise!"
— Archibald Johnston, Scottish judge and statesman (22 July 1663), before execution by hanging

"Monsieur de Montaigu, consider what I owe to God, the favor He has shown me, and the great indulgence for which I am beholden to Him. Observe how they are swelled; time to depart."
— Anne of Austria, former Queen of France (20 January 1666), looking at her formerly beautiful hands

"And now I begin my intercourse with God, which shall never be broken off. Farewell, father and mother, friends and relations; farewell, the world and all delights; farewell, sun, moon and stars! Welcome, God and Father; welcome, sweet Jesus Christ, the mediator of the new covenant; welcome, blessed Spirit of grace, the God of all consolation; welcome, glory; welcome, eternal life; and welcome, death."
— Hugh Mackail, Scottish martyr (22 December 1666), prior to execution by hanging

"My trust is in God."
— Jeremy Taylor, Anglican divine (13 August 1667)

"Vex me not with this thing, but give me a simple cross, that I may adore it, both as it is in itself and as I can figure it in my mind."
— Alonso Cano, Spanish painter, architect and sculptor (3 September 1667), asking a priest to take away a badly carved crucifix

"I shall have to ask leave to desist, when I am interrupted by so great an experiment as dying."
— William Davenant, English poet and playwright (7 April 1668), setting aside the manuscript of a new poem

"Far from well, yet far better than mine iniquities deserve."
— Richard Mather, Puritan minister (22 April 1669), when asked about his health

"Lord!"
— John Cosin, English churchman (15 January 1672), raising his hand

"Well, my friend, what news from the Great Mogul?"
— François de La Mothe Le Vayer, French writer (9 May 1672), to physician and traveler François Bernier, who had come to say goodbye to him

"Bad, bad! To judge by what I now endure, the hand of death grasps me sharply."
— Salvator Rosa, Italian artist and poet (15 March 1673), when asked how he was

"Death is the great key that opens the palace of Eternity."
— John Milton, English poet and intellectual (8 November 1674)

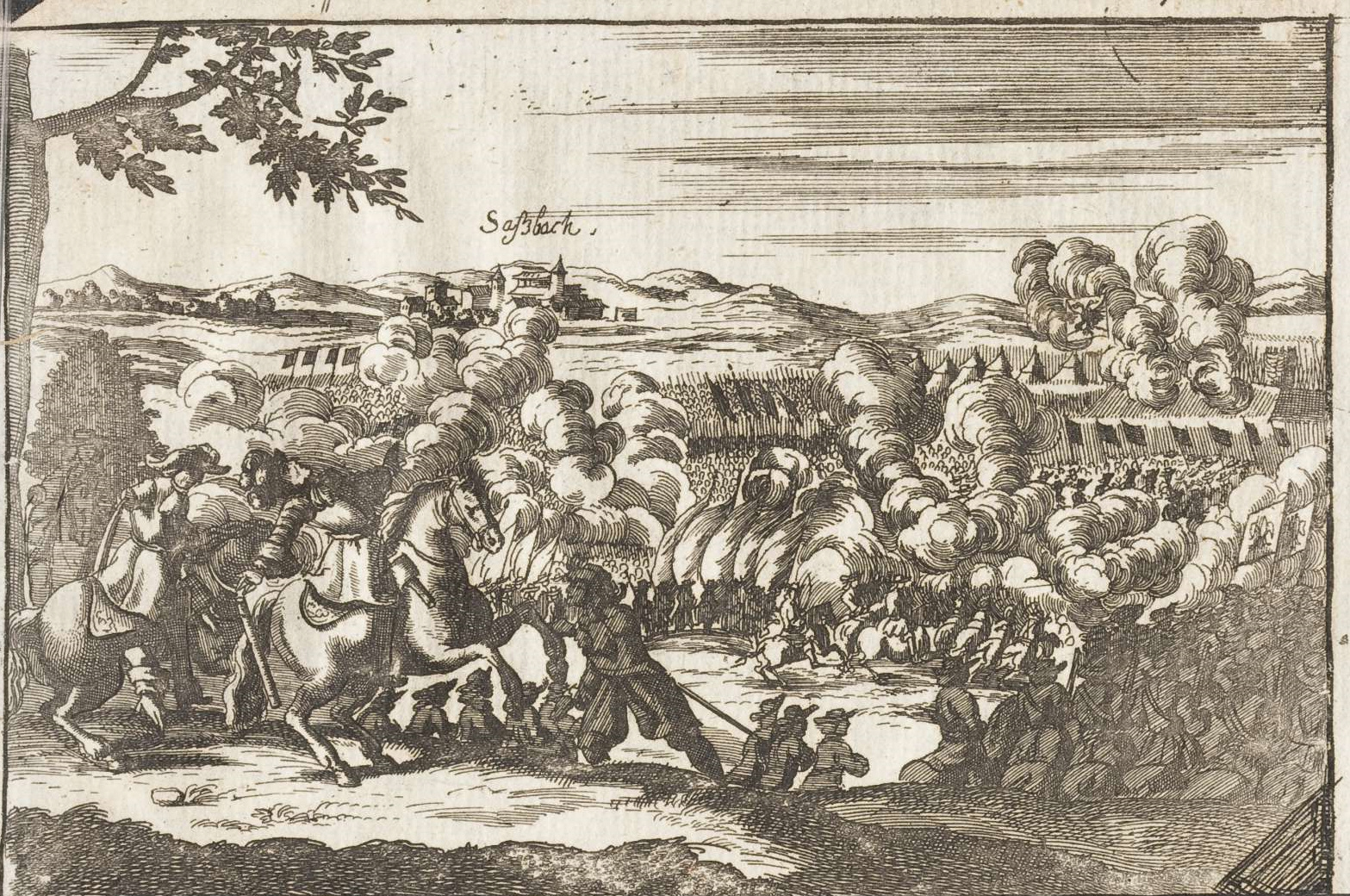
Death of the Viscount of Turenne.

"I did not mean to be killed today."
("Je ne veux point être tué aujourd'hui.")
— Henri de La Tour d'Auvergne, Viscount of Turenne (27 July 1675), struck by a cannonball at the Battle of Salzbach

"I would never have married had I known that my time would be so brief. If I had known that, I would not have taken upon myself double tears."
— Alexis of Russia, Russian Tsar (8 February [O.S. 29 January] 1676)

"I have seen the glories of the world."
— Isaac Barrow, English Christian theologian and mathematician (4 May 1677)

"Well, ladies, if I were one hour in heaven, I would not be again with you, as much as I love you."
— Mary Rich, Countess of Warwick (12 April 1678)

"How beautiful!"
— Giovan Battista Nani, Venetian ambassador, librarian and historian (5 November 1678)

"I shall be happy."
— James Sharp, Archbishop of St Andrews (3 May 1679)

"Now I am about to take my last voyage, a great leap in the dark." (Note: Also reported as, "I am taking a fearful leap in the dark"and as "If I had the whole world, I would give it to live one day. I shall be glad to find a hole to creep out the world at. About to take a leap into the dark!")
— Thomas Hobbes, English philosopher (4 December 1679)

"The only objection against the Bible is a bad life."
— John Wilmot, 2nd Earl of Rochester, English poet and courtier (26 July 1680)

"I do not fear death."
— Thomas Blood, Anglo-Irish officer and desperado (24 August 1680)

"I do forgive you."
— William Howard, 1st Viscount Stafford (29 December 1680), to his executioner prior to beheading for alleged treason

"Now the bitterness of death is past."
— William Russell, Lord Russell (21 July 1683), after bidding farewell to his wife prior to execution by beheading for treason

"Stop. Change that to say, 'I am yet in the land of the dying, but I hope soon to be in the land of the living.'" (Note: Also reported as, "I am glad to hear it; but, O brother Payne! the long-wished-for day is come at last, in which I shall see that glory in another manner than I have ever done, or was capable of doing, in this world" (to Rev. William Payne, who had informed him that his Meditations on the Glory of Christ was on the press).)
— John Owen, English Nonconformist church leader and theologian (24 August 1683), when his secretary had written "I am still in the land of the living" in a letter in his name

"I know that my Redeemer liveth. I die for the good old cause."
— Algernon Sidney, English politician (7 December 1683), prior to execution by beheading for treason

"My God, my Father, and my Friend, / Do not forsake me in the end."
— Wentworth Dillon, 4th Earl of Roscommon, Anglo-Irish landlord, Irish peer, and poet (18 January 1685), quoting from his own translation of the "Dies irae"

"I have been a most unconscionable time dying, but I beg you to excuse it." (Note: Also reported as, "Don't forget poor Nell" or "Don't let poor Nellie starve.")
— Charles II of England (6 February 1685)

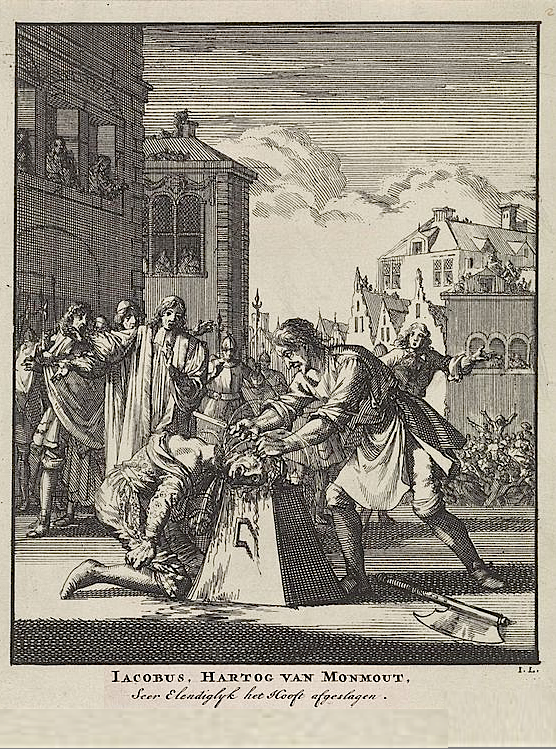
Execution of James Scott, 1st Duke of Monmouth (etching by (Jan Luyken).

"There are six guineas for you, and do not hack me as you did my Lord Russell. I have heard that you struck him three or four times. My servant will give you more gold if you do your work well."
— James Scott, 1st Duke of Monmouth, illegitimate son of Charles II of England (15 July 1685), to Jack Ketch, his executioner. Ketch was nervous and took several blows to behead Scott.

"Lord, into Thy hands I commend my spirit; for Thou hast redeemed me, Lord God of truth."
— James Renwick, Scottish minister (17 February 1688), before execution by hanging

"Take me, for I come to Thee."
— John Bunyan, English writer and preacher (31 August 1688)

"O, come in glory! I have long waited for Thy coming. Let no dark cloud rest on the work of the Indians. Let it live when I am dead. Welcome joy!"
— John Eliot, Puritan missionary to the American Indians, founder of Roxbury Latin School (21 May 1690)

"I need nothing but God, and to lose myself in the heart of Jesus."
— Margaret Mary Alacoque, French Roman Catholic nun, promoter of devotion to the Sacred Heart of Jesus (17 October 1690)

"Never heed; the Lord's power is over all weakness and death."
— George Fox, English Dissenter, founder of the Religious Society of Friends (13 January 1691)

"I know that it will be well with me."
— John Flavel, English Presbyterian clergyman and author (26 June 1691)

"Death, death. O I thank Him, I thank Him. The Lord teach you to die." (Note: Also reported as, "I have pain—there is no arguing against sense—but I have peace, I have peace! I am almost well.")
— Richard Baxter, English Puritan church leader, poet, hymnodist and theologian (8 December 1691)

"Nectare clausa suo, / Dignum tantorum pretium tulit illa laborum."
— Louise-Anastasia Serment, French natural philosopher and poet (1692). Quoting the Latin inscription on a Roman piece of amber trapping a bee; 'closed in her nectar, she receives the reward for all her labours'.

"You are a lyer; I am no more a Witch than you are a Wizard, and if you take away my Life, God will give you Blood to drink."
— Sarah Good, American woman accused of witchcraft during the Salem witch trials (29 July [O.S. 19 July] 1692), to Reverend Nicholas Noyes prior to execution by hanging (Note: These last words are legendary and unconfirmed. Noyes is also traditionally supposed to have died by choking on his own blood 25 years later.)

"More weight." (Note: Also reported as, "More rocks" and "Damn you. I curse you and Salem!")
— Giles Corey, English-born American farmer (19 September 1692), before being pressed to death during the Salem witch trials

"Yes, like that, just like that, my royal friend, raise me upward, upward!"
("Ja, så, just så, min kunglige vän, res mig uppåt, uppåt!")
— Ulrica Eleanor the Elder, Queen of Sweden (26 July 1693) to her husband holding her

"Oh, that this were for Ireland."
— Patrick Sarsfield, 1st Earl of Lucan, Irish soldier (21 August 1693), mortally wounded at the Battle of Landen

"Bring me wine."
— Suleiman I of Persia, Shah of Safavid Iran (29 July 1694), According to the French cleric, Martin Gaudereau.

ftal"My Lord, why do you not go on? I am not afraid to die."
— Mary II of England (28 December 1694), when the clergyman reading the prayers for the sick paused due to being overcome by grief (Note: Marvin states that this clergyman was John Tillotson, Archbishop of Canterbury, who died on 22 November 1694, over a month before Mary. Thomas Tenison, his successor, attended Mary during her last illness.)

"O death, where is thy—"
— Philip Henry, English Nonconformist clergyman and diarist (24 June 1696), quoting 1 Corinthians 15:55

"Debt!"
— Hortense Mancini, Duchesse de Mazarin, niece of Cardinal Mazarin and mistress of Charles II of England (2 July 1699), dying in financial ruin (Note: Marvin incorrectly describes Mancini as Cardinal Mazarin's sister rather than his niece.)

"I am nothing."
— Charles II of Spain (1 November 1700)

== Ironic last words ==
"Although dealing with the Japanese and the barbarians is not something that should be taken lightly, I fear that as peace is ingrained in you, the days growing longer, all matters might be done lazily and slowly, so you should always be careful and watch out every day, so you do not give in to negligence."
— Sejong the Great, king of the Joseon Dynasty (30 March 1450). Korea would later be invaded and pillaged by the Japanese, and later, subjugated by the Manchus, who the Koreans considered 'barbarians'.
"I feel sleepy, and a moment of rest would do me good."
— Gustav III, King of Sweden (29 March 1792) 13 days after being shot in the back at a masquerade.
"Thomas Jefferson survives."
— John Adams, Founding Father and second president of the United States (4 July 1826), unaware that Jefferson had died earlier that same day.
"We have now got through all danger – keep up good heart, and when we get to Fort King, I'll give you three days for Christmas."
— Francis L. Dade, United States Army major (28 December 1835), addressing his troops just before being shot and killed in a Seminole ambush which resulted in his unit's destruction.
"A bullet has not yet been molded that will kill me."
— Martin E. Green, Confederate Brigadier General at the Siege of Vicksburg, seconds before being fatally shot.
"They couldn't hit an elephant at this distance..."
— General John Sedgwick (9 May 1864) at the Battle of Spotsylvania Court House shortly before being shot and killed by enemy fire.
"Sergeant, the Spanish bullet isn't made that will kill me."
— Captain Buckey O'Neill (1 July 1898), one of Theodore Roosevelt's Rough Riders, just before being shot in the mouth prior to charge up Kettle Hill.
"I think I'm going to make it."
— Richard A. Loeb (28 January 1936), after being slashed 56 times with a razor in a prison fight.
"I'll show you that it won't shoot."
— Johnny Ace (25 December 1954), American musician, playing with a .32 caliber revolver.
"No, you certainly can't." (Note: Also reported as, "That's obvious" and "My God, I've been hit.")
— John F. Kennedy, 35th president of the United States (22 November 1963), replying to co-passenger Nellie Connally saying, "You certainly can't say Dallas doesn't love you, Mr. President" while traveling through Dallas in a motorcade, shortly before he was assassinated by Lee Harvey Oswald.
"I know this beach like the back of my hand."
— Harold Holt, 17th Prime Minister of Australia (17 December 1967); he would subsequently disappear while swimming at Cheviot Beach, Victoria.
"What do you think I'm gonna do? Blow my brains out?"
— Terry Kath (23 January 1978), of the band Chicago, before putting what he thought was an unloaded pistol to his temple and pulling the trigger.
"Do you really think the IRA would think me a worthwhile target?"
— Louis Mountbatten, 1st Earl Mountbatten of Burma, British Royal Navy officer and statesman (27 August 1979), prior to death in IRA bombing of his fishing boat.
"I've got to be crazy to do this shot. I should've asked for a double."
— Vic Morrow, American actor (23 July 1982), prior to being killed along with two child actors during the filming of Twilight Zone: The Movie.
"I feel great."
— Pete Maravich, American basketball player (5 January 1988), before dying of an undiagnosed heart defect during a pickup game in Pasadena, California.
"I told u I was hardcore [...] u are so fucking stupid"
— Brandon Vedas (12 January 2003), American computer enthusiast talking on Internet Relay Chat (IRC) during a drug overdose that ultimately killed him.
"Leave me alone, I'm fine."
— Barry White, American singer and songwriter (4 July 2003), to a nurse
"I'd like to thank the Academy for my lifetime achievement award that I will eventually get."
— Donald O'Connor, American actor, dancer and singer (27 September 2003), spoken to his family at his bedside. As of 2026, he has yet to posthumously receive the Academy Honorary Award.
"You're a lifesaver, Andy."
— William Donaldson, British satirist and playboy (22 June 2005), to the caretaker of his building, who had collected pills for him on which he would later overdose.
"Still hanging around."
— Jeffrey Epstein, American financier and child sex offender, last message sent to journalist Michael Wolff (10 August 2019) before his death by hanging in an alleged suicide.
"Well, I've got to be alive for it, haven't I?"
— Prince Philip, Duke of Edinburgh and Prince Consort to Elizabeth II (9 April 2021), talking to his son, then Prince of Wales, Prince Charles, about Philip's upcoming 100th birthday, which would have taken place two months and one day after his death.
"Even if you escape the torment of history, you will not be able to escape the wrath of Allah."
— Hasan Bitmez, Turkish MP (12 December 2023), after calling on the wrath of God on the State of Israel in the Grand National Assembly of Turkey before collapsing due to a heart attack. He would die two days later.

== Independently notable last words ==
This section is for last words that pass Wikipedia's notability guidelines and have therefore warranted their own article.

"Do not disturb my circles!" (Μή μου τοὺς κύκλους τάραττε!)
— Archimedes, Greek mathematician (c. 212 BC), to a Roman soldier who interrupted his geometric experiments during the capture of Syracuse, whereupon the soldier killed him
"You too, my child?" (Note: It is a common misconception that Caesar's last words were Et tu, Brute?, meaning 'And you, Brutus?'. However, this is a misattribution originating from the play Julius Caesar by William Shakespeare.) (Καὶ σὺ, τέκνον;)
— Julius Caesar, Roman dictator (15 March 44 BC), discovering that his stepson Brutus was among his murderers.

"It is finished." (Note: Only the Gospel of John specifies the words Jesus said during his final utterance, though both the Gospel of Matthew and Gospel of Mark mention him making some sort of vocalization between drinking the beverage and dying. In contrast, the Gospel of Luke's narrative inserts a longer conversation between his fellow condemned that instead ends with Jesus quoting Psalm 31:5: "Father, into thy hands I commit my spirit," a quote not found in any of the other three gospels. For more information, see sayings of Jesus on the cross. Further note that Jesus also has last words attributed to him after his resurrection and before his ascension.)) (τετέλεσται.)
— Jesus, founder of Christianity (c. 33 AD), right before his death by crucifixion.
"Never mind, it is good to die for our country." (Note: According to Aviel Roshwald, the authenticity of Trumpeldor's final utterance is well-attested and not questioned by historians despite a widespread belief that they are apocryphal.) ("אין דבר, טוב למות בעד ארצנו")
— Joseph Trumpeldor, Jewish Zionist activist (1 March 1920), after being mortally wounded at the Battle of Tel Hai.
"Death to fascism! Freedom to the people!" (Smrt fašizmu, sloboda narodu!)
— Stjepan Filipović, Yugoslav communist (22 May 1942), seconds before execution by hanging.
"Are you guys ready? Let's roll."
— Todd Beamer, American passenger on United Airlines Flight 93 (11 September 2001), signaling the start of the revolt against the flight's hijackers, resulting in the plane crashing in the ensuing struggle for the controls, killing all 44 aboard.
"I can't breathe."
— Eric Garner, American former horticulturist (17 July 2014), after being put in a chokehold by an arresting NYPD shortly before losing consciousness and dying.

== See also ==
- Last words, about the actual final utterings of dying patients
- Black comedy
- Lists of unusual deaths
- Death poem
- Last meal
