= List of last words (19th century) =

List of last words
18th century	19th century	20th century	21st century

The following is a list of last words uttered by notable individuals during the 19th century (1801–1900). A typical entry will report information in the following order:

- Last word(s), name and short description, date of death, circumstances around their death (if applicable), and a reference.

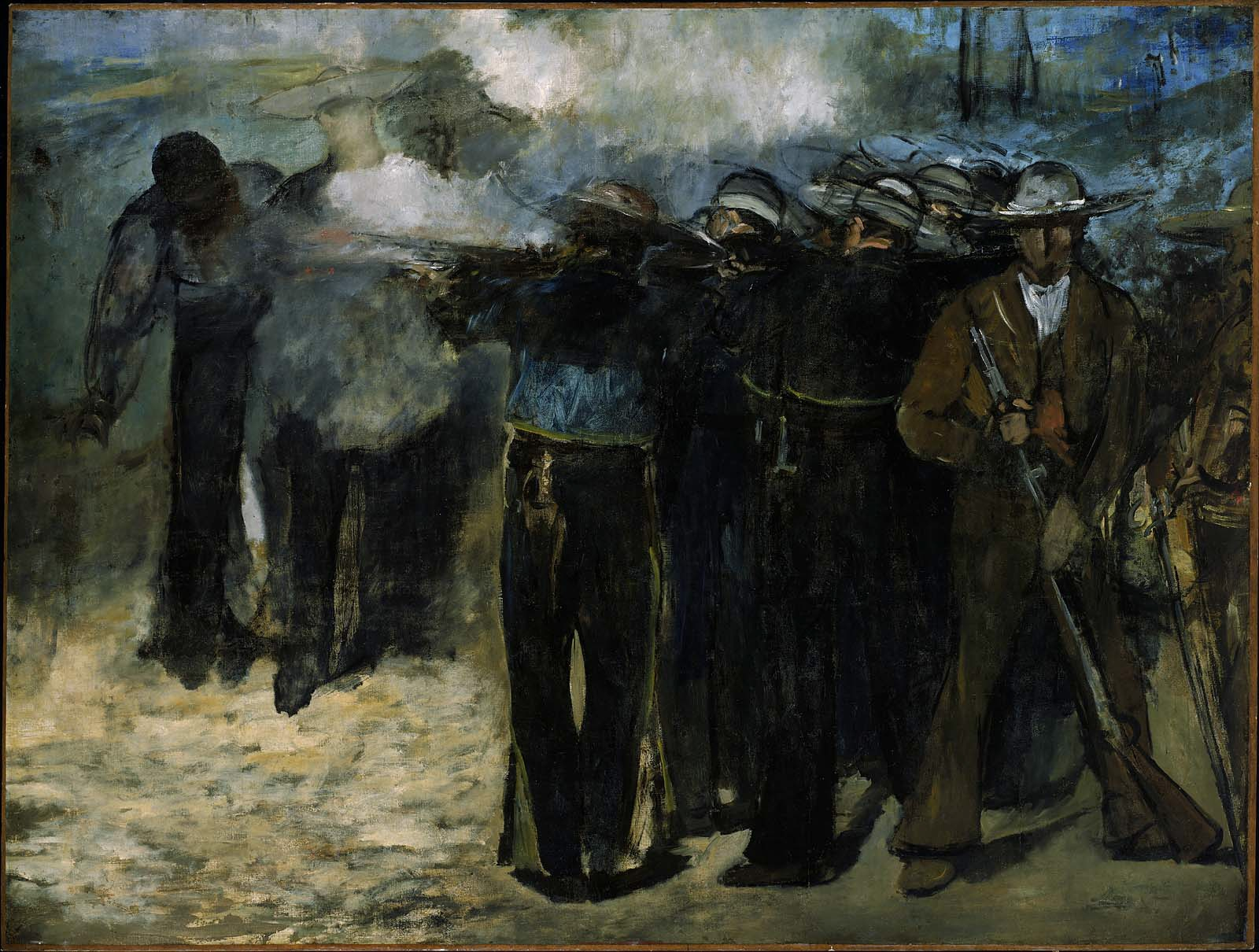
The last words of Maximilian I of Mexico may or may not have referred to his wife.

== 1801–1809 ==
"Only a soldier's blanket! Make haste and return it to him at once."
— Ralph Abercromby, Scottish soldier and politician (28 March 1801). Wounded at the Battle of Alexandria, he asked what had been placed under his head and was told it was "Only a soldier's blanket." (Note: Brahms mistakenly names the occasion of Abercromby's mortal wound as the Battle of Aboukir Bay rather than the Battle of Alexandria.)

"Let me die in the old uniform in which I fought my battles for freedom. May God forgive me for putting on any other." (Note: Also reported as, "Let me die in this old uniform in which I fought my battles. May God forgive me for ever having put on another.")
— Benedict Arnold, American military officer and traitor (14 June 1801), referring to his Continental Army uniform

"Emma, will you? There is no time to be lost."
— Erasmus Darwin, English physician and natural philosopher (18 April 1802), urging his daughter to bleed him

"Stop, go out of the room; I am about to die."
— George Fordyce, Scottish physician (25 May 1802), to his daughter, who had been reading to him

"Doctor, if I could be the man I was when I was 21 years of age, I would be willing to be stripped stark naked on the top of the Alleghany Mountains to run for my life with the hounds of hell at my heels."
— Daniel Morgan, American pioneer, soldier and politician (6 July 1802), when his physician advised him to settle his affairs

"Ah! The times were good! It was I who was so unhappy."
("Ah! c'était le bon temps! J'étais si malheureuse.")
— Sophie Arnould, French operatic soprano (18 October 1802), when a priest asked how much she had suffered

"I am grateful to Divine Mercy for having left me sufficient recollection to feel how consoling these prayers are to the dying."
— Jean-François de La Harpe, French playwright, writer and literary critic (11 February 1803); his final recorded words, spoken the day before his death

"Not yet. Not yet. Not—"
— Robert Emmet, Irish Republican and Irish nationalist patriot, orator and rebel leader (20 September 1803), during execution by hanging for treason. The executioner carried out the hanging in the middle of Emmet's attempt to say "Not yet" for the third time.

"Clasp my hand, my dear friend, I die!"
("Stringetemi la mano, mia cara, mi sento morire.")
— Vittorio Alfieri, Italian dramatist and poet (8 October 1803), to Princess Louise of Stolberg-Gedern

"Refresh me with a great thought."
— Johann Gottfried Herder, German philosopher, theologian, poet and literary critic (18 December 1803)

"My anchor is well cast, and my ship, though weather-beaten, will outride the storm."
— Samuel Hopkins, American Congregationalist theologian and abolitionist (20 December 1803)

"That is right; I have now done." (Note: Also reported as, "I am going to sleep like you, but we shall all wake together, and I trust to lasting happiness" (to his grandchildren and attendants).)
— Joseph Priestley, English chemist, natural philosopher and theologian (6 February 1804), while dictating revisions to his works

"I have not yet lost my feeling for humanity." (Note: Also reported as, "God forbid that I should be sunk so low as to forget the offices of humanity.")
— Immanuel Kant, German philosopher (12 February 1804), thanking his physicians and attendants

"I die for my king and for France." (Note: Also reported as, "I must die then at the hands of Frenchmen!" and as "Grenadiers! lower your arms, otherwise you will miss me or only wound me" (to his firing squad).)
— Louis Antoine, Duke of Enghien (21 March 1804), prior to execution by firing squad

"Remember, my Eliza, you are a Christian.

Alexander's other final words were "If they break this Union, They will break my heart" (as per Ron Chernow's biography on Alexander Hamilton) " (Note: Also reported as, "This is a mortal wound, doctor" and as "God be merciful to ———–")

— Alexander Hamilton, American statesman (12 July 1804), addressing his wife after being mortally shot by his rival Aaron Burr in a duel

"I shall not live more than two days, therefore make haste."
— William Woodville, English physician and botanist (26 March 1805), to a carpenter he had summoned to measure him for his coffin; final recorded words

"Many things are growing clearer and clearer to me." (Note: Also reported as, "Calmer and calmer" (when asked how he felt).)
— Friedrich Schiller, German writer, philosopher and physician (9 May 1805)

"Taught, half by reason, half by mere decay, / To welcome death, and calmly pass away."
— Arthur Murphy, Irish writer (18 June 1805), quoting Alexander Pope

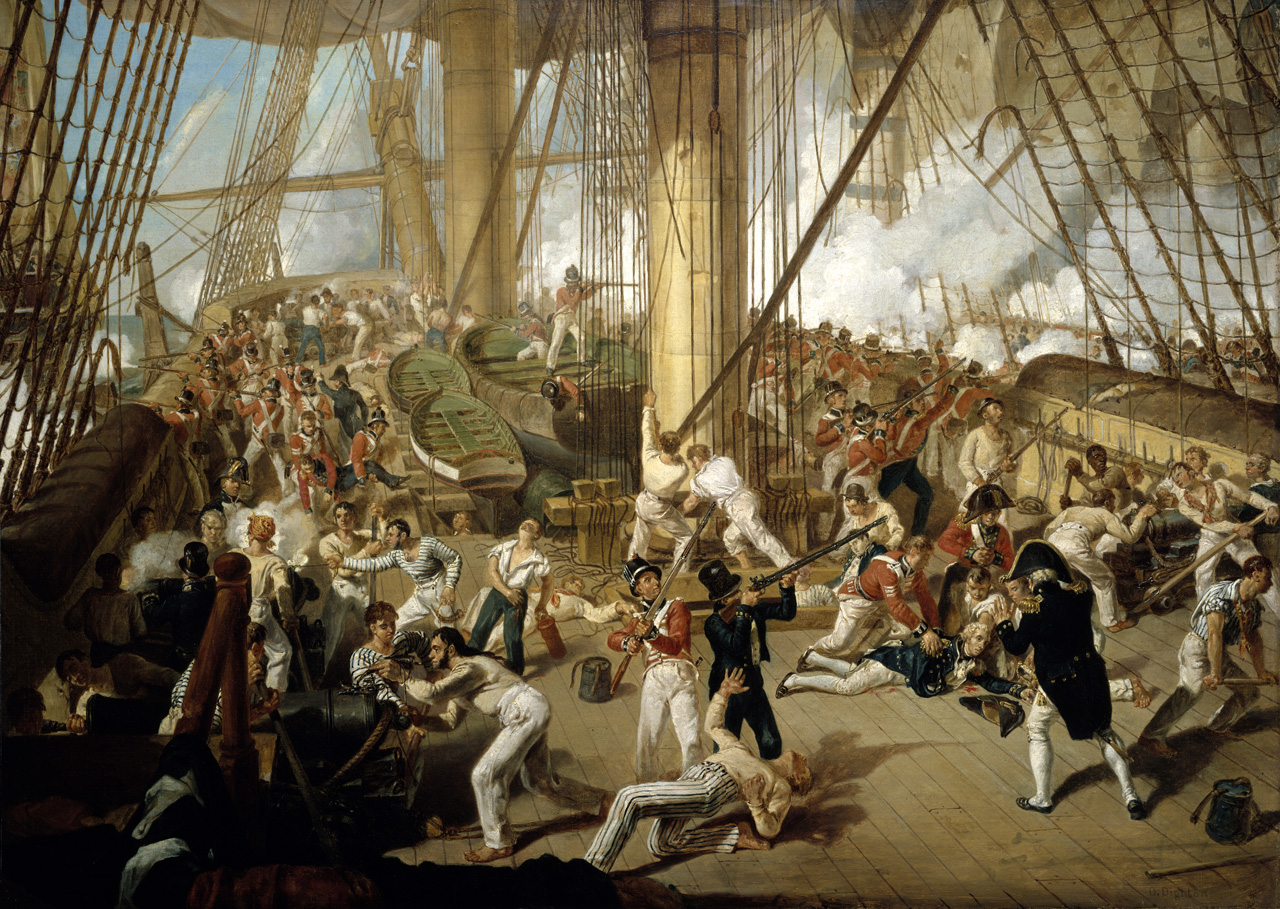
Nelson is shot on the quarterdeck, painted by Denis Dighton, c. 1825.

"Thank God, I have done my duty." (Note: Also reported as, "And take care of my dear Lady Hamilton, Hardy. Take care of poor Lady Hamilton. Kiss me, Hardy.... Remember that I leave lady Hamilton and my daughter, Horatia, as a legacy to my country – and never forget Horatia", as "Tell Collingwood to bring the fleet to anchor", and as "Drink, drink. Fan, fan. Rub, rub.")
— Horatio Nelson, 1st Viscount Nelson, Royal Navy admiral (21 October 1805), mortally wounded at the Battle of Trafalgar

"I think I could eat one of Bellamy's veal pies." (Note: Also reported as "Oh, my country! how I leave my country!", "Oh, my country, how I love my country" and "Alas, my country!")
— William Pitt the Younger, Prime Minister of the United Kingdom (23 January 1806)

"I'll be shot if I don't believe I'm dying."
— Edward Thurlow, 1st Baron Thurlow, British lawyer and politician (12 September 1806)

"I die happy." (Note: Also reported as, "Trotter will tell you" (words of unclear meaning addressed to his wife. Elizabeth Armistead).)
— Charles James Fox, British statesman (13 September 1806)

"Have pity on the poor Indians; if you can get any influence with the great, endeavor to do them all the good you can."
— Joseph Brant, Mohawk military and political leader (24 November 1807), to his adopted nephew John Norton

"I am satisfied with the Lord's will."
— John Newton, English Anglican cleric and abolitionist, author of "Amazing Grace" (21 December 1807); final recorded words

"I am all yours."
("Je suis toute à vous.")
— Adrienne de La Fayette (24 December 1807), French marchioness who married Marquis de Lafayette

"I have peace of mind. It may arise from stupidity, but I think it is founded on a belief of the Gospel. My hope is in the mercy of God through Jesus Christ."
— Fisher Ames, member of the U.S. House of Representatives (4 July 1808)

"No, whatever is, is best."
— Theophilus Lindsey, English Unitarian theologian and clergyman (3 November 1808), to a friend who suggested that Lindsey was strengthened by the saying, "Whatever is, is right"

"It is a great satisfaction to me to know we have beaten the French. I hope the people of England will be satisfied. I hope my country will do me justice."
— John Moore, British Army general (16 January 1809), mortally wounded at the Battle of Corunna. Moore then spoke of his mother and some other people, including Lady Hester Stanhope, before dying.

"O, that glorious sun!"
— Beilby Porteus, Bishop of London and abolitionist (13 May 1809) (Note: Year of death incorrectly given by Marvin as 1808.)

"God preserve the emperor." (Note: Also reported as, "Children be comforted, I am well" (reassuring his servants when cannon shot fell near his house during the French bombardment of Vienna).)
— Joseph Haydn, Austrian composer (31 May 1809), playing his own "Emperor's Hymn"

"Taking a leap into the dark. O mystery!" (Note: Also reported as, "I would give worlds, if I had them, if The Age of Reason had never been published. Stay with me, for God's sake, for I cannot bear to be left alone! Send even a child to stay with me" and as "I have no wish to believe on that subject" (when his physician asked, "Do you wish to believe that Jesus is the Son of God?").)
— Thomas Paine, English-born American political activist and theorist, philosopher and revolutionary (8 June 1809)

"I am not coward, but I am so strong. It is hard to die."
— Meriwether Lewis, American explorer (11 October 1809), apparent suicide/possible murder

"I am dead."
("Je suis mort.")
— Antoine François, comte de Fourcroy, French chemist (16 December 1809)

"It grows dark, boys, you may go." (Note: Also reported as, "That Horace was very well said; you did not do it so well. But it grows dark, very dark—the boys may dismiss.")
— Alexander Adam, Scottish teacher (18 December 1809), imagining himself still at work

== 1810–1819 ==
"I will not kneel. Fire!" (Note: Also reported as, "I stand in the presence of my Creator, and standing I will render back my spirit to God who gave it. Fire!")
— Andreas Hofer, leader of the Tyrolean Rebellion (20 February 1810), to his firing squad

"I am a queen, but I have not the power to move my arms."
— Louise of Mecklenburg-Strelitz, Queen of Prussia (19 July 1810)

"Contemplate the state in which I am fallen, and learn to die."
— Raphaël Bienvenu Sabatier, French anatomist and surgeon (19 July 1811), to his son

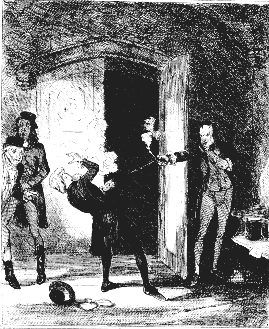
Assassination of Spencer Perceval by John Bellingham in the lobby of the House of Commons.

"Oh!" (Note: Also reported as, "Murder" and "Oh my God.")
— Spencer Perceval, Prime Minister of the United Kingdom (11 May 1812), mortally wounded by gunshot

"I thank God for having enabled me to meet my fate with so much fortitude and resignation."
— John Bellingham, English merchant, assassin of Spencer Perceval (18 May 1812), prior to hanging

"Push on the York Volunteers." (Note: Described as "Almost his last words". Also reported as, "Push on, brave York volunteers!" as "Surgite!" ("Press on!") and as "Push on, don't mind me.")
— Isaac Brock KB, British Army officer (13 October 1812), mortally wounded at the Battle of Queenston Heights

"The pains, the groans, the dying strife. How long, O Lord, how long?"
— Harriet Newell, American Christian missionary and memoirist (30 November 1812), dying in Mauritius

"Reason thus with life, / If I do lose thee, I do lose a thing / That none but fools would keep."
— John Moody, Irish actor (26 December 1812), quoting Shakespeare (Measure for Measure, Act 3, Scene 1)

"Now, why did I do that?"
— Sir William Erskine, 2nd Baronet, British Army officer and Member of Parliament (1813), after jumping from a window in Lisbon, Portugal

"I will not abandon the post which Providence has assigned me; I think it my duty not only to sacrifice my pleasure and repose, but my life, should it be necessary, for the safety of my patients."
— Benjamin Rush, American physician, signer of the United States Declaration of Independence (19 April 1813), dying of typhus

"Don't give up the ship. Fight her till she sinks." (Note: Also reported as, "Tell the men to fire faster! Don't give up the ship!", or as a combination of the two versions.)
— James Lawrence, United States naval officer (4 June 1813), mortally wounded by British fire. His words became a popular naval battle cry.

"Bury me where the birds will sing over my grave."
— Alexander Wilson, American ornithologist (23 August 1813)

"Now let her sing and clash, / That glowing sparks may flash! / Morn wakes in nuptial pride. / Hurrah, thou iron bride! / Hurrah!"
("Nun lasst das Liebchen singen, / Dass helle Funken springen! / Der Hochzeitsmorgen graut. / Hurra, du Eisenbraut! / Hurra!")
— Theodor Körner, German poet and soldier (26 August 1813); final lines of the "Schwertlied", written two hours before his death in battle

"Now I am satisfied; I die contented."
— William Ward Burrows II, United States naval officer (5 September 1813), mortally wounded while commanding USS Enterprise in the capture of HMS Boxer

"So live your life that the fear of death can never enter your heart. Trouble no one about their religion; respect others in their view, and demand that they respect yours. Love your life, perfect your life, beautify all things in your life. Seek to make your life long and its purpose in the service of your people. Prepare a noble death song for the day when you go over the great divide."
— Tecumseh, leader of the Shawnee (10 September 1813), to his son

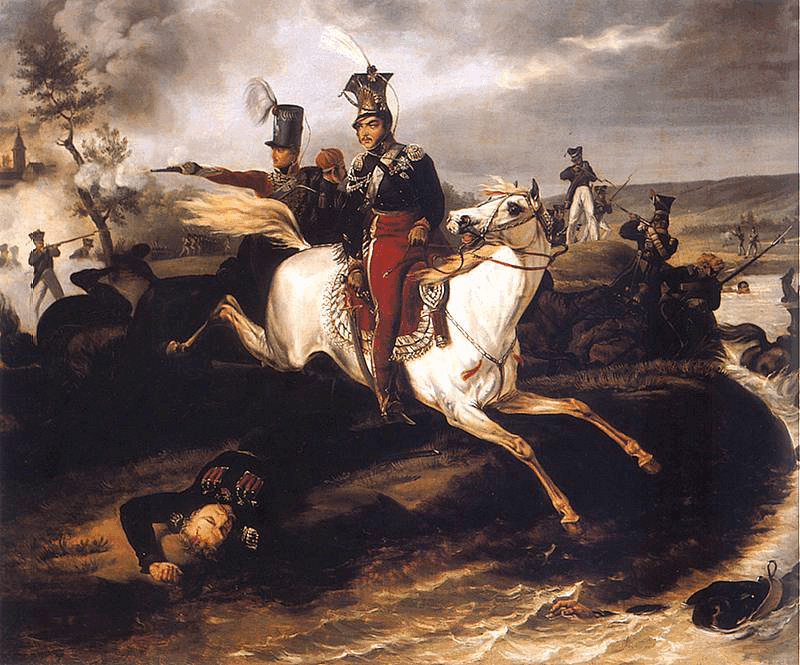
Death of Poniatowski by January Suchodolski

"Gentlemen, it behoves us now to die with honour."
— Józef Poniatowski, Polish general and Marshal of the Empire (19 October 1813). While he was covering the French Army's retreat during the Battle of Leipzig, French forces prematurely blew up the only bridge over the White Elster before Poniatowski could reach it.

"I shall not in fact see the new year which I have just commemorated."
— Johann Georg Jacobi, German poet (4 January 1814), referring to a poem for New Year's Day that he had completed on New Year's Eve; he in fact lived 5 more days

"Leave it alone; I need no medicine; I feel that I am well."
— Johann Gottlieb Fichte, German philosopher (29 January 1814), to an attendant who brought him medicine

"L'Isle d'Elbe—Napoleon—"
— Empress Joséphine, former wife of Napoleon (29 May 1814), looking at a picture of her former husband, who was exiled to the island of Elba at the time

"If I have been deceived, doubtless it was the work of a spirit; whether that spirit was good or bad, I do not know."
— Joanna Southcott, English self-described religious prophetess (27 December 1814); final recorded words

"I have no religious joys; but I have a hope, in the strength of which I think I could plunge into eternity."
— Andrew Fuller, English Particular Baptist minister and theologian (7 May 1815), to a young minister

"My dear Wachholtz, where is Olfermann?"
— Frederick William, Duke of Brunswick-Wolfenbüttel (16 May 1815), to his aide Major von Wachholtz asking for whereabouts of adjutant-general Elias Olfermann shortly after being shot in the liver at the Battle of Quatre Bras

"Charge! Hurrah! hurrah!"
— Thomas Picton, Welsh officer of the British Army (18 June 1815), before being shot in the temple at the Battle of Waterloo

"Soldiers, save my face; aim at my heart. Farewell."
— Joachim Murat, King of Naples (13 October 1815), to his firing squad

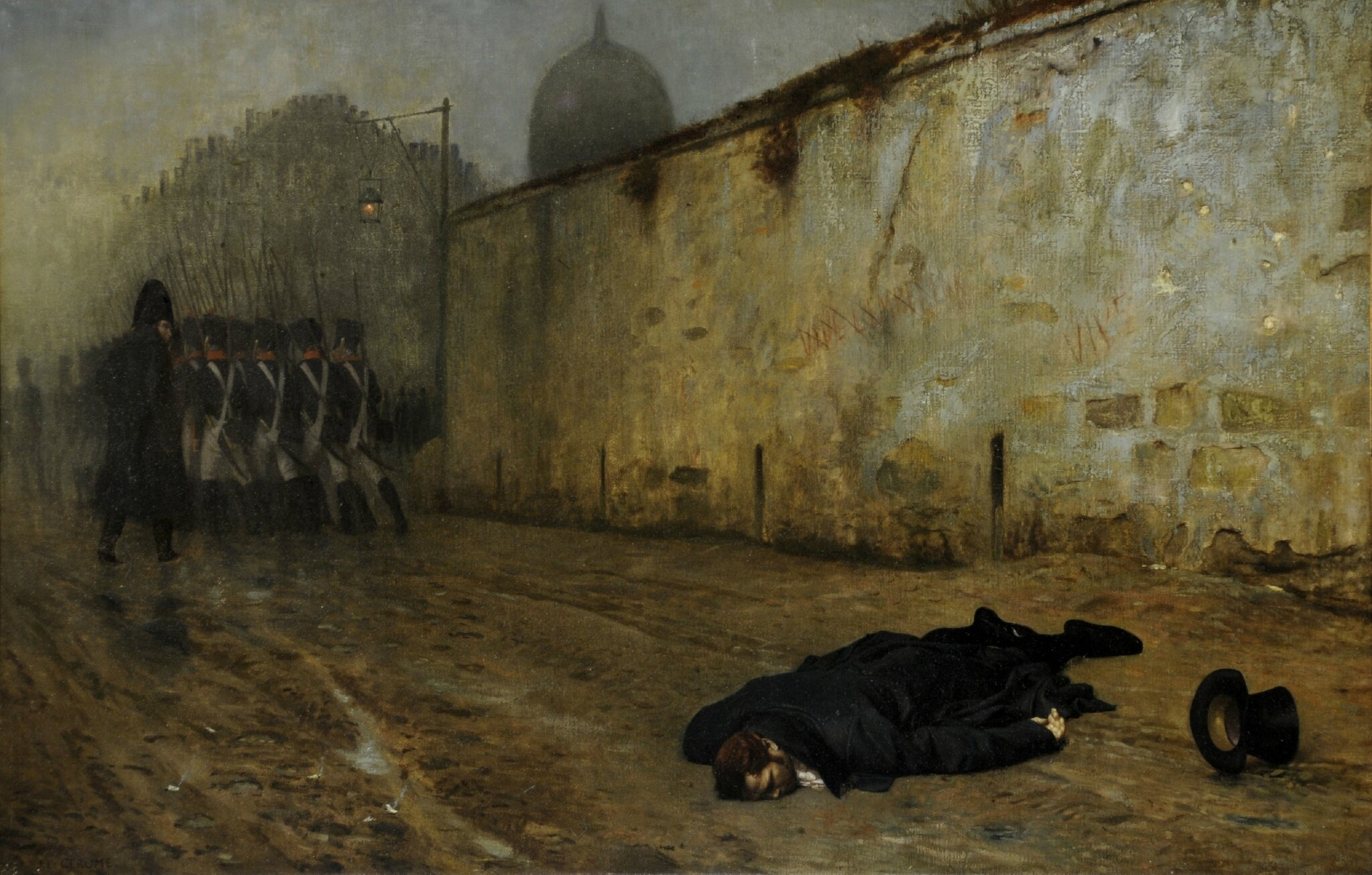
The Execution of Marshal Ney (1868), by Jean-Léon Gérôme

"Soldiers, when I give the command to fire, fire straight at my heart. Wait for the order. It will be my last to you. I protest against my condemnation. I have fought a hundred battles for France, and not one against her ... Soldiers, fire!"
— Michel Ney, Marshal of the Empire (7 December 1815). When executed by firing squad, he refused to wear a blindfold and was allowed the right to give the order to fire himself.

"I am absolutely undone." (Note: Also reported as, "Did you know Burke?")
— Richard Brinsley Sheridan, Irish satirist, playwright and poet (7 July 1816), dying in poverty

"A beautiful day, yes, but— / 'Who, to dumb forgetfulness a prey, / This pleasing, anxious being e'er resigned; / Left the warm precincts of the cheerful day, / Nor cast one longing, lingering look behind?'" (Note: Just before his death Morris also said, "Sixty-four years ago, it pleased the Almighty to call me into existence—here, on this spot, in this very room; and now shall I complain that he is pleased to call me hence?")
— Gouverneur Morris, American statesman and Founding Father of the United States (6 November 1816), quoting from Elegy Written in a Country Churchyard by Thomas Gray on being told the weather was fine

"There, I have done! Oh, what triumphant truth!"
— Timothy Dwight IV, American academic and educator (11 January 1817), finishing his final manuscript

"I have loved God, my father, and liberty." (Note: Also reported as, "Heavily, like a big peasant woman" (when asked how she was going to sleep).)
— Germaine de Staël, French woman of letters and political theorist (14 July 1817)

"I want nothing but death."
— Jane Austen, English novelist (18 July 1817), being asked by her sister Cassandra if she wanted something

"That is surprising, since I have been practicing all night."
— John Philpot Curran, Irish orator, politician and wit (14 October 1817), when his doctor said he was coughing "with more difficulty"

"An end of Poland."
— Tadeusz Kościuszko, Polish-Lithuanian military engineer, statesman, and military leader (15 October 1817)

"I have always loved the Fatherland and I was never a traitor. Forgive me, all; and you soldiers, who have always been my people, keep serving the Fatherland as always the Portuguese have."
("Amei sempre a Pátria e nunca fui traidor. Perdoem-me todos, e vocês soldados, que foram sempre a minha gente, continuem a servir a Pátria como sempre a serviram portugueses...")
— Gomes Freire de Andrade, Portuguese military officer (18 October 1817), sentenced to death after being accused of leading a conspiracy against the country's British military government in the name of King John VI.

"You make me drunk. Pray leave me quiet. I feel it affects my head."
— Princess Charlotte of Wales (6 November 1817), dying of postpartum bleeding

"Indolent people! How different your fate would be today if you knew the price of freedom! But it is not too late. See that - although a woman and young - I have more than enough courage to suffer death and a thousand more deaths. Do not forget this example [...] Miserable people, I pity you. Someday you will have more dignity! [...] I am dying to defend the rights of my country."
— Policarpa Salavarrieta, Neogranadine seamstress and spy (14 November 1817), prior to execution by firing squad for high treason

"Come on my brave boys! St. Vin."
— George Rogers Clark, American surveyor, soldier and militia officer (13 February 1818), dying after a stroke

"Do not grieve, my friend, my dearest friend. I am ready to go. And John, it will not be long." (Note: Also reported as, "If I cannot be useful, I do not wish to live.")
— Abigail Adams, First Lady of the United States (28 October 1818), to her husband, John Adams

"Give me back my youth."
— John Wolcot, English satirist (14 January 1819), when asked, "Is there anything I can do for you?"

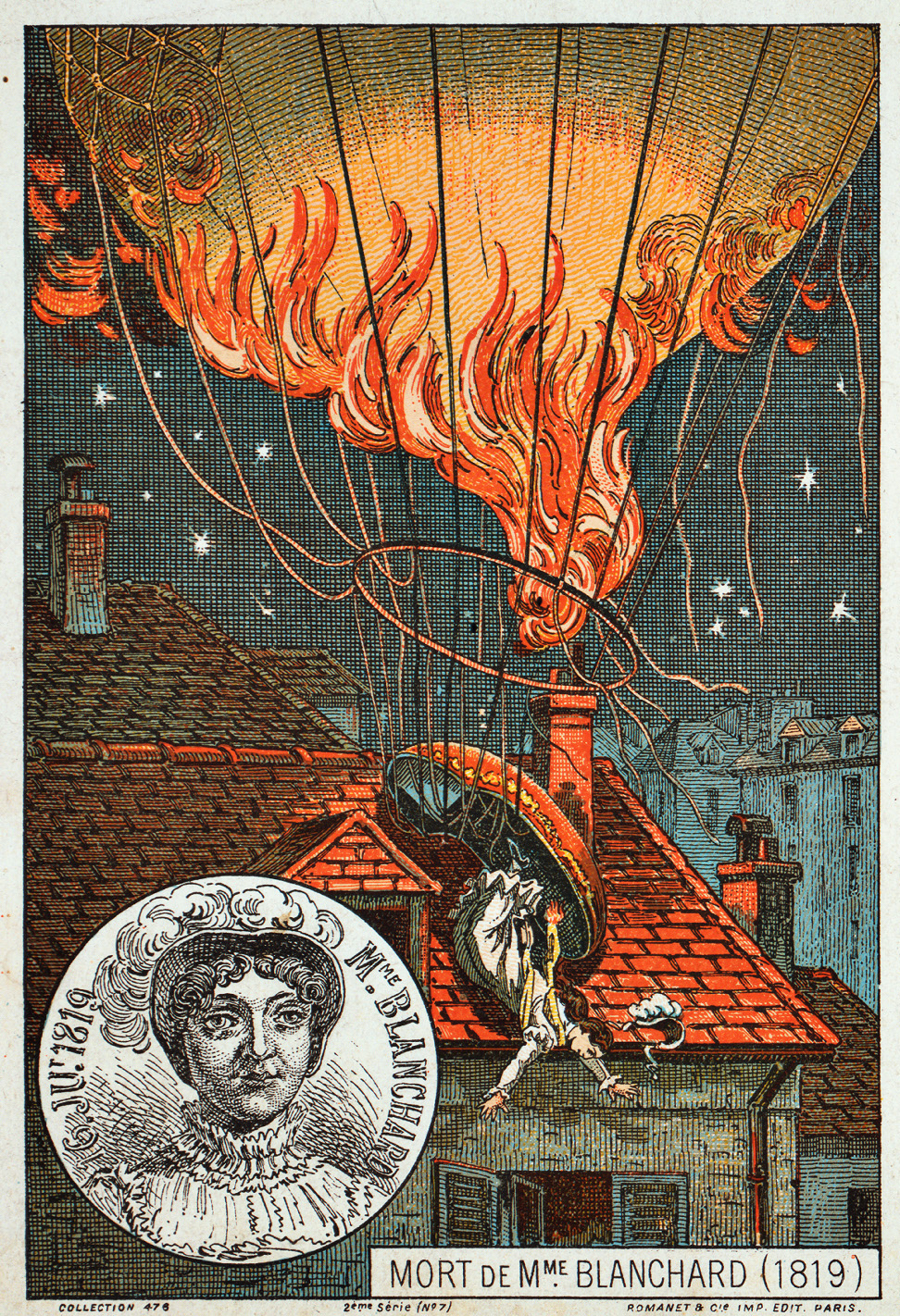
Death of Mme. Blanchard, an illustration from the late 19th century.

"Let's go, this will be for the last time."
("Allons, ce sera pour la dernière fois.")
— Sophie Blanchard, French aeronaut (6 July 1819), prior to lighting fireworks that ignited the gas in her balloon, causing it to crash and Blanchard to fall to her death

"Nostitz, you have learned many a thing from me. Now you are to learn how peacefully a man can die."
— Gebhard Leberecht von Blücher, Prussian field marshal (12 September 1819), to his aide-de-camp, August Ludwig von Nostitz

"Glory to God in the highest. The whole earth shall be filled with his glory."
— Jesse Appleton, second president of Bowdoin College and father of First Lady of the United States Jane Pierce (12 November 1819)

== 1820–1829 ==
"Blessed Virgin, have mercy." (Note: Also reported as, "Sire grâce, grâce pour la vie de l'homme!" ("Sir, pardon, pardon the life of the man!"), pleading with Louis XVIII for the life of his assassin, Louis Pierre Louvel. Nonetheless, Louvel was guillotined.)
— Charles Ferdinand, Duke of Berry (14 February 1820), assassinated at the Paris Opera by Louis Pierre Louvel, a Bonapartist

"If any of you have a message for the devil, give it to me, for I am about to meet him!"
— Lavinia Fisher, American alleged serial killer (18 February 1820), prior to execution by hanging

"I am mortally wounded ... I think."
— Stephen Decatur, United States naval officer (22 March 1820), mortally wounded in duel with James Barron

"Oh, my homeland!"
("¡Ay, patria mía!")
— Manuel Belgrano, Argentine economist, lawyer, politician, journalist, and military leader (20 June 1820)

"I'm going now. My time has come."
— Daniel Boone, American pioneer and frontiersman (26 September 1820)

"Soul of Christ, sanctify me; Body of Christ, save me; Blood of Christ, inebriate me; Water out of the side of Christ, strengthen me. Jesus, Mary, Joseph."
— Elizabeth Ann Seton, SC, American Catholic religious sister and educator (4 January 1821), saying the Anima Christi

"I can feel the daisies growing over me." (Note: Also reported as, "I feel the flowers growing over me", "I die of a broken heart", and as "Severn, lift me up, for I am dying. I shall die easy. Don't be frightened. Be firm and thank God it has come.")
— John Keats, English poet (23 February 1821)

"Hobbema, my dear Hobbema, how I have loved you!" (Note: Also reported as, "O Hobbema, Hobbema, how I do love thee!")
— John Crome, English landscape artist (22 April 1821)

"I was born a Greek, I shall die a Greek."
("Εγώ Γραικός γεννήθηκα, Γραικός θε να πεθάνω.")
— Athanasios Diakos, Greek military commander (24 April 1821), prior to execution for refusal to convert from Christianity to Islam and become an Ottoman officer

"France, the army, the head of the army, Joséphine." (Note: Also reported as, "Mon Dieu! La nation Française. Tête d'armée!")
("France, armée, tête d'armée, Joséphine.")
— Napoleon, emperor of the French (5 May 1821)

"Go my friend, dispatch poor Vasiliky, that these dogs may not profane her beauteous form."
— Ali Pasha of Ioannina, Ottoman Albanian ruler (24 January 1822), ordering that his mistress be killed to save her from enemy soldiers of Mahmud II. Vasiliky was captured but pardoned and lived until 1834.

"Bankhead, let me fall into your arms. It is all over."
— Robert Stewart, Viscount Castlereagh, Anglo-Irish statesman (12 August 1822); to his personal physician, Dr. Charles Bankhead, after cutting his throat

"Put it down, hussy! Do you think I cannot help myself?"
— Eva Marie Veigel, Viennese dancer and wife of David Garrick (16 October 1822), telling a servant to put down a cup of tea prior to dying at age 98

"Open the gates! Open the gates!"
— Sarah Wesley, wife of Charles Wesley (28 December 1822)

"Golgotha, Gethsemene."
— John Heckewelder, American missionary for the Moravian Church (21 January 1823)

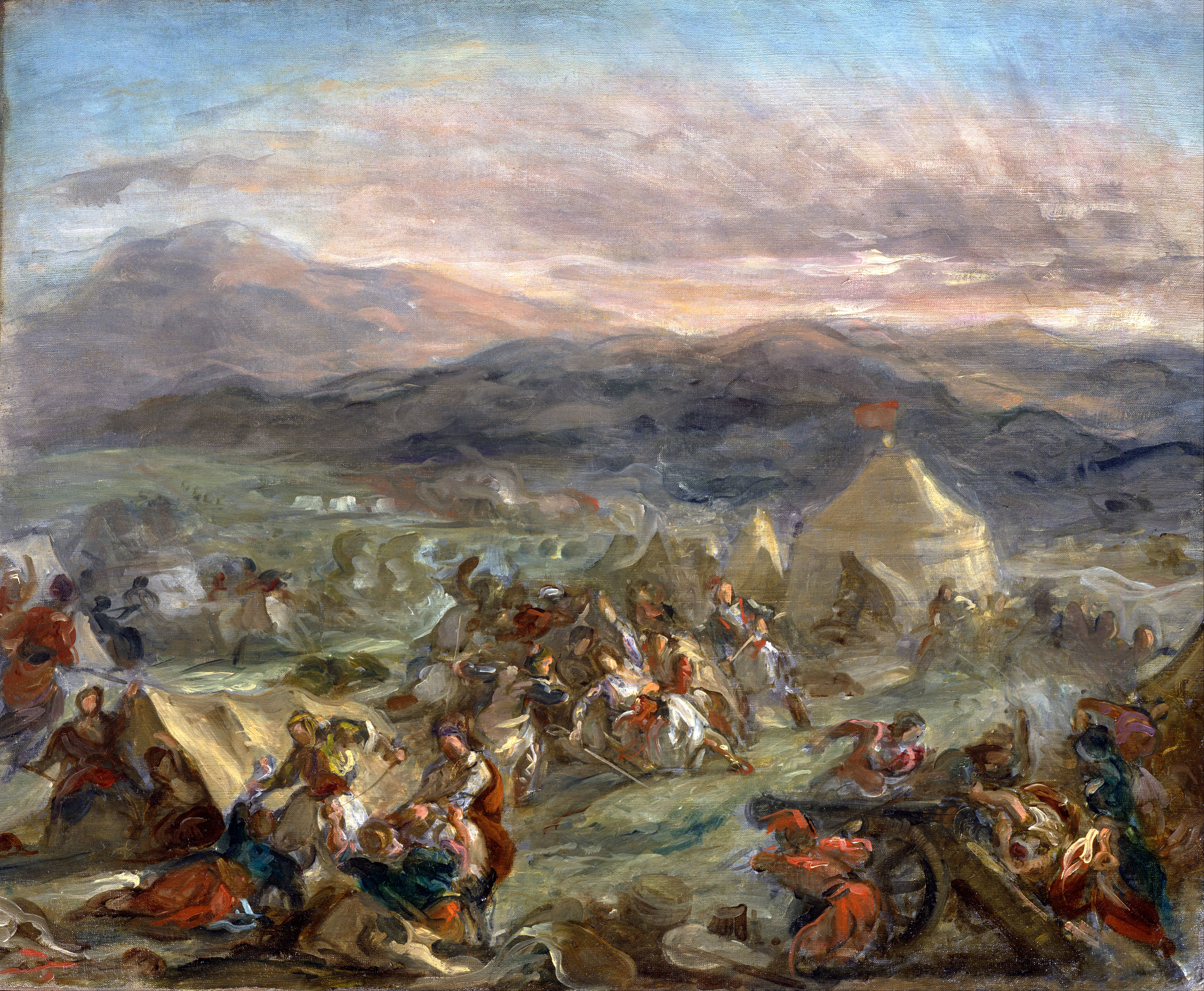
Botsaris surprises the Turkish camp and falls fatally wounded by Eugène Delacroix

"To die for liberty is a pleasure and not a pain."
— Markos Botsaris, Greek general, hero of the Greek War of Independence (21 August 1823), killed in action in attack on Karpenisi

"Are we not children, all of us?"
— Jane Taylor, English poet and novelist, author of "Twinkle, Twinkle, Little Star" (13 April 1824) (Note: Year of death incorrectly given by Marvin as 1823.)

"I must sleep now." (Note: alternatively reported as "Let not my body be sent to England. Here let my bones molder. Lay me in the first corner without pomp or nonsense." (to his physician, Dr. Julius Michael Millingen), "Io lascio qualque cosa di caro nel Mondo" ("I leave something dear to the World"'), "The damned doctors have drenched me so that I can scarcely stand", "Shall I sue for mercy? Come, come, no weakness: let me be a man to the last." (note: The preceding "last words" are recorded by his biographer Leslie A. Marchand as having been pronounced on various final days of Byron, but are not his last words.) "Now I shall go to sleep. Good night", "I want to sleep now" (to his servant Fletcher))
— Lord Byron, English poet (19 April 1824)

"A king should die standing."
— Louis XVIII, King of France (16 September 1824)

"Is Lawrence come—is Lawrence come?"
— Henry Fuseli, Swiss painter, draughtsman and writer on art (17 April 1825), anticipating the arrival of a friend

"My beautiful flowers, my lovely flowers!"
— Jean Paul, German Romantic writer (14 November 1825), touching a wreath of flowers he had been given. Jean Paul had lost his senses of sight and smell before his death.

"You must be tired." (Note: Also reported as, "What a beautiful day" (when his window blinds were opened) and as "Give me the remedies that you judge necessary" (when his physician suggested applying leeches).)
("Que vous devezêtre fatiguée.")
— Alexander I of Russia (1 December [O.S. 19 November] 1825), to his wife, Elizabeth Alexeievna (Louise of Baden)

"No, doctor, nothing more." (Note: Also reported as, "This is the Fourth?")
— Thomas Jefferson, president of the United States (4 July 1826), talking to his doctor

"Thomas Jefferson survives." (Note: Possibly only the name "Jefferson..." or "Thomas Jefferson..." was comprehensible.)
— John Adams, president of the United States (4 July 1826), unaware that Jefferson had died earlier that same day

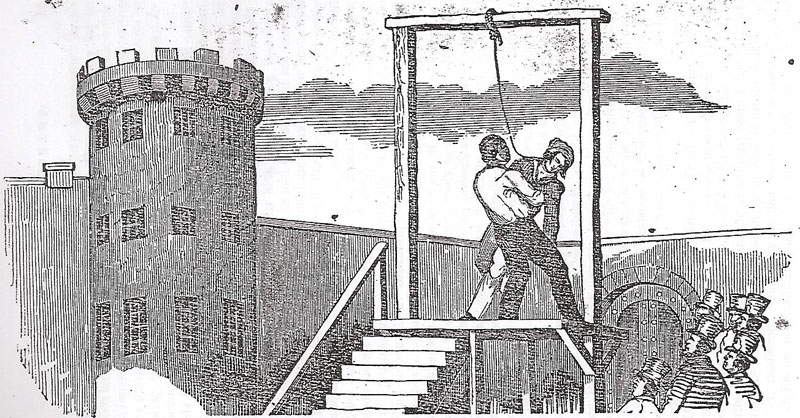
The hanging of Jereboam O. Beauchamp.

"Farewell child of sorrow—Farewell child of misfortune and persecution—you are now secure from the tongue of slander—for you I have lived; for you I die."
— Jereboam O. Beauchamp, American lawyer and murderer (7 July 1826), to his wife. Beauchamp had murdered Kentucky legislator Solomon P. Sharp to avenge his wife's honor. Beauchamp and his wife both stabbed themselves on the morning of his execution; his wife died of her wounds, while Beauchamp survived to be hanged.

"Nothing succeeds with me. Even here, I meet with disappointment."
— Mikhail Bestuzhev-Ryumin, Russian officer (25 July N.S. 1826), when the rope broke during his hanging for having helped organize the Decemberist revolt

"Voltaire." (Note: Also reported as, "The worst is I cannot see.")
— François-Joseph Talma, French actor (19 October 1826)

"I feel quite well, only very weak."
— Ann Hasseltine Judson, American foreign missionary (24 October 1826), dying of smallpox in Amherst, Burma

"What we know is little; what we are ignorant of is immense."
("Ce que nous connaisons est peu de chose; ce que nous ignorons est immense.")
— Pierre-Simon Laplace, French scholar and polymath (5 March 1827)

"Pity, pity - too late!" (Note: Beethoven's last words are subject to ongoing debate; however, these words were his last recorded.)
— Ludwig van Beethoven, German composer (26 March 1827), being informed that his publisher had gifted him 12 bottles of wine

"Brother, brother, strong evidences, nothing but strong evidences will do in such an hour as this. I have looked here and looked there for them, and all have failed me, and so I cast myself on the sovereign, free and full grace of God in the covenant by Jesus Christ; and there, brother, there I have found peace."
— Legh Richmond, Church of England clergyman and writer (8 May 1827)

"Faith and patience hold out." (Note: Also reported as, "I feel like a mote in the sunbeam.")
— Edward Payson, American Congregational preacher (22 October 1827)

"Children and friends, pay attention to my last words. After I am gone, be kind to the missionaries; be kind also to the other Europeans; welcome them to the shore, trade with them, protect them, and live with them as one people. But if ever there should land on this shore a people who wear red garments, who do no work, who neither buy nor sell, and who always have arms in their hands, then be aware that these are a people called soldiers, a dangerous people whose only occupation is war. When you see them, make war against them. Then, oh, my children, be brave! Then, O friends, be strong! Be brave, that you may not be enslaved, and that your country may not become the possession of strangers."
— Hongi Hika, New Zealand Māori rangatira (chief) and war leader of the iwi of Ngāpuhi (6 March 1828). Despite his wishes, New Zealand would go on to become a British colony.

"Here, here is my end." (Note: Also reported as, "Oh! this is the last of all" (grasping his physician's hand).)
("Hier, hier ist mein Ende.")
— Franz Schubert, Austrian composer (19 November 1828)

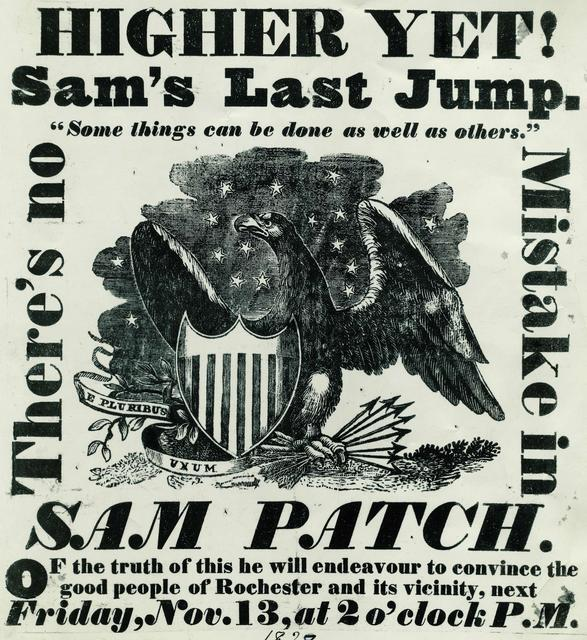
Advertisement for Sam Patch's last jump.

"Napoleon was a great man and a great general. He conquered armies and he conquered nations. But he couldn't jump the Genesee Falls. Wellington was a great man and a great soldier. He conquered armies and he conquered Napoleon, but he couldn't jump the Genesee Falls. That was left for me to do, and I can do it and will!"
— Sam Patch, American daredevil (13 November 1829), prior to fatal leap from Genesee Falls

== 1830–1839 ==
"Quick, quick! some vinegar! I am fainting."
— Joseph Fourier, French mathematician and physicist (16 May 1830), calling to his physician, who had stepped out of the room

"Fuck, a bullet wound!"
("¡Carajo, un balazo!")
— Antonio José de Sucre, Venezuelan independence leader and President of Peru and Bolivia (4 June 1830), after being shot while riding in the jungle of Colombia. He was said to be an educated gentleman who had never cursed until that day.

"O God! I am dying." (To his physician) "This is death." (Note: Also reported as, "Watty, what is this? It is death, my boy. They have deceived me" (to his physician, SirWathen Waller).)
— George IV, King of the United Kingdom of Great Britain and Ireland (26 June 1830)

"Well, I've had a happy life." (Note: Also reported as, "I have led a happy life.")
— William Hazlitt, English essayist and critic (18 September 1830)

"Is this death?"
— John Quick, English actor (4 April 1831)

"Is there anybody in the room?"
— John Abernethy, English surgeon (20 April 1831)

"Nature, how lovely thou art!"
— Victor Yvart, French agronomist (19 June 1831)

"I regret that I should leave this world without again beholding him."
— James Monroe, president of the United States (4 July 1831), referring to his close friend James Madison

"Oh God, what an injustice."
("O Arglwydd, dyma gamwedd.")
— Dic Penderyn, Welsh laborer and coal miner (13 August 1831), prior to execution by hanging for the non-fatal stabbing of a soldier during the Merthyr Rising. Another man confessed to the stabbing on his deathbed in 1874.

"Only one man ever understood me. And he really didn't understand me." (Note: Also reported as "Immer nur Du hast mich verstanden ... und Sie haben es falsch" ("Only you have ever understood me ... and you got it wrong"), addressed to his favorite student.)
— Georg Wilhelm Friedrich Hegel, German philosopher (14 November 1831)

"Do open the shutter in the bed-room, in order that more light may enter." (Note: Also reported as "Mehr Licht!" ("More light!"), "Please open the second window of the bedroom so that more light can enter", and, to his daughter-in-law Ottilie von Pogwisch, "Komm, meine Kleine, und gib mir deine Hand" ("Come, my little one, and give me your hand").)
("Macht doch den Fensterladen im Schlafgemach auf, damit mehr Licht herein komme.")
— Johann Wolfgang von Goethe, German statesman and writer (22 March 1832)

"Nurse, it was I who discovered leeches have red blood." (Note: Also reported as saying to his daughter, who was drinking lemonade he had refused, "It is delightful to see those whom I love still able to swallow.")
— Georges Cuvier, French naturalist and zoologist (13 May 1832), to a nurse who was bleeding him

"Happy."
— James Mackintosh FRS FRSE, Scottish jurist, politician and historian (30 May 1832)

"I now feel that I am dying. Our care must be to minimize the pain. Do not let any of the servants come into the room, and keep away the youths. It will be distressing to them, and they can be of no service. Yet I must not be alone, and you will remain with me, and you only, and then we shall have reduced the pain to the least possible amount."
— Jeremy Bentham, English philosopher, jurist and social reformer (6 June 1832), to one of his disciples

"I have written nothing which on my deathbed I should wish blotted." (Note: Also reported as, "Be virtuous, be religious, be a good man; nothing else can give you any comfort when you come to lie here" (to his son-in-law), as "God bless you all. I feel myself again" (to his family), and as "I feel as if I were to be myself again.")
— Walter Scott, Scottish novelist and poet (21 September 1832)

"Gentlemen of the jury, you may retire." (Note: Also reported as, "Gentlemen, you are all dismissed" and as "Gentlemen of the jury, you will now consider of your verdict.")
— Charles Abbott, 1st Baron Tenterden, Lord Chief Justice of the King's Bench (4 November 1832), thinking he was in court

"My boy, the quenelles de sole were splendid, but the peas were poor. You should shake the pan gently, all the time, like this."
— Marie-Antoine Carême, French chef (12 January 1833), to a pupil

"Thank God, to-morrow I shall join the glorious company above."
— Samuel Drew, Cornish Methodist theologian (29 March 1833); last recorded words

"Christ also hath once suffered for sins, the just for the unjust, that he might bring us unto God."
— Rowland Hill, English preacher, evangelical and vaccination advocate (11 April 1833), quoting 1 Peter 3:18

"Write that word 'Remorse'; show it to me."
— John Randolph of Roanoke, American planter and politician (24 May 1833) (Note: Marvin describes these last words as doubtful.)

"If I should die, it will not be for the beating I received, but from mortification. I would rather have died than been beaten in that fight."
— Simon Byrne, Irish bare-knuckle boxer (2 June 1833), dying after fight against James Burke

"Thank God that I have lived to see the day when England is willing to give twenty millions for the abolition of slavery." (Note: Also reported as, "Heaven!" and as "I now feel so weaned from earth, my affections so much in heaven, that I can leave you all without regret; yet I do not love you less, but God more.")
— William Wilberforce, British politician (29 July 1833)

"Patty, Joy."
— Hannah More, English religious writer and philanthropist (7 September 1833)

"Tired—very tired—a long journey—to take."
— Kaspar Hauser (17 December 1833)

"Now I can hold out here no longer. Lay me in a different posture."
— Friedrich Schleiermacher, German Reformed theologian, philosopher and biblical scholar (12 February 1834)

"My mind is quite unclouded. I could even be witty."
— Samuel Taylor Coleridge, English poet and literary critic (25 July 1834)

"If I die, I die unto the Lord. Amen." (Note: Also reported as, "In life and in death, I am the Lord's.")
— Edward Irving, Scottish clergyman (7 December 1834)

"My bedfellows are cramp and cough – we three all in one bed!"
— Charles Lamb, English essayist and poet (27 December 1834)

"I feel as if I were sitting with Mary at the feet of my Redeemer, hearing the music of his voice, and learning of Him to be meek and lowly."
— Felicia Hemans, English poet (16 May 1835)

"I am ready."
— Charles Mathews, English theatre manager and comic actor (28 June 1835)

"Perhaps some day they will hear my music without even saying 'Poor Bellini'."
— Vincenzo Bellini, Italian opera composer (23 September 1835)

"It is likely you may never need to do it again."
— James Hogg, Scottish poet, novelist and essayist (21 November 1835), asking his wife to watch by his bedside during the night

"Oh God, this is horrible, this is indeed horrible."
— James Pratt, one of the last two men executed for sodomy in England (27 November 1835), prior to being hanged with the other man, John Smith

"We have now got through all danger – keep up good heart, and when we get to Fort King, I'll give you three days for Christmas."
— Francis L. Dade, United States Army major (28 December 1835), addressing his troops just before being shot and killed in a Seminole ambush which resulted in his unit's destruction.

"Great God, Sue! The Mexicans are inside our walls! All is lost! If they spare you, love our child."
— Almaron Dickinson (6 March 1836), Texian soldier and rebel, killed in action at the Battle of the Alamo; husband of Alamo survivor Susanna Dickinson

"Nothing more than a change of mind, my dear." (Note: Also reported as, "I always talk better lying down.")
— James Madison, president of the United States (28 June 1836), to his niece, who had asked him what was the matter

"Madame."
— Aaron Burr, vice president of the United States (14 September 1836)

"My hope is in Christ."
— John Bannister, English actor and theater manager (7 November 1836)

"What do you think especially gives me comfort at this time? The creation! I ask myself, 'Did Jehovah create the world or did I?' He did! Now if He made the world and all the rolling spheres of the universe, He certainly can take care of me. Into Jesus' hands I can safely commit my spirit!"
— Charles Simeon, English evangelical Anglican clergyman (13 November 1836)

"Texas recognized! Archer told me so. Did you see it in the papers?"
— Stephen F. Austin, founder of Anglo Texas, Secretary of State of the Republic of Texas (27 December 1836)

"Thank you—but don't kiss me; it is the sweat of death. I am dying, and it's for the best."
— John Field, Irish pianist and composer (23 January 1837), to his friend Gebhard

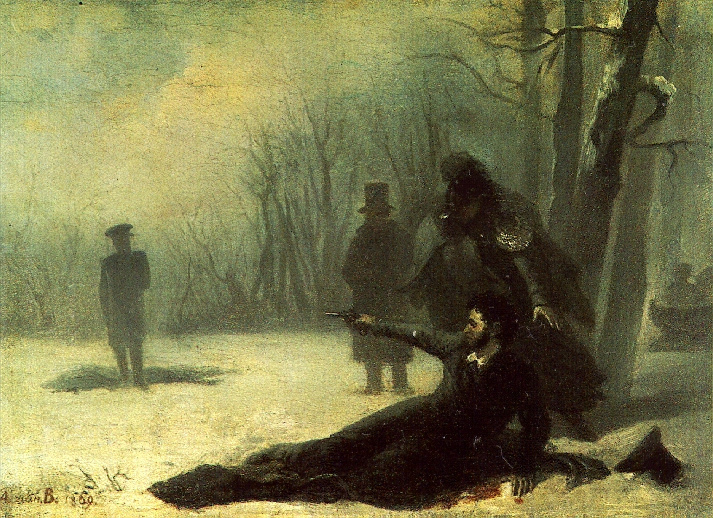
Duel of Pushkin and d'Anthes

"Try to be forgotten. Go live in the country. Stay in mourning for two years, then remarry, but choose somebody decent."
— Alexander Pushkin, Russian poet (10 February [O.S. 29 January] 1837), to his wife, Natalia Pushkina, after being mortally wounded in a duel with Georges-Charles de Heeckeren d'Anthès, who was rumored to be having an affair with Natalia

"It matters not where I am going whether the weather be cold or hot."
— John Scott, 1st Earl of Eldon, British barrister and politician (13 January 1838)

"I am suffering, sire, the pangs of the damned."
— Charles Maurice de Talleyrand-Périgord, French clergyman and diplomat (17 May 1838), to Louis Philippe I, who had asked how he was

"I am about to leave you. I have labored in the sanctuary fifty-three years, and this is my comfort and confidence, that I have never labored without blood in the vessel. Goodbye! Drive on!"
— Christmas Evans, Welsh nonconformist minister (19 July 1838)

== 1840–1849 ==
"I am ready."
— Nathanael Emmons, American Congregational minister and theologian (23 September 1840)

"Sir, I wish you to understand the true principles of the government. I wish them carried out. I ask nothing more."
— William Henry Harrison, president of the United States (4 April 1841), to his doctor but possibly intended for John Tyler, his vice-president and successor

"Now I die."
— Joseph Blanco White, Spanish political thinker, theologian and poet (20 May 1841)

"Good-bye."
— Edward Nares, English historian, theologian and writer (23 July 1841)

"Hold me in your arms."
— Charles Bell, Scottish physician, artist and philosophical theologian (28 April 1842), to his wife

"Ah, very well."
— Thomas Arnold, English educator and historian (12 June 1842), to his physician, who had described his serious prognosis and treatment

"You need not be anxious concerning tonight. It will be very peaceful and quiet with me."
— William Ellery Channing, American Unitarian preacher and theologian (2 October 1842)

"Magellan, Magellan!"
("¡Magallanes, Magallanes!")
— Bernardo O'Higgins, Chilean independence leader and statesman (24 October 1842)

"I strike my flag."
— Isaac Hull, United States Navy Commodore (13 February 1843)

"I have struggled with many difficulties. Some I have been able to overcome and by some I have been overcome. I have made many mistakes but I love my country and have labored for the youth of my country, and I trust no precept of mine has taught any dear youth to sin." (Note: Webster's first name is incorrectly given by Ward as "Daniel".)
— Noah Webster, American lexicographer and textbook pioneer (28 May 1843)

"Peace!"
— Alden Bradford, American politician, clergyman and author (26 October 1843)

"I shall soon be with Him. Victory, victory, victory forever."
— William Gadsby, English Baptist pastor (27 January 1844), raising his hand before the word "forever"

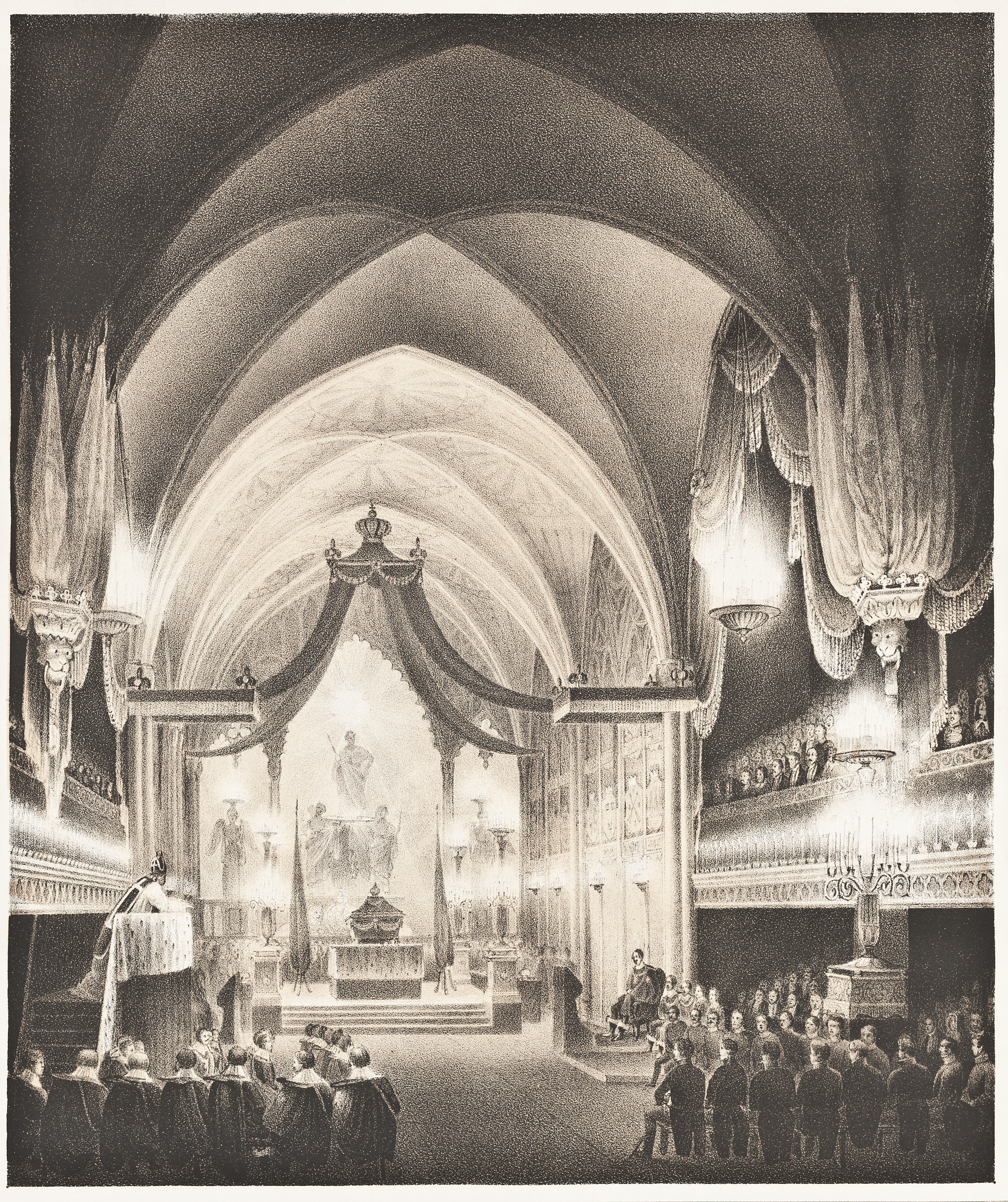
Funeral of Charles XIV John in Riddarholm Church

"Oscar."
("Oskar.")
— Charles XIV John, King of Sweden and Norway (8 March 1844), whispering the name of his son and heir

"Come quick! Quick!"
— William Beckford, English novelist and art collector (2 May 1844), in a message to his daughter

"When I think of the existence which shall commence when the stone is laid over my head, how can literary fame appear to me, to any one, but as nothing? I believe, when I am gone, justice will be done to me in this way — that I was a pure writer. It is an inexpressible comfort, at my time of life, to be able to look back and feel that I have not written one line against religion or virtue." (Note: Not necessarily Campbell's very last words.)
— Thomas Campbell, Scottish poet (15 June 1844)

"I am a dead man!"
— Hyrum Smith, American religious leader in the Church of Christ (Latter Day Saints), brother of Joseph Smith (27 June 1844), killed by a mob along with his brother

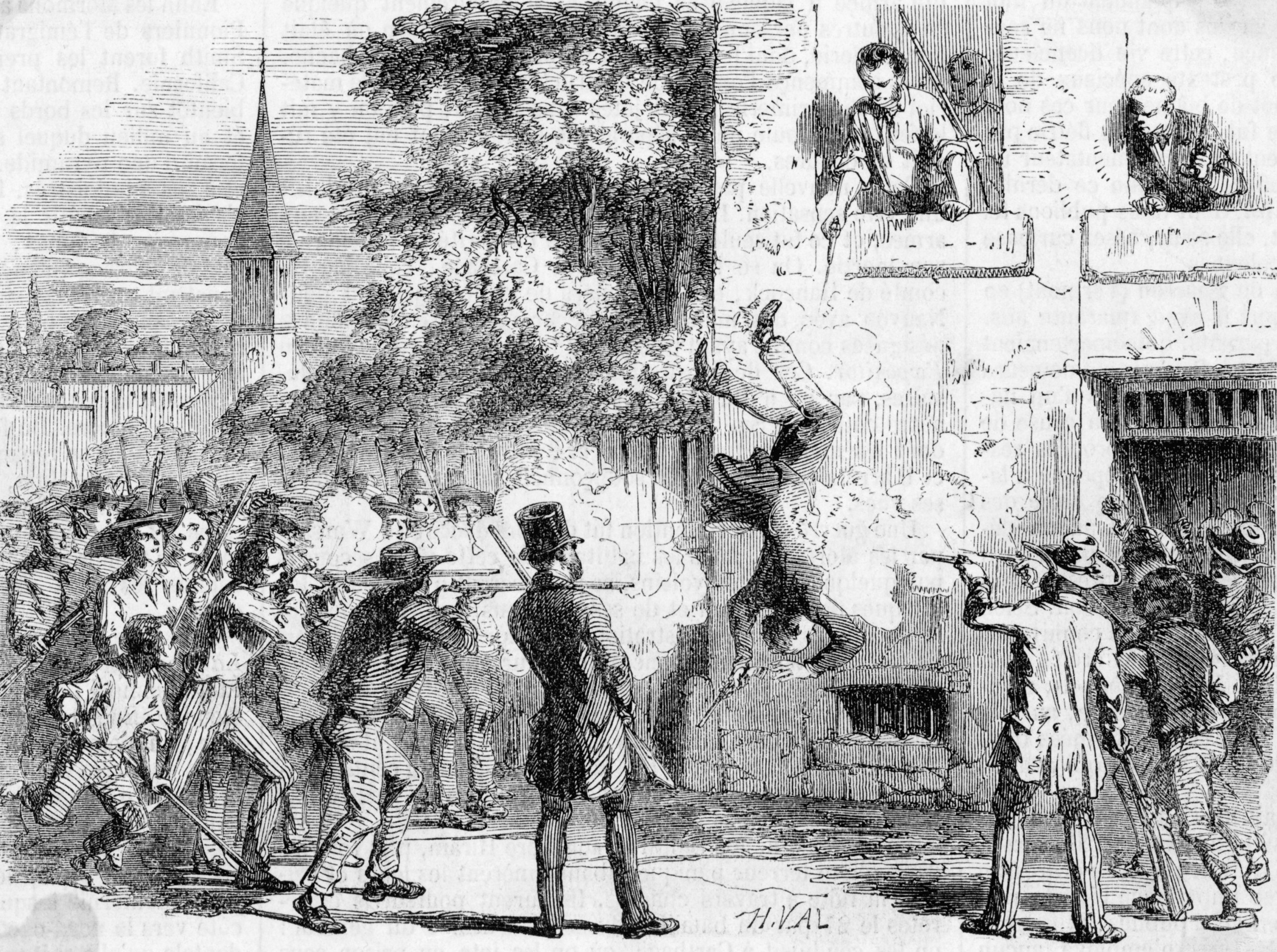
Death of Joseph Smith.

"O Lord my God!" (Note: Also reported as, "That's right, Brother Taylor; parry them off as well as you can.")
— Joseph Smith, founder of Mormonism (27 June 1844), before falling from a window during his murder

"Will no one have pity on me? Here, fire here?"
— Gabriel de la Concepción Valdés, Afro-Cuban poet and independence activist (28 June 1844), during execution by firing squad for conspiracy (Note: Date of death incorrectly given by Marvin as July 1844.)

"Examine it for yourself."
— Thomas Webster, Scottish geologist (26 December 1844)

"Dying, Dying."
— Thomas Hood, English poet, author and humorist (3 May 1845)

"What is the matter with my dear children? Have I alarmed you? Oh, do not cry. Be good children and we will all meet in Heaven." (Note: Also reported as, "I hope to meet each of you in heaven. Be good, children, all of you, and strive to be ready when the change comes" and as "My dear children, do not grieve for me...I am my God's. I belong to Him. I go but a short time before you, and...I hope and trust to meet you all in heaven." Jackson subsequently asked an enslaved person named George to remove two of his three pillows.)
— Andrew Jackson, president of the United States (8 June 1845)

"Happy, happy."
— Andrew Combe, Scottish physician and phrenologist (9 August 1847)

"Though He slay me, yet will I trust in Him."
— Grace Aguilar, English author (16 September 1847), quoting Job 13:15

"Weary, very weary."
— Felix Mendelssohn, German composer (4 November 1847), in response to being asked how he felt

"Peace! Joy!"
— Henry Francis Lyte, Anglican poet (20 November 1847)

"This is the last of Earth. I am content."
— John Quincy Adams, president of the United States (23 February 1848), after collapsing in the United States Capitol

"There, I told you that she would pay it if you went the right way to work with her."
— John Jacob Astor, German-American multi-millionaire businessman (29 March 1848), to his son. Astor had been worried about an overdue rent payment. His son paid the woman's rent and claimed that she had paid it.

"It is now half-past nine. World, adieu!"
— Frederick Marryat, Royal Navy officer and novelist (9 August 1848)

"Go, your countrymen need you. For me, there is now no more you can do."
— Christina Petronella (de Wit) Pretorius (September 1848), to her husband, Voortrekker leader Andries Pretorius, who had been asked to lead the Boers at the Battle of Boomplaats

"I am ready—let there be no mistake and no delay."
— Robert Blum, German democratic politician and revolutionist (9 November 1848), prior to execution by firing squad

"If you will send for a doctor I will see him now." (Note: Also reported as, "No, no!" (when one of her sisters asked her to allow herself to be put to bed).)
— Emily Brontë, English novelist (19 December 1848), to her sister Charlotte

"I am food for what I am good for—worms. I ought to have been among other things a good poet. Life was too great a bore on one peg & that a bad one.—Buy for Dr. Ecklin above mentioned Reade's best stomach pump."
— Thomas Lovell Beddoes, English poet, dramatist and physician (26 January 1849), concluding his suicide note

"Did the doctors really say I was not to get up?—If they said so, then I won't get up; but I feel well.—No, I will keep them [the pillows] as the doctors left them."
— Sir Andrew Agnew, 7th Baronet, Scottish politician (28 April 1849)

"Take courage, Charlotte; take courage."
— Anne Brontë, English novelist (28 May 1849), to her sister Charlotte

"I love you, Sarah. For all eternity, I love you."
— James K. Polk, president of the United States (15 June 1849), to his wife, Sarah Childress Polk

"Lord, help my poor soul." (Note: Also reported as, "Nevermore.")
— Edgar Allan Poe, American writer (7 October 1849)

"Not yet." (Note: Also reported as, "Jouez Mozart en mémoire de moi et je vais vous entendre" ("Play Mozart in memory of me – and I will hear you") and "Maintenant, j'entre en agonie. Plus" ("Now is my final agony. No more").)
("Pas encore.")
— Frédéric Chopin, Polish composer and pianist (17 October 1849), asked by his physician if he was suffering

"Wonderful! Wonderful this death!"
— William Etty, English artist (13 November 1849), watching the sunset over the River Ouse, Yorkshire

== 1850–1859 ==
"The South! The poor South! God knows what will become of her." (Note: Also reported as, "I am perfectly comfortable.")
— John C. Calhoun, vice president of the United States (31 March 1850)

"Brother Ranney, will you bury me? bury me?—quick! quick! Take care of poor mistress."
— Adoniram Judson, American Congregationalist and Particular Baptist missionary (12 April 1850), dying at sea in the Bay of Bengal. Judson was buried at sea.

"God bless you! Is that you, Dora?"
— William Wordsworth, English poet (23 April 1850), referring to his daughter, who had died three years earlier

"I am about to die. I expect the summons soon. I have endeavored to discharge all my official duties faithfully. I regret nothing, but am sorry that I am about to leave my friends." (Note: Also reported as, "I am prepared to die. I have faithfully endeavored to do my duty" and as "I have tried to do my duty, and am not afraid to die. I am ready.")
— Zachary Taylor, president of the United States (9 July 1850), dying in office

"I am weary; I will now go to sleep. Good night!"
— August Neander, German theologian and church historian (14 July 1850)

"I can no longer read or write. De Balzac." (Note: Also reported as, "Ah yes! I know. I need Bianchon—Bianchon would save me!" ("Ah oui! Je sais. Il me faudrait Bianchon—Bianchon me sauverait lui!") or as "Go look for Bianchon" ("Allez chercher Bianchon!"), referring to Doctor Horace Bianchon, a recurring character in Balzac's novel sequence La Comédie humaine. Writer Michael D. Garval referred to the reference to Bianchon as too good to be true.)
— Honoré de Balzac, French novelist and playwright (18 August 1850), written across the bottom of a letter from his wife

"Ah! Coquereau, I forgot to mention one of the greatest faults of my life. I have spoken badly of Charles X!"
— Félix Arvers, French poet and dramatist (7 November 1850), to his confessor

"I am not able to explain myself."
— Frédéric Bastiat, French economist and writer (24 December 1850)

"Yes, yes, Billy! You go down that side on Long Pond, and I'll go this side, and we'll get the ducks."
— John James Audubon, American ornithologist, naturalist and painter (27 January 1851), speaking to his friend William Bakewell while suffering from senility

"Neither life nor death, nor any being can separate us from Him."
— Paul-Thérèse-David d'Astros, French Roman Catholic cardinal and archbishop (29 September 1851)

"Give me! Give me! Come on, give me! The ladder! Quick, pass me the ladder!"
— Nikolai Gogol, Russian author of Ukrainian origin (4 March [O.S. 21 February] 1852), in delirium

"Yes, if you please."
— Arthur Wellesley, 1st Duke of Wellington (14 September 1852), upon being asked if he would like a sip of tea by his valet.

"'I still live!" (Note: Also reported as "Life, life! Death, death! How curious it is!")
— Daniel Webster, American statesman (24 October 1852)

"Let the earth be filled with His glory."
— William Broughton, Anglican Bishop of Australia (20 February 1853)

"I will now try to sleep."
— Samuel Appleton, American merchant and philanthropist (12 July 1853), to his wife

"I cannot bear it; let me rest. I must die. Let God do his work."
— Frederick William Robertson, English divine (15 August 1853), when attendants tried to change his position

"I intend to resign my situation of perpetual secretary to the Academy, since I can no longer discharge its duties."
— François Arago, French mathematician, physicist and astronomer (2 October 1853), to his associate Jean-Baptiste Biot

"Teixeira? If I am in danger, tell me; do not deceive me." (Note: These are the Queen's last recorded words; the Cardinal Patriarch arrived shortly afterward and she is known to have recited the Act of Contrition and confessed.)
("Ó Teixeira? Se tenho perigo, diga-mo; não me engane.")
— Maria II, queen regnant of Portugal (15 November 1853), addressing her surgeon during her eleventh childbirth

"O Paradise! O Paradise! At last comes to me the grand consolation. My prisons disappear; the great of earth pass away; all before me is rest."
— Silvio Pellico, Italian dramatist, poet and patriot, author of My Prisons) (31 January 1854)

"Is this death?"
— George Lippard, American author, social activist and labor organizer (9 February 1854), to his physician

"Let me bleed."
— François Xavier Aubry, French Canadian merchant and explorer (18 August 1854), mortally wounded in saloon fight by Richard Hanson Weightman

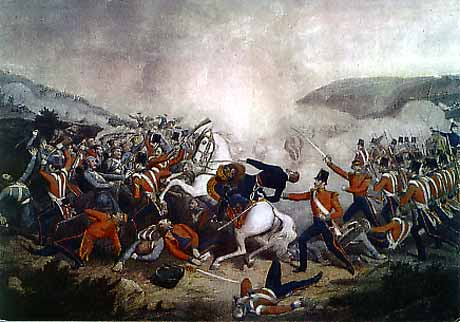
Death of Cathcart at Inkerman.

"I fear we are in a mess."
— George Cathcart, British general and diplomat (5 November 1854), prior to his death at the Battle of Inkerman

"I no longer see you."
("Eu já o não vejo.")
— Almeida Garrett, Portuguese author (9 December 1854), addressing his friend Francisco

"If you wish for another cheerful evening with your old friend, there is no time to be lost."
— Mary Russell Mitford, English author and dramatist (10 January 1855)

"I feel that I must come like the poor publican, like the thief on the cross, and like Mary Magdalene. I must come to the foot of the cross and be saved just in the same manner as they."
— Benjamin Parsons, English congregational minister (10 January 1855)

"Thee while the first Archangel sings, He hides his face behind his wings."
— Joseph Beaumont, English Methodist minister (21 January 1855), announcing the first lines of a hymn to his congregation. He then fell dead as they sang the second line.

"Cover my face."
— Hedley Vicars, British Army officer and evangelical (22 March 1855), killed in action in the Crimean War

"Oh, I am not going to die, am I? He will not separate us. We have been so happy."
— Charlotte Brontë, English author (31 March 1855), addressing her husband Arthur

"Do not kill me! I did not come to fight you!"
— Andrew Bolon, American Bureau of Indian Affairs agent (25 September 1855), prior to his throat being cut by a member of the Yakama

"That fellow hit me."
— Thomas Washington Barber, American abolitionist (6 December 1855); shot along with his horse by slavery supporters near Lawrence, Kansas

"Write! Write! Write! Paper! Pencil!" (Note: Also reported as, "Set your mind at rest, God will pardon me. That's his line of work" ("Gott wird mir vergeben. Das ist seine Arbeit") and as "I am done for.")
— Heinrich Heine, German writer and literary critic (17 February 1856)

"This oppression is altogether physical: God is not the less with me. I am waiting for Him in the faith of Jesus Christ and of the Holy Spirit."
— Adolphe Monod, French Protestant churchman (6 April 1856)

"Don't disturb me. I am too full. O! what a glorious sight."
— John Bryan, Welsh Wesleyan Methodist minister (28 May 1856)

"The worse, the better for me."
— Edward Alderson, English lawyer and judge (27 January 1857), when asked how he felt

"How great is the forgiveness for such a life!"
— Eugène François Vidocq, French criminal turned criminalist (11 May 1857)

"Let there be no fuss about me; let me be buried with the men."
— Henry Montgomery Lawrence, British military officer and statesman (4 July 1857), mortally wounded at Siege of Lucknow

"My God, my God! Enlighten us. Inspire in a united mankind the love of the good, the love of well being.—To do good, to live for others—that's happiness. Charity, charity, for all the world to be happy. —Widows, small boys—help them."
— Pierre-Jean de Béranger, French poet and chansonnier (16 July 1857)

"What an irreparable loss!"
— Auguste Comte, French philosopher (5 September 1857)

"It will soon be time for mass. They must raise me."
— Sophie Swetchine, Russian Roman Catholic mystic (10 September 1857)

"Come, my son, and see how a Christian can die."
— Henry Havelock KCB, British Army general (24 November 1857)

"Mid pleasures and palaces though we may roam / Be it ever so humble, there's no place like home / A charm from the skies seems to hallow us there / Which seek thro' the world, is ne'er met elsewhere / Home! Home! / Sweet, sweet home! / There's no place like home / There's no place like home!"
— Luigi Lablache, Italian operatic bass (23 January 1858). After singing the first stanza of Home! Sweet Home! on his deathbed, his voice failed at the start of the second stanza.

"I am comfortable and content." (Note: Also reported as, "Do you hear that? Kitty, that is the death rattle" (to his nurse).)
— Thomas Hart Benton, United States Senator from Missouri (10 April 1858)

"I am looking to the Savior. My only hope is in Jesus."
— James Maitland Hog, Scottish advocate and landowner (1 August 1858), spelling out his final words on a printed alphabet with a reed in his mouth

"I lost."
("J 'ai perdu.")
— Karl August Varnhagen von Ense, German biographer, diplomat and soldier (10 October 1858), playing chess with his young niece

"I have peace, perfect peace. 'Thou wilt keep him in perfect peace whose mind is stayed on thee.'"
— Benjamin Franklin Butler, Attorney General of the United States (8 November 1858), quoting Isaiah 26:3

"Relief has come."
— Robert Owen, Welsh textile manufacturer, philanthropist and social reformer (17 November 1858)

"If there is a Christian's God, I am not afraid to trust myself in his hands."
— Frederick W. Adams, American physician, author and violin maker (17 December 1858)

"Murder! Don't kill me!"
— Philip Barton Key II, American lawyer who served as U.S. Attorney for the District of Columbia (27 February 1859), pleading to his murderer Daniel Sickles, with whose wife Key had an affair

"How grand those rays! They seem to beckon earth to heaven."
— Alexander von Humboldt, German polymath (6 May 1859)

"Comfort my Peter."
("Consolem o meu Pedro.")
— Stephanie of Hohenzollern-Sigmaringen, queen consort of Portugal (17 July 1859)

"Sister! sister! sister!"
— Thomas De Quincey, English essayist (8 August 1859), to a vision of his dead sister

"Well, I must arrange my pillows for another night – when will this end!"
— Washington Irving, American writer and diplomat (28 November 1859)

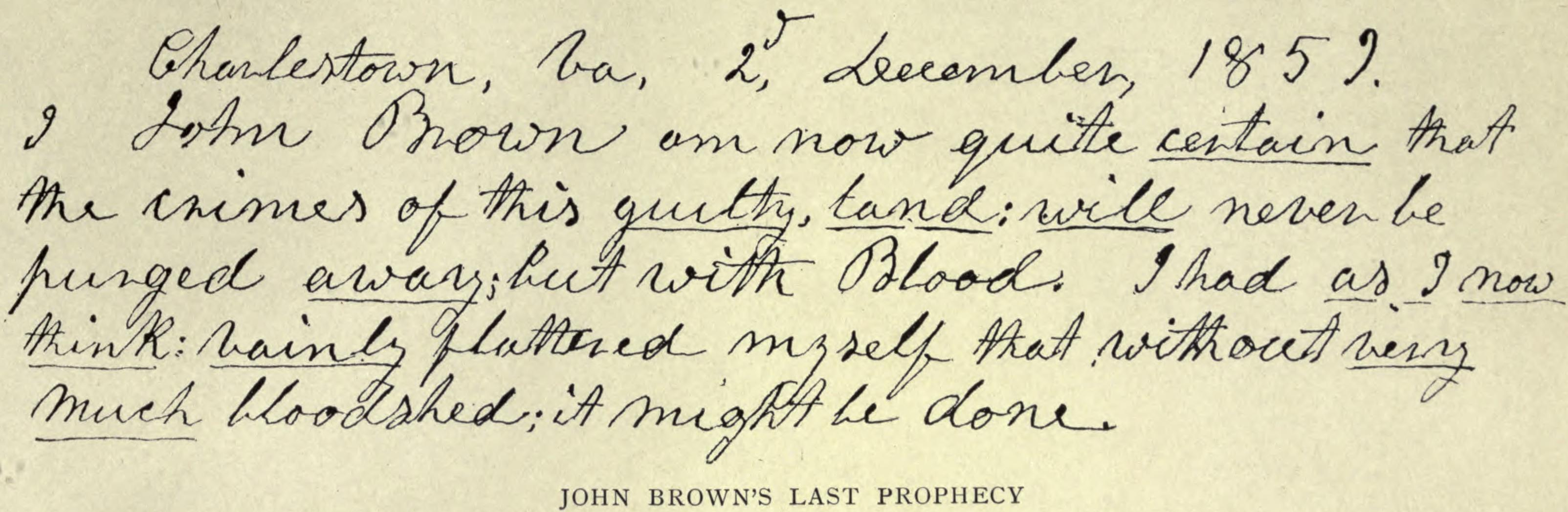
John Brown's last words, passed to a jailor on his way to the gallows.

"I, John Brown, am now quite certain that the crimes of this guilty land will never be purged away but with Blood. I had, as I now think, vainly flattered myself that without very much bloodshed it might be done." (Note: Brown's final spoken words were, "I am ready at any time—do not keep me waiting.")
— John Brown, American abolitionist (2 December 1859), final written words prior to execution by hanging

"I shall retire early; I am very tired."
— Thomas Babington Macaulay, British historian and politician (28 December 1859), to his butler

== 1860–1869 ==
"It is all one, Phillips and Clarke will come for my sake."
— Theodore Parker, American transcendentalist, Unitarian minister and abolitionist (10 May 1860), referring to notables who would attend his funeral (Note: Year of death incorrectly given by Marvin as 1869.)

"I'm choking."
("Jag kvävs.")
— Desideria, Queen of Sweden and Norway (17 December 1860), after collapsing in a staircase of Stockholm Palace

"No noise, no music, no bohemia!"
— Henri Murger, French author of Scenes of Bohemian Life (28 January 1861)

"Death, death, death."
— Stephen A. Douglas, American politician, Senator from Illinois and 1860 Democratic presidential nominee (3 June 1861)

"No, Your Majesty, to-morrow you will not see me here."
— Camillo Benso, Count of Cavour, Italian statesman, Prime Minister of Italy (6 June 1861), to Victor Emmanuel II of Italy, who had said he would see him tomorrow

"While there is life there is will."
— Patrick Brontë, Irish Anglican priest and author, father of Charlotte, Branwell, Emily and Anne Brontë (7 June 1861)

"It is beautiful." (Note: Also reported as, "Beautiful" (when asked how she was feeling).)
— Elizabeth Barrett Browning, English poet (29 June 1861)

"Boys, they've killed me, but never give it up!" (Note: Also reported as, "My God, boys, they have got me, but never give up the field.")
— Francis S. Bartow, American and Confederate politician and brigade commander of the American Civil War (21 July 1861), mortally wounded at the First Battle of Bull Run

"Scots, follow me!" (Note: Also reported as "Come on, my brave Highlanders!")
— James Cameron, Union colonel of the American Civil War (21 July 1861), before being mortally wounded at the First Battle of Bull Run

"There is Jackson standing like a stone wall! Rally behind the Virginians. Let us determine to die here and we will conquer. Follow me."
— Barnard Elliott Bee Jr., Confederate general of the American Civil War (22 July 1861), before being mortally wounded at the First Battle of Bull Run. His last words gave rise to the nickname of Thomas J. "Stonewall" Jackson.

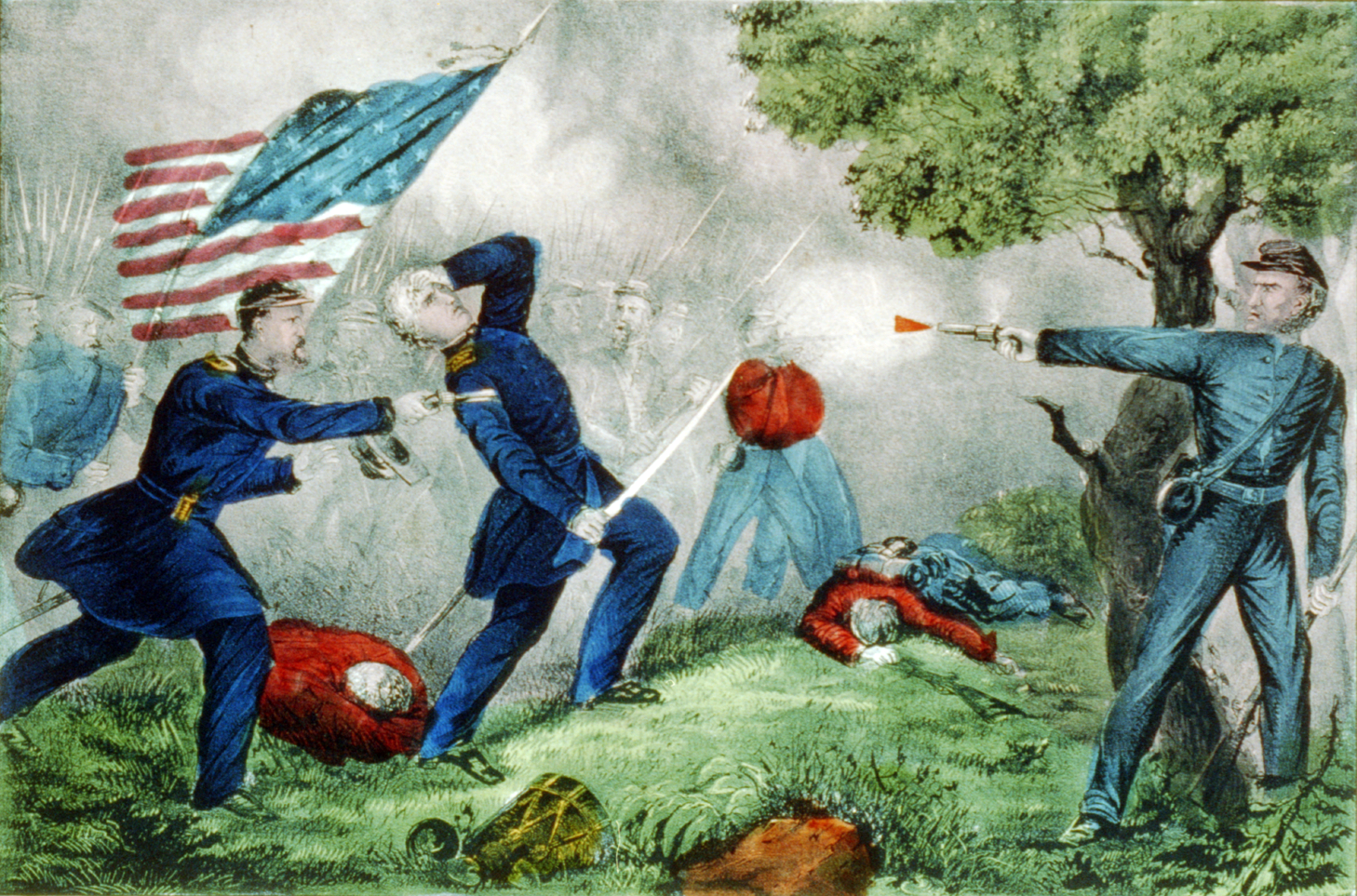
Death of Col Edward D. Baker: At the Battle of Balls Bluff near Leesburg Va. Oct. 21st 1861, by Currier and Ives.

"See, he falls."
— Edward Dickinson Baker, United States Senator and Union colonel of the American Civil War (21 October 1861), pointing to a Confederate horseman who had been struck by gunfire at the Battle of Ball's Bluff. Baker was then himself shot four times. He was the only sitting United States Senator ever killed in a military engagement.

"Good little wife." (Note: Also reported as "I have such sweet thoughts" and as "I have had wealth, rank and power, but if these were all I had, how wretched I should be! 'Rock of Ages cleft for me, Let me hide myself in Thee.'")
("Gutes Weibchen" or "Gutes Frauchen.")
— Albert, Prince Consort (14 December 1861), to his wife, Queen Victoria

"Doctor, I am going. Perhaps it is best."
— John Tyler, president of the United States (18 January 1862)

"I remember that little fellow who said, 'I love God!' Nothing that loves him shall perish. No, they shall not die. I shall meet them soon in heaven. Amen."
— Andrew Reed, English Congregational minister and hymnwriter (25 February 1862), pondering the fate of the souls of intellectually disabled persons

"Poor little boys!"
— Henry Thomas Buckle, English historian and author (29 May 1862)

"Charge Men! For God's sake charge!" (Note: Also reported as, "Forward my brave men!")
— Turner Ashby, Confederate cavalry commander of the American Civil War (6 June 1862), before being killed at Harrisonburg, Virginia

"There is but one reliance."
— Martin Van Buren, president of the United States (24 July 1862)

"I know how to deal with these people."
— Charles Lennox Richardson, English merchant (14 September 1862), prior to death in the Namamugi Incident

"Yes, yes, I'm dead—good-by!"
— Jesse L. Reno, Union general of the American Civil War (14 September 1862), mortally wounded at the Battle of South Mountain

"Tell McClellan that my last regret as a military man is that I did not die serving under him."
— George Dashiell Bayard, Union general of the American Civil War (14 December 1862), mortally wounded at the Battle of Fredericksburg

"I have fought a good fight, I have finished my course, I have kept the faith; henceforth there is laid up for me a crown, which God, the righteous Judge, will give me at that day. That is my testimony—write it down.—That is my testimony."
— Lyman Beecher, American Presbyterian minister (10 January 1863), quoting 2 Timothy 4:7-8

"I am dying, carry me to the rear."
— Hiram Gregory Berry, American politician and Union general of the American Civil War (3 May 1863), mortally wounded at the Battle of Chancellorsville

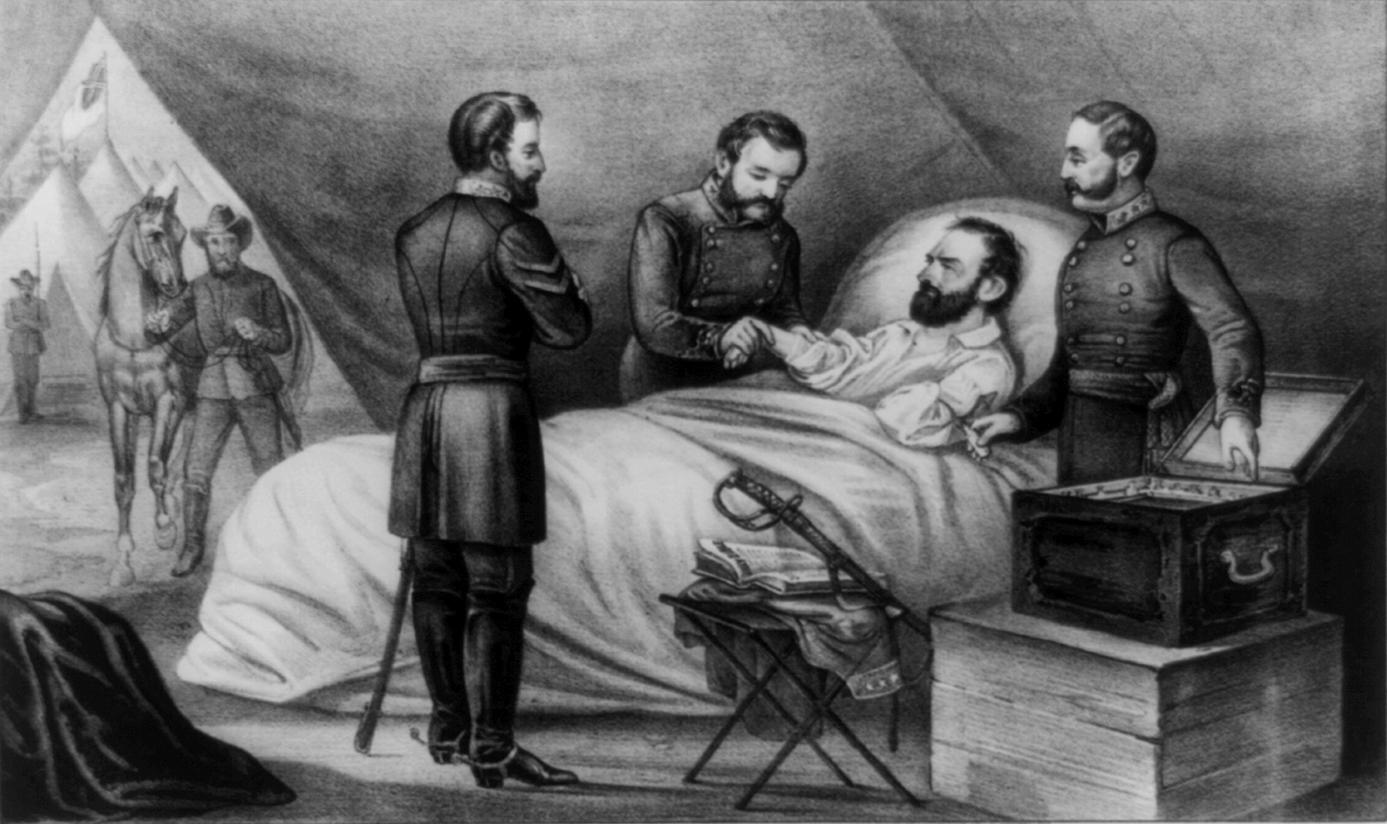
Death of Stonewall Jackson.

"Order A.P. Hill to prepare for action! Pass the infantry to the front rapidly! Tell Major Hawks.... Let us cross over the river and rest under the shade of the trees." (Note: Also reported as, "Let us go over the river, and sit under the refreshing shadow of the trees.")
— Stonewall Jackson, American and Confederate soldier and general of the American Civil War (10 May 1863), dying of pneumonia after being wounded by friendly fire

"Forward men forward for God's sake and drive those fellows out of those woods."
— John F. Reynolds, Union general of the American Civil War (1 July 1863), prior to being fatally shot at the Battle of Gettysburg

"Tell father that I died with my face to the enemy."
— Isaac E. Avery, Confederate officer of the American Civil War (3 July 1863), written on scrap of paper after being mortally wounded at the Battle of Gettysburg

"Tell my wife I am shot, but we fought like hell."
— William Barksdale, Confederate general of the American Civil War (3 July 1863), to a Union surgeon after being mortally wounded at the Battle of Gettysburg

"Give them the cold steel, boys." (Note: Also reported as, "Come on boys. Give them the cold steel!" and as "Say to General Hancock for me that I have done him and you all a grievous injury which I shall always regret" (referring to his friend, Union General Winfield Scott Hancock).)
— Lewis Armistead, Confederate brigadier general of the American Civil War (5 July 1863), prior to being mortally wounded at the Battle of Gettysburg

"Texas! Texas! Margaret."
— Sam Houston, American soldier and politician (26 July 1863), to his wife, Margaret Lea Houston (Note: Year of death incorrectly given by Marvin as 1862.)

"Sarah."
— William Lowndes Yancey, Confederate journalist, politician, orator and diplomat (27 July 1863), calling his wife's name

"Tell them I died game."
— Fred Lowry, Australian bushranger (30 August 1863), shot in the throat by police

"Tell my father I died right."
— Richard Rowland Kirkland, Confederate soldier (20 September 1863), mortally wounded at the Battle of Chickamauga

"Congestion. Stopped."
— Joseph Henry Green, English surgeon (13 December 1863), breathing with difficulty on his deathbed and then taking his own pulse

"Good night." (Note: Egbert mistakenly ascribes these words to Charles Dickens while describing the date and circumstances of Thackeray's death.)
— William Makepeace Thackeray, English novelist (24 December 1863), to his valet

"Dear little fellow—he is a beautiful boy."
— Thomas Starr King, American Universalist and Unitarian minister and orator (4 March 1864), when his young son was brought to see him

"Colonel, rally your men and advance as soon as possible."
— Lewis Benedict, American politician and Union colonel of the American Civil War (9 April 1864), before being killed at the Battle of Pleasant Hill

"Why, my man, I am ashamed of you, dodging that way. They couldn't hit an elephant at this distance. [...] All right, my man; go to your place." (Note: Reports that Sedgwick was shot as he was saying "They couldn't hit an elephant at this distance!" are apocryphal.)
— John Sedgwick, Union general of the American Civil War (9 May 1864), shortly before being shot in the head by a Confederate sharpshooter

"That is true glory. I will hear no more."
— Josiah Quincy III, Mayor of Boston and President of Harvard University (1 July 1864), hearing his daughter read to him about Lieutenant Colonel Joseph Bailey saving the Union fleet during the Red River Campaign (Note: Described by Egbert as "His last words in the interest of earthly affairs".)

"Lay me down, and save the flag!"
— James A. Mulligan, Union Army colonel of the American Civil War (26 July 1864), mortally wounded at the Second Battle of Kernstown

"Why should I not know you, Mary?"
— Park Benjamin Sr., American poet, journalist and editor (12 September 1864), when his wife asked him if he knew her

"I protest against this execution. It is absolute murder—brutal murder. I die in the service and defense of my country."
— John Yates Beall, Confederate privateer (24 February 1865), hanged as a spy by the Union during the American Civil War

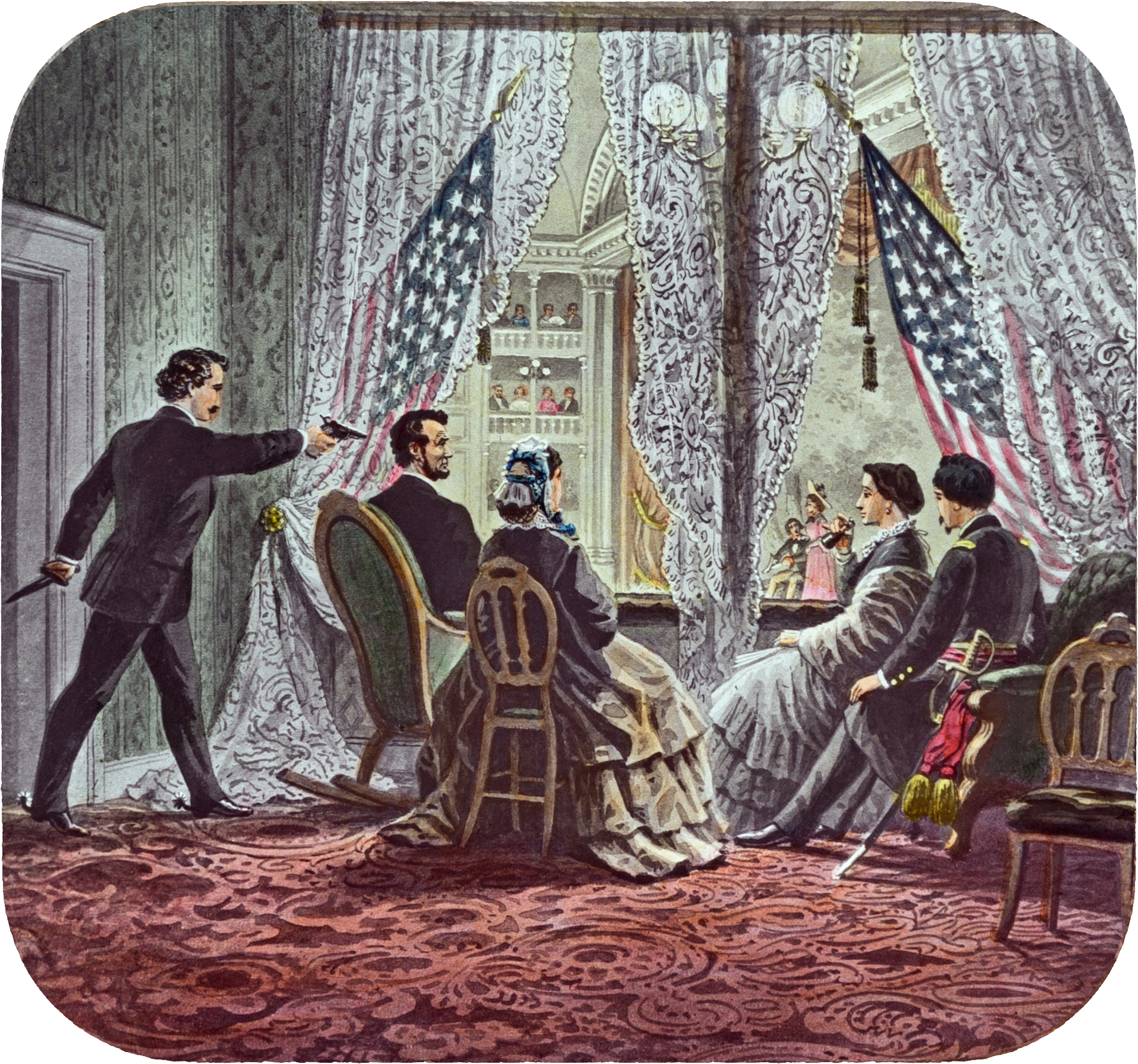
President Abraham Lincoln was assassinated by John Wilkes Booth, a Confederate nationalist, while watching a stage play. Lincoln had recently fought and won a civil war against the Confederate States.

"She won't think anything about it." (Note: While these were his last words, Lincoln's final utterance was laughter. As the President watched the play Our American Cousin, actor Harry Hawk delivered one of the best lines of the play: "Well, I guess I know enough to turn you inside out, old gal; you sockdologizing old man-trap!" Lincoln was laughing at this line when he was shot. At the moment of death some observers said his face seemed to relax into a smile. As he died his breathing grew quieter, his face more calm. According to some accounts, at his last drawn breath, on the morning after the assassination, he smiled broadly and then expired. Historians, most notably author Lee Davis, have emphasized Lincoln's peaceful appearance when and after he died: "It was the first time in four years, probably, that a peaceful expression crossed his face." Field wrote in a letter to The New York Times: "that there was 'no apparent suffering, no convulsive action, no rattling of the throat...[only] a mere cessation of breathing'... I had never seen upon the President's face an expression more genial and pleasing." The President's secretary, John Hay, saw "a look of unspeakable peace came upon his worn features".)
— Abraham Lincoln, president of the United States (15 April 1865), assuring his wife Mary that their friend Clara would not mind them holding hands, shortly before he was fatally shot from behind

"Tell mother, tell mother, I died for my country...useless...useless..."
— John Wilkes Booth, American actor and assassin of Abraham Lincoln (26 April 1865), after being fatally shot by Boston Corbett

"And now with my latest writing and utterance, and with what will be near my latest breath, I here repeat and would willingly proclaim my unmitigated hatred to yankee rule – to all political, social and business connections with Yankees, and the perfidious, malignant and vile Yankee race."
— Edmund Ruffin, Virginia planter and enslaver (18 June 1865), conclusion of final diary entry before suicide

"Please don't let me fall."
— Mary Surratt, American boarding house owner (7 July 1865), prior to execution by hanging after conviction for taking part in the conspiracy to assassinate Abraham Lincoln

"That's Article 98; now go on to the next."
— Henry John Temple, 3rd Viscount Palmerston, Prime Minister of the United Kingdom (18 October 1865), pondering diplomatic treaties

"This is too tight."
— Henry Wirz, Confederate States Army officer (10 November 1865), referring to his noose prior to execution for war crimes

"The Emperor said to me: 'I....'"
— Sergey Volkonsky, Russian major general and Decembrist (10 December 1865); he died mid-sentence as he was writing his memoirs

"Ah! my child, let us speak of Christ's love—the best, the highest love!"
— Fredrika Bremer, Swedish writer and feminist reformer (31 December 1865)

"Ah, Luisa, you always arrive just as I'm leaving."
— Massimo d'Azeglio, Italian statesman, novelist and painter (15 January 1866), seeing his estranged wife arrive at his bedside as he died

"By the Immortal God, I will not move."
— Thomas Love Peacock, English novelist and poet (23 January 1866), fatally burned while trying to save his library from a fire

"James, take good care of the horses."
— Winfield Scott, United States Army general (29 May 1866)

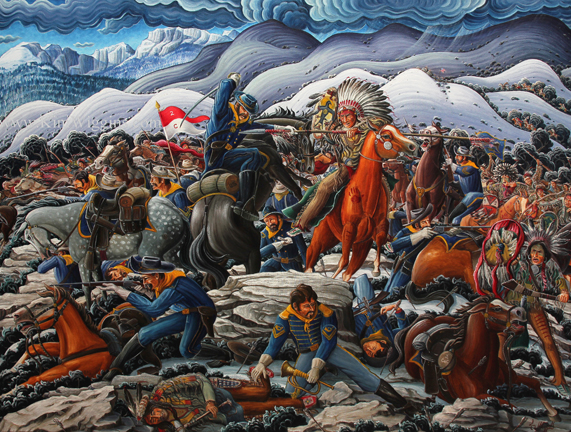
Kim Douglas Wiggins' study of the Fetterman Fight, early 21st century.

"Give me 80 men and I'll ride through the whole Sioux nation."
— William J. Fetterman, United States Army officer (21 December 1866), prior to death in the Fetterman Fight

"O man! O man!" (Note: Also reported as, "Poor Carlotta!" (his wife).)
("Hombre! Hombre!")
— Maximilian I of Mexico (19 June 1867), after being shot by firing squad

"Holy name!"
("Cré nom!")
— Charles Baudelaire, French poet (31 August 1867)

"Never mind, I shall soon drink of the river of Eternal Life."
— Henry Timrod, American and Confederate poet (7 October 1867), unable to swallow a spoonful of water

"Run for a Doctor."
— Alexander Roberts Dunn VC, Canadian British Army officer, Crimean War Victoria Cross recipient (25 January 1868), mortally wounded by gunshot under unclear circumstances during hunting expedition near Senafe

"I do not have to forgive my enemies. I have had them all shot."
— Ramón María Narváez, 1st Duke of Valencia, Spanish general and Prime Minister of Spain (23 April 1868)

"Gentlemen, do you see this hand? Does it tremble? I never hurt a hair of that girl's head." (Note: Also reported as, "Gentlemen, I did not harm a single hair on that fair lady's head" and as "You have such a nice clean rope, I ought to have washed my neck.")
— Tom Dula, former Confederate soldier (1 May 1868), prior to execution by hanging for the murder of Laura Foster

"I have been a great trouble."
— Kondō Isami, Japanese samurai, Tennen Rishin-ryū master, and Shinsengumi commander (17 May 1868), just before his execution

"Wish I had time for just one more bowl of chili." (Note: Also reported as, "Goodbye, friends. Adiós, compadres.")
— Kit Carson, American frontiersman (23 May 1868)

"Oh, Lord God Almighty, as thou wilt!" (Note: Also reported as, "Whatever the result may be, I shall carry to my grave the consciousness that at least I meant well for my country.")
— James Buchanan, president of the United States (1 June 1868)

"I'll bet that cat is here."
— Okita Sōji, Japanese samurai and Shinsengumi captain (19 July 1868), referencing his failure to kill a stray cat over previous days, as he died of tuberculosis

"I have my death wound, General. I am shot and dying... Yes, Good night... My poor mother."
— Fredrick Henry Beecher, United States Army lieutenant (September 1868), mortally wounded at the Battle of Beecher Island

"One thousand greetings to Balakirev." (Note: Also reported as, "Enfin, on va joue ma musique" ("They are finally going to play my music"), "Oh, Mere Recio, it is finished!", and as either "Ça m'est égal" ("It doesn't matter to me") or as "That is my signal" (after quoting Macbeth Act V, Scene 5, lines 24–28, from the "Tomorrow and tomorrow and tomorrow" soliloquy).)
— Hector Berlioz, French composer (8 March 1869)

"It is a great mystery, but I shall know all soon."
— George Peabody, American financier and philanthropist (4 November 1869)

== 1870–1879 ==
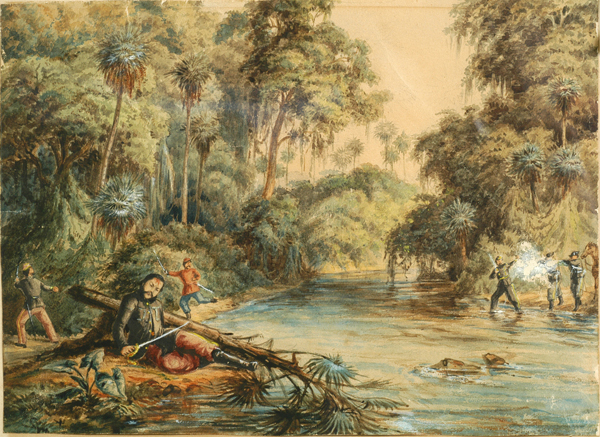
Death of Francisco Solano López.

"I die for my country." (Note: Sometimes incorrectly stated to have been "I die with my country" ("Muero con mi patria.").)
("Muero por mi patria.")
— Francisco Solano López, 2nd president of Paraguay (1 March 1870), after his last stand in the Battle of Cerro Corá

"Is not this dying with true courage and true greatness?"
— Marie-Caroline of Bourbon-Two Sicilies, Duchess of Berry (16 April 1870)

"Yes. On the ground."
— Charles Dickens, English novelist (9 June 1870), to his sister-in-law Georgina Hogarth, who had suggested he lie down after he suffered a stroke

"Tell Hill he must come up! Strike the tent!" (Note: These reported last words have been questioned due to conflicting accounts and Lee's aphasia at the time of his death.)
— Robert E. Lee, United States and Confederate States soldier and general (12 October 1870)

"All mortal!"
("¡Todo mortal!")
— Gustavo Adolfo Bécquer, Spanish Romanticist poet and writer (22 December 1870), in a delirium from fever

"Will you tell the Archdeacon?– will you move a vote of thanks for his kindness in performing the ceremony?"
— Henry Alford, English churchman (12 January 1871), requesting that the Archdeacon participate in his funeral

"I want to go away."
— Alice Cary, American poet (12 February 1871)

"God bless you all!"
— James Osgood Andrew, American bishop of the Methodist Episcopal Church, South (2 March 1871)

"I am positioned between Heaven and Earth and feel like I am surrounded by nothing but light. Kiss me one last time! If I have failed in my duties toward you, then forgive me."
("Jag befinner mig mellan himmel och jord och tycker mig omgiven av idel ljus. Kyss mig ännu em sista gång! Om jag brustit i mina plikter mot dig, så förlåt mig.")
— Lovisa, Queen of Sweden and Norway (30 March 1871)

"Why, certainly, certainly!"
— Edward Thompson Taylor, American Methodist minister (6 April 1871), when a friend asked him if Jesus was precious

"The knowledge of the love of God—the blessing of God Almighty, the Father, the Son and the Holy Ghost be amongst you—amongst us—and remain with us forever."
— Frederick Denison Maurice, English Anglican theologian and author (1 April 1872)

"Nothing, only 'love one another'."
— William H. Seward, United States Secretary of State (10 October 1872), when asked if he had any final words

"You to me, Federico?"
— Agustín Morales, president of Bolivia (27 November 1872), speaking to Federico La Faye before being shot by the latter.

"I live."
("Minä elän")
— Aleksis Kivi, Finnish author and poet (31 December 1872)

"We were not cowards at Sedan, were we?"
("N'est-ce pas, Henri, que nous n'avons pas été lâches à Sedan?")
— Napoleon III, Emperor of the French (9 January 1873), speaking to his doctor, Henri Conneau

"Stand up for Jesus in all circumstances."
— Thomas Guthrie, Scottish divine and philanthropist (24 February 1873)

"Build me a hut to die in. I am going home."
— David Livingstone, Scottish physician, explorer and Christian missionary (1 May 1873)

"There is no such thing as sudden death to a Christian."
— Samuel Wilberforce, Anglican bishop (19 July 1873)

"The play is finished."
("Le jeu est fini.")
— Louis Agassiz, Swiss-American biologist and geologist (14 December 1873)

"Linen, doctor? You speak of linen? Do you know what linen is? The linen of the peasant, of the worker? Linen is a great thing. I want to make a book of it."
— Jules Michelet, French historian (9 February 1874), rambling before his death

"I love her—I love you all."
— John Bachman, American Lutheran minister, social activist and naturalist (24 February 1874), referring to a relative

"The nourishment is palatable."
— Millard Fillmore, president of the United States (8 March 1874), referring to soup he had eaten

"Sit down."
— Charles Sumner, American statesman and United States Senator (11 March 1874), to Samuel Hooper, his former father-in-law

"Thou knowest, O Lord, the secrets of our hearts; shut not Thy merciful ears to our prayer, but spare us, O Lord most holy, O God most mighty, O holy and merciful Saviour, Thou most worthy Judge Eternal, suffer us not at our last hour, from any pains of death, to fall from Thee."
— Charles Kingsley, English priest, university professor and author (23 January 1875), quoting from the Burial Service in the Book of Common Prayer

"This is the happiest day I have ever experienced on earth. I shall soon be where the wicked cease from troubling and the weary are at rest."
— Edward Sugden, 1st Baron St Leonards, British lawyer, judge and politician (29 January 1875)

"I am in a cold sweat. Is it the sweat of death? How are you going to tell my father?"
— Georges Bizet, French composer (3 June 1875)

"Oh, do not cry. Be good children, and we shall meet in heaven." (Note: Conradt comments on the similarity to Andrew Jackson's last words (ibid.).)
— Andrew Johnson, president of the United States (31 July 1875)

"Don't ask me how I am! I understand nothing more."
— Hans Christian Andersen, Danish children's author (4 August 1875)

"God does not die!"
— Gabriel García Moreno, President of Ecuador (6 August 1875)

"I might have lived another year if I had not caught this cold, but I am satisfied to go now. I am eighty-four years old—long past the allotted time of man—and at my age, life becomes a burden."
— William Backhouse Astor Sr., American business magnate (24 November 1875)

"I am so happy."
("Jag är så lycklig.")
— Josephine, Queen of Sweden and Norway (7 June 1876)

"Farewell, I am going to die. Goodbye Lina, goodbye Maurice, goodbye Lolo, good ..." (Note: Also reported as, "Laissez la verdure.")
— George Sand, French novelist (8 June 1876)

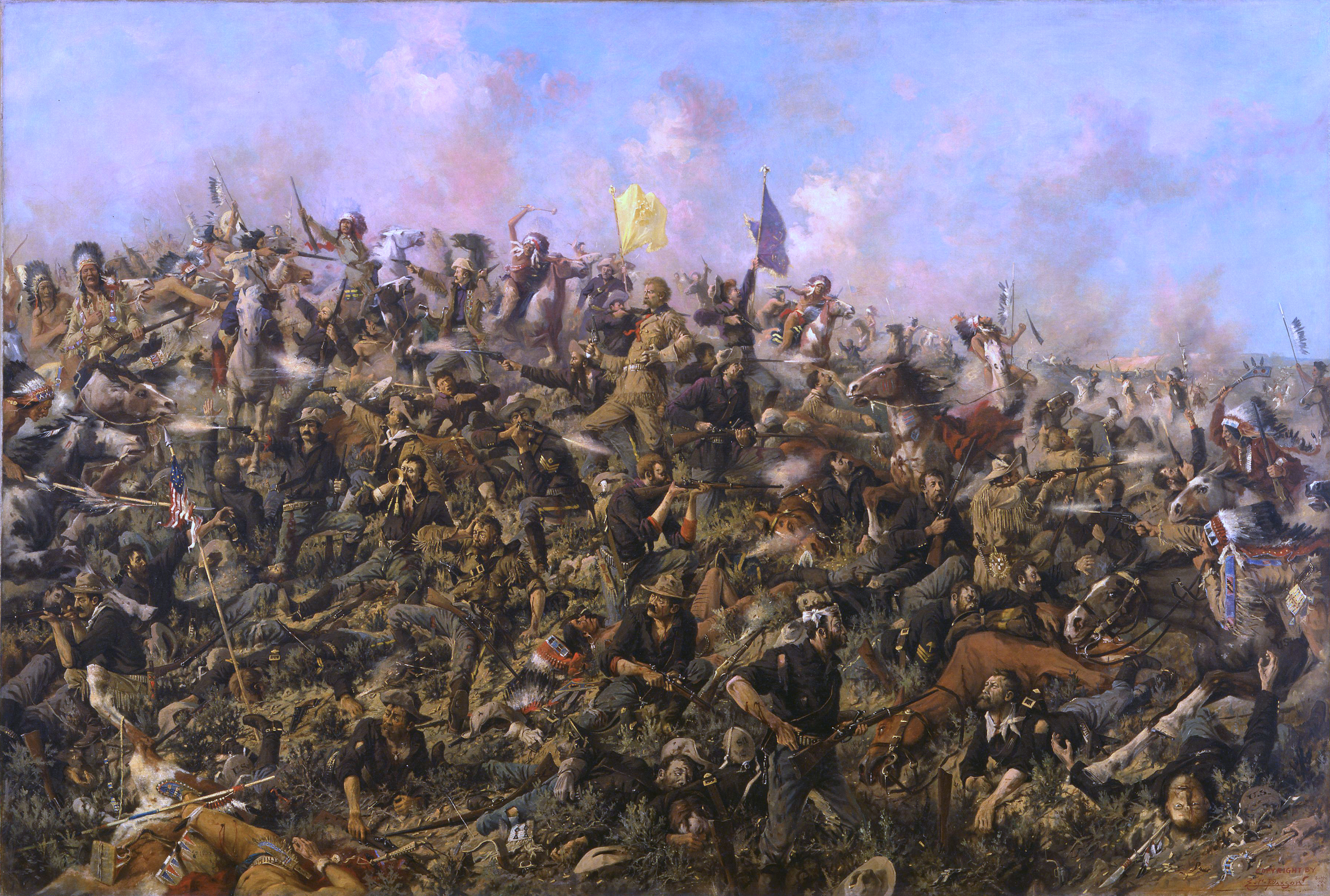
Custer's Last Stand by Edgar Samuel Paxson.

"Orderly, I want you to take a message to Colonel Benteen. Ride as fast as you can and tell him to hurry. Tell him it's a big village and I want him to be quick, and to bring the ammunition packs." (Note: Also reported as, "Custer's luck! The biggest Indian Village on the Continent!")
— George Armstrong Custer, United States Army officer (25 June 1876), to Sergeant Charles Windolph prior to the Battle of the Little Bighorn

"Where's the General?"
— Boston Custer, United States Army civilian contractor, brother of George Armstrong Custer and Thomas Custer (25 June 1876), asking about the location of his brother George prior to his death at the Battle of the Little Bighorn

"Jesus! precious Saviour!"
— George David Cummins, American Anglican bishop, founder of the Reformed Episcopal Church (26 June 1876)

"Farewell, the martyrdom is no more!"
("Adeus, acabou o martírio!")
— Inocêncio Francisco da Silva, Portuguese bibliographer (27 June 1876)

"Thanks be to God."
("Graças a Deus.")
— João Carlos de Saldanha Oliveira e Daun, 1st Duke of Saldanha, Portuguese statesman (18 November 1876)

"Let me have my own fidgets."
— Walter Bagehot, British journalist, businessman and essayist (24 March 1877), declining help rearranging his pillows

"Good morning."
— William Augustus Muhlenberg, American Episcopal clergyman and educator (8 April 1877), to a friend who had entered the room

"I am ill — very ill, I shall not recover."
— John Lothrop Motley, American author and diplomat (29 May 1877)

"Joseph! Joseph! Joseph!" (Note: Also reported as, "Amen.")
— Brigham Young, American religious leader and politician (29 August 1877), referring to Joseph Smith

"I'm fine here now"
("もう、ここらでよか")
— Takamori Saigo, Japanese general (24 September 1877), a word of surrender for Satsuma Rebellion.

"Good-bye Mary, good-bye forever."
— Edwin Adams, American stage actor (28 October 1877), to his wife

"I am dying, I am worn out."
— Oliver P. Morton, Governor of Indiana and United States Senator (1 November 1877)

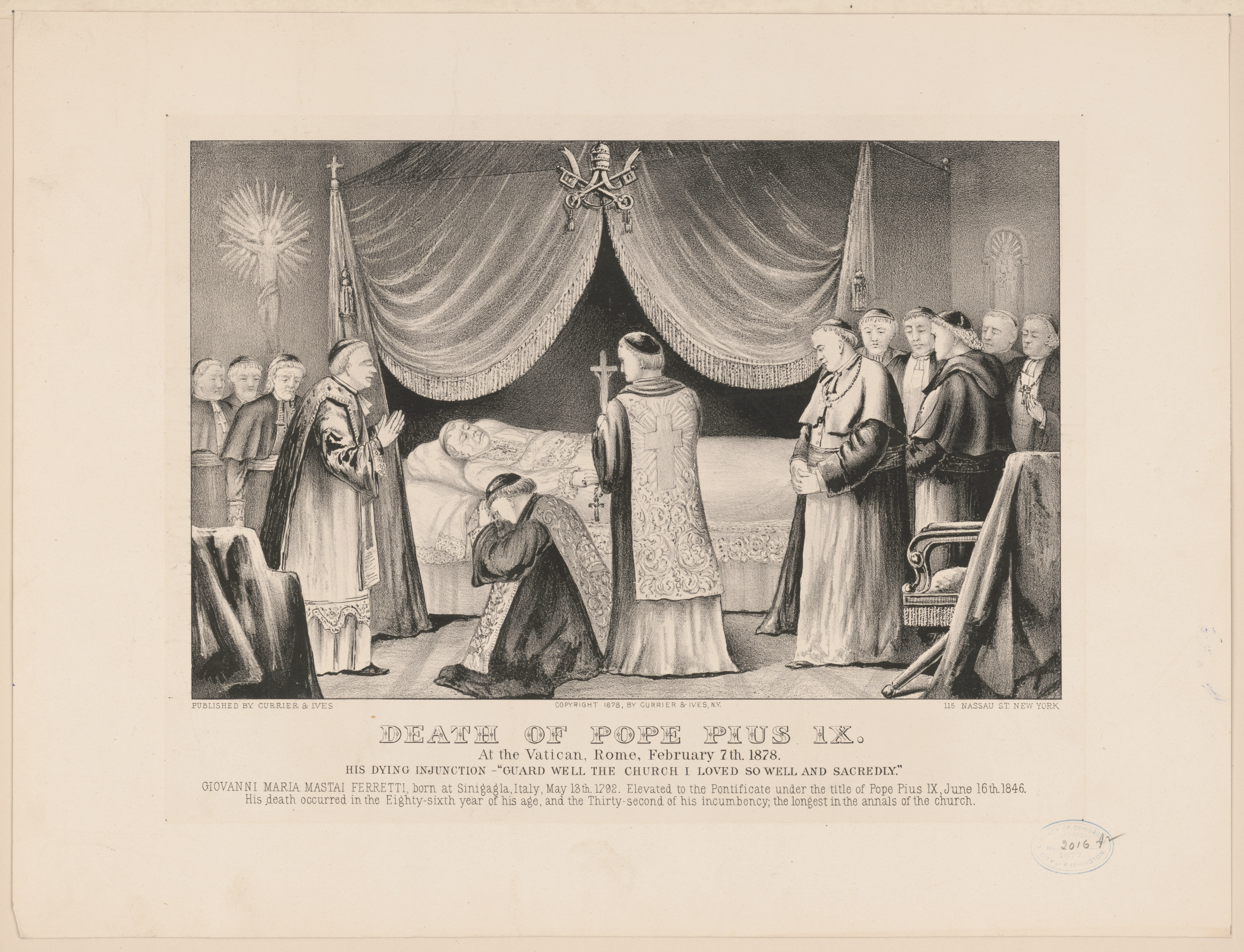
Death of Pope Pius IX.

"Guard the Church I loved so well and sacredly."
— Pope Pius IX (7 February 1878)

"This time it will serve me for the voyage from which there is no return, the voyage of eternity."
— Claude Bernard, French physiologist (10 February 1878), when a cover was placed to warm his feet

"I hope to be in Phil. in about ten days. I am stronger than for yrs. but take no new responsibilities."
— Catharine Beecher, American educator (12 May 1878); last written words

"Whose house is this? What street are we in? Why did you bring me here? Would you like to see Miss Fairchild?"
— William Cullen Bryant, American poet, journalist and editor (12 June 1878). He had fallen and hit his head on the sidewalk; Miss Fairchild was his niece.

"My work is done. The pins of the tabernacle are taken out."
— Charles Hodge, American Presbyterian theologian (19 June 1878)

"Let me go... The world is bobbing around me."
— Sam Bass, American train robber and outlaw (21 July 1878), mortally wounded in gun battle with Texas Rangers

"How easy — how easy — how easy to glide from work here to the work ——"
— John Howard Raymond, American educator (14 August 1878)

"I will sleep quietly now."
— Princess Alice of the United Kingdom, daughter of Queen Victoria (14 December 1878)

"I want, oh, you know what I mean, the stuff of life."
— Bayard Taylor, American poet, literary critic, translator, travel author and diplomat (19 December 1878)

"Surrender? Your grandmother should surrender, you bastard!"
("¿Rendirme? ¡Que se rinda su abuela, carajo!")
— Eduardo Abaroa, Bolivian hero of the War of the Pacific (23 March 1879), responding to Chilean forces asking him to surrender

"He."
— Frances Ridley Havergal, English religious poet and hymnwriter (3 June 1879), possibly trying to say, "He died for me."

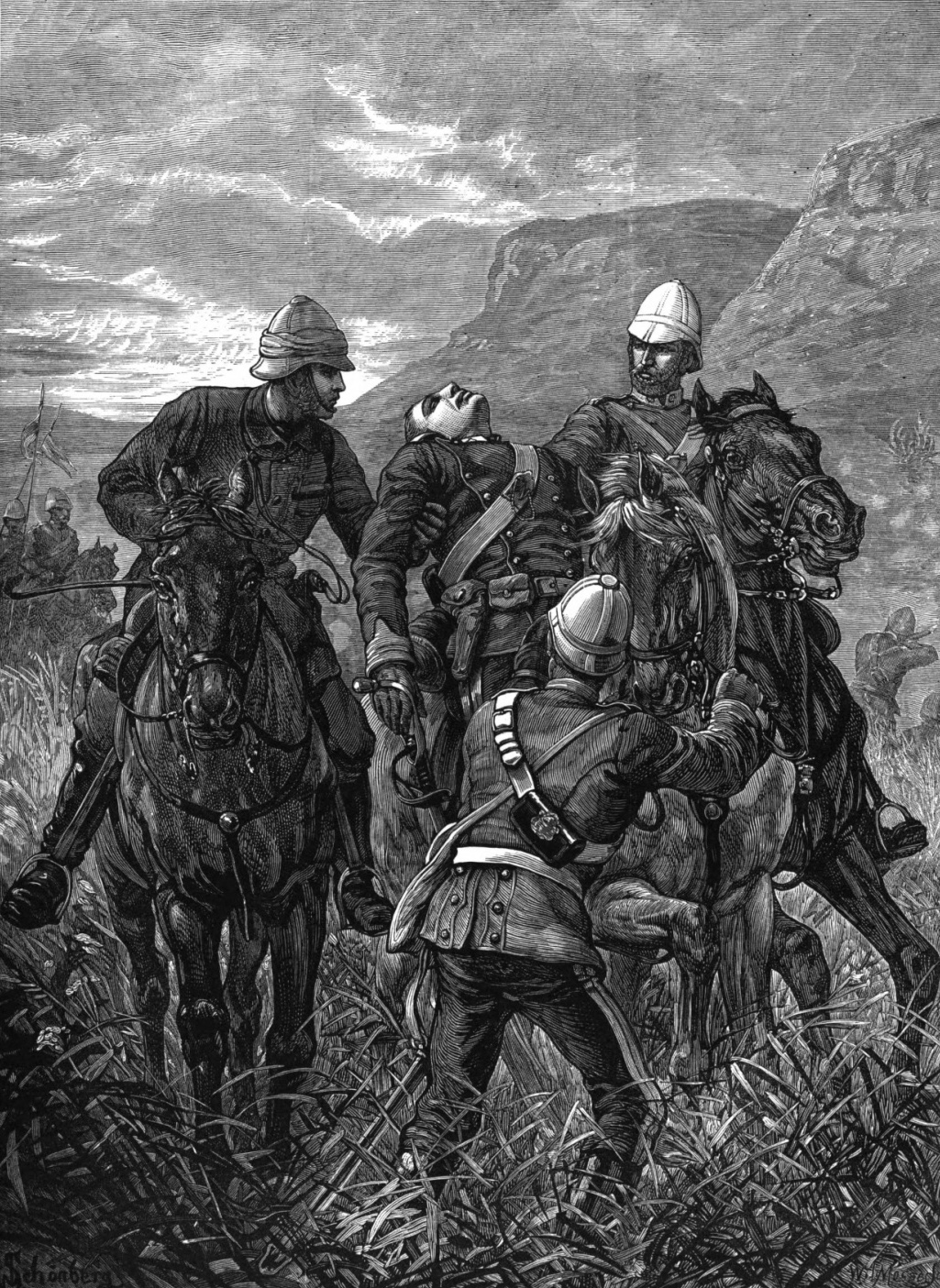
Death of Lieutenant Frith.

"Oh I'm shot."
— Frederick John Cokayne Frith, Scottish officer in the British Army (5 June 1879), mortally wounded during the Zungeni Mountain skirmish

"Lord, have mercy upon me."
— Kate Webster, Irish murderer (29 July 1879), prior to execution by hanging

== 1880–1889 ==
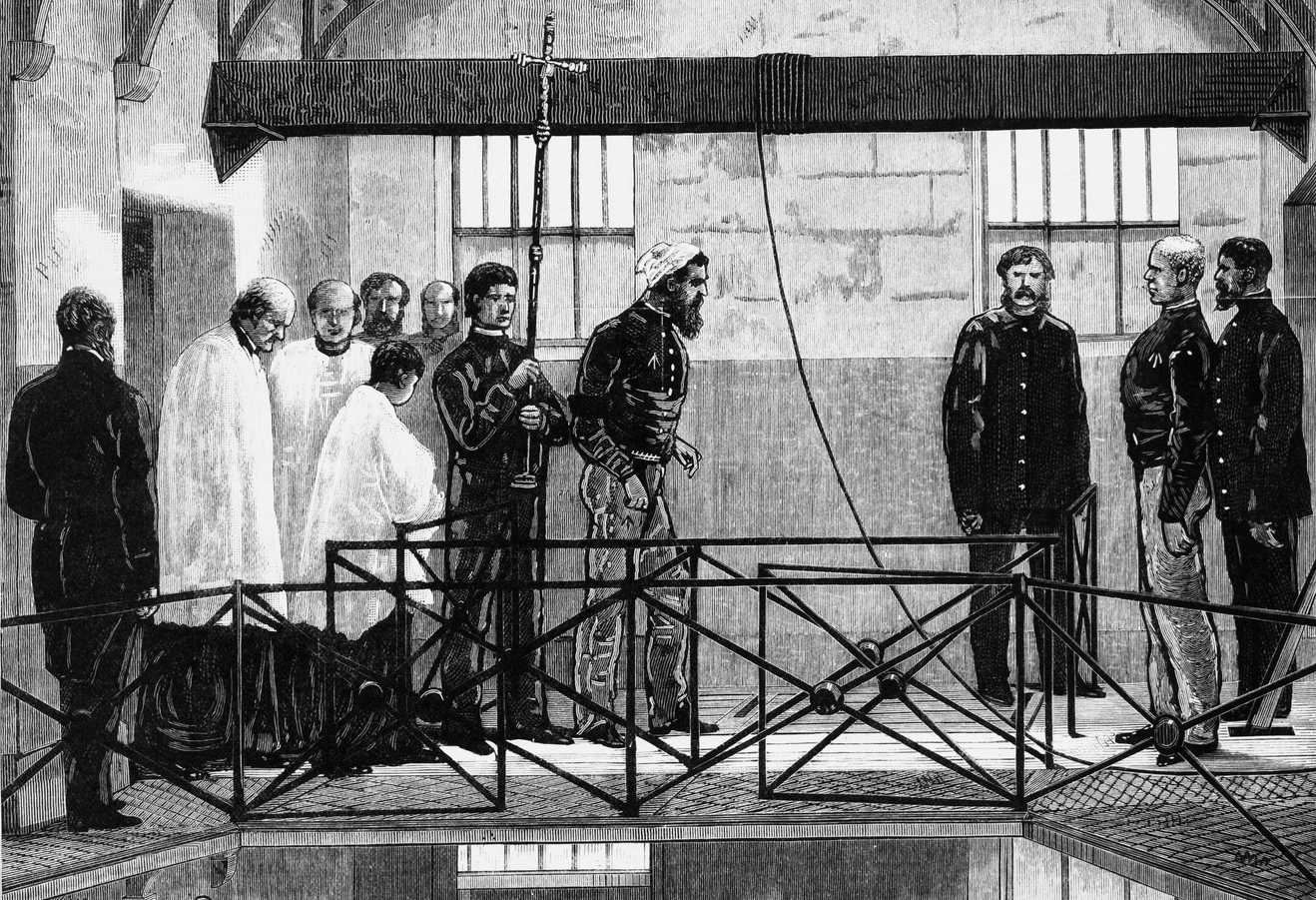
Ned Kelly at the gallows

"I suppose it had to come to this. Such is life."
— Ned Kelly, Australian bushranger and convicted police murderer (11 November 1880), prior to execution by hanging

"Tell them I have a great pain in my left side."
— George Eliot, English novelist (22 December 1880)

"I wish...I wish..."
— Charlie Bowdre, American cowboy and outlaw, associate of Billy the Kid (23 December 1880), shot dead in an ambush

"So this is death ... well ... " (Note: Also reported as, "I am very ill. Is it not strange that these people should have chosen the very oldest man in all Britain to make suffer in this way?" (when James Anthony Froude said they might have reasons) "Yes, it would be rash to say that they have no reasons.")
— Thomas Carlyle, Scottish philosopher and author (5 February 1881)

"I am sweeping through the gates, washed in the blood of the Lamb." (Note: Also reported as, "More quickly—inside—carry me to the palace—there—to die", "Quick—home—take me to the palace—there—to die", and as "Home to die—It's cold.")
— Alexander II of Russia (13 March [O.S. 1 March] 1881), bleeding to death after being wounded by nihilist bomb

"No, it is better not. She will only ask me to take a message to Albert."
— Benjamin Disraeli, Prime Minister of the United Kingdom (19 April 1881), declining a visit from Queen Victoria

"Relieved to hear that you feel better. I had a very bad night—am now stronger. Your poor Louis."
— Ludwig von Benedek, Austrian general (27 April 1881), writing to his wife

"Who is it? Who is it?" (Note: It is also claimed he said "What are those men doing out there, Don Pedro?" (¿Qué hacen esos hombres ahí fuera, don Pedro?").)
("¿Quién es? ¿Quién es?")
— Billy the Kid, American outlaw and gunfighter (14 July 1881), entering a dark bedroom whereupon sheriff Pat Garrett shot him after recognizing his voice

"I wish Vaughan to preach my funeral sermon, because he has known me longest."
— Arthur Penrhyn Stanley, FRS, English Anglican priest and ecclesiastical historian (18 July 1881); final recorded words

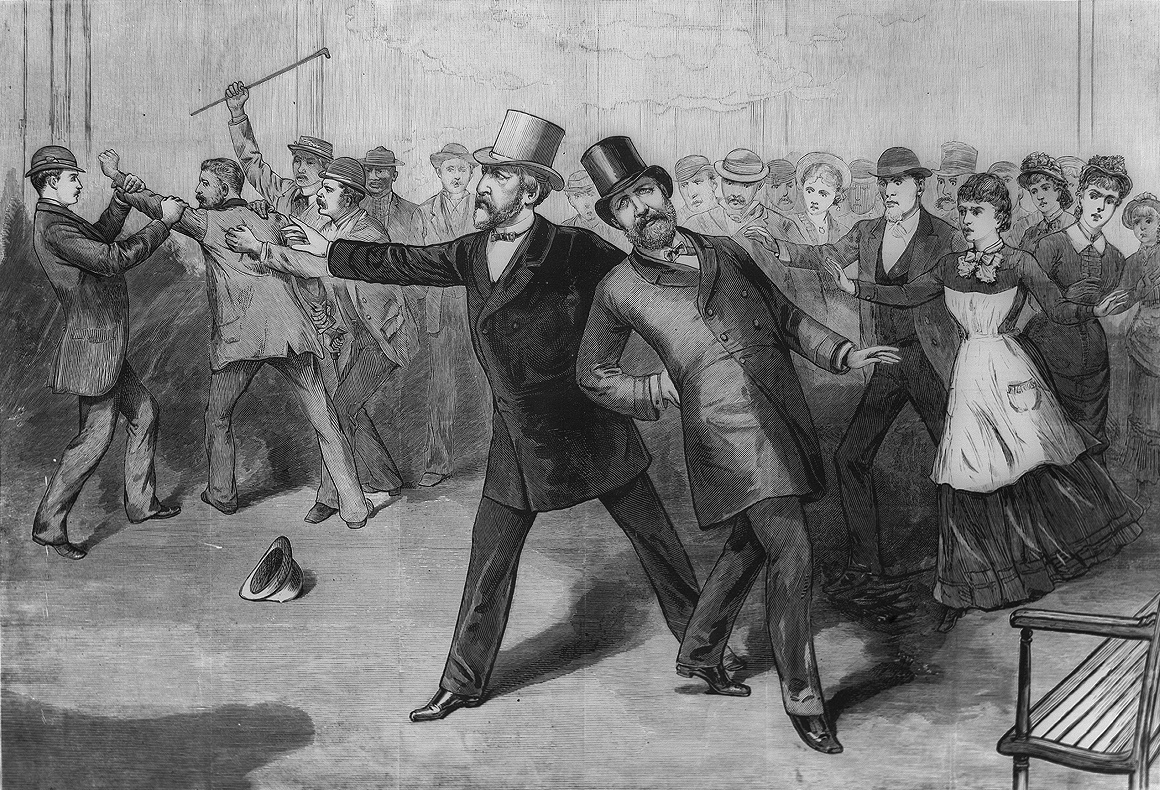
James A. Garfield, right after being shot by Charles J. Guiteau

"Oh, Swaim, this terrible pain. Press your hand on it. Oh, Swaim. Oh, Swaim, can't you stop this?" (Note: Also reported as, "The people my trust.")
— James A. Garfield, president of the United States (19 September 1881), to General David G. Swaim

"I can't see a damned thing."
— Morgan Earp, American lawman (18 March 1882), to his brother Wyatt; the brothers had each promised to describe to the other what he saw at the moment of death

"Now I know that I must be very ill, since you have been sent for."
— Henry Wadsworth Longfellow, American poet (24 March 1882), to his sister

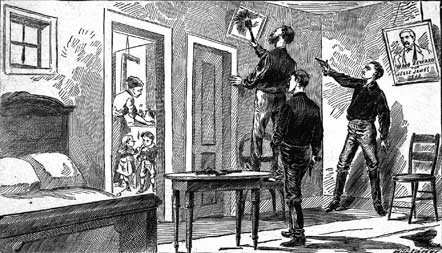
Assassination of Jesse James.

"That picture is awful dusty."
— Jesse James, American outlaw (3 April 1882), examining a picture on his wall before being murdered by Robert Ford

"Then you really think I am dying? At last you think so. But I was right from the first." (Note: Also reported as, "I think I shall die to-night.")
— Dante Gabriel Rossetti, English poet, translator and artist (9 April 1882)

"I am not in the least afraid to die."
— Charles Darwin, English naturalist and evolutionary (19 April 1882)

"O, that beautiful boy!"
— Ralph Waldo Emerson, American author, philosopher and transcendentalist (27 April 1882)

"As I stand here today and see what the Institute is, what it has already accomplished, and what it is at present doing, I call to mind the beginnings of science. I remember that one hundred and fifty years ago Stephen Hales published a pamphlet on the subject of illuminating gas, in which he stated that his researchers had demonstrated that 128 grains of bituminous coal —" (Note: Also reported as, "My memory goes back one hundred and fifty years.")
— William Barton Rogers, founder and first president of the Massachusetts Institute of Technology (30 May 1882), while giving a commencement address

"Glory hallelujah! I am going to the Lordy! I come! Ready! Go!"
— Charles J. Guiteau, assassin of President James A. Garfield (30 June 1882), at the conclusion of reading his poem "I am Going to the Lordy" prior to his hanging

"My God!"
— Edward Bouverie Pusey, English churchman, Regius Professor of Hebrew at the University of Oxford (16 September 1882)

"I want to go home."
— Thurlow Weed, American newspaper publisher and politician (22 November 1882)

"Viva Italia!"
— Guglielmo Oberdan, Italian irredentist (20 December 1882), executed at Trieste after a failed attempt to assassinate Austrian Emperor Franz Joseph

"I should like to record the thoughts of a dying man for the benefit of science, but it is impossible." (Note: Also reported as, "Tell the doctors it is impossible for me to record the words of a dying man. It would be interesting to do so, but I cannot. My time has come. I hope others will carry on my work.")
— George Miller Beard, American neurologist (23 January 1883)

"I feel very badly." (Note: Also reported as, "Love -- Tragedy" (the last words Wagner wrote on a score).)
("Mir ist sehr schlecht.")
— Richard Wagner, German composer (13 February 1883)

"Go on, get out! Last words are for fools who haven't said enough!"
("Hinaus! Letzte Worte sind für Narren, die noch nicht genug gesagt haben.")
— Karl Marx, political theorist (14 March 1883), when asked by his housekeeper about his last words

"Lord, receive my spirit."
— William Farr, British epidemiologist (14 April 1883)

"Amazing, amazing glory! I am having Paul's understanding."
— Charles Reade, English novelist and dramatist (11 April 1884), referring to 2 Corinthians 12:1-4, which he had been discussing with a relative

"How interesting this all is! It will be a new experience."
— Thomas Gold Appleton, American writer, artist and art patron, brother-in-law of Henry Wadsworth Longfellow (17 April 1884)

"What I require is warmth—will it never come?"
— Judah P. Benjamin, American and Confederate politician and English barrister after the American Civil War (6 May 1884), in a letter

"We shall go out together."
— Marie Bashkirtseff, Russian artist and diarist (31 October 1884), looking at a candle beside her deathbed

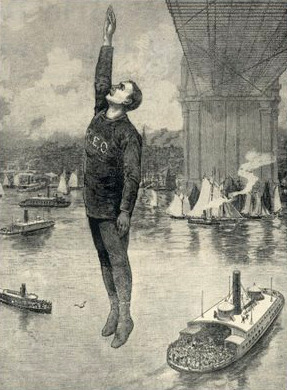
Robert Emmet Odlum's fatal leap from the Brooklyn Bridge.

"Am I spitting blood?"
— Robert Emmet Odlum, American swimming instructor (19 May 1885), after being fatally injured in dive off Brooklyn Bridge; a friend falsely reassured him that the fluid was only brandy

"This is the fight of day and night. I see black light." (Note: Also reported as, "C'est ici le combat du jour et de la nuit.")
("En moi c'est le combat du jour et de la nuit.")
— Victor Hugo, French novelist (22 May 1885)

"Water." (Note: Also reported as, "I want nobody distressed on my account.")
— Ulysses S. Grant, president of the United States (23 July 1885), when asked if he wanted anything while dying of throat cancer

"Thank God! Thank Heaven!"
— Moses Montefiore, FRS, British financier, banker and philanthropist (28 July 1885), dying at age 100

"It doesn't seem to go!"
— Emil Zsigmondy, Austrian mountain climber (6 August 1885), referring to route on south face of the Meije prior to falling to his death

"My exit is the result of too many entrées."
— Richard Monckton Milnes, 1st Baron Houghton, FRS, English poet and politician (11 August 1885)

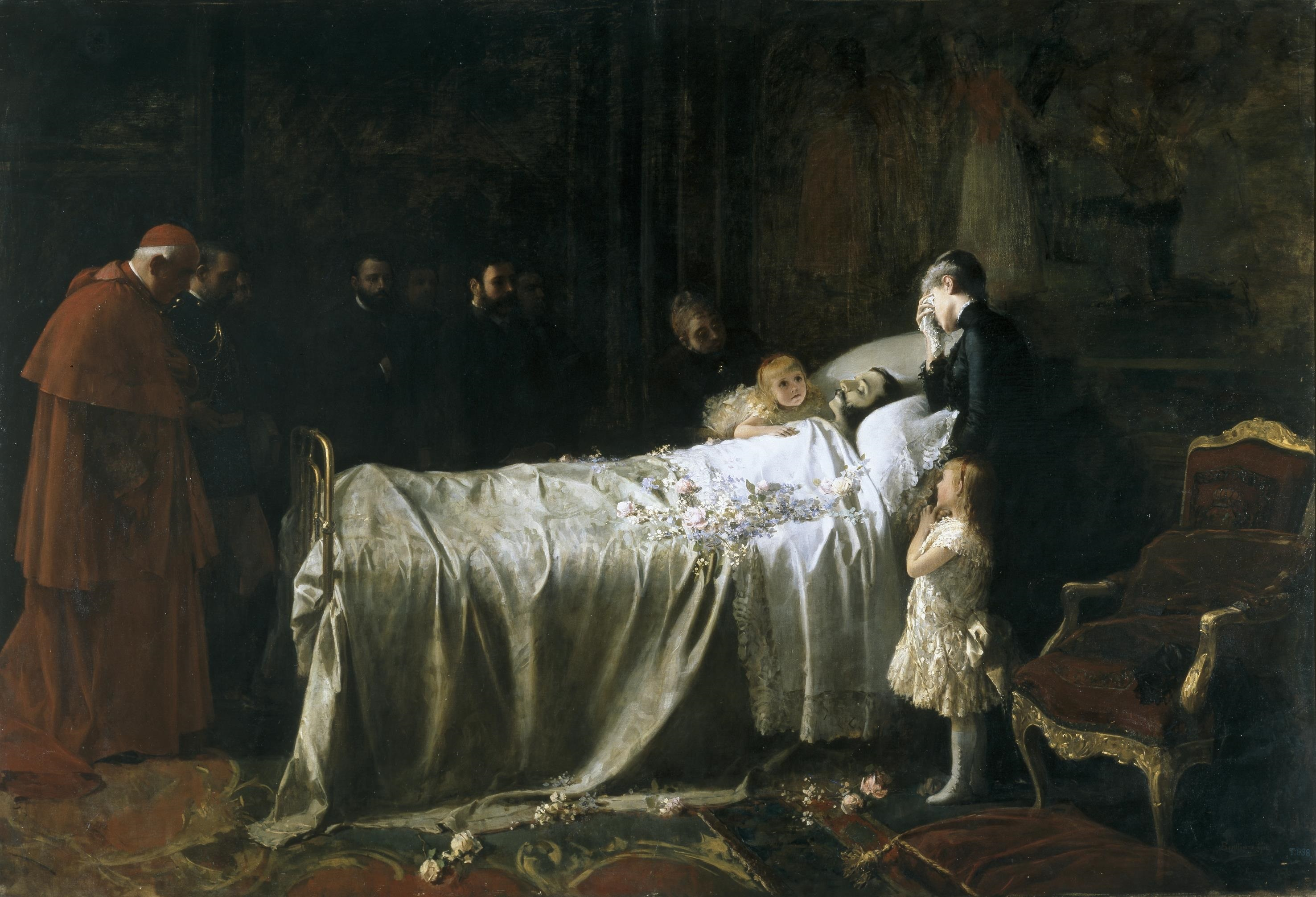
Death of Alfonso XII.

"I don't deserve to be cared for as you have cared for me. I know that when I have gone you will care for Spain as I have myself."
— Alfonso XII, King of Spain (25 November 1885)

"At rest at last. Now I am free from pain."
— Thomas A. Hendricks, Vice President of the United States (25 November 1885)

"I have had no real gratification or enjoyment of any sort more than my neighbor on the next block who is worth only half a million."
— William Henry Vanderbilt, American multimillionaire (8 December 1885)

"Young man, keep your record—"
— John Bartholomew Gough, American temperance orator (18 February 1886). The inaudible final word may have been "clean".

"I must go in, for the fog is rising. (when offered a drink of water) Oh, is that all it is?"
— Emily Dickinson, American poet (15 May 1886)

"Water."
— Samuel J. Tilden, American politician (4 August 1886), suffering from thirst

"Now comes the mystery." (Note: Also reported as, "Well, high enough to hit you, doctor" (when his physician asked how high he could raise his arm), "Going out into life–that is dying" and "You were saying that I could not recover.")
— Henry Ward Beecher, American clergyman (8 March 1887)

"Damn. This is funny."
— Doc Holliday, American gambler and gunfighter (8 November 1887), after a nurse refused him a whiskey

"Hurrah for anarchy!"
— George Engel, German-born American labor union activist (11 November 1887), prior to hanging after Haymarket affair

"This is the happiest moment of my life!"
— Adolph Fischer, German-born American labor union activist and anarchist (11 November 1887), prior to hanging after Haymarket affair

"Will I be allowed to speak, O men of America? Let me speak, Sheriff Matson! Let the voice of the people be heard! O—"
— Albert Parsons, American anarchist leader (11 November 1887), during hanging after Haymarket affair; interrupted by opening of gallows trapdoor

"I did not answer the letters of my friends because I could not write, as no sooner did I take a pen in my hand than I felt as if I was dying."
— Edward Lear, English nonsense poet (29 January 1888)

"I am going up. Come with me."
— Amos Bronson Alcott, American teacher, writer, philosopher and reformer (4 March 1888), to his daughter, Louisa May Alcott

"Is it not meningitis?"
— Louisa May Alcott, American novelist (6 March 1888)

"Give me a large cup of tea."
— John George Wood, English writer and populariser of natural history (3 March 1889)

"Well! God's will be done. He knows best. My work, with all its faults and failures, is in His hands, and before Easter I shall see my Saviour."
— Father Damien, SS.CC., Belgian Roman Catholic priest, minister to people with leprosy in the Hawaiian Kingdom (15 April 1889)

"I am so happy, so happy."
— Gerard Manley Hopkins SJ, English poet and priest (8 June 1889)

"Stop your fooling, fellows."
— James Averell, American businessman (20 July 1889), to the cattlemen who lynched him along with his wife, Ellen Watson

"I see such things as you can not dream of." (Note: Also reported as, "I am seeing things that you know nothing of.")
— William Allingham, Irish poet, diarist and editor (18 November 1889)

"Pray, excuse me."
— Jefferson Davis, President of the Confederate States of America (6 December 1889)

== 1890–1900 ==
"A little while and I will be gone from among you. Whither I cannot tell. From nowhere we came, into nowhere we go. What is life? It is a flash of a firefly in the night. It is the breath of a buffalo in the wintertime. It is the little shadow which runs across the grass and loses itself in the sunset."
— Crowfoot, Siksika Nation chief (25 April 1890)

"The sadness will last forever."
("La tristesse durera toujours.")
— Vincent van Gogh, Dutch painter (29 July 1890), to his brother sometime before dying of (presumably) a self-inflicted gunshot wound

"Oh Puss, chloroform—ether—or I am a dead man."
— Richard Francis Burton, British polymath (20 October 1890), to his wife, Isabel Burton

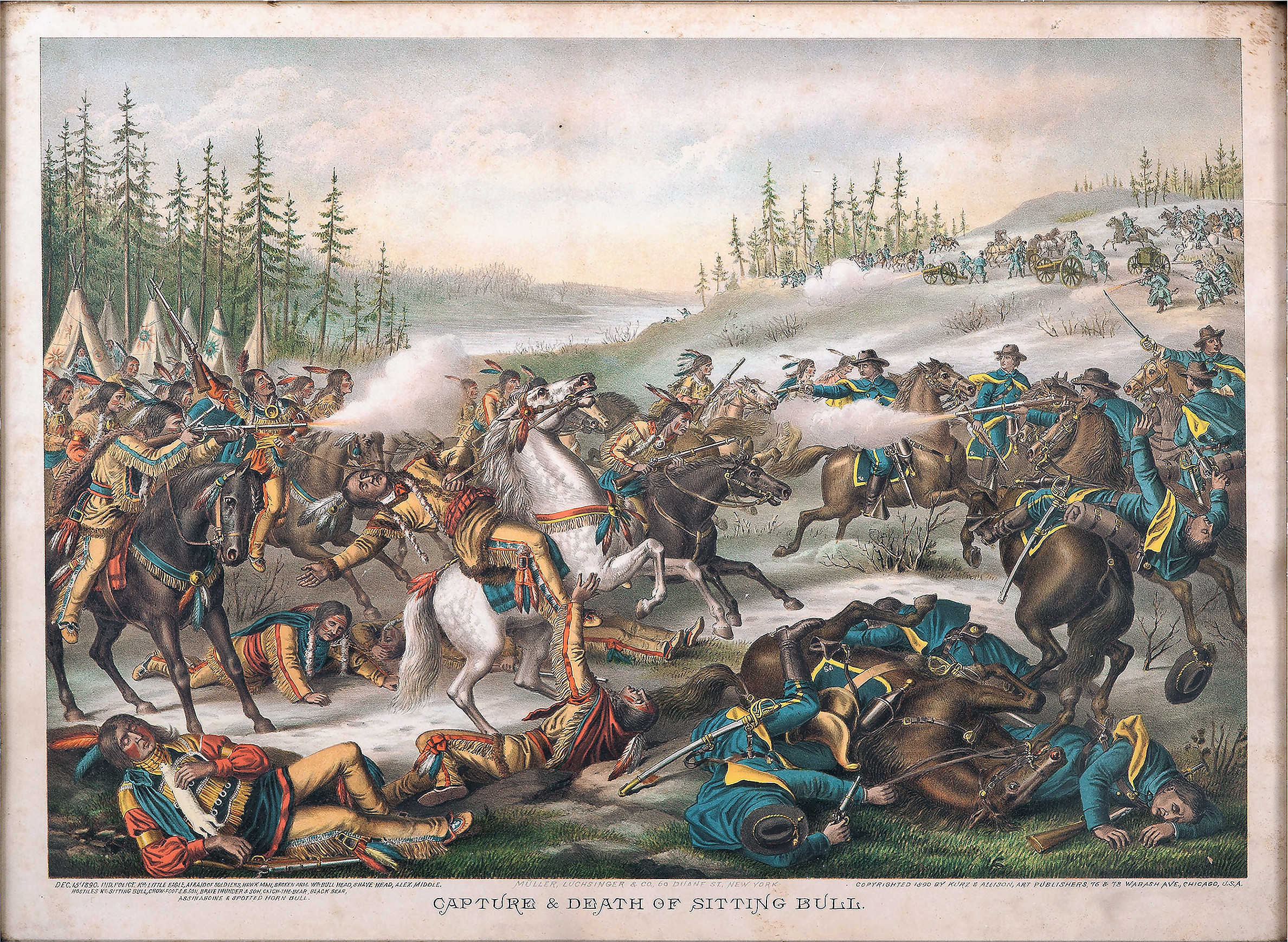
"Capture & Death of Sitting Bull" by Kurz and Allison.

"I am not going. Do with me what you like. I am not going. Come on! Come on! Take action! Let's go!"
— Sitting Bull, Hunkpapa Lakota leader (15 December 1890), during unsuccessful attempt by police to arrest him

"I am not afraid to die."
— Emma Abbott, American operatic soprano (5 January 1891), dying of pneumonia

"My heart is resting sweetly with Jesus, and my hand is in his."
— Howard Crosby, American Presbyterian preacher, scholar and professor (29 March 1891)

"Yes." (Note: Also reported as, "Nancy, I want you to know that my last thoughts are of you" (to his wife) and as "How were the circus receipts today at Madison Square Garden?" Brahms describes this last version as "unlikely".)
— P. T. Barnum, American showman (7 April 1891), when asked if he wanted a drink of water

"God bless Captain Vere!"
— Herman Melville, American novelist (28 September 1891), quoting his final, unfinished novella, Billy Budd

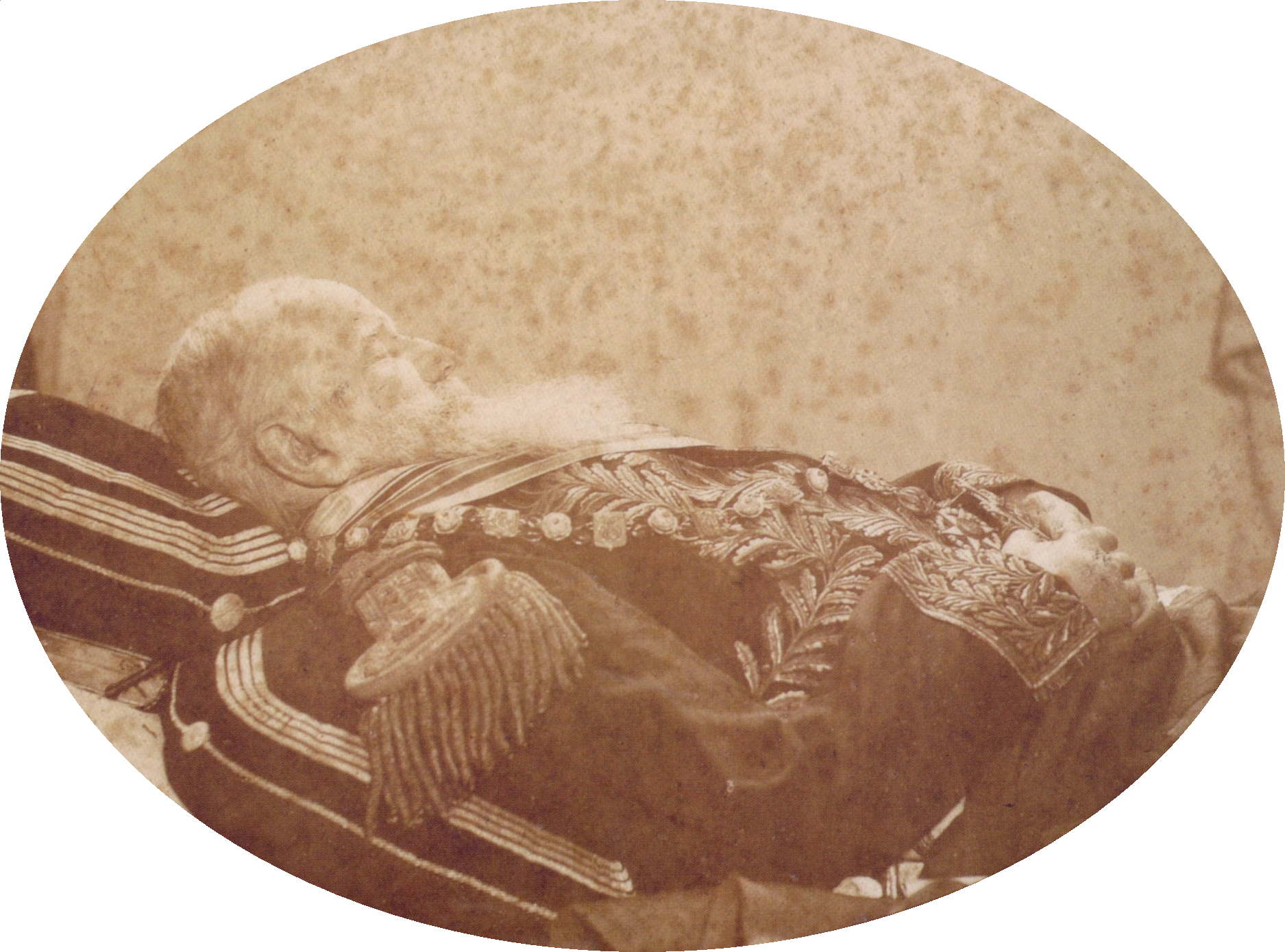
Pedro II, clad in court dress uniform, on his bier, 6 December 1891: the book beneath the pillow under his head symbolized that his mind rests upon knowledge even in death

"May God grant me these last wishes—peace and prosperity for Brazil."
— Emperor Pedro II of Brazil (5 December 1891)

"Who is that?"
— Prince Albert Victor, Duke of Clarence and Avondale, second in line to the British throne (14 January 1892); he repeated these words over and over again while dying

"Very weak. Rail to La Encina and Alicante."
— Edward Augustus Freeman, English historian and politician (16 March 1892); his final diary entry

"Warry, shift!" (Note: Also reported as, "Oh, dear, he's a good fellow" and as "O! he's a dear, good fellow" (referring to his friend Thomas Donaldson).)
— Walt Whitman, American poet (26 March 1892), to nurse "Warry" Fritzinger

"I have known thee all the time." (Note: Also reported as, "Give my love to the world.")
— John Greenleaf Whittier, American Quaker poet and abolitionist (7 September 1892), when his niece asked if he knew her

"We perish, we disappear, but the march of time goes on for ever." (Note: Also reported as, "I have done my work. It is the most natural thing in the world to die; let us accept the Laws of the Universe — the heavens and the earth remain" and as "Let us submit to the Laws of Nature of which we are one of the manifestations. The heavens and the earth abide.")
— Ernest Renan, French scholar (2 October 1892)

"I have opened it."
— Alfred, Lord Tennyson FRS, Poet Laureate of the United Kingdom (6 October 1892). He then blessed his wife and son.

"I know I am going where Lucy is."
— Rutherford B. Hayes, president of the United States (17 January 1893), referring to his wife, Lucy Webb Hayes, who had died in 1889

"There is no other life but the eternal."
— Phillips Brooks, American Episcopal clergyman and author, Bishop of Massachusetts (23 January 1893); final written words

"Bring me a glass of Champagne."
— William Price, Welsh physician (23 January 1893)

"Oh, my poor kids. What will ever become of them?"
— Georgiana Drew, American stage actress, mother of Lionel, Ethel and John Barrymore (2 July 1893)

"Bad."
— Hans von Bülow, German conductor, pianist and composer (12 February 1894), in response to being asked how he felt

"Tell this giant of a slave that if I had captured him I would not have asked him anything, I would have killed him on the spot. Let him not ask me any further questions. If he has anything to do, let him."
— Kyari of Bornu, ruler (shehu) of Kanem–Bornu Empire (c. February/March 1894), to his captor Rabih az-Zubayr before his execution

"Enough, Enough."
("Keo-la, Keo-la.")
— Fred C. Roberts, English physician and medical missionary (6 June 1894), dying in Tientsin, China

"I am grateful for your presence."
— Sadi Carnot, President of France (25 June 1894), mortally wounded by assassin, to Dr. Antonin Poncet, who told him his friends were there

"How good!"
— Alexander III of Russia (1 November [O.S. 20 October] 1894), when the priest placed his hands on his head after performing the last rites

"What's that? Do I look strange?"
— Robert Louis Stevenson, Scottish author (3 December 1894), to his wife, Fanny Stevenson, before collapsing from a cerebral haemorrhage

"I love everybody. If ever I had an enemy, I should hope to meet and welcome that enemy in heaven."
— Christina Rossetti, English poet (29 December 1894)

"Charge, young man!"
("¡A la carga, joven!")
— José Martí, Cuban author and national hero (19 May 1895), addressing trooper Angel de la Guardia during the Battle of Dos Ríos

"God protect Bulgaria."
— Stefan Stambolov, Prime Minister of Bulgaria (19 July 1895 OS), mortally wounded by assassins

"Four sixes to beat"
— John Wesley Hardin, American outlaw and gunfighter (19 August 1895), killed in an El Paso saloon by John Selman

"Don't sole the dead man's shoes yet!"
— Paul Verlaine, French poet (8 January 1896), who spent much of his later life in poverty

"You god damned son-of-a-bitch, I am going to kill you!"
— John Selman, American outlaw and gunfighter (6 April 1896), killed by cowboy George Scarborough

"Yes, that is broken, but does not bend!" (Note: Also reported as, "¡Se quiebra pero no se dobla!")
("¡Sí, que se rompa, pero que no se doble!")
— Leandro N. Alem, Argentine politician (1 July 1896); his suicide note, quoting the motto of the Radical Civic Union

"Sacrifices must be made." (Note: Although widely reported, whether these were truly Lilienthal's last words is questionable.)
("Opfer müssen gebracht warden.")
— Otto Lilienthal, German aviation pioneer (10 August 1896), fatally injured in glider crash

"I want to get mumbo-jumbo out of the world."
— William Morris, British textile designer, poet and socialist (3 October 1896), to his family doctor

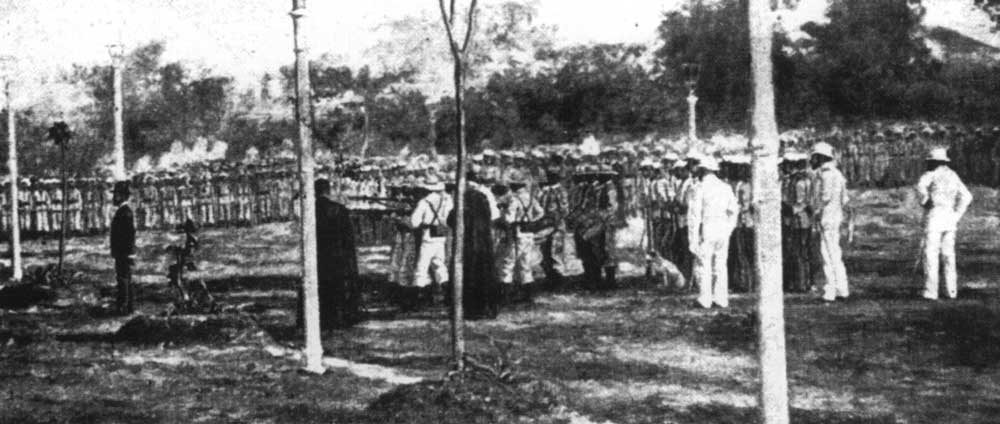
Execution of José Rizal.

"It is done."
("Consummatum est.")
— José Rizal, Filipino nationalist, ophthalmologist and polymath (30 December 1896), quoting Jesus prior to execution by firing squad for rebellion, sedition and conspiracy

"Ah, that tastes nice. Thank you."
("Ah, der schmeckt schön. Danke.")
— Johannes Brahms, German composer (3 April 1897), after being given a glass of wine

"In a few minutes, think that we will see God, that we will be in Heaven."
("Dans quelques minutes, pensez que nous verrons Dieu, que nous serons au Ciel.")
— Duchess Sophie Charlotte in Bavaria (4 May 1897), killed in Bazar de la Charité fire in Paris

"What's the time?"
— Barney Barnato, British Randlord (14 June 1897); he asked this question before jumping overboard from a ship

"My God, I love You!"
— Thérèse of Lisieux, French Catholic Carmelite nun and mystic (30 September 1897)

"It feels fine to be able to sleep here on fast land as a contrast with the drifting ice out upon the ocean where we constantly heard the cracking, grinding, and din. We shall have to gather driftwood and bones of whales and will have to do some moving around when the weather permits."
— Salomon August Andrée, Swedish engineer, physicist, aeronaut and polar explorer (October 1897); final diary entry prior to his death during Arctic balloon expedition

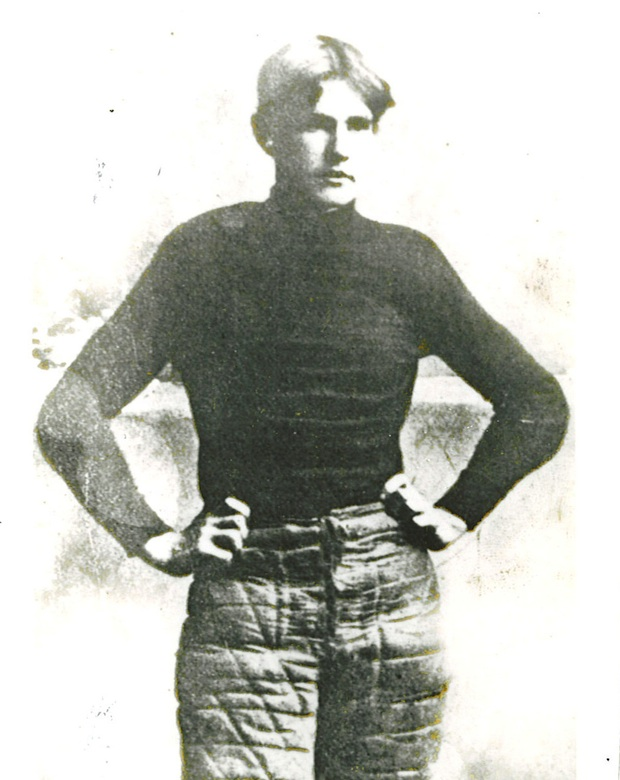
Richard Von Albade Gammon in his athletic attire.

"No, Bill, I've got too much Georgia grit for that."
— Richard Von Albade Gammon, American football fullback fatally injured in game (31 October 1897), responding to teammate who asked if he was going to give up

"Take away these pillows, I won't need them any longer." (Note: Also reported as, "Take away those pillows; I shall need them no more.")
— Lewis Carroll, English mathematician and novelist (14 January 1898)

"I am imploring you – burn all the indecent poems and drawings." (Note: Also reported as, "I implore you to destroy all copies of Lysistrata and bad drawings. Show this to Pollitt and conjure him to do the same. By all that is holy all obscene drawings" (from a letter written to his publisher nine days before his death) and as "Burn all my bawdy pictures.")
— Aubrey Beardsley, English illustrator and author (16 March 1898)

"What can happen to me? I can only die."
— Edward Bellamy, American author, journalist and political activist (22 May 1898)

"Sergeant, the Spanish bullet isn't made that will kill me."
— Buckey O'Neill, captain in Theodore Roosevelt's Rough Riders (1 July 1898), just before being shot in the mouth prior to charge up Kettle Hill

"My God, don't shoot!"
— Soapy Smith, con artist and gangster in the American frontier (7 July 1898), after vigilante Frank H. Reid shot him

"House." (Note: Also reported as, "Thank you, my child" (to his daughter).)
("Haus.")
— Otto von Bismarck, German statesman (30 July 1898), writing on a piece of paper with unknown meaning

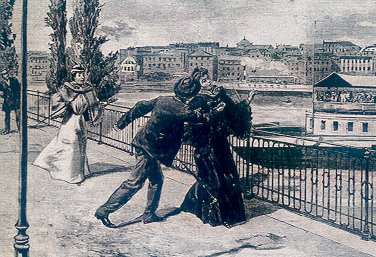
Assassination of Empress Elisabeth of Austria.

"No. What has happened?"
— Empress Elisabeth of Austria (10 September 1898), when asked if she was in pain after being stabbed by Italian anarchist Luigi Lucheni

(One word - uncertain)
— Kaʻiulani, last heir apparent to the throne of the Hawaiian Kingdom (6 March 1899). She may have said "Mama", "Papa" or "Koa" (a nickname for her cousin).

"Good-by, General; I'm done. I'm too old." (Note: Also reported as, "No, it's no use—I'm too old.")
— Harry C. Egbert, United States Army officer (26 March 1899), to General Loyd Wheaton after being mortally wounded during the Battle of Malinta in the Philippine–American War

"I will, whatever happens."
— Johann Strauss II, Austrian composer (3 June 1899), in response to being asked to get some sleep

"Splendid! I'll sleep now. I shall have a nap. Later I can pack and leave on the evening train. But I'm tired. Let me rest."
— Horatio Alger, American author and educator (18 July 1899)

"O, better."
— Robert G. Ingersoll, American lawyer, free thought writer and orator (21 July 1899), when his wife asked him how he felt

"I see earth receding; Heaven is opening; God is calling me."
— Dwight L. Moody, American evangelist and publisher (22 December 1899)

"Jump, Sim, while you have the time."
— Casey Jones, American railroader (30 April 1900), to his fireman shortly before his passenger train collided with a stalled freight train

"When you come to the hedge that we must all go over, it isn't so bad. You feel sleepy, you don't care. Just a little dreamy anxiety, which world you're really in, that's all."
— Stephen Crane, American author (5 June 1900)

"Keep up the fire, men."
— Emerson H. Liscum, United States Army colonel (13 July 1900), dying after being shot at the Battle of Tientsin

"Oh, that I might live five years more for my country's sake."
— Cushman Kellogg Davis, United States Senator from Minnesota (27 November 1900)

"My wallpaper and I are fighting a duel to the death. One or the other of us has to go." (Note: Also reported as, "Either that wallpaper goes, or I do" and as "I am dying as I have lived – beyond my means.")
— Oscar Wilde, Irish playwright (30 November 1900)
