= List of last words (21st century) =

List of last words
18th century	19th century	20th century	21st century

The following is a list of last words uttered by notable individuals during the 21st century (2001–present). A typical entry will report information in the following order:

- Last word(s), name and short description, date of death, circumstances around their death (if applicable), and a reference.

== 2001–2009 ==
"Okay, just wondering." (Note: Earnhardt's last specifically reported words. According to Pilgrim, he was subsequently heard "cheering on and yelling for Michael (Waltrip) and (Dale Earnhardt) Junior" prior to the crash.)
— Dale Earnhardt Sr., American race car driver (18 February 2001), after asking teammate Andy Pilgrim if he had any advice for him prior to his fatal crash in the 2001 Daytona 500

"It matters not how strait the gate, How charged with punishments the scroll, I am the master of my fate: I am the captain of my soul."
— Timothy McVeigh, American domestic terrorist (11 June 2001). Convicted of the Oklahoma City bombing, McVeigh chose "Invictus" (Latin for "unconquered"), an 1875 poem by the British poet William Ernest Henley, as his final statement prior to his execution by lethal injection.

September 11 attacks

- "Turning right, American 11."
— Captain John Ogonowski, pilot of American Airlines Flight 11 (11 September 2001), after talking from Boston Center while it was continuing to cruise before hijackers storming the cockpit.

- "Nobody move, please. We are going back to the airport. Don't try to make any stupid moves." (Note: Atta's true last words were, in all likelihood, recorded on the aircraft's cockpit voice recorder, which was presumed to have been destroyed in the crash or post-crash fire.)
— Mohamed Atta, Egyptian terrorist and ringleader of the September 11 attacks (11 September 2001), last recorded words before he crashed American Airlines Flight 11 into the North Tower of the World Trade Center, killing himself and 91 others aboard the flight and around 1,600 others in the North Tower.

- "Pray for us. Pray for us." (Note: Ong's last recorded words were "No. Somebody's calling medical and we can't get a doc—" (in response to Operations Specialist Nydia Gonzalez asking if she had tried calling anyone else for help treating stab victims on the plane).)
— Betty Ong, American flight attendant aboard American Airlines Flight 11 (11 September 2001), on a phone call with American Airlines officials.

- "I see water. I see buildings. I see buildings! We are flying low. We are flying very, very low. We are flying way too low. Oh, my God we are flying way too low. Oh, my God!"
— Madeline Amy Sweeney, American flight attendant aboard American Airlines Flight 11 (11 September 2001), over the phone to manager Michael Woodward.

- "It's getting bad, Dad. A stewardess was stabbed. They seem to have knives and Mace. They said they have a bomb. It's getting very bad on the plane. Passengers are throwing up and getting sick. The plane is making jerky movements. I don't think the pilot is flying the plane. I think we are going down. I think they intend to go to Chicago or someplace and fly into a building. Don't worry, Dad. If it happens, it'll be very fast ... Oh, my God ... oh, my God, oh, my God."
— Peter Hanson, American passenger aboard United Airlines Flight 175 (11 September 2001), over the phone to his father, Lee.

- "What do I tell the pilot to do?"
— Barbara Olson, American lawyer and conservative television commentator who was aboard American Airlines Flight 77 (11 September 2001), over the phone to her husband, Solicitor General Theodore Olson.

- "Are you guys ready? Let's roll."
— Todd Beamer, American passenger aboard United Airlines Flight 93 (11 September 2001), signaling the start of the revolt against the flight's hijackers, resulting in the plane crashing in the ensuing struggle for the controls, killing all 44 aboard

- "Don't worry, we're going to do something."
— Tom Burnett, American passenger on United Airlines Flight 93 (11 September 2001), over a last phone call to his wife, Deena.

- "We're going to rush the hijackers."
— Jeremy Glick, American passenger on United Airlines Flight 93 (11 September 2001), over the phone to his wife, Lyzbeth, prior to the revolt.

- "Honey, are you there? Jack, pick up sweetie. Okay, well I just wanted to tell you I love you. We’re having a little problem on the plane. I’m totally fine, I just love you more than anything, just know that. And you know, I’m, you know, I’m comfortable and I’m okay... for now. Just a little problem. So I just love you, please tell my family I love them too. Bye, honey."
— Lauren Grandcolas, American passenger aboard United Airlines Flight 93 (11 September 2001), last message sent to her husband Jack.

- "Elsa, it's Lynn. Um. I only have a minute. I'm on United 93, and it's been hijacked, uh, by terrorists, who say they have a bomb. Apparently, they, uh, flown a couple of planes into the World Trade Center already, and it looks like they're going to take this one down as well. Mostly, I just wanted to say I love you . . . and . . . I'm going to miss you . . . and . . . and please give my love to Mom and Dad, and (sigh) mostly, I just love you and I just wanted to tell you that. I don't know if I'm going to get the chance to tell you that again or not. (sigh) Um. . . (unintelligible) All my stuff is in the safe. The uh, the safe is in my closet in my bedroom. The combination is you push C for clear and then 0-9-1-3 and then, uh, and then it should . . . and maybe pound, and then it should unlock. (sigh) I love you, and I hope that I can talk to you soon. Bye."
— Linda Gronlund, American passenger aboard United Airlines Flight 93 (11 September 2001), last message sent to sister, Elsa Strong.

- "Hi baby, I'm... baby, you have to listen to me carefully. I'm on a plane that's been hijacked. I'm on a plane; I'm calling from the plane. Wanna tell you I love you. Please tell my children that I love them very much. And, I'm so sorry, babe. Um, I don't know what to say, there's three guys they've hijacked the plane. I'm trying to be calm . . . We're turned around and I've heard that there's planes that have been, been flown into the World Trade Center. I hope to be able to see your face again, baby! I love you. Goodbye."
— CeeCee Lyles, Flight attendant aboard United Airlines Flight 93 (11 September 2001), last message sent to her husband.

- "Hey! Hey! Give it to me! Give it to me! Give it to me! Give it to me! Give it to me! Give it to me! Give it to me! Give it to me!"
— Ziad Jarrah, Lebanese terrorist of the September 11 attacks (11 September 2001), last words recorded on the cockpit voice recorder during the passenger revolt before he crashed United Airlines Flight 93 into Shanksville, killing himself and 43 others aboard the flight.

- "Allah is the greatest. Allah is the greatest."
— Saeed al-Ghamdi, Saudi terrorist of the September 11 attacks (11 September 2001), reciting the takbir, recorded on the cockpit voice recorder during the crash of United Airlines Flight 93, killing all aboard the flight.

- "We're looking in... We're overlooking the Financial Center. Three of us... Two broken windows... Oh, God! Oh—!"
— Kevin Cosgrove, American business executive employed at the South Tower of the World Trade Center (11 September 2001), over the phone to a 911 dispatcher, who he called from the 105th floor. His last words were uttered when the South Tower collapsed.

- "Fie [sic] here Love yous"
— Gregory Reda, American manager employed by Marsh McLennan at the North Tower of the World Trade Center (11 September 2001), texting his coworker Michael Cantatore from the 95th floor, one of the impact floors.

- "I'm safe, I'm with the firemen."
— Bill Biggart, American photo journalist (11 September 2001), message to his wife before dying in the collapse of the North Tower.

- "Willie, don't forget. I died trying to save you guys.”

— Dominick Pezzulo, Italian-American Port Authority Police Department (PAPD) officer (11 September 2001), to Officer Will Jimeno, before dying from injuries sustained during the collapse of the North Tower

"I will never die."
("Aku tak akan mati.")
— Mona Fandey, Malaysian pop singer, bomoh, and murderer (2 November 2001), prior to execution by hanging.

"Love one another."
— George Harrison, English musician and songwriter (29 November 2001), to his wife, Olivia Harrison, and son, Dhani Harrison.

"Carol, I am so sorry for this. I feel I just can't go on. I have always tried to do the right thing but where there was once great pride now it's gone. I love you and the children so much. I just can't be any good to you or myself. The pain is overwhelming. Please try to forgive me. Cliff—J. Clifford Baxter."
— J. Clifford Baxter, Enron executive (25 January 2002); his suicide note, addressed to his wife. Baxter had been slated to testify before United States congressional committees concerning the Enron scandal.

"Don't leave me like this."
—Layne Staley, American musician and singer (5 April 2002).

"That's enough for today, Mr. Heise!"
("Für heute reicht es, Herr Heise!")
— Robert Steinhäuser, German student and perpetrator of the Erfurt school massacre (26 April 2002), said to a teacher prior to committing suicide

"I found it very enjoyable. It had the depth of a puddle of water."
(Ik vond het ontzettend gezellig. Het had de diepgang van een plas water.)
— Pim Fortuyn, Dutch politician (6 May 2002). Fortuyn was asked about the quality of an interview he was attending with Ruud de Wild. Shortly following the interview, he was assassinated by gunshot.

"Goodnight for the 4th time."
— John Entwistle, English musician and bassist for The Who (27 June 2002), stated to groupie Alycen Rowse before going to sleep in bed with her.

"My fellow citizens, do cigarettes taste good? They are poisonous. I used to smoke two packs a day. Ha... I really regret it now. If only I had quit a year ago. My fellow citizens, cigarettes destroy families and health. My fellow citizens, you must quit smoking."
("국민 여러분, 담배 맛있습니까? 그거 독약입니다. 저도 하루에 두 갑씩 피웠습니다. 하... 지금은 정말 후회합니다. 1년 전에만 끊었어도 말입니다. 국민 여러분, 담배는 가정과 건강을 파괴합니다. 국민 여러분, 담배 끊어야 합니다.")
— Lee Ju-il, Korean politician and comedian (27 June 2002), died from lung cancer caused by smoking.

2002 Überlingen mid-air collision

- "Fuck me!"
— First officer Brant Campioni, Canadian pilot of DHL Flight 611 (1 July 2002)

- "Ugh!"
("Фу!")
— Captain Alexander Gross, Russian pilot of Bashkirian Airlines Flight 2937 (1 July 2002)

"Yes, I would just like to say I'm sailing with the rock, and I'll be back, like Independence Day, with Jesus. June 6, like the movie. Big mother ship and all, I'll be back, I'll be back."
— Aileen Wuornos, American prostitute and serial killer (9 October 2002), prior to execution by lethal injection

"It was the food!"
— Richard Harris, Irish actor and singer (25 October 2002), while being wheeled out of the Savoy Hotel

"I die with the conviction, held since 1968 and Catonsville, that nuclear weapons are the scourge of the earth; to mine for them, manufacture them, deploy them, use them, is a curse against God, the human family, and the earth itself."
— Philip Berrigan, American peace activist and former Roman Catholic priest (6 December 2002); final statement dictated to his wife, Elizabeth McAlister

"I told u I was hardcore [...] u are so fucking stupid" [sic]
— Brandon Vedas (also known by his nickname ripper on IRC), American computer enthusiast, recreational drug user and member of the Shroomery.org community (12 January 2003), who died of a multiple drug overdose while discussing what he was doing via IRC chat and webcam. "I told u I was hardcore" was one of the last things Vedas typed, a phrase often quoted sarcastically on Internet message boards and discussion sites.

"Help me, help me."
— Stephen Oake, QGM, Greater Manchester Police counter-terrorism detective (14 January 2003), while being stabbed in the chest by Algerian illegal immigrant Kamel Bourgass

"Roger, uh, bu-"
— Rick Husband, American astronaut (1 February 2003), final transmission received prior to the disintegration of Space Shuttle Columbia during reentry

"Am I a sheep?"
— Fred Rogers, American television host, writer, producer, and minister (27 February 2003), question he'd given to his wife Joanne in reference to the Last Judgment of the Bible.

"Channel 5 is all shit, isn't it? Christ, the crap they put on there. It's a waste of space."
— Adam Faith, English singer and actor (8 March 2003)

"Depression! Many thanks to all my friends. Many thanks to Professor Felice Lieh-Mak (Cheung's last psychiatrist). This year has been so tough. I can't stand it anymore. Many thanks to Tong Tong (nickname for Cheung's boyfriend Daffy Tong). Many thanks to my family. Many thanks to Sister Fei. In my life I have done nothing bad. Why does it have to be like this?"
(「Depression！！多謝各位朋友 多謝麥列菲菲 呢一年真好辛苦 不能再忍受 多謝唐唐 多謝家人 多謝肥姐 我一生無做壞事 為何會怎樣？？？」)
— Leslie Cheung, Hong Kong singer and actor (1 April 2003), on his suicide note, before jumping from the 24th floor of the Mandarin Oriental hotel in Hong Kong.

"Leave me alone, I'm fine."
— Barry White, American singer and songwriter (4 July 2003), to a nurse

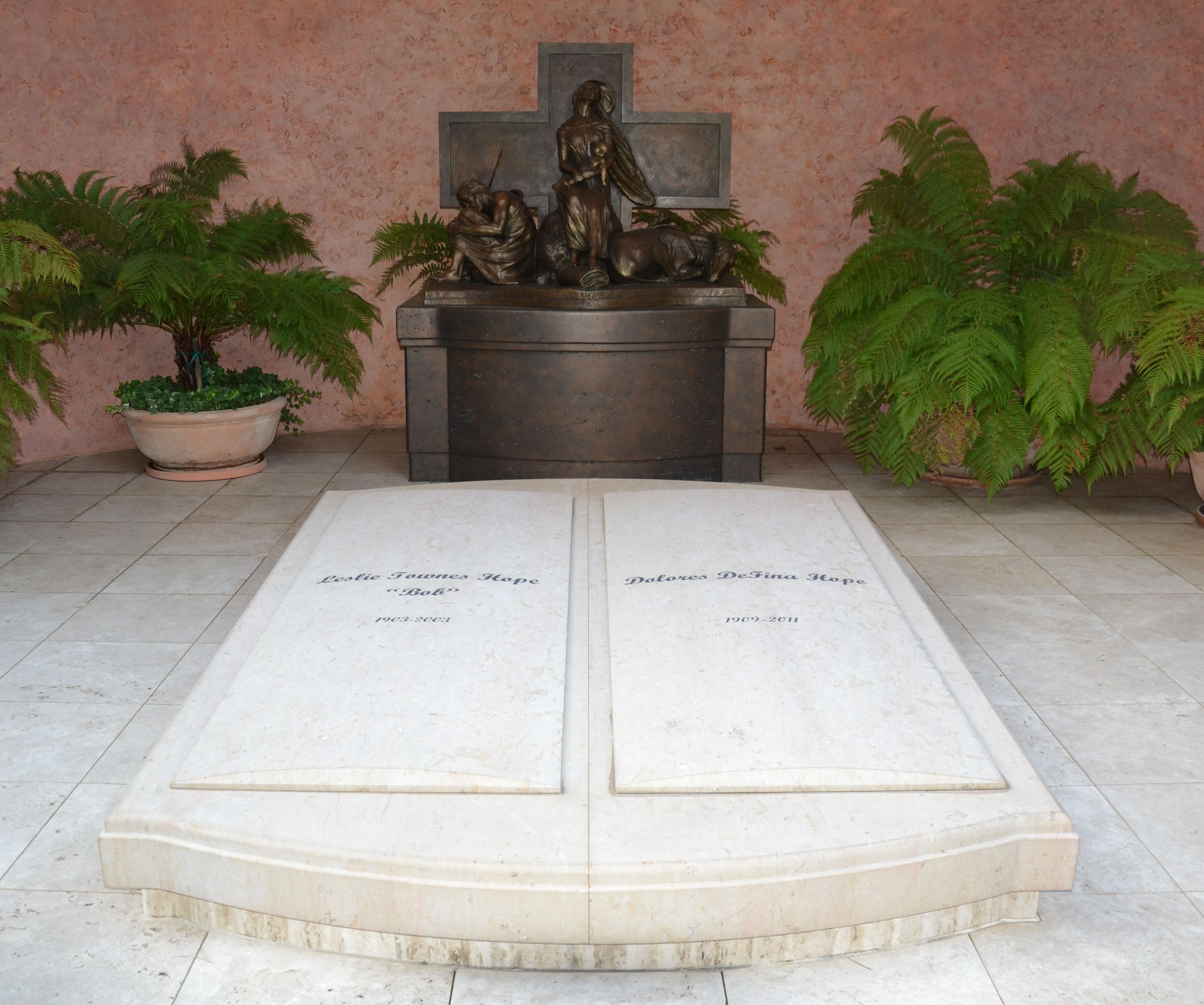
The graves of Bob and Dolores Hope at the San Fernando Mission Cemetery.

"Surprise me."
— Bob Hope, American actor and comedian (27 July 2003), on being asked by his wife, Dolores Hope, where he wanted to be buried

"I should have been a concert pianist."
— Edward Teller, Hungarian-American physicist (9 September 2003)

"I love you"
— John Ritter, American actor (11 September 2003), given in sign language to his wife Amy Yasbeck when being transported in the hospital on a gurney.

"It's time."
— Johnny Cash, American singer-songwriter (12 September 2003), responding to his physical therapist after being unable to complete any of his therapy for the day due to his extremely poor health. Later that day he was rushed to the hospital where he died after his health suddenly plummeted.

"I'd like to thank the Academy for my lifetime achievement award that I will eventually get."
— Donald O'Connor, American actor, dancer and singer (27 September 2003), spoken to his family at his bedside.

"Jeb. Just remember, whatever happens, happens."
— Dwain Weston, Australian BASE jumper (5 October 2003), to fellow skydiver Jeb Corliss prior to fatal wingsuit flight over the Royal Gorge Bridge, during which he struck the bridge while flying at 120 miles per hour (190 km/h)

"Thank you."
— Ricardo Alfonso Cerna, Guatemalan criminal (19 December 2003), to a police officer who gave him a bottle of water, seconds before committing suicide with his .45-caliber handgun, which he had concealed within his clothing

"Yeah. The only statement I want to make is that I am an innocent man - convicted of a crime I did not commit. I have been persecuted for 12 years for something I did not do. From God's dust I came and to dust I will return - so the earth shall become my throne. I gotta go, road dog. I love you Gabby. (Turning towards his ex-wife and the crowd) I hope you rot in hell, bitch. I hope you fucking rot in hell. You bitches. I hope you all fucking rot, cunts. (Lethal injection starts) That is it. (flips the middle finger)" (Note: The last parts were left out by the Texas Department of Criminal Justice in their public release of Willingham's last statement due to containing profanity, but was later released years later by former Public Information Director Michelle Lyons, who witnessed the execution.)
— Cameron Todd Willingham, American convicted murderer (17 February 2004), as his final statement prior to his execution by lethal injection. Willingham spent his last moments cursing his ex-wife and the crowd that came to witness his execution. The warden of the prison became so offended that he commenced the execution in order to cause the insults to cease. Willingham displayed the middle finger in response.

"Now I'll show you how an Italian dies!"
("Vi faccio vedere come muore un Italiano!")
— Fabrizio Quattrocchi, Italian security officer (14 April 2004), to Islamist militant kidnappers in Iraq forcing him to dig his own grave while wearing a hood. Quattrocchi tried to pull the hood off and shouted his last words, and was then shot in the neck.

"What are you shooting at?! I'm Pat Tillman! I'm Pat fucking TILLMAN!"
— Pat Tillman, American football player and Army Ranger (22 April 2004), while being fatally wounded by friendly fire in Afghanistan

"My name is Nick Berg, my father's name is Michael, my mother's name is Suzanne. I have a brother and sister, David and Sara. I live in West Chester, Pennsylvania, near Philadelphia."
— Nick Berg, American radio tower repairman (7 May 2004), on video before beheading by Islamist militants

"I jumped near the entrance to the dam."
— Jonathan Aurthur, American wetlands advocate and author (c. 22 November 2004); his suicide note, found in his car after he jumped to his death in Angeles National Forest

"Van Halen!"
— Dimebag Darrell (8 December 2004), American guitarist shot on stage while performing with his new band, Damageplan.

"I look forward to taking that off."
— Dave Shaw, Australian commercial aviator and technical diver (8 January 2005), referring to his dive mask at the beginning of a fatal dive to recover the body of Deon Dreyer

"Blessed are the poor in spirit ..."
— Dorothy Stang, American-Brazilian nun and activist (12 February 2005), moments before she was shot to death

"Football Season Is Over. No More Games. No More Bombs. No More Walking. No More Fun. No More Swimming. 67. That is 17 years past 50. 17 more than I needed or wanted. Boring. I am always bitchy. No Fun – for anybody. 67. You are getting Greedy. Act your old age. Relax – This won't hurt."
— Hunter S. Thompson, American journalist and author (20 February 2005), in his suicide note, written four days before his death

"Logan Ambulance One base turn complete."
— Guy Henderson, Scottish pilot (15 March 2005); final radio transmission prior to air ambulance crashing off the coast of Scotland, killing Henderson and paramedic John Keith McCreanor

"I have hostages!"
— Jeff Weise, American animator, student, and perpetrator of the Red Lake High School shooting (21 March 2005), yelled at police before he killed himself with a shotgun

"Let me go to the house of the Father."
("Pozwólcie mi iść do domu Ojca.")
— Pope John Paul II (2 April 2005)

"You're a lifesaver, Andy."
— William Donaldson, British satirist and playboy (22 June 2005), to the caretaker of his building, who had collected pills for him

"Roger that, sir. Thank you."
— Michael P. Murphy, United States Navy SEAL and Medal of Honor recipient (28 June 2005), ending a radio call for help after being shot during Operation Red Wings

"Mayday, mayday."
— Andreas Prodromou, Cypriot flight attendant who flew on Helios Airways Flight 522 (14 August 2005), before it was crashed near Athens, Greece

"Don't die like I did."
— George Best, Northern Irish football player (25 November 2005), dying of complications from alcoholism

"My last words will be 'Hoka Hey, it's a good day to die.' Thank you very much. I love you all. Goodbye."
— Clarence Ray Allen, American criminal (17 January 2006); statement written prior to execution by lethal injection

"Atlanta, this is seven niner x-ray, I'd like to deviate south weather."
— Albert Scott Crossfield, American test pilot (19 April 2006); final radio transmission before dying in crash of Cessna 210A at age 84

"My name is David Sharp. I'm with Asian Trekking, and I just want to sleep."
— David Sharp, English mountaineer (15 May 2006), to a group of Sherpas while dying near the summit of Mount Everest

"I've made peace with God; tell my family that I love them."
— Jared C. Monti, United States Army soldier and Medal of Honor recipient (21 June 2006), mortally wounded by rocket-propelled grenade in Afghanistan

"I'm dying."
— Steve Irwin, Australian conservationist (4 September 2006), to cameraman Justin Lyons after being pierced in the chest by a stingray barb

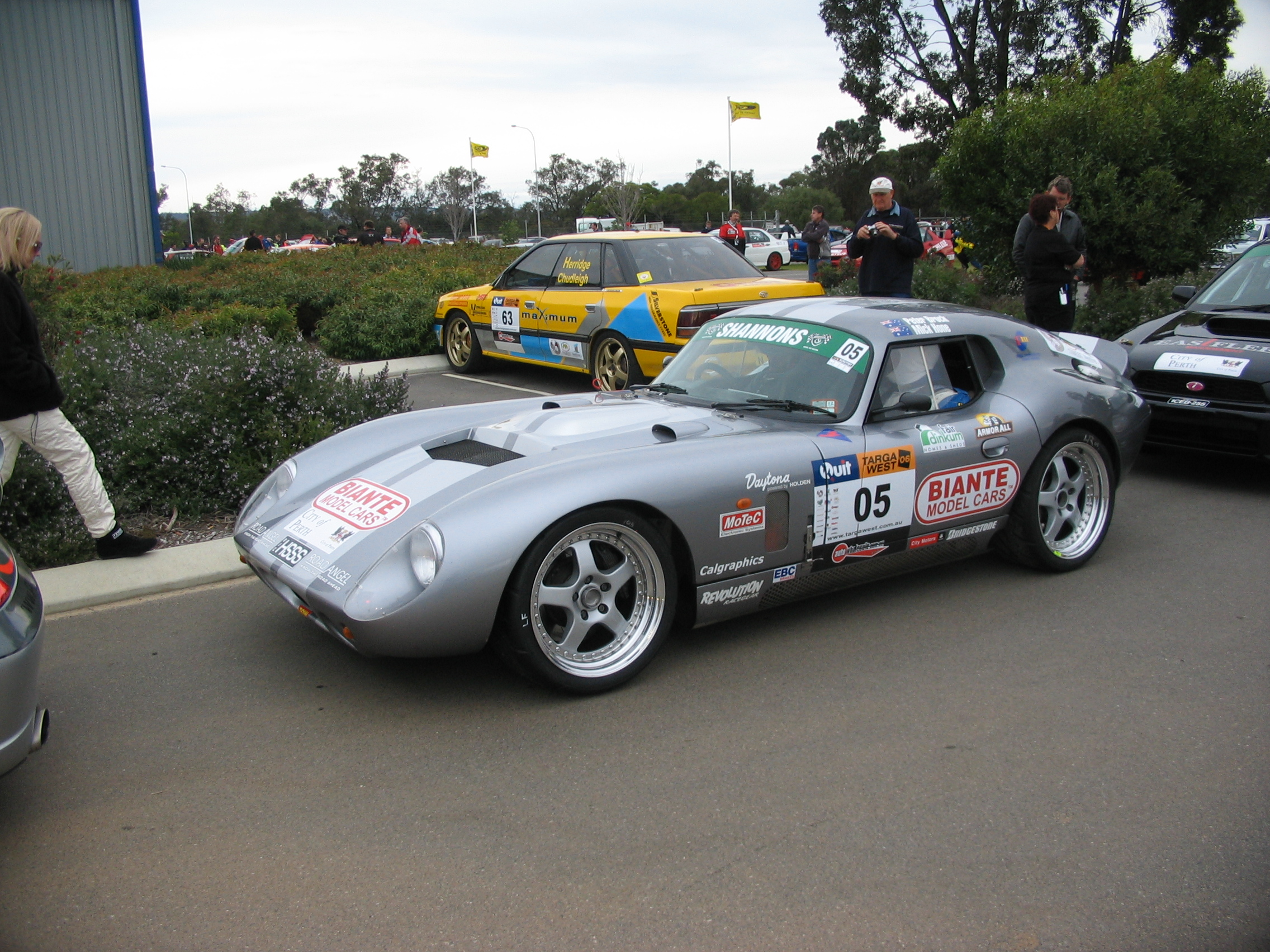
Peter Brock's Daytona Sportscar the day before the accident.

"C'mon. Let's get this day over and done with."
— Peter Brock, Australian motor racing driver (8 September 2006), to track marshal before dying in race crash

"Ouch!!"
("Aii!!")
— First officer Thiago Jordão Cruso, pilot of Gol Transportes Aéreos Flight 1907 (29 September 2006), just after being collided with Embraer Legacy 600 business jet

"Mom, don't be afraid. Since Jesus became a man, death has become the passage towards life, and we don't need to flee it. Let us prepare ourselves to experience something extraordinary in the eternal life."
— Carlo Acutis, Italian teenager who used the internet to promote Catholic devotion (11 October 2006), to his mother before falling into a coma from leukemia. He died one day later at the age of 15 and was canonized as a saint in 2025.

"I'm not gonna hurt anyone."
— Bill Conradt, American assistant district attorney (5 November 2006), to the SWAT team raiding his home as part of a sting operation on NBC's To Catch a Predator before fatally shooting himself in the head.

"Grenade. ... It's in the truck."
— Ross A. McGinnis, United States Army soldier and Medal of Honor recipient (4 December 2006), prior to covering grenade with his body to protect the other soldiers in his vehicle

"Lucy."
— Augusto Pinochet, Chilean general and statesman (10 December 2006), calling his wife Lucía Hiriart by his affectionate name for her

"I'm going away tonight."
— James Brown, American musician (25 December 2006), to his manager Charles Bobbit, before dying in his sleep

"There is no god but Allah, and Muhammad..."
— Saddam Hussein, fifth President of Iraq (30 December 2006). Saddam recited the Shahada twice as he was executed, dying as he said "and Muhammad" in his second recitation.

"Checking out."
("Выписываемся.")
— Boris Yeltsin, first President of Russia (23 April 2007), answering a doctor asking how he was before losing consciousness and dying from heart failure.

"My address is 130 Green Meadow Lane, Fayetteville, Georgia 30215"
— Chris Benoit, Canadian professional wrestler (24 June 2007), last text message sent to a co-worker before committing suicide after having murdered his wife and son.

Phoenix news helicopter collision

- "Looks like he's gonna try and take another vehicle here, we'll see if they block him in there. Looks like they've got him blocked in there but he did get—"
— Scott Bowerbank, American helicopter pilot for independent television station KTVK in Phoenix, Arizona (27 July 2007), describing police pursuit before colliding with the helicopter from KNXV-TV, resulting in the deaths of two persons per helicopter.

- "Oh, jeez."
— Craig Smith, American helicopter pilot for ABC's Phoenix affiliate KNXV-TV (27 July 2007), describing police pursuit before colliding with the helicopter from KTVK, resulting in the deaths of two persons per helicopter.

"Don't kill me."
— Chauncey Bailey, American journalist (2 August 2007), to his murderer, Devaughndre Brousard

"You be good, I love you. See you tomorrow."
— Alex the African grey parrot (6 September 2007)

"Long live Bhutto."
("Jeay Bhutto.")
— Benazir Bhutto, Prime Minister of Pakistan (27 December 2007), immediately prior to assassination

"Katie, Katie, look, it'll be fine, you know, I just need to get some sleep."
— Heath Ledger, Australian actor (22 January 2008), on the phone to his sister before accidentally taking a lethal combination of prescription medications

"Look after my dog for me."
— Glenn Hollinshead, British man (20 May 2008), to a neighbour after being stabbed by Sabina Eriksson, a woman who was in a state of folie à deux (shared psychosis) with her twin sister Ursula.

"Tape Seinfeld for me."
— Harvey Korman, American actor and comedian (29 May 2008)

"I guess my flying days are over."
— Johnny Miller, American aviation pioneer (23 June 2008), to his nephew while dying at the age of 102. Miller made his final flight at the age of 101.

"Please let me sleep. Please."
— Bruce Edward Ivins, American microbiologist and suspect in the 2001 anthrax attacks (29 July 2008), in a note to his wife instructing her not to wake him up after he had intentionally overdosed on Tylenol.

"Don't come up, I will handle them."
— Sandeep Unnikrishnan, Indian Army officer (26 November 2008), final message to NSG troops before succumbing to injuries during the attack on the Taj Mahal Palace Hotel in Mumbai.

"Ride 'em, cowboys."
— Captain Kyle Mosley (23 March 2009), pilot of FedEx Express Flight 80; final transmission before the aircraft crashed upon landing.

"I am in debt to so many people. I have caused too great a burden to be placed upon them. I can't begin to fathom the countless agonies down the road. The rest of my life would only be a burden for others. I am unable to do anything because of poor health. I can't read, I can't write. Do not be too sad. Isn't life and death all a part of nature? Do not be sorry. Do not feel resentment toward anyone. It is fate. Cremate me. And leave only a small tombstone near home. I've thought on this for a long time."
("너무 많은 사람들에게 신세를 졌다. 나로 말미암아 여러 사람이 받은 고통이 너무 크다. 앞으로 받을 고통도 헤아릴 수가 없다. 여생도 남에게 짐이 될 일 밖에 없다. 건강이 좋지 않아서 아무것도 할 수가 없다. 책을 읽을 수도 글을 쓸 수도 없다.너무 슬퍼하지 마라. 삶과 죽음이 모두 자연의 한 조각 아니겠는가? 미안해하지 마라. 누구도 원망하지 마라. 운명이다. 화장해라. 그리고 집 가까운 곳에 아주 작은 비석 하나만 남겨라. 오래된 생각이다..")
— Roh Moo-hyun, 9th President of South Korea (23 May 2009), on his suicide note, before jumping from a cliff behind his home in Bongha Village

"Redmond"
— Farrah Fawcett, American actress (25 June 2009), calling out the name of her son Redmond O'Neal

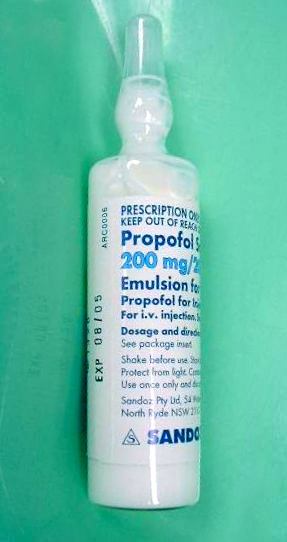
Michael Jackson asked his doctor for more propofol, and was given an injection which led to his death. The doctor was convicted of involuntary manslaughter.

"More milk."
— Michael Jackson, American musician (25 June 2009), asking his doctor for more propofol shortly before he died from an overdose of the same drug.

"Say goodnight to your mother if she's still awake."
— Edward Kenna VC, last living Australian Second World War recipient of the Victoria Cross (8 July 2009), to his daughter before dying in the same nursing home where his wife lived.

"Take care of each other."
— Corazon Aquino, President of the Philippines (1 August 2009), to her family

"I love you."
— Patrick Swayze, American actor (14 September 2009), to his wife Lisa Niemi

"I'm the happiest man in the world. I've just summited a beautiful mountain."
— Clifton Maloney, American businessman (25 September 2009), prior to falling asleep and not waking up at Camp 2 on Cho Oyu

"Are you ready?"
— Michael Patrick Scusa, United States Army sergeant (3 October 2009), prior to being shot in the neck at the Battle of Kamdesh in Afghanistan

"Mom, I'm dying. I love you."
— Brittany Murphy, American actress (20 December 2009), as she was about to die from pneumonia and multiple drug intake

== 2010–2019 ==
"Mom, I hope you have a good day at work and I love you very much. Love, Jennifer."
— Jennifer Daugherty, American mentally handicapped woman who was tortured to death (11 February 2010), note written to her mother

"Thanks for your help. Have a great day."
— Andrew Joseph Stack III, American embedded software developer (18 February 2010), to air traffic control shortly before intentionally crashing his plane into an office building in Austin, Texas

"Free Leonard Peltier."
— Malcolm McLaren, English music manager (8 April 2010), talking about political prisoner Leonard Peltier

"I love you and my head hurts."
— Gary Coleman, American actor (8 May 2010), to his ex-wife Shannon Price

"I'd like to say 'thank you' to my family for being here and all of my friends. Boomer Sooner."
— Jeffrey Landrigan, American convicted murderer (26 October 2010), prior to execution by lethal injection

"Don't turn on the light."
— Osama bin Laden, Islamist militant terrorist (2 May 2011), before being shot by a U.S. military special operations unit

"Stopping for a beer, be there when I can."
— Ryan Dunn, American stunt performer (20 June 2011), last text to Bam Margera prior to fatal car crash

"I don't want to die."
— Amy Winehouse, English singer and songwriter (23 July 2011)

"My friends, love is better than anger. Hope is better than fear. Optimism is better than despair. So let us be loving, hopeful and optimistic. And we'll change the world. All my very best, Jack Layton."
— Jack Layton, Canadian politician and Leader of the Official Opposition (22 August 2011), in his final letter to Canadians

"Oh wow. Oh wow. Oh wow."
— Steve Jobs, American electronics businessman (5 October 2011), looking at his family

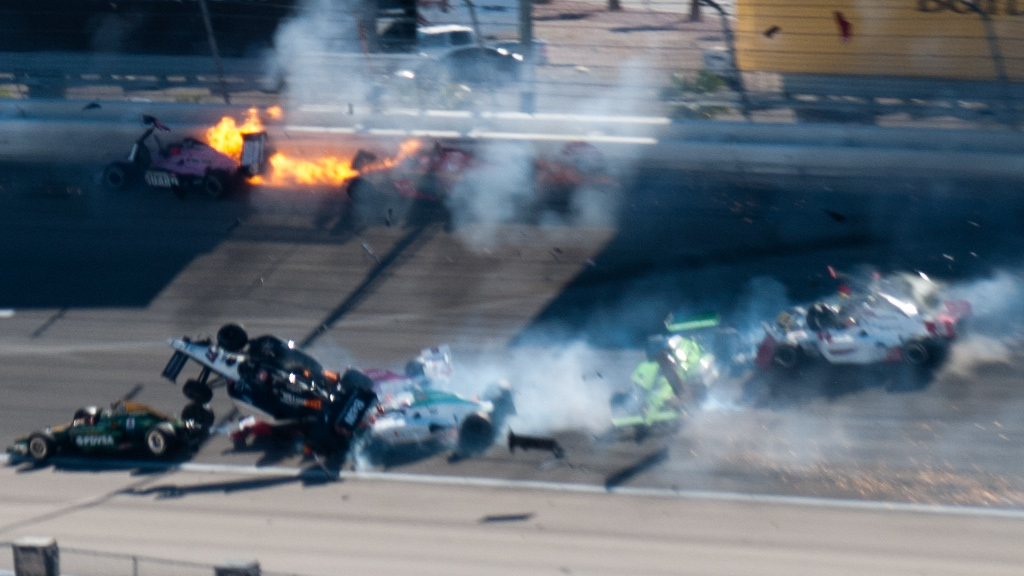
Dan Wheldon's fatal crash.

"I'm ready to go for this thing; we can win this thing."
— Dan Wheldon, British motor racing driver (16 October 2011), last radio transmission before fatal crash at the 2011 IZOD IndyCar World Championship

"What did I do to you?"
("ماذا فعلت لك؟")
— Muammar Gaddafi, ousted leader of Libya (20 October 2011), to his captors while he was tortured (before being eventually killed) (Note: Other witnesses stated that his last words were "Don't shoot!")

"If I'm no better tomorrow I will go" (Note: Also reported as, "I'm not coming now. I'll come in the morning")
— Jimmy Savile, English DJ and TV presenter (29 October 2011), during phone call to Alistair Hall who had suggested he should return to hospital due to ill health and suffering from pneumonia. Savile died of cardiac arrest, heart failure, ischaemic disease and renal failure. Savile was posthumously exposed as a predatory sex offender.

"Capitalism... Downfall."
— Christopher Hitchens, English-American author (15 December 2011), to his agent Steven Wasserman

"I'm gonna go see Jesus, want to see Jesus."
— Whitney Houston, American musician (11 February 2012)

"I called you a putz cause [sic] I thought you werebeing [sic] intentionally disingenuous. If not I apologize.@CenLamar @dust92"
— Andrew Breitbart, American conservative publisher and writer (1 March 2012), final tweet before dying of heart attack

"I wish you all good things. Live your life, live your life, live your life."
— Maurice Sendak, American author and illustrator of Where the Wild Things Are (8 May 2012), he spoke with NPR's Terry Gross in 2011, before he died at Danbury Hospital in Danbury, Connecticut, at age 83, due to complications from a stroke.

"I love you"
— Taruni Sachdev, Indian child actress and model (14 May 2012), final text to best friend before dying in 2012 Agni Air Dornier 228 crash

"Save me."
— Shriya Shah-Klorfine, Nepali-Canadian woman (19 May 2012), while dying on Mount Everest

"Why?"
— Skylar Neese, American child murder victim (6 July 2012), to her murderers, Shelia Eddy and Rachel Shoaf after being stabbed.

"I got to go. I can't be here."
— Jovan Belcher, American football linebacker (1 December 2012), shortly before committing suicide. He had murdered his girlfriend minutes earlier during an argument.

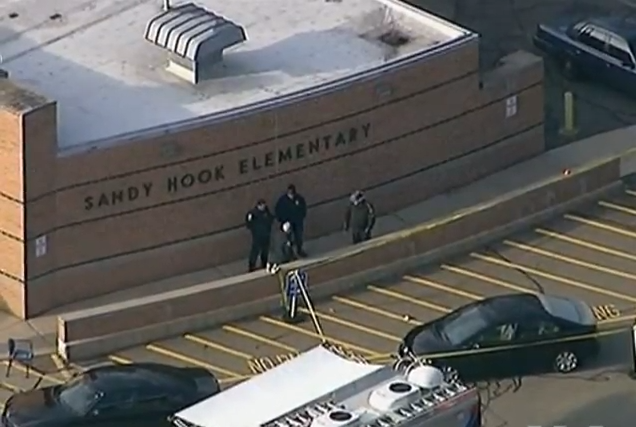
Police arrive at Sandy Hook Elementary, after the shooting

Sandy Hook Elementary School shooting

- "Run!"
— Jesse Lewis, victim of the Sandy Hook Elementary School shooting (14 December 2012), urging his classmates to flee while Adam Lanza was reloading his weapon

- "Well, you're here."
— Adam Lanza, perpetrator of the Sandy Hook Elementary School shooting (14 December 2012), responding to one of his victims stating they did not want to be there (Note: He also reportedly said "Look at me!", "Come over here!", and "Look at them!" Based on available information regarding the timeline of the shooting, it is likely that he stated "Well, you're here" after the other statements.)

"Aloha."
— Daniel Inouye, American lawyer and politician (17 December 2012)

"Well, I hope Percy ain't going to forget to wet the sponge. Put me on the highway to Jackson and call my Irish buddies. Póg mo thóin. God bless."
— Robert Gleason, American serial killer (16 January 2013)

"I don't want to die, please don't let me die."
("No quiero morir, por favor no me dejen morir.")
— Hugo Chávez, Venezuelan statesman (5 March 2013), whispering unable to speak

"So on this day of reflection I say again, thank you for going on this journey with me. I'll see you at the movies."
— Roger Ebert, American author and film critic (5 April 2013), from his final blog post.

"Well, hello there, I've been looking for you. My name's George Jones."
— George Jones, American musician (26 April 2013), moments before dying in his hospital bed

"oh. IT'S A SHARK TORNADO."
— Cory Monteith, Canadian actor and musician (13 July 2013), in his last post to Twitter, the night before he was found dead from a drug overdose in a Vancouver hotel room.

"Be not afraid."
("Nole timere")
— Seamus Heaney, Irish poet (30 August 2013), final text to his wife

"Get to a safe place. Something really bad might happen."
— Michael Landsberry, teacher, Marine, victim of the Sparks Middle School shooting (21 October 2013), while attempting to disarm the shooter.

"Take me into the light"
— Lou Reed, American guitarist, musician, and songwriter (27 October 2013), while he was meditating with his wife Laurie Anderson as he died.

"Hey, let's go for a drive."
— Paul Walker, American actor (30 November 2013), prior to dying with his friend Roger Rodas in crash of Porsche Carrera GT

"Good night, Malaysian three seven zero." (Note: Incorrectly reported as, "All right, good night.")
— Captain Zaharie Ahmad Shah (8 March 2014), pilot of Malaysia Airlines Flight 370; final transmission before plane's disappearance

"You are the Ultimate Warrior fans and the spirit of Ultimate Warrior will run forever."
— The Ultimate Warrior, American professional wrestler (7 April 2014), in his last public appearance.

"You've forced me to suffer all my life and now I'll force you all suffer. I've waited a long time for this. I'll give you exactly what you deserve. All of you. All you girls who rejected me and looked down upon me and you know, treated me like scum while you gave yourselves to other men. And all of you men, for living a better life than me, all of you sexually active men, I hate you. I hate all of you. I can't wait to give you exactly what you deserve. Utter annihilation."
— Elliot Rodger, perpetrator of the 2014 Isla Vista attacks (23 May 2014), in a final video before carrying out a series of attacks in which he killed six people, and injured 14 more. (Note: Rodger's actual last words are unclear. A woman named Sierra Swartz, reported that Rodger said "Hey, what's up?" before shooting at her, missing. Based on how she phrased her testimony, it is likely that this is a paraphrase of what he said, and not verbatim what he said.)

"Romeo November Delta, Malaysian one seven."
— Captain Eugene Choo Jin Leong, pilot of Malaysia Airlines Flight 17 (17 July 2014), before it was shot down by a surface-to-air missile over in the war-torn airspace of Eastern Ukraine

"I can't breathe. I can't breathe. I can't breathe. I can't breathe. I can't breathe. I can't breathe. I can't breathe. I can't breathe. I can't breathe. I can't breathe. I can't breathe."
— Eric Garner, American former horticulturist (17 July 2014), after being put in a chokehold by an arresting NYPD officer

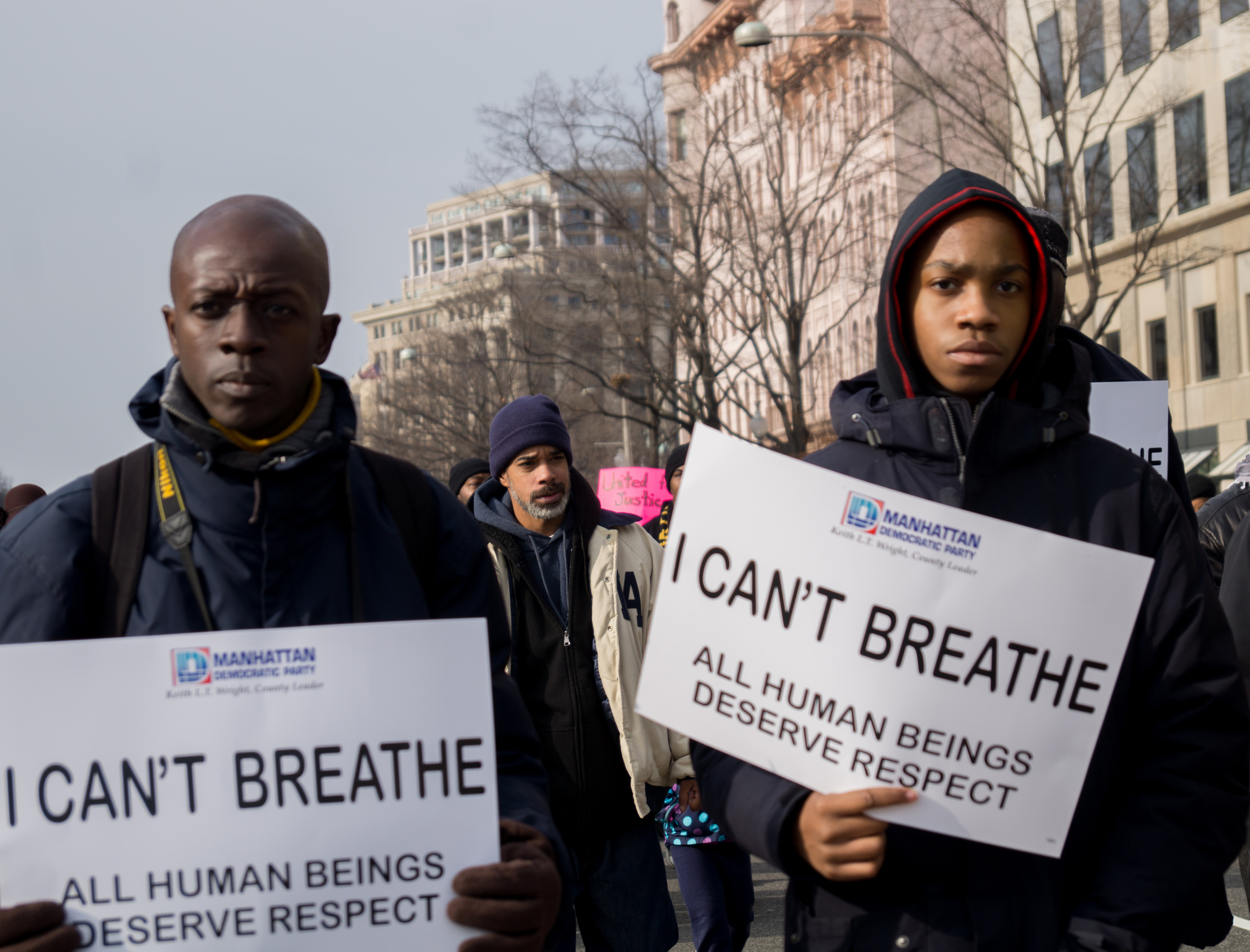
Eric Garner's last words became a slogan associated with the Black Lives Matter movement in the United States.

"Goodnight, my love."
— Robin Williams, American actor and comedian (11 August 2014), to his wife Susan Schneider, prior to committing suicide.

"I wish I had more time. I wish I could have the hope for freedom to see my family once again, but that ship has sailed. I guess all in all, I wish I wasn't American."
— James Foley, American journalist (19 August 2014), he was murdered by the militant group ISIS in August 2014 after being held captive in Syria for nearly two years.

"Remember me as a revolutionary communist."
— Leslie Feinberg, American butch lesbian, transgender activist, communist, and author (15 November 2014)

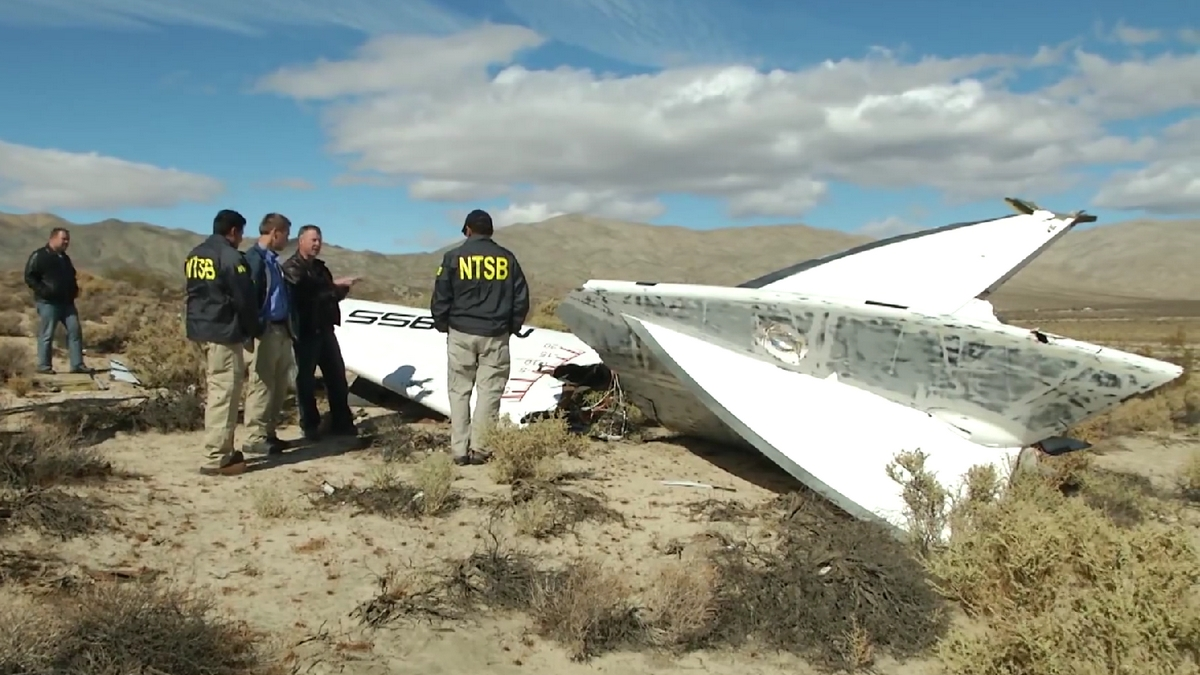
NTSB Go-Team inspects a tail section of VSS Enterprise the day after the crash.

"Pitch up."
— Michael Alsbury, American commercial astronaut (31 October 2014), prior to death in VSS Enterprise crash

"@ChavesRGB Here I am. A hug, with love from your friend: Chespirito."
("@ChavesRGB Aquí estoy. Un abrazo, con cariño de tu amigo: Chespirito.")
— Chespirito (Roberto Gómez Bolaños), Mexican comedian, screenwriter, actor, and director (28 November 2014), final tweet, responding to a Brazilian fan club account

"Excuse me."
("Scusate")
— Mango, Italian singer-songwriter and musician (8 December 2014), raising an arm to the audience before collapsing from a heart attack during a performance

"My body is on fire. No one should go through this... They poked me five times. It feels like acid."
— Charles Frederick Warner, American rapist and murderer (15 January 2015), during execution by lethal injection. A grand jury report would later reveal that the state of Oklahoma had obtained the wrong drugs for his execution.

"A life is like a garden. Perfect moments can be had, but not preserved, except in memory. LLAP"
— Leonard Nimoy, American actor, filmmaker and photographer (27 February 2015), final tweet

"Okay."
— Alison Parker, American journalist and WDBJ reporter (26 August 2015), after being shot during the live broadcast by former employee Vester Flanagan before it was cut

"But when I leave this Earth, the only emotion I want to feel is peace..."
— Vester Flanagan, American journalist and perpetrator of the WDBJ shooting (26 August 2015), before he committed suicide

"On me."
— Joshua Wheeler, United States Army soldier assigned to the Delta Force (22 October 2015), prior to being killed in action during Operation Inherent Resolve

"Music has been my doorway of perception and the house that I live in."
— David Bowie, English singer-songwriter and actor (10 January 2016), to his friend Gary Oldman

"You're gonna have to shoot me!"
— LaVoy Finicum, American rancher and anti-government activist (29 January 2016), to Oregon State Police as they ordered him to step out of his vehicle. As the officers approached Finicum's vehicle, they saw him reach for his coat pocket and fired three shots, killing him. Investigators concluded that the reason Finicum reached for his coat pocket was to retrieve his 9mm Ruger pistol.

"Everything's going to be all right, old boy."
— Terry Wogan, Irish radio and television broadcaster (31 January 2016), to a priest who visited him

"I love you."
— Joey Feek, American country music singer and songwriter (4 March 2016), to her husband, Rory Feek

"They are outside. This is the end, commander. Thank you, tell my family and my country I love them. Tell them I was brave and fought until I could no longer. Please, take care of my family, avenge my death. Goodbye commander, tell my family I love them!"
("Они снаружи. Это конец, командир. Спасибо, скажите моей семье и моей стране, что я люблю их. Скажите им, что я был смелым и сражался, пока не смог больше. Пожалуйста, позаботьтесь о моей семье, отомстите за мою смерть. Прощай, командир, передай моей семье, что я их люблю!")
— Alexander Prokhorenko, Russian Armed Forces soldier who called an airstrike on his own position as he ran out of ammunition in a fight against ISIS fighters during the Palmyra offensive (17 March 2016)

"This is wrong what's happening. This is not a capital case; it never was a capital case; I had never intended to do anything. A lot of injustice is happening in all this. I'm sorry things didn't work out. May God forgive us all."
— Adam Kelly Ward, right before being executed (22 March 2016)

"No, my pain is too much, Fazila."
— Jo Cox, British Member of Parliament (16 June 2016); to her assistant, Fazila Aswat, who tried to help her stand after she was fatally shot and stabbed

"I fucking hate my life! Fuck it!"
— Dylan Noble (25 June 2016), before being shot by police officers

"Thank you."
— Bud Spencer, Italian actor and professional swimmer (27 June 2016), to his family

"You guys will always be my heroes."
— Buddy Ryan, American football coach (28 June 2016), in a letter to members of the Chicago Bears defense he coached in the 1980s.

"I wasn't reaching for it."
— Philando Castile, 32-year-old African American man (6 July 2016). He reportedly said he wasn't reaching for his gun before being shot by police officer Jeronimo Yanez shortly afterwards.

"Begone Satan."
("Va-t'en Satan.")
— Jacques Hamel, French Catholic priest (26 July 2016)

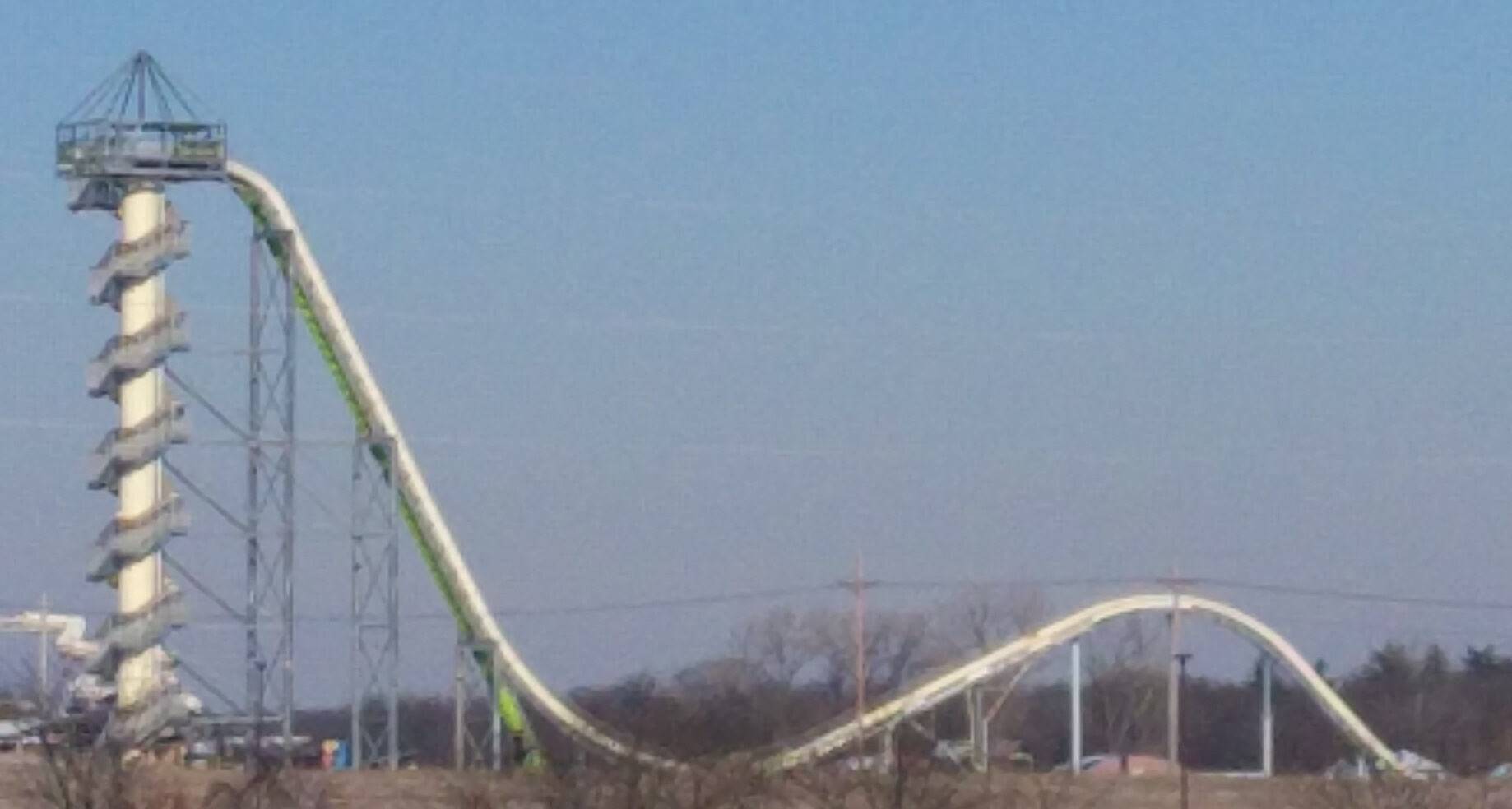
Verrückt water slide at Schlitterbahn Kansas City water park.

"I know, Dad."
— Caleb Schwab, 10-year-old son of Kansas state representative Scott Schwab (7 August 2016), in response to his father telling him "Brothers stick together" before Caleb and his brother rode the Verrückt water slide. Caleb was killed by a metal support of the ride's netting.

"I trust you."
— Gene Wilder, American actor, comedian, writer and filmmaker (29 August 2016), before dying from complications of Alzheimer's disease, to his wife, Karen Wilder

"I'm choosing euthanasia etd 1pm. I have no last words."
— Pieter Hintjens, Belgian software developer and author (4 October 2016), in his last post to Twitter, approximately an hour and a half before his voluntary euthanasia.

"I miss her so much, I want to be with Carrie."
— Debbie Reynolds, American actress and singer (28 December 2016), before dying of intracerebral hemorrhage one day after the death of her daughter, Carrie Fisher

"I humbly extend my sincerest of apologies to the families I senselessly wronged and deprived of their loved ones. The families of Dominique Hurd, Jerrell Jenkins, Cecil Boren, Michael Greenwood. I was more than wrong. The crimes I perpetrated against you all was senseless, extremely hurtful and inexcusable. I humbly beg you your forgiveness, and pray you find the peace, healing, and closure, you all deserve. ... I'm not the person I was, I've been transformed. Some things can't be undone, I seek forgiveness."
— Kenneth Williams (27 April 2017), right before being executed

"Tell everyone on this train I love them."
— Taliesin Myrddin Namkai-Meche (26 May 2017), after being fatally stabbed by Jeremy Joseph Christian in the 2017 Portland train attack

"This place is a bloodbath, it's a fucking bloodbath."
— Paul Lavelle (27 May 2017), on a recorded voicemail after being stabbed by his wife Sarah Lewis, before dying the following morning

"Goodbye humans... I'll miss you..."
— Randy Stair, perpetrator of the 2017 Eaton Township Weis Markets shooting (8 June 2017), in a final tweet after carrying out the shooting, before committing suicide.

"I'm dying."
— Justine Damond, Australian-American victim (15 July 2017), moments after she was shot by Minneapolis Police Department officer Mohamed Noor

"If you're not outraged, you're not paying attention."
— Heather Heyer, victim of the Charlottesville car attack (August 12, 2017), last post on Facebook

"Father, forgive them for they know not what they're doing."
— Gary Otte (13 September 2017), quoting one of Jesus' seven last words, right before being executed

"I'm OK."
— Hugh Hefner, American magazine publisher and founder of Playboy (27 September 2017); said to his wife Crystal while being administered antibiotics to treat a soon-fatal E. coli infection

"Death is so boring. So slow. One only waits for it."
— Robert Elsie, Canadian-born German Albanologist (2 October 2017)

"There are crooks everywhere now. The situation is desperate."
("Hemm crooks kullimkien issa. Is-sitwazzjoni hija ddisprata.")
— Daphne Caruana Galizia, Maltese journalist (16 October 2017); last words written before her death in car bombing

"Judges! Slobodan Praljak is not a war criminal, with disdain, I reject this verdict. I have taken poison."
("Suci! Slobodan Praljak nije ratni zločinac, s prijezirom odbacujem vašu presudu. To je otrov koji sam popio.")
— Slobodan Praljak, Croatian general (29 November 2017), during the pronouncement of the appeal judgment against him at the ICTY

"I'll miss you."
— Angry Grandpa, American YouTuber (10 December 2017), to his son Michael, shortly before.

"Where is your warrant? Not on the dead pig. I need a sheriff, no warrant."
— Matthew Riehl, American murderer and former soldier (31 December 2017), shortly before being shot by police

"I think it's fucking awesome. It sounds fucking terribly good."
— Dolores O'Riordan, Irish musician and lead vocalist of The Cranberries (15 January 2018), speaking on a voicemail to her manager Dan Waite

"Ooh-ee, I can feel that!"
— Anthony Allen Shore (18 January 2018), during his execution

"Remember to look up at the stars and not down at your feet."
— Stephen Hawking, English physicist, cosmologist, and author (14 March 2018), in his book, Brief Answers to the Big Questions

"The shedding of the soul is the last attachment, before it restarts!"
— Avicii, Swedish DJ, remixer, and record producer (20 April 2018), in Tim prior to committing suicide in Muscat, Oman.

"It burns, man."
— Robert Earl Butts Jr. (4 May 2018), during his execution

"Oh, it's taking rather a long time."
— David Goodall, English-born Australian botanist and ecologist (10 May 2018), dying by assisted suicide at the age of 104

"Not for long, I feel like one of my engines is going out."
— Richard Russell, American airport worker (10 August 2018), before crashing a Bombardier Dash 8-Q400 into an island in Washington

"It's good to be king. Wait, maybe. I think maybe I'm just like a little bizarre little person who walks back and forth. Whatever, you know, but..."
— Terry A. Davis, American programmer (11 August 2018), in his last video, "Terry Davis: Rises to Throne"

"God bless. Take care of my boy, Roy."
— Stan Lee, American comic book writer and publisher (12 November 2018), to his successor, Roy Thomas

"I love you, too."
— George H. W. Bush, president of the United States (30 November 2018), speaking to his son George W. Bush

"Hello, my brothers, how are you? Boy, I'm tired. I was here in Nantes taking care of things, things, things, things, things, things, and it never stops, it never stops, it never stops. Anyway guys, I'm up in this plane that feels like it's falling to pieces, and I'm going to Cardiff. [It's] crazy, we start tomorrow. Training in the afternoon, guys, in my new team... Let's see what happens. So, how's it going with you guys, all good? If in an hour and a half you have no news from me, I don't know if they are going to send someone to look for me because they cannot find me, but you will know... Man, I'm scared!"
("Hola hermanitos, ¿cómo andan loquitos locos? Hermano, estoy muerto. Estuve acá en Nantes haciendo cosas, cosas, cosas, cosas y cosas, y no terminás más y no terminás más y no terminás más y no terminás más. Así que nada, muchachos, estoy acá arriba del avión que parece que se está por caer a pedazos. Me estoy yendo para Cardiff, loco, que mañana sí ya arrancamos. A la tarde arrancamos a entrenar, muchachos, en mi nuevo equipo. A ver qué pasa. Así que, ¿cómo andan ustedes hermanitos, todo bien? Si en una hora y media no tienen novedades mías, no sé si van a mandar a alguien a buscarme porque no me encontrarán, pero ya saben... Papá, ¡qué miedo que tengo!")
— Emiliano Sala, Argentine footballer (21 January 2019), last WhatsApp message sent to friends before his death in a plane crash

"Hello brother."
— Haji Daoud Nabi (15 March 2019), greeting a fellow worshipper right before becoming the first victim shot and killed by the perpetrator of the Christchurch mosque shootings

"Reiwa is beautiful."
("令和きれいだー。")
— Wowaka, Japanese musician (1 April 2019), final tweet, four days before dying of heart failure

"As no document mentions me and no indication or evidence reaches me, they only have SPECULATION or invent intermediaries. I never sold myself and it's proven."
("Como en ningún documento se me menciona y ningún indicio ni evidencia me alcanza sólo les queda la ESPECULACIÓN o inventar intermediarios. Jamás me vendí y está probado.")
— Alan García, Peruvian statesman (17 April 2019), final tweet, one day before committing suicide

"I mean, hey, two wrongs don't make a right, but I mean, you know."
— Etika, American YouTuber, streamer, and model (c. 19 June 2019), in his last video, "I'm sorry"

"No!"
— Austin Howell, American free solo rock climber (30 June 2019), prior to falling to his death from Shortoff Mountain in North Carolina

"Still hanging around."
— Jeffrey Epstein, American financier and child sex offender (10 August 2019), last message sent to journalist Michael Wolff (Note: In May 2026, a federal judge unsealed a suicide note that Epstein allegedly wrote after his suicide attempt on 23 July 2019, 18 days before his death. The note reads as follows. "They investigated me for month [sic] — Found NOTHING!!! So 16 year old [sic] charges resubmitted. It is a treat to be able to choose one's time to say goodbye. Watcha [sic] want me to do - Bust out cryin [sic]!! NO FUN, NOT WORTH IT!!")

"I can't fix myself."
— Elijah McClain, American massage therapist (24 August 2019), after being put in a chokehold by an arresting Aurora, Colorado, police officer

== 2020–2026 ==
"I'm suffocating. I'm suffocating. I'm suffocating. I'm suffocating. I'm suffocating. I'm suffocating. I'm suffocating."
— Cédric Chouviat, French deliveryman (5 January 2020), dying while restrained by Paris police

"Mike can get it done."
— Kirk Douglas, American actor (5 February 2020), expressing his support for Michael Bloomberg's 2020 presidential campaign

"Save my son."
— Shad Gaspard, American professional wrestler (17 May 2020), minutes before drowning in Venice Beach

"Nearly 100 frank opinions every day. I couldn't deny they hurt me. "Die", "you are disgusting", "you should disappear" I believed these things about myself more than they did. Thank you, Mother, for the gift of life. My whole life I wanted to be loved. Thank you to everyone who supported me. I love you all. I'm sorry for being weak."
— Hana Kimura, Japanese professional wrestler (23 May 2020), last tweet before committing suicide (Note: Her last Instagram post reads as follows: "Goodbye. I love you, have fun and live a long time. I'm sorry.")

"My stomach hurts, my neck hurts, everything hurts ... Man, I can't breathe."
— George Floyd, American former restaurant security guard (25 May 2020), as Minneapolis Police Officer Derek Chauvin knelt on his neck for over nine minutes, asphyxiating him. Chauvin was later convicted for murdering Floyd.

"I, Ennio Morricone, am dead. So I announce it to all the friends who have always been close to me and also to those who are a little far away and I greet them with great affection. Impossible to name them all. But a special memory is for Peppuccio and Roberta, fraternal friends very present in the last years of our life. There is only one reason that drives me to greet everyone like this and to have a funeral in private; I don't want to disturb. I warmly greet Ines, Laura, Sara, Enzo and Norbert, for having shared a large part of my life with me and my family. I want to remember my sisters Adriana, Maria, Franca and their loved ones with love and let them know how much I loved them. A full, intense and profound greeting to my children Marco, Alessandra, Andrea, Giovanni, my daughter-in-law Monica, and to my grandchildren Francesca, Valentina, Francesco and Luca. I hope they understand how much I loved them. Last but not least, Maria. I renew to you the extraordinary love that has held us together and that I am sorry to abandon. The most painful farewell to you"
("Io, Ennio Morricone, sono morto. Lo annuncio così a tutti gli amici che mi sono stati sempre vicino e anche a quelli un po' lontani che saluto con grande affetto. Impossibile nominarli tutti. Ma un ricordo particolare è per Peppuccio e Roberta, amici fraterni molto presenti in questi ultimi anni della nostra vita. C'è una sola ragione che mi spinge a salutare tutti così e ad avere un funerale in forma privata; non voglio disturbare. Saluto con tanto affetto Ines, Laura, Sara, Enzo e Norbert, per aver condiviso con me e la mia famiglia gran parte della mia vita. Voglio ricordare con amore le mie sorelle Adriana, Maria, Franca e i loro cari e far sapere loro quanto gli ho voluto bene. Un saluto pieno, intenso e profondo ai miei figli Marco, Alessandra, Andrea, Giovanni, mia nuora Monica, e ai miei nipoti Francesca, Valentina, Francesco e Luca. Spero che comprendano quanto li ho amati. Per ultima, ma non per importanza, Maria. A lei rinnovo l'amore straordinario che ci ha tenuto insieme e che mi dispiace abbandonare. A Lei il più doloroso addio")
— Ennio Morricone, Italian composer and conductor (6 July 2020), writing his final obituary before dying in hospital

"Help!"
— Naya Rivera, American actress, singer and model (8 July 2020). Shortly after jumping into Lake Piru to go swimming with her four-year-old son, she told him to get back onto their boat. She helped him back onto the boat; moments later she yelled "Help", with her arm in the air. However, she disappeared into the water.

"It broke me, man, but we need to do that for them. People deserve abundant life, special moments. They've been through hell battling disease. If we were able to ease their suffering and bring joy for a moment, and hopefully moments (as) he goes through the bags, then we made a difference in his life."
— Chadwick Boseman, American actor (28 August 2020), his final text to a producer about sending a personalized message to a fan through the Make-A-Wish Foundation.

"Hey guys, I guess that's it."
— Ronnie McNutt, American United States Army Reserve veteran (31 August 2020), right before committing suicide by shooting himself with a shotgun.

"My most fervent wish is that I will not be replaced until a new president is installed."
— Ruth Bader Ginsburg, Associate Justice of the United States Supreme Court (18 September 2020), dictated to her granddaughter.

"I ask you to blame the Russian Federation for my death."
("В моей смерти прошу винить Российскую Федерацию.")
— Irina Slavina, Russian journalist (2 October 2020), last post on Facebook prior to committing suicide by self-immolation

"I don't feel well."
("Me siento mal")
— Diego Maradona, Argentine footballer (25 November 2020), to his nephew Johnny Esposito before he died after going into cardiac arrest in his sleep

"We messed up. We let our guard down. Please tell everybody to be careful. This is real, and if you get diagnosed, get help immediately."
— Larry Dean Dixon, American politician, Alabama State Senator (4 December 2020), dying of COVID-19

"I'd like to say I am an innocent man. I did not order the murders."
— Dustin Higgs, American convicted murderer (16 January 2021), right before being executed

"I love you. Take care of the boys."
— Larry King, American talk show host (23 January 2021), to his estranged wife, Shawn Southwick

"Well, I've got to be alive for it, haven't I?"
— Prince Philip, Duke of Edinburgh and Prince Consort to Elizabeth II (9 April 2021), talking to his son, then Prince of Wales, Prince Charles, about Phillip's 100th birthday, which would have taken place two months and one day after his death.

"For what, am I in trouble?"
— Daunte Wright, American man killed in police shooting (11 April 2021), when asked to step out of his car by police.

"I hope that I can be with Applejack in the afterlife, my life has no meaning without her. If there's no afterlife and she isn't real then my life never mattered anyway."
— Brandon Hole, American mass shooter (15 April 2021), last post on Facebook, less than an hour before carrying out the Indianapolis FedEx shooting which killed 9 people including himself. (Note: Hole's actual last words during the day of the mass shooting itself are unknown as a witness who reported hearing him yelling could not understand what he was saying.)

"Dear Team, well my time has come. I am eager to rejoin Joan and Eleanor. Before I Go I wanted to let you know how much you mean to me. Never has a public servant had a better group of people working at their side! Together we have accomplished so much and I know you will keep up the good fight. Joe in the White House certainly helps. I always knew it would be okay if I arrived some place and was greeted by one of you! My best to all of you!"
— Walter Mondale, American politician, former vice president of the United States (19 April 2021), final message to his staff.

"I love you too."
— Edwin Edwards, American politician, former Governor of Louisiana (12 July 2021) responding to his son, Eli Edwards.

"Thank you for seeing me just the way I am."
— Michael K. Williams, American actor (06 September 2021), in a video acceptance speech recorded prior to his death from a drug overdose, that was to be played for the National Congress of Black Women during a virtual event on September 19.

"No, no, no."
— David Amess, British MP (15 October 2021), while being fatally stabbed by Ali Harbi Ali.

"That was no good. That was no good at all."
— Halyna Hutchins, Ukrainian cinematographer (21 October 2021), after being mortally wounded by an accidental gunshot on the set of Rust.

"You shot me."
— Otis Anderson Jr., American football player (29 November 2021), responding to his father after the latter fatally shot him.

"Allen."
— Betty White, American actress (31 December 2021)

"Loved tonight's show @PV_ConcertHall in Jacksonville. Appreciative audience. Thanks again to @RealTimWilkins for opening. I had no idea I did a 2 hr set tonight. I'm happily addicted again to this shit. Check Bob Saget | Dirty Daddy for my dates in 2022."
— Bob Saget, American stand-up comedian and actor (9 January 2022), in his last post to Twitter, the night before he was found dead from a head injury in his Florida hotel room.

"Farewell."
— Vitalii Skakun, Ukrainian engineer and soldier (24 February 2022), last message to his operational unit on radio before detonating the explosives on the Henichesk Bridge during the 2022 Russian invasion of Ukraine.,

"You are being as thorough as possible as you try to kill me. How twisted is this? You worship death, don't you? Let's do this shit."
— Clarence Dixon, American murderer (11 May 2022), executed by lethal injection.

"Ali's been hit! Ali's been hit!"
— Shireen Abu Akleh, Palestinian-American journalist for Al Jazeera (11 May 2022), to her wounded colleague journalist Ali Samudi right before getting shot at the Jenin refugee camp by the Israel Defense Forces.

"Hello everyone, Technoblade here. If you're watching this, I am dead. So let's sit down and have one final chat. My real name is Alex. I had one of my siblings call me Dave one time in a deleted video from 2016 and it was one of the most successful pranks we've ever done. Thousands of creepy online dudes trying to get overly personal going, "Oh hey Dave, how's it going?" Sorry for selling out so much in the past year, but thanks to everyone that bought hoodies, plushies and channel memberships. My siblings are going to college! Well if they want to, I don't wanna put any dead brother peer pressure on them. But that's all from me. Thank you all for supporting my content over the years. If I had another hundred lives, I think I would choose to be Technoblade again every single time, as those were the happiest years of my life. I hope you guys enjoyed my content and that I made some of you laugh. And I hope you all go on to live long, prosperous and happy lives, because I love you guys. Technoblade out."
— Technoblade, American YouTuber and internet personality (30 June 2022), written as part of his final message on his father's laptop, eight hours before his death from stage IV metastatic sarcoma. The message was read out by his father in a video titled "so long nerds".

"Instead of thinking about why he [Kei Satō] cannot do it..."
("彼はできない理由を考えるのではなく...")
— Shinzo Abe, former prime minister of Japan (8 July 2022), delivering a speech in Nara before being shot.

"My sunshine."
— Olivia Newton-John, British-Australian singer and actress (8 August 2022), speaking to her daughter, Chloe Lattanzi; Lattanzi has implied that Newton-John lost her ability to speak some time before her death.

"Dear friends, I'm sorry to no longer be with you after 70 years together. But nature also has its own rhythms. They were very stimulating years for me that led me to learn about the world and human nature. Above all, I was lucky enough to meet people who helped me realize what every man would like to discover. Thanks to science and a method that allows us to address problems in a rational but at the same time humane way. Despite a long illness, I managed to complete all my programs and projects (even a small satisfaction; a jazz album on the piano...). But also, sixteen episodes dedicated to schools on environmental and energy problems. It was an extraordinary adventure, experienced intensely and made possible thanks to the collaboration of a large group of authors, collaborators, technicians and scientists. In turn, I tried to tell what I learned. Dear all, I think I have done my part. Try to do yours too for this difficult country of ours. A big hug"
("Cari amici, mi spiace non essere più con voi dopo 70 anni assieme. Ma anche la natura ha i suoi ritmi. Sono stati anni per me molto stimolanti che mi hanno portato a conoscere il mondo e la natura umana. Soprattutto ho avuto la fortuna di conoscere gente che mi ha aiutato a realizzare quello che ogni uomo vorrebbe scoprire. Grazie alla scienza e a un metodo che permette di affrontare i problemi in modo razionale ma al tempo stesso umano. Malgrado una lunga malattia sono riuscito a portare a termine tutte le mie trasmissioni e i miei progetti (persino una piccola soddisfazione: un disco di jazz al pianoforte...). Ma anche, sedici puntate dedicate alla scuola sui problemi dell'ambiente e dell'energia. È stata un'avventura straordinaria, vissuta intensamente e resa possibile grazie alla collaborazione di un grande gruppo di autori, collaboratori, tecnici e scienziati. A mia volta, ho cercato di raccontare quello che ho imparato. Carissimi tutti, penso di aver fatto la mia parte. Cercate di fare anche voi la vostra per questo nostro difficile Paese. Un grande abbraccio")
— Piero Angela, Italian science communicator (13 August 2022), writing his final statement

"If possible, please plasticize or vitrify my brain and leave it on a shelf somewhere with a plaque or durable sticky note that says, 'scan me.'"
— Peter Eckersley, Australian computer scientist, computer security researcher, Wikipedian and activist. (2 September 2022), written as a last message to his friends shortly before his death. His last wishes were honored and his brain was preserved by the cryonics organization Alcor Life Extension Foundation soon after his death.

"Just be yourself, Sarah."
— Queen Elizabeth II, Queen of the United Kingdom and other Commonwealth realms to Sarah Ferguson, the Duchess of York (8 September 2022)

"That's an awful lot of candles to blow out today."
— Tim Gough, British radio presenter and veteran broadcaster, reading out the daily birthday mentions on air (24 October 2022)

"Happy Halloween! The bats are out at Wayne Manor."
— Kevin Conroy, voice actor best known for voicing Bruce Wayne/Batman in Batman: The Animated Series, the DC Animated Universe and the Batman: Arkham series, among others (10 November 2022), written as part of his final tweet on Twitter before dying of intestinal cancer.

"Glory to Ukraine."
("Слава Україні.")
— Oleksandr Matsievskyi, member of the Ukrainian Ground Forces (30 December 2022), right before being executed by the Russian soldiers during the Battle of Bakhmut.

"No regrets — I had a great life."
— Barbara Walters, American broadcast journalist and television personality (30 December 2022)

"Jesus, I love you."
("Jesus, ich liebe dich.")
— Pope Benedict XVI, former head of the Catholic Church (31 December 2022)

"Mama."
— Tyre Nichols, American FedEx worker (10 January 2023), as he was beaten by police. He died three days later from his injuries.

"Fuck you, motherfucker."
— Richard Belzer, American actor (19 February 2023), last words according to Bill Scheft.

"I know I hurt people when I was young. I really messed up. But I know Ron DeSantis has done a lot worse. He's taken a lot from a lot of people. I speak for all men, women and children. He's put his foot on our necks. Ron DeSantis and other people like him can suck our dicks."
— Donald Dillbeck, American murderer (23 February 2023), executed by lethal injection.

"dropped two wts"
— The Titan submersible (18 June 2023), last message sent before all communications were lost, shortly after an implosion of the submersible, killing all five occupants aboard. The submarine was headed to the wreck of the Titanic.

"Thank you."
— Tony Bennett, American singer (21 July 2023), to his son, Danny

"Please accept my apology for not going public with what I've been facing the last six years. I have always felt a huge amount of love and respect from my friends, fans and supporters. I have loved you all so much and enjoyed making art for you."
— Paul Reubens, American actor and comedian who created and portrayed Pee-wee Herman (30 July 2023), statement he wrote before he died from cancer.

"I love you, mama. You're the best."
— Angus Cloud, American actor, most known for playing Fezco in the television series Euphoria (31 July 2023), last words to his mother before his death from drug intoxication.

"This ended up being a fun life. I am now going to a more free world. Goodbye."
("この人生は楽しい人生だったわさ私はこれから多分もっと自由な世界にいってきます...アバヨ.")
— Nami Sano, Japanese mangaka (5 August 2023), in her final letter she wrote before dying of cancer.

"Thank you for growing up well."
("잘 자라줘서 고맙다.")
— Yoon Ki-jung, Korean Professor Emeritus of Applied Statistics at Yonsei University and father of then-President Yoon Suk Yeol. (15 August 2023).

"Give me a kiss, I'll be leaving."
— Bob Barker, American television personality (26 August 2023), to his long-time girlfriend, Nancy Burnet, hours before his death.

"Have fun."
— Jimmy Buffett, American singer-songwriter (1 September 2023), speaking his final words to his sister Lucy.

"No, no."
— Aner Shapira (7 October 2023), before a grenade exploded in his hands while throwing them out from a bomb shelter during a standoff with Hamas miltants in Re'im.

"Unfortunately, they [the Israeli Air Force] have sent a warning notice to the Hiji building just now that it will be bombed. The area has been evacuated entirely. Women, men, the elderly, kids, have all completely fled the area." (Note: As of 10 October, the footage has not been released by Al Jazeera and the original Arabic is not available.)
— Saeed al-Taweel, editor-in-chief of Al-Khamsa News (10 October 2023), quoted by Al Jazeera shortly before being killed by an Israeli airstrike in Gaza City alongside fellow journalists Mohammed Subh and Hisham Alnwajha.

"Shoot me up with a big one."
— Matthew Perry, American-Canadian actor (28 October 2023), to his personal assistant, Kenneth Iwamasa, before dying due to acute effects of ketamine in his house in Los Angeles, California.

"Even if you escape the torment of history, you will not be able to escape the wrath of Allah."
— Hasan Bitmez, Turkish MP (12 December 2023), after calling the wrath of God on the State of Israel in the Grand National Assembly of Turkey before collapsing due to a heart attack. He would die two days later.

"I'm so scared, please come."
(".أنا خائف جداً، أرجوك تعال")
— Hind Rajab, five-year old Palestinian girl (29 January 2024), killed by the Israel Defense Forces during the Gaza genocide.

"You jump first, because if I jump with you, the helicopter will fall on all of us."
("Salten ustedes primero, porque, si salto yo con ustedes, el helicoptero nos caerá encima a todos.")
— Sebastián Piñera, former president of Chile (6 February 2024), to his sister Margarita and both a friend and his son, in his helicopter before crashing in Lake Ranco and drowning himself in the process; the other three survived.

"Your Honour, I will send you my personal account number so that you can use your huge salary as a federal judge to 'warm up' my personal account, because I am running out of money."
("Ваша честь, я пришлю вам номер своего личного счета, чтобы вы могли использовать свою огромную зарплату федерального судьи для 'разогрева' моего личного счета, потому что у меня заканчиваются деньги.")
— Alexei Navalny, Russian opposition activist and political prisoner (15 February 2024), responding to the judge at his court hearing a day before his death. (Note: Alexei Navalny's actual last words spoken during the day of his death, if any, are currently unknown.)

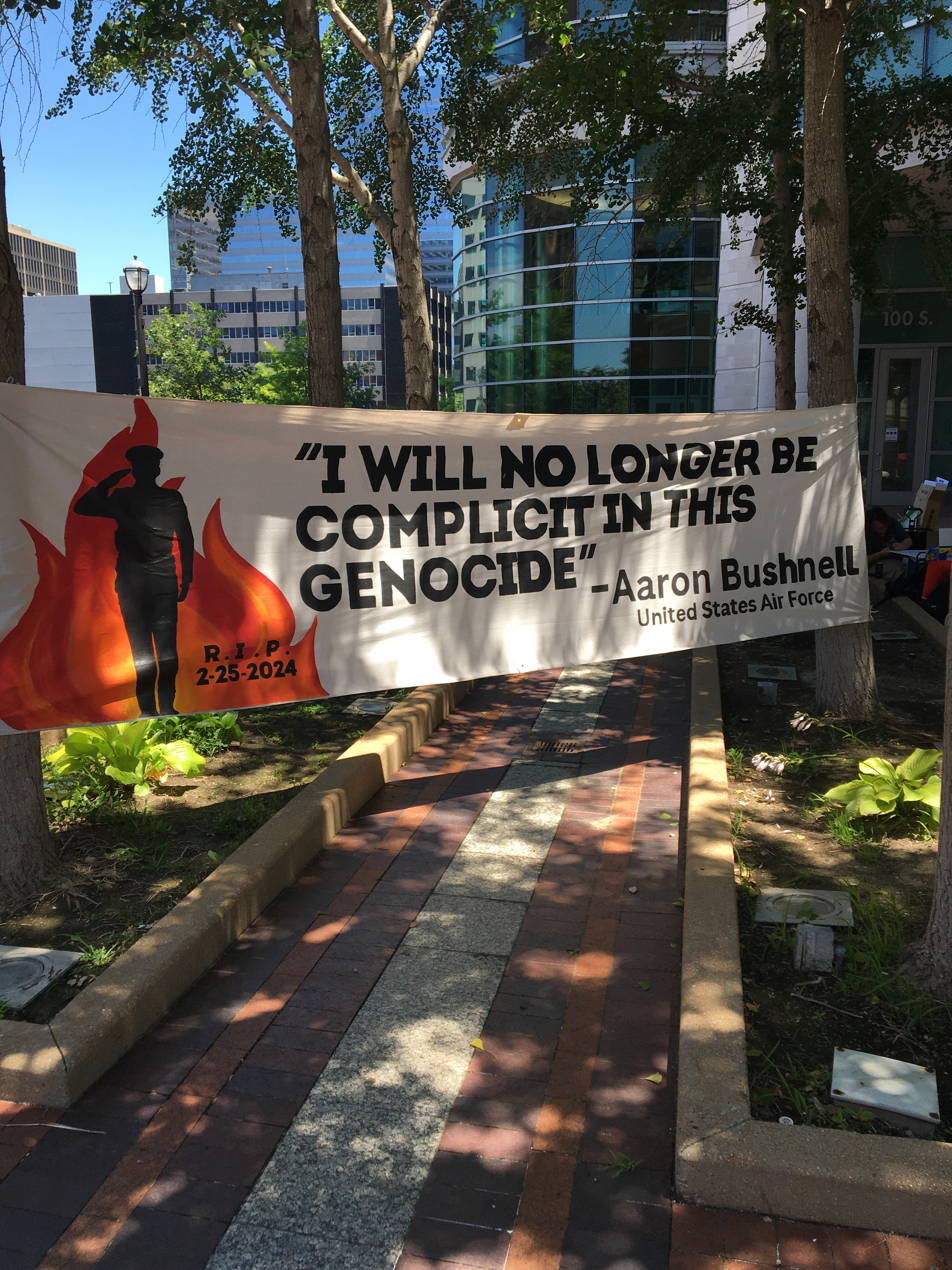

"Free Palestine!"
— Aaron Bushnell, American military serviceman (25 February 2024), who set himself on fire to protest United States support for Israel in the Gaza war.

"Finally, I would like to thank everyone who has supported me so far! I am not sure how much more I can do, as I am not very confident about my health, probably due to my lifestyle when I was younger, but I will try my best to create more interesting pieces of work, so please continue to support me!"
— Akira Toriyama, Japanese mangaka and creator of Dragon Ball (1 March 2024), who died of an acute subdural hematoma at the age of 68.

"I'm not able to get to Birmingham this year but will follow the game back here in the Bay Area. My heart will be with all of you who are honoring the Negro League ballplayers, who should always be remembered, including all my teammates on the Black Barons. I wanted to thank Major League Baseball, the Giants, the Cardinals and all the fans who'll be at Rickwood or watching the game. It'll be a special day, and I hope the kids will enjoy it and be inspired by it."
— Willie Mays, African-American professional baseball center fielder (17 June 2024) in a public statement on why he was not attending the MLB at Rickwood Field game between the San Francisco Giants and the St. Louis Cardinals on June 20. Mays died of heart failure the following day on the 18th, at the age of 93.

"Okay, I'm sorry."
— Sonya Massey (6 July 2024), unarmed African-American woman fatally shot in her home in Springfield, Illinois, by sheriff's deputy Sean Grayson. Grayson was later convicted of second-degree murder and sentenced to 20 years in prison.

"Get down!"
— Corey Comperatore, American former firefighter and project and tooling engineer (13 July 2024), who was shielding his wife and daughter at a rally for Donald Trump when shots were fired at the then former president. Comperatore suffered a fatal wound.

"It is Allah who gives life and causes death. And Allah is all-aware of all actions ... 'If a leader leaves, another will arise'"
— Ismail Haniyeh, Palestinian politician and Hamas leader (31 July 2024), hours before his assassination in an Israeli strike in Tehran.

"Excuse me while I go throw myself in front of a train."
— Sean "Dragoneer" Piche, American Internet entrepreneur, founder of Frost Dragon Art, LLC and owner of Fur Affinity (6 August 2024) at his last Tweet. He was commentative on healthcare in the United States as it was accompanied by a screenshot of an invoice of US$22,224.54 from the University of Virginia Health System following a biopsy Piche underwent for the undetermined lung disease that would claim his life a week later.

"If you came to party, make some noise."
— Fatman Scoop, American rapper, hype man, and radio personality (31 August 2024), just before collapsing during a performance. He died at a hospital the following morning.

"I ain't feeling good in my chest."
— Tito Jackson, American musician (15 September 2024), to his business associate Terry Harvey Maltbia.

"Scotland is a country, not a county."
— Alex Salmond, Scottish politician and former First Minister (12 October 2024), in his last tweet before his death.

"I used to be in a boyband, that's why I'm so fucked up."
— Liam Payne, English singer and songwriter, former member of One Direction (16 October 2024), in a conversation to a female acquaintance, moments before he plunged to his death from his hotel balcony in Buenos Aires.

"The decision to execute me on my birthday and six days before Christmas was a needlessly cruel thing to do to my family, but I'm very sorry for what I did and I wish I could take it back."
— Kevin Ray Underwood, American convicted child murderer (19 December 2024), prior to execution by lethal injection

"More often than not, things have turned out right for Izzo and his players. And he would be the last one to take the credit, even though the past 30 years have provided plenty of evidence that he almost always knows what he's doing."
— John Feinstein, American sportswriter and author (13 March 2025), from his final column, published the day of his death.

"I'm sorry."
— Ruben Ray Martinez, American man (15 March 2025) shot and killed by Immigration and Customs Enforcement

"I'm going to die."
("Je vais mourir.")
— Abisay Cruz, Canadian man (30 March 2025) who suffocated while being pinned by a Montreal Police Department officer

"I'm ready... It's been a while."
— Val Kilmer, American actor (1 April 2025), died of pneumonia in Los Angeles.

"Thank you for bringing me back to the Square."
("Grazie per avermi riportato in Piazza.")
— Pope Francis, Pope of the Catholic Church (21 April 2025), to his personal healthcare assistant.

"I'm sick. I'm dying. What do you want? I'm days from [turning] 90. I'm going. I am conscious that I'm in the departing stage."
("Estoy enfermo. Me estoy muriendo. ¿Qué querés? Estoy a días de los 90. Voy tirando. Soy consciente de que estoy en la despedida.")
— José Mujica, former president of Uruguay (13 May 2025), in his last interview on 3 May 2025, before his death from cancer complications, one week before his 90th birthday.

"I know there's a lot of questions that you need answers to. I promise you in the near future the questions will be answered and I hope in someway will bring you closure. President Trump, keep making America great. I'm ready to go."
— Glen Edward Rogers, American serial killer (15 May 2025), executed by lethal injection.

"I have swallowed something."
— Sunjay Kapur, Indian businessman (12 June 2025), after swallowing a bee, which caused him to go into anaphylactic shock and die.

"Your [sic] awesome!!!!!"
— Julian McMahon, Australian actor (2 June 2025), in a comment under his daughter Madison's Instagram post before his death.

"You started the band."
— Brian Wilson, American musician (11 June 2025), said to his bandmate Al Jardine.

"I fucking loved my life."
— Andrea Gibson, American poet (14 July 2025)

"Kiss me... hug me tight."
— Ozzy Osbourne, English singer, songwriter, and media personality (22 July 2025), to his wife Sharon.

"Study my brain please, I'm sorry. Tell Rick I'm sorry for everything."
— Shane Devon Tamura, perpetrator of the 2025 Midtown Manhattan shooting (28 July 2025); in a suicide note found on his body after the shooting, implying that he suffered from chronic traumatic encephalopathy (CTE).

"This is my will and my final message. If these words reach you, know that Israel has succeeded in killing me and silencing my voice. First, peace be upon you and Allah's mercy and blessings. Allah knows I gave every effort and all my strength to be a support and a voice for my people, ever since I opened my eyes to life in the alleys and streets of the Jabaliya refugee camp. My hope was that Allah would extend my life so I could return with my family and loved ones to our original town of occupied Asqalan (al-Majdal). But Allah's will came first, and His decree is final. (...) Do not forget Gaza. And do not forget me in your sincere prayers for forgiveness and acceptance."
— Anas Al-Sharif, a Palestinian journalist reporting for Al Jazeera (10 August 2025), in a posthumous note published on his Twitter account. Al-Sharif was assassinated in an Israeli airstrike on a media tent near Al-Shifa Hospital in Gaza City along with the rest of the Al Jazeera team.

"Counting or not counting gang violence?"
— Charlie Kirk, conservative political activist and author (10 September 2025), responding to a question about mass shootings in the United States before being assassinated by gunshot.

"I don't want to die."
— Regina Santos-Aviles, political aide to Representative Tony Gonzales (14 September 2025), committed suicide by self-immolation.

"I'm truly sorry. I can't bear this pain any longer. I'm burning inside, and I can't contain it anymore. Never in my life have I felt such pain and suffering — deep, burning, eating me from within. Please don't be angry with me, please. No one will ever understand me, and that's okay because you can't understand. I just want this suffering to end. I'm alive, but inside, everything is dead. Please remember the good, if you know me you know I am only good."
— Roei Shalev, survivor of the Nova music festival massacre during the Hamas-led October 7 attacks against Israel (10 October 2025), final post before committing suicide two years after the attacks

"That little black fella."
— Ian Watkins, Welsh singer and convicted child sex offender (11 October 2025), shortly before succumbing to stab injuries in prison, after being asked by officers who had committed the attack.

"The light of my life is finally fading. The fact that this message has been posted means that the time has finally come. I am no longer in this world. (I am entrusting this final post to someone important to me.) My life has been a series of battles. I kept winning. I have caused a lot of trouble, too. I am proud to say that I followed my beliefs and fought to the end. I have no regrets. However, I am filled with regret that I was unable to deliver a new work to all my fans. I am sorry. That's how it is. So it goes."
— Tomonobu Itagaki, video game developer and creator of the Ninja Gaiden and Dead or Alive series (16 October 2025), in a final message published posthumously on his Facebook page.

"Tell your mother I loved her."
— Dick Cheney, former Vice President of the United States (3 November 2025), to his daughter Liz, the day before his death.

"Please, brother, I can't breathe."
— Henry Nowak, British student (3 December 2025), after being fatally stabbed, and then handcuffed by police on accusations of racism from his attacker.

"That's fine, dude, I'm not mad at you."
— Renée Good, American poet (7 January 2026), speaking to ICE agent Jonathan Ross, shortly before being fatally shot by him.

"I had an amazing life. I gave it everything I had. If you got any benefits from my work, I'm asking you to pay it forward as best you can. That is the legacy I want. Be useful. And please know I loved you all to the end."
— Scott Adams, American cartoonist (13 January 2026), in a posthumous message read aloud by his ex-wife Shelly Miles while hosting his podcast Real Coffee with Scott Adams.

"Don't touch her! Are you okay?"
— Alex Pretti, American nurse (24 January 2026). Pretti was tending to a woman attacked with pepper spray during a protest before being forced to the ground and shot in the back by United States Customs and Border Protection agents.

"To all my fans, have a happy, happy Thanksgiving, and a great year coming up. God bless."
— Robert Duvall, American actor and filmmaker (15 February 2026), in a post to his Facebook followers, three months before his death.

"I don't age. I level up."
— Chuck Norris, American actor and martial arts artist (19 March 2026), on his last post on Instagram celebrating his 86th birthday, nine days before his death.

"I'm not afraid."
— Daveigh Chase, American actress (16 June 2026), as told to her boyfriend, Roy Hernandez.

"I could not take anymore the Facebook bulling [sic], fuck you!"
— Darrell Sheets, American storage auction veteran and antique shop owner (22 April 2026), from handwritten note discovered by police near where he was found dead from suicide.

"Received! Panic over!!"
— Ann Widdecombe, British politician (8 July 2026), acknowledging receipt of a Zoom link for her imminent appearance on talk show Matt Allwright, sent shortly before her murder.

"When you have to leave a production for personal reasons before getting to see the show open, and the cast and crew do stuff like this... Literally cried on the plane... little gestures go a long way when your heart is hurting... Love this group of misfits right back!! Happy opening, LEGALLY BLONDE – @trentinomusicfestival!! I'm so proud of you all. Knock their pink socks off!!"
— Josh Grisetti, American actor (10 July 2026), responding on Instagram to a farewell tribute from an Italian production of Legally Blonde that he directed, two days before his suicide.

"I am SORRY! THIS IS IT!"
— Alphonso Smith, American football player (2 September 2026), last post on Facebook before his death by suicide.

"Can you...you can't pull up?"
— Eliana Moreno, journalist for Los Angeles television stations KNBC (NBC O&O) and KVEA (Telemundo O&O), (15 September 2026), to her pilot, George Marciniw, before the news helicopter carrying both of them crashed and killed them both.

"This is my favorite ride, I'm so excited to be here."
— Hassan Jihad Ibn Kariem, teacher (12 October 2026), final words revealed by his brother-in-law prior to boarding the Goliath roller coaster at Six Flags Over Georgia and his eventual death after falling from the attraction.

"Ow, ow."
— Rachel Apa, 24-year-old athlete and runner in the 2026 New York City Marathon (1 November 2026), final text revealed by her father. Apa sent the text after passing mile 20; she collapsed near the mile 24 marker and later died in Mount Sinai Hospital due to complications from rhabdomyolysis.

"We're out of time!"
— Nathalia Gadelha Filgueiras, first officer and co-pilot of the 2026 Palm Beach County Learjet 60 crash (1 November 2026), final words as recorded by the Radio traffic between Filgueiras and ATC during the flight's final moments.
