= Highlands Ranch shooting =

Highlands Ranch shooting may refer to:

- Copper Canyon Apartment Homes shooting (2017), in which a police deputy was killed and 6 others were injured in a apartment home
- STEM School Highlands Ranch shooting (2019), in which a student was killed and 8 others were injured in a charter school
