= STEM School Highlands Ranch =

Charter school in Colorado, US

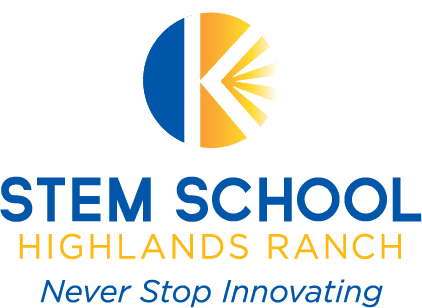

Location
- 8773 S Ridgeline Blvd, Highlands Ranch, Colorado 80129; United States; 39°33′22″N 104°59′52″W

Information
- Other name: STEM
- Type: Charter
- Motto: "Never Stop Innovating"
- Established: 2011 (15 years ago)
- School district: Douglas County RE-1
- CEEB code: 060741
- Director: Matt Cartier
- Officer in charge: Gabe Uribe
- Grades: K–12
- Enrollment: 1,399 (2023-2024)
- Average class size: 136
- Education system: Standards-based learning
- Campus size: 10 acres
- Campus type: Office park
- Colors: Navy blue and gold
- Athletics: Basketball, cross country, golf, lacrosse, soccer, volleyball, baseball
- Sports: Yes
- Mascot: Stanley the Spartan
- Rivals: Mountain Vista High School, Thunder Ridge High School
- Yearbook: Organized Chaos
- Website: stemk12.org

STEM School Highlands Ranch, formerly known as STEM School and Academy, is a public K–12 charter school in Highlands Ranch, Colorado, within the Douglas County School District. Its curriculum emphasizes science, technology, engineering, and mathematics (STEM) and uses problem-based learning.

The school opened in 2011 serving grades 6–9 and expanded to serve kindergarten through 12th grade by 2016. It adopted its current name in 2017. The school also offers a Pathways in Technology Early College High School (P-TECH) program, which combines high school coursework with postsecondary education.

== Rankings and Recognition ==
In the Colorado Department of Education's final 2025 school performance ratings, STEM School Highlands Ranch earned 84.6% of available points and received a "performance plan" designation, the state's highest school accountability catgory. The school reported a four-year graduation rate of 97.8% and dropout rate of 0.5% or less for the 2024-2025 school year. Its student-teacher ratio was 17:1 in the 2025-2026 school year.

In its 2027 rankings, Niche placed STEM School Highlands Ranch 43rd of 1,903 schools (top 2%) in its Best Public K–12 Schools category and 440th of 17,168 schools (top 2.5%) in its Best College Prep Public High Schools category. In Colorado, the school ranked third for college-preparatory public high schools, fifth for STEM high schools, and ninth for public high schools. Niche also ranked the school first in Douglas County for public K–12 schools, college-preparatory public high schools, and high schools for STEM.

In 2025 and 2026, STEM School Highlands Ranch qualified for U.S. News & World Report’s Best Elementary Schools, Best Middle Schools and Best High Schools award badges based on its rankings.

In 2025, STEM School Highlands Ranch esports coach Rachel Espinosa received the national PlayVS's esports Coach of the Year award. In the 2025 Front Range BEST robotics competition, STEM School Highlands Ranch’s high school team placed first in the BEST Award category and received the Spirit and Sportsmanship Award. The team was invited to the Denver BEST Regional Championship in Wichita, Kansas. The school’s middle school team received the Most Robust award.

In 2024, a student team from STEM School Highlands Ranch won the Colorado state championship and a $12,000 prize in Samsung’s Solve for Tomorrow competition. The team’s “Project Deer” used heat tracking, motion tracking, and classification technology to develop a prototype intended to detect wildlife and alert drivers to potential collisions.

== Academics and Activities ==
STEM School Highlands Ranch’s high school academic planning guide lists 28 Advanced Placement (AP) course entries and 46 concurrent enrollment courses across subjects including English, mathematics, science, computer science, business, and engineering.

STEM School Highlands Ranch offers extracurricular clubs and activities in technology, the arts, leadership, and recreation, alongside middle and high school athletics. At the elementary level (grades K–5), the school offers 25 clubs, including FIRST LEGO League, Minecraft Club, Battle of the Books, chess, and theater production. Recreational activities include fencing and yoga. At the middle school level (grades 6–8), the school offers 23 clubs, including BEST Robotics, CyberPatriot, Science Olympiad, MathCounts, student government, and choir. Athletic offerings include cross country and basketball, with additional activities in cheerleading, esports, and speech and debate. At the high school level (grades 9–12), the school offers 38 clubs, including honor societies. Examples include FIRST Robotics, National Cyber League, the Technology Student Association, the student-operated SpartMart business, and National Honor Society.

Athletics includes five sports: cross country, golf, soccer, volleyball, and basketball, with boys’ and girls’ programs in each. Additional competitive activities include cheerleading, esports, and speech and debate.

== History ==
The school originally opened as STEM School and Academy to 480 students, grades 6–9, on August 15, 2011. It was led by principal David Floodeen. A grade was added every year until they had grades 6-12 in 2014. That year, STEM finished its renovations and turned its gym into a two-story high school, containing a weight room, art room with kiln, and a chemistry lab. In the years since opening, the school moved from being ranked one of the lowest-performing in Colorado to number 10th in the state (SAT Scores). And ranked 9th in the country by US News, and World Report.

The board of directors wanted to expand, which resulted in the leasing and remodeling of the conjoining building and adding the first 5th grade class in fall of 2015. Grades K-4 were added in fall of 2016, officially making the school a K-12. Becoming a part of Koson Schools in 2017, the school re branded and changed its name to STEM School Highlands Ranch, adopted a new tagline, new mission statement, and new logo. In the fall of 2019, STEM School Highlands Ranch purchased the building that housed grades K–5. In the fall of 2020, STEM purchased the neighboring building to house its P-TECH program (Grades 13 and 14) and the Business Offices for STEM School Highlands Ranch as well as the Charter Network Main Offices of Koson Network of Schools.

On school grounds on May 7, 2019, a shooting occurred. It was carried out by two students from the school.

In the fall of 2021, the school finalized a master plan which includes four new classrooms, a secondary gym, middle school commons and a grand entry way. The planned finish date was in late 2022, but construction finished in early 2023. A grand opening ceremony was held on February 1, 2023, and students got their first look at the new secondary gym, weight room, locker rooms, gender neutral bathroom, middle school commons, FRHS storage spaces, and grand entry way. The new gym allows the school to be a part of CHSAA

== Campus ==
The main school buildings have three engineering labs, four computer labs, a chemistry lab, a weight room, two gyms (Secondary and Elementary), and three parking lots which encase the building on all but the north sides of the school facility. The eastern side of the school has a playground for grades K-5. The north side of the building has a recreation area with picnic tables where high school students can eat lunch. South of the elementary building there is a small building for the P-TECH college course, there are 3 classrooms primarily for P-TECH courses, however some high school level classes are held in this building.

== Notable Alumni ==
- Gitanjali Rao (Class of 2023), 2020 Time Kid Of The Year, Inventor
