= STEM School Highlands Ranch shooting =

2019 mass shooting in Colorado, U.S.

2019 STEM School Highlands Ranch shooting
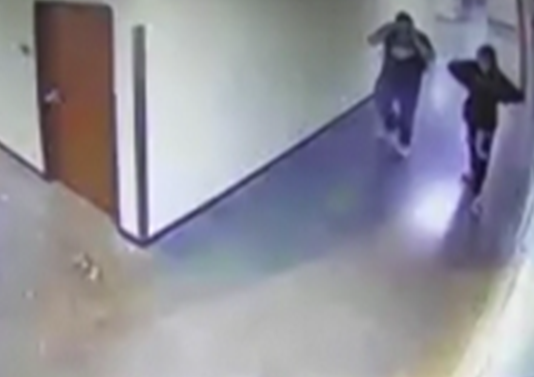
- Erickson and McKinney in the hallway just outside classroom 107

- Highlands Ranch (Colorado) Highlands Ranch (the United States)
- Location: 39°33′22″N 104°59′52″W; Highlands Ranch, Colorado, U.S.
- Date: May 7, 2019; 7 years ago 1:53 pm (MDT; UTC−6)
- Target: Students at STEM School Highlands Ranch
- Attack type: Mass shooting; school shooting
- Weapons: Glock 21 .45-caliber semi-automatic pistol; Beretta M9 9mm semi-automatic pistol (unused); Taurus 990 Tracker .22-caliber Revolver; Ruger 10/22 .22-caliber semi-automatic rifle (unused)
- Deaths: 1 (Kendrick Castillo, by Erickson)
- Injuries: 8 (4 by McKinney; 2 by Erickson; 2 by private contractor security)
- Perpetrators: Alec McKinney; Devon Erickson
- Defenders: Kendrick Castillo; Joshua Jones; Brendan Bialy
- Motive: Misanthropy; Retaliation for bullying

On May 7, 2019, two students, 16-year-old Alec McKinney and 18-year-old Devon Erickson, opened fire on students at STEM School Highlands Ranch, a charter school located in Douglas County, Colorado, United States, in the Denver suburb of Highlands Ranch, Colorado. One student, Kendrick Castillo, was killed and eight others were injured.

McKinney and Erickson were both convicted of dozens of charges and sentenced to life imprisonment. McKinney will be eligible for parole after 40 years.

== Background ==
The K-12 charter school held approximately 1,850 students. At the time of the shooting, it had no police officer assigned to it and used private security instead.

In December 2018, an anonymous parent reportedly called the Douglas County School Board of Education's director to express concerns regarding bullying and violence at the school. A district official wrote a letter on December 19, 2018, urging the School Executive Director to investigate concerns to determine their legitimacy and to take any remedial action that may be appropriate. The school has since filed a defamation lawsuit against the parent who had raised allegations suggesting that the school posed a risk of violence or a school shooting.

On April 29, 2019, an edit was made to the Wikipedia entry for the STEM School Highlands Ranch, stating that "anti suicide programs are implemented [in the school] to help lower chances of suicide and school shootings." The following comment was added by an anonymous editor on the same day: "Do they work? We shall see". KDVR described this as "a possible warning". The IP address associated with the edit was traced to Littleton, Colorado, which is near where the shooting occurred, and no other Wikipedia edits were attributed to that particular IP address. Eventually, the comment was removed from the page.

== Shooting ==
At 1:53 pm, Devon Erickson and Alec McKinney entered the school carrying handguns and other weapons hidden in a guitar case and a backpack. They opened fire in classroom 107, shooting several students from two doors located on opposite sides of the classroom. The school proceeded to announce a lockdown, and the Douglas County Sheriff's Office issued a warning via Twitter to avoid the area, describing it as an "unstable situation". Police responded to the school two minutes after the first 911 call and a bomb disposal robot was brought to the school after tactical gear was found inside one of the suspects' vehicles. A direct two-way radio link from the school to Douglas County Sheriff's dispatch center is credited with the prompt response; the STEM School is one of only a few so equipped.

Before the shooting, the students in classroom 107 were watching The Princess Bride in a dark classroom. Erickson was in the room and was sent to the nurse's office after he complained about feeling sick. McKinney, despite not being scheduled for the class, was also in the room to tell a friend to leave. Though McKinney was unsuccessful, a different person was told to leave the room, and they did. The same friend who McKinney intended to warn received a message from Erickson to meet him in the bathroom; he did not go. As Erickson was in the nurse's office, McKinney waited outside for him. Eventually, Erickson came out and returned to class with McKinney minutes later. While in class, Erickson sent a text to McKinney to start shooting. He then picked up his guitar case and walked to one of the classroom doors to seal it.

According to a student, Erickson pulled out a Glock handgun from his guitar case and yelled, "Nobody move!" Kendrick Ray Castillo then jumped on him and was fatally shot in the chest. Erickson was subsequently subdued and disarmed by two other students. He fired four rounds during the shooting, with the last shot causing the gun to malfunction. In total, he killed Castillo and injured two others: one of the students subduing him and a student in a neighboring classroom.

Simultaneously from the other side of the room, McKinney raised a Taurus revolver and fired it until it was empty, hitting four students. In total, he fired nine shots. After McKinney emptied the revolver, additional students tackled McKinney through the doorway. McKinney struggled with the students and the classroom's teacher until another teacher from the hallway walked into the commotion. Not knowing that McKinney was a shooter, the teacher picked up the revolver before going inside the classroom to move Erickson's handgun as well. Eventually, McKinney managed to free himself from the struggle but was subsequently locked out of the classroom. McKinney removed a Beretta handgun from his backpack with the intention of committing suicide, but he did not know how to release the gun's safety mechanism. A video camera captured McKinney attempting suicide and struggling with the safety before being confronted by a security guard, whose instructions to surrender McKinney complied with.

Officers did not have to fire at either Erickson or McKinney prior to taking them into custody. However, there was an instance of friendly fire during the response in which a private security guard reacted to the muzzle of a gun coming around the corner, which was later established to be held by a Douglas County sheriff's deputy. Authorities later confirmed that two handguns were used in the shooting, with three additional handguns and a rifle recovered. They also went to Erickson's home and seized a car with hand-painted graffiti that read "Fuck society" as well as "666" and a pentagram.

== Victims ==
One student was killed and eight others were injured in the shooting; two were as of 2019 in serious condition. On May 12 the last of the wounded students was released from the hospital. Officials told reporters at the time that the youngest victim was 15 years old. There were no staff deaths or injuries; all victims were students.

At least three students, 18-year-old seniors Kendrick Castillo, Joshua Jones, and Brendan Bialy, lunged at an attacker, later identified as Erickson. The three students jumped from their desks and slammed the gunman against the wall. The shooter fired off several shots as they struggled with him. Castillo was killed in the process, the only student killed during the shooting. Jones was shot twice, receiving non-life-threatening injuries in his leg and hip. Bialy managed to wrestle the handgun away from the shooter during the struggle.

=== Kendrick Castillo ===
Kendrick Castillo was an active member of the school's FIRST Robotics team. After the attack, the Colorado FIRST Robotics community has hosted the Kendrick Castillo Memorial Tournament (KCMT). It has been held annually since 2019 in his memory. As of December 2024 the former "Lucent Boulevard" in Highlands Ranch was renamed to "Kendrick Castillo Way" and in November 2025, there has been a memorial placed at a local park (Civic Green Park).

== Perpetrators ==
The two suspects, who were students at the school, were taken into custody in two separate locations following the shooting. Local media outlets reported that the weapons used by the suspects were stolen from a parent, and that neither were known to law enforcement prior to the attack. Some media outlets made an effort to avoid reporting the suspect's identities, in an effort to take part in the #NoNotoriety campaign, which seeks to avoid rewarding the shooters with recognition.

=== Alec McKinney ===
Alec McKinney, a transgender boy, was identified in many court records as Maya Elizabeth McKinney. He was 16 at the time of the shooting. McKinney said he had been planning the attack for weeks, targeting two students in particular as they had bullied and ridiculed him due to his gender identity and called him "disgusting". McKinney said that "he wanted the kids at the school to experience bad things, have to suffer from the trauma like he has had to in his life." McKinney also stated he has heard voices and has suffered from homicidal and suicidal thoughts since the age of 12, and refused to take medication so that he "wouldn't feel alone".

=== Devon Michael Erickson ===
Devon Erickson's mugshot

The other perpetrator was Devon Michael Erickson, who was 18 at the time of the shooting. According to an interview with one of the STEM school students, on repeated occasions, Erickson made jokes about school shootings and had even gone as far as to tell those around him, "don't come to school." On Snapchat, Erickson used the screen name 'devonkillz'. Erickson said he learned about the attack the night before through Snapchat. Erickson said that McKinney threatened him and that he followed McKinney's plan because he feared for his life. "The Voices Win" was found written in Erickson's house prior to the shooting. Erickson was booked on 30 criminal counts, which included one count of first degree murder and 29 counts of attempted first degree murder. He was held without bond pending his next court appearance.

Both suspects said they used cocaine before the shooting.

== Legal proceedings ==
After the initial court appearance on May 8, Erickson and McKinney were each charged with 48 criminal counts—including first-degree murder after deliberation, arson and burglary—at a May 15 court hearing in the Douglas County court. McKinney was charged as an adult—though his lawyers tried to move his case to the juvenile court, the judge denied the motion.

=== Alec McKinney ===
On January 2, 2020, McKinney pleaded not guilty to first degree murder and other charges. On February 7, 2020, McKinney pleaded guilty to 17 charges in a plea bargain with the prosecution. On the first degree murder charge, he faced a minimum sentence of 40 years to life in prison, but could be eligible for release earlier than that if he enters a rehabilitation program and earns time off for good behavior. Due to his age he could not be given the death penalty or life without parole. On May 18, Alec McKinney was sentenced to life in prison with a chance of parole after 40 years, plus 38 years for other charges.

=== Devon Michael Erickson ===
In March 2020, the 18th Judicial District Attorney announced they would not be seeking the death penalty for Devon Erickson. Erickson's trial began on May 31, 2021. The defense claimed that Erickson was an accomplice who was forced to commit the shooting. One of his defense attorneys said that he was a "confused kid" and "not a monster". McKinney testified as a witness for the prosecution, saying that he and Erickson had planned the shooting for weeks and that videos of McKinney berating Erickson were staged so that Erickson could claim he had been forced into the shooting.

On June 15, 2021, Erickson was convicted on 46 counts, including first-degree murder, attempted first-degree murder, conspiracy to commit first-degree murder and supplying a juvenile with a handgun. On September 17, 2021, Devon Michael Erickson was sentenced to life in prison without parole, plus 1,282 years. Erickson is incarcerated at the Centennial Correctional Facility in Cañon City, Colorado and McKinney is incarcerated in the Denver Women's Correctional Facility.

== Response ==
External videos
- Man Describes Scene After Shooting at STEM School in Colorado - NBC 9 NEWS

President Donald Trump issued a statement on Twitter the day after the shooting, thanking first responders for "bravely intervening" and writing, "We are in close contact with law enforcement".

White House Deputy Press Secretary Judd Deere issued a statement: "Our prayers are with the victims, family members, and all those affected" by the shooting, as did Republican Senator Cory Gardner: "The safety and comfort of our schools should never be taken away". Democratic Representative Jason Crow said: "... we have a public health crisis on our hands ... It is not enough to send thoughts and prayers ... We must pass common-sense gun violence laws".

=== Vigils, rallies, and memorials ===
Community gatherings were held after the shooting, which included an interfaith memorial vigil, a community service and dinner, and other memorials. During the vigil, a protest broke out and many students were heard saying "mental health". A large portion of the students walked out of the event, which was organized by a local chapter of the Brady Campaign to Prevent Gun Violence. The walkout occurred after the students listened to speeches from members of the community and Representative Jason Crow and Senator Michael Bennett, who were perceived by the students to be more concerned with gun control than on the need to support the victims of the shooting.

One student wrote an opinion piece critical of the vigil, saying "many who attended this vigil desired to exploit our pain to support political agendas" and that there should have been more focus on "honoring Kendrick, 18, who rushed the shooter and was fatally shot". Another interviewed shortly after the vigil claimed, "I understand calling for gun control but like these were handguns — these aren't AR-15s these kids are carrying. There's a law in Colorado you can't buy a handgun unless you're 21 – like how can you prevent that?"

Two days after the shooting, a small local rally for increased school security was held.

The Catholic fraternal organization The Knights of Columbus during their 2019 annual convention bestowed a posthumous honorary knighthood to Kendrick Castillo and presented his parents the Caritas Medal, the second-highest honor of the Knights of Columbus. Kendrick's father, a member of the organization, commented “Kendrick wanted to be a Knight because of what he experienced growing up and knowing the good that they did."

In August 2025, six years after the shooting, it was reported that a petition to open the cause for canonization of Kendrick Castillo to sainthood in the Catholic Church had been submitted by Reverend Gregory Bierbaum and Reverend Patrick DiLoreto of St. Mark Catholic Church within the Diocese of Colorado Springs, approximately 1.4 miles away from STEM School Highlands Ranch, of which Kendrick and his family were parishioners.

== See also ==
- Copper Canyon Apartment Homes shooting (2017)
- List of school shootings in the United States by death toll
- List of mass shootings in the United States in 2019
- List of school-related attacks
- List of school shootings in the United States (2000–present)
- List of shootings in Colorado
