= AdventHealth Littleton =

- AdventHealth

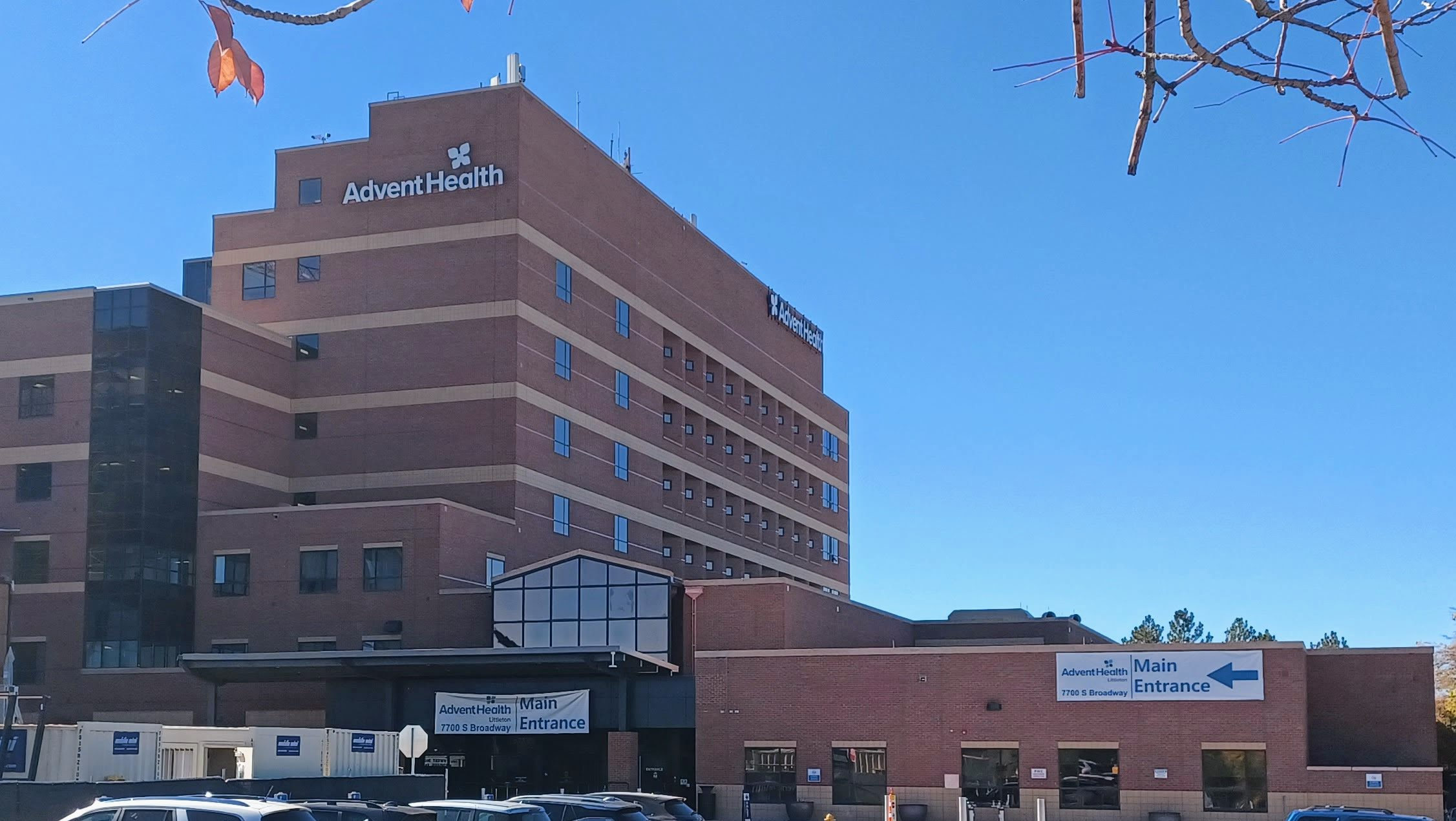
- AdventHealth Littleton in 2024

Geography
- Location: 7700 South Broadway, Littleton, Colorado, United States
- Coordinates: 39°34′45″N 104°59′7″W

Organization
- Care system: Private hospital
- Type: General hospital
- Religious affiliation: Seventh-day Adventist Church

Services
- Standards: Joint Commission
- Emergency department: Level II trauma center
- Beds: 231

Helipads
- Helipad: Aeronautical chart and airport information for CO16 at SkyVector

History
- Former name: Littleton Adventist Hospital
- Opened: April 1989

Links
- Website: www.adventhealth.com/hospital/adventhealth-littleton
- Lists: Hospitals in Colorado

Portercare Adventist Health System (doing business as AdventHealth Littleton) is a non-profit hospital campus in Littleton, Colorado, United States. It became part of AdventHealth following a merger with PorterCare Adventist Health System in October 2001. The medical facility is a tertiary, comprehensive stroke center, and psychiatric hospital that has multiple specialties. In April 2004, the hospital is designated a Level II trauma center by the Colorado Department of Public Health and Environment and it later was also recognized by the American College of Surgeons in October 2005.

== History ==
In April 1989, Littleton Adventist Hospital became the very first hospital in Littleton, Colorado when it opened with 82 beds.

In 1996, Littleton Adventist Hospital became part of the joint venture Centura Health when it was founded by PorterCare Adventist Health System and Catholic Health Initiatives.

In August 2001, construction began on a 130,000 square foot (12,000 m^{2}) expansion for $40 million to add thirty-two beds, two operating theaters and an augment radiology department and to double the size of the emergency department.

On October 1, 2001, PorterCare Adventist Health System merged with Adventist Health System Sunbelt Healthcare Corporation after approval from the Federal Trade Commission.

On December 6, 2004, Littleton Adventist Hospital announced that it would expand for $38 million, by adding three stories to its south tower. It would be adding twenty-four intensive care unit beds and thirty-two surgical beds, increasing the hospitals beds to 231. The expansion would be 85,100 square foot (7,910 m^{2}) and have shell space for future expansion. Construction began in February 2005.

In early November 2014, there was a groundbreaking for a oncology center on campus. It is being built for Seavest Healthcare Properties, LLC. In 2015, Little Adventist Hospital began a renovation and expansion project for $30 million. It renovated its lobby and its atrium. It also renovated and expanded its pre-operation and post-operation surgery rooms and interventional radiology.

In late 2017, the Colorado Senate passed a law requiring all hospitals to have their chargemaster on its website by January 1, 2018. The Centers for Medicare & Medicaid Services also required all hospitals to do the same by January 1, 2021. In early August 2022, Littleton Adventist Hospital still had refused to comply. To force hospitals to comply the Colorado House of Representatives and Colorado Senate both passed laws forbidding hospitals from collecting debt by reporting patients to collection agencies.

By April 2019, the hospital had one million patients visit the emergency department, it delivered 50,000 babies, and performed 165,000 surgeries.

On February 14, 2023, Centura Health announced that it would split up. On August 1, Centura Health split up with Littleton Adventist Hospital rebranding to AdventHealth Littleton.

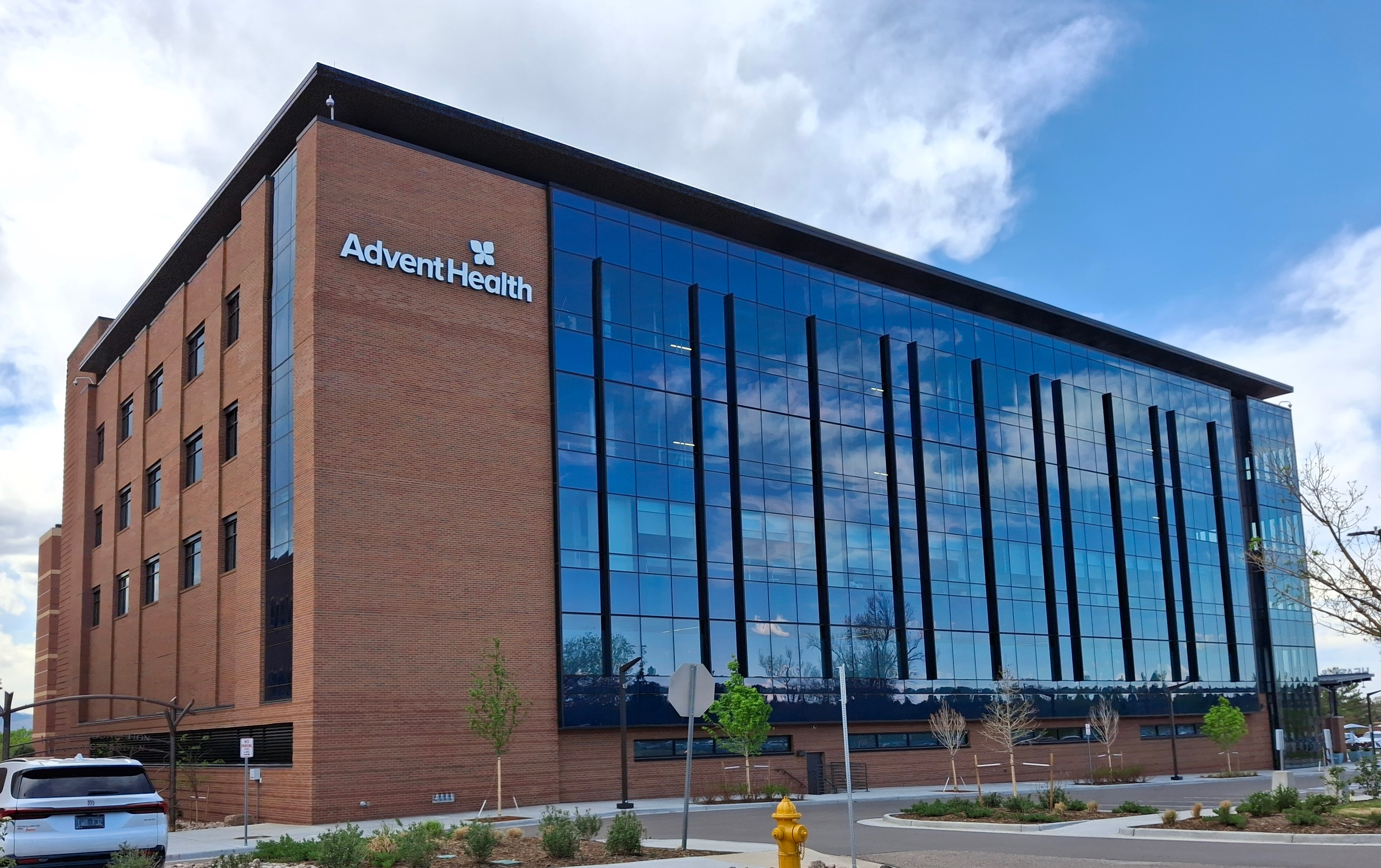
AdventHealth Heart and Vascular Institute in 2026

In early September 2023, construction began on a three story, 97,700 square foot (9,080 m^{2}), heart and vascular tower for $100 million. It would add twenty-four bed coronary care unit, cardiac catheterization laboratories, cardiac diagnostic department, operating theatres, pre-and post-procedural rooms, two hybrid suites, electrophysiology and interventional cardiology suites. Later the size of the tower was changed to 143,000 square foot (13,300 m^{2}) and it opened for $150 million on August 27, 2025.

On May 15, 2024, AdventHealth Littleton announced that employees had found thirty-one cremains from miscarriages, they were later buried at a local cemetery.

== Services ==
On April 29, 2026, the hospital relaunched its Forensic Nurse Examiner Program to treat victims of sexual assault, domestic violence, elder abuse and gun violence.

== Awards and recognitions ==
The hospital received a grade A from The Leapfrog Group from November 2012 to spring 2016, and from spring 2024 to November 2025.

== See also ==
- List of Seventh-day Adventist hospitals
- List of trauma centers in the United States
