= 2017 Copper Canyon Apartment Homes shooting =

Shootout in Colorado, U.S.

- Location: 39.5651°N 104.9490°W; Copper Canyon Apartment Homes; Highlands Ranch, Colorado, U.S.
- Date: December 31, 2017; 5:20 – 7:30 a.m. (UTC-7:00)
- Target: Sheriff's deputies
- Attack type: Mass shooting; shootout
- Weapons: .223 Remington Windham Weaponry AR-15-style rifle; .223 Palmetto State Armory PA-15 AR-15-style rifle; 12 Gauge Beretta 1301 Tactical semi-automatic shotgun; .45 ACP Springfield Armory XD45
- Deaths: 2 (including the perpetrator)
- Injuries: 7
- Perpetrator: Matthew Edward Riehl
- Motive: Unclear

The Copper Canyon Apartment Homes shooting was a mass shooting that occurred on December 31, 2017, in Highlands Ranch, Colorado, United States. One police deputy, Zackari Parrish, was fatally shot, and four others were wounded. Two civilians were also shot by the gunman, who was later killed in an exchange of gunfire with a SWAT tactical team. The perpetrator reportedly used two rifles, a shotgun and a semi-automatic pistol. Law enforcement had responded first to a noise complaint, then to a domestic-disturbance call to the apartment. During the second visit, the perpetrator barricaded himself in his bedroom and shot the deputies in an "ambush" style when they entered. The perpetrator was later shot dead by a police tactical team that subsequently re-entered the apartment. It was later determined that the perpetrator, former attorney Matthew Riehl, was a veteran with a history of psychotic episodes and he had recently stopped taking his medication.

== Background ==
=== Matthew Riehl ===
Matthew Edward Riehl (September 9, 1980 – December 31, 2017) attended University of Colorado Denver, graduating magna cum laude in 2004, according to his mother. He had joined the United States Army Reserve in 2003 before serving in the Iraq War as a combat medic whilst attending law school at the University of Wyoming, which he graduated from after returning from Iraq. He then went to work for a law firm in Rawlins, Wyoming for three years before leaving to set up his own practice. He joined the United States National Guard in 2006 reaching the rank of Specialist and serving from 2009 to 2010, again as a medic, in Kuwait and Iraq in the 300th Field Artillery Regiment where he didn't face combat. Riehl was involved in escorting convoys of troops 130 miles (210 km) through the desert at night.

After being honourably discharged in 2012, Riehl developed mental health issues; in March 2014, his brother phoned the police for a welfare check on Matthew and he later went to hospital for treatment. In April, he was in a United States Department of Veterans Affairs (VA) mental health ward having experienced a psychotic episode before he escaped and was later found and brought back. On June 9, 2016, Lone Tree Police Department (LTPD) responded to an altercation between Riehl and his father. On June 8, 2017, LTPD again met with Riehl to conduct a welfare check; they talked for 14 minutes and claimed to have seen rifles in his basement, but had no reason to believe he was a danger to himself or others.

After receiving a speeding ticket on November 10, 2017, Riehl filmed seven YouTube videos where he "ranted" about the incident and likened the officer who issued the ticket to a Nazi. He also sent at least 18 emails to the LTPD and the issuing officer for the ticket to be dismissed. Riehl became the subject of an investigation which concluded that Riehl had not threatened anyone and therefore his actions were not criminal. On December 12, a 'Hazard Hit' was placed on his address, stating that there needed to be a "Minimum 2 Car Response" from police when attending. The LTPD also concluded that he had post-traumatic stress disorder (PTSD).

=== Events leading up to the shooting ===
On December 31, 2017, at 2:58 am, Riehl called 9-1-1 to report a verbal disturbance. Deputies Zackari Parrish and Taylor Davis, and Corporal Aaron Coleman arrived at the apartment at Copper Canyon Apartments where they spoke with Riehl and the owner, Matthew Thompson, who was allowing Riehl to stay there. According to Coleman, he and Parrish walked up the stairs to the apartment where Riehl answered the door and came to speak to Coleman, while Parrish entered the apartment to talk with Thompson. Coleman described Riehl as acting "erratic[ly]". Riehl explained that he wanted to have called an ambulance because Thompson was acting strangely and believed he was having a PTSD flashback, and also because Riehl had pointed a laser in his face after he had approached him. After Riehl then attempted to return to the apartment, Coleman stopped him by placing a hand on his chest before Riehl began shouting, which he stopped after Coleman told him to be quiet.

Parrish returned from speaking with Thompson and joined Coleman and Riehl while Davis also arrived at the scene. They concluded that Riehl had not committed a crime and left the apartment at 3:44.

== Shooting ==
Riehl again called 9-1-1 in the morning of December 31 at 5:12. He reported that Thompson had been pushing him and wished to file a restraining order against him. The first officer arrived at the apartment at 5:17 and three others at 5:35. At 5:19, Deputy Parrish rang Thompson to find out if he was at the residence, but received no reply. Riehl exited the apartment at 5:22, but went back in after Parrish attempted to talk with him. Four minutes later, Deputies Parrish, Davis, and Michael Doyle went to talk with Riehl but he blocked the door to the apartment and recorded the officers with his phone. Parrish attempted to speak with Riehl who slammed the door. Parrish decided to place him on an M1 mental health hold and so the three officers backed away from the apartment to wait for two other officers to arrive.

The officers waited for approximately 20 minutes during which time they planned to make entry into the apartment and Parrish talked with Thompson over the phone. Once the other officers, Sergeant Dave Beyer and Deputy Jeff Pelle, had arrived, Parrish briefed those on scene of the situation. Riehl could be heard breaking things inside the apartment while Thompson arrived and gave them permission to enter the apartment. Davis held a ballistic shield, Parrish held a handgun, Doyle held a taser, and Beyer and Pelle held no weapon. They entered the apartment at 5:53 whilst shouting their presence to Riehl. Initially, they found it hard to enter as Riehl had barricaded the door with household items before they made their way through and asked Riehl to come out as they navigated obstructions inside the house. Three more officers, Deputies George Lekander, Jonathan Stauffer, and Nicole Holliday, attempted to rescue Parrish, however, while moving up the stairs leading to the apartment, they were shot at by Riehl through the wall and they returned fire. They retreated and found cover.

The officers attempted to gain access to Riehl's bedroom, at which time Riehl began firing rounds through the bedroom door. Four officers and two civilians nearby were hit. Three of the officers retreated from the apartment, but Parrish was unable to. He could not be rescued due to the gunfire and the other officers' injuries. As Parrish lay on his back, Riehl continued to shoot at him, before he left his bedroom and fired two shots at Parrish from a handgun at close range. Calls went out for assistance such as a SWAT team, medical response, and officers from other police departments. Meanwhile, Davis had entered further into the apartment when the shooting occurred and had jumped out of a second story window to escape.

Having retreated from the apartment, the officers waited for the SWAT team to arrive. SWAT officers Cleveland Holmes and Jason Friesen climbed up a ladder and entered another apartment in the same building as Riehl's, and they were able to see Parrish on the floor by looking through the peephole in the front door. The officers reported hearing gunfire coming from the apartment. Three SWAT officers, Ronnie Dorrell, Jacob Schuster, and Tom O'Donnell, along with Friesen and Holmes, entered the apartment around 7:30. Medic James Richter was at the rear of the group.

Once they had entered the apartment, the officers navigated through objects cluttering the floor. Riehl began firing on the officers, including with what Dorrell believed to be a shotgun. Dorrell then attempted to push the door to where Riehl was, before Holmes proceeded to kick it, causing a hole through which they could see Riehl. When the officers saw movement from through the hole, they began firing and Dorrell emptied the bullets from the Glock handgun he was using. At this time, the officers began removing Parrish from the apartment; their progress was hindered by the objects in the hallway. Additionally, during this time, the officers continued to receive gunfire from Riehl. Holmes then dived through the hole in the wall, followed by Friesen and Schuster, and they immediately attempted to subdue Riehl by placing weight on him and placing handcuffs on. The officers called for a medic to treat Riehl, but they were told that he would have to be moved to be treated.

Police later found that he had 15 weapons, including two rifles, a shotgun, and a semi-automatic pistol. Officers say Riehl fired almost 400 shots, many of which ended up in neighbors' apartments and adjacent buildings. 185 spent shell casings were found in the assailants apartment, and police counted 180 bullet holes in his walls, along with 47 bullet holes in neighboring units, "most" of which were caused by the assailant. During the incident, Riehl live streamed footage through the app Periscope. The videos showed Riehl saying he "would not hurt anyone except to defend himself", and that he had what he believed to be over 1,000 rounds of ammunition. The footage continued throughout the shooting.

== Victims ==
Following an autopsy at the Douglas County Coroner's Officer, Riehl's cause of death was given as due to multiple gunshot wounds. Three of the injured, including the injured civilians, were taken to Sky Ridge Medical Center in Lone Tree, Colorado, with injuries that were not critical. Another four were taken to Littleton Adventist Hospital in Littleton.

Deputies confirmed that Zackari Parrish was shot multiple times and died at the scene from his injuries. He had been working for the department for seven months having previously worked for the nearby Castle Rock Police Department. He was also married and had two young children. The funeral took place on January 5, 2018. The procession started at Plum Creek and finished at Cherry Hills Community Church and was accompanied by a motorcade.

Eleven officers involved were cleared for the death of Riehl, with the prosecutor stating that they had "acted in self defense or defense of others".

== Reactions ==
President Donald Trump extended his condolences to the victims of the shooting via Twitter: "My deepest condolences to the victims of the terrible shooting in Douglas County @DCSheriff, and their families. We love our police and law enforcement - God Bless them all! #LESM".

All 11 of the officers involved in the incident were cleared of Riehl's death, and it was officially determined that they acted "completely lawfully in using deadly force against Matthew Riehl."

== Media depiction ==
The incident was chronicled on the tenth episode of the first season of the Investigation Discovery TV show Body Cam, which plays footage from multiple body cameras, including those of Sheriff's deputies and SWAT team officers.

== See also ==
- STEM School Highlands Ranch shooting (2019)
- List of mass shootings in the United States in 2017
- List of shootings in Colorado
