= Suicide of Ricardo Alfonso Cerna =

2003 suicide of Guatemalan motorist

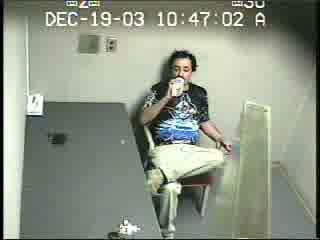
- Cerna drinking from a bottle of water shortly before committing suicide
- Date: December 19, 2003; 22 years ago
- Time: 10:47 a.m. (PDT)
- Location: San Bernardino County Sheriff's Office, Colton, California, U.S.; 34.10366°N 117.27286°W
- Type: Suicide by gunshot
- Motive: Facing a third felony strike and life imprisonment
- Filmed by: San Bernardino County Sheriff's Office
- Outcome: Disciplinary action towards the officers who failed to have Cerna properly booked
- Deaths: 1 (Cerna)
- Injuries: 1 (Parham)
- Burial: Montecito Memorial Park

On December 19, 2003, Ricardo Alfonso Cerna, a Guatemalan immigrant residing in Muscoy, California, committed suicide inside an interrogation room of the San Bernardino County police department. His suicide was caught on the room's surveillance camera and the footage would be leaked online in 2004.

Earlier that day, Cerna was pulled over for a traffic violation, where he shot the officer who pulled him over, San Bernardino County sheriff's deputy Michael Parham, twice in the abdomen, but the wound was not fatal. Cerna fled on foot but was arrested shortly thereafter. The authorities did not properly book him, nor did they notice his gun when they arrested him.

Cerna had previously received two felony strikes for drug-related offenses. As this was his third strike, he was facing life in prison. After being placed inside the interrogation room, he pulled a concealed .45-caliber handgun from under his pants, held the gun to his head, and shot himself. He died instantly. Some of the officers involved in Cerna's arrest and handling were subjected to disciplinary action by the department as a result.

== Background ==
Ricardo Alfonso Cerna was born on August 8, 1956, in Guatemala City, Guatemala. He migrated to Colton, California, later in life. He worked as a motorist.

== Incident ==
On December 19, 2003, at approximately 9:30 a.m., Cerna was pulled over by San Bernardino County sheriff's deputy Michael Parham for an undisclosed traffic violation. Cerna proceeded to drive away in an attempt to flee the scene. He then exited the vehicle and pulled out a firearm and shot a total of six shots, two hitting Deputy Parham in the abdomen, before fleeing on foot. Cerna was soon arrested and placed inside a police car; however, none of the deputies had searched him, believing that the police officers had already done so and found no weapon. Cerna was placed in an interrogation room at approximately 10:46 a.m. in preparation for questioning by the head of the San Bernardino County homicide unit Bobby Dean.

Cerna had a lengthy criminal record for offenses including possession of narcotics, and received two felony strikes for a couple of these offenses, serving prison time in the process. As this was his third strike, he was facing life in prison. He asked Officer Dean for a bottle of water. When Cerna received the water, Officer Dean left the room to speak with a detective in the hallway. While breathing heavily, Cerna took a few sips from the bottle of water, before pulling out a concealed .45-caliber handgun from under the waistband of his pants, holding it against his head, and shooting himself. He died instantly. As Officer Dean re-entered the room, he exclaimed, "Oh fuck," as he put his coffee down on the table and surveyed the scene for a moment. A second officer inquired, "Where did he get it?" and Officer Dean responded with, "Nobody shook him." Officer Dean then calmly retrieved the keys and sunglasses and left the room, dismayed over the situation.

=== Leaked video footage ===
Soon after, a ranking official at the department was authorized to show the video during a presentation on police safety at a federal training academy in Quantico, Virginia. Following the presentation, dozens of copies of the video were made at the request of law enforcement agencies across the country, who wanted the copies for training purposes. Although access was limited, the video was leaked online in early 2004. The person who leaked the footage was never identified by authorities.

== Aftermath ==
Deputy Parham underwent surgery at the Loma Linda University Medical Center and was listed in critical but stable condition in intensive care. He made a full recovery and was eventually released. Some of the officers involved in Cerna's arrest and handling were subjected to disciplinary action by the department's lead sheriff Gary Penrod, who said that since Cerna was never checked for weapons, he could have shot and potentially killed deputies in the station had he not decided to commit suicide. Department officials would not comment on the specifics of said action or identify the officers involved.

Word quickly spread about the incident to members of the press. Sheriff Penrod told a reporter that the deputies failed to adequately search Cerna before he was taken into custody and again when he was transferred to the homicide division office, and that each receiving deputy may have wrongly assumed the previous officer adequately searched him. Penrod said confusion among the three agencies involved—the Highway Patrol, San Bernardino police and the Sheriff's Department—may have contributed to the oversight.

=== Misinformation and conspiracy theories ===
Conspiracy theories spread online that Cerna was rather killed by the police department, that one of the officers present gave him the gun and urged him to commit suicide with it. These conspiracies were quickly debunked by the police department.
