= Murder of Paul Lavelle =

2017 stabbing of a man in England

- Location: Seaforth, Merseyside
- Date: 27 May 2017; 9 years ago c. 20:46 pm (BST)
- Attack type: Stabbing; domestic violence; androcide
- Weapon: Jagged shard of a broken dinner plate
- Deaths: Paul Lavelle
- Motive: Jealousy, triggered by Lavelle communicating with another woman on Plenty of Fish
- Convicted: Sarah Lewis

On 27 May 2017, Paul Lavelle, a 50-year-old Rock Ferry man, was fatally stabbed by his 46-year-old girlfriend with a jagged shard of broken dinner plate during a drunken dispute at his home in Seaforth, Merseyside, United Kingdom. Authorities confirmed that Lavelle's girlfriend, Sarah Lewis, stabbed him multiple times with the broken plate. Despite the severity of the injury, Lavelle did not call for help and was found deceased the next morning.

The stabbing became national headlines across England, and following his death, Lavelle's friends established the Paul Lavelle Foundation to raise awareness of worldwide misandry, domestic abuse against men, and violence against men.

== Stabbing ==
The stabbing occurred during the evening at Lavelle's home in Seaforth, where he was reported intoxicated. His girlfriend, Sarah Lewis, got into an argument with Lavelle after reporting that Lavelle had been communicating with another woman on the Canadian dating site Plenty of Fish. Lewis destroyed a plate and fatally stabbed Lavelle multiple times with the jagged shard. Lewis then took several photographs of her boyfriend's injured face in his bedroom. After Lewis stabbed Lavelle, Lewis left the house. Lavelle attempted to call Lewis on seven occasions as he lay bleeding, but each call was diverted to voicemail. He immediately left a voicemail on a phone belonging to a business customer, which recorded him saying, "This place is a bloodbath, it's a fucking bloodbath".

Lavelle managed to get up from the floor and walk around while bleeding. When police arrived the following morning, officers discovered the blood throughout his house, including his car outside. After reaching upstairs, Lavelle was found deceased, slumped on the bathroom floor. He suffered a nostril-to-cheek wound from the shard that severed an artery. It was also reported that Lewis left his residence after the attack and spent the night at her sister's house, only returning the next morning to call 999. Lewis was immediately arrested and charged with murder.

== Aftermath ==
Following Lavelle's death, Lavelle's friends and family, alongside 50 other men, channeled their grief into creating a foundation named after Lavelle. They established the Paul Lavelle Foundation in Rock Ferry, a foundation to raise awareness of male violence. Supporters often engage in public activities including the "Snowdon hike" and "Liverpool to Chester" bike rides to raise visibility. Paul's brother and mother were interviewed by ITV Granada dozens of times, with his brother urging other men to "break their silence". His brother added that they need a goal to turn a private tragedy into a public conversation about the stigma surrounding male victims.

In February 2019, the Paul Lavelle Foundation opened a hub at the Royal Standard House in Lavelle's hometown of Rock Ferry, that offers support to men who have suffered domestic abuse. The original hub closed on 5 February 2026 because of unforeseen circumstances, and was relocated to premises near the Birkenhead Park Rugby Club in Birkenhead.

On 18 March 2024, Channel 5 aired a special documentary titled My Wife My Abuser: The Secret Footage, which explains the story of a similar tragic event involving Richard Spencer, a 47-year-old husband who was abused multiple times by his 46-year-old wife Sheree Spencer. The documentary demonstrated how Sharee subjected Richard to physical, mental, and emotional abuse throughout their 20-year relationship with his wife while in their home near York. Following the release of the special, the Paul Lavelle Foundation spoke to the Wirral Globe out about the importance of such a television program being aired. Paul Gladwell, the founder of the foundation, made the following statement in response to the television special:

The programme was deeply upsetting for everyone connected with the foundation given our own experiences with what happened to our friend Paul. It's had a hard-hitting effect with so many as we can see with comments made on all our posts on the programme. What is striking for me personally is how many are quite shocked that this can happen to a man. It's quite clear that far too many people are still unaware of the fact one in three victims of domestic abuse are male and that is what are foundation is fighting to change along with many other male support groups like Mankind Initiative who have been supporting Richard as he moves his life to a better place.

In an exclusive interview with Daily Mirror, his grief-stricken family replied that they believe pride stopped their son admitting he was being "beaten up by a girl" and getting help.

== Conviction ==
Before Lewis pleaded guilty in January 2018, the jury ruled that the stabbing was "no accident". After pleading guilty at Liverpool Crown Court, Lewis was sentenced to nearly eight years in prison on 25 January 2018.
