= National Register of Historic Places listings in Harrisonburg, Virginia =

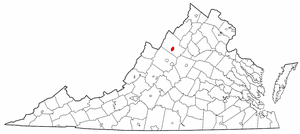
Location of Harrisonburg in Virginia

This is a list of the National Register of Historic Places listings in Harrisonburg, Virginia.

This is intended to be a complete list of the properties and districts on the National Register of Historic Places in the independent city of Harrisonburg, Virginia, United States. The locations of National Register properties and districts for which the latitude and longitude coordinates are included below, may be seen in an online map.

There are 14 properties and districts listed on the National Register in the city. Another property was once listed but has been removed.

This National Park Service list is complete through NPS recent listings posted August 28, 2026.

== Current listings ==
	Name on the Register	Image	Date listed	Location	Description
1	Turner Ashby Monument	Turner Ashby Monument	June 12, 2017 (#100001080)	1164 Turner Ashby Ln. 38°25′23″N 78°51′53″W	
2	Bethel AME Church and Dallard-Newman House Historic District	Bethel AME Church and Dallard-Newman House Historic District	November 24, 2017 (#100001851)	184-192 Kelley St. 38°27′16″N 78°51′42″W	
3	George Earman House	George Earman House	July 15, 1982 (#82004594)	109 Pleasant Hill Rd. 38°25′38″N 78°53′54″W	
4	Ida Mae Francis Tourist Home		September 9, 2024 (#100010805)	252 North Mason Street; 38°27′07″N 78°51′56″W	
5	Thomas Harrison House	Thomas Harrison House	July 26, 1973 (#73002213)	30 W. Bruce St. 38°26′51″N 78°52′10″W	
6	Harrisonburg Downtown Historic District	Harrisonburg Downtown Historic District	January 19, 2005 (#04001536)	Main St. and adjacent areas between Kratzer Ave. and Grace St.; also 245 and 240 Old South High St. 38°26′56″N 78°52′08″W	Second set of addresses represent a boundary increase approved April 30, 2018.
7	Anthony Hockman House	Anthony Hockman House	July 8, 1982 (#82004565)	E. Market and Broad Sts. 38°26′56″N 78°51′53″W	
8	Newtown Cemetery	Newtown Cemetery	February 17, 2015 (#15000014)	Roughly bounded by Kelley, Hill, Sterling, and Gay Sts. 38°26′52″N 78°51′49″W	
9	Old Town Historic District	Old Town Historic District	February 14, 2008 (#08000026)	Roughly bounded by Cantrell Ave. and Ott, Water, and S. Main Sts. 38°26′42″N 78°52′04″W	
10	Rockingham County Courthouse	Rockingham County Courthouse	September 16, 1982 (#82004566)	Courthouse Square; 38°26′58″N 78°52′08″W	
11	Lucy F. Simms School	Lucy F. Simms School	February 11, 2004 (#04000040)	620 Simms Ave. 38°27′16″N 78°51′28″W	
12	Whitesel Brothers	Whitesel Brothers	May 18, 2005 (#05000472)	131 W. Grace St. 38°26′36″N 78°52′40″W	
13	United States Post Office and Court House	United States Post Office and Court House	September 18, 2018 (#100002992)	116 N. Main St. 38°27′02″N 78°52′05″W	
14	Joshua Wilton House	Joshua Wilton House	May 24, 1979 (#79003281)	412 S. Main St. 38°26′43″N 78°52′10″W	

== Former listing ==
	Name on the Register	Image	Date listed	Date removed	Location	City or town	Description
1	Morrison House	Morrison House	September 22, 1971 (#71001054)	September 28, 1982	W. Market and N. Liberty Sts.	Harrisonburg	Demolished February 1982

== See also ==
- List of National Historic Landmarks in Virginia
- National Register of Historic Places listings in Virginia
- National Register of Historic Places listings in Rockingham County, Virginia
