= Harrisonburg Downtown Historic District =

Historic district in Virginia, United States

- U.S. National Register of Historic Places
- U.S. Historic district
- Virginia Landmarks Register
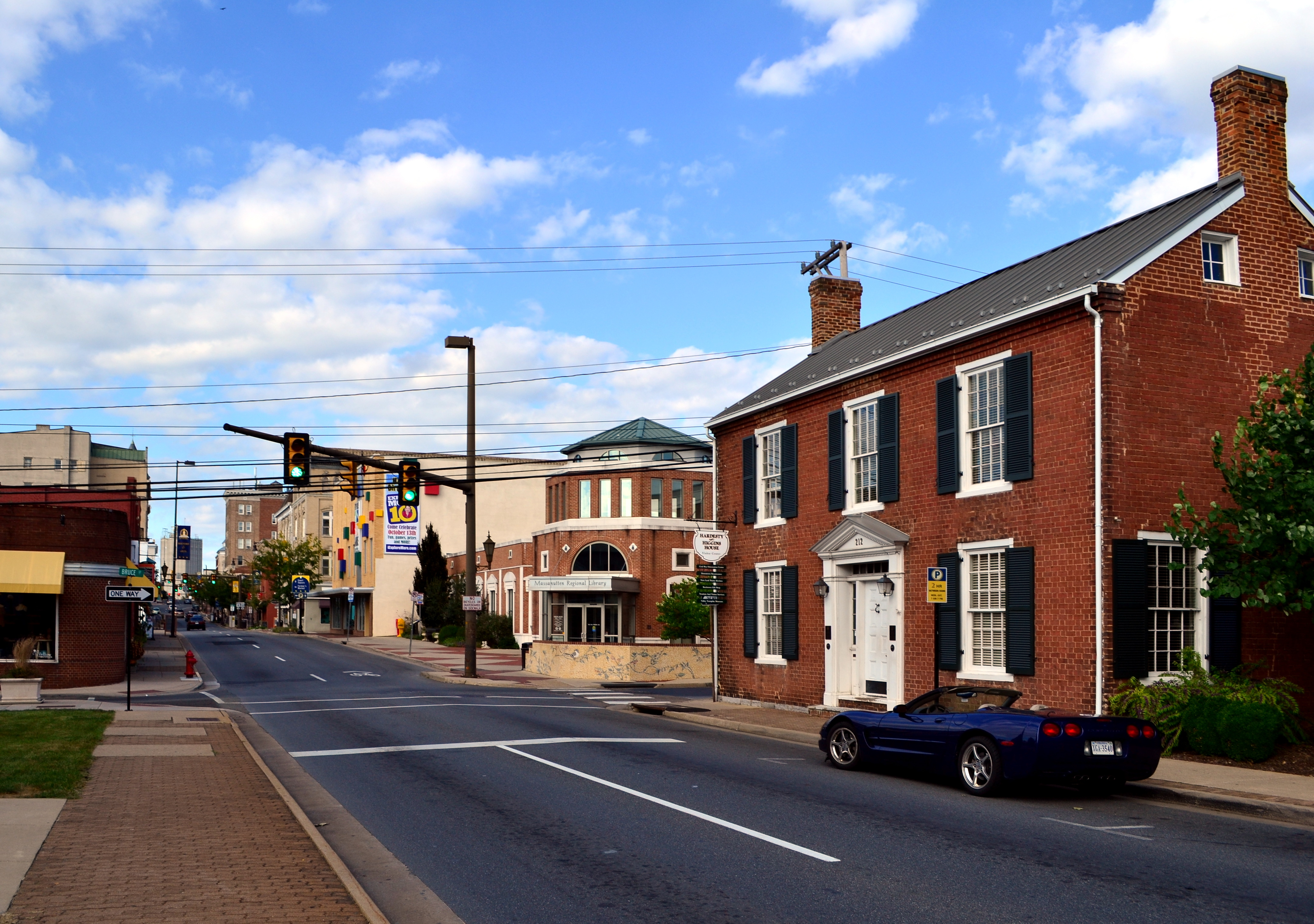
- Harrisonburg Downtown Historic District, Bruce and Main Street, September 2013

- Location within Virginia Location within the United States
- Location: Main St. and adj. areas bet. Kratzer Ave., and Grace St., Harrisonburg, Virginia
- Coordinates: 38°26′48″N 78°52′05″W
- Area: 100 acres (40 ha)
- Built: 1779
- Architectural style: Greek Revival, Queen Anne, et al.
- NRHP reference No.: 04001536
- VLR No.: 115-0187

Significant dates
- Added to NRHP: January 19, 2005
- Designated VLR: December 1, 2004

Harrisonburg Downtown Historic District is a national historic district located at Harrisonburg, Virginia. The district encompasses 161 contributing buildings, 1 contributing structure, and 2 contributing objects in the central business district of Harrisonburg. The district includes a variety of commercial, residential, institutional, and governmental buildings dating from the late-18th to mid-20th century. There are notable examples of the Queen Anne and Greek Revival styles.

It was listed on the National Register of Historic Places in 2005.

== Notable buildings ==
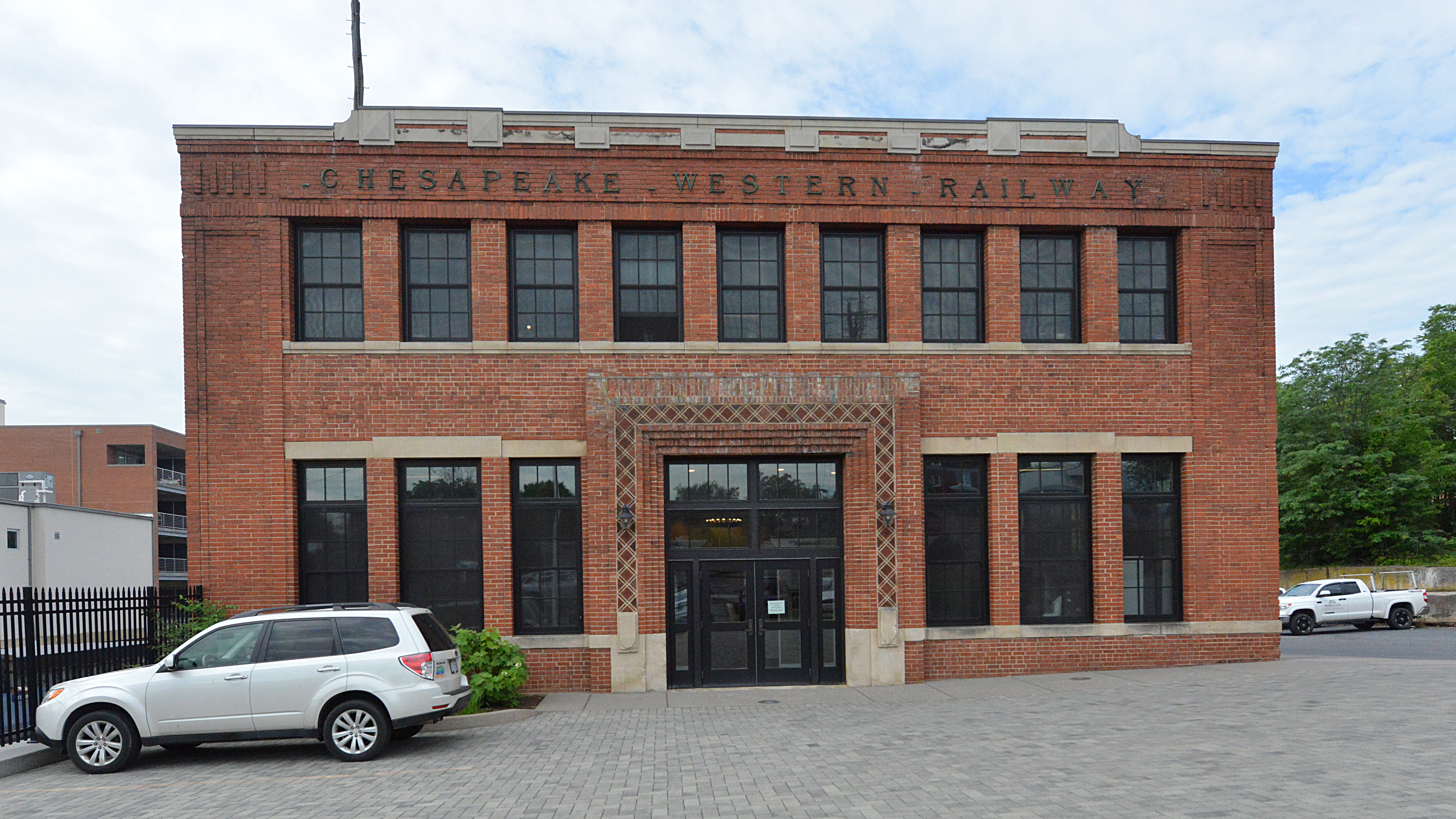
Chesapeake Western Railway terminal, Harrisonburg, VA

Chesapeake Western Railway Station (1913) is a brick building with two sections, the tow-story front section contains a passenger and office area while the one-story rear section was built for freight. Trim, belt courses, window sills, and lintels on the facade are made of Indiana limestone. The main entrance is ornamented with red-tinted concrete with a crosshatched surface. The building was damaged by fire 1982 and in the 1990's the building was rented out as warehouse space. The building was refurbished as office space and tenants occupied it in July 2016.

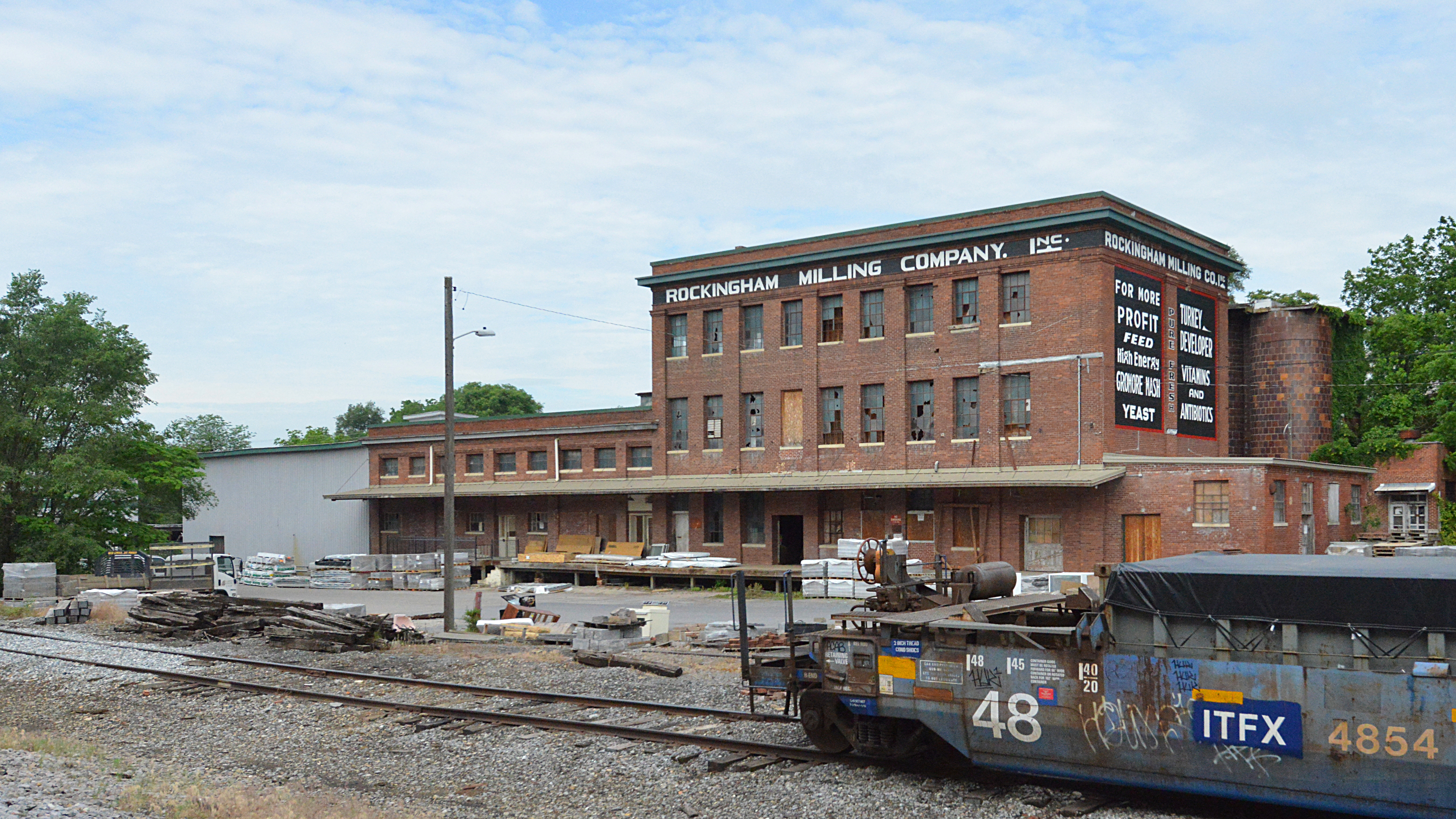
Rockingham Milling Company main mill building

Rockingham Milling Co buildings: Rockingham Milling Co was founded in 1919 and began production of flour and feed in 1921. The main building is a three-story brick roller mill built in 1920. The north side has a black and white advertising sign originally painted in the 1920s or early 1930s and repainted over time. in 1923 a two-story brick warehouse was added on the south end. That warehouse was extended in the late 20th century by a prefab metal building on a concrete foundation. Behind the building is a quartet of cylindrical glazed tile block grain bins that date to the 1920s.

Other notable buildings include Joseph Ney's Department Store (1951), First Presbyterian Church, Grattan Building (1870s), Hess Furniture Building, Octagon House, and the Maude Snyder House (c. 1900).

Located in the district and separately listed are Rockingham County Courthouse, Thomas Harrison House, and Joshua Wilton House.
