= 1947 Harrisonburg explosion =

Mass casualty event in Harrisonburg

- Date: July 29, 1947
- Time: 2:10 p.m. (Eastern Time Zone)
- Location: Masters Building, Harrisonburg, Virginia, United States; 38°26′49.5″N 78°52′7.9″W
- Type: Gas explosion
- Cause: Gas leak
- Deaths: 11
- Injuries: 60, including 30 severe

On July 29, 1947, a gas explosion at the Masters Building in downtown Harrisonburg, Virginia, killing 11 people and injuring 30. Most of those injured or killed were in Pauline's Beauty Shoppe, a beauty boutique. A lawsuit stemming from the event, Masters v. Hart (1949), would set precedent for joinder cases across the United States.

== Explosion ==
The Masters Building, owned by Evelyn Masters, hosted several businesses including the Rhodes Jewelry Store, an Advance auto-parts store and Pauline's Beauty Shoppe, a beauty salon and school ran by Pauline Sullivan and Lucille Ritchie. Located on the corner of Franklin and South Main Street, Pauline's functioned as a community space for residents of the Shenandoah Valley. The building used a water heater that ran off of butane, which flowed through a pipe that had been corroding. Consumers’ Utilities Company had installed the pipes and sold the gas supplied in the building. Employees of W.M. Menefee and Sons had been loading coal into the basement of the building. Around 2:10PM, one of them struck a match to light their cigarette, igniting the leaking gas.

Witnesses reported an enormous blast felt as far away as four miles. Two women were thrown through the roof. Twenty-one women had been in the beauty shoppe when the explosion happened and all were either killed or injured. Both Pauline's Beauty Shoppe and Rhodes Jewelry were completely destroyed in addition to a vacant storefront. The Advance Autoparts only suffered slight damage as it was on the opposite end of the building. Windows of a nearby church as well as neighborhood houses were blown out, injuring a workman in a different building.

A large plume of smoke rose over the city. Following the explosion, a fire broke out in the debris, but it was quickly put out.

The local hospital, which only had two rooms in the emergency department, was quickly overwhelmed, resulting in the cafeteria being used as a temporary triage zone.

According to the Associated Press, a crowd of 2,000 people swarmed the area immediately after, seeing if any of their relatives or friends were caught in the explosion.

The cost of the damage was estimated at $60,000, roughly $870,000 in 2026.

== Victims ==
According to the official number 11 people died and 30 people were injured.

Initial reports stated there were 10 people killed and 19 injured. with other reports stating 12 people who were killed and 60 others who were injured, of whom mostly women, including 25 who were hospitalized.

Those who died were:

- Annie Payne Baker, 43, of Staunton, student
- Dorothy Zeraba Batzold, 20, of Waynesboro, student
- Dorothy Gail Bowman, 20, of Mount Jackson, patron
- Harriet Ann Garber, 52, of Harrisonburg, patron
- Wilda Pauline Gulley, 18, of Swoope, student
- Ruth Eleanor Hart, 32, of Berryville, student
- Elizabeth Alicia Seigle, 55, of Harrisonburg, student
- Pauline Marie Sheffer, 24, of Lone Fountain, student
- Rebecca Crabill Sherman, 26, of Harrisonburg, student
- Charlotte McAllister Shreckhise, 32, of Weyers Cave, teacher
- Bonnie Catherine Sites, 16 of Keezletown, student

== Aftermath ==
After the explosion, Senator Harry F. Byrd asked the Bureau of Mines to investigate the source of the explosion. In less than a week, the Bureau had completed the investigation and confirmed it was a butane leak. The engineers recommended the pipes be inspected more often and that more malodorant be added to the gas.

A resulting lawsuit, Masters v. Hart (1949), set precedent on joinders. T.E. Hart, administrator of Ruth Hart's estate, sued Masters, Consumers’ Utilities Company, and W.M. Menefee for negligence leading to the decedent's death. Initially Masters tried to join the city of Harrisonburg as well as Sullivan and Ritchie, claiming they shared fault with her. The court allowed this at first, but later retracted it when the city and business partners asked to be removed. Masters appealed this decision, but the Virginia Supreme Court affirmed that defendants had no absolute rights in impleading other third-party defendants and that the judge could decide whether or not to allow joinders.

The site is now occupied by a bank building. On October 17, 2020, another gas explosion occurred in the city on Miller Circle, injuring five people including three James Madison University students.

== See also ==
- 1946 Greenville propane explosion
