= Turner Ashby Monument =

- U.S. National Register of Historic Places
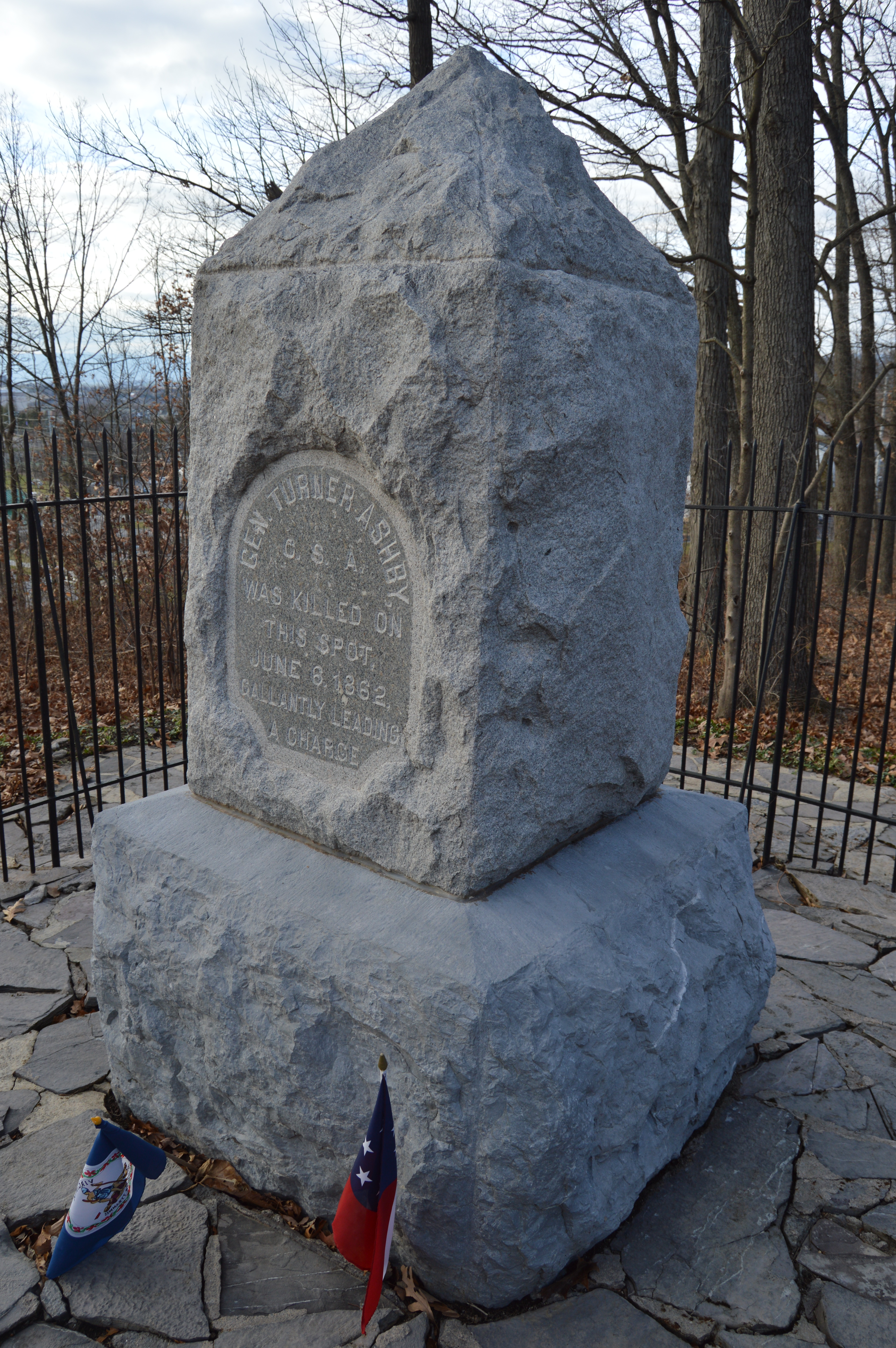

- Location within Virginia Location within the United States
- Location: 1164 Turner Ashby Ln., Harrisonburg, Virginia
- Coordinates: 38°25′23″N 78°51′53″W
- Area: 1.7 acres (0.69 ha)
- Built: 1898
- NRHP reference No.: 100001080
- Added to NRHP: June 12, 2017

The Turner Ashby Monument is a memorial placed in 1898 to mark the place at which Confederate Army Colonel Turner Ashby was killed in the 1862 Battle of Good's Farm. It is located at the end of Turner Ashby Lane in a small privately maintained park that is open to the public. It consists of a granite shaft, its sides finished roughly except for the inscription panel, with a similarly cut pyramidal top. It is set on a limestone base. Its 1898 dedication ceremony was attended by 5,000 people, and typifies emblems of the Lost Cause of the Confederacy.

The monument was listed on the National Register of Historic Places in 2017.

== See also ==
- National Register of Historic Places listings in Harrisonburg, Virginia
