= Morrison House =

Morrison House may refer to:

== United States ==
(by state, then city/town)

- James Arthur Morrison House, Mobile, Alabama, listed on the National Register of Historic Places (NRHP)
- Morrison House (Prescott, Arizona), listed on the NRHP in Prescott, Arizona
- Jackson Morrison House, Hartwell, Georgia, listed on the NRHP in Hart County, Georgia
- Francis H. Morrison House, LaPorte, Indiana, NRHP-listed
- Morrison House (Kirksville, Kentucky), listed on the NRHP in Madison County, Kentucky
- Alfred W. Morrison House, Fayette, Missouri, NRHP-listed
- Roderick M. Morrison House, Penn Yan, New York, NRHP-listed
- Morrison House (Cincinnati, Ohio), NRHP-listed
- Edward Morrison House, Pukwana, South Dakota, NRHP-listed
- William J. Morrison Jr. House, San Antonio, Texas, listed on the NRHP in Bexar County, Texas
- Morrison House (Harrisonburg, Virginia), NRHP-listed
