= George Earman House =

Historic house in Virginia, United States

- U.S. National Register of Historic Places
- Virginia Landmarks Register
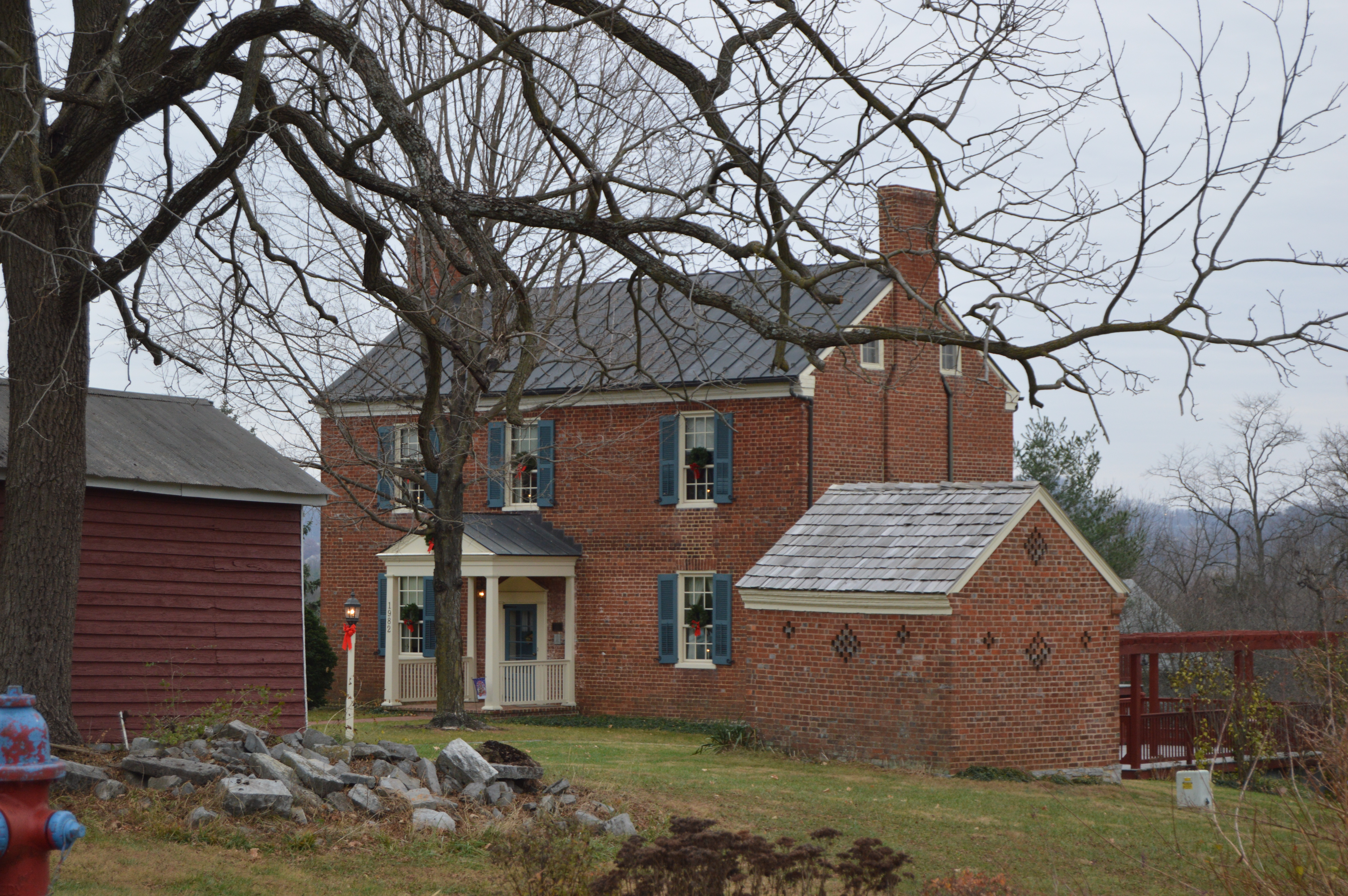
- Front and southwestern side

- Location within Virginia Location within the United States
- Location: 109 Pleasant Hill Rd., Harrisonburg, Virginia
- Coordinates: 38°25′38″N 78°53′54″W
- Area: 3 acres (1.2 ha)
- Built: 1822
- Architectural style: Federal, I-house
- NRHP reference No.: 82004594
- VLR No.: 082-0137

Significant dates
- Added to NRHP: July 15, 1982
- Designated VLR: September 15, 1981

George Earman House, also known as the Earman-Logan House, is a historic home located in Harrisonburg, Virginia, United States. It was built about 1822, and was originally a two-story, five-bay, brick I-house dwelling. The main entrance was reversed to the rear three bay side by the late-19th century, and a one-story ell had been added off the former front facade. The interior features a showy Federal interior with original painting in the first floor south parlor.

It was listed on the National Register of Historic Places in 1982.
