= Ida Mae Francis Tourist Home =

- U.S. National Register of Historic Places
- Virginia Landmarks Register
- Location within Virginia Location within the United States
- Location: 252 North Mason Street, Harrisonburg, Virginia
- Coordinates: 38°27′07″N 78°51′56″W
- NRHP reference No.: 100010805
- VLR No.: 115-0430

Significant dates
- Added to NRHP: September 9, 2024
- Designated VLR: June 20, 2024

The Ida Mae Francis Tourist Home is a historic house in Harrisonburg, Virginia. Built around 1908, it was operated by Ida Mae Francis as a boarding and tourist home for African-American travelers. It was listed in several editions of The Negro Motorist Green Book in the 1950s and early 1960s.

== History ==
The house was built around 1908 for Ida Mae Francis and her husband, Henry William Francis, who was a shoemaker. After Henry Francis died in 1912, Ida Mae Francis began taking in boarders and short-term guests as a source of income.

During the Jim Crow era, the home became known as a safe lodging place for Black travelers visiting or passing through Harrisonburg. It was one of several in Harrisonburg to appear in Green Book guides published for 1954, 1955, 1956, 1957, and 1962. The 1954 through 1956 listings mistakenly gave the address as 252 North Main Street before later editions corrected it.

Inventor and scientist George Washington Carver stayed at the house in 1928 while in the Harrisonburg area for speaking engagements at Madison College and Bridgewater College. Members of the bands of Duke Ellington and Count Basie were among the house's guests, as were entertainers with a Black-owned circus called Silas Green from New Orleans.

The home was an important center of African-American social life in Harrisonburg during segregation. The house stopped operating as a tourist home in 1962, but Francis and her family continued to live there.

In 2022, the house passed to William Reed, whose daughter, Harrisonburg mayor Deanna Reed, became involved in preservation efforts. In 2026 the property's nonprofit organization received 501(c)(3) status and raised funds for acquisition and preservation.

== Description ==
The Ida Mae Francis Tourist Home is a two-story, five-bedroom frame I-house with Craftsman detailing. The house has a side-gable roof, a one-story front porch, and a two-story rear ell. Interior features include an elaborate mantel with lionhead carvings, a colonnaded screen, French doors, and decorative faux-wood painting.

The house stands at the corner of North Mason and East Rock streets in Harrisonburg's historically African-American Newtown neighborhood, now generally known as the Northeast Neighborhood. It is at the corner of two mid-20th-century urban renewal project areas (R-4 and R-16) that displaced 166 families as well as several Black-owned businesses.

== Distinctions ==
The Francis House is one of few remaining early houses from the Northeast neighborhood. It was added to the Virginia Landmarks Register on June 20, 2024, and to the National Register of Historic Places on September 9, 2024. The house was the first in Virginia to be listed on the state landmarks register for its significance as a Green Book site.

== See also ==
- National Register of Historic Places listings in Harrisonburg, Virginia
- The Negro Motorist Green Book
- Virginia Landmarks Register
