= Newtown Cemetery =

Historic African American cemetery in Harrisonburg, Virginia, US

- U.S. National Register of Historic Places
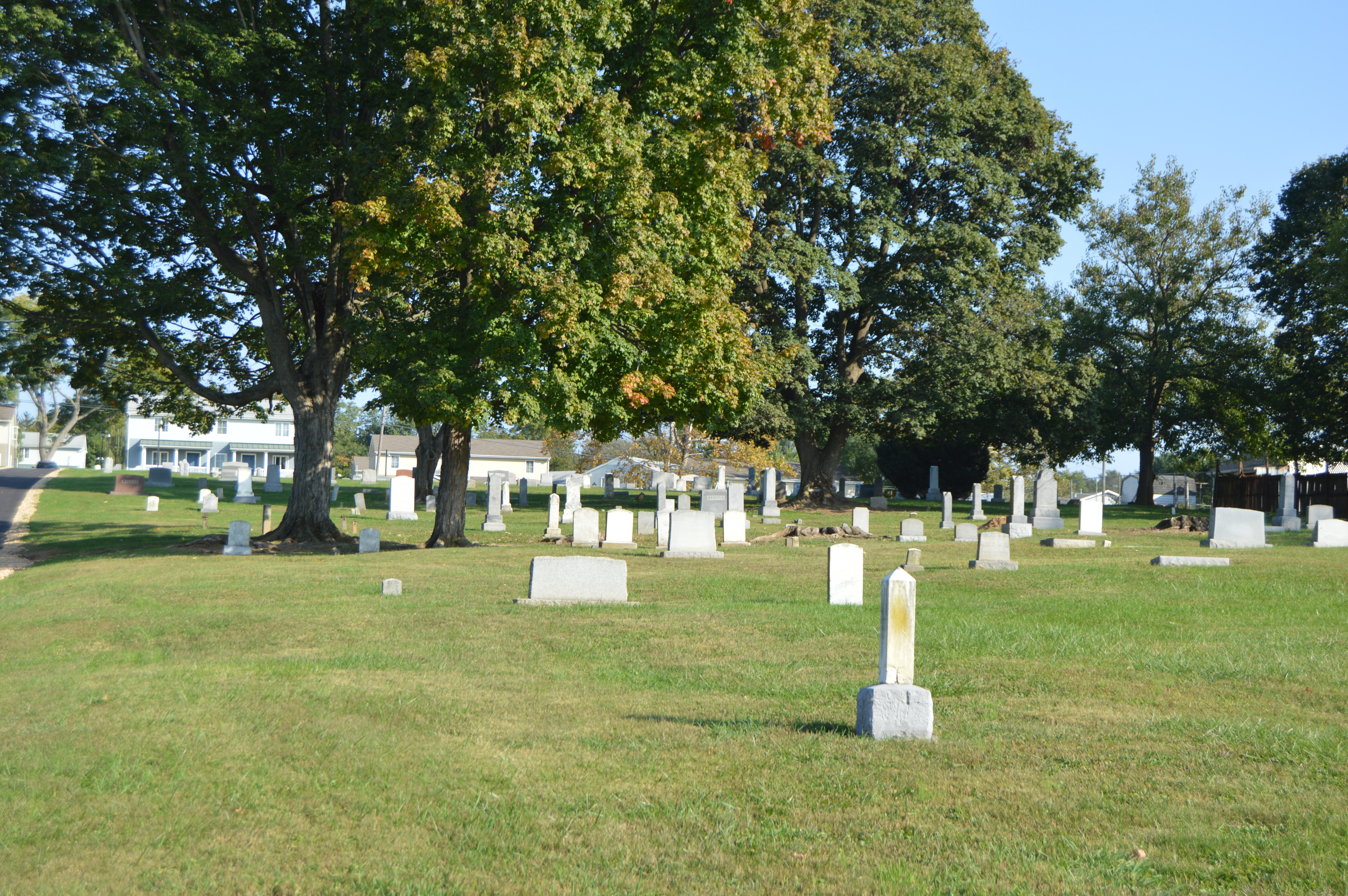
- Western section of the cemetery

- Location within Virginia Location within the United States
- Location: Roughly bounded by Kelley, Hill, Sterling, and Gay Sts., Harrisonburg, Virginia
- Coordinates: 38°27′12″N 78°51′31″W
- Area: 3.9 acres (1.6 ha)
- Built: 1869
- NRHP reference No.: 15000014
- Added to NRHP: February 17, 2015

Newtown Cemetery is a historic cemetery in Harrisonburg, Virginia. It is located in the northern part of the city, bounded on the north by Kelley Street and the west by Sterling Street. It is bisected by an extension of Effinger Street, which now serves as part of the cemetery's circulation roads. The roughly 4-acre (1.6 ha) parcel has been the primary burial ground for the city's African-American dead since its founding in 1869. It is estimated to hold 900 graves, including many of emancipated slaves. Buried at Newtown are individuals who influenced the lives of people in the Newtown community, the city of Harrisonburg, and Rockingham County and the central Shenandoah Valley as well. Notable burials include educator Lucy F. Simms and veterans of the US Colored Troops.

The cemetery was listed on the National Register of Historic Places in 2015.

== See also ==
- National Register of Historic Places listings in Harrisonburg, Virginia
