= John Birdsell Oren =

United States Coast Guard admiral

John Birdsell Oren (December 27, 1909 – December 22, 2006) was a Rear Admiral in the United States Coast Guard.

== Biography ==
Oren was born on December 27, 1909, in Madison, Wisconsin. He obtained a M.S. in Marine Engineering from the Massachusetts Institute of Technology. Oren married Virginia Prentis, who died in 2002. They had two children, Joan Strickler and John Oren.

Oren died on December 22, 2006, in Harrisonburg, Virginia. He is buried at Arlington National Cemetery, Virginia.

== Career ==
Oren originally joined the United States Navy in 1928 and later entered the United States Naval Academy. A year after entering the Naval Academy, he transferred to the United States Coast Guard Academy, graduating in 1933. During World War II, he served in the North Atlantic and the Pacific theaters. Later in his career, he served as Chief of Engineering of the Coast Guard and as president of the Society of American Military Engineers in 1966. He retired in 1967.

Awards he received include the Legion of Merit.

== Legacy ==
The Society of American Military Engineers' Oren Medal, conferred since 1968, is named after Oren.
