= Harrisonburg Transit =

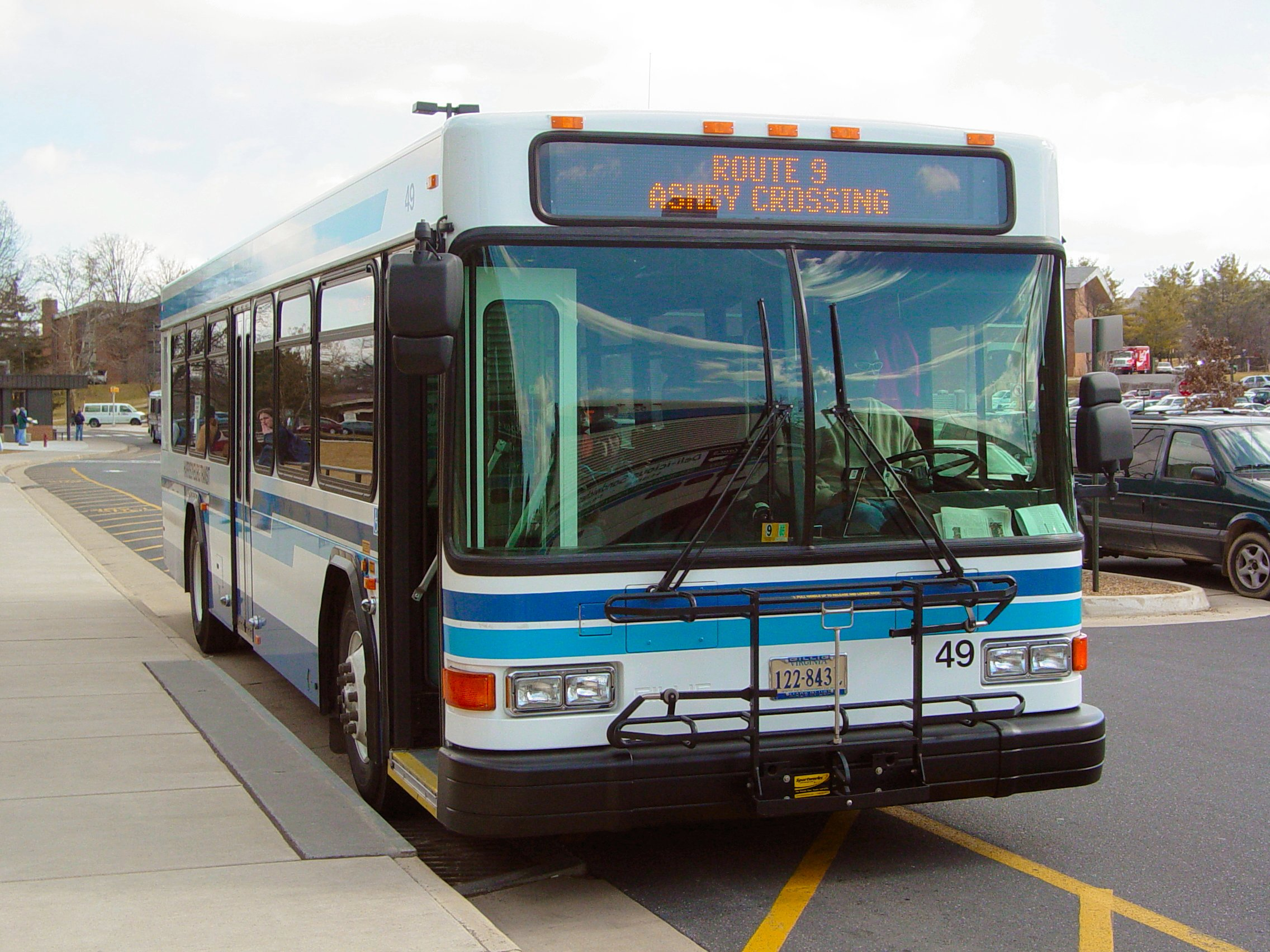
- Parent: Harrisonburg Department of Public Transportation
- Founded: 1976
- Headquarters: 475 E. Washington St
- Locale: Harrisonburg, VA
- Service type: bus service, paratransit, school bus, rideshare
- Website: harrisonburgva.gov/transit

Harrisonburg Transit is the municipally owned public transportation system for the City of Harrisonburg in the Shenandoah Valley region of Virginia. The system is operated by the Harrisonburg Department of Public Transportation (HDPT). Funding for the bus service is provided by the Virginia Department of Transportation, U.S. Department of Transportation, James Madison University, and the City of Harrisonburg.

== Services ==
Much of the scheduled bus service is focused around JMU at the Godwin Transit Center with the other transfer points for city routes being the transfer hub at East Gay Street and JMU's Festival Conference Center bus shelters. HDPT also provides regular daily school transportation, using a fleet of approximately 50 school buses, as well as for field trips and sporting events. Paratransit service is offered for persons who have disabilities as prescribed under the Americans with Disabilities Act.

Harrisonburg Transit's buses are mostly Gillig Low Floor buses with one Gillig Phantom bus. As of July 2016, the fleet consists of 39 fixed route transit buses with model years ranging from 2003 to 2015 (not including paratransit, school, or activity buses).

=== Year round bus routes ===
- Route 1 – East Market Street
- Route 2 – East Market Street & Northeast Neighborhoods
- Route 3 – South High & North Main
- Route 4 – South Main Street
- Route 5 – Virginia Ave
- Route 6 – Port Republic Road & Reservoir Street
- Route 7 - Harrisonburg Market & Switzer Lake Road

=== Routes operating only when JMU is in session ===
- Shopper – JMU to Walmart/Valley Mall (Weekday, Weeknight, Saturday, Sunday)
- Inner Campus Shuttle (ICS) – JMU Stops Only (Weekday)
- Inner Campus Shuttle Night (ICS Night) – JMU Stops Only (Weeknight)
- Inner Campus Shuttle Saturday (ICS Saturday) – JMU Stops Only (Saturday)
- Black Line – JMU to The Cottages/Deer Run/Foxhill/Northview/Southview/Squire Hill (Weekday)
- Blue Line – JMU to Avalon Woods/Campus View/Charleston Townes/Copper Beech/The Pointe/Redpoint (Weekday)
- Green Line – JMU to Deer Run/Foxhill/The Harrison/Hunters Ridge/Northview/Southview/Squire Hill (Weekday)
- Pink Line – JMU to The Harrison/Arcadia (Weekday)
- Purple Line – JMU to Sunchase (Weekday)
- Yellow Line – Campus Condo/Madison Gardens/Madison Square/The Mill/Pheasant Run (Weekday, Weeknight, Saturday)
- Gold Line – JMU to Sunchase/Charleston Townes/Copper Beech/Redpoint (Weeknight, Saturday)
- Silver Line – JMU to Hunters Ridge/Northview/The Cottages/Arcadia/Southview/The Harrison (Weeknight, Saturday)
