= Eastern Mennonite School =

- 38.4708°N 78.8751°W; Harrisonburg, Virginia, VA; USA

Information
- Type: Private School
- Motto: faith • academics • integrity • service
- Religious affiliation: Mennonite
- Established: 1917
- Head of School: Paul Leaman
- Enrollment: 342
- Student to teacher ratio: 12:1
- Colors: Royal Blue and Gold
- Athletics: 19 Interscholastic Sports
- Mascot: Flames
- Accreditation: VAIS, MEA, AdvancED
- Website: easternmennonite.org
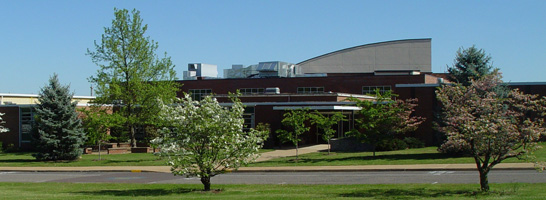
- EMS School Building

Eastern Mennonite School (EMS) is a K-12 private school in Harrisonburg, Virginia.

== Mission and philosophy ==
EMS's mission and its educational philosophy align with Anabaptist-Mennonite thought, teaching and valuing peace-building, with a Christ-centered approach. The school encourages demonstration of personal faith through service and through the practical application of knowledge, and it emphasizes living responsibly and pursuing peace in one's local and global community. Faculty seek to teach examples of peacemaking in history and in current affairs. Students experience the Christian mission of the school through Bible curricula in each grade, K-12; they attend daily chapels (6–12), have weekly elementary school gatherings, and have weekly Neighbor Group meetings (6–12). Twice a year, the staff invites a Spiritual Renewal Speaker to hold week-long chapel meetings with the students.

Regular student trips to distant cities, states, and countries take place through annual E-terms (week-long Experiential Term), domestic and international Touring Choir trips, and biennial Discovery trips that take students on educational learning experiences to the American west coast and back.

== History ==
Eastern Mennonite School began in 1917 as a high school and Bible school, adding college classes as the institution grew. In 1964, the school built a new building on Parkwood Drive directly below what was then Eastern Mennonite College (now Eastern Mennonite University). In 1968, EMS expanded schooling to grades 7-12 and was renamed Eastern Mennonite High School. In 1982, Eastern Mennonite High School officially become a separate legal entity from Eastern Mennonite College, with its own governing Board of Directors. In 2005 the school created Eastern Mennonite Elementary School. To shape its identity as a K-12 school, the organization was renamed Eastern Mennonite School, encompassing all three divisions - Elementary, Middle, and High schools. In 2006 the school expanded its facility to include a new 650-seat auditorium, fine and performing arts classrooms, expanded and renovated Science wing, and other additional classrooms. In the summer of 2009, the school renovated the gym, adding better lights and new bleachers, and a new hardwood floor.

== Co-curriculars ==
Athletics, performing arts, clubs, and other available co-curricular activities encourage student connection to the school community. The percentage of Eastern Mennonite School students that participate in co-curricular activities is generally between 94% and 96%.

=== Athletics ===
The elementary division of Eastern Mennonite School is part of the Blue Ridge Area Athletics Association. BRAAA is a group of area Christian elementary schools who have come together to provide team competition in sports. The elementary division has two seasons including fall soccer and winter basketball. All teams are co-ed, and are coached by parents and officiated by either parents or high school students. Practices are generally once a week with games scheduled on Saturdays. The seasons last approximately two months. Students are divided into teams according to their grades. Kindergarten, first, and second graders play on one team and third, fourth, and fifth graders play on another team.

The middle and high school divisions currently have a total of 26 teams: eight teams each fall and winter season and ten teams in the spring. All of the boys’ teams participate in the Virginia Independent Conference (VIC). The girls’ teams participate in the Blue Ridge Conference (BRC). Both conferences are for private schools in the state of Virginia. All varsity teams are eligible for post-season VISAA state competition. The Middle School level emphasis is on cultivating student interest, skill development, proper technique, and learning the rules of the particular sport more than winning. Team membership includes sixth, seventh, and eighth grades. The Junior Varsity team membership includes eighth, freshman, and sophomores (sixth and seventh when no middle school team is offered). At the Varsity level, emphasis is on fielding a team with the best opportunity to win while maintaining high levels of sportsmanship. This may result in unequal playing time. Although winning is important, other factors like developing team unity, significant individual progress and team improvement are vital keys to a successful season. Team Membership includes eighth through twelfth grades.

=== Performing arts ===
Each year in the elementary division, all fourth and fifth grade students perform a full-length drama for their parents and peers. Special Days are planned by "committees" of students with representation from each grade, and include themes such as Pajama Reading Day, Storybook Character Day, Crazy Hair Day, and Sports Day.

Each year the middle and high school divisions provide an opportunity for students in each grade level to participate in a drama production. Regularly scheduled stage productions include a middle school play, a high school musical, and a senior play. These stage productions also provide an opportunity for students to participate off-stage as sound and lighting technicians, stage managers, and assistant directors. In addition to dramatic stage productions, other opportunities in performing arts include participation in a full orchestra, jazz band, large choirs, and small vocal and string ensembles.

=== Clubs ===
Students sign up for clubs that interest them and many choose to participate in multiple clubs. All clubs have a faculty or parent sponsor to provide leadership and supervision. Each year, an effort is made to offer clubs that meet the interests of all age groups; however, students may also request a specific club be created and sponsored if sufficient interest is expressed by a group of students. Examples of clubs available at the elementary division include Chess Club and FIRST LEGO League. Middle and high school division clubs include the Windsock, Envirothon, FTC, Model UN, Poetry Debate, D&D, Art, and WeServe.
