= Morrison House (Harrisonburg, Virginia) =

Historic house in Virginia, United States

- Formerly listed on the U.S. National Register of Historic Places
- Virginia Landmarks Register
- Location within Virginia Location within the United States
- Location: W. Market and N. Liberty Sts., Harrisonburg, Virginia
- Coordinates: 38.449884°N 78.870725°W
- Area: 9.9 acres (4.0 ha)
- Built: c. 1820-1824
- Architectural style: Federal
- NRHP reference No.: 71001054
- VLR No.: 115-0006

Significant dates
- Added to NRHP: 1971
- Designated VLR
- Removed from NRHP: September 28, 1982

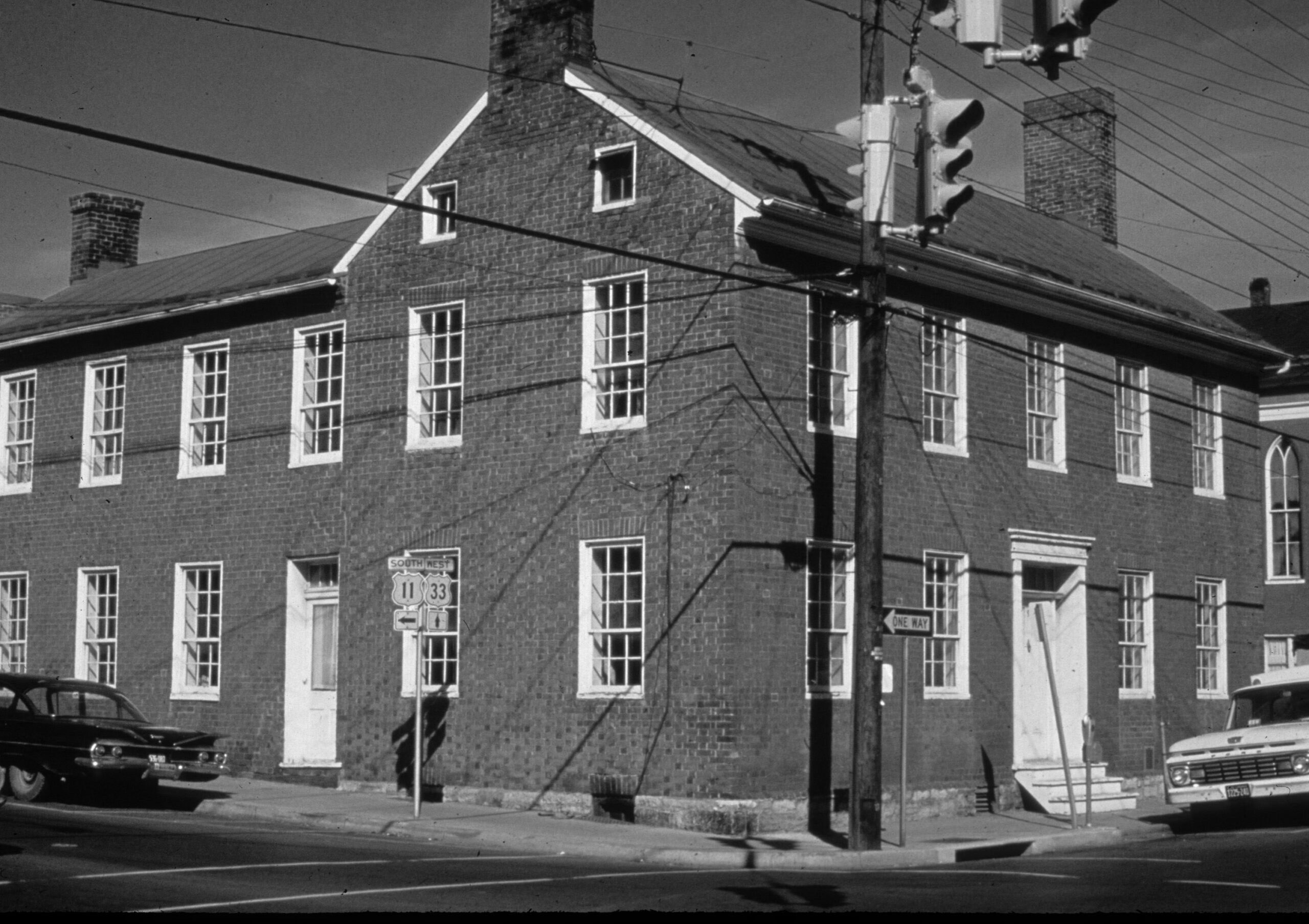
Morrison House, Harrisonburg, Virginia, 1970

Morrison House was a historic home located at Harrisonburg, Virginia. It was built between 1820 and 1824 for Joseph Thornton, and was a two-story, brick Federal style town house with a two-story, brick rear ell. It had a metal sheathed side-gable roof and interior end chimneys.

It was listed on the National Register of Historic Places in 1971. The Morrison House was one of the few early homes remaining in downtown Harrisonburg, and stood in an excellent state of preservation until 1982. In February 1982, the Wetsel Seed Company demolished the house for use as a parking lot.
