= Anthony Hockman House =

Historic house in Virginia, United States

- U.S. National Register of Historic Places
- Virginia Landmarks Register
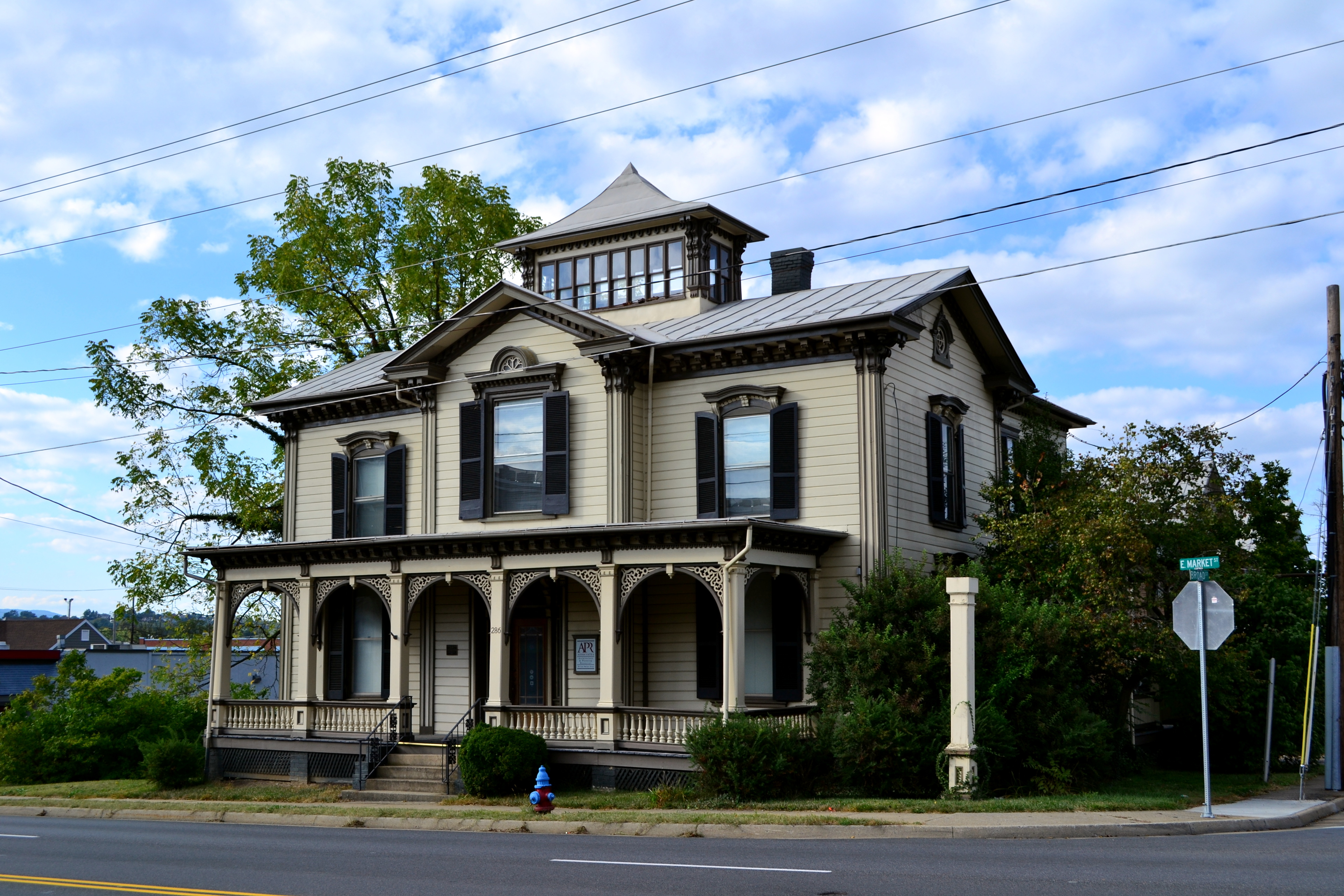
- Anthony Hockman House, September 2013

- Location within Virginia Location within the United States
- Location: E. Market and Broad Sts., Harrisonburg, Virginia
- Coordinates: 38°26′56″N 78°51′55″W
- Area: less than one acre
- Built: 1871
- Built by: Hockman & Bucher
- Architectural style: Italianate
- NRHP reference No.: 82004565
- VLR No.: 115-0023

Significant dates
- Added to NRHP: July 8, 1982
- Designated VLR: January 20, 1981

Anthony Hockman House, also known as Hockman-Roller House, is an historic home located in Harrisonburg, Virginia. It was built in 1871, and is a two-story, three-bay, frame I-house Italianate dwelling. It has a projecting central bay topped with a low gable and with the hipped-roof cupola. The house features applied "gingerbread" trim, including molded corner pilasters, a heavily bracketed cornice, an elaborate one-story front porch, and heavily molded regency garret windows.

It was listed on the National Register of Historic Places in 1982.
