= Whitesel Brothers =

Historic commercial building in Virginia, United States

- U.S. National Register of Historic Places
- Virginia Landmarks Register
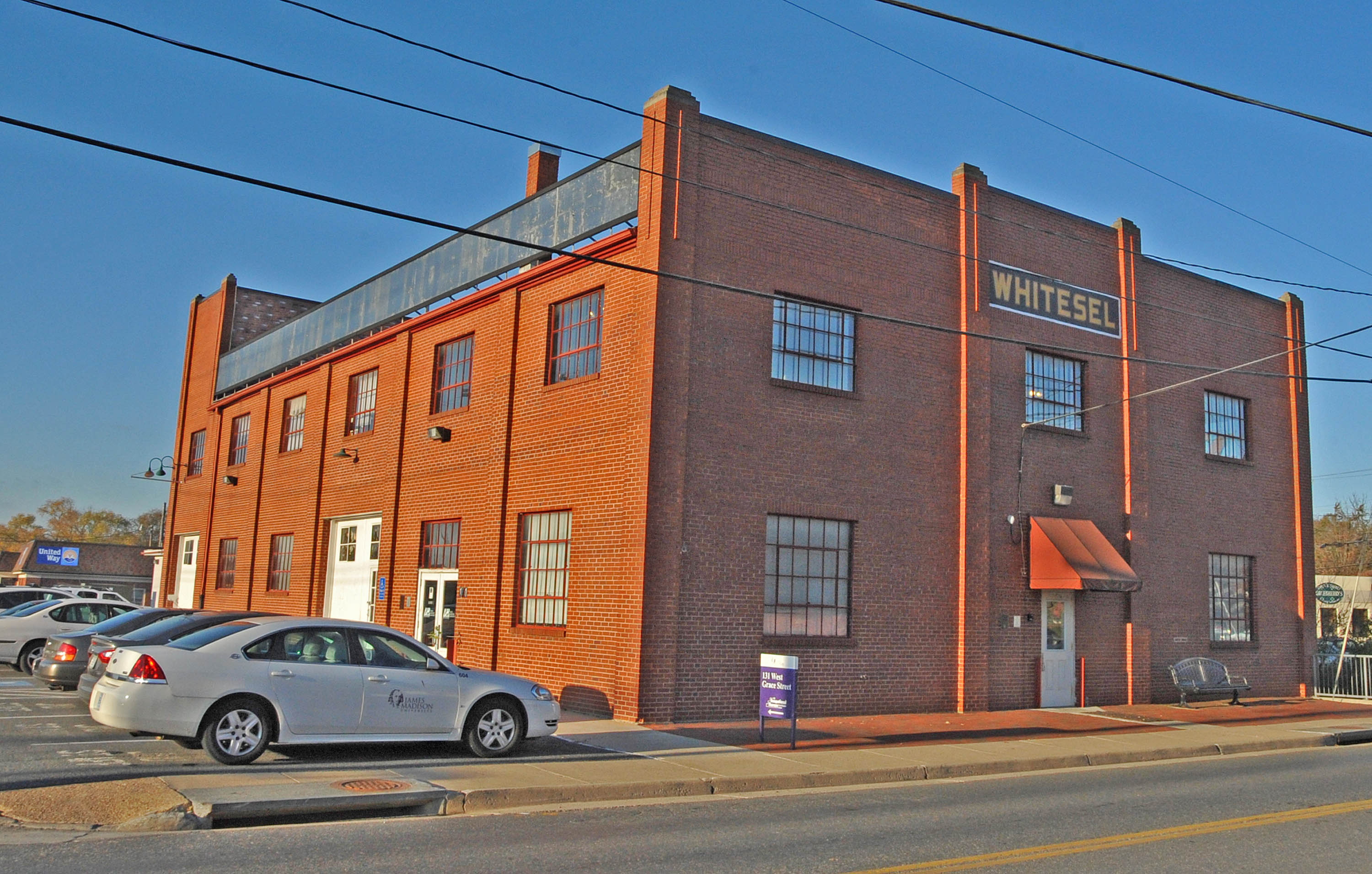

- Location within Virginia Location within the United States
- Location: 131 W. Grace St., Harrisonburg, Virginia
- Coordinates: 38°26′42″N 78°52′40″W
- Area: less than one acre
- Built: 1939
- Architectural style: Early Commercial
- NRHP reference No.: 05000472
- VLR No.: 115-5048

Significant dates
- Added to NRHP: May 18, 2005
- Designated VLR: March 16, 2005

Whitesel Brothers is a historic warehouse located at Harrisonburg, Virginia. The original section was built in 1939, with later additions built between 1939 and 1948 and after 1961. The original section is a two-story brick building, with a somewhat taller elevator tower. It has a second-floor arched truss system and intact original mechanical systems.

It was listed on the National Register of Historic Places in 2005.
