= Lone Fountain, Virginia =

Unincorporated community in Virginia, United States

Coordinates: 38°14′48″N 79°11′0″W

Lone Fountain is an unincorporated community located in Augusta County, Virginia, United States. It has a very small population. Its area is 1 square mile (2.6 km^{2}).
