= Old Town Historic District (Harrisonburg, Virginia) =

Historic district in Virginia, United States

- U.S. National Register of Historic Places
- U.S. Historic district
- Virginia Landmarks Register
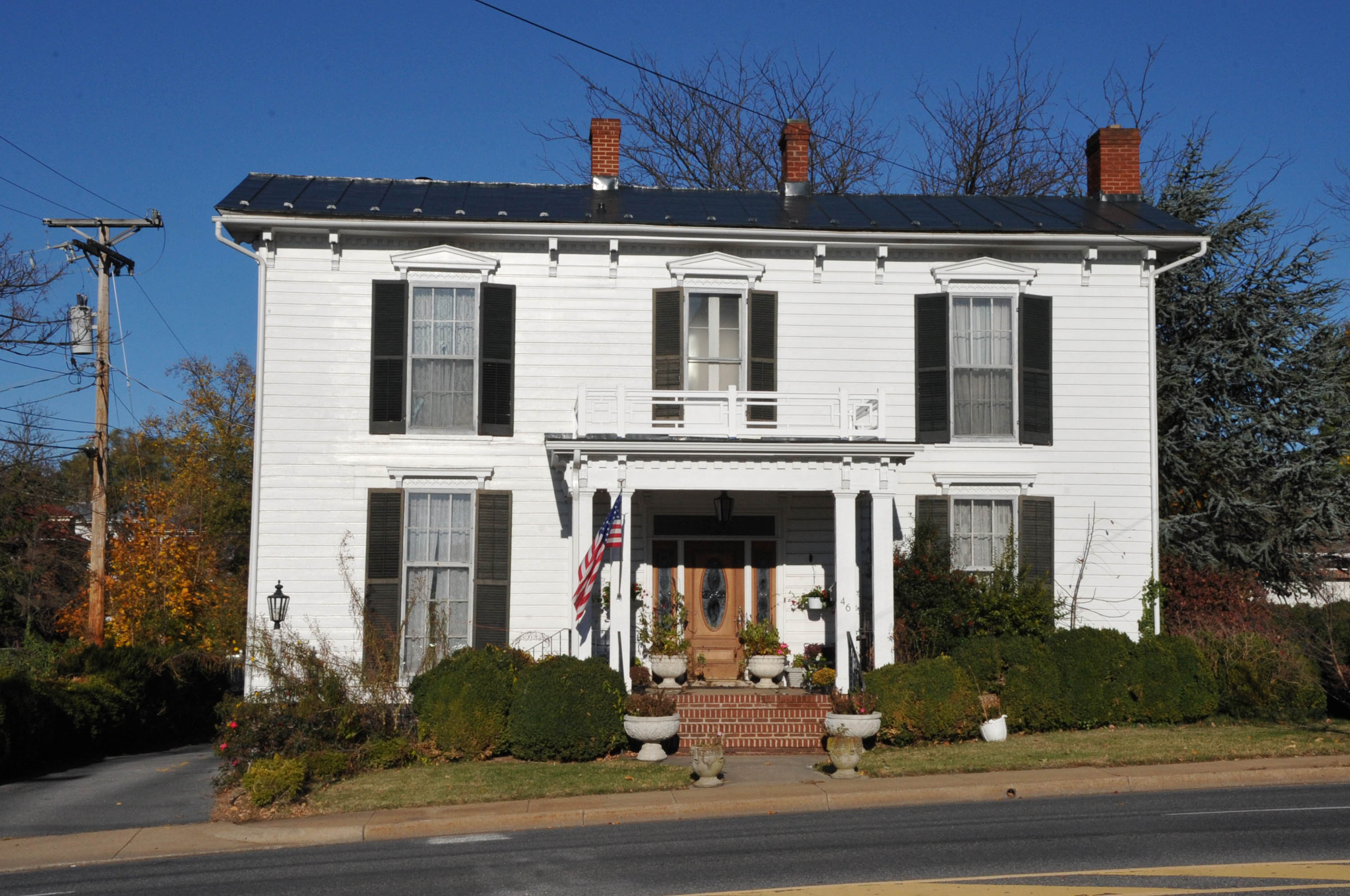

- Location within Virginia Location within the United States
- Location: Roughly bounded by Cantrell Ave., Ott, Water & S. Main Sts., Harrisonburg, Virginia
- Coordinates: 38°26′44.3″N 78°51′58.8″W
- Area: 98.5 acres (39.9 ha)
- Built: 1850
- Architect: Collins, Samuel; et al.
- Architectural style: Late Victorian, Late 19th And 20th Century Revivals
- NRHP reference No.: 08000026
- VLR No.: 115-5001

Significant dates
- Added to NRHP: February 14, 2008
- Designated VLR: September 5, 2007

The Old Town Historic District is an area located near downtown Harrisonburg, Virginia, that has been added to the National Register of Historic Places. It was added in March 2008. The area covers from northeast of James Madison University up to the area of Woodbine Cemetery.

Plans for the area include upscale and ethnic restaurants in restored historic structures, shops, antiques and boutiques, museums, art galleries, and a cultural arts district.
