= Joshua Wilton House =

Historic house in Virginia, United States

- U.S. National Register of Historic Places
- Virginia Landmarks Register
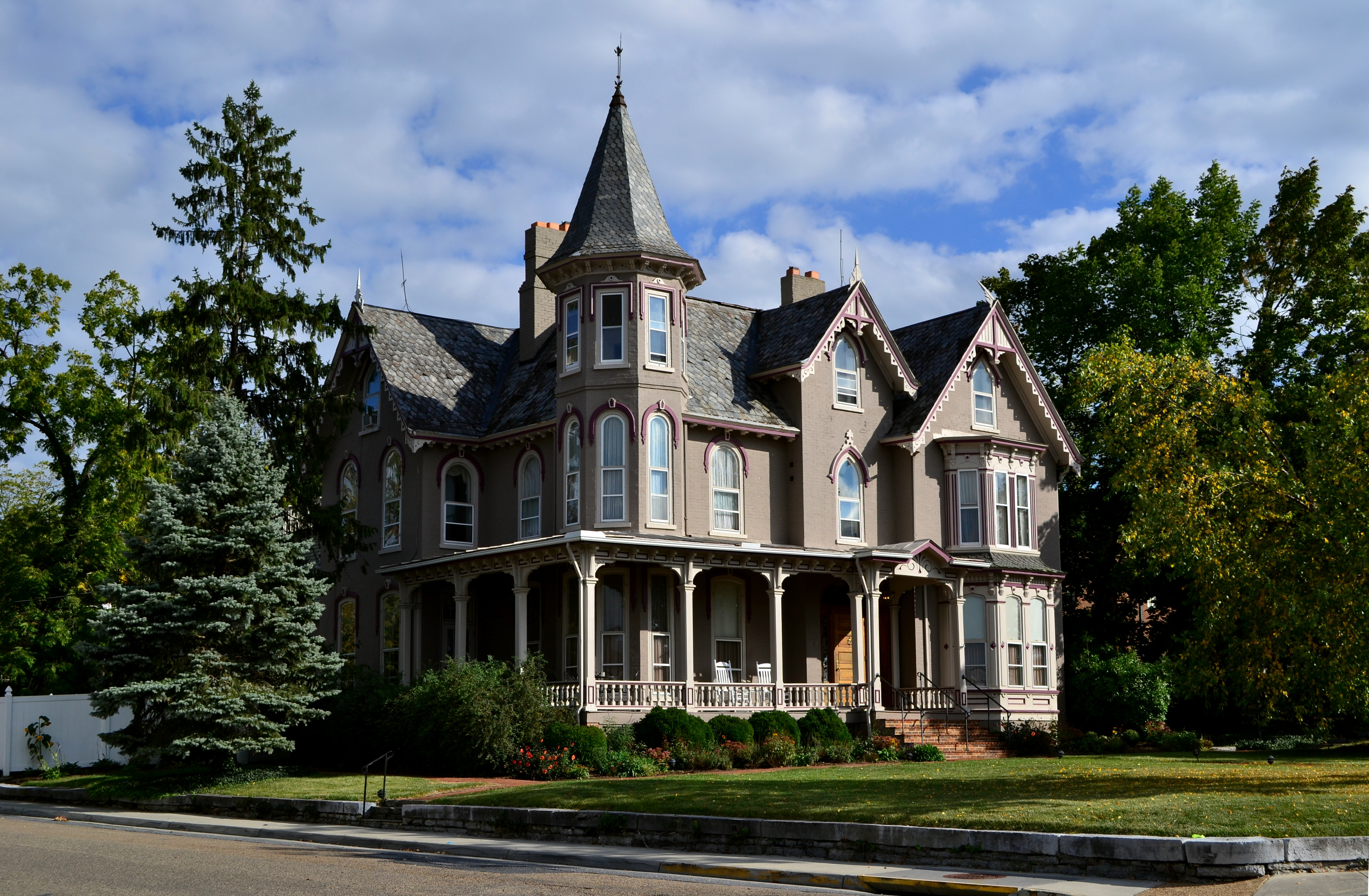
- Joshua Wilton House, September 2013

- Location within Virginia Location within the United States
- Location: 412 S. Main St., Harrisonburg, Virginia
- Coordinates: 38°26′42″N 78°52′11″W
- Area: less than one acre
- Built: 1890; 136 years ago
- Architectural style: Late Victorian
- NRHP reference No.: 79003281
- VLR No.: 115-0020

Significant dates
- Added to NRHP: May 24, 1979
- Designated VLR: October 17, 1978

Joshua Wilton House, also known as the Shank House and Tau Kappa Epsilon House, is a historic home located at Harrisonburg, Virginia.

== Description ==
It was built in 1888, and is a 2 1/2-story, central plan, brick eclectic Late Victorian dwelling. It has two projecting gabled pavilions and a three-story octagonal turret covered by a pointed roof. The house features elaborate wooden trim and brackets, and a fancy bargeboard decorates the eaves course of the gable roof.

It was listed on the National Register of Historic Places in 1979.
