= Rockingham County Courthouse (Virginia) =

- U.S. National Register of Historic Places
- Virginia Landmarks Register
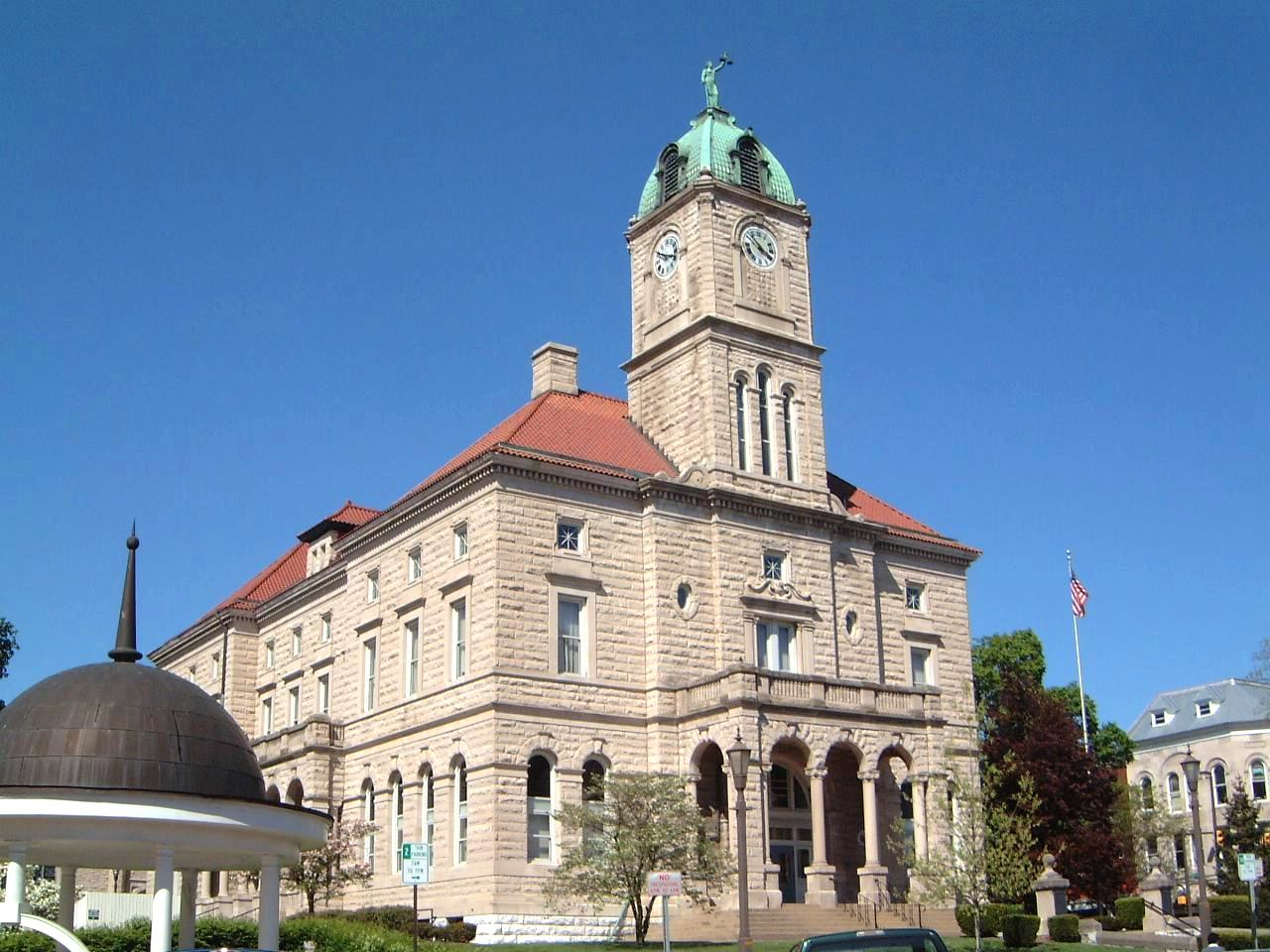
- Rockingham County Courthouse, April 2006

- Location within Virginia Location within the United States
- Interactive map showing the location of Rockingham County Courthouse
- Location: Courthouse Square, Harrisonburg, Virginia
- Coordinates: 38°26′58″N 78°52′10″W
- Area: 1 acre (0.40 ha)
- Built: 1896-1897
- Built by: Spiers, W.E.
- Architect: Collins, T.J.
- Architectural style: Renaissance, Romanesque, Richardsonian Romanesque
- NRHP reference No.: 82004566
- VLR No.: 115-0002

Significant dates
- Added to NRHP: September 16, 1982
- Designated VLR: July 20, 1982

Rockingham County Courthouse is a historic county courthouse located at Harrisonburg, Virginia. It was designed by T.J. Collins (1844–1925) and built in 1896–1897. The courthouse is a 3 1/2-story building of coursed rusticated ashlar above a raised basement. It has a tile covered hipped roof with a molded cornice with dentilwork above a plain frieze. The building has elements of the Richardsonian Romanesque and Romanesque Revival styles. It has a projecting central pavilion with a two-stage clock tower. Fronting the pavilion is a triple arched portico on the first story formed by slender columns set on square pedestals with a heavy stone balustrade above. It is the fifth courthouse to stand on the site since Rockingham was formed from Augusta County, Virginia in 1778.

It was listed on the National Register of Historic Places in 1982.
