= Thomas Harrison House (Harrisonburg, Virginia) =

Historic house in Virginia, United States

- U.S. National Register of Historic Places
- Virginia Landmarks Register
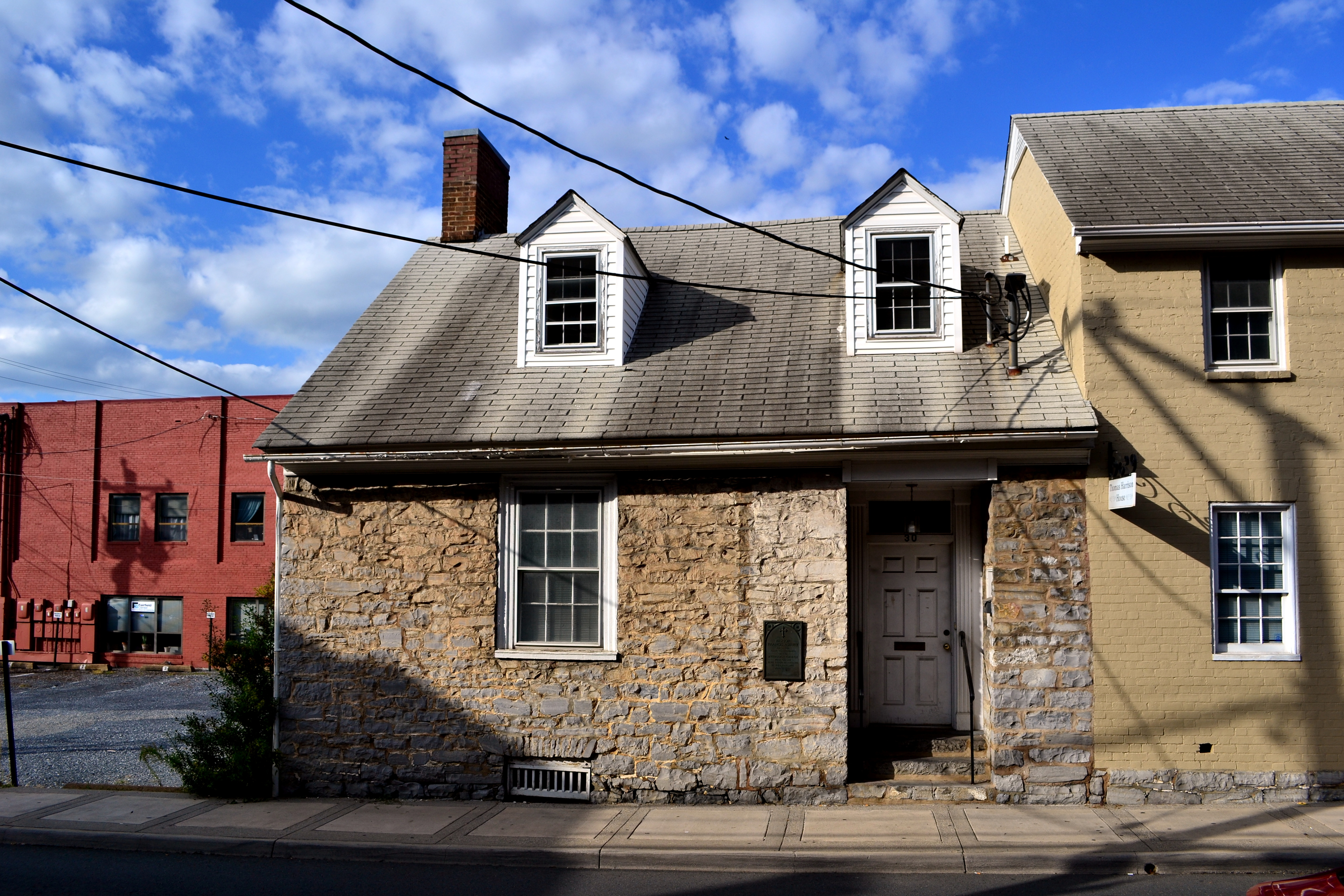
- Thomas Harrison House, September 2013

- Location within Virginia Location within the United States
- Location: 30 W. Bruce St., Harrisonburg, Virginia
- Coordinates: 38°26′51″N 78°52′11″W
- Built: 1750
- NRHP reference No.: 73002213
- VLR No.: 115-0008

Significant dates
- Added to NRHP: July 26, 1973
- Designated VLR: June 19, 1973

Thomas Harrison House is a historic home located at Harrisonburg, Virginia. It was built between 1790 and 1800 and is a 1½-story, two bay by one bay, coursed limestone vernacular dwelling. It has a gable roof and was built over a spring, which is accessible in the basement. It is the oldest house in Harrisonburg and its namesake is regarded as the town's founder.

It was listed on the National Register of Historic Places in 1973. Until 2018, it was believed that the building was built around 1750 by Thomas Harrison, however recent studies determined it was built after 1790. In 2018, the City of Harrisonburg partnered with the Margaret Grattan Weaver Institute of Regional Culture at Bridgewater College to restore the building. Led by James Madison University professor Carole Nash, the research term determined the structure was actually built no earlier than 1790, after Thomas Harrison died; subsequently, the team concluded that Harrison neither built nor ever lived in the structure that shares his name.
