= Harrisonburg, Virginia =

Independent city in Virginia, United States

- Independent city
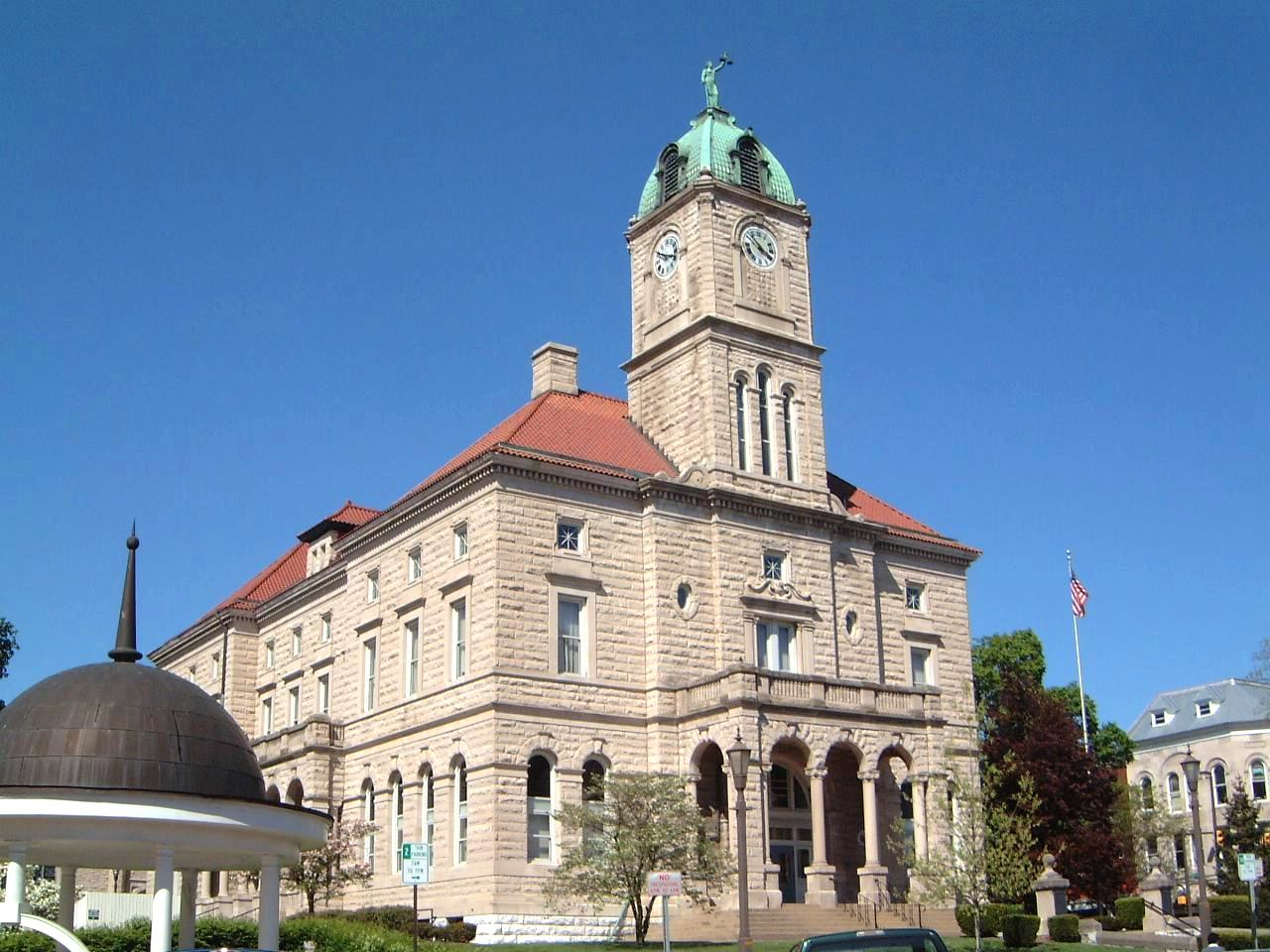
- Rockingham County Courthouse in Court Square in Downtown Harrisonburg

- Seal
- Nicknames: The Friendly City, Rocktown, H'burg, The Burg, Friendly by Nature
- Interactive map of Harrisonburg, Virginia
- Location within Virginia Location within the United States
- Coordinates: 38°26′58″N 78°52′08″W
- Country: United States
- State: Virginia
- County: Rockingham
- Founded: 1779
- Incorporated: 1916
- Founder: Thomas Harrison
- Named for: Thomas Harrison

Government
  - Type: Council-manager government
  - City Manager: Ande Banks
  - Mayor: Deanna R. Reed (D)
  - City Council: Council members: Deanna R. Reed (D); Dany Fleming (D); Laura Dent (D); Monica Robinson (D); Nasser Alsaadun (D)
  - House Delegate: Tony Wilt (R)
  - State Senator: Mark Obenshain (R)

Area
  - Total: 17.39 sq mi (45.04 km^{2})
  - Land: 17.34 sq mi (44.91 km^{2})
  - Water: 0.050 sq mi (0.13 km^{2})
- Elevation: 1,325 ft (404 m)

Population (2020)
  - Total: 51,814
  - Estimate (2025): 50,839 ▼
  - Density: 2,988/sq mi (1,154/km^{2})
- Time zone: UTC-5 (EST)
  - Summer (DST): UTC-4 (EDT)
- ZIP Codes: 22801–22803, 22807
- Area code: 540
- FIPS code: 51-35624
- GNIS feature ID: 1498489
- Website: www.harrisonburgva.gov

Harrisonburg is an independent city in the Shenandoah Valley region of the Commonwealth of Virginia, United States. It is also the county seat of the surrounding Rockingham County, although the two are separate jurisdictions. At the 2020 census, the population was 51,814. The Bureau of Economic Analysis combines the city of Harrisonburg with Rockingham County for statistical purposes into the Harrisonburg, Virginia Metropolitan Statistical Area, which had an estimated population of 126,562 in 2011.

Harrisonburg is home to James Madison University (JMU), a public research university with an enrollment of over 20,000 students, and Eastern Mennonite University (EMU), a private, Mennonite-affiliated liberal arts university, with an enrollment of approximately 2,000 students. Although the city has no historical association with President James Madison, JMU was nonetheless named in his honor as Madison College in 1938 and renamed as James Madison University in 1977. EMU largely owes its existence to the sizable Mennonite population in the Shenandoah Valley, to which many Pennsylvania Dutch settlers arrived beginning in the mid-18th century in search of rich, unsettled farmland.

The city has become a bastion of ethnic and linguistic diversity in recent years. Over 1,900 refugees have been settled in Harrisonburg since 2002. As of 2014, Hispanics or Latinos of any race make up 19% of the city's population. Harrisonburg City Public Schools (HCPS) students speak 55 languages in addition to English, with Spanish, Arabic, and Kurdish being the most common languages spoken. Over one-third of HCPS students are English as a second language (ESL) learners. Language learning software company Rosetta Stone was founded in Harrisonburg in 1992, and the multilingual "Welcome Your Neighbors" yard sign originated in Harrisonburg in 2016.

== History ==
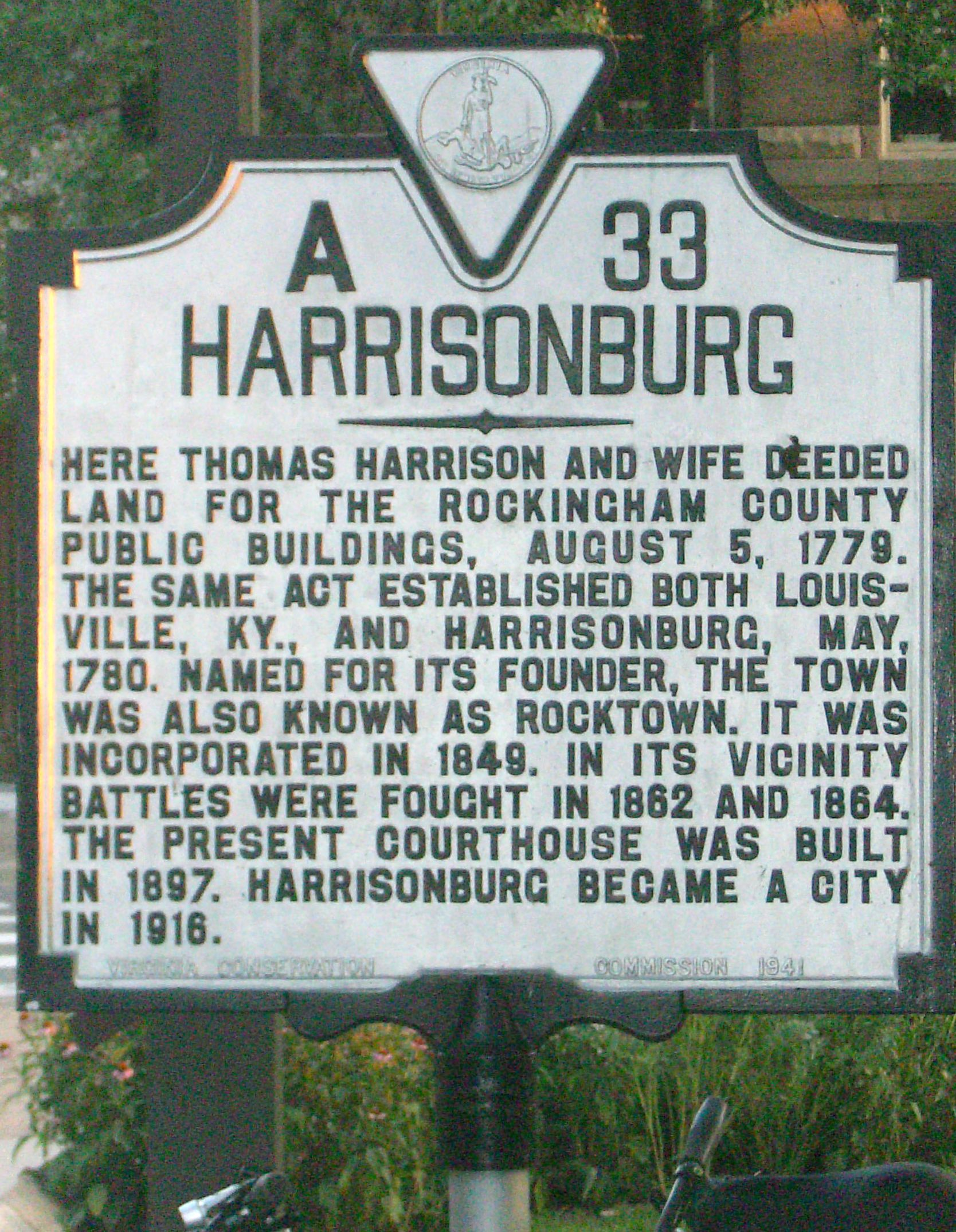
Harrisonburg was named for Thomas Harrison (1704–1785), an early settler.

The earliest documented English exploration of the area prior to settlement was the Knights of the Golden Horseshoe Expedition, led by Lt. Gov. Alexander Spotswood, who reached Elkton, and whose rangers continued and in 1716 likely passed through what is now Harrisonburg.

Harrisonburg, previously known as "Rocktown," was named for Thomas Harrison, a son of English settlers and member of the Harrison family of Virginia. In 1737, Harrison settled in the Shenandoah Valley, eventually laying claim to over 12,000 acres (4,900 ha) situated at the intersection of the Spotswood Trail and the main Native American road through the valley.

In 1779, Harrison deeded 2.5 acres (1.0 ha) of his land to the "public good" for the construction of a courthouse. In 1780, Harrison deeded an additional 50 acres (20 ha). This is the area now known as "Historic Downtown Harrisonburg".

In 1849, trustees chartered a mayor–council form of government, although Harrisonburg was not officially incorporated as an independent city until 1916. Today, a council–manager government administers Harrisonburg.

On June 6, 1862, an American Civil War skirmish took place at Good's Farm, Chestnut Ridge near Harrisonburg between the forces of the Union and the forces of the Confederacy at which the C.S. Army Colonel, Turner Ashby (1828–1862), was killed.

The city has expanded in size over the years.

In 1947, a gas leak led to an explosion at the Masters Building in downtown Harrisonburg, killing eleven people and injuring thirty people. In 2020, five people were injured when a building on Miller Circle exploded, coincidentally also from a gas leak.

=== Newtown ===
When enslaved peoples in the Shenandoah Valley were freed in 1865, they established a town called Newtown near modern-day Harrisonburg. This town was eventually annexed by the independent city of Harrisonburg some years later, probably around 1892. Today, the old city of Newtown is in the Northeast section of Harrisonburg in the area referred to as Downtown Harrisonburg. It remains the home of the majority of Harrisonburg's predominantly Black churches, such as First Baptist and Bethel AME. The modern Boys and Girls Club of Harrisonburg is located in the old Lucy Simms schoolhouse that was used for Black students in the days of segregation.

==== Project R-4 and R-16 ====
A large portion of this Black neighborhood was dismantled in the 1960s when – in the name of urban renewal – the city government used federal redevelopment funds from the Housing Act of 1949 to force Black families out of their homes and then bulldozed the neighborhood. This effort, called "Project R-4", focused on the city blocks east of Main, north of Gay, west of Broad, and south of Johnson. This area makes up 32.5 acres. "Project R-16" is a smaller tag on project which focused on the 7.5 acres south of Gay Street.

According to Bob Sullivan, an intern working in the city planner's office in 1958, the city planner at the time, David Clark, convinced the city council that Harrisonburg had slums. Newtown, a low socioeconomic status housing area, was declared a slum. Federal law mandated that the city needed to have a referendum on the issue before R-4 could begin. The vote was close with 1,024 votes in favor and 978 against R-4. In 1955, following the vote, the Harrisonburg Redevelopment and Housing Authority was established to carry out the project. All of the group's members were White men. Invoking the power of eminent domain, the government forced people in Newtown to sell their homes. Residents were offered payments for their homes far below their true real estate value. Many people could not afford a new home and had to move into public housing projects. Other families left Harrisonburg. It is estimated between 93 and 200 families were displaced.

In addition to families, many of the businesses of Newtown that were bought out could not afford to reestablish themselves. Locals say many prominent Black businesses like the Colonnade, which served as a pool hall, dance hall, community center, and tearoom, were unable to reopen. Kline's, a White-owned business, was one of the few businesses in the area that was able to reopen. The city later made $500,000 selling the seized property to redevelopers. Before the project, the area brought in $7000 in taxes annually. By 1976, the areas redeveloped in R-4 and R-16 were bringing in $45,000 in annual taxes. These profit gains led Lauren McKinney to regard the project as "one of only two 'profitable' redevelopment schemes in the state of Virginia".

Cultural landmarks were also influenced by the projects. Although later rebuilt, the Old First Baptist Church of Harrisonburg was demolished. Newtown Cemetery, a Historic African American Cemetery, was also impacted. Although it appears that no burials were destroyed, the western boundary was paved over and several headstones now touch the street.

=== Infrastructure ===
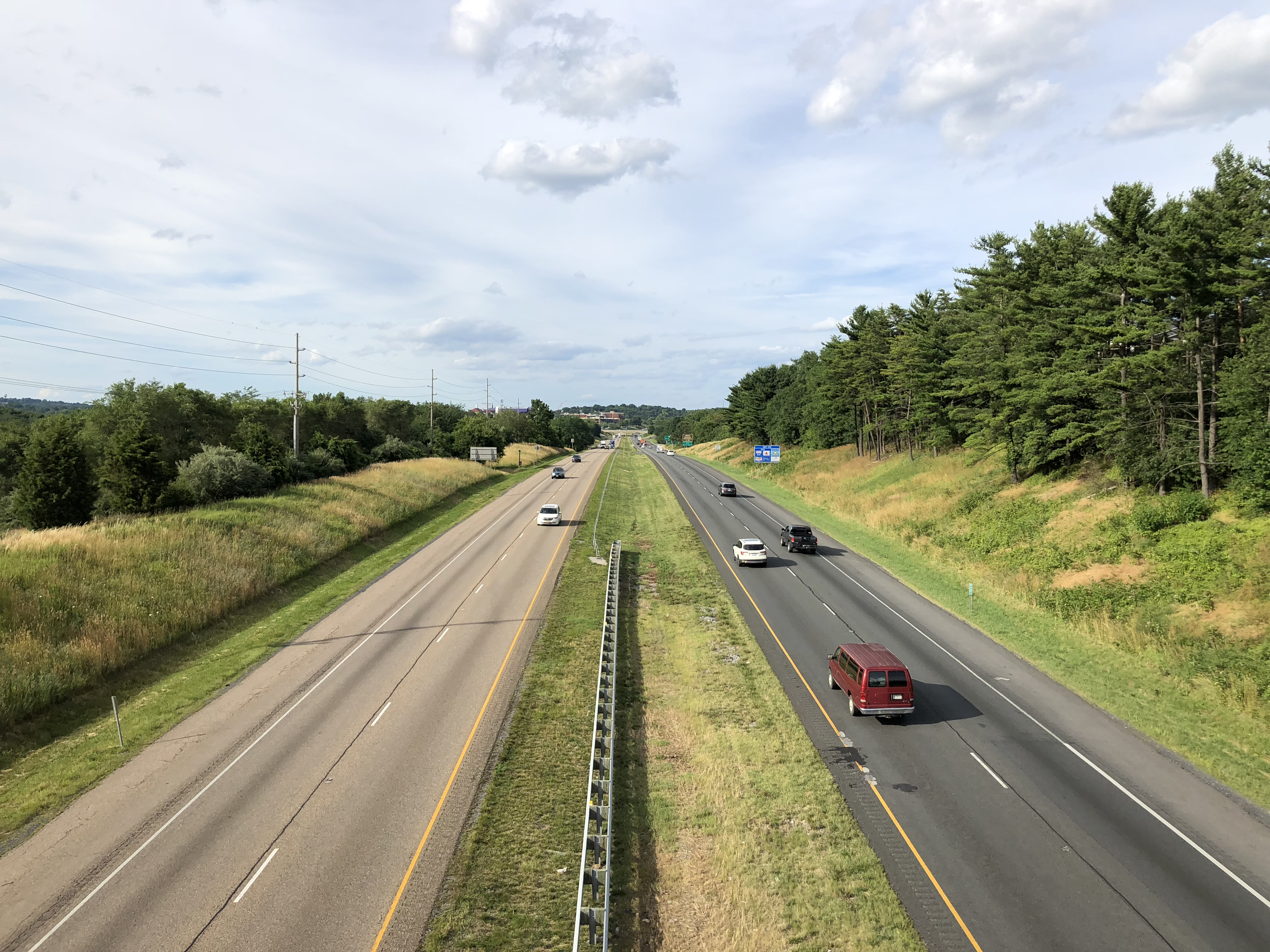
Interstate 81, a main roadway in Harrisonburg

Major highways in Harrisonburg include Interstate 81, the main north–south highway in western Virginia and the Shenandoah Valley. Other significant roads serving the city include U.S. Route 11, U.S. Route 33, Virginia State Route 42, Virginia State Route 253 and Virginia State Route 280.

In early 2002, the Harrisonburg community discussed the possibility of creating a pedestrian mall downtown. Public meetings were held to discuss the merits and drawbacks of pursuing such a plan. Ultimately, the community decided to keep its Main Street open to traffic. From these discussions, however, a strong voice emerged from the community in support of downtown revitalization.

On July 1, 2003, Harrisonburg Downtown Renaissance was incorporated as a 501(c)(3) nonprofit organization with the mission of rejuvenating the downtown district.

In 2004, downtown was designated as the Harrisonburg Downtown Historic District on the National Register of Historic Places and a designated Virginia Main Street Community, with the neighboring Old Town Historic District residential community gaining historic district status in 2007. Several vacant buildings have been renovated and repurposed for new uses, such as the Hardesty-Higgins House and City Exchange, used for the Harrisonburg Tourist Center and high-end loft apartments, respectively.

In 2008, downtown Harrisonburg spent over $1 million in cosmetic and sidewalk infrastructure improvements (also called streetscaping and wayfinding projects). The City Council appropriated $500,000 for custom street signs to be used as "wayfinding signs" directing visitors to areas of interest around the city. Another $500,000 were used to upgrade street lighting, sidewalks, and landscaping along Main Street and Court Square.

In 2014, Downtown Harrisonburg was named a Great American Main Street by the National Main Street Association and downtown was designated the first culinary district in the commonwealth of Virginia.

Norfolk Southern also owns a small railyard in Harrisonburg. The Chesapeake and Western corridor from Elkton to Harrisonburg has very high volumes of grain and ethanol. The railroad serves two major grain elevators inside the city limits. In May 2017 Norfolk Southern 51T derailed in Harrisonburg spilling corn into Blacks Run. No one was injured.

Shenandoah Valley Railroad interchanges with the NS on south side of Harrisonburg and with CSX and Buckingham Branch Railroad in North Staunton.

Harrisonburg Transit provides public transportation in Harrisonburg. Virginia Breeze provides intercity bus service between Blacksburg, Harrisonburg, and Washington, D.C.

The Virginia Breeze intercity bus line added service to Harrisonburg on April 20, 2026, stopping at the Godwin Transit Center at James Madison University. The added service, known as the Tidewater Current, connects to Staunton, Charlottesville, Richmond and Richmond International Airport, Williamsburg, Newport News, Norfolk, and Virginia Beach.

== Culture ==
Harrisonburg has won several awards in recent years, including "#6 Favorite Town in America" by Travel + Leisure in 2016, the "#15 Best City to Raise an Outdoor Kid" by Backpacker in 2009, and the "#3 Happiest Mountain Town" by Blue Ridge Country Magazine in 2016.

Harrisonburg holds the title of "Virginia's first Culinary District" (awarded in 2014). The "Taste of Downtown" (TOD) week-long event takes place annually to showcase local breweries and restaurants. Often referred to as "Restaurant Week," the TOD event offers a chance for culinary businesses in downtown Harrisonburg to create specials, collaborations, and try out new menus.

The creative class of Harrisonburg has grown alongside the revitalization of the downtown district. The designation of "first Arts & Cultural District in Virginia" was awarded to Downtown Harrisonburg in 2001. Contributing to Harrisonburg's cultural capital are a collection of education and art centers, residencies, studios, and artist-facilitated businesses, programs, and collectives.

Some of these programs include:

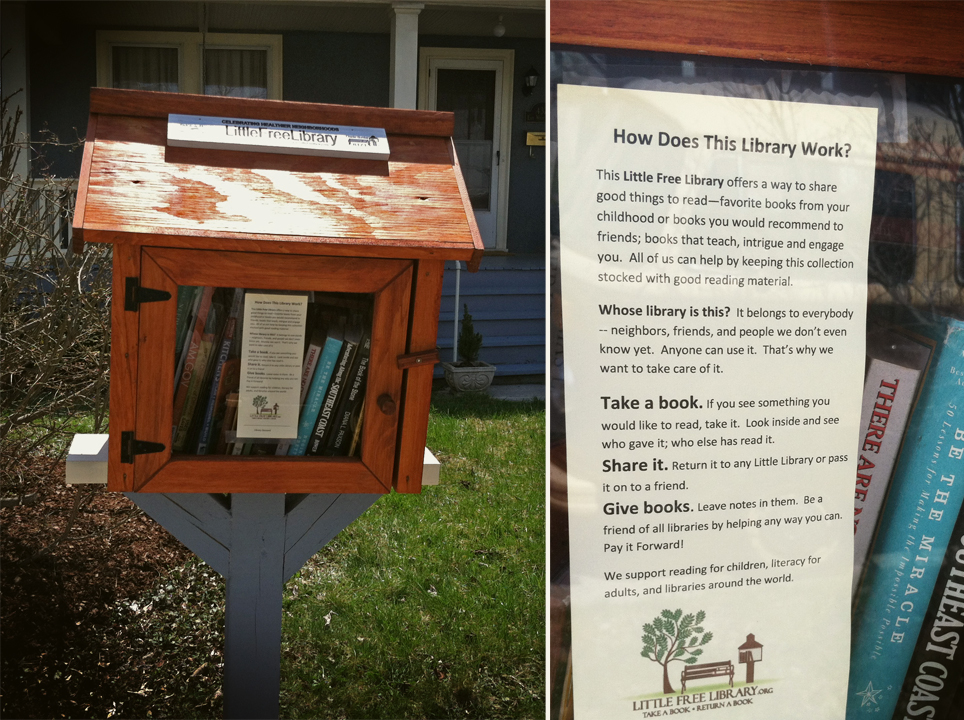
A Little Free Library in Harrisonburg

- The Super Gr8 Film Festival, founded in 2009. The 2013 festival featured more than 50 locally produced films, and all of the films in the festival were shot using vintage cameras and Super 8 film.
- Arts Council of the Valley, including the Darrin-McHone Gallery and Court Square Theater, provides facilities and funding for various arts programs and projects.
- OASIS Fine Art and Craft, opened in 2000, is a cooperative gallery of over 35 local artists and artisans exhibiting and selling their work. It offers fine hand-crafted pottery, jewelry, fiber art, wood, metal, glass, wearable art, paintings, and photography.

=== Historic sites ===
==== The Harrison House (formerly the Thomas Harrison House) ====
The modern city of Harrisonburg grew up around this modest stone house, which until recently was thought to have been erected for Thomas Harrison ca. 1750. But new research and a dendrochronology study completed by James Madison University in 2018 has determined that it was built ca. 1790; Harrison died in 1785. Harrison laid out the town that was to bear his name on fifty acres of his holdings and was also instrumental in having Harrisonburg established as the Rockingham County seat in 1780. Prior to confirmation of the date of construction, it was believed that the first courts were held in this building, which is also associated with Bishop Francis Asbury, a pioneer leader of the Methodist Episcopal church, who often visited Harrison and conducted some of the county's first Methodist services. While the original Thomas Harrison house no longer exists, this building remains an early example of stone vernacular architecture in the Shenandoah Valley, and a contributing building in the Harrisonburg Downtown Historic District. Its window architraves are cut from solid walnut timbers. This house remained in the Harrison family until 1870, which is probably why it was long-thought to have been Thomas Harrison's.

==== Hardesty-Higgins House ====
Home to Harrisonburg's first mayor Isaac Hardesty, the house bears his name and the name of the physician, Henry Higgins, who began construction in 1848. Isaac Hardesty was born in 1795 and became the city's first Mayor by charter on March 16, 1849, incorporating the town of Harrisonburg. Hardesty completed construction of the home by 1853 and lived in the house with his wife, Ann, and two children. He was a successful business man, apothecary, and merchant, and he served on the board of directors of the Valley Turnpike Company.

Isaac Hardesty supported the Union and moved from Harrisonburg during the early part of the Civil War. The Strayer sisters occupied the house and, during their stay, the sisters hosted Union General Nathaniel Banks. The house served as an inn after the war and was home to the Virginia Craftsman, makers of handcrafted furniture, from the 1920s to the 1980s.

==== Harrisonburg Downtown Historic District ====
The approximately 100 acre Harrisonburg Downtown Historic District embraces the historic commercial and institutional core of the city. The principal axis of the district is Main Street, which runs approximately north–south through the district. Another principal thoroughfare is Liberty Street, which parallels Main Street. The principal cross axis is Market Street (US Highway 33), which intersects with Main Street on the east side of Court Square. The Romanesque Revival/Renaissance Revival 1896-97 Rockingham County Courthouse commands the square, and surrounding blocks arc densely developed with early twentieth century high-rise bank buildings and other commercial buildings from the 1870s through the 1950s. Most residential buildings dates to after the Civil War, when South Main Street developed as Harrisonburg's elite residential avenue. Notable houses from the period include Victorian/Queen Anne masterpieces such as Ute 1890 Joshua Wilton House and rarities such as the late 1880s Octagon House. Several fine Gothic Revival churches date to the early years of the twentieth century. Industrial buildings and warehouses date largely to the first half of the twentieth century and include the 1908 City Produce Exchange, a poultry shipping plant, and the late 1920s Maphis Chapman Co. gas storage tank factory. A complex of mid-twentieth century cinder block warehouses clusters near the 1913 Chesapeake Western Railway Station and the 1920-21 Rockingham Milling Co. roller mill on Chesapeake Avenue. Alter World War I automobile dealerships appeared in the downtown area. An outstanding example is the 1920 Rockingham Motor Co., an inspired Tudor Revival/Art Deco design. Architectural modernism achieved popularity in the 1940s and early 1950s at the end of the period of significance. Harrisonburg's downtown experienced a number of losses during the late twentieth century, but the recent rehabilitation of several key buildings demonstrates a growing commitment to the preservation of the district's historic character.

==== Other sites ====
In addition to the Thomas Harrison House, Hardesty-Higgins House, Harrisonburg Downtown Historic District, and Old Town Historic District, the Ida Mae Francis Tourist Home, Newtown Cemetery, Anthony Hockman House, Rockingham County Courthouse, Lucy F. Simms School, Whitesel Brothers, and Joshua Wilton House are listed on the National Register of Historic Places.

== Media ==
Harrisonburg is home to a local television station, several local radio stations, newspapers and independent online news organizations. Local media organizations include:

- WHSV-TV (ABC Affiliate)
- WMRA public radio
- The Daily News-Record newspaper
- The Harrisonburg Citizen, an independent online news organization
- Rocktown Now, part of Saga Communications
- The Breeze, the independent student newspaper at James Madison University
- The Weather Vane, the student-run newspaper at Eastern Mennonite University

== Geography ==
According to the United States Census Bureau, the city has a total area of 17.4 square miles (45.1 km^{2}), of which 17.3 square miles (44.8 km^{2}) is land and 0.1 square miles (0.3 km^{2}) (0.3%) is water. The City of Harrisonburg comprises six watersheds, with Blacks Run being the primary watershed with 8.67 miles of stream and a drainage area of over 9000 acres. The city also drains into the Chesapeake Bay Watershed. Harrisonburg is in the western part of the Shenandoah Valley, a portion of the Valley and Ridge physiographic province. Generally, the area is a rolling upland with local relief between 100 and 300 feet.

== Demographics ==
Historical population
Census	Pop.	Note	%±
1860	1,023		—
1870	2,036		99.0%
1880	2,831		39.0%
1890	2,792		−1.4%
1900	3,521		26.1%
1910	4,879		38.6%
1920	5,875		20.4%
1930	7,232		23.1%
1940	8,768		21.2%
1950	10,810		23.3%
1960	11,916		10.2%
1970	14,605		22.6%
1980	19,671		34.7%
1990	30,707		56.1%
2000	40,468		31.8%
2010	48,914		20.9%
2020	51,814		5.9%
2025 (est.)	50,839	▼	−1.9%
U.S. Decennial Census; 1790-1960 1900-1990; 1990-2000 2010 2020

=== Racial and ethnic composition ===
Harrisonburg city, Virginia – Racial and ethnic composition Note: the US Census treats Hispanic/Latino as an ethnic category. This table excludes Latinos from the racial categories and assigns them to a separate category. Hispanics/Latinos may be of any race.
Race / Ethnicity (NH = Non-Hispanic)	Pop 1980	Pop 1990	Pop 2000	Pop 2010	Pop 2020	% 1980	% 1990	% 2000	% 2010	% 2020
White alone (NH)	18,510	27,691	32,416	35,391	31,454	94.10%	90.18%	80.10%	72.35%	60.71%
Black or African American alone (NH)	873	2,005	2,266	2,911	3,906	4.44%	6.53%	5.60%	5.95%	7.54%
Native American or Alaska Native alone (NH)	13	35	57	67	71	0.07%	0.11%	0.14%	0.14%	0.14%
Asian alone (NH)	129	461	1,247	1,705	2,089	0.66%	1.50%	3.08%	3.49%	4.03%
Native Hawaiian or Pacific Islander alone (NH)	x	x	10	54	20	x	x	0.02%	0.11%	0.04%
Other race alone (NH)	12	34	46	112	196	0.06%	0.11%	0.11%	0.23%	0.38%
Mixed race or Multiracial (NH)	x	x	846	1,009	2,033	x	x	2.09%	2.06%	3.92%
Hispanic or Latino (any race)	134	481	3,580	7,665	12,045	0.68%	1.57%	8.85%	15.67%	23.25%
Total	19,671	30,707	40,468	48,914	51,814	100.00%	100.00%	100.00%	100.00%	100.00%

=== 2020 census ===
As of the 2020 census, Harrisonburg had a population of 51,814. The median age was 23.5 years. 18.1% of residents were under the age of 18 and 10.2% of residents were 65 years of age or older. For every 100 females there were 90.7 males, and for every 100 females age 18 and over there were 87.5 males age 18 and over.

99.4% of residents lived in urban areas, while 0.6% lived in rural areas.

There were 17,413 households in Harrisonburg, of which 27.7% had children under the age of 18 living in them. Of all households, 33.5% were married-couple households, 25.1% were households with a male householder and no spouse or partner present, and 33.9% were households with a female householder and no spouse or partner present. About 28.9% of all households were made up of individuals and 8.3% had someone living alone who was 65 years of age or older.

There were 18,626 housing units, of which 6.5% were vacant. The homeowner vacancy rate was 1.0% and the rental vacancy rate was 4.7%.

Racial composition as of the 2020 census
Race	Number	Percent
White	33,789	65.2%
Black or African American	4,218	8.1%
American Indian and Alaska Native	297	0.6%
Asian	2,116	4.1%
Native Hawaiian and Other Pacific Islander	29	0.1%
Some other race	6,029	11.6%
Two or more races	5,336	10.3%
Hispanic or Latino (of any race)	12,045	23.2%

=== 2010 census ===
This graph, using information from the 2000 federal census, illustrates the uneven distribution of age due to the two universities in Harrisonburg

As of the census of 2010, 48,914 people, 15,988 households, and 7,515 families resided in the city. The population density was 2,811.1/mi^{2} (1,085.4/km^{2}). The 15,988 housing units averaged 918.9 units per square mile (354.8 units/km^{2}). The racial makeup of the city was 78.4% White, 6.4% Black or African American, 0.3% Native American, 3.5% Asian, 0.1% Pacific Islander, 8.2% from other races, and 3.1% from two or more races. Hispanics or Latinos of any race were 15.7% of the population, up from 8.85% according to the census of 2000.

Of the 15,988 households, 22.1% had children under the age of 18 living with them, 32.7% were married couples living together, 10.1% had a female householder with no husband present, and 53.0% were not families. About 27.3% of all households were made up of individuals, and 17.4% had someone living alone who was 65 years of age or older. The average household size was 2.59, and the average family size was 3.06.

In the city, the population was distributed as 15.0% under the age of 18, 48.9% from 18 to 24, 21.2% from 25 to 44, 13.2% from 45 to 64, and 9.3% who were 65 years of age or older. The median age was 22.8 years. For every 100 females, there were 87.3 males.

The median income for a household in the city was $37,850, and for a family was $53,642. The per capita income for the city was $16,992. About 11.5% of families and 31.8% of the population were below the poverty line, including 19.6% of those under age 18 and 9.5% of those age 65 or over.

== Politics ==
United States presidential election results for Harrisonburg, Virginia
Year	Republican		Democratic		Third party(ies)	
Year	No.	%	No.	%	No.	%
1916	319	47.61%	346	51.64%	5	0.75%
1920	704	53.86%	594	45.45%	9	0.69%
1924	631	49.69%	624	49.13%	15	1.18%
1928	1,037	62.73%	616	37.27%	0	0.00%
1932	665	39.30%	995	58.81%	32	1.89%
1936	894	38.92%	1,390	60.51%	13	0.57%
1940	1,000	40.31%	1,462	58.93%	19	0.77%
1944	1,302	50.04%	1,292	49.65%	8	0.31%
1948	1,377	58.55%	751	31.93%	224	9.52%
1952	2,238	77.82%	635	22.08%	3	0.10%
1956	2,265	78.29%	571	19.74%	57	1.97%
1960	2,172	72.04%	836	27.73%	7	0.23%
1964	1,820	50.70%	1,765	49.16%	5	0.14%
1968	2,859	65.69%	1,036	23.81%	457	10.50%
1972	3,626	77.26%	992	21.14%	75	1.60%
1976	3,376	63.01%	1,803	33.65%	179	3.34%
1980	3,388	58.45%	1,896	32.71%	512	8.83%
1984	5,221	68.15%	2,384	31.12%	56	0.73%
1988	5,376	64.86%	2,799	33.77%	113	1.36%
1992	4,935	51.24%	3,414	35.44%	1,283	13.32%
1996	4,945	55.33%	3,346	37.44%	646	7.23%
2000	5,741	57.65%	3,482	34.97%	735	7.38%
2004	6,165	55.89%	4,726	42.85%	139	1.26%
2008	6,048	41.21%	8,444	57.54%	183	1.25%
2012	6,565	42.10%	8,654	55.50%	374	2.40%
2016	6,262	34.80%	10,212	56.76%	1,519	8.44%
2020	5,591	32.72%	11,022	64.51%	473	2.77%
2024	6,266	36.15%	10,641	61.40%	425	2.45%

Like most of the Shenandoah Valley, Harrisonburg was among the first areas of Virginia where old-line Southern Democrats began splitting their tickets. The city went Republican at every presidential election from 1944 to 2004. In 2008, however, Barack Obama carried the city by a margin of 16 percent—slightly larger than the 14-point margin by which George W. Bush carried it four years earlier. The city has voted Democratic in every presidential election since then, and has become one of the few Democratic mainstays in this more conservative part of Virginia. In most elections, it is one of the few areas west of Charlottesville carried by Democrats.

=== Government ===
Harrisonburg city government in the 20th century
City Manager		Mayor			Vice-Mayor		
Term	Name	Term	Name	Party	Term	Name	Party
		Sep 1946– Aug 1948	Bernard Denton				
		Sep 1948– Aug 1950	Lawrence Loewner				
		Sep 1950– Aug 1952	Lawrence Loewner				
		Sep 1952– Aug 1954	Lawrence Loewner				
		Sep 1954– Aug 1956	Walter Green		Sep 1954– Aug 1956	Dan L. Logan	R
		Sep 1956– Aug 1958	Frank C. Switzer		Sep 1956– Aug 1958	Dan L. Logan	R
		Sep 1958– Aug 1960	Frank C. Switzer		Sep 1958– Aug 1960	Dan L. Logan	R
		Sep 1960– Aug 1962	Frank C. Switzer		Sep 1960– Aug 1962	Dan L. Logan	R
		Sep 1962– Aug 1964	Frank C. Switzer		Sep 1962– Aug 1964	Dan L. Logan	R
		Sep 1964– Aug 1966	Frank C. Switzer				
		Sep 1966– Aug 1968	Frank C. Switzer		Jun 1966	Joseph Mintzer	D
		Sep 1968– Aug 1970	Roy Hjalmar Erickson	R	Sep 1968– Aug 1970	Royal Kincheloe	
1969–1974	Marvin B. Milam	Sep 1968– Aug 1970	Roy Hjalmar Erickson	R	Sep 1968– Aug 1970	Royal Kincheloe	
1969–1974	Marvin B. Milam	Sep 1970– Aug 1972	Roy Hjalmar Erickson	R	Sep 1970– Aug 1972	Edgar Warren Denton Jr.	
Sep 1974– Aug 1976	Marvin B. Milam	Sep 1974– Aug 1976	Roy Hjalmar Erickson	R	Sep 1974– Aug 1976	Edgar Warren Denton Jr.	
Sep 1976– Aug 1978	Marvin B. Milam	Sep 1976– Aug 1978	Roy Hjalmar Erickson	R	Sep 1976– Aug 1978	Edgar Warren Denton Jr.	
Sep 1978– Aug 1980	Marvin B. Milam	Sep 1978– Aug 1980	Roy Hjalmar Erickson	R	Sep 1978– Aug 1980	Walter Franklin Green III.	
Sep 1980– Aug 1982	Marvin B. Milam	Sep 1980– Aug 1982	Roy Hjalmar Erickson	R	Sep 1980– Aug 1982	Walter Franklin Green III.	
Sep 1982– Jun 1984	Marvin B. Milam	Sep 1982– Jun 1983	Roy Hjalmar Erickson	R	Sep 1982– Jun 1983	Walter Franklin Green III.	
Sep 1982– Jun 1984	Marvin B. Milam	Jul 1983– Jun 1984	Walter Franklin Green III.		Jul 1983– Jun 1984	Raymond C. Dingledine Jr.	
Jul 1984– Jun 1986	Marvin B. Milam	Jul 1984– Jun 1986	Walter Franklin Green III.		Jul 1984– Jun 1986	Raymond C. Dingledine Jr.	
Jul 1986– Jun 1988	Marvin B. Milam	Jul 1986– Jun 1988	Walter Franklin Green III.		Jul 1986– Jun 1988	Raymond C. Dingledine Jr.	
Jul 1988– Jun 1990	Marvin B. Milam	Jul 1988– Jun 1990	Walter Franklin Green III.		Jul 1988– Jun 1990	Raymond C. Dingledine Jr.	
Jul 1990– Sep 1991	Marvin B. Milam	Jul 1990– Jun 1992	Walter Franklin Green III.		Jul 1990– Jun 1992	Elon W. Rhodes	
Oct 1991– Oct 1992	Roger D. Baker (acting)	Jul 1990– Jun 1992	Walter Franklin Green III.		Jul 1990– Jun 1992	Elon W. Rhodes	
Oct 1991– Oct 1992	Roger D. Baker (acting)	Jul 1992– Jun 1994	C. Robert Heath		Jul 1992– Jun 1994	John N. Neff	
Nov 1992– Jun 1994	Steven E. Stewart	Jul 1992– Jun 1994	C. Robert Heath		Jul 1992– Jun 1994	John N. Neff	
Jul 1994– 1997	Steven E. Stewart	Jul 1994– Jun 1996	John N. Neff		Jul 1994– Jun 1996	Emily R. Dingledine	
Jul 1994– 1997	Steven E. Stewart	Jul 1996– Jun 1998	Rodney L. Eagle	I	Jul 1996– Jun 1998	Hugh. J. Lantz	R
1997–Sep 2000	Steven E. Stewart	Jul 1996– Jun 1998	Rodney L. Eagle	I	Jul 1996– Jun 1998	Hugh. J. Lantz	R
1997–Sep 2000	Steven E. Stewart	Jul 1998– Jun 2000	Rodney L. Eagle	I	Jul 1998– Jun 2000	Hugh. J. Lantz	R

Harrisonburg city government in the 21st century
City Manager		Mayor			Vice-Mayor		
Term	Name	Term	Name	Party	Term	Name	Party
1997–Sep 2000	Steven E. Stewart	Jul 1998– Jun 2000	Rodney L. Eagle	I	Jul 1998– Jun 2000	Hugh. J. Lantz	R
1997–Sep 2000	Steven E. Stewart	Jul 2000– Jun 2002	Carolyn W. Frank	I	Jul 2000– Jun 2002	Dorn W. Peterson	
Sep 2000– Jun 2004	Roger Baker	Jul 2000– Jun 2002	Carolyn W. Frank	I	Jul 2000– Jun 2002	Dorn W. Peterson	
Sep 2000– Jun 2004	Roger Baker	Jul 2002– Jun 2004	Joseph Gus Fitzgerald	D	Jul 2002– Jun 2004	Larry M. Rogers	D
Jul 2004– Jun 2007	Roger Baker	Jul 2004– Jun 2006	Larry M. Rogers	D	Jul 2004– Jun 2006	Rodney L. Eagle	I
Jul 2004– Jun 2007	Roger Baker	Jul 2006– Dec 2008	Rodney L. Eagle	I	Jul 2006– Dec 2008	George W. Pace	
Jul 2007– Dec 2010	Kurt D. Hodgen	Jul 2006– Dec 2008	Rodney L. Eagle	I	Jul 2006– Dec 2008	George W. Pace	
Jul 2007– Dec 2010	Kurt D. Hodgen	Jan 2009– Dec 2010	Kai Degner	D	Jan 2009– Dec 2010	Richard A. Baugh	D
Jan 2011–Oct 31, 2017	Kurt D. Hodgen	Jan 2011– 2012	Richard A. Baugh	D	Jan 2011– 2012	Ted Byrd	R
Jan 2011–Oct 31, 2017	Kurt D. Hodgen	Jan 2013– Dec 2014	Ted Byrd	R	Jan 2013– Dec 2014	Charles R. Chenault	I
Jan 2011–Oct 31, 2017	Kurt D. Hodgen	Jan 2015– Dec 2016	Christopher B. Jones	D	Jan 2015– Dec 2016	Richard Baugh	D
Jan 2011–Oct 31, 2017	Kurt D. Hodgen	Jan 3, 2017– Jan 1, 2019	Deanna R. Reed	D	Jan 3, 2017– Jan 1, 2019	Richard Baugh	D
Nov 1, 2017 – Jan 15, 2018	Ande Banks (acting)	Jan 3, 2017– Jan 1, 2019	Deanna R. Reed	D	Jan 3, 2017– Jan 1, 2019	Richard Baugh	D
Jan 16, 2018 – Dec 31, 2021	Eric Campbell	Jan 3, 2017– Jan 1, 2019	Deanna R. Reed	D	Jan 3, 2017– Jan 1, 2019	Richard Baugh	D
Jan 16, 2018 – Dec 31, 2021	Eric Campbell	Jan 2, 2019– Jan 3, 2021	Deanna R. Reed	D	Jan 2, 2019– Jan 3, 2021	Sal Romero	D
Jan 16, 2018 – Dec 31, 2021	Eric Campbell	Jan 4, 2021– Jan 2, 2023	Deanna R. Reed	D	Jan 4, 2021– Jan 2, 2023	Sal Romero	D
Jan 1, 2022 – Jan 2, 2023	Ande Banks (acting)	Jan 4, 2021– Jan 2, 2023	Deanna R. Reed	D	Jan 4, 2021– Jan 2, 2023	Sal Romero	D
Jan 3, 2023–Jan 1, 2025	Ande Banks	Jan 3, 2023–Jan 1, 2025	Deanna R. Reed	D	Jan 3, 2023–Jan 1, 2025	Laura Dent	D
Jan 2, 2025–incumbent	Ande Banks	Jan 2, 2025–incumbent	Deanna R. Reed	D	Jan 2, 2025–incumbent	Dany Fleming	D

== Education ==
=== School systems ===
Serving 6,830 students (K–12) as of fall 2024, Harrisonburg City Public Schools comprises six elementary schools, two middle schools, and two high schools. Eastern Mennonite School, a private school, serves grades K–12 with an enrollment of about 386 students.

=== Higher education ===
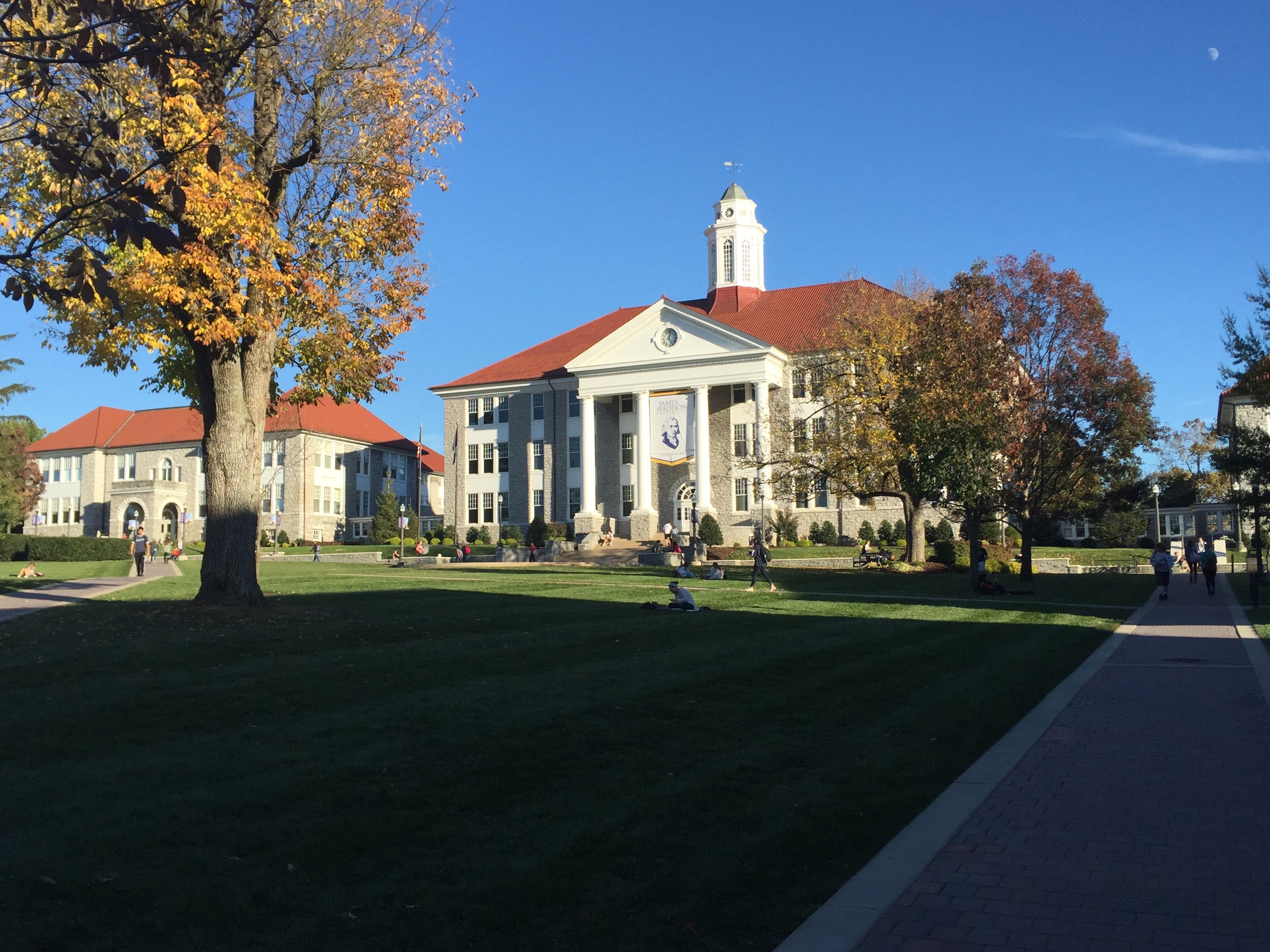
James Madison University is the largest higher education institution in Harrisonburg.

- James Madison University (public)
- Eastern Mennonite University (private, Mennonite-affiliated)
- American National University (private, for-profit) [defunct]
- National College (private, for-profit) [defunct]

=== High schools ===
- Harrisonburg High School
- Rocktown High School

=== Middle schools ===
- Skyline Middle School
- Thomas Harrison Middle School

=== Elementary schools ===
- Bluestone Elementary
- Smithland Elementary
- Spotswood Elementary
- Stone Spring Elementary
- Waterman Elementary
- W.H. Keister Elementary

=== Other schools ===
- Elon W. Rhodes Early Learning Center

=== Technical schools ===
- Massanutten Regional Governors School
- Massanutten Technical Center

=== Private schools ===
- Blue Ridge Christian School
- Eastern Mennonite School
- Redeemer Classical School

== Points of interest ==
- Downtown Harrisonburg
- Edith J. Carrier Arboretum
- Hardesty-Higgins House Visitor Center
- Harrisonburg's Old Post Office Mural (Now US Bankruptcy Court)

== Events ==
- The Alpine Loop Gran Fondo - A road-cycling event hosted by professional cyclist Jeremiah Bishop that starts and finishes in downtown Harrisonburg.
- The Harrisonburg International Festival - An annual event that celebrates international foods, dance, music, and folk art.
- Valley Fourth - Downtown Harrisonburg's Fourth of July celebrations that include a morning run, food trucks, beer and music garden, kids' area, art market, craft and clothing vendors, and fireworks.
- Christmas/Holiday Parade
- Taste of Downtown - A food event held yearly in March.
- MACROCK - An independent music conference held in the downtown area of Harrisonburg the first weekend of April. It has been held annually since 1997.
- Skeleton Festival - An event that blends aspects of Halloween and Dia de los Muertos. Activities kick off with trick-or-treating at downtown businesses and culminating with a party at the Turner Pavilion & Park. The festival features kid, dog, and adult costume contests; face painting; fire dancing; food trucks; live music; a community ofrenda; video art; "trunk or treating"; wacky shacks; goober blobs; and whisker biscuits.
- Rocktown Beer & Music Festival - An event held each Spring. It features over 75 different beers and ciders. The band lineup changes each year and food is supplied by some of the local downtown restaurants.

== Sports ==
- Eastern Mennonite Royals (NCAA Division III, Old Dominion Athletic Conference)
  - 2010 Division III Men's Basketball Elite 8 qualifiers
  - 2004 Women's Basketball Sweet 16 qualifiers
- Harrisonburg Turks (Valley Baseball League)
- Harrisonburg Turks (minor league baseball) (1939 to 1941 Virginia League, 1939 league champions)
- James Madison Dukes (NCAA Division I, Football Bowl Subdivision, Sun Belt Conference)
  - 1994 NCAA Division I Field Hockey National Champions
  - 2004 NCAA Division I-AA Football National Champions
  - 2016 NCAA Division I Football Championship National Champions
  - 2018 NCAA Division I Women's Lacrosse National Champions

== Climate ==
The climate in this area is characterized by hot, humid summers and generally cool to cold winters. Harrisonburg has a humid subtropical climate, Cfa on climate maps according to the Köppen climate classification, but has four clearly defined seasons that vary significantly, if not having brief changes from summer to winter. The USDA hardiness zone is 6b, which means average minimum winter temperature of −5 to 0 °F (−21 to −18 °C).

== Notable people ==
=== Born ===
- David Avison, American photographer and physicist
- Brian Bocock, former MLB player
- Pasco Bowman II, Judge of the U.S. Court of Appeals for the Eighth Circuit (1983–1999)
- Camillo C. C. Carr (1842–1914), US Army brigadier general
- Nelson Chittum, former MLB player
- James H. Cravens, U.S. Representative from Indiana (1841–1843)
- Clement Conger, White House Curator (1970–1990)
- Dell Curry, former NBA player; father of NBA players Stephen Curry and Seth Curry
- Page Dunlap, former LPGA Tour member and 1986 winner of the individual NCAA Division I Women's Golf Championship
- Dan Forest, 34th Lieutenant Governor of North Carolina (2013–2021)
- Richard F. Garber, Hall of Fame college lacrosse coach
- Brenan Hanifee, MLB pitcher
- Alan Knicely, former MLB player
- Edgar Amos Love, American bishop involved with the civil rights movement and founder of Omega Psi Phi
- Tom Lough, former modern pentathlete and competitor in the 1968 Summer Olympics
- John Paul Jr., U.S. Representative from Virginia (1922–1923); U.S. Attorney for the Western District of Virginia (1929–1932); Judge for the Western District of Virginia (1932–1958), whose school desegregation rulings set off Massive Resistance by Virginia officials
- Thomas F. Riley, Brigadier general in the Marine Corps, later served as Orange County Supervisor (1974–1994)
- Jeremiah Sullivan, Justice of the Indiana Supreme Court
- Kaitlyn Vincie, Fox NASCAR reporter and NASCAR Race Hub presenter
- Maggie Stiefvater, bestselling author

=== Raised ===
- Samuel B. Avis, U.S. Representative from West Virginia (1913–1915)
- Charles B. Gatewood, United States Military Academy graduate and United States Army Lieutenant who convinced Chiricahua Apache leader Geronimo to surrender to the Army in 1886
- John H. Gibbons, nuclear physicist; Director of the White House Office of Science and Technology Policy (1993–1998)
- William Conrad Gibbons, historian and Vietnam War expert
- Akeem Jordan, former NFL player
- Edgar Amos Love, co-founder of Omega Psi Phi fraternity
- John Otho Marsh Jr., U.S. Representative from Virginia (1963–1971); Secretary of the Army (1981–1989)
- Bill Mims, Justice of the Supreme Court of Virginia (2010–2022); former Attorney General of Virginia (2009–2010)
- Ralph Sampson, former NBA player
- Howard Stevens, former NFL player
- Josh Sundquist, paralympian, bestselling author, and motivational speaker
- Kristi Toliver, current WNBA player and NBA assistant coach
- Landon Turner, former NFL player
- John Wade, former NFL player

=== Resident ===
- Jeremiah Bishop, cross-country mountain bike racer
- John T. "Judge" Harris, U.S. Representative from Virginia (1859–1861, 1871–1881)
- Daryl Irvine, former MLB pitcher for parts of three seasons
- John R. Jones, brigadier general in Confederate States Army
- Gus Niarhos, former MLB catcher for nine seasons
- Mark Obenshain, Republican nominee in Virginia Attorney General Election of 2013; member of the Senate of Virginia (2004–present)
- Charles Triplett "Trip" O'Ferrall, U.S. Representative for Virginia (1883–1894), 42nd governor of Virginia (1894–1898)
- John Birdsell Oren, U.S. Coast Guard Rear admiral
- Sofia Samatar, award-winning writer
- Howard Zehr, pioneer of restorative justice

=== Other ===
- Happy the Man, progressive rock band formed in Harrisonburg
- Illiterate Light, alternative-rock duo formed in Harrisonburg
- Old Crow Medicine Show, Americana string band formed in Harrisonburg

== See also ==
- Harrisonburg Department of Public Transportation
- National Register of Historic Places listings in Harrisonburg, Virginia
- Virginia Mennonite Conference
