= Zenda, Virginia =

Zenda Little Africa; Old Athens
- Unincorporated community (historical)
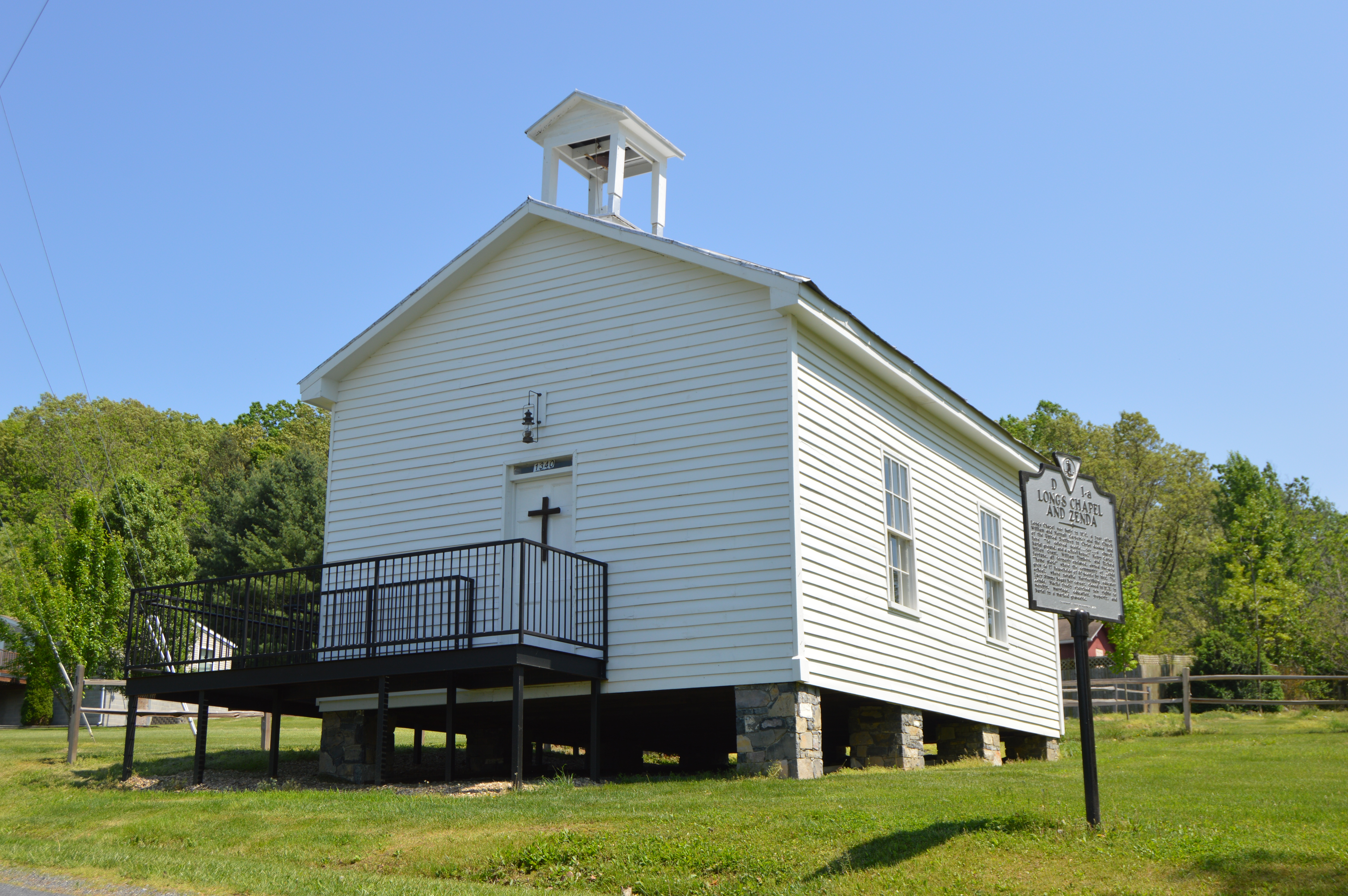
- Long's Chapel in the Zenda community

- Location in Virginia Zenda (the United States)
- Coordinates: 38.505°N 78.769°W
- Country: United States
- State: Virginia
- County: Rockingham
- Founded: 1869
- Founder: Henry Carter, Milton Grant, William Timbers, Richard Fortune
- Time zone: UTC-5 (Eastern)
  - Summer (DST): UTC-4 (EDT)
- Website: Rockingham County Public Schools Local History

Zenda was an African-American community in Rockingham County, Virginia, in the Shenandoah Valley, established in 1869 during the Reconstruction era. Founded by formerly enslaved people and freeborn African Americans, the community included Black landowners and institutions, including a church, school, and cemetery in the decades following the American Civil War. At its peak around 1900, Zenda had approximately 17 households, more than 80 residents, a post office, a school, a chapel, and a cemetery.

== History ==
=== Founding ===
After the Civil War, Rockingham County reclaimed the approximately 50-acre property from a former plantation owner through litigation. The county decided to sell the land to formerly enslaved people.

Henry Carter, Milton Grant, William Timbers, and Richard Fortune were the first people to settle there, each on two acres. These men are also credited with naming the community Zenda. The community was also known as Little Africa and Old Athens.

The land for Zenda came from part of a farm which William and Hannah Carpenter deeded to trustees of the Church of the United Brethren in Christ for the use of Black residents of the area. The deed specified that the property was to be used for a church, burial ground, and schoolhouse "for the colored people in this community ... and to their successors forever."

=== Community life ===
Zenda developed as a rural Black community with homes, a church, a school, and a cemetery. Residents built homes and acquired additional land over time. It reached as many as 100 residents, with families living on 1-to-2-acre lots. Adults worked primarily on neighboring farms. Others were employed as hotel workers (e.g., a bellhop), carpenters, or mail carriers. Many women in the community listed their occupations as homemakers.

The members of Zenda organized a fraternal and beneficial society called the Zenda Aid Society. The society's constitution began, "We the people of Zenda, in order to foster those relations which should exist among neighbors and advance our own interests, do draw, adopt, declare and proclaim this constitution." The society made payments from a common treasury to its members for sick benefits and death losses, the latter capped at $10. In 1904, the president of the society was Fannie Wilson.

Community life is well chronicled in the Rockingham Register newspaper, in a "From Zenda" section. Some snippets include:

- "Several of our young people visited Tide Spring Sunday."
- "Misses Susie and Stella Simmers were visiting the Misses Layman Saturday and Sunday."
- "Miss Halsie Armentrout returned home yesterday after spending some time with her grandmother, Mrs. A. Bazzle, of Melrose."
- "Rev. S. K. Wine will hold an all day bush meeting near Mr. Templeman's store next Sunday."

=== Community members ===
Robert Reid lived his whole life in the Zenda community. He was a merchant turned farmer, noted for his generosity in helping others. He was active in Democratic circles and was a member of the precinct committee. At age 69, a car struck him on Valley Pike near the Virginia Caverns gas station, and he subsequently died in the hospital.

=== Education ===
Education was an important part of community life in Zenda. Longs Chapel housed the community's first school. In 1877 Lucy F. Simms began her teaching career there before later becoming a prominent Black educator in Harrisonburg. In 1882, another school building known as the Athens School or Athens Colored School was built.

In 1922, the school's capacity was 28 students, with 25 enrolled and about 13 attending regularly. Because there were few schools for African-American children in the surrounding countryside, students traveled from as far away as Keezletown to attend.

=== 20th century ===
In the early 1900s, some residents moved away. The Athens School closed accordingly in 1925. Students from Zenda then attended Effinger Street School in Harrisonburg. In 1940, one Black family lived in Zenda. The Brethren held the site of Long's Chapel in trust afterward, until eventually transferring to private ownership.

=== 21st century ===
In 2003, South Carolina black-history preservationists Al and Robin Jenkins happened upon Long's Chapel and bought the site from a neighbor who had purchased it in a tax sale. It was obscured by a thicket of woods, and a Harrisonburg excavation firm cleared the trees and brush for free after a local media report about the site and its history. "Here were some former slaves who worked on plantations starting their own community. I don't think the full story has ever been told, as far as their contribution to society," said Al Jenkins.
