= Newtown, Virginia (historical community) =

Newtown was a historically black community in the Shenandoah Valley of Virginia.

== History ==
When enslaved peoples in the Shenandoah Valley were freed in 1865, they established a town called "Newtown" near modern-day Harrisonburg, Virginia. This town was eventually annexed by the independent city of Harrisonburg some years later, probably around 1892. Today, the old city of Newtown is in the Northeast section of Harrisonburg in the area referred to as Downtown Harrisonburg. It remains the home of the majority of Harrisonburg's predominantly Black churches, such as First Baptist and Bethel AME. The modern Boys and Girls Club of Harrisonburg is located in the old Lucy Simms schoolhouse that was used for Black students in the days of segregation.

=== Project R-4 and R-16 ===
A large portion of this Black neighborhood was dismantled in the 1960s when – in the name of urban renewal – the city government used federal redevelopment funds from the Housing Act of 1949 to force Black families out of their homes and then bulldozed the neighborhood. This effort, called "Project R-4", focused on the city blocks east of Main, north of Gay, west of Broad, and south of Johnson. This area makes up 32.5 acres. "Project R-16" is a smaller tag on project which focused on the 7.5 acres south of Gay Street.

According to Bob Sullivan, an intern working in the city planner's office in 1958, the city planner at the time, David Clark, convinced the city council that Harrisonburg had slums. Newtown, a low socioeconomic status housing area, was declared a slum. Federal law mandated that the city needed to have a referendum on the issue before R-4 could begin. The vote was close with 1,024 votes in favor and 978 against R-4. In 1955, following the vote, the Harrisonburg Redevelopment and Housing Authority was established to carry out the project. All of the group's members were White men. Invoking the power of eminent domain, the government forced people in Newtown to sell their homes. Residents were offered payments for their homes far below their true real estate value. Many people could not afford a new home and had to move into public housing projects. Other families left Harrisonburg. It is estimated between 93 and 200 families were displaced.

In addition to families, many of the businesses of Newtown that were bought out could not afford to reestablish themselves. Locals say many prominent Black businesses like the Colonnade, which served as a pool hall, dance hall, community center, and tearoom, were unable to reopen. Kline's, a White-owned business, was one of the few businesses in the area that was able to reopen. The city later made $500,000 selling the seized property to redevelopers. Before the project, the area brought in $7000 in taxes annually. By 1976, the areas redeveloped in R-4 and R-16 were bringing in $45,000 in annual taxes. These profit gains led Lauren McKinney to regard the project as "one of only two 'profitable' redevelopment schemes in the state of Virginia".

Cultural landmarks were also influenced by the projects. Although later rebuilt, the Old First Baptist Church of Harrisonburg was demolished. Newtown Cemetery, a Historic African American Cemetery, was also impacted. Although it appears that no burials were destroyed, the western boundary was paved over and several headstones now touch the street.
