= Longs =

Longs could refer to:

== Places ==
=== United States ===
- Longs, South Carolina, an unincorporated community
- Longs Chapel, Virginia
- Longs Peak, a mountain in Estes Park, Colorado
- Longs Pond, Washington
- Longs Run, a river in West Virginia

=== Antarctica ===
- Longs Nunatak

== Other uses ==
- Longs Drugs, an American pharmacy chain
- Henry Longs (died 2021), Nigerian politician

== See also ==
- Longs Chapel, Zenda, Virginia, United States, on the National Register of Historic Places
- Miletus chinensis longeana, also known as Long's brownie, a subspecies of butterfly
- The Way We Walk, Volume Two: The Longs, a 1993 Genesis album
- Long (disambiguation)
- Longes, a French commune
