= Lucy F. Simms =

Teacher in Harrisonburg (1855–1934)

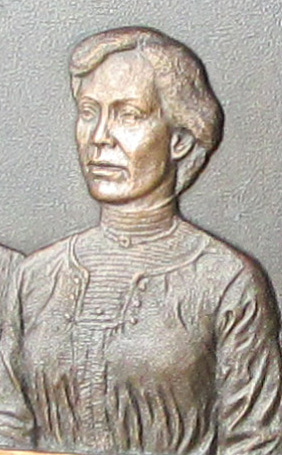
- Born: 1855 or 1856; Harrisonburg or Roanoke, Virginia, USA
- Died: July 10, 1934 aged 77; 321 East Johnson Street, Harrisonburg
- Resting place: Newtown Cemetery, National Register of Historic Places
- Citizenship: American, initially enslaved
- Education: Hampton College
- Employer: Effinger Street School
- Known for: teacher and education leader
- Board member of: President, National Colored Teachers Association

Lucy F. Simms (1855 or 1856 − 1934) was a former slave and educator who lived in Harrisonburg, Virginia, USA. She is one of those commemorated on the Emancipation and Freedom Monument in Richmond, Virginia.

== Personal life ==
Lucy Frances (or Francis) Simms was born enslaved in 1855 or 1856 on one of the estates owned by the Gray family in either Harrisonburg or Roanoke, Virginia. Her mother was Jane Simms, who married John Wilson in 1865. Simms was a Methodist of strong moral convictions and was held in great esteem and affection by both school children and the community.

== Career ==
Formal education for emancipated slaves became available from 1863, after the American Civil War, although they were not permitted to attend the existing schools. In Harrisonburg purpose-built school buildings were provided by the state after 1870. Simms was initially educated in Harrisonburg at the Whipple School founded by the Freedmen's Bureau but from 1874 she attended the Hampton Institute in Virginia and graduated in 1877 with a teaching certificate of the first degree. While at college she met Booker T. Washington who was also a student there. Simms returned to Harrisonburg in 1877.

Simms became a leader promoting education in Harrisonburg. During her 56 year teaching career she is estimated to have taught 1800 pupils over three generations. She taught at three schools. Her first post from 1877 was at Longs Chapel, also known as the Athens Colored School in a settlement later called Zenda. She moved to a better salary at a school located in the basement of Harrisonburg's Catholic Church and then in 1882 to the newly constructed Effinger Street School in north-eastern Harrisonburg where she remained for 52 years. The school's site was on the former Hilltop estate of the Gray family. During her career she returned to the Hampton Institute several times for continuing professional development courses that were held during summer vacations.

In 1914 she became the president of the Colored Teachers Association and also a member of a committee for war work during the First World War. In 1925 she was presented with a silver cup by the citizens of Harrisonburg in recognition of her public service. She continued teaching until the end of the 1933-34 school year.

== Death and legacy ==
Simms died on July 10, 1934. Her funeral was a public event with people, especially children, lining the route from her home to the Newtown Cemetery.

After the Effinger Street school was rebuilt in 1938, it was re-named the Lucy F. Simms School in 1939. The Lucy F. Simms Educator of the Year award was initiated in 2008 to recognize excellence in local education. The Emancipation and Freedom Monument in Richmond, Virginia was inaugurated in 2021 and includes Simms's name, photograph and story. She was selected for inclusion from among a hundred candidates and was included as one of five Virginians of note who fought for equality after emancipation in 1863. From 2021 a biography of Simms will be used in Rockingham County and Harrisonburg schools in Virginia within the history and social studies curriculum.
