= Melrose Caverns and Harrison Farmstead =

- U.S. National Register of Historic Places
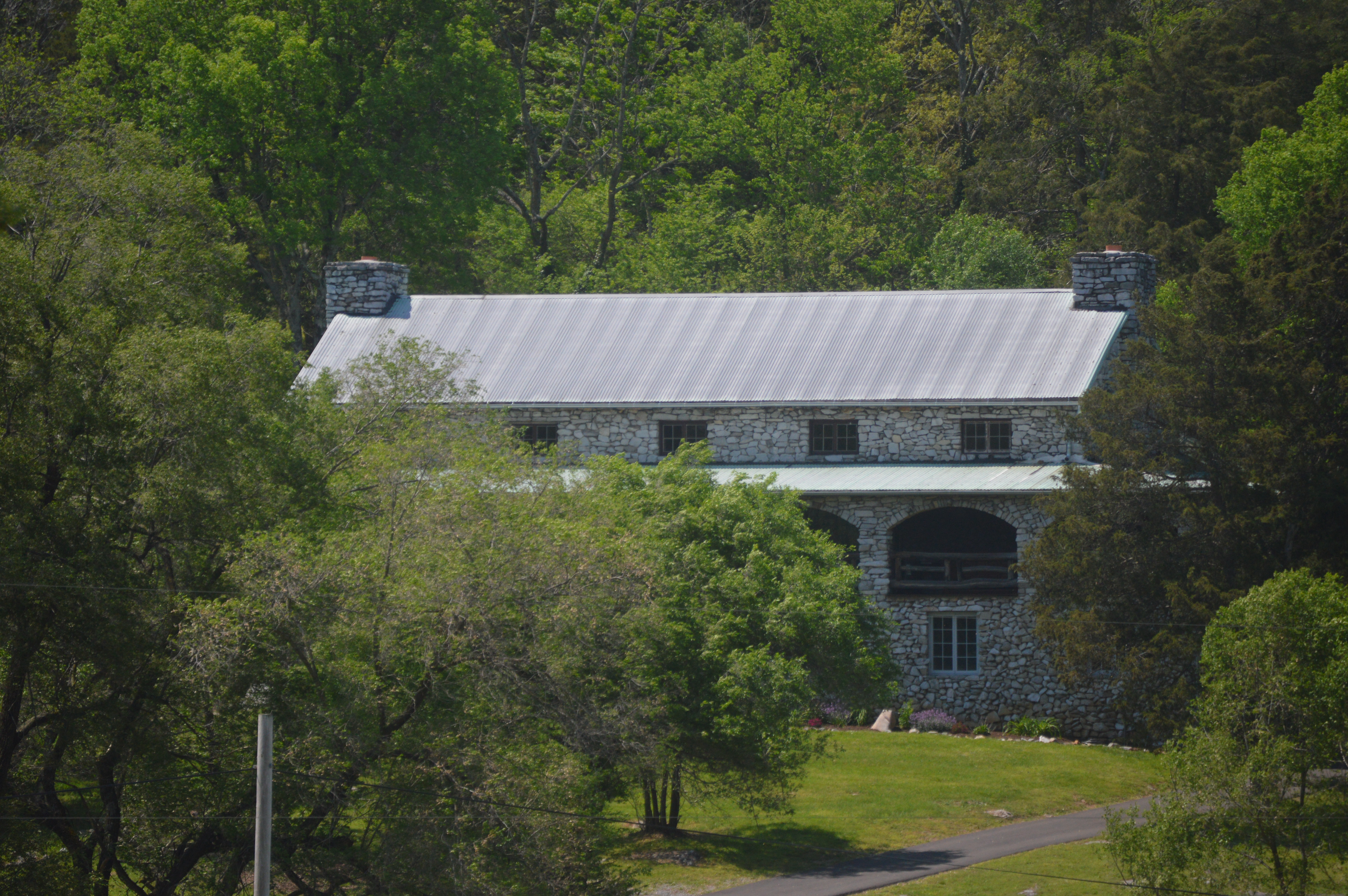
- Melrose Lodge

- Location within Virginia Location within the United States
- Location: 6639 N. U.S. Route 11, near Harrisonburg, Virginia
- Coordinates: 38°31′2″N 78°47′30″W
- Area: 142 acres (57 ha)
- NRHP reference No.: 14000237
- Added to NRHP: May 14, 2014

Melrose Caverns and Harrison Farmstead is a historic property in rural Rockingham County, Virginia. It is located at 6639 North Valley Pike along United States Route 11 north of Harrisonburg, Virginia in the central Shenandoah Valley. The 142-acre property includes a limestone cave system known as Melrose Caverns as well as historic farm structures associated with the Harrison family farmstead.

The caverns are notable for Civil War-era inscriptions left by soldiers in 1862 and for their later development as a roadside tourist attraction during the early twentieth century.

The property was listed on the Virginia Landmarks Register on March 20, 2014, and added to the National Register of Historic Places on May 14, 2014.

== History ==
=== Harrison family farmstead ===
The property was given to John Harrison as part of a colonial land grant from King George II of Great Britain in 1748. It has been handed down through the family and is now owned by the 10th generation.

The property includes a c. 1859 Greek Revival farmhouse and numerous agricultural outbuildings associated with nineteenth-century farming operations, one of which is a log-structure summer kitchen that may be as old as 1820.

=== Discovery of the caverns ===
The entrance to the caverns was reportedly discovered in 1818 by John Harrison Sr., a member of the Harrison family and brother of Thomas Harrison, founder of Harrisonburg. The caverns remained a local curiosity for many years before being developed as a tourist attraction.

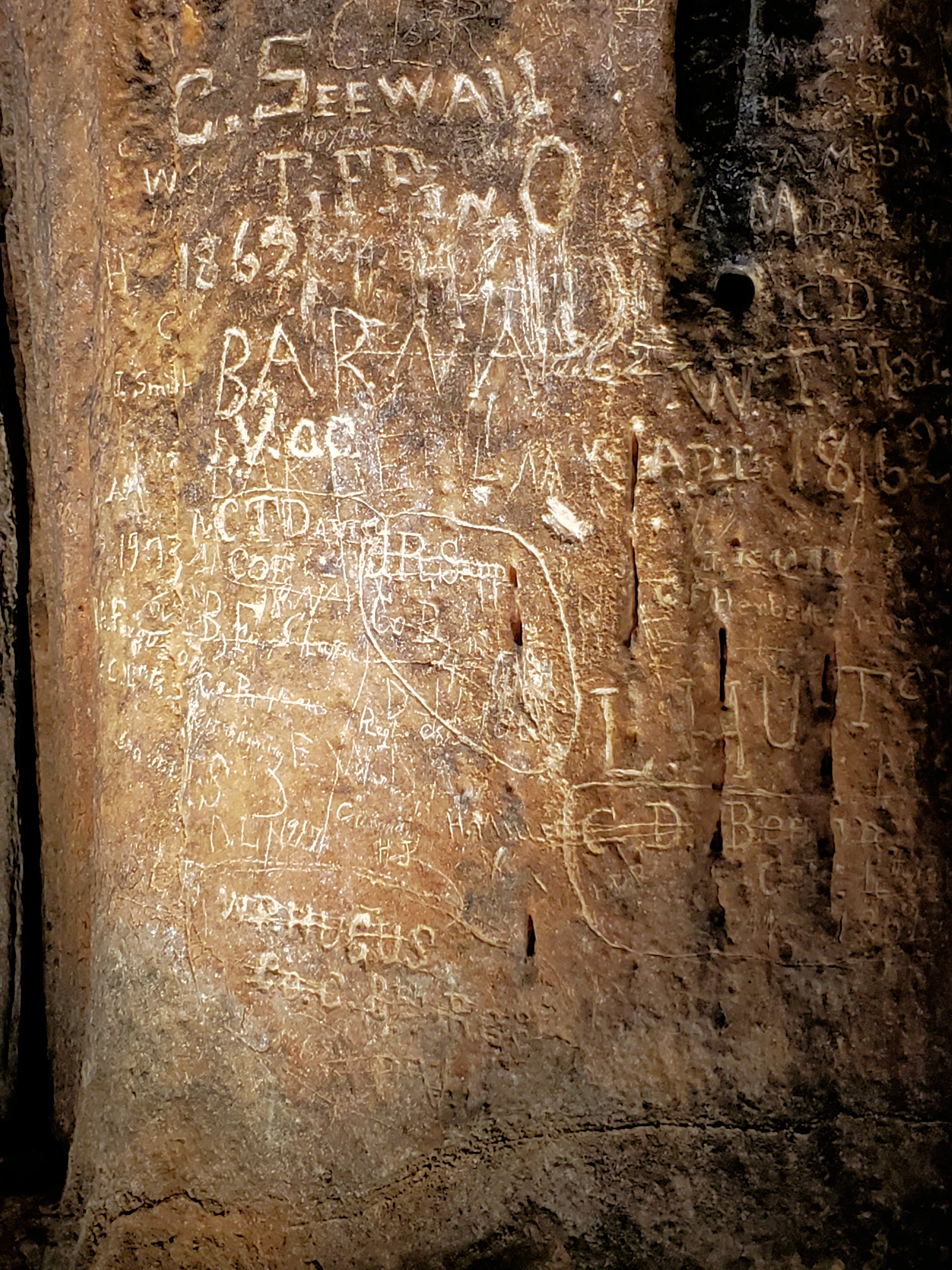
A wall of signatures left by union soldiers during the Civil War in 1862

=== Civil War use ===
During the American Civil War, military campaigns frequently passed through the Shenandoah Valley.

In April 1862, Union forced under the command of Nathaniel P. Banks advanced south along the Valley Pike toward Harrisonburg. Soldiers discovered the caverns and explored their chambers using torches.

More than 150 inscriptions remain on the walls of the caverns, including names, dates, and drawings left by soldiers. Many of these inscriptions are dated to 1862. Among the carvings are a Union shield and a likeness of Abraham Lincoln. Some cave formations also bear marks believed to have been caused by musket fire.

Because the cave environment is sheltered from weather and sunlight, these carvings and impacts have remained relatively well preserved.

=== Development as a tourist attraction ===
In 1929, Colonel Edward Brown, the developer of Endless Caverns, leased the Harrison property containing the caverns in order to develop the site as a commercial tourist attraction.

Brown constructed a rustic lodge and a roadside filling station from locally sourced limestone on the property. The caverns opened to visitors in 1932 under the name Blue Grottoes, the Civil War Caverns, and the lodge housed a small Civil War museum.

The attraction was later renamed Virginia Caverns, but objections from other commercial cave operators in the region led to the site being renamed Melrose Caverns.

During the mid-twentieth century the caverns benefited from automobile tourism along U.S. Route 11, which served as a major travel corridor through the Shenandoah Valley.

=== Closure ===
By the mid-1960s tourism patterns shifted following the construction of Interstate 81, which diverted much through-traffic away from U.S. Route 11.

Commercial tours of the caverns ceased in 1967, and the property returned to use by the Harrison family.

=== Later uses and reopening ===
Following the closure of the caverns as a tourist attraction, the stone lodge on the property served several other uses. From 1967 to 1973 it operated as a theatre space used by students from James Madison University, then known as Madison College.

In the early 2010s restoration work was undertaken to prepare the caverns for reopening to visitors. Volunteers from the Virginia Region of the National Speleological Society assisted with cleanup, mapping, and installation of protective barriers.

Guided tours of Melrose Caverns resumed in 2020.

== Geology ==
Melrose Caverns in a limestone cave formed with the karst landscape of the Shenandoah Valley. The cave contains a variety of speleothems, including stalactites, stalagmites, shields, soda straws, flowstone, and cave popcorn formations.

The interior of the caverns maintains a relatively constant temperature of approximately 55 °F (13 °C) year-round.

== Modern use ==
Today Melrose Caverns operates as a historic tourism site offering guided tours focused on both cave geology and Civil War history. The property also functions as an event venue.

In 2024, signage associated with Virginia Civil War Trails was installed at the site to highlight its Civil War history.

The site also hosts Cave Comedy Fest, an annual event held every July.

== See also ==
- National Register of Historic Places listings in Rockingham County, Virginia
