= Emancipation and Freedom Monument =

Monument in Richmond, Virginia

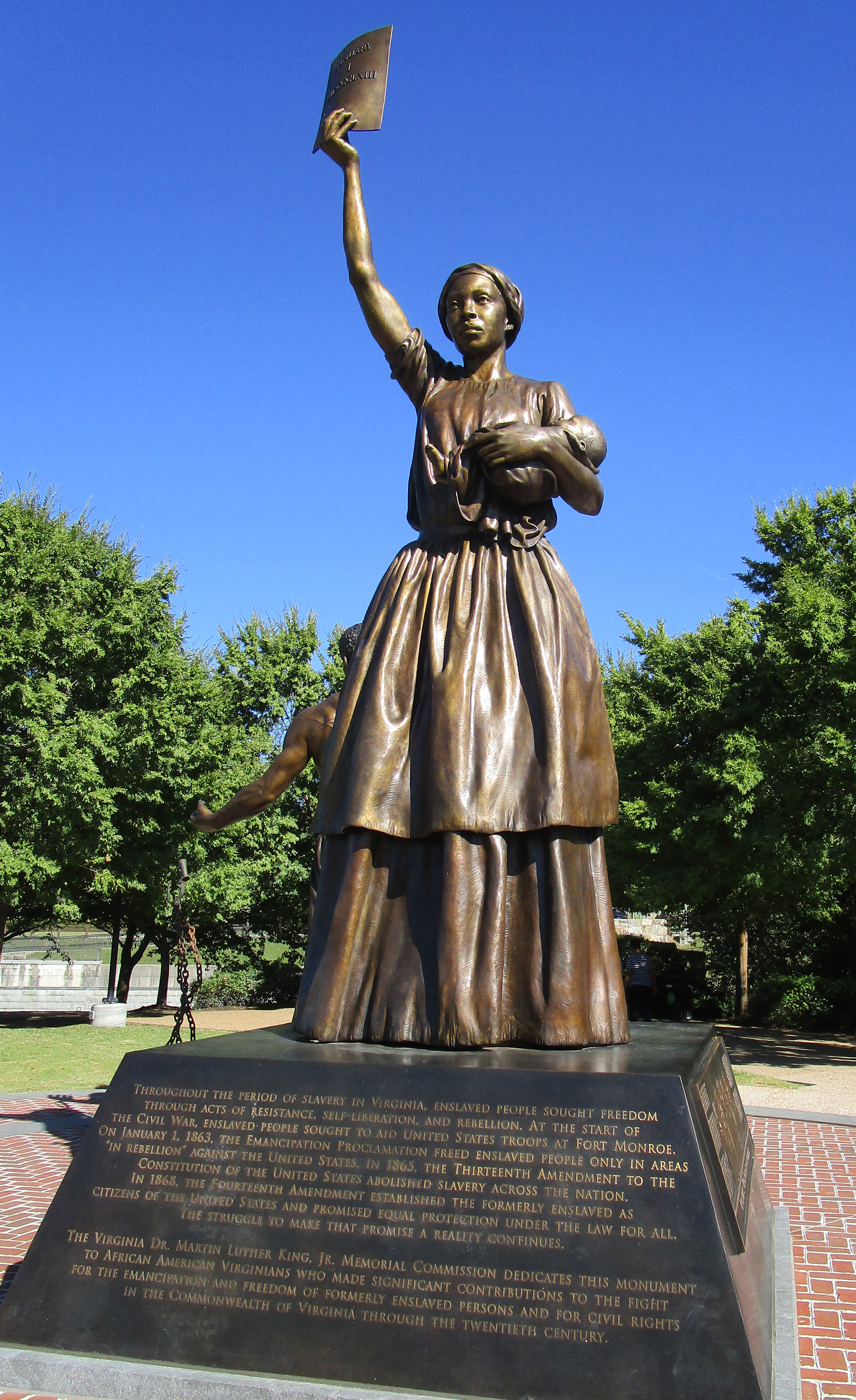

- Location in Virginia Location in United States
- Artist: Thomas Jay Warren
- Completion date: 2021
- Medium: Bronze statues
- Subject: Emancipation
- Dimensions: 12 feet (3.7 m) (height)
- Location: Brown's Island, Richmond, Virginia; 37.5344°N 77.4439°W

The Emancipation and Freedom Monument on Brown's Island, Richmond, Virginia, is a public statue installed on September 22, 2021. The monument includes two 12-foot (3.7 m) bronze statues of an emancipated man and woman with an infant. The woman is holding a piece of paper with the date January 1, 1863 which corresponds with the day U.S. president Abraham Lincoln issued the Emancipation Proclamation.

The monument was designed by Oregon sculptor Thomas Jay Warren. Virginia senator Jennifer McClellan led the commissioning of the statue. According to McClellan, "it's the first state-funded statue celebrating emancipation in the U.S."

== Composition ==
The pedestal features the names, photos, and stories of ten Virginians who participated involved both before and after emancipation.

=== Pre-emancipation ===
- Mary Bowser, former enslaved Union spy during the Civil War
- William Harvey Carney, soldier and formerly enslaved
- Gabriel, enslaved blacksmith and rebellion leader
- Dred Scott, enslaved man and plaintiff of Dred Scott v. Sandford
- Nat Turner, enslaved preacher and rebellion leader

=== Post-emancipation ===
- Rosa Dixon Bowser, educator and women's rights activist
- John Mercer Langston, politician and academic administrator
- John Mitchell Jr., community activist, newspaper editor, and political candidate
- Lucy F. Simms, educator
- Wyatt Tee Walker, civil rights activist and reverend

== Gallery ==
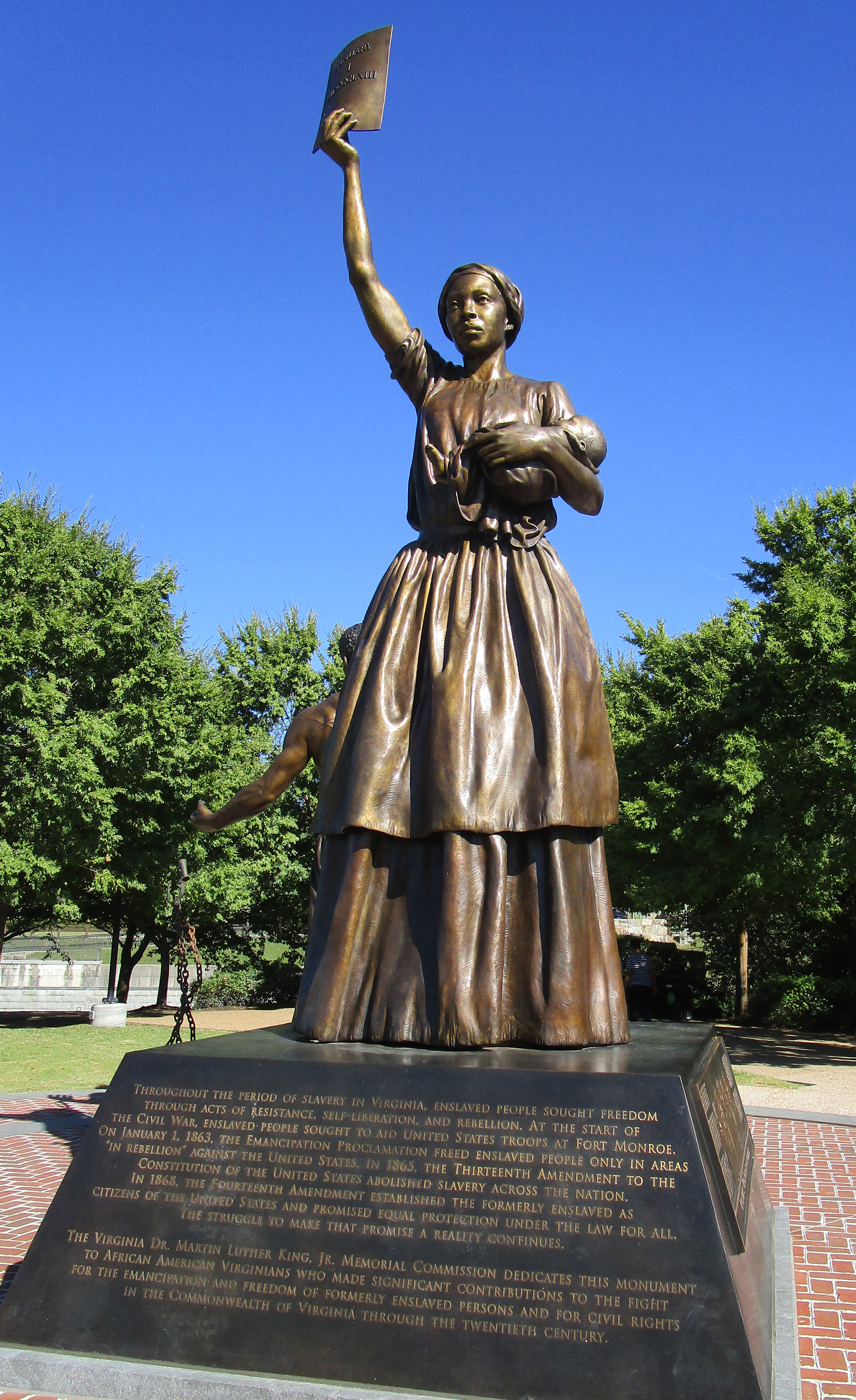
view 1

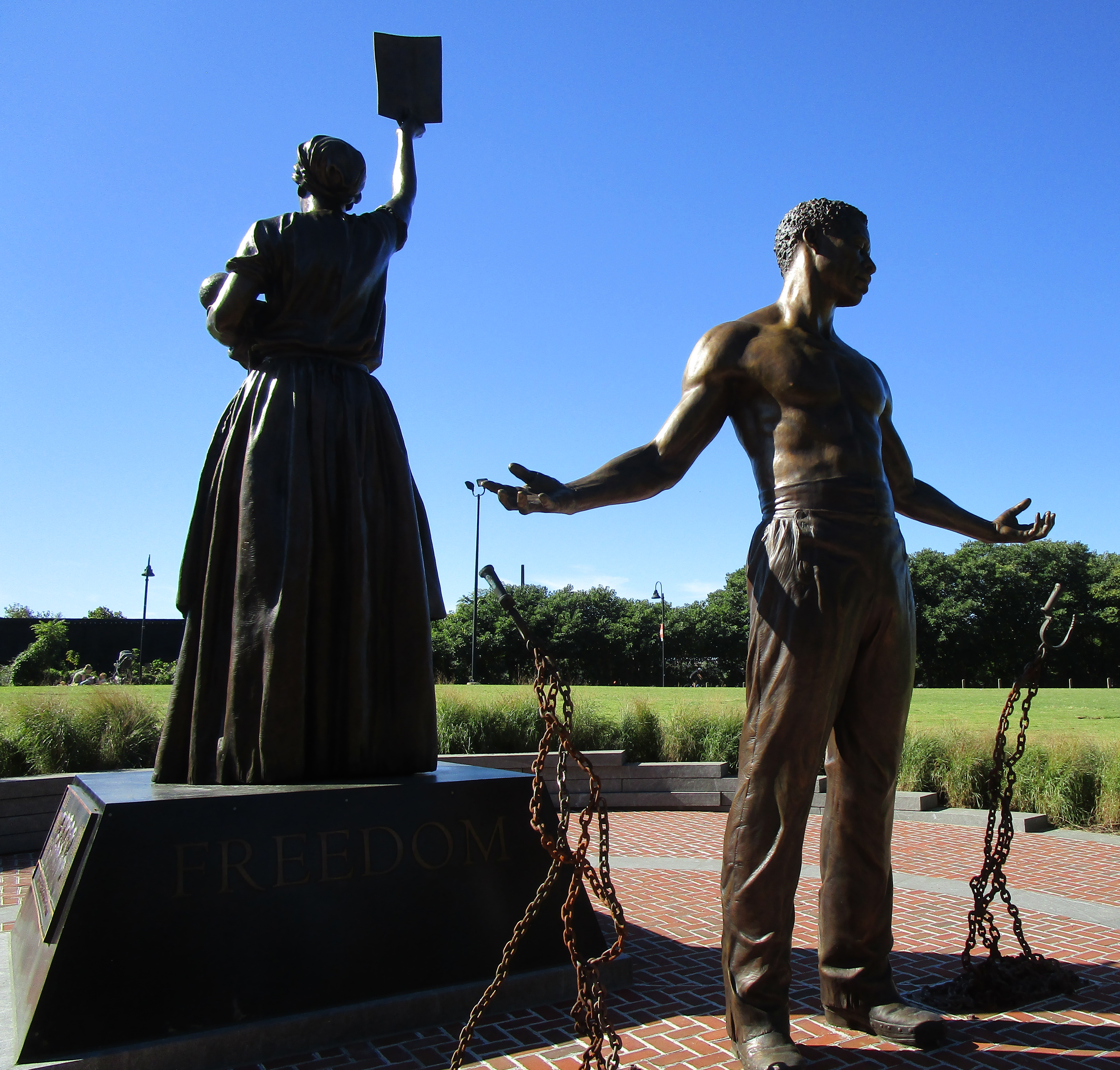
view 2

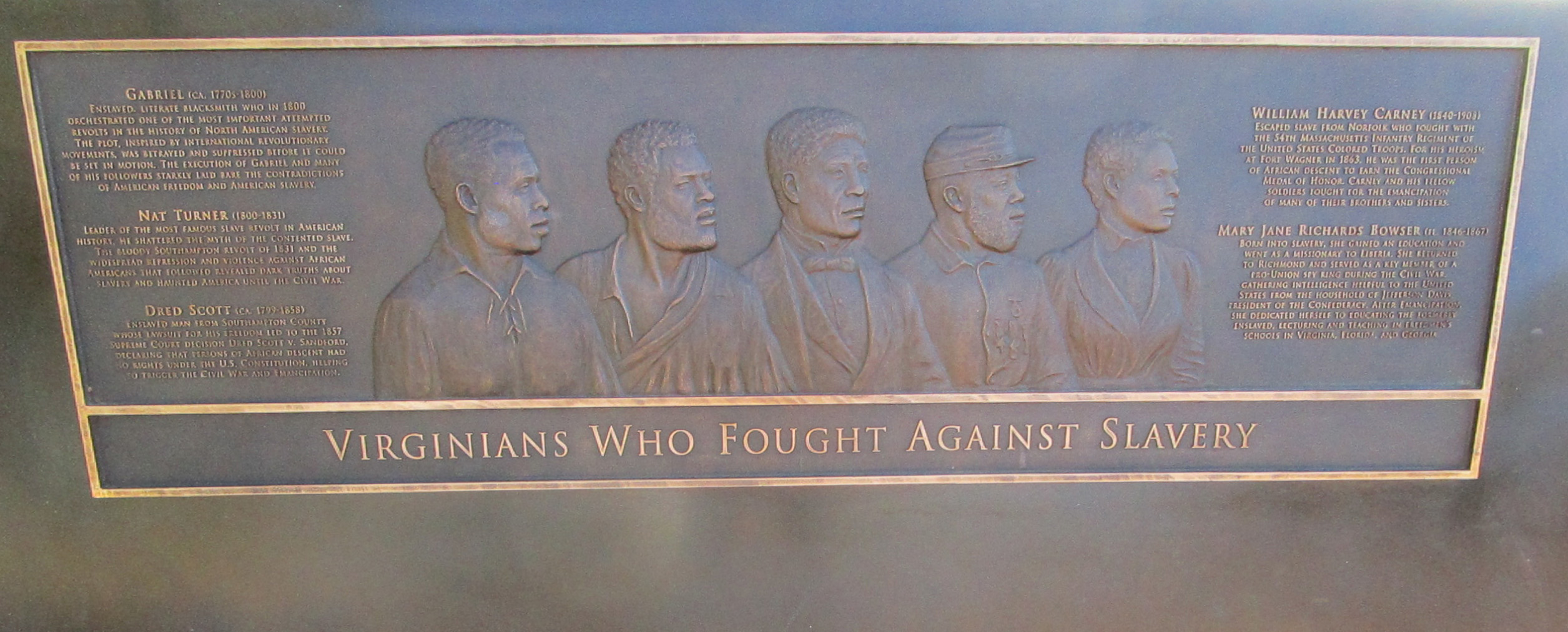
Emancipation and Freedom Monument Pedestal 01

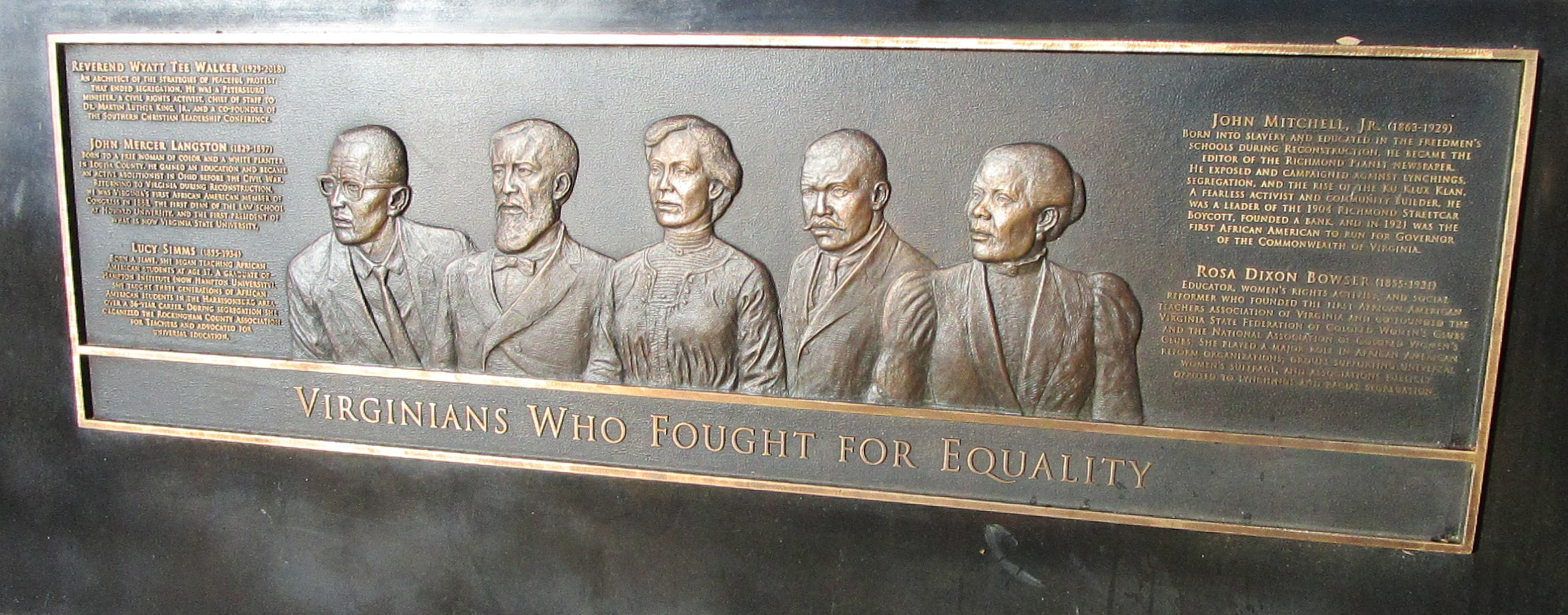
Emancipation and Freedom Monument Pedestal 02

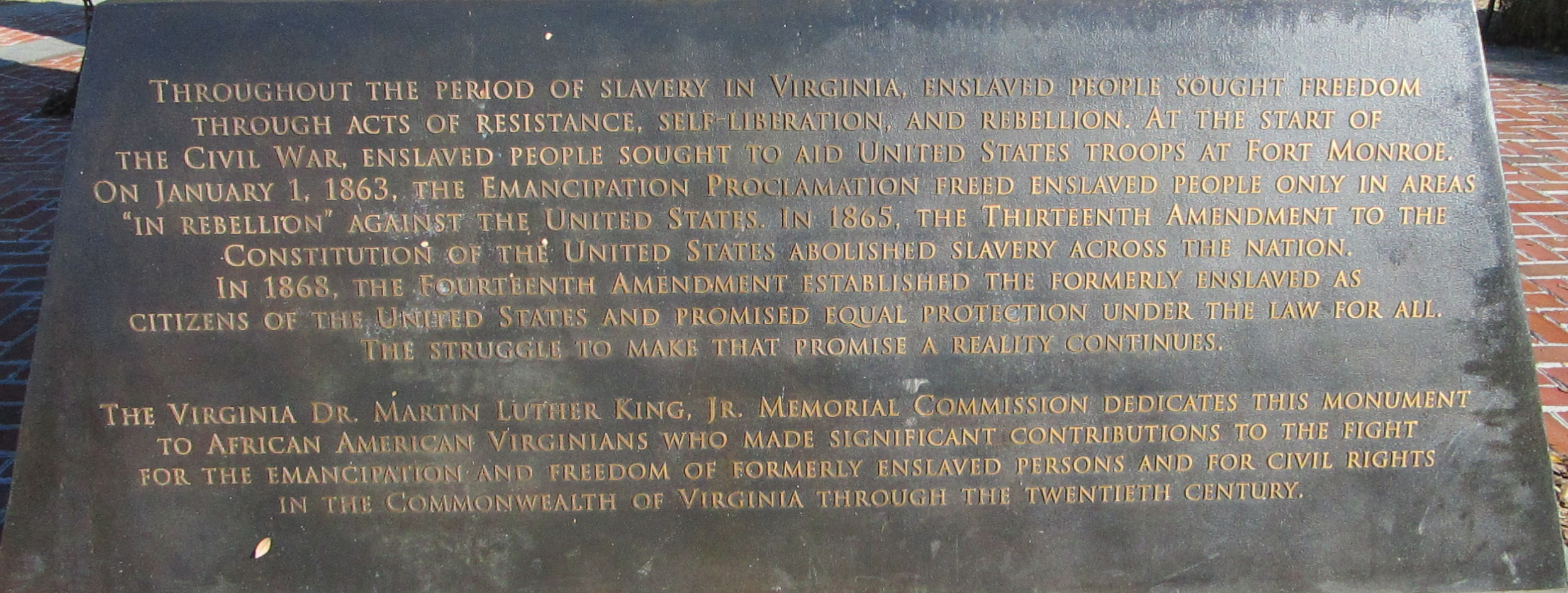
Emancipation and Freedom Monument Pedestal 03

== See also ==
- List of monuments to African Americans
