= Lucy F. Simms School =

Historic school building in Virginia, US

- U.S. National Register of Historic Places
- Virginia Landmarks Register
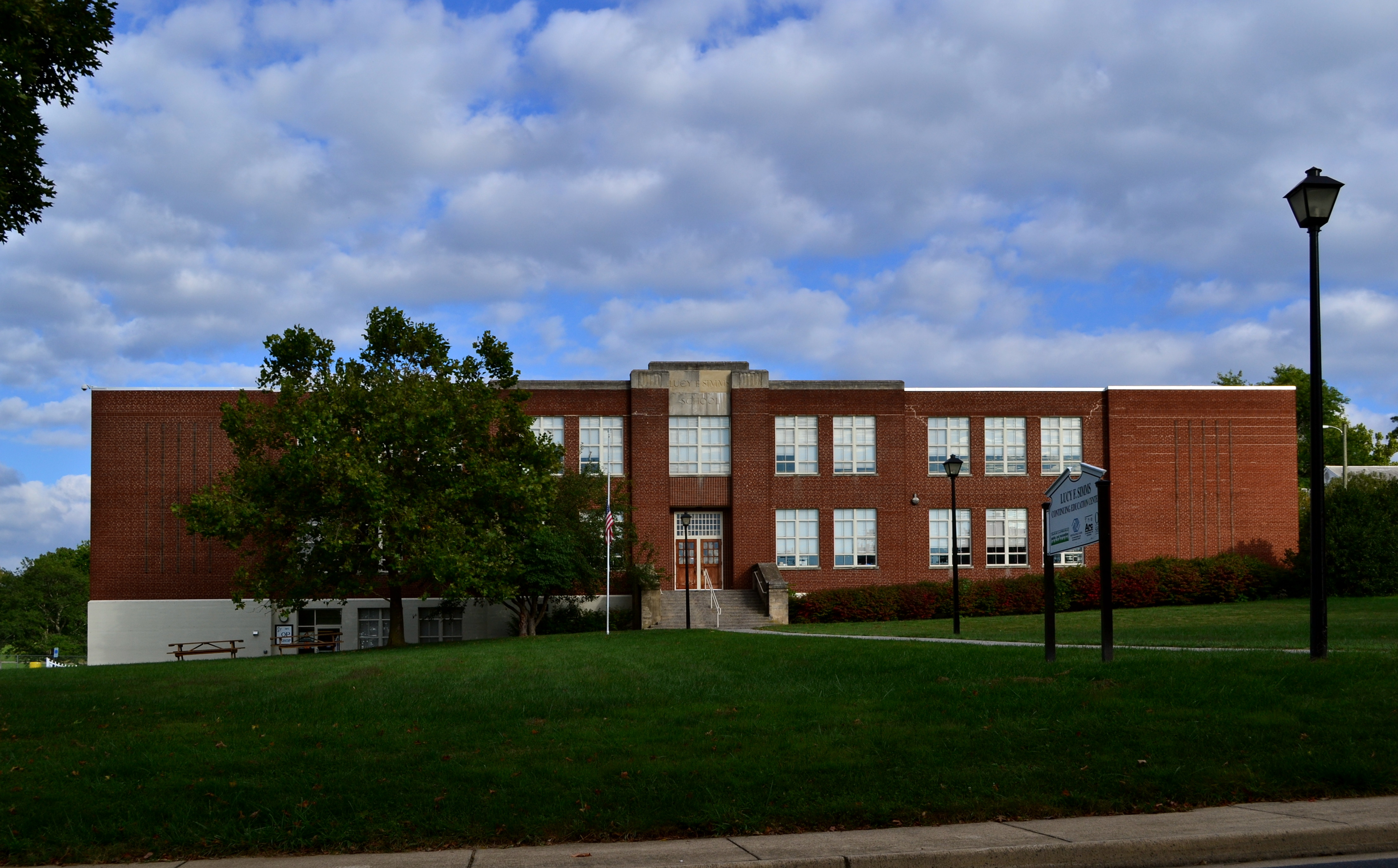
- Lucy F. Simms School in September 2013

- Location within Virginia Location within the United States
- Location: 620 Simms Ave., Harrisonburg, Virginia
- Coordinates: 38°27′16″N 78°51′29″W
- Area: 7 acres (2.8 ha)
- Built: 1939
- Built by: Nielson Construction Company
- Architect: Virginia Department of Education
- NRHP reference No.: 04000040
- VLR No.: 115-5035

Significant dates
- Added to NRHP: February 11, 2004
- Designated VLR: December 3, 2003

The Lucy F. Simms School is a school building at 620 Simms Avenue in Harrisonburg, Virginia. It was listed on the National Register of Historic Places on February 11, 2004. Lucy F. Simms (born 1855, died July 10, 1934) was a former slave who went on to become an influential teacher in Harrisonburg.

The school was located in north-eastern Harrisonburg, on the site of a previous school, the Effinger Street school. It was co-educational but was only available to African American children. The site had housed a school from around 1880 on what had previously been the Hilltop estate of the Gray family. The Lucy F. Simms school was built in 1938 and closed from 1966 when American schools finally became integrated and so open to all children.

After the school's closure, the building remained empty until it was re-opened in 2005 as the Lucy F. Simms Continuing Education Center.
