= Endless Caverns =

Commercial show cave located near New Market, Virginia, United States

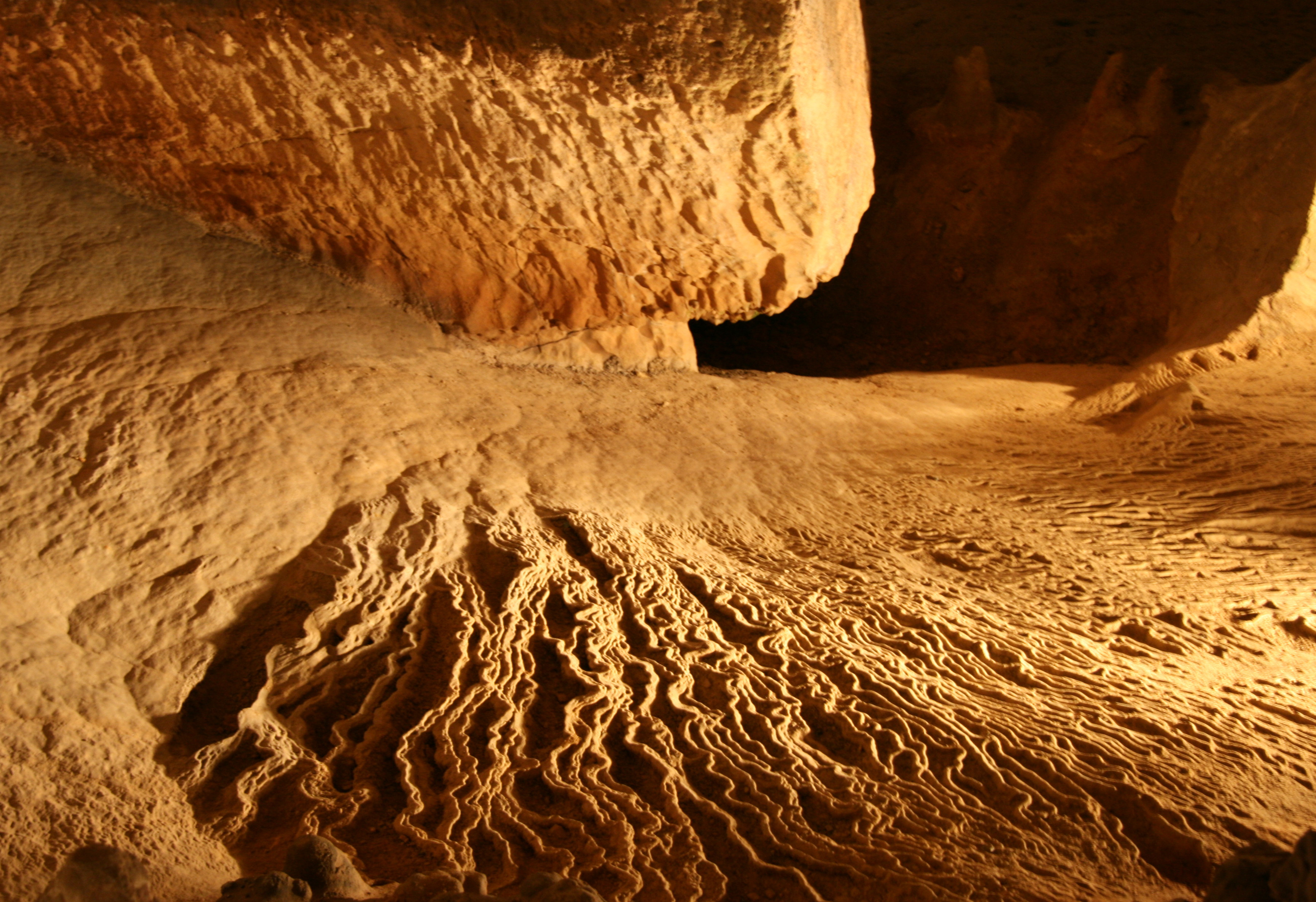
- Rimstone at Endless Caverns

- Location within Shenandoah Valley Location within Virginia Location within the United States
- Type: Natural Area
- Location: New Market, Virginia
- Coordinates: 38.5949°N 78.6756°W
- Created: 1977

Endless Caverns is a commercial show cave located three miles (4.8 km) south of New Market, Virginia, United States. The cavern is located in the pet-friendly, Endless Caverns Resort, featuring RV sites, vacation rental cottages and a number of amenities, including an outdoor pool, playground, hiking trails, catch-and-release fishing pond, mining sluice, and more.

== History ==
According to the tour operators, the cave was discovered by two boys in October 1879, while hunting rabbits on the property of Ruben Zirkle. The boys cornered a rabbit behind an outcropping of limestone rocks and began moving some of the loose stones to flush the rabbit from his hiding place. After doing this they discovered a hole in the ground and ran back to the house to grab some ropes and candles. After going into the hole, the boys found that there were many chambers and rooms. Not long after the discovery, the Zirkles began doing candle lit tours through the cave. In 1919, the cave was bought by Colonel Brown who had the cave fully electrified for the August 1920 grand opening with a lighting design by Phineas Stephens. In 1928 more electric work was done in collaboration with Samuel Hibben and W.A. Oglesby.

== Wildlife ==
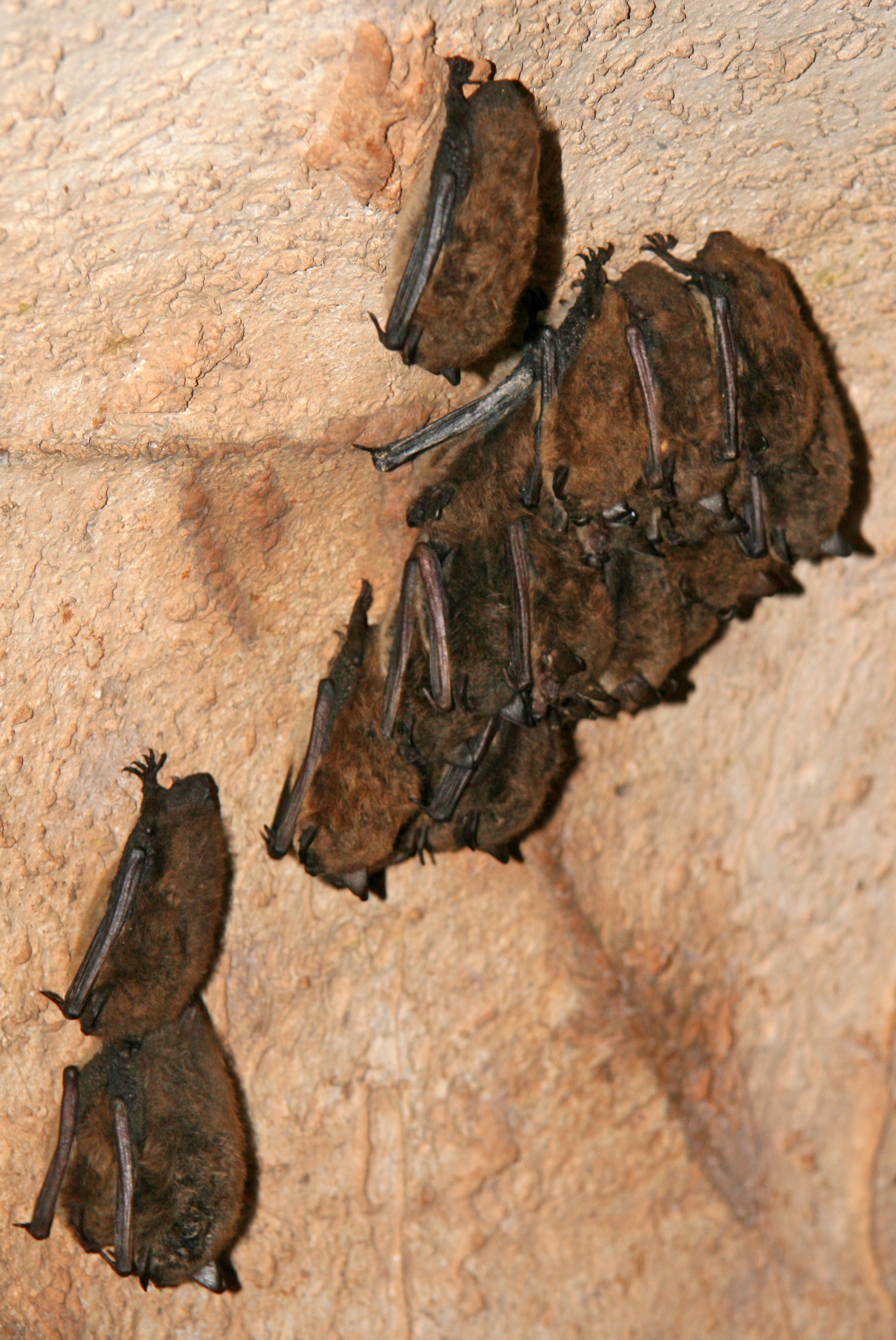
Little brown bats at Endless Caverns

Endless is home to colonies of bats, primarily little brown bats, that are visible on the tour route.

== Extent ==
The present mapped extent of Endless Caverns is 5.5 miles (8.9 km), making it the 20th longest cave in Virginia and the 176th longest in the United States. Its deepest measured point is 160 feet (49 m) below the surface.
