= Longs Chapel =

Historic church in Virginia, United States

- U.S. National Register of Historic Places
- Virginia Landmarks Register
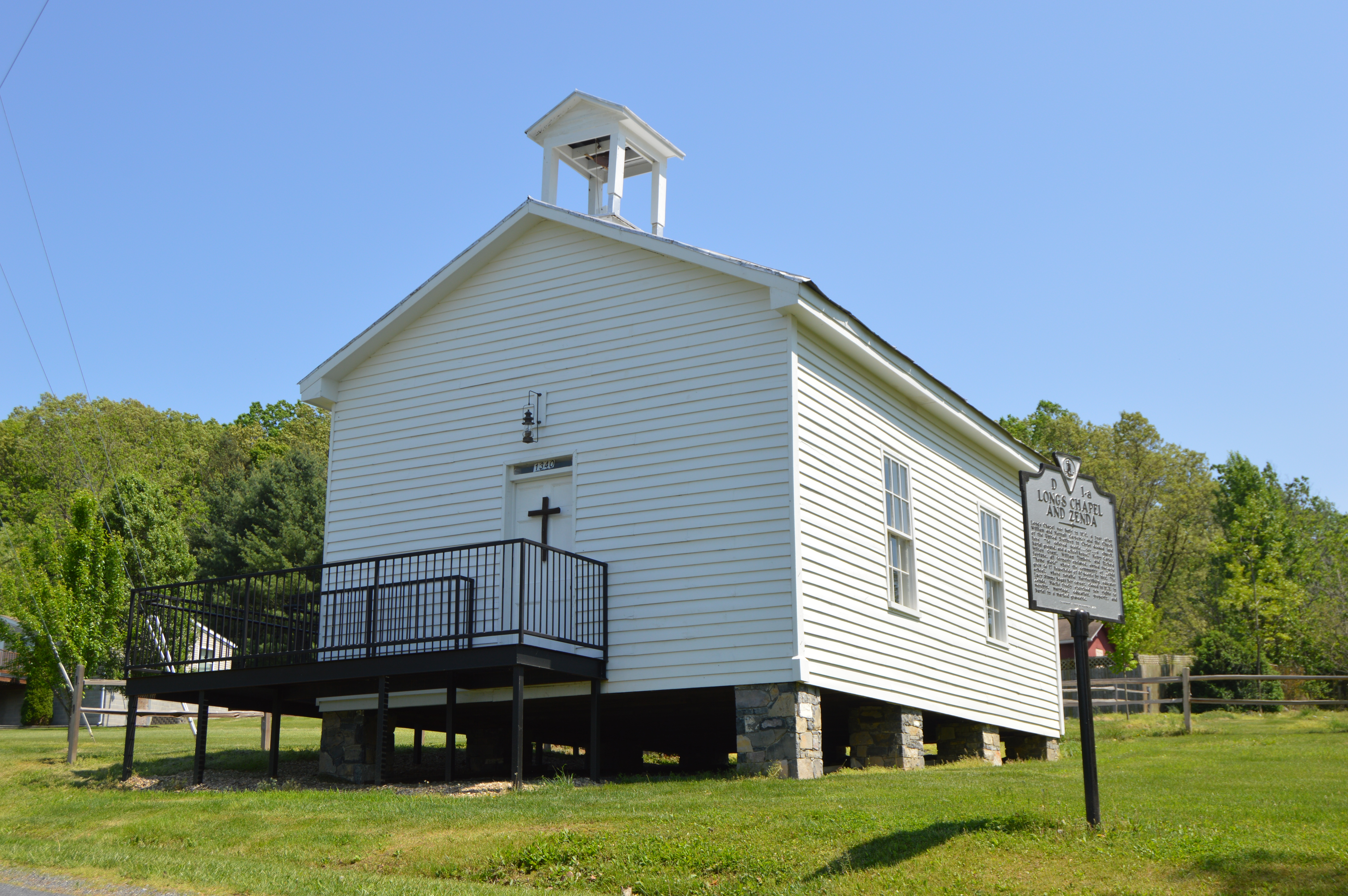
- Front and western side

- Location within Virginia Location within the United States
- Location: 1334B Fridleys Gap Rd., near Harrisonburg, Virginia
- Coordinates: 38°30′45″N 78°45′44″W
- Area: 0.5 acres (0.20 ha)
- Built: 1871
- Built by: Jacob Long, T.J. Orndorff
- NRHP reference No.: 06001042
- VLR No.: 082-5264

Significant dates
- Added to NRHP: November 15, 2006
- Designated VLR: September 6, 2006

Longs Chapel, also known as Old Athens Church and Athens Colored School, is a historic Church of the United Brethren in Christ church and cemetery located at Zenda near Harrisonburg, Rockingham County, Virginia. It was built about 1871, and is a small, one-story, frame structure with a standard gable-fronted nave form with weatherboard siding, metal roofing, stone foundation piers, a small belfry, and an apse added about 1900. It measures approximately 20 feet by 30 feet. The cemetery includes multiple grave depressions, fieldstone tombstones, and a number of professionally carved marble monuments. The church also housed a one-room school for African-American children where Harrisonburg educator Lucy F. Simms had her first teaching post in 1877. The school at Zenda closed in 1925 and the last services at Longs Chapel were held in the late 1920s. The building was subsequently used as a hay barn. The last burial was in 1935.

It was listed on the National Register of Historic Places in 2006.
