= Theodore K. Stubbs =

American politician and lawyer (1847–1911)

Member of the Pennsylvania House of Representatives from the Chester County district
- In office 1880–1886 Serving with John A. Reynolds, John T. Potts, William Wayne, Levi Fetters, Levi B. Kaler
- Preceded by: Samuel Butler, William T. Fulton, Jesse Matlack, John A. Reynolds
- Succeeded by: Lewis H. Evans, William W. McConnell, John W. Hickman, D. Smith Talbot

Personal details
- Born: Theodore Kirk Stubbs; June 10, 1847 East Nottingham Township, Pennsylvania, U.S.
- Died: December 4, 1911 (aged 64) Oxford, Pennsylvania, U.S.
- Party: Republican
- Education: University of Michigan
- Occupation: Politician; lawyer

Theodore Kirk Stubbs (June 10, 1847 – December 4, 1911) was an American politician and lawyer from Pennsylvania. He served as a member of the Pennsylvania House of Representatives, representing Chester County from 1880 to 1886.

== Early life ==
Theodore Kirk Stubbs was born on June 10, 1847, in East Nottingham Township, Pennsylvania, to Rachel A. (née Kirk) and Daniel Stubbs. His father was involved in the mercantile industry and worked in paper and flour mills. Stubbs attended Oxford Academy and Wyer's Military School and later studied at the University of Michigan. He read law under Judge J. Smith Futhey in West Chester and was admitted to the bar in 1875.

== Career ==
Stubbs began his law practice by opening an office in Oxford, Pennsylvania. He was actively involved in the local legal community and served as a borough burgess, a role similar to a mayor, overseeing municipal affairs.

As a member of the Republican Party, Stubbs was elected to the Pennsylvania House of Representatives, representing Chester County from 1880 until 1886. He was president of the Oxford, Cochranville, and Parkesburg Trolley Road.

== Personal life ==
Stubbs died on December 4, 1911, at his home in Oxford.
