= John Edge (disambiguation) =

John Edge was a Chief Justice in India in the British Raj era.

John Edge may also refer to:

- John T. Edge (born 1962), American food writer
- John P. Edge (1822–1904), American politician

== See also ==
- St. John's Edge
