= Elisha W. Baily =

American politician (1821–1904)

Member of the Pennsylvania House of Representatives from the Chester County district
- In office 1873–1876 Serving with Levi Prizer, Peter G. Carey, John P. Edge, George Fairlamb Smith
- Preceded by: Joseph C. Keech and Levi Prizer
- Succeeded by: Samuel Butler, William T. Fulton, Jesse Matlack, John P. Edge

Personal details
- Born: October 17, 1821 Londonderry Township, Chester County, Pennsylvania, U.S.
- Died: December 4, 1904 (aged 83) Sadsbury Township, Lancaster County, Pennsylvania, U.S.
- Resting place: Sadsbury Friends Burial Grounds; Christiana, Pennsylvania, U.S.
- Party: Republican
- Education: Jefferson Medical College (MD)
- Occupation: Politician; physician; educator

Elisha W. Baily (October 17, 1821 – December 4, 1904) was an American politician and physician from Pennsylvania. He served as a member of the Pennsylvania House of Representatives, representing Chester County from 1873 to 1876.

== Early life ==
Elisha W. Baily was born on October 17, 1821, in Londonderry Township, Chester County, Pennsylvania. His father died when Baily was two years old. He graduated from Union Academy. He then taught at Andrews' Bridge for two years. He graduated from Jefferson Medical College with a Doctor of Medicine in 1844.

== Career ==
After graduating, Baily practiced medicine in Parkesburg. After about a year, he moved to Atglen. He practiced in Chester County and eastern Lancaster County. In 1857, he moved to New Bloomfield, Pennsylvania, and practiced there until the start of the Civil War.

Baily was surgeon of the 47th Pennsylvania Infantry Regiment from 1861 to 1863. He started as an examiner of recruits in Camp Curtin. He was health officer of the port under General Daniel Phineas Woodbury's command and worked at the general hospital in Key West, Florida, in 1862. In 1862, he was medical director and worked on General Brannon's staff. He returned to General Woodbury's command and served in Florida again from 1863 to 1864. He then served on a hospital boat on the Mississippi River. He was surgeon under General Philip Sheridan of the Army of the Shenandoah in 1864. He was present at the Third Battle of Winchester and the Battle of Cedar Creek. After the Battle of Cedar Creek, his commission ended.

After the war, he moved back to Atglen and continued his medical practice. He retired in 1882. He lived in Philadelphia for ten years and moved to a farm in Sadsbury Township, Lancaster County, Pennsylvania, in 1892.

Baily was a Republican. He served as a member of the Pennsylvania House of Representatives, representing Chester County from 1873 to 1876.

== Personal life ==
Baily married. He died on December 4, 1904, in Sadsbury Township. He was interred at Sadsbury Friends Burial Grounds in Christiana.
