= Levi B. Kaler =

American politician and businessman (1828–1906)

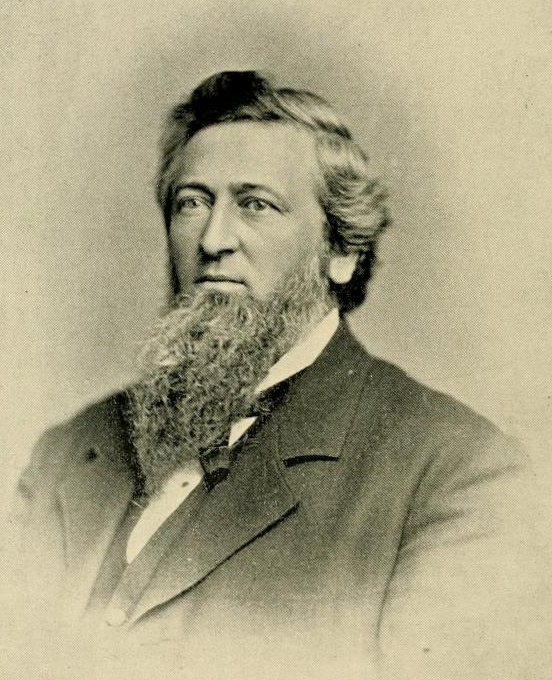
- Kaler in a 1893 publication

Member of the Pennsylvania House of Representatives from the Chester County district
- In office 1885–1886 Serving with Theodore K. Stubbs, William Wayne, Levi Fetters
- Preceded by: John T. Potts, Theodore K. Stubbs, William Wayne, Levi Fetters
- Succeeded by: Lewis H. Evans, William W. McConnell, John W. Hickman, D. Smith Talbot

Personal details
- Born: January 26, 1828 Robeson Township, Pennsylvania, U.S.
- Died: September 1, 1906 (aged 78) Phoenixville, Pennsylvania, U.S.
- Resting place: Morris Cemetery; Phoenixville, Pennsylvania, U.S.
- Party: Republican
- Spouse(s): Anne Oliver Nyce (m. 1860; died 1869) Anne S. White (m. 1874)
- Children: 4
- Occupation: Politician; businessman

Levi B. Kaler (January 26, 1828 – September 1, 1906) was an American politician and businessman from Pennsylvania. He served as a member of the Pennsylvania House of Representatives, representing Chester County from 1885 to 1886.

== Early life ==
Levi B. Kaler was born on January 26, 1828, in Robeson Township, Pennsylvania, to Elizabeth (née Umstead) and John Kaler. His father was a farmer and officer of the St. Mary's Protestant Episcopal Church. His grandfather Matthias Kaler was a German immigrant who served in the Revolutionary War and was a justice of the peace in Berks County. He grew up in Berks County and worked on his father's farm. He was educated in common schools and was instructed privately by Reverend Henry Miller.

== Career ==
At the age of 19, Kaler became a salesman with William Nyce, a dry goods and grocery dealer in Phoenixville. After seven years, Nyce retired and Kaler and another clerk Kevin Wagoner bought the store and renamed it Kaler & Wagoner. Their business was the first to use gas for lighting in Phoenixville. He was a school board member in Phoenixville from 1856 to 1862. In 1866, he was elected to the board of managers and served as secretary of the Morris Cemetery in Phoenixville. He was involved in the construction of the Masonic Hall in Phoenixville and was president of its board of managers.

Kaler served on Phoenixville council from 1872 to 1873. While on the council, he helped push for the erection of the water works in Phoenixville. He was chief burgess in Phoenixville in 1874. He was a Whig and after its dissolution became a Republican. He served as a Republican in the Pennsylvania House of Representatives, representing Chester County from 1885 to 1886.

Kaler was director of the Phoenixville National Bank and later became president of the bank. He was director of the Pickering Valley Railroad Company for at least 12 years and was director of the Fidelity Mutual Life Association of Philadelphia. He was president of the Phoenix Creamery Association. He was deacon of the First Baptist Church in Phoenixville and served as its treasurer for a number of years. He was superintendent of the church's Sunday school for more than 50 years. For more than 20 years, he was clerk and treasurer of the Central Union Association of Baptist Churches. He was a member of the Wire Picket Fence Company of Phoenixville. In 1883, he started purchasing real estate in Florida. As of 1893, he owned 22.5 acres (9.1 ha) of orange groves in Florida.

== Personal life ==
Kaler married Anne Oliver Nyce on September 17, 1860. They had four children, including Annie E. N. Nyce. His wife died in 1869. He married Anne S. White, daughter of Samuel White, of Phoenixville on July 16, 1874.

Kaler died of heart disease on September 1, 1906, in Phoenixville. He was interred at Morris Cemetery in Phoenixville.
