= D. Smith Talbot =

American politician (1841–1915)

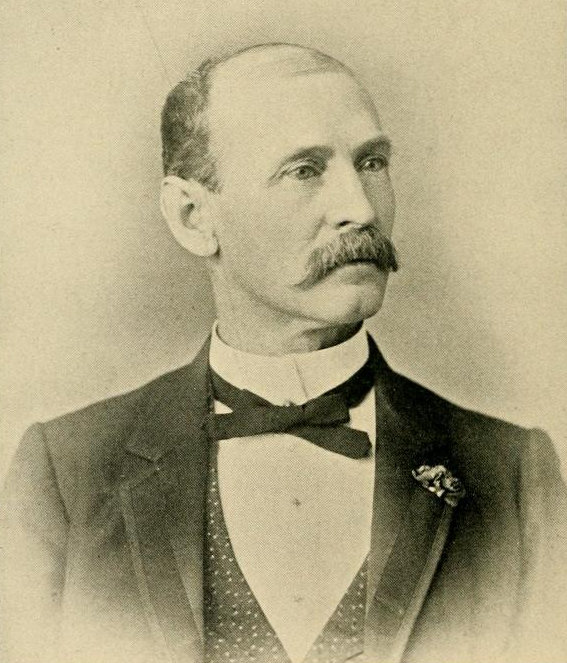
- Talbot in a 1893 publication

Member of the Pennsylvania House of Representatives from the Chester County district
- In office 1889–1896 Serving with William Evans, Lewis H. Evans, William W. McConnell, John W. Hickman, David H. Branson, William Preston Snyder, Joseph G. West, John H. Marshall, Thomas J. Philips, Daniel Foulke Moore
- Preceded by: Theodore K. Stubbs, William Wayne, Levi Fetters, Levi B. Kaler
- Succeeded by: J. H. Marshall, Thomas J. Philips, Daniel Foulke Moore, Plummer E. Jefferis

Personal details
- Born: David Smith Talbot; November 19, 1841 Honey Brook, Pennsylvania, U.S.
- Died: March 5, 1915 (aged 73) Norristown, Pennsylvania, U.S.
- Resting place: Saint Mark's Episcopal Church Cemetery; Honey Brook, Pennsylvania, U.S.
- Party: Republican
- Spouse: Rebecca Wills (m. 1876)
- Occupation: Politician; lawyer; educator

David Smith Talbot (November 19, 1841 – March 5, 1915) was an American politician and lawyer from Pennsylvania. He served as a member of the Pennsylvania House of Representatives, representing Chester County from 1889 to 1896.

== Early life and education ==
David Smith Talbot was born on November 19, 1841, in Honey Brook, Pennsylvania, to Elizabeth (née Buchanan) and Caleb P. Talbot. His father served in the War of 1812 and held township political offices. Talbot grew up on the farm. He was educated in public schools, Morgantown Academy, Waynesburg Academy and Parkesburg Academy. Later in life, Talbot read law in West Chester and was admitted to the bar in Chester County on April 16, 1870. He was also admitted to the bar in Delaware, Mifflin, Schuylkill and Philadelphia counties in Pennsylvania.

== Career ==
Talbot worked as a teacher and taught in public schools for eight years.

In August 1862, Talbot enlisted in Company C of the 42nd Pennsylvania Infantry Regiment. He served as a private until he was honorably discharged in Harrisburg. After serving, Talbot worked as a lawyer in West Chester and adjoining counties from 1870 to 1915. In 1883, he became counsel of the Delaware River and Lancaster Railroad.

Talbot was a Republican. In 1885, he was elected a senatorial delegate at the state convention. In 1887, he was elected borough solicitor of West Chester. He was elected as a member of the Pennsylvania House of Representatives. He represented Chester County in that body for four terms, from 1889 to 1896. In 1891, he was nominated to replace state senator Abram D. Harlan after his resignation, but lost the election. In the sessions of 1891 and 1893, he served as chairman of the committee on elections. In 1900, he was census supervisor of the second census district of Pennsylvania.

== Personal life ==
Talbot married Rebecca Wills, daughter of Dr. Andrew Wills, of West Chester on May 25, 1876. They had no children. He was a member of the Holy Trinity Protestant Episcopal Church of West Chester and was superintendent of the Sabbath School for 10 years.

Around 1904, Talbot moved to a sanatorium. He died on March 5, 1915, at a hospital in Norristown. He was interred at Saint Mark's Episcopal Church Cemetery in Honey Brook.
