= William T. Fulton =

American politician and lawyer (1835–1912)

Member of the Pennsylvania House of Representatives from the Chester County district
- In office 1877–1880 Serving with Samuel Butler, Jesse Matlack, John P. Edge, John A. Reynolds
- Preceded by: Elisha W. Baily, Peter G. Carey, George Fairlamb Smith, John P. Edge
- Succeeded by: John A. Reynolds, Theodore K. Stubbs, John T. Potts, William Wayne

Personal details
- Born: February 27, 1835 West Nottingham Township, Pennsylvania, U.S.
- Died: November 9, 1912 (aged 77) Oxford, Pennsylvania, U.S.
- Resting place: Oxford Cemetery
- Party: Republican
- Spouse(s): Hannah A. Kirk (m. 1865, died) Annie E. Neeper (m. 1875, died)
- Children: 3
- Occupation: Politician; farmer; lawyer

William T. Fulton (February 27, 1835 – November 9, 1912) was an American politician and lawyer from Pennsylvania. He served as a member of the Pennsylvania House of Representatives, representing Chester County from 1877 to 1880.

== Early life ==
William T. Fulton was born on February 27, 1835, in West Nottingham Township, Pennsylvania, to Nancy A. (née Ramsey) and James J. Fulton. He attended Jordan Bank Academy. He read law with Thaddeus Stevens and J. Smith Futhey. He was admitted to the bar on May 13, 1861.

== Career ==
In August and September 1861, Fulton helped form Company E of the Purnell Legion of the Maryland Infantry in the Civil War. He was also affiliated with Companies F and G of the Purnell Legion, commanded by William Henry Purnell. He was promoted to captain and later major of the regiment due to his gallantry at Battle of Harpers Ferry and Battle of Antietam. In 1863, he became ill and was honorably discharged. He volunteered again and became first lieutenant of Company A of the 29th Pennsylvania Infantry Regiment in 1863. He was a farmer and blacksmith. He practiced law in Oxford from 1861 to 1912.

Fulton served as a justice of the peace of Oxford from 1863 to 1876. He was a Republican. He served as a member of the Pennsylvania House of Representatives, representing Chester County from 1877 to 1880.

Fulton was director of the Oxford National Bank.

== Personal life ==
In 1865, Fulton married Hannah A. Kirk, daughter of Joseph Kirk of West Nottingham Township. They had a son and daughter, Kirk and Annie E. His wife predeceased him. He married Annie E. Neeper in 1875. They had one daughter, Eleanor J. She predeceased him. He was a member and elder of the Oxford Presbyterian Church.

Fulton died of heart failure on November 9, 1912, at his home office in Oxford. He was interred at Oxford Cemetery.
