= William Wayne (1828–1901) =

American politician (1828–1901)

Member of the Pennsylvania House of Representatives from the Chester County district
- In office 1881–1886 Serving with John A. Reynolds, Theodore K. Stubbs, John T. Potts, Levi Fetters, Levi B. Kaler
- Preceded by: Samuel Butler, William T. Fulton, Jesse Matlack, John A. Reynolds
- Succeeded by: Lewis H. Evans, William W. McConnell, John W. Hickman, D. Smith Talbot

Personal details
- Born: William Wayne Evans; December 6, 1828 Easttown Township, Pennsylvania, U.S.
- Died: November 20, 1901 (aged 72) Paoli, Pennsylvania, U.S.
- Resting place: Old Saint David Church Cemetery; Wayne, Pennsylvania, U.S.
- Party: Republican
- Spouse: Hannah J. Zook
- Children: 2, including William
- Relatives: Anthony Wayne (great-grandfather); Isaac Wayne (great-great-grandfather)
- Education: University of Pennsylvania
- Occupation: Politician; farmer

William Wayne Evans (December 6, 1828 – November 20, 1901), better known as William Wayne, was an American politician from Pennsylvania. He served as a member of the Pennsylvania House of Representatives, representing Chester County from 1881 to 1886.

== Early life ==
William Wayne Evans was born on December 6, 1828, in Easttown Township, Pennsylvania, to Mary Wayne (née Atlee) and Isaacher Evans. His great-grandfather was Revolutionary War soldier Anthony Wayne and his great-great-grandfather was Isaac Wayne. He studied at schools in Philadelphia and graduated from the University of Pennsylvania in 1846. In 1854, an act of Congress allowed Evans to change his name to William Wayne.

== Career ==
Wayne served as a captain of Company K of the 97th Pennsylvania Infantry Regiment during the American Civil War. He served from 1861 to 1863. He was brevetted major and lieutenant colonel and declined admission in the Regular Army. He was a farmer.

Wayne was a Republican. He served as a member of the Pennsylvania House of Representatives, representing Chester County from 1881 to 1886.

Wayne was the 10th president-general of the Society of the Cincinnati and president of the Pennsylvania society of the organization. He was president of Sons of the Revolution.

== Personal life ==
Wayne married Hannah J. Zook, daughter of David Zook, of Montgomery County. They had two children, William and Mary Atlee. He was a member of the Protestant Episcopal Church.

Wayne died on November 20, 1901, at Waynesborough in Paoli. He was interred at Old Saint David Church Cemetery in Wayne.
