= Jesse Matlack =

American politician (1821–1893)

Member of the Pennsylvania House of Representatives from the Chester County district
- In office 1877–1880 Serving with Samuel Butler, William T. Fulton, John P. Edge, John A. Reynolds
- Preceded by: Elisha W. Baily, Peter G. Carey, John P. Edge, George Fairlamb Smith
- Succeeded by: John A. Reynolds, Theodore K. Stubbs, John T. Potts, William Wayne

Personal details
- Born: April 21, 1821 Milltown, East Goshen Township, Pennsylvania, U.S.
- Died: April 5, 1893 (aged 71) East Goshen Township, Pennsylvania, U.S.
- Resting place: Goshen Friends Burial Ground
- Party: Republican
- Spouses: Phoebe Bishop (m. 1854; died 1861) Martha A. Steele (m. 1866)
- Children: 6
- Occupation: Politician; hotelier; farmer

Jesse Matlack (April 21, 1821 – April 5, 1893) was an American politician from Pennsylvania. He served as a member of the Pennsylvania House of Representatives, representing Chester County from 1877 to 1880.

== Early life ==
Jesse Matlack was born on April 21, 1821, in Milltown, East Goshen Township, Pennsylvania, to Phoebe (née Hoopes) and Isaiah Matlack. He studied at common schools and Hoopes' Boarding School in West Chester.

== Career ==
After his father's death in 1830, Matlack received the 234 acres (95 ha) family farm and a hotel in Milltown called "Sheaf of Wheat" (later the Milltown Hotel). He served as tax collector, assessor, auditor, school director and justice of the peace of East Goshen Township for three terms. In 1849, he was appointed postmaster of Milltown.

Matlack was a Republican. He served as a member of the Pennsylvania House of Representatives, representing Chester County from 1877 to 1880.

== Personal life ==
Matlack married Phoebe Bishop, of Delaware County on March 4, 1854. They had four children, Rebecca, Phoebe, Anna and Mary. His wife died in 1861. He married Martha A. Steele, daughter of Peter Steele, on June 16, 1866. They had two children, Joseph E. and Emma W. He was a deacon, trustee, clerk and Sunday school superintendent of Goshen Baptist Church.

Matlack died on April 5, 1893, in East Goshen Township. He was buried at Goshen Friends Burial Ground.
