= William Evans (Pennsylvania politician) =

American politician (1831–1905)

Member of the Pennsylvania House of Representatives from the Chester County district
- In office 1887–1888
- Preceded by: William W. McConnell, John Hickman, D. Smith Talbot, Lewis H. Evans
- Succeeded by: William W. McConnell, John W. Hickman, D. Smith Talbot, Lewis H. Evans

Personal details
- Born: January 31, 1831 Willistown Township, Pennsylvania, U.S.
- Died: April 19, 1905 (aged 74) Malvern, Pennsylvania, U.S.
- Resting place: Willistown Township, Pennsylvania, U.S.
- Party: Democratic
- Spouse: Lydia Thomas (m. 1867)
- Children: 3
- Occupation: Politician; farmer; bank president

William Evans (January 31, 1831 – April 19, 1905) was an American politician from Pennsylvania. He served as a member of the Pennsylvania House of Representatives, representing Chester County from 1887 to 1888.

== Early life ==
William Evans was born on January 31, 1831, on a farm in Willistown Township, Pennsylvania, to Anna M. (née Tucker) and Joshua Evans. His father was a farmer. Evans grew up on the farm and studied at public schools and Gause's Academy.

== Career ==
Evans worked as a farmer. He was director of the Mutual Security Fire Insurance Company of Chester County. He was a member and president of the Farmer's Market Company of Philadelphia. He was founder and vice president of Malvern National Bank. At the time of his death, he was president of Malvern National Bank.

Evans was a Democrat. He served as a member and secretary of the Willistown Township school board for 12 years. He also served as township auditor for six years. He was president and organizer of Newton Square Railroad. Evans was elected to Pennsylvania House of Representatives in 1886. He was the first Democrat elected to that role in 40 years. He represented Chester County in that body from 1887 to 1888.

== Personal life ==
Evans married Lydia Thomas, daughter of Isaac Thomas of Delaware County on February 14, 1867. They had one son and two daughters, William, Anna and Aida T. He lived in Malvern.

Evans died on April 19, 1905, in Malvern. He was buried in Willistown.
