= Peter G. Carey =

American politician (1828–1897)

Member of the Pennsylvania House of Representatives from the Chester County district
- In office 1874–1876 Serving with Elisha W. Baily, John P. Edge, George Fairlamb Smith
- Preceded by: Levi Prizer and Elisha W. Baily
- Succeeded by: Samuel Butler, William T. Fulton, Jesse Matlack, John P. Edge

Personal details
- Born: Peter Gruver Carey; November 11, 1828 Coventry Township, Chester County, Pennsylvania, U.S.
- Died: June 4, 1897 (aged 68) Phoenixville, Pennsylvania, U.S.
- Resting place: Morris Cemetery; Phoenixville, Pennsylvania, U.S.
- Party: Republican
- Occupation: Politician; businessman; bank president

Peter Gruver Carey (November 11, 1828 – June 4, 1897) was an American politician from Pennsylvania. He served as a member of the Pennsylvania House of Representatives, representing Chester County from 1874 to 1876.

== Early life ==
Peter Gruver Carey was born on November 11, 1828, in Coventry Township, Chester County, Pennsylvania. He grew up on a farm.

== Career ==
As a young man, Carey moved to Phoenixville and worked as a clerk. He was a businessman and served 25 years as justice of the peace of Phoenixville. He was elected burginess in Phoenixville.

Carey was a Republican. He served as a member of the Pennsylvania House of Representatives, representing Chester County from 1874 to 1876. He was elected to the council of Phoenixville. He resigned as president of the council in 1897.

Carey was director of the Chester County Mutual Fire Insurance Company for 25 years. He was also director of the Guarantee Trust and Safe Deposit Company of Chester County. He was president of the National Bank of Phoenixville from 1890 to his death.

== Personal life ==
Carey lived on West Church Street in Phoenixville. He died on June 4, 1897, at his home in Phoenixville. He was interred at Morris Cemetery in Phoenixville.
