= Levi Fetters =

American politician (1831–1893)

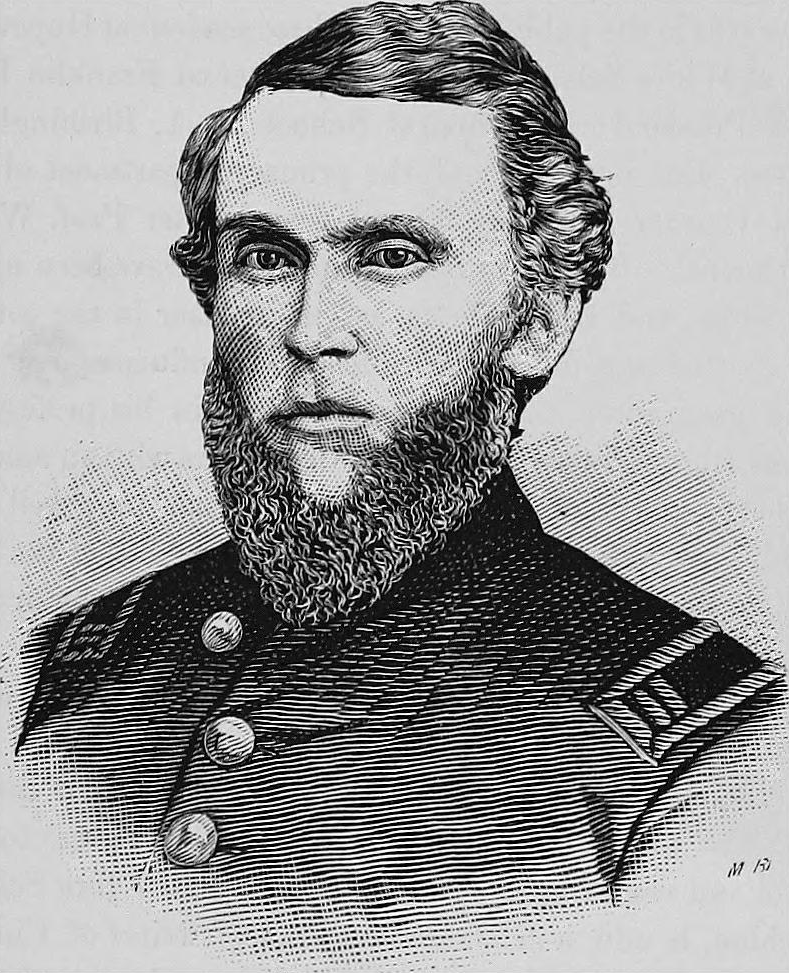
- Drawing of Fetters in an 1881 publication

Member of the Pennsylvania House of Representatives from the Chester County district
- In office 1883–1886 Serving with John T. Potts, Theodore K. Stubbs, William Wayne, Levi B. Kaler
- Preceded by: John A. Reynolds, Theodore K. Stubbs, John T. Potts, William Wayne
- Succeeded by: Lewis H. Evans, William W. McConnell, John W. Hickman, D. Smith Talbot

Personal details
- Born: November 3, 1831 East Whiteland Township, Pennsylvania, U.S.
- Died: August 1893 (aged 61) West Chester, Pennsylvania, U.S.
- Resting place: Fairview Presbyterian Church Cemetery; Glenmoore, Pennsylvania, U.S.
- Party: Republican
- Spouse: Mary King (m. 1869)
- Occupation: Politician; educator; merchant; farmer
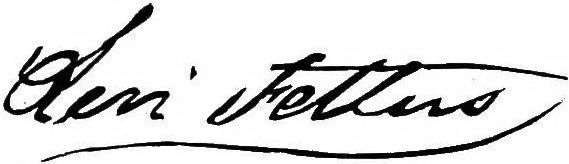
- Signature

Levi Fetters (November 3, 1831 – August 1893) was an American politician from Pennsylvania. He served as a member of the Pennsylvania House of Representatives, representing Chester County from 1883 to 1886.

Fetters was the son of a commissioned officer, and the grandson of a war veteran of the American Revolutionary War. He worked as a teacher during the 1850s, but he left his teaching position for military service in the American Civil War. He served as the captain of a company in the 175th Pennsylvania Infantry Regiment, and as a professor in a Philadelphia-based military school for the United States Colored Troops. Following the war's end, he variously worked as a teacher, a merchant, an employee and representative for a railroad company and an insurance company, and as a bank director. He committed suicide by hanging on August 24 or 25, 1893, at his home in West Chester.

== Early life ==
Levi Fetters was born on November 3, 1831, in East Whiteland Township, Pennsylvania, to Elizabeth (née Acker) and Abraham Fetters. His father was a commissioned officer under John G. Wersler's company. His grandfather George Fetters served in the American Revolutionary War. Fetters attended two years of schooling at Miss Elizabeth Jones's school and two winters of schooling at Howard Academy in Rockville, Chester County.

From 1854 to the outbreak of the American Civil War, Fetters taught school in the winters. In 1859, he traveled to Europe for six months and wrote for the Chester County Times.

== Career ==
In 1862, Fetters served as first lieutenant of the 21st Pennsylvania Infantry Regiment. From 1862 to 1863, he was captain of Company C of the 175th Pennsylvania Infantry Regiment. He served in North Carolina and Virginia. In 1863, he was professor of infantry tactics and army regulations for the United States Colored Troops at the Free Military School at 1210 Chestnut Street in Philadelphia. In 1866, he moved to Florida to work in the cotton business.

Fetters worked as a farmer and teacher. He lived in Barneston, West Nantmeal Township, Pennsylvania, and worked as a ticket and freight agent of the Pennsylvania Railroad. He was an agent for the Adams Express Company. In 1872, he engaged in Barneston in a mercantile business. He was a dry goods and grocery merchant. He was director of the Phoenixville Fire Insurance Company and a school director. In 1872, he became postmaster of West Nantmeal Township.

Fetters was a Republican. He served as a member of the Pennsylvania House of Representatives, representing Chester County from 1883 to 1886.

Fetters was director of the Phoenixville National Bank. He owned six farms in Upper Uwchlan Township.

== Personal life ==
In 1869, Fetters married Mary King, daughter of Isaac King, of East Whiteland.

Fetters died by suicide by hanging on August 24 or 25, 1893, at his home in West Chester. He was interred at Fairview Presbyterian Church Cemetery in Glenmoore.
