= Evan Evans (Pennsylvania politician) =

American politician (1749–1823)

Member of the Pennsylvania House of Representatives from the Chester County district
- In office 1781–1784 Serving with David Thomas, Henry Hayes, Joseph Park, William Harris, James Boyd, Patrick Anderson, John Culbertson, James Moore, Persifor Frazer, Thomas Maffat, John Hannum III, John Lindsay, Thomas Strawbridge, Benjamin Brannan, Richard Willing, Thomas Potts, Thomas Bull, Edward Jones
- Preceded by: John Fulton, David Thomas, Henry Hayes, James Boyd, Patrick Anderson, Joseph Park, William Harris, Sketchley Morton
- Succeeded by: Richard Willing, Anthony Wayne, Edward Jones, Robert Ralston, James Moore, Thomas Potts, Persifor Frazer, Joseph Strawbridge, Charles Humphreys

Personal details
- Born: September 1749 Upper Uwchlan Township, Pennsylvania, U.S.
- Died: July 16, 1823 (aged 73)
- Party: Federalist
- Spouse: Jane Owen (m. 1780)
- Children: 11
- Relatives: Lewis H. Evans (grandson)
- Occupation: Politician; farmer

Evan Evans (September 1749 – July 16, 1823) was an American politician from Pennsylvania. He served as a member of the Pennsylvania House of Representatives, representing Chester County from 1781 to 1784.

== Early life ==
Evan Evans was born in September 1749 on a farm near the Eagle Hotel in Upper Uwchlan Township, Pennsylvania, to Eleanor (née Reese) and Thomas Evans.

== Career ==
Evans worked as a farmer.

Evans was a Federalist. He served as a member of the Pennsylvania House of Representatives, representing Chester County from 1781 to 1784.

== Personal life ==
Evans married Jane Owen, daughter of William Owen, of Upper Uwchlan Township on February 16, 1780. They had eleven children, Rebecca, Owen, Elinor, Thomas, Sarah, Ezekiel, Margaret, William, Richard, Hannah and Jane. His son Ezekiel was justice of the peace and his grandson Lewis H. Evans was a state legislator.

Evans died on July 16, 1823.
