= Thomas Potts (Pennsylvania politician) =

American politician (died 1785)

Member of the Pennsylvania House of Representatives from the Philadelphia County district
- In office 1784 – March 22, 1785 Serving with David Thomas, Evan Evans, John Hannum III, Joseph Park, Richard Willing, Thomas Bull, Edward Jones, Anthony Wayne, Robert Ralston, James Moore, Persifor Frazer, Joseph Strawbridge, Charles Humphreys
- Preceded by: Persifor Frazer, James Boyd, Evan Evans, Thomas Strawbridge, Benjamin Brannan, David Thomas, John Lindsay, Thomas Maffat
- Succeeded by: Anthony Wayne, Robert Ralston, James Moore, Thomas Bull, John Hannum, Robert Smith, Samuel Evans, Jonathan Morris

Member of the Pennsylvania House of Representatives from the Philadelphia County district
- In office 1775–1775

Personal details
- Died: March 22, 1785 (aged 50)
- Spouse: Anna Nutt (m. 1757)
- Occupation: Politician; businessman

Thomas Potts (died March 22, 1785) was an American politician and iron businessman from Pennsylvania. He served as a member of the Pennsylvania House of Representatives, representing Philadelphia County in 1775 and representing Chester County from 1784 to his death.

== Biography ==
Thomas Potts was one of the first working in the iron business in Pennsylvania. He was one of the original members of the American Philosophical Society.

Potts entertained George Washington at his home in Pottstown, Pennsylvania. He served as a member of the Pennsylvania House of Representatives, representing Philadelphia County in 1775. In 1776, he raised a battalion and was commissioned as colonel by the U.S. Congress. On July 9, 1776, he was a member of the convention assembled at the state house. He served as a member of the House of Representatives, representing Chester County from 1784 to the time of his death.

In 1757, Potts married Anna Nutt, daughter of Samuel Nutt Jr. They had a daughter Ruth. His grandson Addison May was a lawyer in Chester County. Potts died on March 22, 1785, aged 50.
