= 175th Pennsylvania Infantry Regiment =

- Also known as the 175th Pennsylvania or the 175th Pennsylvania Volunteers
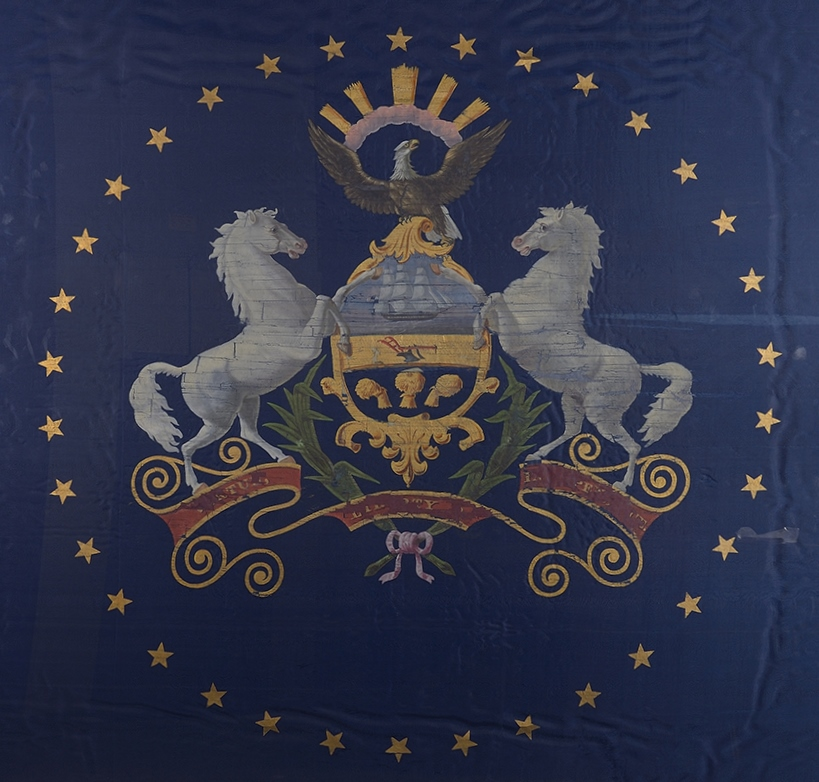
- Active: November, 1862 - August 7, 1863
- Country: United States
- Allegiance: Union; Pennsylvania
- Branch: Union Army
- Type: Infantry
- Size: 600 (At Washington)
- Part of: VII Corps; XVIII Corps; VIII Corps
- Engagements: Expedition from New Berne to Trenton, Pollocksville, Young’s Cross Roads and Swansborough (March 6–10); Operations on the Pamlico River (April 4–6); Battle of Washington (March 30, 1863 – April 20, 1863); Garrison duty at Little Washington (May); Skirmish at Harper's Ferry (June)

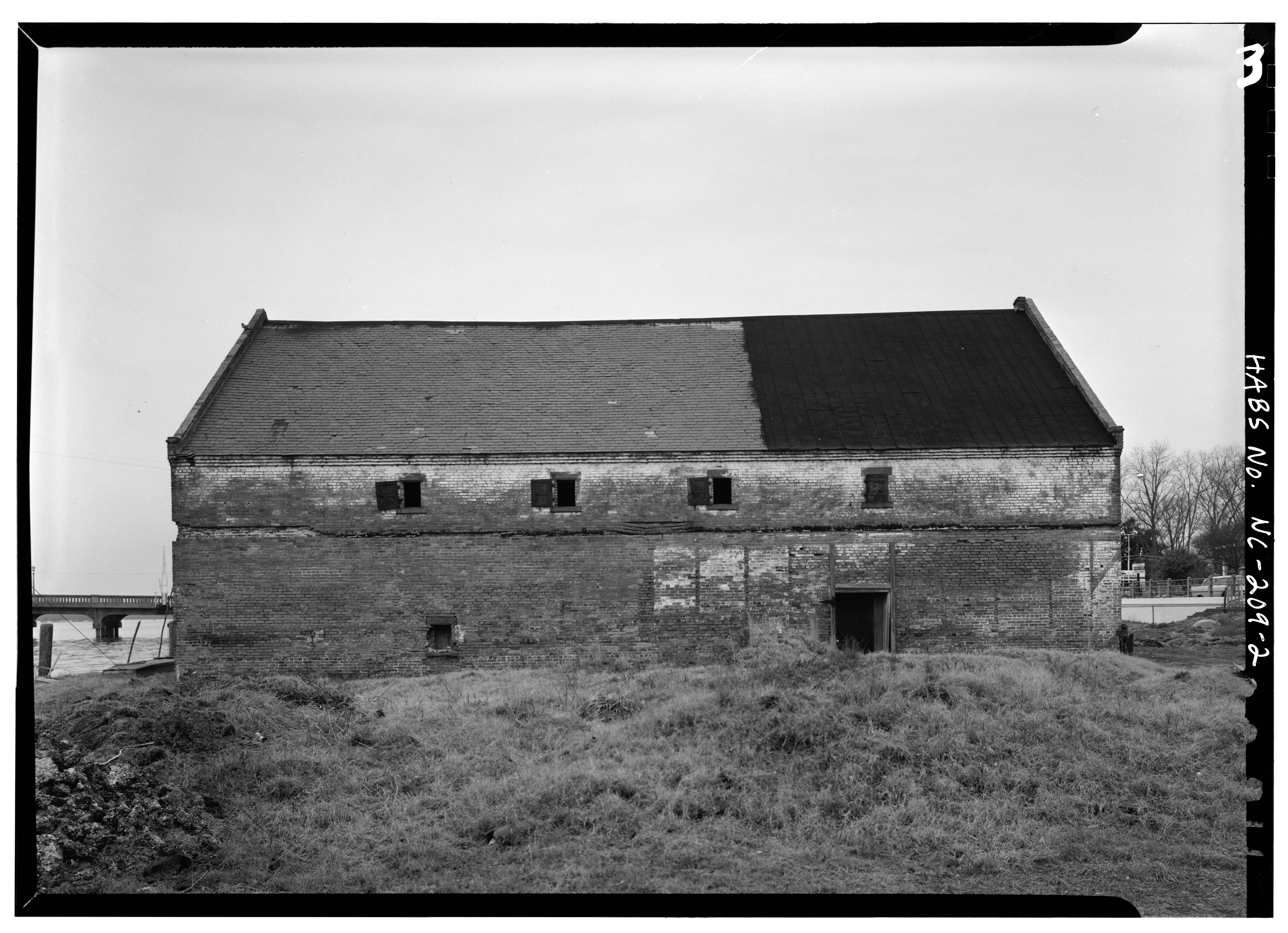
Remains of Havens Warehouse, which Union forces attempted to burn it, but would survive the Civil war.

The 175th Pennsylvania Infantry Regiment, also known as the 175th Pennsylvania Volunteer Infantry Regiment, was an infantry regiment that served with the Union army during the American Civil War. Consisting of Drafted men organized 1862 for nine months' service, the regiment mainly took part in operations in Virginia and North Carolina, briefly in Maryland and West Virginia.

== Organization ==
When Pennsylvania did not meet President Lincoln's August 1862 request for 300,000 nine-month volunteers, the Commonwealth drafted (under the Federal Militia Act of 1862) fifteen regiments between mid-October and early December 1862, totaling 15,000 men. All fifteen regiments were mustered out of service by mid-August 1863. Few saw any combat action.

The regiment was organized in Philadelphia, Pennsylvania on November, 1862, it was composed of companies recruited from Chester and Montgomery Counties.

== Service ==
=== Service in Virginia and North Carolina ===
On December 1, 1862, the regiment broke camp and headed to Suffolk, Virginia, where it was initially attached to Spinola's Brigade,VII Corps. From December 28 to January 1, 1863, the regiment moved to New Berne, North Carolina, where Spinola's Brigade was integrated into the 1st Brigade, 5th Division (Commanded by Brig. Gen. Henry Prince) of XVIII Corps. From then on, it established winter quarters and carried out drilling duties.

In March 1863, when Confederate forces under Maj. Gen. D.H Hill, threatened to advance onto the Union Stronghold of New Bern, the 175th Pennsylvania built earthworks on the south side of the Trent River, and took part in a Confederate attack on New Berne, which was repulsed. Following the attack on New Berne, Maj Gen. D.H Hill's forces moved to Washington, on the Pamlico River.

Following the battle, between March 6–10, the regiment took part in an expedition from New Bern, Trenton, Pollocksville, Young's Cross Roads, and Swansborough, the column marched for over 60 miles across sandy and swampy terrain, which attributed to the troops wearing heavy civilian boots rather than the standard government-issued marching shoes, the expedition ended with no casualties, and they returned to camp despite the heavy rain.

==== Battle of Washington (also known as the Siege of Little Washington) ====
Following the attack on New Berne, Maj Gen. D.H Hill's forces laid siege to the Union garrison at Washington, North Carolina, on the Tar River. The 175th Pennsylvania took part in an expedition to relieve Washington from April 4–10. Prince's 5th Division attempted to reinforce the town via water transport, aboard the USS Whitehead, but river obstructions, including Confederate artillery batteries, prevented passage. On March 31, the 175th boarded the steamer Emilie to travel down the Neuse River and to assist the besieged garrison. Upon reaching the Pamlico River on April 1, General Spinola found that his naval route was blocked. He initially ordered for Colonel Dyer to land the 175th near Blount's Creek and storm the Confederate earthworks at Hill's Point at daylight.

Instead of an overland assault, another naval passage was attempted. On April 4, 600 men of the 175th, alongside artillery, were loaded onto the Schooner Neilie D. to be towed past the batteries by the gunboat Lockwood. On the morning of April 5, the vessels approached the barricades but were turned back once naval officers determined that the water was too shallow for the gunboat to pass safely. After these naval efforts failed, Spinola attempted a relief effort that included the 175th Pennsylvania, but the column was halted at Blount's Creek, engaging the Confederates before retreating back to New Bern. The Confederates would abandon the siege due to Brig Gen. John Foster slipping out of the town to gather a large relief force for a counter-attack.

Following the siege, the regiment moved to Washington to conduct garrison duty and was transferred to the District of the Pamlico. While stationed at Washington, a detachment of the regiment was stationed at Fort Hill, and another one at Rodman's Point. The regiment continued to conduct garrison duty there for two months, in which they suffered significant casualties due to disease in the malarial environment, including the death of Lieutenants Evan Sheeler and John E. Miller.

=== Service in the Upper Potomac ===
towards the end of June 1863, the 175th was ordered to Fort Monroe, initially being ordered to take part in Dix's Peninsula Campaign, but was changed due to the Gettysburg Campaign, and was rushed to the Upper Potomac in blocking the Confederate retreat following the Battle of Gettysburg.

==== Skirmish at Harper's Ferry ====
The regiment arrived at Harper's Ferry, West Virginia, and was stationed on Maryland Heights before moving to Frederick, Maryland. The regiment returned to Sandy Hook, Maryland, where it was attached to Well's Brigade of the VIII Corps. The regiment would assist in constructing a pontoon bridge across the Potomac River into Harper's Ferry. Upon crossing, elements of the regiment were engaged in a skirmish with the 12th Virginia Cavalry, driving them out and occupying the town.

The regiment returned to Philadelphia and was mustered out of service on August 7, 1863.

== Casualties ==
The 175th Pennsylvania lost 21 men to disease.

== Commanders ==
- Colonel Samuel A. Dyer
- Lieutenant Colonel Francis C. Hooton
- Major Isaac M'Clure
- Captain Levi Fetters

== See also ==
- List of Pennsylvania Civil War regiments
- Pennsylvania in the Civil War
