= John A. Reynolds =

American politician (1820–1889)

Member of the Pennsylvania House of Representatives from the Chester County district
- In office 1879–1882 Serving with Samuel Butler, William T. Fulton, Jesse Matlack, Theodore K. Stubbs, John T. Potts, William Wayne
- Preceded by: Samuel Butler, William T. Fulton, Jesse Matlack, John P. Edge
- Succeeded by: John T. Potts, Theodore K. Stubbs, William Wayne, Levi Fetters

Personal details
- Born: John Andrew Reynolds; August 15, 1820 Colerain Township, Lancaster County, Pennsylvania, U.S.
- Died: April 26, 1889 (aged 68) Atglen, Pennsylvania, U.S.
- Resting place: Penningtonville Cemetery; Atglen, Pennsylvania, U.S.
- Party: Republican
- Children: 6
- Occupation: Politician; businessman; marshall

John Andrew Reynolds (August 15, 1820 – April 26, 1889) was an American politician from Pennsylvania. He served as a member of the Pennsylvania House of Representatives, representing Chester County from 1879 to 1882.

== Early life ==
John Andrew Reynolds was born on August 15, 1820, in Colerain Township, Lancaster County, Pennsylvania. He attended West Nottingham Academy in Cecil County, Maryland.

== Career ==
In 1848, Reynolds was first lieutenant in the Maryland Militia during the Mexican–American War.

Reynolds worked in the merchandising business. He was school director in Sadsbury Township, Chester County, Pennsylvania, for nine years. He was school director in Atglen. He was a deputy for the United States Marshals Service in 1870. He was also a fire insurance agent and grocer. He was treasurer of the Chester County Mutual Fire Insurance Company for four years.

Reynolds was a Republican. He served as a member of the Pennsylvania House of Representatives, representing Chester County from 1879 to 1882. He was justice of the peace of Atglen at the time of his death.

== Personal life ==
Reynolds married. He had four sons and two daughters.

Reynolds died following a stroke on April 26, 1889, at his home in Atglen. He was interred at Penningtonville Cemetery in Atglen.
