= John T. Potts =

American politician (1841–1923)

Member of the Pennsylvania House of Representatives from the Chester County district
- In office 1881–1884 Serving with John A. Reynolds, Theodore K. Stubbs, William Wayne, Levi Fetters
- Preceded by: Samuel Butler, William T. Fulton, Jesse Matlack, John A. Reynolds
- Succeeded by: Theodore K. Stubbs, William Wayne, Levi Fetters, Levi B. Kaler

Personal details
- Born: John Templin Potts; February 28, 1841 Buckingham County, Virginia, U.S.
- Died: March 25, 1923 (aged 82) Philadelphia, Pennsylvania, U.S.
- Resting place: Mount Moriah Cemetery; Philadelphia, Pennsylvania, U.S.
- Party: Republican
- Spouse: Ada Grace (died 1919)
- Occupation: Politician; farmer; bookkeeper

John Templin Potts (February 28, 1841 – March 25, 1923) was an American politician from Pennsylvania. He served as a member of the Pennsylvania House of Representatives, representing Chester County from 1881 to 1884.

== Early life ==
John Templin Potts was born on February 28, 1841, in Buckingham County, Virginia. His father had large land interests in the area. He attended Pottstown and Pottsville Academies in Chester County, Pennsylvania.

== Career ==
In 1861, Potts served as a private in Company C of the 4th Pennsylvania Infantry Regiment. He was then a second lieutenant in Company A of the 53rd Pennsylvania Infantry Regiment from 1861 to 1863. He was wounded at the Battles of Antietam and Fredericksburg. He became a member of the 6th Veteran Reserve Corps. On June 6, 1864, he was promoted to captain of the military police in Washington, D.C., by President Abraham Lincoln. In the late 1860s, he was treasurer of Chester County in 1868.

Potts worked in iron manufacturing and as a farmer.

Potts was a Republican. He served as a member of the Pennsylvania House of Representatives, representing Chester County from 1881 to 1884. In 1883, he ran for Pennsylvania Auditor General, but lost to Jerome B. Niles.

Potts was door keeper and bookkeeper of the Philadelphia Mint.

== Personal life ==
Potts married Ada Grace. His wife died in 1919. He lived at Warwick Furnace Farms in Chester County.

Potts died on March 25, 1923, at his home at 142 North 21st Street in Philadelphia. He was interred at Mount Moriah Cemetery in Philadelphia.
