= John P. Edge =

American politician (1822–1904)

Member of the Pennsylvania House of Representatives from the Chester County district
- In office 1875–1878 Serving with Elisha W. Baily, Peter G. Carey, George Fairlamb Smith, Samuel Butler, William T. Fulton, Jesse Matlack
- Preceded by: Levi Prizer and Elisha W. Baily
- Succeeded by: Samuel Butler, William T. Fulton, Jesse Matlack, John A. Reynolds

Personal details
- Born: John Pennell Edge; June 22, 1822 East Caln Township, Pennsylvania, U.S.
- Died: March 7, 1904 (aged 81) Downingtown, Pennsylvania, U.S.
- Resting place: Downingtown Friends Meetinghouse Cemetery
- Party: Republican
- Education: Jefferson Medical College (MD)
- Occupation: Politician; educator; farmer; physician

John Pennell Edge (June 22, 1822 – March 7, 1904) was an American politician from Pennsylvania. He served as a member of the Pennsylvania House of Representatives, representing Chester County from 1875 to 1878.

== Early life ==
John Pennell Edge was born on June 22, 1822, in the Ship tavern house in East Caln Township, Pennsylvania. He attended neighborhood schools and the Westtown Friends' Boarding School for three years. He taught public and private schools and read medicine. He graduated from Jefferson Medical College in 1846 or 1847 with a Doctor of Medicine.

== Career ==
Edge served as a private in Companies D and I in the 72nd Pennsylvania Infantry Regiment in 1861. He was a teacher and farmer. He practiced medicine in Downingtown.

Edge was a Republican. He served as a member of the Pennsylvania House of Representatives, representing Chester County from 1875 to 1878. He was chairman of the geologic survey committee. He organized the bill to establish the Pennsylvania Board of Agriculture. In 1880, he ran unsuccessful for the Pennsylvania Senate.

Edge was appointed as a member of the Pennsylvania Board of Agriculture. He was appointed by Governor John F. Hartranft and served on the board in 1877 and was re-appointed by multiple administrations. He was superintendent of the board under Governor Daniel H. Hastings in the 1890s. He was president of the Downingtown Library Company for a time. He was a member of the Chester County Medical Society after its reorganization.

== Personal life ==
Edge died on March 7, 1904, at his home in Downingtown. He was interred at Downingtown Friends Meetinghouse Cemetery.
