= Oxford Historic District (Oxford, Pennsylvania) =

Historic district in Pennsylvania, United States

- U.S. National Register of Historic Places
- U.S. Historic district
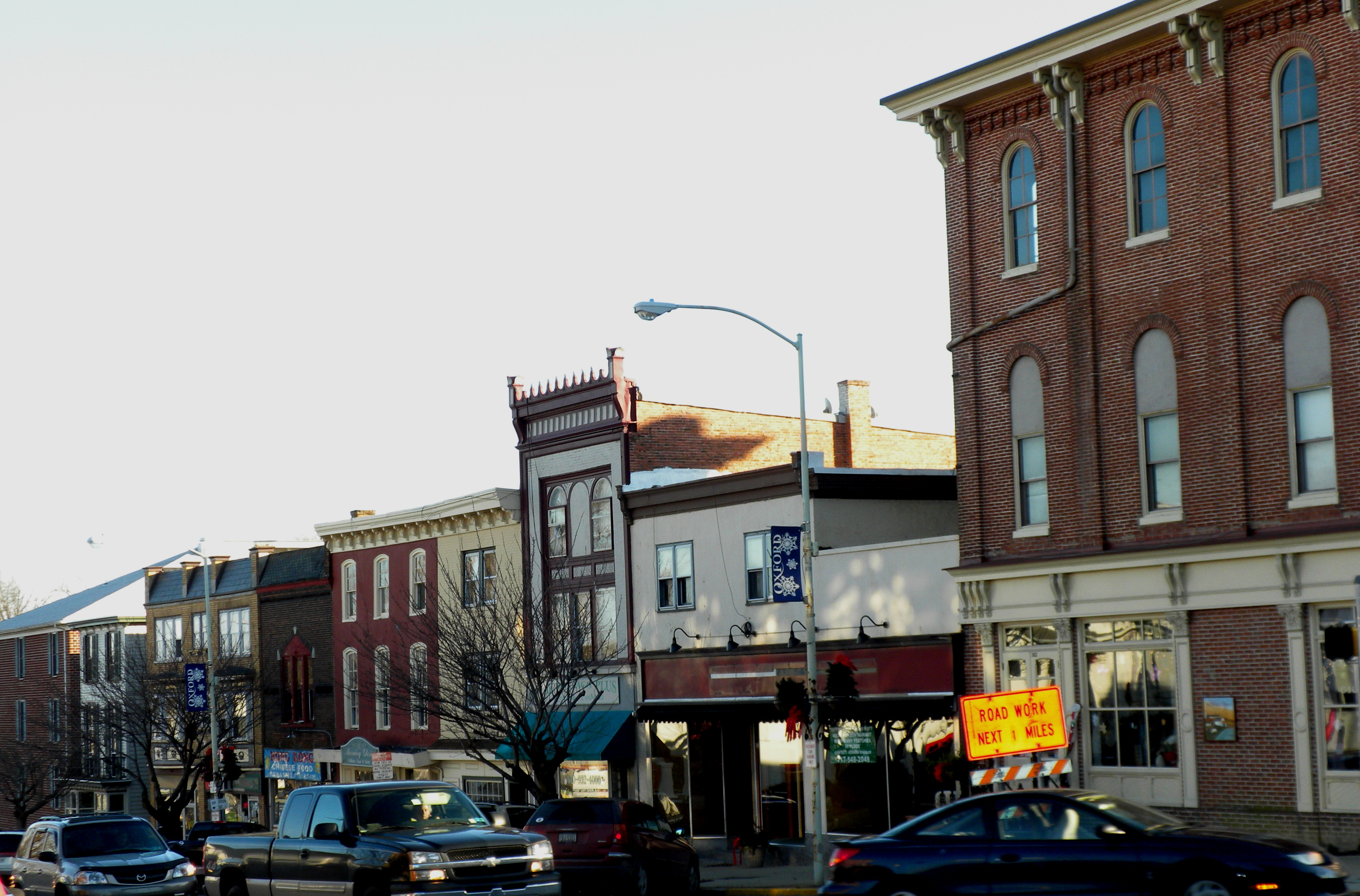
- Oxford Historic District, December 2009

- Location within Pennsylvania Location within the United States
- Location: Roughly bounded by Church Rd. Chase St., Hodgson St., Oxford, Pennsylvania
- Coordinates: 39°47′07″N 75°58′44″W
- Area: 640 acres (260 ha)
- Built: 1833
- Architectural style: Queen Anne, Italianate, et al.
- NRHP reference No.: 06001336
- Added to NRHP: February 1, 2007

The Oxford Historic District is a national historic district that is located in Oxford, Chester County, Pennsylvania.

It was added to the National Register of Historic Places in 2007.

== History and architectural features ==
This district encompasses 517 contributing buildings, one contributing site, and one contributing structure that are located in the central business district and surrounding residential areas of Oxford. They are mostly brick residential and commercial structures that were built between 1870 and 1910 and in a variety of popular architectural styles including Queen Anne and Italianate. Notable non-residential buildings include the Oxford Hall, Octoraro Hotel, Oxford Station (Borough Hall), Dickey Building, Masonic Building, Fulton Bank Building (1925), Gibson's Store (c. 1832), Orthodox Friends Meeting House, Methodist Church (1885), United Presbyterian Church (1893), and the Oxford Grain & Hay Company granary (1880). The Oxford Hotel is also located in the district, but is listed separately.

== Gallery ==
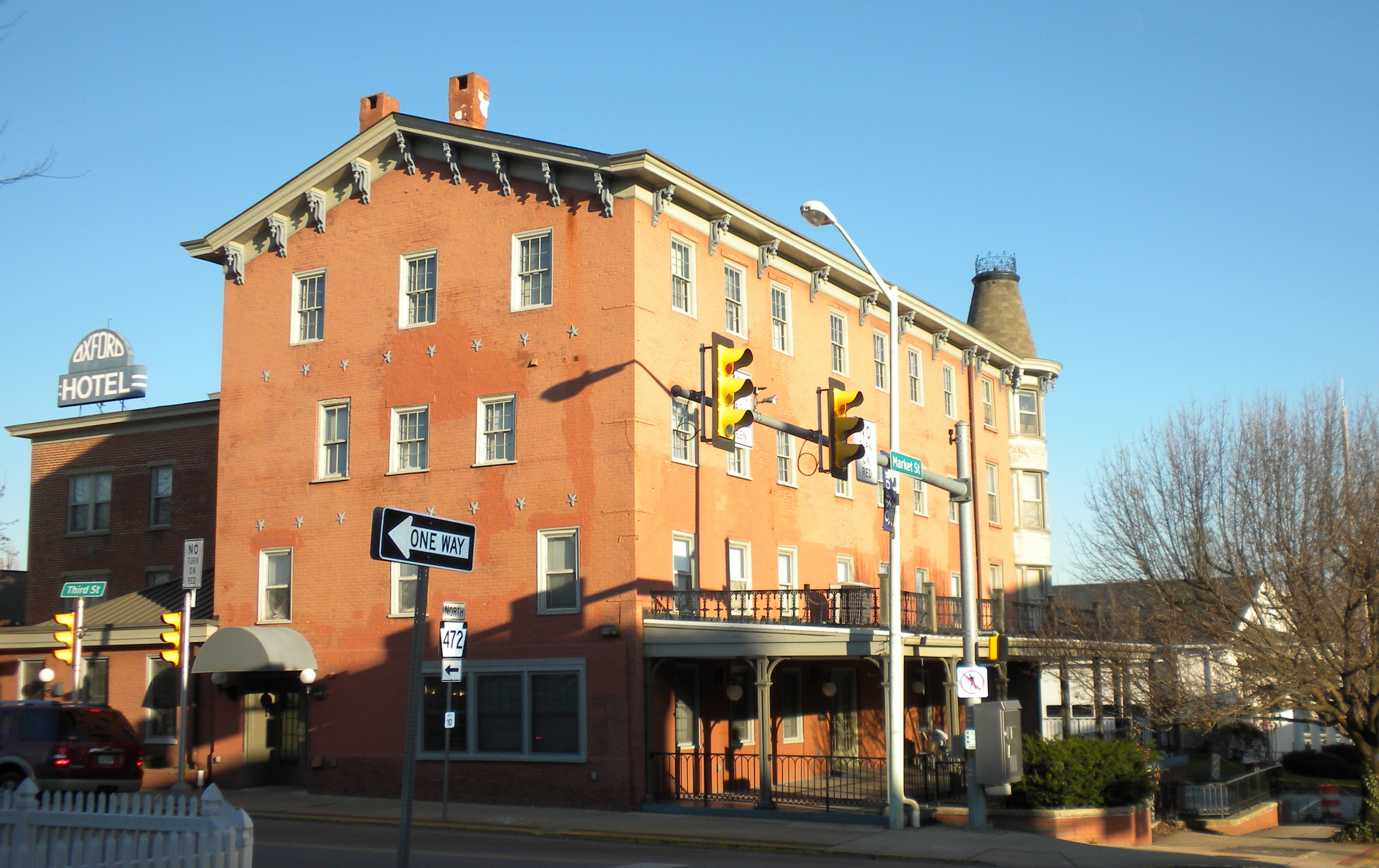
Oxford Hotel

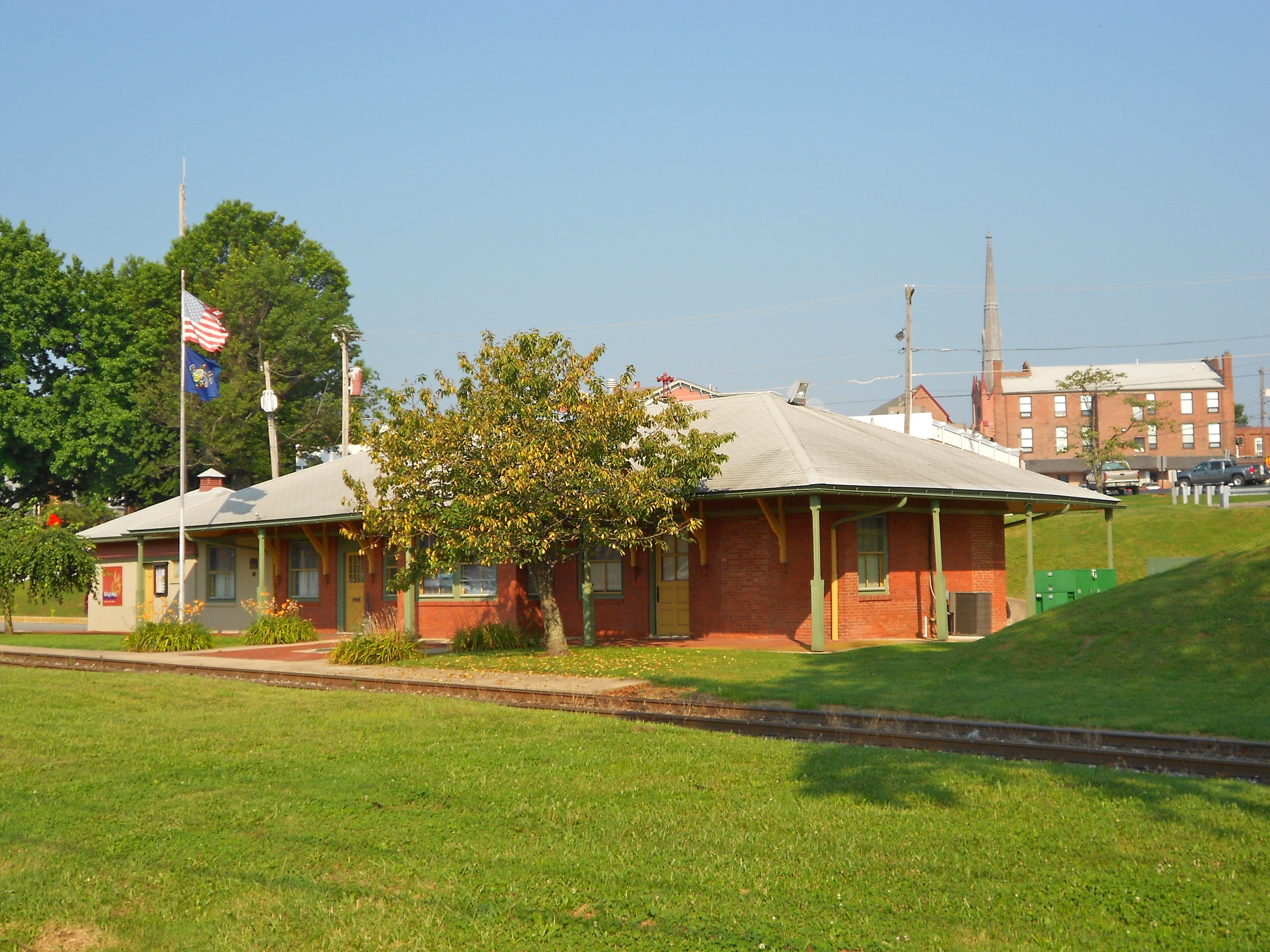
Train station, built 1901, now houses the town hall

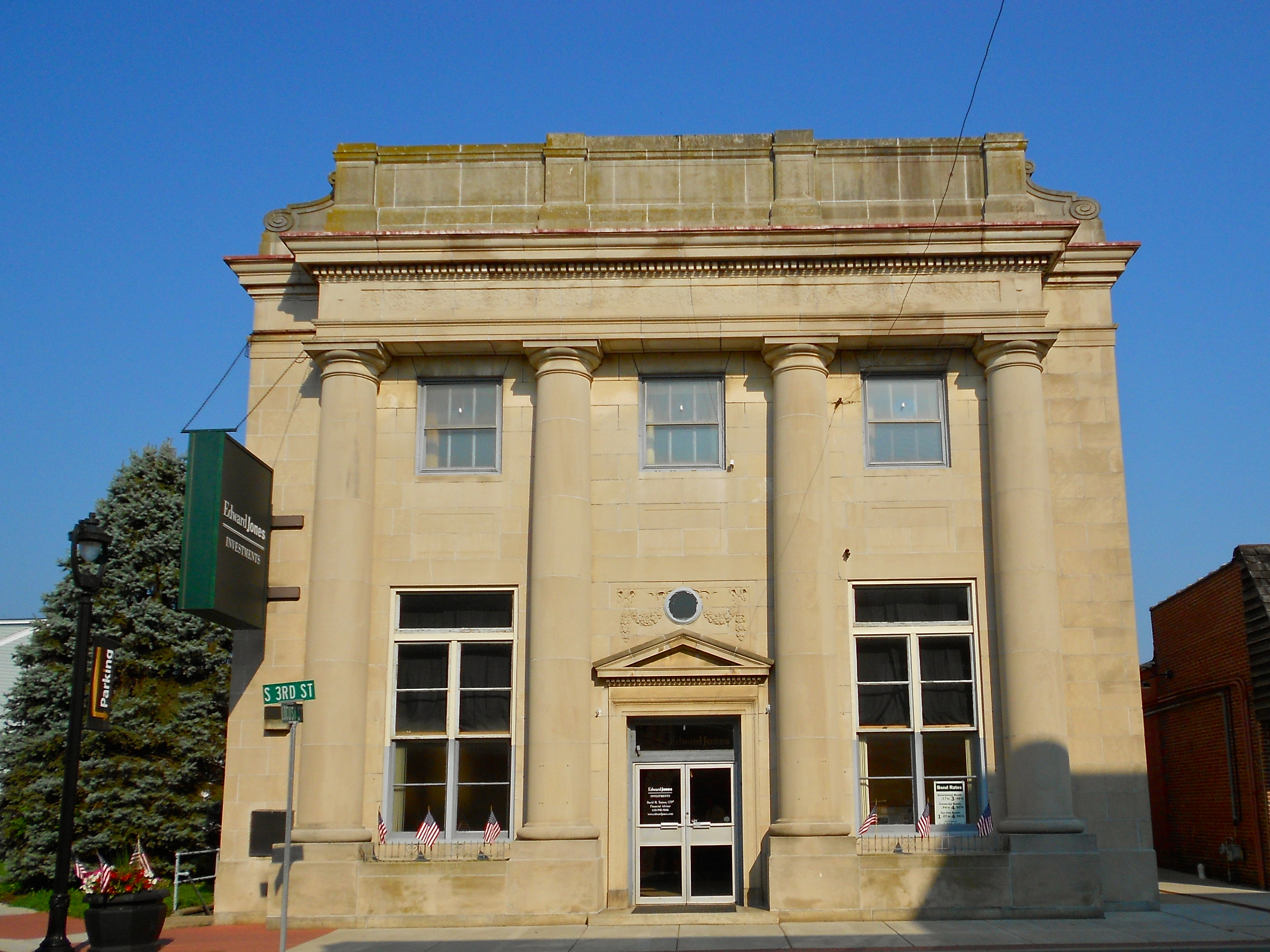
Former bank building at 3rd and Locust Streets
