= Oxford Hotel (Oxford, Pennsylvania) =

Historic hotel building in Pennsylvania, United States

- U.S. National Register of Historic Places
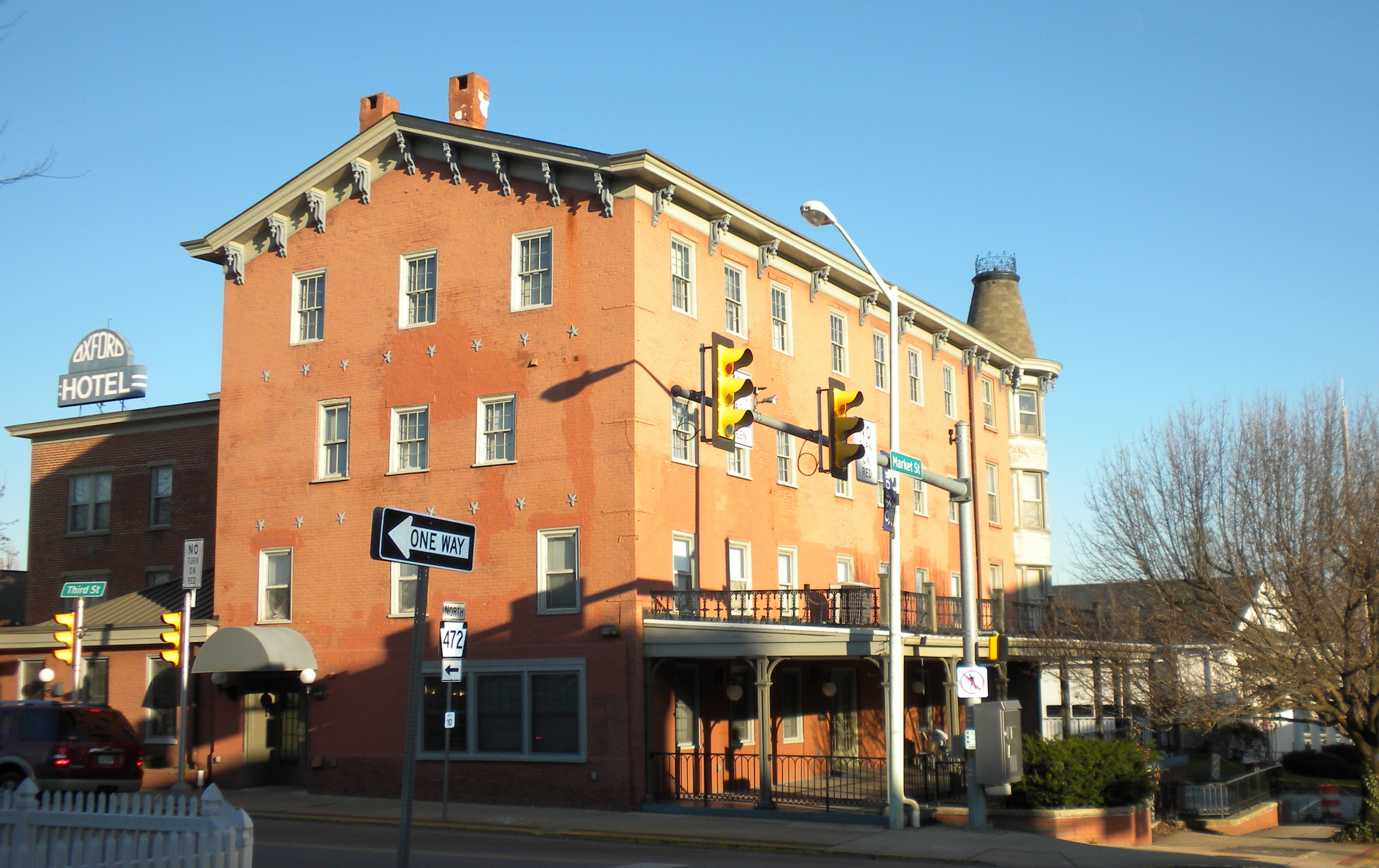
- Oxford Hotel, December 2009

- Location within Pennsylvania Location within the United States
- Location: Jct. of Market and N. 3rd Sts., Oxford, Pennsylvania
- Coordinates: 39°47′7″N 75°58′44″W
- Area: 0.5 acres (0.20 ha)
- Built: 1853, 1888, 1894, 1924
- Architect: Jones, George
- Architectural style: Italianate
- NRHP reference No.: 94001055
- Added to NRHP: August 26, 1994

The Oxford Hotel is an historic hotel that is located in Oxford, Chester County, Pennsylvania, United States.

Added to the National Register of Historic Places in 1994, it is located in the Oxford Historic District.

== History and architectural features ==
This historic hotel is a four-story, brick structure that was designed in the Italianate style. The original hotel was built in 1853, and was a three-story, brick, L-shaped structure with a steeply pitched gable roof. The building was later enlarged and modified in 1888, 1894, and 1924. The building has been converted to apartments.

== Gallery ==
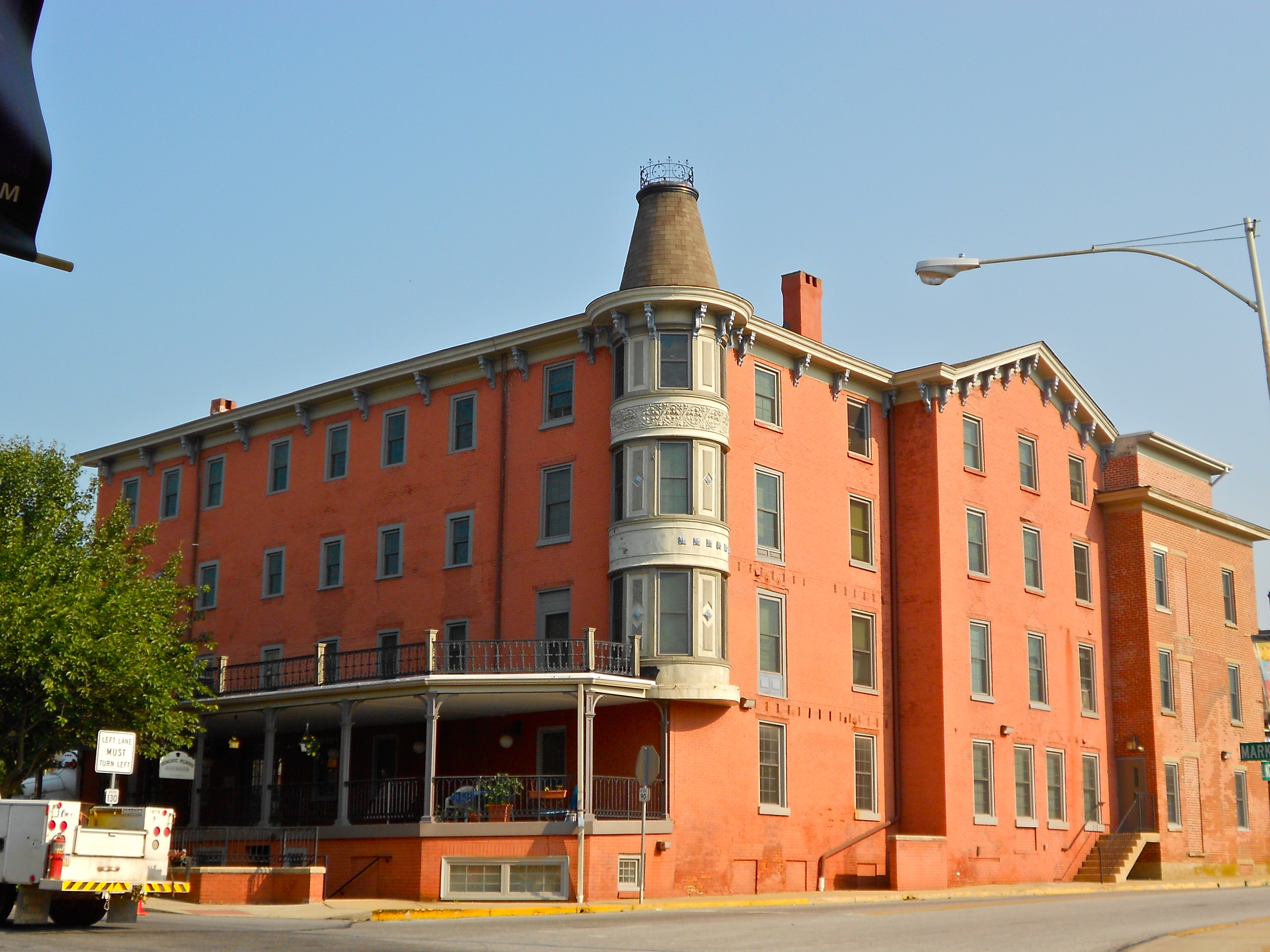
View from Market Street
