= John W. Hickman (Pennsylvania politician) =

American politician (1831–1906)

Member of the Pennsylvania House of Representatives from the Chester County district
- In office 1887–1890 Serving with Lewis H. Evans, William W. McConnell, D. Smith Talbot
- Preceded by: Theodore K. Stubbs, William Wayne, Levi Fetters, Levi B. Kaler
- Succeeded by: David H. Branson, William Preston Snyder, Joseph G. West

Personal details
- Born: John Wilson Hickman; April 17, 1831 Russellville, Pennsylvania, U.S.
- Died: December 18, 1906 (aged 75) Chester County, Pennsylvania, U.S.
- Resting place: Beulah Baptist Church Cemetery; Russellville, Pennsylvania, U.S.
- Party: Republican
- Occupation: Politician; farmer

John Wilson Hickman (April 17, 1831 – December 18, 1906) was an American politician from Pennsylvania. He served as a member of the Pennsylvania House of Representatives, representing Chester County from 1887 to 1890.

== Early life ==
John Wilson Hickman was born on April 17, 1831, in Russellville, Pennsylvania. He attended public and private schools in Chester County.

== Career ==
Hickman worked in the milling business. He was school director and was assistant assessor of internal revenue during the Civil War. He was elected to the council and served as justice of the peace in Coatesville. He also worked as a farmer and was owner of a livery stable.

Hickman was a Republican. He served as a member of the Pennsylvania House of Representatives, representing Chester County from 1887 to 1890.

== Personal life ==
Hickman died on December 18, 1906, in Chester County. He was interred at Beulah Baptist Church Cemetery in Russellville.
