= William W. McConnell =

American politician (1834–1895)

Member of the Pennsylvania House of Representatives from the Chester County district
- In office 1887–1890 Serving with Lewis H. Evans, John W. Hickman, D. Smith Talbot
- Preceded by: Theodore K. Stubbs, William Wayne, Levi Fetters, Levi B. Kaler
- Succeeded by: David H. Branson, William Preston Snyder, Joseph G. West

Personal details
- Born: William Wirt McConnell; May 4, 1834 Honey Brook, Pennsylvania, U.S.
- Died: December 26, 1895 (aged 61) Philadelphia, Pennsylvania, U.S.
- Resting place: Honey Brook Presbyterian Cemetery; Honey Brook, Pennsylvania, U.S.
- Party: Republican
- Occupation: Politician; businessman

William Wirt McConnell (May 4, 1834 – December 26, 1895) was an American politician from Pennsylvania. He served as a member of the Pennsylvania House of Representatives, representing Chester County from 1887 to 1890.

== Early life ==
William Wirt McConnell was born on May 4, 1834, in Honey Brook, Pennsylvania. He attended Howard Academy in Rockville, Chester County.

== Career ==
During the Civil War, McConnell served in the commissary department. He worked at a rolling mill and for a mercantile business. He owned a hardware store in Honey Brook.

McConnell was a Republican. He served as a member of the Pennsylvania House of Representatives, representing Chester County from 1887 to 1890. In 1893, he was a delegate to the Republican state convention.

McConnell was director of the Chester County Trust Company.

== Personal life ==
McConnell was a member of the Honey Brook Presbyterian Church.

McConnell died on December 26, 1895, at his sister's home in Philadelphia. He was in Philadelphia receiving treatment. He was interred at Honey Brook Presbyterian Cemetery. His funeral was attended by local politicians, including Smedley Darlington, D. Smith Talbot and C. Wesley Talbot.
