= Honey Brook, Pennsylvania =

Borough in Pennsylvania, US

- Borough
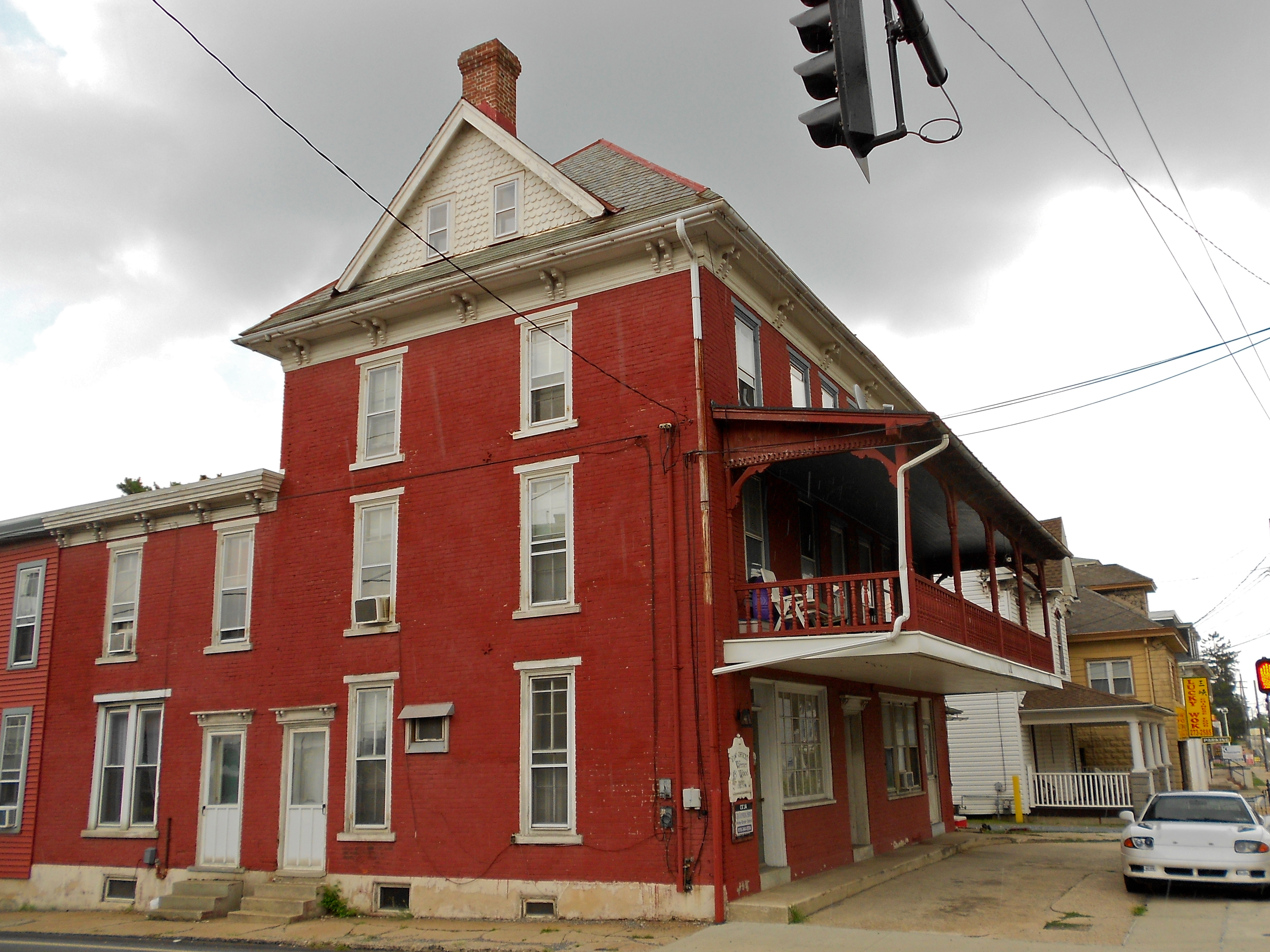
- Corner of US 322 and Rt 10

- Location in Chester County and the U.S. state of Pennsylvania

- Location in Pennsylvania Location in the United States
- Coordinates: 40°05′39″N 75°54′35″W
- Country: United States
- State: Pennsylvania
- County: Chester
- Incorporated: 1891

Government
  - Mayor: Matthew Halvorsen

Area
  - Total: 0.48 sq mi (1.24 km^{2})
  - Land: 0.48 sq mi (1.24 km^{2})
  - Water: 0 sq mi (0.00 km^{2})
- Elevation: 738 ft (225 m)

Population (2020)
  - Total: 1,892
  - Density: 3,950/sq mi (1,525.1/km^{2})
- Time zone: UTC-5 (EST)
  - Summer (DST): UTC-4 (EDT)
- ZIP code: 19344
- Area codes: 610 and 484
- FIPS code: 42-35528
- Website: www.honeybrookborough.net

Honey Brook is a borough in Chester County, Pennsylvania, United States. The population of the borough was 1,895 at the 2020 census. The borough is surrounded by Honey Brook Township, and both are referred to locally collectively as Honey Brook.

== History ==
Honey Brook Township was divided from Nantmeal Township in 1789. The owner of the surrounding property, Andrew Boyer, established a town plan for the village of Waynesburg (named in honor of Revolutionary War general Mad Anthony Wayne) and began selling lots in June 1813. There is a story that this was done by a schoolmaster named Stinson, but all of the deeds reference Boyer as the owner with no mention of Stinson, and there was nobody named Stinson in the Federal 1810 or 1920 census reports for Chester County. This "myth" seems to have originated in the 19th century.

The residents changed the name to Honey Brook in 1884. Honey Brook is an incorrect English translation of Nantmel, a village in Radnorshire, now part of Powys. The Welsh name Nantmel actually means 'Maël's valley', Maël being a tenth-century prince. Honey Brook was incorporated as a borough in 1891.

In 1884 the railroad from Philadelphia-Downingtown-Lancaster was completed and ran along the south side of Horseshoe Pike. The railroad caused a problem for the village: there was another Waynesburg in western Pennsylvania. The freight was being routed to the wrong stations, so the name was changed from Waynesburg to Honey Brook.

As the town grew, a petition was circulated in 1891 for the town to be incorporated into a borough. Almost every homeowner signed. With the incorporation as a borough, the main problems to overcome were: street lighting, sidewalks, and, several years later, water.

The borough accepted public water in September 1896. Electric streetlights were installed after much discussion in 1915. Before that, gas lamps were used to light the streets. Over the years, boardwalks were replaced by bricks, then by concrete sidewalks. There are still two brick sidewalks in the borough. Horseshoe Pike, formerly Main Street, has the only fully paved sidewalks in the borough.

When the borough was incorporated, the census was around 600. As of the census in 2000, the population had doubled.

The oldest organization in Honey Brook Borough is Honey Brook United Methodist Church. The longest continuous business is W.L. White's & Sons.

== Geography ==
Honey Brook is at 40°5′39″N 75°54′35″W (40.094260, -75.909799).

According to the United States Census Bureau, the borough has a total area of 0.5 square miles (1.3 km^{2}), all land. The borough lies on a ridge between the headwaters of the east and west branches of the Brandywine Creek.

== Demographics ==
Historical population
Census	Pop.	Note	%±
1880	470		—
1890	514		9.4%
1900	609		18.5%
1910	581		−4.6%
1920	585		0.7%
1930	654		11.8%
1940	766		17.1%
1950	864		12.8%
1960	1,023		18.4%
1970	1,115		9.0%
1980	1,164		4.4%
1990	1,184		1.7%
2000	1,287		8.7%
2010	1,713		33.1%
2020	1,892		10.4%
2021 (est.)	1,895	▲	0.2%

At the 2010 census, the borough was 93.1% non-Hispanic White, 1.1% Black or African American, 0.2% Asian, 0.1% Native Hawaiian or other Pacific Islander, and 3.2% were two or more races. 3.5% of the population were of Hispanic or Latino ancestry .

As of the census of 2000, there were 1,287 people, 474 households, and 337 families residing in the borough. The population density was 2,616.7 inhabitants per square mile (1,010.3/km^{2}). There were 500 housing units at an average density of 1,016.6 per square mile (392.5/km^{2}). The racial makeup of the borough was 97.1% White, 0.2% African American.

There were 474 households, out of which 41.4% had children under the age of 18 living with them, 56.8% were married couples living together, 11.2% had a female householder with no husband present, and 28.7% were non-families. 23.0% of all households were made up of individuals, and 14.3% had someone living alone who was 65 years of age or older. The average household size was 2.71 and the average family size was 3.22.

In the borough the population was spread out, with 29.6% under the age of 18, 8.6% from 18 to 24, 33.5% from 25 to 44, 15.8% from 45 to 64, and 12.5% who were 65 years of age or older. The median age was 33 years. For every 100 females there were 91.2 males. For every 100 females age 18 and over, there were 83.0 males.

The median income for a household in the borough was $46,319, and the median income for a family was $56,417. Males had a median income of $37,857 versus $28,636 for females. The per capita income for the borough was $19,205. About 6.2% of families and 7.4% of the population were below the poverty line, including 8.4% of those under age 18 and 2.5% of those age 65 or over.

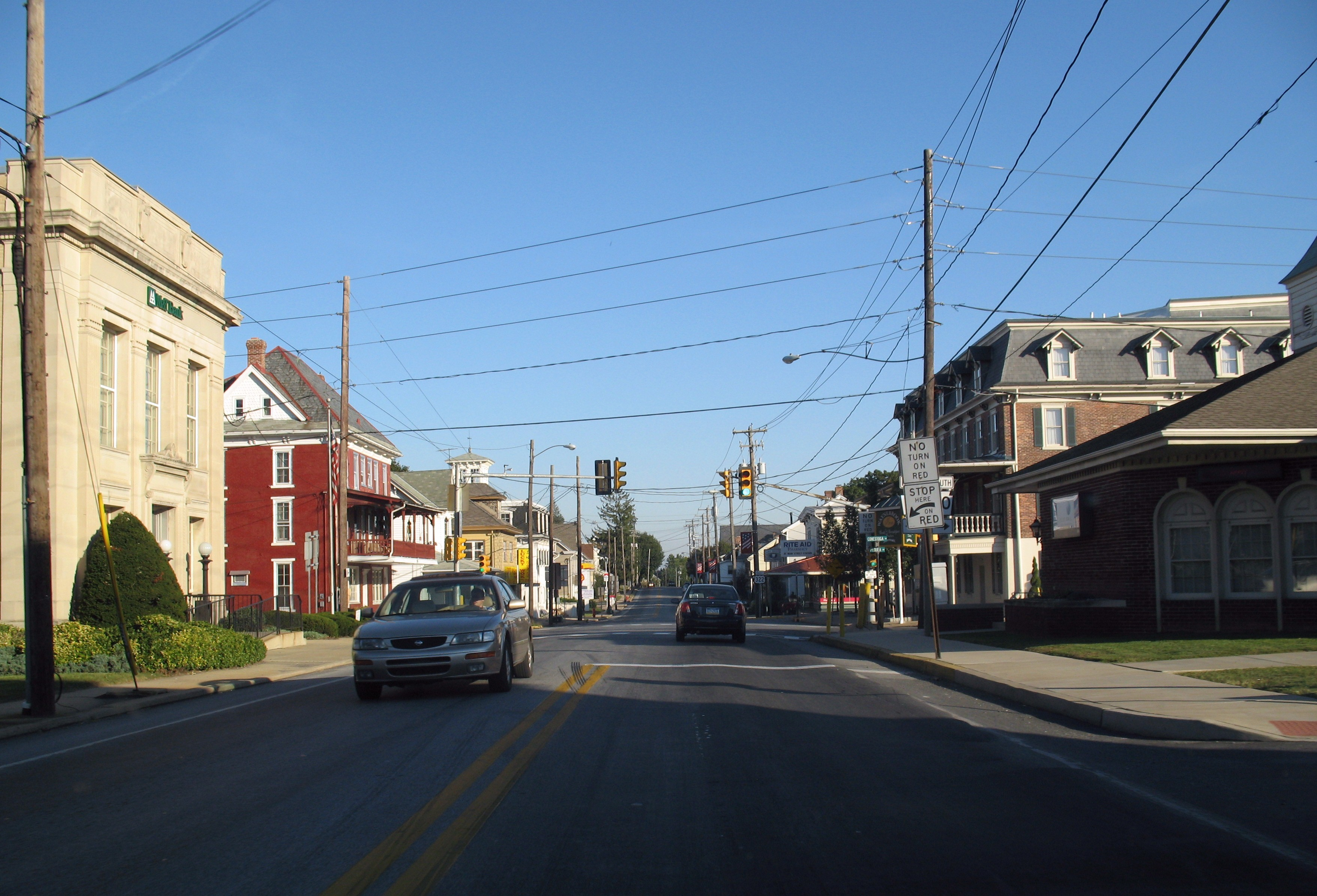
US 322 near State Route 10

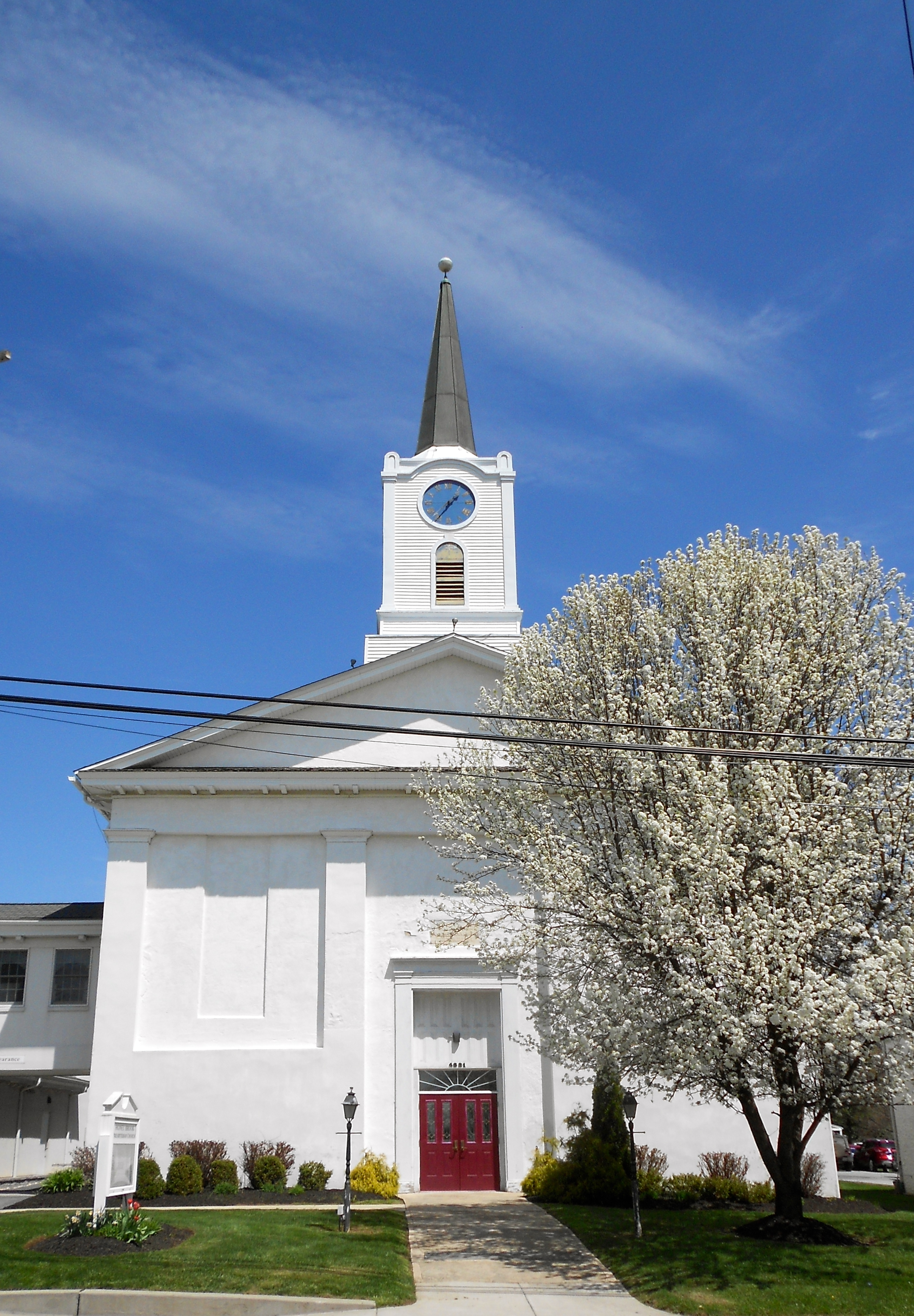
Presbyterian church

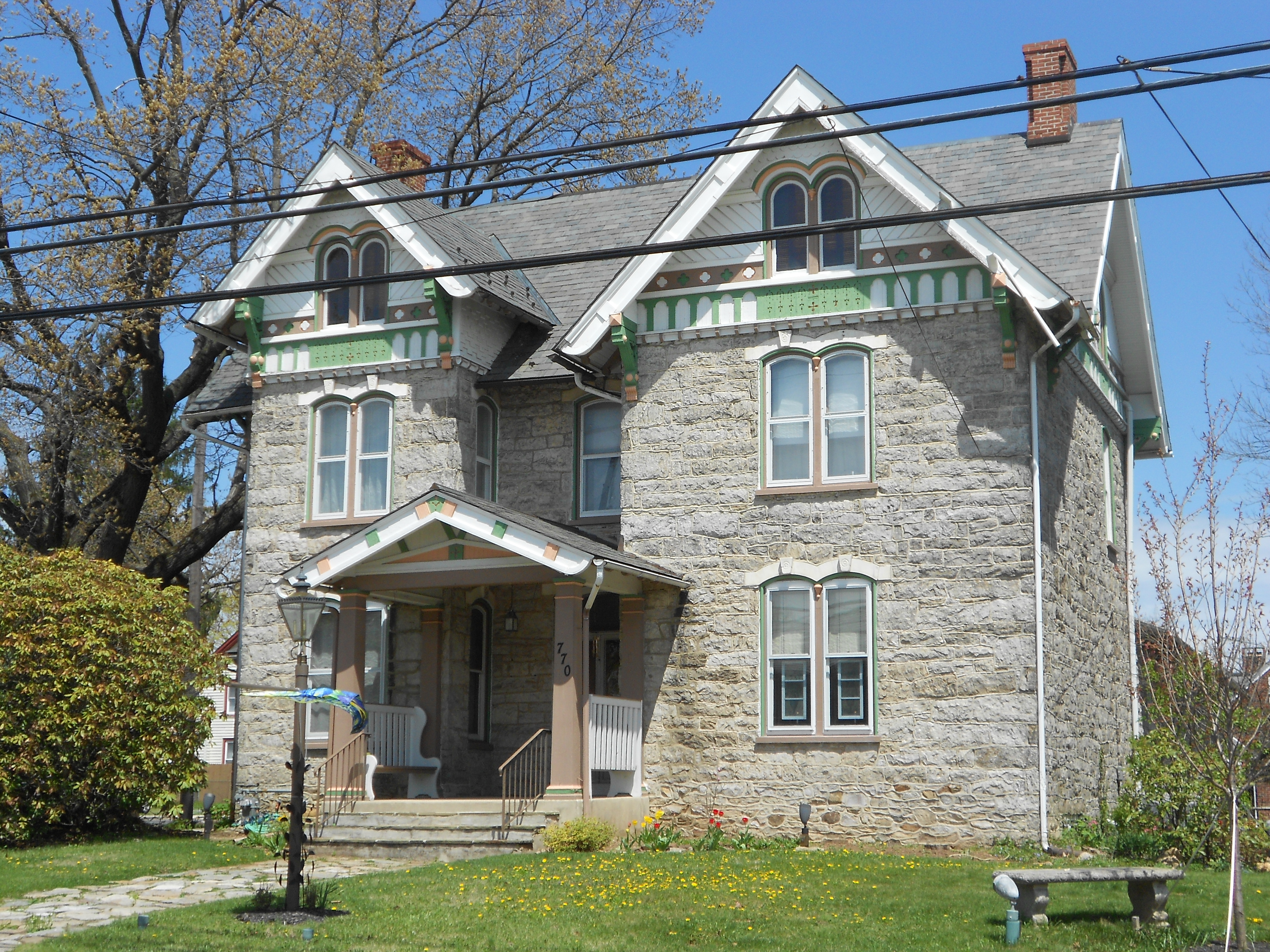

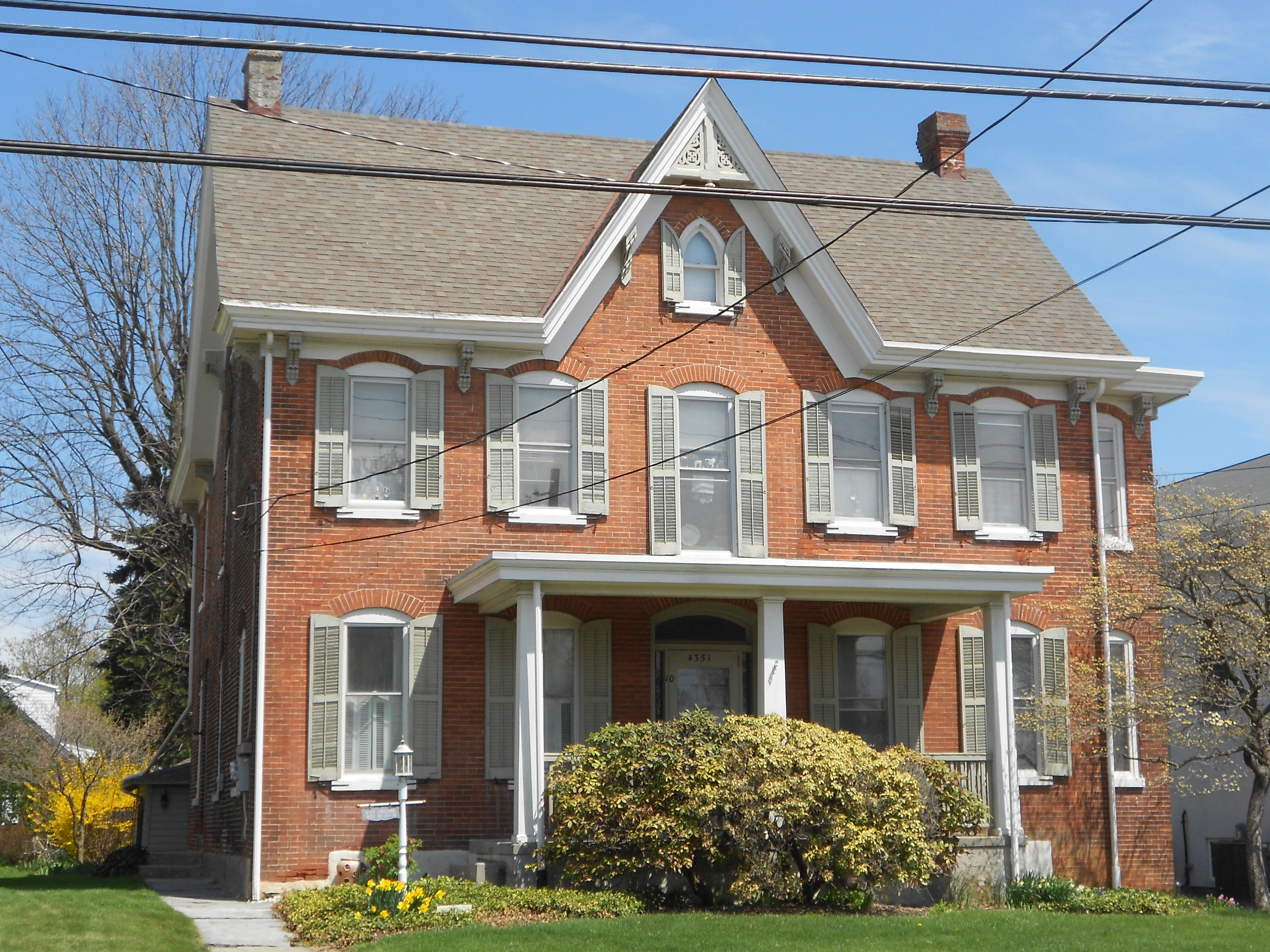

== Transportation ==
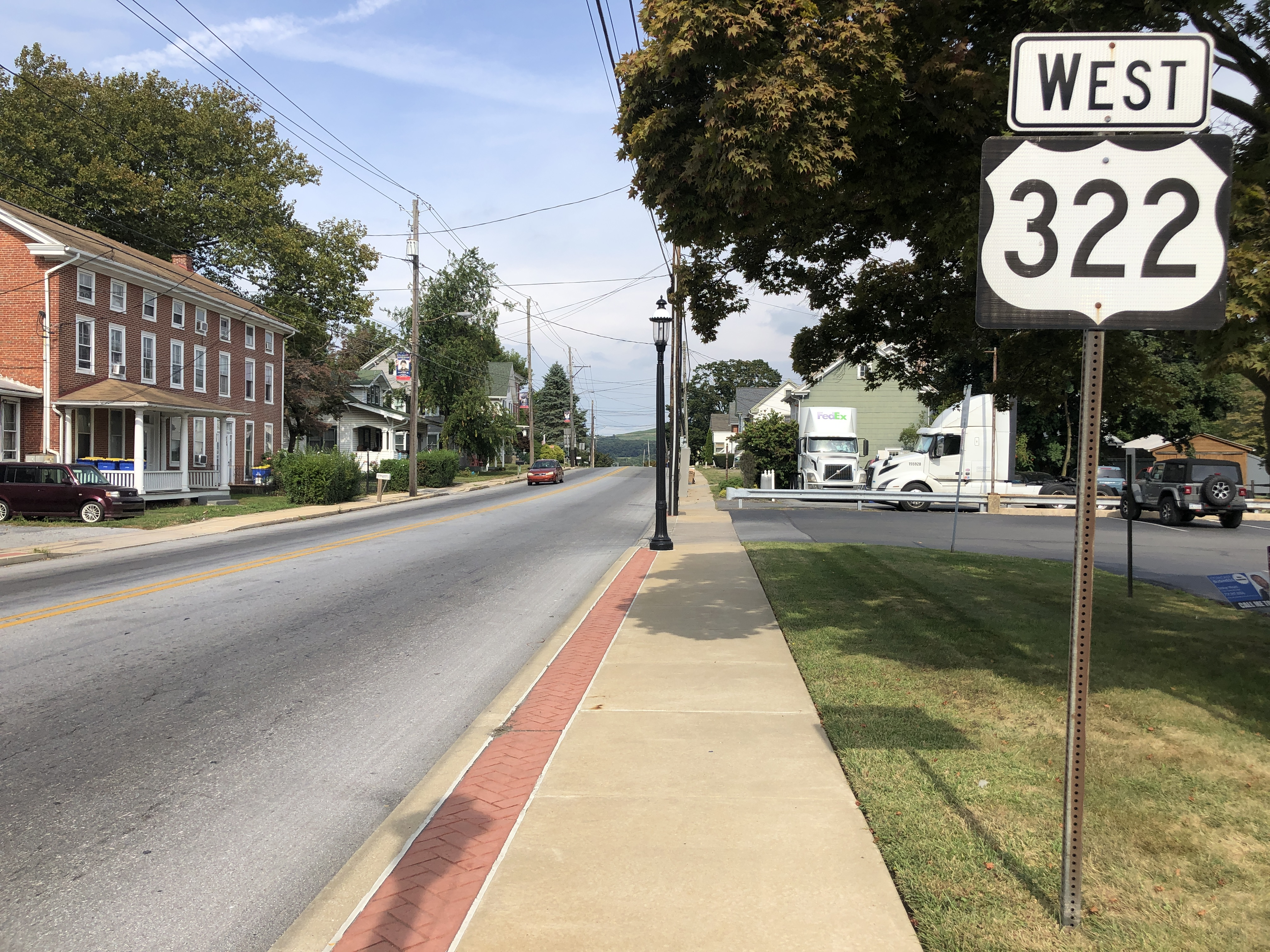
US 322 westbound in Honey Brook

As of 2010, there were 6.34 miles (10.20 km) of public roads in Honey Brook, of which 1.52 miles (2.45 km) were maintained by Pennsylvania Department of Transportation (PennDOT) and 4.82 miles (7.76 km) were maintained by the borough.

Two numbered highways serve Honey Brook. U.S. Route 322 crosses the central part of the borough on a northwest-to-southeast alignment via Horseshoe Pike. Pennsylvania Route 10 traverses the northwestern portion of the borough on a southwest-to-northeast alignment via Pequea Avenue and Conestoga Avenue.

== Education ==
The school district is Twin Valley School District.

Honey Brook Elementary Center is in nearby Honey Brook Township. Twin Valley Middle School and Twin Valley High School are in Caernarvon Township, Berks County, and have Elverson postal addresses.

== Notable people ==
- A.J. Alexy (born 1998), Major League Baseball pitcher
- John Castle (1879–1929), Major League Baseball outfielder, minor league and college baseball manager
- Mat Madiro (born 1991), metal band drummer
- William W. McConnell (1834–1895), businessman and member of the Pennsylvania House of Representatives
- Tom Patton (born 1935), Major League Baseball catcher
- Jim Spotts (1909–1964), Major League Baseball catcher
- J. C. Wenger (1910–1995), Mennonite theologian and professor
