= Oxford, Pennsylvania =

Borough in Pennsylvania, US

- Borough
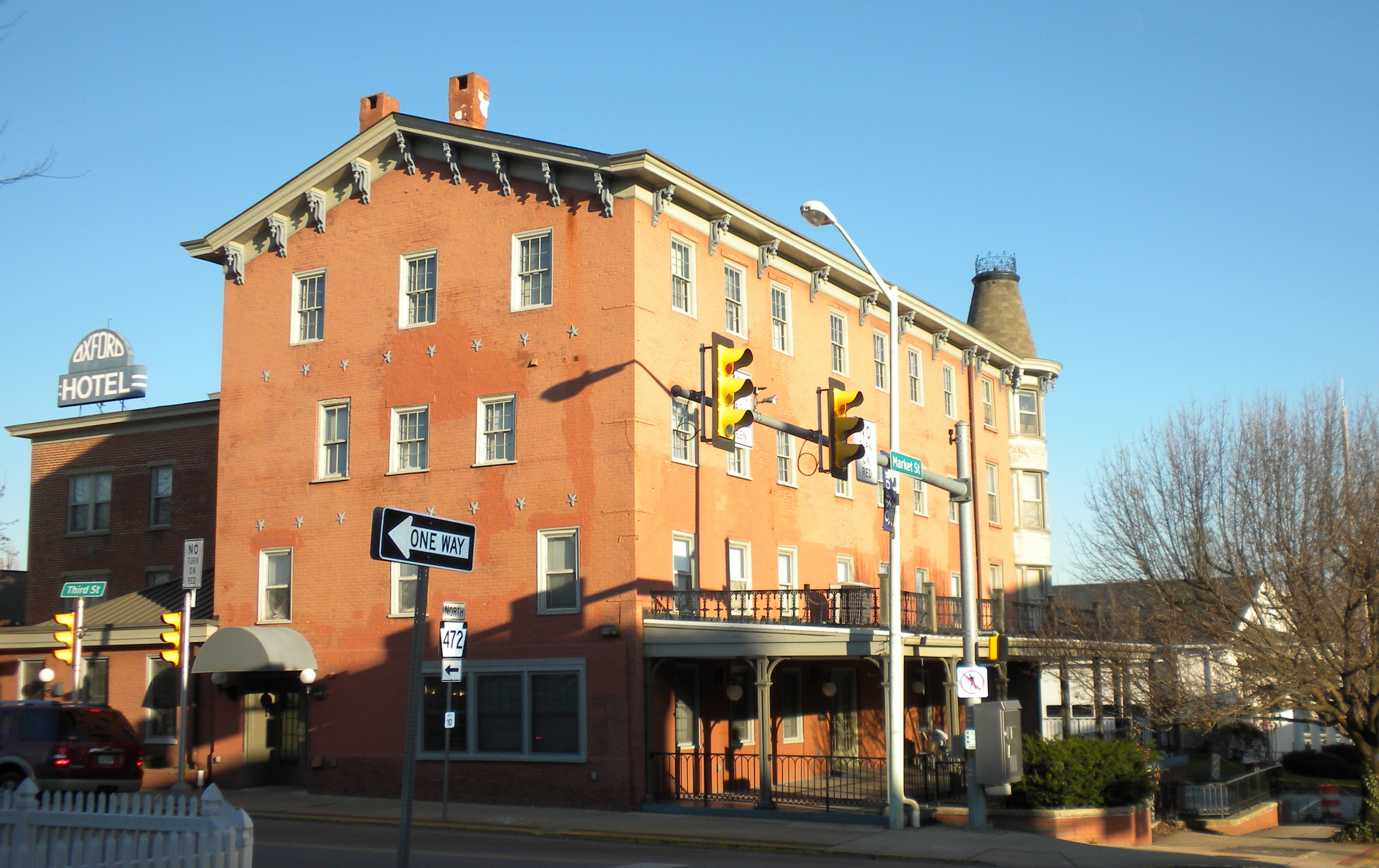
- Oxford Hotel

- Location in Chester County and the U.S. state of Pennsylvania.

- Location of Oxford in Pennsylvania Oxford (the United States)
- Coordinates: 39°47′02″N 75°58′42″W
- Country: United States
- State: Pennsylvania
- County: Chester
- Incorporated: 1833

Area
  - Total: 1.97 sq mi (5.09 km^{2})
  - Land: 1.96 sq mi (5.08 km^{2})
  - Water: 0.0039 sq mi (0.01 km^{2})
- Elevation: 535 ft (163 m)

Population (2020)
  - Total: 5,736
  - Density: 2,922.1/sq mi (1,128.24/km^{2})
- Time zone: UTC-5 (EST)
  - Summer (DST): UTC-4 (EDT)
- ZIP Code: 19363
- Area codes: 610 and 484
- FIPS code: 42-57480
- Website: www.oxfordboro.org

Oxford is a borough in Chester County, Pennsylvania, United States. Oxford is the closest town to Lincoln University. The population was 5,733 at the 2020 census.

== History ==
The borough was once called Oxford Crossing and Oxford Village during the 1700s.

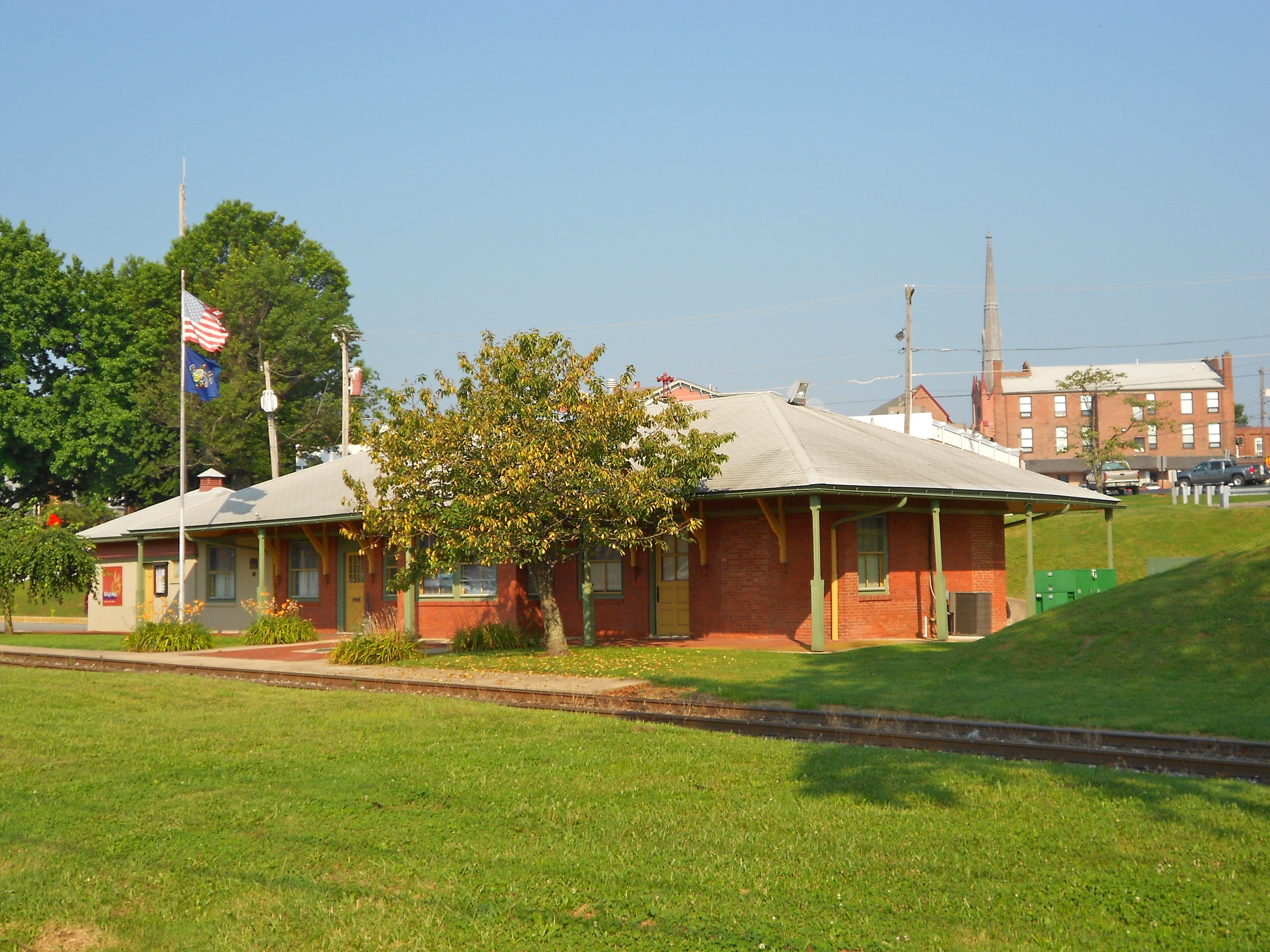
Borough Hall in the old train station

In 1805, the Oxford post office was established. In 1833, Oxford was officially incorporated as a borough. Its first burgess (now called the mayor) was Thomas Alexander, who operated a general store thought to be the oldest building in Oxford.

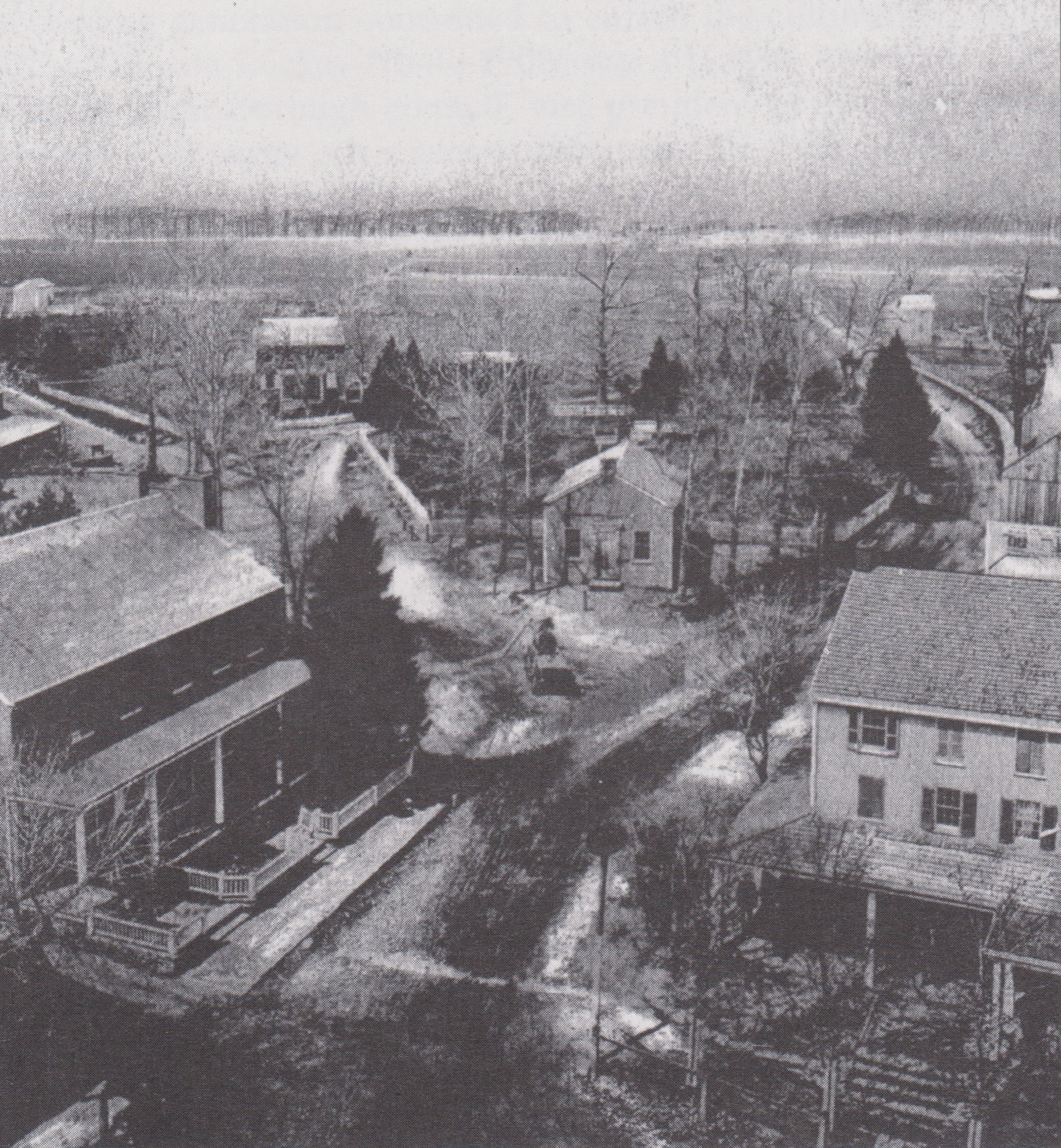
Intersection of Market St (Bottom Right) 3rd Street, (Center) and Pine St (Center Left) Oxford, PA. 1860's

The northern half of Oxford was owned by the Dickey family in the 19th century. The Dickeys included the local Presbyterian minister, the Mr O'Malley of the local bank, a state Representative, and local businessmen. Reverend John Miller Dickey and his wife Sarah Emlen Cresson founded Ashmun Institute in 1854, and which later became Lincoln University. Hinsonville, Pennsylvania was a former municipality and free black farming community just outside of Oxford and Lincoln University, It's proximity to the Mason–Dixon line was a strategic location in helping enslaved people reach safer territories, the Hosanna Meeting House at Lincoln University was a crucial part of the Underground Railroad. The Dickey family played a major role in re-routing the new Philadelphia and Baltimore Central Railroad (P&BC) through Oxford. Track was laid in the 1850s. The railroad reached Oxford in 1860 and later connected to Philadelphia and Baltimore. By the time of the Civil War, Oxford was a bustling community. The business district on Third Street was entirely re-built at this time, including the Oxford Hotel (1858) and Oxford Hall (1862). Oxford became known for its confectionery and candy businesses and was the location of many manufacturing facilities. A second railroad, the Peach Bottom Railway, was built in the 1870s from Oxford to Peach Bottom. It carried farm products and passengers but was not profitable. It struggled through three bankruptcies and reorganized as the Lancaster, Oxford and Southern Railway, finally closing permanently in 1918.

The Pennsylvania Railroad took control of the P&BC on the eve of World War I. Passenger train service on the line ended in 1935. In the late 20th century, transportation changes resulted in Oxford being located off the main roads. A bypass was constructed for U.S. Route 1 in the late 1960s, but the major change was the 1963 opening of Interstate 95, which shifted the bulk of the Philadelphia-Baltimore traffic away from Oxford. The former Pennsylvania Railroad Station is now the borough hall.

The Oxford Historic District and Oxford Hotel were listed on the National Register of Historic Places in 2008.

== Geography ==
According to the United States Census Bureau, the borough has a total area of 1.97 square miles (5.1 km^{2}), all land. The population per square mile is 2,581.1.

== Demographics ==
Historical population
Census	Pop.	Note	%±
1850	186		—
1860	482		159.1%
1870	1,151		138.8%
1880	1,502		30.5%
1890	1,711		13.9%
1900	2,032		18.8%
1910	2,390		17.6%
1920	2,093		−12.4%
1930	2,606		24.5%
1940	2,723		4.5%
1950	3,091		13.5%
1960	3,376		9.2%
1970	3,658		8.4%
1980	3,633		−0.7%
1990	3,769		3.7%
2000	4,315		14.5%
2010	5,077		17.7%
2020	5,736		13.0%
2021 (est.)	5,737	▲	0.0%

At the 2010 census, the borough was 59.9% non-Hispanic White, 9.0% Black or African American, 0.4% Native American, 0.8% Asian, 0.1% Native Hawaiian or Pacific Islander, and 4.0% were two or more races. 28.8% of the population were of Hispanic or Latino ancestry. 693 people in the borough were foreign born.

As of the census of 2000, there were 4,315 people, 1,703 households, and 1,047 families residing in the borough. The population density was 2,254.6 inhabitants per square mile (870.5/km^{2}). There were 1,825 housing units at an average density of 953.6 per square mile (368.2/km^{2}). The racial makeup of the borough was 77.75% White, 11.87% African American, 0.09% Native American, 0.63% Asian, 0.23% Pacific Islander, 7.39% from other races, and 2.04% from two or more races. Hispanic or Latino of any race were 16.15% of the population.

There were 1,703 households, out of which 30.5% had children under the age of 18 living with them, 42.8% were married couples living together, 14.0% had a female householder with no husband present, and 38.5% were non-families. 33.6% of all households were made up of individuals, and 17.1% had someone living alone who was 65 years of age or older. The average household size was 2.65 and the average family size was 3.15.

In the borough the population was spread out, with 25.6% under the age of 18, 9.1% from 18 to 24, 26.5% from 25 to 44, 19.0% from 45 to 64, and 19.8% who were 65 years of age or older. The median age was 35.5 years. For every 100 females there were 85.3 males. For every 100 females age 18 and over, there were 78.0 males.

The median income for a household in the borough was $49,896, and the median income for a family was $41,172. Males had a median income of $35,398 versus $23,015 for females. The per capita income for the borough was $21,924. About 22.6% of the population were below the poverty line, including 15.3% of those under age 18 and 12.9% of those age 65 or over.

As of 2012, there was a total of 264 business firms located in the borough.

== Points of interest ==
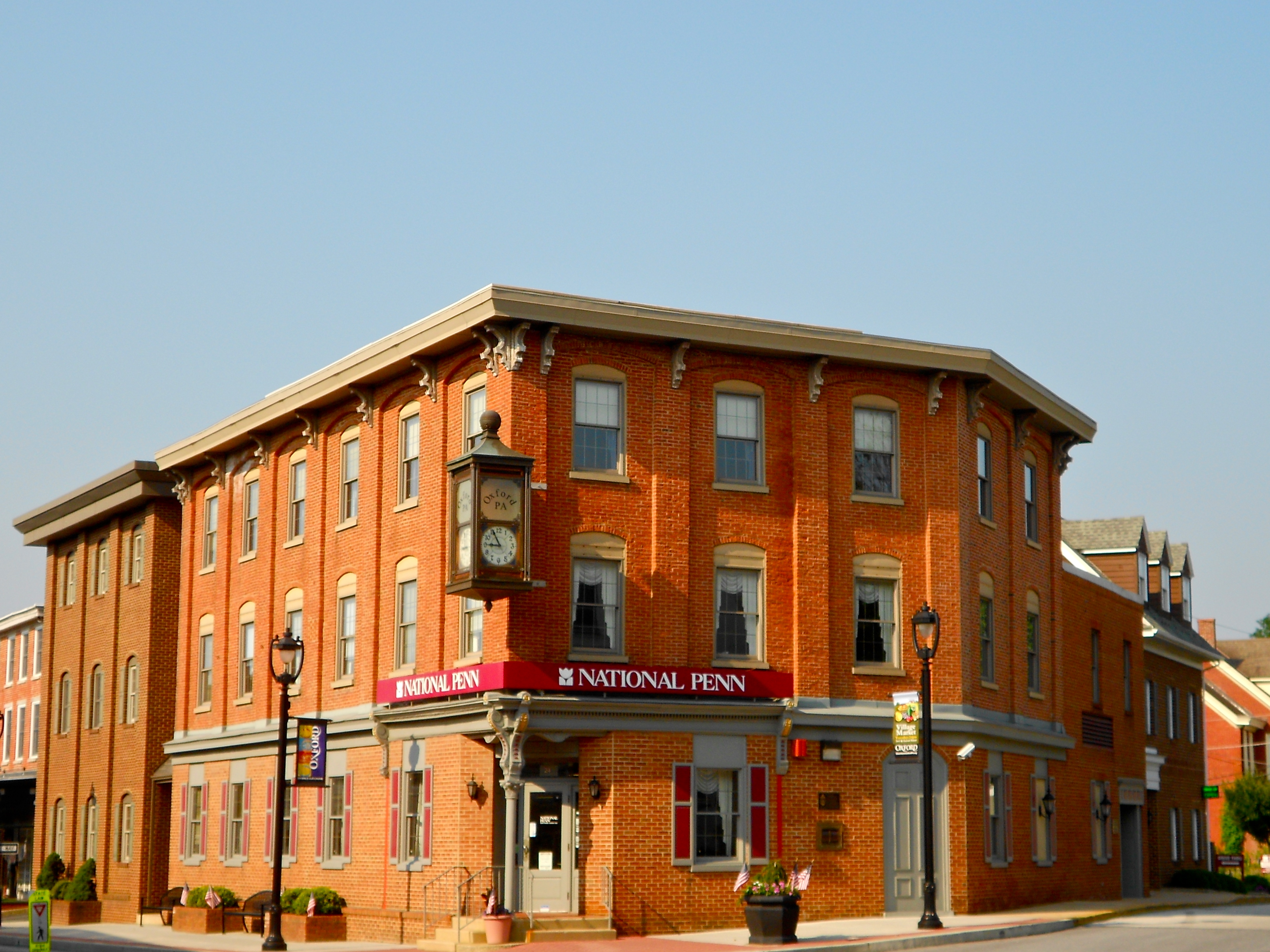
Town clock on the BB&T Bank

The Oxford Town Clock, on the BB&T bank on South Third Street, was restored in May 2001. The Fire House located right off of Market Street was originally the Dickey Building, but was renovated and named the Union Fire Company No. 1. They are still in this location today.

The Oxford Presbyterian Church, one of the oldest buildings in town, was destroyed by fire in 1989 after the steeple (which it was known for and can be seen for miles) was struck by lightning. It has been rebuilt and is still in use today.

Oxford has built a four-story parking garage in the middle of the borough. The borough office will also be moved to the first floor of the garage. The borough intends to bring in more people into the town with this new addition.

== Education ==
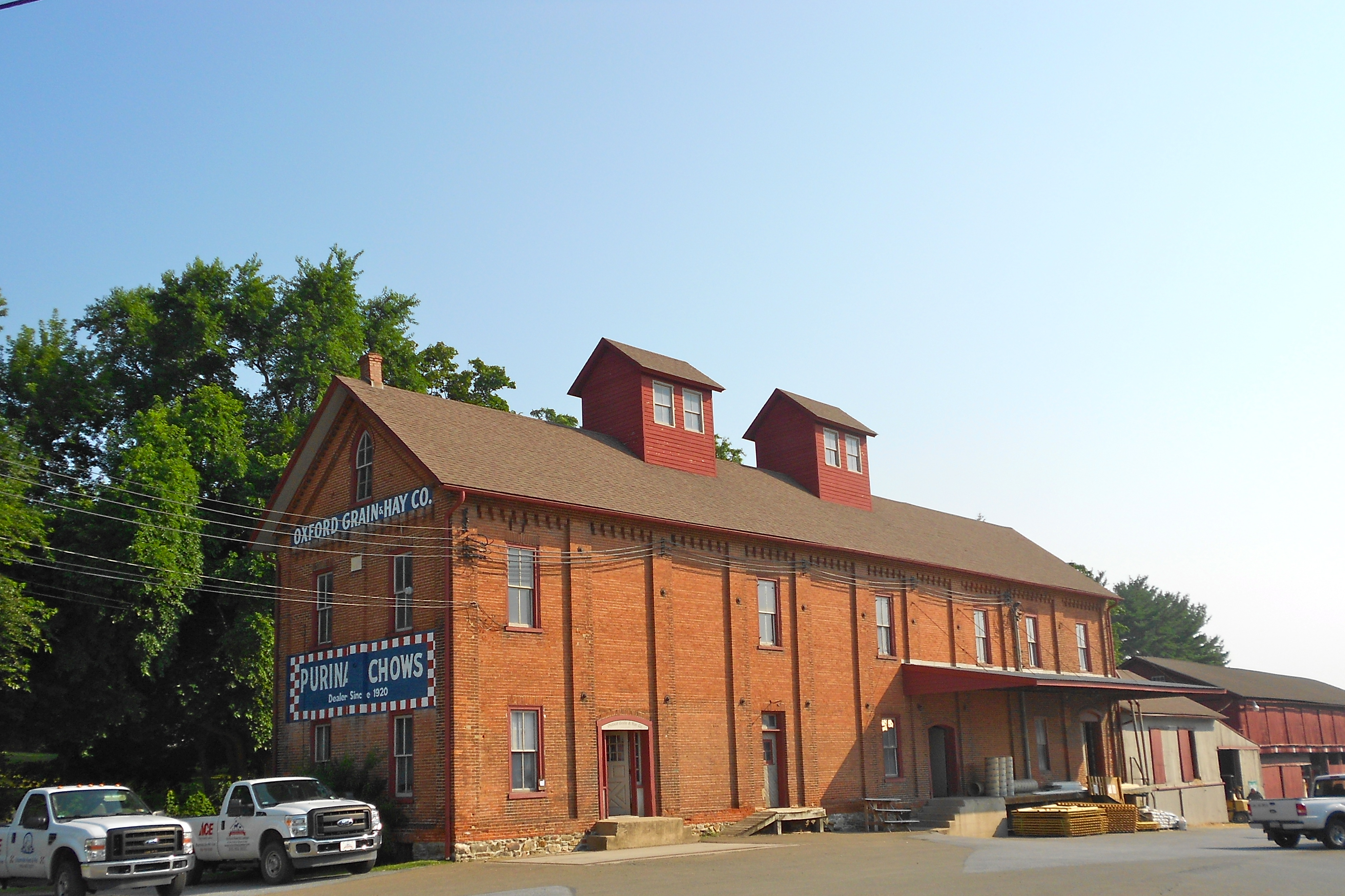
Oxford Grain and Hay

The local public school district is the Oxford Area School District. There are six schools associated with the district: Jordan Bank Elementary (K), Elk Ridge Elementary (1-2), Nottingham Elementary (3-4), Hopewell Elementary (5-6), Penn's Grove Middle School (7-8), and Oxford Area High School (9-12). Penn's Grove Middle was the original location of the High School, but became Penn's Grove after the new High School building was completed in November 2005, (the new place is located down Waterway Road). Oxford Area High School was in the borough but since 2005 is in East Nottingham Township.

Sacred Heart School is also located in Oxford, which was built in 2002, and is run by the Archdiocese of Philadelphia.

Oxford is a part of the American Division in the Ches-Mont League for high school sports. Sports included are football, basketball, baseball, soccer, field hockey, swimming, lacrosse, wrestling, tennis, and golf.

Oxford is the closest borough to Lincoln University, a historically black college that was founded in 1854. People such as Langston Hughes and Thurgood Marshall were students at Lincoln University.

== Transportation ==
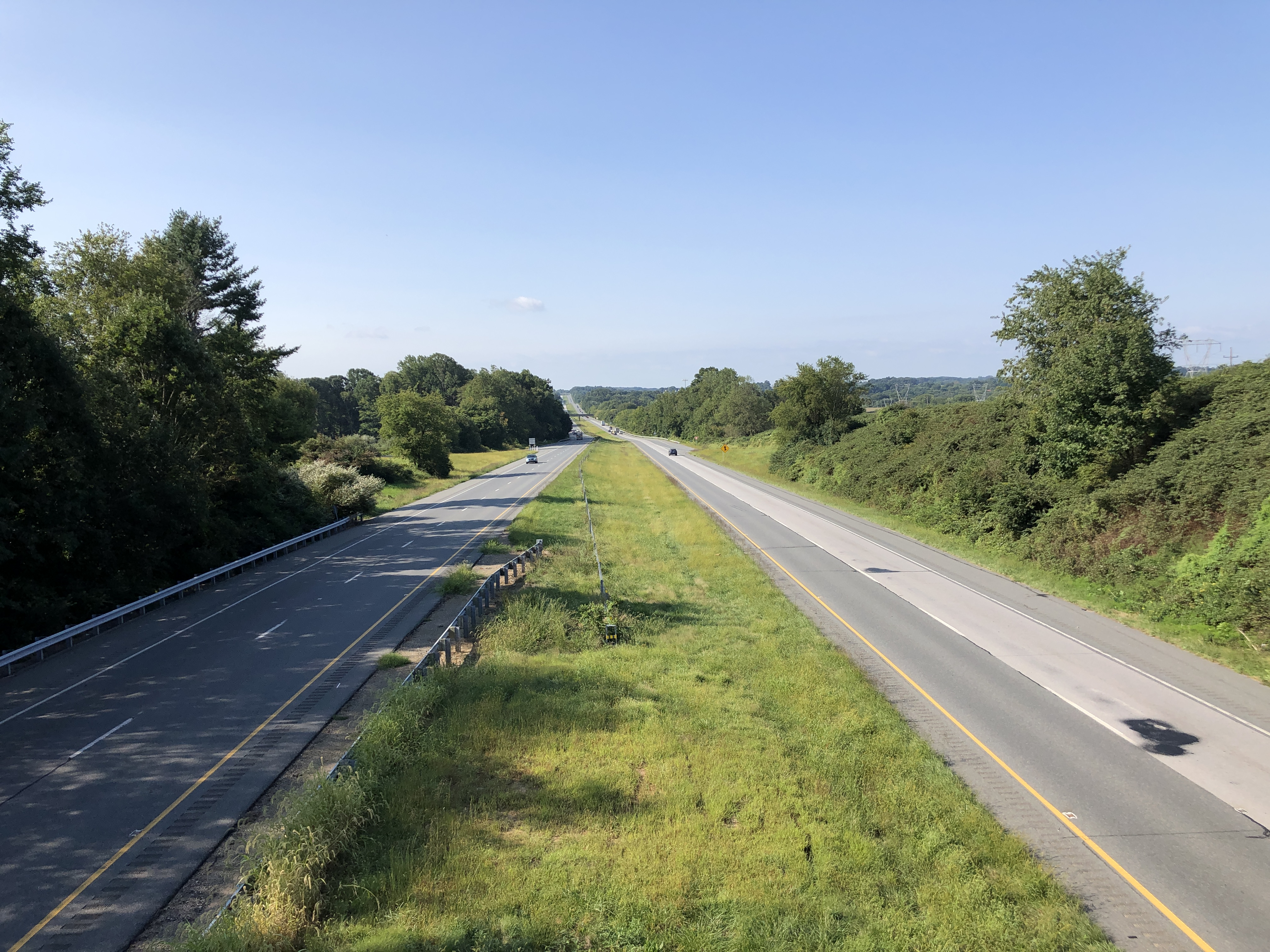
US 1 southbound in Oxford

As of 2020, there were 18.32 miles (29.48 km) of public roads in Oxford, of which 6.88 miles (11.07 km) were maintained by Pennsylvania Department of Transportation (PennDOT) and 11.44 miles (18.41 km) were maintained by the borough.

U.S. Route 1 is the main highway serving Oxford. It follows the Kennett-Oxford Bypass along a southwest-to-northeast alignment across the northwestern edge of the borough. Pennsylvania Route 472 mostly follows Lancaster Avenue and Market Street on an east–west alignment through the center of town, while Pennsylvania Route 10 begins at PA 472 in the center of town and follows Third Street north.

== Notable people ==
- William T. Fulton (1835–1912), lawyer and a member of the Pennsylvania House of Representatives
- Scott Holmes (born 1952), actor
- John H. Ware III (1908–1997), burgess of Oxford and U.S. House Representative from Pennsylvania
