= Lewis H. Evans =

American politician (1832–1904)

Member of the Pennsylvania House of Representatives from the Chester County district
- In office 1889–1890 Serving with John W. Hickman, William W. McConnell, D. Smith Talbot
- Preceded by: William Evans
- In office 1887–1888
- Preceded by: William W. McConnell, John W. Hickman, D. Smith Talbot
- Succeeded by: William Evans

Personal details
- Born: July 1, 1832 Upper Uwchlan Township, Pennsylvania, U.S.
- Died: February 7, 1904 (aged 71) near Phoenixville, Pennsylvania, U.S.
- Resting place: Saint Paul Lutheran Church Cemetery; Exton, Pennsylvania, U.S.
- Party: Republican
- Relatives: Evan Evans
- Occupation: Politician; farmer

Lewis H. Evans (July 1, 1832 – February 7, 1904) was an American politician from Pennsylvania. He served as a member of the Pennsylvania House of Representatives, representing Chester County from 1887 to 1888 and from 1889 to 1890.

== Early life ==
Lewis H. Evans was born on July 1, 1832, in Upper Uwchlan Township, Pennsylvania, to Eleanor (née Beitler) and Ezekiel Evans. His father was a farmer, raised stock and served as justice of the peace. His grandfather Evan Evans was a Pennsylvania state legislator. He studied in common schools and studied under Professor Gause's Seminary in Marshallton.

== Career ==
After leaving school, Evans worked as a farmer until 1861. On June 6, 1861, he enlisted as a non-commissioned officer of Company K of the 4th Pennsylvania Reserve Regiment. He was promoted to first lieutenant of his company in 1862. He served until July 17, 1864. He was shot and wounded in his arm at the Battle of Cloyd's Mountain of the Civil War. He was commissioned by Governor John W. Geary after the war as captain.

After returning from the war, Evans bought a farm in Lancaster County. He farmed there for three years before moving back to Upper Uwchlan Township. He bought a 145 acres (59 ha) farm there.

Evans was a Republican. In 1872, he was elected register of wills of Chester County. He served in that role for three years. He served as a member of the Pennsylvania House of Representatives, representing Chester County from 1887 to 1888 and from 1889 to 1890. He also served as justice of the peace. He was a member of the forestry commission and was a charter member and secretary of the Fairmount Creamery Association of Uwchlan Township.

== Personal life ==
Evans died of heart trouble on a train leaving Phoenixville on February 7, 1904. He was buried in Saint Paul Lutheran Church Cemetery in Exton.
