= George Fairlamb Smith =

American soldier and politician (1840–1877)

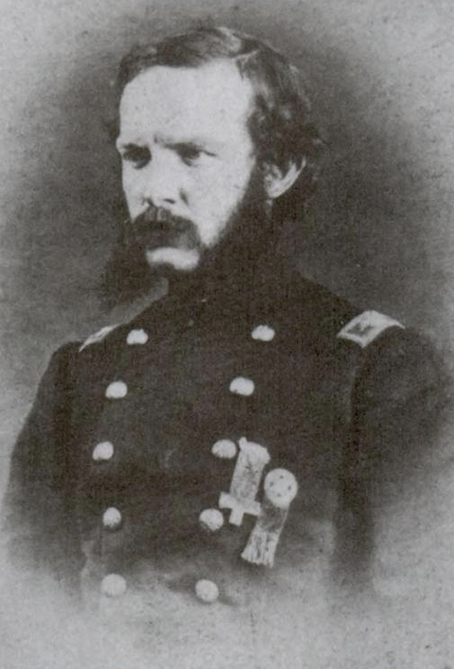
- Smith, c. 1864
- Born: February 28, 1840; West Chester, Pennsylvania, U.S.
- Died: October 18, 1877 (aged 37); West Chester, Pennsylvania, U.S.
- Burial place: Oaklands Cemetery; West Goshen Township, Pennsylvania, U.S.
- Education: Yale University (BA, MA)
- Spouse: Anne E. Hickman (m. 1867)
- Children: 2
- Relatives: Persifor Frazer Smith (father)
- Military career
- Allegiance: United States (Union)
- Branch: U.S. Army (Union Army)
- Service years: 1861–1865
- Rank: Colonel
- Commands: 61st Pennsylvania Infantry Regiment
- Conflicts: American Civil War; Battle of Fair Oaks (WIA), (POW); Second Battle of Fredericksburg; Battle of Gettysburg; Battle of Spotsylvania Court House (WIA)
- Other work: Politician; lawyer

George Fairlamb Smith (February 28, 1840 – October 18, 1877) was an American soldier, politician, and lawyer from West Chester, Pennsylvania. He was wounded twice and captured during the American Civil War, ending the war with the rank of colonel in command of the 61st Pennsylvania Infantry Regiment in the Union Army. He went on to serve in the Pennsylvania House of Representatives in 1875–76 and as judge advocate general of the Pennsylvania National Guard in 1877.

== Early life and education ==
George Fairlamb Smith was born in West Chester, Pennsylvania, on February 28, 1840, to Thomasine Susan (née Fairlamb) and Persifor Frazer Smith. His father was a state legislator and lawyer. Smith received his preparatory education at the West Chester Academy and received his Bachelor of Arts degree with honors from Yale University in 1858. He read law under his father until enlisting in the Union Army upon the outbreak of the American Civil War in April 1861. While recuperating from wounds received in battle in May 1864, he went on to receive his Master of Arts degree from Yale University in 1864 and gained admittance to the bar on October 31, 1864. After the war, he joined his father's law practice in West Chester.

== American Civil War ==
When President Abraham Lincoln issued his call for 75,000 three-month volunteers to suppress Southern secession, Smith was one of the first men to volunteer from Chester County. On April 20, 1861, he enlisted as a private in Company G of the 2nd Pennsylvania Infantry Regiment and soon afterward became first lieutenant and regimental quartermaster, mustering out on schedule on July 26, 1861. He returned home to raise a company for three years' service, receiving a commission as captain of Company B of the 49th Pennsylvania Infantry Regiment on August 2, 1861. He resigned this commission to rise to the rank of major of the 61st Pennsylvania Infantry Regiment effective March 14, 1862. All these regiments deployed in the Army of the Potomac and fought mostly in Virginia.

On May 31, 1862, Smith was wounded and captured at the Battle of Fair Oaks on May 31, 1862. The Confederates held him as a prisoner of war, first at Libby Prison for a week and then for three months at a prison camp in Salisbury, North Carolina. He was paroled on September 10, 1862. He found that he had become the commanding officer of his regiment, both his superior officers having been killed during the Peninsula campaign. Promoted to lieutenant colonel on June 1, 1862, and colonel on March 21, 1864, Smith commanded the 61st Regiment for the remainder of his wartime service. This regiment was engaged in most of the battles fought by the Army of the Potomac, including the Battle of Gettysburg in July 1863, where the regiment repulsed repeated Confederate assaults. Smith received a temporary discharge for disability on April 23, 1863, due to typhoid fever and/or dysentery, returning to his regiment on May 4. Smith distinguished himself in the storming of Marye's Heights during the Second Battle of Fredericksburg in May 1863.

Smith was twice wounded, including a serious injury to the lower leg, while attacking Confederate positions at the so-called Bloody Angle during the Battle of Spotsylvania Court House on May 12, 1864. He was sent home to recuperate and mustered out on September 7, 1864, at the termination of his three-year enlistment. He was recommissioned as colonel of the same regiment on September 29, 1864, and was honorably discharged by special order on April 20, 1865, near the war's end.

Smith received praise from his commanding officers. General Albion P. Howe, commander of Smith's division, commented that "he showed himself at all times an efficient, gallant, and competent officer," while corps commander General John Sedgwick observed that "he has performed his duty with zeal and ability."

== Later life ==
After completing his military service, Smith joined his father in the practice of law from 1865 until his death. Elected Chester County District Attorney, he served from 1869 to 1872. He was elected to the Pennsylvania House of Representatives as a Republican for the 1875 and 1876 terms but opted not run for reelection for 1877. Also in 1877, Governor John F. Hartranft appointed him to the governor's staff as judge advocate general of the Pennsylvania National Guard, with the rank of brigadier general. Since 1875, Smith had served as an aide to the governor, with the rank of colonel. Hartranft also appointed him to serve on a commission to select a site to build an insane asylum for Chester, Bucks, Delaware, and Montgomery counties. Smith was elected to the Military Order of the Loyal Legion of the United States on February 6, 1867.

Smith married Anne E. Hickman, daughter of Wellington Hickman and Jane Osborne Hickman, on September 25, 1867. The couple had one son and one daughter. Smith died on October 18, 1877, in West Chester after a "short but painful illness". His remains were interred at Oaklands Cemetery in West Goshen Township.
