= Pennypacker =

Pennypacker may refer to:

== People ==
- Carlton R. Pennypacker, astrophysicist
- Elijah F. Pennypacker (1804–1888), American politician and abolitionist from Pennsylvania
- Galusha Pennypacker (c. 1841–1916), Union general during the American Civil War
- Matthias Pennypacker (1786–1852), American politician from Pennsylvania
- Matthias J. Pennypacker (1819–1899), American politician from Pennsylvania
- Morton Pennypacker (1872–1956), American author and historian
- Nathan A. Pennypacker (1835–1886), American politician from Pennsylvania
- Samuel W. Pennypacker (1843–1916), American politician from Pennsylvania
- Sara Pennypacker (fl. 2006–2019), American author of children’s literature
- Rebecca Lane Pennypacker Price (1837–1919), American nurse during the American Civil War

== Places ==
- Pennybacker Bridge, Austin, Texas
- Pennypacker Mills, a colonial revival mansion in Schwenksville, Pennsylvania
- Pennypacker Hall, a dormitory at Harvard University

== In fiction ==
- H. E. Pennypacker, alias of Cosmo Kramer on Seinfeld
- Mrs. Pennypacker, a puppet character on Today's Special
- The Remarkable Mr. Pennypacker, a 1959 American film

== See also ==
- Pennybacker (disambiguation)
- Pennypack (disambiguation)
