= Thomas Bull =

Thomas Bull may refer to:

- Thomas Bull (settler) (c. 1605–1684), early settler in the Connecticut Colony, one of the founders of Hartford, Connecticut
- Thomas Bull (Pennsylvania politician) (1744–1837), member of the Pennsylvania House of Representatives,
- Thomas K. Bull (1810–1893), member of the Pennsylvania House of Representatives
- Thomas Short Bull (born 1946), member of the South Dakota Senate
- Thomas Bull (judge), Swedish jurist
- Tom Bull (1905–1976), Australian politician
