= Andrew Buchanan =

Andrew Buchanan may refer to:

- Andrew Buchanan of Drumpellier (1690–1759), tobacco lord and Lord Provost of Glasgow, 1740–1742
- Andrew Buchanan (American politician) (1780–1848), US Representative from Pennsylvania
- Andrew Buchanan (Pennsylvania state representative) (fl. 1856), American politician from Pennsylvania
- Andrew Buchanan (surgeon) (1798–1882), first Regius Professor of Physiology at the University of Glasgow
- Andrew Buchanan (New Zealand politician) (1806–1877), member of the New Zealand Legislative Council
- Sir Andrew Buchanan, 1st Baronet (1807–1882), British diplomat
- Sir Andrew Buchanan, 5th Baronet (born 1937), owner of Hodsock Priory and Lord Lieutenant of Nottinghamshire
- Andrew Buchanan (figure skater), British figure skater
- Drew Buchanan, fictional character in the American soap opera One Life to Live

== See also ==
- Andrew Buchan (born 1979), English actor
