= Persifor =

Persifor is a given name. Notable people with the name include:

- Persifor Frazer (1736–1792), American soldier and industrialist
- Persifor Frazer Smith (1798–1858), American military officer
- Persifor Frazer Smith (politician) (1808–1882), American politician and lawyer
