= John Hickman (Pennsylvania politician) =

American politician (1810–1875)

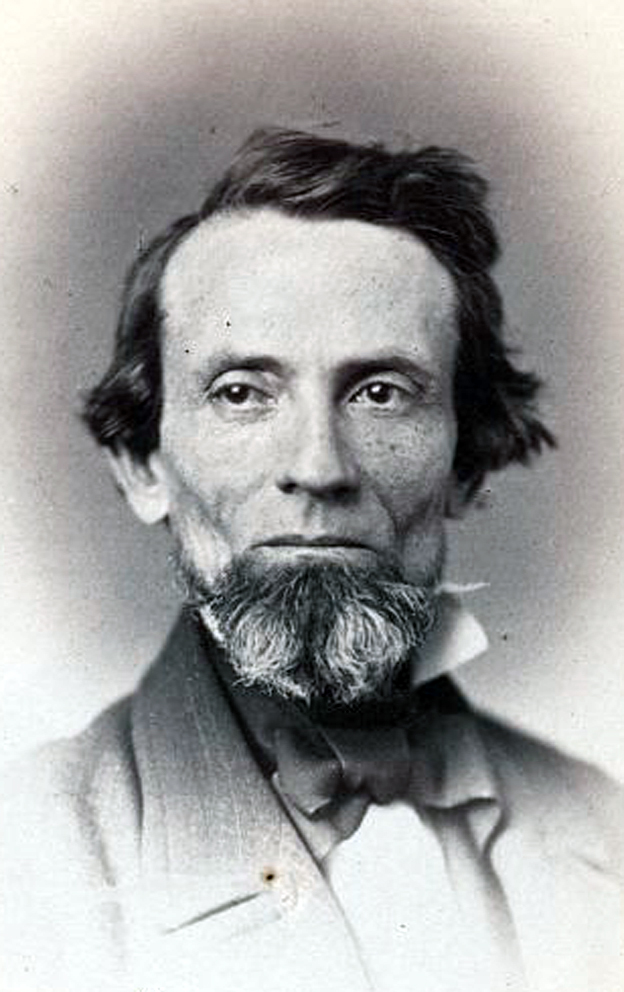
- Hickman in 1859

Member of the Pennsylvania House of Representatives from the Chester County district
- In office 1868–1868 Serving with James M. Phillips and Stephen M. Meredith
- Preceded by: William Bell Waddell, Nathan J. Sharpless, Nathan A. Pennypacker
- Succeeded by: James M. Phillips, Stephen M. Meredith, Archimedes Robb

Member of the U.S. House of Representatives from Pennsylvania's 6th district
- In office March 4, 1855 – March 3, 1863
- Preceded by: William Everhart
- Succeeded by: John Dodson Stiles

Personal details
- Born: September 11, 1810 West Bradford Township, Pennsylvania, U.S.
- Died: March 23, 1875 (aged 64) West Chester, Pennsylvania, U.S.
- Resting place: Oaklands Cemetery
- Party: Democratic; Anti-Lecompton Democratic; Republican
- Occupation: Politician; lawyer
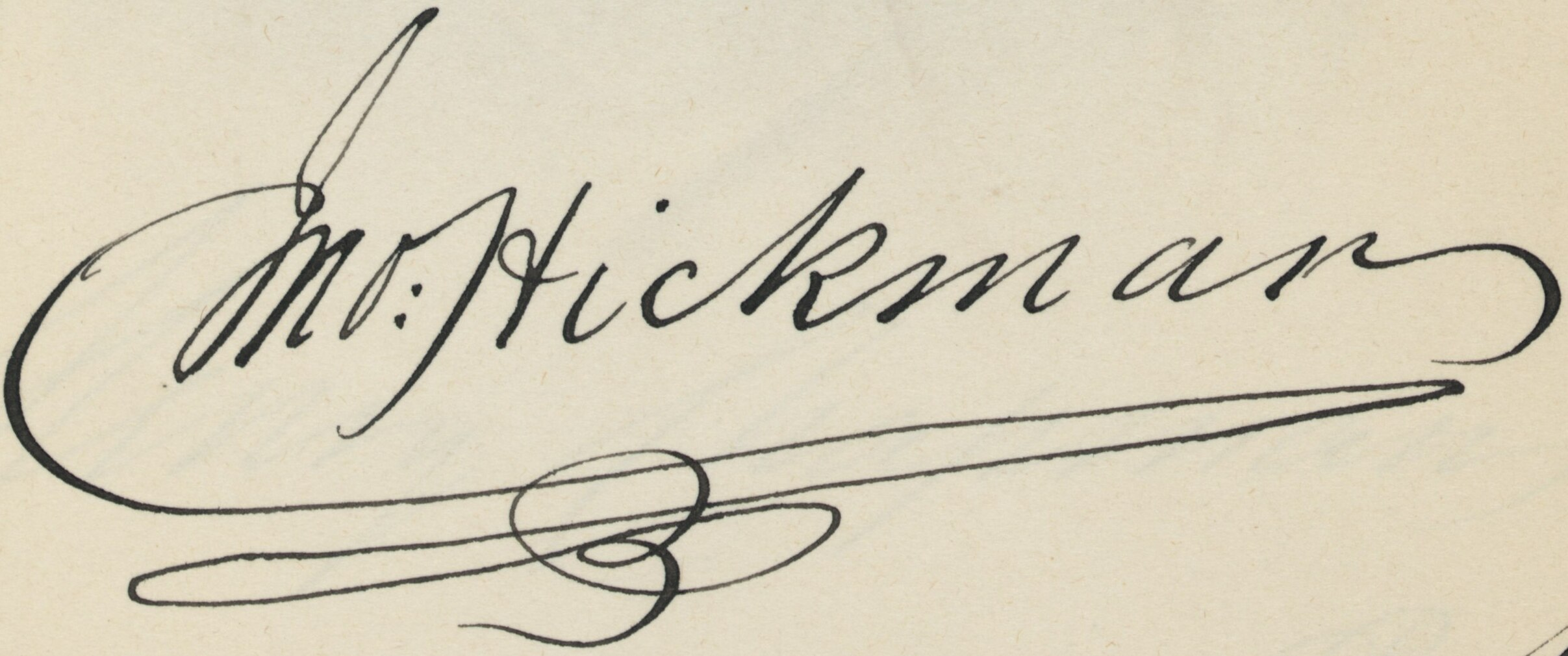
- Signature

John Hickman (September 11, 1810 – March 23, 1875) was a Republican, Democratic and Anti-Lecompton Democratic member of the U.S. House of Representatives for Pennsylvania's 6th congressional district from 1855 to 1863.

== Early life ==
John Hickman was born on September 11, 1810, in West Bradford Township, Pennsylvania. His father was a farmer. Hickman was taught English and classical studies by private tutors. He began studying medicine but abandoned it for the study of law. He studied law under Townsend Haines and was admitted to the bar in 1832 or 1833.

== Career ==
=== Early career ===
Hickman commenced practice in West Chester. He was a delegate to the Democratic convention at Baltimore in 1844. He served as district attorney for Chester County, in 1845 and 1846.

=== United States House of Representatives ===
Hickman was elected as a Democrat to the Thirty-fourth and Thirty-fifth Congresses, as an Anti-Lecompton Democrat to the Thirty-sixth Congress, and as a Republican to the Thirty-seventh Congress. He served as chairman of the United States House Committee on Revolutionary Pensions during the Thirty-fifth Congress and the United States House Committee on the Judiciary during the Thirty-sixth and Thirty-seventh Congresses. At the 1860 Republican National Convention, Hickman finished 3rd in the race for the vice-presidential nomination, behind Hannibal Hamlin and Cassius Clay.

At a political dinner in Philadelphia a week after South Carolina declared secession from the Union, Hickman made a fiery speech calling for war, reported on the front page of the Philadelphia Inquirer on December 29, 1860:

The time for action has arrived; every man must define his position; there is an eternal conflict between freedom and slavery; truces which will last cannot be formed between them. . . . You must now make up your minds whether to serve God or Belial. (Cheers.) . . . For myself I say distinctly — No more compromises. (Long continued applause.) I love the Constitution and the Union, but I will not buy them from an enemy. (Cries of good.) . . . South Carolina is not out of the Union, and by the blessing of Almighty God she never will be out of the Union. (Uproarious cheers.) And if you believe as I do, she never will be out of the Union. (Cheers.) The eighteen millions of the North are not to be put down by the eight millions of the South. The prospect is indeed gloomy. We have a traitor President and a corrupt and rotten Cabinet. But with all the banded seceding States and their traitor friends, we will yet save the Union. (Cheers.) . . . The South thinks the North is craven, and our Union-saving merchants encourage that belief. I want to know whether every man is going to purchase a peace or defend the peace. (Cheers.)

He declined to be a candidate for renomination in 1862. He was one of the managers appointed by the House of Representatives in 1862 to conduct the impeachment proceedings against Tennessee judge West H. Humphreys. He was a delegate to the 1872 Liberal Republican convention in Cincinnati.

=== Later career ===
After his political career, Hickman resumed the practice of law and continued until 1875. He served as a Republican in the Pennsylvania House of Representatives, representing Chester County in 1868.

== Personal life ==
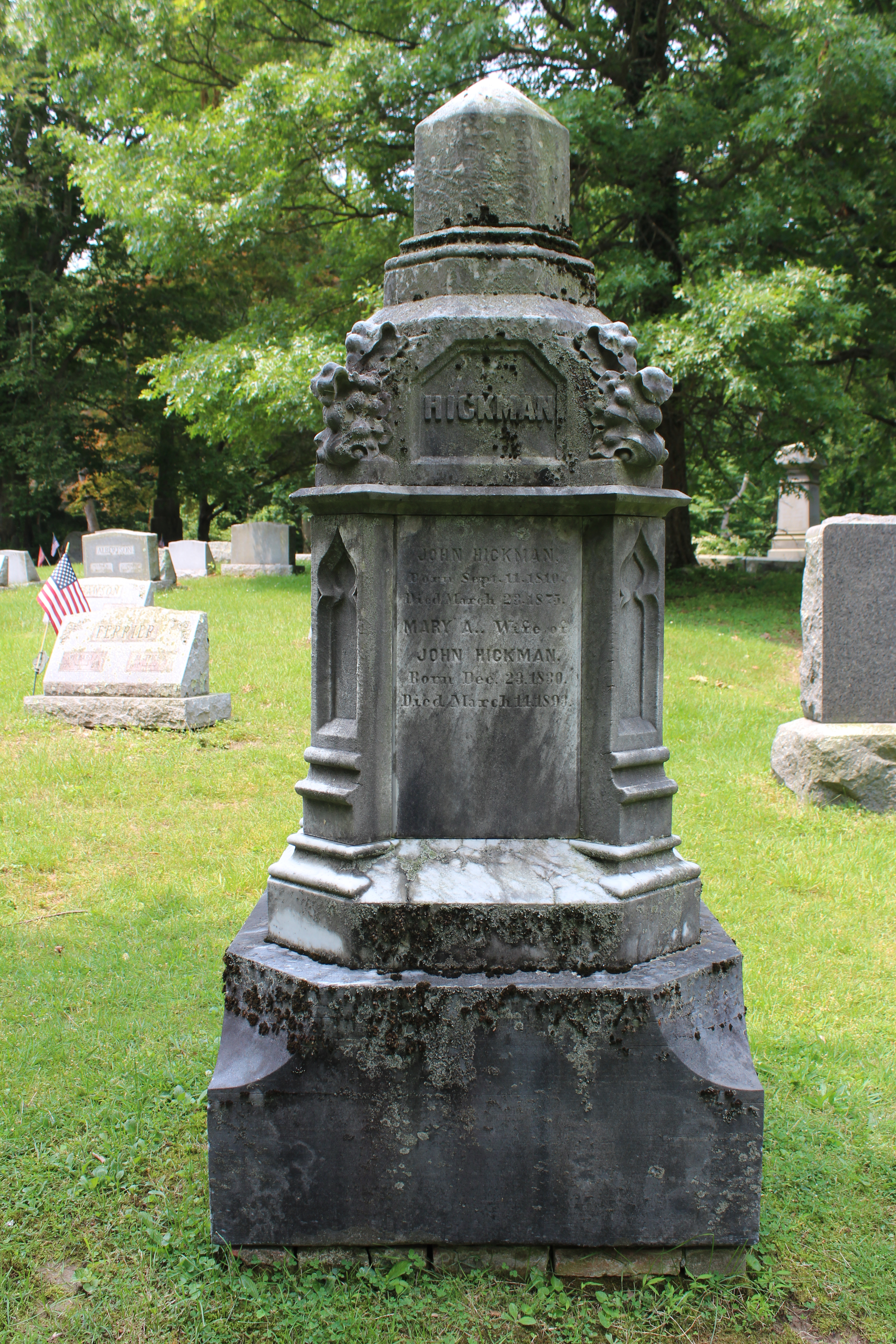
John Hickman grave in Oaklands Cemetery

Hickman married twice. He married the sister of General John W. Phelps. He was friends with Thaddeus Stevens.

Hickman died on March 23, 1875, at his home in West Chester. He was interred in Oaklands Cemetery.

== Sources ==
- United States Congress. "John Hickman (id: H000562)". Biographical Directory of the United States Congress.
- The Political Graveyard

U.S. House of Representatives
Preceded by William Everhart	Member of the U.S. House of Representatives from Pennsylvania's 6th congressional district 1855–1863	Succeeded by John D. Stiles
