= James C. Roberts (politician) =

American politician and businessman (1822–1872)

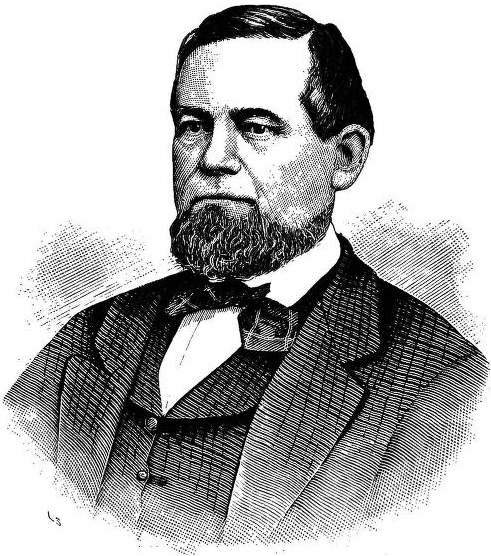
- Sketch of Roberts in an 1881 publication

Member of the Pennsylvania House of Representatives from the Chester County district
- In office 1870–1870 Serving with Abel Darlington and Joseph C. Keech
- Preceded by: James M. Phillips, Stephen M. Meredith, Archimedes Robb
- Succeeded by: Joseph C. Keech, Levi Prizer, Samuel H. Hoopes

Personal details
- Born: James Correlly Roberts; September 5, 1822 Pleasant Valley, Dutchess County, New York, U.S.
- Died: July 5, 1872 (aged 49) Chester County, Pennsylvania, U.S.
- Resting place: East Brandywine Baptist Church; Guthriesville, Chester County, Pennsylvania, U.S.
- Party: Republican
- Spouse: Asenath Kelly Reed (m. 1842)
- Children: 7
- Occupation: Politician; coal miner; businessman

James Correlly Roberts (September 5, 1822 – July 5, 1872) was an American politician and businessman from Pennsylvania. He served as a member of the Pennsylvania House of Representatives, representing Chester County in 1870.

== Early life ==
James Correlly Roberts was born on September 5, 1822, in Pleasant Valley, Dutchess County, New York. He attended school until the age of seven.

== Career ==
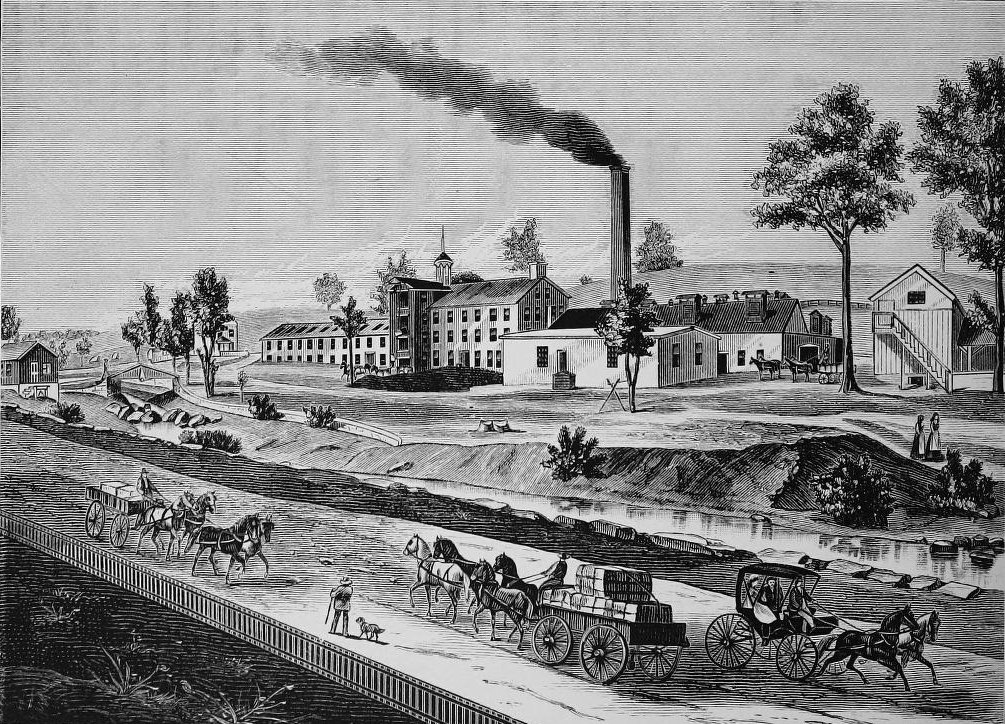
Drawing of Roberts's woolen mills near Downingtown

Around 1850, Roberts moved to Manayunk, Philadelphia. After two or three years, he moved to Dalton, Massachusetts, and lived there for about a year. He then returned to Manayunk and then moved to Fisherville, Dauphin County, Pennsylvania, and worked as a coal miner and became a manager. He then worked in the woolen mills and became an owner. He worked as a carder in a cotton mill.

Roberts was a Republican. In 1868, he was a delegate to the state convention. He served as a member of the Pennsylvania House of Representatives, representing Chester County in 1870.

== Personal life ==
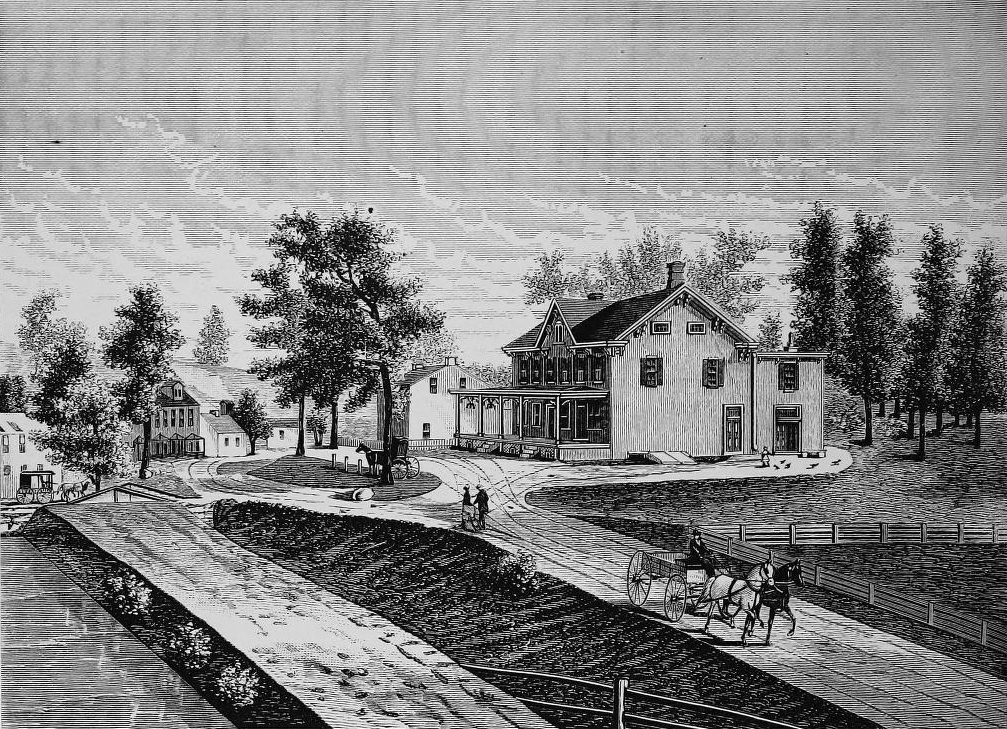
Drawing of Roberts's home in East Brandywine Township

Roberts married Asenath Kelly Reed of Framingham, Massachusetts, on September 5, 1842. They had seven children, George C., Josephine, Charles N., Edward D., James C. Jr., Anna Elizabeth and George B. M. He lived in East Brandywine Township.

Roberts died on July 5, 1872, in Chester County. He was interred at East Brandywine Baptist Church in Guthriesville, Chester County.
