= Joseph C. Keech =

American politician (1833–1915)

Member of the Pennsylvania House of Representatives from the Chester County district
- In office 1870–1872 Serving with James C. Roberts, Abel Darlington, Levi Prizer, Samuel H. Hoopes
- Preceded by: James M. Phillips, Stephen M. Meredith, Archimedes Robb
- Succeeded by: Levi Prizer and Elisha W. Baily

Personal details
- Born: May 5, 1833 Chester County, Pennsylvania, U.S.
- Died: March 24, 1915 (aged 81) West Chester, Pennsylvania, U.S.
- Resting place: Hephzibah Baptist Church Cemetery; Coatesville, Pennsylvania, U.S.
- Party: Republican
- Occupation: Politician; train conductor

Joseph C. Keech (May 5, 1833 – March 24, 1915) was an American politician from Pennsylvania. He served as a member of the Pennsylvania House of Representatives, representing Chester County from 1870 to 1872.

== Early life ==
Joseph C. Keech was born on May 5, 1833, in Chester County, Pennsylvania.

== Career ==
Keech was a conductor of the Pennsylvania Railroad.

Keech was a Republican. He served as a member of the Pennsylvania House of Representatives, representing Chester County from 1870 to 1872. In 1903, he ran for Pennsylvania Senate, but lost.

== Personal life ==
His daughter Jessie R. married John Rogers of Philadelphia. He lived in Coatesville.

Keech died of dropsy on March 24, 1915, at Homeopathic Hospital in West Chester. He was interred at Hephzibah Baptist Church Cemetery in Coatesville.
