= Levi Prizer =

American politician (1819–1875)

Member of the Pennsylvania House of Representatives from the Chester County district
- In office 1871–1873 Serving with Joseph C. Keech, Samuel H. Hoopes, Elisha W. Baily
- Preceded by: James C. Roberts, Abel Darlington, Joseph C. Keech
- Succeeded by: Elisha W. Baily, Peter G. Carey, John P. Edge, George Fairlamb Smith

Personal details
- Born: March 4, 1819
- Died: November 24, 1875 (aged 56)
- Resting place: Morris Cemetery; Phoenixville, Pennsylvania, U.S.
- Party: Republican
- Occupation: Politician; farmer; miller

Levi Prizer (March 4, 1819 – November 24, 1875) was an American politician from Pennsylvania. He served as a member of the Pennsylvania House of Representatives, representing Chester County from 1871 to 1873.

== Early life ==
Levi Prizer was born on March 4, 1819.

== Career ==
Prizer was a miller and farmer. He was justice of the peace for 20 years and was school director.

Prizer was a Republican. He served as a member of the Pennsylvania House of Representatives, representing Chester County from 1871 to 1873.

== Personal life ==
Prizer had a stroke in October 1875. He died on November 24, 1875, at his home in West Pikeland Township. He was interred at Morris Cemetery in Phoenixville.
