= Daily Local News =

Daily newspaper in Chester County, Pennsylvania, US

- Type: Daily newspaper
- Owner: Media News Group
- Founder: William H. Hodgson
- Founded: 1872
- Language: English
- Headquarters: Exton, Pennsylvania, U.S.
- ISSN: 0163-3082
- OCLC number: 2260094
- Website: dailylocal.com

The Daily Local News is a daily newspaper based in Chester County, Pennsylvania. The newspaper covers Chester County news and provides limited coverage of neighboring Lancaster and Delaware counties. It covers local and national news, sports, culture, and entertainment. The paper published its first issue in West Chester on November 19, 1872. The paper is owned by Digital First Media.

== History ==
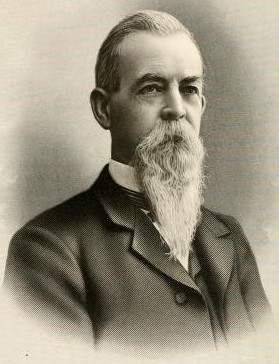
Portrait of William Hall Hodgson in a 1904 publication

Daily Local News was founded by William H. Hodgson, son of John Hodgson, who published The Jeffersonian, a West Chester weekly affiliated with the Democratic Party, from 1855 to 1910. The Daily Local News began as a proceedings of the Chester County Teachers' Institute but rapidly morphed into Chester County's first daily newspaper, gaining 800 subscribers by June 1873 and becoming the highest circulating daily outside Philadelphia. Circulation rose to 14,741 subscribers in 1904. Hodgson remained publisher through 1909, when the Daily Local News Company formed to manage the newspaper.

The Daily Local News continued to circulate briskly throughout the twentieth century, adding a Sunday edition in 1986. As of 2013, it had a daily circulation of more than 25,000 and a Sunday reach of more than 28,000. The newspaper downsized in 2017, relocating its headquarters to its printing plant in Uwchlan and selling the West Chester building that had housed the paper since 1970.

Humorist Dave Barry worked at the paper from 1971 to 1977, starting as a reporter and becoming news editor in 1975. He continued to write a weekly humor column until the mid-1980s. Barry met his second wife, Beth Lenox, while they were both reporters at the paper.
