= Robert E. Monaghan =

American politician (1822–1895)

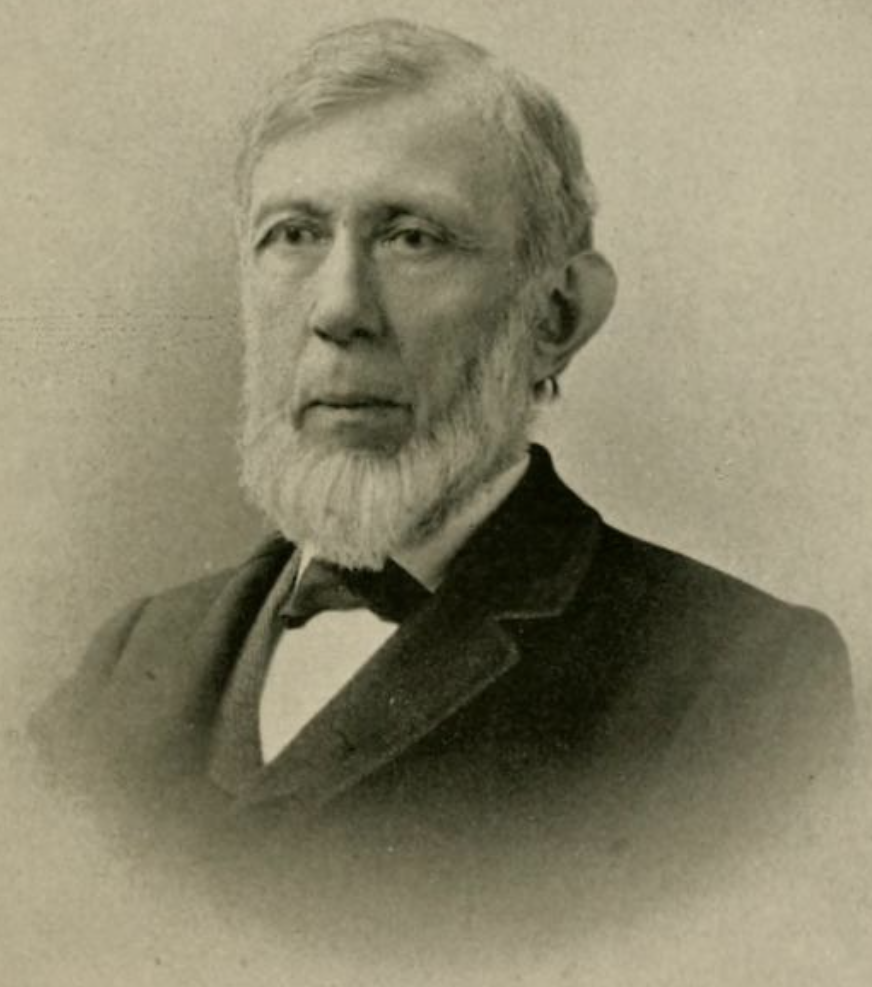
- Monaghan in a 1893 publication

Member of the Pennsylvania House of Representatives from the Chester County district
- In office 1853–1853 Serving with Henry T. Evans and William Wheeler
- Preceded by: William Chandler, Jesse James, Joseph Hickman
- Succeeded by: Matthias J. Pennypacker, Mark A. Hodgson, William R. Downing

Personal details
- Born: July 24, 1822 West Fallowfield Township, Chester County, Pennsylvania, U.S.
- Died: June 29, 1895 (aged 72) West Chester, Pennsylvania, U.S.
- Resting place: Oaklands Cemetery
- Party: Democratic
- Spouse: Rebecca Darlington Smith
- Children: 3
- Occupation: Politician; lawyer

Robert Emmet Monaghan (July 24, 1822 – June 29, 1895) was an American politician from Pennsylvania. He was a member of the Pennsylvania House of Representatives, representing Chester County in 1853.

== Early life ==
Robert Emmet Monaghan was born on July 24, 1822, on the family farm in West Fallowfield Township, Chester County, Pennsylvania, to Catharine (née Streeper) and James Monaghan. His father emigrated from Fermanagh, Ireland, and was involved in the revolution led by Robert Emmet. His father worked as a clerk, farmer, and was justice of the peace and a Democratic candidate of the state legislature. Monaghan studied in local schools and attended the Unionville Academy and the New London Academy in Chester County and the Strasburg Academy in Lancaster County. He read law under Hamilton Aldricks of Harrisburg.

== Career ==
Monaghan taught for a time and then worked as collector at the Pennsylvania canal in Liverpool for three years. He began practicing law in West Chester in the 1850s.

Monaghan was a Democrat. He was a member of the Pennsylvania House of Representatives, representing Chester County in 1853. He was chairman of the Democratic state conventions of 1876 and 1880. He was elector-at-large in 1880. He was a delegate to two national conventions, including the 1876 Democratic National Convention. He was a member of the Democratic State Central Committee. He was a member of the 34-person delegation in February 1861 sent from Harrisburg to Washington, D.C., to prevent the Civil War. In 1868, he was a candidate for U.S. Congress, but lost to Washington Townsend. He was nominated for district attorney of Chester County, but lost to Wayne MacVeagh. His name was once put forward by the Democratic State Convention as a candidate for governor. In 1891, he was a delegate-at-large for the proposed constitutional convention. In 1890, Governor James A. Beaver was appointed to a joint commission between the states of Pennsylvania and Delaware to settle and mark dividing lines between the states. He was appointed by Governor Robert E. Pattison, along with Charles R. Buckalew and Ovid F. Johnson for the "promotion of the uniformity of legislation in the United States". He ran for Pennsylvania Senate, but lost to William Preston Snyder.

Monaghan served on the council of the borough of West Chester and as chief burgess. He was trustee of the West Chester Normal School for 12 years and served as president of the board of trustees for a time. He was director of the Electric Light Company in West Chester. He served as president of the West Chester Gentleman's Club and as president and manager of the Chester County Agricultural Society. He was an incorporator and served as a member of the board of directors of the Union Trust Company of Philadelphia. Monaghan owned farming interests in Pettis County, Missouri, and property in Sedalia, Missouri. He was a stockholder of the Missouri Trust Company.

== Personal life ==
Monaghan married Rebecca Darlington Smith, daughter of Persifor Frazer Smith. They had two daughters and one son, including Frances Smith and Frazer Smith. He lived at 413 West Miner Street in West Chester.

Monaghan died on June 29, 1895, at his Pine Croft home in West Chester. He was buried at Oaklands Cemetery.
