= Stephen M. Meredith =

American politician (1802–1874)

Member of the Pennsylvania House of Representatives from the Chester County district
- In office 1868–1869 Serving with John Hickman, James M. Phillips, Archimedes Robb
- Preceded by: William Bell Waddell, Nathan J. Sharpless, Nathan A. Pennypacker
- Succeeded by: James C. Roberts, Joseph C. Keech, Abel Darlington

Personal details
- Born: Stephen Mendenhall Meredith; August 14, 1802 Concord Township, Delaware County, Pennsylvania, U.S.
- Died: December 23, 1874 (aged 72) St. Mary's, Warwick Township, Chester County, Pennsylvania, U.S.
- Resting place: Nantmeal Friends Burial Grounds; Glenmoore, Pennsylvania, U.S.
- Party: Republican
- Children: 5
- Occupation: Politician; physician

Stephen Mendenhall Meredith (August 14, 1802 – December 23, 1874) was an American politician and medical doctor from Pennsylvania. He served as a member of the Pennsylvania House of Representatives, representing Chester County from 1868 to 1869.

== Early life ==
Stephen Mendenhall Meredith was born on August 14, 1802, in Concord Township, Delaware County, Pennsylvania. When young, his family moved to South Coventry Township.

== Career ==
Meredith was a physician and practiced in Pughtown.

Meredith was a Republican. He served as a member of the Pennsylvania House of Representatives, representing Chester County from 1868 to 1869.

== Personal life ==
Meredith had three sons and two daughters, Stephen M., John Q. A., H. Clay, Rebecca and Ella S. His son Stephen M. was a lawyer in Reading. His son John Q. A. was a physician, served in the Civil War and was superintendent of construction for the Mexican & International Railroad.

Meredith died on December 23, 1874, at his home in St. Mary's, Warwick Township. He was interred at Nantmeal Friends Burial Grounds in Glenmoore.
