= The Times Herald (Norristown, Pennsylvania) =

- Type: Daily newspaper
- Owner: MediaNews Group
- Founded: June 15, 1799 (as Norristown Gazette)
- City: Norristown, Pennsylvania
- Website: timesherald.com

The Times Herald is a daily newspaper in Norristown, Pennsylvania.

== History ==
The newspaper began as the Norristown Gazette, which published its first edition on June 15, 1799. The newspaper's first publisher was David Sower, the son of Christopher Sower, a controversial figure who published ant-war sentiments and was branded a Tory (at the time, a derogatory term for Americans loyal to the British during the American Revolution).

In 1800, the name of the newspaper was changed to the "Norristown Herald and Weekly Advertiser", a name it retained in various forms until 1922, when it was merged with the Norristown Daily Times to create the Norristown Times Herald. "Norristown" was eventually dropped from the flag, and The Times Herald has evolved into a multimedia news organization, delivering local news on several platforms. The Times Herald is considered to be the 13th oldest newspaper in the nation.

In 1816, David Sower Jr. purchased the Norristown Herald from his father. During his tenure as editor and publisher, David Jr. enlarged the pages and added a significant amount of office equipment. At some point he changed the name to the Norristown Herald and Montgomery county Advertiser [sic], with, for some unknown reason, a lower-case 'c' on "county".

In 1854, David Sower Jr. sold the Herald to John Hodgson of Doylestown. Hodgson built a stone building on Main Street, just east of DeKalb Street, to house the offices of the Herald. In 1837, the Free Press (a competing paper in Norristown) owner Robert Iredell bought the Norristown Herald and Weekly Advertiser, and the first edition of the Norristown Herald and Free Press was published Feb. 1, 1837.

In 1864, Morgan E. Will and Robert Iredell Jr. became proprietors of the Norristown Herald and Free Press, and later that year merged with the Norristown Republican. In 1869, the Wills and Iredell partnership was dissolved, and in December of that year Wills established the Daily Herald.

In 1881, the Norristown Daily Times was founded by Captain William Rennyson of Bridgeport, a Civil War veteran with no newspaper experience. In 1921, Ralph Beaver Strassburger bought the Daily Herald, and in June 1922 moved the operation to its current location on Markley Street, one block north of Main Street. In December of that same year, Strassburger purchased the Norristown Daily Times, and a week later the two papers were merged to form the Norristown Times Herald.

In 1993, following the death of J.A. Peter Strassburger, his estate sold the newspaper to the Journal Register Co. That same year the paper converted to a morning edition. Early the next year a Sunday edition was added.
