= Archimedes Robb =

American politician (1814–1875)

Member of the Pennsylvania House of Representatives from the Chester County district
- In office 1869–1869 Serving with James M. Phillips and Stephen M. Meredith
- Preceded by: John Hickman, James M. Phillips, Stephen M. Meredith
- Succeeded by: James C. Roberts, Joseph C. Keech, Abel Darlington

Personal details
- Born: December 8, 1814
- Died: November 24, 1875 (aged 60) Chester County, Pennsylvania, U.S.
- Resting place: Great Valley Presbyterian Church Cemetery; Malvern, Pennsylvania, U.S.
- Party: Republican
- Spouse: Eliza
- Children: 2
- Occupation: Politician; farmer

Archimedes Robb (December 8, 1814 – November 24, 1875) was an American politician from Pennsylvania. He served as a member of the Pennsylvania House of Representatives, representing Chester County in 1869.

== Early life ==
Archimedes Robb was born on December 8, 1814.

== Career ==
Robb was a Republican. He served as a member of the Pennsylvania House of Representatives, representing Chester County in 1869.

Robb was a farmer. He was president of the Mutual Fire Insurance Company of Chester County at the time of his death.

== Personal life ==
Robb married Eliza. His daughter Jennie A. married I. Heston Todd. His daughter Belle married John A. Holmes of St. Louis, Missouri. He lived in Frazer, Pennsylvania.

Robb died on November 24, 1875, at his home in Chester County. He was interred at Great Valley Presbyterian Church Cemetery in Malvern.
