= James M. Phillips =

American politician (1822–1891)

Member of the Pennsylvania House of Representatives from the Chester County district
- In office 1868–1869 Serving with John Hickman, Stephen M. Meredith, Archimedes Robb
- Preceded by: William Bell Waddell, Nathan J. Sharpless, Nathan A. Pennypacker
- Succeeded by: James C. Roberts, Joseph C. Keech, Abel Darlington

Personal details
- Born: September 6, 1822 Kennett Square, Pennsylvania, U.S.
- Died: June 4, 1891 (aged 68) Kennett Square, Pennsylvania, U.S.
- Resting place: Longwood Cemetery; Kennett Square, Pennsylvania, U.S.
- Party: Republican
- Spouse: Mary Pusey (m. 1846)
- Children: 2
- Occupation: Politician; farmer

James M. Phillips (September 6, 1822 – June 4, 1891) was an American politician from Pennsylvania. He served as a member of the Pennsylvania House of Representatives, representing Chester County from 1868 to 1869.

== Early life ==
James M. Phillips was born on September 6, 1822, in Kennett Square, Pennsylvania.

== Career ==
Around 1846, Phillips bought a farm in Bohemia Manor, Maryland, and farmed there. He then moved to St. Paul, Minnesota. He later moved to Chester County, Pennsylvania, and operated stone quarries near Avondale. He also worked as a lime burner.

Phillips was a Republican. He served as a member of the Pennsylvania House of Representatives, representing Chester County from 1868 to 1869.

== Personal life ==
In 1846, Phillips married Mary Pusey of Wilmington, Delaware. They had two children.

Phillips died of a stroke on June 4, 1891, at his home in Kennett Square. He was interred at Longwood Cemetery in Kennett Square.
