= William Hemphill Jones =

American politician (1811–1880)

8th Mayor of Wilmington, Delaware
- In office 1852–1853
- Preceded by: Columbus Evans
- Succeeded by: John Alderdice

Personal details
- Born: October 26, 1811 Wilmington, Delaware, U.S.
- Died: April 30, 1880 (aged 68) Washington, D.C., U.S.
- Children: 1
- Education: Yale University
- Occupation: Politician

William Hemphill Jones (October 26, 1811 – April 30, 1880) was an American politician in Delaware.

Jones, eldest son of Morgan and Mary (Hemphill) Jones, was born in Wilmington, Delaware, on October 26, 1811.

Jones graduated from Yale College in 1831. He studied law in Philadelphia with Joseph R. Ingersoll, and when admitted to the bar returned to Wilmington. Soon tiring of his profession, he devoted himself to the more political life. In 1836 he was Delaware Secretary of State, then member of the Delaware Legislature; and in 1851 was Mayor of Wilmington, being the first to hold the office by popular election. Soon after, on his removal to the city of Washington, he was appointed to a position in the Treasury Department, and in December, 1858, was made Chief Clerk in the office of the First Comptroller, and during his long service in that position was repeatedly entrusted with trusts of the highest responsibility, which he executed with fidelity and success. July 1, 1875, he was appointed Deputy First Comptroller of the Treasury, but held this office only until Sept. 4, 1876. At the opening of the 45th Congress, in December, 1877, he was made Secretary of the Committee of Ways and Means of the House of Representatives. He died in Washington, April 30, 1880, in his 69th year, of pneumonia, after a few days' illness.

He left a widow, daughter of Allan Thomson, of Wilmington, and one daughter.

Political offices
| Preceded by Columbus Evans | Mayor of Wilmington, Delaware; 1852–1853 | Succeeded by John Alderdice |
