= Pennybacker =

Pennybacker may refer to:

== People ==
- Isaac S. Pennybacker (1805–1847), American judge and politician
- Marguerite Pennybacker (born 1903), American social worker and singer
- Percy Pennybacker (1895–1963), American civil engineer
- Anna Pennybacker (1861–1938), American educator and women's rights activist
- Flora Pennybacker (born 1963), married name of British artist Flora McDonnell

== Other uses ==
- Pennybacker Bridge across Lake Austin in Austin, Texas, U.S.

== See also ==
- Penny Baker
- Penny Barker
- Pennypacker (disambiguation)
