= William Windle =

American politician

Member of the Pennsylvania House of Representatives from the Chester County district
- In office 1862–1864 Serving with Persifor Frazer Smith and Robert L. McClellan
- Preceded by: Isaac Acker, William T. Shafer, Caleb Pierce
- Succeeded by: William Bell Waddell, Nathan J. Sharpless, Nathan A. Pennypacker

Personal details
- Party: Republican; National Union Party
- Occupation: Politician

William Windle was an American politician from Pennsylvania.

Windle served in the Pennsylvania House of Representatives, representing Chester County in 1862 and 1863 as a Republican and in 1864 as a member of the National Union Party.
