= William Price (Pennsylvania politician) =

American politician (died 1875)

Member of the Pennsylvania House of Representatives from the Chester County district
- In office 1845–1846 Serving with Robert Parke, Jesse C. Dickey, William D. Thomas, George Ladley
- Preceded by: Robert Parke, Jesse C. Dickey, Joseph Whitaker
- Succeeded by: George Ladley, Henry S. Evans, Thomas K. Bull

Personal details
- Died: February 1875 (aged 74) North Coventry Township, Pennsylvania, U.S.
- Party: Whig; Republican
- Spouse: Lydia Urner
- Children: 6
- Occupation: Politician; farmer

William Price (died February 1875) was an American politician and farmer from Pennsylvania. He served as a member of the Pennsylvania House of Representatives, representing Chester County from 1845 to 1846.

== Early life ==
William Price was born to Hannah (née Bach) and Daniel Price.

== Career ==
Price was a Whig and later a Republican. He served as a member of the Pennsylvania House of Representatives, representing Chester County from 1845 to 1846. He worked as a farmer.

== Personal life ==
Price married Lydia Urner, daughter of Jonas Urner. They had three sons and three daughters, Daniel, Jonas, Nathan, Sarah Ann, Elizabeth and Caroline. His grandson William Price Coryell was a farmer.

Price died in February 1875, aged 74, at his home in North Coventry Township, Pennsylvania.
