= William Bell Waddell =

American politician and judge (1828–1897)

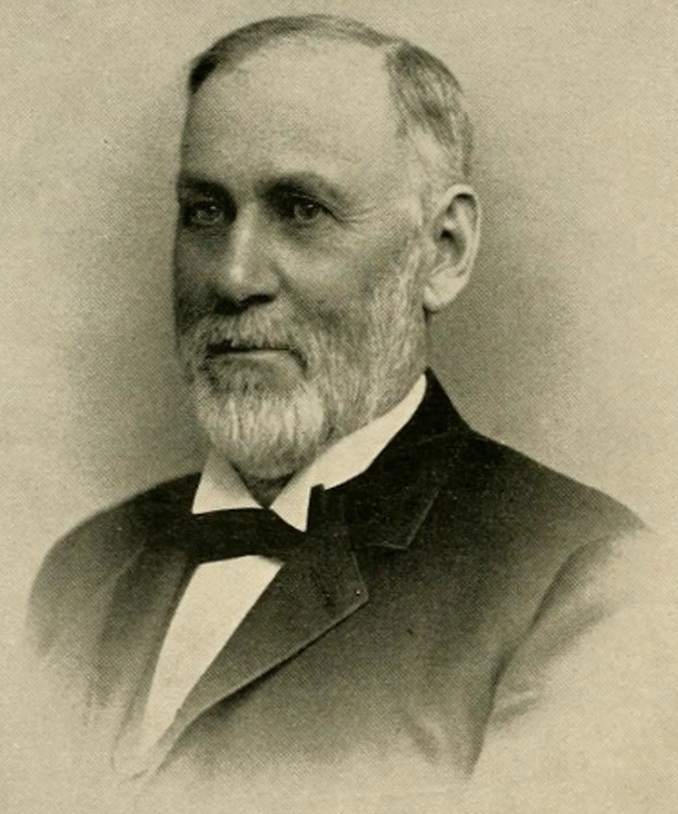
- Waddell in a 1893 publication

Member of the Pennsylvania Senate from the 5th district
- In office March 15, 1872 – 1873
- Preceded by: Henry S. Evans
- Succeeded by: Robert L. McClellan

Member of the Pennsylvania House of Representatives from the Chester County district
- In office 1865–1867 Serving with Nathan J. Sharpless and Nathan A. Pennypacker
- Preceded by: Persifor Frazer Smith, William Windle, Robert L. McClellan
- Succeeded by: John Hickman, James M. Phillips, Stephen M. Meredith

Personal details
- Born: September 21, 1828 Philadelphia, Pennsylvania, U.S.
- Died: June 3, 1897 (aged 68) West Chester, Pennsylvania, U.S.
- Resting place: Oaklands Cemetery; West Goshen Township, Pennsylvania, U.S.
- Party: Democratic; Republican
- Spouse: Mary Jane Worthington (m. 1855)
- Children: 2
- Education: Princeton College
- Occupation: Politician; lawyer; judge

William Bell Waddell (September 21, 1828 – June 3, 1897) was an American politician and judge from Pennsylvania. He served as a member of the Pennsylvania House of Representatives, representing Chester County from 1865 to 1867. He also served in the Pennsylvania Senate from 1872 to 1873.

== Early life ==
William Bell Waddell was born on September 21, 1828, in Philadelphia, Pennsylvania, to Mary S. (née Bell) and Robert Waddell. At the age of 5, he moved with his parents to Trenton, New Jersey. He lived there until around 13 and then moved after his mother's death to West Chester, Pennsylvania. He attended the private school of James Crowell in West Chester. He graduated from Princeton College in 1849. After graduating, he went to West Chester, Pennsylvania, and studied law under Joseph Hemphill, father of Joseph Hemphill. He was admitted to the bar on March 2, 1852.

== Career ==
After getting admitted to the bar, Waddell practiced law in West Chester. He was elected to the House of Burgess of West Chester in 1857. He served as major of the 10th regiment of the Pennsylvania Emergency Militia in 1862. Union Army officer Robert Cornwell read law under him in 1865–66.

Waddell was originally a Democrat, but changed to a Republican. In 1864, Waddell was elected as a Republican to the Pennsylvania House of Representatives. He represented Chester County in that body from 1865 to 1867. He served as chairman of the judiciary committee in his second session and as chairman of the ways and means committee in his third session. In 1871, he was elected as a Republican to the Pennsylvania Senate, representing the 5th district, succeeding Henry S. Evans. He served in that role from March 15, 1872, to 1873. He then returned to the practicing law in West Chester. He was elected delegate to the 1884 Republican National Convention. He ran for U.S. Congress unsuccessfully two times. He first lost to James Bowen Everhart and second to Smedley Darlington.

In 1887, Waddell was appointed as "additional law judge" of the Pennsylvania Court of Common Pleas. He was elected to the role in the fall of 1887 to a ten-year term concluding in 1898. After the death of J. Smith Futhey, he was appointed president judge of the Pennsylvania Court of Common Pleas. He served in that role from December 4, 1888, to his death.

== Personal life ==
Waddell married Mary Jane Worthington, daughter of Carver Worthington, on December 27, 1855. They had two children, Robert S. and Ruth R. His son Robert was also a lawyer. He was a member of the Presbyterian Church.

Waddell died of a heart attack on June 3, 1897, at his home in West Chester. He was buried at Oaklands Cemetery in West Goshen Township, Pennsylvania.
