= John Hodgson (Pennsylvania politician) =

American politician (died 1881)

Member of the Pennsylvania House of Representatives from the Chester County district
- In office 1858–1858 Serving with Eber W. Sharpe and Morton Garrett
- Preceded by: Ebenezer V. Dickey, James Penrose, Paxson Vickers
- Succeeded by: Isaac Acker, William T. Shafer, Caleb Pierce

Personal details
- Died: December 2, 1881 (aged 74) Chester, Pennsylvania, U.S.
- Party: Democratic
- Spouse: Elizabeth Hall (m. 1829, died)
- Children: 5
- Occupation: Politician; newspaperman

John Hodgson (died December 2, 1881) was an American politician and newspaperman from Pennsylvania. He served as a member of the Pennsylvania House of Representatives, representing Chester County in 1858. He published various newspapers in Pennsylvania, including the Norristown Herald, The Jeffersonian and Democratic Herald, and the Chester Times.

== Early life ==
John Hodgson was born to Ann(e) and William Hodgson. He moved with his family from England to America at the age of five or nine. They settled in West Chester, Pennsylvania, and his father was a minister of the Protestant Episcopal Church and his mother sold candy from a store in front of their home on West Gay Street. He learned the printing trade as an apprentice at the Village Record in West Chester under Charles Miner.

== Career ==
After learning the trade, Hodgson moved to Doylestown in Bucks County, and was a compositor at the Bucks County Intelligencer there. He then moved to Norristown in Montgomery County. In 1834, he purchased the Norristown Herald, a Whig paper and published it for a few years before selling the publication to Robert Iredell in 1837. He moved briefly to western Virginia and then moved to Philadelphia. He worked as a dry goods merchant in Philadelphia.

In 1842, Hodgson moved back to West Chester. On September 5, 1843, he started publishing the West Chester Herald. After a month, on October 3, it was published as The Jeffersonian and Democratic Herald, a Democratic weekly newspaper. He initially published it with Asher M. Wright. Wright left the paper in February 1845 and he became the sole owner. He later turned the paper over to his sons William and Charles. He worked as editor of the paper until 1865. During the Civil War, The Jeffersonian was known as a Copperhead newspaper, supporting the anti-war movement and slavery. At one point, federal authorities seized the paper.

Hodgson was elected as a Democrat and served as a member of the Pennsylvania House of Representatives, representing Chester County in 1858. He moved to Chester in the summer of 1876. In September 1876, he established the Chester Times (or Chester Daily Times) in Chester. After failing health, he sold the paper to J. Craig Jr. on March 7, 1877.

== Personal life ==
Hodgson married Elizabeth Hall of Doylestown, daughter of Samuel Hall and sister of the editor of the Bucks County Intelligencer, in December 1829. They had five children, William Hall, Elizabeth, Annie, Charles and John. His wife died in Philadelphia around 1843. His son William would start the Daily Local News. His brother Francis Hodgson was a minister at St. Paul's Methodist Episcopal Church.

Hodgson died on December 2, 1881, aged 74, in Chester.
