= Isaac Acker =

American politician (1821–1906)

Member of the Pennsylvania House of Representatives from the Chester County district
- In office 1858–1860 Serving with William T. Shafer and Caleb Pierce
- Preceded by: John Hodgson, Eber W. Sharpe, Morton Garrett
- Succeeded by: Persifor Frazer Smith, William Windle, Robert L. McClellan

Personal details
- Born: May 14, 1821
- Died: July 14, 1906 (aged 85) Wilmington, Delaware, U.S.
- Resting place: Great Valley Presbyterian Church Cemetery; Malvern, Pennsylvania, U.S.
- Party: Whig; Republican
- Relations: John Acker (cousin)
- Occupation: Politician; merchant; farmer

Isaac Acker (May 14, 1821 – July 14, 1906) was an American politician from Pennsylvania. He served as a member of the Pennsylvania House of Representatives, representing Chester County from 1858 to 1860.

== Early life ==
Isaac Acker was born on May 14, 1821, to Peter Acker.

== Career ==
A merchant and farmer, Acker was a Whig and Republican. He was elected as a Republican and served as a member of the Pennsylvania House of Representatives, representing Chester County from 1858 to 1860. He was postmaster of Warren Tavern (later Malvern). and later served as postmaster of Atglen from 1889 to 1893. Acker was a member of the board of directors of Norristown Insane Asylum.

== Personal life ==
Acker's cousin John Acker served in the Pennsylvania House.

Acker died on July 14, 1906, in Wilmington, Delaware. He was interred at Great Valley Presbyterian Church Cemetery in Malvern.
