= Mark A. Hodgson =

American politician (1793–1868)

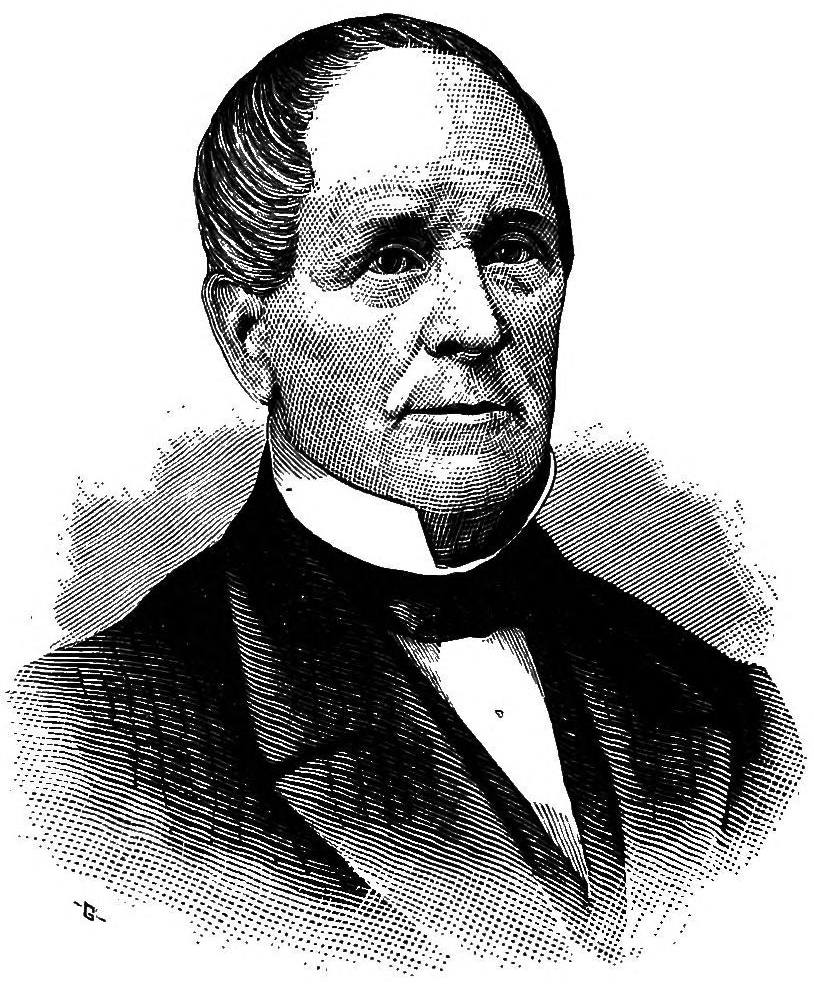
- Hodgson in an 1881 publication

Member of the Pennsylvania House of Representatives from the Chester County district
- In office 1855–1855 Serving with Matthias J. Pennypacker and William R. Downing
- Preceded by: Robert E. Monaghan, Henry T. Evans, William Wheeler
- Succeeded by: Andrew Buchanan, Joseph Dowdall, Robert Irwin

Personal details
- Born: Mark Alexander Hodgson; October 5, 1793 New London Township, Pennsylvania, U.S.
- Died: July 16, 1868 (aged 74)
- Party: Whig
- Spouse: Sophia Duffield (m. 1828)
- Children: 5
- Occupation: Politician; farmer

Mark Alexander Hodgson (October 5, 1793 – July 16, 1868) was an American politician from Pennsylvania. He served as a member of the Pennsylvania House of Representatives, representing Chester County in 1855.

== Early life ==
Mark Alexander Hodgson was born on October 5, 1793, in New London Township, Pennsylvania, to Sarah (née Alexander) and Robert Hodgson.

== Career ==
Hodgson worked in agricultural pursuits in New London Township until 1861. He then moved to Oxford. He served as justice of the peace starting in 1830 for about 20 years. He was a trustee of the New London Academy and built a public school on his own land before the public school system existed.

Hodgson was a Whig. He served as a member of the Pennsylvania House of Representatives, representing Chester County in 1855.

== Personal life ==
Hodgson married Sophia Duffield, sister of George Duffield and granddaughter of George Duffield, on March 25, 1828. They had five children, Robert, George D., Henry D., Mark A. Jr. and Mary A. He was a ruling elder of the New London Presbyterian Church for more than 20 years.

Hodgson died on July 16, 1868.
