= Abel Darlington =

American politician (1810–1897)

Member of the Pennsylvania House of Representatives from the Chester County district
- In office 1870–1870 Serving with James C. Roberts and Joseph C. Keech
- Preceded by: James M. Phillips, Stephen M. Meredith, Archimedes Robb
- Succeeded by: Joseph C. Keech, Levi Prizer, Samuel H. Hoopes

Personal details
- Born: February 22, 1810 Westtown Township, Pennsylvania, U.S.
- Died: January 1897 (aged 86) Pocopson Township, Pennsylvania, U.S.
- Party: Republican
- Occupation: Politician; farmer

Abel Darlington (February 22, 1810 – January 1897) was an American politician from Pennsylvania. He served as a member of the Pennsylvania House of Representatives, representing Chester County in 1870.

== Formative years ==
Abel Darlington was born on February 22, 1810, in Westtown Township, Pennsylvania.

== Career ==
Darlington was a farmer. He was elected as justice of the peace and served from 1853 to 1869 and from 1871 to 1890.

Darlington was a Republican. He served as a member of the Pennsylvania House of Representatives, representing Chester County in 1870.

== Death and interment ==
Darlington died on January 26 or 27, 1897, at his home in Pocopson Township.
