= Columbus Evans =

American politician, newspaper editor, and soldier (1824–1854)

7th Mayor of Wilmington, Delaware
- In office 1851–1852
- Preceded by: Joshua Driver
- Succeeded by: William Hemphill Jones

Personal details
- Born: Columbus Penn Evans; September 6, 1824 Montgomery County, Pennsylvania, U.S.
- Died: February 19, 1854 (aged 29) West Chester, Pennsylvania
- Resting place: Oaklands Cemetery
- Party: Whig
- Relatives: Henry S. Evans (brother)
- Occupation: Journalist, soldier, politician

Columbus Penn Evans (September 6, 1824 – February 19, 1854) was an American politician, newspaper editor, and soldier from Pennsylvania. He served as mayor of Wilmington, Delaware, in 1851–52.

== Life and career ==
Evans was born in Montgomery County, Pennsylvania, to Septimus and Catharine (Haupt) Evans. He was the younger brother of Henry S. Evans, a Pennsylvania state representative and the owner-publisher of The Village Record in West Chester. He attended West Chester Academy under superintendent Anthony Bolmar from May 1834 to May 1836. After serving an apprenticeship with his brother's newspaper, Evans moved to Wilmington, Delaware, in 1844 to work as editor of the Delaware Republican newspaper.

During the Mexican–American War, Evans served as a first lieutenant with the 11th United States Infantry Regiment, which saw extensive combat in the Battle for Mexico City. Evans commanded his company at the Battle of Chapultepec after Captain George W. Chaytor returned home on sick leave, and he distinguished himself in action at the Battle of Molino del Rey. On August 20, 1847, he received the brevet of captain "for gallant and meritorious conduct in the battles of Contreras and Cherubusco."

After the war ended, Evans and his company returned home via New York in August 1848, whereupon he resumed his editorial duties in Wilmington. On February 20, 1849, the Delaware General Assembly appropriated one hundred dollars to present him with a suitably inscribed ceremonial sword along with a letter from Governor William Tharp. Elected mayor of Wilmington as a Whig in 1851, Evans did not seek reelection in 1852.

Evans died of tuberculosis in West Chester on February 19, 1854, at the age of 29. He was interred with military honors at Oaklands Cemetery.
