= John Acker (Pennsylvania politician) =

American politician (1814–1904)

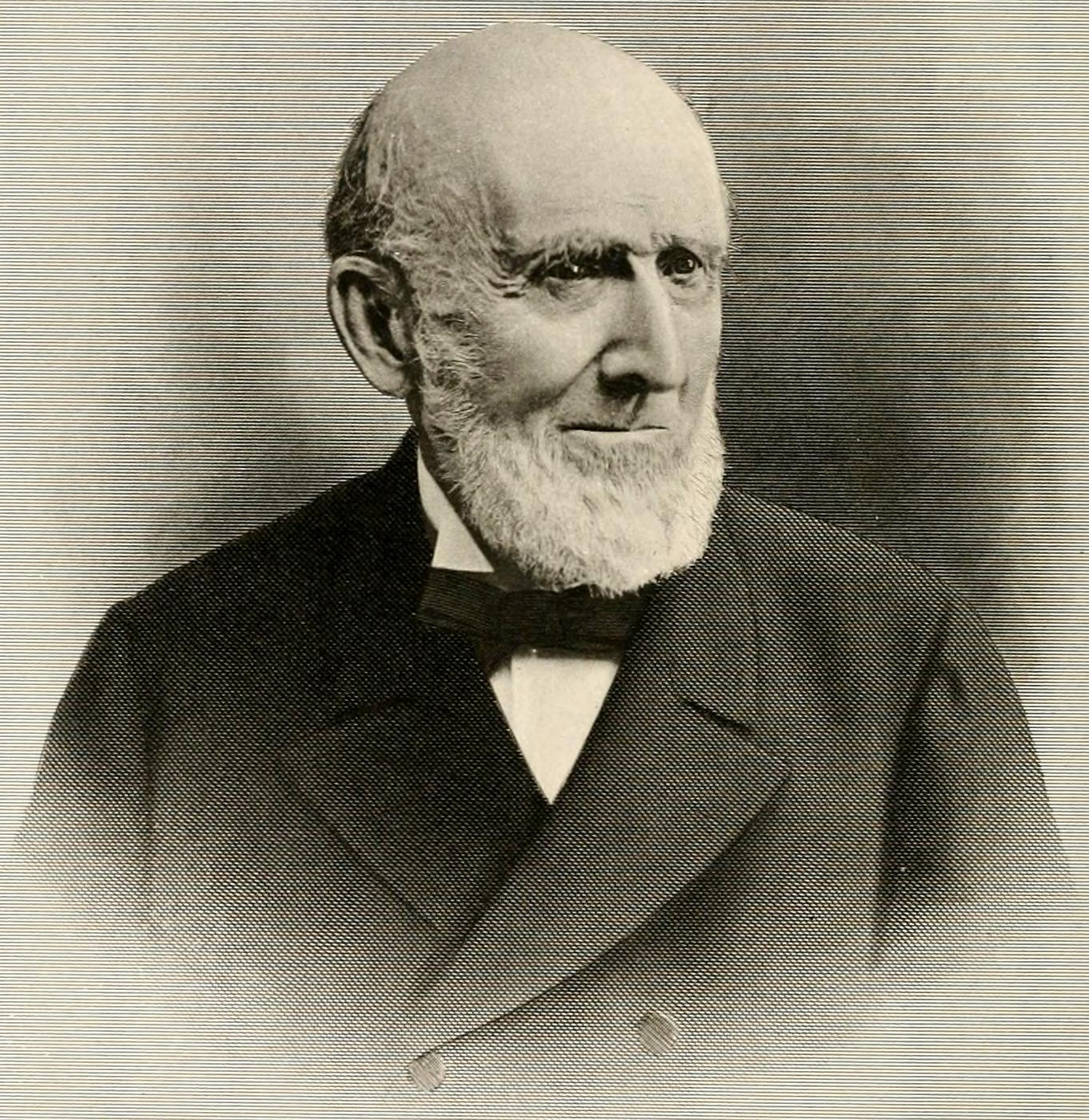
- Acker in a 1904 publication

Member of the Pennsylvania House of Representatives from the Chester County district
- In office 1852–1852 Serving with William Chandler and Jesse James
- Preceded by: David J. Bent, John S. Evans, James M. Dorlan
- Succeeded by: William Chandler, Joseph Hickman, Jesse James
- In office 1850–1850 Serving with David J. Bent and John S. Bowen
- Preceded by: Henry S. Evans, Thomas K. Bull, David J. Bent
- Succeeded by: David J. Bent, John S. Evans, James M. Dorlan

Personal details
- Born: November 1814 Uwchlan Township, Pennsylvania, U.S.
- Died: January 17, 1904 (aged 89) West Chester, Pennsylvania, U.S.
- Party: Whig; Republican
- Spouse(s): Lydia Harrar (m. 1837; died 1864) Mary L. Weaver (m. 1867; died 1898)
- Children: 5
- Relatives: Isaac Acker (cousin)
- Occupation: Politician; farmer
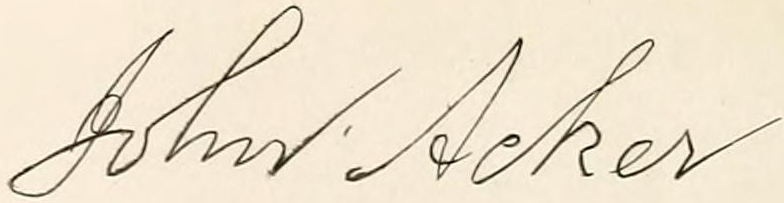
- Signature

John Acker (November 1814 – January 17, 1904) was an American politician from Pennsylvania. He served in the Pennsylvania House of Representatives, representing Chester County in 1850 and 1852.

== Early life ==
John Acker was born on November 26 or 29, 1814, in Uwchlan Township, Pennsylvania, to Catharine (née Laubach) and John Acker. His father was a farmer. Acker attended neighborhood schools and Joseph Hoopes's school in West Chester.

== Career ==
As a young man, Acker took up farming. In 1850, he joined a grain, coal and lumber business in East Whiteland Township. He stayed with the business until 1876. In 1876, he moved to Kentucky and started a fruit growing and nursery business. In 1896, he moved back to West Chester.

Acker was a Whig and Republican. In 1840, he was elected justice of the peace and remained in that role for 10 years. He served as a Whig in the Pennsylvania House of Representatives, representing Chester County in 1850 and 1852. He also served as the judge, inspector and clerk of elections.

== Personal life ==
Acker married Lydia Harrar, daughter of William Harrar, of Montgomery County on April 13, 1837. They had five children, Catherine, William, Caroline (died 1878), Elenor and Mary. His wife died in 1864. He married Mary L. Weaver, daughter of Baldwin Weaver, on November 28, 1867. She died in 1898. His cousin Isaac Acker was a member of the Pennsylvania House.

Acker died on January 17, 1904, at his home at 322 North High Street in West Chester.
