= Pennypack (disambiguation) =

Pennypack is the name of several places in and near Philadelphia, Pennsylvania:

- Pennypack Creek, a tributary of the Delaware River
  - Pennypack Creek Bridge, another name for the Frankford Avenue Bridge
- Pennypack Park, a Philadelphia municipal park through which the creek flows
- Pennypack, Philadelphia, a neighborhood near the park
- Pennypack Trail, a rail trail that runs parallel to part of the creek
- Penypack Theatre, former movie house named for the park

== See also ==
- Pennypacker (disambiguation)
