= William T. Shafer =

American politician (1825–1882)

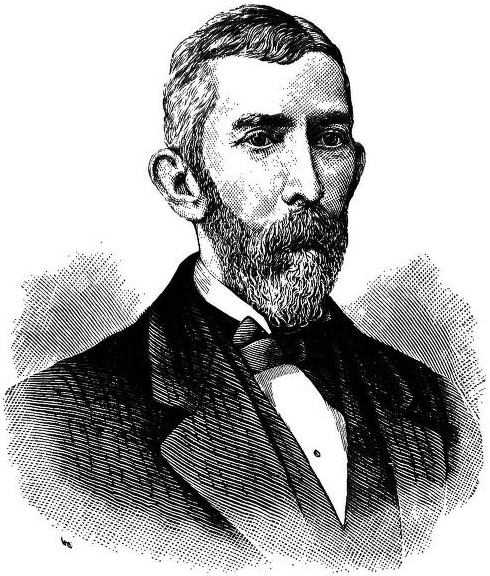
- Shafer in an 1881 publication

Member of the Pennsylvania House of Representatives from the Chester County district
- In office 1859–1861 Serving with Isaac Acker and Caleb Pierce
- Preceded by: John Hodgson, Eber W. Sharpe, Morton Garrett
- Succeeded by: Persifor Frazer Smith, William Windle, Robert L. McClellan

Personal details
- Born: William Thompson Shafer; February 17, 1825
- Died: April 3, 1882 (aged 57) West Pikeland Township, Pennsylvania, U.S.
- Resting place: Oaklands Cemetery; West Chester, Pennsylvania, U.S.
- Party: Republican
- Spouse: Mary E. Evans (m. 1865)
- Children: 1
- Occupation: Politician; merchant; educator
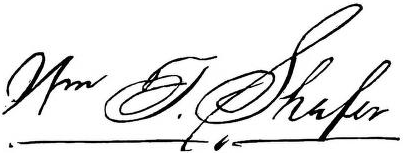
- Signature

William Thompson Shafer (February 17, 1825 – April 3, 1882) was an American politician from Pennsylvania. He served as a member of the Pennsylvania House of Representatives, representing Chester County from 1859 to 1861.

== Early life ==
William Thompson Shafer was born on February 17, 1825, to Martha (née Neilor) and John Shafer. He learned the carpenter's trade. He went to school under Joseph C. Strode.

== Career ==
Shafer worked as a teacher for several years. He worked in the mercantile business of Shafer's stand. He supporting his father as a clerk and, in 1849, he took over the store from his father.

Shafer was aide-de-camp for Governor James Pollock. In that role, he attained the rank of lieutenant colonel. He was a Republican and served as a member of the Pennsylvania House of Representatives, representing Chester County from 1859 to 1861. He served as school director and as auditor of West Pikeland Township.

== Personal life ==
Shafer married Mary E. Evans, daughter of Abel Evans, in 1865. They had one child, Martha.

Shafer died on April 3, 1882, in West Pikeland Township. He was interred at Oaklands Cemetery in West Chester.
