= Samuel H. Hoopes =

American politician (1811–1892)

Member of the Pennsylvania House of Representatives from the Chester County district
- In office 1871–1871 Serving with Joseph C. Keech and Levi Prizer
- Preceded by: James C. Roberts, Abel Darlington, Joseph C. Keech
- Succeeded by: Joseph C. Keech and Levi Prizer

Personal details
- Born: July 24, 1811 Chester, Pennsylvania, U.S.
- Died: August 26, 1892 (aged 81) Chester, Pennsylvania, U.S.
- Resting place: London Grove Friends Burial Ground; Kennett Square, Pennsylvania, U.S.
- Party: Republican
- Occupation: Politician; farmer

Samuel H. Hoopes (July 24, 1811 – August 26, 1892) was an American politician from Pennsylvania. He served as a member of the Pennsylvania House of Representatives, representing Chester County in 1871.

== Biography ==
Samuel H. Hoopes was born on July 24, 1811, in Chester, Pennsylvania.

Hoopes was a Republican. He served as a member of the Pennsylvania House of Representatives, representing Chester County in 1871.

He worked as a farmer. In 1891, he was a director of the National Bank of Chester County.

Hoopes died on August 26, 1892, in Chester. He was buried at London Grove Friends Burial Ground in Kennett Square.
