= Roger Kirk (Pennsylvania politician) =

American politician (1751–1809)

Member of the Pennsylvania House of Representatives from the Chester County district
- In office 1795–1801 Serving with Thomas Bull, John Ross, Robert Frazer, Joseph Pierce, Abiah Taylor, James Hannum, Joseph Hemphill, Isaac Wayne
- Preceded by: Dennis Whelen, Thomas Bull, John Ross, Joseph Pierce
- Succeeded by: Thomas Bull, John McDowell, Abiah Taylor, Isaac Wayne, William Gibbons

Personal details
- Born: June 5, 1751
- Died: March 20, 1809 (aged 57)
- Party: Whig
- Spouse: Rachel Hughes
- Children: 9, including Timothy
- Relatives: Theodore K. Stubbs (great-grandson)
- Occupation: Politician

Roger Kirk (June 5, 1751 – March 20, 1809) was an American politician from Pennsylvania. He served as a member of the Pennsylvania House of Representatives, representing Chester County from 1795 to 1801.

== Early life ==
Roger Kirk was born on June 5, 1751, to Ann (née Gatchell) and Timothy Kirk.

== Career ==
Kirk served in the Revolutionary War with the Continental Army. He reached the rank of captain.

Kirk was a Whig. He served as a member of the Pennsylvania House of Representatives, representing Chester County, from 1795 to 1801. He helped pass a bill to grade Christiana Road.

== Personal life ==
Kirk married Rachel Hughes, daughter of Elisha Hughes, of East Nottingham. They had nine children, Elisha (1775–1823), Jacob (1779–1841), twins Timothy (1781–c. 1839) and John (1781–1853), Josiah (1784–1821), Ann (1788–1816), Levi (1790–1814), Mary (1792–1857) and Lewis (1793–1825). His son Timothy was a member of the Pennsylvania House of Representatives. His daughter Ann married U.S. Congressman Jeremiah Brown. His son Josiah worked in management in flour mills, paper mills and a cotton factory. His great-grandson Theodore K. Stubbs served as a member of the Pennsylvania House of Representatives. The family lived on North East Creek.

Kirk died on March 20, 1809.
