= Nathan J. Sharpless =

American politician (1823–1893)

Member of the Pennsylvania House of Representatives from the Chester County district
- In office 1865–1867 Serving with William Bell Waddell and Nathan A. Pennypacker
- Preceded by: Persifor Frazer Smith, William Windle, Robert L. McClellan
- Succeeded by: John Hickman, James M. Phillips, Stephen M. Meredith

Personal details
- Born: July 28, 1823 near Downingtown, Pennsylvania, U.S.
- Died: May 30, 1893 (aged 69) West Grove, Pennsylvania, U.S.
- Resting place: Downingtown Friends Meeting House Cemetery
- Party: Republican
- Spouse: Ruthanna Edge (m. 1848)
- Children: 4
- Occupation: Politician; farmer; merchant; surveyor

Nathan J. Sharpless (July 28, 1823 – May 30, 1893) was an American politician from Pennsylvania. He served as a member of the Pennsylvania House of Representatives, representing Chester County from 1865 to 1867.

== Early life ==
Nathan J. Sharpless was born on July 28, 1823, near Downingtown, Pennsylvania, to Sophia (née Clemson) and Joshua B. Sharpless.

== Career ==
Sharpless worked as a merchant in Downingtown. He then moved to Paradise Township, Lancaster County, Pennsylvania, and worked as a farmer there from 1852 to 1857. In 1857, he returned to Chester County. He was elected justice of the peace and school director of West Marlborough Township. He also worked in real estate and insurance.

Sharpless was a Republican. He served as a member of the Pennsylvania House of Representatives, representing Chester County from 1865 to 1867. He was a member of the council of Downingtown.

Sharpless worked as a land surveyor and conveyancer in West Grove. He was president of the State Experimental Farm Club.

== Personal life ==
Sharpless married Ruthanna Edge, daughter of John Edge, on February 23, 1848. He had four children, Francis (1850–1851), Fannie R. (born 1851), Elizabeth (born 1853) and Joshua (1856–1856).

Sharpless died on May 30, 1893, at his home in West Grove. He was interred at Downingtown Friends Meeting House Cemetery.
