= Robert L. McClellan =

American politician and dentist (1822–1889)

Member of the Pennsylvania Senate from the 19th district
- In office 1875–1876
- Preceded by: James Marion Weakley
- Succeeded by: James B. Everhart

Member of the Pennsylvania House of Representatives from the Chester County district
- In office 1862–1864 Serving with Persifor Frazer Smith and William Windle
- Preceded by: Isaac Acker, William T. Shafer, Caleb Pierce
- Succeeded by: William Bell Waddell, Nathan J. Sharpless, Nathan A. Pennypacker

Personal details
- Born: October 20, 1822 West Brandywine Township, Pennsylvania, U.S.
- Died: February 5, 1889 (aged 66) Cochranville, Pennsylvania, U.S.
- Resting place: Upper Octorara Church Cemetery; Parkesburg, Pennsylvania, U.S.
- Party: Republican; Union Republican
- Education: Philadelphia College of Dental Surgery (DDS)
- Occupation: Politician; dentist

Robert L. McClellan (October 20, 1822 – February 5, 1889) was an American politician and dentist from Pennsylvania. He was a member of the Pennsylvania House of Representatives, representing Chester County from 1862 to 1864. He served as a member of the Pennsylvania Senate from 1875 to 1876.

== Early life and education ==
Robert L. McClellan was born on October 20, 1822, in West Brandywine Township, Pennsylvania.

McClellan studied dentistry with Sharpless Clayton for fifteen months starting in April 1847. He later graduated from Philadelphia College of Dental Surgery with a DDS.

== Career ==
After his training, McClellan worked as an assistant with William H. Thompson of Coatesville and Robert W. McKissick of Cochranville. He started his own dentistry practice after McKissick died in early 1851. He then practiced in Cochranville.

McClellan was a Republican. He was a member of the Pennsylvania House of Representatives, representing Chester County from 1862 to 1864. In 1863, he was elected as a Union Republican. He was chairman of the educational committee and in 1864, he introduced the bill to create the Pennsylvania Soldiers' Orphans' Schools. In 1872, he was a candidate to be a member of the state constitutional convention, but lost to William Darlington. He was elected to the Pennsylvania Senate, serving from 1875 to 1876. In 1878, he was a candidate for auditor general. In 1888, he was a candidate for the Pennsylvania Senate against A. D. Harlan.

== Personal life ==
McClellan was an elder of Fogg's Manor Presbyterian Church.

McClellan died of pneumonia on February 5, 1889, in Cochranville. He was interred in Upper Octorara Church Cemetery in Parkesburg.
