= Jesse James (Pennsylvania politician) =

American politician (1794–1875)

Member of the Pennsylvania House of Representatives from the Chester County district
- In office 1852–1853 Serving with John Acker, William Chandler, Joseph Hickman
- Preceded by: David J. Bent, John S. Evans, James M. Dorlan
- Succeeded by: Robert E. Monaghan, Henry T. Evans, William Wheeler
- In office 1830–1830 Serving with Joshua McMinn, Jesse Pugh, Matthew Stanley
- Preceded by: Robert Miller, John Morgan, Isaac Trimble, Samuel McCleane
- Succeeded by: Thomas Ashbridge, Matthias Pennypacker, Arthur Andrews, Benjamin Griffith

Personal details
- Born: December 5, 1794
- Died: July 17, 1875 (aged 80)
- Party: Whig; Republican
- Spouse: Margaret Allen
- Children: 8
- Occupation: Politician

Jesse James (December 5, 1794 – July 17, 1875) was an American politician from Pennsylvania. He served as a member of the Pennsylvania House of Representatives, representing Chester County in 1830 and from 1852 to 1853.

== Early life ==
Jesse James was born on December 5, 1794, in West Nantmeal Township, Pennsylvania.

== Career ==
James was a Whig. He served as a member of the Pennsylvania House of Representatives, representing Chester County in 1830 and from 1852 to 1853. He later became a Republican. He was part of the anti-slavery and temperance reform movements. He was justice of the peace in West Nantmeal Township for nine years.

== Personal life ==
James married Margaret Allen, daughter of Captain Ephraim Allen. They had eight children, Hannah, Ephraim, Abner E., Sarah Elizabeth, Rachel, Jesse Allen, Isaac and Ruth Anna. His son Abner was a coal, lumber and grain businessman and a farmer. His son Jesse Allen was a surveyor, clerk and farmer.

James died on July 17, 1875.
