= Henry S. Evans =

American politician (1813–1872)

Member of the Pennsylvania Senate from the 5th district
- In office 1870 – February 9, 1872
- Preceded by: H. Jones Brook
- Succeeded by: William Bell Waddell

Member of the Pennsylvania Senate from the 4th district
- In office 1851–1854
- Preceded by: H. Jones Brook
- Succeeded by: James J. Lewis

Member of the Pennsylvania House of Representatives from the Chester County district
- In office 1847–1849 Serving with George Ladley, Thomas K. Bull, David J. Bent
- Preceded by: William Price, William D. Thomas, George Ladley
- Succeeded by: David J. Bent, John S. Bowen, John Acker

Personal details
- Born: Henry Sebastian Evans; April 1, 1813 Doylestown, Pennsylvania, U.S.
- Died: February 9, 1872 (aged 58) West Chester, Pennsylvania, U.S.
- Resting place: Oaklands Cemetery; West Chester, Pennsylvania, U.S.
- Party: Whig; Republican
- Spouse: Jane Darlington (m. 1841)
- Children: 4
- Relatives: Columbus Evans (brother)
- Occupation: Politician; newspaper publisher

Henry Sebastian Evans (April 1, 1813 – February 9, 1872) was an American politician from Pennsylvania. He served as a Whig member of the Pennsylvania House of Representatives, representing Chester County from 1847 to 1849. He served as a Whig member of the Pennsylvania Senate from 1851 to 1854 and as a Republican member of the Pennsylvania Senate from 1870 to his death in 1872.

== Early life ==
Henry Sebastian Evans was born on April 1, 1813, in Doylestown, Pennsylvania, to Septimus and Catherine (Haupt) Evans. Evans worked as a printer's apprentice under Edward Darlington. At the age of 14, he left school and was apprenticed in printing at the office of the Village Record published by Charles Miner in West Chester. He continued the apprenticeship until May 11, 1833.

== Business career ==
He worked as a journeyman in Philadelphia and Germantown Township. Around 1833, he published a paper in Waynesburg (now known as Honey Brook) in Chester County. He returned to West Chester in 1835. Evans then purchased the Village Record from Charles Miner. In 1854, he bought the Register and Examiner from John S. Bowen and James M. Meredith.

In 1848, Evans published an editorial in the Village Record expressing his outrage at Maryland slave catchers crossing over the border into Pennsylvania, breaking into a magistrate's house in Downingtown, pointing a gun at the owner and capturing a sixteen year old girl they claimed was an escaped slave.

He continued publishing theVillage Record until his death.

== Political career ==
Evans served as chief burgess of West Chester in 1861. He was a Whig candidate for the Pennsylvania Senate, but lost. He served as a member of the Pennsylvania House of Representatives, representing Chester County from 1847 to 1849. He was chairman of the printing and education committee. He was defeated in the election for house speaker in 1849 by William F. Packer. Evans served as a Whig member of the Pennsylvania Senate for the 4th district of Chester and Delaware counties from 1852 to 1854. He won the Whig party nomination for governor of Pennsylvania but withdrew from the race possibly due to an illness in the family. He continued his editorial work for a time and traveled to Europe in 1869. He was elected as a Republican member of the Pennsylvania Senate in 1870 to represent the 5th district. He remained in the senate until his death.

== Personal life ==
In 1841, he married Jane Darlington, the daughter of William Darlington and granddaughter of John Lacey. They had four children, including Barton, William and Henrietta S. His daughter Henrietta married baseball player Joe Borden. His brother Columbus Penn Evans was publisher of the Delaware Republican. He lived in a mansion on South Church Street in West Chester.

Evans died of pneumonia on February 9, 1872, at his home in West Chester. He was buried at Oaklands Cemetery in West Chester.
