= Galusha Pennypacker =

US Army general (d. 1916)

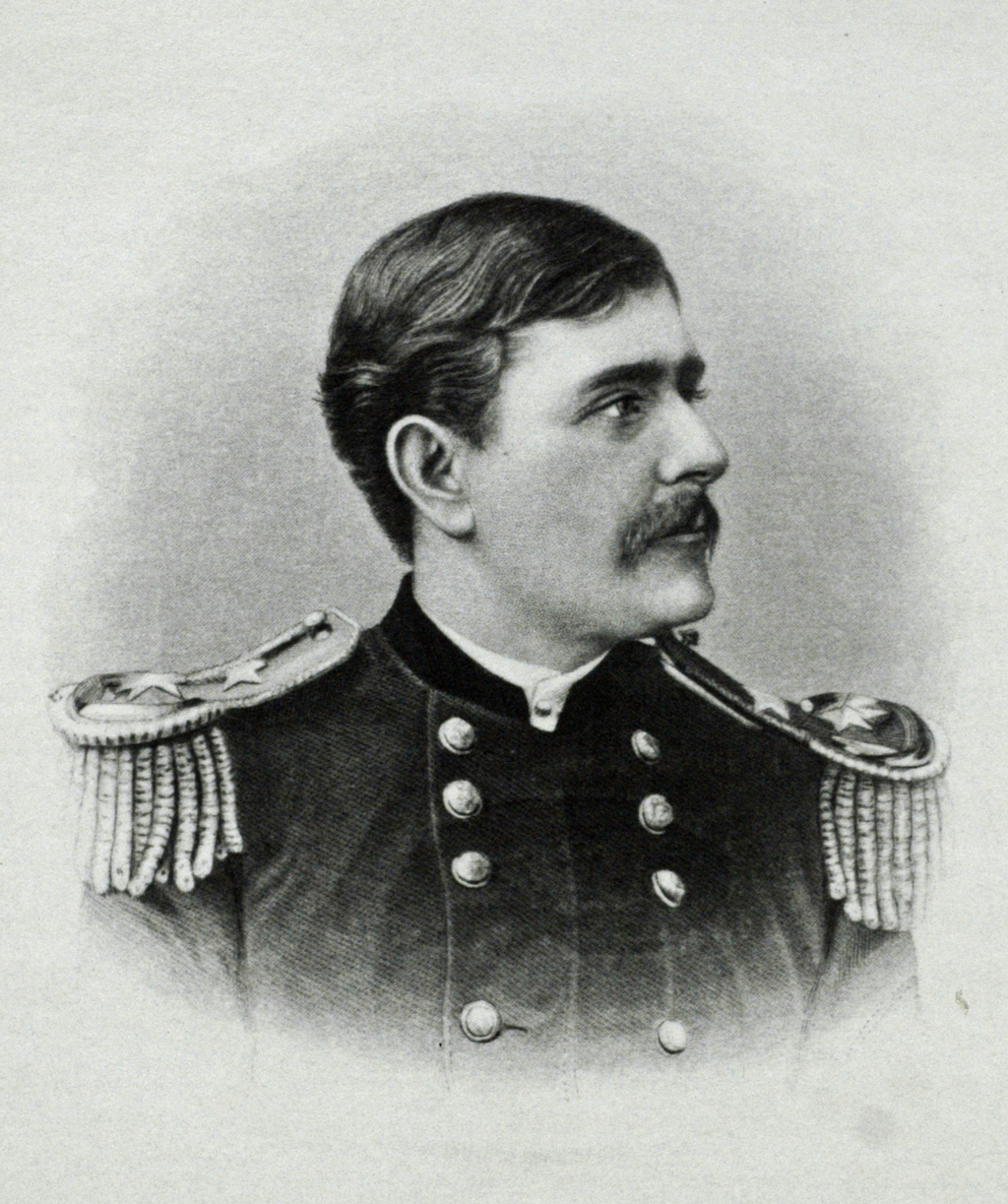
- Lithograph of Galusha Pennypacker
- Born: Uriah Galusha Pennypacker; June 1, 1841/1842/1844 (year of birth uncertain); Valley Forge, Pennsylvania, U.S.
- Died: October 1, 1916; Philadelphia, Pennsylvania, U.S.
- Burial place: Philadelphia National Cemetery, Philadelphia, Pennsylvania
- Relatives: Samuel W. Pennypacker (cousin); Matthias Pennypacker (great-grandfather)
- Military career
- Allegiance: United States of America; Union
- Branch: United States Army; Union Army
- Service years: 1861–1883
- Rank: Brigadier General; Brevet Major General
- Commands: 97th Pennsylvania Infantry; 34th U.S. Infantry; 16th U.S. Infantry
- Conflicts: American Civil War; Bermuda Hundred Campaign; Battle of Ware Bottom Church (WIA); Battle of Cold Harbor; Siege of Petersburg; Battle of New Market Heights (WIA); Second Battle of Fort Fisher (WIA)
- Awards: Medal of Honor

Signature
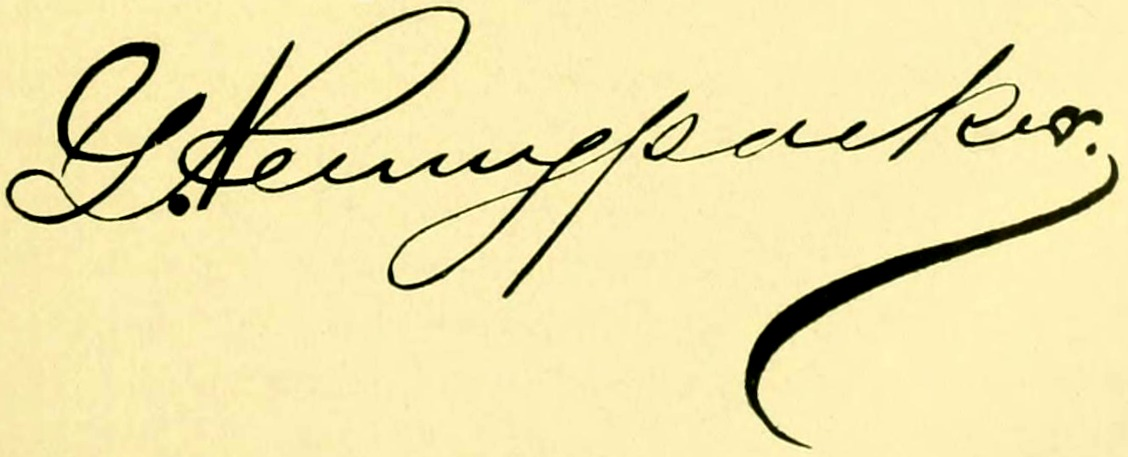

Uriah Galusha Pennypacker (June 1, 1841/1842/1844 – October 1, 1916) was a Union general during the American Civil War. He may be the youngest person to hold the rank of brigadier general in the US Army and remains the only general too young to vote for the president who appointed him. He was awarded the Medal of Honor for his leadership at the Second Battle of Fort Fisher during the Civil War.

== Early life ==
Galusha Pennypacker was born supposedly June 1, 1844, but the year is uncertain. Census and other records indicate an earlier year of birth, perhaps 1840–41; his death record cites June 1, 1842. Ages in this article are based on the 1844 date. He was born in Valley Forge, Pennsylvania, to a family with a long history of military service. He was raised without having any memory of his parents, Joseph Judson Pennypacker (1814–1880?) and Tamson A. Workheiser. His mother died when he was still a baby, and his father, who had taken part in the Mexican–American War, later became an adventurer in California, where he founded the Petaluma Argus newspaper in 1859 and sold it in December 1860. His grandfather also served in the military, fighting in the American Revolutionary War. Galusha and George Armstrong Custer, two of the youngest generals in the Civil War, were fifth cousins, both being descendants of Paulus Kuster (1643–1707). He was a cousin of General Benjamin Prentiss through the Pennypacker family. His great-grandfather was Matthias Pennypacker, Pennsylvania state representative.

== Military career ==
At the age of 16, Pennypacker enlisted as a quartermaster sergeant in the 9th Pennsylvania Infantry from West Chester, Pennsylvania. In August 1861, he helped recruit a company of men for the 97th Pennsylvania Infantry, and was appointed as their Captain. He was promoted to major the following October. Pennypacker and his regiment saw action in Georgia at Fort Pulaski and in the battles around Charleston. In 1864, his regiment was transferred to Virginia, where he was engaged in the Bermuda Hundred Campaign under Maj. Gen. Benjamin Butler, in which he was wounded at the Battle of Ware Bottom Church. After the Battle of Cold Harbor and during the siege of Petersburg, he was appointed Colonel of his regiment, August 15, 1864. He assumed command of the 2nd Brigade, 2nd Division, X Corps of the Army of the James. He led his brigade into action at the Battle of New Market Heights and was wounded near Fort Gilmer. His brigade was attached to the Fort Fisher Expedition under Alfred Terry.

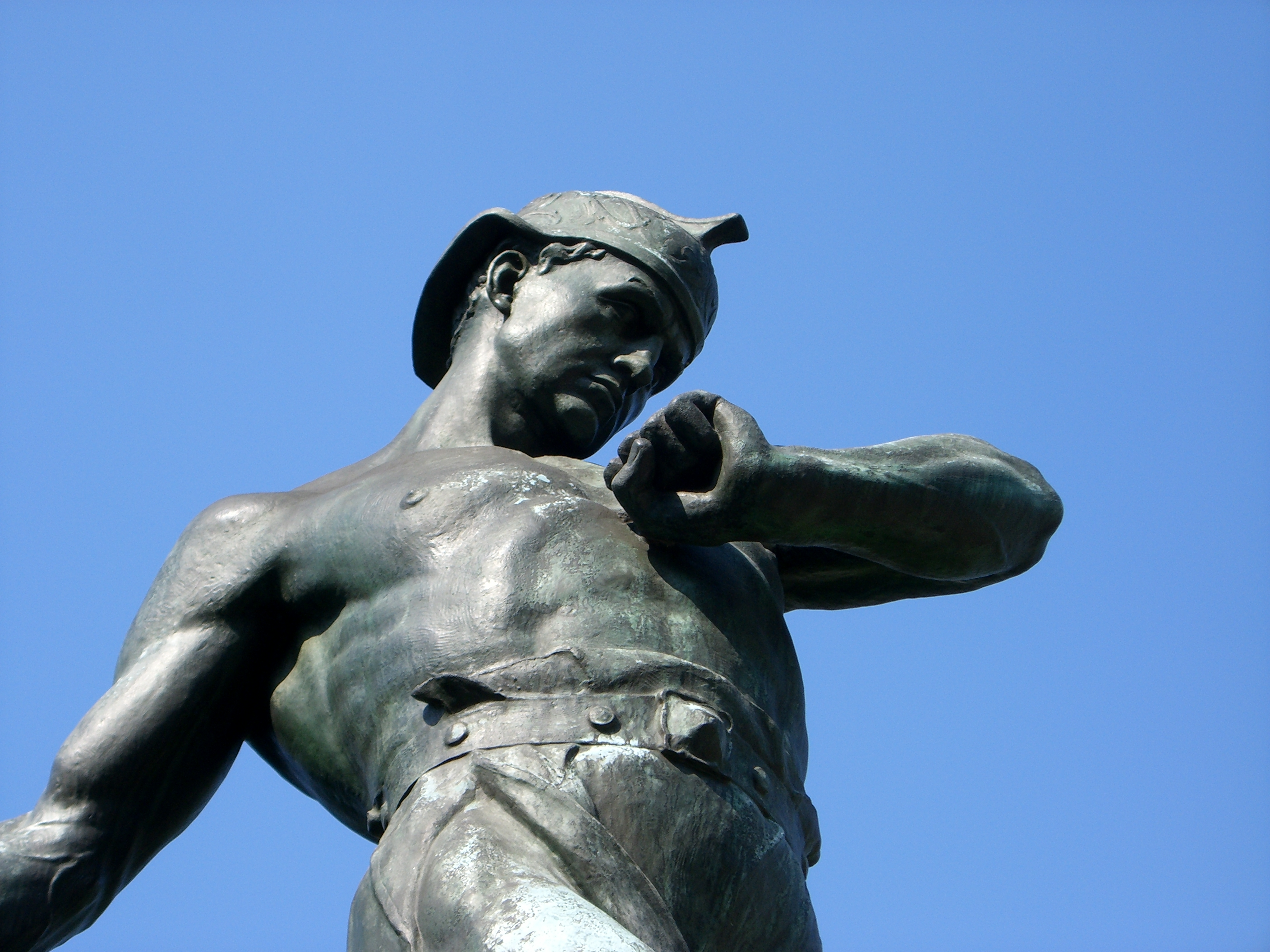
General Galusha Pennypacker Memorial, Logan Square, Philadelphia, Charles Grafly and Albert Laessle, sculptors.

Pennypacker's greatest moment of the war came at the Second Battle of Fort Fisher, January 15, 1865, where he was again severely wounded. His wound was considered fatal and General Terry promised the young officer that he would receive a brevet promotion for his conduct that day. Terry called Pennypacker "the real hero of Fort Fisher" and remarked that without his bravery the fort would not have been taken. He was much later awarded the Medal of Honor, with a citation reading, "Gallantly led the charge over a traverse and planted the colors of one of his regiments thereon, was severely wounded."

He received a brevet promotion to brigadier general dated January 15, 1865. He survived his wounds after 10 months in the hospital and on April 28, 1865, he received a full promotion to brigadier general of volunteers at age 20 (backdated to February 18), making him the youngest officer to hold the rank of brigadier general to this day in the United States Army (though Marquis de LaFayette was just 19 when he received his commission as major general in the Continental Army on 31 July 1777). He was appointed a brevet major general of volunteers on March 13, 1865.

Pennypacker stayed in the Army after the Civil War, being commissioned as Colonel of the 34th U.S. Infantry in July 1866. He received a brevet promotion to major general in the regular army on March 2, 1867. His regiment merged with the 11th U.S. Infantry in 1869 to become the 16th U.S. Infantry, which he commanded until his retirement in July 1883 at the age of 39.

In 1889, Pennypacker became an honorary member of the Pennsylvania Society of the Cincinnati. He also was a first class companion of the Pennsylvania Commandery of the Military Order of the Loyal Legion of the United States. In 1904, Pennypacker, having retired with the regular rank of colonel, was promoted to brigadier general on the retired list.

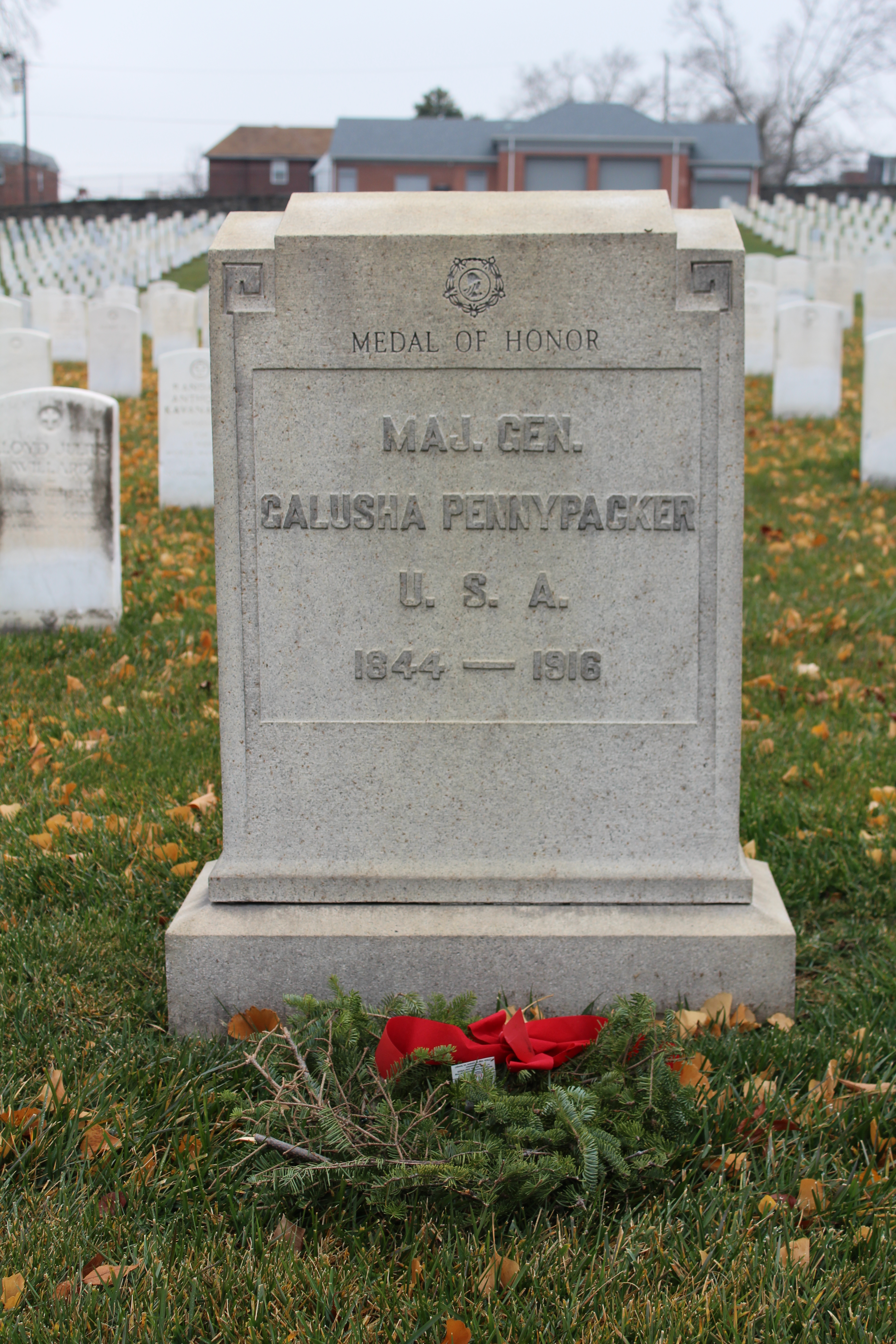
Pennypacker's tombstone in Philadelphia National Cemetery

== Death ==
Nearly fifty-two years after the Civil War, Pennypacker died from complications of his Civil War injuries. He died in Philadelphia, on October 1, 1916. He is buried in Philadelphia National Cemetery. He died less than a month after the death of his noted cousin, former Pennsylvania Governor Samuel W. Pennypacker.

== See also ==
- List of American Civil War Medal of Honor recipients: M–P
- List of American Civil War generals (Union)
- William Paul Roberts, youngest Confederate Army general
- Charles Cleveland Dodge brigadier general at 21
- Edmund Kirby nominated to brigadier general at 23, but killed in action
- George Armstrong Custer brigadier general at 23
