= Thomas Bull (Pennsylvania politician) =

American politician (1744–1837)

Member of the Pennsylvania House of Representatives from the Chester County district
- In office 1793–1801 Serving with Dennis Whelen, John Ross, Joseph Pierce, Robert Frazer, Roger Kirk, Abiah Taylor, James Hannum, Joseph Hemphill, Isaac Wayne, John McDowell Sr., Isaac Anderson, William Gibbons
- Preceded by: Dennis Whelen, Charles Dilworth, John Hannum III, Samuel Sharp
- Succeeded by: Joseph Park, James Fulton, Edward Darlington, Thomas Taylor, Methuselah Davis

Personal details
- Born: June 9, 1744
- Died: July 13, 1837 (aged 93)
- Spouses: Ann Hunter (m. 1771–1817) Lydia Crowell (m. 1819)
- Children: 8
- Relatives: Thomas K. Bull (grandson)
- Occupation: Politician; ironmaster

Thomas Bull (June 9, 1744 – July 13, 1837) was an American politician from Pennsylvania. He served as a member of the Pennsylvania House of Representatives, representing Chester County from 1793 to 1801.

== Early life ==
Thomas Bull was born on June 9, 1744, to William Bull.

== Career ==
Bull was manager for Potts & Rutter at the Warwick Furnace.

Bull was appointed lieutenant colonel in 1776 and later commissioned as a colonel in the Continental Army during the Revolutionary War. He was taken prisoner and imprisoned in New Jersey and Long Island. After returning from the war, he continued to work as a manager at the Warwick Furnace. He held an interest in Joanna Furnace in Robeson Township, Berks County until about 1831.

Bull was a delegate to the convention which framed the Pennsylvania Constitution of 1776 or 1790, sources differ. He served as a member of the Pennsylvania House of Representatives, representing Chester County from 1793 to 1801. Around 1810 or 1812, he was associated with the construction of a road from Lancaster Turnpike to Welsh Mountain.

Bull helped build St. Mary's Church in East Nantmeal (later Warwick Township).

== Personal life ==
Bull married Ann Hunter, daughter of John Hunter, of Whiteland on February 28, 1771. She died in 1817. He married Lydia Crowell, a widow, of Cape May, New Jersey, in 1819. He had eight children, Elizabeth (born 1771), Mary (1774–1798), Ann (1776–1850), Martha (1779–1850), Sarah (1779–1817), Levi (1780–1859), James Hunter (1782–1797) and Margaret (1787–c. 1819). His son Levi was an Episcopal clergyman and lawyer. His grandson Thomas K. Bull was a member of the Pennsylvania House of Representatives. He lived near Warwick Furnace and purchased some land from the Warwick Company near the south branch of French Creek. He was a vestryman of St. Peter's Episcopal Church.

Bull died on July 13, 1837. A few years prior to his death, an act of Congress paid Bull an annual pension of US$575 for his service in the Revolutionary War.
