= Matthias J. Pennypacker =

American politician (1819–1899)

Member of the Pennsylvania House of Representatives from the Chester County district
- In office 1855–1855 Serving with Mark A. Hodgson and William R. Downing
- Preceded by: Robert E. Monaghan, Henry T. Evans, William Wheeler
- Succeeded by: Andrew Buchanan, Joseph Dowdall, Robert Irwin

Personal details
- Born: September 10, 1819 Schuylkill Township, Chester County, Pennsylvania, U.S.
- Died: August 31, 1899 (aged 79) Schuylkill Township, Chester County, Pennsylvania, U.S.
- Resting place: Morris Cemetery
- Party: Republican
- Spouses: Annie R. Walker (m. 1848; died 1868) Kate A. Cook (m. 1878)
- Children: 10
- Parent: Matthias Pennypacker (father)
- Relatives: Samuel W. Pennypacker (nephew)
- Education: University of Pennsylvania School of Medicine
- Occupation: Politician; physician; farmer

Matthias J. Pennypacker (September 10, 1819 – August 31, 1899) was an American politician from Pennsylvania. He served as a member of the Pennsylvania House of Representatives, representing Chester County in 1855.

== Early life ==
Matthias J. Pennypacker was born on September 10, 1819, at Pennypacker's Mill in Schuylkill Township, Chester County, Pennsylvania, to Sarah (née Anderson) and Matthias Pennypacker. His father was a farmer and miller and operated a sawmill. His father also served in the Pennsylvania House of Representatives and was a member of the constitutional convention. His ancestors changed their surname from Pfannebecker to Pennypacker after immigrating to America. Pennypacker studied at the school of Joshua Hoopes in West Chester. He studied medicine and graduated from the University of Pennsylvania School of Medicine in 1841.

== Career ==
After graduating, Pennypacker practiced medicine in Philadelphia for a time before moving back to Chester County and practicing medicine there. He then worked as an assistant superintendent and manager of the Phoenixville Iron Works for two years. In 1849, he became a superintendent at Durham Iron Works in Durham Township in Bucks County. He worked there for one year before resigning due to poor health. He then returned to Chester County and purchased a farm and worked the land. He owned a 176 acres (71 ha) farm and a grist mill.

Pennypacker was a Republican. He served as a member of the Pennsylvania House of Representatives, representing Chester County in 1855.

== Personal life ==
Pennypacker married Annie R. Walker, daughter of William Walker, of Tredyffrin Township on April 27, 1848. They had five sons and four daughters, including William H., Matthias A., Sarah, Mary Athalia, Isaac A. and Annie W. His wife died in 1868. In 1878, he married Kate A. Cook, daughter of Tillinghast J. Cook, of Parkersburg, West Virginia. They had one son, James C. He was a member of the Methodist Episcopal Church in Phoenixville. His nephew was Pennsylvania Governor Samuel W. Pennypacker.

Pennypacker died on August 31, 1899, at his home in Schuylkill Township. He was buried at Morris Cemetery.
