= Nathan A. Pennypacker =

American politician (1835–1886)

Member of the Maryland House of Delegates from the Cecil County district
- In office 1865–1867 Serving with William Bell Waddell and Nathan J. Sharpless
- Preceded by: Persifor Frazer Smith, William Windle, Robert L. McClellan
- Succeeded by: John Hickman, James M. Phillips, Stephen M. Meredith

Personal details
- Born: October 20, 1835 Schuylkill Township, Chester County, Pennsylvania, U.S.
- Died: December 17, 1886 (aged 51) Phoenixville, Pennsylvania, U.S.
- Resting place: Morris Cemetery; Phoenixville, Pennsylvania, U.S.
- Party: Republican
- Education: Philadelphia College of Medicine (MD)
- Occupation: Politician; physician; farmer

Nathan A. Pennypacker (October 20, 1835 – December 17, 1886) was an American politician from Pennsylvania. He served as a member of the Pennsylvania House of Representatives, representing Chester County from 1865 to 1867.

== Early life ==
Nathan A. Pennypacker was born on October 20, 1835, in Schuylkill Township, Chester County, Pennsylvania. He attended Freeland Seminary. He graduated from Philadelphia College of Medicine with a Doctor of Medicine in 1856.

== Career ==
During the Civil War, Pennypacker was captain of Company K of the 30th regiment of the 4th Pennsylvania Reserve Regiment. He served from 1861 to 1864.

From 1859 to 1861, he served on the school board of Charlestown Township.

Pennypacker was a Republican. He served as a member of the Pennsylvania House of Representatives, representing Chester County from 1865 to 1867. He was a member of the board of commissioners of the State Hospital for the Insane in Norristown, Pennsylvania, from 1877 to 1878. He served as lieutenant colonel of the staff of Governor Henry M. Hoyt. In 1882, he was an unsuccessful candidate for the U.S. Congress and the Pennsylvania Senate.

Pennypacker practiced medicine. He also worked as a farmer.

== Personal life ==
Pennypacker died on December 17, 1886, at his home in Phoenixville, Pennsylvania. He was interred at Morris Cemetery in Phoenixville.
