= Andrew Buchanan (surgeon) =

Scottish surgeon and professor of physiology

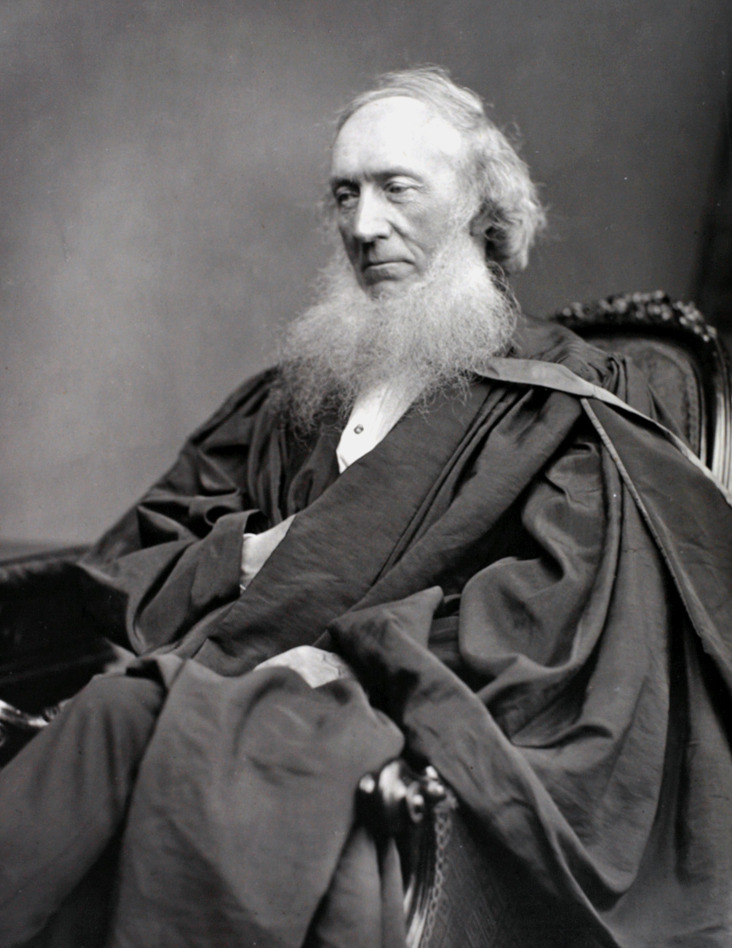

Andrew Buchanan (10 December 1798 – 1882) was a Scottish surgeon and academic. He served as Regius Professor of the Institutes of Medicine at the University of Glasgow from 1839 to 1876. He practised as a surgeon at the Glasgow Royal Infirmary 1835 to 1862. He was President of the Faculty of Physicians and Surgeons of Glasgow from 1879 to 1880. He founded the Glasgow Medical Journal in 1828, and became its joint-editor.
