= Andrew Buchanan (Pennsylvania state representative) =

American politician

Member of the Pennsylvania House of Representatives from the Chester County district
- In office 1856–1856 Serving with Joseph Dowdall and Robert Irwin
- Preceded by: Matthias J. Pennypacker, Mark A. Hodgson, William R. Downing
- Succeeded by: Ebenezer V. Dickey, James Penrose, Paxson Vickers

Personal details
- Party: Democratic
- Occupation: Politician

Andrew Buchanan was an American politician from Pennsylvania. He served as a member of the Pennsylvania House of Representatives, representing Chester County in 1856.

== Biography ==
Buchanan was a Democrat. He served as a member of the Pennsylvania House of Representatives, representing Chester County in 1856.

On October 2, 1872, Buchanan was ordained as a ruling elder of the Presbyterian Church. He had at least four sons, including John and David.
