= Samuel W. Pennypacker =

American judge, politician and historian (1843–1916)

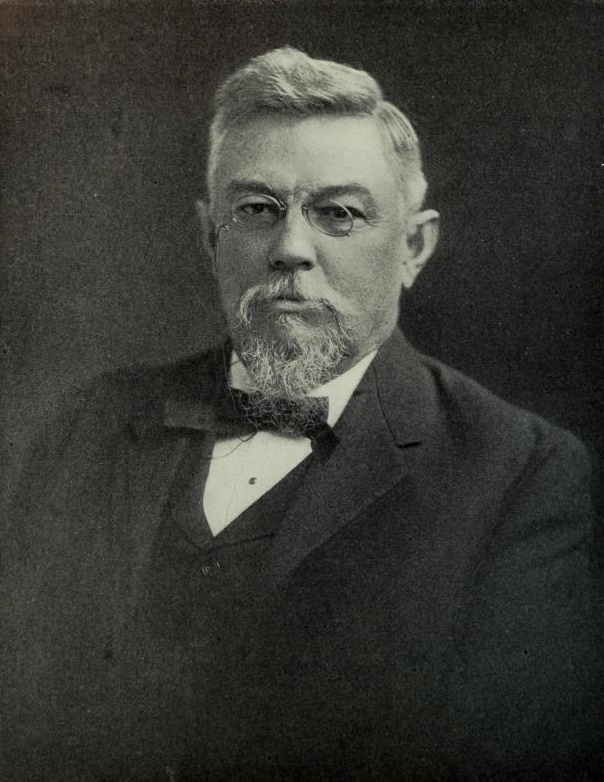
- Samuel W. Pennypacker, c. 1905

23rd Governor of Pennsylvania
- In office January 20, 1903 – January 15, 1907
- Lieutenant: William M. Brown
- Preceded by: William A. Stone
- Succeeded by: Edwin Sydney Stuart

Personal details
- Born: Samuel Whitaker Pennypacker; April 9, 1843 Phoenixville, Pennsylvania, U.S.
- Died: September 2, 1916 (aged 73) Schwenksville, Pennsylvania, U.S.
- Party: Republican
- Spouse: Virginia Earl Broomall (m. 1870)
- Children: 4
- Relatives: Galusha Pennypacker (cousin); Matthias J. Pennypacker (uncle); Matthias Pennypacker (grandfather); Joseph Whitaker (grandfather); Isaac Anderson (great-grandfather)
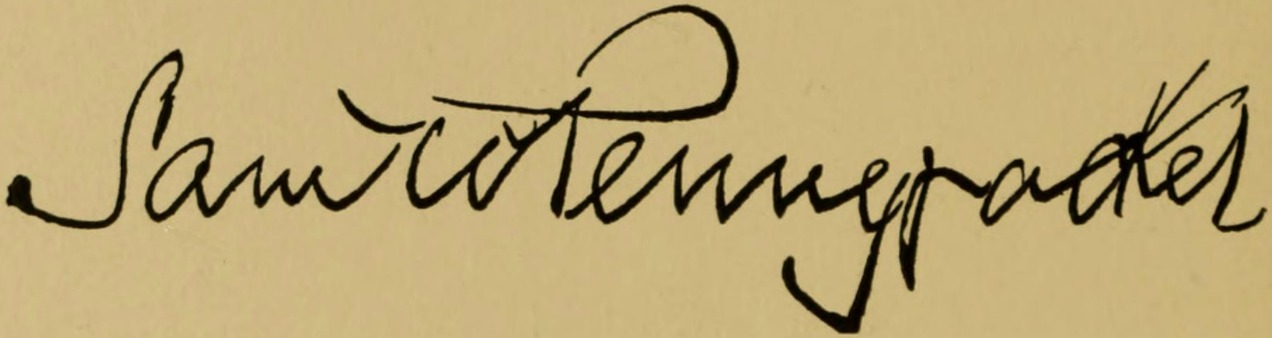
- Signature

Samuel Whitaker Pennypacker (April 9, 1843 – September 2, 1916) was an American judge and politician who served as the 23rd governor of Pennsylvania from 1903 to 1907. A judge assigned to Pennsylvania's Court of Common Pleas system prior to his election as governor, he also researched and wrote about Pennsylvania history.

== Biography ==
Samuel Whitaker Pennypacker was born in Phoenixville, Pennsylvania, on April 9, 1843. He was the son of Anna Maria (née Whitaker) and Isaac Anderson Pennypacker, and the grandson of Matthias Pennypacker and Sarah Anderson (daughter of Isaac Anderson), and of Joseph and Grace Whitaker. He was the nephew of Matthias J. Pennypacker and a cousin of Galusha Pennypacker. He and his grandfather Whitaker witnessed Abraham Lincoln's speech outside Independence Hall in February 1861, standing 20 feet (6.1 m) away. He received his education at the Grovemont Seminary at Phoenixville and at the West Philadelphia Institute. The family emigrated from Germany to Pennsylvania in 1699 with his great-great-great-grandfather Hendrick Pannebecker (aka Pfannebecker; 1674–1754). Abraham op den Graeff, an early abolitionist and signer of the first organized religious protest against slavery in colonial America in 1688, was his fourth great-grandfather.

Pennypacker's early education was interrupted several times. In 1863, he answered a call to arms by Governor Andrew Curtin during the Gettysburg campaign of the American Civil War. He enlisted as a private in Company F of the 26th Pennsylvania Volunteer Militia and trained at Camp Curtin. He fought in the skirmish at Witmer Farm, north of Gettysburg on June 26, 1863, an action that saw his newly recruited regiment retreat to Harrisburg when confronted by veteran Virginia cavalry. He left the emergency militia in late July 1863 and resumed his education.

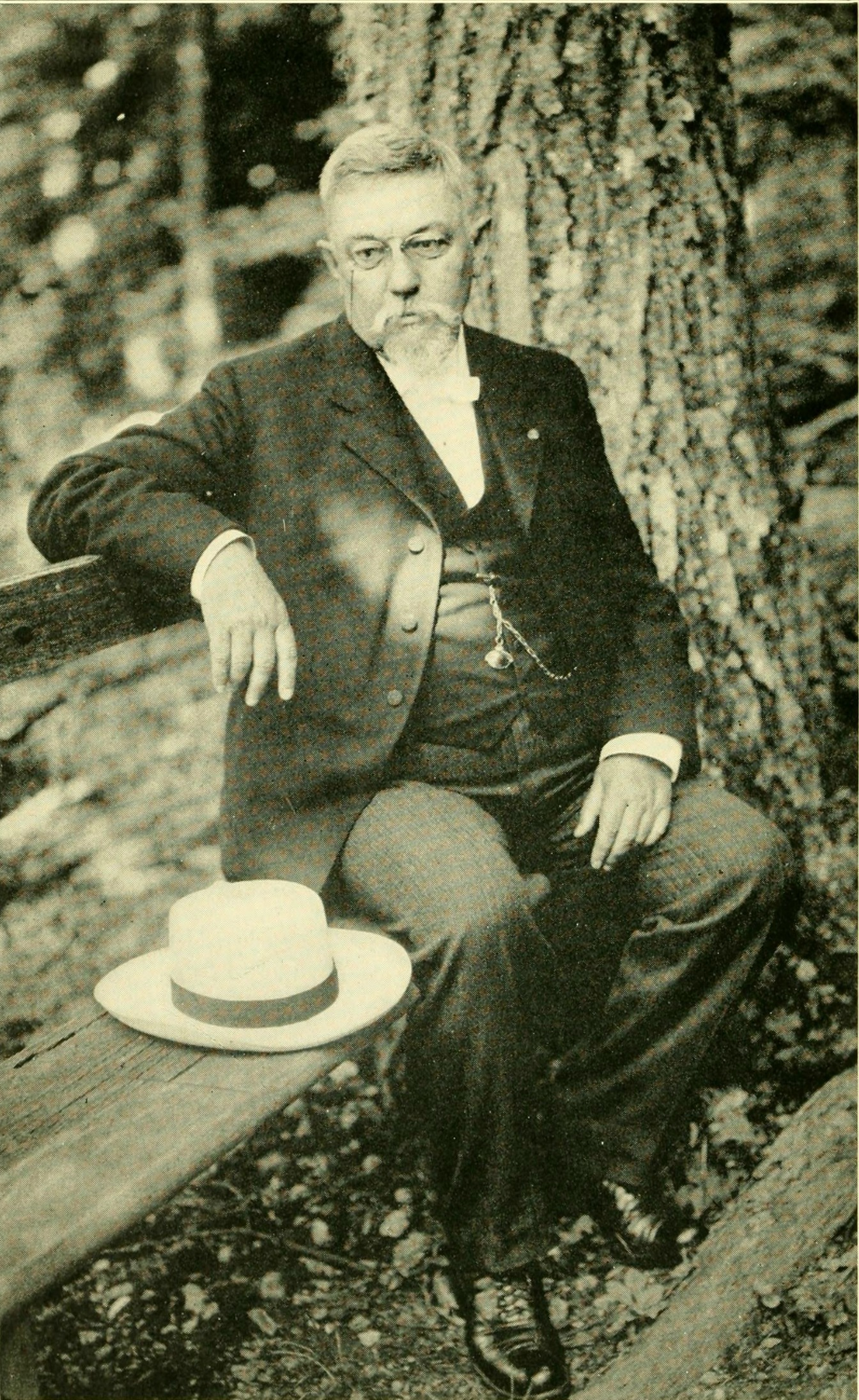
From Autobiography of a Pennsylvanian

Pennypacker studied law at the University of Pennsylvania and opened his own law practice in 1866. Elected president of the Law Academy of Philadelphia in 1868, he was then also selected for membership with the American Philosophical Society in 1886.

From 1876 to 1888, he was reporter-in-chief for the Court of Common Pleas No. 3. In 1889, he was appointed judge of the Court of Common Pleas No. 2 and was elected for two terms of ten years each, acting for several years (1896–1902) as president judge of that court. In 1902, he soundly defeated Robert Pattison, who was seeking a third nonconsecutive term as governor, from January 20, 1903, to January 15, 1907. During his term in office, Pennypacker signed into law the Child Labor Act of 1905; setting a minimum age and standard for young workers. He created the Pennsylvania State Police and the State Museum, and oversaw the completion of the new state capitol building. He led a war on the easy divorce system of Pennsylvania.

He also signed the Salus-Grady libel law, requiring newspapers to print the names of their owners and editors and making them responsible for negligence. The Salus-Grady law also banned "any cartoon or caricature or picture portraying, describing or representing any person, either by distortion, innuendo or otherwise, in the form or likeness of beast, bird, fish, insect, or other unhuman animal, thereby tending to expose such person to public hatred, contempt, or ridicule." Pennypacker had been insultingly caricatured as a parrot during his campaign, mindlessly mimicking the words of his political bosses. The passage of this law was widely criticized, not least by Pennsylvania cartoonists who immediately began depicting political figures as inanimate objects and vegetables. The furor was observed nationwide, and the law was never enforced.

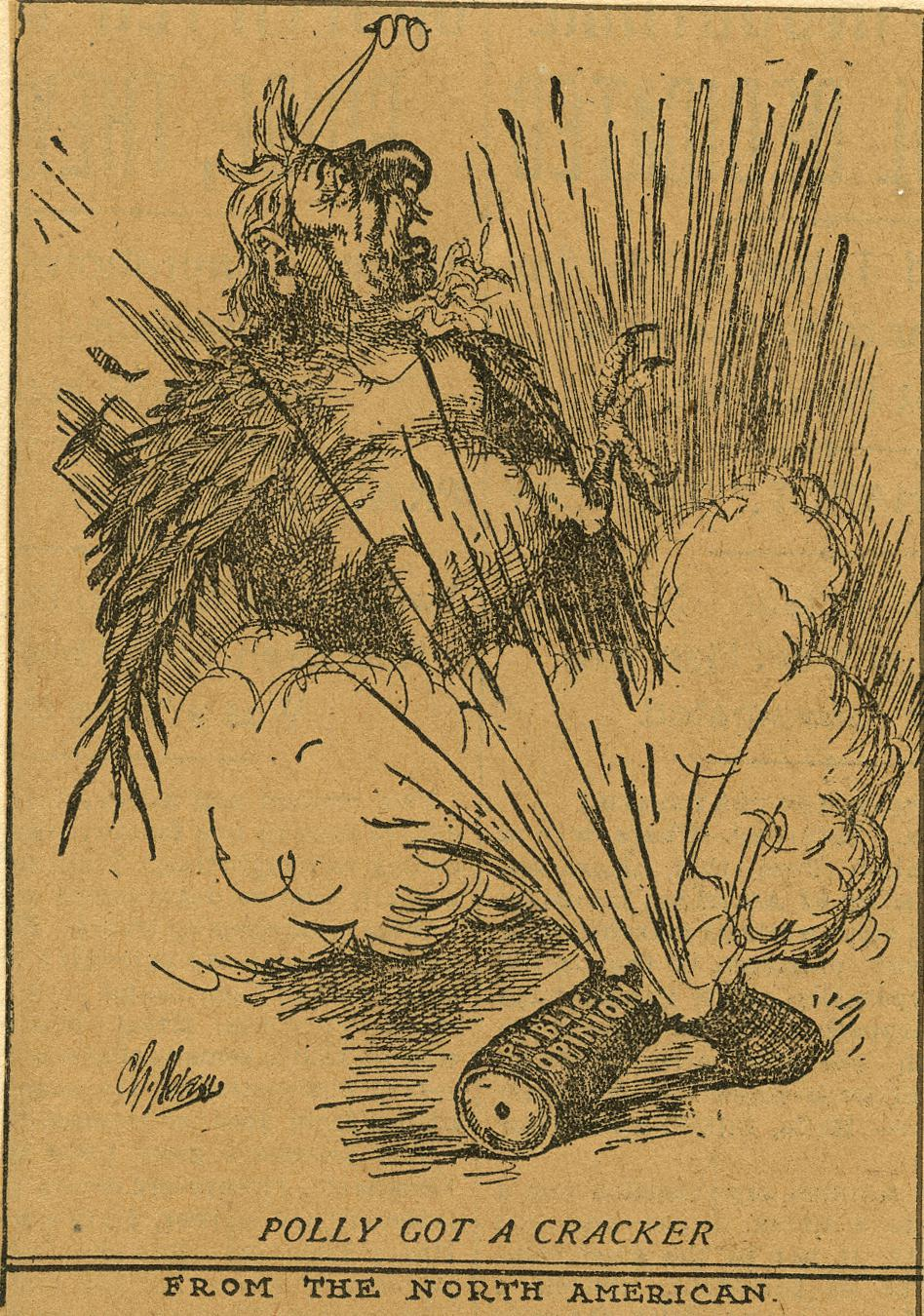
"Polly Got a Cracker" by Charles Nolan, Philadelphia North American, May 16, 1903

In 1906, Pennypacker vetoed what would have been the first compulsory sterilization law in the United States. At the time of the veto, Pennypacker stated:

It is plain that the safest and most effective method of preventing procreation would be to cut the heads off the inmates, and such authority is given by the bill to this staff of scientific experts...Scientists like all men whose experiences have been limited to one pursuit...sometimes need to be restrained. Men of high scientific attainments are prone...to lose sight of broad principles outside of their domain...To permit such an operation would be to inflict cruelty upon a helpless class...which the state has undertaken to protect..."

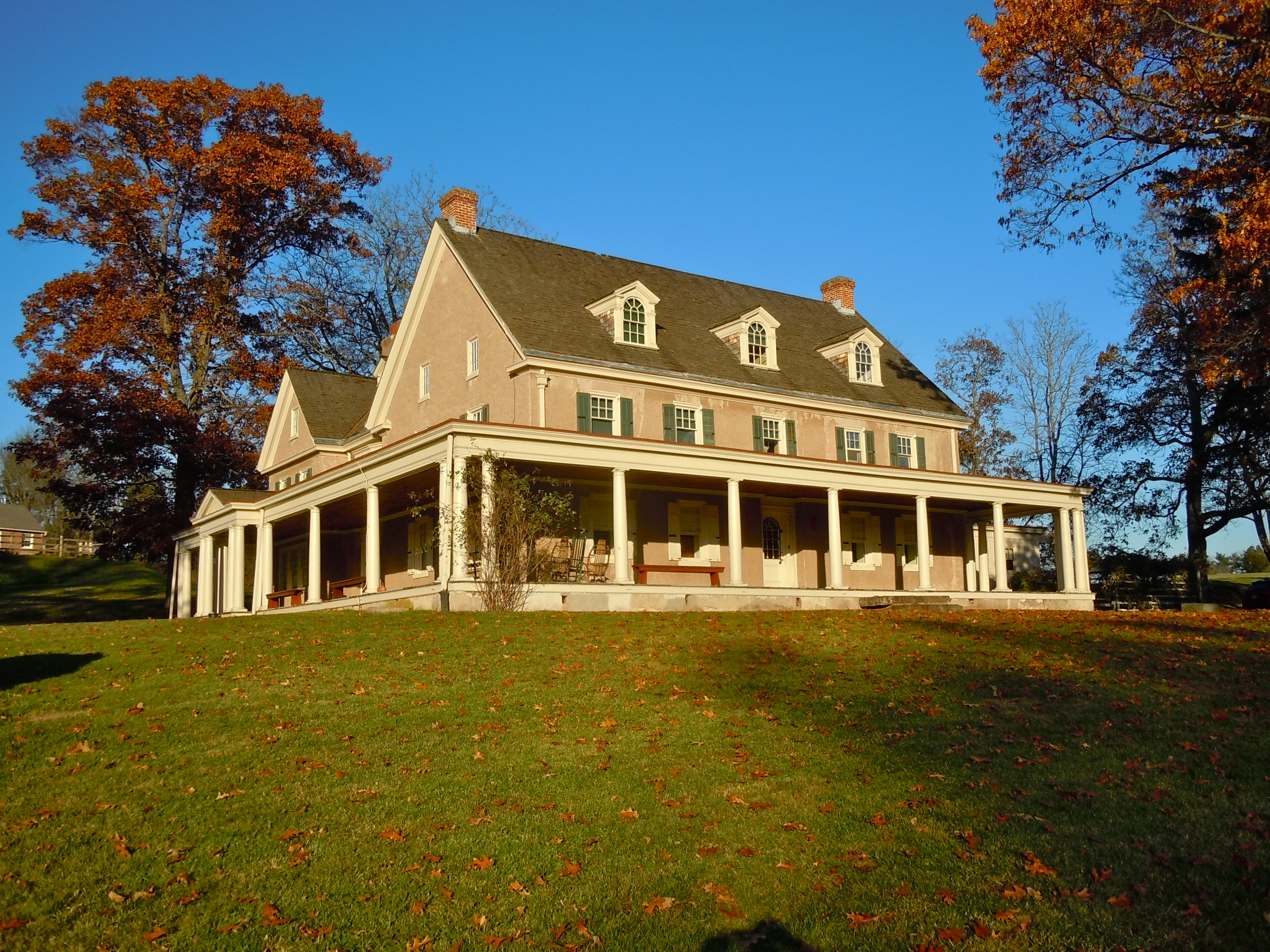
Pennypacker Mills

During his time in office, Pennypacker made his home in Schwenksville at Pennypacker Mills, a 170-acre (0.69 km^{2}) farm and mansion that eight generations of Pennypackers lived in before it was eventually donated to Montgomery County and is now a historic park. He also used Moore Hall as a summer home.

Pennypacker was later president of the Historical Society of Pennsylvania, a trustee of the University of Pennsylvania and held positions of honor in various German and Netherlandish societies. As president of the Historical Society of Pennsylvania, he wrote extensively. He was a founding member of the Philobiblon Club of Philadelphia in 1893. Amongst his publications was a history of the Phoenixville area, Annals of Phoenixville and Its Vicinity: From the Settlement to the Year 1871. He had a collection of over 10,000 items pertaining to Pennsylvania history. In 1915, he was appointed chairman of the Public Service Commission of Pennsylvania, which office he held until his death.

He married Virginia Earl Broomall in 1870. They had four children. He died at Pennypacker Mills, aged 73, and was buried in Morris Cemetery, Phoenixville. Pennypacker Hall at the Penn State University Park campus is named for him, as is the Samuel W. Pennypacker School in Philadelphia.

== Works ==
- Historical and biographical sketches (1883)
- The settlement of Germantown, Pennsylvania, and the beginning of German emigration to North America (1899)
- Pennsylvania in American History (1910)
- Desecration and Profanation of the Pennsylvania State Capitol (1911)
- The Autobiography of a Pennsylvanian (1918)

== Notes ==
Political offices
Preceded by William Stone	Governor of Pennsylvania; 1903–1907	Succeeded by Edwin Stuart
Party political offices
Preceded by William Stone	Republican nominee for Governor of Pennsylvania; 1902	Succeeded by Edwin Stuart
