= Thomas K. Bull =

American politician (1810–1893)

Member of the Pennsylvania House of Representatives from the Chester County district
- In office 1847–1849 Serving with George Ladley, Henry S. Evans, David J. Bent
- Preceded by: William Price, William D. Thomas, George Ladley
- Succeeded by: David J. Bent, John S. Bowen, John Acker

Personal details
- Born: July 23, 1810 Warwick Township, Chester County, Pennsylvania, U.S.
- Died: March 28, 1893 (aged 82) Warwick Township, Pennsylvania, U.S.
- Resting place: Saint Mary's Episcopal Church Cemetery, Warwick Township, Pennsylvania, U.S.
- Party: Whig; Republican
- Spouse: Julia H. Henderson (m. 1859)
- Relatives: Thomas Bull (grandfather)
- Education: Dickinson College
- Occupation: Politician

Thomas Kempis Bull (July 23, 1810 – March 28, 1893) was an American politician from Pennsylvania. He served as a member of the Pennsylvania House of Representatives, representing Chester County from 1847 to 1849.

== Early life ==
Thomas K. Bull was born to Levi Bull in 1810. His father was a lawyer and Episcopal clergyman. His grandfather Thomas Bull served in the Continental Army and served in the Pennsylvania House of Representatives. He graduated from Dickinson College.

== Career ==
Bull was a Whig. He served as a member of the Pennsylvania House of Representatives, representing Chester County from 1847 to 1849. He later joined the Republican Party.

Bull was an officer in the Pennsylvania State Militia.

== Personal life ==
Bull married Julia H. Henderson, daughter of Thomas Henderson, of Chester County on September 27, 1859. His brothers James and William were lawyers. He lived on the Bull family property on French Creek in Chester County.

Bull died on March 28, 1893, aged 82, at his home in Warwick Township.
