= Matthias Pennypacker =

American politician (1786–1852)

Member of the Pennsylvania House of Representatives from the Chester County district
- In office 1831–1831 Serving with Thomas Ashbridge, Arthur Andrews, Benjamin Griffith
- Preceded by: Joshua McMinn, Jesse James, Jesse Pugh, Matthew Stanley
- Succeeded by: Thomas Ashbridge, Arthur Andrews, Benjamin Griffith, Elijah F. Pennypacker
- In office 1827–1828 Serving with William Thompson, Townsend Haines, Robert Miller
- Preceded by: Joshua Hunt, David Potts Jr., John Chandler, William Thompson
- Succeeded by: Robert Miller, John Morgan, Isaac Trimble, Samuel McCleane

Personal details
- Born: August 15, 1786 Schuylkill Township, Chester County, Pennsylvania, U.S.
- Died: April 4, 1852 (aged 65) Chester County, Pennsylvania, U.S.
- Party: Whig
- Spouse: Sarah Anderson (m. 1807)
- Children: 5, including Matthias J.
- Relatives: Samuel W. Pennypacker (grandson); Galusha Pennypacker (great-grandson)
- Occupation: Politician; farmer; miller

Matthias Pennypacker (August 15, 1786 – April 4, 1852) was an American politician from Pennsylvania. He served as a member of the Pennsylvania House of Representatives, representing Chester County from 1827 to 1828 and in 1831.

== Early life ==
Matthias Pennypacker was born on August 15, 1786, at Pennypacker's Mill in Schuylkill Township, Chester County, Pennsylvania, to Mary (née Custer) and Matthias Pennypacker. His father was a farmer and a miller and was a preacher at a church in Phoenixville. Pennypacker grew up on the farm and was educated at subscription schools.

== Career ==
Pennypacker worked as a farmer and a miller. He operated a sawmill and was a lumber dealer.

Pennypacker was a Whig. He served as a member of the Pennsylvania House of Representatives, representing Chester County from 1827 to 1828 and in 1831. He was a member of the 1837 constitutional convention. In 1831, Pennypacker was one of the organizers of the Reading Company and was an incorporator of the Philadelphia & Reading Railroad.

== Personal life ==
In 1807, Pennypacker married Sarah Anderson, daughter of Isaac Anderson, of Schuylkill Township. They had four sons and one daughter, James A., Mary A., Isaac A., Washington and Matthias J. His son Matthias also served in the Pennsylvania House of Representatives. His grandson was Pennsylvania Governor Samuel W. Pennypacker. His great-grandson was Union General Galusha Pennypacker. Pennypacker was a Mennonite.

Pennypacker died on April 4, 1852, at his home on Pickering Creek in Chester County.
