= Persifor Frazer Smith (politician) =

American politician and lawyer (1808–1882)

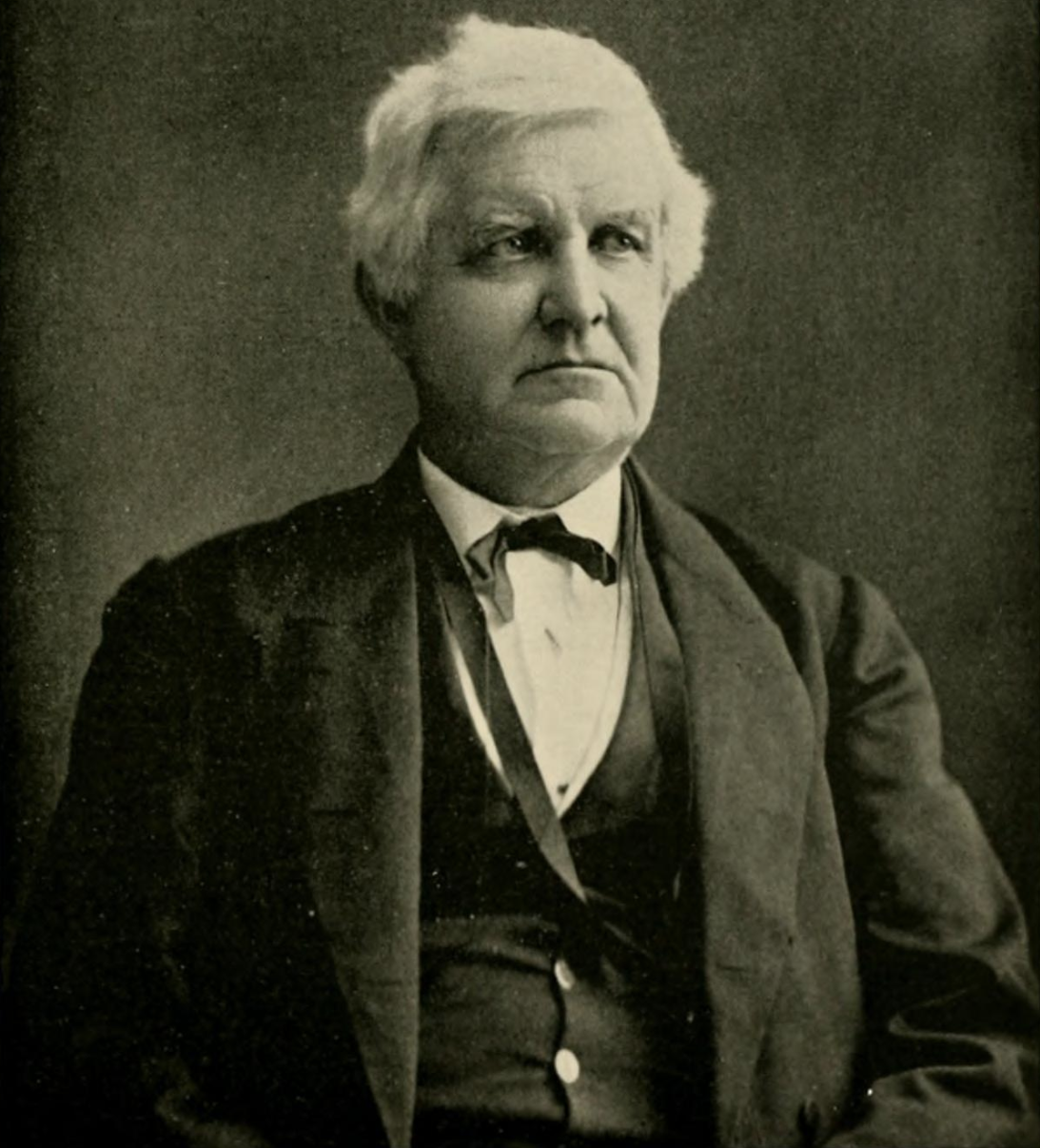
- Smith in a 1893 publication

Member of the Pennsylvania House of Representatives from the Chester County district
- In office 1862–1864 Serving with William Windle and Robert L. McClellan
- Preceded by: Isaac Acker, William T. Shafer, Caleb Pierce
- Succeeded by: William Bell Waddell, Nathan J. Sharpless, Nathan A. Pennypacker

Personal details
- Born: January 23, 1808 Philadelphia, Pennsylvania, U.S.
- Died: May 25, 1882 (aged 74) West Chester, Pennsylvania, U.S.
- Resting place: Oaklands Cemetery; West Chester, Pennsylvania, U.S.
- Party: Union Democrat (before 1862); Republican (1862 and after)
- Spouse: Thomasine S. Fairlamb (m. 1833)
- Children: 3, including George Fairlamb Smith
- Relatives: Persifor Frazer (grandfather)
- Education: University of Pennsylvania (AM)
- Occupation: Politician; lawyer

Persifor Frazer Smith (January 23, 1808 – May 25, 1882) was an American politician and lawyer from Pennsylvania. He served as a member of the Pennsylvania House of Representatives, representing Chester County from 1862 to 1864.

== Early life ==
Persifor Frazer Smith was born on January 23, 1808, in Philadelphia, Pennsylvania, to Mary (née Frazer) and Joseph Smith. His father was an iron shipping merchant in Philadelphia. His maternal grandfather Persifor Frazer served in the Continental Army. He attended schools in Philadelphia, including the classical schools of Samuel B. Wylie and Joseph P. Engle. He graduated from the University of Pennsylvania with a Master of Arts on July 31, 1824. After graduating, he moved with his father to East Whiteland Township, Chester County, Pennsylvania. In October 1826, he began studying law under William H. Dillingham and was admitted to the bar of Chester County in November 1829.

== Career ==
In December 1831, Smith was admitted to the Supreme Court of Pennsylvania and in October 1832 was admitted to the United States Court of Appeals for the Third Circuit. He was appointed clerk of the orphans' court of Chester County by Governor George Wolf in May 1835. On February 25, 1839, he was appointed prosecuting attorney for Delaware County, Pennsylvania, by Governor David R. Porter. In February 1849, he was admitted to practice before the Supreme Court of the United States.

Smith was a Union Democrat prior to 1862 and was then affiliated with the Republican Party. Smith was elected as a member of the Pennsylvania House of Representatives in 1861. He represented Chester County in that body from 1862 to 1864. He was supportive of the Union cause during the Civil War. In 1866, he was appointed state reporter of the Supreme Court of Pennsylvania. He held that role until his resignation in May 1876. He wrote the legal textbook Forms of Procedure. Smith continued to practice law until his death. At the time of his death, he worked as the Chester and Berks counties attorney for the Wilmington and Northern Railroad.

== Personal life ==
Smith married Thomasine S. Fairlamb, daughter of George A. Fairlamb, of Downingtown on July 24, 1833. He had at least three children, George Fairlamb, Persifor Frazer and Rebecca Darlington. His son George Fairlamb Smith was district attorney and a state legislator. His daughter Rebecca Darlington married Robert E. Monaghan, a state politician.

Smith died at the courthouse in West Chester, Pennsylvania, on May 25, 1882. He was interred at Oaklands Cemetery in West Chester.
