= Wayne =

Wayne may refer to:

== People with the given name and surname ==
- Wayne (given name)
- Wayne (surname)

== Geographical ==
Places with name Wayne may take their name from a person with that surname; the most famous such person was Gen. "Mad" Anthony Wayne from the former Northwest Territory during the American revolutionary period.

=== Places in Canada ===
- Wayne, Alberta

=== Places in the United States ===
Cities, towns and unincorporated communities:

- Wayne, Illinois
- Wayne City, Illinois
- Wayne, Indiana
- Wayne, Kansas
- Wayne, Maine
- Wayne, Michigan
- Wayne, Nebraska
- Wayne, New Jersey
- Wayne, New York
- Wayne, Ohio
- Wayne, Oklahoma
- Wayne, Pennsylvania
- Wayne, West Virginia
- Wayne, Lafayette County, Wisconsin
- Wayne, Washington County, Wisconsin
  - Wayne (community), Wisconsin

Other places:

- Wayne County (disambiguation)
- Wayne Township (disambiguation)
- Waynesborough, Gen. Anthony Wayne's early homestead in Pennsylvania
- Wayne National Forest in southeastern Ohio
- John Wayne Airport, Orange County, California
- Fort Wayne (disambiguation)

== Educational institutions ==
- Wayne State University, Michigan
- Wayne State College, Nebraska

== Other ==
- Diocese of Fort Wayne-South Bend
- Fountains of Wayne, American rock band from New York City
- Wayne's World, a recurring sketch on Saturday Night Live
  - Wayne's World (film) and Wayne's World 2, films based on the Saturday Night Live sketch
- Wayne Corporation, U.S. manufacturer of motor vehicles
- Wayne, car assembled by Byron F. Everitt, of E-M-F Company
- Wayne (band), metal band led by David Wayne
- Wayne (TV series), TV series on YouTube Premium
- Lil Wayne, American rapper from New Orleans, Louisiana
- Pauline Wayne, U.S. President William H. Taft's pet cow
- Typhoon Wayne (disambiguation)
- Wayne Oil Tank and Pump Company, part of Dresser Industries

== See also ==
- Wain (disambiguation)
- WAYN (disambiguation)
