= Wain (disambiguation) =

A wain is a farm wagon.

Wain may also refer to:

- Wain (surname)
- Wani (surname), or Wain, Kashmiri surname
- Wain (Württemberg), Germany

== See also ==
- Wayne (disambiguation)
- Wein
- WAYN (disambiguation)
- Waine
- The Haywain Triptych
- The Hay Wain
