= William Wayne =

American politician (1855–1933)

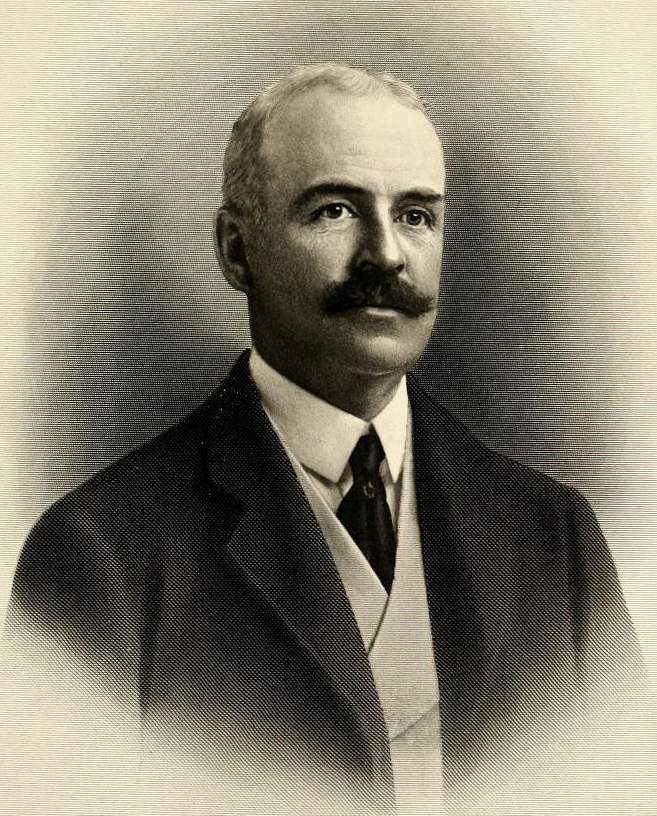
- Wayne in a 1904 publication

Member of the Pennsylvania House of Representatives from the Chester County district
- In office 1905–1906
- In office 1903–1904

Personal details
- Born: August 27, 1855 Waynesborough, Chester County, Pennsylvania, U.S.
- Died: February 14, 1933 (aged 77) Easttown Township, Pennsylvania, U.S.
- Party: Republican
- Spouse: Mary Valentine Fox (m. 1883)
- Children: 2
- Parent: William Wayne (father)
- Relatives: Isaac Wayne (great-great-uncle); Anthony Wayne (great-great-grandfather); Isaac Wayne (great-great-great-grandfather)
- Education: University of Pennsylvania
- Occupation: Politician
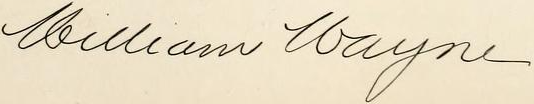
- Signature

William Wayne (August 27, 1855 – February 14, 1933) was an American politician from Pennsylvania. He served as a member of the Pennsylvania House of Representatives, representing Chester County from 1903 to 1904 and from 1905 to 1906.

== Early life ==
William Wayne was born on August 27, 1855, at Waynesborough in Chester County, Pennsylvania, to Hannah J. (née Zook) and William Wayne (his father was born as William Wayne Evans). His great-great-uncle was politician Isaac Wayne, his great-great-grandfather was Revolutionary War general Anthony Wayne and his great-great-great-grandfather was politician Isaac Wayne. He studied at schools in Philadelphia and attended Protestant Episcopal Academy. He graduated from the University of Pennsylvania in 1875.

== Career ==
Wayne was a farmer. He was a Republican. He served as a member of the Pennsylvania House of Representatives, representing Chester County from 1903 to 1904 and from 1905 to 1906. He ran for election in 1907, but lost.

Wayne was field secretary in France of the United States Red Cross during World War I.

== Personal life ==
Wayne married Mary Valentine Fox, daughter of George Fox, in 1883. They had two children, William (born 1884) and Edith Sarah (born 1889). He was a member of St. David's Episcopal Church in Radnor.

Wayne died on February 14, 1933, in Easttown Township.
