= Wayne (surname) =

Wayne is an old English surname meaning a craftsman: wagon driver or builder.

== Notable people with the surname "Wayne" include ==
- Anthony Wayne, general in the American colonial and United States armies
- Arthur Trezevant Wayne (1863–1930), American ornithologist
- Catie Wayne, Internet celebrity
- Charlie Wayne, UK musician
- David Wayne, American actor
- David Wayne (musician), American musician
- Don Wayne, American magic designer
- Don Wayne (songwriter), American country music songwriter
- Edward Johnson Wayne (1902–1990), British physician and professor of medicine
- Elsie Wayne, Canadian politician
- Fredd Wayne, American actor
- Gary Wayne, American baseball player
- Isaac Wayne (1772–1852), U.S. Congressman
- Isaac Wayne (1699–1774), Pennsylvania Provincial Assembly member, Captain in Pennsylvania Provincial Forces during the French and Indian War
- Jalen Wayne (born 1999), American football player
- James Moore Wayne, US congressman
- Jared Wayne (born 2000), Canadian American football player
- Jeff Wayne, American musician
- John Wayne, American actor
- Kenny "Blues Boss" Wayne (born 1944), American blues, boogie-woogie and jazz pianist, singer and songwriter
- Kyra Petrovskaya Wayne, Russian-American writer
- Leland Wayne, birth name of Metro Boomin, American record producer
- Naunton Wayne, British actor
- Olivia Wayne (born 1986), British sports journalist and television presenter
- Patrick Wayne, American actor
- Ralph Wayne (1932–2024), American politician
- Reggie Wayne, American football player
- Richard Wayne (died 1983), American murder victim
- Rick Wayne, St. Lucia media personality
- Ronald Wayne, American businessman
- Shannon Wayne, American politician
- William Wayne (1828–1901), American politician from Pennsylvania
- William Wayne (1855–1933), American politician from Pennsylvania

== Fictional characters ==
- Bruce Wayne, the secret identity of Batman
  - Thomas Wayne, the deceased father of Batman
  - Martha Wayne, the deceased mother of Batman
  - Damian Wayne, the son of Batman
