= Cabbagetown =

Cabbagetown may refer to:

- Cabbagetown, Toronto, Ontario, Canada
  - Cabbagetown, a novel by Hugh Garner
- Cabbagetown, Atlanta, Georgia, United States
- Waterloo Mills Historic District, known as Cabbage Town, in Chester County, Pennsylvania
