= Waynesboro =

Waynesboro is the name of some places in the United States of America:

- Waynesboro, Georgia
- Waynesboro, Mississippi
- Waynesboro, Pennsylvania
- Waynesboro, Tennessee
- Waynesboro, Virginia

== See also ==
- Waynesborough, historic home of General Anthony Wayne (1745-1796), in Paoli, Pennsylvania
- Goldsboro, North Carolina (formerly, Waynesborough)
