= SS Fort Wayne =

A number of steamships have been named Fort Wayne, including:

- SS Fort Wayne (1918)
- SS Fort Wayne (1945)
