= Fort Wayne (disambiguation) =

Fort Wayne is the second-largest city in the U.S. state of Indiana.

Fort Wayne may also refer to:

- Fort Wayne (Indiana fort), the fort which gave its name to the city of Fort Wayne
- Fort Wayne (Detroit), a fort in Michigan
- Fort Wayne (Indian Territory), two early frontier army forts in Indian Territory (now Oklahoma)
  - Battle of Old Fort Wayne
- USS Fort Wayne, a United States Navy transport during World War I
- Purdue Fort Wayne Mastodons, the athletic program of Purdue University Fort Wayne
