= Wein =

Wein means grape, vine, wine in German and Yiddish (װײַנ).

According to Nelly Weiss, Wein- style family names originated from signboards (house sign, house shield) in Jewish communities.

Notable people with the surname include:

- Albert Wein (1915–1991), American sculptor
- Berel Wein (1934–2025), Orthodox rabbi
- Desiderius Wein (1873–1944), Hungarian doctor and gymnast
- Elizabeth E. Wein (born 1964), American author residing in Scotland
- George Wein (1925–2021), jazz pianist
- Glynis Wein (born 1949), colorist in the comics industry, first wife of Len
- Len Wein (1948–2017), American comic book writer

== See also ==
- Der Wein, 1929 concert aria by Alban Berg
- Wein van Cotthem, Brussels clerk, chaplain and chronicler
- Wain
- Wien, the German name of the city of Vienna
- Wine
- Vine
