= Waine =

Waine is both a surname and a given name. Notable people with the name include:

== Surname ==
- Andy Waine (born 1983), English football player
- Ben Waine (born 2001), New Zealand born football player
- Emmanuel Waine
- Henry Waine
- John Waine (born 1930), Anglican bishop
- Stephen Waine (born 1959), Anglican priest
- Tammy Waine

== Given name ==
- Waine Bacon (born 1979), American football player
- Waine Pryce (born 1981), English-born Jamaican rugby league player

== See also ==
- Pennington v Waine, English trusts law case
- Wayne (disambiguation)
