= Waterloo Mills Historic District =

Historic district in Pennsylvania, United States

- U.S. National Register of Historic Places
- U.S. Historic district
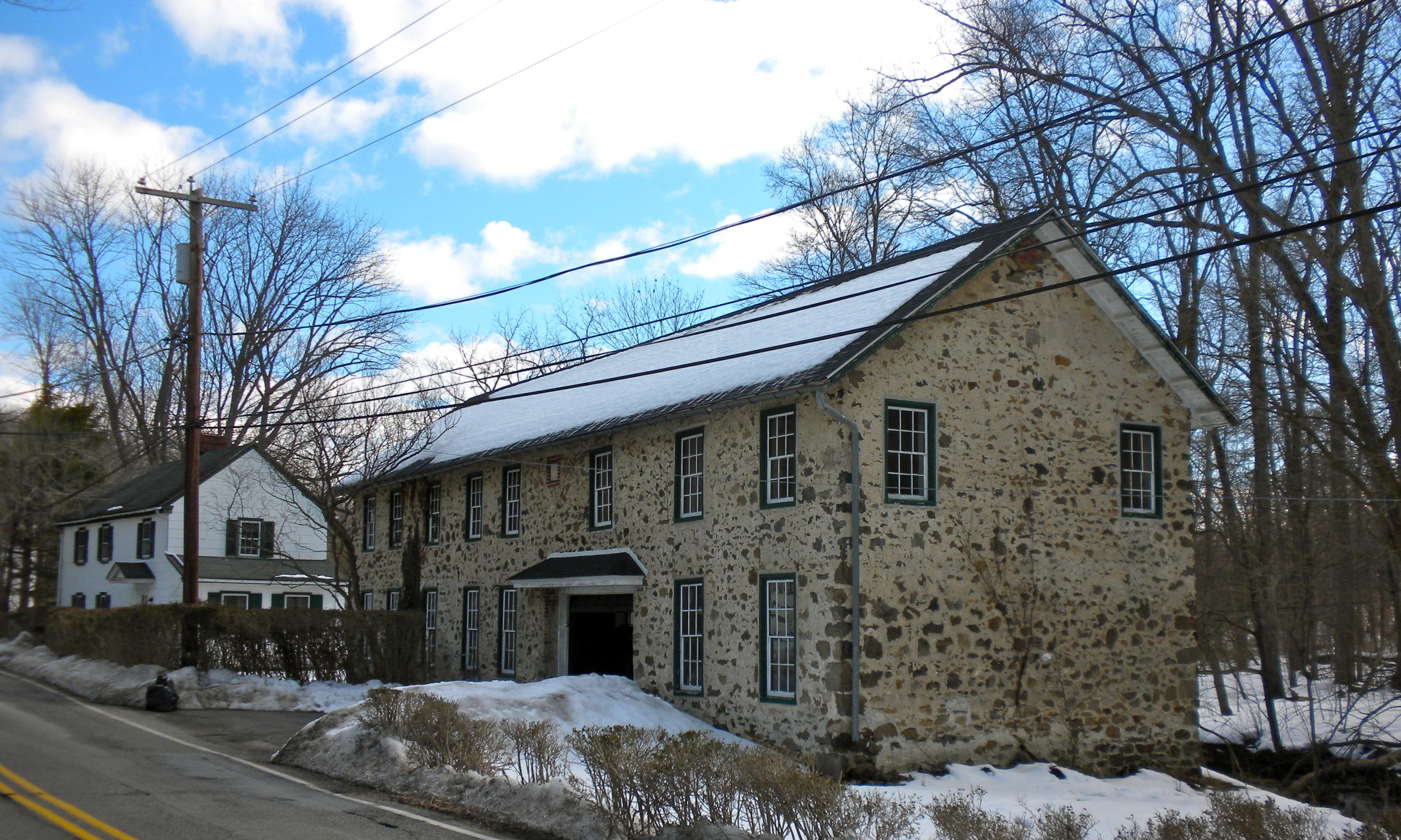
- Waterloo Mills Historic District, March 2010

- Location within Pennsylvania Location within the United States
- Interactive map showing the location of Waterloo Mills Historic District
- Location: 815, 840, 855 and 860 Waterloo Rd., Easttown Township, Pennsylvania
- Coordinates: 40°01′25″N 75°25′04″W
- Area: 159 acres (64 ha)
- Architectural style: Colonial
- NRHP reference No.: 95000889
- Added to NRHP: July 21, 1995

The Waterloo Mills Historic District, also known as Cabbage Town, is a national historic district that is located in Easttown Township, Chester County, Pennsylvania.

It was listed on the National Register of Historic Places in 1995.

== History and architectural features ==
This district encompasses eleven contributing buildings, one contributing site, and three contributing structures that are located in the crossroads village of Waterloo Mills. Most date to the nineteenth century and were primarily built using rubble fieldstone. They include the Davis/Gallagher farmhouse (c. 1800), the Waterloo Mill (1796-1798), the wheelwright/blacksmith shop (1891), three residences (1804, c. 1820, and c. 1830), a dairy barn (c. 1890), and several outbuildings. The district properties are owned by a single owner, who placed most of the land under protective easement in 1993.
