= Isaac Wayne =

American politician (1772–1852)

Member of the U.S. House of Representatives from Pennsylvania
- In office March 4, 1823 – March 3, 1825
- Constituency: 4th district (1823-1825)

Pennsylvania State Senate
- In office 1807 to 1810

Pennsylvania House of Representatives
- In office 1799 to 1801; 1806

Personal details
- Born: 1772 Easttown Township, Province of Pennsylvania, British America
- Died: October 25, 1852 (aged 79–80) Easttown Township, Pennsylvania, U.S.
- Resting place: St. David's Episcopal Church, Radnor, Pennsylvania, U.S.
- Party: Federalist Party
- Relatives: Anthony Wayne (father); Isaac Wayne (grandfather); Samuel Van Leer (uncle)
- Education: Dickinson College

Military service
- Branch/service: U.S. Army
- Years of service: 1812-1823
- Rank: Colonel
- Battles/wars: War of 1812

Isaac Wayne (1772 – October 25, 1852) was an American politician from Pennsylvania who served as a Federalist Party member of the U.S. House of Representatives for Pennsylvania's 4th congressional district from 1823 to 1825. He previously served as a member of the Pennsylvania House of Representatives from 1799 to 1801 and in 1806, and served as a member of the Pennsylvania State Senate from 1807 to 1810.

He was the son of the American Revolutionary War General Anthony Wayne, and grandson of Pennsylvania Provincial Assembly member Isaac Wayne.

== Biography ==
Wayne was born in 1772 at Waynesborough, the family estate in Easttown Township, Pennsylvania to American Revolutionary War General Anthony Wayne and Mary Penrose Wayne. He graduated from Dickinson College in Carlisle, Pennsylvania, in 1792, then studied law and was admitted to the Chester County, Pennsylvania, bar in 1795. He was a member of the Pennsylvania House of Representatives from 1799 to 1801 and 1806, and served in the Pennsylvania State Senate from 1807 to 1810.

During the War of 1812, Wayne was captain of a troop of Pennsylvania Horse Cavalry, raised and equipped by himself, and was subsequently colonel of the Second Regiment, Pennsylvania Volunteer Infantry.

Wayne unsuccessfully ran as a Federalist candidate for governor in 1814, but was elected to the Eighteenth Congress.

== Personal life ==
On August 25, 1802, Wayne married Elizabeth Smith and together they had five children.

In 1809, he traveled to Fort Presque Isle to disinter his father from his burial site there. The body was in surprisingly good shape and since no embalming was available at the time, the flesh was boiled off the bones and re-buried at Fort Presque Isle. He then transported his father's bones 300 miles East across Pennsylvania and reinterred them in St. David's Episcopal Church in Radnor, Pennsylvania.

In 1829, Wayne published a memoir of his father and his military career in The Casket.

In 1840, Wayne was elected as a member to the American Philosophical Society.

== Death and interment ==
Wayne died at the family estate in Easttown Township, Pennsylvania on October 25, 1852. He was buried in the family plot at St. David's Episcopal Church in Radnor, Pennsylvania.

== Bibliography ==
- Biographical Memoir of Major General Anthony Wayne, The Casket No. 5, pages 190–203, Philadelphia, May 1829

== Sources ==
- The Political Graveyard
- Encyclopedia Dickinsonia

Party political offices
Preceded by William Tilghman	Federalist nominee for governor of Pennsylvania; 1814	Succeeded by Joseph Hiester
U.S. House of Representatives
Preceded by James S. Mitchell	Member of the U.S. House of Representatives from Pennsylvania's 4th congressional district 1823–1825 alongside: James Buchanan and Samuel Edwards	Succeeded by James Buchanan; Samuel Edwards; Charles Miner
