= Isaac Wayne (1699–1774) =

Pennsylvania Provincial Assembly member

Member of the Pennsylvania Provincial Assembly
- In office 1757–1763

Personal details
- Born: 1699 County Wicklow, Ireland
- Died: November 1774 (aged 74–75) Easttown Township, Pennsylvania, Province of Pennsylvania
- Resting place: St. David's Episcopal Church, Radnor, Pennsylvania, U.S.
- Spouse: Elizabeth Iddings
- Relatives: Anthony Wayne (son); Isaac Wayne (grandson)
- Occupation: tanner, farmer

Military service
- Allegiance: Province of Pennsylvania
- Branch/service: Provincial Forces of Pennsylvania
- Years of service: 1755-1758
- Rank: Captain

Isaac Wayne (1699 – November 1774) was a member of the Pennsylvania Provincial Assembly representing Chester County from 1757 to 1763. He served as captain in the Provincial Forces of Pennsylvania during the French and Indian War from 1755 to 1758. As a civilian he operated a tannery. He is the father of American Revolutionary War General Anthony Wayne and grandfather of United States Congressman Isaac Wayne.

== Biography ==
Isaac Wayne was born in County Wicklow, Ireland in 1699 as the ninth child to Captain Anthony Wayne, veteran of the Battle of the Boyne. Anthony Wayne and family emigrated to the Province of Pennsylvania in British America and settled on a 1,600-acre (6.5 km^{2}) parcel of land in Easttown Township, Pennsylvania. Isaac stayed in England to finish his education and joined the family two years later.

Isaac was 40 years old when his parents deeded their estate to him under the condition that he was to pay an annuity to his parents for the remainder of their lives. Isaac built the stone home named Waynesborough which is now a designated historical site and open for public tours.

He built up the largest tannery in Pennsylvania, grew grain, and feed-crops. He served as a captain during the French and Indian War for the Provincial Forces of Pennsylvania from 1755 to 1756. He agreed to join the fight after General Edward Braddock was ambushed not far from Easttown Township. He raised a company of men out of Chester County and was commissioned captain. He aided in the defense of Northampton County, Pennsylvania and helped in the construction of Fort Allen. He was stationed at Nazareth, Monroe County and at Gnadden Hutten, a Moravian town at the current site of Allentown, Pennsylvania. In February, 1756, the company was disbanded but Wayne raised a second company which participated in the Forbes Expedition during 1757 and 1758.

He served as the representative for Chester County in the Pennsylvania Provincial Assembly from 1757 to 1763.

At the age of forty, he married Elizabeth Iddings and together they had four children:

- Anthony Wayne, a major general during the American Revolution
- Hannah, who married Samuel Van Leer, a Captain during the American Revolution, owner of a large Iron business and nearby historical homes.
- Ann, who married Capt. William Hayman
- Margaret, who married Col. Holstein

Wayne was an early patron of art from Benjamin West and purchased six chalk drawings done by West as a youth for $6.

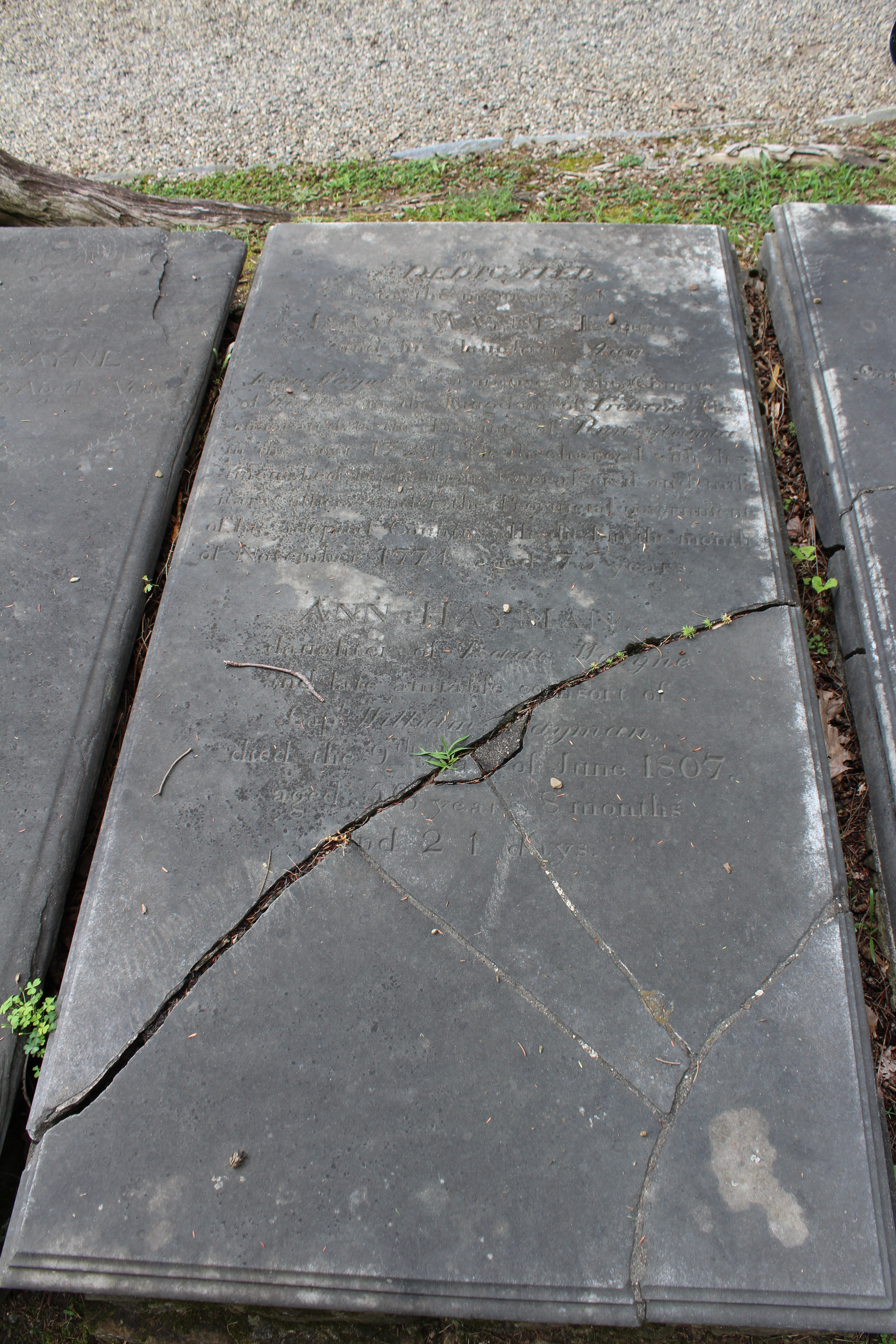
Isaac Wayne Tombstone in St. David's Episcopal Church Cemetery

Wayne died in November 1774 at Easttown Township, Pennsylvania and was interred in the graveyard of St. David's Episcopal Church in Radnor, Pennsylvania.
