= Easttown Township, Pennsylvania =

Township in Pennsylvania, US

Easttown Township
- Township
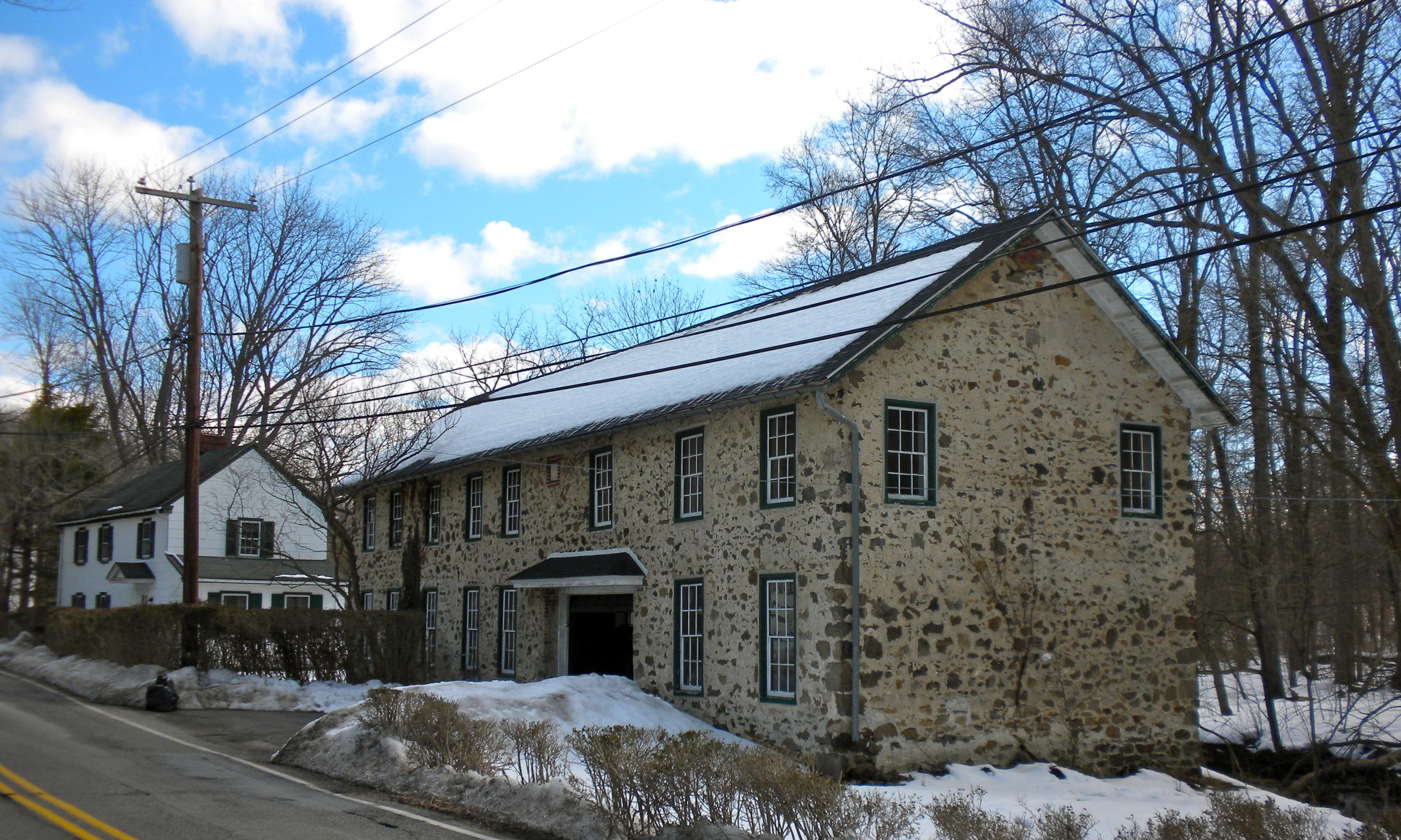
- Cabbage Town, Waterloo Mills

- Seal

- Location of Easttown Township in Chester County and of Chester County in Pennsylvania

- Location of Pennsylvania in the United States
- Coordinates: 40°02′08″N 75°26′22″W
- Country: United States
- State: Pennsylvania
- County: Chester
- Founded: Incorporated c. 1704

Area
  - Total: 8.27 sq mi (21.41 km^{2})
  - Land: 8.22 sq mi (21.30 km^{2})
  - Water: 0.042 sq mi (0.11 km^{2})
- Elevation: 417 ft (127 m)

Population (2020)
  - Total: 10,984
  - Estimate (2016): 10,594
  - Density: 1,288.0/sq mi (497.29/km^{2})
- Time zone: UTC-5 (EST)
  - Summer (DST): UTC-4 (EDT)
- Area code: 610
- FIPS code: 42-029-21928
- Website: www.easttown.org

Easttown Township is a township in Chester County, Pennsylvania, United States. The population was 10,984 at the 2020 census. The township, which lies in the western half of Philadelphia's Main Line suburbs, comprises predominantly parts of two unincorporated areas: Devon and Berwyn. A small portion of the township has a Paoli address.

== History ==
The land that eventually became Easttown Township was once part of the Welsh Tract, a large expanse of land promised by William Penn to a group of Welsh Quaker settlers in which they would be able to speak and conduct business in the Welsh language. Whilst the autonomous entity envisaged by some was never formed, it left its mark in the many Welsh place names that still exist, such as the census-designated place (CDP) Berwyn in Easttown and adjacent Tredyffrin Township. The township is believed to have been incorporated in 1704 since that is the earliest date it has been found to be referred to in official records. However, a delineated community of that name appears in Thomas Holme's c. 1687 map.

Whilst the originators of the Welsh Tract were Quakers, the earliest settlers in the portion that became Easttown Township were mostly Anglicans. St. David's Episcopal Church, just past the eastern edge of the township, was constructed in 1715 by Welsh Anglicans when the original church sent them a minister.

Revolutionary War leader Anthony Wayne was born and lived in Waynesborough house, in the western part of the township. He—or at least part of him—is buried at St. David's.

A Revolutionary War skirmish that occurred along a ridge in the center of the township was the only engagement of that war in the township. The name of the British commander, Banastre Tarleton, was later given to a nearby mansion: Tarleton.

Two sites in the township are listed on the National Register of Historic Places: Waynesborough and Roughwood. The cluster of buildings that forms the village of Leopard, identified as a 'Significant Historic Cluster' in the Chester County Historic Sites Survey (1979–1982), is eligible for listing as well. In addition, the Waterloo Mills Historic District has been designated. Although St. David's Church is just over the line in Newtown Township, the church building and its graveyard (most of which is in Easttown) are listed together in the National Register.

Easttown, along with neighboring Tredyffrin Township, was the site of the Berwyn School Fight, a boycott and legal campaign by local Black families to resist attempts to segregate public schools by race.

Easttown Township is said to have the most-litigated zoning law in Pennsylvania, largely as a result of its efforts to avoid being swallowed up by the expansion of the suburbs of Philadelphia. At least two major cases about minimum lot size were handed down by the Pennsylvania Supreme Court: the landmark case Bilbar Construction in 1958 upheld the township's minimum lot sizes, while National Land and Investment Co. struck them down as 'exclusionary' seven years later. National Land further held that a municipality may utilize zoning measures that are substantially related to the protection and preservation of the municipality's proper interest in providing for the general welfare of its residents, but Easttown's zoning did not pass the test. Ironically, despite the developer-litigants' claimed interest in allowing poor people to live in Easttown, they built only houses that sold at well over the average value in Pennsylvania.

== Geography ==
According to the United States Census Bureau, the township has a total area of 8.2 square miles (21 km^{2}), of which 0.12% is water.

The township is bordered by Radnor township (to the east), Tredyffrin township (to the north), Willistown township (to the west) and Newtown township (to the south).

== Demographics ==
Historical population
| Census | Pop. | Note | %± |
|---|---|---|---|
| 1930 | 2,570 | | — |
| 1940 | 2,552 | | −0.7% |
| 1950 | 3,811 | | 49.3% |
| 1960 | 6,907 | | 81.2% |
| 1970 | 9,565 | | 38.5% |
| 1980 | 9,064 | | −5.2% |
| 1990 | 9,570 | | 5.6% |
| 2000 | 10,270 | | 7.3% |
| 2010 | 10,477 | | 2.0% |
| 2020 | 10,984 | | 4.8% |

According to the 2025 American Community Survey's five-year population estimates, the township was 81% non-Hispanic White, 1% Black or African American, 0% Native American and 13% Asian. 5% of residents reported two or more races and 3% of the population were of Hispanic or Latino ancestry. 13% of residents were foreign-born.

There were 11,164 people and 3,992 households residing in the township. The population density was 1,334 people per square mile. 88% of units were single-family homes and 78% of households were headed by a married couple. The average household size was 2.7.

The median income for a household in the township was $214,861, the second highest among municipalities in Pennsylvania with a population exceeding 5,000 residents. The per capita income for the township was $97,474. The median family income was $229,722. Among families with children, the median household income was higher than $250,000. The average income for a family was $316,306.

80.4% of residents over the age of 25 hold a bachelor's degree and 44% of the township's residents have earned a graduate degree.

The median value of owner-occupied housing units was $852,800, the second highest among municipalities in the state of Pennsylvania with a population over 5,000 residents. According to Philadelphia Magazine, the median price among homes sold in the township in 2025 was $1.1 million.

== Transportation ==
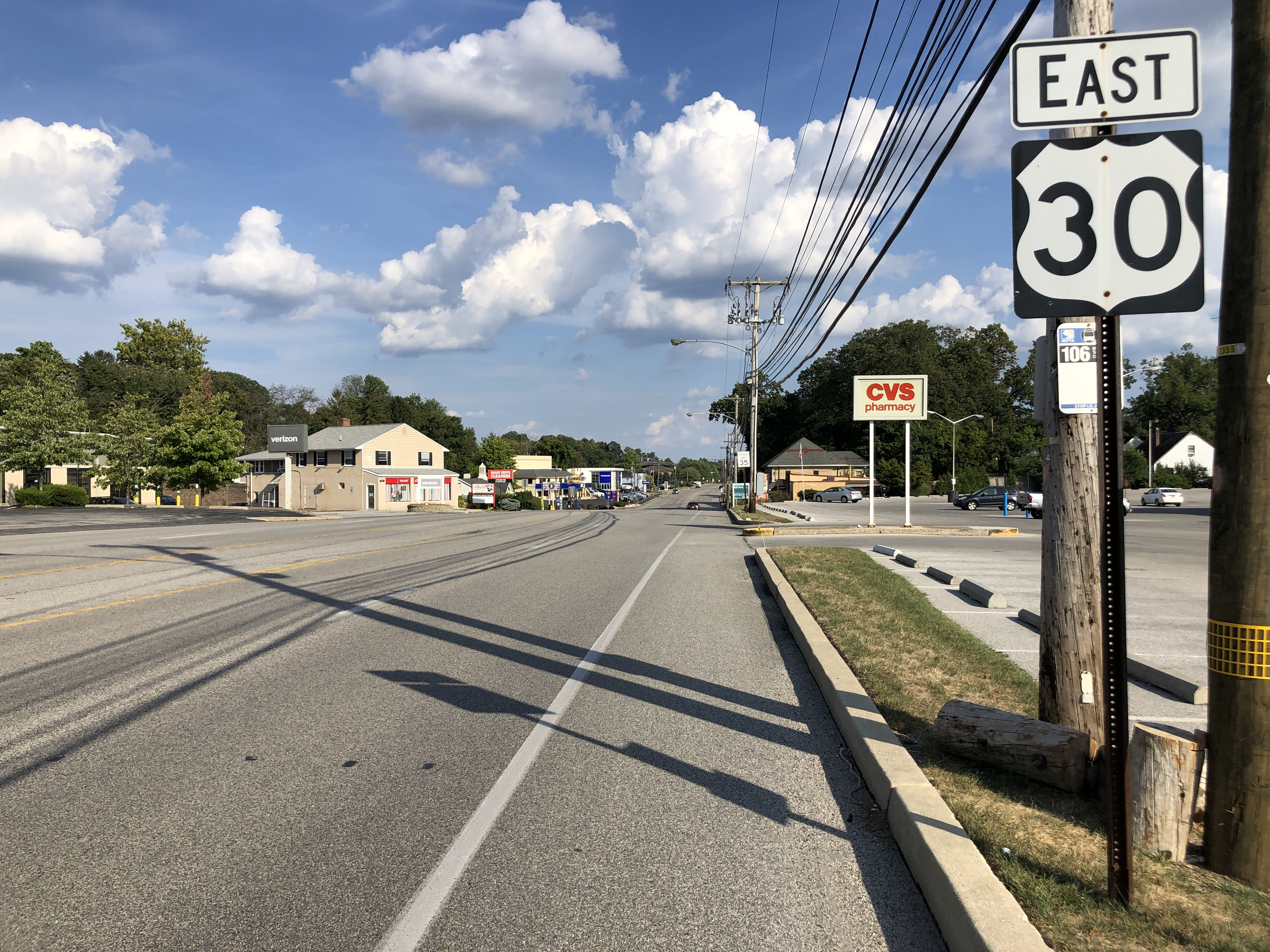
US 30 eastbound in Easttown Township

As of 2018, there were 66.66 miles (107.28 km) of public roads in Easttown Township, of which 18.66 miles (30.03 km) were maintained by the Pennsylvania Department of Transportation (PennDOT) and 48.00 miles (77.25 km) were maintained by the township.

U.S. Route 30 and Pennsylvania Route 252 are the numbered highways serving Easttown Township. US 30 follows Lancaster Avenue along an east–west alignment through the northern part of the township, while PA 252 follows Darby-Paoli Road and Leopard Road along a northwest–southeast alignment through the western and southern portions of the township.

== Government ==
The township is governed by a Board of Supervisors. The present board consists of:

- Erik Unger
- Michael Wacey
- Sean Axel
- Alex Bosco
- Susan Leboutillier

== Education ==
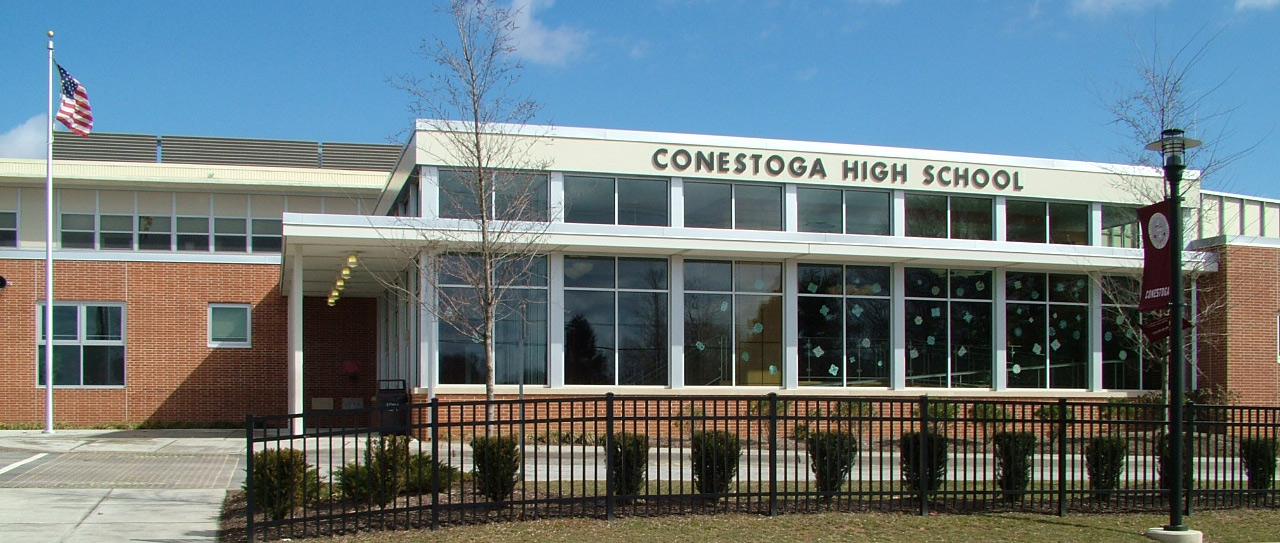
Conestoga High School

Easttown Township lies within the Tredyffrin/Easttown School District. Students residing within township boundaries attend Conestoga High School for grades 9-12. Hillside Elementary School, Beaumont Elementary School and Devon Elementary school serve students in grades K-4. Tredyffrin/Easttown Middle School and Valley Forge Middle School serve students in grades 5–8.

Tarleton School, a private elementary school, is located on Waterloo Avenue.

The Roman Catholic Archdiocese of Philadelphia manages area Catholic schools. St. Norbert School is in the township, and is outside of the Paoli CDP, but has a Paoli mailing address. It was established in 1956, with the school building built the following year. In 2012 the Catholic grade school St. Monica in Berwyn closed.

Easttown Township has its own public library.

== Parks ==
The township has two parks, Hilltop Park and Frank Johnson Memorial Park. Hilltop, with a Devon address but outside of the Devon CDP, has a pavilion with toilets, a picnic area, two soccer fields, a "tot lot", and trails for walking purposes. Johnson, in the Berwyn CDP, has a pavilion with toilets, basketball courts, an open field, a "tot lot", and volleyball courts.

== Notable people ==
- Isaac Van Leer (1772–1821), ironmaster
- Anthony Wayne (1745–1796), United States Army officer, statesman, member of the United States House of Representatives
- Isaac Wayne (1772–1852), U.S. Congressman
- Isaac Wayne (1699–1774), Member of the Pennsylvania Provincial Assembly, Captain for the Pennsylvania Provincial Forces during the French and Indian War

== Media ==
The HBO miniseries Mare of Easttown, which premiered on April 18, 2021, is set in a fictionalized version of Easttown Township, although it moves the location to neighboring Delaware County. The series was filmed in surrounding communities in southeastern Pennsylvania but not within Easttown Township itself. Series creator Brad Ingelsby was born and raised in Berwyn, which is partially located in Easttown Township.
