= Anthony Wayne =

American statesman and soldier (1745–1796)

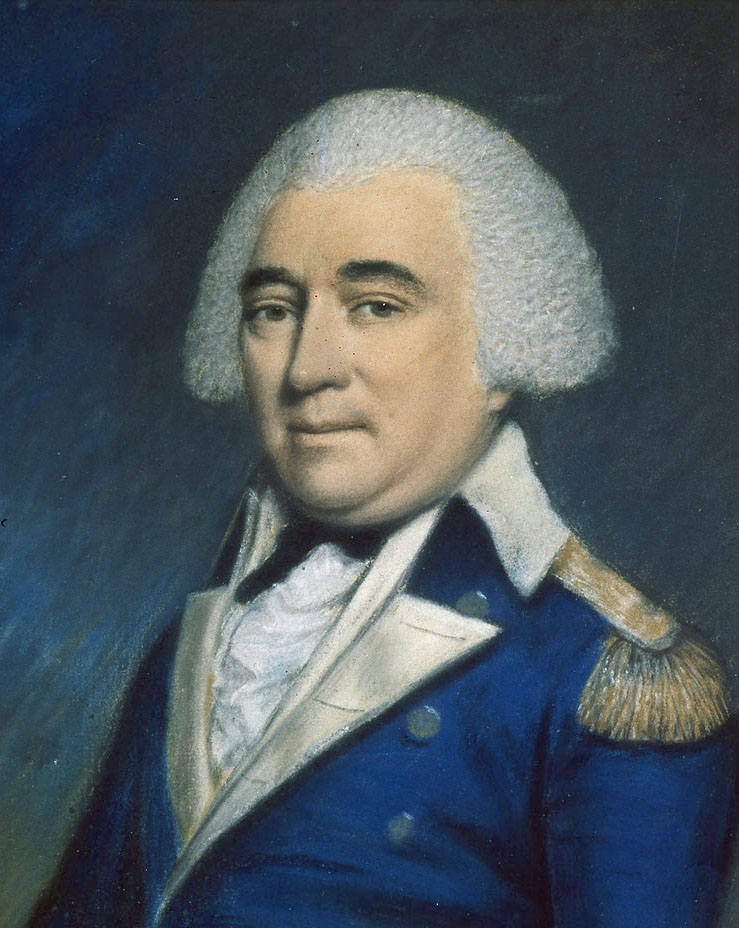
- Anthony Wayne (1745-1796). (Pastel by James Sharples, Sr., c. 1795; Independence National Historical Park.)

5th Senior Officer of the United States Army
- In office April 13, 1792 – December 15, 1796
- President: George Washington
- Preceded by: Arthur St. Clair
- Succeeded by: James Wilkinson

Member of the U.S. House of Representatives from Georgia's 1st district
- In office March 4, 1791 – March 21, 1792
- Preceded by: James Jackson
- Succeeded by: John Milledge

Legislature Member of the Pennsylvania Assembly
- In office 1774–1775

Personal details
- Born: January 1, 1745 Easttown Township, Province of Pennsylvania, British America
- Died: December 15, 1796 (aged 51) Fort Presque Isle, Erie, Pennsylvania, U.S.
- Resting place: Fort Presque Isle, Erie, Pennsylvania, U.S. and St. David's Episcopal Church, Radnor, Pennsylvania, U.S.
- Party: Anti-Administration party
- Spouse: Mary Penrose (m. 1763)
- Children: 2, including Isaac
- Parent: Isaac Wayne (father)
- Relatives: William Wayne (great-grandson); William Wayne (great-great-grandson); Blake Wayne Van Leer; Jonwayne; Samuel Van Leer (brother-in-law)
- Education: College of Philadelphia
- Occupation: Soldier
- Nickname: Mad Anthony

Military service
- Allegiance: United States
- Branch/service: Pennsylvania Militia; Continental Army; United States Army
- Years of service: Continental Army (1775–1783); United States Army (1792–1796)
- Rank: Major general
- Battles/wars: American Revolutionary War; Battle of Trois-Rivières; Battle of Brandywine; Battle of Paoli; Battle of Germantown; Battle of Monmouth; Battle of Stony Point (WIA); Battle of Bull's Ferry; Battle of Green Spring; Northwest Indian War; Siege of Fort Recovery; Battle of Fallen Timbers

Anthony Wayne (January 1, 1745 – December 15, 1796) was an American soldier, officer, statesman, and a Founding Father of the United States. He adopted a military career at the outset of the American Revolutionary War, where his military exploits and fiery personality quickly earned him a promotion to brigadier general and the nickname "Mad Anthony". He later served as the Senior Officer of the Army on the Ohio Country frontier and led the Legion of the United States.

Wayne was born in Chester County, Pennsylvania, and worked as a tanner and surveyor after attending the College of Philadelphia. He was elected to the Pennsylvania General Assembly and helped raise a Pennsylvania militia unit in 1775. During the Revolutionary War, he served in the Invasion of Quebec, the Philadelphia campaign, and the Yorktown campaign. Although his reputation suffered after his defeat in the 1777 Battle of Paoli, he won wide praise for his leadership in the 1779 Battle of Stony Point and was awarded the Congressional Gold Medal. Soon after being promoted to major general in 1783, he retired from the Continental Army. Anthony Wayne was a member of the Society of the Cincinnati of the state of Georgia. In 1780, he was elected to the American Philosophical Society.

After the war, Wayne held a brief career in congress and private business. Following St. Clair's defeat, Wayne was recalled by President Washington from civilian life to command of U.S. forces in the Northwest Indian War, where he defeated the Northwestern Confederacy, an alliance of several American Indian tribes. Leading up to the war, Wayne oversaw a major change and reorganization of the entire United States Army. Following the 1794 Battle of Fallen Timbers, he later negotiated the Treaty of Greenville which ended the war and the tribes’ alliance with the British Empire. In the 21st century, Wayne's legacy has become controversial due to his ownership of slaves and his participation in the ethnic cleansing of Native Americans during the Northwest Indian War.

== Early life ==
Wayne was born on January 1, 1745, on his family's 500-acre (200 ha) Waynesborough estate. A member of the landed gentry, he was one of four children born to Isaac Wayne, who had immigrated to Easttown, Pennsylvania, from Ireland, and Elizabeth Iddings Wayne. He was part of a Protestant Anglo-Irish family; his grandfather was a veteran of the Battle of the Boyne, where he fought for the Williamite side.

During his upbringing, Wayne clashed with his father's desires that he become a farmer. As a child, his father served as a captain during the French and Indian War, leaving an impression on Wayne who would mimic stories of battles at the time. He was educated as a surveyor at his uncle's private academy in Philadelphia and at the College of Philadelphia for two years. In 1765, Benjamin Franklin sent him and some associates to work for a year surveying land granted in Nova Scotia, where he surveyed 100,000 acres. He assisted with starting a settlement the following year at The Township of Monckton and was involved with preparing the infrastructure to last through winters.

He married Mary Penrose in 1763, and they had two children. Their daughter, Margretta, was born in 1770, and their son, Isaac Wayne, was born in 1772. Wayne had romantic relationships with other women throughout his life, including Mary Vining, a wealthy woman in Delaware, eventually causing his wife becoming estranged from him. He later became a U.S. representative from Pennsylvania. Wayne was an avid reader and often quoted Caesar and Shakespeare at length while serving in the military.

In 1767, he returned to work in his father's tannery while continuing work as a surveyor. As discontent with the British grew in the Thirteen Colonies, Wayne stepped into the political limelight locally and was elected chairman of the Chester County Committee of Safety and then to the Pennsylvania Provincial Assembly.

== American Revolution ==
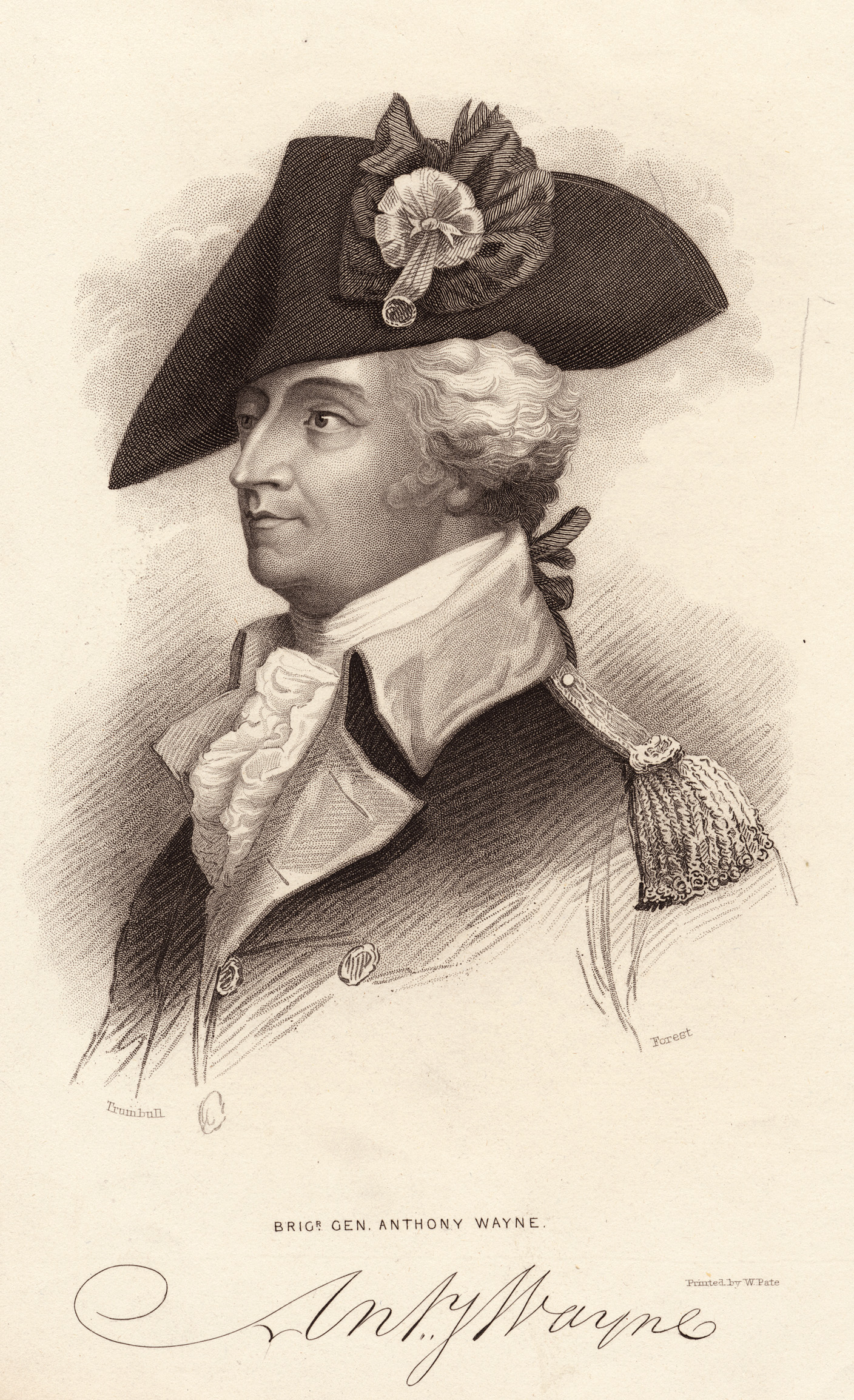
18th-century print of Wayne

In 1775, Wayne was nominated to the Pennsylvania Committee of Safety, where he served along with three other Pennsylvania committee members, John Dickinson, Benjamin Franklin, and Robert Morris. Following Parliament's enactment of the Intolerable Acts, Wayne began to support the Patriot cause and by October 1775, his chairman position for the Chester County Committee of Safety was replaced by a Quaker as citizens described him as a "radical", an accusation Wayne denied. On January 3, 1776, Wayne was nominated as colonel of the 4th Pennsylvania Regiment by the Pennsylvania delegation of the Second Continental Congress. The poor supplies and controversies between his regiment and the Pennsylvania assembly would later influence Wayne to support the centralization of government.

=== American Revolutionary War ===
Wayne discarded the conventional tactics of line warfare, stating "the only good lines are those nature made", and instead focused on maneuver warfare and strict discipline. He and his regiment were part of the Continental Army's unsuccessful invasion of Quebec where he was sent to aid Benedict Arnold. Wayne commanded a successful rear-guard action at the Battle of Trois-Rivières and then led the forces on Lake Champlain at Fort Ticonderoga and Mount Independence. His service led to his promotion to brigadier general on February 21, 1777. Some historians claim Wayne's nickname "Mad Anthony" came from his military tactics from the Battle of Green Spring in Virginia, which his men barely escaped an outnumbered British force with a bayonet charge. Others claim it was from his quick temper and what historians label "off-color language," specifically during an incident when he severely punished a skilled informant for being drunk.

On September 11, 1777, Wayne commanded the Pennsylvania Line at the Battle of Brandywine, where they held off General Wilhelm von Knyphausen's troops in order to protect the American right flank. The two forces fought for three hours until the American line withdrew and Wayne was ordered to retreat. He was then ordered to harass the British rear in order to slow General William Howe's advance towards Pennsylvania. Wayne's camp was attacked on the night of September 20–21 in the Battle of Paoli. British General Charles Grey had ordered his men to remove their flints and attack with bayonets in order to keep their assault secret. The battle earned Grey the sobriquet of "General Flint", but Wayne's own reputation was tarnished by the significant American losses, and he demanded a formal inquiry in order to clear his name. On October 4, 1777, Wayne again led his forces against Howe's army in the Battle of Germantown. His soldiers pushed ahead of other units, and the British "pushed on with their Bayonets—and took Ample Vengeance" as they retreated according to Wayne's report. Wayne and General John Sullivan advanced too rapidly and became entrapped when they were two miles (3.2 km) ahead of other American units. They retreated as Howe arrived to re-form the British line. Wayne was again ordered to hold off the British and cover the rear of the retreating body.

After winter quarters at Valley Forge, Wayne led the attack at the 1778 Battle of Monmouth, where his forces were abandoned by General Charles Lee and were pinned down by a numerically superior British force. Wayne held out until relieved by reinforcements sent by General George Washington. He then re-formed his troops and continued to fight. The body of British Lt. Colonel Henry Monckton was discovered by the 1st Pennsylvania Regiment, and a legend grew that he had died fighting Wayne. Wayne also set an example for coping with adversity during military operations. In October 1778, Wayne wrote of the brutal cold and lack of appropriate supplies, "During the very severe storm from Christmas to New Year's, whilst our people lay without any cover except their old tents, and when the drifting of snow prevented the green wood from taking fire." Through these tough conditions, Wayne wrote that he sought to keep his soldiers "well and comfortable."

In January 1779, Wayne was staying at the home of Abraham Van Neste, owner of the mills at the site of the Battle of Millstone, along with his subordinate soldiers. Following an argument one night between Wayne's Aide-de-camp, Benjamin Fishbourn, and Van Neste, Van Neste was assaulted. Wayne prevented a local constable from serving process on the subordinate. General Washington was brought into the situation by the Governor of New Jersey, William Livingston, to help resolve the situation. In July 1779, Washington named Wayne to command the Corps of Light Infantry, a temporary unit of four regiments of light infantry companies drawn from all the regiments in the main army. His successful attack on British positions in the Battle of Stony Point was the highlight of his Revolutionary War service. On July 16, 1779, he replicated the attack used against him at Paoli and personally led a nighttime bayonet attack lasting 30 minutes. His three columns of about 1,500 light infantry stormed and captured British fortifications at Stony Point, a cliff-side redoubt commanding the southern Hudson River. The battle ended with around 550 prisoners taken, with fewer than 100 casualties for Wayne's forces. Wayne was wounded during the attack when a British musket ball gashed his scalp. The success of this operation provided a small boost to the morale of the army, which had suffered a series of military defeats, and the Continental Congress awarded him a medal for the victory.

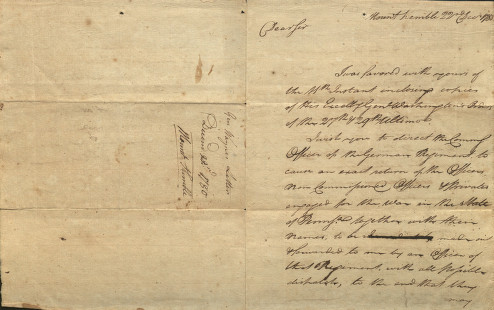
1780 letter from Wayne to Israel Shreve

On July 21, 1780, Washington sent Wayne with two Pennsylvania brigades and four cannons to destroy a blockhouse at Bulls Ferry opposite New York City in the Battle of Bull's Ferry. Wayne's troops were unable to capture the position, suffering 64 casualties while inflicting 21 casualties on the Loyalist defenders. On January 1, 1781, Wayne served as commanding officer of the Pennsylvania Line of the Continental Army when pay and condition concerns led to the Pennsylvania Line Mutiny, one of the most serious of the war. He successfully resolved the mutiny by dismissing about half the line. He returned the Pennsylvania Line to full strength by May 1781. This delayed his departure to Virginia, however, where he had been sent to assist General Lafayette against British forces operating there. The line's departure was delayed once more when the men complained about being paid in the nearly worthless Continental currency.

On July 4, General Charles Cornwallis departed Williamsburg for Jamestown, planning to cross the James River en route to Portsmouth. Lafayette believed he could stage an attack on Cornwallis' rear guard during the crossing. Cornwallis anticipated Lafayette's plan and laid an elaborate trap. Wayne led a small scouting force of 500 in 1781 at the Battle of Green Spring to determine the location of Cornwallis, and they fell into the trap; only a bayonet charge against the numerically overwhelming British force enabled his troops to retreat. The action reinforced the perception among contemporaries that justified the moniker "Mad" to describe Wayne. During the Yorktown campaign, Wayne was shot in the leg; the lead musket ball was never removed from his leg.

After Cornwallis' army surrendered at Yorktown, Wayne went south to Georgia where in concert with Nathanael Greene he maintained a military observation of British-held Savannah. During this period, he unsuccessfully demanded on behalf of Georgia's citizens that the British return the American slaves who had fled to freedom on British-held Tybee Island. With the goal of establishing peace between the United States and Muscogee, Wayne captured several Muscogee warriors and proceeded to release them in order to establish goodwill. Fearing an attack from Loyalist forces under Lieutenant-colonel Thomas Brown in Savannah, Wayne made camp and prepared for a confrontation. Unbeknownst to him, Brown had persuaded the Muscogee to attack Wayne. A force of Muscogee warriors ambushed his camp at night, which woke Wayne. Assuming another bayonet-style ambush as had happened at Paoli, Wayne alerted his soldiers to arm themselves and prepare to die with him, and the Muscogee attack was repelled. He eventually negotiated peace treaties with both the Muscogee and Cherokee during a bout with malaria, for which Georgia purchased a slave plantation for 4,000 guineas and rewarded it to him. Wayne would suffer from complications related to malaria for the remainder of his life.

== Civilian and political life ==
=== Pennsylvania ===
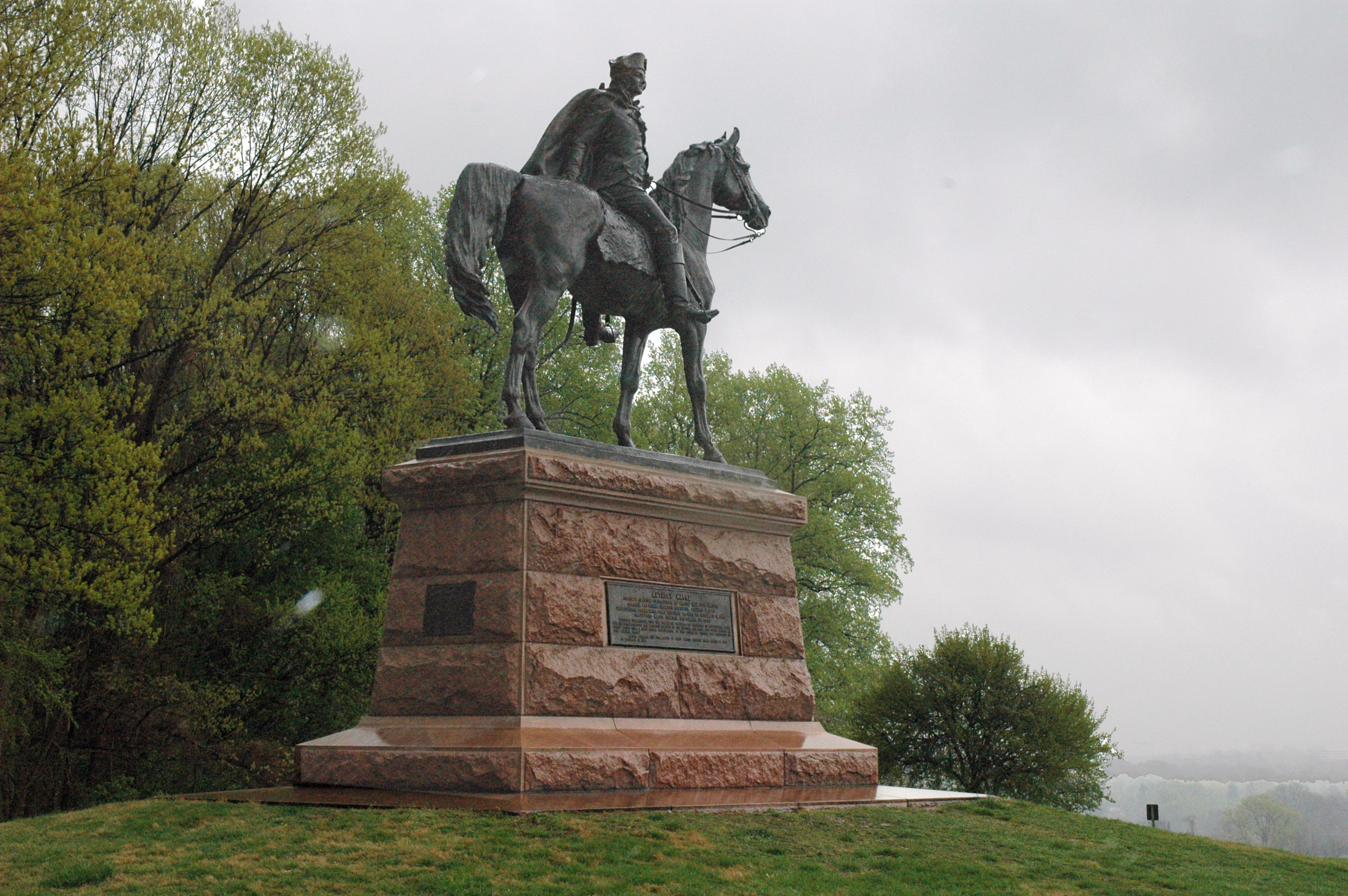
Statue of Wayne at Valley Forge, facing toward his home in nearby Paoli, Pennsylvania

In 1783, Wayne returned to Pennsylvania and was celebrated as a hero, deciding to enter politics with other conservative friends at the time. Initially a supporter of democracy, Wayne ultimately grew more authoritarian, believing that the United States should be an aristocracy, supporting the idea of a centralized government controlled by the "aristocratick" property owners, that their interests be maintained, and that the United States military would be controlled by the elites. He joined the Federalist Party since he believed he could secure a position among the American elite, aligning himself with the supporters of Washington, and like most federalists, he favored centralization, federalism, modernization, and protectionism. He went on to support Republicanism because Wayne ultimately believed that the United States should have a strong centrally-controlled government, stronger banks, manufacturing, and a standing army and navy.

Eventually Wayne presented himself as a candidate for the Pennsylvania Council of Censors and on election day in October 1783, he gathered troops and approached electoral judges, demanding that they would be allowed to vote. On October 10, 1783, he was promoted to major general. Wayne was elected to serve in the Pennsylvania General Assembly for two years.The Council convened to assess Pennsylvania's governmental operations and ascertain if constitutional reforms were deemed imperative.

=== Georgia ===
Wayne, similar to other leaders of the revolutionary period, condoned and participated in owning slaves. He owned enslaved African Americans after the war; he would eventually take over the family farm and tannery business in Chester County. Wayne inherited a 40-year-old male slave named Toby, who was registered in Chester County as a "slave for life." In 1786, he obtained slaves through the confiscated plantations, Richmond and Kew with a total area of 1,134 acres (459 hectares). The 47 slaves were purchased from Adam Tunno, Samuel Potts, and others. He hired a plantation overseer to manage the plantation and direct the actions of his slaves. A record shows 9 boys, 12 girls, 11 women, and 15 men – from Adam Tunno for 3,300 pounds, paying 990 pounds initially and then 2,310 pounds over a five-year period. Wayne also had a personal slave named "Caesar" that he named after his favorite historical figure, Julius Caesar.

The plantations, were confiscated and officially given to Wayne in 1786 along with loans from Dutch bankers for repairs. Wayne quickly fell into debt running the plantations. He is also documented neglecting his business, frequently attending out of state political events, social parties, time with former soldiers, time in Pennsylvania, or traveling. His plantations were ultimately unsuccessful because of neglect and acquiring a large amount of debt. He later begged various acquaintances to assist him with making payments before selling the plantations. His contemporaries criticized him and his overseer for having a "relaxed" hand.

After losing his plantations, Wayne became more political and became a member of the Constitutional Convention. He was a delegate to the state convention that ratified the United States Constitution in 1788 and lost elections to the Senate and the House that same year.

Seeing how Arthur St. Clair served as governor of the Northwest Territory, in 1789, Wayne began a scheme to lead a similar territory he called the "Southern District", saying he would use his position to establish territorial control and combat any existing Native Americans or Spanish. Members of Congress, led by William Maclay, said that the Washington administration manipulated media coverage of hostilities in Georgia, saying it was not as dangerous as newspapers were portraying it to be, resulting with Wayne's plan of controlling a southern territory failing.

=== Congressman ===
Following what historian Paul David Nelson called "a campaign marred by horrendous corruption", Wayne was elected into the 2nd United States Congress as a representative of Georgia's 1st congressional district in late 1790. Beginning his brief political career on March 4, 1791, Wayne remained loyal to George Washington while also facing disputes regarding election fraud. While in Congress, Wayne promoted the increased militarization of the United States and warned against future attacks from the British. He supported an act of 5,000 troops entering to secure ceded land in the Northwest Territory.

Wayne's opponent in the election, James Jackson, formally contested the election on November 14, 1791, saying that Wayne's campaign manager, mayor of Savannah Thomas Gibbons, had committed electoral fraud. House investigations found that Gibbons replaced election magistrates with personal friends, that voting lists were falsified with some results having more votes than eligible voters and that Superior Court judge Henry Osborne approved the results while having knowledge of the irregularities. It was also likely that Wayne had knowledge of the electoral fraud being performed in support of his campaign. On March 13, Wayne sent a letter to Washington, asking for assistance with the investigation. After multiple trial delays, a House committee determined on March 16, 1792, that electoral fraud had been committed in the 1790 election, with Gibbons and Osborne being implicated and not Wayne himself. Wayne officially had his congressional seat vacated on March 21, 1792.

A special election was held on July 9, 1792. Wayne attempted to run again, however was disqualified due to failing residency qualifications. John Milledge eventually filled Wayne's vacant seat.

During his time in Georgia, his wife abandoned him after rumors of a relationship between Wayne and General Nathanael Greene's wife Catherine spread. Wayne was at Greene's side when he died from sunstroke in June 1786, having traveled from his nearby plantation. As a civilian, Wayne ultimately found himself bankrupt, abandoned by his wife, and later removed from office.

== Later military career ==
The Northwest Indian War, which had begun in 1786, had been a disaster for the United States, which had suffered two major defeats: the 1790 Harmar campaign and St. Clair's defeat in 1791. The latter defeat was a particularly crushing blow, with an American force of ~1,000 men suffering a 97% casualty rate. St. Clair's defeat proved to be "the most decisive defeat in the history of the American military" and the United States' largest defeat at the hands of Native Americans. Wayne's close friend Major General Richard Butler died during the battle, and Wayne argued the U.S. military's disorganization and political infighting contributed to the American defeat. The defeat led to a public outcry in the United States, and the Washington administration undertook several steps to reorganize the U.S. military.

Interested in helping the U.S. military rebuild, Wayne had written to President Washington in the spring of 1789 asking to "organize & discipline a Legionary Corps," writing that "Dignity, wealth, & Power" in the United States could only be achieved by the military. United States Secretary of War Henry Knox agreed with Wayne, writing in July 1789 that "the sword of the Republic only, is adequate to guard a due administration of Justice, and the preservation of the peace," believing that treaties with Native Americans were worthless.

At a time of his life when Wayne experienced a shameful political and personal status, Washington recalled Wayne from civilian life in 1792 to oversee the reorganization of the United States Army into the Legion of the United States. Washington, who was under congressional investigation, felt his best choice was to recruit Wayne to take on this daunting task despite Wayne's recent past. Injured, with swollen legs and recurring malaria, Wayne quickly accepted command of the Legion of the United States. Washington also allotted an extraordinary budget for Wayne to triple the size of the army, administering $1 million, about 83% of the federal budget, to establish control of the Northwest Territory through 1,280 enlisted soldiers.

In May 1793, Wayne wrote to Knox, "Knowing the critical situation of our infant nation and feeling for the honor and reputation of the government which I shall support with my latest breath, you may rest assured that I will not commit the legion unnecessarily." Samuel W. Pennypacker, a former governor of Pennsylvania and president of the Historical Society of Pennsylvania, goes on to elaborate on Wayne's perceived importance of American demonstrations of strength, "Wayne had reached the conclusion that we should never have a permanent peace until the Indians were taught to respect the power of the United States, and until the British were compelled to give up their posts along the shores of the lake." Although the British were reluctant to go to war with the United States, the historian Reginald Horsman wrote that "The Indian Department at Detroit had done all within its power to bolster northwestern Indian resistance to American expansion. The agents had acted as organizers, advisers, and suppliers of the Indians, and they had made it possible for an Indian army to face Wayne."

=== Command of the Legion of the United States ===
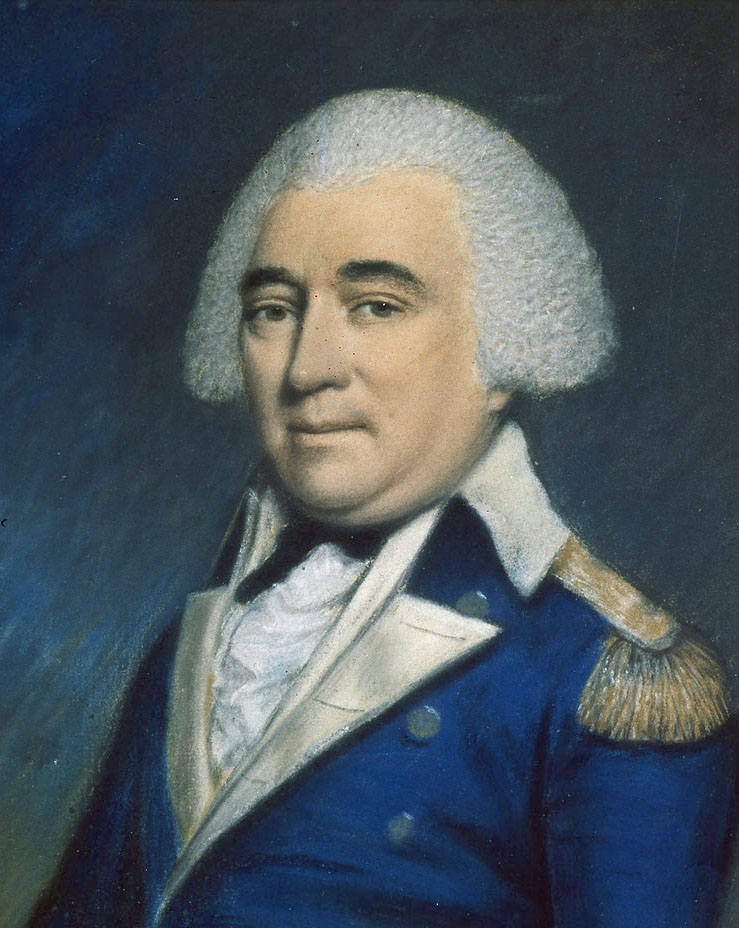
Portrait of Wayne, circa 1795

Upon accepting his new position, Wayne said, "I clearly foresee that it is a command which must inevitably be attended with the most anxious care, fatigue, and difficulty, and from which more may be expected than will be in my power to perform." As the new commanding officer for the Legion of the United States, Wayne was first tasked with increasing the number of soldiers in his force. He expanded Fort Hamilton while he began recruiting in the spring of 1792 in Pittsburgh, Pennsylvania. Although recruiting proved to be a difficult effort with the failures of past American expeditions still fresh, Wayne eventually was able to successfully boost the number of soldiers in the Legion. He helped create several infantry regiments that still exist today, one of them being the Third United States Infantry, called 1st Sub-Legion at the time and later named Third Regiment of Infantry.

Wayne then established Fort Lafayette on September 4, 1792, as a frontier settlement from Fort Pitt. Based on earlier failures of American generals, it was vital to train new soldiers and prepare them for new conflicts. Wayne established a basic training facility at Legionville to prepare professional soldiers for the reorganized army, stating that the area near Pittsburgh was "a frontier Gomorrah" that distracted troops. Using the Regulations for the Order and Discipline of the Troops of the United States authored by Prussian military officer Friedrich Wilhelm von Steuben, Wayne began to train his troops. This was the first attempt to provide basic training for regular Army recruits, and Legionville was the first facility established expressly for this purpose. Wayne set up a well-organized structure of sub-legions led by brigadier generals, seen as forerunners of today's brigade combat teams. Wayne was a strict disciplinarian and executed several troops for offenses. Two soldiers were executed for sleeping at their posts. He required his soldiers to adhere to a sharp dress code, with each sub-legion having a distinctive cap and regimental standards with their unit colors. On April 7, 1793, Wayne's troops moved to Fort Washington in Ohio and continued their intense training while also entrenching themselves to repel potential attacks.

Although some experts today are quick to point to the drawbacks of Wayne's severe disciplinary methods, Major John Brooke finds they also helped build confidence among his troops. Each day, he allowed troops to receive half a gill of whiskey with their rations and an extra one for the best shooters. Barrels of rum, whiskey, wine, flour, and rations were stockpiled at various forts and traveled with Wayne's legion. Brooke goes on to write about Wayne's strong relationship with his soldiers, "The winter passed drearily at Greeneville. They were almost in the heart of the Indian country, cut off from communication with the outside world, and surrounded by crafty and treacherous foes. Wayne shared the hardships and privations of his men, and personally saw that discipline and instruction were kept up. The sentinel on post might know when to expect the conventional visit from the officer of the day, but he never knew at what hour he might see the form of the commander-in-chief emerge from the wintry gloom." Wayne's support of his soldiers builds on his earlier experiences with his soldiers during the Revolutionary War.

During his command of the Legion of the United States, Wayne also encountered domestic problems en route to securing the Northwest Territory. On May 5, 1793, Wayne entered Cincinnati in preparation for future conflict further West. Although Kentucky was a newly independent state after breaking away from Virginia, many citizens still believed that the United States federal government did little to protect their economic interests in the region. Historian Paul David Nelson writes of the local sentiment,"Thus, a few of Kentucky's citizens continued into 1793 to plot all sorts of schemes, including assisting the French to attack Spanish territory, using Kentucky as a base of operations; taking Kentucky out of the federal union and uniting it with the Spanish Empire; and striking a deal with some Canadian citizens to form a separate nation in the West, free from the control of the United States, Britain, or Spain." After learning of a smaller than originally anticipated military force, Wayne had to turn to recruiting local Kentucky citizens with the help of Kentucky Governor, Isaac Shelby. Although Wayne was able to successfully add Kentucky citizens to the Legion, there were still fewer than expected and many joined too late to have a significant impact. Nelson goes on to write about the ineffectiveness of the Kentucky troops during the Northwest Indian War, "Once the Kentucky soldiers reached Wayne's winter head quarters, moreover, they did not cover themselves with glory. The commander, knowing that the troops were restless and murmuring about returning to their home state, suggested to Scott in late October that the Kentucky Mounted Volunteers be detached for a 'desultory expedition against the Indian Villages at Au Glaize'...To Wayne's utter disgust, one-third of Scott's men — through no fault of Scott — simply decamped for home in mid November without order."

On December 24, 1793, Wayne dispatched a force to Ohio to establish Fort Recovery at the location of St. Clair's defeat as a base of operations. Friendly Native Americans helped Wayne recover a cannon that the attackers had buried nearby, with its redeployment at the fort. The fort became a magnet for military skirmishes in the summer of 1794, with an attack led by Miami chief Little Turtle failing after two days and resulting in Blue Jacket becoming war leader. In response, the British built Fort Miami to block Wayne's advance and to protect Fort Lernoult in Detroit. Wayne's army continued north, building strategically defensive forts ahead of the main force. British Indian Department official Alexander McKee provided strategic battle advice to the Northwestern Confederacy beforehand.

On August 3, 1794, a tree fell on Wayne's tent at Fort Adams in northern Mercer County. He was knocked unconscious, but he recovered sufficiently to resume the march the next day to the newly built Fort Defiance on August 8, 1794. After observing Wayne's activities for two years, Little Turtle declared that Wayne was "the Chief that does not sleep" and advised fellow Indians to answer calls for peace, though Blue Jacket and Indian Department officials were opposed. On August 20, 1794, Wayne mounted an assault on the Indian confederacy at the Battle of Fallen Timbers near modern Maumee, Ohio, which was a decisive victory for the U.S. forces, effectively ending the war. It was later discovered that a company of volunteers from Lower Canada under William Caldwell had dressed as Native Americans and participated in the battle. Following the battle, Wayne used Fort Defiance as a base of operations and under the direction of Washington's policies, destroyed the Native Americans’ villages and food stocks. Like many wars throughout history, the U.S. military essentially used a common war tactic known as scorched earth tactics in the later part of the campaign, destroying fields and homes of Native Americans as winter approached. Reporting on the progress, Wayne would write "their future prospects must naturally be gloomy & unpleasant".

The Native Americans attempted to flee to Fort Miami, though the fort's commander, Major William Campbell closed its doors as he was unwilling to risk a war with the United States. Wayne then used Fort Deposit as a base of operations because of its proximity to Fort Miami and encamped for three days in sight of Fort Miami. Wayne attempted to provoke Campbell by destroying McKee's post as well as Native American crops and villages within sight of Fort Miami before withdrawing. When Campbell inquired as to the meaning of the encampment, Wayne replied that the answer had already been given by the sound of American muskets. The next day, Wayne rode alone to Fort Miami and slowly conducted an inspection of the fort's exterior walls. The fort's garrison debated whether to engage Wayne, but in the absence of orders and with Britain already being at war with France, Campbell declined to fire the first shots. Neither Campbell nor Wayne was willing to be the one to start a second war, and the Legion finally departed for Fort Recovery.

Throughout the campaign, Wayne had advocated for vigilance against potential British attacks and planned for another large battle while the Legion was at full strength. When Wayne arrived at Kekionga unopposed on September 17, 1794, he razed the Miami capital and then selected it as the site for the new Fort Wayne. Wayne wanted a strong fort, capable of withstanding a possible attack by British artillery from Fort Detroit. Fort Wayne was finished by October 17 and was capable of withstanding 24-pound cannon. Although the British did not attack from the Northwest and Native Americans did not re-form into a large army, small Native bands continued to harass the Legion's perimeter, scouts, and supply trains.

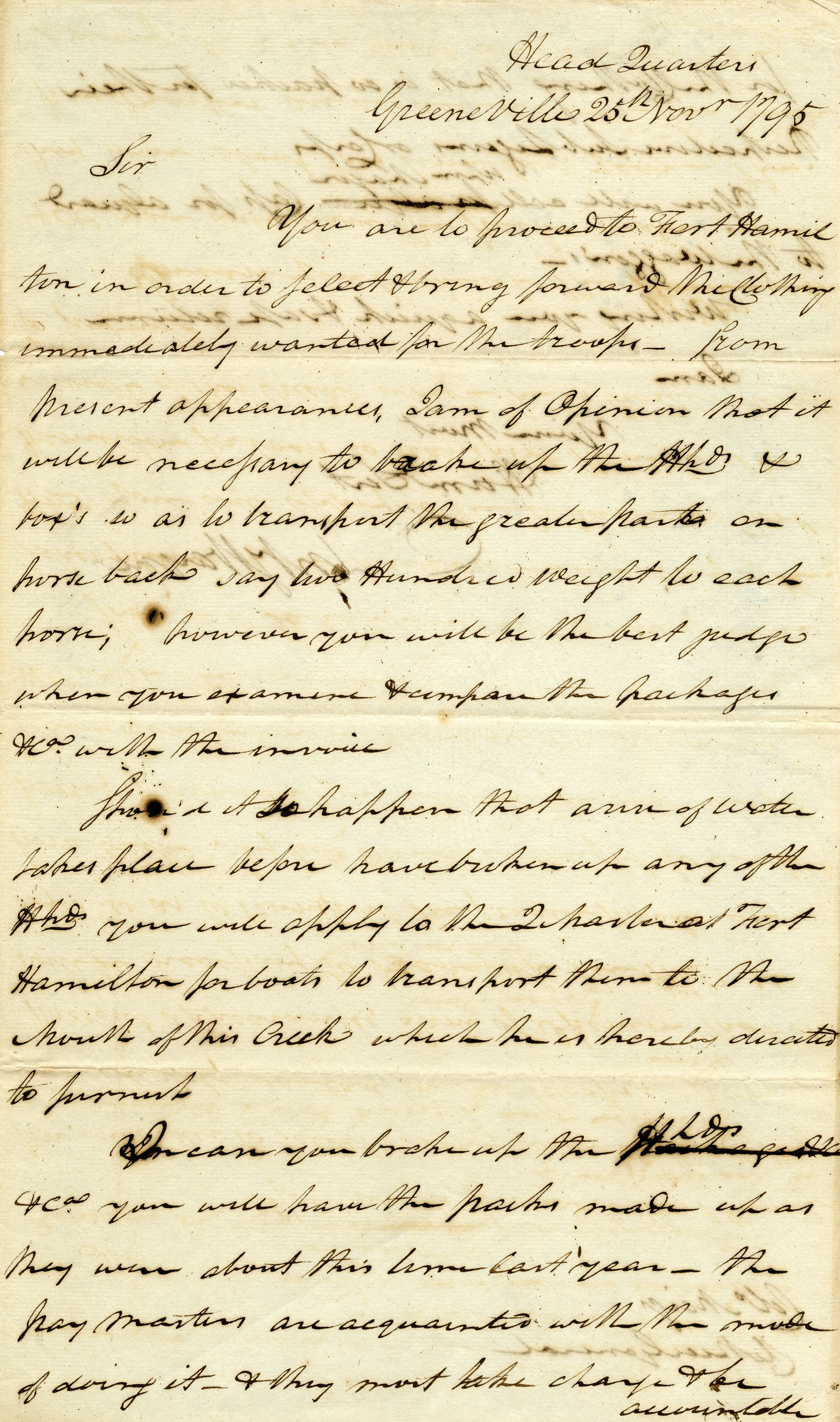
Anthony Wayne letter to Colonel Meigs, November 25, 1795

Wayne then negotiated the Treaty of Greenville between the tribal confederacy — which had experienced a difficult winter – and the United States, which was signed on August 3, 1795. The U.S. stated the land was already ceded by the French or British in previous wars. At the meetings, Wayne promised the land of "Indiana", the remaining land to the west, to remain Indian forever. Wayne also supplied food and farming supplies as a good faith gesture. Wayne read out portions of the Treaty of Paris, stating to the Native Americans that the British were encouraging them to fight for land that they had already ceded to the United States.

While crops were planted and farmed again, Wayne's promise of land and treaty were left vulnerable after his death. A Spanish spy Wilkinson would take command of his army. Citizens eventually continued to settle beyond the borders and the state of Ohio later entered into the Union in 1803. After Wayne's death, settlers continued moving past the borders and pushing the Native American people who lived there further westward.

=== Betrayal by Wilkinson ===
When picking a general to lead the Legion of the United States, President Washington considered a few options, most notably Wayne and James Wilkinson. When thinking of his choices, Washington found Wayne to be, "more active and enterprising than Judicious and cautious," and Wilkinson to be lacking experience, "as he was but a short time in the Service." Throughout the campaign, Wayne's second in command, General Wilkinson secretly tried to undermine him. Wilkinson wrote anonymous negative letters to local newspapers about Wayne and spent years writing negative letters to politicians in Washington, D.C. Wayne was unaware as Wilkinson was recorded as being extremely polite to Wayne in person. Wilkinson was also a Spanish spy at the time and even served as an officer. In December 1794, Wilkinson secretly instructed suppliers to delay rations and send just enough to keep the army alive in hopes of preventing progress. Secretary of War Henry Knox eventually alerted Wayne about Wilkinson, and Wayne began an investigation. Eventually, Spanish couriers carrying payments for Wilkinson were intercepted. Wayne's suspicions were confirmed, and he attempted to court-martial Wilkinson for his treachery. However, Wayne developed a stomach ulcer and died on December 15, 1796; there was no court-martial. Instead Wilkinson began his first tenure as Senior Officer of the Army, which lasted for about a year and a half. He continued to pass on intelligence to the Spanish in return for large sums in gold.

== Death ==
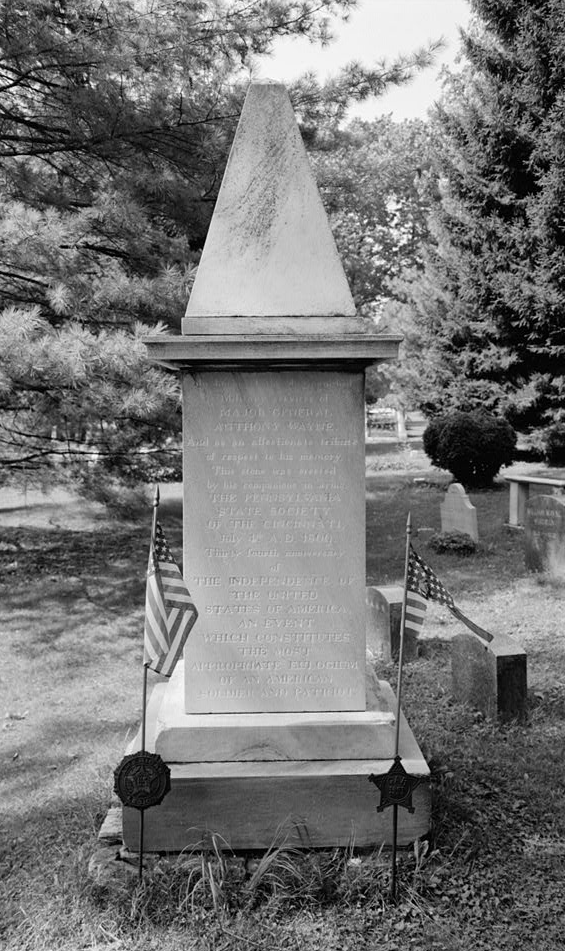
Wayne's grave at St. David's Episcopal Church in Radnor Township, Pennsylvania, which contains Wayne's bones

Wayne died during a return trip to Pennsylvania from a military post in Detroit. It has been speculated, but never proven, that Wilkinson had him assassinated by poison. Wilkinson is documented secretly undermining him throughout his later career, benefited from his death, and would replace him as commander after his death. Shortly after the Northwest Indian War and Wayne's death, his treaty went into abeyance.

Wayne was buried at Fort Presque Isle, where the modern Wayne Blockhouse stands. His son, Isaac Wayne, disinterred the body in 1809 and had the corpse boiled to remove the remaining flesh from the bones. He then placed the bones into two saddlebags and relocated them to the family plot in the graveyard of St. David's Episcopal Church in Wayne, Pennsylvania. The other remains were reburied but were rediscovered in 1878, giving Wayne two known grave sites.

== Legacy ==
=== Military service ===
Wayne's military service legacy is mixed. He is not recognized as a strategist and is primarily seen as a reckless battle tactician. His overhaul of the army and its build up is considered the first attempt by the United States to provide formalized basic training for regular Army troops. His recruits and Legionville were the first facility established expressly for the purpose of a regular army. In Unlikely General, written by historian and author Mary Stockwell, she highlighted his decisive military victories while shedding light on his many personal flaws, being a spendthrift, womanizer, and heavy drinker. He was recognized for his grandiose and luxurious tendencies. Fellow officer Henry Lee III said that Wayne "acquired strength from indulgence". Wayne was considered impulsive, bad-tempered and overly-aggressive as a military leader who advocated the tactics of Julius Caesar and Maurice de Saxe. Nonetheless, later American politicians glorified Wayne. President Theodore Roosevelt later praised Wayne as America's best fighting general. Henry Cabot Lodge mentions with the exception of Washington, and perhaps Greene, that he was the best general the Americans developed in the contest.

=== Participation in ethnic cleansing and slavery ===
Along with other American Founding Fathers, Wayne's reputation has more recently been scrutinized for slavery and his actions against Native American tribes. He was recognized as being racist, with Rob Harper, a historian and professor at University of Wisconsin–Stevens Point, describing Wayne as holding beliefs of "racial and cultural chauvinism". During the Northwest Indian War, some historians have described Wayne's military leadership as contributing to the displacement of Native American populations in the Ohio Valley, sometimes characterizing these actions as ethnic cleansing.

Historian Jeffrey Ostler, writing about how Native Americans perceived the genocide of their people, noted the Native American description of Wayne as a "Black Snake":

[Wayne] had all the cunning of this animal, who ... hides himself in the grass with his head only above it, watching all around to see where the birds are building their nests, that he may know where to find the young ones when they are hatched

Wayne's victory during the Northwest Indian War set a precedent for the treatment of Native Americans by the federal government of the United States. According to Indian Country Today, "It was General Mad Anthony Wayne who led the first wave" of Indian removal in the United States, writing that the Miami people "maintain that celebrating Wayne glosses over and ignores his role in the genocide of Native Americans".

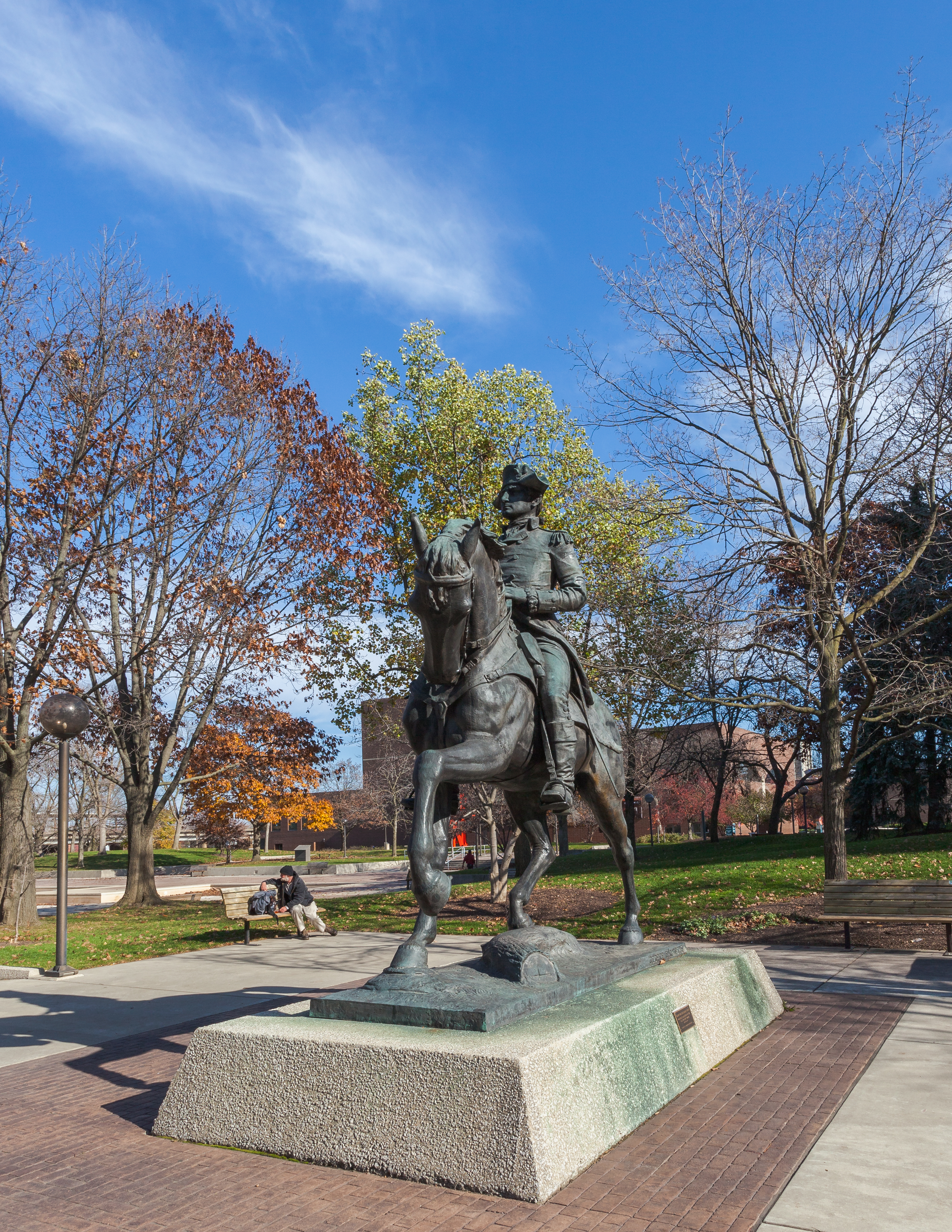
Statue of General Wayne at Freimann Square in Fort Wayne

At a February 2019 city council meeting in Fort Wayne, Indiana, its members voted to approve Anthony Wayne Day, causing controversy due to his participation in ethnic cleansing and slavery. Supporters used text from the Unlikely General by Mary Stockwell to defend Wayne at the time, resulting with Harper criticizing the book saying it was sympathetic towards Wayne and that "the book's blind spots and errors make it a perilous instrument for correcting the historical record."

=== In popular culture ===
Wayne has been covered in numerous books, comics, TV shows and articles. In 2017 Wayne was played by Michael J. Burg in the TV series Turn: Washington's Spies. In 2018, Anthony Wayne was featured on PBS series A Taste of History in episode Remember Paoli! Wayne is one of the main characters in Ann Rinaldi's historical novel, A Ride into Morning. Wayne is a character in Diana Gabaldon's Outlander series. Batman co-creator and writer Bill Finger named Bruce Wayne after him, and later writers established Bruce Wayne as a fictional descendant of Anthony Wayne. Anthony Wayne was depicted in the comic series as Bruce's direct ancestor.

=== Descendants and relatives ===
Wayne's notable relatives and descendants include:

- Isaac Wayne (1772–1852), Wayne's son, a member of the U.S. House of Representatives from Pennsylvania.
- William Wayne (1828–1901), great-grandson, member of the Pennsylvania House of Representatives and member of the Union Army.
- William Wayne (1855–1933), great-great-grandson, member of the Pennsylvania House of Representatives
- Isaac Wayne Van Leer (1846–1861) enlisted for the Union during the Civil War at age 15 and was documented in several publications for his patriotism.
- Blake Ragsdale Van Leer (1893–1956), fifth president of Georgia Tech and leader in desegregation
- Blake Wayne Van Leer (1926–1997), a prominent commander and captain in the U.S. Navy and led Seabee program, the nuclear research and power unit at McMurdo Station during Operation Deep Freeze.
- Jonwayne (1990–present), a Southern California-based rapper and record producer.
- Blake Van Leer III (1982–present), an entrepreneur, film producer and candidate for North Carolina House of Representatives

=== Memorials and honors ===
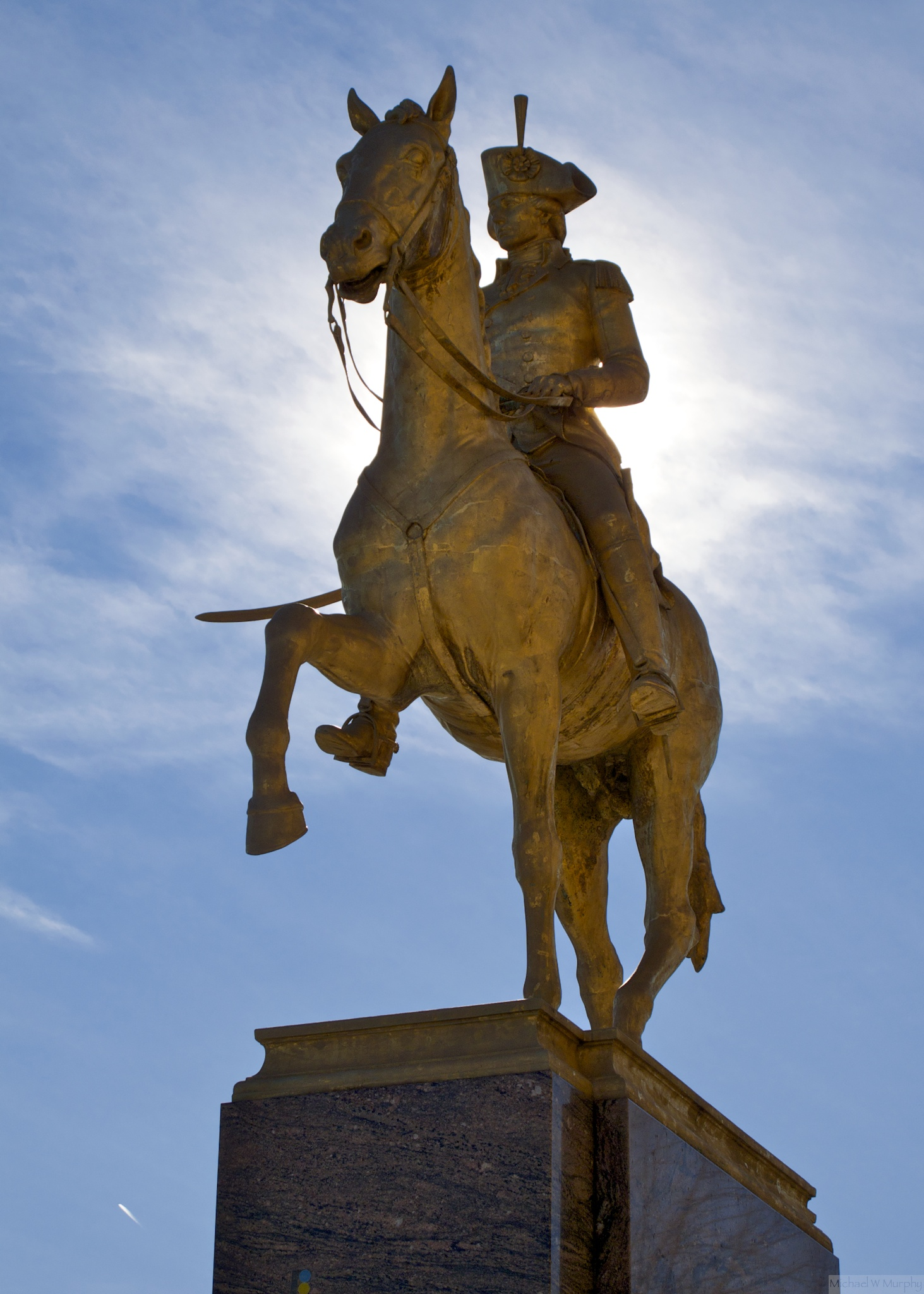
Equestrian statue of Anthony Wayne (1937) by American sculptor John Gregory, located at the Philadelphia Museum of Art.

A lunette above the door in the United States Senate room 128, designed originally to house the Senate Committee on Military Affairs and Militia, features a fresco by Constantino Brumidi named "Storming at Stonypoint, General Wayne wounded in the head carried to the fort". On September 14, 1929, the U.S. Post Office issued a stamp honoring Wayne which commemorated the 135th anniversary of the Battle of Fallen Timbers. The post office issued a series of stamps often referred to as the "Two Cent Reds" by collectors, most of them issued to commemorate the 150th anniversaries of the many events that occurred during the American Revolution. The stamp shows Bruce Saville's Battle of Fallen Timbers Monument.

In February 2019, the city council Fort Wayne, Indiana, approved the creation of Anthony Wayne Day by a vote of 6–3. The approval sparked debate, was criticized by other councilmen, reporters, and the Miami tribe. The Miami tribe, who maintain a strong connection with Fort Wayne as part of their ancestral homeland, objected to many of the facts put forward by supporters to champion Wayne. The Miamis were quoted, "In a show of respect for Fort Wayne's own sovereignty, the tribal council came to a decision: It would object to the resolution's historical errors and omissions, but not to the honoring of Wayne himself."

The Wayne National Forest located in southeast Ohio was named in honor of General Wayne. It was established as a National Forest for the public in December 1992.

Several of Wayne's uniforms, ranks, tactics and military legions exist today in the US Army. His legions were renamed regiments. One of them is now known as the Third Regiment of Infantry which is best known for its role in the changing-of-the-guard ceremony at the Tomb of the Unknown Soldier at the Arlington National Cemetery.

=== Locations named after Anthony Wayne ===
Type	Name	State	2020 Population	Ref
Fort	Fort Wayne	Indiana	NA	
Fort	Fort Wayne	Michigan	NA	
Fort	Fort Wayne	Oklahoma	NA	
Town	Waynesburg	Pennsylvania	4,001	
City	Fort Wayne	Indiana	263,886	
Village	Wayne	Illinois	2,286	
Village	Wayne	Ohio	841	
City	Wayne	Michigan	17,713	
City	Wayne	Nebraska	5,973	
Town	Wayne	New York	1,006	
Unincorporated community	Wayne	Pennsylvania	NA	
Town	Wayne	West Virginia	1,441	
Borough	Waynesboro	Pennsylvania	10,951	
Independent city	Waynesboro	Virginia	22,196	
Town	Waynesville	North Carolina	10,140	
County	Wayne	Georgia	30,144	
County	Wayne	Illinois	16,179	
County	Wayne	Indiana	66,553	
County	Wayne	Iowa	6,497	
County	Wayne	Kentucky	19,555	
County	Wayne	Michigan	1,793,561	
County	Wayne	Mississippi	19,779	
County	Wayne	Missouri	10,974	
County	Wayne	Nebraska	9,697	
County	Wayne	New York	91,283	
County	Wayne	North Carolina	117,333	
County	Wayne	Ohio	116,894	
County	Wayne	Pennsylvania	51,155	
County	Wayne	Tennessee	16,232	
County	Wayne	West Virginia	38,982	

There are also many townships named after Anthony Wayne, including 21 in Ohio alone.

== Gallery ==
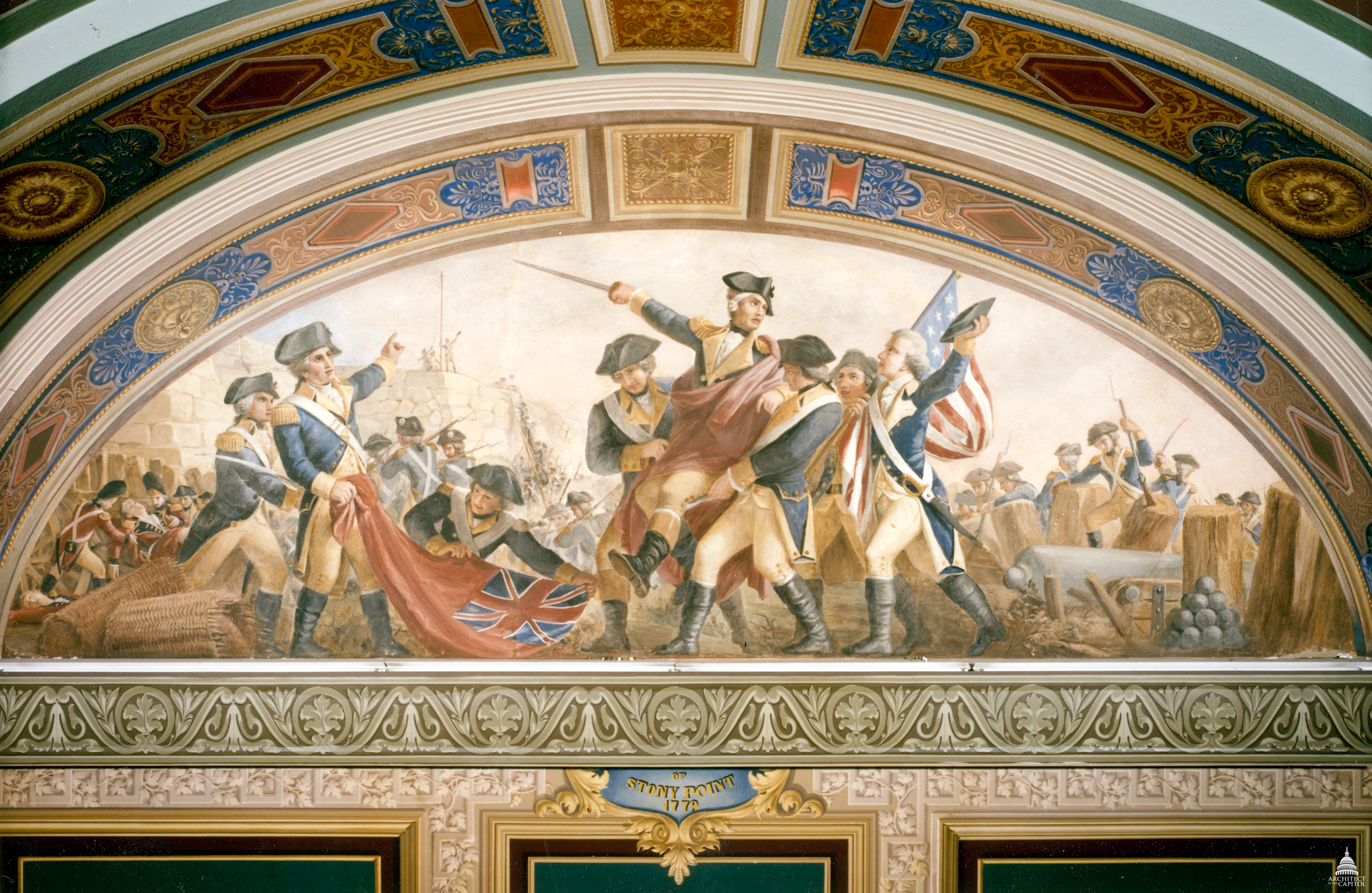
The Storming of Stony Point, 1779 by Constantino Brumidi (1871) in room S-128 of the United States Capitol

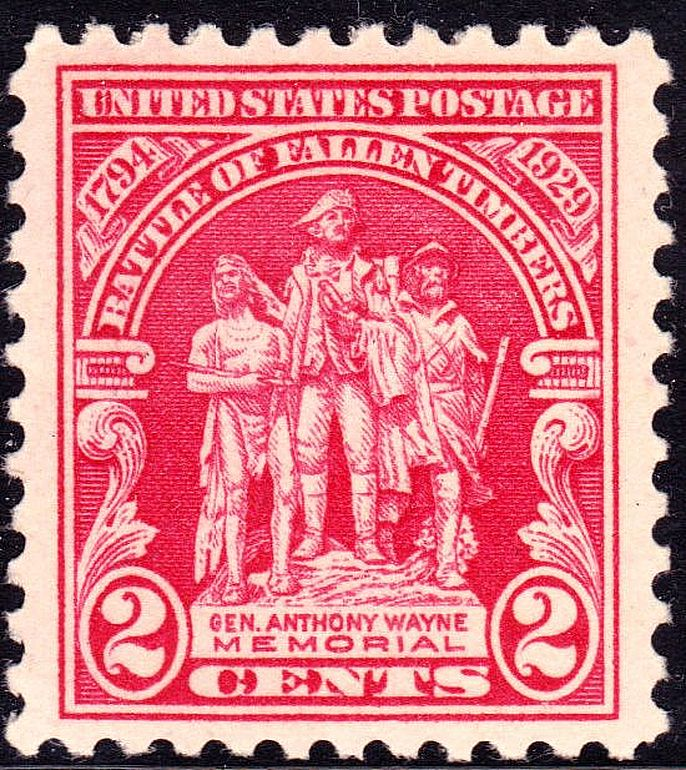
Battle of Fallen Timbers, commemorative issue of 1928, 2¢

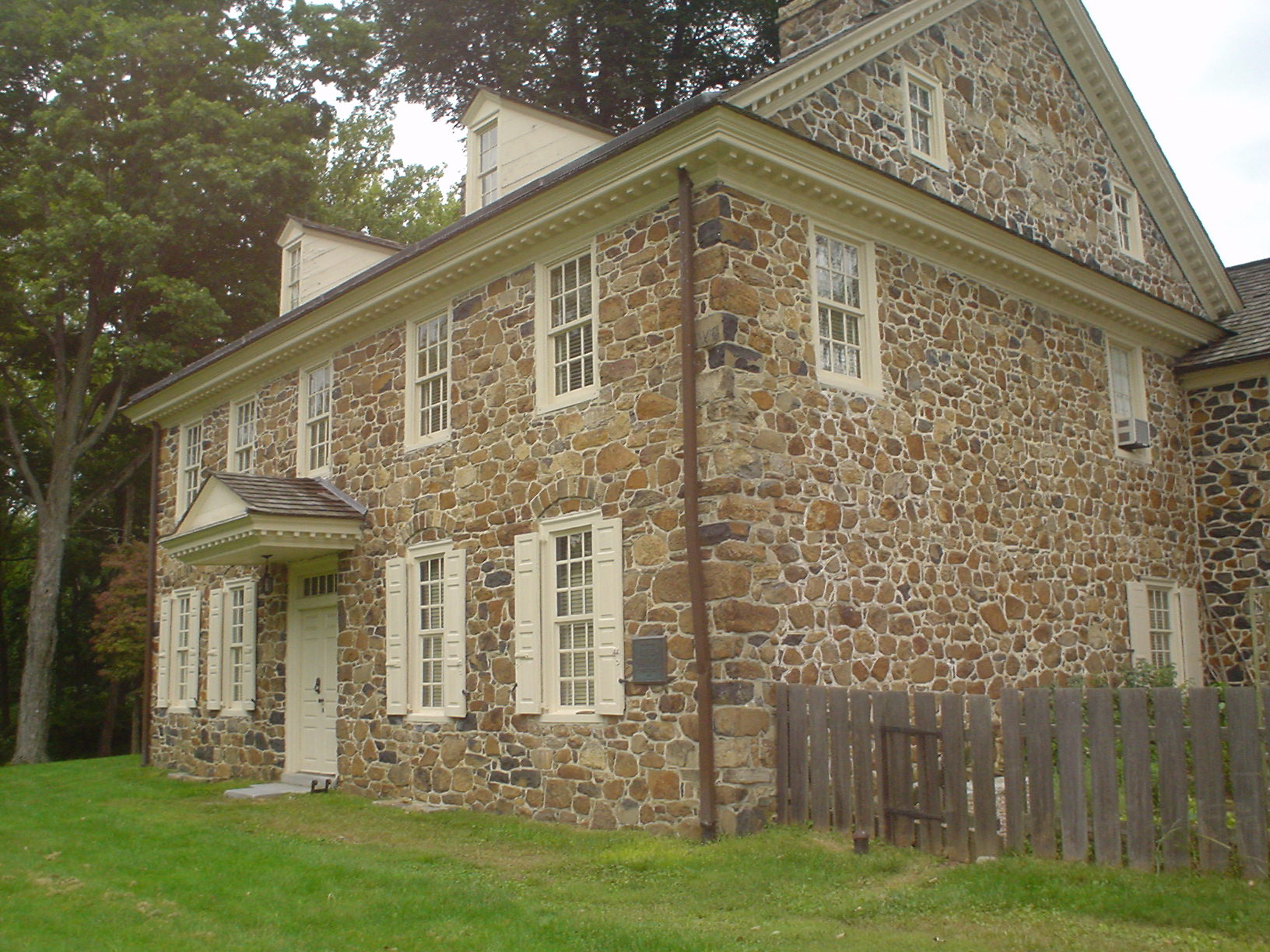
His home, Waynesborough in Paoli, Pennsylvania

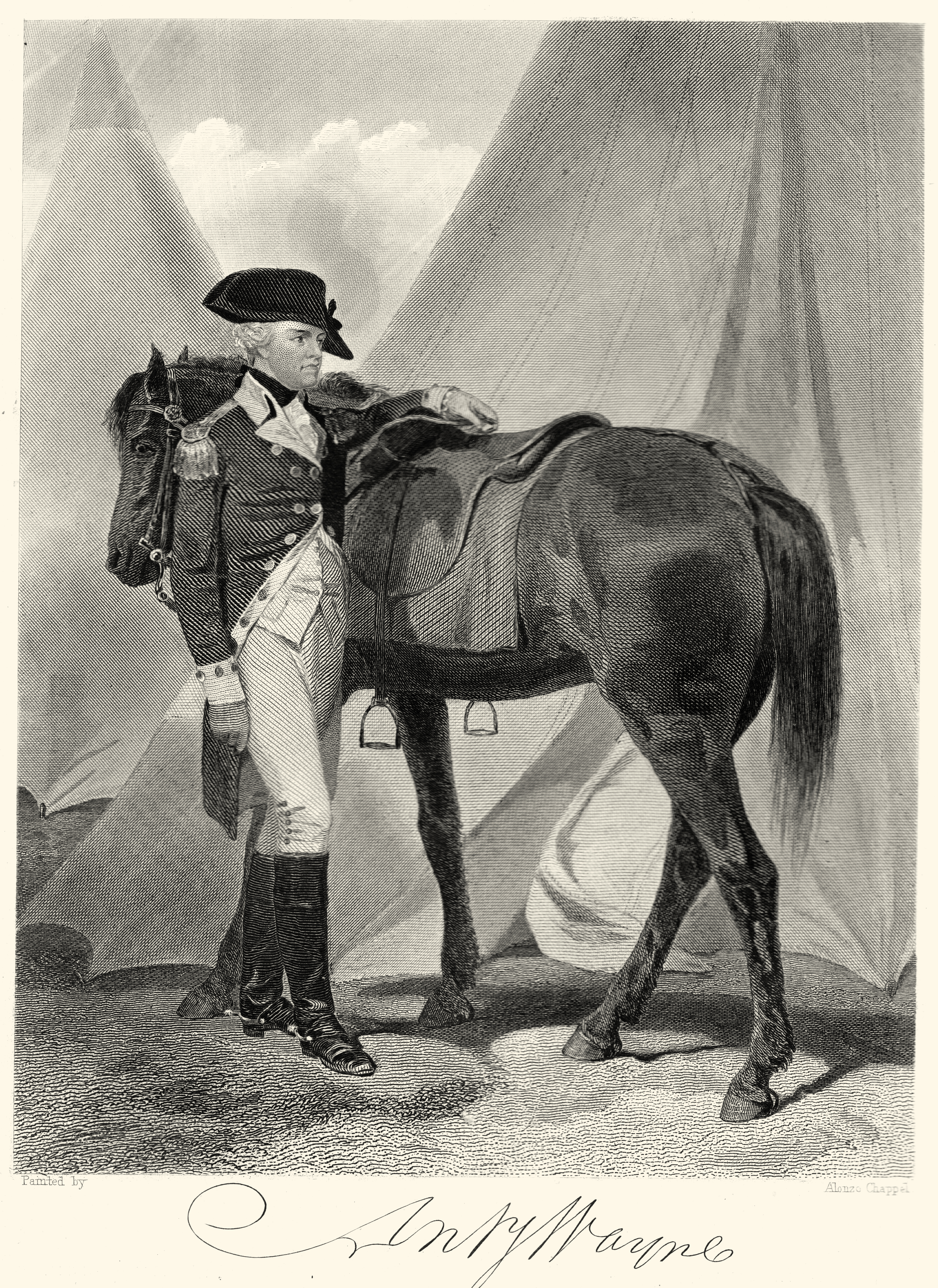
Steel engraving of Anthony Wayne by Alonza Chappel

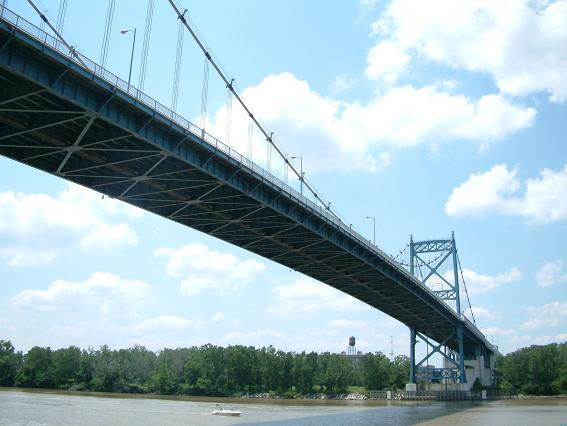
Anthony Wayne Bridge (Toledo, Ohio)

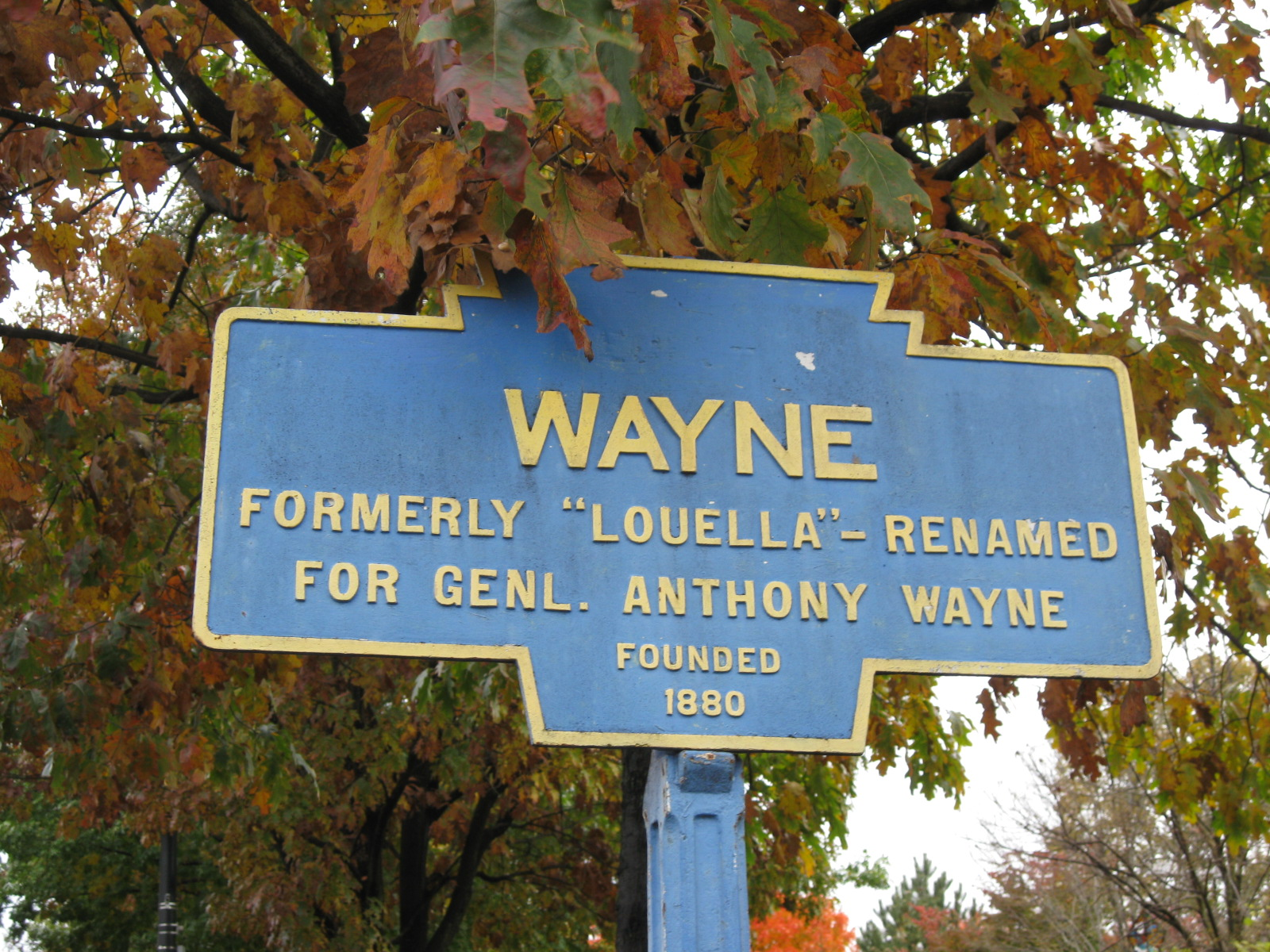
Keystone Marker in Wayne, Pennsylvania, named for General Wayne

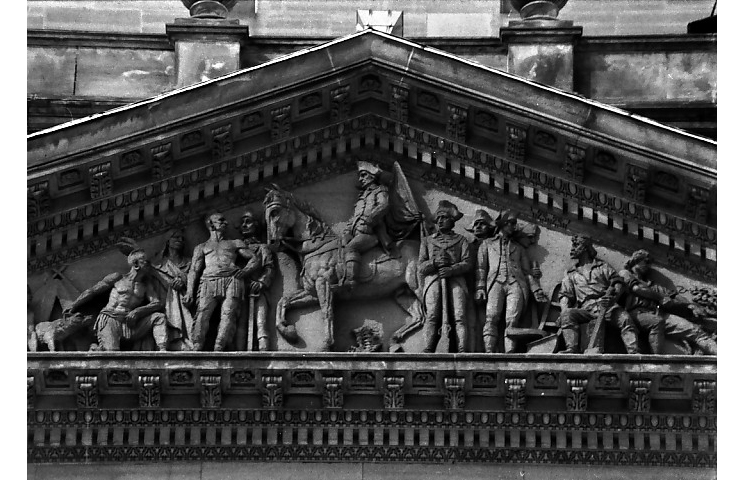
Wayne County Building (Detroit, Michigan) pediment

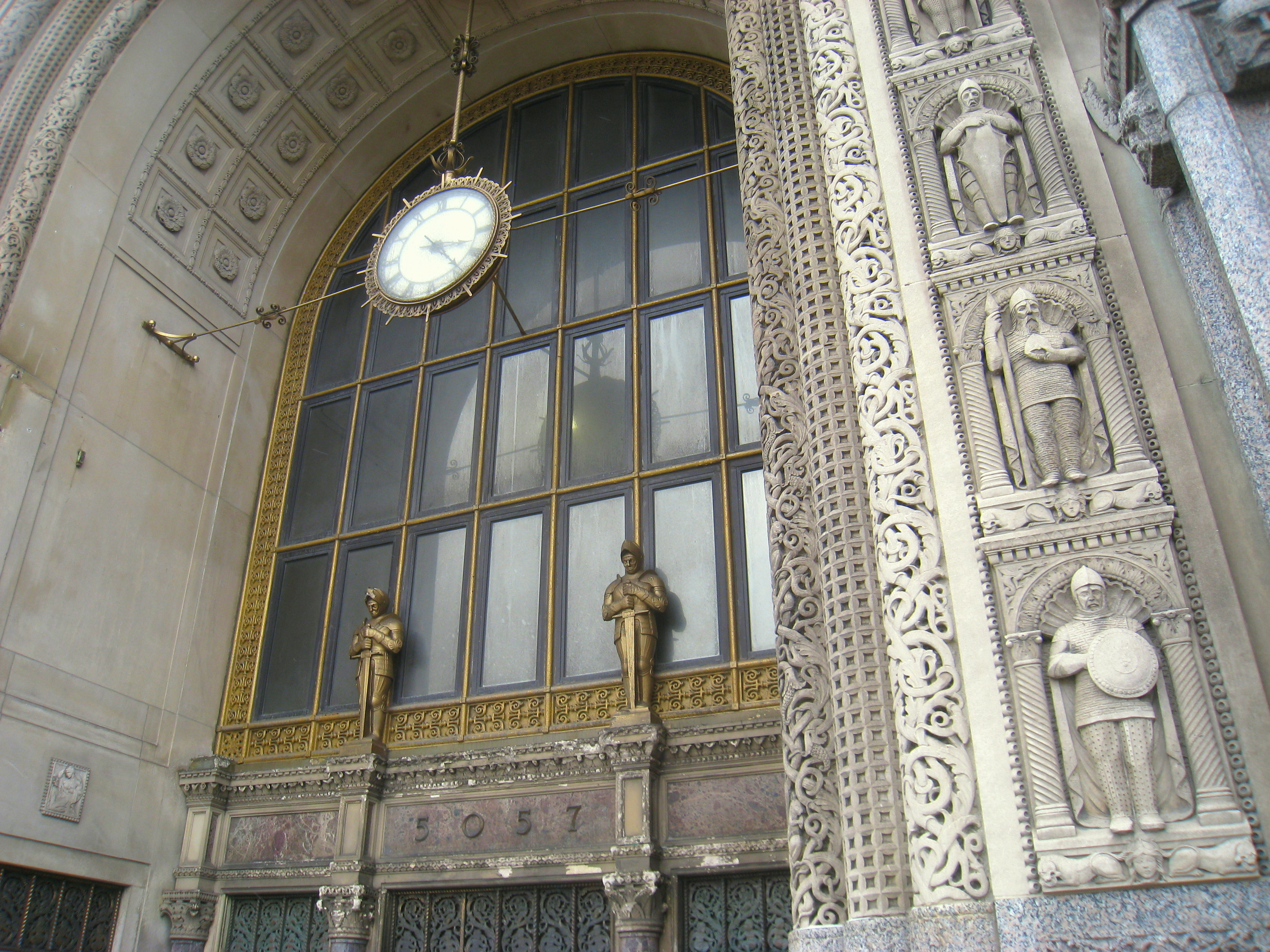
Wayne State University. Detroit, Michigan, Maccabees Building

U.S. House of Representatives
Preceded by James Jackson	Member of the U.S. House of Representatives from Georgia's 1st congressional district March 4, 1791 – March 21, 1792	Succeeded by John Milledge
Military offices
Preceded by Arthur St. Clair	Senior Officer of the United States Army; 1792–1796	Succeeded by James Wilkinson
