= USS Fort Wayne =

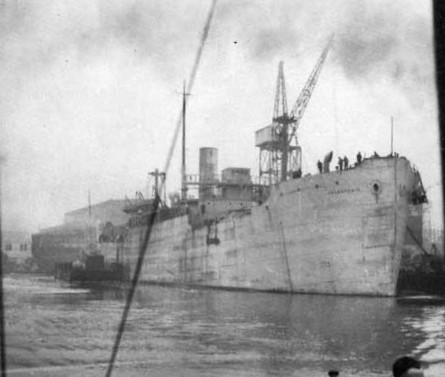
- Another Type 1016 cargo ship, SS Osawatomie

History

United States
- Name: Fort Wayne
- Namesake: Fort Wayne
- Builder: Baltimore Drydock and Shipbuilding Co., Baltimore, Maryland
- Launched: 28 September 1918
- Completed: 1918
- Acquired: 27 December 1918
- Commissioned: 27 December 1918
- Decommissioned: 23 April 1919 at Norfolk, Virginia
- Maiden voyage: Baltimore, Maryland, to Gibraltar
- Stricken: circa 23 April 1919
- Fate: Returned to the U.S. Shipping Board and scrapped in Japan in 1934

General characteristics
- Type: Freighter
- Tonnage: 6,245 GRT
- Displacement: 12,260 tons
- Length: 423 ft 9 in (129.16 m)
- Beam: 64 ft (20 m)
- Draft: 24 ft 2 in (7.37 m)
- Speed: 10 knots
- Complement: 60 officers and enlisted
- Notes: After Navy service, she became the SS Fort Wayne

USS Fort Wayne (ID 3786) was a Design 1016 freighter acquired by the U.S. Navy during the last year of World War I. She was assigned to carry cargo to Europe, after which she was decommissioned and sold by the U.S. Shipping Board. She then became the SS Fort Wayne, and was scrapped in Japan in 1934.

== Constructed in Baltimore ==
Fort Wayne (No. 3786), a 6245 gross register ton (12,260 tons displacement) freighter, was built in 1918 by Baltimore Drydock and Shipbuilding Co., Baltimore, Maryland; acquired by the Navy 27 December 1918; and commissioned as USS Fort Wayne (ID-3786) the same day.

== World War I support ==
The ship loaded general cargo and sailed from Baltimore 26 January 1919 for Gibraltar, with a refueling stop at the Azores. At Gibraltar Fort Wayne received orders to deliver a full load of cargo for the Italian government at La Spezzia, Italy, where she arrived in mid-February. Because of a shortage of cargo handling workers she was delayed there for almost a month and finally sailed for Norfolk, Virginia, arriving there on 20 April.

After refueling at the Azores the freighter had to return there in early April for repairs to her propeller.

== Final decommissioning and subsequent history ==
USS Fort Wayne was decommissioned at Norfolk, Virginia, 23 April 1919 and returned to the U.S. Shipping Board. SS Fort Wayne was sold by the Shipping Board to a commercial firm in 1929 and was scrapped in Japan in 1934.
