= Wain (surname) =

Wain is a surname. Notable people with the surname include:

- Bea Wain (1917–2017), American Big Band-era singer
- David Wain (born 1969), American comedian, writer, actor and director
- Edward Wain, a.k.a. Robert Towne (born 1934), American screenwriter and director
- John Wain (1925–1994), English poet, novelist, and critic, associated with the literary group "The Movement"
- Louis Wain (1860–1939), English artist known for his drawings featuring anthropomorphised large-eyed cats and kittens
- Louise Wain, English respiratory researcher
- Richard William Leslie Wain (1896–1917), Welsh recipient of the Victoria Cross
- William Wain Prior (1876–1946), Commander-in-Chief of the Royal Danish Army, 1939–1941

== See also ==
- Charles' Wain
- Burmeister & Wain
- Waine Pryce
