= WAYN =

WAYN may refer to:

- WAYN (AM), a radio station (900 AM) licensed to Rockingham, North Carolina, United States
- WAYN (website), a social networking website whose name is an acronym for "Where Are You Now?"
