= Waynesborough =

Historic house in Pennsylvania, United States

- U.S. National Register of Historic Places
- U.S. National Historic Landmark
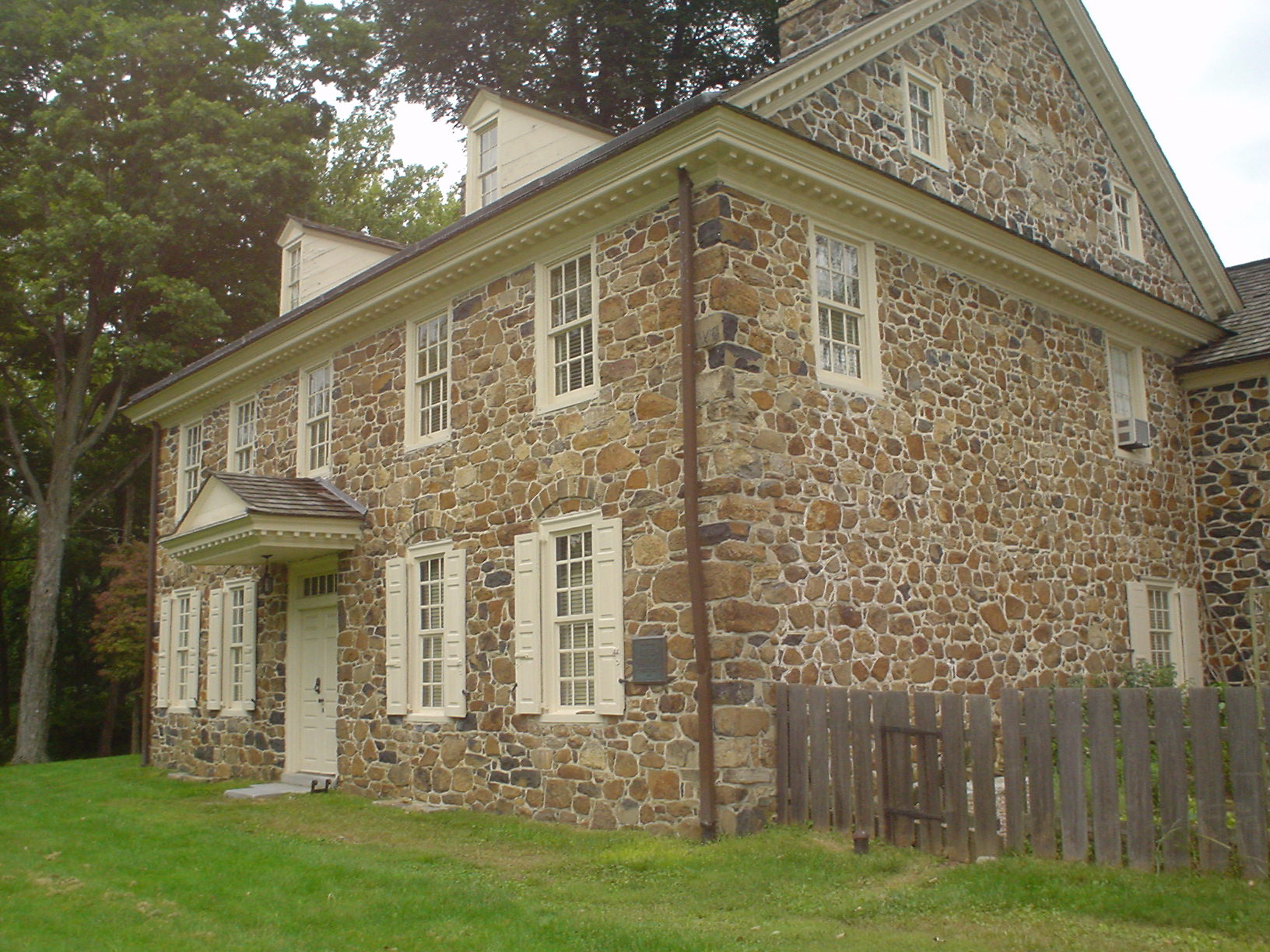

- Location within Pennsylvania Location within the United States
- Location: 2049 Waynesborough Road, Paoli, Pennsylvania
- Coordinates: 40°01′55″N 75°28′26″W
- Area: 14 acres (5.7 ha)
- Built: 1724
- Architect: W. M. Wayne
- Architectural style: Georgian
- NRHP reference No.: 73001603

Significant dates
- Added to NRHP: March 7, 1973
- Designated NHL: November 28, 1972

Waynesborough, also known as the Gen. Anthony Wayne House, is a historic house museum at 2049 Waynesborough Road in Easttown Township, Chester County, Pennsylvania. Built in 1724 and repeatedly enlarged, it was for many years the home of American Revolutionary War general and Founding Father Anthony Wayne (1745–1796). A National Historic Landmark, it is now a museum operated by the Philadelphia Society for the Preservation of Landmarks, offering tours and event rentals.

== Description and history ==
Waynesborough is located about 1 mile (1.6 km) south of the center of Paoli, on the north side of Waynesborough Road. It is a roughly U-shaped stone structure, the main block 2 1/2 stories in height and covered by a gabled roof. It is five bays wide, with a center entrance sheltered by a gabled hood. The roof has two gabled dormers to the front and three to the rear, with two interior stone chimneys. Lower two-story wings extend toward the rear on the right side and to the left on the left side. The left (west) wing is the oldest portion of the house.

The oldest portion of the house was built by Wayne's grandfather, Captain W. M. Wayne, in 1724. Captain Wayne's son enlarged the house in 1765 and a wing was added in 1812. It was at Waynesborough that Anthony Wayne was born in 1745, and it was his home for all but the last five years of his life. Wayne continued his father's farm and tannery, and became involved in the Patriot cause early in the American Revolution. He distinguished himself as a military leader in the American Revolutionary War for his brash and sometimes risky maneuvers, winning him the moniker "Mad" Anthony. He died in what is now Erie, Pennsylvania, while leading troops in the aftermath of the Northwest Indian War.

The Waynesborough property remained in the hands of Wayne's direct descendants until 1965, and was in 1980 transferred to a local preservation group. The Philadelphia Society for the Preservation of Landmarks now manages the property, and offers tours from mid-March through December on Thursday through Sunday.

== Gallery ==
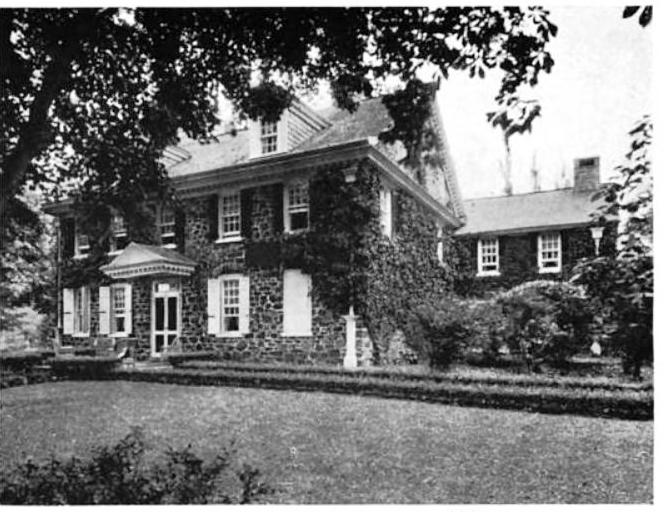
Waynesborough, front view, circa 1919

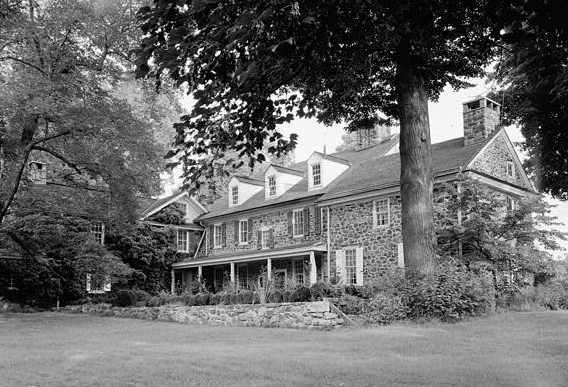
Waynesborough, rear view in 1960

== See also ==
- List of National Historic Landmarks in Pennsylvania
- National Register of Historic Places listings in eastern Chester County, Pennsylvania
