= Haluska =

Haluska is a surname. Notable people with the surname include:

- Adam Haluska (born 1983), American basketball player
- Edward Haluska (1916–2002), American politician
- Gary Haluska (born 1950), American politician
- Jim Haluska (1932–2012), American football player

== See also ==
- Galushka
