= George E. Prindible =

American industrialist and Papal Knight

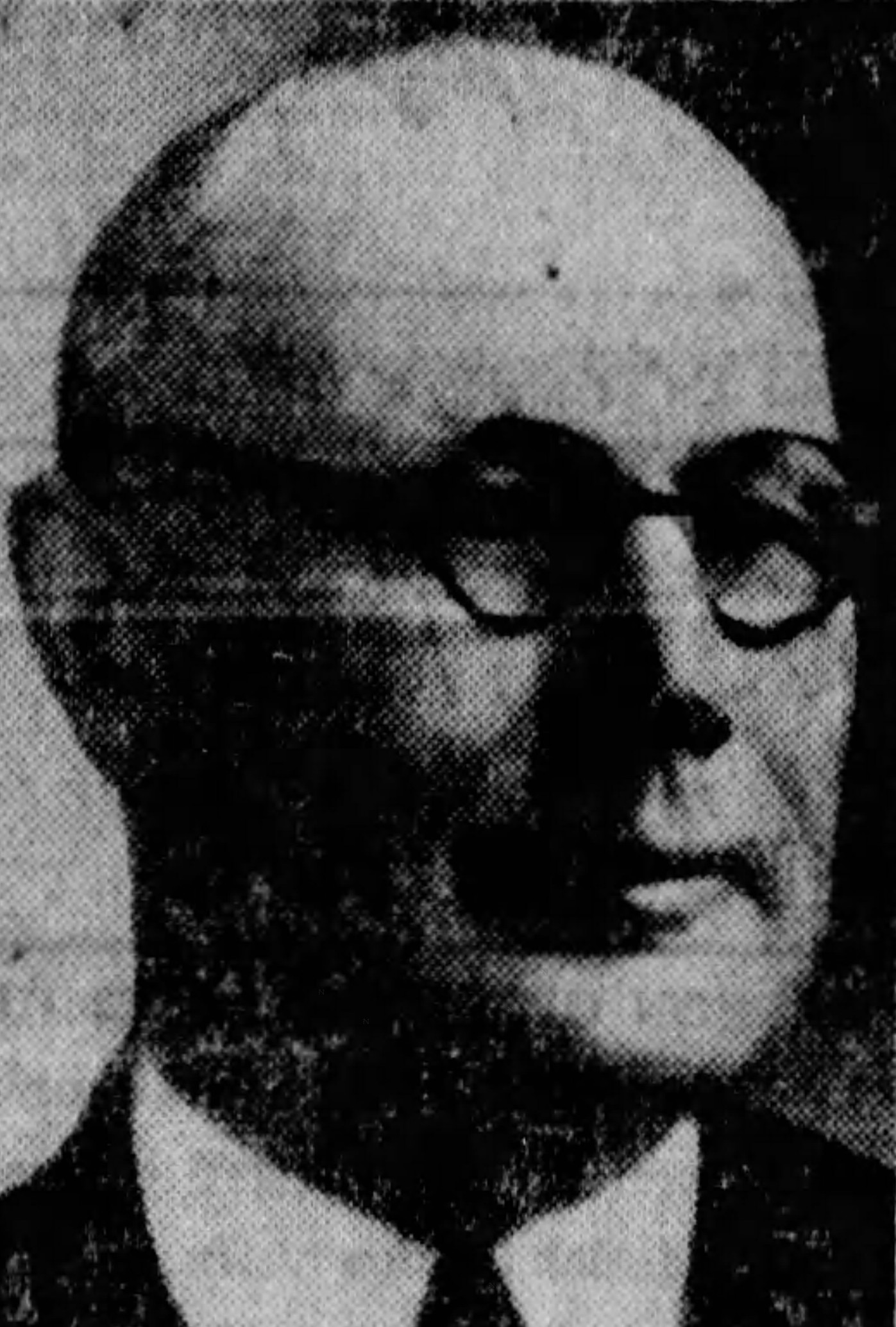
- Prindible in 1937
- Born: George Engle Prindible; January 13, 1873; Lock Haven, Pennsylvania, U.S.
- Died: March 7, 1964 (aged 91); St. Petersburg, Florida, U.S.
- Education: Saint Francis University
- Occupations: Banker, industrialist, philanthropist
- Title: General Manager of Patton Clay Manufacturing Company; President of First National Bank of Patton
- Spouse: Louise Quina Prindible (m. 1927; died 1964)

Signature
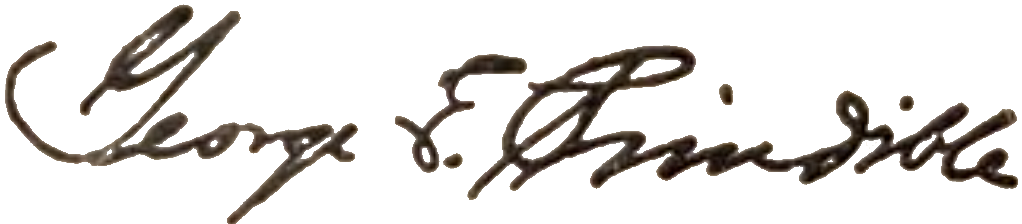

George Engle Prindible (January 13, 1873 – March 7, 1964) was an American industrialist, banker and Papal Knight of the Order of St. Gregory the Great.

== Early life and education ==
George Engle Prindible was born on January 13, 1873, in Lock Haven, Pennsylvania, as the middle child among eight. He was the son of Julia (née Connell) and Patrick Prindible. He excelled academically, graduating as salutatorian at Lock Haven High School in May, 1890. He attended Saint Francis University and later served on both the Alumni Board and the Board of Governors.

== Career ==
=== Industry ===
In 1894, at the age of 21, George Prindible was the manager/foreman of the stone quarry of railroad contractor George S. Good south of Patton, Pennsylvania.

In 1894, Prindible worked with the railroad crews of George S. Good on the Choctaw, Oklahoma and Gulf Railroad as the Quartermaster.

During World War I, Prindible served on the War Service Committee representing the clay sewer pipe industry formed by President Woodrow Wilson.

=== Banking ===
Prindible played a role in the central Pennsylvania banking industry, holding positions in multiple financial institutions. By 1906, he was serving as a director of the First National Bank of Patton. That same year, he became a founding shareholder of the newly established Grange National Bank of Patton.

By 1930, Prindible had risen in the banking sector, serving as President of the Cambria County Bankers’ Protective Association. He also held the position of President at multiple financial institutions, including The Ebensburg Trust Company, The Keystone Bank of Spangler, and The First National Bank of Patton.

=== St. Francis University ===
Prindible was first Treasurer of the St. Francis Alumni Board in 1927 and served on the Alumni Board and St. Francis Board of Governors. Along with Charles M. Schwab and Rembrandt Peale, Sr, Prindible was responsible for the $200,000 endowment effort for the university in 1928. He made many uncredited donations to the university and each year, until at least 1939, the "Prindible Medal" was awarded to the outstanding member of the Senior Class.

In 1927, Prindible was honored with a Doctor of Laws (LL.D.) degree from Saint Francis University in recognition of his contributions to the University, community and nation. Prindible's sister Loretto Prindible was the first women awarded a Doctor of Laws (LL.D.) from the university in 1933.

== Personal life ==
On July 8, 1927, Prindible married Louise Quina Blount, widow of W. A. Blount, of Pensacola, Florida. While having no children of his own, he had 2 stepdaughters in Cora Louise and Marion through his marriage to Louise. Prindible outlived all of his siblings and wife, dying at the age of 91.

According to The Altoona Mirror, Prindible "Furnished much of the lumber, hollow tiles, pipes and other materials" used in the construction of Bryn Athyn Cathedral. which has been cited by Arthur Kingsley Porter as "alone of modern buildings ... worthy of comparison with the best of the middle ages." Rivaling the Washington, D.C., National Cathedral and New York's St. John the Divine (also by Cram), it attests to the continuing hold of Gothic on the popular imagination.

Prindible was declared a Sir Knight of the Order of St. Gregory the Great by the Rt. Rev. John Joseph McCort, D. D., Bishop of Altoona Diocese on July 15, 1929 in St. Mary's Catholic Church of Patton, Pennsylvania.
