= Pennsylvania House of Representatives, District 74 =

American legislative district

Pennsylvania's 74th State House of Representatives district
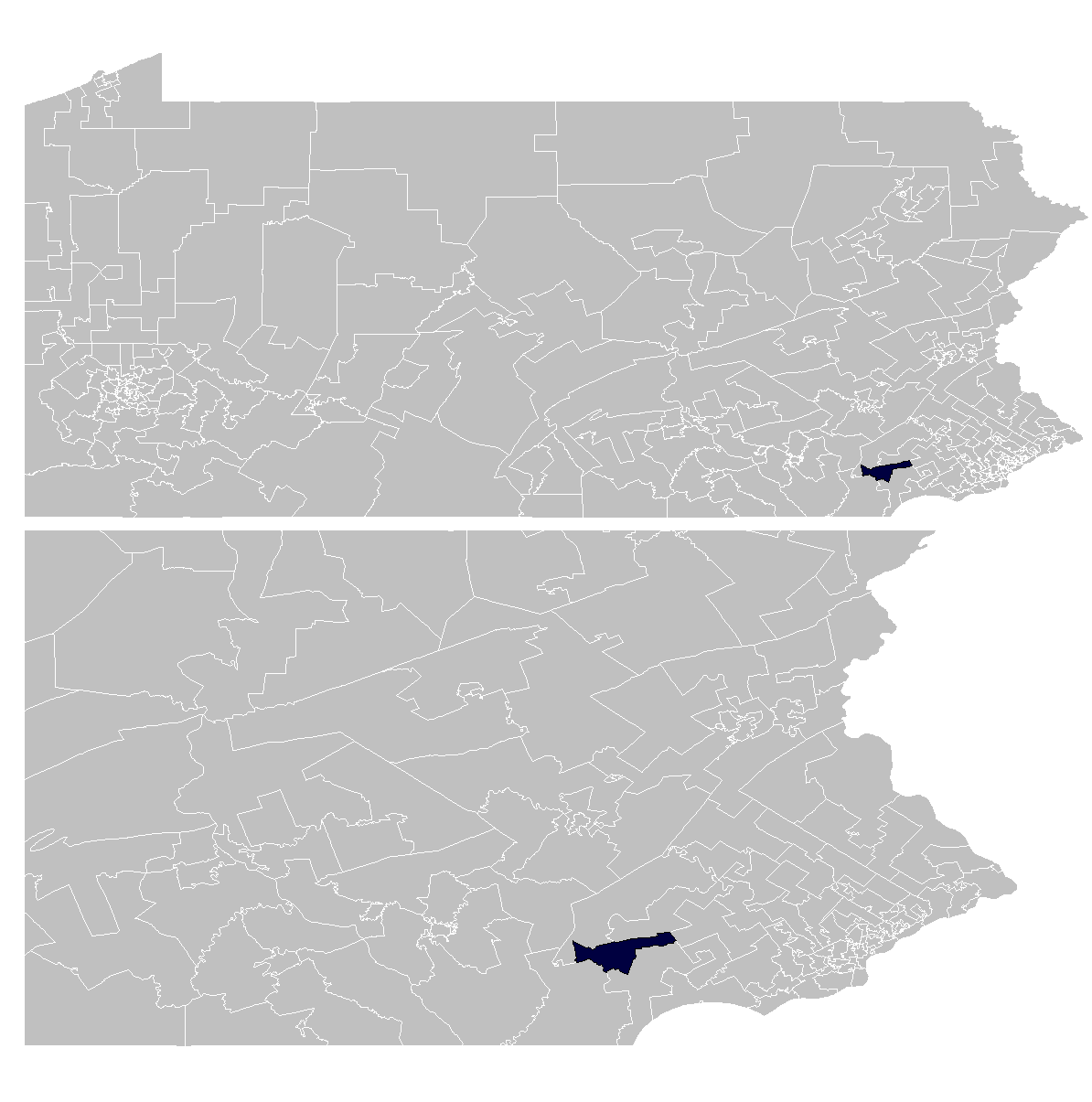
Representative
Dan K. Williams; D–Sadsbury Township, Chester County
- Population (2022): 64,829

The 74th Pennsylvania House of Representatives District is located in southeast Pennsylvania and has been represented by Dan K. Williams since 2019.

== District profile ==
The 74th District is located in Chester County and includes the following areas:

- Atglen
- Caln Township (part)
  - District 01
  - District 02
  - District 03
- Coatesville
- Honey Brook
- Honey Brook Township
- Modena
- Parkesburg
- Sadsbury Township
- South Coatesville
- Valley Township
- West Caln Township
- West Sadsbury Township

== Representatives ==
Representative	Party	Years	District home	Note
Prior to 1969, seats were apportioned by county.
Austin M. Harrier	Republican	1969 – 1974		
Camille George	Democrat	1975 – 2013	Houtzdale	Did not seek re-election
Tommy Sankey	Republican	2013 – 2014		Subsequently, represented the 73rd district
District moved from Clearfield County to Chester County after 2014
Harry Lewis	Republican	2015 – 2018	Caln Township	Retired
Dan K. Williams	Democrat	2019 – present	Sadsbury Township	Incumbent

== Recent election results ==
Pennsylvania House of Representatives, District 74, 2018
Party	Candidate	Votes	%
Democratic	Dan Williams	14,826	61.47
Republican	Amber Little-Turner	9,294	38.53
Write-in		17	0.07
Total votes		24,120	100.00
Democratic gain from Republican			

Pennsylvania House of Representatives, District 74, 2020
Party	Candidate	Votes	%
Democratic	Dan Williams (incumbent)	21,547	64.30
Republican	Dale Hensel	11,912	35.55
Write-in		50	0.15
Total votes		33,509	100.00
Democratic hold			

Pennsylvania House of Representatives, District 74, 2022
Party	Candidate	Votes	%
Democratic	Dan Williams (incumbent)	13,289	55.90
Republican	Dale Hensel	10,346	43.52
Write-in		39	0.16
Total votes		23,774	100.00
Democratic hold			
