= Paul Yahner =

American politician

Paul J. Yahner

Member of the Pennsylvania House of Representatives from the 73rd district
- In office 1969–1980
- Preceded by: District created
- Succeeded by: Edward Haluska

Member of the Pennsylvania House of Representatives from the Cambria County district
- In office 1965–1968

Personal details
- Born: November 8, 1908 Patton, Pennsylvania, U.S.
- Died: August 6, 1993 (aged 84) Patton, Pennsylvania, U.S.
- Party: Democratic
- Spouse: Rosemarie
- Children: 13

Paul J. Yahner (November 8, 1908 – August 6, 1993) was an American politician who served as a Democratic member of the Pennsylvania House of Representatives from 1965 to 1968.
