= Pennsylvania House of Representatives, District 73 =

American legislative district

Pennsylvania's 73rd State House of Representatives district
Representative
Dallas Kephart; R–Decatur Township, Clearfield County
- Population (2022): 61,454

The 73rd Pennsylvania House of Representatives District is located in central Pennsylvania and has been represented by Dallas Kephart since 2023.

== District profile ==
The 73rd District is located in Cambria County and Clearfield County and includes the following areas:

Cambria County

- Barr Township
- Carrolltown
- East Carroll
- Elder Township
- Hastings
- Northern Cambria
- Patton
- Susquehanna Township
- West Carroll Township

Clearfield County

- Beccaria Township
- Bigler Township
- Boggs Township
- Bradford Township
- Brisbin
- Burnside
- Burnside Township
- Chester Hill
- Chest Township
- Clearfield
- Coalport
- Cooper Township
- Covington Township
- Decatur Township
- Girard Township
- Goshen Township
- Glen Hope
- Graham Township
- Gulich Township
- Houtzdale
- Irvona
- Jordan Township
- Karthaus Township
- Knox Township
- Lawrence Township
- Morris Township
- Osceola Mills
- Pike Township
- Ramey
- Wallaceton
- Westover
- Woodward Township

== Representatives ==
Representative	Party	Years	District home	Note
Prior to 1969, seats were apportioned by county.
Paul J. Yahner	Democrat	1969 – 1980		
Edward J. Haluska	Democrat	1981 – 1994		
Gary Haluska	Democrat	1995 – 2014	Patton	Redistricting moved incumbent Tommy Sankey into this district; Haluska retired
Tommy Sankey	Republican	2015 – 2023		Previously represented the 74th district
Dallas Kephart	Republican	2023 – present		Incumbent

== Recent election results ==
PA House election, 2024: Pennsylvania House, District 73
Party	Candidate	Votes	%
Republican	Dallas Kephart (incumbent)	Unopposed	
Total votes		28,465	100.00
Republican hold			

PA House election, 2022: Pennsylvania House, District 73
Party	Candidate	Votes	%
Republican	Dallas Kephart	Unopposed	
Total votes		21,141	100.00
Republican hold			

PA House election, 2020: Pennsylvania House, District 73
Party	Candidate	Votes	%
Republican	Thomas Sankey III (incumbent)	Unopposed	
Total votes		21,141	100.00
Republican hold			

PA House election, 2018: Pennsylvania House, District 73
Party	Candidate	Votes	%
Republican	Thomas Sankey III (incumbent)	Unopposed	
Total votes		19,607	100.00
Republican hold			

PA House election, 2016: Pennsylvania House, District 73
Party	Candidate	Votes	%
Republican	Thomas Sankey III (incumbent)	18,631	71.11
Democratic	Fred Weaver	7,571	28.89
Total votes		26,202	100.00
Republican hold			
