= David H. Branson =

American politician (1827–1896)

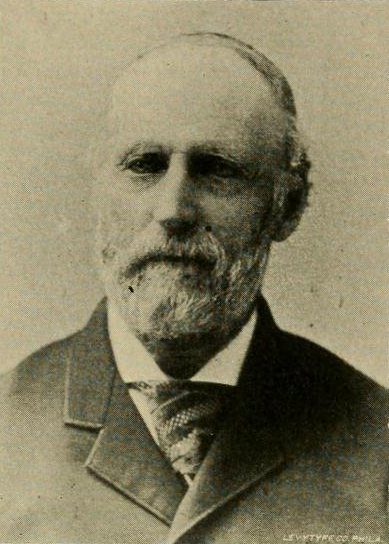
- Branson in a 1893 publication

Member of the Pennsylvania House of Representatives from the Chester County district
- In office 1891–1894 Serving with Joseph G. West and William Preston Snyder
- Preceded by: Lewis H. Evans, John Hickman, William W. McConnell, D. Smith Talbot
- Succeeded by: D. Smith Talbot, John H. Marshall, Thomas J. Philips, Daniel Foulke Moore

Personal details
- Born: David Hoopes Branson; August 31, 1827 Milltown, East Goshen Township, Pennsylvania, U.S.
- Died: October 19, 1896 (aged 69) Atglen, Pennsylvania, U.S.
- Resting place: East Brandywine Baptist Church Cemetery; Guthriesville, Pennsylvania, U.S.
- Party: Republican
- Occupation: Politician; educator; farmer

David Hoopes Branson (August 31, 1827 – October 19, 1896) was an American politician from Pennsylvania. He served as a member of the Pennsylvania House of Representatives, representing Chester County from 1891 to 1894.

== Early life ==
David Hoopes Branson was born on August 31, 1827, in Milltown, East Goshen Township, Pennsylvania. He was educated in subscription schools and attended Strode's Academy.

== Career ==
Branson taught school for several years. He was a clerk in the office of recorder of deeds during Edward Hibbard's term. He was a corn and oat farmer and served as the first vice president of the Pennsylvania Agricultural Society. He raised livestock and his oxen were known as the "Chester County Mammoth Roans" and his cow was called "General Grant".

Branson was a Republican. He served as a member of the Pennsylvania House of Representatives, representing Chester County from 1891 to 1894. He was a member of the committees of appropriations, agriculture, counties and townships, and centennial affairs and library. He introduced a bill to reduce the standard of a bushel of potatoes to 56 pounds (25 kg).

Branson was assigned to the agricultural department for the World's Columbian Exposition.

== Personal life ==
Branson's son James was a grocery manager. He died of kidney disease on October 19, 1896, at his home in Atglen. He was interred in East Brandywine Baptist Church Cemetery in Guthriesville.
