= William Preston Snyder =

American politician (1851–1920)

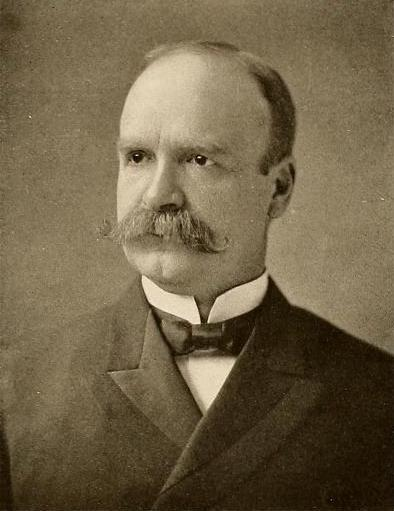
- Snyder in a 1907 publication

25th Auditor General of Pennsylvania
- In office 1904–1907
- Governor: Samuel W. Pennypacker
- Preceded by: Edmund B. Hardenbergh
- Succeeded by: Robert K. Young

President Pro Tempore of the Pennsylvania State Senate
- In office 1899–1902
- Preceded by: Daniel Spindler Walton
- Succeeded by: John Morin Scott

Member of the Pennsylvania Senate from the 19th district
- In office 1893–1904
- Preceded by: Septimus Evans Nivin

Member of the Pennsylvania House of Representatives from the Chester County district
- In office 1891–1892 Serving with David H. Branson and Joseph G. West
- Preceded by: Lewis H. Evans, John Hickman, William W. McConnell, D. Smith Talbot
- Succeeded by: D. Smith Talbot, John H. Marshall, Thomas J. Philips, Daniel Foulke Moore, Plummer E. Jefferis

Personal details
- Born: October 7, 1851 East Vincent Township, Chester County, Pennsylvania, U.S.
- Died: June 18, 1920 (aged 68) Kimberton, Pennsylvania, U.S.
- Resting place: East Village Reformed Cemetery; Spring City, Pennsylvania, U.S.
- Party: Republican
- Spouse: Elisabeth Friday (m. 1876)
- Children: 1
- Education: Millersville State Normal School, Ursinus College, University of Pennsylvania School of Medicine
- Occupation: Politician; physician
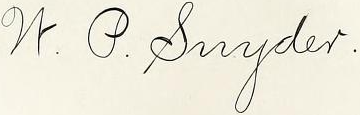
- Signature

William Preston Snyder (October 7, 1851 – June 18, 1920) was an American physician and politician who served as President Pro Tempore of the Pennsylvania Senate from 1899–1902 and Pennsylvania Auditor General from 1904–1907. He was a member of the Republican Party from Chester County. In 1908, Snyder was convicted in a graft scandal involving the furnishing of the Pennsylvania State Capitol and received a two-year prison sentence for conspiracy to defraud the state.

== Early life and education ==
Snyder was born in East Vincent Township, Pennsylvania, to Maria (née Shenkel) and George Snyder. His father was a farmer and brick manufacturer. Snyder attended Millersville State Normal School and Ursinus College, taught school in 1868 and 1869, and received his MD from the University of Pennsylvania in 1873. He practiced medicine from 1873 to 1886 and worked as Spring City postmaster from 1883 to 1885. He became a medical examiner for the Pennsylvania Railroad Company and prothonotary of Chester County in 1886.

== Political career ==
In fall of 1890, Snyder was elected to the Pennsylvania House of Representatives and served from 1891 to 1892, when he successfully ran to represent the 19th district in the Pennsylvania Senate, which he did from 1893 to 1904. He served as Senate president pro tempore from 1899 to 1902. He chaired the Senate Appropriations and Health and Sanitation committees and served on committees for Congressional Apportionment, Corporations, Education, Finance, Insurance, Judiciary Special, New Counties and New Seats, Mines and Mining, Public Roads and Highways, Railroads and Street Passenger Railways.

Snyder was elected Pennsylvania Auditor General in November 1903, winning by a margin of 237,602 votes. He held the office from 1904 through 1907. Scandal derailed his career when he, along with four other officials, faced charges of conspiracy to defraud the state in connection with the construction and furnishing of the state capitol. Although he maintained his innocence until his death, Snyder was convicted in December 1908, sentenced to two years in prison at the Eastern State Penitentiary, and ordered to pay a $500 fine. The state supreme court upheld the conviction and sentence on appeal in March 1910.

Snyder served as an elected delegate to the Pennsylvania Republican Conventions of 1878 and 1882 and chaired the Chester County Republican Committee in 1890, resigning when nominated for Senate. He was a Freemason and Knight Templar.

== Personal life ==
Snyder married schoolteacher Elisabeth Friday (or Elizabeth Fridy) on September 5, 1876. The couple had one son, Thomas B.

He died on June 18, 1920, more than a year after suffering a paralytic stroke, in Kimberton, Pennsylvania. He was interred at the East Village Reformed Cemetery in Spring City, Pennsylvania.
