= Thomas J. Philips =

American politician (1846–1939)

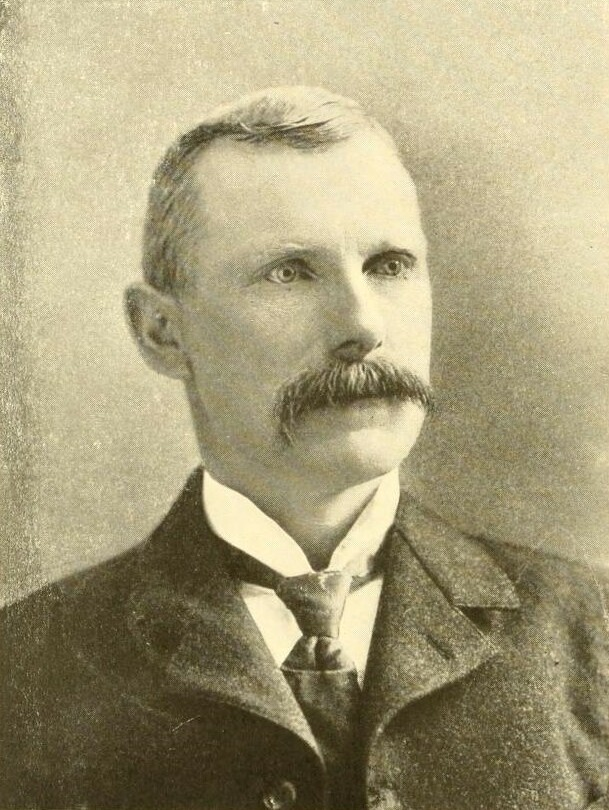
- Philips in 1895

Member of the Pennsylvania House of Representatives from the Chester County district
- In office 1895–1898 Serving with D. Smith Talbot, John H. Marshall, Daniel Foulke Moore, Plummer E. Jefferis
- Preceded by: David H. Branson, William P. Snyder, Joseph G. West

Personal details
- Born: Thomas Jones Philips; December 23, 1846 Atglen, Pennsylvania, U.S.
- Died: April 9, 1939 (aged 92) Atglen, Pennsylvania, U.S.
- Resting place: Pennington Cemetery; Atglen, Pennsylvania, U.S.
- Party: Republican
- Spouse: Harriet C. Chalfant (m. 1880)
- Children: 2
- Relatives: George Morris Philips (brother)
- Education: Lewisburg University
- Occupation: Politician; farmer; bank president; businessman

Thomas Jones Philips (December 23, 1846 – April 9, 1939) was an American politician from Pennsylvania. He served as a member of the Pennsylvania House of Representatives, representing Chester County from 1895 to 1898.

== Early life ==
Thomas Jones Philips was born on December 23, 1846, in Atglen, Pennsylvania (then Penningtonville), to Sarah (née Jones) and John M. Philips. His father was a farmer and Baptist deacon. His grandfather Thomas Jones was associate judge and inspector of the Pennsylvania militia. Philips attended public schools and graduated from Lewisburg University (later Bucknell University) in 1867 with a bachelor's degree. He was a member of Sigma Chi.

== Career ==
After graduating, Philips engaged in agricultural pursuits for two years at the family farm. He moved west and worked as a store clerk. In 1873, he moved back to Atglen and was appointed assistant messenger of the Pennsylvania House of Representatives. He later associated with Alexander Goodwin. He worked in the firm Goodman & Philips from 1873 to 1875. He also helped operate Hiberni Iron Works in Chester County from 1873 to 1877. In 1877, he returned to farming the family farm of 240 acres (97 ha) and 40 cows. He continued farming until at least 1903.

Philips was a Republican. He was justice of the peace and school director of Atglen. In 1882, he was elected delegate to Ohio Republican Convention. He served as a member of the Pennsylvania House of Representatives, representing Chester County from 1895 to 1898. He advocated for the Oleomargerine Bill and introduced the Hamilton Road Bill. He ran again in 1898, but lost. He served as deputy coroner of Chester County. He served on the state board of agriculture.

Philips contributed to Pennsylvania magazines and papers. He was director and vice president of Christiana National Bank. He helped organize the Atglen National Bank and served as its first president from 1903 to 1936. He was chairman of the board of directors of Atglen National Bank at the time of his death. From 1925 to his death, he was president of the Chester County Mutual Fire Insurance Company. He was an organizer of the Atglen Water Company and was its president. He was lecturer at the Farmers' Institute in Chester County.

== Personal life ==
Philips married Harriet C. Chalfant, daughter of Cloud Chalfant, in 1880. They had two children, Sarah J. and Alice L. In 1877, he moved his family to a farm obtained via a Penn land grant. He left the farm in 1906. He lived in West Sadsbury Township, Pennsylvania. His brother was educator George Morris Philips.

Philips died on April 9, 1939, in Atglen. He was interred at Penningtonville Cemetery in Atglen.
