= Harry Lewis (politician) =

American politician (born 1941)

Member of the Pennsylvania House of Representatives from the 74th district
- In office January 6, 2015 – November 30, 2018
- Preceded by: Tommy Sankey
- Succeeded by: Dan K. Williams

Personal details
- Born: February 1941 (age 85) Queens, New York City, New York, U.S.
- Party: Republican
- Spouse: Regina
- Children: 3
- Education: Winston-Salem State University (B.S.); West Chester State College (M.A.); Cheyney University of Pennsylvania (M.Ed)
- Alma mater: Coatesville Area High School

Harry Lewis Jr. (born February 1941) is an American politician who served in the Pennsylvania House of Representatives, representing the 74th District from 2015 until his retirement in 2018.

== Early life and education ==
Lewis was born in February 1941, in Queens, New York City. As a child, Lewis lived in Carver Court. He graduated from Coatesville Area High School in 1959. Lewis earned a Bachelor of Science degree in health and physical education from Winston-Salem State University in 1963, a Master of Arts degree in wellness and fitness from West Chester State College in 1980, and a Master of Education from Cheyney University of Pennsylvania in 1999.

== Career ==
Lewis worked at Coatesville Area High School for 36 years eventually becoming the school's principal.

=== Pennsylvania House of Representatives ===
Lewis was first elected in 2014 to represent the 74th District in the Pennsylvania House of Representatives. He won re-election from 2016, but declined to run again in 2018.

During his tenure, Lewis was the only African American in the Republican caucus.
