= Galushka =

Galushka or Halushka (Ukrainian: Галушка, romanized: Halushka), from Ukrainian: галушка, meaning halushka, traditional dumpling-like food, is a gender-neutral Ukrainian surname. Notable people with the surname include:

- Aleksandr Galushka (born 1975), Russian politician
- Olena Halushka (born 1989), Ukrainian politician and activist
- Vera Galushka-Duyunova (1945–2012), Russian volleyball player
- Vira Halushka better known under the stage name Vera Brezhneva (born 1982), Ukrainian singer, television presenter and actress

== See also ==
- Haluska
- Halushko
