= Tommy Sankey =

American politician

Member of the Pennsylvania House of Representatives
- In office January 1, 2013 – November 30, 2022
- Preceded by: Bud George
- Succeeded by: Dallas Kephart
- Constituency: 74th District (2013-2014); 73rd District (2015-2022)

Personal details
- Born: September 21, 1980 (age 46)
- Party: Republican
- Education: St. Francis University

Thomas R. Sankey III (born September 21, 1980) is a Republican former member of the Pennsylvania House of Representatives. Originally, he represented the 74th District from 2013 to 2014. Following redistricting, Sankey represented the 73rd District from 2015 until 2022.

== Early life and education ==
Sankey attended the Clearfield Area School District and received a bachelor's degree in accounting from St. Francis University. Sankey played on the Clearfield High School undefeated 1998 football team and briefly for the St. Francis football team in college. After college, he worked as an accountant before returning to the family business, R&G Fabrication.

== Political career ==
=== 2012 election ===
Thomas Sankey announced his candidacy for State Representative for the 74th State Representative district that was being vacated by long time serving member Bud George. He defeated the Democratic nominee and Clearfield County Commissioner Mark McCracken 60%-39%. This was the first time the district was held by a Republican since 1975, and was Sankey's closest election.

=== 2016 election ===
Sankey was only formally challenged for his position on one occasion, which was during the 2016 election. This was the Representative's reelection campaign to his third term to the General Assembly. He was challenged by Clearfield County Democratic Committee Treasurer Fred Weaver. He won a third term by a margin of 71%-29%. Sankey ran unopposed in his 2014, 2018, and 2020 campaigns.

=== Tenure ===
Sankey strongly opposed green energy initiatives proposed by Governor Tom Wolf. He was a critic of Governor Wolf's administration, accusing the Governor of partisan rhetoric during the 2016 budget proposal process. In June 2020, Sankey and 34 other Republican lawmakers signed articles of impeachment against Governor Wolf. In February 2021, he again signed articles of impeachment against Wolf, this time with 30 Republican lawmakers. Both articles of impeachment were in relation to the Governor's response to COVID-19 and his emergency declaration. The Republican lawmakers accused the Governor of overreach and circumventing the legislative branch. Both articles of impeachment failed to advance out of the Republican-controlled judiciary committee.

Sankey was a strong advocate for the energy sector (primarily coal and gas), advocating for a reduced and balanced budget, opposing tax increases, and supporting the elimination of the inheritance tax, going as far as to equate inheritance tax to "stealing from children". He was endorsed by the NRA Political Victory Fund and received a 0% rating from Planned Parenthood. Over the course of five campaigns, he received over $5.5 million dollars from the energy sector and $4.2 million from the banking and finance sector in campaign donations.

In 2018, he supported State Senator Scott Wagner in his unsuccessful attempt to defeat Governor Tom Wolf in the 2018 election cycle.

Sankey was a staunch supporter of President Donald Trump's administration and played a central role in the section within the Republican Party who attempted to overturn Pennsylvania's election results based upon the false narrative from the Trump administration that the election was stolen after Trump's defeat by then-candidate Joe Biden. This included a motion to the Pennsylvania Commonwealth Court that urged the court to void Pennsylvania's election results, which Sankey signed along with other conservative lawmakers in the state house. There was strong consensus amongst voting experts and government agencies that there was no widespread fraud, and all thirteen lawsuits alleging electoral fraud in Pennsylvania would be dismissed.

Sankey endorsed Jeff Bartos in the 2022 Pennsylvania Senate election.

Sankey formerly sat on the Consumer Affairs, Subcommittee on Public Utilities, Environmental Resources & Energy Subcommittee on Mining, Finance, and Rules committees. Sankey was appointed as Deputy Chairman of House Majority Policy Committee in 2019 and then appointed Deputy Whip in 2020 by Majority Whip Donna Oberlander.

On February 1, 2022, Sankey announced that he would not seek reelection and attorney Dallas Kephart would be elected as his successor.

Pennsylvania House of Representatives
Preceded by Bud George	Member of the Pennsylvania House of Representatives from the 74th district 2013–2015	Succeeded by Harry Lewis
Preceded by Gary Haluska	Member of the Pennsylvania House of Representatives from the 73rd district 2015–2023	Succeeded by Dallas Kephart
