= Dallas Kephart =

American politician

Member of the Pennsylvania House of Representatives from the 73rd district
- Incumbent
- Assumed office January 3, 2023
- Preceded by: Tommy Sankey

Personal details
- Born: c. 1996 (age 26-27) Pennsylvania, U.S.
- Party: Republican
- Education: Lock Haven University of Pennsylvania (B.A.); Penn State Law (J.D.)
- Alma mater: Phillipsburg-Osceola High School
- Website: repkephart.com

Dallas Paul Kephart (born c. 1996) is an American politician and attorney who currently represents the 73rd District in the Pennsylvania House of Representatives as a Republican since 2023.

== Early life ==
Kephart was born in Pennsylvania and grew up in Decatur Township in Clearfield County. He graduated from Phillipsburg-Osceola High School in 2014. Kephart earned a Bachelor of Arts degree in political science from Lock Haven University of Pennsylvania in 2018, graduating magna cum laude.

While earning his undergraduate degree, Kephart interned for Congressman Glenn Thompson and worked as a coal miner during the summer months. While earning his Juris Doctor at Penn State Law, Kephart clerked for the U.S. House Oversight Committee. He finished law school in 2021, and subsequently became a licensed attorney in Pennsylvania, working for a judge on the Commonwealth Court of Pennsylvania.

== Political career ==
In 2022, Kephart won the three-way Republican primary to represent the 73rd District in the Pennsylvania House of Representatives. The seat was open following the retirement of Tommy Sankey, and Kephart faced no opponent in the general election.

Kephart has taken a pro-energy industry stance in the State House, voting against bills he deems hostile to the industry and lobbying fellow lawmakers to do the same. He also co-sponsored a bill to pull Pennsylvania out of the Regional Greenhouse Gas Initiative.

Kephart champions a commitment to the Constitution, regulatory reform, and economics. Kephart is the prime sponsor of the REINS Act. For the 2023-2024 session, Kephart was rated as the most conservative member of the House of Representatives.|https://www.tpaction.com/scorecard/legislators/dallaskephart|

== Electoral history ==
2022 Pennsylvania House of Representatives Republican primary election, District 73
| Party | Candidate | Votes | % |
|---|---|---|---|
| Republican | Dallas Kephart | 6,072 | 61.75 |
| Republican | Derek A. Walker | 2,604 | 26.48 |
| Republican | John A. Sobel | 1,152 | 11.72 |
| Write-in | | 5 | 0.05 |
| Total votes | | 9,833 | 100.00 |

2022 Pennsylvania House of Representatives election, District 73
| Party | Candidate | Votes | % |
|---|---|---|---|
| Republican | Dallas Kephart | 21,138 | 96.23 |
| Write-in | | 827 | 3.77 |
| Total votes | | 21,965 | 100.00 |

2024 Pennsylvania House of Representatives election, District 73
| Party | Candidate | Votes | % |
|---|---|---|---|
| Republican | Dallas Kephart (incumbent) | 28,465 | 98.30 |
| Write-in | | 493 | 1.70 |
| Total votes | | 28,958 | 100.00 |

== Committee assignments ==
Kephart sits on the Energy (Republican Secretary), Finance, Finance Subcommittee on Tax Modernization and Reform (Republican Chair), Gaming Oversight, Government Oversight, and Housing & Community Development committees.

== Sponsored legislation ==
In the 2025 House Session, Kephart helped sponsor HB68, HB217, HB243, HB418, and HB424.
