= Dan K. Williams =

American politician (born 1956)

The Reverend Dan K. Williams

Member of the Pennsylvania House of Representatives from the 74th district
- Incumbent
- Assumed office January 1, 2019
- Preceded by: Harry Lewis Jr.

Personal details
- Born: February 8, 1956 (age 70) Philadelphia, Pennsylvania, U.S.
- Party: Democratic
- Spouse: Baleria Alston
- Children: 3
- Education: Geneva College (B.S.); Biblical Theological Seminary (M.Div, D.Min)
- Alma mater: Overbrook High School
- Website: Official website

Dan K. Williams (born February 8, 1956) is an American politician and pastor. A Democrat, he has represented the 74th district in the Pennsylvania House of Representatives since 2018.

== Early life and education ==
Williams was born on February 8, 1956, in Philadelphia, Pennsylvania, to Willa and Wallace Williams. Williams grew up in West Philadelphia. He graduated from Overbrook High School. In 1992, Williams earned a bachelor of science degree in management from Geneva College.

== Pastoral career ==
Since the 1990s, Williams has served as senior pastor at New Life Christ Fellowship Church in Coatesville, Pennsylvania. Williams earned his Master of Divinity and his Doctor of Ministry from Biblical Theological Seminary in 2006 and 2010, respectively. He would later become assistant professor of practical theology at the seminary, and become the first African American on its Board of Trustees.

== Political career ==
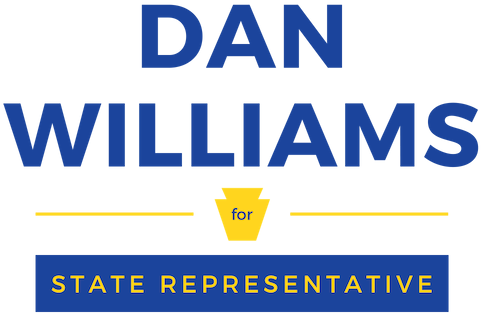
Williams' campaign logo

Following the retirement of Pennsylvania State Representative Harry Lewis Jr., in 2018, Williams ran to fill the now open 74th District seat. A lifelong Democrat, Williams emerged victorious in a three-way primary election, and later defeated Republican Amber Little-Turner in the general election. Williams won reelection in 2020 and 2022, besting Republican challenger Dale Hensel both times.

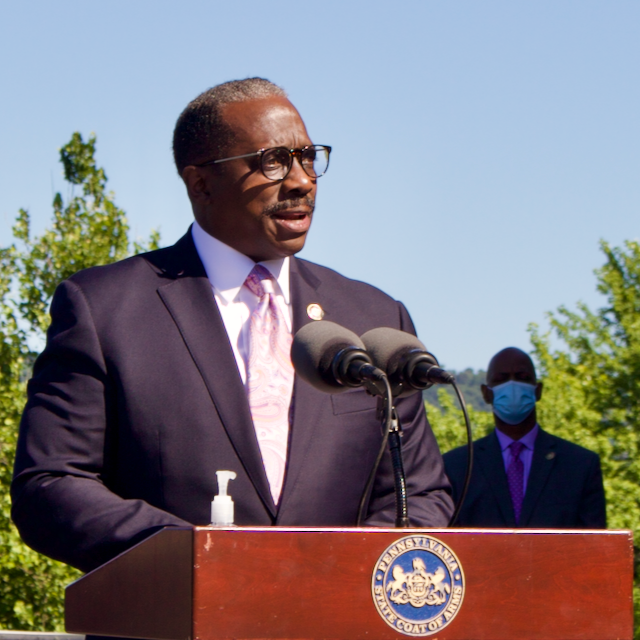
Williams speaking at the signing ceremony for his Act 59 of 2020.

During his first term, Williams wrote a bill focused on updating police training requirements in regards to de-escalation techniques, appropriate use of force, and communicating with individuals of varying backgrounds. The bill was in response to calls for police reform following the murder of George Floyd, and passed unanimously in both the Pennsylvania State House and Pennsylvania Senate. On July 14, 2020, Governor Tom Wolf signed Williams' bill into law as Act 59 of 2020.

== Personal life ==
Williams and his wife, Baleria Alston, have three children. He resides in Sadsbury Township in Chester County, Pennsylvania.

== Electoral history ==
2018 Pennsylvania House of Representatives Democratic primary election, District 74
Party	Candidate	Votes	%
Democratic	Dan K. Williams	1,786	43.50
Democratic	Josh Maxwell	1,506	36.68
Democratic	Frank Pryor	775	18.87
Write-in		39	0.95
Total votes		4,106	100.00

2018 Pennsylvania House of Representatives election, District 74
Party	Candidate	Votes	%
Democratic	Dan K. Williams	14,826	61.36
Republican	Amber Little-Turner	9,294	38.47
Write-in		42	0.17
Total votes		24,162	100.00
Democratic gain from Republican			

2020 Pennsylvania House of Representatives election, District 74
Party	Candidate	Votes	%
Democratic	Dan K. Williams (incumbent)	21,712	64.27
Republican	Dale Hensel	12,017	35.57
Write-in		53	0.16
Total votes		33,782	100.00
Democratic hold			

2022 Pennsylvania House of Representatives election, District 74
Party	Candidate	Votes	%
Democratic	Dan K. Williams (incumbent)	13,289	56.13
Republican	Dale Hensel	10,346	43.70
Write-in		39	0.16
Total votes		23,674	100.00
Democratic hold			

Political offices
Pennsylvania House of Representatives
Preceded by Harry Lewis Jr.	Member of the Pennsylvania House of Representatives from the 74th district 2019–present	Incumbent
