= Gary Haluska =

American politician

Member of the Pennsylvania House of Representatives from the 73rd district
- In office January 3, 1995 – January 6, 2015
- Preceded by: Edward Haluska
- Succeeded by: Tommy Sankey

Personal details
- Born: March 17, 1950 (age 76) Patton, Pennsylvania
- Party: Democratic
- Spouse: Amy
- Education: Williamsport Area Community College

Gary Haluska (born March 17, 1950) is a former Democratic member of the Pennsylvania House of Representatives.
