= John H. Marshall (politician) =

American politician (1841–1913)

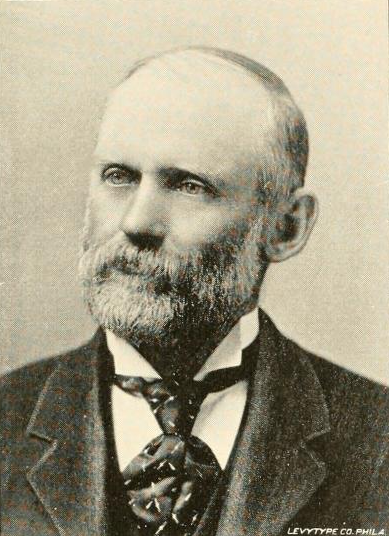
- Marshall in a 1895 publication

Member of the Pennsylvania House of Representatives from the Chester County district
- In office 1895–1898 Serving with D. Smith Talbot, Thomas J. Philips, Daniel Foulke Moore, Plummer E. Jefferis
- Preceded by: David H. Branson, William Preston Snyder, Joseph G. West

Personal details
- Born: John Henry Marshall; January 19, 1841 East Marlborough Township, Pennsylvania, U.S.
- Died: December 23, 1913 (aged 72) Kennett Square, Pennsylvania, U.S.
- Resting place: Unionville Cemetery; Unionville, Chester County, Pennsylvania, U.S.
- Party: Republican
- Occupation: Politician; farmer

John Henry Marshall (January 19, 1841 – December 23, 1913) was an American politician from Pennsylvania. He served as a member of the Pennsylvania House of Representatives, representing Chester County from 1895 to 1898.

== Early life ==
John Henry Marshall was born on January 19, 1841, in East Marlborough Township, Pennsylvania. He attended Millersville Normal School (later Millersville University of Pennsylvania) and Deerfield Academy in Massachusetts and Kennett Square in Unionville and Ercildoun Academies in Pennsylvania. His teacher at Ercildoun was Smedley Darlington.

== Career ==
At the age of 18, Marshall started farming. In 1864, he took over his father's 150 acres (61 ha) farm in East Marlborough Township. Later in life, he retired in Unionville. He was also a dry goods and grocery merchant. He was elected president of the West Chester, Unionville, and Western Electric Railway Company on May 10, 1892.

Marshall was a Republican. He served as a member of the Pennsylvania House of Representatives, representing Chester County from 1895 to 1898. He withdrew himself from consideration for the following election.

== Personal life ==
Marshall died on December 23, 1913, at his home in Kennett Square. He was interred at Unionville Cemetery.
