= Daniel Foulke Moore =

American politician (1841–1919)

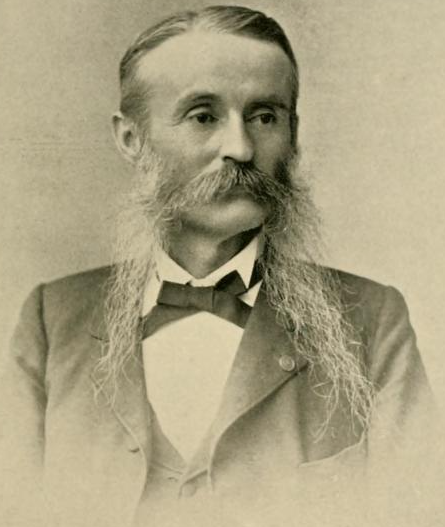
- Moore in a 1893 publication

Member of the Pennsylvania House of Representatives from the Chester County district
- In office 1893–1898 Serving with D. Smith Talbot, John H. Marshall, Thomas J. Philips, Plummer E. Jefferis
- Preceded by: David H. Branson, William Preston Snyder, Joseph G. West

Personal details
- Born: July 24, 1841 Upper Merion Township, Pennsylvania
- Died: January 1, 1919 (aged 77) Philadelphia, Pennsylvania, U.S.
- Resting place: Valley Friends Burial Ground; Wayne, Pennsylvania, U.S.
- Party: Republican
- Spouses: Melissa Conard (m. 1867; died 1869) Emily M. Ashenfelter (m. 1877)
- Children: 2
- Occupation: Politician; telegrapher; businessman

Daniel Foulke Moore (July 24, 1841 – January 1, 1919) was an American politician from Pennsylvania. He served as a member of the Pennsylvania House of Representatives, representing Chester County from 1893 to 1898.

== Early life ==
Daniel Foulke Moore was born on July 24, 1841, in Upper Merion Township, Pennsylvania, to Phoebe (née Foulke) and Edwin Moore. His father was a farmer in Montgomery County. Moore grew up on the family farm and attended common schools. In 1856, he attended a private school in West Chester for one term. He also attended Gwynedd Seminary, which was run by his grandfather Joseph Foulke.

== Career ==
In the spring of 1862, Moore became a telegraph operator for Reading Company in Reading, Pennsylvania. He worked for Reading Company at Reading and in Harrisburg until 1862. In August 1862, Moore enlisted as a private of Company E of the 128th Pennsylvania Infantry Regiment. He served with them nine months. He then served with the First Brigade, First Division of the XII Corps. With them, he participated in the battles of Antietam and Chancellorsville. He was honorably discharged in May 1863. After the expiration of his term of service, he re-enlisted with Company D of the 31st Pennsylvania Infantry Regiment (Pennsylvania Emergency Militia), and he remained with them for four months. In November 1863, he returned to work with the Reading Company as a telegraph operator and was stationed in Phoenixville. He worked there until his resignation in January 1870.

Moore formed a firm with E. L. Caswell called Caswell & Moore, a stove, tin and roofing business. The business was based in Phoenixville and worked with tin, slate and corrugated iron roofs. The firm was originally founded in 1855 and the store was located at 237 Bridge Street. In 1871, Moore was appointed assistant adjutant general of General J. R. Dobson of the Pennsylvania National Guard, commanding the 10th division. He attained the rank of lieutenant colonel.

Moore was a Republican. He served as burgess in Phoenixville. He served as a member of the Pennsylvania House of Representatives, representing Chester County from 1893 to 1898.

== Personal life ==
In 1867, Moore married Melissa Conard of Upper Merion Township. They had a son, but he died at three months of age. His wife died in 1869. In 1877, Moore married Emily M. Ashenfelter, daughter of Henry Ashenfelter, of Phoenixville. They had one daughter, Martha Washington.

Moore died on January 1, 1919, in Philadelphia. He was interred at Valley Friends Burial Ground in Wayne.
