= Patton Historic District =

Historic district in Pennsylvania, United States

- U.S. National Register of Historic Places
- U.S. Historic district
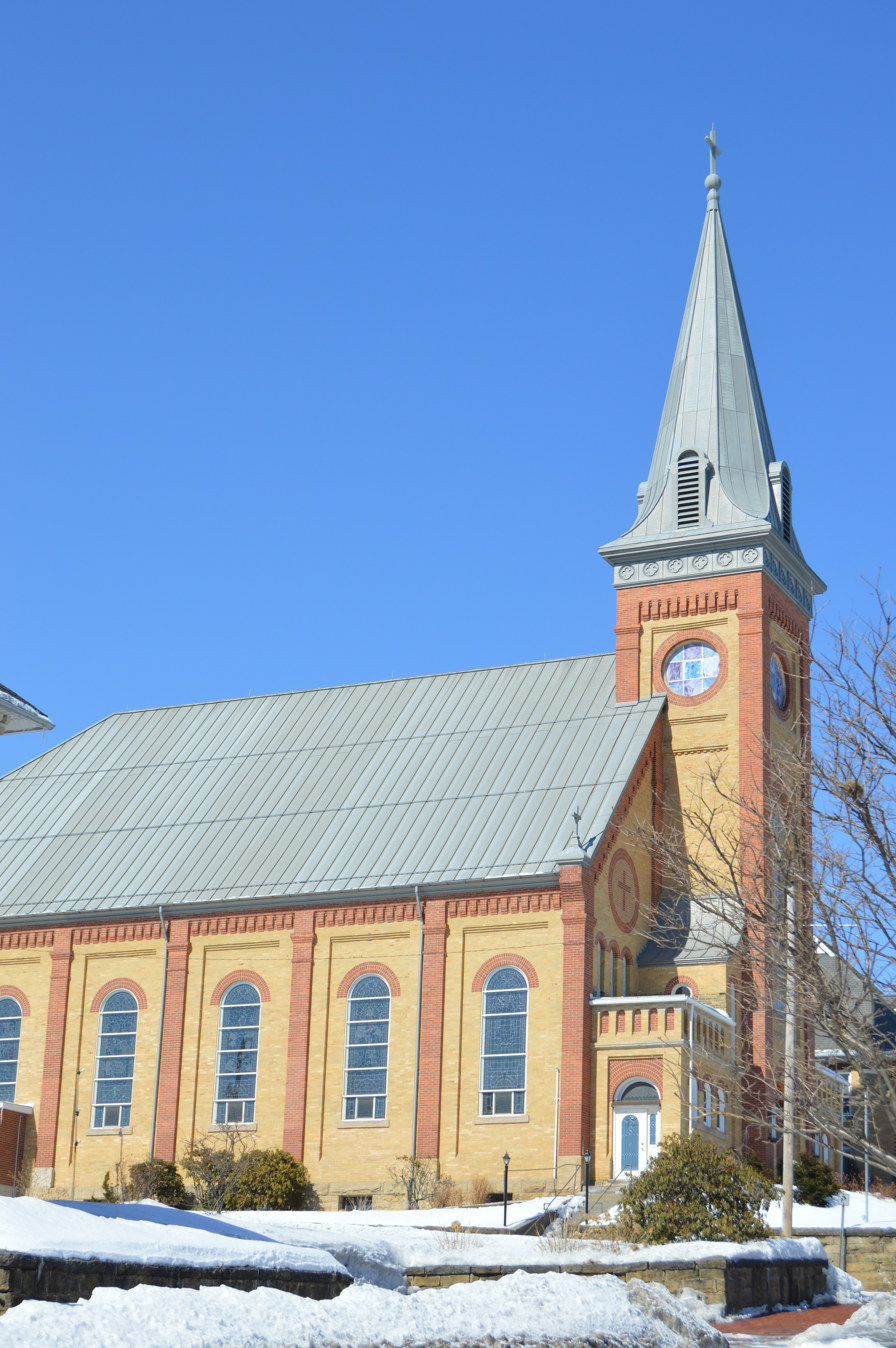
- St. Mary's Catholic Church

- Location within Pennsylvania Location within the United States
- Location: Roughly bounded by 5th, Beech, 6th, Palmer Aves. and Terra Cotta St., Patton, Pennsylvania
- Coordinates: 40°38′10″N 78°39′04″W
- Area: 15 acres (6.1 ha)
- Built: 1892
- Architect: Robinson & Snyder; Goff, L., et al.
- Architectural style: American Foursquare, Colonial Revival, Romanesque Revival
- NRHP reference No.: 96000714
- Added to NRHP: June 28, 1996

The Patton Historic District is a national historic district that is located in Patton in Cambria County, Pennsylvania, United States.

It was listed on the National Register of Historic Places in 1996.

== History and architectural features ==
This district includes forty-two contributing buildings that are located in a predominantly residential area of Patton. The predominant architectural style is American Foursquare, with some notable examples of Colonial Revival and Romanesque Revival styles. Notable buildings include St. Mary's Church (1899), St. Mary's Rectory (1899), St. Mary's School (1913), the A. O. Summerville House (c. 1897), the W. H. Sanford House (c. 1897), the Charles Rhody House (c. 1890), Dr. Stiles House (1907), the Prindible Houses (c. 1893-1897), Trinity United Methodist Church (1901), St. Peter and Paul Orthodox Church (1904), the Cambria Heights Middle School (1894), and Patton High School (1903).
