= Austin Harrier =

American politician

Austin M. Harrier

Member of the Pennsylvania House of Representatives from the 74th district
- In office January 7, 1969 – November 30, 1974
- Preceded by: District Created
- Succeeded by: Bud George

Member of the Pennsylvania House of Representatives from the Clearfield County district
- In office January 3, 1963 – November 30, 1968

Personal details
- Born: April 7, 1912 Woodland, Pennsylvania
- Died: September 24, 2000 (aged 88) Clearfield County, Pennsylvania
- Party: Republican

Austin M. Harrier (April 7, 1912 – September 24, 2000) was a Republican member of the Pennsylvania House of Representatives.
