= Edward Haluska =

American politician

Edward J. Haluska

Member of the Pennsylvania House of Representatives from the 73rd district
- In office 1981–1994
- Preceded by: Paul Yahner
- Succeeded by: Gary Haluska

Personal details
- Born: August 18, 1916 Patton, Pennsylvania
- Died: June 12, 2002 (aged 85) Hastings, Pennsylvania
- Party: Democratic

Edward J. Haluska (August 18, 1916 – June 12, 2002) was a former Democratic member of the Pennsylvania House of Representatives. He died of pancreatic cancer in 2002.
