= Joseph G. West =

American politician (1834–1917)

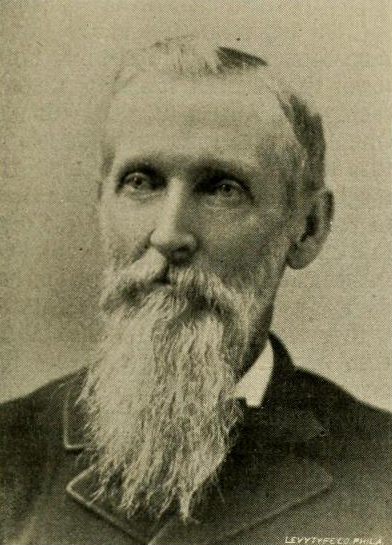
- West in a 1893 publication

Member of the Pennsylvania House of Representatives from the Chester County district
- In office 1891–1894 Serving with David H. Branson and William Preston Snyder
- Preceded by: Lewis H. Evans, John Hickman, William W. McConnell, D. Smith Talbot
- Succeeded by: D. Smith Talbot, John H. Marshall, Thomas J. Philips, Daniel Foulke Moore

Personal details
- Born: May 1834 East Pikeland Township, Pennsylvania, U.S.
- Died: February 10, 1917 (aged 82) Kemblesville, Pennsylvania, U.S.
- Resting place: Union Hill Cemetery; Kennett Square, Pennsylvania, U.S.
- Party: Republican
- Education: University of Pennsylvania
- Occupation: Politician; physician; store owner

Joseph G. West (May 1834 – February 10, 1917) was an American politician from Pennsylvania. He served as a member of the Pennsylvania House of Representatives, representing Chester County from 1891 to 1894.

== Early life ==
Joseph G. West was born on May 2 or 22, 1834, in East Pikeland Township, Pennsylvania, to David West. He grew up on his father's farm. At 17, he attended Strodie's Seminary near Lenape for one year. He then attended Oakdale Seminary Pughtown for two years.

After his studies, West taught at a public school in Jonestown, Lebanon County, Pennsylvania. He then studied medicine with Dr. Morris Tussell of Chester Springs. He graduated from the University of Pennsylvania in 1860.

== Career ==
In September 1860, he started practicing medicine in Kemblesville. In 1887, he left his medical practice and drug business to his son F. B. West. He was postmaster of Kemblesville from 1862 to 1872 and from 1875 to 1885.

West was a Republican. He served as a member of the Pennsylvania House of Representatives, representing Chester County from 1891 to 1894. He was school director of his township for fifteen years.

== Personal life ==
In 1887, he moved to his farm in Kemblesville.

West died on February 10, 1917, at his home in Kemblesville. He was interred in Union Hill Cemetery in Kennett Square.
