= Bud George =

American politician

Member of the Pennsylvania House of Representatives from the 74th district
- In office January 3, 1975 – December 31, 2012
- Preceded by: Austin Harrier
- Succeeded by: Tommy Sankey

Personal details
- Born: December 23, 1927 Houtzdale, Pennsylvania
- Died: September 1, 2017 (aged 89) Houtzdale, Pennsylvania
- Party: Democratic
- Spouse: Edna Mae (1934-2024)
- Children: Edwina, Candace, Kim, Edmond, Susan Faye, and Jake (deceased)

Camille "Bud" George (December 23, 1927 – September 1, 2017) was an American politician.

== Biography ==
Born in Houtzdale, Pennsylvania on December 23, 1927, George graduated from Houtzdale High School in 1944, and then served in the United States Navy during World War II.

After serving as mayor of Houtzdale, George was elected to the Pennsylvania House of Representatives, where he represented his constituents from 1974 until 2012. He was a Democrat.

In a 2002 PoliticsPA feature story designating politicians with yearbook superlatives, he was named the "Toughest to Work For."

== Death ==
George died in Houtzdale, Pennsylvania on September 1, 2017.
