= Atglen, Pennsylvania =

Borough in Pennsylvania, US

- Borough
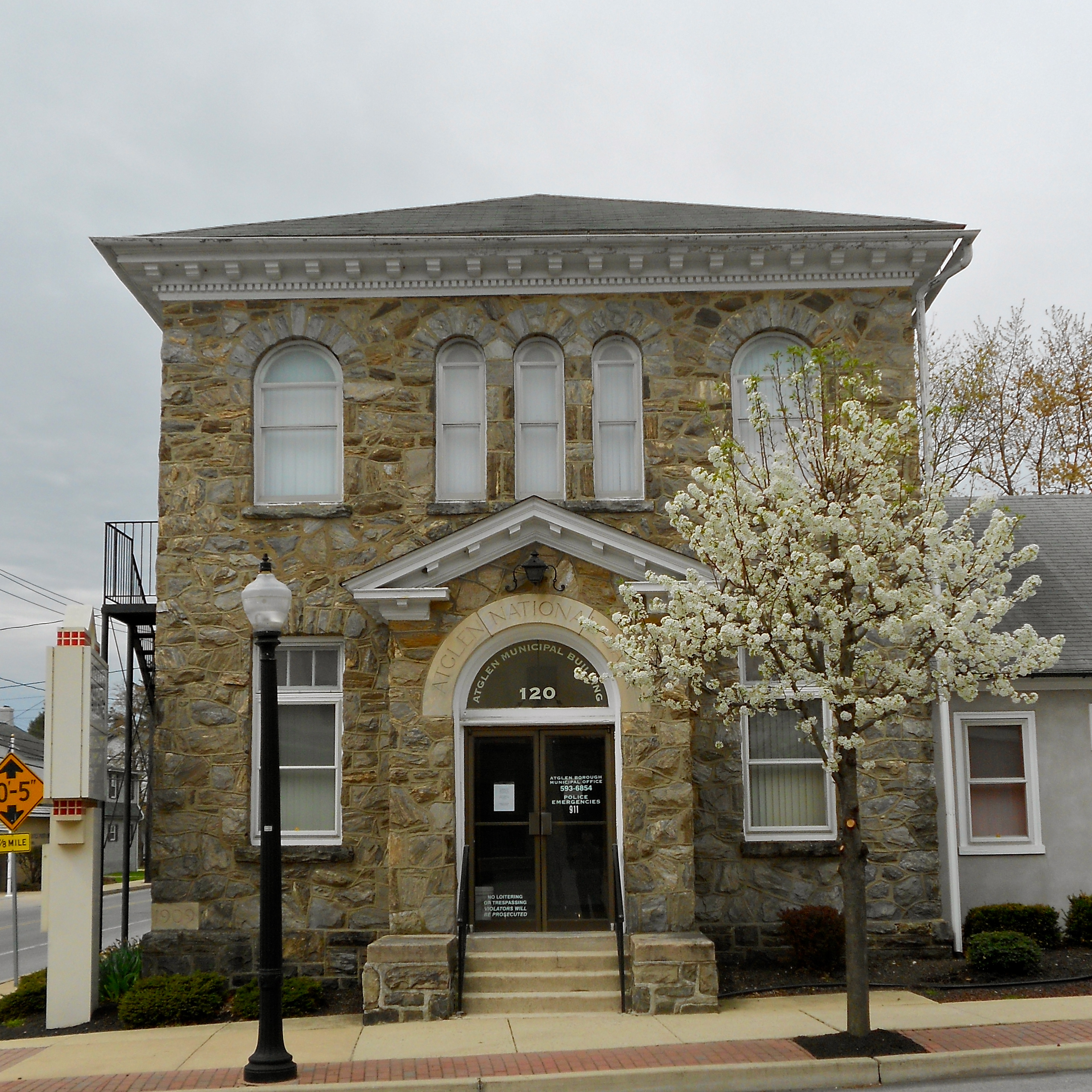
- Atglen Municipal Building in April 2015

- Location of Atglen in Chester County, Pennsylvania (left) and of Atglen in Pennsylvania (right)

- Location of Atglen in Pennsylvania Atglen (the United States)
- Coordinates: 39°56′53″N 75°58′26″W
- Country: United States
- State: Pennsylvania
- County: Chester

Area
  - Total: 0.88 sq mi (2.28 km^{2})
  - Land: 0.88 sq mi (2.27 km^{2})
  - Water: 0.0077 sq mi (0.02 km^{2})
- Elevation: 489 ft (149 m)

Population (2020)
  - Total: 1,313
  - Density: 1,501.3/sq mi (579.65/km^{2})
- Time zone: UTC-5 (EST)
  - Summer (DST): UTC-4 (EDT)
- ZIP Code: 19310
- Area code: 610
- FIPS code: 42-03384
- Website: http://www.atglen.org

Atglen is a borough in Chester County, Pennsylvania, United States. According to the 2020 census, its population is 1,311.

== History ==
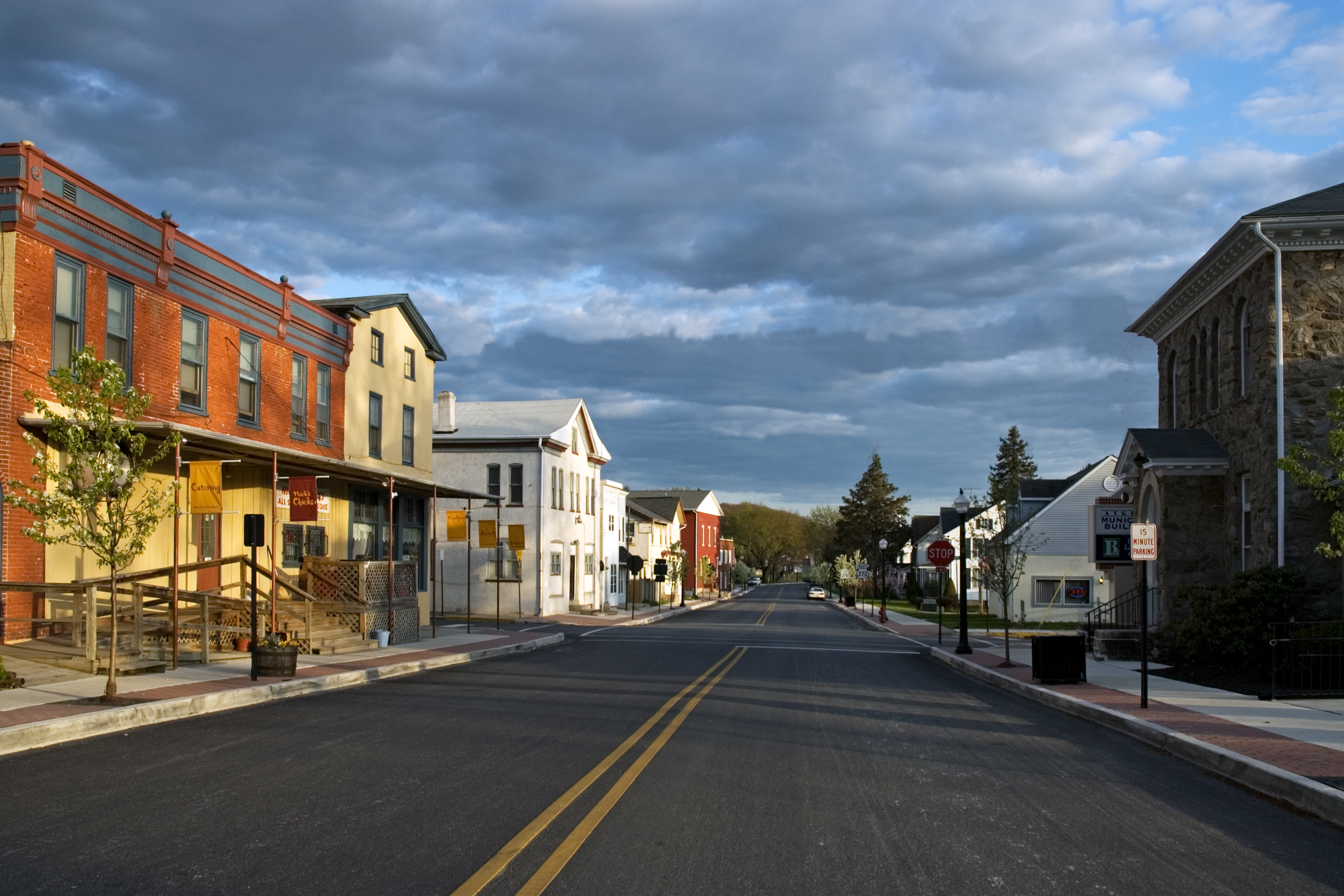
Main Street in Atglen

Present-day Atglen was originally a wilderness where Native Americans made paths that cut across this area when they traveled from Paxtang in present-day Harrisburg to present day New Castle, Delaware to trade with the Swedes and later the English. The Great Minquas Path was one of these trails.

=== 18th century ===
In 1717, Sadsbury Township was organized. It covered a large territory, including in whole or in part the present-day townships of Sadsbury, West Sadsbury, West Caln, Valley, East Fallowfield, West Fallowfield, and Highland; the boroughs of Atglen, Parkesburg, Modena, and South Coatesville; the city of Coatesville; and parts of Lancaster County. In August 1728, several inhabitants petitioned the court to separate Sadsbury from Fallowfield because of the former's size. In November of that year, the township was subdivided into East and West Sadsbury, and in 1729, upon the division of Chester County into Lancaster and Chester counties, the line between the two divisions of the township was made to conform to the county line.

Drawn by the township's farmland during the mid-18th century, more settlers arrived to Atglen. The Native Americans' trails became horse tracks and later wagon tracks as farmers shipped their goods to market in Philadelphia; Newport, Delaware; and New Castle, Delaware. The old Provincial Highway, as authorized by the government, was laid out in 1730. Newport Road, leading to the ore mines at Cornwall in Lebanon County, was laid out in 1796.

In 1720, Presbyterians formed the area's earliest organized religious group: what is known today as the Upper Octorara Presbyterian Church. They were followed by the Quakers who in 1724 founded the Sadsbury Meeting House. A year later, English settlers formed St. John's Church.

Andrew Moore (1688–1753), who had been influential with Samuel Miller in founding Sadsbury Meeting House, built a tub mill on his property.

=== 19th century ===
The original settlement in the town's current location was known as Penningtonville, and a post office by that name was established there in 1842. However, by the 1870s, the name Atglen was in common usage. In 1876, the court in West Chester made an official decree incorporating the village of Penningtonville as the "Borough of Atglen."

== Geography ==
Atglen is located at 39°56′53″N 75°58′26″W (39.948106, -75.973887).

According to the U.S. Census Bureau, the borough has a total area of 0.9 square miles (2.3 km^{2}), all land.

== Transportation ==
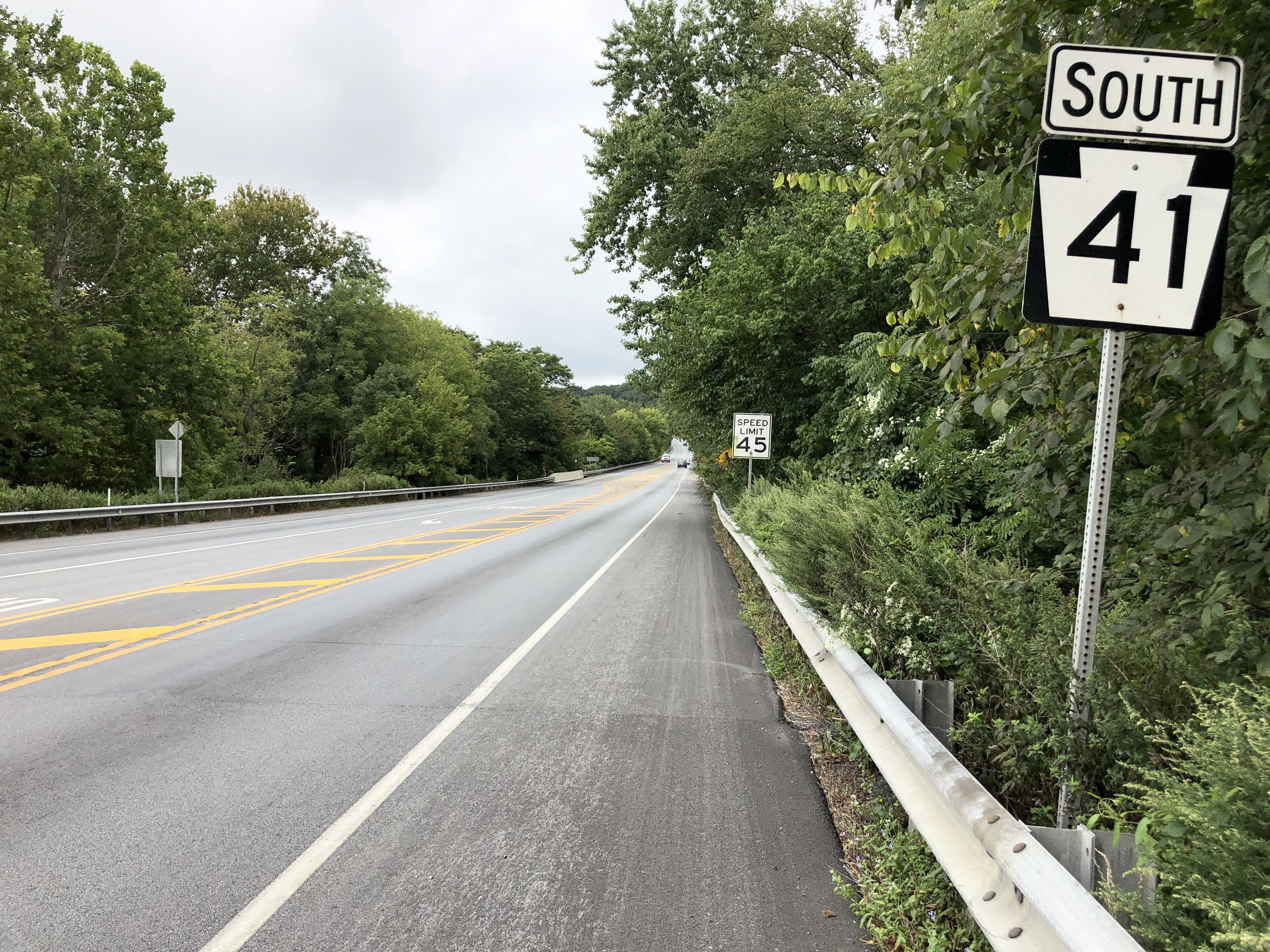
PA Route 41 southbound in Atglen

As of 2020, there were 8.72 miles (14.03 km) of public roads in Atglen, of which 2.64 miles (4.25 km) were maintained by Pennsylvania Department of Transportation (PennDOT) and 6.08 miles (9.78 km) were maintained by the borough.

Atglen is served by two numbered highways. Pennsylvania Route 41 follows Gap Newport Pike on a northwest-to-southeast alignment across the northeastern portion of the borough. Pennsylvania Route 372 follows Valley Road, Main Street and Lower Valley Road on an east–west alignment through the heart of the borough.

== Demographics ==
Historical population
Census	Pop.	Note	%±
1880	347		—
1890	397		14.4%
1900	404		1.8%
1910	546		35.1%
1920	650		19.0%
1930	620		−4.6%
1940	588		−5.2%
1950	668		13.6%
1960	721		7.9%
1970	740		2.6%
1980	669		−9.6%
1990	825		23.3%
2000	1,217		47.5%
2010	1,406		15.5%
2020	1,313		−6.6%
2021 (est.)	1,306	▼	−0.5%

At the 2010 census, the borough was 85.6% White, 7.4% Black or African American, 0.1% Native American, 0.2% Asian, and 1.5% were two or more races. 5.8% of the population were of Hispanic or Latino ancestry.

As of the 2000 census, there were 1,217 people, 413 households, and 317 families residing in the borough. The population density was 1,377.2 inhabitants per square mile (531.7/km^{2}). There were 429 housing units at an average density of 485.5 per square mile (187.5/km^{2}). The racial makeup of the borough was 88.17% White, 8.38% African American, 0.16% Asian, 2.30% from other races, and 0.99% from two or more races. Hispanic or Latino of any race were 4.93% of the population.

There were 413 households, out of which 46.2% had children under the age of 18 living with them, 55.9% were married couples living together, 16.7% had a female householder with no husband present, and 23.2% were non-families. 17.9% of all households were made up of individuals, and 5.3% had someone living alone who was 65 years of age or older. The average household size was 2.95 and the average family size was 3.33.

The population in Atglen comprised 34.2% under the age of 18, 9.0% from 18 to 24, 32.4% from 25 to 44, 16.6% from 45 to 64, and 7.9% who were 65 years of age or older. The median age was 30 years. For every 100 females there were 94.7 males. For every 100 females age 18 and over, there were 89.8 males.

The median income for a household in the borough was $59,167 according to 2016 Census figures. Males had a median income of $38,553 versus $25,125 for females. The per capita income for the borough was $17,732. About 11.9% of families and 16.8% of the population were below the poverty line, including 27.5% of those under age 18 and 6.1% of those age 65 or over.

== Education ==
The school district is Octorara Area School District.

== Gallery ==
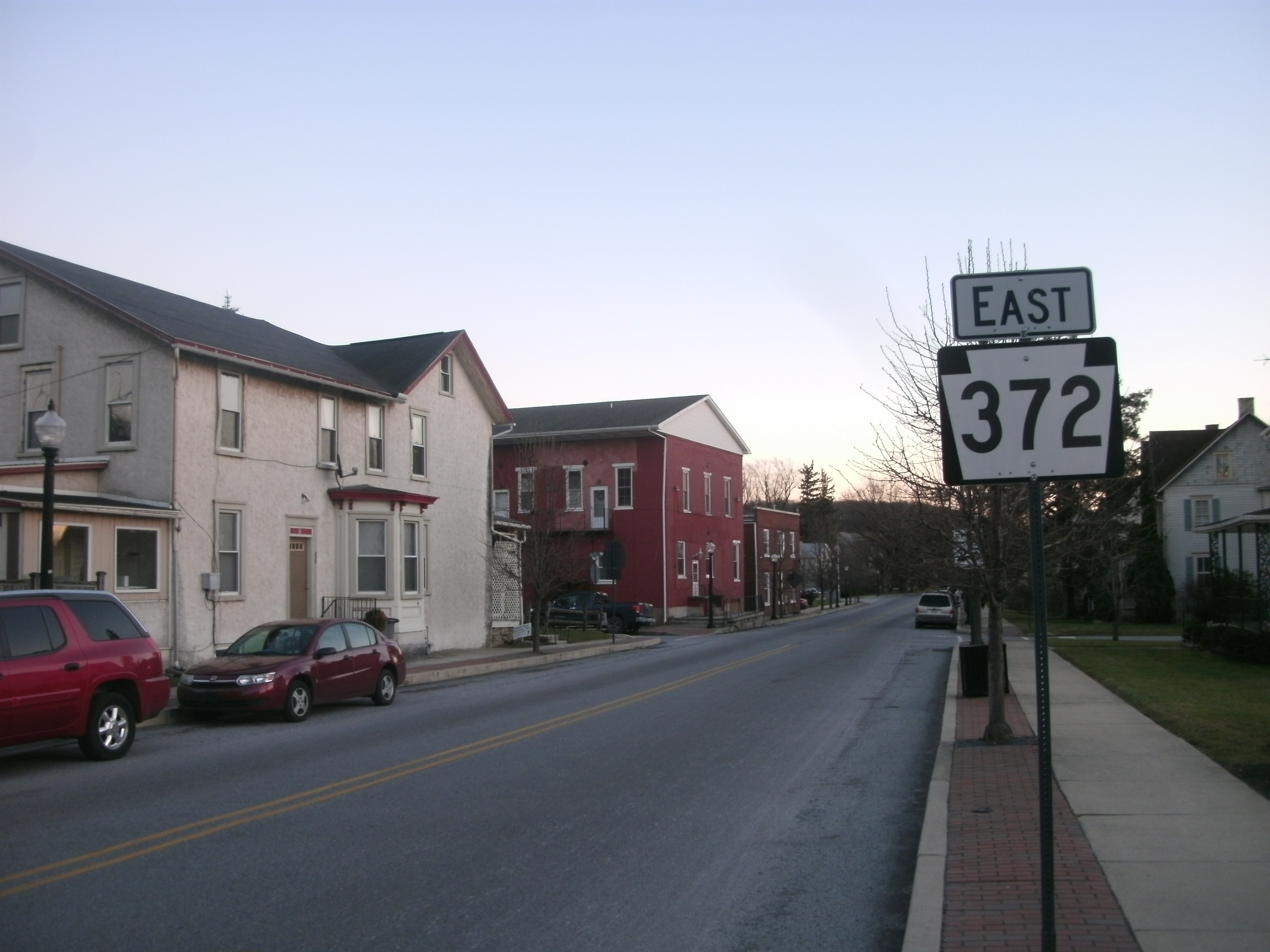
Rt 372

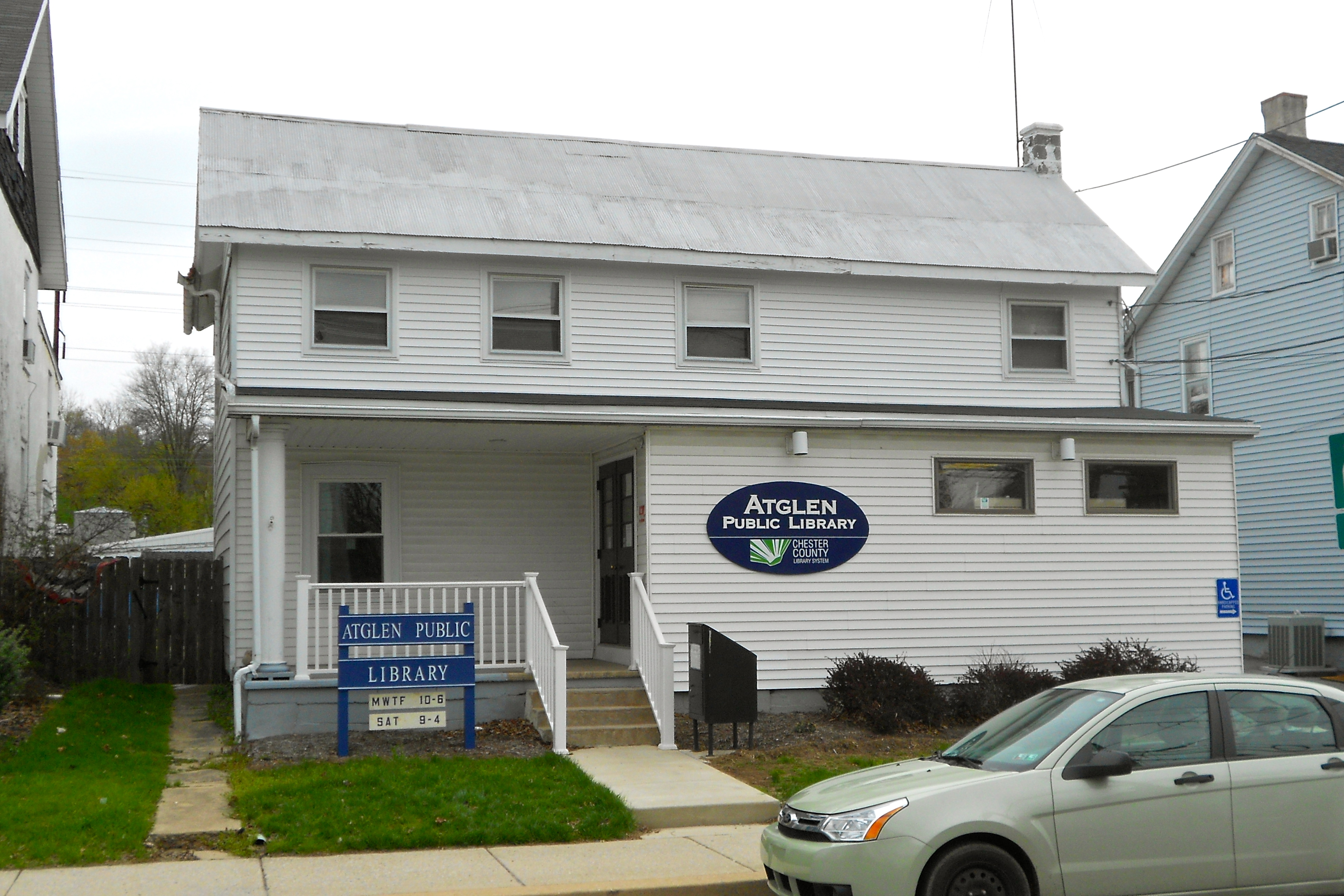
Atglen Library

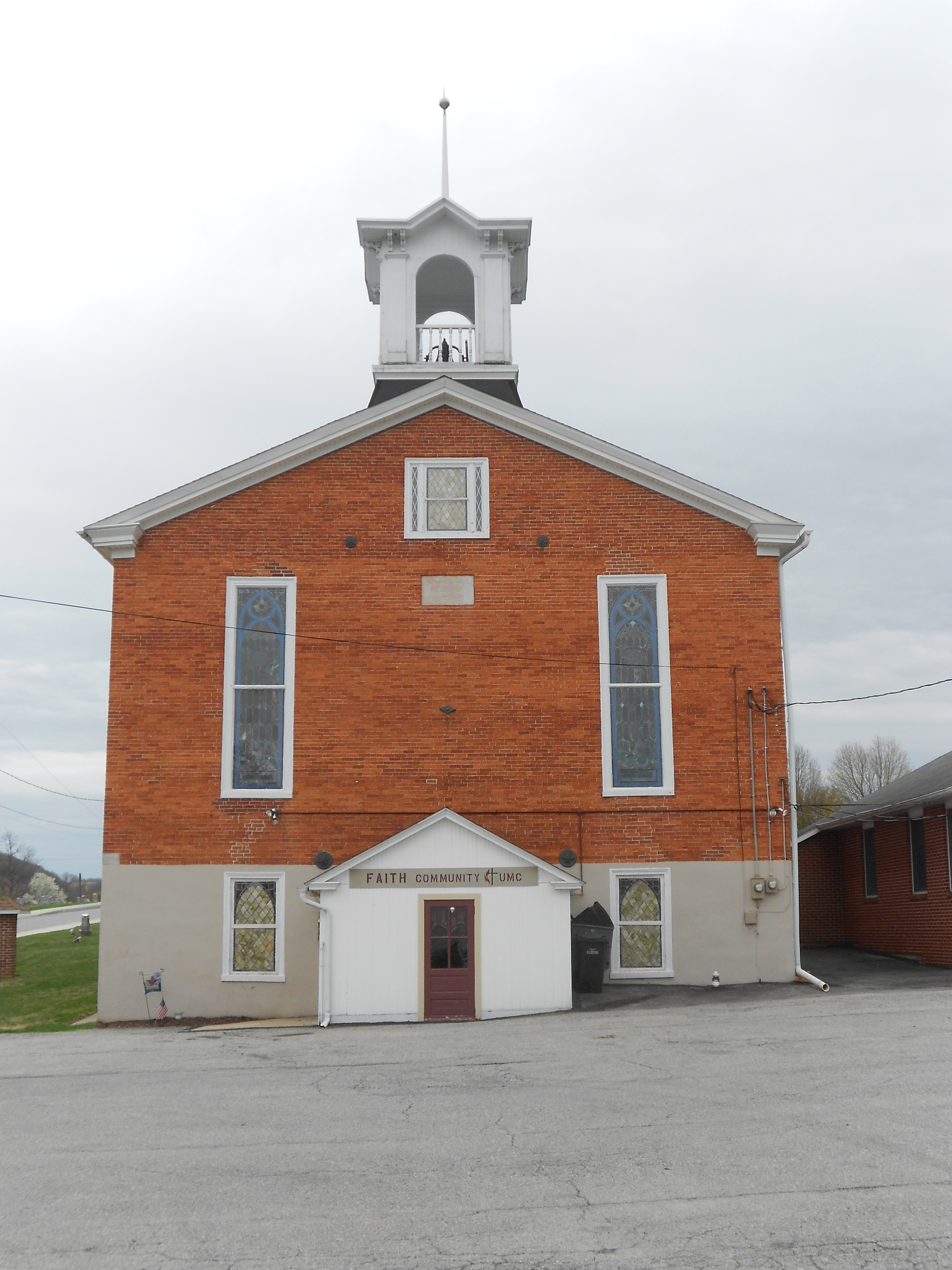
Methodist Episcopal Church

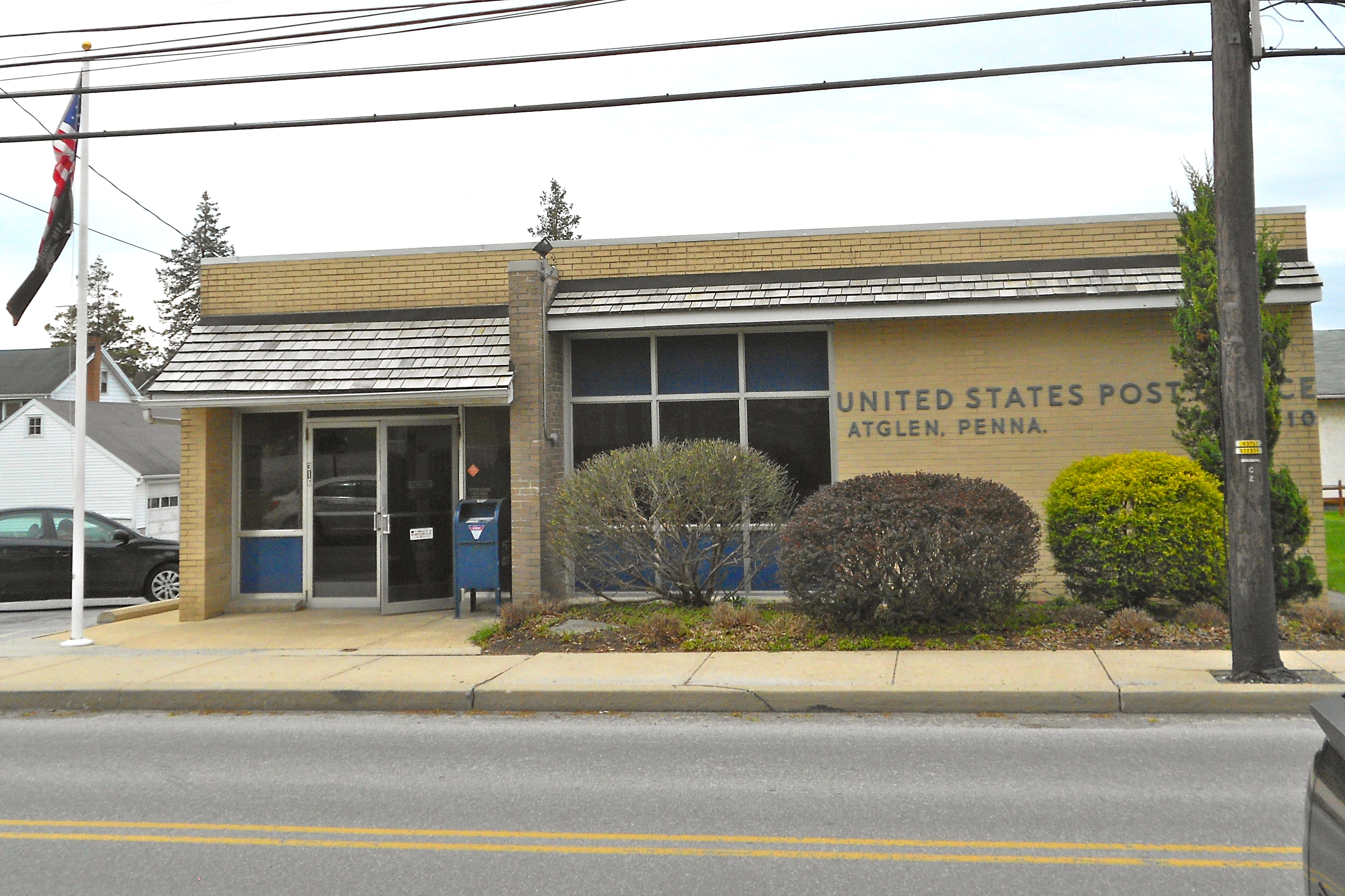
Post Office

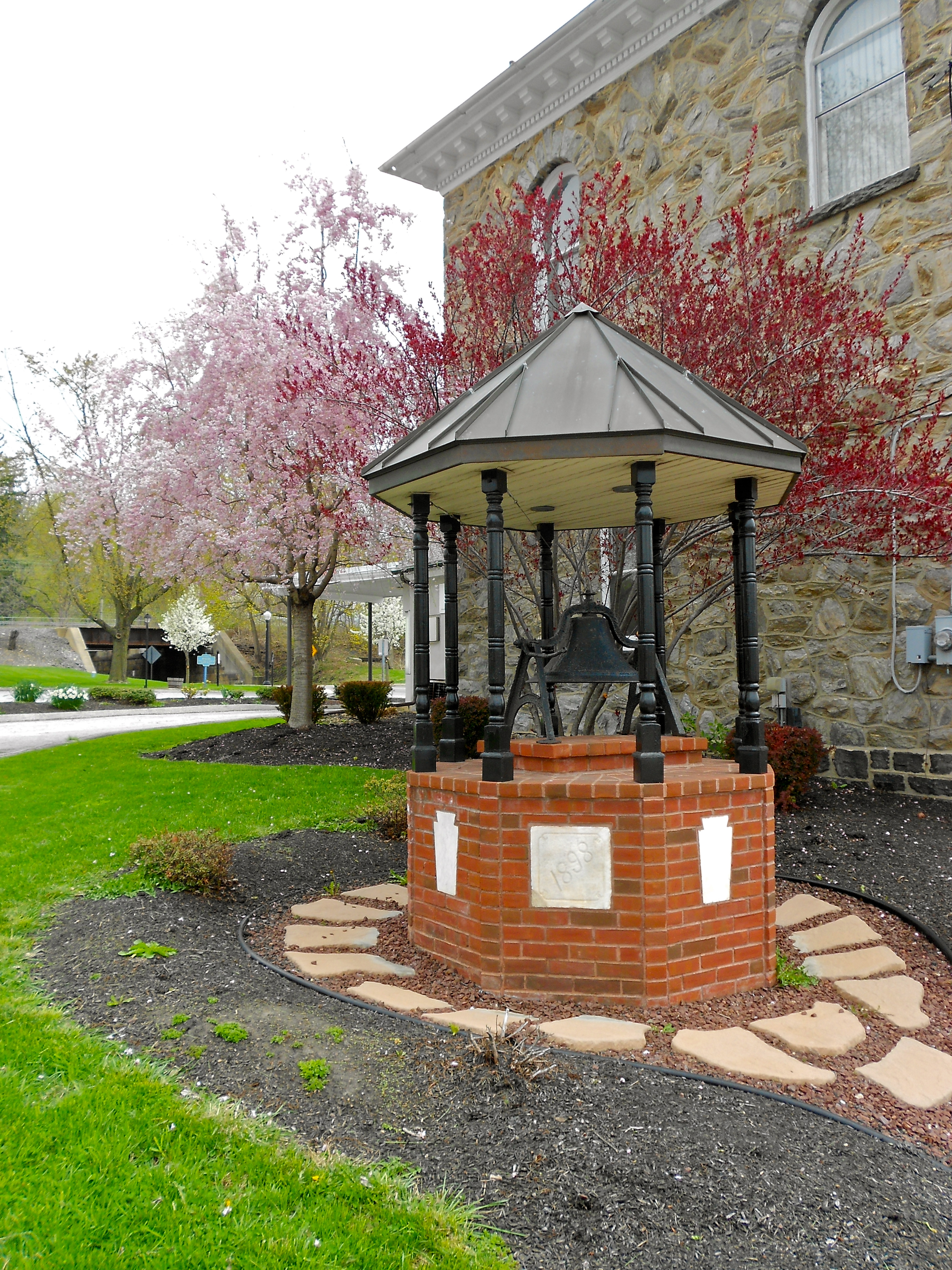
Bell from the original Municipal Building

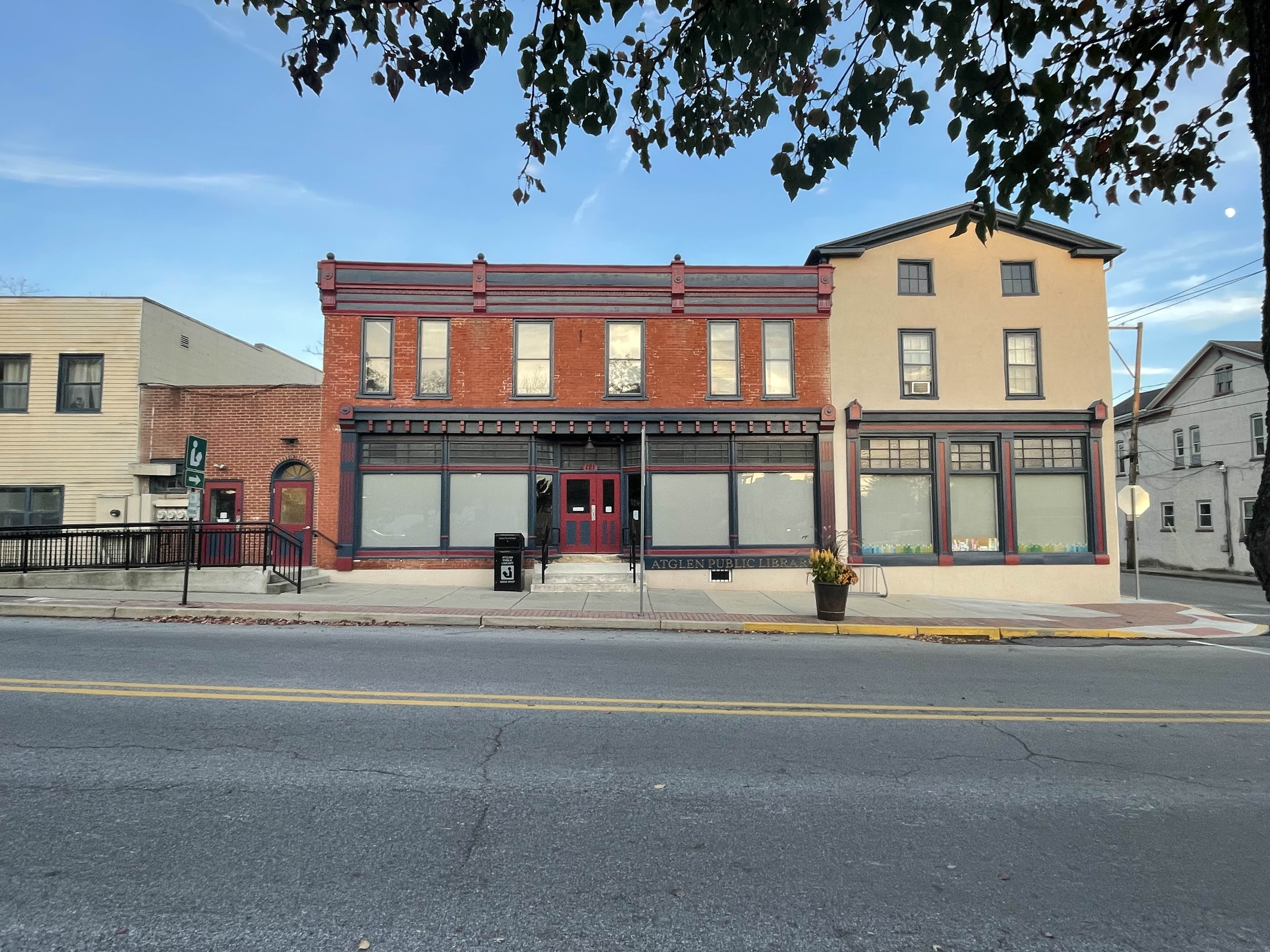
The newer Atglen Library, after the old one was turned into a salon

== Notable people ==
- Thomas J. Philips (1846–1939), member of the Pennsylvania House of Representatives
- John A. Reynolds (1820–1889), member of the Pennsylvania House of Representatives
