= George S. Good =

American Civil War veteran, railroad contractor, and industrialist

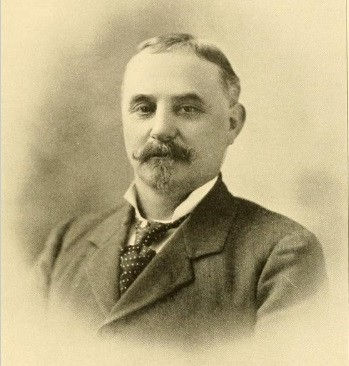
- George S. Good circa 1900
- Born: George Smith Good; April 10, 1844; Turbotville, Pennsylvania, U.S.
- Died: October 14, 1913 (aged 69); Lock Haven, Pennsylvania, U.S.
- Resting place: Highland Cemetery; Lock Haven, Pennsylvania, U.S.
- Education: Dickinson Seminary
- Occupations: Railroad, industrialist
- Title: President, George S. Good & Co President, George S. Good Firebrick Co. President, Patton Clay Manufacturing Co.
- Spouse: Catherine Angelica Baker Good (m. 1867)
- Children: 9

Signature
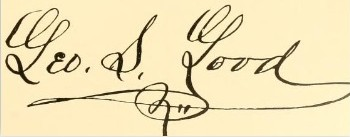

George Smith Good (April 10, 1844 – October 14, 1913) was a Union Army officer during the United States Civil War who later became a significant railroad contractor and industrialist in the firebrick electrical, and clay industries in late 19th and early 20th century America. Good was also one of the founders of the town of Patton, Pennsylvania, along with James Kerr and Senator John Patton.

== Early life and education ==
George Smith Good was born April 10, 1844, in Turbotville, Pennsylvania, as the youngest son of nine children born to George Good and Mary Smith Good. He received a common school education and enrolled in Dickinson Seminary where his education was interrupted by the American Civil War.

== Career ==
=== Military service ===
Good served in Company I, 84th Pennsylvania Regiment during the civil war achieving the rank of 1st lieutenant. He participated in the battles of Fredericksburg, Chancellorsville & Mile Run. At the battle of Chancellorsville, he received a gunshot wound in the right hand, and was taken prisoner and confined to Libby prison for three weeks. In 1863 he was taken prisoner again at the battle of Mine Run and was one of the prisoners who escaped during the Libby Prison escape.

Good was released from military service on December 31, 1864 when he relocated to Lock Haven, Pennsylvania and entered the grocery business in Williamsport, Pennsylvania.

=== Railroads ===
Through his companies Good Construction Company and Pennsylvania Construction Company, Good was a contractor on the following railroads:

- Allegheny Railroad
- Arizona and New Mexico Railway
- Beech Creek Railroad
- Buffalo and Rochester Railroad
- Chihuahua-Pacific Railway
- Choctaw, Oklahoma and Gulf Railroad
- Clearfield and Mahoning Railway
- Coudersport and Port Allegany Railroad
- Denver, Northwestern and Pacific (DN&P) Railway
- Frisco Railroad
- El Paso and Northeastern Railroad
- El Paso and Southwestern Railroad
- New York Central Railroad
- Pennsylvania Railroad
- Toronto, Hamilton and Buffalo Railway among others

=== Business and industry ===
By the early 1890s, Good had expanded his business activities into large city sewer installations, banking, as well as the manufacture of sewer pipe, fire brick and coal mining. Good entered into the clay industry with the founding of the Patton Clay Manufacturing Company.

Good also founded and served as president of the following companies:

- George S. Good Fire Brick Company
- Clearfield Sewer Pipe Company
- The Good Clay & Coal Company
- Margaret Smokeless Coal Company

== Personal life ==
=== Marriage ===
In 1867, Good married Catherine Angelica Baker of Milton, Pennsylvania and together they had 9 children: Sarah Baker "Sally" Good Church, Mary Worth Good, Georgeanna "Georgie" Good, Catherine A "Katie" Good, Edward M. Good, Blanche Beatrice Good Lark, Henry F. Good, Ralph E. Good, and George S. Good II.

== Death ==
Good died peacefully at his home in Lock Haven, Pennsylvania, on October 14, 1913.
