= Plummer E. Jefferis =

American politician (1851–1925)

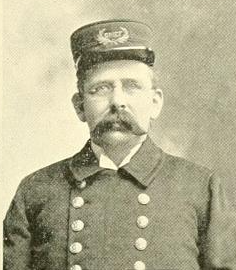
- Jefferis in 1899

Member of the Pennsylvania House of Representatives from the Chester County district
- In office 1897–1900 Serving with John H. Marshall, Thomas J. Philips, Daniel Foulke Moore
- Preceded by: D. Smith Talbot, John H. Marshall, Thomas J. Philips, Daniel Foulke Moore

Personal details
- Born: December 27, 1851 Brandywine Hundred, New Castle County, Delaware, U.S.
- Died: June 6, 1925 (aged 73) West Chester, Pennsylvania, U.S.
- Resting place: Oaklands Cemetery; West Chester, Pennsylvania, U.S.
- Party: Republican; Fusion Party
- Occupation: Politician; farmer; contractor; plumber

Plummer E. Jefferis (December 27, 1851 – June 6, 1925) was an American politician from Pennsylvania. He served as a member of the Pennsylvania House of Representatives, representing Chester County from 1897 to 1900.

== Early life ==
Plummer E. Jefferis was born on December 27, 1851, in Brandywine Hundred, New Castle County, Delaware. He went to school in Green Valley.

== Career ==
Jefferis was a farmer, plumber, carpenter, contractor and builder. He built the school building on South High Street, Friends' School in North Ward, the Episcopal Tower, West Chester Ice Plant and houses in West Chester, Pennsylvania. He also built homes in Philadelphia. He supervised the construction of the Williamson Free School of Mechanical Trades near Elwyn, Pennsylvania. He was trustee of the West Chester Building and Loan Association. He became treasurer of the Penn Mutual Fire Insurance Company in 1891. He was a member of the board of trustees of Dime Savings Bank of Chester County. He was director of the West Chester Board of Trade. He was fire marshal of West Chester, Pennsylvania, from 1895 to 1900.

Jefferis was a Republican. He was elected as a Republican to the Pennsylvania House of Representatives, representing Chester County in 1896. He was re-elected as a member of the Fusion Party in 1898. He served from 1897 to 1900.

Jefferis was appointed appraiser of Pennsylvania in 1904. He was elected burgess of West Chester.

== Personal life ==
Jefferis died on June 6, 1925, in West Chester. He was interred in Oaklands Cemetery in West Chester.
