= Patton Clay Manufacturing Company =

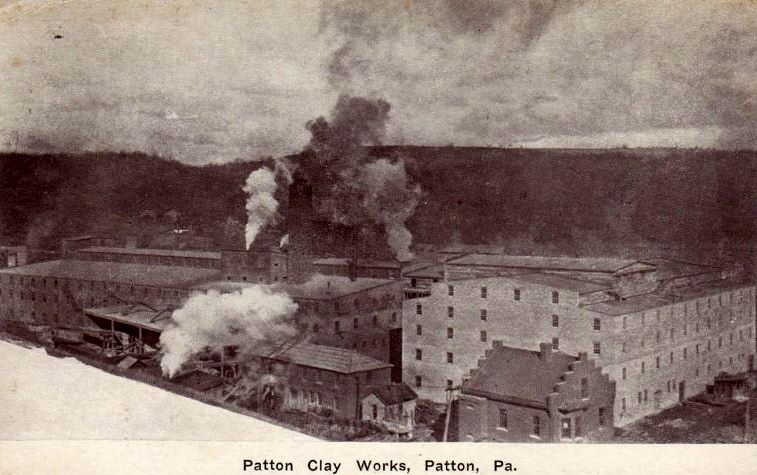
- Patton Clay Manufacturing Company Factory, circa 1909
- Industry: Clay products manufacturing
- Founded: 1895
- Defunct: 1968
- Headquarters: Patton, Pennsylvania, United States
- Key people: George S. Good, James Kerr, Alexander Patton
- Products: Sewer pipes, tiles, bricks, paving materials

The Patton Clay Manufacturing Company was a producer of clay-based products operating in Patton, Pennsylvania, from its incorporation in 1895 until its closure in 1968. Founded by George S. Good, James Kerr, and Alexander Ennis Patton, the company became one of the world's largest manufacturers of clay products, including sewer pipes, tiles, and bricks. Patton Pavers were used globally, contributing to projects such as the construction of the Panama Canal and the paving around the Eiffel Tower.

== History ==
The company's establishment was influenced by the availability of essential resources in the region, such as accessible clay and coal deposits, as well as excellent rail linkages and an ample labor supply. The manufacturing plant spanned approximately 40 acres and was a significant contributor to the local economy, providing employment to over 600 miners and other workers at its peak.

== Closure and legacy ==
After ceasing operations in 1968, the original site of the Patton Clay Manufacturing Company underwent redevelopment. The area now hosts the Patton Plaza, The Meadows Housing Development, and Brickwood Estates. A memorial kiln has been erected on the grounds of The Meadows Housing Development to commemorate the company's historical significance.

Efforts to preserve the legacy of the Patton Clay Manufacturing Company continue. In 2008, a memorial was established at the former factory site by the Patton Pavers group. As of 2024, local residents have initiated efforts to reform the group, aiming to maintain and restore the memorial, as well as to promote community engagement and historical preservation.
