= South Coatesville, Pennsylvania =

Borough in Pennsylvania, US

- Borough
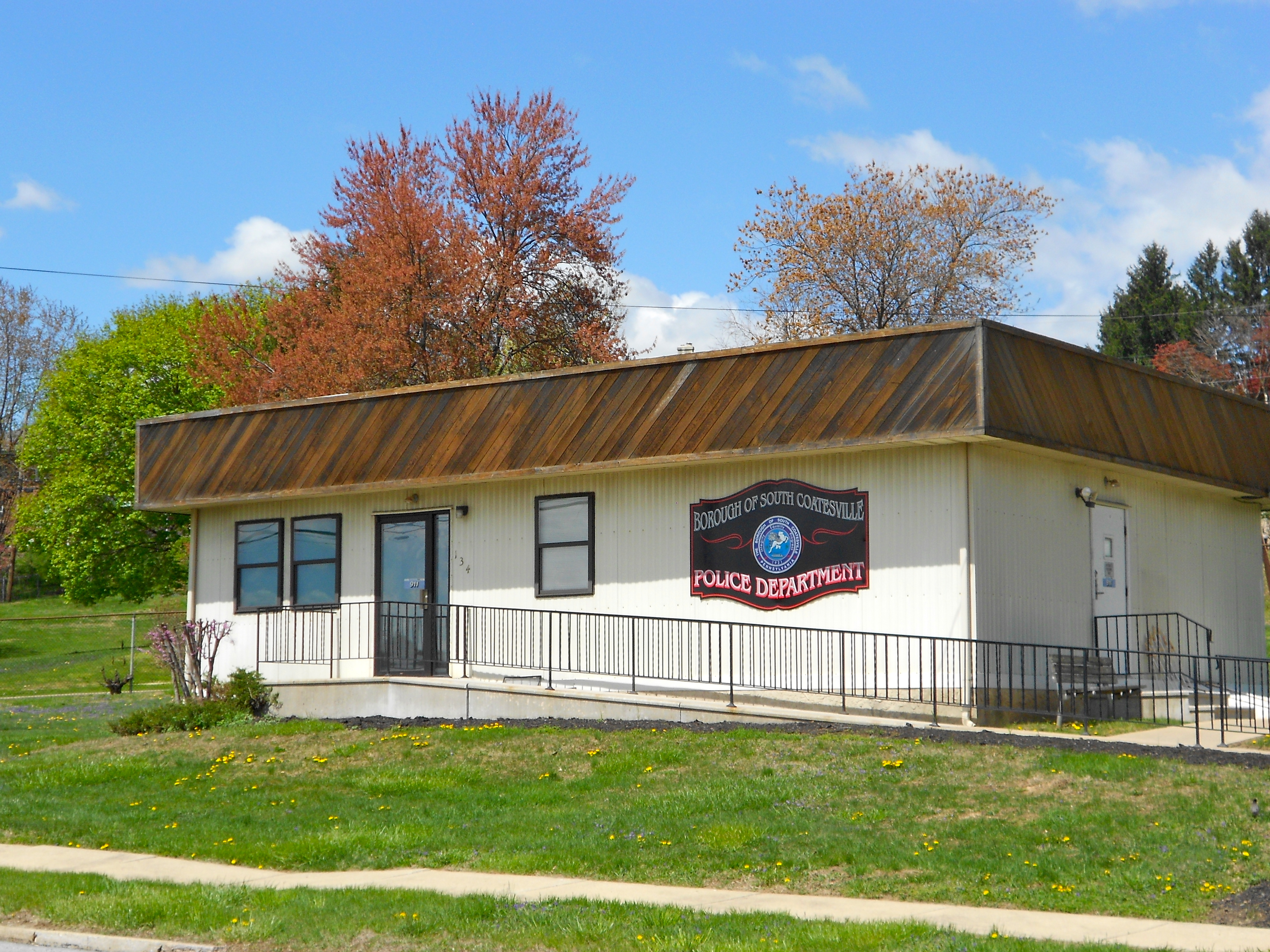
- Police headquarters

- Location in Chester County and the U.S. state of Pennsylvania

- Location in Pennsylvania Location in the United States
- Coordinates: 39°58′17″N 75°48′43″W
- Country: United States
- State: Pennsylvania
- County: Chester

Area
  - Total: 1.76 sq mi (4.57 km^{2})
  - Land: 1.74 sq mi (4.50 km^{2})
  - Water: 0.027 sq mi (0.07 km^{2})
- Elevation: 397 ft (121 m)

Population (2020)
  - Total: 1,604 ▲
  - Estimate (2021): 1,650
  - Density: 838.8/sq mi (323.85/km^{2})
- Time zone: UTC-5 (EST)
  - Summer (DST): UTC-4 (EDT)
- ZIP code: 19320
- Area codes: 610 and 484
- FIPS code: 42-72072
- Website: south-coatesville.org

South Coatesville is a borough that is located in Chester County, Pennsylvania, United States. The population was 1,604 at the time of the 2020 census.

== Geography ==
South Coatesville is located at 39°58′17″N 75°48′43″W (39.971306, -75.812023).

According to the United States Census Bureau, the borough has a total area of 1.7 square miles (4.4 km^{2}), all land.

== Demographics ==
Historical population
Census	Pop.	Note	%±
1930	1,785		—
1940	1,604		−10.1%
1950	1,996		24.4%
1960	2,032		1.8%
1970	1,583		−22.1%
1980	1,359		−14.2%
1990	1,026		−24.5%
2000	997		−2.8%
2010	1,303		30.7%
2020	1,601		22.9%
2021 (est.)	1,650	▲	3.1%

=== 2020 census ===
South Coatesville, Pennsylvania – Racial and ethnic composition Note: the US Census treats Hispanic/Latino as an ethnic category. This table excludes Latinos from the racial categories and assigns them to a separate category. Hispanics/Latinos may be of any race.
Race / Ethnicity (NH = Non-Hispanic)	Pop 2000	Pop 2010	Pop 2020	% 2000	% 2010	2020
White alone (NH)	324	460	588	32.50%	35.30%	36.73%
Black or African American alone (NH)	554	603	612	55.57%	46.28%	38.23%
Native American or Alaska Native alone (NH)	2	2	1	0.20%	0.15%	0.06%
Asian alone (NH)	0	4	14	0.00%	0.31%	0.87%
Pacific Islander alone (NH)	0	0	1	0.00%	0.00%	0.06%
Other race alone (NH)	4	6	9	0.40%	0.46%	0.56%
Mixed race or Multiracial (NH)	24	58	109	2.41%	4.45%	6.81%
Hispanic or Latino (any race)	89	170	267	8.93%	13.05%	16.68%
Total	997	1,303	1,601	100.00%	100.00%	100.00%

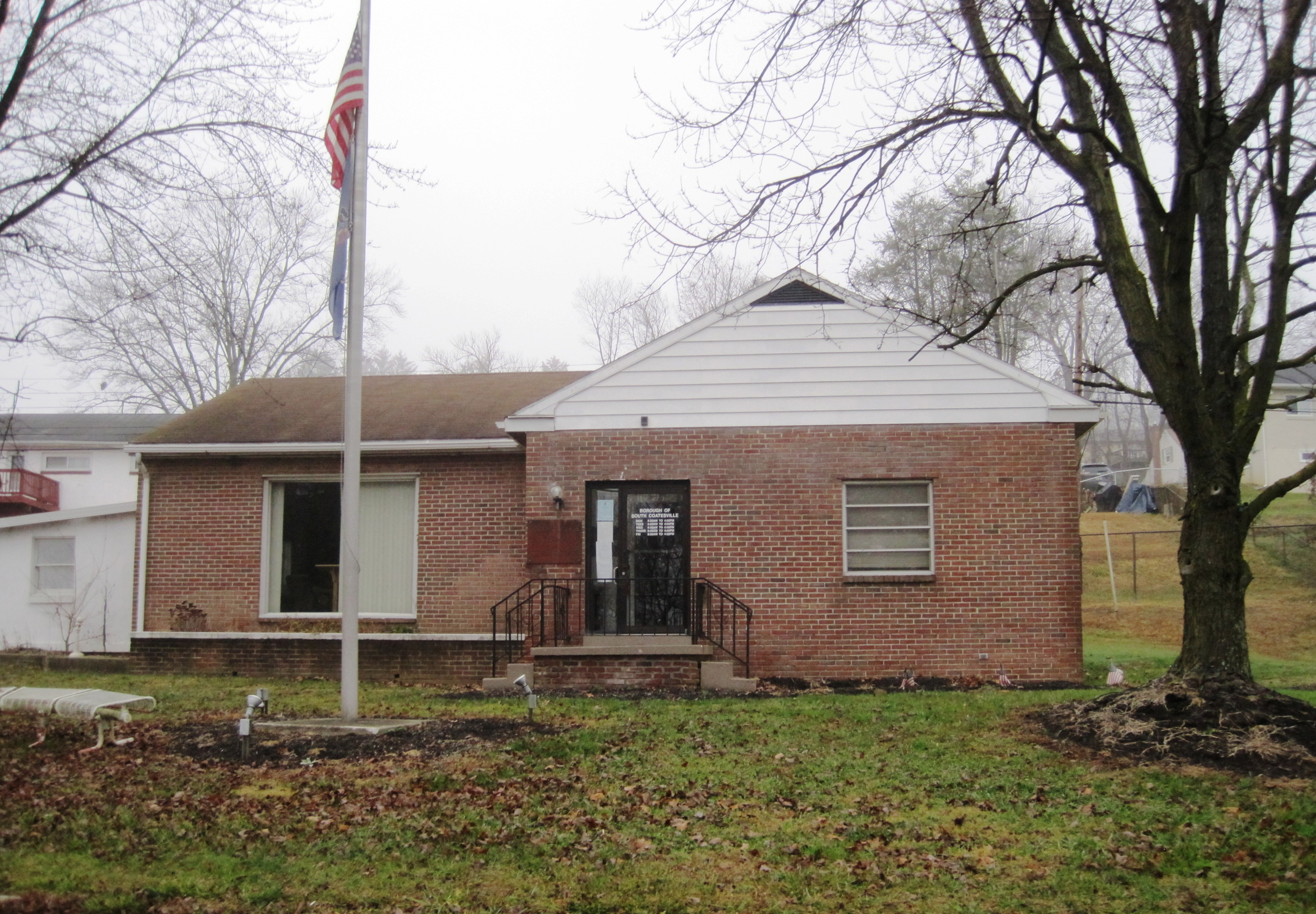
South Coatesville Municipal Building

=== 2010 ===
At the time of the 2010 census, the borough was 35.3% non-Hispanic White, 47.9% Black or African American, 0.2% Native American, 0.3% Asian, and 5.2% were two or more races. 13.0% of the population were of Hispanic or Latino ancestry .

At the time of the 2000 census, there were 997 people, 376 households, and 263 families living in the borough.

The population density was 586.2 inhabitants per square mile (226.3/km^{2}). There were 419 housing units at an average density of 246.3 per square mile (95.1/km^{2}).

The racial makeup of the borough was 34.80% White, 56.07% African American, 0.20% Native American, 0.30% Pacific Islander, 4.11% from other races, and 4.51% from two or more races. Hispanic or Latino of any race were 8.93%.

There were 376 households; 27.1% had children who were under the age of eighteen living with them, 41.0% were married couples living together, 22.1% had a female householder with no husband present, and 29.8% were non-families. 25.8% of households were made up of individuals, and 13.0% were one person aged sixty-five or older.

The average household size was 2.64 and the average family size was 3.13.

The age distribution was 27.7% of residents who were under the age of eighteen, 7.2% who were aged eighteen to twenty-four, 25.3% who were aged twenty-five to forty-four, 22.7% who were aged forty-five to sixty-four, and 17.2% who were aged sixty-five or older. The median age was thirty-eight years.

For every one hundred females, there were 87.1 males. For every 100 females who were aged eighteen or older, there were 83.9 males.

The median household income was $37,596 and the median family income was $41,528. Males had a median income of $31,813 compared with that of $29,028 for females.

The per capita income for the borough was $14,321.

Approximately 11.9% of families and 12.6% of the population were living below the poverty line, including 11.3% of those who were under the age of eighteen and 16.0% of those who were aged sixty-five or older.

== Transportation ==
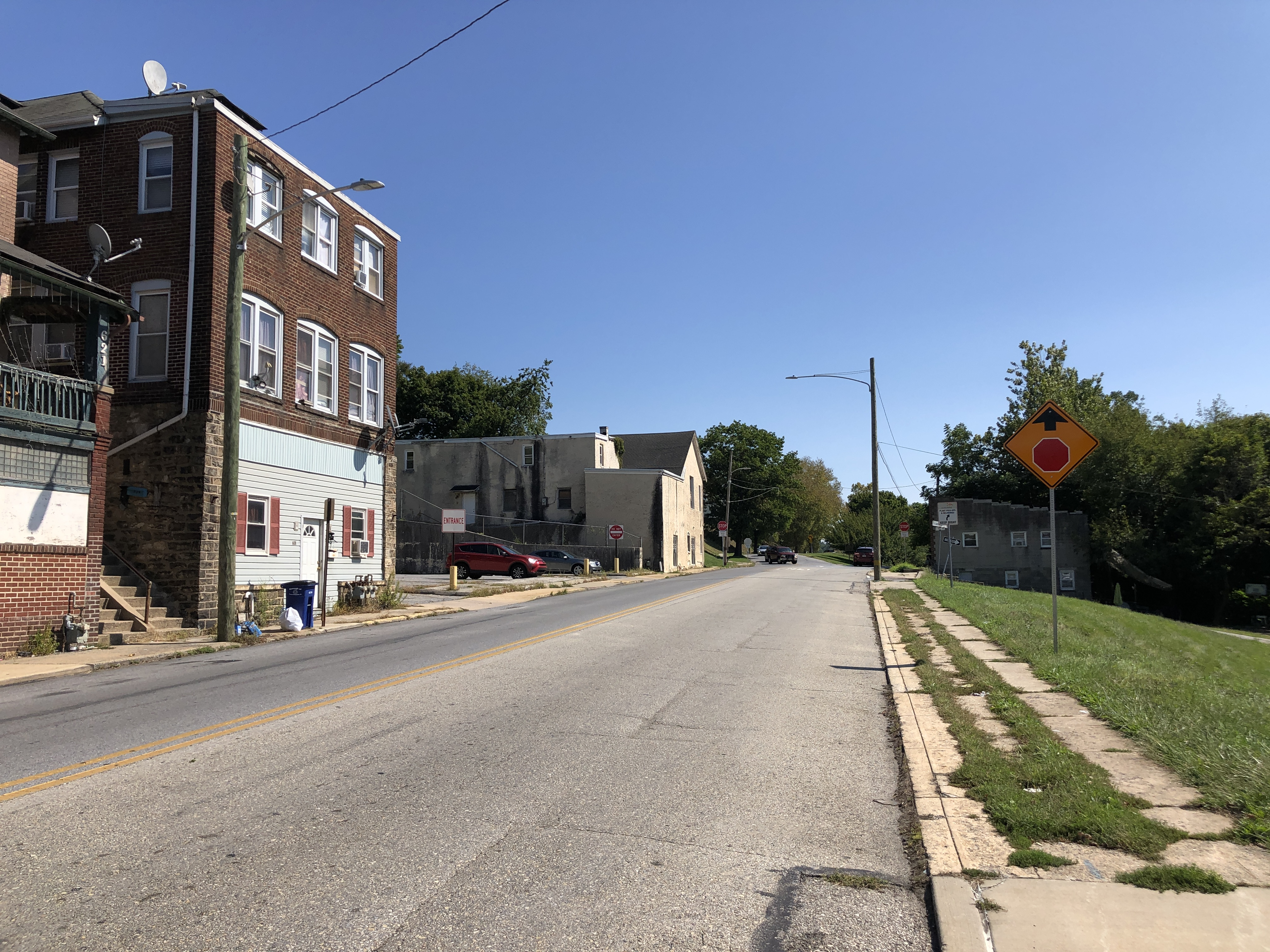
First Avenue in South Coatesville

As of 2011, there were 8.94 miles (14.39 km) of public roads in South Coatesville, of which 2.68 miles (4.31 km) were maintained by Pennsylvania Department of Transportation (PennDOT) and 6.26 miles (10.07 km) were maintained by the borough.

No numbered highways serve South Coatesville directly. Main thoroughfares in the borough include First Avenue, Modena Road and Youngsburg Road.

== Education ==
The school district is Coatesville Area School District.
