= Patton, Pennsylvania =

Borough in Pennsylvania, US

- Borough
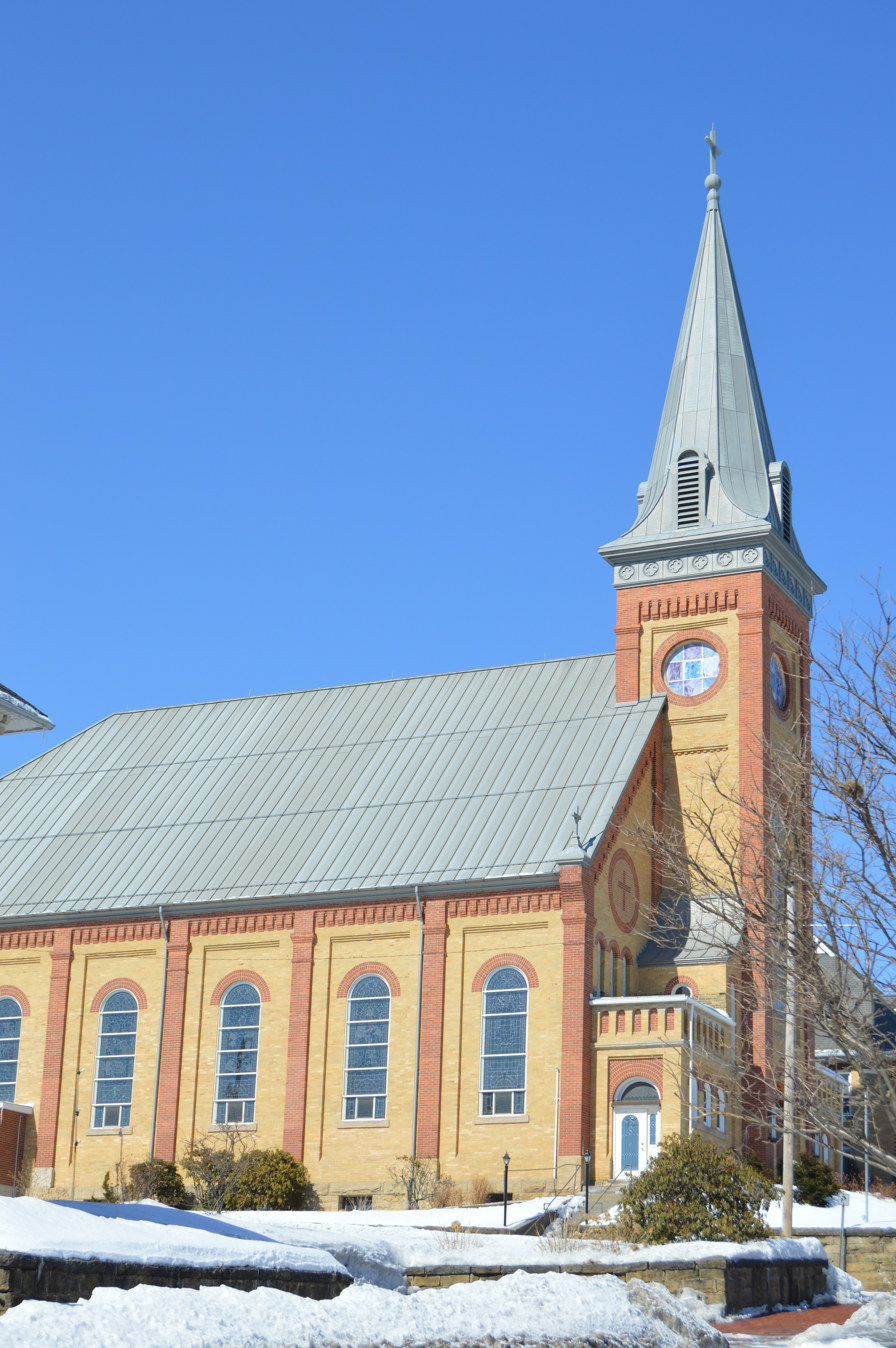
- St. Mary's Catholic Church

- Location of Patton in Cambria County, Pennsylvania.

- Location within Pennsylvania
- Coordinates: 40°38′04″N 78°39′03″W
- Country: United States
- State: Pennsylvania
- County: Cambria
- Settled: 1844
- Incorporated: 1893

Government
  - Type: Borough council

Area
  - Total: 0.89 sq mi (2.31 km^{2})
  - Land: 0.89 sq mi (2.31 km^{2})
  - Water: 0 sq mi (0.00 km^{2})
- Elevation: 1,736 ft (529 m)

Population (2020)
  - Total: 1,728
  - Density: 1,939.3/sq mi (748.77/km^{2})
- Time zone: UTC-5 (Eastern (EST))
  - Summer (DST): UTC-4 (EDT)
- ZIP code: 16668
- Area code: 814
- FIPS code: 42-58432
- GNIS feature ID: 1215031
- Website: www.pattonboro.com

Patton is a borough in Cambria County, Pennsylvania, United States. It is 19 miles (31 km) northwest of Altoona, in an agricultural region. It is part of the Johnstown, Pennsylvania Metropolitan Statistical Area. The population was 1,728 at the 2020 census.

== History ==
Patton's economy was formerly centered around the Patton Clay Manufacturing Company. The factory was one of the largest clay and brick concerns in the world in the first half of the 1900s. The company manufactured terra cotta products (pipe and tiles), building bricks, and pavers (known as "Patton Pavers") from 1893 until it closed in 1968. Bricks made there were used in the construction of the Panama Canal, and the pavers were used around the Eiffel Tower in France. The products were made from clay excavated from the area.

Due to the closure of the Clay Works, Patton's economy and population declined.

The Patton Historic District was listed on the National Register of Historic Places in 1996.

== Geography ==
Patton is located in northern Cambria County at 40°38′4″N 78°39′3″W (40.634466, -78.650812), in the valley of Chest Creek, a northward-flowing tributary of the West Branch of the Susquehanna River. Ebensburg, the county seat, is 13 miles (21 km) to the south.

According to the United States Census Bureau, the borough of Patton has a total area of 0.89 square miles (2.3 km^{2}), all land.

== Demographics ==
Historical population
Census	Pop.	Note	%±
1900	2,651		—
1910	3,907		47.4%
1920	3,628		−7.1%
1930	2,988		−17.6%
1940	3,085		3.2%
1950	3,148		2.0%
1960	2,880		−8.5%
1970	2,762		−4.1%
1980	2,441		−11.6%
1990	2,206		−9.6%
2000	2,023		−8.3%
2010	1,769		−12.6%
2020	1,728		−2.3%

As of the census of 2000, there were 2,023 people, 886 households, and 539 families residing in the borough. The population density was 2,033.3 people per square mile (785.1 people/km^{2}). There were 980 housing units at an average density of 985.0 per square mile (380.3/km^{2}). The racial makeup of the borough was 99.80% White, 0.05% Native American, and 0.15% from two or more races. Hispanic or Latino of any race were 0.05% of the population.

There were 886 households, out of which 24.9% had children under the age of 18 living with them, 46.8% were married couples living together, 9.7% had a female householder with no husband present, and 39.1% were non-families. 36.0% of all households were made up of individuals, and 19.3% had someone living alone who was 65 years of age or older. The average household size was 2.28 and the average family size was 3.00.

In the borough the population was spread out, with 22.9% under the age of 18, 7.1% from 18 to 24, 26.6% from 25 to 44, 22.6% from 45 to 64, and 20.9% who were 65 years of age or older. The median age was 41 years. For every 100 females there were 86.1 males. For every 100 females age 18 and over, there were 85.9 males.

The median income for a household in the borough was $22,546, and the median income for a family was $35,473. Males had a median income of $26,940 versus $16,875 for females. The per capita income for the borough was $13,851. About 11.5% of families and 14.2% of the population were below the poverty line, including 11.0% of those under age 18 and 12.0% of those age 65 or over.

== Notable people ==
- George Engle Prindible - Industrialist, Banker and Philanthropist was the General Manager of the Patton Clay Manufacturing Company for 40 years as well as the Patton Borough Burgess, Councilman and Council President for 40 years.
- George Smith Good - Union Officer, Industrialist was one of the founders of Patton.
- Rembert Weakland of the Roman Catholic Archdiocese of Milwaukee was born in Patton.
