= Van Leer (surname) =

Van Leer is a surname of Dutch and German origin. It is a variant of the ancient surname Valär. Notable people with this surname include:

- Florence Van Leer Earle Coates (1850–1927), American poet, women's rights advocate
- Antoinette Van Leer Polk (1847–1919), American Southern belle and Baroness de Charette
- Maryly Van Leer Peck (1930–2011), American academic and president of Polk Community College, Winter Haven, Florida
- Carlos Clark Van Leer (1865–1953), military officer
- Anthony Wayne Van Leer (1783–1864), iron works owner in Tennessee
- Benjamin van Leer (born 1992), Dutch footballer
- Bernardhus Van Leer (1687–1790), was one of the first doctors in New York
- Blake Ragsdale Van Leer (1893–1956), president of Georgia Institute of Technology
- Blake Wayne Van Leer (1926–1997), Captain and Commander in the U.S. Navy.
- Bram van Leer (fl. 1970–2012), Dutch-American professor emeritus of aerospace engineering at the University of Michigan
- Carlos Clark Van Leer (1865–1953), Captain in the U.S. Army and Chief of Personnel in U.S. Department of Treasury
- David Van Leer (1949–2013), American educator, author and cultural studies researcher
- Ella Lillian Wall Van Leer (1892–1986), American artist, architect and women's rights activist
- Isaac Van Leer (1772–1821), iron works owner in Pennsylvania
- Jean Van Leer (1919–2003), Belgian field hockey player
- John P. Van Leer (1825–1862), American military officer
- Lia van Leer (1924–2015), film archive pioneer in Israel
- Samuel Van Leer (1747–1825), ironmaster and captain in the American Revolutionary War
- Thijs van Leer (born 1948), Dutch musician

== Given name ==
- VanLeer Polk (1856–1907), Tennessee State Senator and diplomat

== See also ==
- Van Leer (disambiguation)
- Van Lear (disambiguation)
- Van Leer Family
