= Van Leer =

Van Leer may refer to:

== Places in the United States ==
- VanLeer, Tennessee, an old iron works town named after Anthony Van Leer
- Van Leer Cabin, an 18th-century cabin in Chester County, Pennsylvania
- Van Leer House, an 18th-century house in Delaware County, Pennsylvania
- Van Leer Pleasant Hill Plantation, an 18th-century stone farmhouse near Glen Moore, Pennsylvania
- Van Leer Building, a building on the main campus of the Georgia Institute of Technology
- Broadview VanLeer Mansion, a 1906 mansion in McLean County, Illinois
- Mortonson-Van Leer Log Cabin, historic cabin in Swedesboro, Cumberland County, New Jersey

== Other uses ==
- Van Leer (surname)
- Bernard Van Leer Foundation, a Dutch organization that promotes work in early childhood development and children's rights
  - Van Leer Jerusalem Institute, established in 1959
- Van Leer Packaging, a packaging company which was acquired by Huhtamäki in 1999
- Van Leer Factory, a listed building in Dundee, Scotland

== See also ==
- Van Lear (disambiguation)
