= John P. Van Leer =

American military officer (1825-1862)

- Born: John Pugh Van Leer; February 27, 1825
- Died: May 5, 1862 (aged 37); Williamsburg, Virginia, U.S.
- Burial place: Mount Vernon Cemetery, Philadelphia, Pennsylvania, U.S.
- Military career
- Allegiance: United States of America
- Branch: Union Army
- Service years: 1860-1862
- Rank: Colonel; Lieutenant Colonel
- Commands: 6th New Jersey Volunteer Infantry
- Conflicts: American Civil War: First Battle of Bull Run; Peninsula campaign; Battle of Williamsburg (KIA)

John Pugh Van Leer (February 27, 1825 – May 5, 1862) was an American military officer who served in the Union Army during the American Civil War. He commanded the 6th New Jersey Volunteer Infantry regiment and was killed during the Battle of Williamsburg. He was a member of the influential Van Leer family and his ancestors were some the earliest settlers of the Pennsylvania Colony.

== Civil War ==
At the outbreak of the Civil War Van Leer joined the Union Army at Gloucester City, New Jersey with his family, and was commissioned as a Captain, promoted to Major and Lieutenant colonel of the 6th New Jersey Volunteer Infantry in 1861. He served under Brigadier General Francis E. Patterson and Joseph Hooker. Van Leer's regiment was the first fully equipped brigade to arrive in Washington, D.C. just before the First Battle of Bull Run. After his regiment built Fort Runyon, Van Leer lead 10 companies during Hooker's Virginia campaigns. He was killed during the Battle of Williamsburg on May 5, 1862 and interred at Mount Vernon Cemetery in Philadelphia. Before being killed in battle, his commission as a Colonel was on its way to him. His colonelcy would later be officially honored after his death.

== Family ==
His great-grandfather Bernardhus Van Leer was an early settler of the Pennsylvania Colony. John's grandfather Isaac Van Leer fought in the American Revolutionary War along with his brother Samuel Van Leer. The Van Leer family were known for their success in the iron business and several historical locations in Pennsylvania are associated with the family including the Van Leer Cabin and the Van Leer Pleasant Hill Plantation.

== Legacy ==
The Van Leer Post, No. 36 of the Grand Army of the Republic in Gloucester City, New Jersey, was named in his honor.

Van Leer built and leased houses for free black tradesmen and to people who were supportive of the free black community in Lima, Pennsylvania at a location now known as Van Leer Avenue.

== Sources ==
- Hastings, Earl C. and Hastings, David S. (1997). A Pitiless Rain: The Battle of Williamsburg, 1862. White Mane Publishing Company. ISBN 9781572490420.
- Prowell, George Reeser (1886). The History of Camden County, New Jersey. L.J. Richards & Co.
