= Van Leer family =

Van Leer
- Earlier spellings: Valär, Von Löhr, Von Leer
- Etymology: German and Romansh for "from Valär" a castle in Grisons or later "from Lohr"
- Origin: Rhaeto-Romans, Canton of the Grisons, German American Community, United States (Pennsylvania)
- Connected families: Earle Family; Muhlenberg family
- Estates: Boardview Mansion; Van Leer Pleasant Hill; Windsor Forge Mansion; Reading Mansion

The Van Leer family, originally spelled Von Lohr, is an influential German–American family that emigrated to the Province of Pennsylvania in the 17th century from the Electorate of Hesse near Isenberg, Germany.

The family made their fortune in the United States through the ironworks business. The family includes American business owners, academics, civil rights activists, women's rights activists, university founders, inventors, politicians, and military officers. Earlier spellings include Von Leer, Von Lohr, and the ancient surname Valär.

== History ==
The family is first mentioned in 1396 and their coat of arms was registered at the Battle of Grandson in 1476. They later held prominent positions within the Saffran Guild in Zürich before moving to Hesse and Mainz. They maintained close relations with the House of Matsch during the end of the 15th century Johann Georg von Lohr sometimes as "von Leer" founded the America branch in 1682 as one of William Penn's first investors. He was the first to use the spelling Van Leer.

== Notable family members ==
- Bernardhus Van Leer (1687–1790), physician and early settler of the Province of Pennsylvania
- Samuel Van Leer (1747–1825), a captain in the American Revolutionary War
- Isaac Van Leer (1772–1821), ironworks owner
- Carlos Clark Van Leer (1865–1953), military officer
- Anthony Wayne Van Leer (1783–1864), ironworks owner
- John P. Van Leer (1825–1862), a colonel in the Union Army during the American Civil War
- Antoinette Van Leer Polk (1847–1919), Baroness de Charette
- Florence Van Leer Earle Coates (1850–1927), poet
- George Howard Earle Jr. (1856–1928), lawyer and businessman
- George Howard Earle III (1890–1974), Governor of Pennsylvania and diplomat
- Ralph Earle (1928–2020), Ambassador and arms control negotiator
- VanLeer Polk (1858–1907), Tennessee state senator
- Carlos Clark Van Leer (1865–1953), United States Army Officer and Chief at the United States Department of the Treasury
- Blake Ragsdale Van Leer (1893–1956), president of Georgia Institute of Technology
- Blake Wayne Van Leer (1926–1997), U.S. Navy officer
- Maryly Van Leer Peck (1930–2011), academician and college administrator
- David Van Leer (1949–2013), academician and LGBT cultural studies researcher

== Historical properties ==
- Barnardus Van Leer House
- Broadview VanLeer Mansion
- Hibernia House
- Mortonson-Van Leer Log Cabin
- Reading Furnace Historic District
- Van Leer Cabin
- Van Leer Pleasant Hill Plantation
- Van Leer Building
- Windsor Forge Mansion

== Family tree ==
John George Von Lohr | Mary Von Lohr
Mary Branson (1733–1749) | Bernardhus Van Leer (1687–1790) | Christina Fuls (1750–1790)
Hannah Wayne | Samuel Van Leer (1747–1825) | George Van Leer (1735-1807) | Thomas Van Leer (died 1754) | Branson Van Leer (died 1798) | William Van Leer (1743-1764) | Benjamin Van Leer (1746–1820)
Isaac Van Leer (1754–1799) | Mary Van Leer (died 1783) | Hannah Van Leer (1761–1837) | Catherine Van Leer (1764–1828) | Christian Van Leer | Child (died young) | Bernard Van Leer II (1770–1814) | Child (died young) | Child (died young)
Betsy Van Leer (born 1771) | Isaac Van Leer (1772–1821) | Elizabeth Culbertson | William Van Leer (born 1775) | Bernard Van Leer (born 1777) | Polly Van Leer (born 1780 | Anthony Wayne Van Leer (1783–1864) | Rebecca Brady | Ann Van Leer (born 1786) | Hannah Van Leer (born 1786)
Wayne Van Leer (born 1810) | Linford Van Leer (born 1806) | Margaret Van Leer (born 1805) | Hannah Van Leer (born 1804) | Eleanora Chambers Van Leer (1821–1849) | Rebecca Van Leer (1826–1904) | Andrew Jackson Polk
Maurice Langhorne Van Leer (1865–1897) | Antoinette Van Leer Polk (1847–1919) | VanLeer Polk (1858–1907)
Blake Ragsdale Van Leer (1893–1956) | Ella Lillian Wall (1892–1986)
Maryly Van Leer Peck (1930–2011) | Blake Wayne Van Leer (1926–1997) | Samuel Wall Van Leer
