= Antoinette Van Leer Polk =

Baroness de Charette (1847-1919)

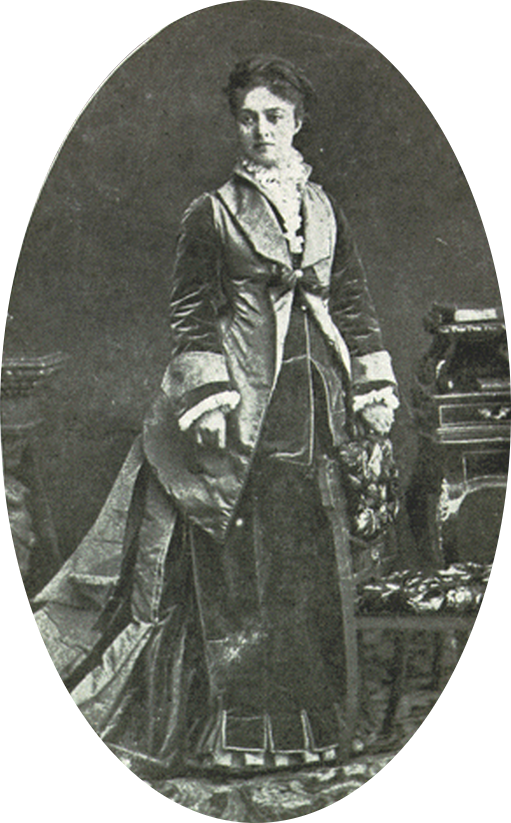
- Antoinette Van Leer Polk in 1912
- Born: October 27, 1847; Nashville, Tennessee, USA
- Died: February 3, 1919 (aged 71); Bouguenais, Loire-Atlantique, France
- Occupations: Equestrian, planter, socialite
- Title: Baroness
- Spouse: Athanase-Charles-Marie Charette de la Contrie (m. 1877; died 1911)
- Children: Antoine de Charette
- Parent(s): Andrew Jackson Polk; Rebecca Van Leer
- Relatives: Vanleer Polk (brother); William Polk (paternal grandfather); Anthony Wayne Van Leer (maternal grandfather); Leonidas Polk (paternal uncle); James K. Polk (paternal great-uncle)

Antoinette Van Leer Polk de Charette, Baroness de La Contrie (October 27, 1847 – February 3, 1919) was an American Southern belle in the Antebellum South and (by marriage) French aristocrat in the Gilded Age. She was born into the planter elite, the great-niece of the 11th President of the United States James K. Polk and a member of the influential Van Leer family through her mother. She was an heiress to plantations in Tennessee and a "Southern heroine" who warned Confederate soldiers of advancing Union troops during the American Civil War. After the war, she moved to Europe, where she took to foxhunting in the Roman Campagna of Italy and the English countryside, and later became a baroness and socialite in Paris and Brittany.

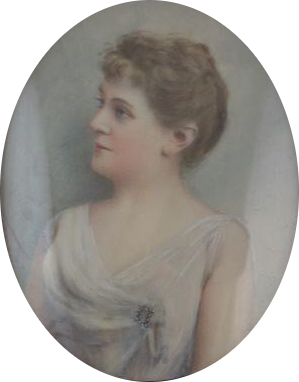
Miniature portrait done by Katherine Arthur Behenna, now kept at the New York Historical Society

== Early life and family background ==
Polk was born on October 27, 1847, in Nashville, Tennessee. Her father, Colonel Andrew Jackson Polk, was a planter who served in the Confederate States Army. Her mother, Rebecca Van Leer, was an heiress to an iron fortune from the Cumberland Furnace and the Van Leer family. Polk grew up at Ashwood Hall, a mansion in Ashwood near Columbia in Maury County, Tennessee with her parents and brother, Vanleer Polk.

Her paternal great-uncle, James K. Polk served as the 11th President of the United States from 1845 to 1849. Bishop Leonidas Polk, who served as a General in the Confederate States Army, was her uncle. She was also a descendant of General Anthony Wayne and Samuel Van Leer, both officers in the American Revolutionary War.

== American Civil War and fox-hunting ==
During the American Civil War, while visiting Mary Polk Branch she saw Northern forces on their way to Ashwood. Polk got on a horse and rode there before the Northerners to warn the Confederate soldiers of their arrival. As a result, she is credited as a "Southern heroine" for saving Confederate personnel. Unlike the Polks, her relatives on her mother's side fought for the Union.

After the war, Polk moved to Italy with her mother and her siblings. Her family later became friends with King Humbert I. She took to fox-hunting in the Roman Campagna of Italy, where she won a fox-hunt among forty female riders. She also participated in fox hunting in the English countryside.

== Personal life ==
In Italy, Polk met her future husband, General Baron Athanase-Charles-Marie Charette de la Contrie, then a Commander of the Papal Zouaves. Charette de la Contrie was a great-grandson of Charles X, the last king of France, a grandson of Charles Ferdinand, Duke of Berry and descendant of Louis XIII. They wed in Rome, Italy, on December 1, 1877. An aristocrat from the Vendée, he had served as a general in the Franco-Prussian War of 1870. They resided at the Avenue Hoche in the 8th arrondissement of Paris and at the Château de la Basse-Mothe in Bouguenais near Nantes. Her wounded father lived with them, until he died in Switzerland. Polk inherited plantations in Tennessee from him.

The couple had two children, Louise Marie, born in or near Genoa, Italy in 1866, raised by a series of governesses and later quietly married to Angelo Schinoni, possibly a relative of the midwife and governess who had delivered her, and Charles Antoine, later known as Antoine de Charette, born in or near Paris in 1869, who was first engaged to Gladys Spencer-Churchill, Duchess of Marlborough, and later married Susan Henning of Shelby County, Kentucky, the daughter of James W. Henning, a stockbroker on the New York Stock Exchange, in a lavish society wedding at the St. Patrick's Cathedral.

Her miniature portrait was done by Katherine Arthur Behenna for New York art collector and socialite Peter Marié. It was acquired by the New York Historical Society in 1905.

== Death and legacy ==
She died on February 3, 1919, at her Château de la Basse-Mothe in Brittany, France. Her son Antoine inherited her Southern plantations. Her miniature portrait was exhibited alongside others as part of a special exhibition of the Peter Marié Collection showing socialites of the Gilded Age from November 11, 2011, to September 9, 2012, at the New York Historical Society in New York City.
