= Greif, Inc. =

American manufacturing company

- Formerly: Greif Bros. Corporation
- Company type: Public company
- Traded as: NYSE: GEF (Class A); NYSE: GEF.B (Class B); S&P 400 component (GEF)
- Industry: Packaging
- Founded: 1877; 149 years ago
- Headquarters: Delaware, Ohio, U.S.
- Products: Industrial packaging
- Revenue: US$5. billion (2024)
- Operating income: US$527.1 million (2021)
- Net income: US$390.7 million (2021)
- Number of employees: 14,000 (2024)
- Website: greif.com

Greif, Inc. is a global leader in industrial packaging products and services based in Delaware, Ohio. Originally a manufacturer of barrels, the company is now focused on producing steel, fiber and plastic drums, IBCs, jerrycans, plastic bottles, closures, containerboard, corrugated products and adhesives. In 2018, the company ranked 617 on the Fortune 1000.

== History ==
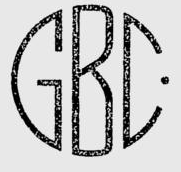
Greif Bros logo, 1978

The company was founded in Cleveland in 1877 as "Vanderwyst and Greif" by Charles Greif and his partner Albert Vanderwyst. After three brothers from the Greif family joined the company, it was renamed Greif Bros. Company, and focused on cooperage for the transportation of post-Civil War goods. In 1926, the company made its first public offering as The Greif Bros. Cooperage Corporation.

In 1951, the headquarters was moved from Cleveland to its current location in Delaware. In 1955, the company began producing fibre drums, followed by the introduction of plastic drum technology in 1964. Under the leadership of John C. Dempsey, the company transitioned out of the cooperage industry and into industrial packaging, formally dropping the Cooperage from its name in 1969.

By 1980, the company had approximately 100 manufacturing facilities in the United States and Canada. Today, spanning across 250+ facilities in 37 countries.

In the late 1990s, and early 2000s, Greif made a significant number of purchases of packaging and industrial businesses. Most notable among these was its purchase of the industrial packaging business of Finnish company Huhtamaeki Van Leer Oyj in 2000 for $620 million, which doubled the size of the company.

On February 11, 2019, Greif completed the acquisition of Caraustar Industries, a manufacturer of recycled materials and paper products with locations in the United States and Canada. Greif purchased Caraustar for $1.8 billion. In 2022, Greif acquired Lee Container, enhancing its plastic jerrycan production and North American footprint.

In August 2023, it was announced Greif had acquired a 51% stake in the Urbana, OH-headquartered paper partitions supplier, ColePak. Most recently, in 2024, Greif acquired Ipackchem, a global leader in barrier packaging for chemicals and food, further diversifying its product offerings.
