= Windsor Forge Mansion =

Historic house in Pennsylvania, United States

- U.S. National Register of Historic Places
- U.S. Historic district
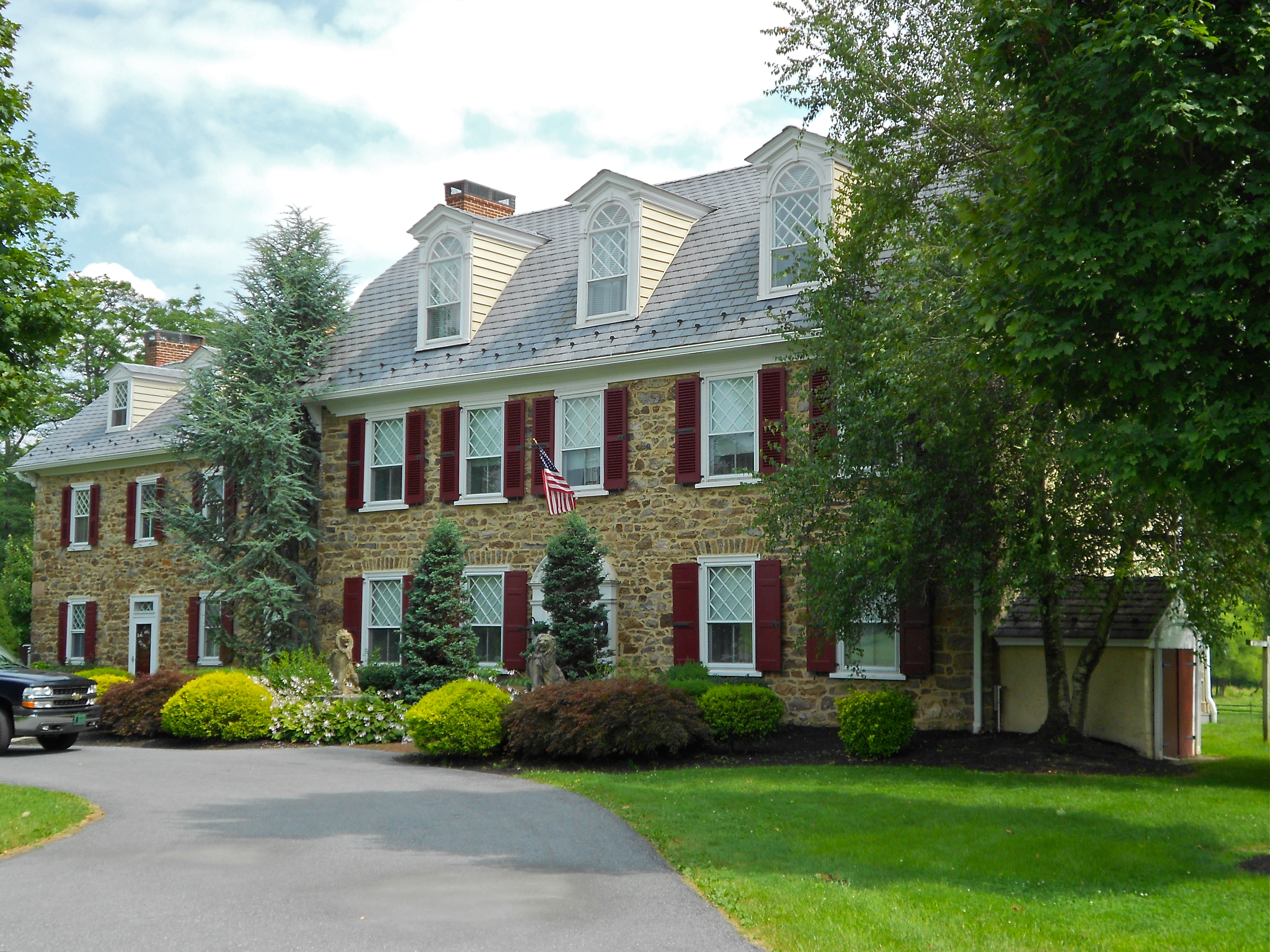

- Location within Pennsylvania Location within the United States
- Location: Windsor Road south of Bootjack Road, Caernarvon Township, Pennsylvania
- Coordinates: 40°7′40″N 75°57′35″W
- Area: 5 acres (2.0 ha)
- Built: 1742, c. 1765, c. 1815
- Architectural style: Federal
- NRHP reference No.: 89002283
- Added to NRHP: January 4, 1990

Windsor Forge Mansion, also known as Windsor Place, is an historic home and national historic district located in Caernarvon Township, Lancaster County, Pennsylvania, United States.

It was listed on the National Register of Historic Places in 1990.

== History and architectural features ==
This property was built by William Branson and later owned by the well-known local Van Leer family, who owned several nearby iron businesses. Dr. Bernardhus Van Leer and his family were listed as owners of the mansion.

This district includes four contributing buildings and three contributing objects. The buildings are the Ironmaster's Mansion, a stone smokehouse (c. 1765), a stone spring house (c. 1765), and a stone summer kitchen/servant's quarters (c. 1765).

The three objects are pieces by noted artist and poet Blanche Nevin (1841–1925), who purchased Windsor Forge Mansion in 1899. Her grandfather Robert Jenkins (1769–1848) had previously been ironmaster and congressman.

The oldest section of the Ironmaster's Mansion was built circa 1742; the western section was built circa 1765, and the connecting middle section was built circa 1815. A shed roof porch was added in 1899, at which time the structure was renovated. The house is 2 1/2 stories and was built using stone. Nevin also added a studio to the house.

== See also ==
- Samuel Van Leer
- Reading Furnace Historic District
