= Isaac Van Leer =

Ironmaster (b. 1772, d. 1821)

- Born: January 7, 1772; Easttown Township, Province of Pennsylvania
- Died: August 10, 1821 (aged 49); Dickson, Tennessee
- Occupation: Ironmaster
- Spouse: Elizabeth Culbertson
- Children: Wayne, Linford, Margaret, Hannah
- Parent(s): Samuel Van Leer; Hannah Wayne
- Relatives: Anthony Wayne (uncle); Anthony Wayne Van Leer (brother); Bernardhus Van Leer (grandfather); Isaac Wayne (grandfather)

Isaac Van Leer (January 7, 1772 – August 10, 1821) was a Pennsylvania ironmaster and owned the Hibernia Furnace, Springton Forge and historic Hibernia House in West Caln Township, Pennsylvania. He was a member of the influential Van Leer family and was the son of Samuel Van Leer, a captain in the Continental Army during the American Revolutionary War.

== Biography ==
Van Leer was born in 1772 in Easttown Township in the Province of Pennsylvania to Samuel and Hannah (Wayne) Van Leer. His father Samuel Van Leer, served as a captain during the American Revolutionary War.

In 1814, Van Leer purchased land and the Hibernia Iron Works in West Caln Township, Pennsylvania. He also owned the Springton Forge in West Nantmeal Township, Pennsylvania. In 1815 he purchased the Hibernia House and lived there. In 1816, he declared bankruptcy and gave the Springton Forge property to his wife's family in order to settle his debts. In 1817, he sold the Hibernia location at a financial loss due to flooding damage.

On April 17, 1800, he married Elizabeth Culbertson and together they had four children - Wayne, Linford, Margaret and Hannah. All children would own or be involved with the iron industry, except Lindford who died as a child from a fall. Unlike most of his family, Isaac was a Presbyterian.

His son, Wayne, moved to Texas in the 1800s and enlisted with the Union Army during the American Civil War at age 15.
