= Anthony Wayne Van Leer =

Ironworks owner (1783–1863)

- Born: March 3, 1783; Chester County, Pennsylvania
- Died: July 9, 1863 (aged 80); Nashville, Tennessee
- Occupation: Ironmaster
- Parent(s): Samuel Van Leer; Hannah Wayne
- Relatives: Bernardhus Van Leer (grandfather); Isaac Van Leer (brother); Anthony Wayne(Uncle); VanLeer Polk (grandson); George Howard Earle Jr. (grandnephew); Florence Van Leer Earle Coates (grandniece)

Anthony Wayne Van Leer (March 3, 1783 – July 9, 1863) was an American ironmaster and owner of the Cumberland Furnace in Dickson County, Tennessee. He was a member of the influential Van Leer family, the son of Samuel Van Leer, captain in the Continental Army during the American Revolutionary War and nephew of General Anthony Wayne. The town of Vanleer, Tennessee is named after him.

== Biography ==
Van Leer was born in Chester County, Pennsylvania on April 6, 1783, to Samuel and Hannah (Wayne) Van Leer. His father, Samuel Van Leer was a captain in the Continental Army during the American Revolutionary War. Van Leer would join his family's iron business in Pennsylvania.

On June 12, 1816, he married Rebecca Brady and together they had seven children but only 2 daughters survived to adulthood.

In 1825, Van Leer began to invest in the iron business in Tennessee and purchased the Cumberland Furnace with partners from Montgomery Bell who was known as the "Iron Master of Middle Tennessee." Van Leer became one of the wealthiest ironmasters in Tennessee. By 1840, the Cumberland Furnace employed 114 slaves. Despite their status as slaves, men were paid on average $12 a month and women $5.

During the American Civil War, his family had close ties to the Union, the Underground Railroad and Free Negro communities. Furnace operations ceased in 1862 for the remainder of the war. Despite the fact that the Union army utilized scorched earth tactics, and unlike other furnaces in the area, the Cumberland Furnace was not destroyed by the Union Army. His home was also used as a headquarters.

He died on July 9, 1863, in Nashville, Tennessee and the ownership of Cumberland Furnace passed to his grandchildren Vanleer Kirkman and Mary Florence Kirkman. Mary and her husband bought out her brother's share of the furnace. Mary's husband was a Union Captain. All former slaves were kept on payroll.

== Legacy ==
The town of Vanleer, Tennessee is named in his honor. Van Leer hired famed William Strickland to design his children's homes.
