= Marple Township, Pennsylvania =

Township in Pennsylvania, US

Marple Township
- Township
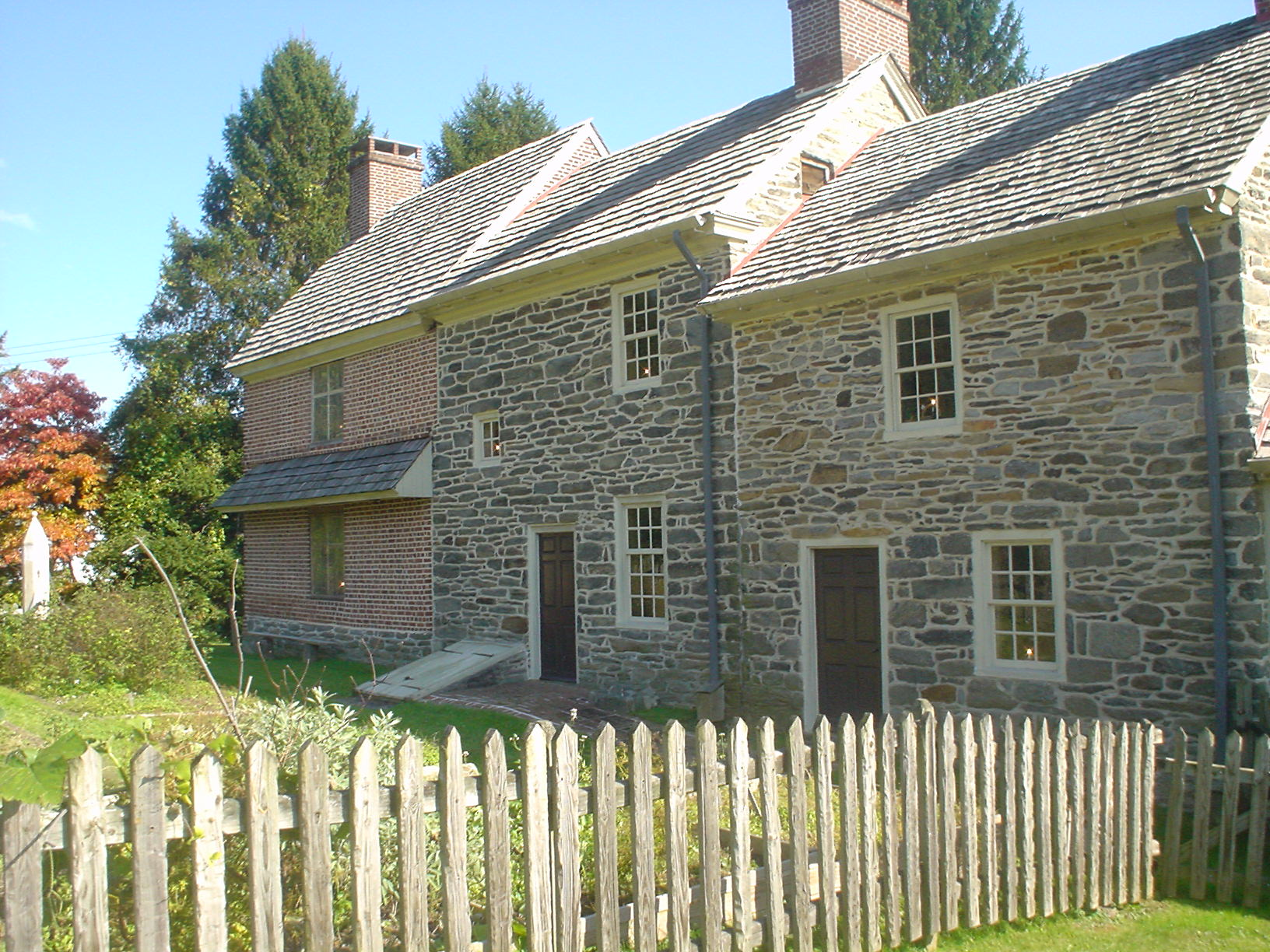
- Seventeenth-century Thomas Massey House on Lawrence Road

- Seal

- Location in Delaware County and the state of Pennsylvania

- Location of Pennsylvania in the United States
- Coordinates: 39°58′30″N 75°21′29″W
- Country: United States
- State: Pennsylvania
- County: Delaware
- Incorporation: 1684

Area
  - Total: 10.52 sq mi (27.24 km^{2})
  - Land: 10.20 sq mi (26.42 km^{2})
  - Water: 0.31 sq mi (0.81 km^{2})
- Elevation: 361 ft (110 m)

Population (2010)
  - Total: 23,428
  - Estimate (2016): 23,780
  - Density: 2,330.9/sq mi (899.96/km^{2})
- Time zone: UTC-5 (EST)
  - Summer (DST): UTC-4 (EDT)
- ZIP codes: 19008, 19063, 19064
- Area code: 610
- FIPS code: 42-045-47616
- Website: www.marpletwp.com

Marple Township is a township in Delaware County, Pennsylvania, United States. It contains the census designated place of Broomall. The population was estimated at 23,743 as of 2015. ZIP codes include mainly 19008, as well as 19064 and 19063. The township is run by Marple Township board of commissioners.

== History ==
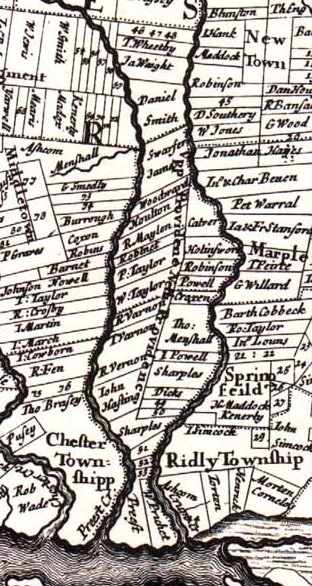
Portion of 1687 Holme map. Marple Township is on the right side of the map, below Newtown and above Springfield.

The Delaware County area was first settled by Quakers who came to Pennsylvania by the Delaware River on September 29, 1683. The ship they used was called the Endeavor. Marple Township was originally settled in 1684 and was recognized as a township in the same year. The original spelling of the township was Marpool, but the spelling was changed to Marple in the Thomas Holme map of 1687. The Marpool spelling may have been an error.

One of the settlers who arrived on the Endeavor was Thomas Massey. He obtained a 300-acre plantation in the township from William Penn. The house he built on the land is still preserved today, as well as some of its surrounding gardens. Another historical family known as the Van Leers built several historical sites and lived in the area. Dr. Bernardhus Van Leer owned the nearby Van Leer House and his family built the nearby Van Leer Cabin.

In 1948 Marple Township got its first police station. Before, there was no local branch, no patrols of the police, and only a county sheriff. Crimes were mostly settled between victims and perpetrators themselves.

Marple became a first-class township in 1961.

== Geography ==
According to the United States Census Bureau, the township has a total area of 10.5 square miles (27.2 km^{2}), of which 10.2 square miles (26.4 km^{2}) is land and 0.3 square mile (0.8 km^{2}; 2.95%) is water.

The community of Broomall is located in, but is not coterminous with, Marple Township—the township also includes part of the ZIP codes of Springfield and Media. Other villages include Larchmont (also in Newtown Township) and Lawrence Park.

Waterways in Marple Township include Crum Creek, Darby Creek, Hotland Run, Springton Lake and Trout Run.

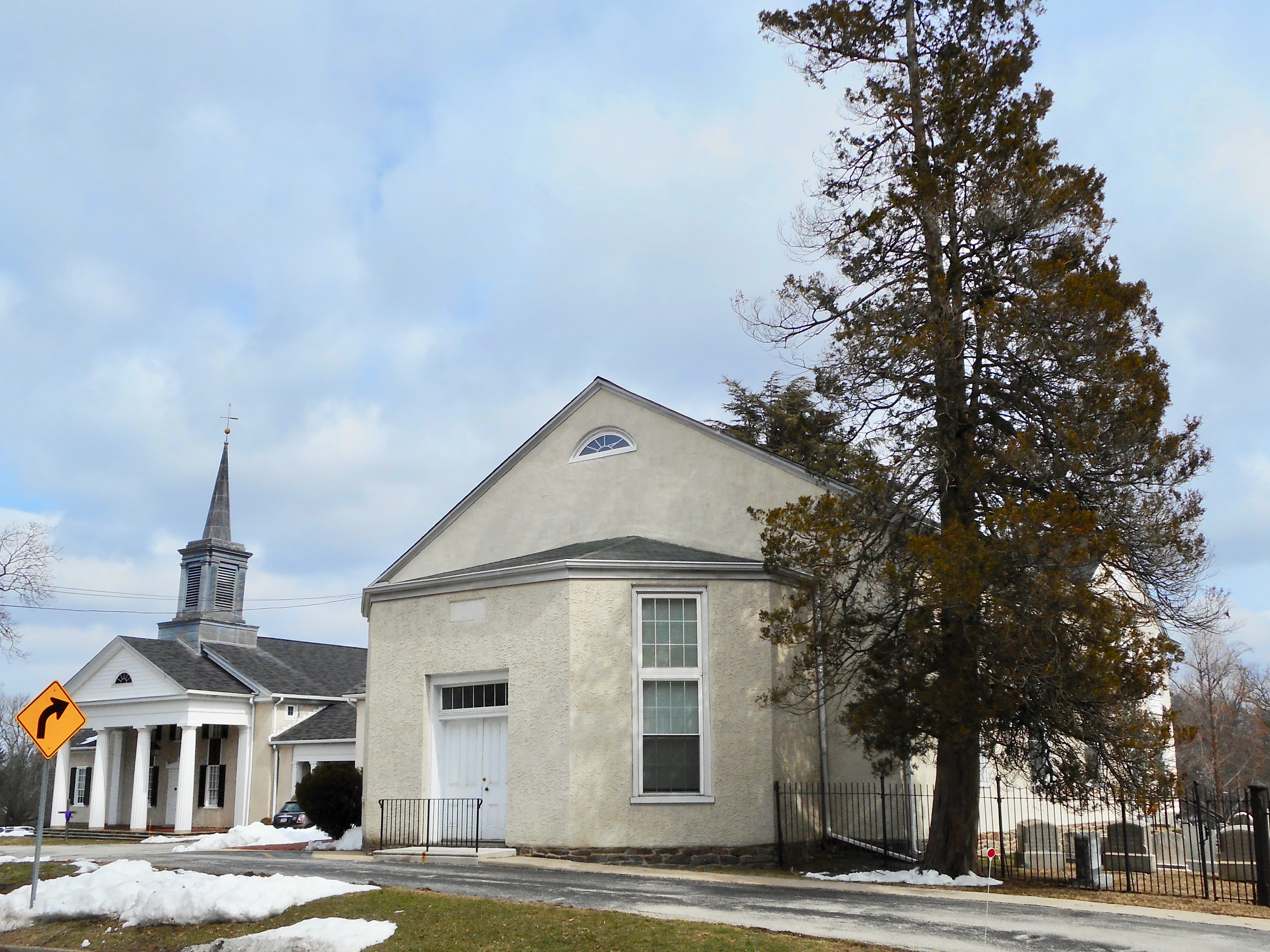
Marple Presbyterian Church, built 1834–1835, oldest church in the township

=== Adjacent municipalities ===
- Radnor Township - north
- Haverford Township - east
- Nether Providence Township - south
- Springfield Township - southeast
- Upper Providence Township - southwest
- Newtown Township - northwest

=== Climate ===
Marple Township straddles the boundary between a hot-summer humid continental climate (Dfa) and a humid subtropical climate (Cfa). The average monthly temperature in Broomall ranges from 31.9 °F in January to 77.1 °F in July. The hardiness zone is 7a and the annual average absolute minimum temperature in Broomall is 1.9 °F.

== Demographics ==
As of the census of 2010, there were 23,428 people, down slightly from 23,737 people in 2000. The racial makeup of the township was 89.6% White, 2.1% African American, 0.1% Native American, 7.0% Asian, 0.3% from other races, and 0.9% from two or more races. Hispanic or Latino people of any race were 1.3% of the population.

The 2000 census showed 8,623 households, and 6,415 families residing in the township. The population density was 2,326.1 inhabitants per square mile (898.1/km^{2}). There were 8,797 housing units at an average density of 862.1 per square mile (332.9/km^{2}). The racial makeup of the township was 92.60% White, 1.10% African American, 0.09% Native American, 5.51% Asian, 0.12% from other races, and 0.59% from two or more races. Hispanic or Latino people of any race were 0.66% of the population.

Historical population
Census	Pop.	Note	%±
1930	1,553		—
1940	2,170		39.7%
1950	4,779		120.2%
1960	19,722		312.7%
1970	25,040		27.0%
1980	23,642		−5.6%
1990	23,123		−2.2%
2000	23,737		2.7%
2010	23,428		−1.3%
2020	24,214		3.4%

There were 8,623 households, out of which 30.0% had children under the age of 18 living with them, 64.1% were married couples living together, 7.6% had a female householder with no husband present, and 25.6% were non-families. 22.6% of all households were made up of individuals, and 13.0% had someone living alone who was 65 years of age or older. The average household size was 2.64 and the average family size was 3.12.

In the township the population was spread out, with 21.8% under the age of 18, 6.3% from 18 to 24, 24.8% from 25 to 44, 25.0% from 45 to 64, and 22.0% who were 65 years of age or older. The median age was 43 years. For every 100 females, there were 89.4 males. For every 100 females age 18 and over, there were 85.1 males.

The median income for a household in the township was $59,577, and the median income for a family was $71,829. Males had a median income of $47,062 versus $32,304 for females. The per capita income for the township was $28,494. About 2.1% of families and 4.6% of the population were below the poverty line, including 3.7% of those under age 18 and 5.0% of those age 65 or over.

== Government ==
Marple Township is governed by a Board of Commissioners made up of representatives from each of the township's wards which meets for regular sessions. The current commissioners, by ward, are Joseph Rufo (R-1), Jan Ceton (R-2), Robert Fortebouno (R-3), John Lucas (R-4), John Longacre (R-5), Michael Molinaro (R-6), and Daniel Leefson (R-7). Rufo currently serves as the board's president.

== Politics ==
Presidential elections results
Year	Republican	Democratic
2012	53.5% 7,010	45.8% 6,008
2008	51.1% 6,920	48.0% 6,503

Marple generally leans to the right on the political spectrum. In the 2008 general elections, the township voted Republican for every office except for the General Assembly representative from the 166th district.

Along with Aston, Bethel, Chadds Ford, Concord, Edgmont, Middletown, Newtown, Springfield, and Tinicum, Marple was one of the ten Delaware County municipalities to vote Republican in the 2008 presidential election. The county as a whole voted Democratic.

== Education ==
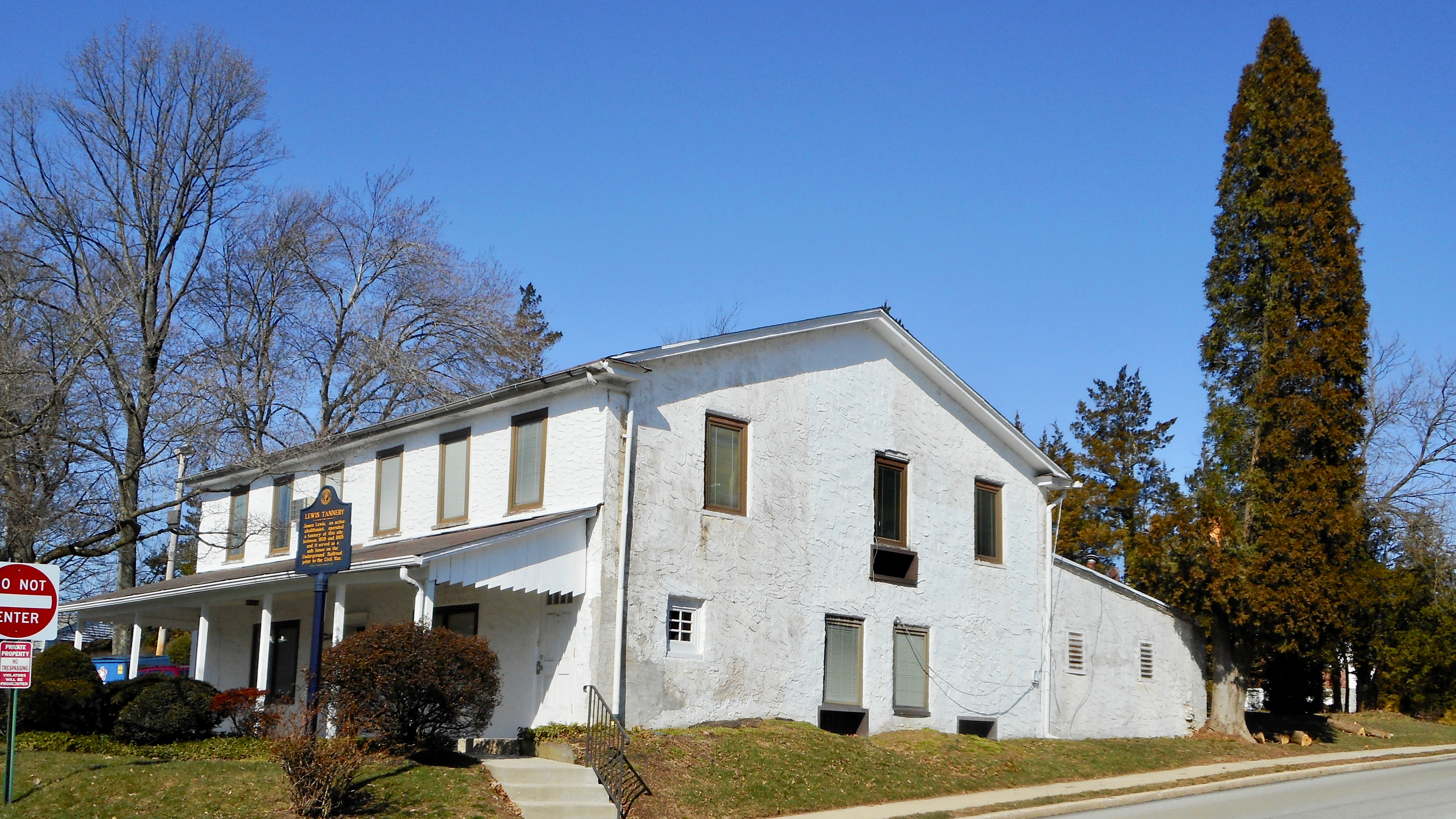
Lewis Tannery was used as a safe house on the Underground Railroad.

Marple Township lies within the Marple Newtown School District. The district has four elementary schools, one middle school, and one high school.

Delaware County Community College, a public, two-year community college, is also located in Marple Township; this campus has a Media mailing address.

The township is also served by the Marple Public Library.

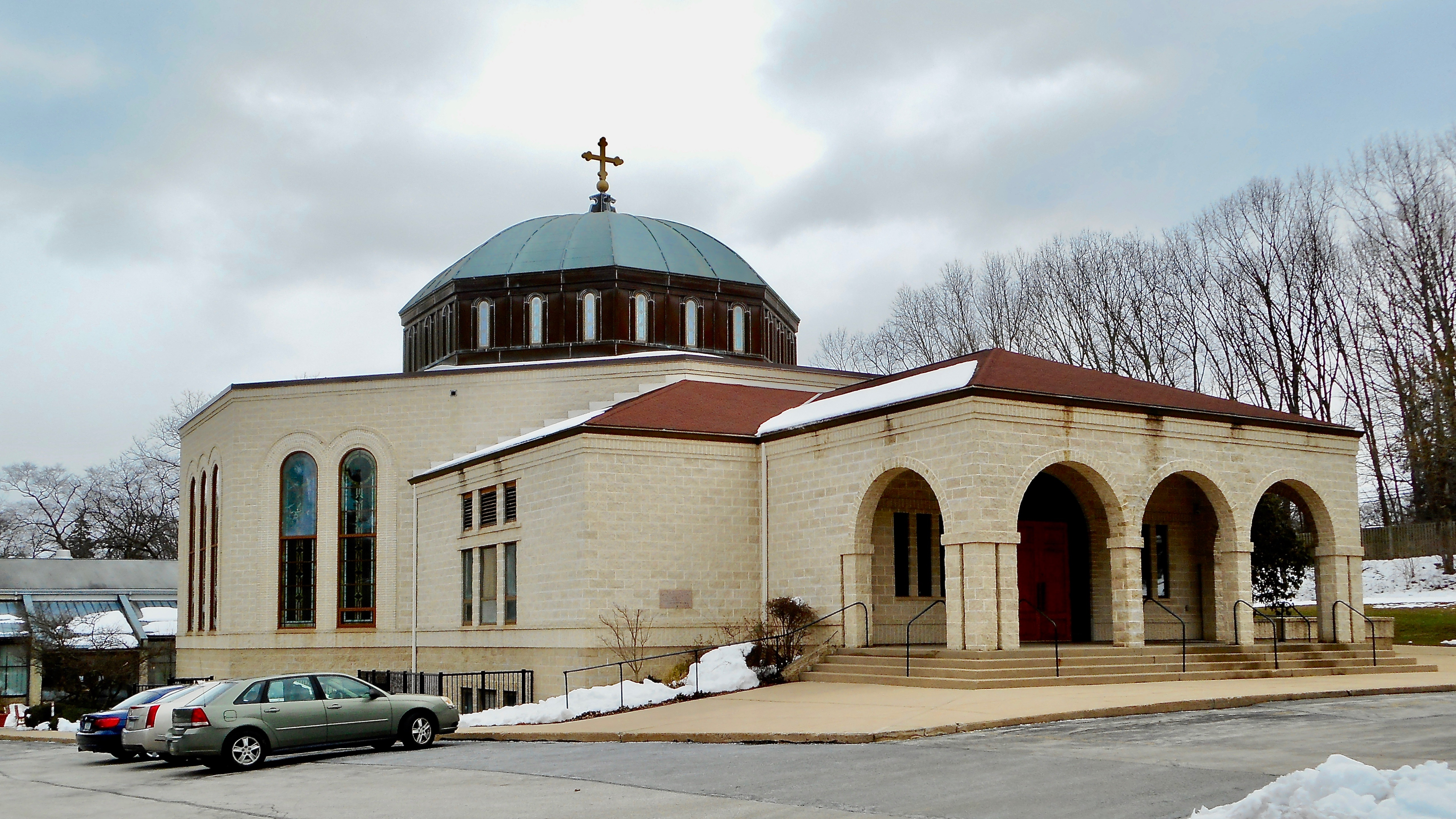
St. Luke Greek Orthodox Church on N. Malin Road

== Parks ==
Marple Township has a system of eleven parks. They are maintained by the municipal government.

- Broomall Fields - contains Little League Baseball fields for Marple Little League
- Green Bank Farm - a large field with a walking and hiking trail
- Highland Avenue Park - a small park with a roller hockey rink, basketball court, and tennis backboard
- Kent Park - contains a playground area, a picnic area with barbecues, a gazebo with picnic benches, a stream, a paved walking trail, and tennis courts
- Malin Road Tot Lot - same features as Kent Park
- Marple Gardens - features a playground, picnic area with barbecues, basketball court, and a kids baseball / softball field which is used for Marple Tee-Ball
- New Ardmore Avenue Park - playground, picnic area with barbecues, basketball court, large fields, and creek
- Old Marple School Park - playground, picnic area, walking trail, and sledding hill
- South Marple Little League - tennis courts, roller hockey rink, and snack bar
- Thomas Fields - two Little League baseball fields, a Babe Ruth baseball field, two snack bars, a small playground, and trail to Kent Park
- Veteran's Memorial Park - large playground, walking trail, large field, entertainment gazebo, restrooms, and soda machines

== Transportation ==
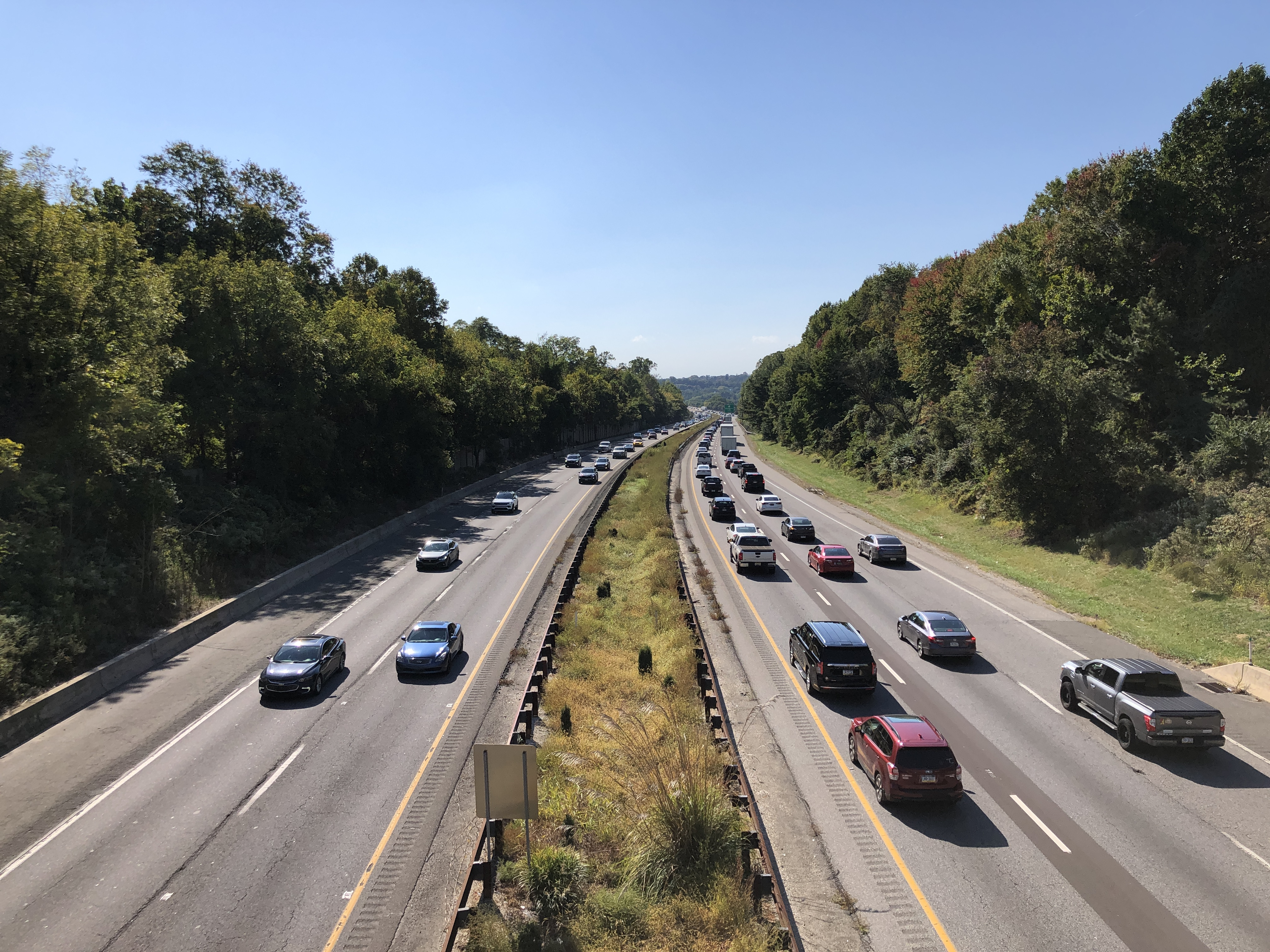
I-476 "Blue Route" southbound in Marple Township

As of 2021, there were 106.26 miles (171.01 km) of public roads in Marple Township, of which 25.81 miles (41.54 km) were maintained by Pennsylvania Department of Transportation (PennDOT) and 80.45 miles (129.47 km) were maintained by the township.

Roads serving Marple Township include U.S. Route 1, which passes north–south through the southern part of the township along a freeway; Pennsylvania Route 3, which passes east–west through the northern part of the township along West Chester Pike; Pennsylvania Route 252, which passes north–south through the western part of the township along Newtown Street Road; Pennsylvania Route 320, which passes north–south through the township along Sproul Road; and Interstate 476, which passes north–south through the eastern part of the township along the Blue Route and has interchanges with US 1 and PA 3.

SEPTA provides Suburban Bus service to Marple Township along Route 104, which follows West Chester Pike through the township on its route between West Chester and 69th Street Transportation Center in Upper Darby; Route 107, which runs from the Lawrence Park Shopping Center in the township to 69th Street Transportation Center via the Springfield Mall; Route 112, which follows Media Line Road and West Chester Pike through the township on its route between Delaware County Community College and the 69th Street Transportation Center; Route 115, which offers weekday service along Media Line Road and West Chester Pike through the township on its route between Delaware Community College and the Darby Transportation Center in Darby and the Philadelphia International Airport; Route 118, which follows Newtown Street Road through the township on its route between Newtown Square and the Chester Transit Center in Chester; Route 120, which follows West Chester Pike through the township on its route between Cheyney University and the 69th Street Transportation Center; and Route 126, which runs from the Lawrence Park Shopping Center in the township to 69th Street Transportation Center via Havertown.

== Notable people ==
- Bernardhus Van Leer (1687-1790), Early settler of the Province of Pennsylvania
- Samuel Van Leer (1747-1825), Captain in the Continental Army during the American Revolution
- John Bartram (1699-1777), American botanist, horticulturist, and explorer
