= Delaware County Office of the Medical Examiner =

- Seal of the Delaware County Office of the Medical Examiner

Agency overview
- Formed: 1979
- Jurisdiction: Delaware County, Pennsylvania
- Headquarters: 340 N. Middletown Road; Lima, Pennsylvania 19037
- Agency executive: Albert Chu, M.D., Chief Medical Examiner
- Website: delcopa.gov/medical-examiner

The Delaware County Office of the Medical Examiner is the office responsible for the investigation of all sudden, unexpected, and/or violent deaths in Delaware County, Pennsylvania.

Originally known as the Delaware County Coroner's Office, the County updated the medicolegal death investigation system to a modern medical examiner system in 1979 in response to public demand and facilitated by home rule charter. The Office is located within the Fair Acres Complex in Lima.

== Organization ==
The Office of the Medical Examiner is staffed by two full time board certified forensic pathologists, an administrator, a Chief of Forensic Investigations, medicolegal death investigators, autopsy technicians, an evidence technician, an office coordinator, and a bereavement counselor. The Office is currently headed by Chief Medical Examiner Dr. Albert Chu.
