= Carlos Clark Van Leer =

American military officer (b. 1865, d. 1953)

Personal details
- Born: Carlos Clark Van Leer; October 15, 1865 Nashville, Tennessee, U.S.
- Died: November 3, 1953 (aged 88) Washington, D.C., U.S.
- Resting place: Arlington National Cemetery
- Children: 2
- Relatives: Samuel Van Leer (great-grandfather)
- Education: Vanderbilt University

Military service
- Allegiance: United States of America
- Branch/service: United States Army
- Years of service: 1885–1904
- Rank: Captain
- Battles/wars: Spanish–American War

Carlos Clark Van Leer (October 15, 1865 – November 3, 1953) was an American military officer who served in the United States Army during the Spanish-American War and as Chief of the Personnel Classification Board in the United States Department of the Treasury. He was a member of the influential Van Leer family.

== Early life and education ==
Van Leer was born on October 15, 1865 in Nashville, Tennessee, to Samuel Van Leer and Alice Clark. He graduated with a degree in law from Vanderbilt University in 1895. He married Harriet Taylor Draper in Washington, Kansas on August 23, 1905. He was a member of the influential Van Leer family and his great-grandfather Samuel Van Leer was a captain in the Continental Army during the American Revolutionary War. Both his sons Anthony and Carlos served as military officers. His son Anthony Wayne Van Leer also had a long prominent military career as an officer in the Navy. After graduating from Dartmouth as an engineer, Anthony served during World War II and later worked for the White House on various engineering projects. His son Carlos graduated from Yale University and served as an officer during multiple wars.

== Career ==
Van Leer served in the US Army as a first lieutenant and was promoted to captain. He served in the Spanish–American War and returned home to work as a government official running the treasury branch in Tennessee Van Leer served as the assistant director for the Office of Management and Budget and later worked as the Chief of the Personnel Classification Board in the United States Department of the Treasury. Van Leer died on November 3, 1953, and was interred at Arlington National Cemetery.
