= West Nantmeal Township, Pennsylvania =

Township in Pennsylvania, US

West Nantmeal Township
- Township
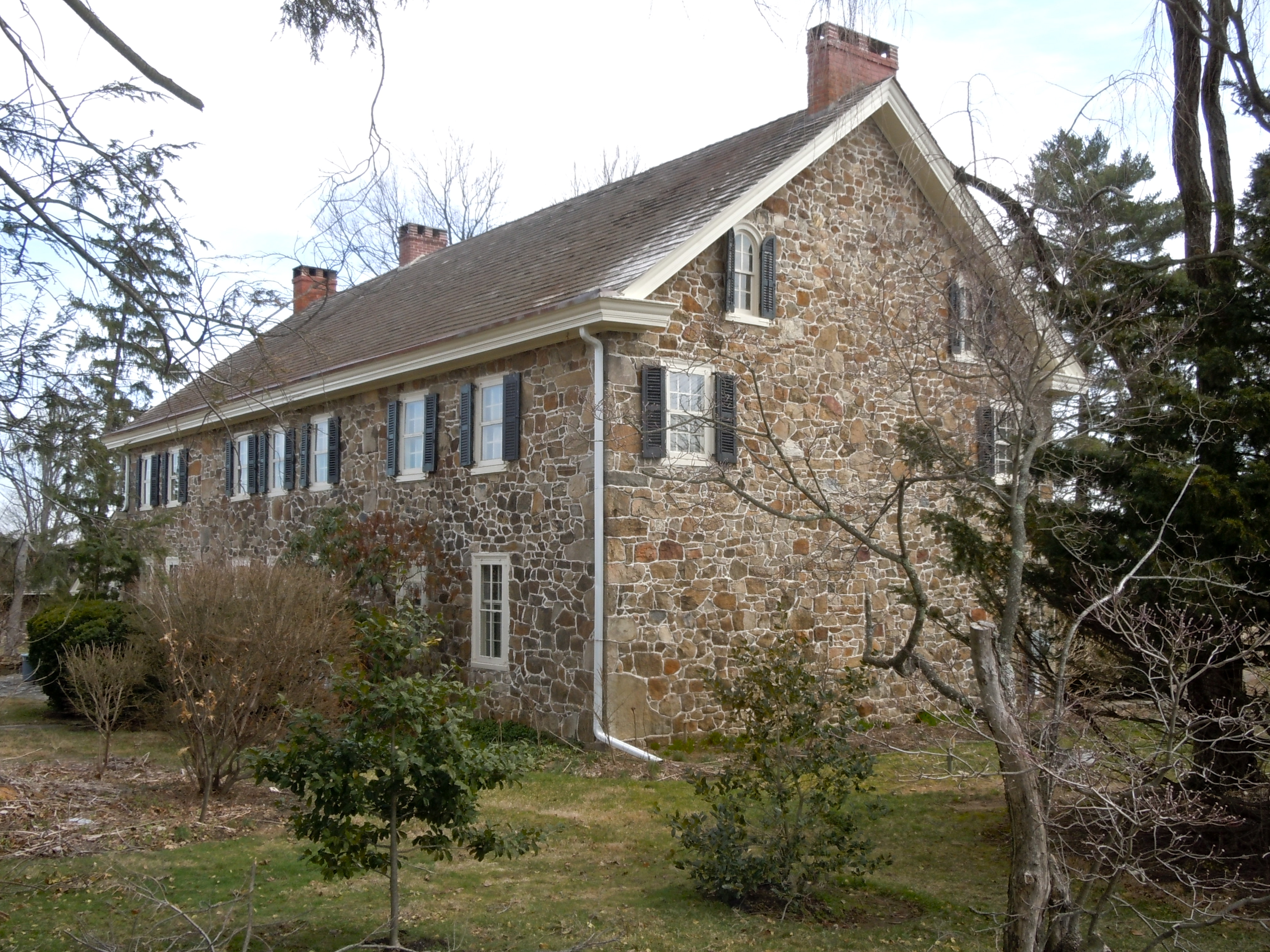
- Pleasant Hill Plantation, a historic site in the township

- Location in Chester County and the state of Pennsylvania

- Location of Pennsylvania in the United States
- Coordinates: 40°07′27″N 75°48′55″W
- Country: United States
- State: Pennsylvania
- County: Chester

Area
  - Total: 13.54 sq mi (35.07 km^{2})
  - Land: 13.33 sq mi (34.52 km^{2})
  - Water: 0.21 sq mi (0.55 km^{2})
- Elevation: 686 ft (209 m)

Population (2020)
  - Total: 2,251
  - Estimate (2023): 2,259
  - Density: 164.4/sq mi (63.49/km^{2})
- Time zone: UTC-5 (EST)
  - Summer (DST): UTC-4 (EDT)
- Area code: 610
- FIPS code: 42-029-83664
- Website: https://www.westnantmeal.com/

West Nantmeal Township is a township in Chester County, Pennsylvania, United States. The population was 2,251 at the 2020 census. It and East Nantmeal Township were originally part of a single Nantmeal Township, which was divided in 1739.

== History ==
Nantmeal was named by Welsh immigrants from the village of Nantmel in Radnorshire, now part of Powys. The Welsh name, Nantmel, means 'the valley of Mael', a tenth-century prince. The incorrect belief that it means 'Honey Brook' is based on a confusion between the personal name 'Mael', and the Welsh word 'mêl', 'honey'. The Isabella Furnace and Pleasant Hill Plantation, also known as Van Leer Place are listed on the National Register of Historic Places.

== Geography ==
According to the U.S. Census Bureau, the township has a total area of 13.5 square miles (35 km^{2}), of which 13.4 square miles (35 km^{2}) is land and 0.1 square miles (0.26 km^{2}), or 0.45%, is water. The township is partially located in the Hopewell Big Woods.

== Recreation ==
Portions of the Pennsylvania State Game Lands Number 43 are located in the township.

== Demographics ==
Historical population
Census	Pop.	Note	%±
1930	624		—
1940	565		−9.5%
1950	806		42.7%
1960	968		20.1%
1970	1,285		32.7%
1980	1,766		37.4%
1990	1,958		10.9%
2000	2,031		3.7%
2010	2,170		6.8%
2020	2,251		3.7%

At the 2010 census, the township was 94.4% non-Hispanic White, 1.1% Black or African American, 0.3% Native American, 0.6% Asian, 0.1% Native Hawaiian or other Pacific Islander, and 1.1% were two or more races. 2.3% of the population were of Hispanic or Latino ancestry.

As of the census of 2000, there were 2,031 people, 715 households, and 566 families residing in the township. The population density was 151.4 inhabitants per square mile (58.5/km^{2}). There were 745 housing units at an average density of 55.5 per square mile (21.4/km^{2}). The racial makeup of the township was 97.54% White, 0.74% African American, 0.30% Asian, 0.25% from other races, and 1.18% from two or more races. Hispanic or Latino of any race were 0.84% of the population.

There were 715 households, out of which 36.1% had children under the age of 18 living with them, 71.3% were married couples living together, 4.6% had a female householder with no husband present, and 20.8% were non-families. 19.0% of all households were made up of individuals, and 8.7% had someone living alone who was 65 years of age or older. The average household size was 2.84 and the average family size was 3.24.

In the township. the population was spread out, with 27.6% under the age of 18, 5.7% from 18 to 24, 27.6% from 25 to 44, 26.5% from 45 to 64, and 12.5% who were 65 years of age or older. The median age was 39 years. For every 100 females there were 104.3 males. For every 100 females age 18 and over, there were 101.6 males.

The median income for a household in the township was $52,128, and the median income for a family was $55,776. Males had a median income of $40,938 versus $29,813 for females. The per capita income for the township was $21,348. About 2.5% of families and 4.4% of the population were below the poverty line, including 6.8% of those under age 18 and 3.1% of those age 65 or over.

== Education ==
The school district is Twin Valley School District.

Twin Valley Middle School and Twin Valley High School are in Caernarvon Township, Berks County, and have Elverson postal addresses.

== Transportation ==
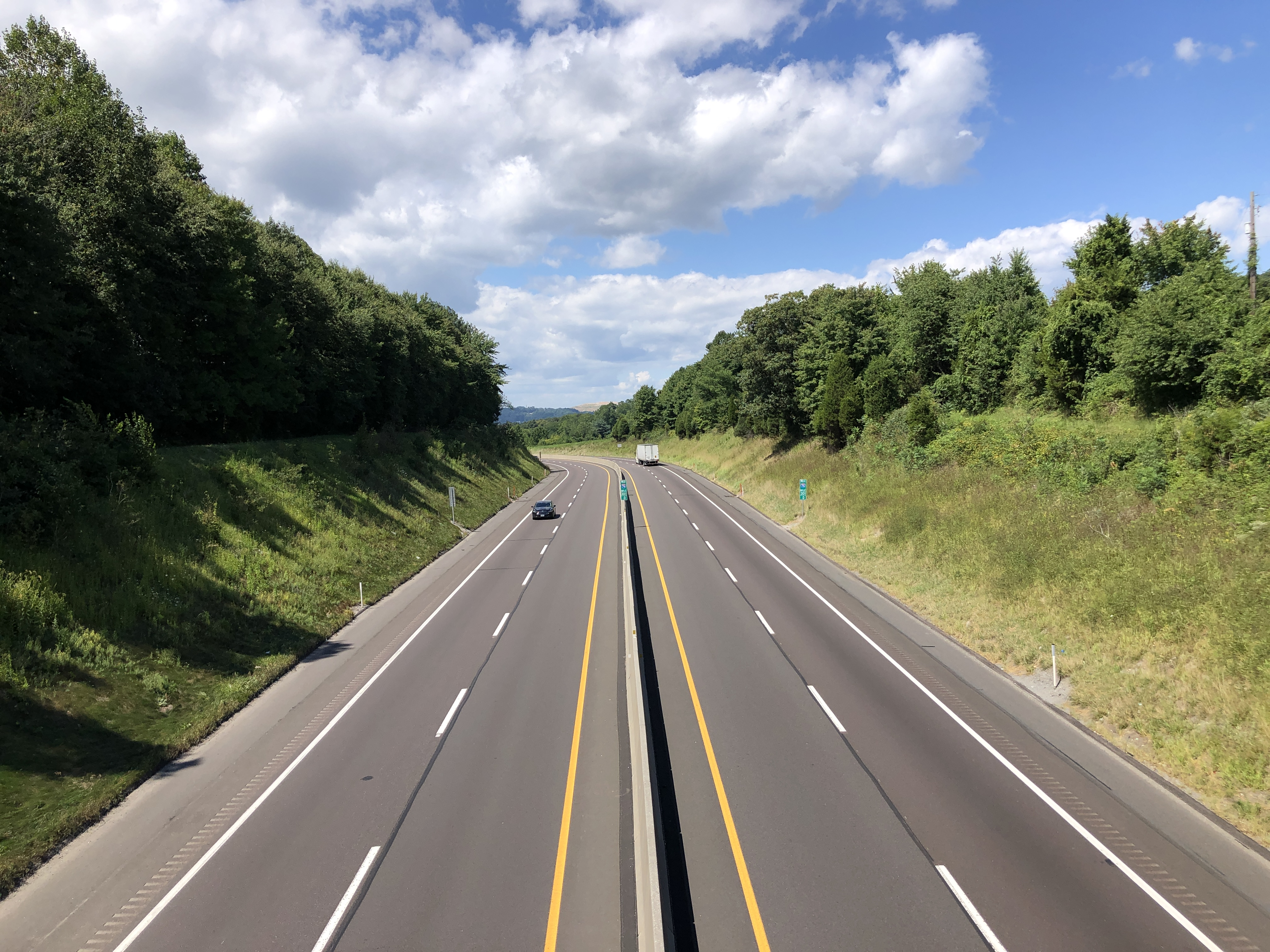
Pennsylvania Turnpike/I-76 westbound in West Nantmeal Township

As of 2006, there were 34.76 miles (55.94 km) of public roads in West Nantmeal Township, of which 3.10 miles (4.99 km) were maintained by the Pennsylvania Turnpike Commission (PTC), 16.15 miles (25.99 km) were maintained by the Pennsylvania Department of Transportation (PennDOT) and 15.51 miles (24.96 km) were maintained by the township.

The Pennsylvania Turnpike (I-76) is the most prominent highway passing through West Nantmeal Township, but the nearest interchange is neighboring Caernarvon Township. Pennsylvania Route 23 follows Ridge Road along an east–west alignment across the northern corner of the township. Pennsylvania Route 82 follows North Manor Road along a north–south alignment through the middle of the township. Pennsylvania Route 282 follows Creek Road east from PA 82 across the southeastern portion of the township. Pennsylvania Route 345 follows Bulltown Road northeastward from PA 82 in the northeastern portion of the township. Finally, Pennsylvania Route 401 follows Conestoga Road along an east–west alignment across the northern corner of the township just south of PA 23.

== Notable people ==
- Jesse James (1794–1875), member of the Pennsylvania House of Representatives
- George Lippard (1822–1854), 19th-century American novelist, journalist, and playwright
- Samuel Van Leer, (1747–1825) well-known local ironmaster and captain in the American Revolution
