= Richard Conner =

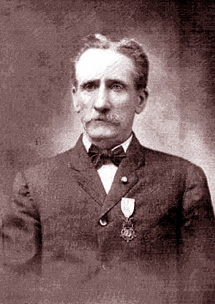
- Born: December 23, 1843; Philadelphia, Pennsylvania, U.S.
- Died: November 4, 1923 (aged 79); Philadelphia, Pennsylvania, U.S.
- Military career
- Allegiance: United States of America; Union
- Branch: United States Army; Union Army
- Service years: 1861 - 1865
- Rank: Sergeant
- Unit: 6th Regiment, New Jersey Volunteer Infantry
- Conflicts: American Civil War; *Battle of Chancellorsville; *Battle of Gettysburg; *Mine Run Campaign
- Awards: Medal of Honor

Richard Conner (December 23, 1843 – November 4, 1923) was an American Civil War Union Army soldier who received the Medal of Honor for his bravery in action.

== Biography ==
A 17-year-old resident of Burlington, New Jersey when he enlisted in the 6th New Jersey Volunteer Infantry on August 7, 1861, he was mustered in for three years of service as a private in Company F on August 26, 1861. During his first year of enlistment his regiment fought in the 1862 Peninsular Campaign (most notably in the May 1862 Battle of Williamsburg and the Battle of Fair Oaks), and in the August 29, 1862 Battle of Second Bull Run. It was during that engagement that he performed his act of bravery that he was eventually awarded the Medal of Honor for.

He was promoted to Corporal on September 10, 1862, and to Sergeant on February 4, 1863. He served with the regiment through its participation in the 1863 Battle of Chancellorsville (where he was wounded), the Battle of Gettysburg and the Mine Run Campaign. With less than a year left of his initial term of service, he re-enlisted early on February 18, 1864. When the original enlistments of the 6th New Jersey expired by law in September 1864, new recruits and re-enlistees of the regiment were folded into the 8th New Jersey Volunteer Infantry. Sergeant Conner was transferred to the 8th New Jersey's Company E, with whom he served until the end of the Civil War in May 1865. He was mustered out of service on July 17, 1865.

After the war he moved to Philadelphia, Pennsylvania, and was a resident of that city when he was awarded the Medal of Honor on September 17, 1897, which recognized his act of bravery 35 years later.

He died in Philadelphia, Pennsylvania, and was buried there in North Cedar Hill Cemetery in Section W3, Lot 28. His grave is marked by an upright government-issue Medal of Honor marker, which was erected in 2000, seventy-six years after his death.

== Medal of Honor citation ==
Rank and organization. Private, Company F, 6th New Jersey Infantry. Place and date: At Bull Run, Va., August 30, 1862. Entered service at: ------. Birth: Philadelphia, Pa. Date of issue: September 17, 1897.

Citation:

The flag of his regiment having been abandoned during retreat, he voluntarily returned with a single companion under a heavy fire and secured and brought off the flag, his companion being killed.

== See also ==
- List of Medal of Honor recipients
- List of American Civil War Medal of Honor recipients: A–F
