= 6th New Jersey Infantry Regiment =

- Active: August 1861 – October 1864
- Country: United States
- Allegiance: Union
- Branch: United States Army; Union Army
- Type: Infantry
- Engagements: American Civil War

The 6th New Jersey Infantry Regiment (also called the "6th New Jersey Volunteers") was regiment of infantry from New Jersey that served in the Army of the Potomac during the American Civil War.

== Service ==
The 6th New Jersey Infantry Regiment was recruited in the counties of Burlington, Camden, Mercer, Hudson and Hunterdon, and was mustered into Federal service in August 1861. A good part of the men who made up the unit had previous field experience in the 4th New Jersey Militia, a three-month enlistment regiment that was disbanded in July 1861 (Company F, for example, was largely made up of men who served in the 4th NJ Militia's Company K). During its field service fighting against the Confederates, it took part in a number of engagements, such as the Battle of Williamsburg, the Battle of Chancellorsville, the Battle of Gettysburg, and the Battle of the Wilderness. On September 13, 1861, the Sixth was brigaded with the 55th New York, Gardes Lafayette, the 62d New York, Anderson Zouaves and the 102nd Pennsylvania (the Old 13th Pittsburgh Washington Infantry), under the command of General John J. Peck. However, the 6th was soon removed and placed in the "Second New Jersey Brigade" along with the 5th New Jersey Volunteer Infantry, the 7th New Jersey Volunteer Infantry, and the 8th New Jersey Volunteer Infantry. Despite its beginnings as an all-New Jersey unit, regiments from other states were eventually added to the brigade, starting in 1863. It fought as part of the Army of the Potomac's III Corps until the corps was disbanded in March 1864. From that point until its muster out it was part of the II Corps.

In September 1864, the original enlistments of the unit expired by law, and the men who served a full three years were mustered out of service. Men of the 6th New Jersey who had re-enlisted or were recruited after the regiment was formed were folded into the 8th New Jersey Volunteer Infantry, with whom they served for the duration of the war.

== Commanders ==
Three officers served as Colonel of the regiment:

- James T. Hatfield, who resigned his commission on April 27, 1862.
- Gershom Mott, who was promoted to Brigadier General on September 7, 1862,
- George C. Burling, who resigned March 4, 1864, and was brevetted Brigadier General, US Volunteers on March 13, 1865.

While Colonel Burling was in brigade command, and after he resigned, the unit was led by Lieutenant Colonel Stephen Rose Gilkyson.

== Original Field & Staff officers ==
Mustered in at the end of August/beginning of September 1861 -

- Colonel James T. Hatfield
- Lieutenant Colonel Simpson R. Stroud
- Major John P. Van Leer
- Adjutant Leonard J. Gordon
- Quartermaster Joseph Woodward
- Surgeon John Wiley
- Assistant Surgeon Redfield Sharp
- Chaplain Samuel T. Moore
- Sergeant Major Charles Merriam

Of the men who made up the 6th New Jersey's initial leadership, only Surgeon Wiley and Chaplain Moore would still serve in their duties when their three-year enlistments expired in September 1864. Colonel Hatfield resigned due to "disability" just prior to the 1862 Peninsular Campaign. Lieutenant Colonel Simpson Stroud died of disease in Camden, New Jersey, in November 1861, never seeing any field service. Major John P. Van Leer would be promoted to Lieutenant Colonel to replace Stroud, and was killed in action at the Battle of Williamsburg (briefly leading the regiment before his demise). Adjutant Gordon resigned in January 1862 (his replacement, Lieutenant Aaron Wilkes of Company B, was also killed at the Battle of Williamsburg). Quartermaster Woodward resigned due to disability in April 1863. Assistant Surgeon Sharp was promoted to Surgeon of the 15th New Jersey Volunteer Infantry in July 1862. While Chaplain Moore continued to serve with the 8th New Jersey Volunteer Infantry after September 1864, Surgeon Wiley chose to not re-enlist after three full years, and was honorably mustered out. Sergeant Major Merriam was promoted to 1st Lieutenant of Company H before he resigned in January 1863.

== Casualties ==
According to the 1876 published work Record of Officers and Men of New Jersey in the Civil War by William S. Stryker (a Civil War veteran who was serving as New Jersey's Adjutant General at the time), a total of 1,434 men were listed as having served in the 6th New Jersey. Through its service in the field, the regiment lost 4 officers and 176 men killed, mortally wounded or died of disease, for a total of 180. However, Dyer's Compendium puts the number at 3 Officers and 124 Enlisted men killed and mortally wounded and 1 Officer and 71 Enlisted men by disease, for a total 199.

== Monuments and awards ==
A monument to the 6th New Jersey Infantry stands in the "Valley of Death" near Devil's Den in the Gettysburg National Military Park. It marks the general area where the unit fought on the second day (July 2, 1863) of the Battle of Gettysburg. In that engagement, the regiment was commanded by Lieutenant Colonel Gilkyson.

Sergeant Richard Conner of Company F was awarded the Medal of Honor for his bravery while rescuing the flag of his regiment during the Second Battle of Bull Run in August 1862.

== See also ==
- List of New Jersey Civil War Units
