= Van Lear =

Van Lear may refer to:

== Places ==
- Van Lear, Kentucky
- Van Lear, Maryland
- Vanleer, Tennessee

== People ==
- Phillip Edward Van Lear, American actor
- Thomas Van Lear (1864–1931), mayor of Minneapolis, Minnesota
- Van Lear Black (1875–1930), American publisher and civil aviation pioneer

== See also ==
- Van Laer
- Van Leer (disambiguation)
- Van Lier
- Vanleer
