= Broadview VanLeer Mansion =

Historic house in Illinois, United States

- Margaret and Bird Van Leer; Vanleer Mansion
- U.S. National Register of Historic Places
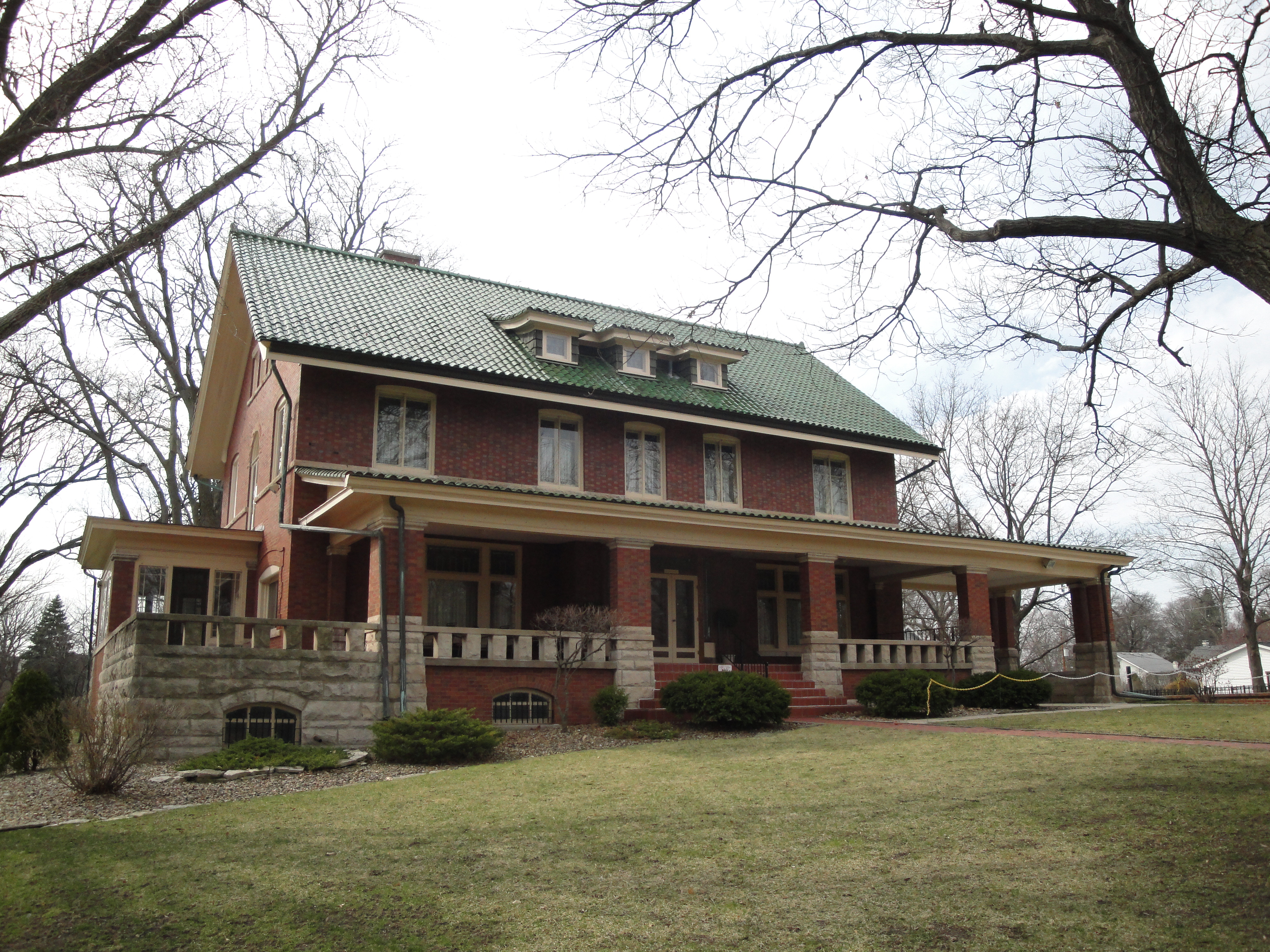
- Broadview Van Leer Mansion in 2011

- Location within Illinois Location within the United States
- Interactive map showing the location of Broadview Vanleer Mansion
- Location: 1301 S. Fell Avenue; Normal, Illinois
- Coordinates: 40°29′49″N 88°59′14″W
- Built: 1906
- Architectural style: Edwardian
- NRHP reference No.: 16000327
- Added to NRHP: June 7, 2016

Broadview Mansion (a.k.a. The Van Leer Mansion), is a twenty-two room Edwardian style mansion located in Normal, Illinois, near Illinois Wesleyan University. The three-story estate, originally situated on five acres of land, was built in 1906 for Bird Calladay and Margaret VanLeer. The mansion was formerly known as the VanLeer mansion. It is currently owned and operated by the Immanuel Bible Foundation.

== VanLeer Family ==
Bird Calladay VanLeer, born in 1867 in Downingtown, Pennsylvania, was the son of William Archer Van Leer and Josephine Calladay VanLeer and a member of the Van Leer family. While Bird was young, his family moved to Maroa, Illinois, as pioneer farmers. Bird graduated from Maroa High School and attended Illinois Wesleyan University. He left Illinois Wesleyan University before graduation to help support his family. Margaret Diadem Langstaff VanLeer was born in 1870 in Lexington, Illinois, to John and Isabelle Powell Langstaff. Upon graduation from Lexington High School, she enrolled in Northwestern University's School of Oration. She later taught at Illinois Wesleyan University, where she met Bird through a mutual friend. Bird and Margaret were married in July 1894. Bird died in 1933 and Margaret followed in 1949.

== Mansion and Carillon ==
Construction on the VanLeer mansion began in 1904 and was completed in 1906. The mansion was dubbed “Broadview” because its situation at the top of a hill afforded a “broad view” of the surrounding countryside. The most striking feature of the mansion is the 110-foot (34 m)-tall carillon, located in the gardens. Built in 1940 under the direction of Margaret Van Leer in the North Italian Romanesque style, the bell tower slopes gently from 23 square feet (2.1 m^{2}) at its base to 21 square feet (2.0 m^{2}) at the top of the masonry. A spiral staircase winds its way to the copper cupola, which originally housed ten bells, made and installed by the Meenly Bell Company of Troy, New York. The largest of the bells weighed over 2000 pounds and bore the following inscription, “Dedicated to the Glory of God and in loving memory of Bird Colladay VanLeer by his wife Margaret Langstaff VanLeer." The bells were suspended from a steel frame, and the bell clappers were attached to a hand-ringing console. Players would operate the bells by pushing on wooden rods. A book of bell music was available, arranged specifically for the narrow range of ten tones. The bells were played twice daily from 1941 until 1983. Over time, the bells have been sold or traded.

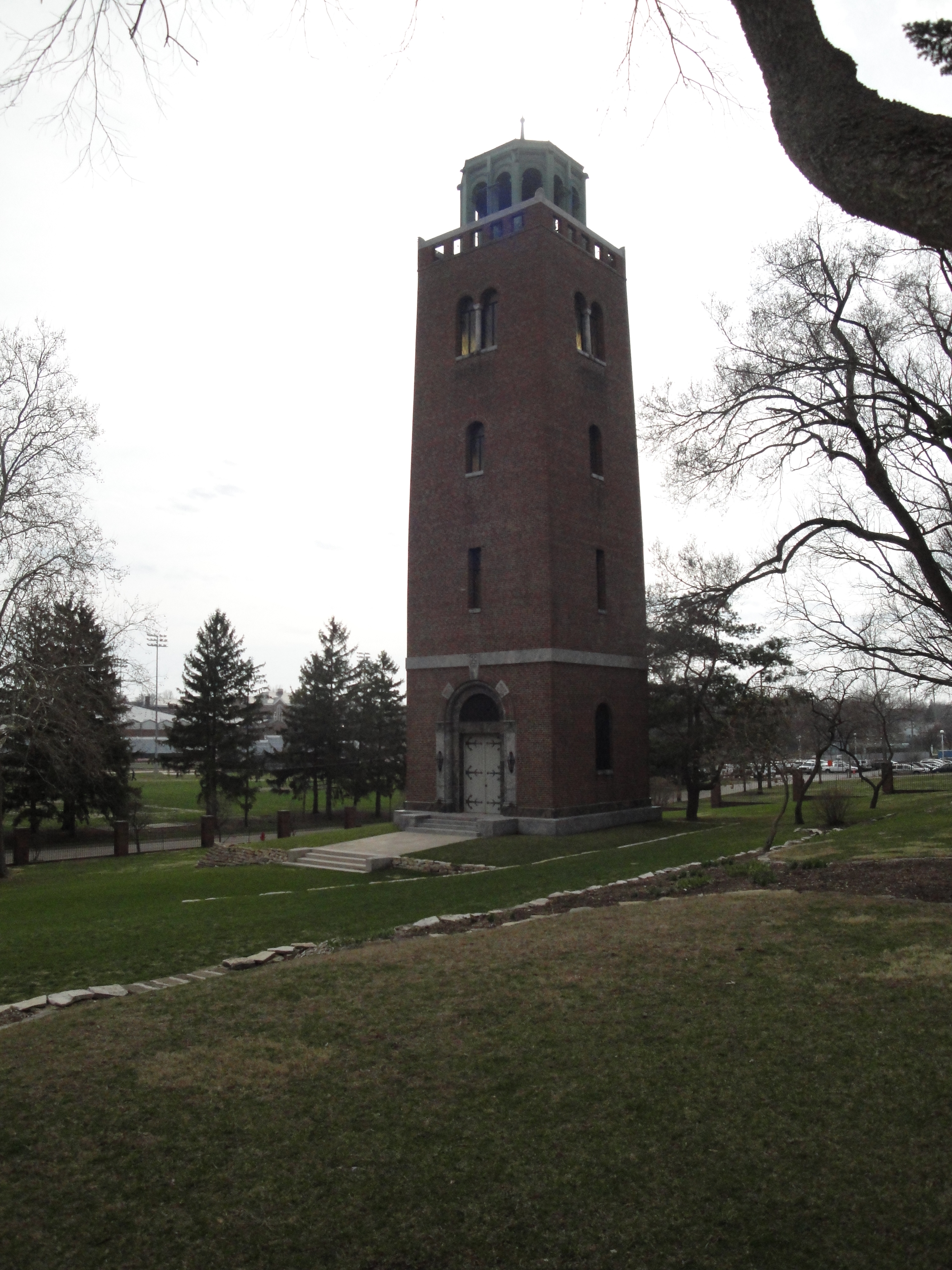
VanLeer Memorial Chime Tower at Broadview Mansion in Normal, Illinois.

== Immanuel Bible Foundation ==
The VanLeers first conceived of the Immanuel Bible Foundation in 1921. Devout Christians, the childless VanLeers bequeathed their entire estate to the Foundation. Established in 1944 by Margaret VanLeer, the Immanuel Bible Foundation is a non-profit, non-denominational Christian resource center that assists local churches and organizations by providing Bible classes, fostering cooperation among Christians, and encouraging the performance of sacred music. The Foundation houses a music lending library for small churches, containing over 100,000 copies of music. The Immanuel Bible Foundation continues to serve the Bloomington-Normal community by providing space for retreats, meetings, and music lessons. The Foundation also rents out the mansion and its grounds for weddings.

== See also ==
- National Register of Historic Places listings in McLean County, Illinois
