= David Van Leer =

David Van Leer (December 26, 1949 – April 3, 2013) was an award winning American educator and LGBT cultural studies researcher.

== Early life ==
David Mark Van Leer was born December 26, 1949, in Rockville Centre, New York, and is a member of the Van Leer Family.

He graduated from Cornell University, Ph.D. 1978, M.A. 1974 and A.B. 1971. He was a recipient of a Donald Stauffer Preceptorship. He obtained fellowships from the American Council of Learned Societies, the California Arts Council, and three from the National Endowment for the Humanities.

== Career ==
Van Leer taught at Cornell University and Princeton University, and in 1986 he became Assistant Professor at University of California at Davis and retired as a tenured professor.

In 2007 he received the Academic Senate Award for Distinguished Undergraduate Teaching.

He provided articles to magazines like The New Republic and The Times Literary Supplement. His research field was cultural studies, with emphases in lesbian and gay studies, film studies, and multi-ethnic discourse.

Other research fields were American cultural and intellectual history 1600-1900, philosophy, literature, and popular American culture from World War I to the present.

He served on the Board of Editors of American Quarterly and on the Advisory Board for the Graduate Record Examinations Subject Exam in Literature (ETS).

He was a book review editor for the Journal of Bisexuality.

He received a UC Chancellor’s Citation for Diversity, and Deems Taylor Prize in Music Criticism, and Academic Senate Award for Distinguished Undergraduate Teaching. Van Leer was also praised by students and the majority of the Davis community for his contributions.

== Personal life ==
Van Leer had a long-time spouse who he referred to as his partner Robert Miles Parker. Parker was the founder of Save Our Heritage Organisation. While teaching in California, Van Leer traveled periodically to New York City where Parker was living. Van Leer was known to be a fine pianist and conductor, frequently conducting the “Grand Symphonious Orchestra” in Gilbert and Sullivan.

After retirement Van Leer moved permanently to New York City. He died on April 3, 2013.

== Works ==
- Emerson’s Epistemology: The Argument of the Essays (Cambridge: Cambridge University Press, 1986).
- The Queening of America: Gay Culture in Straight Society (New York: Routledge, 1995).
- Ed. Edgar Allan Poe: Selected Tales, World’s Classics Series (Oxford: Oxford University Press, 1998).
- View from the Closet: Reconcilable Differences in Douglass and Melville. Samuel Otter and Robert Levine, eds., Frederick Douglass and Herman Melville: Essays in Relation (2007)
- Lesbian and Gay Theory / Queer Theory. Modern North American Criticism and Theory, ed. Julian Wolfreys (Edinburgh: Edinburgh University Press, 2006).
- Poe’s Cosmology: The World of the Mind. POEtic Effect and Cultural Discourses, ed. Hermann Josef Schnarkertz. (Universitätsverlag WINTER Heidelberg, 2003): 189-207
- Frank and Jim Go Boating: Henry James and the French New Wave, Henry James on the Stage and Screen, ed. John R Bradley. (Houndmills, Basingstoke, and New York: Palgrave / St Martin’s Press, 2000), pp. 84–102.
- A World of Female Friendship: The Bostonians, Henry James and Homo-Erotic Desire, ed. John R Bradley (London and New York: Macmillan Press, St Martin’s Press, 1999): 93-109.
- Foucault in Gay America: Sexuality at Plymouth Plantation, Cultural History After Foucault, ed. John Neubauer, (New York: Aldine de Gruyter, 1999), pp. 209–219. Reprint of previous essay.
- What Lola Got: Cultural Carelessness on Broadway. The Other Fifties: Interrogating Midcentury American Icons, ed. Joel Foreman (Urbana: University of Illinois Press, 1997), pp. 171–96.
- Visible Silence: Spectatorship in Black Gay and Lesbian Film. Representing Blackness: Issues in Film and Video, ed. Valerie Smith (New Brunswick, N.J.: Rutgers University Press, 1997), pp. 157–81.
- The Beast of the Closet: Homosociality and the Pathology of Manhood, Critical Inquiry 15 (1989): 587-605.
- Trust and Trade: A Response to Eve Sedgwick, Critical Inquiry 15 (Summer 1989): 758-63.
- Detecting Truth: The World of the Dupin Tales (1993)
- Hester's Labyrinth: Transcendental Rhetoric in Puritan Bostons (1985)
