= Van Leer Packaging =

Royal Packaging Industries Van Leer N.V
- Type: Subsidiary of Huhtamäki
- Industry: industrial-and-consumer packaging
- Founded: 1919; 107 years ago
- Headquarters: Amsterdam
- Key people: Bernard van Leer, CEO

Van Leer Packaging is a packaging company which had 17,000 employees and generated more than 2 billion in sales globally. In May 1999, Royal Packaging Industries Van Leer N.V was acquired by rival Huhtamäki.

== History ==
Van Leer Packaging was founded in 1919 by Bernard van Leer. Working in post World War I, Bernard started a small factory outside of Amsterdam. Van Leer Packaging then expanded into the industrial packaging field and received its first breakthrough in 1925 for a large steel drum order from the Shell Oil Company. By 1997 it is reported to have generated over $4.75 billion and post steady profit growth. In 1999, Huhtamäki acquired Van Leer Packaging for about $1 billion (~$1.77 billion in 2024).

== Van Leer Group Foundation ==
After the acquisition of Royal Packaging Industries Van Leer, The Van Leer Group created the Bernard Van Leer Foundation, which funds the Jerusalem Film Centre and the Van Leer Jerusalem Institute.

== See also ==
- List of largest companies of the Netherlands
