= Lima, Pennsylvania =

Unincorporated community in Pennsylvania, US

- Census-designated place
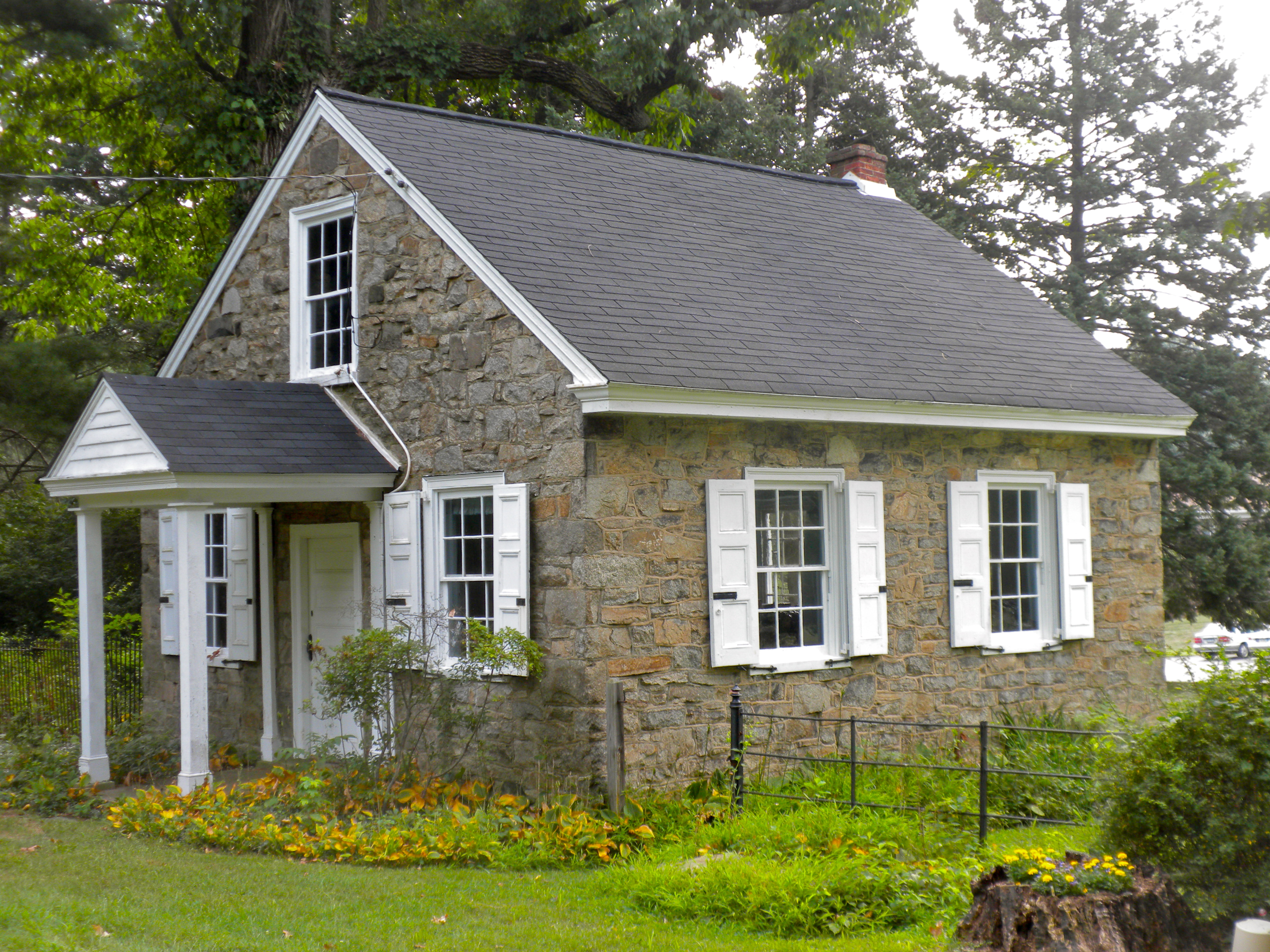
- Middletown Friends School

- Location in Delaware County and the U.S. state of Pennsylvania
- Coordinates: 39°54′59″N 75°26′31″W
- Country: United States
- State: Pennsylvania
- County: Delaware
- Township: Middletown

Area
  - Total: 1.47 sq mi (3.81 km^{2})
  - Land: 1.47 sq mi (3.81 km^{2})
  - Water: 0 sq mi (0.00 km^{2})
- Elevation: 348 ft (106 m)

Population (2020)
  - Total: 2,745
  - Density: 1,867.9/sq mi (721.19/km^{2})
- Time zone: UTC-5 (EST)
  - Summer (DST): UTC-4 (EDT)
- ZIP code: 19037
- Area codes: 610 and 484
- FIPS code: 42-43272
- GNIS feature ID: 1179346

Lima (/ˈlaɪmə/, LY-mə) is an unincorporated community and census-designated place (CDP) in Middletown Township, Delaware County, Pennsylvania, United States. The population was 2,735 at the 2010 census, down from 3,225 at the 2000 census.

== History ==
The Middletown Friends Meetinghouse was built in 1702 and is one of the oldest Friends meetinghouses in what was originally Chester County. Lima played an important role in the anti-slavery movement. Not only did residents advocate for manumission, noted local families such as the Van Leers and Foxes bought and sold lots to free black tradesmen or only to people who were supportive of the free black community. The location was known as The Village of Lima and is now known as Van Leer Avenue. The local community grew with support from local neighbors.

The John J. Tyler Arboretum was listed on the National Register of Historic Places in 2003.

== Geography ==
Lima is located in northern Middletown Township at 39°54′59″N 75°26′31″W (39.916523, -75.441902). It is 3 miles (5 km) west of Media, the Delaware County seat. U.S. Route 1 (Baltimore Pike) forms the southern edge of the CDP and leads northeastward 16 miles (26 km) into Philadelphia.

According to the United States Census Bureau, the Lima CDP has a total area of 1.5 square miles (3.8 km^{2}), all land. It has a hot-summer humid continental climate and average monthly temperatures in the village centre range from 31.7 °F in January to 76.5 °F in July. The local hardiness zone is 7a.

== Demographics ==
Historical population
Census	Pop.	Note	%±
2020	2,745		—
U.S. Decennial Census

As of the census of 2000, there were 3,225 people, 978 households, and 400 families residing in the CDP. The population density was 2,221.7 inhabitants per square mile (857.8/km^{2}). There were 1,003 housing units at an average density of 691.0 per square mile (266.8/km^{2}). The racial makeup of the CDP was 94.23% White, 4.53% African American, 0.03% Native American, 0.99% Asian, and 0.22% from two or more races. Hispanic or Latino of any race were 0.31% of the population.

There were 978 households, out of which 10.9% had children under the age of 18 living with them, 34.4% were married couples living together, 5.2% had a female householder with no husband present, and 59.0% were non-families. 57.5% of all households were made up of individuals, and 52.4% had someone living alone who was 65 years of age or older. The average household size was 1.69 and the average family size was 2.63.

In the CDP, the population was spread out, with 8.1% under the age of 18, 1.6% from 18 to 24, 8.0% from 25 to 44, 11.3% from 45 to 64, and 71.1% who were 65 years of age or older. The median age was 79 years. For every 100 females, there were 48.9 males. For every 100 females age 18 and over, there were 43.8 males.

The median income for a household in the CDP was $45,948, and the median income for a family was $65,875. Males had a median income of $49,750 versus $40,804 for females. The per capita income for the CDP was $24,908. About 1.6% of families and 4.7% of the population were below the poverty line, including none of those under age 18 and 4.1% of those age 65 or over.

== Notable people ==
- Holly Witt, Playboy Playmate, Miss November 1995
- John P. Van Leer, Anti-Slavery Movement member and colonel in the Civil War
