= VanLeer Polk =

American journalist, politician and diplomat

- Born: Anthony Van Leer Polk; July 9, 1856; Ashwood, Tennessee
- Died: December 19, 1907 (aged 51); Memphis, Tennessee
- Burial place: Mount Olivet Cemetery; Nashville, Tennessee
- Education: Rugby School
- Occupations: Journalist, politician, diplomat
- Parent(s): Andrew Jackson Polk; Rebecca Van Leer
- Relatives: William Polk (paternal grandfather); Antoinette Polk (sister)

VanLeer Polk (a.k.a. Van Leer Polk) (July 9, 1856 - December 19, 1907) was an American journalist, politician and diplomat from Tennessee. He served in the Tennessee Senate as a representative for Maury and Lewis Counties from 1891 to 1893. He was appointed Consul-General in Calcutta, India, and was one of six representatives of the United States at the 1906 Pan-American Conference. He was a member of the influential Van Leer family.

== Early life ==
Anthony Van Leer Polk was born at Ashwood Hall in Ashwood, Maury County, Tennessee, on July 9, 1856. He attended Sillig's School in Vevey, Switzerland and Rugby School in Rugby, England. His father, Andrew Jackson Polk, was the son of Colonel William Polk. His mother, Rebecca Van Leer, was an heiress from the Van Leer family to an iron fortune from Cumberland Furnace.

== Career ==
Polk was admitted to the bar, but worked as a journalist. He founded and operated Polk's Weekly in Nashville, Tennessee. He also worked as an editor for the Nashville Daily News.

Polk invested in silver mining operations in Mexico along with Tennessee politicians Duncan Brown Cooper and Henry Cooper.

In 1883, a committee of the Tennessee State Senate discovered a $400,000 (~$11.4 million in 2024) deficit in their accounting with funds being misappropriated by Polk's cousin, M.T. Polk. Polk and his cousin were apprehended by detectives in San Antonio, Texas but were released possibly due to the acceptance of a bribe and headed for Mexico. U.S. Marshals arrested Polk's cousin 18 miles from the Mexico border and he was returned to Tennessee and found guilty of embezzlement.

Polk was a member of the Democratic Party. He was elected to represent Maury and Lewis Counties in the Tennessee Senate in 1890, serving from 1891 to 1893. With Flournoy Rivers, a state senator for Giles and Lincoln Counties, he introduced railroad commission bills.

Polk was appointed as Consul-General to Calcutta, India by President Grover Cleveland in August 1893. In 1906, he was appointed as one of six United States commissioners to the Pan-American Conference in Rio de Janeiro, Brazil by President Theodore Roosevelt.

Later in life, he worked as editor of the Weekly News and Scimitar newspaper in Memphis, Tennessee.

== Personal life ==
He married Dorothy Kitchen Bodine in New York City on February 20, 1907. He died on December 19, 1907, in Memphis, Tennessee. Polk was interred at Mount Olivet Cemetery in Nashville.
