= Van Leer Cabin =

Historic house in Pennsylvania, United States

- U.S. National Register of Historic Places
- Location within Pennsylvania Location within the United States
- Location: Tredyffrin Township, Pennsylvania
- Coordinates: 40°03′48″N 75°22′14″W
- Area: 6.8 acres (2.8 ha)
- Built: c. 1759
- Architect: Van Leer Family
- Architectural style: German Log Cabin
- NRHP reference No.: 83002227

Van Leer Cabin, is a historic cabin and one of the last historical dwellings in Tredyffrin Township, Pennsylvania. It still stands on the grounds of Conestoga High School.

== History ==
The original structure belonged to several homes owned by the Van Leer family who immigrated from Prussia in 1759. Dr. Bernardhus Van Leer a well known doctor bought 109 acres at the location of the Cabin the same year. Dr. Bernardhus Van Leer is considered notable for traveling on horseback until the age of 102, and being one of the first medical doctors in New York. Dr. Van Leer's son Captain Samuel Van Leer and family would later play an important role in American history as a revolutionary war soldier. Van Leers were noted in the anti-slavery cause and built nearby free negro communities for newly freed slaves. Van Leer's also financially supported the Underground Railroad. This Cabin is listed as an underground railroad site.

In the mid-1960s students and volunteers helped restore the cabin, located on Conestoga High School. The Cabin is also utilized as part of an American History Course.

== Architecture ==
In the Pennsylvania colony, log cabins play a significant part of architectural history. The Van Leer Cabin appears to follow the German type, where logs are set tightly together and even at the corners.

== See also ==
- Van Leer House
- Van Leer Pleasant Hill Plantation
- Mortonson-Van Leer Log Cabin
- Bernardhus Van Leer
