= Mortonson–Van Leer Log Cabin =

Historic log cabin in New Jersey, U.S.

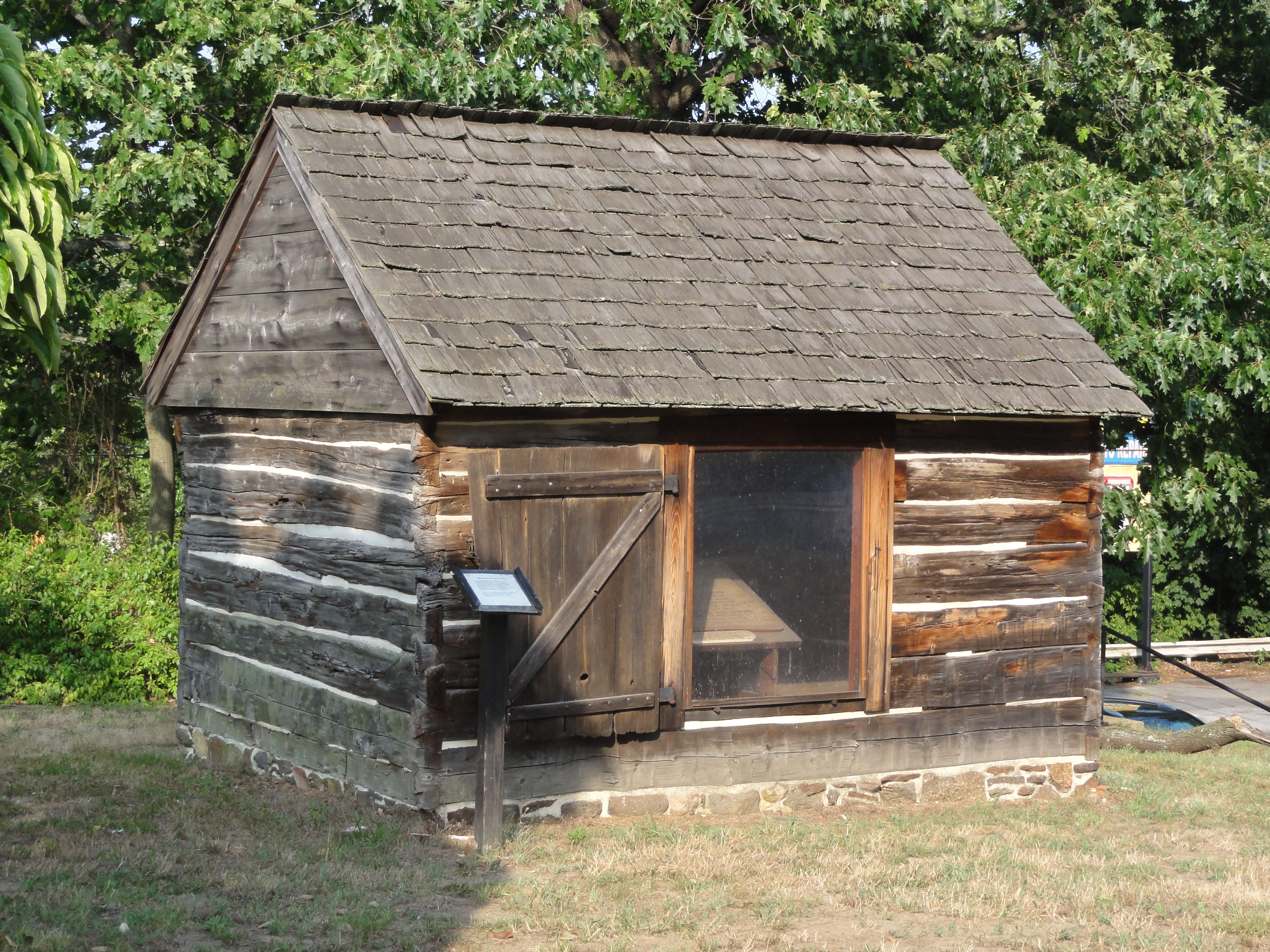
- Mortonson–Van Leer Log Cabin in July 2012

General information
- Architectural style: Swedish Log Cabin
- Location: Swedesboro, New Jersey, U.S.
- Coordinates: 39°44′58″N 75°18′25″W
- Completed: c. 1654
- Governing body: Gloucester County Historical Society

Mortonson–Van Leer Log Cabin, also known as Schorn Log Cabin, is a historic cabin and one of the last historical dwellings in Swedesboro, New Jersey, United States. It stands on the grounds of the cemetery of the Trinity Church. It is one of the oldest original log cabins of early Swedish-Finnish architecture in the United States.

== History ==
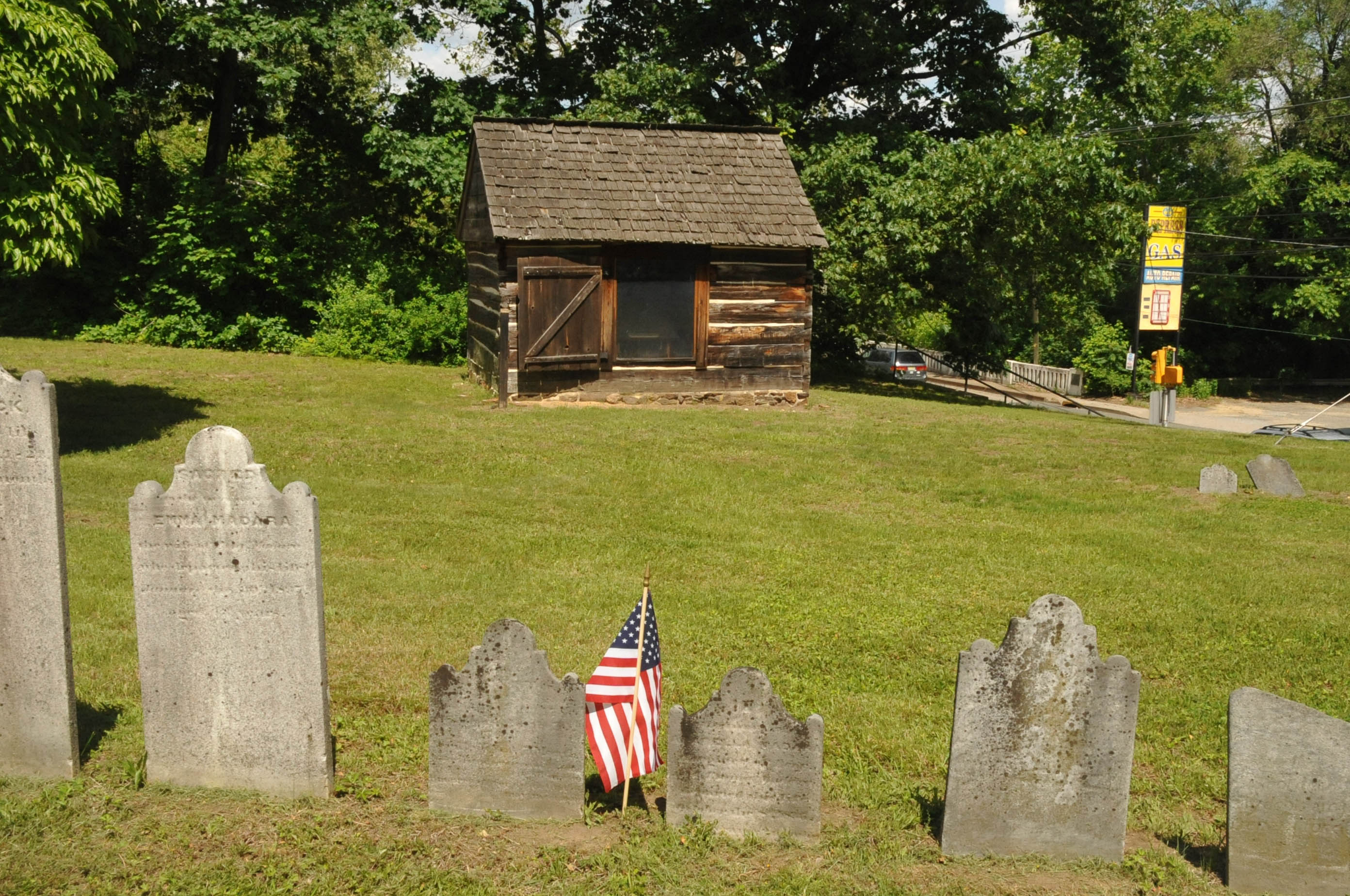
Mortonson–Van Leer Log Cabin seen from the nearby cemetery

=== 17th century ===
The Mortonson–Van Leer Log Cabin was originally built along the north bank of the Raccoon Creek by Morton Mortenson, a Swedish-Finnish man who arrived in the Delaware Valley, at that time part of the colony of New Sweden, in May 1654. Mortenson's great-grandson, John Morton, would go on to sign the Declaration of Independence as a Pennsylvania delegate. The cabin consists of one small room with no windows and a single door and its walls are made of cedar logs and lime mortar caulk.

The cabin was owned by a local Bernardhus Van Leer, a notable physician, and later by the Van Leer family, who were noted in the anti-slavery cause.

Prior to and during the American Civil War, the Van Leer family used the Log Cabin as a station for the Underground Railroad to help slaves escape to free negro communities.

The Van Leers also built nearby villages for freed slaves and financially supported the Underground Railroad. The cabin had strong ties to Quakers and Episcopalian communities at the time.

The cabin is recorded as a friendly trading post for Native Americans.

Originally located along Raccoon Creek, the cabin was donated to Gloucester County Historical Society by the Schorn family. In 1989, the cabin was relocated modestly, so that is now based behind the cemetery at Trinity Episcopal Church in Swedesboro.

Mortenson also owned property on the other side of the Delaware River along Darby Creek.

== Architecture ==
The cabin is an example of the typical Swedish-Finnish cabin architecture, utilizing notched logs which overlapped corners, brought to the area upon the settlement of the New Sweden Colony.

== See also ==
- List of the oldest buildings in New Jersey
- John Morton
- Morton Homestead
- New Sweden Farmstead Museum
- Van Leer Cabin
