= Barnardus Van Leer House =

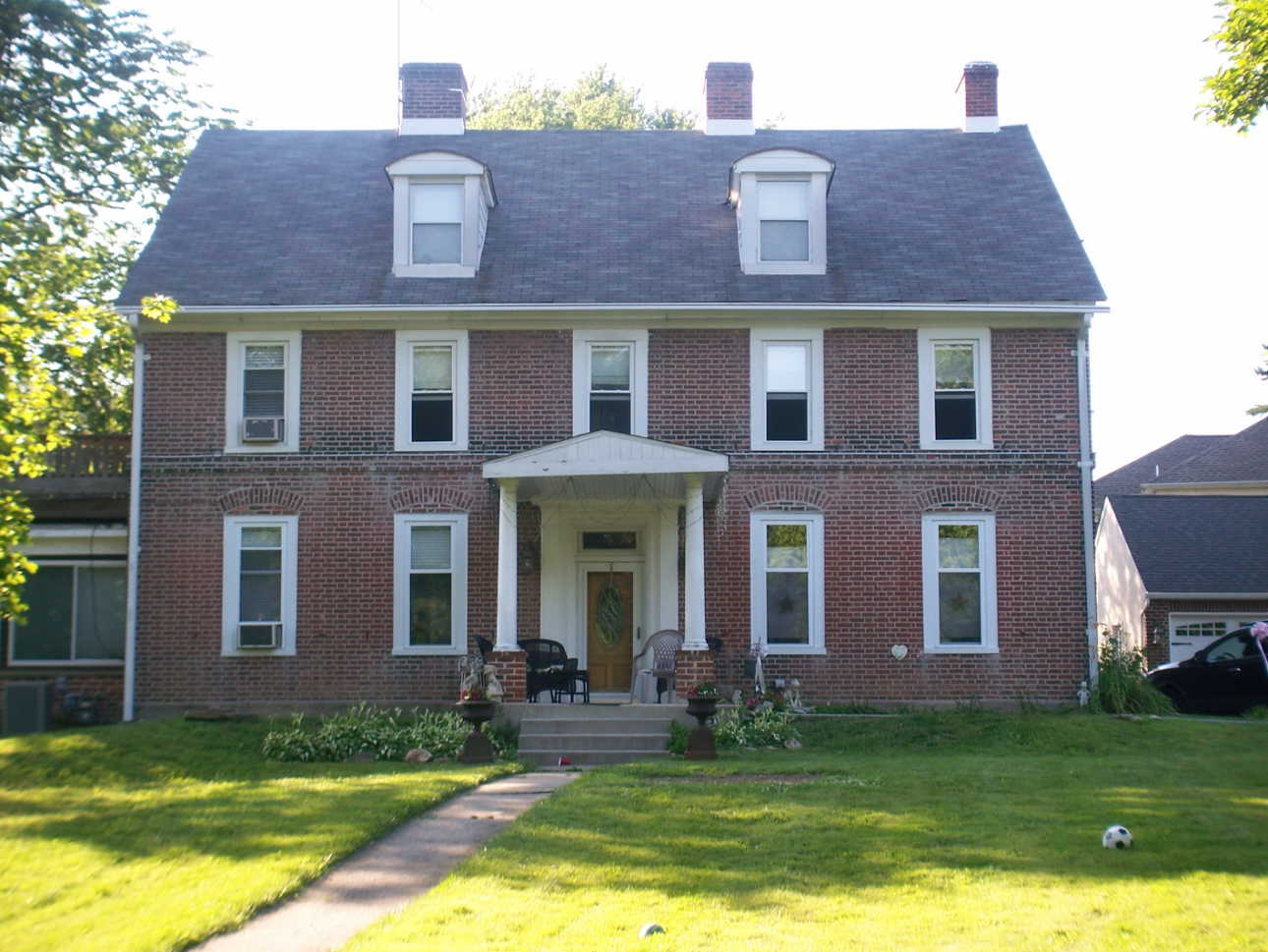
- Dr. Van Leer's historical house

General information
- Location: Marple Township
- Coordinates: 39°57′51″N 75°21′41″W
- Estimated completion: 1742

Design and construction
- Architect: Van Leer Family

The Barnardus Van Leer House, is an historic house in the colonial style. Built for Dr. Bernardhus Van Leer, it is one of the last historical dwellings in Marple Township, Pennsylvania.

== History ==
The original structure belonged to an estate owned by the Van Leer family who immigrated from Germany in 1698. The land passed to the Van Leer family in 1720 or 1721, and Dr. Bernardhus Van Leer built the house with the help of his father-in-law, ironmaster William Branson, in c. 1742. According to local historian Lucy Simler it was sometimes called the Black Mansion or the Van Leer mansion; she reported that it had been speculated that it was built on the site of or taken material from an earlier building on the site built by the Stanfield family.

A nearby log cabin, located on Conestoga High School, was also owned by the Van Leer family and used as an Underground Railroad station.
