= Samuel Van Leer =

American Revolutionary War officer (1747–1825)

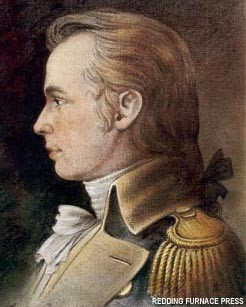

Captain in American Revolutionary War

Personal details
- Born: January 7, 1747 Marple Township, Province of Pennsylvania, British America
- Died: October 15, 1825 (aged 78) East Nantmeal, Pennsylvania, U.S.
- Resting place: St. Mary's Episcopal Church, Elverson, Pennsylvania, U.S.
- Spouse: Hannah Wayne
- Children: 8
- Relatives: Bernardhus Van Leer (father); Isaac Van Leer (son); Isaac Wayne (father in-law); Anthony Wayne (brother in-law); Samuel Templin (son in-law); Florence Van Leer Earle (granddaughter); George Earle II (grandson)
- Occupation: Ironmaster
- Nickname: Capt Samuel

Military service
- Allegiance: United States of America
- Branch/service: Continental Army; U.S. Army
- Years of service: 1777–1781
- Rank: Captain 1775–1781; Lieutenant 1780–1781
- Commands: Seventh Company, Fifth Battalion, Chester County Militia; Chester County Light Horse Volunteers
- Battles/wars: American Revolutionary War; Battle of Brandywine; Battle of Paoli; Battle of Germantown

Captain Samuel Van Leer (January 7, 1747 – October 15, 1825) was a military officer from Pennsylvania who served as a captain in the Continental Army during the American Revolutionary War and as a lieutenant in the Chester County Light Horse Volunteers from 1781 to 1785. After his retirement from the military, he owned the Reading Furnace ironworks.

He was a member of the influential Van Leer family. His father Bernardhus Van Leer was an early settler of the Province of Pennsylvania. He married the sister of American Revolutionary War General Anthony Wayne. His son Isaac Van Leer was a U.S. Congressman.

== Early life ==
Van Leer was born in 1747 in Marple Township, Province of Pennsylvania, British America to Mary (Branson) and Bernardhus Van Leer. His maternal grandfather is William Branson who was an ironworks pioneer and owned the historical home Warrenpoint.

In 1770, Samuel married Hannah Wayne, daughter to Isaac Wayne and sister to Anthony Wayne.

== American Revolutionary War ==
Van Leer was commissioned captain of the Seventh Company, Fifth Battalion of the Chester County Militia on May 17, 1777. He fought with Anthony Wayne during the Battle of Paoli, the Battle of Brandywine and the Battle of Germantown. All of his brothers were military officers during the war.

He was a commanding officer in the 4th Battalion 1780 under Lt. Col. John Bartholomew. He served as lieutenant of the Chester County Light Horse Volunteers from 1780 to 1781.

== Later life and death ==
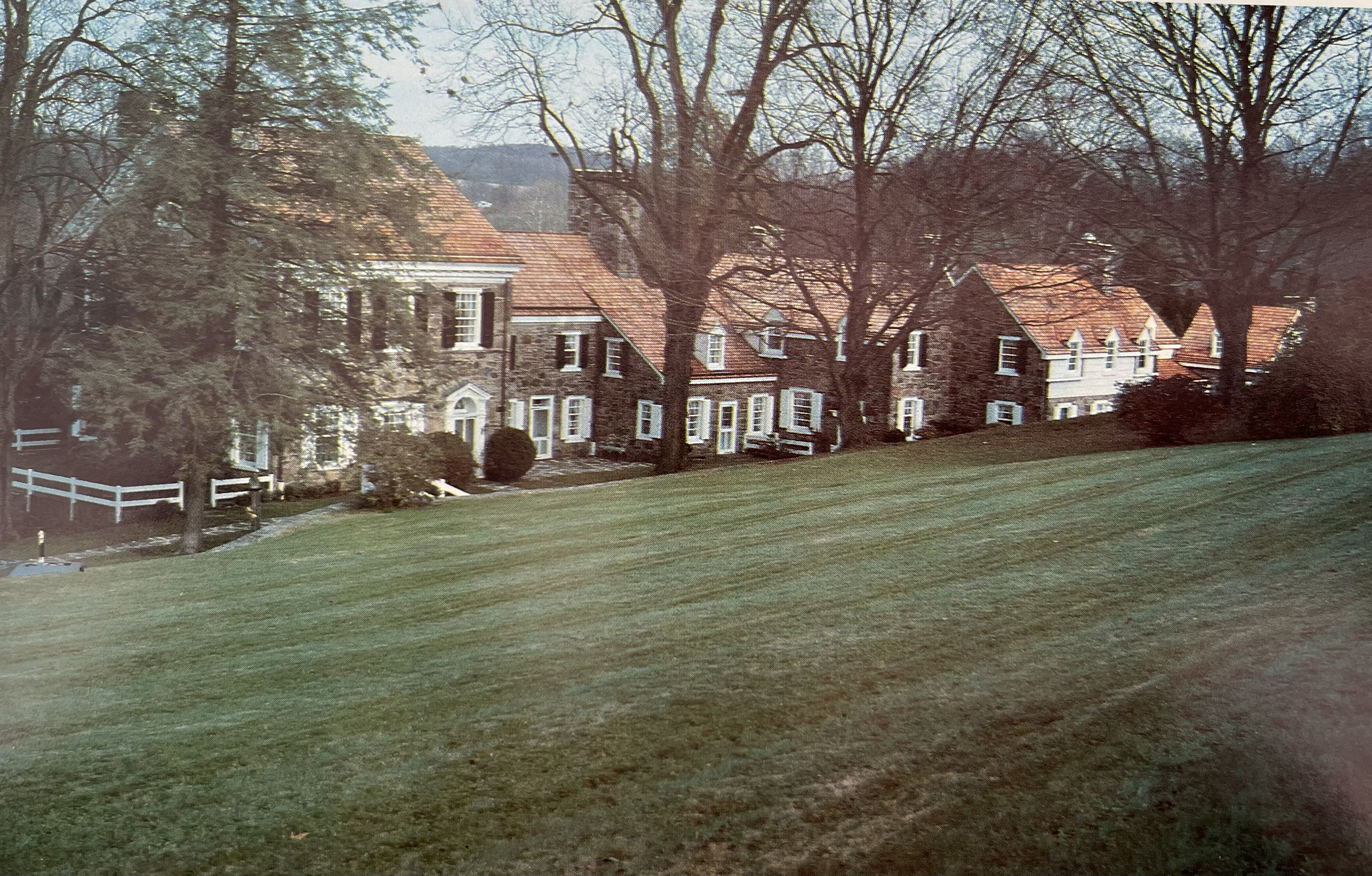
Reading Furnace Mansion

After his retirement from the military, Van Leer went on to grow his Iron business in Reading Furnace, formerly owned by his grandfather William Branson. He lived in the historical mansion on site with his wife Hannah.

He inherited two plantations in East Nantmeal, Pennsylvania, from his brother, Dr. Branson Van Leer, and died there in October, 1825.

== Family ==
Van Leer and his family owned several historic properties including the Van Leer Cabin in Tredyffin Township, Pennsylvania, the Mortonson–Van Leer Log Cabin, an Underground Railroad station in Swedesboro, New Jersey, and the Van Leer Pleasant Hill Plantation in West Nantmeal, Pennsylvania. Van Leer's also supported the free black community known as the Village of Lima.

Samuel had eight children with his wife Hannah. On 10 July 1786, Hannah gave birth to twin girls and died due to birth complications. After her death, Anthony Wayne offered to have Van Leer's children stay with his family. Van Leer declined the offer and kept his children at his home and never remarried.

== See also ==
- Barnardus Van Leer House
