= Bernardhus Van Leer =

American physician

- Born: Bernardhus Van Leer; 1687 near Isenberg, Holy Roman Empire
- Died: January 26, 1790 (104); Marple Township
- Occupation: Physician
- Title: Dr.
- Spouse(s): Mary Branson (1733-1749), Christina Fuls (1750-1790)
- Children: 14
- Parent(s): Johann George Van Leer, Mary Van Leer
- Relatives: Samuel Van Leer (son)

Bernardhus Van Leer (Note: Also spelled Bernhard or Bernhardus, and Vanleer, von Löhr, von Loehr, or von Lähr.) (1687–January 26, 1790) was a German-American early settler of the Province of Pennsylvania. He worked as a physician and was father of American Revolutionary War Captain Samuel Van Leer.

He built the Barnardus Van Leer House in Marple Township, Pennsylvania, c. 1742 and owned the land in Tredyffrin Township, Pennsylvania, on which his son Isaac built the Van Leer Cabin c. 1800.

== Biography ==
Van Leer was born near Isenberg, Germany in the electorate of Hesse to Johann George and Mary van Lohr. He emigrated to the Province of Pennsylvania with his family at age 11 in 1698. During his youth, he was sent back to Europe to be educated as a physician.

As an adult, he traveled to Germany and studied medicine for several years. He returned to Pennsylvania and opened a medical practice in Chester County. Van Leer maintained an exclusive office practice, which was unique for the time.

Van Leer built the Barnardus Van Leer House in Marple Township, Pennsylvania, c. 1742 with assistance from his father in law.

In 1759, Van Leer purchased 109 acres in what is now Treddyffrin Township, Pennsylvania.

== Personal life ==
Van Leer married Mary Branson, the daughter of wealthy merchant, William Branson, who owned the historical Warrenpoint William Branson House and was a leader in the colonial iron industry Together Bernardhus and Mary had five children. Mary died and Van Leer took a second wife and together they had an additional nine children.

Bernardhus' son Samuel Van Leer served as a military officer for the Continental Army during the American Revolutionary War. His other son Benjamin Van Leer became a prominent doctor in Philadelphia.

He was known locally as "the centenarian". He kept his health well into his later years and was known to travel 30 miles by horseback between his properties even at the age of 100. He was beaten by burglars in his home at the age of 102 and never fully recovered from his injuries. He died on January 26, 1790, at the age of 104.

== Legacy ==
After Bernardhus's death, his son Isaac built the Van Leer Cabin on the Tredyffrin property that had been deeded to him.

== See also ==
- Van Leer Family
