= Thomas Earle (American politician) =

American lawyer

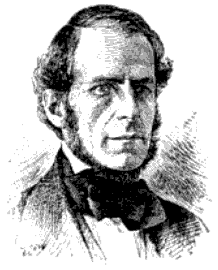
- Born: April 21, 1796; Leicester, Massachusetts
- Died: July 14, 1849 (aged 53); Willow Grove, Pennsylvania
- Occupations: Journalist, lawyer, politician
- Political party: Democratic
- Spouse: Mary Hussey (m. 1820)
- Children: 5, including George H. Earle, Sr. and Caroline Earle White
- Father: Pliny Earle I

Thomas Earle (April 21, 1796 – July 14, 1849) was an American journalist, lawyer, and politician. The son of Pliny Earle, he was born in Leicester, Massachusetts, the descendant of Ralph Earle, one of the original petitioners of King Charles I to found the state of Rhode Island. His son was a Philadelphia lawyer George H. Earle, Sr. His grandson, born after his death, was noted "financial diplomat" George H. Earle, Jr. His great-grandson was George Howard Earle III, governor of Pennsylvania.

== Biography ==
Thomas Earle was born in Leicester, Massachusetts in 1796, the son of Patience (Buffum) and Pliny Earle I. He was educated at Leicester academy. In 1817 he moved to Philadelphia, where he engaged in mercantile pursuits for a few years, but subsequently studied law and practiced his profession. He became distinguished also as a journalist, editing in succession the Columbian Observer, Standard, Pennsylvanian, Pennsylvania Freeman, and Mechanics' Free Press and Reform Advocate. In 1837 he took an active part in calling the Constitutional convention of Pennsylvania, of which he was a prominent member, and it is supposed that he made the original draft of the new constitution. He lost his popularity with the Democratic Party by advocating the extension of the right of suffrage to African Americans.

He was a candidate for vice president in the 1840 United States presidential election on the Liberty Party ticket. Although the Liberty Party polled less than seven thousand votes, their following became the germ of the Republican Party.

In 1837-1838 Earle was a delegate to the convention to revise Pennsylvania's constitution. There he was one of the strongest defenders of the black voting rights, along with Thaddeus Stevens. His defense of black voting rights was, however, unsuccessful. The new constitution included the word "white", formally disenfranchising blacks for the first time.

He died in Willow Grove, Pennsylvania in 1849, aged 53.

== Family ==
Earle married Mary Hussey in 1820, and they had five children. Their daughter Caroline Earle White was an American philanthropist and anti-vivisection activist. She co-founded PSPCA in 1867, and also founded the Women's Humane Society of the PSPCA in 1869 and the American Anti-Vivisection Society in 1883.

== Notable ancestors and descendants ==
- Pliny Earle I, inventor (father)
  - George H. Earle Sr., Philadelphia lawyer (son) who married Mrs. Frances ("Fanny") Van Leer, a member of the Van Leer family and anti-slave movement
    - George Howard Earle Jr., Philadelphia lawyer and "financial diplomat" who was highly sought after to save ailing corporations from financial ruin (grandson)
    - Florence Van Leer Earle Coates, poet (granddaughter)
      - George Howard Earle III, former Pennsylvania Governor (great-grandson)
      - Ralph Earle II, U. S. Ambassador (great-grandson)
