= George Hussey Earle Sr. =

American lawyer

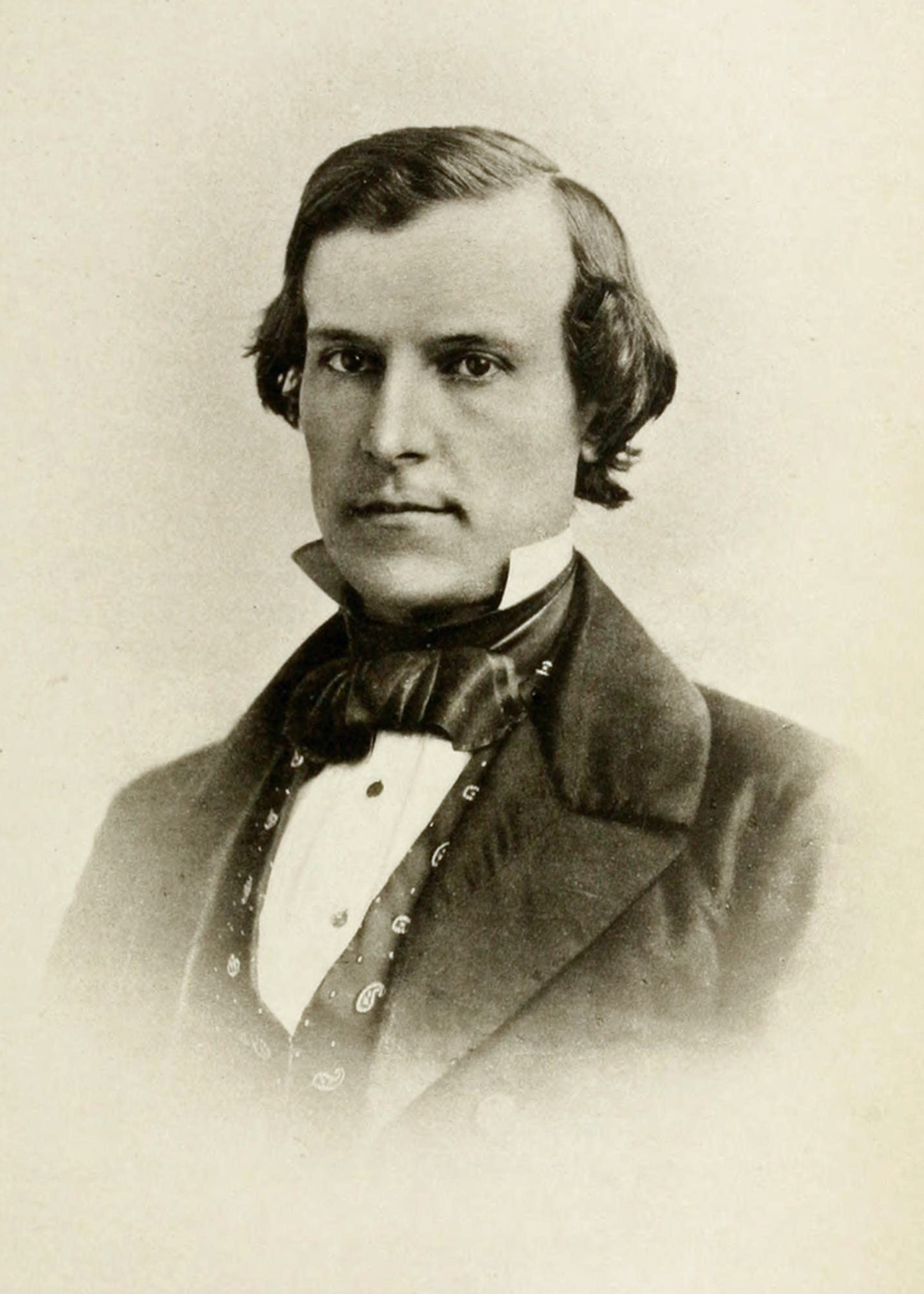
- Born: George Hussey Earle; December 8, 1823 Philadelphia, Pennsylvania, United States
- Died: June 18, 1907 (aged 83) Philadelphia, Pennsylvania, United States
- Occupation: Lawyer; Philanthropist; Municipal reformer

George Hussey Earle Sr. (December 8, 1823 – June 18, 1907) was a prominent Philadelphia lawyer. As an abolitionist, he represented many fugitive slaves. He was one of the founders of the Republican party.

== Biography ==
Born a "free Quaker" in Philadelphia, Pennsylvania to Thomas Earle and Mary Hussey, Earle was an eighth-generation descendant of Pilgrim John Howland. The August 1907 issue of Law Notes states that Earle was a "personal friend" of Abraham Lincoln, and "the oldest surviving delegate to the first Republican National Convention that nominated Fremont for the presidency."

He worked at the Baldwin Locomotive Works, and was apprenticed to Matthias Baldwin for a time.

Earle became involved in the anti-slavery movement when he opposed the riot which resulted in the burning to the ground of Pennsylvania Hall in 1838. He was a delegate to the "Pennsylvania Anti-Slavery Society, Eastern District" around 1844, and was admitted to the Philadelphia Bar on 27 January 1845. Earle "possessed an abhorrence for slavery [and] voluntarily gave his services to the cause of the fugitive slaves." In April 1859 he was retained by local abolitionists to represent Daniel [Webster] Dangerfield, a case which gained nationwide attention because "it was one of the first judicial decisions dealing with the interpretation of the Fugitive Slave Law." Lucretia Mott, a cousin of Earle's mother Mary Hussey Earle, sat beside Dangerfield during the trial. Dangerfield was released due to insufficient proof of his slavery.

He was a leading pioneer in the legal battle against the Fugitive Slave Laws.

Earle also played the role of municipal reformer. He was a member of the Committee of One Hundred (Philadelphia)—"a non-partisan effort in aid of good government" dedicated to ending bossism politics in Philadelphia in the late 1800s. Primarily made up of Independent Republicans "seeking to reform the management of the Republican party," the Committee was influential in the election of Democrat Samuel G. King as Philadelphia mayor.

He practiced law for 50 years.

In 1892 Earle's wife [Ellen] Frances Van Leer died. She was the granddaughter of Samuel Van Leer whose family was also part of the anti-slavery movement. Their family owned the Van Leer Cabin which was a station for the Underground Railroad. After her death, Earle penned a poem—the last stanza which reads:

I do not think, where'er thou art,
Thou hast forgotten me;
And I perhaps may soothe this heart,
In thinking still of thee.
Yet there was round thee such a dawn
Of light ne'er seen before,
As Fancy never could have drawn,
And never can restore!

Earle died on 18 June 1907. His funeral was held at the home of his daughter, Mrs. Edward Hine Johnson (Frances Van Leer Earle Johnson). His remains are interred at Woodlands Cemetery in Philadelphia.

== Works about George Hussey Earle Sr. ==
- George H. Earle Sr. – via Wikisource. (1907)
- Father – via Wikisource., a poem by his daughter Florence Earle Coates

== Notable ancestors and descendants ==
- Pliny Earle I, inventor (Grandfather)
- Thomas Earle, abolitionist, lawyer, philanthropist (Father)
- Caroline Earle White, philanthropist and anti-vivisection activist (Sister)
- Florence Van Leer Earle Coates, poet (Daughter)
- George Howard Earle Jr., lawyer & businessman (Son)
- George Howard Earle III, Governor of Pennsylvania, 1935-39 (Grandson)
- Ralph Earle II, U. S. Ambassador (Great-grandson)

== See also ==
- Van Leer Family
