= Edward Hornor Coates =

American businessman, financier (1846)–1921

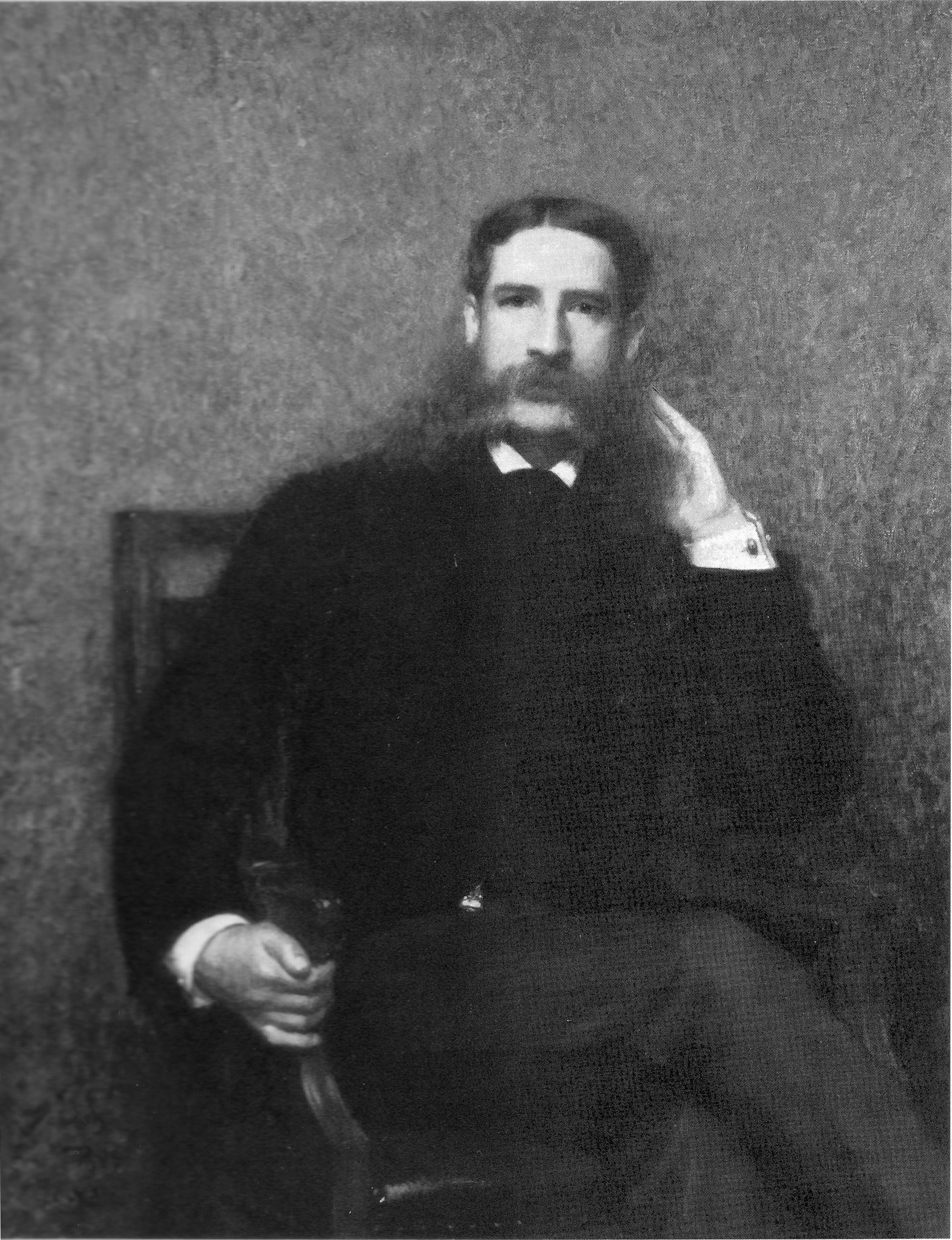
- Portrait of Edward Hornor Coates (1893) by Robert Vonnoh, Pennsylvania Academy of the Fine Arts

President of Pennsylvania Academy of the Fine Arts
- In office 1890–1906

Personal details
- Born: November 12, 1846 Philadelphia, Pennsylvania, U.S.
- Died: December 23, 1921 (aged 71) Philadelphia, Pennsylvania, U.S.
- Spouse(s): Ella May Potts (m. 1872–1874; her death), Florence Van Leer Earle Nicholson Coates (m 1879–1921; his death)
- Children: Alice Earle Nicholson (adopted step-daughter)
- Occupation: Banker, academic administrator, patron of the arts and sciences

Edward Hornor Coates (November 12, 1846 – December 23, 1921) was an American businessman, financier, and patron of the arts and sciences in Philadelphia. He served as a director of the Mechanics National Bank in 1873. He chairman of the Committee on Instruction at the Pennsylvania Academy of the Fine Arts from 1883 to 1890, and held the position of Academy president from 1890 to 1906.

== Early life and education ==
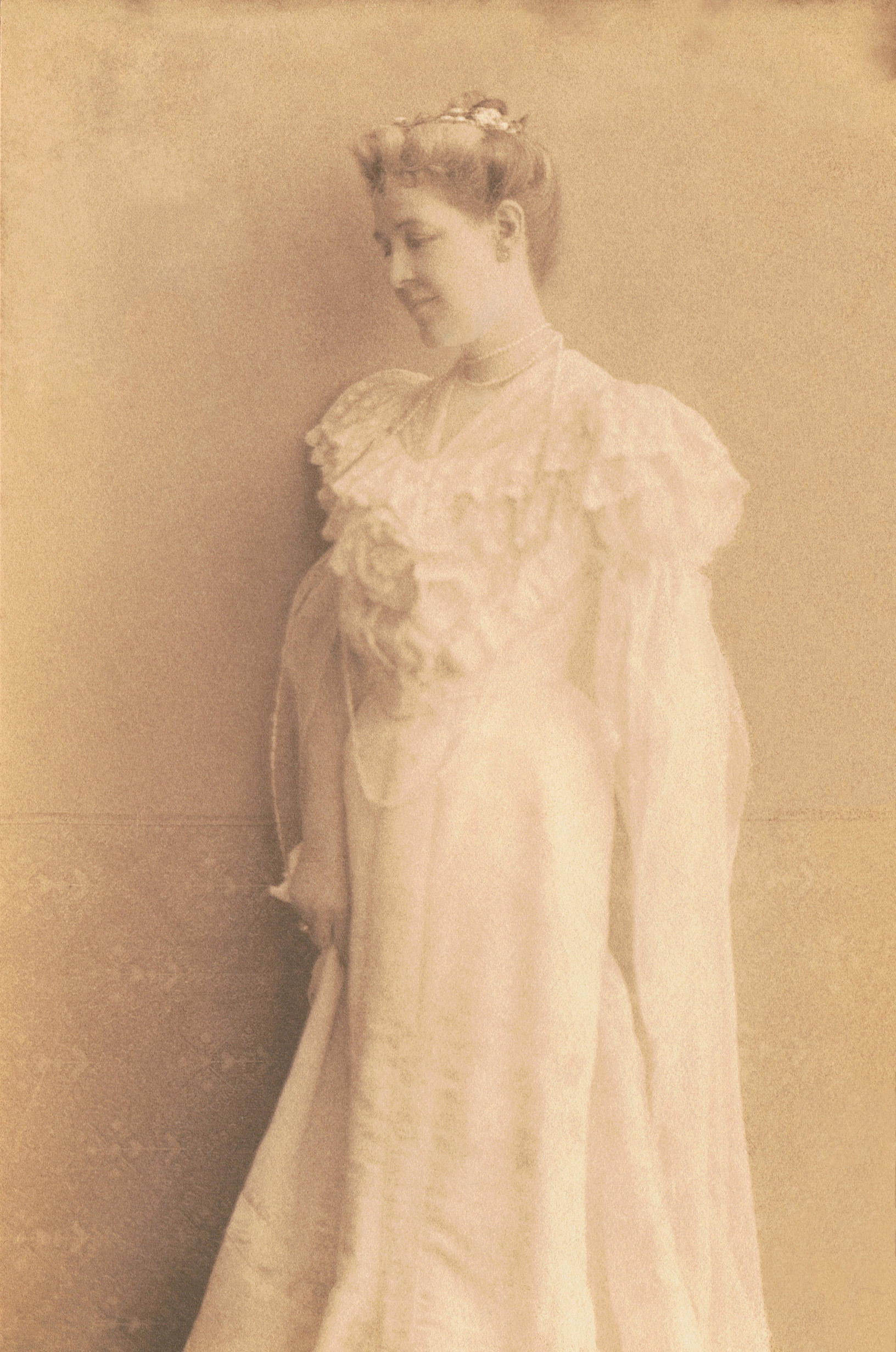
Florence Van Leer Earle Coates, Philadelphia poet

Coates was born on November 12, 1846, in Philadelphia, the son of Joseph Potts Hornor Coates and Eliza Henri Troth, a family of Quakers. He attended Haverford College in Haverford, Pennsylvania, from which he graduated in 1864.

== Career ==
Painter John McLure Hamilton, in a chapter about Coates from his book Men I Have Painted (1921), describes Coates' tenure at the Pennsylvania Academy of the Fine Arts:

The reign of Mr. Coates at the Academy marked the period of its greatest prosperity. Rich endowments were made to the schools, a gallery of national portraiture was formed, and some of the best examples of Gilbert Stuart's work acquired. The annual exhibitions attained a brilliancy and éclat hitherto unknown... Mr. Coates wisely established the schools upon a conservative basis, building almost unconsciously the dykes high against the oncoming flow of insane novelties in art patterns... In this last struggle against modernism the President was ably supported by Eakins, Anschutz, Grafly, [Henry Joseph] Thouron, Vonnoh, and Chase... His unfailing courtesy, his disinterested thoughtfulness, his tactfulness, and his modesty endeared him to scholars and masters alike. No sacrifice of time or of means was too great, if he thought he could accomplish the end he always had in view—the honour and the glory of the Academy.

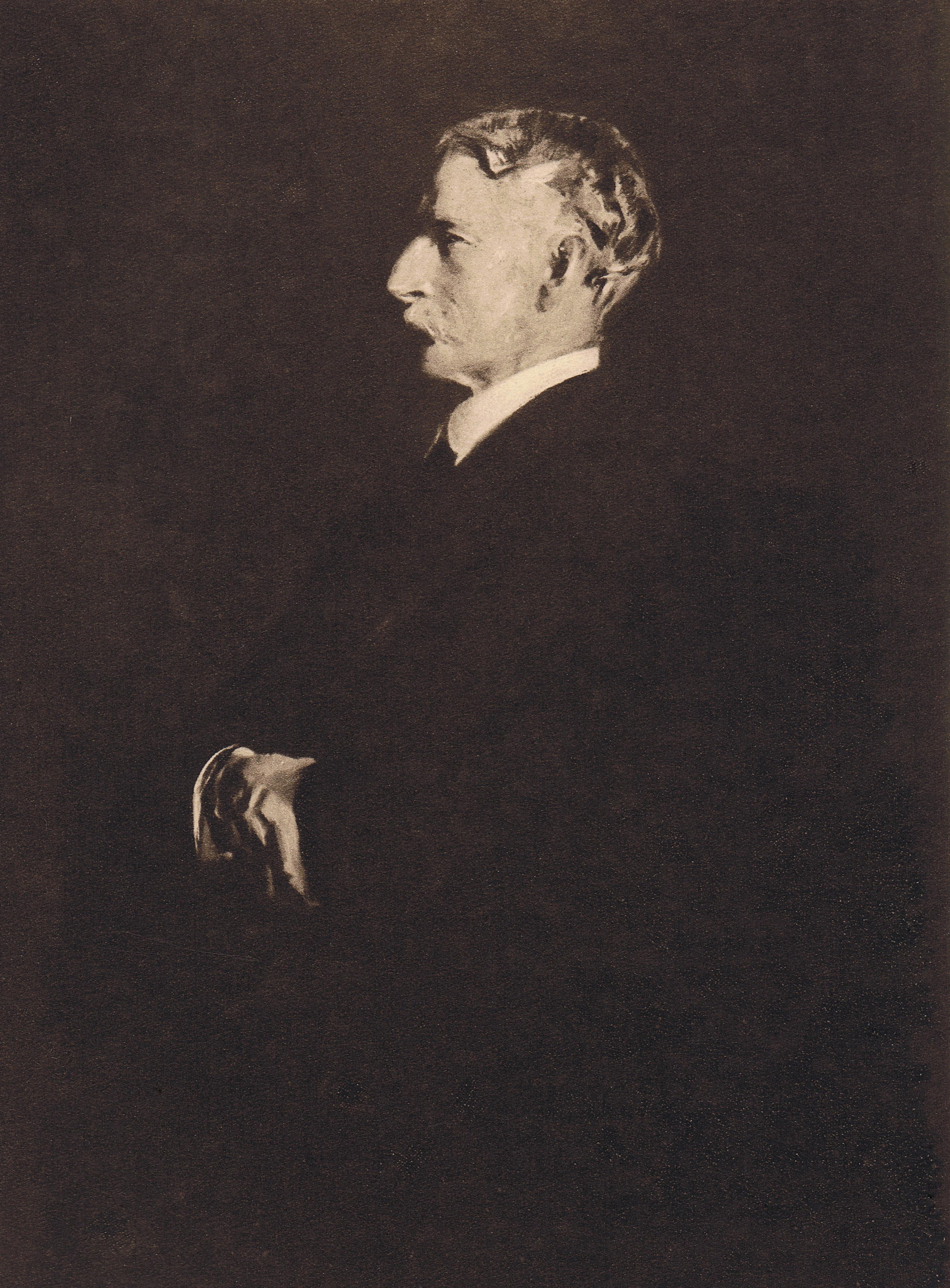
Portrait of Edward Hornor Coates, 10th President P.A.F.A. (1912) by John McLure Hamilton, private collection

Thomas Eakins became director of the school at PAFA in 1882, and Coates became chairman of instruction (and Eakins' superior) the following year. Coates commissioned The Swimming Hole from Eakins in 1884 as a work to be added to PAFA's permanent collection, only later to exchange it for the artist's Singing the Pathetic Song (1881). The nudity of the men in The Swimming Hole was unlikely to have bothered Coates—he and Eakins served as PAFA's representatives overseeing Eadweard Muybridge's photographic studies of the human body in motion. But most of the men in The Swimming Hole were PAFA students, and having students pose nude for an instructor was contrary to PAFA policy.

In January 1886, when Eakins had a male model remove his loincloth before either a female class or a mixed male-and-female class—also contrary to PAFA policy—Coates wrote him a letter of reprimand. But the incident soon snowballed into a full-blown scandal, with accusations of sexual impropriety (and even incest) against Eakins. Coates requested and received his resignation. Although their friendship was strained, Coates remained a supporter of the artist. When an Eakins client balked at paying for the bas-relief panels Knitting and Spinning, Coates bought them and donated them to PAFA.

On 24 January 1890, Coates addressed the Art Club of Philadelphia on "The Academy of the Fine Arts and Its Future," urging that "what the Academy now needs more than all else,—and it is worthy an eloquent and convincing plea,—is the intelligent interest and sympathetic co-operation of every citizen."

=== Pennsylvania politics ===
In 1890, Coates was among the signatories of the "Independent Republicans of Pennsylvania" who backed the Democratic nominee Robert E. Pattison for Governor over the Republican nominee, George W. Delamater. A vote for Delamater, they stressed, would mean "the public indorsement" of the corrupt Matthew Stanley Quay, then the junior U.S. senator from Pennsylvania. Pattison would go on to win the Governorship. In 1894, Coates joined the ranks of the "Quaker City Rebels" in the continued fight against Quay and corrupt "bossism" politics.

== Personal life ==
In 1872, Coates married Ella May Potts, who died two years later, on May 9, 1874, at the age of 22. Five years later, in 1879, he married Florence Van Leer Earle Coates, daughter of Philadelphia lawyer George H. Earle Sr. and granddaughter of U.S. Army officer Samuel Van Leer. This was also a second marriage for Florence; her first husband William Nicholson died in 1877 after only five years of marriage. Coates eventually adopted Florence's daughter from her first marriage, Alice Earle Nicholson. Florence and Edward had one child together in 1881, but the baby, Josephine Wisner Coates, died in infancy.

The family had a city house at 1018 Spruce Street and a suburban house known as "Willing Terrace" in the Germantown section of Philadelphia. A frequent guest was literary and social critic Matthew Arnold, whom they would host during his stays in Philadelphia. Arnold both inspired and encouraged Mrs. Coates in her pursuit of writing poetry, which eventually led to the publishing of nearly three hundred poems in leading magazines and five volumes of collected verse. The family spent the summer months in the Adirondacks, where they owned "Camp Elsinore," a summer retreat by Upper St. Regis Lake. There they entertained, rested, and escaped the humidity of Philadelphia summers. Many of Mrs. Coates' nature poems were inspired by the flora and fauna of the Adirondacks. About 1908, the couple moved to a city house at 2024 Spruce Street, near Rittenhouse Square, where they resided for the remainder of their lives.

=== Death ===
Edward Hornor Coates died on December 23, 1921, in Philadelphia. A funeral service was held at his Spruce Street house three days later, and he was buried at the Church of the Redeemer (Episcopal) churchyard in Bryn Mawr, Pennsylvania. The inscription on Coates' headstone reads, "High thought seated in a heart of courtesy", which was Phillip Sydney's description of an honorable man and gentleman.

== Legacy ==
On March 31, 1922, a "valuable collection of personal association books and first editions of English and American Authors" owned by Coates was sold at a Stan V. Henkels auction.

In 1923, Mrs. Coates presented The Edward H. Coates Memorial Collection to the Pennsylvania Academy of the Fine Arts. This included Robert Vonnoh's 1893 portrait of Coates (shown above); The Tragic Muse, a 1912 portrait of Mrs. Coates by Violet Oakley; Old Ocean's Gray and Melancholy Waste (1885) by William Trost Richards (winner of PAFA's 1885 Temple Medal); and sculptor Charles Grafly's 1903 portrait bust of Coates. Twenty-four other paintings by various artists, as well as two other pieces of sculpture, were also in the collection. It was exhibited together at the Academy from 4 November 1923 to 10 January 1924.

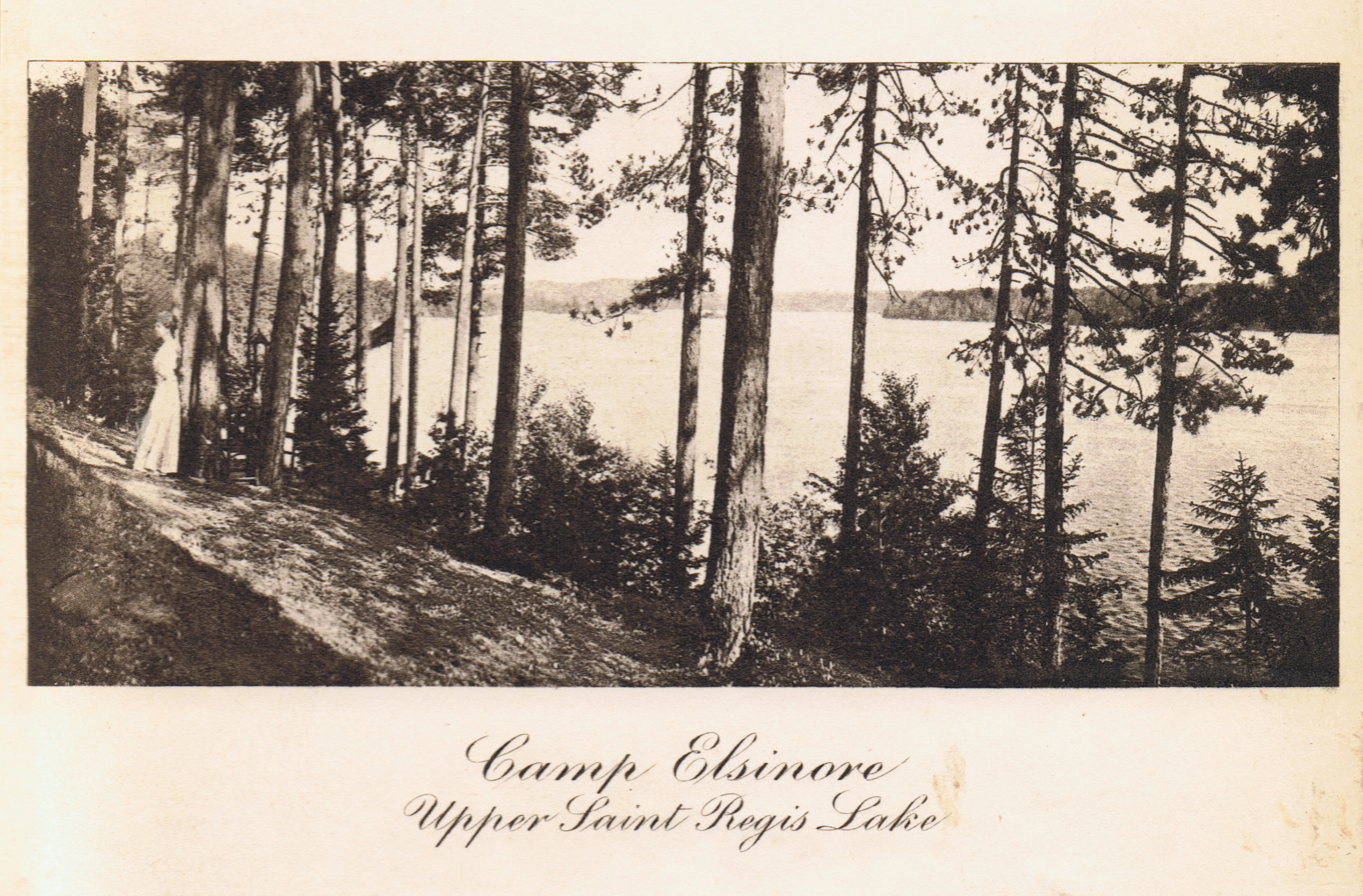
Camp Elsinore, Upper St. Regis Lake, New York.

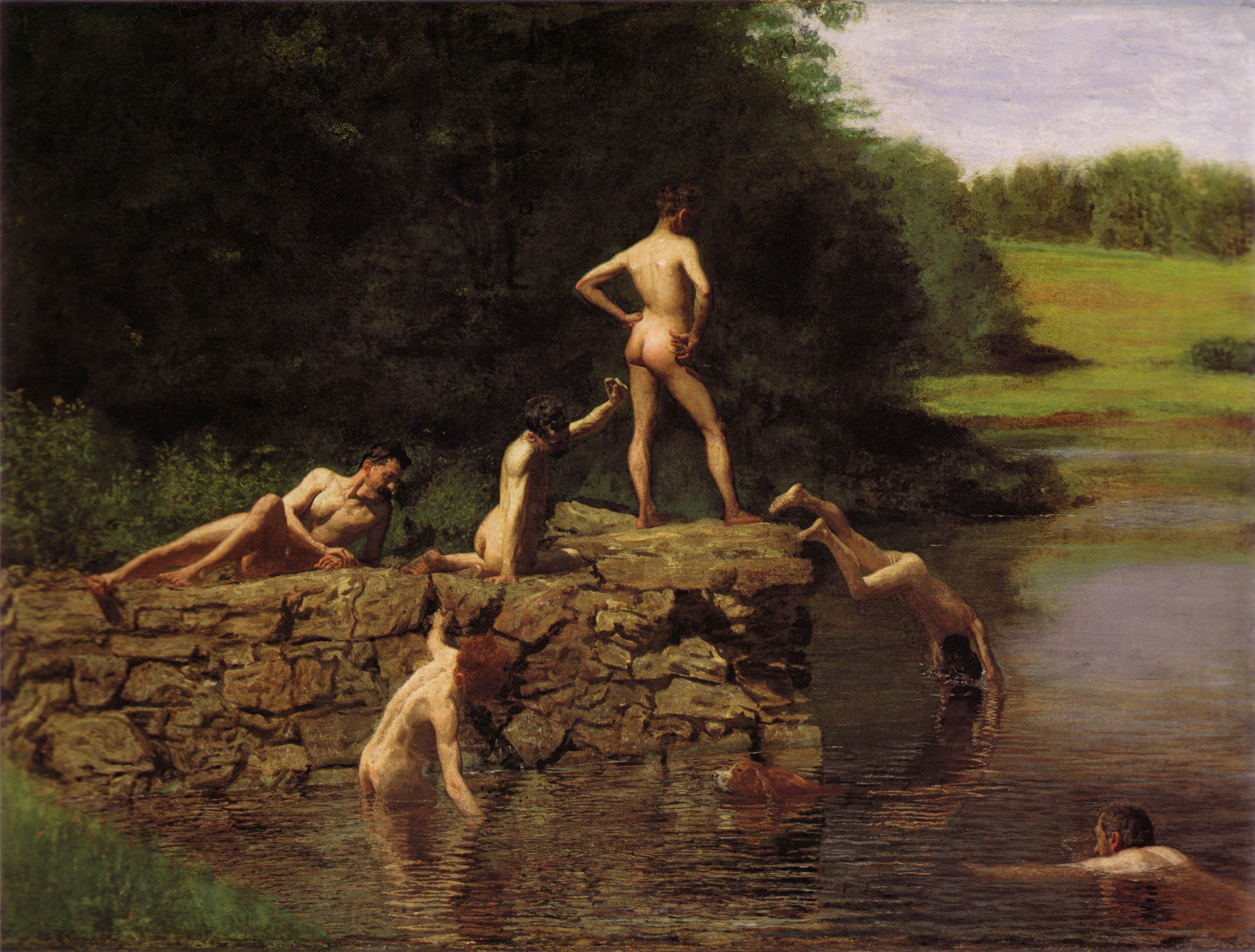
The Swimming Hole (1884–85) by Thomas Eakins, Amon Carter Museum of American Art.

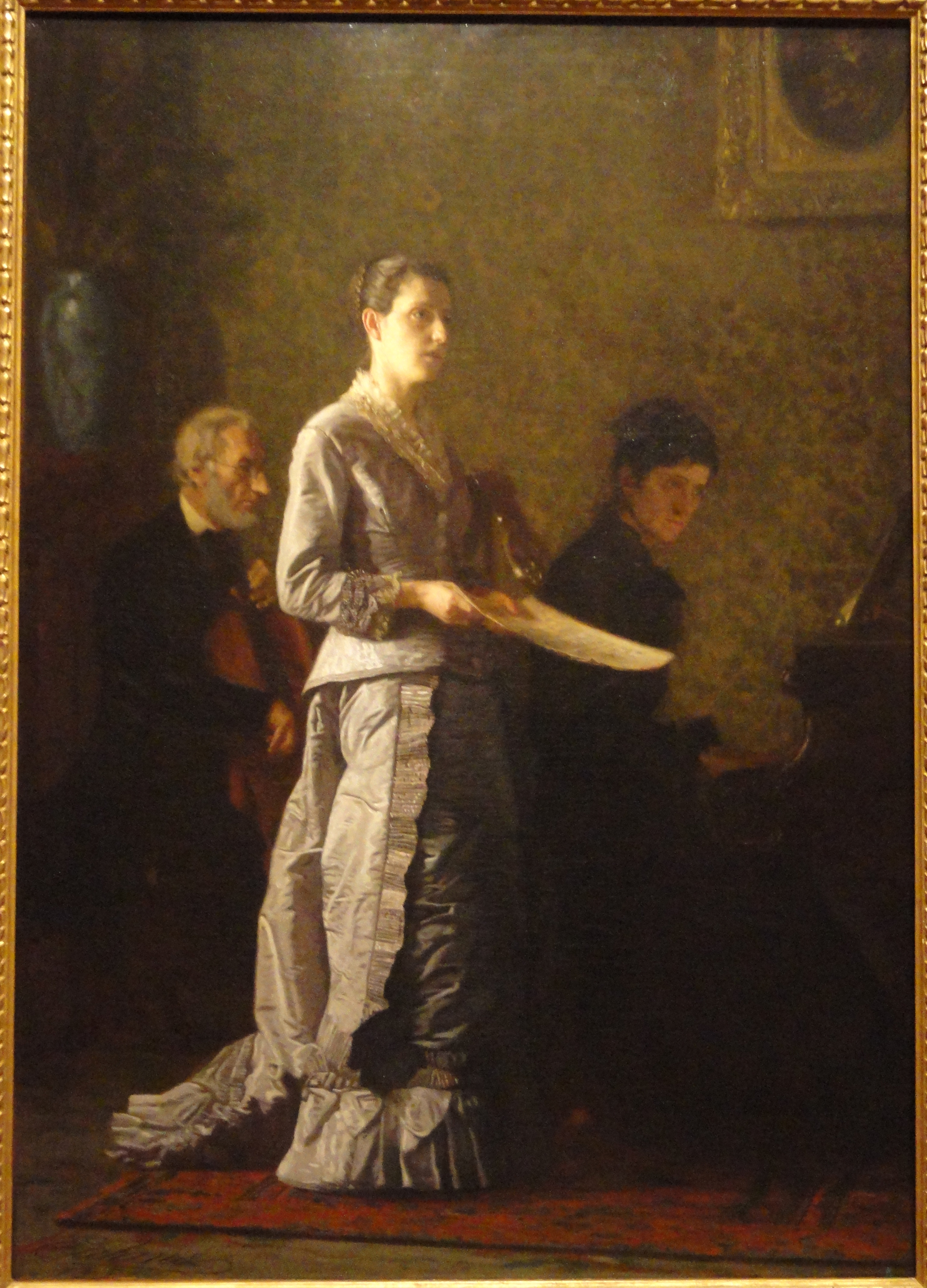
Singing a Pathetic Song (1881) by Thomas Eakins, Corcoran Gallery of Art.

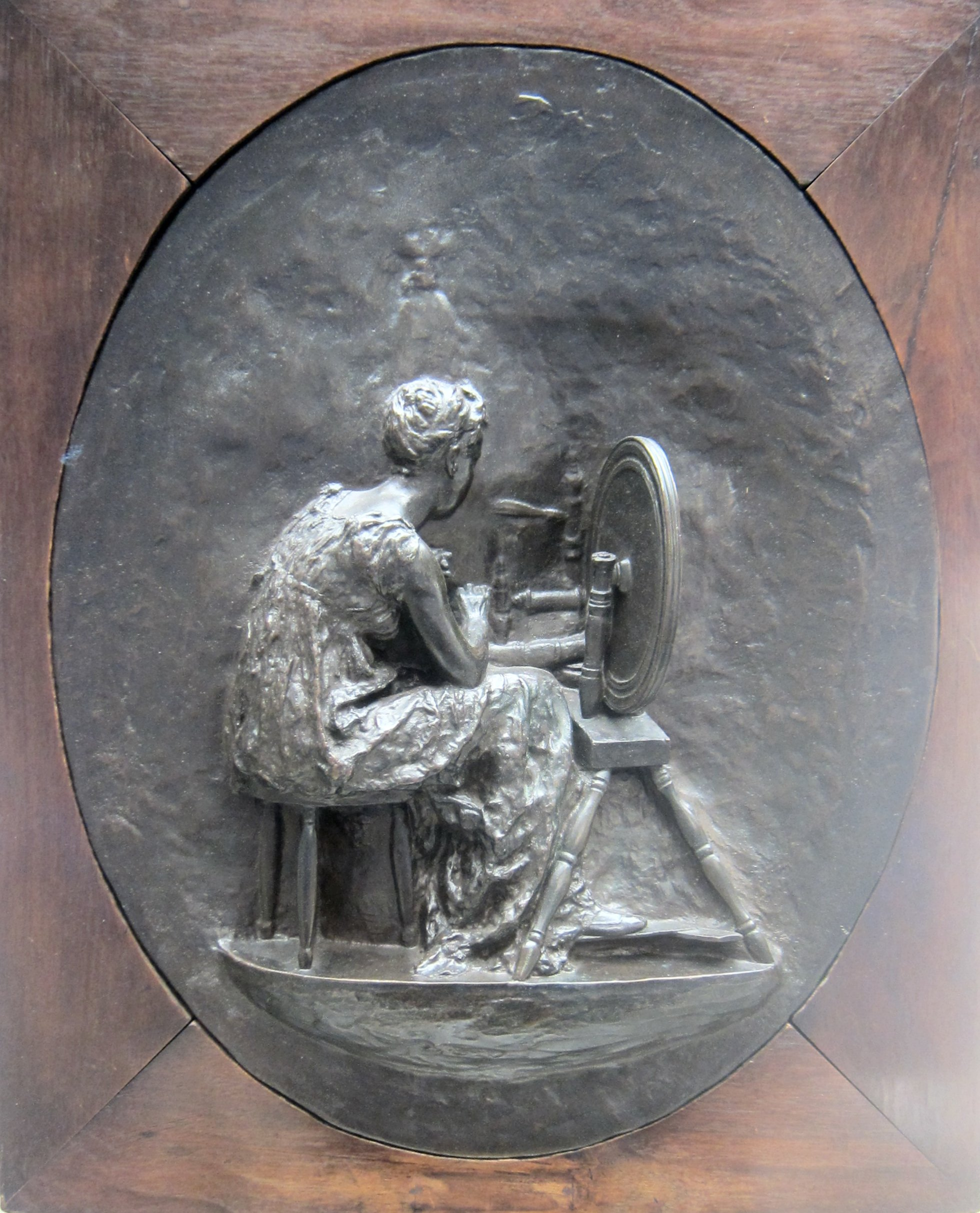
Spinning (1881) by Thomas Eakins, Pennsylvania Academy of the Fine Arts

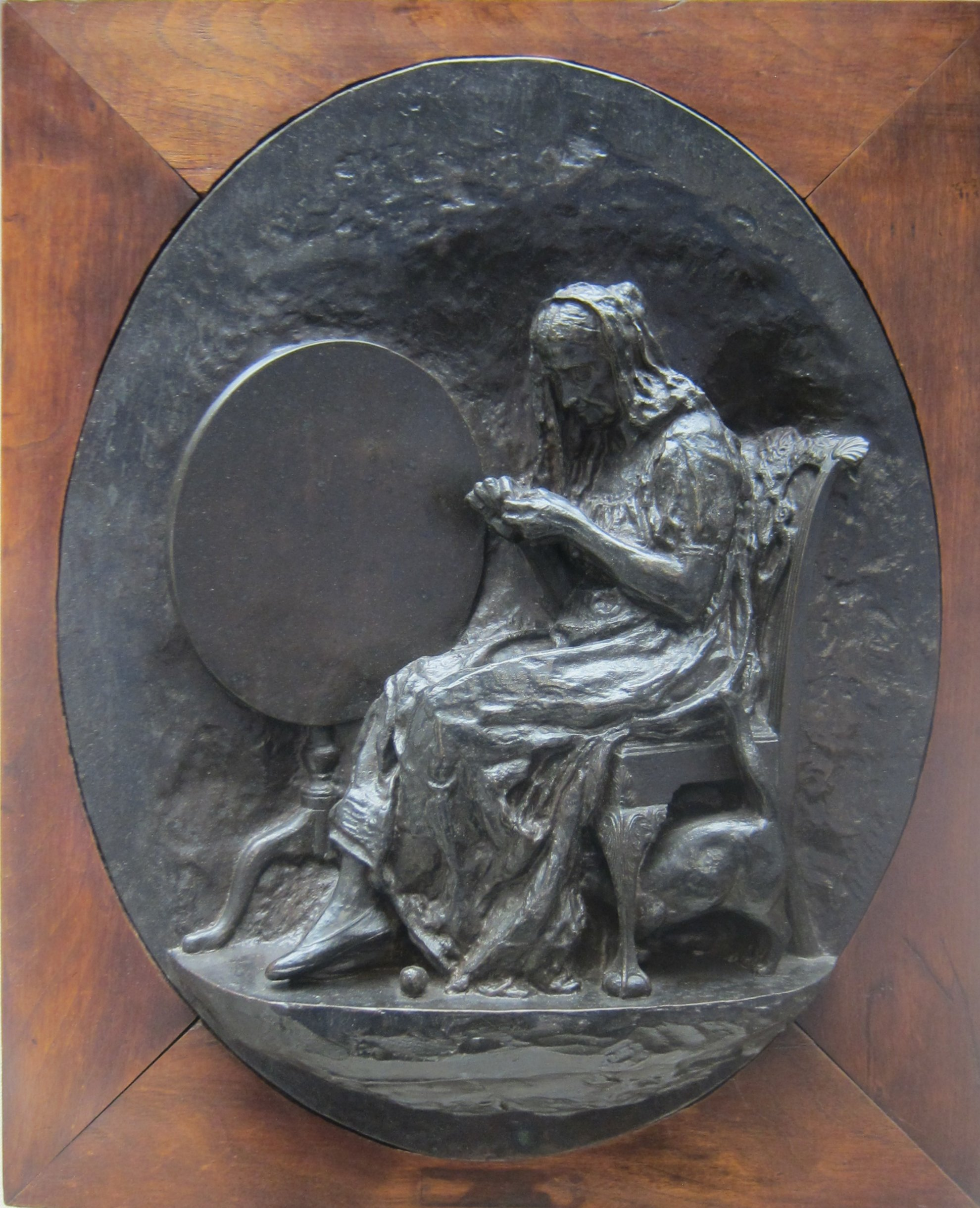
Knitting (1881) by Thomas Eakins, Pennsylvania Academy of the Fine Arts

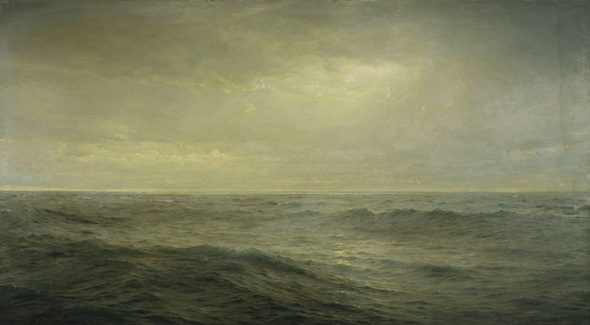
Old Ocean's Gray and Melancholy Waste (1885) by William Trost Richards, Pennsylvania Academy of the Fine Arts

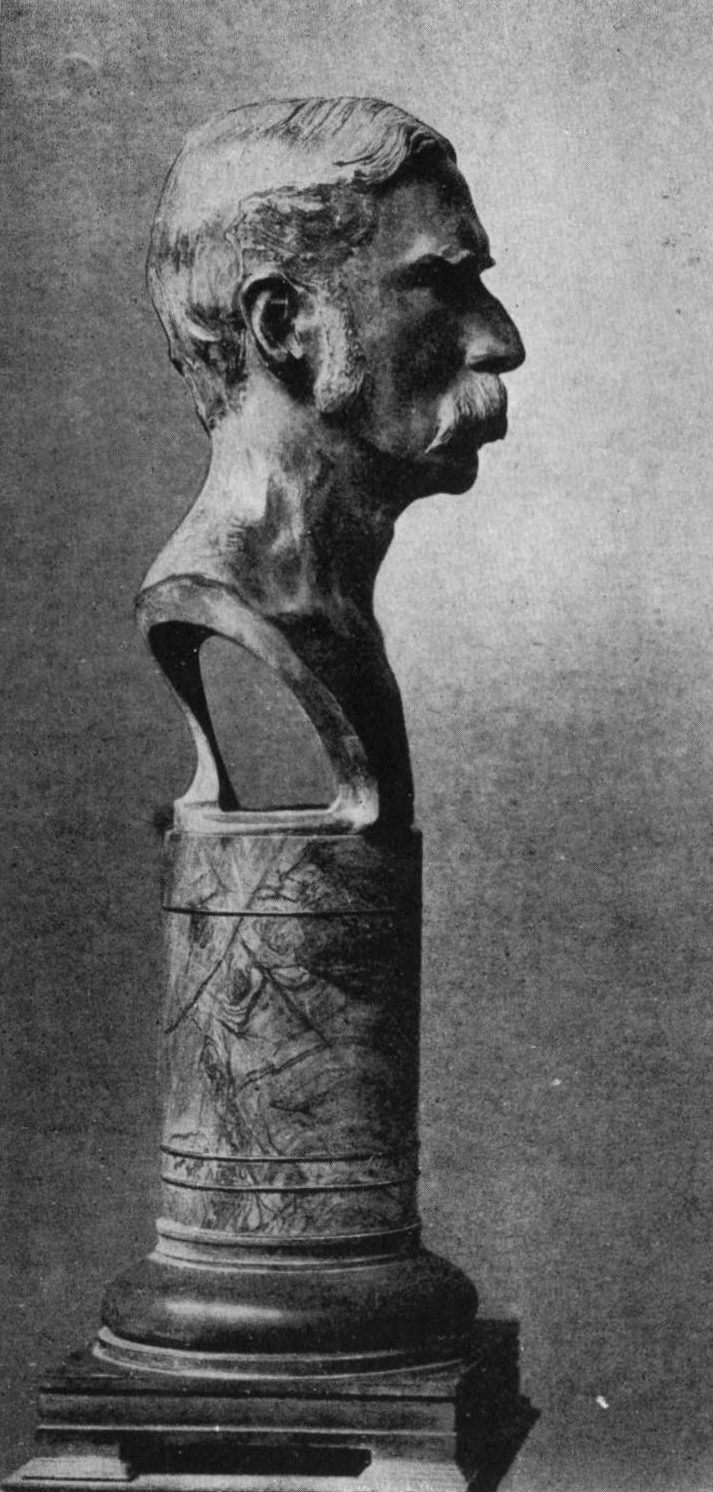
Bust of Edward Hornor Coates (1903) by Charles Grafly, Pennsylvania Academy of the Fine Arts

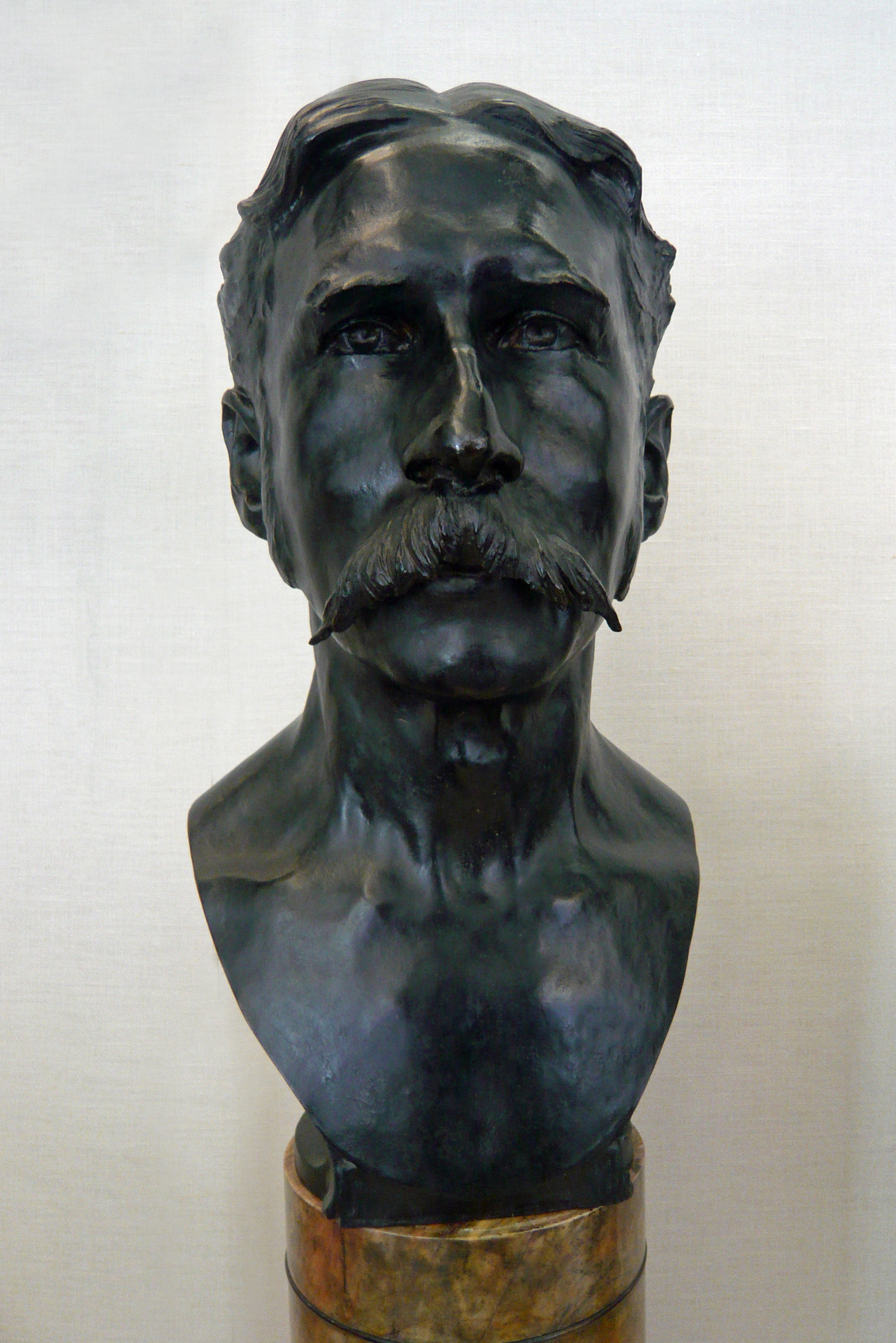
Portrait bust of Edward Hornor Coates by Charles Grafly (1903)

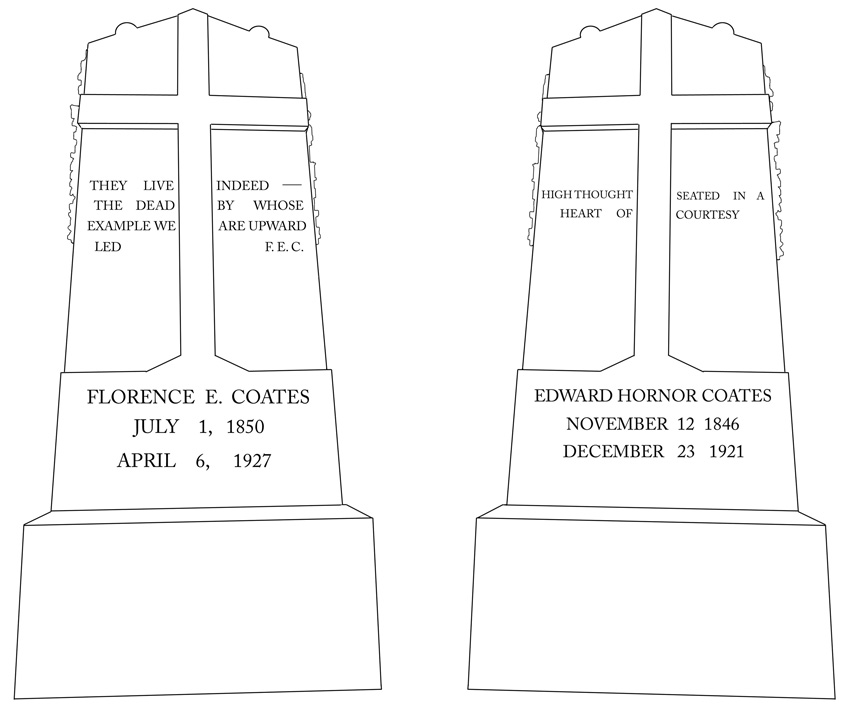
Digital drawing of the headstones of Mr. and Mrs. Coates at the Church of the Redeemer (Episcopal) churchyard in Bryn Mawr, Pennsylvania

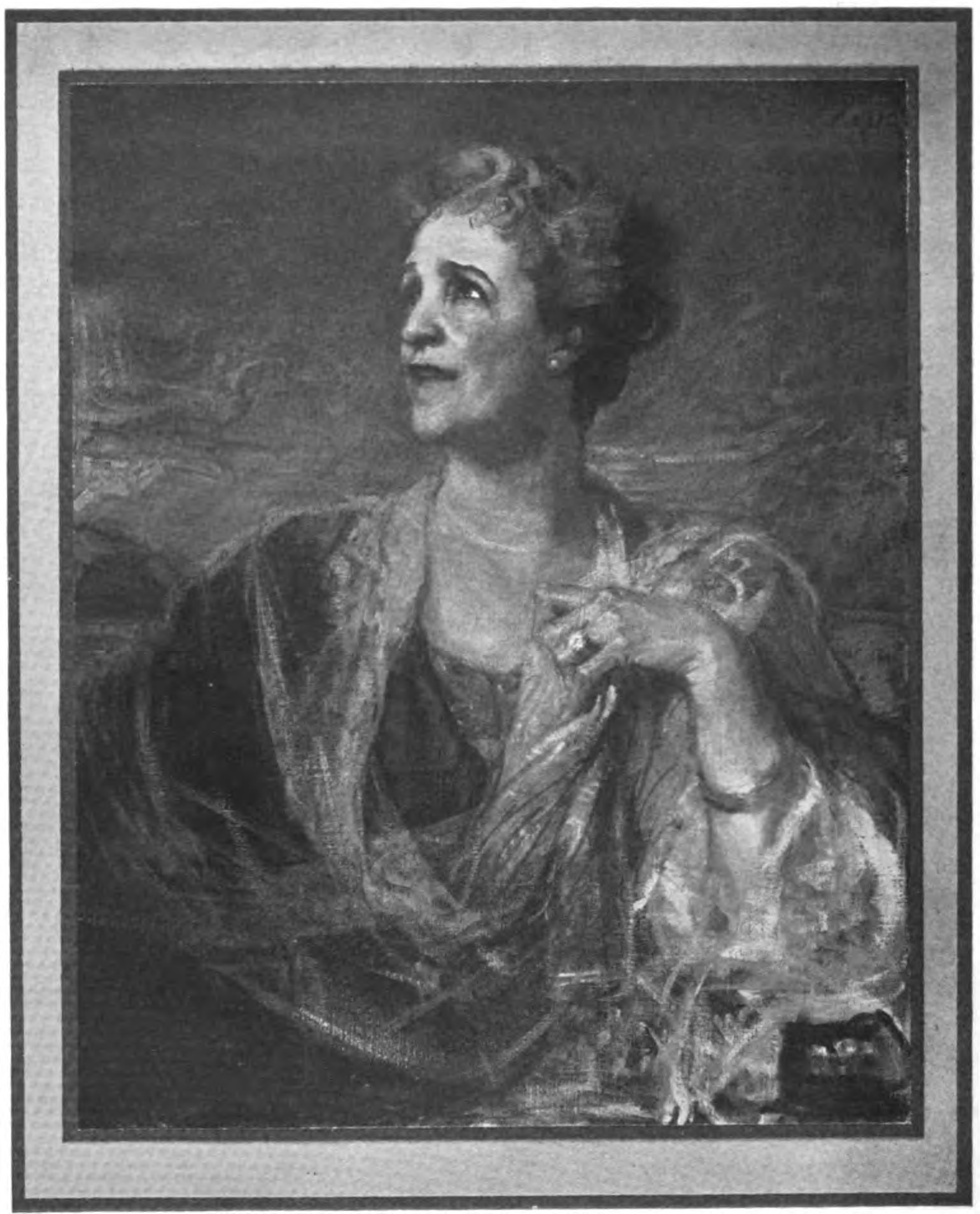
The Tragic Muse: Portrait of Florence Earle Coates (1912) by Violet Oakley, Pennsylvania Academy of the Fine Arts
