= George Howard Earle Jr. =

American lawyer (1856–1928)

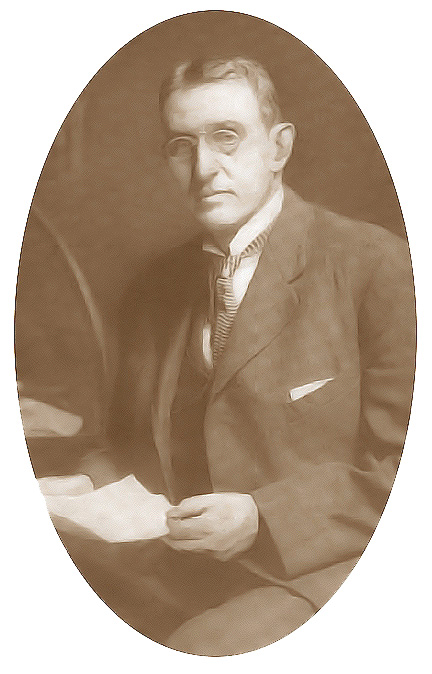
- Born: George Hussey Earle Jr. July 6, 1856 Philadelphia, Pennsylvania
- Died: February 19, 1928 (aged 71) Philadelphia, Pennsylvania
- Occupation: Lawyer; Businessman
- Relatives: George Hussey Earle Sr. (father); Florence Van Leer Earle Coates (sister); George Howard Earle III (son); Thomas Earle (grandfather); Samuel Van Leer (great great grandfather); Anthony Wayne (great-uncle)

Signature
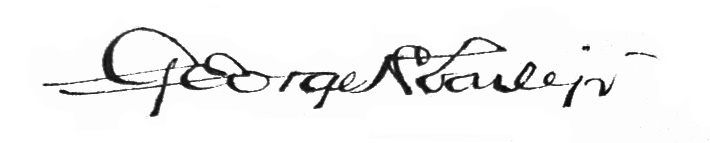

George Howard Earle Jr. (July 6, 1856 – February 19, 1928) was an American lawyer and businessman from Philadelphia who worked as a receiver and rescued multiple businesses from financial hardship. He was a political reformer and a member of the Committee of One Hundred in Philadelphia which worked to end bossism politics in the city.

== Early life and education ==
Earle was born in Philadelphia to George H. Earle Sr. and Mrs. Frances ("Fanny") Van Leer Earle. He was a member of the influential Van Leer family, grandson of abolitionist and philanthropist Thomas Earle and great-great-grandson of American Revolutionary War Officer Samuel Van Leer

He graduated from Harvard University (1879) and was admitted to the Philadelphia bar on December 15, 1862. He worked as a lawyer in the firm of Earle & White in Philadelphia.

== Career ==
He was known for his abilities as a "business doctor" and rescued many organizations from financial ruin after being appointed as receiver and reorganizer. He was appointed as president and director to nearly two dozen Philadelphia companies and corporations including The Guarantee Trust and Safe Deposit Company, the Finance Company of Philadelphia, the Trademen's Bank, the Market Street National, the Reading Railroad, the Chestnut Street National Bank, the Chestnut Street Trust Company and the Real Estate Trust Company.

Along with his father, Earle was a member of the Committee of One Hundred (Philadelphia)—"a non-partisan effort in aid of good government" dedicated to ending bossism politics in Philadelphia in the late 1800s. This committee of reformers consisted initially of Independent Republicans who sought to reform the management of the Republican party; however, it would eventually lose influence and effectiveness. Some of the reasons for the ineffectiveness was the division between reformers over the question of partisanship, poor organization, dislike of political activism, an autocratic manner and being geographically isolated from the city. Earle later remarked that it had been "essentially aristocratic in temperament." Despite the committee's failure to bring about a lasting, broad-scale influence in the city, Earle would continue to speak up for good government practices, and for the protection of political liberty for all Americans.

On October 3, 1896, at a Republican meeting in Berwyn, Pennsylvania, Earle urged his "fellow citizens" to vote for McKinley over Bryan, stating:

...a false prophet has come among you... who, in a country where all are in the highest class—that of the American citizens—tries to divide us into many, and then set those classes against each other; who tries to set State against State, section against section, and so nullify the great work for which Abraham Lincoln gave his life; who tries to lead us into paths of dishonor and asks us to disgrace the country for which we would give our lives...

It would not be the last time Earle would warn about the threat of populism. In a letter to Pennsylvania Governor Samuel Pennypacker on May 16, 1906, Earle wrote of his concern that then President Theodore Roosevelt might be yielding to the latest "craze" of "Bryanism"—i.e., yielding to populism instead of standing on principle with regard to public policy—serving to discredit the Republican party:

...some one has to speak in favor of the right when so speaking is unpopular. The more unpopular, the greater the necessity... The Republican party has done much for this country. It has often created and preserved prosperity by fighting crazes. For the first time in its history, it is yielding to one. If it would only say "we have made this prosperity, it is our child, and shall have our protection," and stand to its guns, it will beat Bryanism to death as it always has. But with its leader caring more for popularity than principle, courageous, as he is uninformed, I, myself, am convinced that it will have to go out of power in order that it may return chastened and more trusted than ever... I worked hard for Roosevelt's re-election, had great admiration for him, and still have, but I very much fear him... It is surprising at this time to find how many "old things" are true when the greater part of the world is engaged in discrediting and despising them.

After the Panic of 1907, Earle would speak out against a central bank—despite the "present evils," stating, "I can suggest no remedy, but would prefer present evils to those resulting from the creation of too centralized a power; and the answer, to my mind, is obvious. The true remedy must be found, not in placing our dependence upon the discretion of any one, but of every one,—that is, again, upon liberty, rather than upon power and restraint."

In an article of February 1910, Earle is depicted as a "doctor to ailing corporations", the interviewer asserting that there is "strong ground for belief that he has an idea of doctoring the country's ills in the same manner as he would a sick corporation"—

There are little lakes at Broadacres, which he has made by damming a brook, and groups of bathers can be seen there almost any day in the summer.

"The place is wide open," he said in explanation. "I have always had a profound sympathy for the man who from the day of his birth has had no foot of land that he could call his own. The least I can do is to give every one free use of mine."

When told that Mr. Rockefeller, on his estate at Pocantico Hills, had gone in for high iron fences everywhere, he shook his head gravely and said:

"That is the sort of thing we shall have to do away with some day."

It was an astonishing sentiment, coming from the president of so many corporations. It is talk of this kind that makes Earle a puzzle to many men. With millions of dollars profitably invested, with an estate that is little short of ducal, lying almost within one of the greatest and richest cities of the country; with a penchant for golf, cricket, and motoring, a mania for collecting old coins and old masters—an aristocrat, if there be any such thing in America—he is still not only an every-day man, but at times he utters sentiments that fall nothing short of socialism.

In his conversation he makes frequent reference to liberty, but if you listen you will discover that it is the liberty of Patrick Henry and Franklin, and not of Gorky or Karl Marx. He declares his belief in the doctrine of Malthus, and says that before long we shall have to reconstruct our ideas of tillage, care for our soil, and stop our extravagance, and that a lot of people will have to go to work.

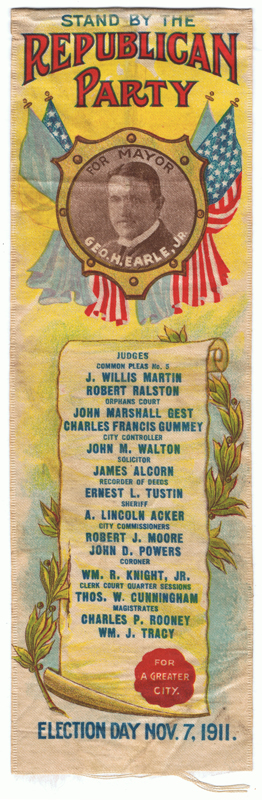

Never before having sought political office for himself, Mr. Earle was eventually sought after and subsequently backed by U. S. Senator Boies Penrose to be the Republican candidate in the election for mayor of Philadelphia in 1911. In the Republican primary election held on 30 September 1911, Earle defeated William S. Vare by 23,000 votes; but Earle would lose the general election in November of that year by 4,000 votes to the Keystone-Democrat fusion candidate, Rudolph Blankenburg—an independent Republican and also former member of Philadelphia's Committee of One Hundred.

One month after Mr. Earle's unsuccessful run for mayor, he was asked to speak before the United States Senate Committee on Interstate Commerce where he gave the committee "the benefit of his experience and suggestions as to what the country needs in the way of laws amendatory of the Sherman law...and as to what further legislation is desirable to regulate interstate commerce." Earle would subsequently be asked by the chairman of the committee, Moses E. Clapp, to draft a "tentative bill embodying [his] views as to additional legislation." Mr. Earle's prepared draft was presented by Mr. Clapp to the Committee on the evening of 29 December 1911. In Earle's draft, only eleven words (two phrases) were stricken from the original act—none of which are from the body (sections)—for Mr. Earle thought the act to be "practically a perfect piece of legislation," and merely sought to "strengthen" the law. An article written in the February 3, 1912, issue of Telephony (Chicago) states:

[Earle] told the committee, the Sherman anti-trust law is not only practically a perfect piece of legislation, but it is also in complete harmony with the attitude of all peoples and all governments in the past toward this question. In the few instances where any government has attempted to foster the trust and the monopoly the result invariably has been the promotion of socialism... He advised the committee by all means to re-enact the Sherman law, making only two changes with a view, not of altering its meaning, but of strengthening and perfecting its operation.

In July 1918, Mr. Earle—then president of the Real Estate Trust Company in Philadelphia—presided over a convention held in St. Louis, Missouri, by the United States Council of State Banking Associations. Some held that the purpose of the organization was to disrupt the movement to bring the "State banks and trust companies into the Federal Reserve system," but Earle issued a statement saying that State institutions meet local wants and needs just as national banks meet broader national situations, and that "as there might be matters to discuss and adjust involving conflicting interests it would be better in such instances [for State banks] to have a council of their own to advise and negotiate on such matters." He thought it foolish that skeptics would guess at the principles and purposes of the convention, mentioning the availability of the organization's resolutions, and ended his statement by saying, "Speaking for myself, I think an application of American principles of democracy is all that is necessary; free discussion and the fullest cooperation after it."

On March 24, 1924, The Earle Theatre—located at 11th and Market streets in Philadelphia—opened to the public. Named after Mr. Earle, the theater would showcase the 'World's Biggest Stars' to Philadelphia audiences until its final stage show on February 26, 1953.

== Personal life ==
Earle married Catharine H. French on 12 December 1881, two years after he graduated from Harvard. Together they had ten children including George Howard Earle III who became Governor of Pennsylvania from 1935 to 1939.

Earle died on 19 February 1928 at his home in Rittenhouse Square after being ill for nearly a year. He is buried at the Church of the Redeemer churchyard in Bryn Mawr, Pennsylvania.

Six years after Mr. Earle's death, his oldest son, George H. Earle III, would run for Governor of Pennsylvania on the Democratic ticket. A New York Times article reported that the candidate's mother, Mrs. George H. Earle Jr., registered as a Republican that election year. Upon being asked why she did not register as a Democrat, she answered simply, "I have always been a Republican." Her party affiliation did not keep her from appearing with her son at a Democratic rally just days before, however, where she would receive an ovation from the crowd. The article also reports that Democratic city chairman John B. Kelly—"former bricklayer who had become a wealthy contractor"—said it was only "through a misunderstanding" that Mrs. Earle registered Republican—although in light of her husband's history with and dedication to the "Party of Lincoln," Mr. Kelly's statement may have been made solely for political purposes. George Earle III went on to win the governorship, and was the first Democratic governor of Pennsylvania since Robert E. Pattison took office in 1891, stating later that he "literally rode into office on the coat-tails of President Roosevelt, and [has] no hesitation in saying so." A grandson, Ralph Earle II—son to the former governor—would be born just months after Earle Jr.'s death, and would become a U.S. Ambassador, and "chief negotiator at the SALT II round of talks on nuclear disarmament."

== List of works ==
Those on the Lever Act, as amended, led me to read an excellent, if somewhat verbose, discussion by George H. Earle Jr. ...

Oliver Wendell Holmes Jr. on reading Does Price Fixing Destroy Liberty? (1920)

- The Liberty to Trade as Buttressed by National Law 84pp. (1909)
- Plan of Bill Proposed by Hon. George H. Earle Jr., Philadelphia. Proposed amendment/revision to Sherman Antitrust law (1911)
- Catalogue of the magnificent collection of ancient Greek and Roman, European, Oriental, early American and United States coins of George H. Earle Jr., Esq., Philadelphia 225pp. (1912)
- Does Price Fixing Destroy Liberty? A consideration of certain economic and common law principles applying to governmental interferences with the liberty of trade. 183pp. (1920)
- Is Capital Income? Does the power of taxation to destroy extend to the destruction of constitutional guarantees? 42pp. (1921)

=== Articles ===
- A Central Bank as a Menace to Liberty (1908)
- Half a Slap and Half a Boost (1912)

=== Letters ===
- Letter to Samuel W. Pennypacker from George H. Earle Jr., May 16, 1906

=== Court testimony ===
- Testimony of George H. Earle Jr. (7 Feb 1891) Seventh meeting of the Joint Legislative Committee to investigate the cause of the failures of state and private banks.
- "Testimony of Mr. George H. Earle Jr.", Hearings Held Before the Special Committee on the Investigation of the American Sugar Refining Co. and Others. Vol. 2, p. 1217-1272. House of Representatives: Washington Government Printing Office (1911)
- "Statement of George H. Earle Jr., Real Estate Trust Co., Broad and Chestnut Streets, Philadelphia, PA." (6 December 1911) Hearing Before the Committee on Interstate Commerce, United States Senate, Sixty-Second Congress, Pursuant to S. Res. 98: A resolution directing the Committee on Interstate Commerce to investigate and report desirable changes in the laws regulating and controlling corporations, persons, and firms engaged in interstate commerce. (1912) Vol. I, p. 770-810.

== Works about George H. Earle Jr. ==
- George H. Earle Jr., Doctor to Ailing Corporations by John Kimberly Mumford. (Munsey's Magazine, February 1910)
- The Wizardry of George H. Earle Jr. (Current Literature, November 1911)
- "Shows Monopoly to Have Been a Menace for Centuries: George H. Earle Jr., Noted Philadelphia Business Man, Tells Senate Committee on Interstate Commerce Sherman Law Should be Strengthened—Cites History to Prove Continual Fight Against, and Evils of, Monopoly—How to Amend the Law." (Telephony, 3 February 1912)

== Appointments and assignments ==
Mr. Earle derives from his Quaker ancestry the breadth of view that recognizes no monopoly of integrity or weakness in any [religious] denomination, and that business ability and character are more valuable [to a financial corporation], because less easily pretended, than piety.

- Lawyer, Earle & White, Phila.
- Equitable Trust and Co., Phila. (Director)
- Pennsylvania Warehousing and Safe Deposit Co., Phila. (Pres & Dir)
- Guarantee Trust and Safe Deposit Co., Phila. (VP & Dir; resigned his post as VP upon election to the Finance Company of Pennsylvania)
- Finance Company of Pennsylvania, Phila. (President)
- Reading Railroad (Commercial agent)
- Philadelphia and Reading Railroad (on reorganization planning committee in 1895)
- Chestnut Street National Bank, Phila. (Appointed Receiver in Jan 1898)
- Chestnut Street Trust and Savings Fund Co., Phila. (Assignee, along w/ Richard Y. Cook in Jan 1898)
- Record Publishing Co. (Managing Director; took up loans in March 1898)
- Tradesmen's National Bank, Phila. (President; retired as Pres. in 1910)
- Market Street National Bank, Phila. (President; retired as Pres. in 1910)
- Philadelphia Company (Director)
- Quebec Central Railway Co. (Director)
- United Railways Investment Company of San Francisco (appointed Director April 1906)
- Real Estate Trust Company of Philadelphia (Pres & Dir) (reorganized company in 1906)
- Rapid Transit Company (Director)
- Finance Committee of Choctaw Railroad Co. (Chairman)
- Chestnut Street and Safe Deposit Co. (Assignee)
- Board of Brokers (Member)
- Real Estate Trust Co. (1908) (Appointed Receiver and made President)
- Pennsylvania Sugar Refining Company (Receiver)
