= Pro Patria (Coates) =

Poems supporting US involvement in WW1

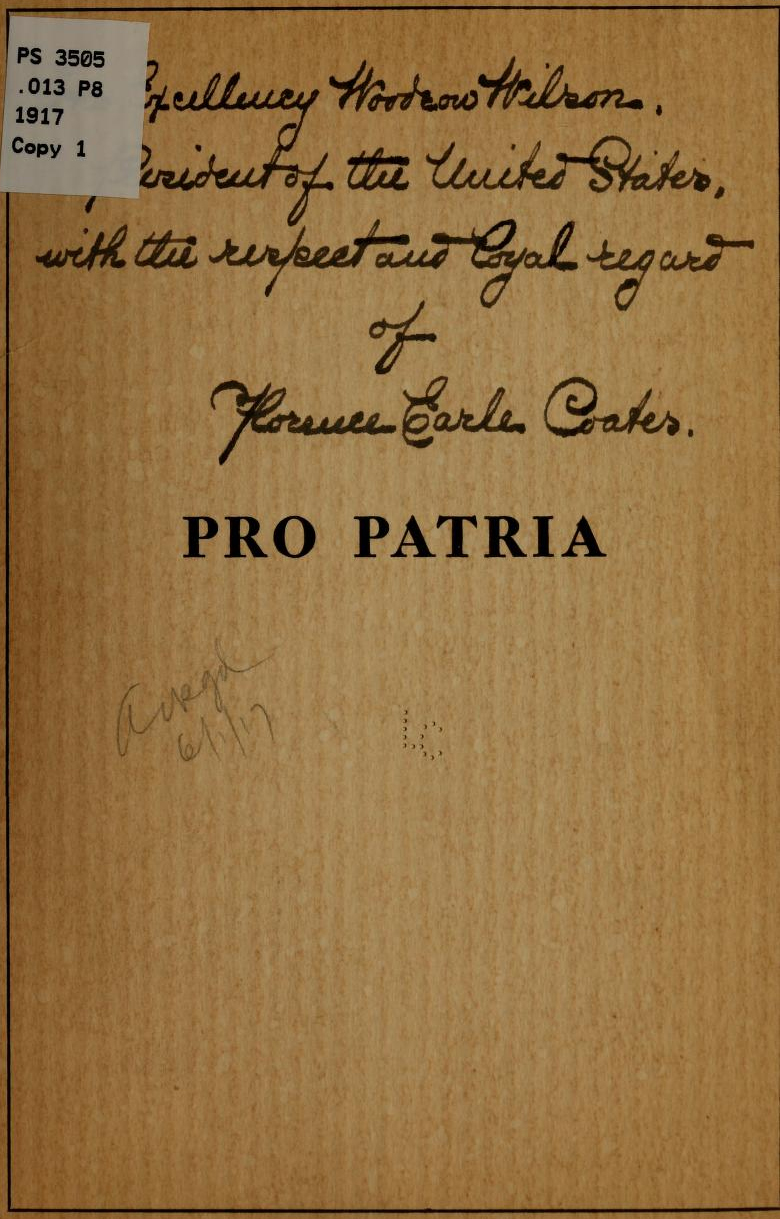
- Author: Florence Earle Coates
- Language: English
- Published: Philadelphia
- Publisher: Privately printed
- Publication date: 1917
- Publication place: United States
- Text: Pro Patria at Wikisource

Pro Patria (1917) is a pamphlet of poems written by Florence Earle Coates privately printed in support of American involvement during World War I.

== Table of Contents ==
- Better to die
- America
- The American People to the Allies
- Under the Flag
- Address of President Wilson to the Congress of the United States, April 2, 1917
- America Speaks
- The Union of the Flags
- Live thy Life

== Background ==
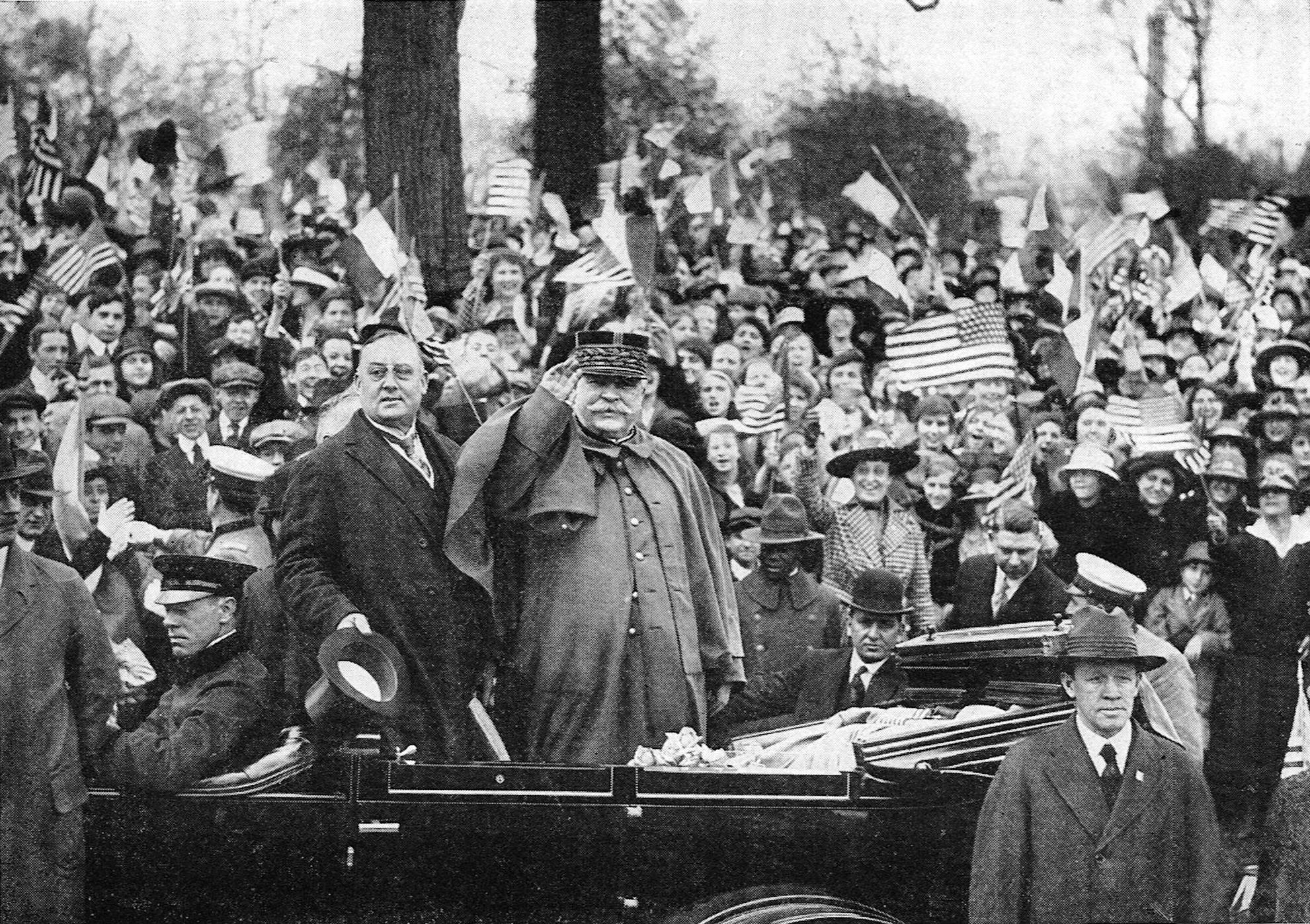
Mayor Smith and Marshal Joffre. Photo by Frank W. Buhler. The French High Commission visits Philadelphia on 9 May 1917.

Of the seven poem titles, five are original to the work. Excerpts from President Wilson's April 2, 1917 address to Congress are also included. A copy of the pamphlet, inscribed by the author to President Wilson, is held at the Library of Congress.

"The American People to the Allies" references President Wilson's "too proud to fight" speech delivered on May 10, 1915 to 4,000 newly naturalized citizens in Convention Hall, Philadelphia, where he states, "there is such a thing as a man being too proud to fight ... as a nation being so right that it does not need to convince others by force that it is right." Mrs. Coates answers:

If they tell you that we think,
When the robber comes by night
And we see 'neath murderous Might
Innocence unfriended sink,
We should be "too proud to fight"—
Don't believe it!

"Under the Flag" was cited by the Hon. Isaac Siegel in an "Extension of Remarks" in the Appendix to the Congressional Record (Second Session of the 64th Congress of the United States, Vol. LIV) on 2 March 1917, under the title, "Arming of American Merchant Ships." "The Union of the Flags" paints a picture of the visit of the French High Commission to Philadelphia on May 9, 1917.

Elizabeth Clendenning Ring writes of Mrs. Coates' war poetry: "in the present world crisis, of special interest are her views on war, voiced in the poems scattered throughout her work, particularly those in the still more recent 'Pro Patria,' that burn with a passionate fervor of patriotism, as stirring as the roll of drums at dawn."
