= Caroline Earle White =

American animal rights advocate

- Born: Caroline Earle; 1833; Philadelphia, Pennsylvania
- Died: 1916 (aged 82–83)
- Known for: Anti-vivisection activism
- Spouse: Richard P. White (married 1856)
- Parent: Thomas Earle (father)
- Relatives: Pliny Earle I (grandfather), Ralph Earle

Caroline White (née Earle; 1833–1916) was an American philanthropist and anti-vivisection activist. She co-founded the Pennsylvania Society for the Prevention of Cruelty to Animals (PSPCA) in 1867, founded its women's branch (WPSPCA) in 1869, and founded the American Anti-Vivisection Society (AAVS) in 1883.

White was also an active clubwoman, and was involved in literary societies and women's suffrage, and worked with organizations that helped the poor obtain medical services.

== Background ==
=== Early life and education ===
Caroline Earle was born in Philadelphia on September 28, 1833, to Quaker parents Thomas Earle and Mary Hussey. Thomas Earle was a successful Philadelphia lawyer who was devoted to the abolitionist cause and often represented both free and fugitive African Americans. Earle also wrote the new constitution for Pennsylvania and was a candidate for vice president when the Anti-Slavery party had its first presidential ticket in 1840. Earle’s mother, Mary Hussey, was a cousin to Lucretia Mott and was an abolitionist and a suffragist.

Earle was educated on Nantucket Island in Massachusetts. She studied astronomy, and was well versed in Latin and spoke German, French, Italian, and Spanish. Her family’s wealth gave her many educational opportunities not available to other girls of the time.

=== Marriage ===
In 1856 Earle married attorney Richard P. White, a member of one of the most respected Catholic families in Pennsylvania. Richard White would later open a firm with Caroline’s brother, under the name Earle and White. After a year of study, Mrs. White converted to Catholicism. She and her husband had one son, Thomas Earle White.

After her marriage, White had many intellectual and humanitarian pursuits to occupy her time. She wrote and published several travel guides, short stories, and novels, including A Holiday in Spain and Norway, Love in the Tropics: A Romance of the South Seas, and An Ocean Mystery. Many of her works received critical acclaim. After her conversion to Catholicism, she became president of the St. Vincent’s Aid Society, an organization that donated medical services and supplies to poor and orphaned children. She also served as chairwoman of the Ladies Auxiliary and the American Catholic Historical Society, and as vice president of the Browning Society, a women’s literary club. She was also a supporter of women’s suffrage.

Involvement in such a wide range of reform movements was not unusual for middle-class women in the 19th century. In fact, White firmly believed that one social injustice could lead to another, as evidenced with her involvement with the Women’s Christian Temperance Union. In the 1878 annual report for the women’s branch of the Pennsylvania Society for the Prevention of Cruelty to Animals, she stated that much of the cruelty toward animals was due to alcohol. She said, “Ought we not then, in our desire to ameliorate the sufferings of our dumb friends, to add our efforts to those who are laboring for a reform in this manner?” The WPSPCA built water fountains in cities all over the country to provide men and animals a place to drink besides the local bar.

== Animal advocacy ==
=== Pennsylvania Society for the Prevention of Cruelty to Animals ===
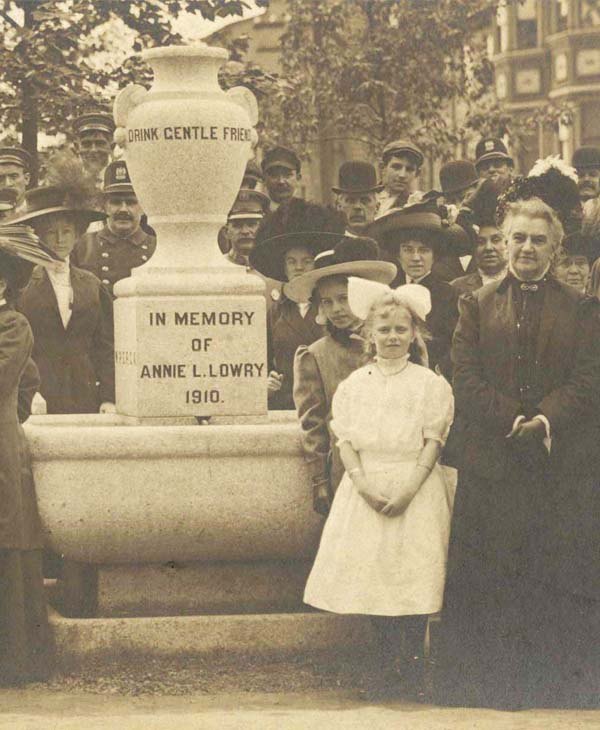
White stands before a newly dedicated horse water fountain

As a child, White often witnessed drivers beating their exhausted horses as they labored under heavy freight down Philadelphia’s streets. Later she recalled how such sights depressed and troubled her that she could no longer walk down certain streets. Richard White knew of his wife’s feelings and mentioned to her that she should become involved in the Royal Society for the Prevention of Cruelty to Animals (RSPCA); the world’s first animal welfare society.

Also inspired by the RSPCA, wealthy American Henry Bergh founded the American Society for the Prevention of Cruelty to Animals on April 10, 1866. In the summer of 1866, Caroline Earle White visited Henry Bergh in New York; she was seeking advice on how to begin a Philadelphia chapter of the SPCA. Bergh told her she should begin like he did, obtaining patronage of the city’s most prominent individuals. White drafted a petition calling for the creation of a Philadelphia chapter of SPCA, and secured dozens of signatures and pledges of financial support. Unknown to her, at the same time two other Philadelphians were trying to organize a Philadelphia SPCA: M. Richards Muckle, business manager of the Philadelphia Public Ledger, and S. Morris Waln. Finally brought together by Henry Bergh, S. Morris Waln provided financial support while White and Muckle, with Richard White’s assistance, drafted the group’s charter and corresponding laws. On June 21, 1868, the Pennsylvania Society for the Prevention of Cruelty to Animals was founded. S. Morris Waln was elected president, but White was excluded from an official position. Her husband served on the board of managers and most likely spoke for her.

=== Women's Humane Society ===
Although women played major roles in American humane organizations; establishing, funding, and volunteering, they were barred from true leadership roles. To remedy their lack of autonomy many women began to form women’s branches of preexisting groups. White founded the Women’s Humane Society (also known as the Women’s Pennsylvania Society for the Prevention of Cruelty to Animals or WPSPCA) in 1869. Early on the WPSPCA took on many animal issues, such as homeless dogs and cats, by opening America’s first animal shelter in 1869. The shelter also employed three cruelty officers, men authorized to prevent and punish animal abuse.

White and fellow WPSPCA member

WPSPCA supporters also expressed their animal welfare concerns through campaigns and legislation. White urged her members to boycott cruel carriage horse companies and to place malicious drivers under citizens arrest. In 1909, the group, along with other city humanitarians, secured legislation forbidding the sale or purchase of disabled work horses. White’s organization successfully passed the Twenty-eight Hour Law in 1871, a mandate that required railway companies to provide facilities to feed, water and rest animals in transit every 28 hours. Immediately the WPSPCA sent agents to assess the railways’ adherence and prosecute any offenders. In 1896 the Reading Railroad was charged with transporting a shipment of horses for 52 hours without food or water. The railroad was found guilty and the Reading officials were charged $200, setting an important precedent. White viewed the 28-hour law as the crowning achievement of her life. The WPSPCA also advocated against blood sports such as; fighting dogs and roosters, animal baiting (tethering an animal and allowing other animals to attack), gander pulling (riders on horseback attempt to decapitate a bird that has been greased and poised), pigeon shoots, and fox hunts.

The Women's Humane Society still lives out Caroline Earle White's beliefs and efforts to this day. Operating out of Bensalem, PA, the Women's Humane Society has managed to save, heal, and find homes for animals in the Delaware Valley for over 145 years. The Caroline Earle White Veterinary Hospital provides a range of healthcare services for dogs, cats and other small domestic animals as part of their commitment to maintaining the health and well-being of animals in the community.

=== American Anti-Vivisection Society ===
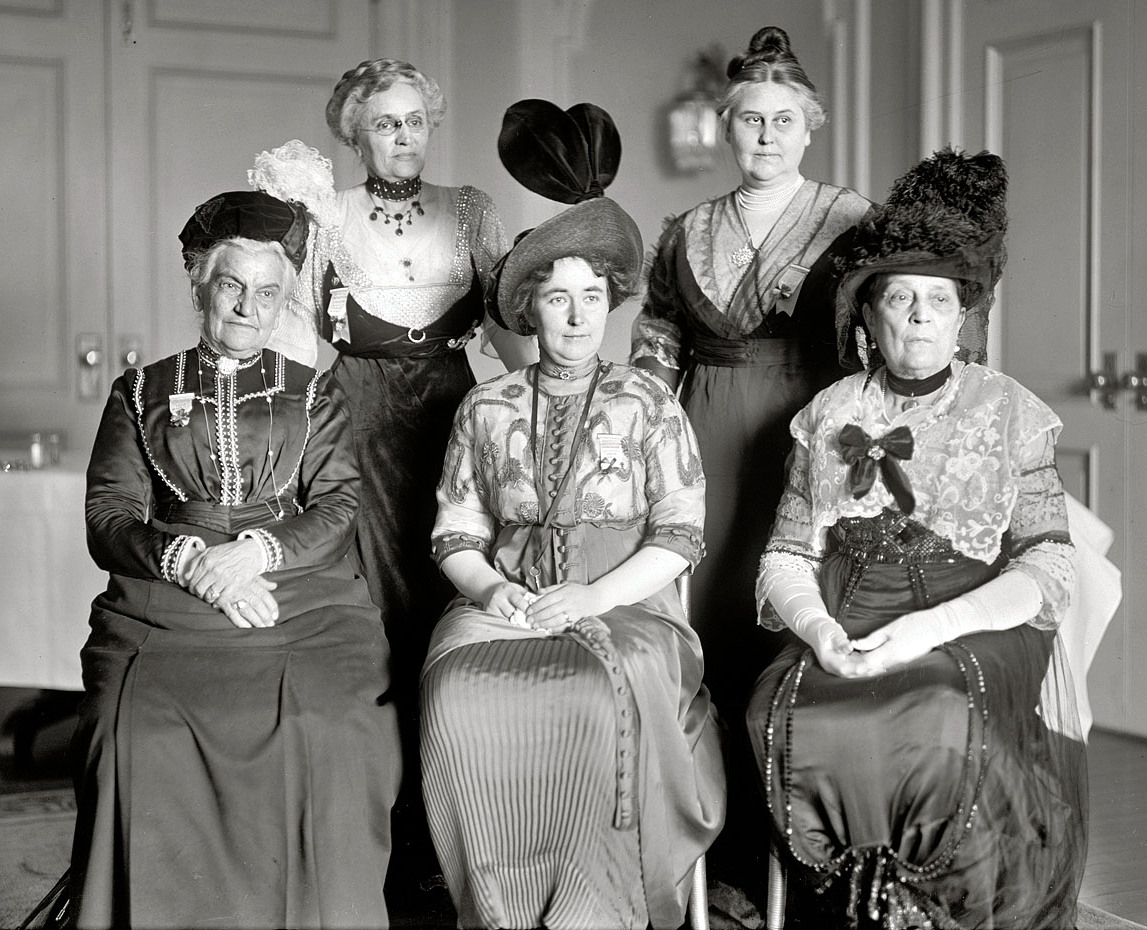
Caroline Earle White (front row, left) at the International Anti-Vivisection Congress in Washington, D.C., December 1913. (Left to right, back row: Mrs. Clinton Pinckney Farrell, Florence Pell Waring. Front row: Caroline Earl White, Lizzy Lind af Hageby, Mrs. Robert G. Ingersoll)

In 1871, physician S. Weir Mitchell wrote a letter to White requesting that the WPSPCA relinquish unwanted dogs from their shelter to his research hospital, for experimental purposes. Horrified, White called an Executive Committee meeting which resulted in a strenuous resolution protesting vivisection. This action would lead White into several controversies with many prominent scientists.

Frances Power Cobbe, British antivivisectionist and feminist, advised White to create an organization that would address the use of animals in testing, research and education. In 1883, she founded the American Anti-Vivisection Society (AAVS), the first of its kind in the United States. Although the group harbored an absolutist stance, AAVS initially pursued a more flexible approach to attempt to end the practice. The board of directors was mainly composed of physicians.

The organization utilized the support of celebrities, politicians, and writers, including Mark Twain, to validate the issue and raise awareness. The American Anti-Vivisection Society sponsored traveling exhibits depicting what they considered to be the horrors involved in animal testing. One important stop was the 1893 Chicago World’s Fair. Volunteers passed out millions of leaflets addressing the topics of pets stolen for research and the inadequate housing provided for lab animals. Partnering with the Massachusetts SPCA, AAVS successfully campaigned to ban vivisection in elementary and secondary schools in Massachusetts. Other states soon followed suit.

== Later life ==
White is not viewed as an active participant in the suffrage movement. However, throughout the 1890s, she wrote for, and was written about in the Philadelphia journal Woman’s Progress. The publication ran regular articles in support of women’s suffrage, and she was well known among suffragettes. Her founding of the WPSPCA and AAVS encouraged women to pursue roles in society typically occupied by men.

White died at her summer home in Nantucket, Massachusetts, on September 7, 1916. White's niece, Philadelphia poet Florence Earle Coates, reflected on her aunt: "She was a great woman with the heart of a little child. Her works praise her; the millions of God's creatures whom she has saved from suffering sing her praise. Where she has gone the recognition of this world counts for little. She has gone where the merciful are blessed, where the pure in heart see God."

== Selected publications ==
- An Answer to Dr. Keen's Address Entitled "Our Recent Debts to Vivisection" (1886)

== See also ==
- List of animal rights advocates
