= American Anti-Vivisection Society =

Pennsylvania-based organization

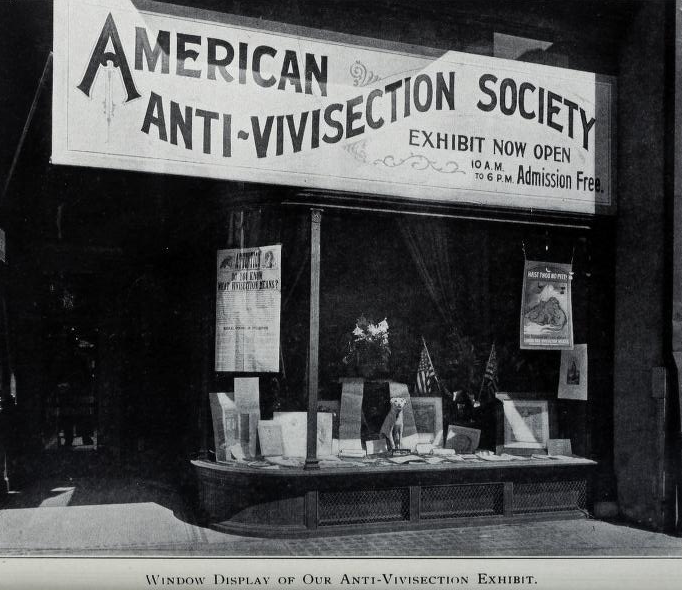
- American Anti-Vivisection Society exhibit in 1909
- Formation: 1883
- Founders: Caroline Earle White, Adele Biddle
- Headquarters: 801 Old York Road, Suite 204; Jenkintown, Pennsylvania address, 19046
- President: Sue A. Leary
- Website: www.aavs.org

The American Anti-Vivisection Society (AAVS) is an Abington Township, Montgomery County, Pennsylvania-based animal protectionism organization created with the goal of eliminating a number of different procedures done by medical and cosmetic groups in relation to animal cruelty in the United States. It seeks to help the betterment of animal life and human-animal interaction through legislation reform. It was the first anti-vivisection organization founded in the United States.

== History ==
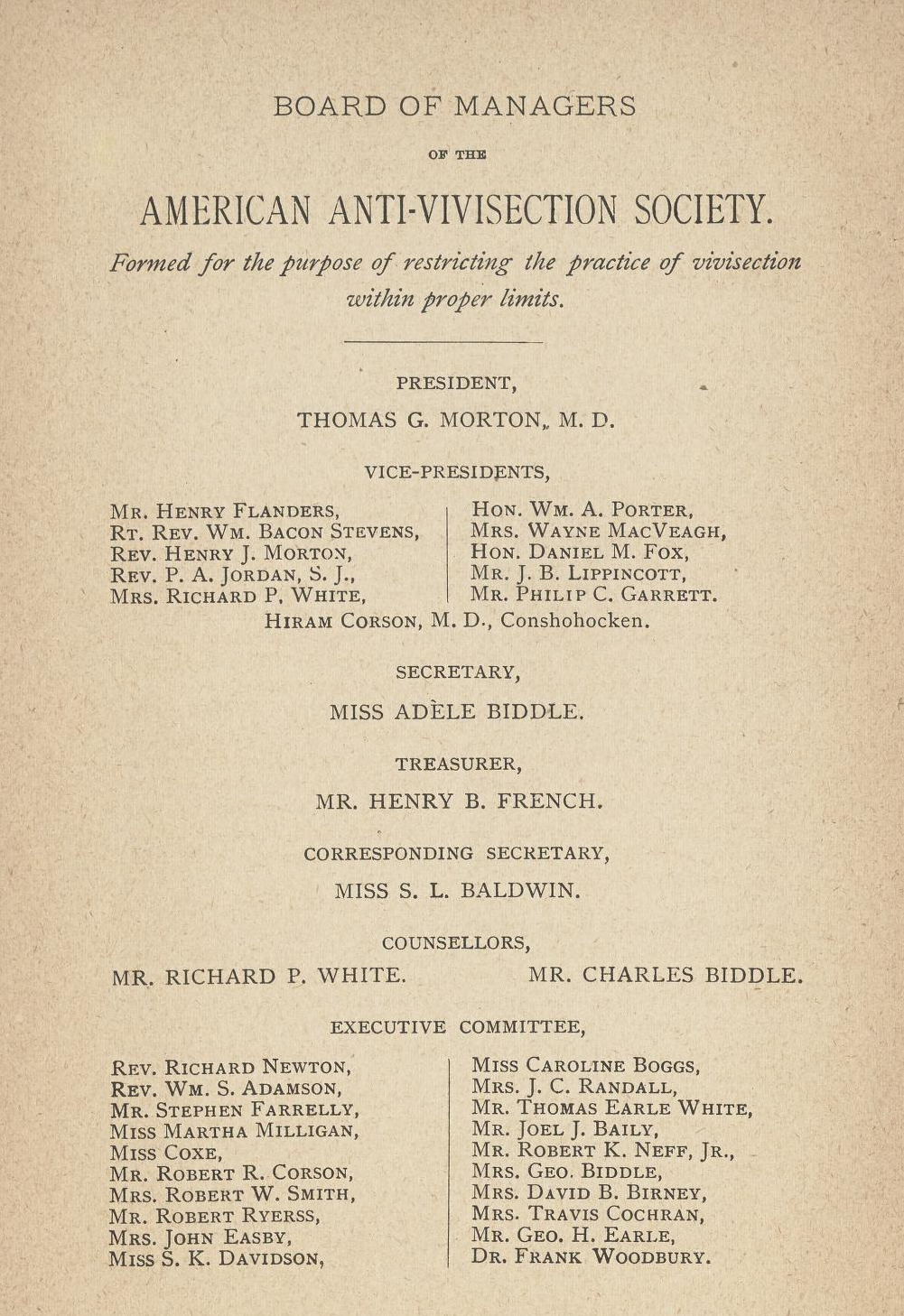
American Anti-Vivisection Society Board of Managers in 1884

The American Anti-Vivisection Society was founded by Caroline Earle White and Adele Biddle in 1883 in Philadelphia. The group was inspired by Britain's recently passed Cruelty to Animals Act 1876. Caroline White corresponded with Frances Power Cobbe, the woman who led the Victoria Street Society and had the Cruelty of Animals Act passed. The Society advocated complete abolition of vivisection in scientific testing. The first two members – Caroline Earle White and Mary Frances Lovell – worked with their husbands in the Pennsylvania Society to Prevent Cruelty to Animals (PSPCA), yet felt that their capabilities extended beyond what the PSPCA had to offer and, in 1869, founded the Women's Branch of the PSPCA (today known as the Women's Humane Society). The AAVS launched leaflet campaigns, held marches and recruited legislative advocates.

The first American animal testing facilities were opened in the 1860s and 1870s, much to the dismay of animal rights pioneers. The biggest concern of the AAVS was the implementation of vivisection in medical testing. Mark Twain's sketch "A Dog's Tale" was used by the Anti-Vivisection Society in its campaign against that practice. Additionally, it was issued by the British Anti-Vivisection Society as a pamphlet shortly after it was first published in Harper's Magazine in late 1903. In 1908, the AAVS tried to pass anti-vivisection legislation in Pennsylvania but was defeated by the "determination" of the medical profession.

In the 1920s the AAVS sponsored a humane alternative to fur, a synthetic fur known as "humanifur". The AAVS gained medical support but remained at odds with the American Medical Association (AMA), who argued that vivisection was critical to furthering medical advances. Anti-vivisectionists spent the next three decades trying to achieve legislation at state level but only succeeded on a national scale until the 1960s.

In 1962, Owen B. Hunt president of the AAVS argued against regulation of vivisection and stated that the "American Anti-Vivisection Society stands, as it always has done, for abolition of vivisection on the ground that it is wrong, cruel and fruitless".

The AAVS has consistently worked on educating the public on issues regarding animal cruelty as well as worked with the U.S. Federal government in passing legislations for animal rights.

== Publications ==
The organization's earliest publication was a magazine created in 1892 entitled the Journal of Zoöphily. Mary Frances Lovell was its associate editor. The Journal of Zoöphily informed its readers of recent vivisection and animal protectionism issues. The magazine published articles about animal intelligence, "hero dogs" and the loyal character of animals. It noted that animal cruelty was a sign of the decline of morality in society. The publication changed its name a number of times, from The Starry Cross in 1922, The A-V in 1939, and resting finally with AV Magazine some years after that. Margaret M. Halvey secretary of the AAVS was managing editor of The A-V for 47 years. The AAVS has had radio programs, such as "Have You a Dog?" as well as occasional spots and commercials on radio and television.

== Education ==
Animalearn was created in 1990 and is the AAVS' educational department. The group intends to illustrate how science and biology can be taught in schools without actually using animals, like with dissection in the classroom. Animalearn conducts free workshops with educators nationwide to show how to teach science without the use of animals, as well as trying to incorporate animal-rights, in concept and practice, into the curriculum and educational environment of the school setting. The group has created what they call the Science Bank which is a program of "new and innovative life science software and educational products that enable educators and students to learn anatomy, physiology, and psychology lessons without harming animals, themselves, or the Earth."

== Presidents ==
Presidents of the American Anti-Vivisection Society
1883–1884	Henry Flanders
1884–1887	Thomas G. Morton
1887–1891	William R. D. Blackwood
1891–1904	Matthew D. Woods
1904–1911	Floyd W. Tomkins
1911–1950	Robert R. Logan
1950–1978	Owen B. Hunt
1978–1990	William A. Cave
1990–present	Sue A. Leary

== See also ==
- Canadian Anti-Vivisection Society
- List of animal rights groups
