= Florence Van Leer Earle Coates =

American writer and poet (1850-1927)

Florence Earle Coates
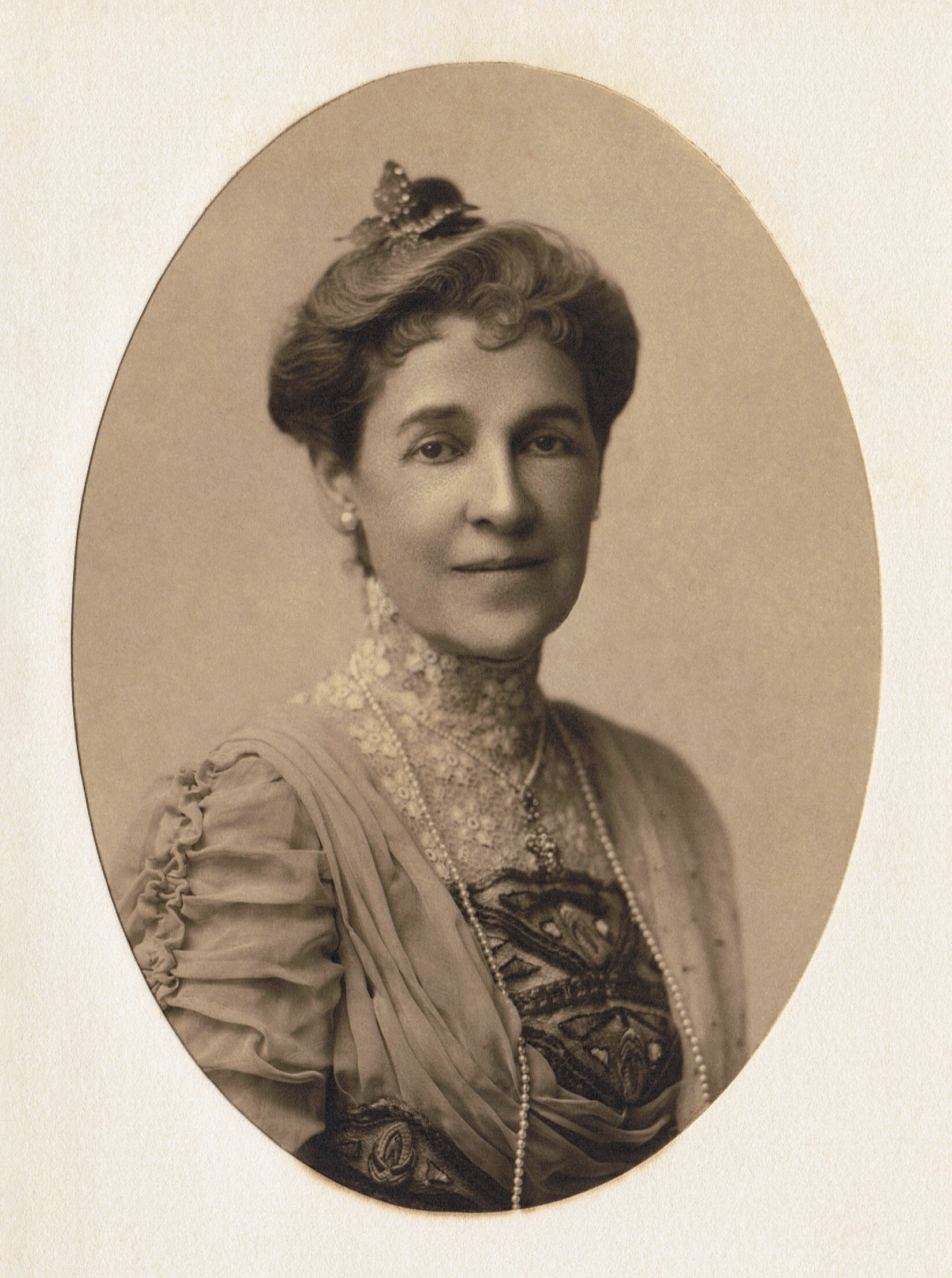
- Florence Van Leer Earle Coates, pre-1916
- Born: Florence Van Leer Earle; July 1, 1850; Philadelphia, Pennsylvania, U.S.
- Died: April 6, 1927 (aged 76); Hahnemann Hospital, Philadelphia, Pennsylvania, U.S.
- Resting place: Church of the Redeemer, Bryn Mawr, Pennsylvania, U.S.
- Occupations: Poet; Philanthropist
- Spouses: William Nicholson (m. 1872; died 1877); Edward Hornor Coates (m. 1879; died 1921)
- Relatives: George Hussey Earle Sr. (father); George Howard Earle II (brother); Thomas Earle (grandfather); Samuel Van Leer (great-grandfather); Anthony Wayne (great-uncle)

Florence Van Leer Nicholson Coates (née Earle; July 1, 1850 – April 6, 1927) was an American poet whose prolific output was published in dozens of literary magazines, some of it set to music. She was mentored by the English poet Matthew Arnold, with whom she maintained a lasting friendship. She was famous for her many nature poems, inspired by the flora and fauna of the Adirondacks, where she and her husband Edward Hornor Coates maintained a summer camp. She was elected poet laureate by the State Federation of Women's Clubs (Pennsylvania) in 1915.

== Biography ==
Florence Van Leer Earle was born in Philadelphia, Pennsylvania, the eldest daughter of lawyer George Hussey Earle Sr. and his wife, "Fanny" (née Frances Van Leer). She was the granddaughter of noted abolitionist and philanthropist Thomas Earle and a member of the influential Van Leer family. She gained fame both at home and abroad for her works of poetry, which were widely published in literary magazines such as the Atlantic Monthly, Scribner's Magazine, The Literary Digest, Lippincott's, The Century Magazine, and Harper's. Many of her poems were set to music by notable composers such as Amy Beach. She attended school in New England under the instruction of abolitionist and teacher Theodore Dwight Weld, and would further her education abroad at the Convent of the Sacred Heart in Paris (Rue de Varenne), and by studying music in Brussels under noted instructors of the day.

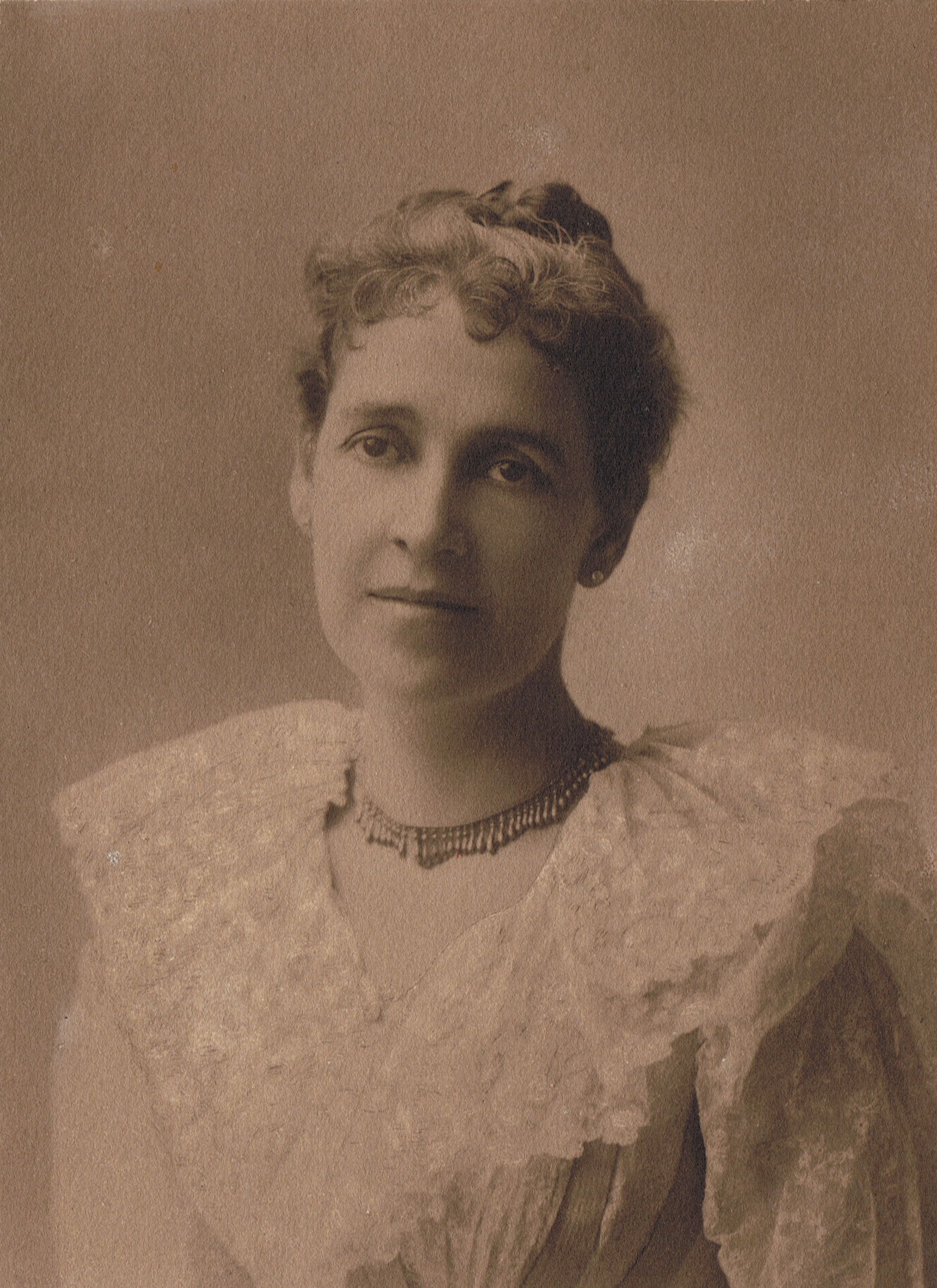
Coates, pre-1894

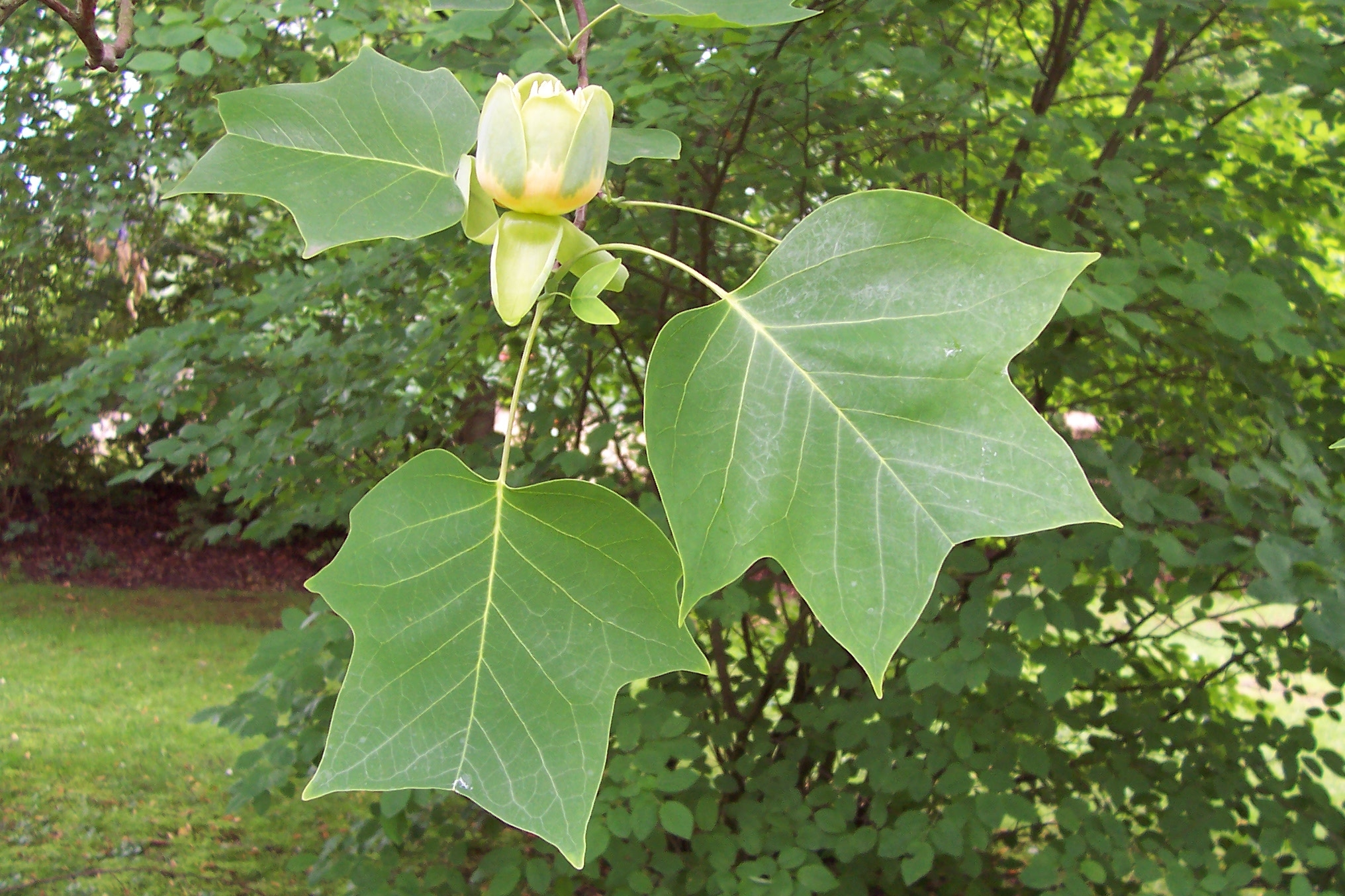
Tulip-tree "My remembrance of our last visit and of your tulip-trees and maples I shall never lose ..." —Matthew Arnold, in a letter to Coates

Literary and social critic Matthew Arnold both encouraged and inspired Coates's writing of poetry. He was a guest at the Coates' Germantown home when his lecture tours brought him to Philadelphia. Coates and Arnold first met in New York during Arnold's first visit and lecture tour of America, at the home of Andrew Carnegie, "where they formed a lasting friendship". The tour (which lasted from October 1883 to March 1884) brought Arnold to Philadelphia in December 1883, where he lectured at Association Hall on the topics of the "Doctrine of the Remnant" and on "Emerson". His second visit and tour of America took place in 1886, and brought him to Philadelphia in early June where he was again hosted by the Coates and spoke on the topic of "Foreign Education" at the University of Pennsylvania chapel. Arnold wrote to Coates in 1887 and 1888 from his home at Pains Hill Cottage in Cobham, Surrey, England describing his remembrance of and fondness for her "tulip-trees and maples" at her Germantown home, "Willing Terrace". Rarely did Coates write or publish prose work, but in April 1894 and again in December 1909, she contributed personal reminiscences of her mentor to The Century and Lippincott's magazines respectively.

Between 1887 and 1912, Coates published over two dozen poems in The Century Magazine. Her correspondence between Century editor Richard Watson Gilder and others is documented at the New York Public Library Digital Collections website. In one letter dated March 12, 1905, Coates submitted to Mr. Gilder a poem she wrote after being inspired by a photograph of Helen Keller holding a rose which was published in The Century the previous January. Coates requested that, if published, the poem also be accompanied by a copy of the photograph, and shared that Ms. Keller sent word that she "accord[ed] [Coates] any permission" to use the photo for that purpose. The poem, "Helen Keller with a Rose", was published in the July 1905 issue—without the accompanying photograph, but with reference to the issue in which it first appeared.

The Coates' often spent their summer months in the Adirondacks, where they maintained "Camp Elsinore" — their summer camp by the Upper St. Regis Lake. It was there that they entertained, rested and escaped the humidity of Philadelphia summers, welcoming friends such as Otis Skinner, Violet Oakley, Henry Mills Alden, and Agnes Repplier. In the early 1900s, the Coates seasonally opened their camp to Anna Roosevelt Cowles ("Bamie")—the elder sister of Theodore Roosevelt. Among Cowles's visitors during her stays at Elsinore was Alice Roosevelt, President Theodore Roosevelt's daughter. Many of Coates's nature poems were inspired by the flora and fauna of the Adirondacks. Of her "spot in the mountains", Coates sings:

There's a cabin in the mountains, where the fare, dear,
Is frugal as the cheer of Arden blest;
But contentment sweet and fellowship are there, dear,
And Love, that makes the feast he honors—best!

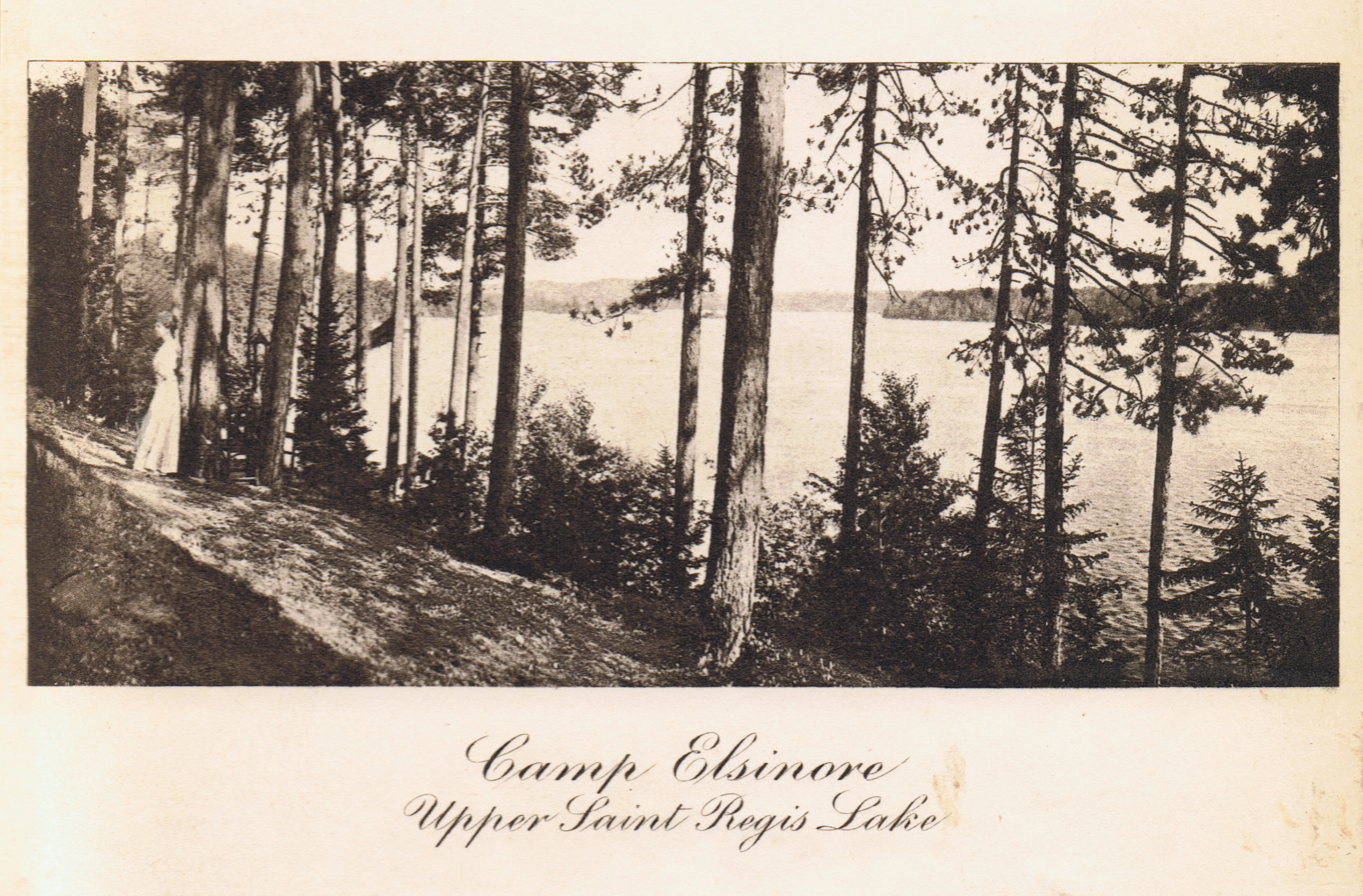
Upper St. Regis Lake There's a lake upon the mountains...—FEC

In the March 1913 issue of Lippincott's Monthly Magazine, noted anthologist and poet, William Stanley Braithwaite (1878–1962), gives a detailed nine-page review of Coates's poetry, relating how "she draws from the Olympian world figures that typify some motive or desire in human conduct, and in the modern world the praise of men and women, heroic in attainment or sacrifice; or laments events that effect social and ethical progress, showing how beneficently she has brought her art, without modifying in the least its abstract function as a creator of beauty and pleasure, into the service of profound and vital problems". Much of Coates's later published work was written during the years spanning World War I and showcased her concern for such "profound and vital problems" as her voice joined the chorus of "singers" in support of American involvement in the war—evidenced in her privately published pamphlet of war poetry, Pro Patria (1917). Coates also penned several other works of fugitive (i.e. uncollected) verse, much of which is patriotic and war-related, describing the selfless sacrifices made by soldiers and citizens alike for the cause of freedom and liberty.

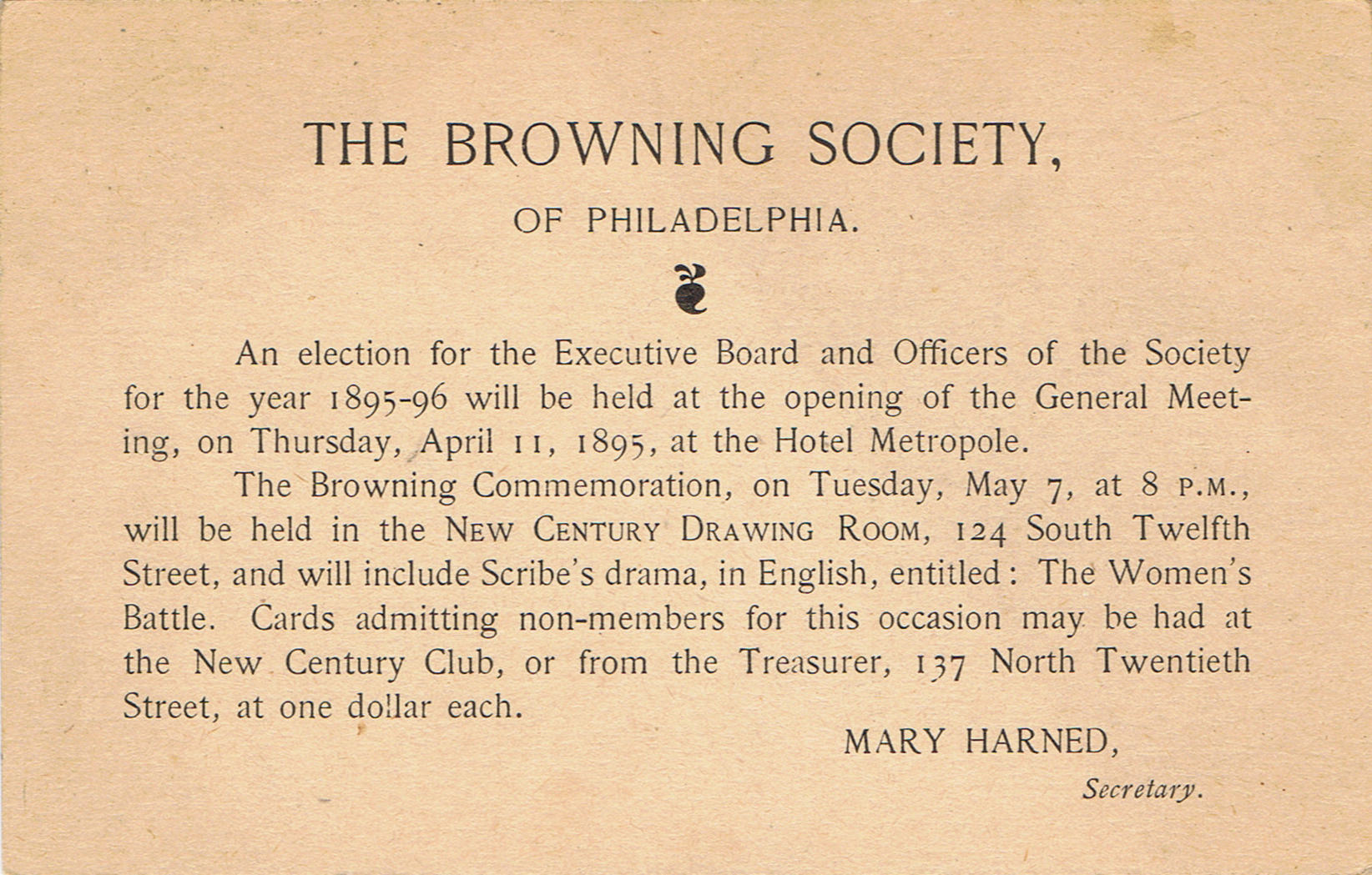
Invitation to the 1895–96 Browning Society elections, the year Coates was elected president.

Coates was a founder of the Contemporary Club of Philadelphia in 1886; one of twenty founders of the Society of Mayflower Descendants in the Commonwealth of Pennsylvania in 1896—herself being a ninth generation descendant of Pilgrim John Howland; and twice president of the Browning Society of Philadelphia from 1895 to 1903, and again from 1907 to 1908. In 1915, Coates was unanimously elected poet laureate by the State Federation of Women's Clubs (Pennsylvania).

Coates married William Nicholson in 1872. He died in 1877. On January 7, 1879, she married Edward Hornor Coates at Christ Church in Philadelphia. Edward Coates would eventually adopt Florence's daughter from her first marriage—Alice Earle Nicholson (born October 21, 1873). Florence and Edward had one child together in 1881, but the baby—Josephine Wisner Coates—died in infancy on March 5, 1881. Edward Coates was president of the Pennsylvania Academy of the Fine Arts from 1890 to 1906. He died on December 23, 1921.

In 1923, Coates presented The Edward H. Coates Memorial Collection to the Pennsylvania Academy of the Fine Arts in Philadelphia. The exhibition, representing French and American schools, included 27 paintings and 3 pieces of sculpture, and was displayed from November 4, 1923, to January 10, 1924.

Florence Earle Coates died at Hahnemann Hospital in Philadelphia on April 6, 1927, aged 76. She is buried at the Church of the Redeemer churchyard in Bryn Mawr, Pennsylvania alongside her husband and her brother George Howard Earle, Jr. and many of his descendants, including his son, former Pennsylvania Governor, George Howard Earle III — Florence's nephew.

== List of works ==
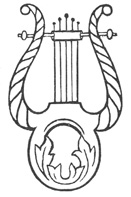
POEMS. (1898)
MINE AND THINE. (1904)
LYRICS OF LIFE. (1909)
THE UNCONQUERED AIR AND OTHER POEMS. (1912)
POEMS. 2 vols. (1916)
PRO PATRIA. (1917) Privately published.
Fugitive verse.
On Matthew Arnold. (1894, 1909)
INDEX OF TITLES
INDEX OF FIRST LINES
List of categorized lists of works.
Other works.

== Gallery ==
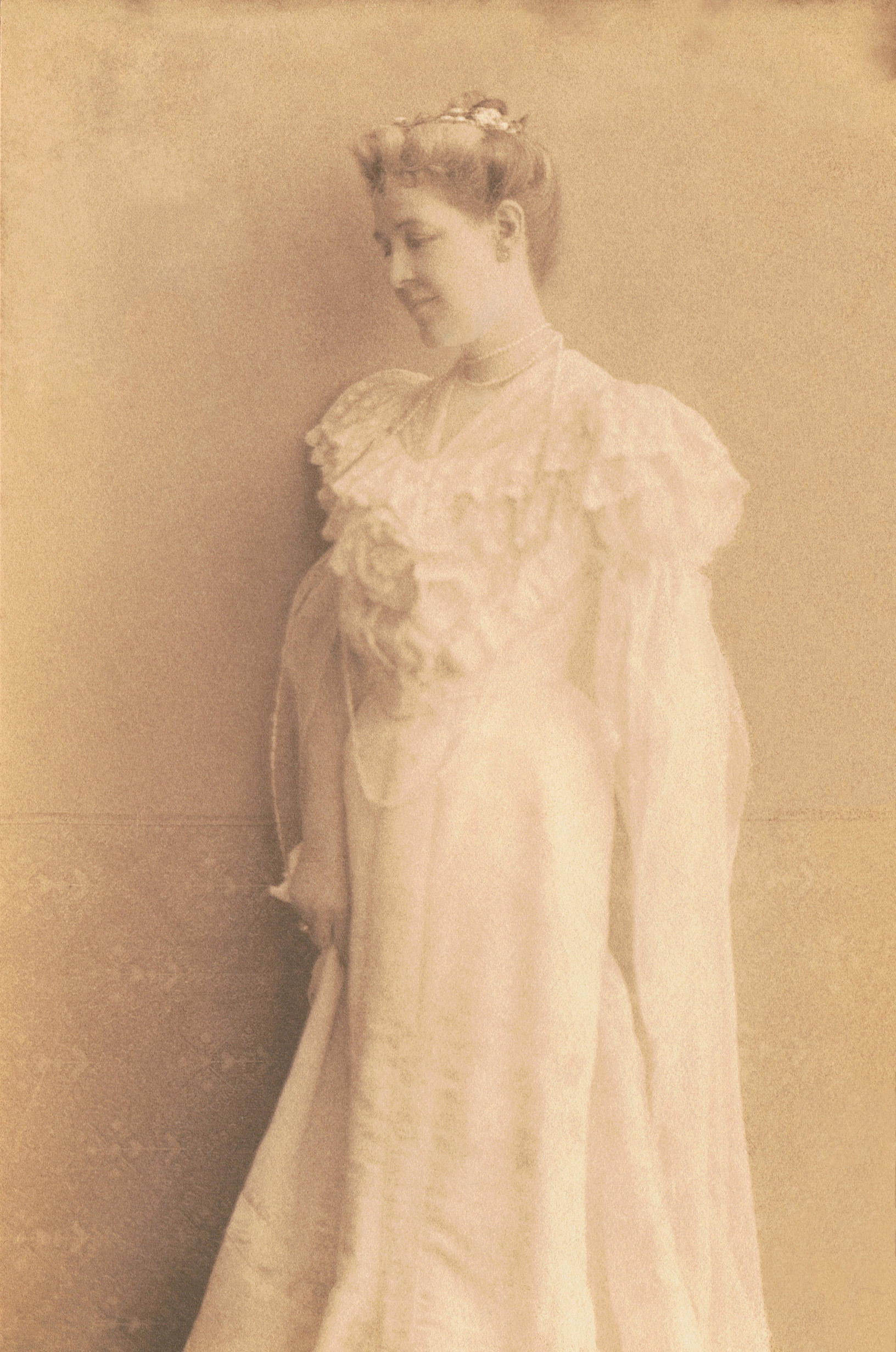
A platinum print photograph of Coates

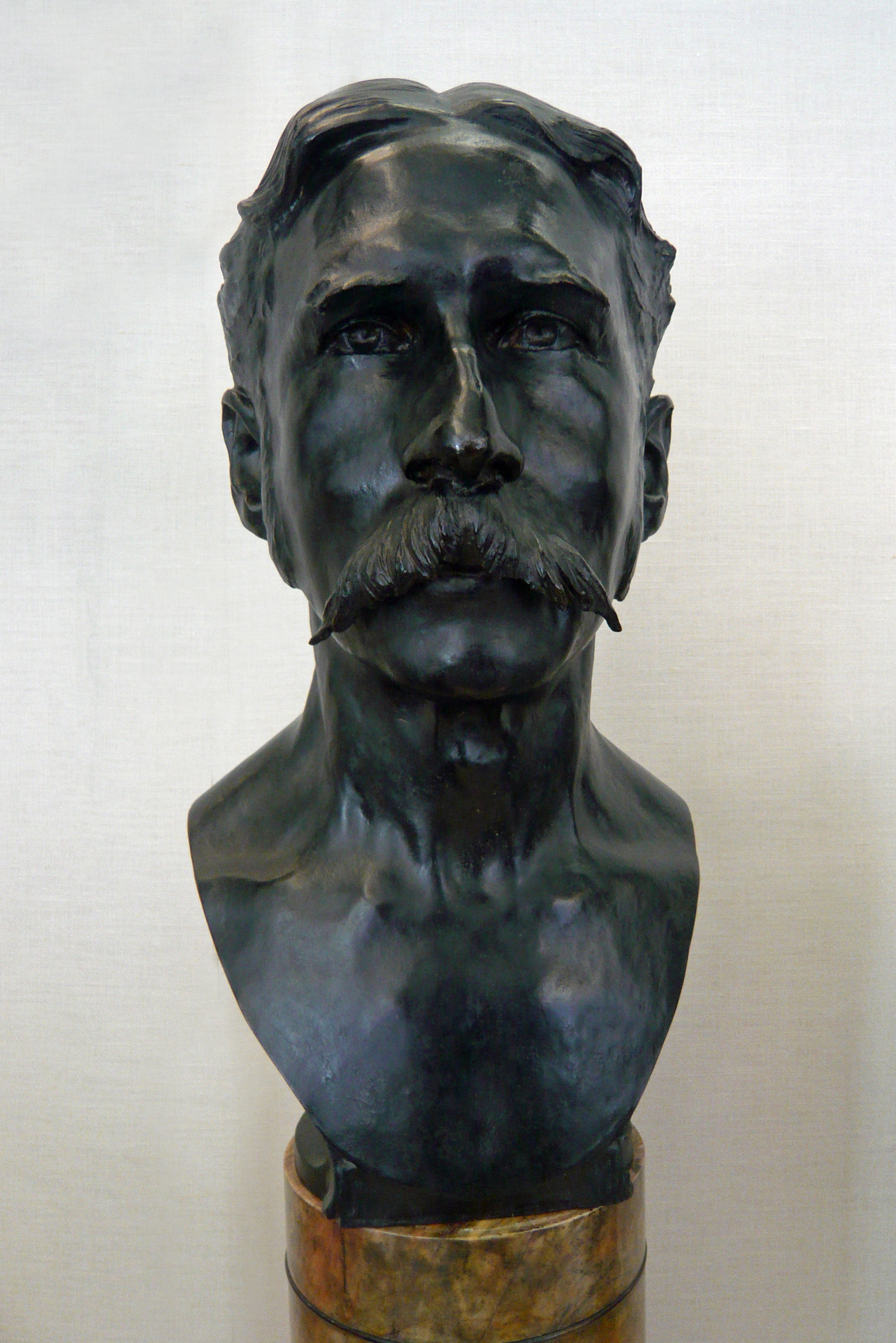
Edward Hornor Coates (1903) by Charles Grafly at the Pennsylvania Academy of the Fine Arts

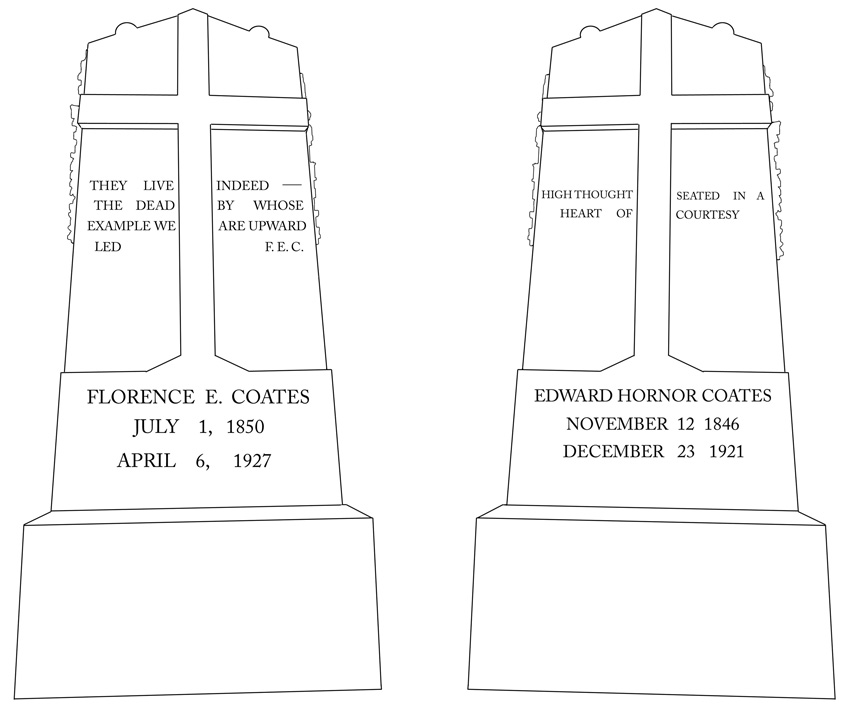
Digital drawing of the headstones of Coates and husband in Pennsylvania

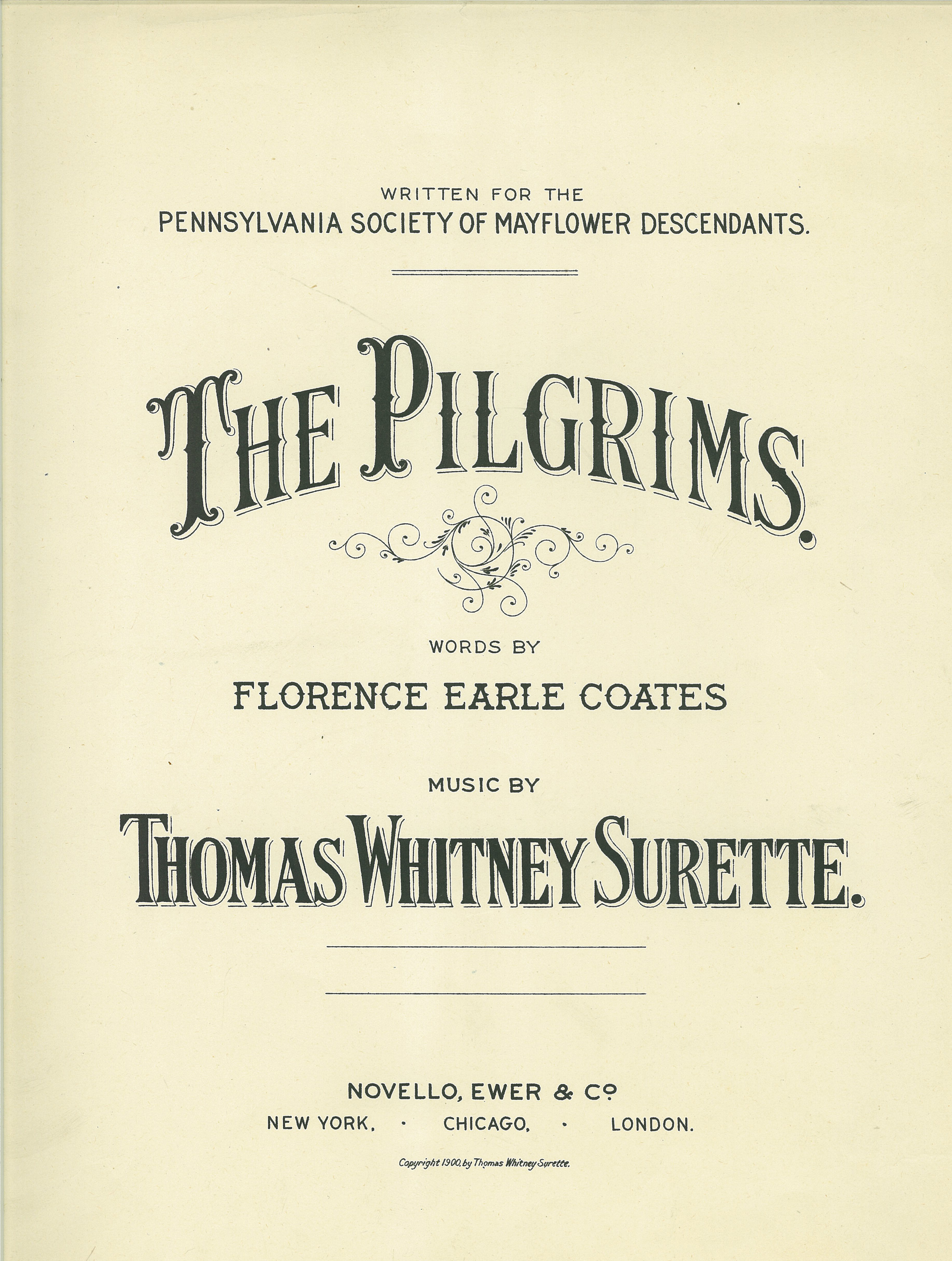
Hymn written for the Society of Mayflower Descendants in the Commonwealth of Pennsylvania (1900)

== Sources ==
- Russell, George W.E. (1895). Letters of Matthew Arnold, 1848-1888, Volume 2. Macmillan and Co.
