= Quaker Cemetery =

Cemetery in Leicester, Massachusetts, United States

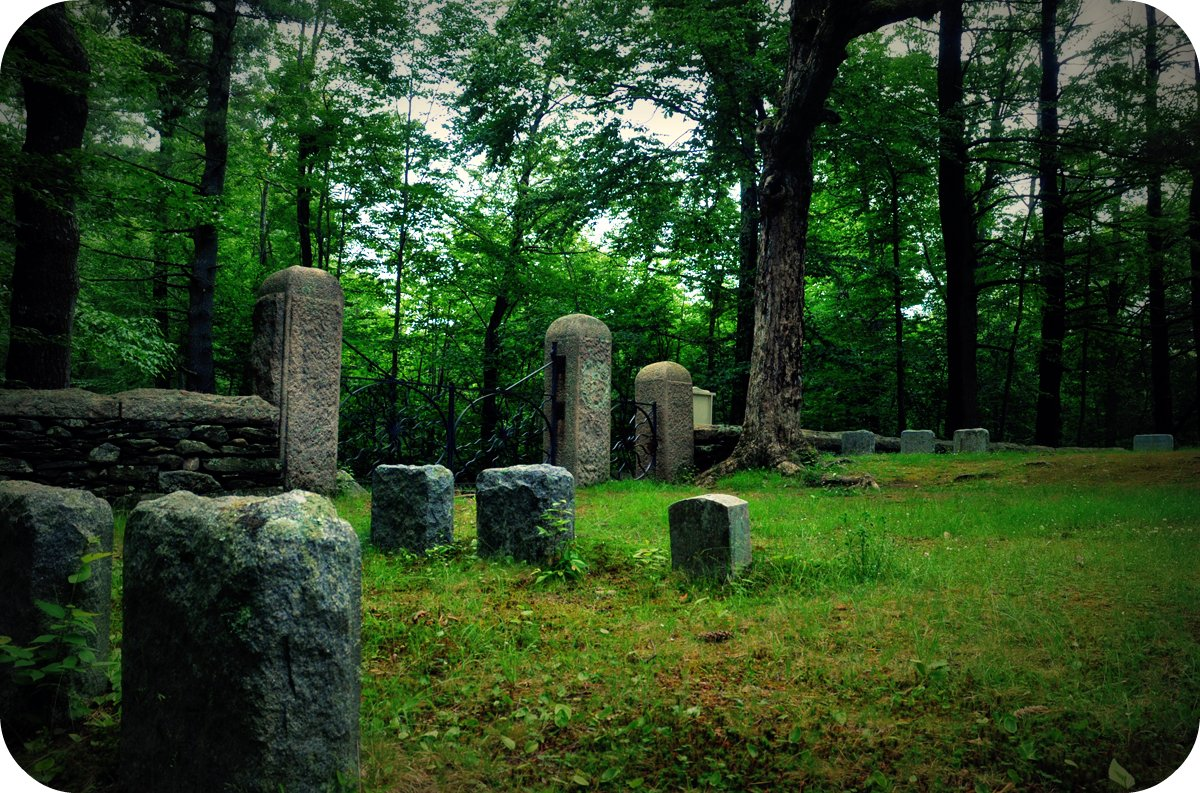
- Interactive map of Quaker Cemetery

Details
- Established: 1740
- Location: Leicester, Massachusetts
- Country: United States
- Coordinates: 42.2628°N 71.8967°W
- Type: Private
- Owned by: Worcester Friends Meeting
- Website: Worcester Friends Meeting
- Find a Grave: Quaker Cemetery

The Quaker Cemetery is a privately owned cemetery in Leicester, Massachusetts, established in 1740 and located at the site of the old meeting house of the Leicester Friends (Quakers) on Earle Street in the village of Manville. The cemetery is still in use and is now maintained by the Worcester Friends Meeting.

== History ==
Among the first Quakers in Leicester were the Ralph Earle family and the John Potter family. Ralph Earle moved to Leicester around 1717. Although he was probably the son of Quaker parents, he did not publicly declare himself Quaker until 1732 when the declaration allowed him to avoid a parish tax. His homestead and main farm lay on both sides of Mulberry Street in Leicester and included the slope where the Friends' meetinghouse and cemetery would be located.

The first burial, that of John Potter, was in 1740. A small meetinghouse was built on the property in 1741. It was replaced with a larger meetinghouse in 1791. At that time, the original meetinghouse was sold to Luther Ward, who moved it to another location (the intersection of Rutland Road and what was once called Tea Lane) and fitted it out for his residence. The more recent meetinghouse was still standing among the graves in 1860 but was no longer in use at that time as most of the Quakers had moved away, many to Worcester.

The first Southwick, Amasa, didn't arrive in Leicester until 1800 and had nothing to do with the founding of the cemetery in 1740. The Southwick family probably joined in 1810 or thereabouts and became one of the largest groups to be buried in the cemetery. The Leicester Quakers closed the meeting around 1850 and transferred it to the Worcester meeting.

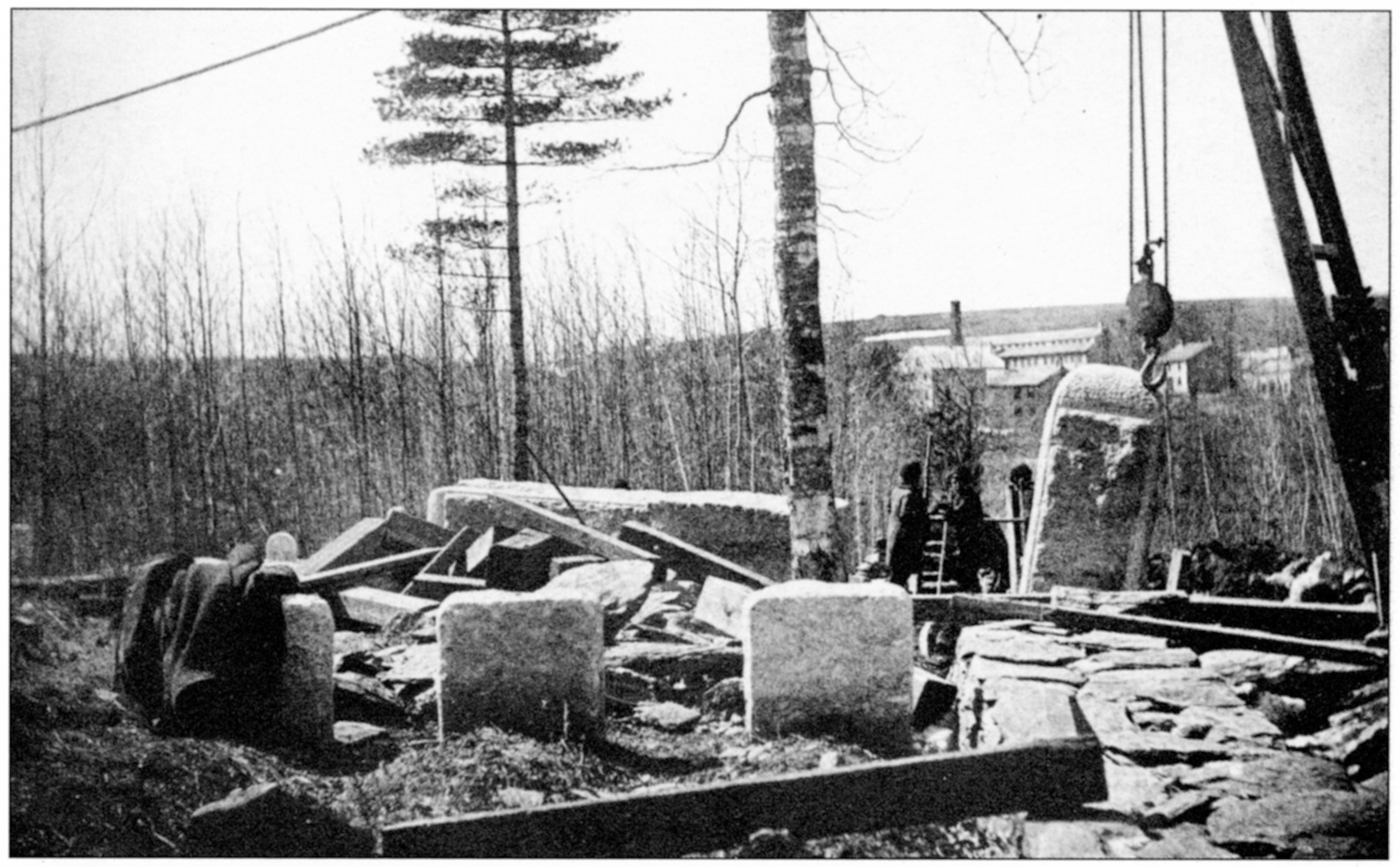
Construction of the gates, 1892–1894

The stone precinct wall, granite posts, and iron gates (since removed) were installed under the terms of a bequest made in 1892 by Dr. Pliny Earle, whose parents and other family members were buried there. The design of the gates was originally meant to represent the rays of the sun, but because of their fancied resemblance to a spider's web, the cemetery is sometimes referred to as the Spider Gates cemetery.

== Present day ==
The cemetery is still in use and is currently maintained by the Worcester Friends Meeting. The original gates have been removed, and the grounds contain gravestones dating back to the 18th century.

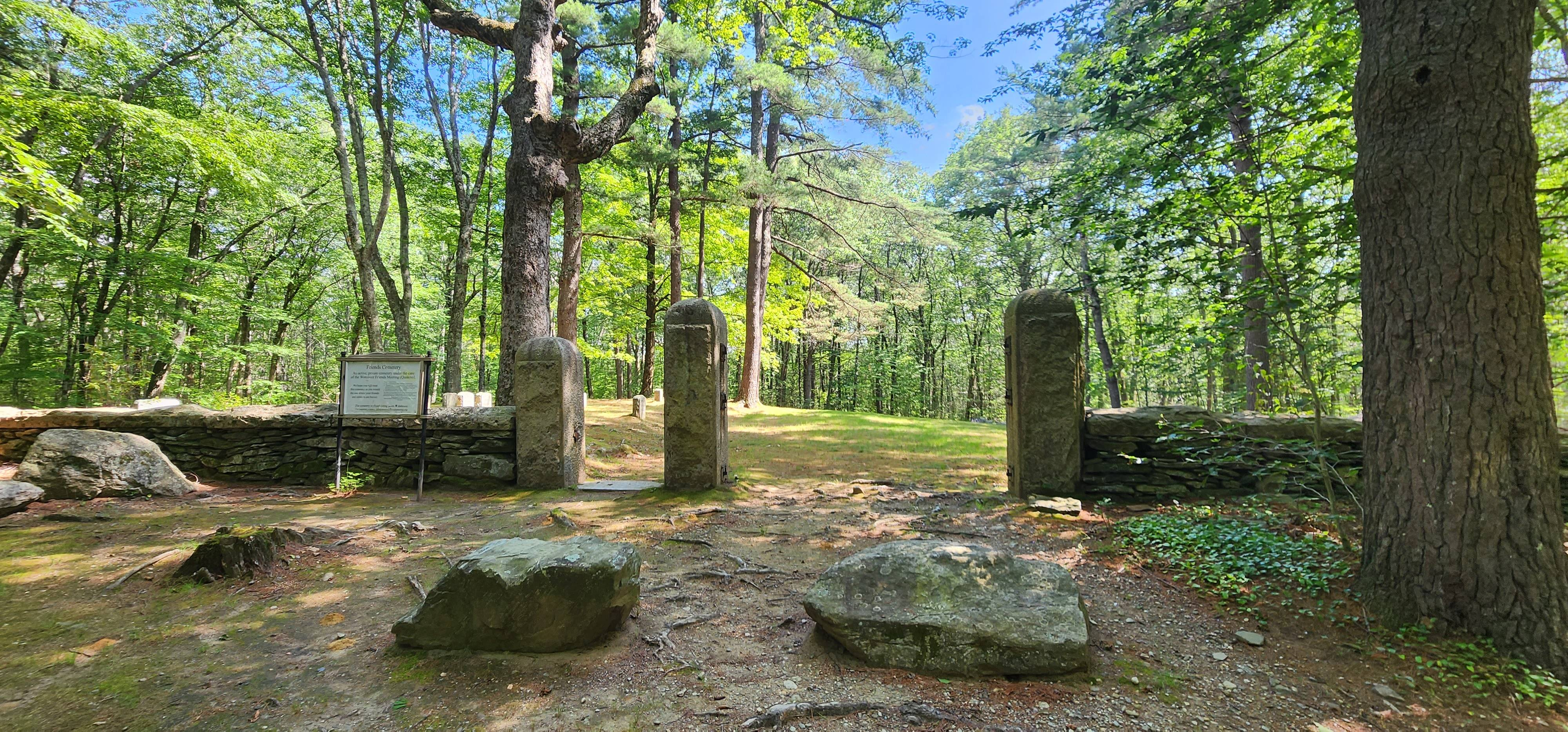
The entrance to Quaker Cemetery, 2025

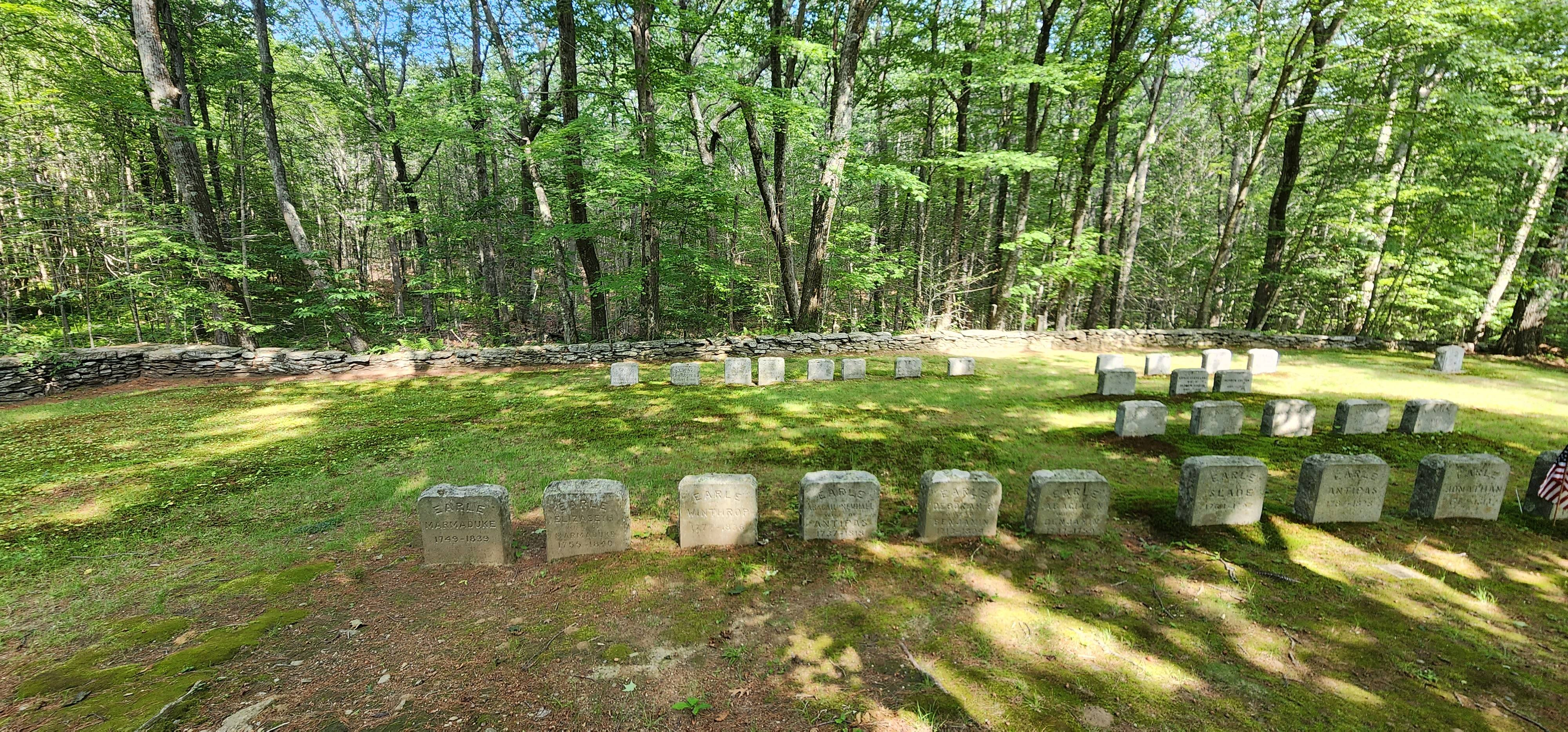
Graves of the Earle family at the Quaker Cemetery, 2025

== Notable interments ==
- Ralph Earle (American naval officer)
- Albert Southwick (historian)
- Pliny Earle I
- Stephen C. Earle
