= Tacitean studies =

Scholarship about the Roman historian Tacitus

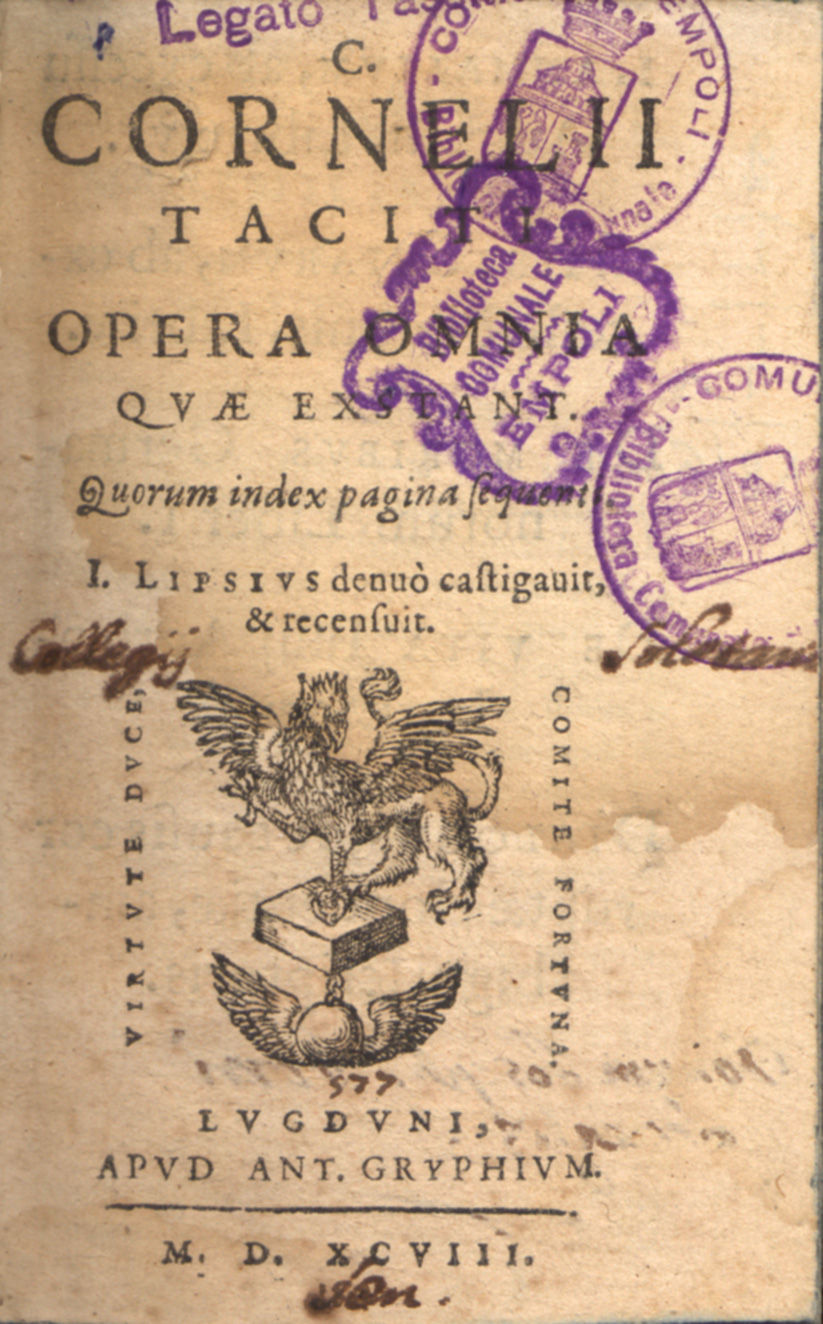
Justus Lipsius's 1598 edition of the complete works of Tacitus

Tacitean studies, is the term given to the research centred on the work of Tacitus (c. 56 – c. 120 AD), the ancient Roman historian. The political lessons taken from his work fall roughly into two camps (as identified by Giuseppe Toffanin): the "red Tacitists", who used him to support republican ideals, and the "black Tacitists", those who read his accounts as a lesson in monarchical realpolitik.

Though his work is the most reliable source for the history of his era, its factual accuracy is occasionally questioned: the Annals are based in part on secondary sources of unknown reliability, and there are some obvious minor mistakes (for instance confusing the two daughters of Mark Antony and Octavia Minor, both named Antonia). The Histories, written from primary documents and personal knowledge of the Flavian period, is thought to be more accurate, though Tacitus's hatred of Domitian seemingly colored its tone and interpretations.

== Antiquity and Middle Ages ==
Tacitus's contemporaries were well-acquainted with his work; Pliny the Younger, one of his first admirers, congratulated him for his better-than-usual precision and predicted that his Histories would be immortal: only a third of his known work has survived and then through a very tenuous textual tradition; we depend on a single manuscript for books I–VI of the Annales and on another one for the other surviving half (books XI–XVI) and for the five books extant of the Historiae. His books were clearly used by 2nd – early 3rd century historians such as Cassius Dio's report on Agricola's exploration of Britain, and Hegesippus may have borrowed from his account of the First Jewish–Roman War. His difficult historical methods and elliptic literary style, however, went unimitated except by Ammianus Marcellinus, who consciously set out to write a continuation of his works. His popularity waned with time: his unfavorable portrayals of the early emperors could not have earned him favor with Rome's increasingly autocratic rulers, and his obvious contempt for Judaism and Christianity (both troublesome foreign cults in the eyes of a 1st-century Roman aristocrat) made him unpopular among the early Church Fathers. The 3rd-century writer Tertullian, for example, blames him (incorrectly—see history of anti-Semitism) for originating the story that the Jews worshipped a donkey's head in the Holy of Holies and calls him "ille mendaciorum loquacissimus", 'the most loquacious of liars'.

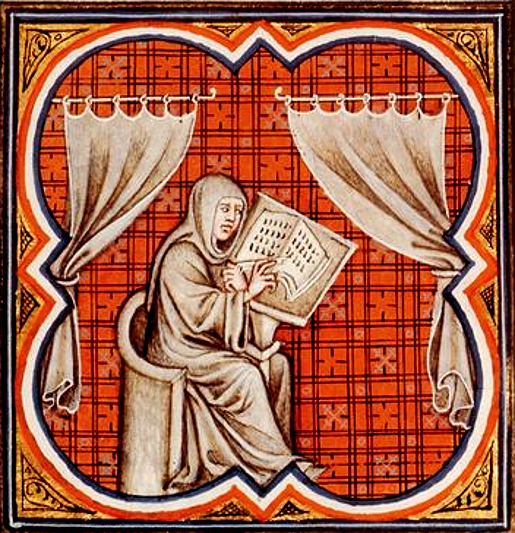
Monks like Einhard were the only readers of Tacitus for most of the Middle Ages.

In the 4th century there are scattered references to his life and work. Flavius Vopiscus, one of the supposed Scriptores Historiae Augustae, mentions him twice (Aurelian 2.1, Probus 2.7.) and names him among the disertissimi viri, the most eloquent men. Ammianus Marcellinus, as mentioned, started his history where Tacitus had finished. Jerome knew of him, and Sulpicius Severus either used his Annales as a source for passages on Nero or, according to Aurthur Drews, the passage in Sulpicius Severus's Chronicles later found its way into Annales. By the 5th century only a few authors seem aware of him: Sidonius Apollinaris, who admires him, and Orosius, who alternately derides him as a fool and borrows passages (including many that are otherwise lost) from his works. Cassiodorus and his disciple Jordanes (middle of the 6th century) make the last known antique references; Cassiodorus draws on parts of the Germania and Jordanes cites the Agricola, but both know the author only as Cornelius.

After Jordanes, Tacitus disappeared from literature for the better part of two centuries, and only four certain references appear until 1360. Two come from Frankish monks of the Carolingian Renaissance: the Annales Fuldenses from the monastery of Fulda used Tacitus's Annals, and Rudolf of Fulda borrowed from the Germania for his Translatio Sancti Alexandri. Some of Tacitus's works were known at Monte Cassino by 1100, where the other two certain references appear: Peter the Deacon's Vita Sancti Severi used the Agricola, and Paulinus Venetus, Bishop of Pozzuoli, plagiarized passages from the Annals in his mappa mundi. Hints and reminiscences of Tacitus appear in French and English literature, as well as German and Italian, from the 12th to the 14th century, but none of them is at all certain. It was not until Giovanni Boccaccio brought the manuscript of the Annals 11–16 and the Histories out of Monte Cassino to Florence, in the 1360s or 1370s, that Tacitus began to regain some of his old literary importance. His Annals survive only in single copies of two halves of the works, one from Fulda and one from Cassino.

== Italian Renaissance ==
Boccaccio's efforts brought the works of Tacitus back into public circulation—where they were largely passed over by the Humanists of the 14th and 15th centuries, who preferred the smooth style of Cicero and the patriotic history of Livy, who was by far their favorite historian. The first to read his works—they were four: Boccacio, Benvenuto Rambaldi, Domenico Bandini, and Coluccio Salutati—read them solely for their historical information and their literary style. On the merits of these they were divided. Bandini called him "[a] most eloquent orator and historian", while Salutati commented:

For what shall I say about Cornelius Tacitus? Although a very learned man, he wasn't able to equal those closest [to Cicero]. But he was even way behind Livy—whom he proposed to follow—not only in historical series but in imitation of eloquence.

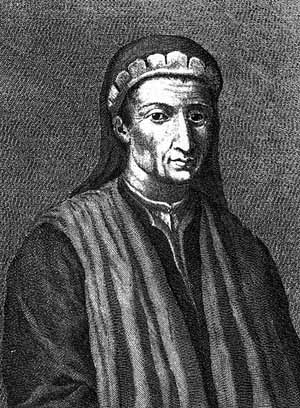
Leonardo Bruni, the first to use Tacitus as a source for political philosophy

The use of Tacitus as a source for political philosophy, however, began in this era, triggered by the Florentine Republic's struggle against the imperial ambitions of Giangaleazzo Visconti. Visconti's death from an illness did more than lift his siege of Florence; it sparked Leonardo Bruni to write his Panegyric to the City of Florence (c. 1403), in which he quoted Tacitus (Histories, 1.1) to buttress his republican theory that monarchy was inimical to virtue, nobility, and (especially) genius. The inspiration was novel—Bruni had probably learned of Tacitus from Salutati. The thesis likewise: Tacitus himself had acknowledged that the good emperors Nerva and Trajan posed no threat to his endeavors.

Tacitus, and the theory that Bruni based on him, played a vital role in the spirited debate between the republicans of Florence and the proponents of monarchy and aristocracy elsewhere. Guarino da Verona, in 1435, used the literary flowering of Augustus's era—which included Livy, Horace, Virgil, and Seneca—to argue against Bruni's contention; Gian Francesco Poggio Bracciolini countered with the argument that all the authors had been born during the waning years of the Roman Republic. Pier Candido Decembrio, a Milanese courtier, addressed the same argument to Bruni in the following year, which Bruni did not bother to rebut, the best counterargument having been made already. The rule of Cosimo de Medici, however, saw the end of these political readings of Tacitus, though his works were now readily available in the public library of Florence. Instead, scholars such as Leone Battista Alberti and Flavio Biondo used him in academic works on the history and architecture of 1st century Rome. His laconic style and bleak outlook remained unpopular.

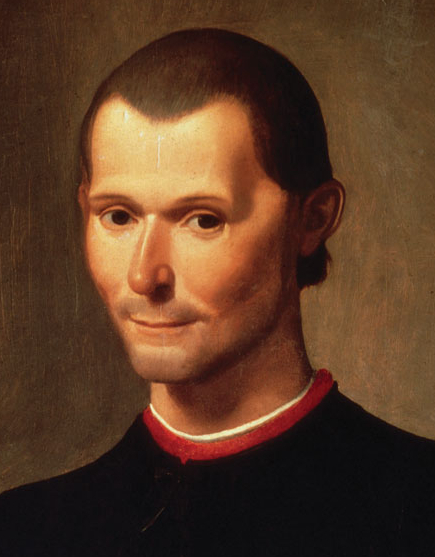
Niccolò Machiavelli seems to resemble Tacitus in his political realism.

At the beginning of the 15th century, following the expulsion of the Medici from Florence, their return, and the foreign invasions of Italy, Tacitus returned to prominence among the theorists of classical republicanism. Niccolò Machiavelli was the first to revive him, but not (at first) in the republican model which Bruni and others had followed. One quotation from the Annals (13.19) appears in The Prince (ch. 13), advising the ruler that "it has always been the opinion and judgment of wise men that nothing can be so uncertain or unstable as fame or power not founded on its own strength". The idealized Prince bears some resemblance to Tacitus's Tiberius; a few (most notably Giuseppe Toffanin) have argued that Machiavelli had made more use of Tacitus than he let on. In fact, though, Machiavelli had probably not read the first books of the Annals at that time—they were published after The Prince.

In his work focused mainly on republicanism, Discourses on the First Ten Books of Livy, Machiavelli returned to Bruni's republican perspective on Tacitus. Four overt references appear in the work. Chapter 1.10 follows Tacitus (Histories 1.1), and Bruni, on the chilling effects of monarchy. Chapter 1.29 quotes the Histories (4.3) on the burden of gratitude and the pleasure of revenge. Chapter 3.6 quotes Tacitus: "men have to honor things past but obey the present, and ought to desire good Princes, but tolerate the ones they have". 3.19 twists a line from Tacitus (3.55) into something very similar to Machiavelli's famous maxim that it is better for a prince to be feared than loved. (The original made a very different point: that respect for the Emperor and a desire to conform, not fear and punishment, kept certain senators in line.) Many covert references appear: Machiavelli generally follows Tacitus's decidedly negative slant on the history of Rome under the Emperors.

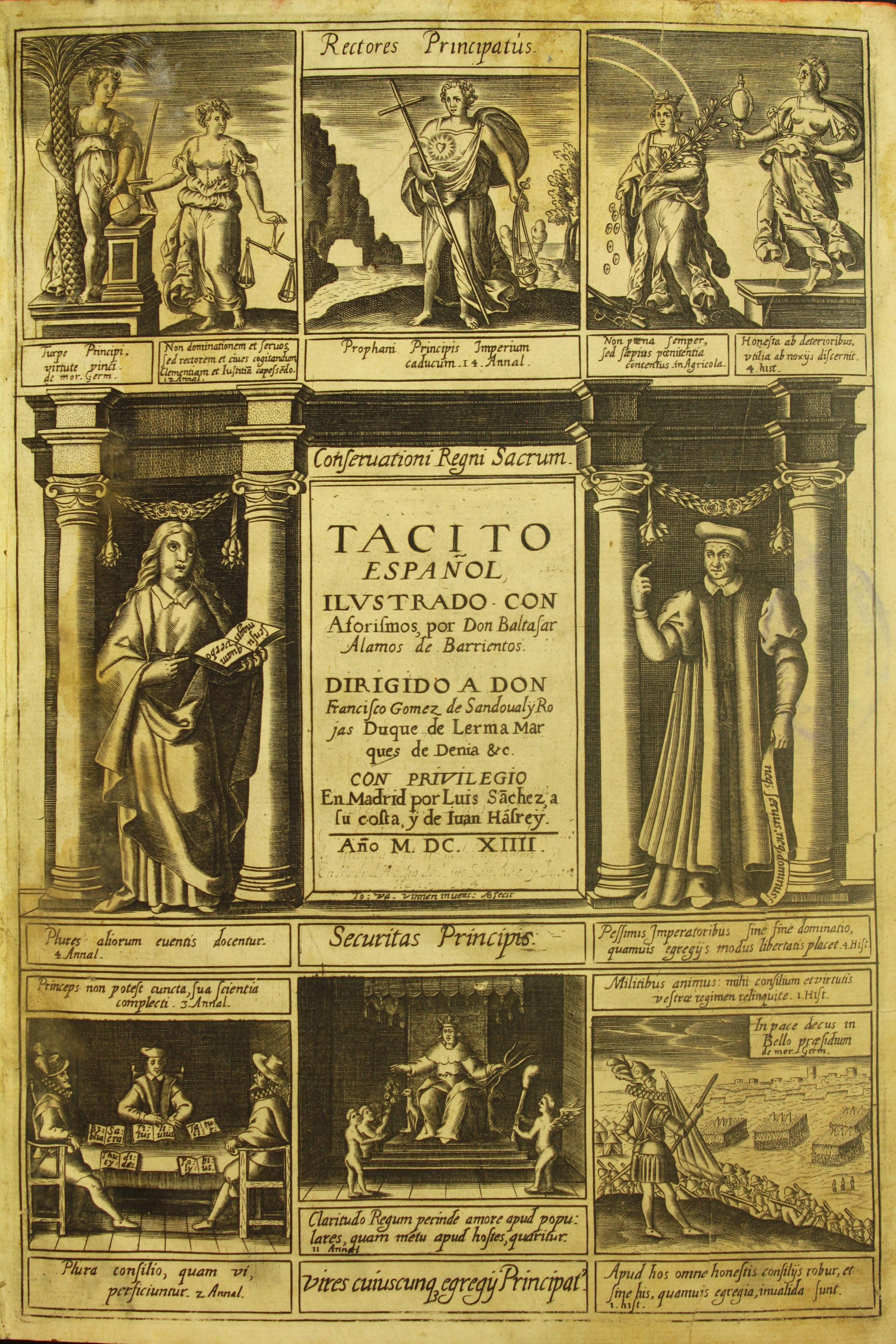
Tácito español ilustrado con aforismos por Baltasar Álamos de Barrientos, en Madrid, por Luis Sánchez, 1614

In the late 16th century Tacitus came to be regarded as the repository of the “secrets of the power” (“arcana imperii”, as Tacitus had called them in his Annals, 2.36.1). Tacitus's description of the artifices, stratagems, and utterly lawless reign of power politics at the Roman imperial court fascinated European scholars. By the first half of the seventeenth century editions of and commentaries upon Tacitus were flourishing. The Roman historian was compulsory reading in the political education of any learned man, notably senior magistrates. While authors like Casaubon and Pasquier deemed the precepts of Tacitus pernicious, writers like Justus Lipsius, Scipione Ammirato and Baltasar Alamos de Barrientos set out their reason of state in the form of commentaries on his work. Even the Jesuit political philosopher Giovanni Botero, who put together Tacitus with Machiavelli as the leading authorities for those who advocated an amoral reason of state, was thoroughly acquainted with the work of the Roman historian.

Gerolamo Cardano in his 1562 book Encomium Neronis describes Tacitus as a scoundrel of the worst kind, belonging to the rich senatorial class and always taking their side against the common people.

== Enlightenment and French Revolution ==
Early theoreticians of raison d'état used Tacitus to defend an ideal of Imperial rule. Other readers used him to construct a method for living under a despotic state, avoiding both servility and useless opposition. Diderot, for example, used Tacitus's works, in his apology for Seneca, to justify the collaboration of philosophers with the sovereign.

During the Enlightenment Tacitus was mostly admired for his opposition to despotism. In literature, some great tragedians such as Corneille, Jean Racine and Alfieri, took inspirations from Tacitus for their dramatic characters.

Edward Gibbon was strongly influenced by Tacitus's historical style in his History of the Decline and Fall of the Roman Empire,

The French Revolutionaries, for whom Tacitus had been a central part of their early education, made much use of his criticisms of tyranny and love of the republic—he is one of the authors most often quoted (behind Cicero, Horace, and Plutarch) by the members of the National and Legislative Assemblies and by revolutionary authors such as Jacques Pierre Brissot. Later, during the Reign of Terror, Camille Desmoulins and the writers of the Actes des Apôtres used him to denounce the excesses of the Jacobins.

Napoleon, on the other hand, attacked his works furiously, both for style and contents. This would-be founder of an Imperial dynasty, praised by amongst others Goethe for his insight in literature, knew the danger that Tacitus's histories might pose to one who wished to go around grabbing for power. François de Chateaubriand, for one, had already compared the new Emperor of the French to the worst emperors of Rome, warning that a new Tacitus would someday do for Napoleon what Tacitus had done for Nero. The Emperor's reaction was vicious: to Goethe and Wieland he complained that "Tacitus finds criminal intention in the simplest acts; he makes complete scoundrels out of all the emperors to make us admire his genius in exposing them". To others he swore that Tacitus, ce pamphlétaire, had "slandered the emperors" whom, he averred, the Roman people had loved.

== Twentieth century ==
By the 20th century authenticity of the remaining texts ascribed to Tacitus was generally acknowledged, apart from some difference of opinion about the Dialogus. Tacitus became a stock part of any education in classical literature – usually, however, only after the study of Caesar, Livy, Cicero, etc., while Tacitus's style requires a greater understanding of the Latin language, and is perceived as less "classical" than the authors of the Augustan age.

A remarkable feat was accomplished by Robert Graves: the major gap of text of the Annals that had gone lost regarded the end of Tiberius' reign, the whole of Caligula's reign, and the major part of Claudius' reign (the remaining part of Tacitus's manuscript only took up again at this Emperor's death, for the transition to the reign of Nero). Robert Graves's novels I, Claudius (1934) and Claudius the God (1935) filled the gap perfectly: all the missing parts of the Annals, up to the latter part of the reign of Claudius himself, were covered by a coherent story. Of course part of it can be considered "mockumentary" in the Augustan History tradition (for example how Claudius really felt about republicanism, heavily elaborated by Graves sometimes based on "reconstructed" historical documents, will probably never be really established). Graves borrowed much from Tacitus's style: apart from the "directness" of an Emperor pictured to write down his memoirs for private use (linked to the "lost testament of Claudius" mentioned in Tacitus's Annals), the treatment is also on a year-by-year basis, with digressions not unlike Tacitus's "moralising" digressions, so that in the introduction of the second of these two volumes Graves saw fit to defend himself as follows:

Some reviewers of I, Claudius, the prefatory volume to Claudius the God, suggested that in writing it I had merely consulted Tacitus's Annals and Suetonius's Twelve Caesars, run them together, and expanded the result with my own "vigorous fancy." This was not so; nor is it the case here. Among the Classical writers who have been borrowed from in the composition of Claudius the God are Tacitus, Cassius Dio, Suetonius, Pliny, Varro, Valerius Maximus, Orosius, Frontinus, Strabo, Caesar, Columella, Plutarch, Josephus, Diodorus Siculus, Photius, Xiphilinus, Zonaras, Seneca, Petronius, Juvenal, Philo, Celsus, the authors of the Acts of the Apostles and of the pseudo-gospels of Nicodemus and St. James, and Claudius himself in his surviving letters and speeches.

Graves's work reflected back on the perception of Tacitus's work: Graves curbed the "slandering of Emperors" by portraying Claudius as a good-humoured emperor, at heart a republican, resulting in the perception that if the "Claudius" part of Tacitus's annals had survived it probably wouldn't have been all slander towards the emperors of the 1st century. The more explicit defence of republicanism in Graves's work (that is: much more explicit than in Tacitus's work) also made any further direct defense of black Tacitism quite impossible (as far as Napoleon, by not advocating a black Tacitism line of thought hadn't already made such interpretation obsolete).

By the end of 20th century, however, a sort of inverted red tacitism (as the new variant of black tacitism could be called) appeared, for example in publications like Woodman's Tacitus reviewed: the new theories described the emperors of the principate no longer as monarchs ruling as autocrats, but as "magistrates" in essence defending a "republican" form of government (which might excuse some of their rash actions), very much in line with Graves's lenient posture regarding crimes committed under the rule of princeps Claudius (for instance the putting aside of the elder L. Silanus, showing the emperor's lack of conscience according to Tacitus, Ann. XII,3; while Graves's account of the same incident appears not to incriminate Claudius).

== Twenty-first century ==
One of Tacitus's polemics against the evils of empire, from his Agricola (ch. 30), was often quoted during the United States invasions of Afghanistan and Iraq, by those who found its warnings as applicable to the modern era as to the ancient (see for example The Guardian). It reads, in part:

Raptores orbis, postquam cuncta vastantibus defuere terrae, iam mare scrutantur: si locuples hostis est, avari, si pauper, ambitiosi, quos non Oriens, non Occidens satiaverit [...] Auferre trucidare rapere falsis nominibus imperium, atque ubi solitudinem faciunt, pacem appellant.	Brigands of the world, after the earth has failed their all-devastating hands, they probe even the sea; if their enemy be wealthy, they are greedy; if he be poor, they are ambitious; neither the East nor the West has glutted them [...] They plunder, they slaughter, and they steal: this they falsely name Empire, and where they make a wasteland, they call it peace.

(Punctuation follows the Loeb Classical Library edition)

== Notes ==
1. Mellor, 1995, p. xvii
2. Burke, 1969, pp. 162–163
3. Cassius Dio, 66.20; see Mendell, 1957, pp. 226, 228–229
4. Mellor, 1995, p. xix; Mendell, 1957, p. 228
5. Mendell, 1957, p. 226; Mellor, 1995, p. xix
6. Tertullian, Apologeticus 16
7. Mendell, 1957, pp. 228–229
8. Mendell, 1957, pp. 229–232; Mellor, 1995, p. xix
9. Jordanes, Getica 2.13; see Mendell, 1957, p. 232; Mellor, 1995, p. xix
10. Mendell, 1957, pp. 234–235, confuses Rudolf with Einhard, in whose work some of the uncertain references appear; Haverfield, 1916, p. 200; Schellhase, 1976, p. 5, gives the four references listed here.
11. Mendell, 1957, pp. 236–237; Schellhase, ibid.
12. Mendell, 1957, pp. 234–238, and Schellhase, 1976, ibid., survey some of these; see also Haverfield, 1916, passim.
13. Whitfield, 1976, passim
14. Schellhase, 1976, pp. 19–21, 26–27; Mellor, 1995, p. xx
15. Quoted in Schellhase, 1976, p. 20
16. Salutati, Epistolario, a letter dated 1 August 1395 and addressed to Bartolommeo Oliari, quoted in Schellhase, 1976, p. 20.
17. Mellor, 1995, pp. xx, 1–6 (selection from the Panegyric); Schellhase, 1976, pp. 17–18; Baron, 1966, pp. 58–60
18. Baron, ibid.; Schellhase, p. 18
19. Baron, 1966, pp. 66–70; Schellhase, 1976, pp. 22–23
20. Schellhase, 1976, pp. 24–30
21. Mellor, 1995, pp. xx–xxi, 6–7; Burke, 1969, pp. 164–166; Schellhase, 1976, pp. 67–68
22. Whitfield, 1976, p. 286
23. See Mellor, 1995, pp. xx–xxi, 6–7; Burke, 1969, pp. 164–166; Schellhase, 1976, pp. 70–82
24. Parker, 1937, pp. 16–20, 148–149; Mellor, 1995, pp. xlvii–xlviii
25. Mellor, pp. xlviii–xlix, 194–199. Tacitus couldn't be worried less (Ann. IV,35): "quo magis socordiam eorum inridere libet qui praesenti potentia credunt extingui posse etiam sequentis aevi memoriam. nam contra punitis ingeniis gliscit auctoritas, neque aliud externi reges aut qui eadem saevitia usi sunt nisi dedecus sibi atque illis gloriam peperere." – "And so one is all the more inclined to laugh at the stupidity of men who suppose that the despotism of the present can actually efface the remembrances of the next generation. On the contrary, the persecution of genius fosters its influence; foreign tyrants, and all who have imitated their oppression, have merely procured infamy for themselves and glory for their victims."
26. A website discussing the I, Claudius television series, which were based on Graves work, qualifies Tacitus as being of a "somewhat suspect" reliability because of Tacitus's so-called "malice" towards the emperors. The books by Graves, discussed at the same website are free of such reliability suspicions. So, in sum that website says: Tacitus is not very reliable because he slanders Emperors. Graves is reliable because his story-telling of the Imperial household is so convincing.

== Bibliography ==
- Bolgar, R. R. Classical Influences on European Culture A.D. 1500–1700. (Cambridge, Cambridge University Press, 1976) ISBN 0-521-20840-8
- Burke, P. "Tacitism" in Dorey, T.A., 1969, pp. 149–171
- Dorey, T. A. (ed.). Tacitus (London: Routledge and Kegan Paul, 1969) ISBN 0-7100-6432-2
- Haverfield, F. "Tacitus during the Late Roman Period and the Middle Ages". The Journal of Roman Studies, Vol. 6. (1916), pp. 196–201.
- Mellor, Ronald (ed.). Tacitus: The Classical Heritage (NY: Garland Publishing, 1995) ISBN 0-8153-0933-3
- Mendell, Clarence. Tacitus: The Man and His Work. (New Haven: Yale University Press, 1957) ISBN 0-208-00818-7
- Parker, Harold Talbot. The Cult of Antiquity and the French Revolutionaries: A Study in the Development of the Revolutionary Spirit. (Chicago, University of Chicago Press, 1937)
- Schellhase, Kenneth C. Tacitus in Renaissance Political Thought (Chicago, University of Chicago Press, 1976) ISBN 0-226-73700-4
- (In Italian:) Toffanin, Giuseppe. Machiavelli e il "Tacitismo". La "politica storica" al tempo della Controriforma. (Padua, Draghi, 1921; re-issued Naples, Guida, 1972) The book has no ISBN, but a query for its presence in libraries worldwide can be triggered by clicking this "Karlsruher Virtueller Katalog" link
- Whitfield, J. H. "Livy > Tacitus", in Bolgar, 1976; pp. 281–293
- Woodman, Anthony John. Tacitus Reviewed (Oxford: Oxford University Press, 1998) ISBN 0-19-815258-2
