= Lucy Chase and Sarah Chase =

19th-century schoolteachers from Massachusetts

Lucy Chase
- Born: December 1, 1822; Worcester, Massachusetts, U.S.
- Died: September 23, 1909 (aged 86); Worcester, Massachusetts, U.S.
- Occupation: Schoolteacher

Sarah Earle Chase
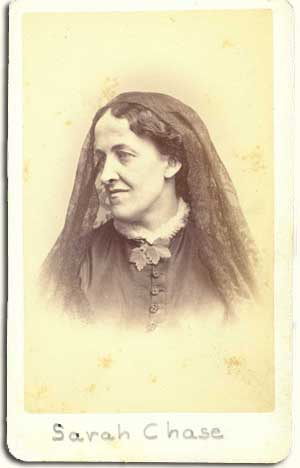
- Born: May 29, 1836; Worcester, Massachusetts, U.S.
- Died: January 9, 1915 (aged 78); Leicester, Massachusetts, U.S.
- Occupation: Schoolteacher

Lucy Chase (1822–1909) and Sarah Chase (1836–1911) were sisters from Massachusetts, United States, who volunteered as teachers in freedmen's schools during and after the American Civil War. Their letters to each other and their friends and family from this period are a valuable resource for historians on the Reconstruction era and on 19th-century African-American social and cultural history. The letter collection Dear Ones at Home was published by Vanderbilt University Press in 1965.

== Life and work ==
Lucy Chase was born and died in Worcester, Massachusetts. Sarah Chase was born in Worcester, died in Leicester, and is buried at Rural Cemetery in Worcester. Their mother Lydia Earle's father was Pliny Earle I, an inventor of cotton-processing mechanisms, their mother's mother Patience Buffum was sister to the Quaker abolitionist Arnold Buffum, and their father Anthony Benezet Chase was "a highly respected and successful businessman and treasurer of Worcester County." Two of their brothers, Pliny Earle Chase and Thomas Chase, were professors at Haverford. The sisters were motivated to volunteer in part due the teachings of their Quaker faith. They were initially paid $25 a month and given $20 for supplies.

At the time of her death in 1909, Lucy Chase's obituary summarized her legacy: "During the civil war she became a teacher in the schools established by Gen. Butler at Craney Island, near Norfolk, Va. for the education of the freed slaves, and many of the older colored residents of Worcester owe their education to her. She was an accomplished artist in painting and sculpture, and she wrote in a fascinating way of her experiences in the slave schools and her extended travels around the world." Some of their letters were first published by the New England Educational Commission in 1864, a year after they arrived in Virginia. According to academic Richard L. Zuber, "They wrote home frequently, long newsy letters, full of the type of description that warms the historian's heart—pictures of the living conditions, and the attitudes and aspirations of the freedmen." Lucy volunteered from 1863 to 1869 in Virginia, Georgia, South Carolina, and Florida; Sarah, who was troubled by health problems, was with her for part of that time—"Their letters from such places as Richmond, New Bern, Charleston, Savannah, and Columbus are graphic in their descriptions both of places and of people." A great deal of their initial work was devoted to the acquiring the rudiments of food, shelter, clothing, and healthcare for destitute refugees. Only once basic needs were met could the sisters begin to act on their "optimistic assurance that the primer and schoolbook were the keys to the black man's future; to this they had dedicated themselves."

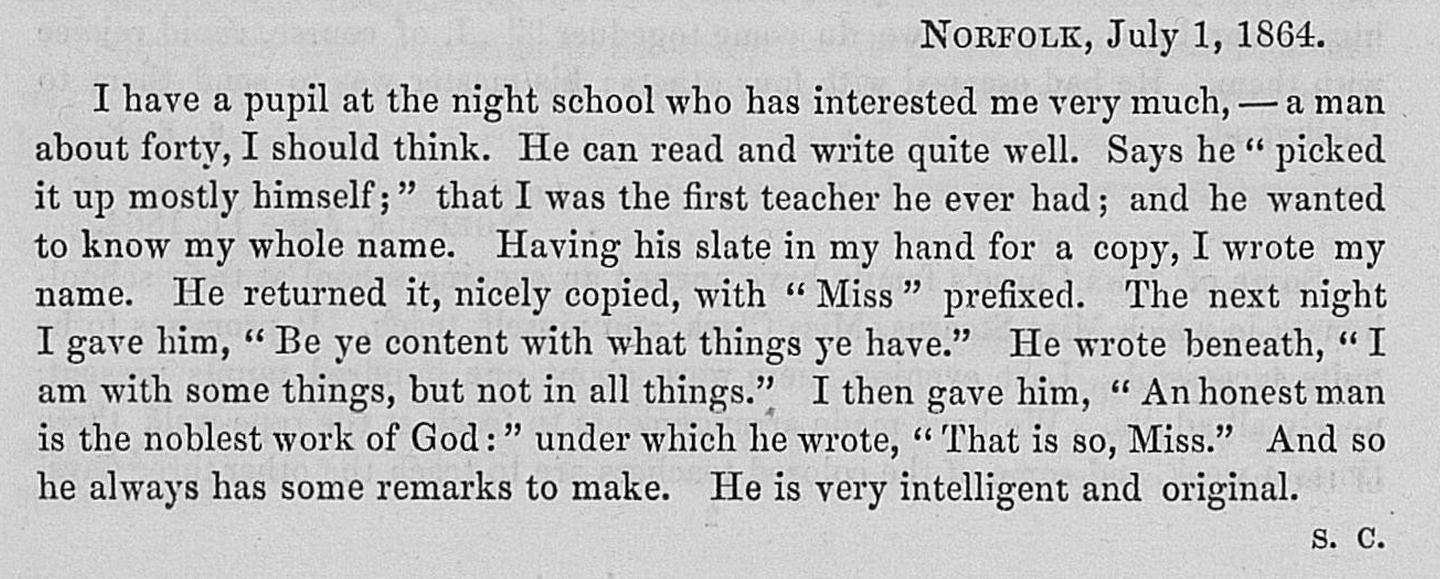
"Letters of Teachers and Superintendents of the New-England Educational Commission for Freedmen" (1864)

There were no lineal descendants of the Chase sisters to inherit their papers, so family members donated them to the American Antiquarian Society for preservation. In addition to manuscripts from the sisters and their correspondents, there are pieces written by their students, as well as business records belonging to the Richmond slave trader R. H. Dickinson, which were looted by the sisters and taken home to New England. Many of the letters were published in a collection called Dear Ones at Home: Letters from the Contraband Camps, edited by historian Henry Lee Swint and published by Vanderbilt University Press in 1966. In addition to their information about American slavery, public education, living conditions in the south, 19th-century American perspectives on gender and race, and the war proper, the letters have been used by researchers studying the black church and African-American dance history. The letters and journals of the Chases sisters also provide descriptions of folk medicine, "Negro dialect and colloquialisms...snatches of songs and hymns...and a sprinkling of comments on Negro recreational and religious life." Historian Martin Schlegel credits the sisters for being remarkably free of race prejudice for the time and place: "Their sympathy for the Negro does not lead them to minimize his faults or exaggerate his virtues. The Negro they depict is not a saint, but a very human being, eager and able to learn and ready to defend his freedom." According to historian Larry Gara:

Despite the markedly paternalistic attitude that colored much that the Chase sisters wrote, their letters add considerable detail to our knowledge of life in the contraband communities. Lucy told the story of one former slave who had been parted from her husband as a young woman and who remarked: "White folk's got a heap to answer for the way they've done to colored folks! So much they won't never pray it away!" The years of service volunteered by Lucy and Sarah Chase and thousands like them made slight atonement for that "heap"...

Other notable Northern female-schoolteacher letter writers from the Reconstruction-era south include Laura M. Towne and Charlotte L. Forten.

Sarah Chase was mischaracterized as a teenage girl writing in her diary in a 2010 forensic-accounting study of the slave-trading records she and her sister pillaged from Virginia: "In a curious turn of events, in April 1865 the record book used for this study became the diary of a teenage girl named Sarah Chase. According to a note made by the girl, the book was 'taken from D&H Slave Auction House on Franklin Street when we looked over his desk and papers.' The girl goes on to write: 'March 31st. slaves were sold...[illegible]...and the of sale in the daybook a heavy line was drawn beneath it and...April 1—but—thank God—no more transmitting will ever be done in that bloody Register'."

== See also ==
- Charles Carleton Coffin – American journalist (1823–1896), who looted the Ziba Oakes letters
- Anthony Benezet – French-born American abolitionist and teacher
