= Pliny Earle =

Pliny Earle may refer to:

- Pliny Earle I (1762–1832), American inventor
- Pliny Earle (physician) or Pliny Earle II (1809–1892), American physician

== See also ==
- Pliny Earle Goddard (1869–1928), linguist and ethnologist
