= John Milton Earle =

American politician (1794–1874)

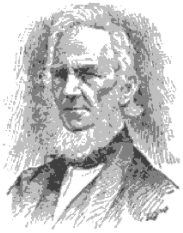

Member of the Massachusetts Senate
- In office 1858

Member of the Massachusetts House of Representatives
- In office 1844–1846
- In office 1850–1852

Personal details
- Born: April 13, 1794 Leicester, Massachusetts
- Died: February 8, 1874 (aged 79) Worcester, Massachusetts
- Resting place: Worcester Rural Cemetery
- Party: Whig; Free Soil
- Spouse: Sarah Hussey (m. 1821)
- Parents: Pliny Earle (father); Patience Earle (mother)
- Occupation: Businessman, politician

John Milton Earle (April 13, 1794 – February 8, 1874) was an American businessman, abolitionist, commissioner of the Earle Report, and politician who founded the Massachusetts Horticultural Society in 1829.

== Biography ==
John Milton Earle was born in Leicester, Massachusetts to Patience Earle (née Buffum) and Pliny Earle, a member of the prominent Earle family. He was educated in common schools and at the Leicester Academy. He was the editor and publisher of the Massachusetts Spy from 1823 to 1857. The publication was called the Daily Spy after July 22, 1845. The offices were in the Butman Block on Main Street.

Although not a technical Garrisonian abolitionist, he was an early pioneer in Anti-Slavery movement first as a Whig, then as a Free Soiler. He tried to make Worcester County the stronghold of conscientious and determined political opposition to slavery. He was a member of the Massachusetts General Court, or state legislature, for several years, serving in both the House of Representatives (1844–1846 and 1850–1852) and the Senate (1858). He was also a city alderman, postmaster, state commissioner on Indian affairs, and founder of the Massachusetts Horticultural Society. He served as president of the Worcester County Horticultural Society from 1848 to 1851.

He married Sarah Hussey (August 26, 1799 – March 9, 1858), who organized the Worcester Anti-Slavery Sewing Circle and Worcester County Anti-Slavery Society, South Division. She was the daughter of Tristram Hussey and Sarah Folger of Nantucket, Massachusetts. Lucretia Mott was her cousin. Sarah married John Milton Earle on June 6, 1821 in Nantucket before moving to Worcester, Massachusetts. The family lived on Nobility Hill at 262 Main Street across from the Worcester Common. She served on the Executive Committee of Worcester County Anti-Slavery Society, South Division, 1841–1859. She helped coordinate Anti Slavery fairs from 1848 and opened the 1850 National Woman's Rights Convention. Her obituary notice in the Worcester Spy said, "Aside from her own family circle, no one has cause to mourn more deeply than the slave, for whose interests her labors were untiring."

Earle died in Worcester on February 8, 1874, and was buried in its Rural Cemetery.
