= Ralph Earle (American naval officer) =

United States Navy admiral (1874–1939)

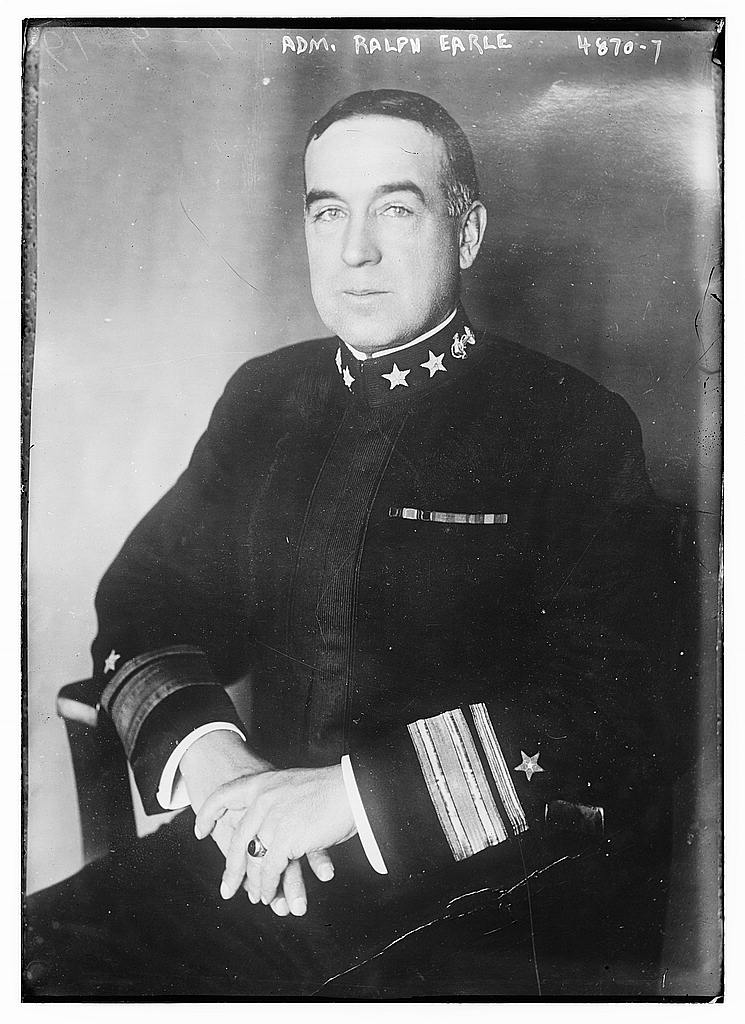
- Earle in 1919
- Born: May 3, 1874; Worcester, Massachusetts, U.S.
- Died: February 13, 1939 (aged 64); Worcester, Massachusetts, U.S.
- Burial place: Quaker Cemetery
- Relatives: Stephen C. Earle (Father)
- Military career
- Allegiance: United States of America
- Branch: United States Navy
- Service years: 1896–1927
- Rank: Rear Admiral
- Unit: Chief of the Bureau of Ordnance
- Conflicts: Spanish–American War; World War I
- Awards: Commendations from the President

Ralph Earle (May 3, 1874 – February 13, 1939) was an American Navy officer and university president. He served the United States Navy during the Spanish–American War and World War I. He was the Chief, Bureau of Ordnance (BUORD) and retired as a rear admiral in 1927. He was also president of Worcester Polytechnic Institute from 1925 to 1939.

== Biography ==
Earle was born on May 3, 1874, in Worcester, Massachusetts. He graduated from the United States Naval Academy in 1896.

He served at sea in several ships, among them USS Massachusetts, Essex, and Hornet.

While on board USS Missouri, he won commendations from the President and Secretary of the Navy for his conduct at the time of a disastrous turret explosion.

He commanded USS Dolphin during the Tampico Affair, and at the U.S. occupation of Veracruz, Mexico, and later commanded Connecticut.

Ashore, Earle had duty at the U.S. Naval Academy and the Naval Proving Ground. An expert on guns and explosives, he was made Chief of the Bureau of Ordnance shortly before the United States entered World War I.

Under his administration the North Sea mine barrage was conceived and executed using a new type of mine, and the plan of mounting naval 14-inch guns on railway cars for use as long-range artillery on the Western Front, was evolved and carried out.

After his retirement in 1925, Rear Admiral Earle served as president of Worcester Polytechnic Institute until his death. Earle implemented a five-year plan which brought the students a swimming pool and a new hall named after R. Sanford Riley among other needed campus improvements. He was elected to the American Antiquarian Society in 1927 and served as president of the Worcester Economic Club in 1931.

He died of a stroke on February 13, 1939, in Worcester, Massachusetts, and is buried in the Quaker Cemetery, Leicester, Massachusetts.

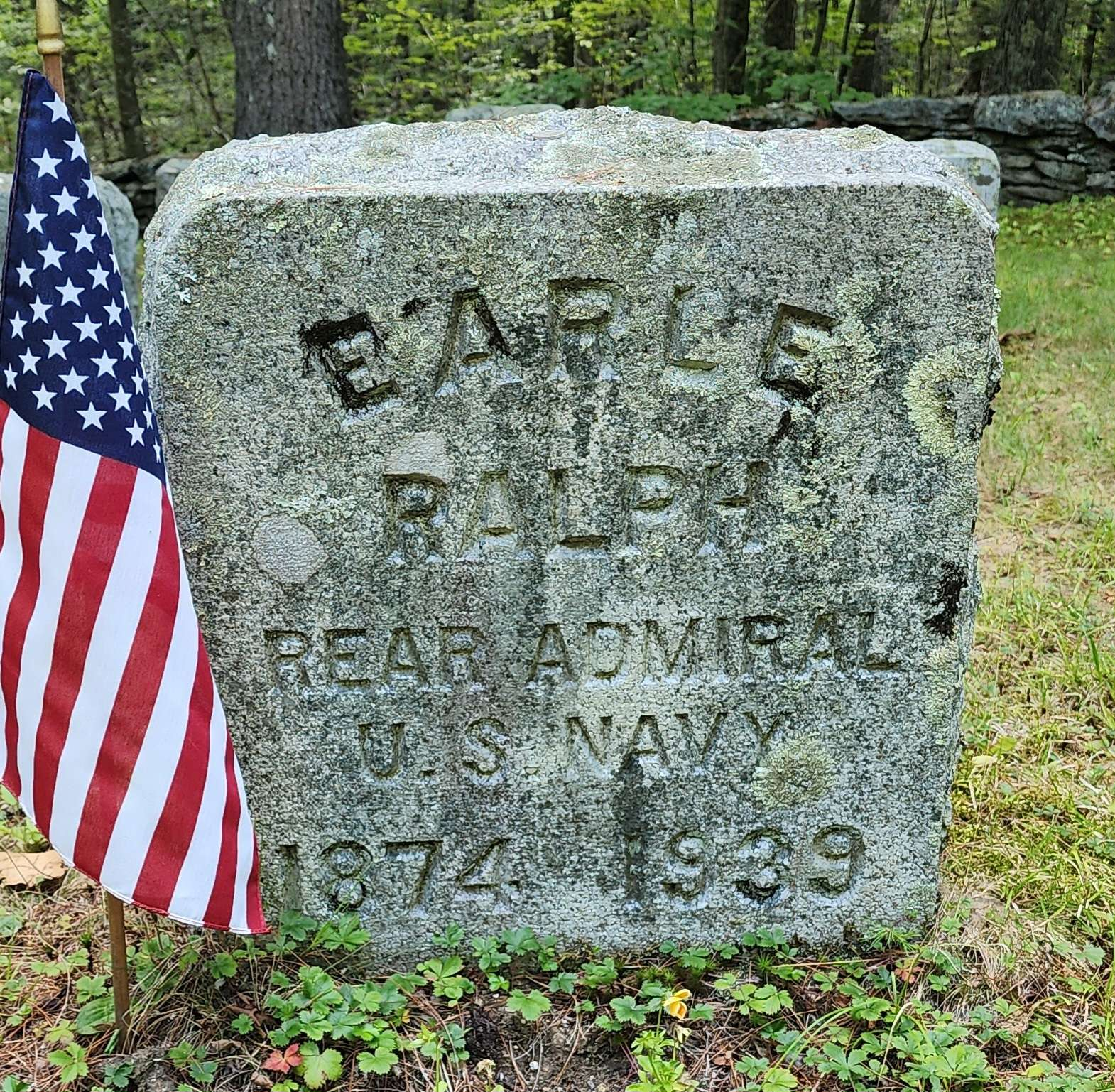
The grave of Ralph Earle at the Quaker Cemetery in Leicester, MA

== Honored in ship naming ==
The USS Earle, launched December 10, 1941, by Boston Navy Yard, was named in his honor. The launch was sponsored by Mrs. John F. Hines, Jr., daughter of Rear Admiral Earle.

The Naval Weapons Station Earle (New Jersey) was also named (in 1943) to honor the admiral because of his strong association with ordnance projects.

== See also ==
- United States Navy
- World War I
