= Pliny =

Pliny may refer to:

== People and fictional characters ==
- Pliny the Elder (23–79 CE), ancient Roman nobleman, scientist, and historian
- Pliny the Younger (died 113), ancient Roman statesman, orator, writer, and Pliny the Elder's nephew and adopted son
- Pliny Chase (1820–1886), American scientist, mathematician, and educator
- Pliny Earle (disambiguation), several people
- Pliny Fisk III (born 1944), co-founder and co-director of the Center for Maximum Potential Building Systems (CMPBS)
- Pliny Earle Goddard (1869–1928), American linguist and ethnologist
- Pliny Norcross (1838–1915), American politician
- Pliny W. Williamson (1876–1958), American politician
- Pliny, a fictional character in the animated series StuGo

== Places ==
- Pliny, West Virginia, United States
- Pliny Township, Minnesota, United States

== Beers ==
- Pliny the Elder, the flagship beer of the Russian River Brewing Company
- Pliny the Younger (beer), a seasonal (February) beer of the Russian River Brewing Company

== See also ==
- Plinia, a genus of the botanical family Myrtaceae
- Plinian eruption, a type of volcanic eruption similar to AD 79 eruption of Mount Vesuvius
- Plinio (disambiguation)
- Plinius (crater), a lunar impact crater
- PLINIVS, a 2013 manga biography of Pliny the Elder
