= Albert Southwick (historian) =

American historian (1920–2021)

Albert Brown Southwick
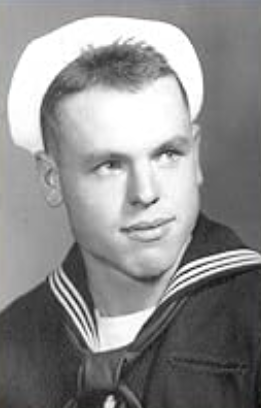
- Southwick in the U.S. Navy during World War II
- Born: June 22, 1920; Leicester, Massachusetts, United States
- Died: April 16, 2021 (aged 100); Worcester, Massachusetts, United States
- Resting place: Quaker Cemetery
- Education: Clark University (BA, MA); Brown University (graduate study)
- Occupations: Historian, editorial writer, naval aviator
- Employer: Worcester Telegram & Gazette
- Notable work: Once-Told Tales of Worcester County
- Website: albertsouthwick.com

Albert Brown Southwick (June 22, 1920 – April 16, 2021) was an American historian, editorial writer, and newspaper columnist best known for his writings on Worcester County, Massachusetts, and local history. He served as the chief editorial writer for the Worcester Telegram & Gazette and continued contributing columns on local history until late in life.

== Biography ==
Southwick was born in Leicester, Massachusetts, the seventh of nine children. He was raised on his family's farm and began his education at the Mannville School, a one-room schoolhouse where a single teacher taught all eight grades. He later graduated from Leicester High School and attended Clark University, where he earned a bachelor's and a master's degree. He was a member of the American Antiquarian Society.

During World War II, Southwick served in the United States Navy. He enlisted in the armed forces after the attack on Pearl Harbor. His wartime service took him to numerous locations, from training stations in Rhode Island and Florida to postings in Virginia, California, Louisiana, Texas, and back to Florida. He trained as a radioman and aviator, learning Morse code, radar, semaphore, radio operations, and piloting — including night flights and time in PBY aircraft. Over the course of several years, by the end of 1944, he rose to the rank of Aviation Pilot, First Class, having served at 11 different bases.

After the war, he returned to Clark University to complete his M.A., then pursued additional graduate work in American history at Brown University.

Southwick died in 2021 and was buried at the Quaker Cemetery in Leicester, Massachusetts.

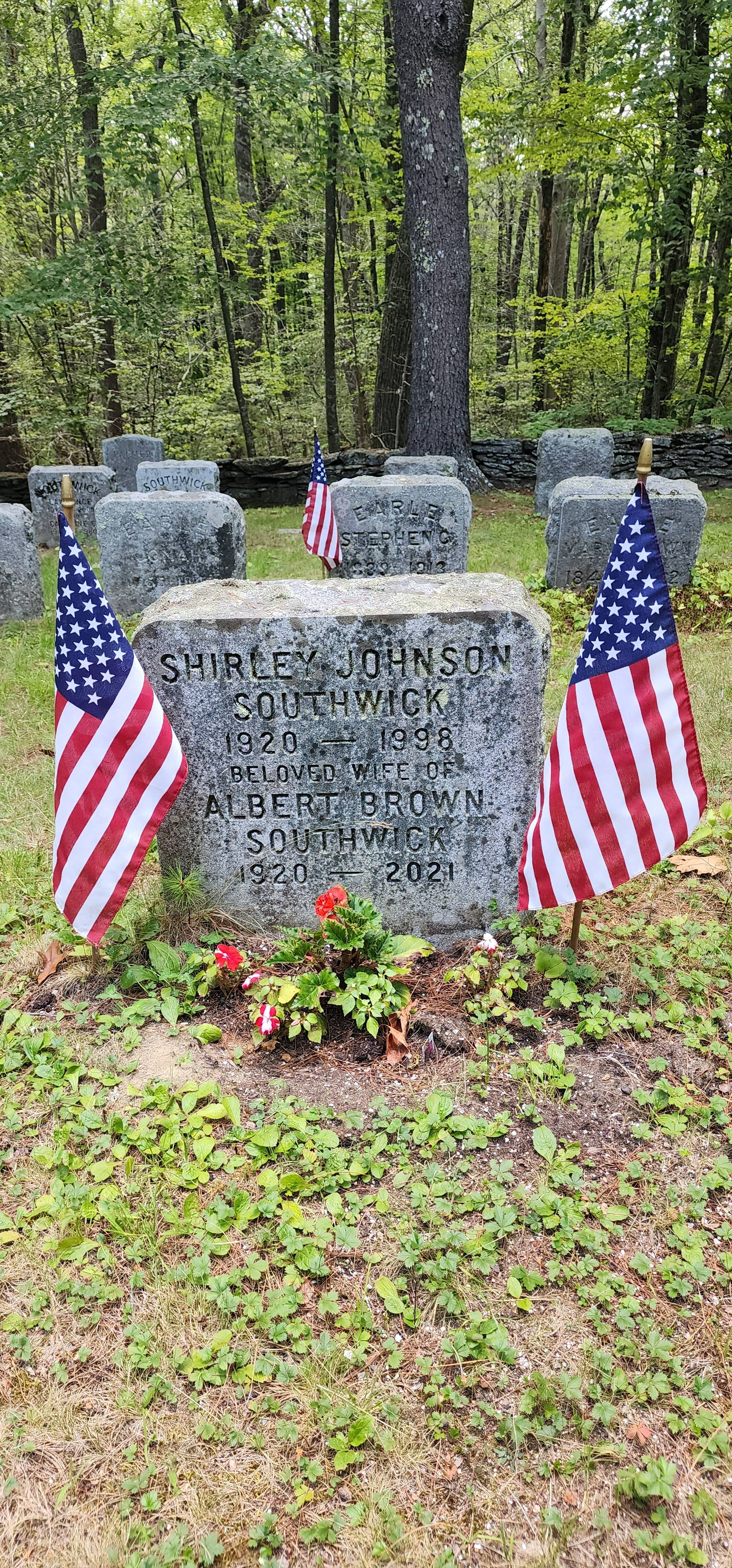
The grave of Albert Brown Southwick and his wife Shirley at the Quaker Cemetery in Leicester, Massachusetts

== Career ==
From 1950 to 1952, Southwick worked as a civilian historian for the United States Seventh Army, stationed in Stuttgart, Germany. Upon returning to the U.S., he briefly worked for the Providence Journal before joining the Worcester Telegram and Evening Gazette in 1952 as an editorial writer. He became the paper's chief editorial writer in 1968 and held the position until his retirement in 1986.

Southwick continued to write after retirement, producing local history columns, several books, and two librettos.

== Publications ==
Southwick authored numerous books on history and regional identity. He wrote numerous books and two librettos. His works include:

- The Worcester Club at 100 Years
- The Johnson Family of Hyde Park & Sag Harbor
- Once-Told Tales of Worcester County
- More Once-Told Tales of Worcester County
- 150 Years of Worcester: 1848 – 1998
- Down on the Farm, Volume I
- WWII Correspondence between Albert B. Southwick and Maple Hill Farm: February to June 1942
- Midas (libretto)
- The Peaceable Kingdom (libretto), which was translated into German and performed in Vienna, Austria – in English at the Anglican Church and in German at the Vienna Konzerthaus

== See also ==
- History of Worcester, Massachusetts
- Clark University
- Worcester Telegram & Gazette
- Quaker Cemetery
