= Ashworth and Jones Factory =

- U.S. National Register of Historic Places
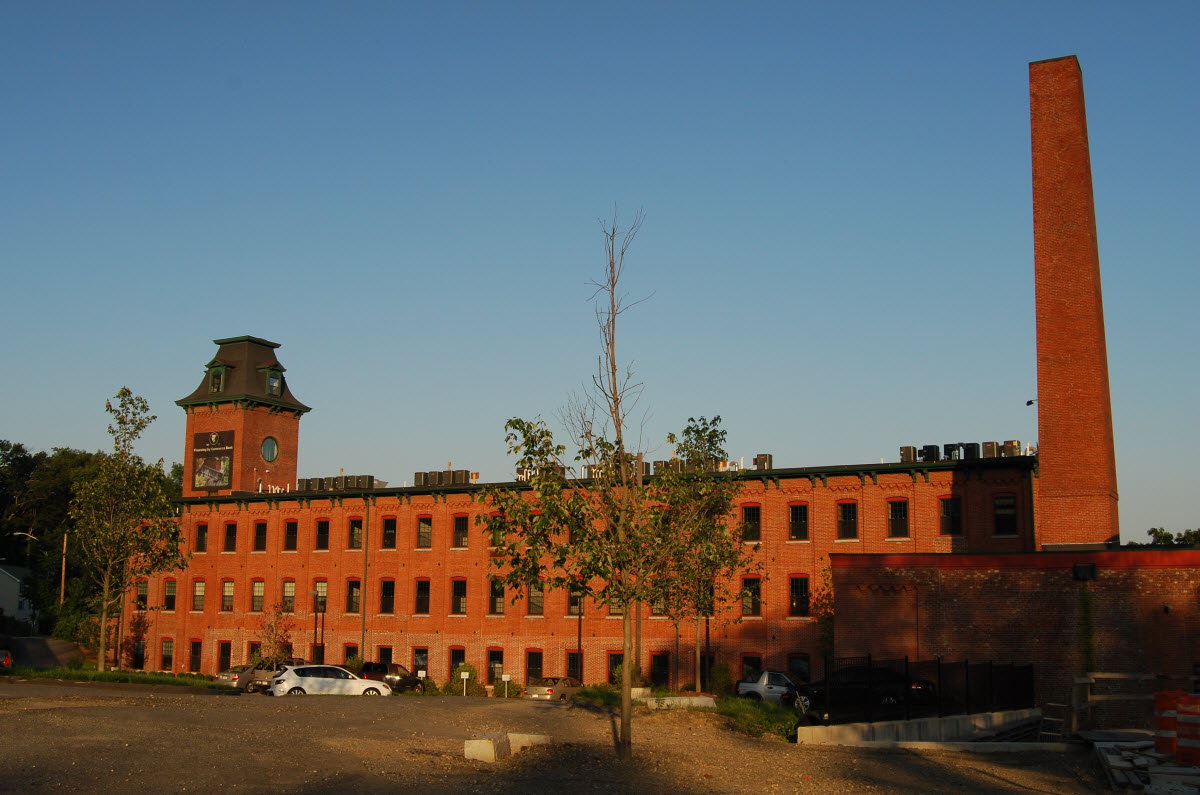

- Location within Massachusetts Location within the United States
- Location: 1511 Main St., Worcester, Massachusetts
- Coordinates: 42°14′23″N 71°51′41″W
- Area: 7.7 acres (3.1 ha)
- Built: 1870
- Architectural style: Mid 19th Century Industrial
- MPS: Worcester MRA
- NRHP reference No.: 80000489
- Added to NRHP: March 05, 1980

The Ashworth and Jones Factory is a historic building at 1511 Main Street in Worcester, Massachusetts. It is one of the architecturally finest mid 19th century factory buildings in the city. Built in 1870 and repeatedly enlarged, most of its sections retain high quality brickwork and mid-19th century Victorian styling. The factory was listed on the National Register of Historic Places in 1980. The complex has been converted into condominium residences known as Kettle Brook Lofts.

== Description and history ==
The former Ashworth and Jones Factory complex is located in far southwestern Worcester, near the town line with Leicester, on the south side of Main Street (Massachusetts Route 9). The complex consists of a series of buildings that roughly form a U shape. The oldest portion is a four-story brick building, in which windows are set in recessed corbelled wall panels, with pilaster-like piers separating the windows. The lowest floor has windows only facing the ravine below where Kettle Brook flows. There is a clock tower on one corner that is topped by a flared mansard roof. The attached additions to the main block are one and two stories in height, and continue the styling and materials used in the original block, despite a forty-year construction range.

The factory site used for industrial purposes beginning early in the 19th century, and was built by Thomas Ashworth and Edward Jones in 1861, where they manufactured beaver top hats. The mill is now the Kettle Brook Lofts 1511 Main St, Worcester, MA The present building's main block was built in 1870. After the death of Thomas Ashworth and Edmund Jones in 1880s the business was taken over by E. D. Thayer, who built many of the additions, and manufactured woolens until his death in 1907. George Duffy acquired the facility in 1910, and again enlarged the premises. The building was purchased again in early 1900's by two Ashworth brothers and they made Shoddy fabric from recycled materials. These two brothers had a mill in Leicester whose structure did not survive. These brothers then purchased the Jones Ashworth mill. Two other Ashworth brothers owned a mill in Charlton, Massachusetts,

== See also ==
- National Register of Historic Places listings in southwestern Worcester, Massachusetts
- National Register of Historic Places listings in Worcester County, Massachusetts
