= Plinio =

Plinio is a masculine given name, the Romance language version of Pliny. It may refer to:

- Plínio de Arruda Sampaio Jr., Brazilian economist, academic, and politician
- Plínio Osvaldo Fonseca Brito (born 1972), aka Pinha, Cape Verdean former footballer
- Plinio Clabassi (1919–1984), Italian operatic bass
- Plinio Corrêa de Oliveira (1908–1995), Brazilian Catholic intellectual, writer, professor, and political activist
- Plinio Farina (1902–1972), Italian footballer
- Plínio Marcos (1935—1999), Brazilian writer, actor, journalist, and playwright
- Plinio Apuleyo Mendoza (born 1931), Colombian journalist, writer, and diplomat
- Plinio Nomellini (1866–1943), Italian painter
- Plinio Penzzi (fl. 2003), Paraguayan former long-distance runner
- Plinio Plini, late 19th century Italian painter
- Plinio Prieto (1923–1960), Cuban revolutionary and captain in the Cuban Revolution
- Plínio Salgado (1895–1975), Brazilian politician, writer, journalist, and theologian
- Plinio Lauer Simões (1915–1994), Brazilian Anglican bishop
- Plínio Valério (born 1955), Brazilian journalist and politician
- Plínio (footballer, born 1946), Brazilian football midfielder José Plínio de Godoy
- Plínio (footballer, born 1984), Brazilian football defender Plínio Marcos da Silva
