= Pliny Earle I =

American inventor (1762–1832)

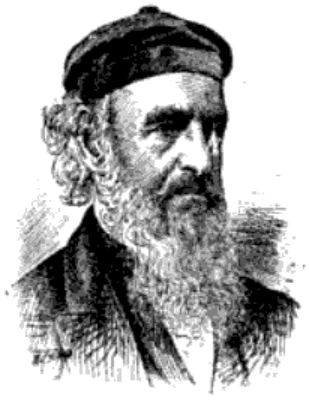
- Born: December 17, 1762; Leicester, Massachusetts
- Died: November 19, 1832 (aged 69); Leicester, Massachusetts
- Resting place: Quaker Cemetery, Leicester, Massachusetts
- Occupation: Inventor
- Children: Pliny Earle II; John Milton Earle; Thomas Earle; Lydia Earle Chase (1798–1852); Sarah Hadwen; William Buffum Earle; Lucy Earle; Jonah Earle II
- Parents: Robert Earle; Sarah Earle

Pliny Earle I (December 17, 1762 – November 19, 1832) was an American inventor who made wool and cotton carding pickers.

== Biography ==
Pliny Earle I was born in 1762 in Leicester, Massachusetts, the son of Sarah and Robert Earle.

In 1785, he teamed with Edmund Snow in the manufacture of carding machines for cotton and wool. Among the many obstacles encountered by Samuel Slater in the introduction into the United States of the manufacture of cotton by machinery was the difficulty of procuring card clothing for his machines.

After unsuccessful applications to several other persons, he went, in 1790, to Earle, who, although it was a new and untried work, agreed to make the cards. He succeeded, but to achieve that success he was obliged to prick the holes for the teeth with two needles fastened in the handle. This led him to the invention of the machine for pricking "twilled" cards, by which the labor of a man for fifteen hours could be performed in as many minutes. This machine was in general use for years, until the machine that both pricks the leather and sets the teeth superseded it. He was a member of the Society of Friends, and, apart from his inventive genius, made extensive attainments in science and literature.

Earle subsequently took little part in political affairs. He devoted his time principally to literary work, and published an Essay on Penal Law; an Essay on the Rights of States to Alter and to Annul their Charters; Treatise on Railroads and Internal Communications (1830), and a Life of Benjamin Lundy. At the time of his death he was engaged in a translation of Sismondi's Italian Republics, and in the compilation of a Grammatical Dictionary of the French and the English Languages.

He died in Leicester, Massachusetts in November 1832 and is buried at Quaker Cemetery.

== Children ==
- John Milton Earle
- Pliny Earle II
- Thomas Earle
- Lydia Earle Chase
- Sarah Hadwen
- William Buffum Earle
- Lucy Earle
- Jonah Earle II

== Grandchildren ==
- Pliny Earle Chase
- Thomas Chase
- Lucy and Sarah Chase
