= Ruth Henshaw Bascom =

American folk artist

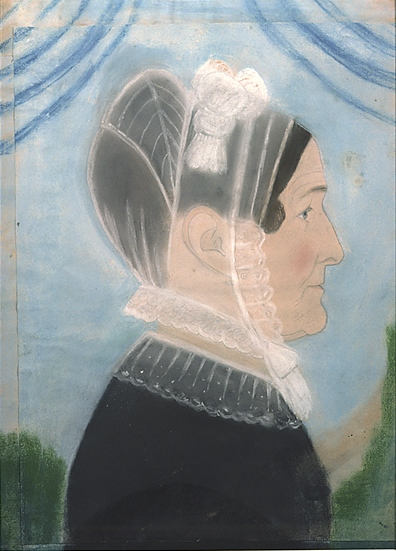
- Self-portrait, drawing, 1829, Five Colleges and Historic Deerfield Museum Consortium
- Born: Ruth Henshaw; December 15, 1772; Leicester, Massachusetts
- Died: February 16, 1848 (aged 75); Ashby, Massachusetts
- Resting place: Ashby First Parish Burial Ground
- Known for: Folk art portraits
- Spouses: Dr. Asa Miles (1804–1805, death); Rev. Ezekiel Lysander Bascom (1806–1841, death)

Ruth Henshaw Bascom, also known as Aunt Ruth (December 15, 1772 – February 16, 1848), was an American folk artist who produced over 1,400 portraits. She was the daughter of Colonel William Henshaw and Phebe Swan of Leicester, Massachusetts, and a schoolteacher from 1791 to 1801. Bascom married first, at about 32 years of age, to Dr. Asa Miles, but he died a year or more after their marriage. She married a second time for about 35 years to Reverend Ezekial Lysander Bascom. Bascom didn't give birth to children of her own, but she had a stepson from her first marriage, stepdaughter from her second marriage, and a niece and nephew that she raised. She documented the daily activities of her life in diaries beginning at the age of 17, which included records of the portraits that she made.

While married Bascom fulfilled the role of a minister's wife, was a teacher, and was active at the local library and in temperance societies. She made her first portrait in 1801, but she did not begin creating portraits regularly until after 1818. Bascom worked with a variety of materials, including pastels, pencils, cut paper, and foil. Some of her initial works were layered pieces of paper that represented the head and neck, clothing, and accessories placed over a background. She also made pastel portraits on one sheet of paper in the latter part of her career.

Charlotte Streifer Rubinstein, author of American Women Artists: From Early Indian Times to the Present (1982), said that Bascom had a "calm strength of characterization combined with a sensitive feeling for shape, color and texture."

== Early life ==
Ruth Henshaw was born on December 15, 1772, in rural Leicester, Massachusetts, to Colonel William Henshaw (1735–1820) and Phebe Swan Henshaw (1753–1808); she was the first of their ten children. Bascom had two older half-sisters from Henshaw's previous marriage to Ruth Sargeant, who was her namesake. Her father was a veteran of the French and Indian War and during the American Revolution, he was a key leader of the Worcester County Minutemen. He was also active with the Massachusetts General Court and served with George Washington during several battles in New Jersey.

Bascom grew up in Leicester in an area known as Green Valley. Bascom's childhood schooling is unknown; author Lois S. Avigad theorizes that she attended local "summer term" schools for girls, which generally took place between April and October. She attended Leicester Academy, which opened in 1784, for a brief session in 1791.

She documented her life in a diary, held at the American Antiquarian Society in Worcester, Massachusetts, from 1789 to 1846. Bascom created a diary for each year, starting with January 1. She recorded her daily activities, the weather, and visitors. She also included detailed travel information and the topics of her husband's sermons.

== Educator ==
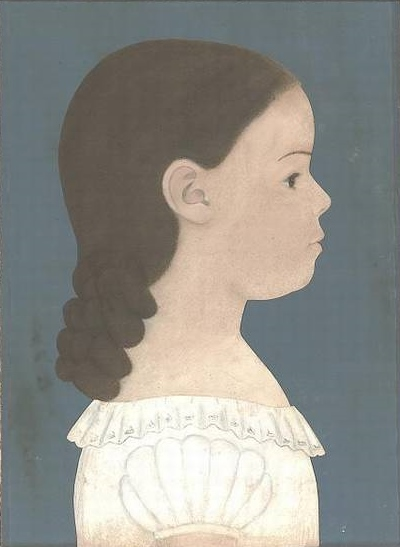
Elizabeth Cummings Low, watercolor, pastel, and pencil, 1829.

From 1791 to 1801, she was a summer school teacher in the Leicester area. She taught up to 10 children who lived in the Bascom household during her marriage to Reverend Bascom; the schooling, paid for by the community, was conducted over a short term that included basic education, singing, and a term finale with costumes. Clough R. Miles, her stepson, lived in the Bascom household and studied there in 1809 and other years. In 1814 she was made superintendent of the Phillipston's central school.

When there was a demand for weaving cards in the state's textile mills, Bascom trained children in her home, school, and neighborhood how to make the cards. The cottage industry helped subsidize the income of the children's families.

== Marriage and family ==
In 1804, when she was about 32 years old, Bascom married Dr Asa Miles, a widower. He was a physician from Westminster, Massachusetts, with a son, Clough Rice Miles (1796–1879). Dr. Miles was ill for an extended period and died in 1805 or 1806. Bascom moved back to her parents’ house and opened a millinery business in Leicester following her husband's death.

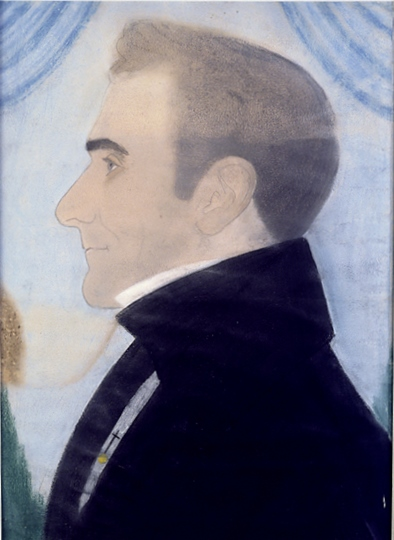
Ruth Henshaw Bascom, Reverend Ezekiel Bascom, drawing, 1829, Five Colleges and Historic Deerfield Museum Consortium.

She married Ezekiel Lysander Bascom on February 26, 1806. He was a Congregational minister in Phillipston, who was married twice before. His second wife died in July, 1805. Bascom did not give birth to any children during the marriage, but she was an attentive and caring stepmother to Ezekiel's daughter, Priscilla Elvira Bascom Philbrick (b. 1803), from a previous marriage. After Ezekiel's sister, Eunice Loveland, committed suicide in 1810, the Bascoms raised her youngest child, a five- or seven-year-old boy named Lysander Bascom Loveland. As a minister's wife, Bascom was busy socializing, recording church events, and visiting the sick. In addition to her household duties, she was active in temperance societies and at the library. In 1816 Bascom began recording the town's vital statistics.

Clough R. Miles, her stepson, who had lived and studied in the Bascom household, resided with them again when he taught school. Miles's earnings helped pay for his Harvard education and he graduated in 1817. The family also took in children temporarily when a parent lost their spouse or when a new child was born into a family. They also brought two family members into their home: Reverend Bascom's niece, Clymene Sophronia Allen and Ruth Bascom's infant niece, Phebe Henshaw Denny.

Reverend Bascom was dismissed for his liberal theology in 1820 from the Congregational Church in Phillipston after 21 years ministering to the church, The Bascoms moved to Ashby in 1820 and Ezekiel served as a minister there for 14 years, beginning on January 3, 1821. That year, Lysander took a job in Concord. Priscilla became a teacher and moved to Savannah, Georgia, in 1825 where she worked, married and settled. This left Phebe as the remaining child in the home. In 1827, Reverend Bascom represented Ashby at the Massachusetts General Court for a three-year period, which took him away from the house when he was in Boston. In the 1830s, they lived in Gill, Massachusetts. In the early 1830s Reverend Bascom's health began to decline and he spent 9 months of the year in Savannah. He stayed with his daughter and worked as a part-team preacher. Ruth Bascom visited family— often her siblings and their children—and friends in New England during the winter months of her husband's visits to Georgia. When the Bascoms traveled they often went by stagecoach.

In 1837, Ezekiel was a Unitarian minister in Kennebunk, Maine, as part of a ministerial exchange. They then moved to Fitzwilliam, New Hampshire, where her husband (Note: The couple also lived at some point in Deerfield, Massachusetts.) served as a partially retired minister. Reverend Bascom died on April 2, 1841. She traveled throughout Massachusetts and Maine and lived in a boarding house in Ashby following her husband's death.

== Artist ==
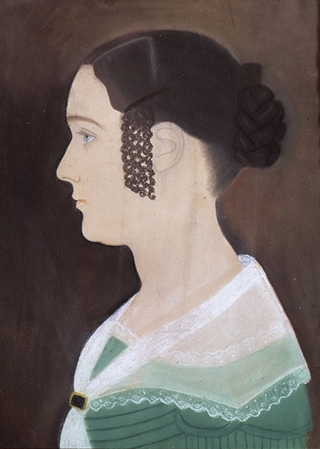
Ruth Henshaw Bascom, Cynthia Allen, Fitzwilliam, New Hampshire, 1840, private collection.

=== Overview ===
Bascom made portraits of friends and relatives when she lived with her husband, Reverend Bascom, in Ashby. She made life-size bust profiles with pastels on paper. She continued making portraits following her husband's death. In her diary, Bascom made reference to more than 1,400 portraits, of which 185 to 215 are known to exist. Bascom enjoyed children and about one-third of the portraits made were of them. She made most of her pastel crayon portraits when she lived in Gill, Massachusetts, in the 1830s.

Bascom and Susanna Paine were two of 11 or more women who worked as professional itinerant portraitists in the late 18th and early 19th centuries.

Her artistic productivity was facilitated by a way of life that strongly emphasized community as well as family involvement, and was further nurtured by a penchant for travel in New England.

— Lois S. Avigad

Bascom sometimes received no payment for her portraits when they were gifts or people could not afford to pay. Other times, she accepted barter or received a payment of US$1 to $3, depending upon the quality of the frame. When she made the portrait of Fanny Goodnow Parmenter in 1829, she was given $2.25 (equivalent to $68 in 2025) to pay for glass and the picture.

=== Compositions ===
Bascom started making portraits in 1801 by tracing the shadow cast of the sitter by lamp- or candlelight on drawing paper placed on a wall in a dark room. At that time, cutting profiles was a popular parlor game and an inexpensive form of art. She apparently made few portraits in the first decade or so of the 19th century; she recorded making portraits just seven times between 1801 and 1808, and there was no mention of profiles again until 1818, when she made them of the recently deceased son and wife of A. Gould. In 1819 she began making profiles in the evenings. The subject's features and other details were drawn with a pencil.

Bascom had two methods for creating portraits. Until the mid-1820s features were identified by cuts made on the portrait paper under which was a dark background. She began creating collages in 1828 with clothing cut from paper—metal foil was used for buttons, jewelry and eyeglass frames—which were layered on the cut-out of the subject's head and neck. "Her portrait of Elizabeth Cummings Low (1829) is one such collage composition pasted onto a slate blue ground; the crisp photographic lines are evocative of the shadow-tracing process," according to Lois S. Avigad. In rare cases, she used silk ribbons in the work.

In the mid-1830s she began to create portraits drawn on one sheet of paper. Background might be brown or blue pastel, include dark green trees or ruffle curtains, or suggest an oval inner frame by adding convex arcs in the upper corners with spandrel corners. She continued for a period of time to also create the collage-style portraits.

== Death ==
Bascom died on February 15, 1848, in Ashby, Massachusetts. Most of her portraits, dated from the 1830s, were found in Franklin County, Massachusetts.

== Collections ==
- American Folk Art Museum, New York City
- American Museum in Britain, Claverton Manor, Bath, England
- Daughters of the American Revolution Museum, Washington D.C.
- Deerfield Academy, Massachusetts
- Fenimore Art Museum, Cooperstown, New York
- Fitzwilliam Historical Society, New Hampshire
- Five Colleges and Historic Deerfield Museum Consortium
- Leicester Library, Massachusetts
- Memorial Hall Museum, Massachusetts
- Museum of Fine Arts, Boston
- Old Sturbridge Village, Massachusetts
- Philadelphia Museum of Art, Pennsylvania
- Winterthur Museum, Garden and Library, Delaware
- Worcester Art Museum, Massachusetts

== Works ==
This is a partial list of Bascom's works:

- Woman on Blue Background, pastel, c. 1800
- Fanny Goodnow Parmenter, pastel and pencil on paper, 1829, Goodnow Library Collection, Sudbury, MA
- Eliza Ann Hubbard (1826–1901), pastel and pencil on paper, 1830, private collection
- Ellen Jane Hubbard, 1830
- Ezekiel Lysander Bascom (1777–1841), pastel on paper, c. 1830, Historic Deerfield, Massachusetts
- George B. Hubbard, 1830
- Jane Marshall Wood (1833-1841), graphite and pastel on paper, c. 1835, Memorial Hall Museum, Massachusetts
- Jonathan A. Hubbard, 1830
- Self-portrait, pastel on paper, c. 1830, Old Sturbridge Village, Massachusetts
- Thomas Cushing Barr (1823–1872), pastel and pencil on paper, 1834, private collection
- Cutout Profile of a Lady, c. 1835, Philadelphia Museum of Art, Pennsylvania
- Eliza Jane Fay, 1840, Fenimore Art Museum, Cooperstown, New York
- Self-portrait, pastel on paper, c. 1840, Historic Deerfield, Massachusetts
- Three Pastel Heads, unknown date, Deerfield Academy, Massachusetts
- Miss Nancy Rawson (c. 1757-1848), watercolor drawing, unknown date, Leicester Library, Massachusetts
