= Ebenezer Adams =

American educator (1765–1841)

- Born: 2 October 1765
- Died: 15 August 1841 (aged 75)
- Spouse: Beulah Minot & Alice Frink
- Children: 7
- Parent(s): Ephraim Adams and Rebecca Locke Adams

Ebenezer Adams (2 October 1765 – 15 August 1841) was an American educator. He was born to Ephraim Adams and Rebecca Locke Adams in 1765.

He graduated with honor from Dartmouth College in 1791, and became the academic preceptor of Leicester, Massachusetts the following year. In 1795, he married Alice Frink, with whom he had five children. He became the first professor of mathematics and natural philosophy at the Phillips Exeter Academy. In 1807, he married Beulah Minot, with whom he had two children. In 1809, he was made the professor of languages at Dartmouth College. He remained in that position through 1833. Adams was elected a Fellow of the American Academy of Arts and Sciences in 1812, and elected a member of the American Antiquarian Society in 1813. He also served as president of the Bible Society of New Hampshire. He died in 1841.
