= Susanna Paine =

American artist (1792–1862)

- Born: June 9, 1792; Rehoboth, Massachusetts
- Died: November 10, 1862 (aged 70); Providence, Rhode Island
- Known for: Portraits
- Spouse: James Phillips (1819–1823, divorced)

Susanna Paine, also known as Susannah and Susan (June 9, 1792 – November 10, 1862), was an American portrait artist in New England in the 19th century. She published poetry, a Christmas hymn, a novel, and an autobiography entitled Roses and Thorns, or Recollections of an Artist.

As a young girl, she was an excellent student, but needed to quit school at the age of 11 to care for her ill grandmother. At 15, she taught school and a year later joined an academy in Providence, Rhode Island, where she earned her way through school by making and selling needlework. She graduated with highest honors and established a school that she operated for years. Paine gave the profits to her family, and she helped support them throughout most of her life.

She had a short marriage characterized by abuse and control. A child was born to the couple, but died 11 months later. Before the child's birth, Paine had left her husband and obtained a divorce. To support herself, she taught school for a period and then began to work as a portraitist. She traveled throughout Rhode Island, Massachusetts, and Maine accepting commissions for portraits of individuals or families from 1826 through 1862. Because she lived a mobile lifestyle, she had few long-lasting relationships. The closest personal relationship of her life was with her mother. She raised a girl, however, for three years and taught her how to paint. Once she became a professional portraitist she had periods of financial security, but that and her physical health vacillated over the course of her career.

== Early life ==
Susanna Paine, born in Rehoboth, Massachusetts, on June 9, 1792, was the second child of James Paine (b. 1764–65) and Mary Chaffee Paine (1767–1849). Her father was a mariner. When she was a young girl, he was lost at sea. She then lived with her maternal grandparents, Reverend Jonathan Chaffee and Mary Chaffee. Paine, an excellent student, attended school until she was 11 years of age, when she was needed to help care for her ill grandmother. The following year she nearly died as the result of a lightning strike that killed the person standing beside her. Believed to have died, she resumed consciousness after one hour, but suffered from seizures for several years after the incident. Her mother married widower Nathaniel Thurber on April 9, 1808, and the combined household, including his four children, moved to a Foster, Rhode Island, farm.

At 15 years of age, Paine taught school and then attended "the best Academy in Rhode Island", which she financed through the sales of her needlework. (Note: It was not unusual for girls attending academies in Providence to create "elegantly wrought needlework" and a poor student like Paine could sell them to pay for her schooling.) Paine learned how to paint with watercolor at the academy and graduated with the highest honors; she was sufficiently trained "to teach any of the common branches of education." Upon graduation Paine established a school near her mother and stepfather's house. The profits she made from the school were given to her mother and on one occasion loaned to her stepfather.

Reluctantly, and at her mother's insistence, she married James Phillips on November 4, 1819. Her husband—a gambler—was abusive, tyrannical and cruel. According to Paine, she left her husband after "one year and two months of cruel bondage". Paine returned to her mother's house and three months later gave birth to her son on August 30, 1821. The child, Theodore Winthrop Phillips, died 11 months later. The Rhode Island Supreme Court granted Paine a divorce from her husband in 1821 or 1823. Paine was left destitute, receiving no alimony and relinquishing previously owned property.

Paine resumed teaching and painted portraits to supplement her earnings, allowing her to support herself and send money to her mother, stepfather and their family, who had moved to Connecticut. Up to this point her life had been one of turmoil and financial precariousness. Rather than marry another man to secure a better standard of living, she developed a career so that she could support herself.

I was very diligent: toiling incessantly at my easel, until the picture was finished: when I viewed it with great complacency, (artist like) and called Mrs. R., my patron and landlady, to look at it for the first time. She entered with an anxious, doubting look—but at the first glance she started back, in surprise—then fell into perfect rapture, declaring it was "most excellent"... The next day, the house was "inundated" with callers. They entered my "sanctum" with eager looks, to see whither [sic]—a woman could paint a likeness? When lo, they all applauded, beyond my most sanguine hopes—or expectations.

— Susanna Paine

== Artist ==
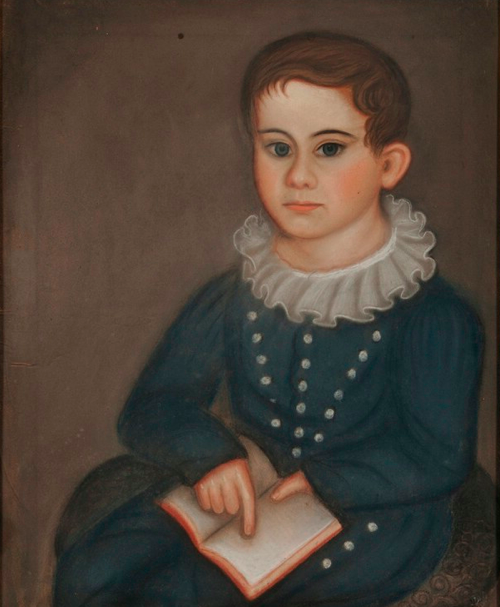
George Morillo Bartol, pastel on paper, 1827, private collection

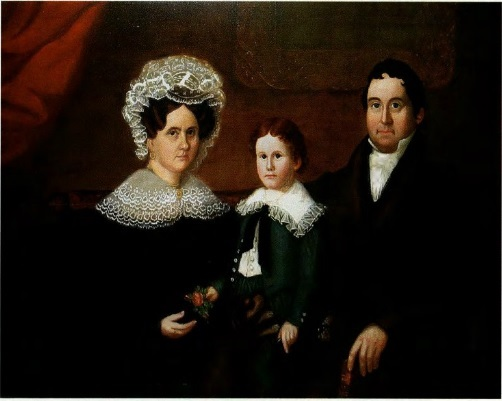
Susanna Paine, Eliza and Sheldon Battey and their son Thomas Sheldon Battey Providence, Rhode Island, oil on wood, 1830, private collection

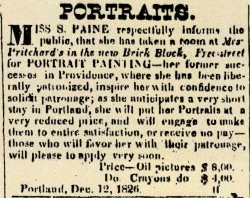
Portrait ad by Susanna Paine, Portland, December 12, 1826

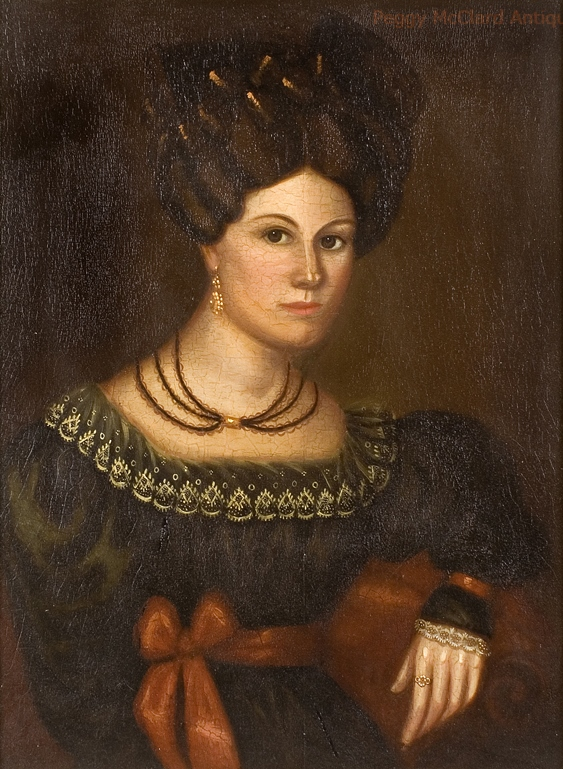
Portrait of a Lady

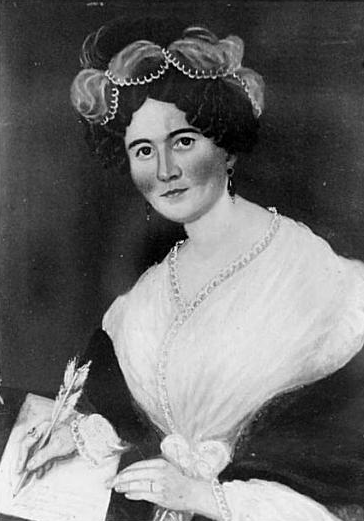
Catherine R. Williams, c. 1830, oil on wood, Rhode Island Historical Society

Paine worked as a professional portrait painter by traveling through New England and placing advertisements in local newspapers to solicit business. She and Ruth Henshaw Bascom were two of 11 or more women who worked as professional itinerant portraitists in the late 18th and early 19th centuries.

In many ways, her [Paine's] career typified the itinerant portraitist in the early nineteenth-century United States. Her anxiety over commissions, the constant threat of poverty and corresponding need for mobility in search of work, would have been familiar to contemporary American painters both male and female.

— Laura Prieto, author of At Home in the Studio

Paine was "a woman of stalwart proportions, weighing over 200 pounds, and was a very original character..." She was also described as an idealist. Paine was subject to criticism for traveling alone as a woman, but found it was safe to stay in boarding houses, secured through "several letters of introduction" from trusted people. To establish herself as a "genteel" artist, she studied art at the Boston Athenæum, stayed at upscale boarding houses, and became a published writer.

Throughout her career, Paine generally made oil paintings on 1/2 inch wood panels of which the sides and back were washed in red, gray-green, or green-blue. The subjects of the paintings were often portrayed in a confident manner in half-length poses. Their accessories, hair, and clothing were often "elaborately detailed". The placement of hands, tables, and other objects could be awkward. She had a tendency to paint the sitters with long hands, light flesh tones, doelike eyes and round faces. Paine was known to take liberties in the portrayal of her subjects; she once painted a gray-eyed man's portrait with black eyes because she thought they were more attractive.

=== Maine ===
She traveled alone for the first time in 1826 to Portland, Maine, and placed a business advertisement in the December 12 edition of the Portland Advertiser. The standard rate for large oil portraits at that time was US$20–$30, but Paine advertised $8 for large portraits. Not having received any leads for work, she placed a January ad with a testimonial, which said that her portrait's were a good likeness of the subject and well executed—and that women might find "a pride and pleasure in patronizing a female artist." Once she made a painting for her landlady and neighbors saw it, she began to receive commissions for her work.

Paine worked in southern Maine, Portland, and New Hampshire in 1827 and 1828. Initially, she had sufficient commissions to support the rental of a furnished parlor, an office for painting, and another office to exhibit her portraits. A religious woman, Paine adopted simpler clothing as a spiritual practice during this time. As her health declined, she engaged nursing services, which left her short of funds. Paine answered a friend's request to return to Providence to paint her dying daughter, and still in poor health, stayed there several months.

Paine worked as an artist in Maine until about 1831. One of her subjects while in Portland was George Morillo Bartol, her portrait of him sold for US$38,513 on March 6, 2011.

=== Massachusetts ===
She received formal art training at the Boston Athenæum around 1832 and spent the following summer in Cape Ann. Paine, one of the first artists to paint on Cape Ann, returned for several years, interrupted by visits to her mother each spring and fall. She was in the village of Annisquam on Cape Ann by 1834, when she painted portraits of families. Paine continued to paint on the cape during the 1830s and 1840s. She found it to be a unique place:

The scenery was delightful; and the people just to my liking... No one was very rich, and no one very poor; they all seemed on an equality... Kindness, benevolence and good will, were the most prominent traits of their lives, and characters.

— Susanna Paine

She raised a girl, who she called her adopted daughter, from 12 to 15 years of age. During that time Paine taught her to paint and they lived for a few months in Fall River, Massachusetts. During a visit to her mother and stepfather's farm, she found that her younger half-brother, Nathaniel, had secured the deed to the farm and lived in the main house; her parents lived in "a sort of out-house". Months later, after her half-brother sold the farm, Paine found them "looking sad and dejected" with Nathaniel in South Killingly, Connecticut, and made arrangements for her mother and step-father to live in an apartment.

=== Rhode Island ===
In 1830, Paine painted the portrait of author, Catharine R. Williams, who wrote poetry, Religion at Home, and the Lives of William Barton and Stephen Olney. The portrait was given to the Rhode Island Historical Society in 1885 from a group of members of the society, including Henry J. Steere. From about 1836, she had a residence in Providence, Rhode Island and kept her parents in "comfortable support". Between 1836 and 1838, she wrote and published a Christmas hymn and poetry. She enjoyed a successful professional life until 1842 when she left town for her safety during the Dorr Rebellion. She went to Cape Ann and after a few months returned to Providence. She became ill and, unable to find work in both places, suffered financially. Her mother came to live with her in Providence following the death of her stepfather, Nathaniel Thurber, in November, 1848. The following March, her mother Mary died during a visit to her half-brother who then lived in Hartford, Connecticut. She had supported her parents since she was a teenaged girl.

=== Later years ===
Paine traveled through Maine, where she had difficulty establishing herself for want of connections that she had relied upon in the past, so she returned to Providence and for the first time established herself in a highly respectable commercial building with, aside from herself, only male occupants. She struggled professionally and, because of the loss of her mother, she suffered personally. The career that she relied upon kept her forever traveling, which had made it difficult to establish long-standing relationships. Her relationship with her mother was the only close one of her life.

She published her autobiography, Roses and Thorns, or Recollections of an Artist in 1854. Six years later she published Wait and See, a Victorian novel. She died in Providence, Rhode Island on November 10, 1862.

A file containing papers, photographs, exhibition catalogs and other archival material is held at the Brooklyn Museum Libraries & Archives and the Frick Art Reference Library of the Frick Collection.

== Collections ==
- Cape Ann Museum, Gloucester, Massachusetts
- Maine State Museum, Augusta, Maine
- Portland Museum of Art, Maine
- Rhode Island Historical Society, Providence, Rhode Island

== Works ==
- Sally Ellery Ryerson Merchant, oil on canvas, c. 1825–1835, Cape Ann Historical Association
- Catherine Read Arnold Williams, oil on wood, c. 1830 John Brown House Museum, Rhode Island Historical Society
- Eliza and Sheldon Battey and their son Thomas Sheldon Battey, Providence, Rhode Island, oil on wood, 1830, private collection
- George Morillo Bartol, pastel on paper, 1827
- Portrait of Mrs. J. H. Corbett, oil on panel, 1832, Portland Museum of Art, Maine
- Gideon Lane, III, oil on wood, 1833, Cape Ann Historical Association
- Hannah Griffin Lane, oil, 1833, Cape Ann Historical Association
- Eliza Harper Peabody Lane, oil on wood, 1833, Cape Ann Historical Association
- Hannah Fuller Smith Stanwood, oil, 1834, Cape Ann Historical Association
- Lucy Kinsman Brown Davis, oil on wood, c. 1835, Cape Ann Historical Association
- The Oldridge Family, four oil on wood panel portraits, 1839, private collection
- Portrait of a Lady in a Lace Cap, oil, Portland Museum of Art
