= Pliny Earle (physician) =

American psychiatrist

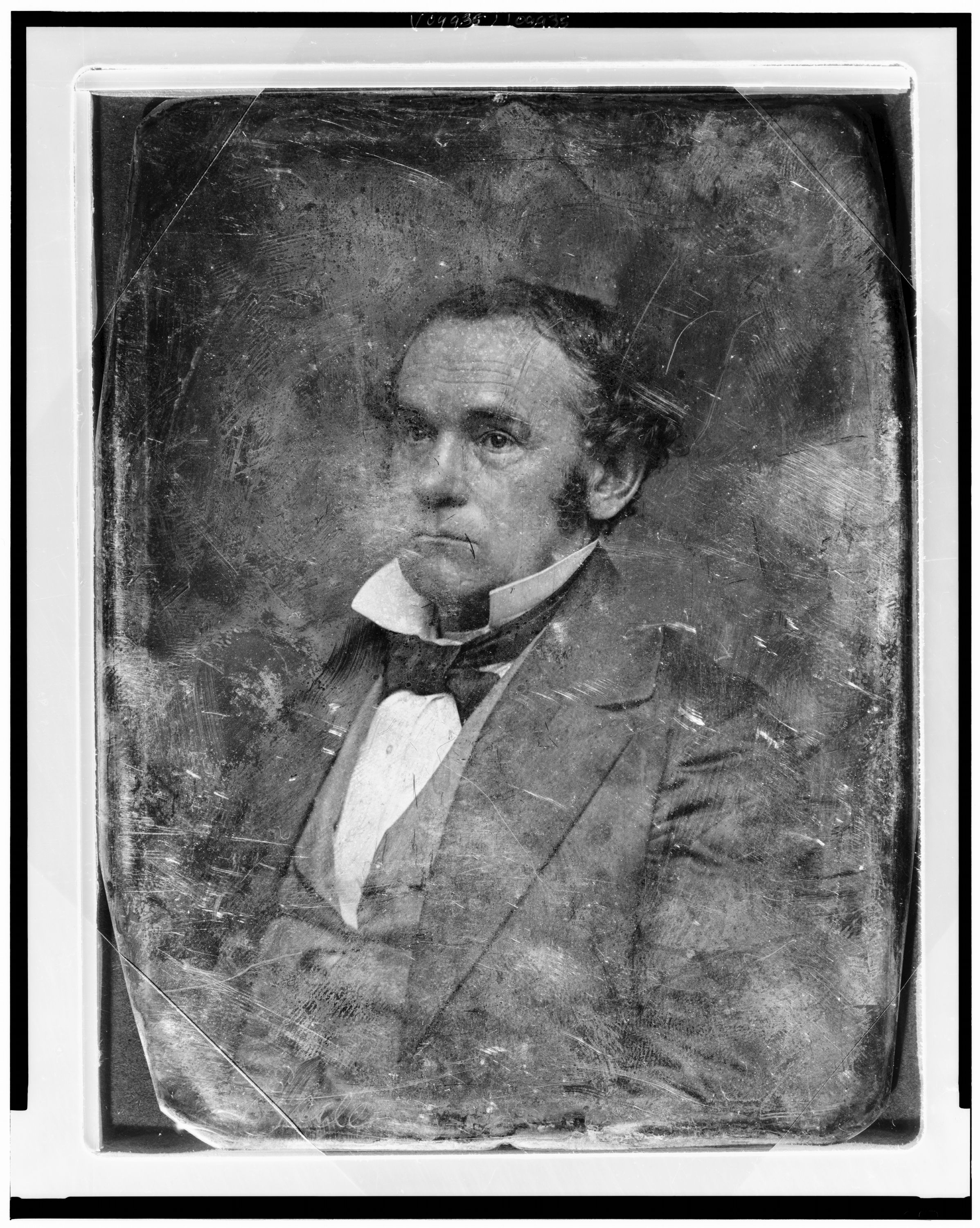
- Pliny Earle
- Born: December 31, 1809; Leicester, Massachusetts, U.S.
- Died: May 17, 1892 (aged 82); Northampton, Massachusetts, U.S.
- Resting place: Bridge Street Cemetery, Northampton, Massachusetts
- Education: University of Pennsylvania School of Medicine
- Occupations: Physician, psychiatrist
- Organizations: American Medical Association; Association of Medical Superintendents of American Institutions for the Insane; New England Psychological Society; New York Academy of Medicine
- Known for: Superintendent of Northampton State Hospital; reform of asylum statistics; early leader in American psychiatry
- Notable work: Publications on mental illness and asylum reform
- Relatives: Pliny Earle I (father)

Pliny Earle II, MD (December 31, 1809 – May 17, 1892) was an American physician, psychiatrist, and poet. He was the son of the inventor Pliny Earle of the Earle family.

== Biography ==
Pliny Earle was born in Leicester, Massachusetts, on December 31, 1809. He graduated from the University of Pennsylvania School of Medicine in 1837, then studied in the hospitals of Paris, and visited institutions for the insane in European countries. In 1840 he became resident physician of the asylum for the insane (now known as Friends Hospital) at Frankford, Pennsylvania (now part of Philadelphia), where he remained two years. From April 1844 till April 1849, he was physician to Bloomingdale asylum, in New York. He immediately afterward visited insane hospitals in Europe. In 1853 he was appointed visiting physician to the New York City lunatic asylum, and in the same year delivered a course of lectures on mental disorders at the College of physicians and surgeons, New York. In 1863 he became professor of materia medica and psychology at Berkshire Medical College Pittsfield, Massachusetts, the first professorship of mental diseases ever established by a medical College in the United States. His lectures there were limited to the one course of 1864, owing to his appointment as superintendent and physician-in-chief of the state hospital for the insane in Northampton, Massachusetts. He held this place until October 1885. He was elected as a member to the American Philosophical Society in 1866.

In 1871 he visited forty-six institutions for the insane in Europe. Dr. Earle was, so far as known, the first person that ever addressed an audience of the insane in any other than a religious discourse. His introduction of lectures on natural philosophy at the Frankford asylum, in the winter of 1840–1841, was the initiative to a system of combined instruction and entertainment, which has been widely adopted, and is now considered essential to the highest perfection of an institution for the insane. In the winter of 1866–1867, at the hospital in Northampton, he delivered a course of lectures on insanity before audiences in which the average number of insane persons was about 250.

He was also a founder of the American Medical Association, the New York Academy of Medicine, the Association of Medical Superintendents of American Institutions for the Insane, and the New England Psychological Society.

He died in Northampton on May 17, 1892.

== Publications ==
- A Visit to Thirteen Asylums for the Insane in Europe (1840)
- The History, Description, and Statistics of the Bloomingdale Asylum (1848)
- Institutions for the Insane in Prussia, Germany, and Austria (1853)
- An Examination of the Practice of Bloodletting in Mental Disorders (1854)
- The Curability of Insanity (1887)
- Marathon and other Poems (1841)
