= Haverfield =

Haverfield is a surname. Notable people with the surname include:

- Evelina Haverfield (1867–1920), British suffragette
- Francis J. Haverfield (1860–1919), English historian
- James Wallace Haverfield (1917-1941), Ensign Haverfield served in the Navy and was killed on December 7, 1941, while onboard the U.S.S. Arizona. The U.S.S. Haverfield was named in his honor.
- John Haverfield (1744–1820), English gardener and landscape architect
- John Haverfield Sr (1694–1784), English gardener and landscape architect
- Oriska Worden (born Oriska Haverfield, 1868–1954), American actress and singer
- Robert M. Haverfield (1918–1980), American politician and judge from Florida
