= Pliny Chase =

American scientist, mathematician, and educator (1820–1886)

- Born: Pliny Earle Chase; August 18, 1820; Worcester, Massachusetts, U.S.
- Died: December 17, 1886 (aged 66); Haverford, Pennsylvania, U.S.
- Education: Harvard University
- Occupations: Scientist, mathematician, and educator
- Spouse: Elizabeth Brown Oliver (m. 1843)
- Children: 6
- Relatives: Pliny Earle I (grandfather); Thomas Chase (brother); Lucy Chase (sister)
- Awards: Magellanic gold medal

Pliny Earle Chase (August 18, 1820, in Worcester, Massachusetts – December 17, 1886, in Haverford, Pennsylvania) was an American scientist, mathematician, and educator who contributed to the fields of astronomy, electromagnetism, and cryptography, among others.

== Biography ==
He graduated at Harvard in 1839, then taught in Philadelphia and engaged in business for many years, but employed his leisure in physical and philological studies. In 1863, he was elected a member of the American Antiquarian Society and the American Philosophical Society. In 1864, the Magellanic gold medal of the American Philosophical Society was awarded him for his Numerical Relations of Gravity and Magnetism. The results of other mathematical and physical researches were published from time to time in the Proceedings of the American Philosophical Society, and brought him a worldwide reputation as a man of unusual scientific powers and attainments. In 1871, he became a member of the faculty of Haverford College, Pennsylvania, and for a long time was professor of philosophy and logic. He published Elements of Meteorology (1884).

== Family ==
His brother Thomas Chase was a noted Latin scholar. His mother, Lydia Earle Chase, was the daughter of the famous inventor Pliny Earle. Pliny Chase had two brothers and three sisters. His sister Lucy Chase (1822–1909) was a noted abolitionist, supporter of women's suffrage and the temperance movement, and teacher in contraband camps and freedman schools in the American South. Upon his death, Pliny Chase left a widow, two sons and three daughters.
