= Thomas Chase (educator) =

President of Haverford College; 1827–1892

- Born: 1827; Worcester, Massachusetts, U.S.
- Died: 1892 (aged 64–65)
- Education: Harvard University; University of Berlin; Collège de France
- Occupations: Educator and classical scholar
- Relatives: Pliny Chase (brother)

Thomas Chase (1827–1892) was a United States educator and classical scholar. He was on the faculty of Haverford College and later its president.

== Biography ==
Chase was born in Worcester, Massachusetts, United States, to Anthony and Lydia (Earle) Chase. At nine years of age, he was introduced to Latin; Greek at ten. He graduated in 1848 at Harvard University. Beginning in 1850, he served as a substitute Latin professor at Harvard for a year, and another year and a half as an instructor, and then a tutor.

He studied in Europe from 1853 to 1855, at the University of Berlin and the Collège de France mainly, and as a listener at other universities. He was professor of Greek and Latin at Haverford College from 1855 to 1875. He was elected as a member of the American Philosophical Society in 1864. From 1875 to 1886, he was president of Haverford. In 1887, Chase was elected a member of the American Antiquarian Society. He was a member of the American committee for the revision of the New Testament, and a delegate to the Stockholm Philological Congress of 1889.

== Publications ==
- Hellas: Her Monuments and Scenery (1863; at Internet Archive)
- An address on the character and example of President Lincoln (1865; at Internet Archive)
- A Latin Grammar (1882; at Internet Archive)

His "Use of Italics in the English Bible" was part of an 1879 pamphlet issued by the Bible revision committee.

=== Editions ===
- Cicero's Tusculan disputations: book first, the dream of Scipio and extracts from the dialogues on old age and friendship (1866)
- Horace (1884; at Internet Archive)
- The histories of Livy (1882; at Internet Archive)
- Virgil, The Æneid (1884; at Internet Archive)
- Selections from the Satires of Juvenal (1885; at Internet Archive)

== Family ==
He was a brother of Pliny Chase.
