= Leicester, Massachusetts =

- Town
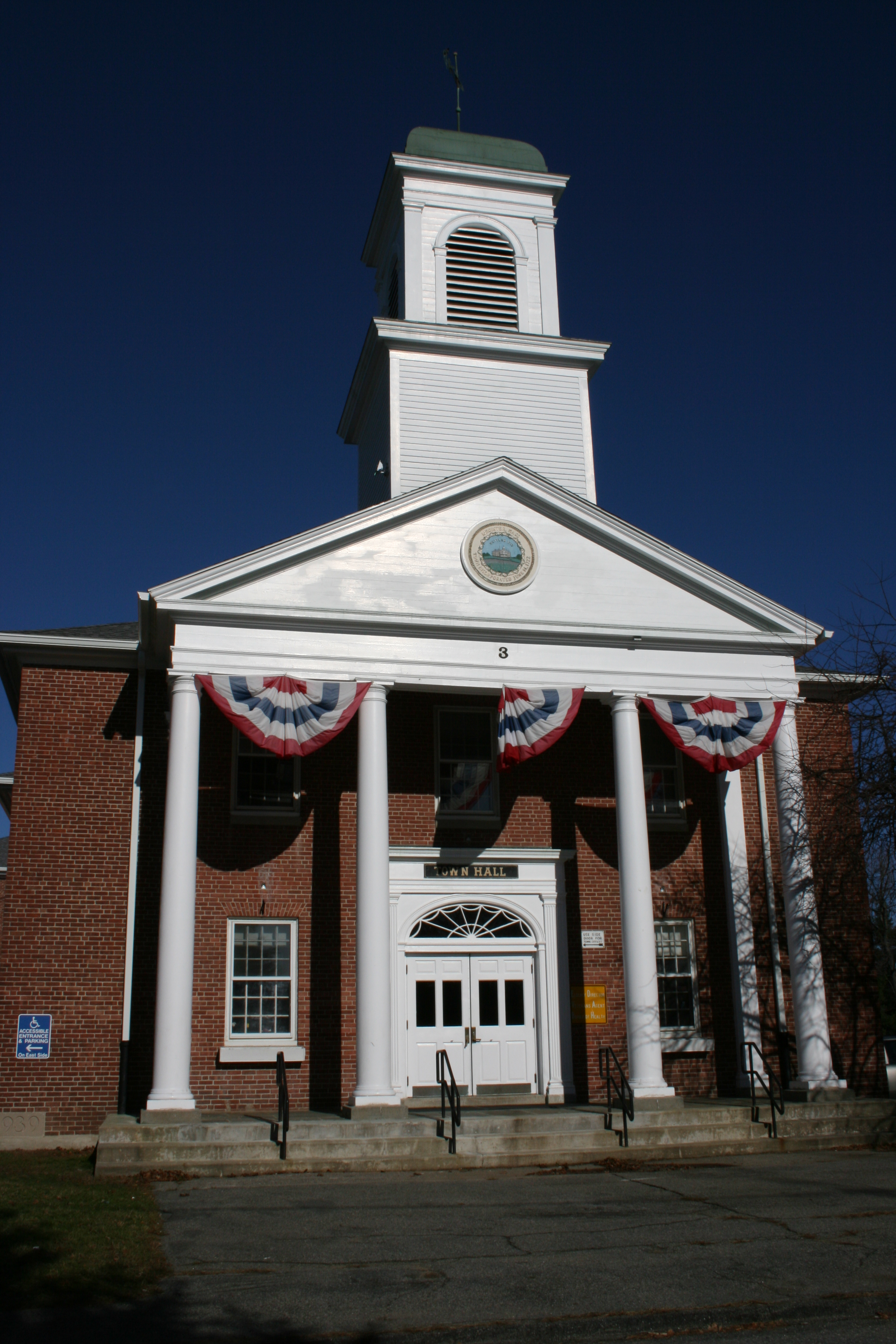
- Leicester Town Hall

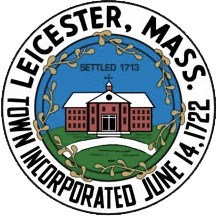
- Seal

- Location in Worcester County and the state of Massachusetts.
- Coordinates: 42°14′45″N 71°54′33″W
- Country: United States
- State: Massachusetts
- County: Worcester
- Settled: 1713
- Incorporated: 1714

Government
  - Type: Open town meeting
  - Town Administrator: David A. Genereux
  - Board of Selectmen: Dianna Provencher (Chair) (2026); John Bujak (2025); Kevin Menard Sr. (2026); Doug Belanger (2027); Peter Cusolito (2027)
  - Superintendent of Schools: Dr. Brett Kustigian
  - School Committee: Donna McCance(Chair); Scott Weikel (Vice Chair); Dylan Lambert; Jonathon Boisjolie; Nathan Hagglund

Area
  - Total: 24.7 sq mi (63.9 km^{2})
  - Land: 23.4 sq mi (60.5 km^{2})
  - Water: 1.3 sq mi (3.4 km^{2})
- Elevation: 1,010 ft (308 m)

Population (2020)
  - Total: 11,087
  - Density: 475/sq mi (183/km^{2})
- Time zone: UTC-5 (Eastern)
  - Summer (DST): UTC-4 (Eastern)
- ZIP Codes: 01524 (Leicester); 01542 (Rochdale); 01611 (Cherry Valley)
- Area code: 508 / 774
- FIPS code: 25-34795
- GNIS feature ID: 0619483
- Website: www.leicesterma.org

Leicester (/ˈlɛstər/ LEST-ər) is a town in Worcester County, Massachusetts, United States. The population was 11,087 at the 2020 United States census.

== History ==
What is now Leicester was originally settled by the Nipmuc people and was known by them as Towtaid. On January 27, 1686, the territory of eight square miles was purchased for 15 pounds by a company of nine proprietors engaged in land speculation: Joshua Lamb of Roxbury, Nathaniel Page of Bedford, Andrew Gardner of Roxbury, Benjamin Gamblin of Roxbury, Benjamin Tucker of Roxbury, John Curtice of Roxbury, Richard Draper of Boston, Samuel Ruggles of Roxbury, and Ralph Bradhurst of Roxbury. The proprietors called this land Strawberry Hill but did not make an effort to settle it for nearly 30 years due to its isolated location and the disruption of King Philip's War (1675–1678), King William's War (1688–1697), and Queen Anne's War (1702–1713).

Leicester was incorporated by a vote of the Massachusetts General Court on February 15, 1713, on the condition that the land be settled by 50 families within seven years. Upon the grant of the General Court, the proprietors immediately set about meeting the condition of the town's incorporation. Leicester was divided into two halves, the eastern half to be distributed among settlers and the western half retained and divided among the proprietors, who had grown in number to total 22. A combined 50 parcels (so-called "house-lots") of land with 30, 40, or 50 acres each was allotted to settlers for the eastern half of Leicester for one shilling per acre, with land also set aside for schools, churches, and mills. The purchaser of each parcel was required to settle a family on their house-lot and each received 100 additional acres in another part of town for every 10 acres in their house-lot.

The town was named after Leicester, England. First selectman Samuel Green suggested the use of the name as it was where his father had originated. One of the early settlers in town was Dr. Samuel Green, who lived in a house at 2 Charlton St. in Greenville. Dr. Green trained many other doctors in the early 1700s. This constituted the first medical school in Massachusetts. The Green family was involved in the creation of both Worcester's Green Hill Park and New York City's Central Park.

First (Congregational) Church was organized in 1718 and a Baptist church in Greenville was organized in 1737.

By 1744, the western part of the town, which had been a district, distinct from the eastern half from the beginning, was established as the western parish. That part of Leicester was then incorporated as the separate town of Spencer in 1753. In 1765, the northernmost part of Leicester was taken to form half of the newly incorporated district of Paxton. These districts had most of the powers of a town except that they shared a representative in the General Court with Leicester until the outbreak of the Revolutionary War in 1775. Three years after that, the southeastern part of town was taken to form the northwestern quarter of the newly incorporated town of Ward, later renamed Auburn.

Although no significant battles of the American Revolution were fought in the area, Leicester citizens played a large role in the conflict's start. At a Committee of Safety meeting in 1774, Leicester's Colonel William Henshaw declared that "we must have companies of men ready to march upon a minute's notice"—coining the term "minutemen", a nickname for the rapid-response militia members who fought in the revolution's first battles. Henshaw would later become an adjutant general to Artemas Ward, who was second in command to George Washington in the Continental Army.

Before the British troops marched to Lexington and Concord, looking for the ammunition and equipment held by the Americans, that ammunition and equipment was moved further West to four locations in the town of Leicester, including the house Dr. Green built at 2 Charlton Street. This information can be found in books held on reserve in the Leicester Public Library. When they heard that the British had attacked, Leicester's own Minutemen gathered on Leicester Common. They marched quickly to join with other Minutemen on April 19, 1775, to fight at the first conflict between Massachusetts residents and British troops, the Battles of Lexington and Concord. A few months later on June 17, 1775, a freed slave and Leicester resident named Peter Salem fought at the Battle of Bunker Hill, where he killed British Major John Pitcairn. Both men are memorialized in Leicester street names (Peter Salem Road, Pitcairn Avenue), as is Colonel Henshaw (Henshaw Street).

General Knox brought cannons from New York through the town of Leicester, delivering them to General Washington at Dorchester Heights. There is a monument near the Leicester Library to mark that route. These cannons caused the British to evacuate their troops from Boston, after they woke up one morning to find cannons facing them from above them.

Leicester also held a leading role in Massachusetts' second great revolution, the coming of industrialization. As early as the 1780s, Leicester's mills churned out one-third of American hand cards, which were tools for straightening fibers before spinning thread and weaving cloth. By the 1890s when Leicester industry began to fade, the town was producing one-third of all hand and machine cards in North America.

Ruth Henshaw Bascom (1772–1848), the wife of Reverend Ezekial Lysander Bascom and daughter of Colonel William Henshaw and Phebe Swan, became America's premier portrait folk artist and pastelist, producing over one thousand portraits from 1789 to 1846.

Eli Whitney, the man who invented the cotton gin and devised the idea of interchangeable parts, went to school at Leicester Academy, which eventually became Leicester High School. Ebenezer Adams, who would later be the first mathematics and natural philosophy professor at the Phillips Exeter Academy in New Hampshire, was the academic preceptor in Leicester in 1792. Leicester's Pliny Earle helped Samuel Slater build the first American mill in Pawtucket, Rhode Island, by building the first carding machine. This began the American Industrial Revolution. Leicester today is one of the northernmost communities within the Blackstone River Valley, National Heritage Corridor. Its early role with carding machines, and the role that Pliny Earle played with the first water-powered mill at Pawtucket, complete the case for inclusion on Leicester in this Federal NPS historic designation.

Other social leaders who came from Leicester include Charles Adams, military officer and foreign minister, born in town; Emory Washburn, Harvard Law professor and governor of Massachusetts from 1854 to 1855; and Samuel May, a pastor and active abolitionist in the 1860s, whose house was a stop on the Underground Railroad. He also served as secretary of the Massachusetts Anti-Slave Society. His house has become a part of the Becker College campus.

In 2005, the Worcester Telegram & Gazette named Leicester one of Central Massachusetts' top ten sports towns.

== Geography ==
According to the United States Census Bureau, the town has a total area of 24.7 square miles (64 km^{2}), of which 23.4 square miles (61 km^{2}) is land and 1.3 square miles (3.4 km^{2}), or 5.35%, is water.

Leicester includes four distinct villages—Leicester Center, Cherry Valley (the eastern side of town, near Worcester), Rochdale (a crossroads in the southeastern corner, near the Oxford line), and Greenville (now considered to be part of Rochdale). Cherry Valley and Rochdale have separate ZIP codes from the rest of the town (01611 and 01542, respectively), but otherwise the village boundaries have no official significance, although some Cherry Valley, Rochdale, and Leicester have three separate and distinct water districts and four sewer districts. The village of Greenville is now considered part of Rochdale, as it falls within the 01542 ZIP code; the former villages of Mannville and Lakeside were destroyed to construct the Kettle Brook reservoir system, in northeastern Leicester, to supply water to Worcester.

The town is cut into quarters by two state highways, east–west Route 9 and north–south Route 56. Route 9 is called Main Street through Cherry Valley and most of the rest of town; it follows a bypass alignment called South Main Street around the Washburn Square area. The town is actively trying to encourage business development along the western end of Route 9. Route 56 north of the Leicester Center crossroads is Paxton Street; south, it is Pleasant Street until it detours along a bypass road, Huntoon Memorial Highway, that skirts the edge of Rochdale.

Spencer, now a separate town to the west, was once part of Leicester. Other municipalities bordering Leicester include Paxton along Route 56 to the north, Worcester and Auburn on the east, and Oxford and Charlton on the south. Large parts of both Paxton and Auburn were also once part of Leicester.

The end of Worcester Regional Airport's longest runway, along with much of the airport's property, is in Leicester. Additionally, most of Worcester's Kettle Brook water reservoir system is in Leicester.

=== Climate ===
In a typical year, Leicester, Massachusetts temperatures fall below 50 °F (10 °C) for 195 days per year. Annual precipitation is typically 47.4 inches per year and snow covers the ground 60 days per year or 16.4% of the year (high in the US). The humidity is below 60% for approximately 25.4 days, or 7% of the year.

== Demographics ==
Historical population
Year	Pop.	±%
1790	1,076	—
1850	2,269	+110.9%
1860	2,748	+21.1%
1870	2,768	+0.7%
1880	2,779	+0.4%
1890	3,120	+12.3%
1900	3,416	+9.5%
1910	3,237	−5.2%
1920	3,635	+12.3%
1930	4,445	+22.3%
1940	4,851	+9.1%
1950	6,029	+24.3%
1960	8,177	+35.6%
1970	9,140	+11.8%
1980	9,446	+3.3%
1990	10,191	+7.9%
2000	10,471	+2.7%
2010	10,970	+4.8%
2020	11,087	+1.1%
2022	11,033	−0.5%
* = population estimate. Source: United States census records and Population Estimates Program data.

As of the census of 2000, there were 10,471 people, 3,683 households, and 2,707 families residing in the town. The population density was 448.3 inhabitants per square mile (173.1/km^{2}). There were 3,826 housing units at an average density of 163.8 per square mile (63.2/km^{2}). The racial makeup of the town was 96.29% White, 1.28% African American, 0.31% Native American, 0.74% Asian, 0.06% Pacific Islander, 0.31% from other races, and 1.01% from two or more races. Hispanic or Latino of any race were 1.75% of the population.

There were 3,683 households, out of which 35.3% had children under the age of 18 living with them, 59.1% were married couples living together, 10.5% had a female householder with no husband present, and 26.5% were non-families. Of all households, 21.9% were made up of individuals, and 9.3% had someone living alone who was 65 years of age or older. The average household size was 2.73 and the average family size was 3.21.

In the town, the population was spread out, with 26.0% under the age of 18, 9.2% from 18 to 24, 30.0% from 25 to 44, 22.5% from 45 to 64, and 12.4% who were 65 years of age or older. The median age was 36 years. For every 100 females, there were 94.7 males. For every 100 females age 18 and over, there were 90.5 males.

The median income for a household in the town was $55,039, and the median income for a family was $64,202. Males had a median income of $40,991 versus $27,913 for females. The per capita income for the town was $20,822. About 3.2% of families and 4.3% of the population were below the poverty line, including 4.3% of those under age 18 and 5.6% of those age 65 or over.

== Government ==
State government
State Representative(s):	David LeBeouf (D) 17th Worcester
State Senator(s):	Michael O. Moore (D)
Governor's Councilor(s):	Paul DePalo (D)
Federal government
U.S. Representative(s):	James P. McGovern (D-2nd District),
U.S. Senators:	Elizabeth Warren (D), Ed Markey (D)

The Town of Leicester is governed by a five-member Select Board. This board appoints a town administrator, who is responsible for executive decisions in running the town. They also appoint a Superintendent of Schools, who is responsible for the education department. There is a three-member Board of Health elected by the people of the town, which has separate powers to regulate health matters. These powers are derived directly from Mass General Law chapter 111.

The legislative body of the town it the town meeting, in which all registered voters of the town may participate in approving the annual budget for the following fiscal year of July 1 through June 30. There are typically two or more town meetings each year, the annual Spring town meeting, and a special town meeting held in the Fall, and occasional other special town meetings, called for by the selectmen as the need arises.

== Library ==
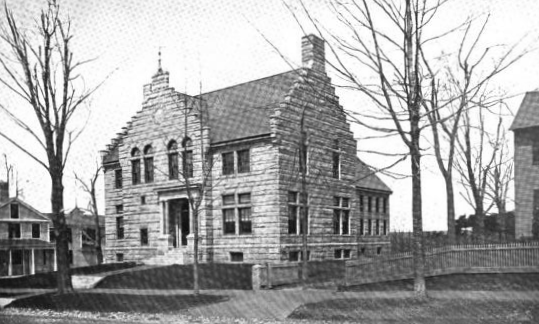
Leicester public library, 1899

The Leicester Public Library began in 1801. In fiscal year 2008, the town of Leicester spent 0.57% ($145,270) of its budget on its public library—approximately $13 per person, per year ($15.92 adjusted for inflation in 2021).

== Education ==
=== Public schools ===
Public school students in Leicester attend Leicester Elementary School (Grades K–4), Leicester Middle School (Grades 5–8) and Leicester High School (Grades 9–12). The high school maintains a rivalry with Auburn High School

Eighth graders at Leicester Middle School have a choice between going to Bay Path Regional Technical High School or Tantasqua Regional Technical High School for high school.

== Notable people ==
- Edward B. Wesley, co-founder of The New York Times, born in Leicester in 1811.
- Arthur Estabrook, researcher and eugenist, was born in Leicester in 1885
- David Henshaw, United States Secretary of the Navy, 1843–1844
- Samuel Joseph May, abolitionist, historian, pastor
- Emory Washburn, Governor of Massachusetts, 1854–1855; Harvard Law School professor, author of leading treatise on American property law, member of the American Antiquarian Society and author of a history of Leicester
- John R. Wilder, cotton merchant, born in 1816
