= Bobby Grier (American football player) =

American football player (1933–2024)

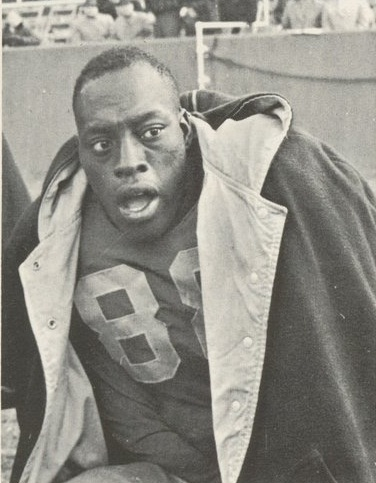
- Grier in 1956

Profile
- Positions: Fullback, linebacker, defensive back

Personal information
- Born: January 2, 1933; Massillon, Ohio, U.S.
- Died: June 30, 2024 (aged 91); Warren, Ohio, U.S.

Career information
- High school: Massillon Washington
- College: Pittsburgh (1952–1955)

Robert Warren Grier (January 2, 1933 – June 30, 2024) was an American college football player for the Pittsburgh Panthers. In 1956, he was the first African American football player to break the color barrier of the United States collegiate Sugar Bowl game, which was held in New Orleans. Particularly in the deep South, the mid-1950s was a period of strident racial segregation of sports, as well as other areas of life. At the time, Grier's participation as a fullback, linebacker and defensive back against a segregated all-white team on such a prestigious "stage" was a tremendously significant event.

== Biography ==
Grier grew up in Massillon, Ohio and played football for his high school team, the Massillon Tigers, for three years before playing college football at Pittsburgh. He majored in business administration and graduated in 1957. Grier later joined the Air Force and worked there for a number of years. He retired from military service to be an administrator at a Pittsburgh community college and remained active in the Pittsburgh community. In 2009, he was named a Washington High School Distinguished Citizen and later added to the Massillon Tiger Wall of Champions. In 2022 Grier's story along with his son Robert Grier Jr. and granddaughter Camille was featured in a documentary called Sky Blossom produced by Richard Lui. In October 2022, Bobby Grier was enshrined in Pitt Athletics Hall at Heinz Field alongside Georgia Tech's President's grandson Blake Van Leer, actor Anthony Mackie, fellow alumni and his family. Pitt's Director of Athletics Heather Lyke said, "Bobby Grier is a richly deserving honoree in our Pitt Athletics Hall of Fame". Grier is also a member of the Sugar Bowl Hall of Fame and the Western Chapter of the Pennsylvania Sports Hall of Fame and the “Wall of Champions” at Massillon (Ohio) High School. Grier and his son Robert Grier are closely involved with the Elizabeth Dole Foundation. His story has been featured on CNBC, History Channel, ESPN, The New York Times, and other media networks.

Grier died on June 30, 2024, at the age of 91. On July 7, Pitt announced the team will wear a commemorative helmet sticker throughout the 2024 season to honor Grier.

== 1956 Sugar Bowl ==
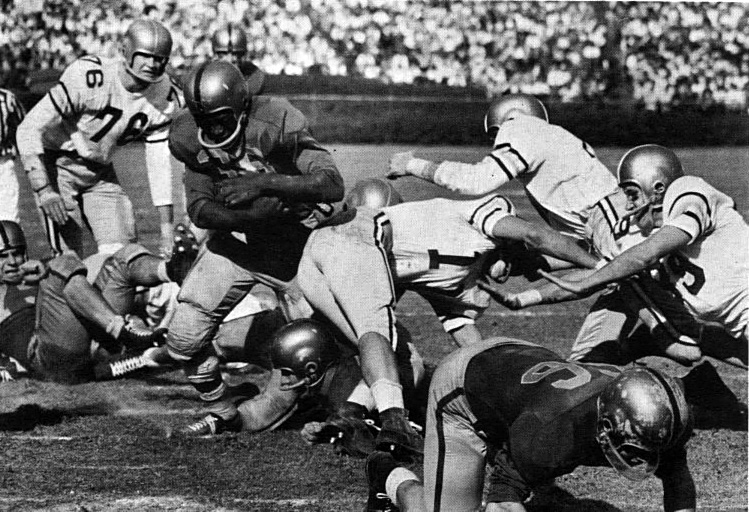
In 1956, Grier was the first to break the Sugar Bowl's color-barrier.

Much controversy preceded the 1956 Sugar Bowl, where Grier's Pitt Panthers would meet the Yellow Jackets from Georgia Tech. There was controversy over whether Grier should be allowed to play, and whether Georgia Tech would participate in the contest. Georgia Governor Marvin Griffin was very publicly opposed to racial integration. A measure for the tenor of this time period is the well-known case of Emmett Till being subjected to a lynching in Mississippi, which occurred the previous summer to the 1956 game. Additionally, in the month prior, Rosa Parks ignited the Montgomery bus boycott, where she, in protest, refused to relinquish her seat on a Montgomery, Alabama transit bus.

A large contingent from the New Orleans community, as well as many connected with Georgia Tech, openly fought to bar either Grier, Pitt, or the Yellow Jacket team from the game. Georgia Tech's president, coach, students, and football players from the Atlanta-based school, civil rights leaders from multiple locales, as well as a large number of the Pitt community, however, succeeded in seeing Grier take to the gridiron that January day.

In anticipation of Grier's presence against Georgia Tech, Georgia governor Marvin Griffin in December 1955 publicly sent a telegram to his state's Board Of Regents imploring that teams from Georgia not engage in racially integrated events which had blacks either as participants or in the stands. Georgia Tech's president Blake R Van Leer rejected this request. Griffin would later request that President Van Leer and Georgia Tech's players be punished, but Van Leer stuck to his statements, threatened to resign and later received a standing ovation from the faculty senate. Van Leer's stance would typically not serve an administrator in a Deep South institution well in the 1950s, however the prospect of any long-term professional consequences proved moot since he died of a heart attack only three weeks after the fateful bowl game.

Georgia Tech won the game 7–0. The margin of victory mostly resulted from a disputed first quarter 31-yard pass interference penalty which was called on Grier, giving Georgia Tech a first and goal on the Pitt 1-yard line. The Yellow Jackets scored the game's only touchdown on the next play. Photographic evidence later strongly indicated the referee's call was incorrect.

The irony of the bad call is that it was made by referee Rusty Coles, from the Pittsburgh area, who had no objective in making the wrong call, but simply made a mistake, which he admitted after seeing the game films.

Grier finished the game as its leading rusher with 51 yards. After the game, he protested the pass interference call, but praised the Georgia Tech players, saying "They were good sportsmen, perhaps the best I've played against all season. They played hard, but clean. It was a good game. But believe me. I didn't push that man."

Grier's participation in the 1956 Sugar Bowl, as well as the support he received from various communities, is seen by some experts as a milestone in American race relations.

In 2019, Grier was elected as a member of the Sugar Bowl Hall of Fame. On Oct 1, 2022, Georgia Tech and University of Pittsburgh played again. During the game, the 1956 Sugar Bowl and Grier were honored. Grier was also enshrined in the Pittsburgh Hall of Fame live on ACC Network and ESPN. Actor Anthony Mackie, Grier's son Rob, granddaughter Camille and President Van Leer's grandson Blake Van Leer III were present on the field.

Later in 2022, Grier along with his son Rob were invited for a VIP tour at Georgia Tech, College Football Hall of Fame and National Center for Civil and Human Rights. While at Georgia Tech, Grier met 1956's Georgia Tech's Quarterback Wade Mitchell for the first time since 1956. Georgia Tech's president Ángel Cabrera was there to meet with Grier. The Van Leer and Grier families remain close to this day.

== See also ==
- Pittsburgh Panthers football
- 1956 Sugar Bowl
