= Unconditional (2023 film) =

UNCONDITIONAL
- Theatrical release poster
- Directed by: Richard Lui
- Produced by: Alex Lo; Richard Lui
- Cinematography: Eliana Alvarez Martinez
- Edited by: Michelle Chang
- Music by: Maria Lineva
- Production company: Prisca
- Distributed by: AMC Theatres, Universal Pictures, and Deluxe (Theatrical Community Partnership); American Public Television (Broadcast); MSNBC (Cable)
- Release date: May 2, 2023 (World Premiere at Universal Studios Hollywood)
- Running time: 87 minutes
- Country: United States
- Language: English
- Budget: $1.5 million (USD)

UNCONDITIONAL is a 2023 American documentary film from MSNBC/NBC News anchor and filmmaker Richard Lui. Seven years in the making, it profiles three families at the intersection of mental health and caregiving as they turn the corner, showing the power of relearning how to love.

The film held its World Premiere at Universal Studios Hollywood on May 2, 2023. The documentary is the most widely distributed of 2023. It was released in select theaters nationwide through a theatrical community partnership of AMC Theatres, Universal Pictures and Deluxe. It is expected to be qualified for the 96th Academy Awards. The film was broadcast nationwide by distributor American Public Television, and debuted on cable on MSNBC as the top-rated program in its time slot.

On May 10, 2023, First Lady Jill Biden hosted a screening of the film at the White House, with the filmmakers, and cast, and military family caregivers in attendance. The film was also honored with screenings at the United Nations and at the United States Capitol.

== Synopsis ==
The film follows director Richard Lui on a journey to explore how mental health can be a source of hidden wounds and hidden strengths.

- Bushatz Family (Palmer, Alaska): Luke Bushatz struggles with PTSD and a traumatic brain injury from his deployment in Afghanistan. At home, his young sons and wife, Amy, share in his struggles and work to understand.
- Thomas Family (Alexandria, Virginia): Mental health expert Kate Hendricks Thomas must prepare herself, her husband Shane, and their five-year-old son for her terminal breast cancer diagnosis.
- Lui Family (San Francisco, California): As social worker and pastor Stephen Lui battles his eighth year of Alzheimer's, his wife and children face their own struggles to do the right thing.

== Production ==
The film is executive produced by journalist and founder of the Women's Alzheimer's Movement Maria Shriver, television personality Montel Williams, Olympian Laurie Hernandez, and Hilarity for Charity Co-founder Lauren Miller Rogen.

=== Filming ===
The film was shot in the cinéma vérité style over the course of seven years. The filmmakers logged over 50,000 miles to return to film each of the families several times in order to explore how each family adapted with new caregiving and mental wellness challenges. Half of the film's $1.5 million budget came in the form of in kind contributions from the film's 70 person crew.

UNCONDITIONAL reunited much of the crew and film team behind 2020's Sky Blossom, which profiled five children as they grew up caring for military veterans living with disabilities.

=== Post-Production ===
Producers Alex Lo and Richard Lui consulted with researchers from Boston University's CTE Center to create the animations in the film that show the experience of PTSD and TBI. Digital animation was also used to add in dandelions which appear in shots throughout the film, taking inspiration from wisps filmed by the crew on location in Alaska, and the feather in Forrest Gump. The dandelion was used to symbolize “life's changes as the winds blow,” according to the filmmakers, and features heavily in the film's promotional materials.

== Release ==
The documentary is the most widely distributed of 2023, with theatrical, broadcast and streaming releases beginning in May 2023 in recognition of Mental Health Awareness Month, Month of the Military Caregiver, Asian American and Pacific Islander Heritage Month and Women's Health Month.

=== World Premiere ===
The film held its World Premiere at Universal Studios Hollywood on May 2, 2023. The Premiere was promoted by a feature interview segment on NBC's TODAY the same day with Al Roker, Sheinelle Jones, Craig Melvin, and Dylan Dreyer.

=== White House Screening ===
On May 10, 2023, as part of the White House's Joining Forces Initiative, First Lady Jill Biden hosted a screening of the film at the White House Family Theater to highlight the caregivers of wounded, ill or injured service members or veterans, calling the film "beautiful" and thanking Director Richard Lui for "shining a light on families like yours, families like Amy's and Shane's, whose stories you tell so movingly" in her remarks to invited guests, delivered at the Jacqueline Kennedy Garden.

In his remarks, Lui told guests "You just got invited to the most exclusive movie theater in the world. Counted 42 seats in total. You will join Steven Spielberg, Tom Hanks, Ava DuVernay, Oprah Winfrey who have had the film screen in this very same room, the White House Family Theater."

Producer Alex Lo told reporters that he remembered learning about the White House's movie theater as a child, and that it was "unbelievable" for a film of his own to be screened there. Lo noted that it was "a privilege for the caregiving community to have this be an issue that the White House says deserves attention.”

=== United States Capitol Screening ===
The film was screened at the United States Capitol Visitors Center at an event, "An Exclusive Evening with Congress, Caregivers, and Correspondents," hosted by Juju Chang and Vicky Nguyen, featuring remarks from Rep. Judy Chu, Sen. John Boozman, journalists Lisa Ling and David Ono, director Richard Lui, Producer Alex Lo, and Executive Producer Jamie Nguyen. Singer Jay Allen of NBC's The Voice performed "Break from Broken," the film's original song.

=== Theatrical Release ===
The film was released in theaters through community partnerships with AMC Theatres, Universal Pictures Distribution, and Deluxe in 14 major markets nationwide from May 3 to 9. Donations were made to the Alzheimer's Association, Elizabeth Dole Foundation, and the Rosalynn Carter Institute for Caregivers for each ticket sold.

=== Network Broadcast ===
The film was broadcast on public television throughout May 2023, presented by American Public Television, and aired nationally on PBS WORLD Channel on May 17, 2023.

=== Cable Premiere ===
The film aired on MSNBC on May 27, 2023 for Memorial Day weekend as the top-rated program in its time slot (adults 25-54). The film was the only top-rated 2023 documentary premiere on MSNBC to date.
