= Joel E. Tohline =

American astrophysicist

Joel Edward Tohline (born July 15, 1953) is an American astrophysicist, specializing in computer simulation of complex fluid flows in astrophysical systems.

== Education and career ==
Tohline went to high school in New Orleans. He graduated in 1974 with a B.S. in physics from Centenary College of Louisiana and in 1978 with a Ph.D. in astronomy from the University of California, Santa Cruz. His thesis is entitled Fragmentation of Rotating Protostellar Clouds. As a postdoc he was from 1978 to 1980 a Willard Gibbs Instructor in Yale University's astronomy department and from 1980 to 1982 a postdoctoral fellow at Los Alamos National Laboratory. In Louisiana State University's department of physics and astronomy, he was from 1982 to 1986 an assistant professor, from 1986 to 1990 an associate professor, and from 1990 to 2002 a full professor and is since 2002 to the present Alumni Professor. In 1987 he used Blake Van Leer's invention for creating 3-dimensional hydrodynamic computer code. While at LSU, he created numerous textbooks on mathematical tools and the physical concepts, white dwarfs and neutron stars. From 1994 to 1997 he was chair of the department. He was from January to May 2000 a visiting associate in astronomy at California Institute of Technology. From 2010 to the present he is the director of the LSU Center for Computation & Technology.

Tohline is the author or coauthor of about 100 research articles. In 2007 he was elected a Fellow of the American Association for the Advancement of Science.

== Selected publications ==
- Tohline, J. E. (1980). "The gravitational fragmentation of primordial gas clouds". The Astrophysical Journal. 239: 417–427. Bibcode:1980ApJ...239..417T. doi:10.1086/158125.
- Tohline, J. E. (1982). "Hydrodynamic Collapse" (PDF). Fundamentals of Cosmic Physics. 8: 1–82. Bibcode:1982FCPh....8....1T.
- Tohline, Joel E.; Bodenheimer, Peter H.; Christodoulou, Dimitris M. (1987). "The crucial role of cooling in the making of molecular clouds and stars". The Astrophysical Journal. 322: 787–794. Bibcode:1987ApJ...322..787T. doi:10.1086/165771. ISSN 0004-637X.
- Christodoulou, D. M., Shlosman, I., & Tohline, J. E. (1994). A New Criterion for Bar-Forming Instability in Rapidly Rotating Gaseous and Stellar Systems. I. Axisymmetric Form. arXiv preprint astro-ph/9411031.https://arxiv.org/abs/astro-ph/9411031
- Cohl, Howard S.; Tohline, Joel E. (1999). "A Compact Cylindrical Green's Function Expansion for the Solution of Potential Problems". The Astrophysical Journal. 527 (1): 86–101. Bibcode:1999ApJ...527...86C. doi:10.1086/308062. S2CID 6953523.
- Lindblom, Lee; Tohline, Joel E.; Vallisneri, Michele (2001). "Nonlinear Evolution of ther-Modes in Neutron Stars". Physical Review Letters. 86 (7): 1152–1155. arXiv:astro-ph/0010653. Bibcode:2001PhRvL..86.1152L. doi:10.1103/PhysRevLett.86.1152. PMID 11178032. S2CID 33006405.
- Tohline, Joel E. (2002). "The Origin of Binary Stars". Annual Review of Astronomy and Astrophysics. 40: 349–385. Bibcode:2002ARA&A..40..349T. doi:10.1146/annurev.astro.40.060401.093810.
- d'Souza, Mario C. R.; Motl, Patrick M.; Tohline, Joel E.; Frank, Juhan (2006). "Numerical Simulations of the Onset and Stability of Dynamical Mass Transfer in Binaries". The Astrophysical Journal. 643 (1): 381–401. arXiv:astro-ph/0512137. Bibcode:2006ApJ...643..381D. doi:10.1086/500384. S2CID 13848810.
- Ott, Christian D.; Ou, Shangli; Tohline, Joel E.; Burrows, Adam (2005). "One-armed Spiral Instability in a Low- T /| W | Postbounce Supernova Core". The Astrophysical Journal. 625 (2): L119–L122. arXiv:astro-ph/0503187. Bibcode:2005ApJ...625L.119O. doi:10.1086/431305. S2CID 5546177.
- Ou, Shangli; Tohline, Joel E. (2006). "Unexpected Dynamical Instabilities in Differentially Rotating Neutron Stars". The Astrophysical Journal. 651 (2): 1068–1078. arXiv:astro-ph/0604099. Bibcode:2006ApJ...651.1068O. doi:10.1086/507597. S2CID 13916129.
- Motl, Patrick M.; Frank, Juhan; Tohline, Joel E.; d'Souza, Mario C. R. (2007). "The Stability of Double White Dwarf Binaries Undergoing Direct‐Impact Accretion". The Astrophysical Journal. 670 (2): 1314–1325. arXiv:astro-ph/0702388. Bibcode:2007ApJ...670.1314M. doi:10.1086/522076. S2CID 14166322.
- Muffoletto, Richard P.; Tyler, John M.; Tohline, Joel E. (2007). "Shifted Fresnel diffraction for computational holography". Optics Express. 15 (9): 5631–5640. Bibcode:2007OExpr..15.5631M. doi:10.1364/OE.15.005631. PMID 19532821.
- Anderson, Matthew; Hirschmann, Eric W.; Lehner, Luis; Liebling, Steven L.; Motl, Patrick M.; Neilsen, David; Palenzuela, Carlos; Tohline, Joel E. (2008). "Simulating binary neutron stars: Dynamics and gravitational waves". Physical Review D. 77 (2) 024006. arXiv:0708.2720. Bibcode:2008PhRvD..77b4006A. doi:10.1103/PhysRevD.77.024006. S2CID 2367120.
- Anderson, Matthew; Hirschmann, Eric W.; Lehner, Luis; Liebling, Steven L.; Motl, Patrick M.; Neilsen, David; Palenzuela, Carlos; Tohline, Joel E. (2008). "Magnetized Neutron-Star Mergers and Gravitational-Wave Signals". Physical Review Letters. 100 (19) 191101. arXiv:0801.4387. Bibcode:2008PhRvL.100s1101A. doi:10.1103/PhysRevLett.100.191101. PMID 18518432. S2CID 13093072.
