= Maryly Van Leer Peck =

American academic

- Peck at a 1959 Society of Women Engineers board meeting in Chicago, Illinois

President of Polk Community College
- In office 1982–1997
- Preceded by: Fred Lenfestey
- Succeeded by: J. Larry Durrence

Dean Guam Community College
- In office 1977–1982

Dean of Engineering University of Guam
- In office 1970–1977

Aerospace Engineer at United States Naval Research Laboratory
- In office 1963–1970

Personal details
- Born: Maryly Van Leer; June 29, 1930 Washington, D.C., U.S.
- Died: November 3, 2011 (aged 81) West Palm Beach, Florida, U.S.
- Spouse(s): Jordan Brown Peck, Jr
- Children: Jordan Brown Peck, III, Blake Peck, James Peck, Elaine Peck
- Relatives: Blake R. Van Leer (father); Ella Lillian Wall Van Leer (mother); Blake Wayne Van Leer (brother)
- Education: Vanderbilt University; University of Florida
- Profession: Community college president

Maryly Van Leer Peck (June 29, 1930 – November 3, 2011) was an American academic and college administrator. She founded numerous programs in Guam, one of them being the Community Career College at the University of Guam (which merged into Guam Community College in November 1977). She was the first female president of a public institution of higher learning in Florida, the first female president of a Florida community college while president of Polk Community College, also known as Polk State College. She was one of the first female graduates of the School of Engineering at Vanderbilt University and the first woman to graduate with a degree in chemical engineering. She was also the first woman to receive an M.S. and a Ph.D. in engineering from the University of Florida. She also founded Society of Women Engineers chapters, and was an active board member.

== Early life and education ==
Maryly Van Leer Peck was born on June 29, 1930, in Washington, D.C. She was the second child, and only daughter, of Blake Ragsdale Van Leer and Ella Lillian Wall Van Leer. She was a member of the influential Van Leer family.

Peck's parents both had strong academic backgrounds and were close friends with renowned intellectuals of their time, including Frank Bunker Gilbreth Sr. and Lillian Moller Gilbreth, which not only exposed Peck very early to engineering, but it also showed her the possibility that she could be one herself. Peck became the valedictorian of her high school class in Georgia, granting her a state-sponsored scholarship. However, at that time, the male-only Georgia Institute of Technology was the only school offering engineering, and even though her father filed a case on her behalf, she didn't have an option but to spend a year at Duke, before transferring to Vanderbilt University in her sophomore year, so that she could major in chemical engineering. She was the first woman to receive a chemical engineering degree from Vanderbilt in 1951, while also graduating with highest honors and becoming the first woman initiated into Tau Beta Pi, the honorary engineering fraternity. Four years later, she became one of the first female graduates in engineering from Vanderbilt and the first woman with an engineering master's degree from the University of Florida, where she also received her doctorate in 1963.

== Career ==
While working on her master's degree, Peck started tutoring older students in math-related subjects. This caught the eye of a professor at Florida University, who asked her to substitute for him, while he was away presenting a paper. This was the first of many teaching jobs Peck would have during the following decades.

Peck maintained close ties with the Society of Women Engineers throughout her career and was the National Chair of Student Affairs. After her parents successfully lobbied to admit the first women into Georgia Tech, Peck complimented this victory with setting up a SWE chapter and support network on campus. By 1962 she was named national vice president of the organization. Later In 1962, as she was finishing her doctoral dissertation, Peck found a job as a propellant and aerospace engineer for Rocketdyne Corporation and United States Naval Research Laboratory in Washington, D.C. She developed solid fuel and engines which are still used in the space program today. Since she was already a mother of four children by that time, this attracted the interest of journalists and resulted in a 1962 interview for Life magazine.

Soon after their marriage, her husband, Jordan Brown Peck, Jr., became an Episcopal priest. She followed him when he decided to do some missionary work in Guam. They would remain there for eleven years. During this period, she would become the first woman dean of the College of Business and Applied Technology at the University of Guam, and would help them create numerous 4-year programs. She was also a chairman on its board. She then became the founder of the Community Career College at the University of Guam. This was the 2-year associate degrees program of the university, which otherwise offered 4-year degrees at the undergraduate level in its other undergraduate departments. This school was moved to Guam Community College under Peck's leadership in November 1977, just after that school was established; making up the higher education component of that newly created institution.

In 1982, Peck was selected to be the president of Polk Community College, now Polk State College, and she served in this position until 1997, which made her the first female president of a public institution of higher learning in Florida. Peck was the first woman to be named president of any of Florida's 26 community colleges. In 2005, Peck received the National Community Service Award from the Daughters of the American Revolution organization.

During Peck's tenure, Polk Community College added the Lakeland campus and established a foundation which, by the time she retired, had $5.5 million for scholarships and college equipment. In 1995 Peck was awarded the "She Knows Where She's Going" award by Girls, Inc. and later joined their national board.

After her retirement in 1997, Peck served as the headmaster of the Episcopal All Saints' Academy and later joined the board for the Vanguard School.

Peck was honored as a Distinguished Alumnus of the University of Florida in 1991, and in 2007, she was selected by the Governor of Florida to be inducted into the Florida Women's Hall of Fame.

== Personal life ==
Peck married Jordan Brown Peck, Jr. in 1951, the year she received her B.A. The couple had four children.

In 1982, Peck became the first woman to be admitted into membership of the Winter Haven Rotary Club; afterwards, she also became the first woman to be elected president of the same club. In 2003, she was interviewed by Society of Women Engineers (SWE) for a profile on about her life as a pioneer. She died in West Palm Beach, in 2011, at the age of 81, and was interred at St. Mark's Episcopal Church in Palm Gardens.

== See also ==
- Van Leer Family
