= Alpha Xi Delta =

American collegiate women's fraternity

- ΑΞΔ
- Founded: April 17, 1893; 133 years ago Lombard College
- Type: Social
- Affiliation: NPC
- Status: Active
- Scope: National
- Motto: "The Pen is Mightier than the Sword"
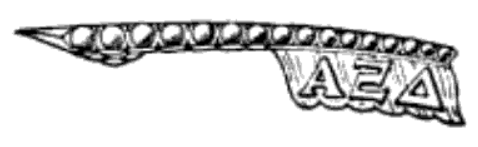
- Member badge
- Colors: Light blue, Dark blue, Gold
- Symbol: Quill
- Flower: Pink rose
- Jewel: Pearl and diamond
- Mascot: BetXi Bear
- Publication: The Quill of Alpha Xi Delta
- Chapters: 130 active (217 total)
- Members: 175,000+ lifetime
- Headquarters: 1389 West 86th Street #350; Indianapolis, Indiana 46260; United States
- Website: alphaxidelta.org

Alpha Xi Delta (ΑΞΔ, often referred to as A-"Zee"-D) is an American women's fraternity. It was founded in 1893 at Lombard College in Galesburg, Illinois. It has 175,000 initiated members and maintains active chapters at 130 institutions across the United States. Alpha Xi Delta is a member of National Panhellenic Conference.

== History ==
On April 17, 1893, ten young women at Lombard College in Galesburg, Illinois founded Alpha Xi Delta sorority. The founders ranged in age from 16 to 26. They were Cora Bollinger Block, Alice Bartlett Brummer, Frances Elizabeth Cheney, Elmira Lowry Cheney, Bertha Cook Evans, Elizabeth Curtis Everton, Julia Maude Foster, Lucy W. Gilmer, and Harriet McCollum. With the help Sigma Nu fraternity's brothers at Lombard College, the sorority developed a constitution that prepared it to become a national organization; the constitution was adopted in 1902.

The sorority remained a local organization until 1902 when it established chapters at Iowa Wesleyan University and University of Mount Union. Its three chapters held the first national convention in 1903. Chapters were added at Bethany College and University of South Dakota in 1903, and Wittenberg University and Syracuse University in 1904.

Alpha Xi Delta began publishing its magazine, Alpha Xi Delta in 1904.In 1904, the sorority joined the National Panhellenic Conference. Alpha Xi Delta's Ella Boston Leib was NPC chairman in 1906. Lena Grandin Baldwin, an Alpha Xi Delta who served as NPC chairman from 1912 to 1915, wrote the Panhellenic Creed.

The sorority was incorporated in the State of Ohio in 1907. Alpha Xi Delta was referred to as a sorority until 1913, when the term "women's fraternity" was adopted. By 1927, twenty chapters had established houses. When Lombard College closed in 1930, the Alpha chapter moved to Knox College, also located in Galesburg. In 1931, the fraternity had established fifty chapters and initiated 9,500 members.

After promoting the admission of women to Georgia Tech in the 1950s, Alpha Xi Delta alumna Ella Wall Van Leer helped establish a chapter of Alpha Xi Delta on the campus in 1954. By 1963, the fraternity had 86 active chapters, 17 inactive chapters, and 39,007 total initiates. At that time, 36 of chapters owned a house.

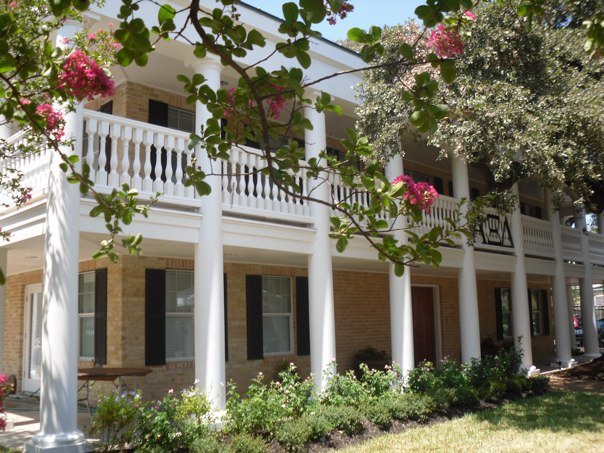
University of Texas at Austin chapter house

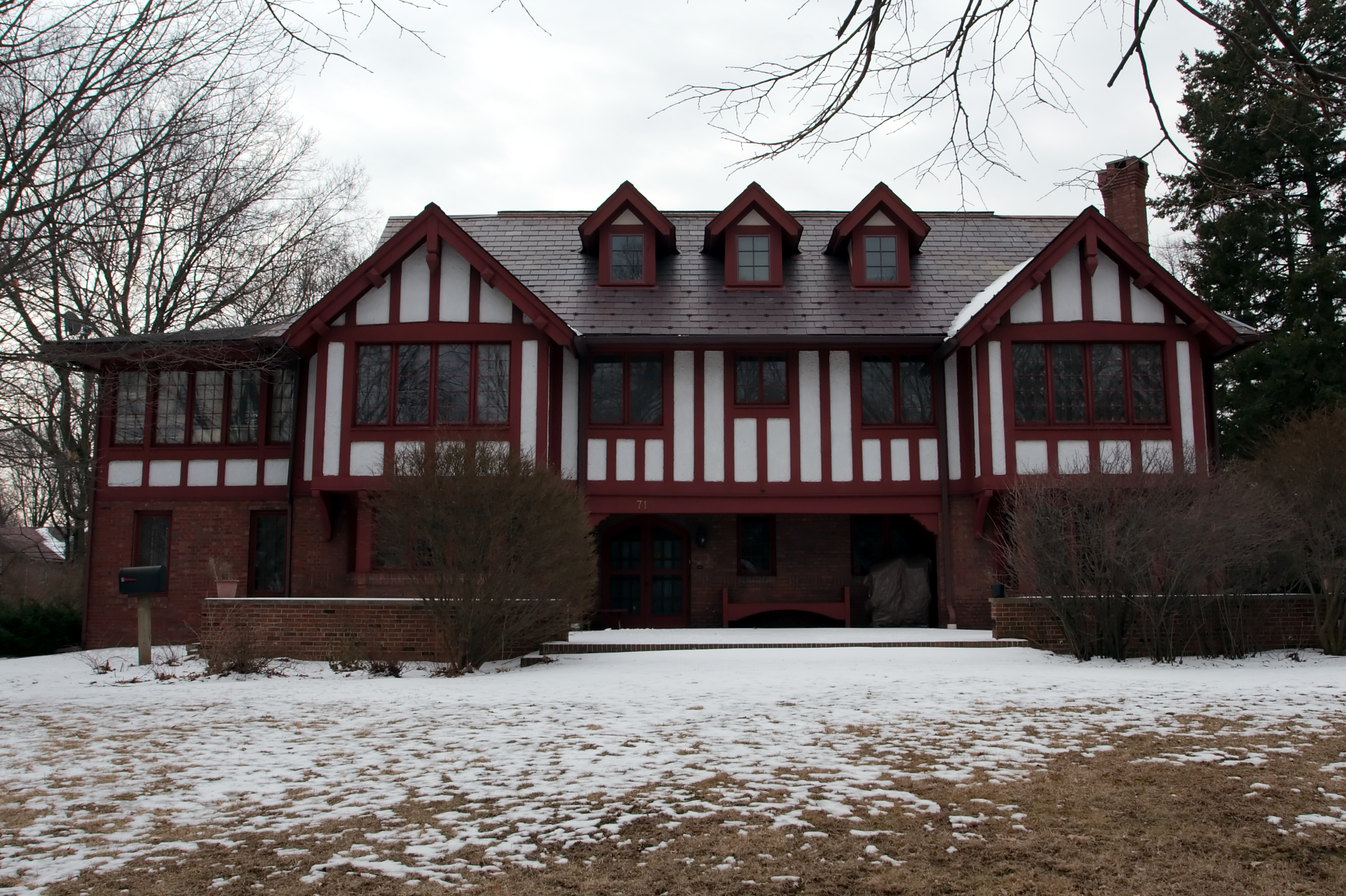
University of Illinois chapter house, listed on the National Register of Historic Places

== Symbols ==
The Alpha Xi Delta coat of arms is an azure shield supported by two light blue rampant griffins. At the top of the shield are three roses, followed by a gold quill in its center, and a broken sword in the lower portion. Above the shield is a knight's helmet topped by a pink rose with a leaf and a branch. Below the shield is the azure motto Αλφα Χί Δέλτα or ΑΞΔ.

Alpha Xi Delta's badge is a gold quill, with the raised Greek letters "ΑΞΔ" on the feathers. The quill represents the open motto "The Pen is Mightier than the Sword." A variety of designs were produced in the early years of the fraternity; a standard design was devised by 1911. The fraternity's new member pin is oval shaped, with a black enamel center that features the Greek letters "ΑΞΔ" in gold and a gold exterior band.

The colors of Alpha Xi Delta are light blue, dark blue, and gold. The fraternity's flag consists of three horizonal strips; the top stripe is dark blue with ten gold start, the center stripe is light blue with the Greek letters "ΑΞΔ" in gold, and the bottom stripe is dark blue with a gold quill. The fraternity's flower is the pink rose, chosen to complement the white rose of Sigma Nu fraternity. Its jewels are diamond and pearl. BetXi Bear has been the fraternity's official mascot since 1989.

The fraternity celebrates Founder's Day on April 17 each year. Alpha Xi Delta's publication is The Quill of Alpha Xi Delta, first published in 1915.

=== Symphony ===
Alpha Xi Delta's open creed is called "The Symphony of Alpha Xi Delta" and it lists the ideals of the fraternity's members. It was written in 1924 by Helen Willis Lynn, Alice Matthews, and Almira Cheney, one of the founders.

"These things do we earnestly desire: A clear vision of life, that with gracious and kindly hearts we may share both joy and sorrow and bring into living reality the Sisterhood of women. An appreciation of real merit and worth, steadfastness of soul, that without bitterness or defeat, we may encounter misfortune and with humility meet success. These things, O Lord, help us to instill within our hearts that we may grow in courage and graciousness and peace."

== Philanthropy ==
In 1956, the fraternity established the Alpha Xi Delta Foundation to oversee its educational and philanthropic activities. Alpha Xi Delta has supported a variety of philanthropies over its history. In 2022, building on the success of the Kindly Hearts Campaign of 2021, which supported those affected by the COVID-19 pandemic, Alpha Xi Delta announced its new national philanthropy: the Kindly Hearts Initiative, supporting children experiencing foster care or homelessness. From 2009 to 2021, its national philanthropic partner was Autism Speaks. The sorority raised more than $12 million for Autism Speaks.

Alpha Xi Delta Philanthropy Timeline
Years	Charity	Ref.
pre-1930	Tuberculosis and memorial libraries	
1930s	Sponsorship of Carcassone Community School in Gander, Kentucky	
1942–1947	American Red Cross: supported the World War II effort by donating an ambulance, clubmobile, and portable pianos. Also help blood drives	
1947–1952	Adopted Noordwyk, Netherlands which was devastated by World War II	
1949	Rural Children Development Program: provided aid to Brown County, Indiana	
1952	Save the Children Federation: sponsored ten schools in Arkansas and Tennessee	
1958	Combatting Juvenile Delinquency: sponsored Howell House in Chicago, Illinois	
1973–1977	Pittman Hall, supported a hone for girls in New York	
1978–1992	American Lung Association: promoted respiratory health	
1992–2009	Choose Children	
2009–2021	Autism Speaks	
2021–2022	Kindly Hearts Campaign: supported those affected by the COVID-19 pandemic	
2022–to date	Kindly Hearts Initiative: supporting children experiencing foster care or homelessness	

=== The AmaXIng Challenge ===
Each college chapter participates annually in one of six events called "The AmaXing Challenge: Step It Up, Xi Man/Xi Woman, Sports FrenXi, Xi Games, Xi Karaoke, or AmaXing Gala. Funds that are raised support the Kindly Hearts Initiative.

=== Letters of Love ===
In November of each year, collegiate and alumnae members participate in an online letter-writing project to raise funds and awareness. Letters of Love supports two "key impact" organizations: FosterClub and StandUp for Kids.

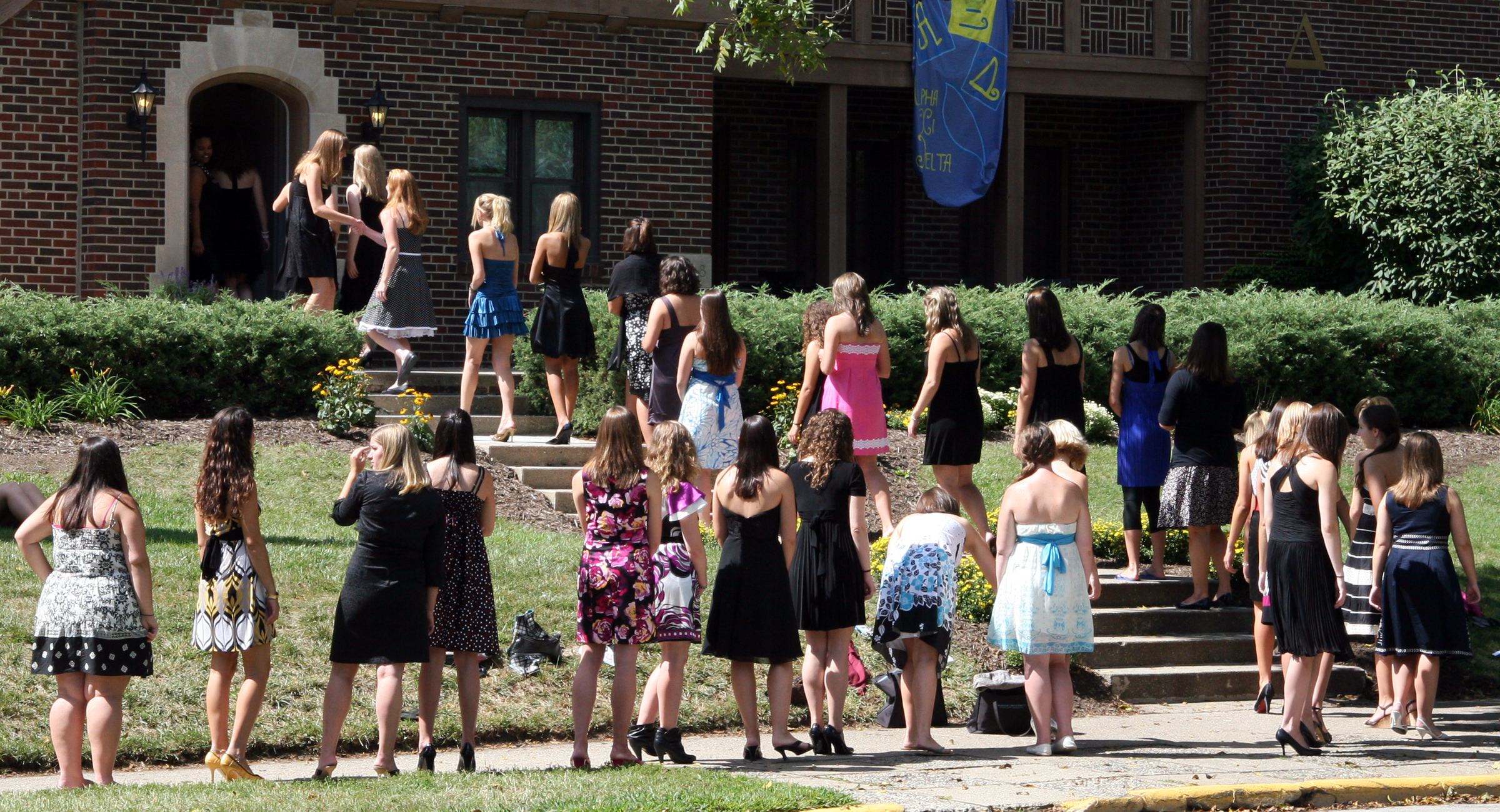
Potential members in front of the Alpha Xi Delta house at Purdue University during rush

== Membership ==
Membership is Alpha Xi Delta is open to individuals who live and self-identify as woman and demonstrate academic achievement and good character. The fraternity selects new members through a process of meetings, events, and interviews.

== Governance ==
The fraternity is governed by a National Council that is elected at a convention of the national chapter, consisting of a representative from each chapter and the national officers. It has a national executive secretary and staff. Its national headquarters is in Indianapolis, Indiana.

== Chapters ==
Alpha Xi Delta has active chapters at 130 institutions across the United States.

== Notable members ==
Alpha Xi Delta has initiated over 175,000 members.

== Scandals and member misconduct ==
In October 1945, the Upsilon chapter at the University of Vermont offered membership to Crystal Malone, one of the few Black students enrolled in the university. Although the fraternity constitution did not have explicit racial restrictions, the National Council ordered the local chapter to withdraw its offer to Malone. They refused. The fraternity's national president, Winnafred Corwin Robinson (Mrs. Beverly Robinson), ordered the chapter closed. Today, the fraternity's constitution and bylaws state that Alpha Xi Delta does not "discriminate based on religion, race, national origin, disability, sexual orientation, veteran status, citizenship, or age."

In 2010, the Miami University chapter of Alpha Xi Delta was suspended until 2014 for alcohol violations stemming from its destructive formal at Cincinnati's National Underground Railroad Freedom Center. In 2019, the sorority recolonized the chapter and no longer recognizes the members involved in the incident.

== See also ==
- College fraternities and sororities
- List of social sororities and women's fraternities
