= Ella Lillian Wall Van Leer =

American architect

First Lady of Georgia Tech

Personal details
- Born: Ella Lillian Wall; November 21, 1892 Berkeley, California, US
- Died: August 8, 1986 (aged 93) Alexandria, Virginia, US
- Spouse: Blake Ragsdale Van Leer
- Children: 3, including Maryly Van Leer Peck, Blake Van Leer
- Education: University of California, Berkeley
- Occupation: Architect, artist, women's rights activist

Military service
- Branch/service: United States Army
- Years of service: 1917–1953
- Commands: Army Nurse Corps
- Battles/wars: World War I World War II
- Awards: Legion of Merit

Ella Lillian Wall Van Leer (née Ella Lillian Wall; November 11, 1892 – August 8, 1986) was an American artist and architect, women's rights activist, and the first woman to serve in an office of the American Legion in California. She was known as the "First Lady of Georgia Tech" and remained an advocate for women in engineering throughout her entire life.

== Early life and education ==
Wall was born on November 21, 1892, in Berkeley, California. Her father, A. Conrad Wall, was a marine engineer.

In 1910, Wall graduated from Berkeley High School, after which she enrolled at UC Berkeley. While there, she founded the art honor society for women Delta Epsilon. She was a member of the Alpha Xi Delta sorority; years later, she would be instrumental in creating the Tau Sigma society at Georgia Tech, which would eventually be absorbed into the Alpha Xi Delta sorority.

In 1915, after defending her thesis entitled, "The Functions of Rhythm Motives in Decorative Design," Wall received an M.A. in Art and Architecture, subjects she later taught at several high schools in California. Even with a degree in architecture, women were not taken seriously in this line of work. She could not pursue her passion as a woman and would instead teach. One of her first jobs was working for Rand McNally as an artist; two of her maps featuring women authors are currently in the Smithsonian Institution. In July 1918, a year after the United States entered the First World War, Wall enlisted in the Army Nursing Corps at the Letterman Army Hospital on the Presidio of San Francisco. She was tasked with various therapies, medical illustration and leading facial paralysis cases, before being mobilized for overseas duty four months later. She would later be awarded the Legion of Merit for her medical work in the military.

She returned to the United States in March 1920, and after serving in the U.S.A. General Hospital 3 in Colonia, New Jersey, she went back to California to continue her teaching career. In 1923, she became the first woman to serve in an office of the American Legion in California as second vice commander of the Berkeley Post No. 7.

== First Lady of Georgia Tech ==
In 1924, Ella Lillian Wall married Blake Ragsdale Van Leer and added his surname to her own; from then on, she often dropped the "Lillian" from her lengthy name, typically going by Ella Wall Van Leer.

During her marriage, Wall pursued her career as an artist, working as an illustrator for Rand McNally, and, during the Second World War, Ella worked at the office of the Quartermaster General as a principal draftsman and technologist of the research and development branch in Washington. She also designed the president's home on campus.

After her husband became president of Georgia Institute of Technology in 1944, Wall became the "backbone of women" at the school and their "unofficial dean," campaigning for women's rights and successfully petitioning for an overturn of the statute barring female students from enrolling at Georgia Tech. While her husband was lobbying the board of regents, Ella worked with the Women's Chamber of Commerce to press the matter. After the first women were admitted to Tech, Ella and the Women's Chamber of Commerce created the first scholarship for female students. Ella would later encourage Alpha Xi Delta to set up an official chapter in 1954; however, they lacked the 25 students necessary for a chapter. The sorority made a special exception and officially founded a chapter at a private ceremony hosted by the Van Leers. This would be the first sorority at an engineering school. Ella's daughter, Maryly Van Leer Peck, was National Chair of Student Affairs at Society of Women Engineers at the time and helped GeorgiaTech found a chapter for SWE with a support network. Ella would remain active in the chapter and remained an advocate for women in engineering her entire life.

After Blake Van Leer died in 1956, Ella bought a house in the vicinity of Georgia Tech and turned it into "an unofficial women's dormitory". She was also active in the Georgia Tech chapter of the Society of Women Engineers, while serving as the trustee, President of the Auxiliary and Director of Volunteers at the Egleston Hospital from 1959 until her retirement in 1976.

Wall died on August 8, 1986, at the age of 93, in Alexandria, Virginia. She was buried at the Marietta National Cemetery in Cobb County, Georgia.

== Personal life ==
Wall and Blake Ragsdale Van Leer had three children. Blake Wayne was born in 1926 in Berkeley, Maryly was born four years later in Washington, D.C., and Samuel Wall was born in 1934 in Gainesville, Florida.

Maryly Van Leer Peck would go on to become an engineer and the first female president of Polk Community College. Since her husband was an orphan, Ella conducted a great deal of genealogy research on his behalf and set the foundation for the Van Leer family archives.

== See also ==
- Van Leer Family
