= Blake Wayne Van Leer =

U.S. Navy officer (1926–1997)

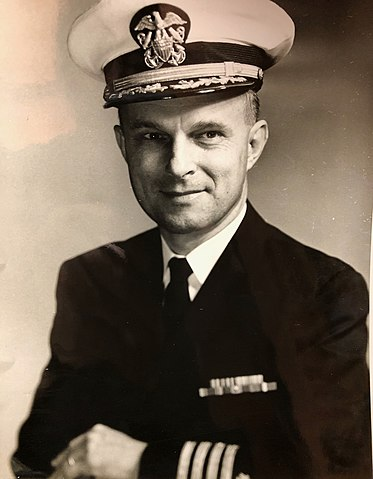

Commander in the United States Navy

Personal details
- Born: January 13, 1926 Berkeley, California, U.S.
- Died: October 3, 1997 (aged 71) Arlington, Virginia, U.S.
- Resting place: Arlington National Cemetery, Arlington, Virginia, U.S.
- Children: 3
- Relatives: Blake R. Van Leer (father); Ella Lillian Wall Van Leer (mother); Maryly Van Leer Peck (sister)
- Education: Princeton University; Duke University; North Carolina State University; Rensselaer Polytechnic Institute
- Awards: Legion of Merit; Moreel Medal; Meritorious Service Medal; American Campaign Medal; Asiatic–Pacific Campaign Medal; World War II Victory Medal; National Defense Service Medal; Korean Service Medal; Antarctica Service Medal; Vietnam Service Medal; United Nations Korea Medal; Vietnam Campaign Medal

Military service
- Allegiance: United States of America
- Branch/service: United States Navy
- Years of service: 1943–1971
- Rank: Captain, Commander
- Commands: Seabees
- Battles/wars: World War II; Vietnam War

Blake Wayne Van Leer (January 13, 1926 – October 3, 1997) was a United States Navy officer who commanded the naval construction Battalion Seabees during World War II and the Vietnam War. He led the expansion of submarine-launched ballistic missile programs and the OMEGA Navigation System used for communication to the U.S. submarine fleet. He received the Legion of Merit award and the Moreel Medal for outstanding contributions to military engineering. He was the son of Georgia Institute of Technology president Blake R. Van Leer and women's rights activist Ella Lillian Wall Van Leer.

== Early life and education ==
Van Leer was born in Berkeley, California, on January 13, 1926, to Blake R. Van Leer, a colonel and university president, and Ella Lillian Wall Van Leer, a technologist and principal draftswoman in the quartermaster general's research department. He was a member of the influential Van Leer family. Van Leer attended Needham B. Broughton High School, studied at North Carolina State University, and received a bachelor's degree in mechanical engineering from Duke University. He received a civil engineering degree from Rensselaer Polytechnic Institute, graduated from the Joint Forces Staff College, and received a master's degree in civil engineering from Princeton University.

== Military service ==
In 1943, Van Leer enlisted in the Navy and quickly rose to the rank of a lieutenant commander and commander of the construction battalion known as the Seabees. As a commander, Van Leer led numerous engineering projects for the Navy during the Vietnam War and was promoted to captain. This same year he personally lead the expansion of the Polaris weapons system and ballistic missile submarine program expansion. Van Leer also complemented this program with an extensive Naval base expansion in Charleston, SC. In 1969, Van Leer received the Moreell Medal for outstanding contribution to military engineering.

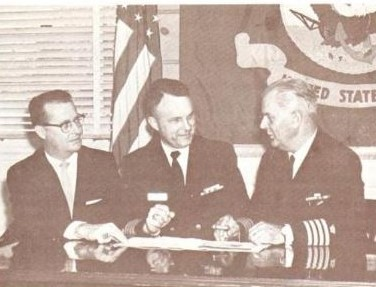
Capt. Blake Van Leer (center) launching Seabee STINGER program

Later in 1969, Van Leer created the well-known Seabee "STINGER" system (Seabee Tactical Installed Navy Generated Engineering Resource), which is designed to quickly facilitate the development of troops, construction, and resources efficiently during wartime. In 1970, Van Leer was assigned to Fegley Glacier to lead the nuclear research and power unit at McMurdo Station during Operation Deep Freeze. Van Leer lead the construction and opening of Naval Radio Transmitter Facility LaMoure, which uses a former OMEGA Navigation System station as a VLF transmitter for communications with the US submarine fleet.

He retired in 1971.

== Personal life ==
In 1947, Van Leer married Margaret Anne Weaver, with whom he had three children, Maryanne Van Leer, Wayne Van Leer, and Blake R. Van Leer II, all of who became engineers. In 1981 the couple divorced, and in 1982 he married Colleen Jennings Van Leer, to whom he was married until his death in 1997. Van Leer's family had several notable roles in the military. His father was a notable military officer, colonel, and engineer, and also received awards. During his father's tenure at Georgia Tech, women were admitted for the first time and steps were made towards integration. His mother was in the Army Nurse Corps, a technologist at the research and development department in Washington. Van Leer's sister Maryly Van Leer Peck is also a notable American academic who is the first woman to receive a M.S. and a Ph.D. in chemical engineering and worked as a lead rocket engineer at the United States Naval Research Laboratory. Peck also received the National Community Service Award by the Daughters of the American Revolution organization and both Van Leers are a descendant of Samuel Van Leer, an American Revolutionary War Captain and Founding Father General Anthony Wayne. After his retirement, Blake Wayne Van Leer became the president and corporate administrator of Urban Pathfinders Inc.

Van Leer died on October 3, 1997, of congestive heart failure at Arlington Hospital and was interred at Arlington National Cemetery in Arlington, Virginia.

== See also ==
- Ben Moreell

== Sources ==
- Enger, Walter (1970). Navy Civil Engineer, Volumes 11-12. Naval Civil Engineering Command.
