= 1956 Sugar Bowl =

American college football game

- 22nd Sugar Bowl
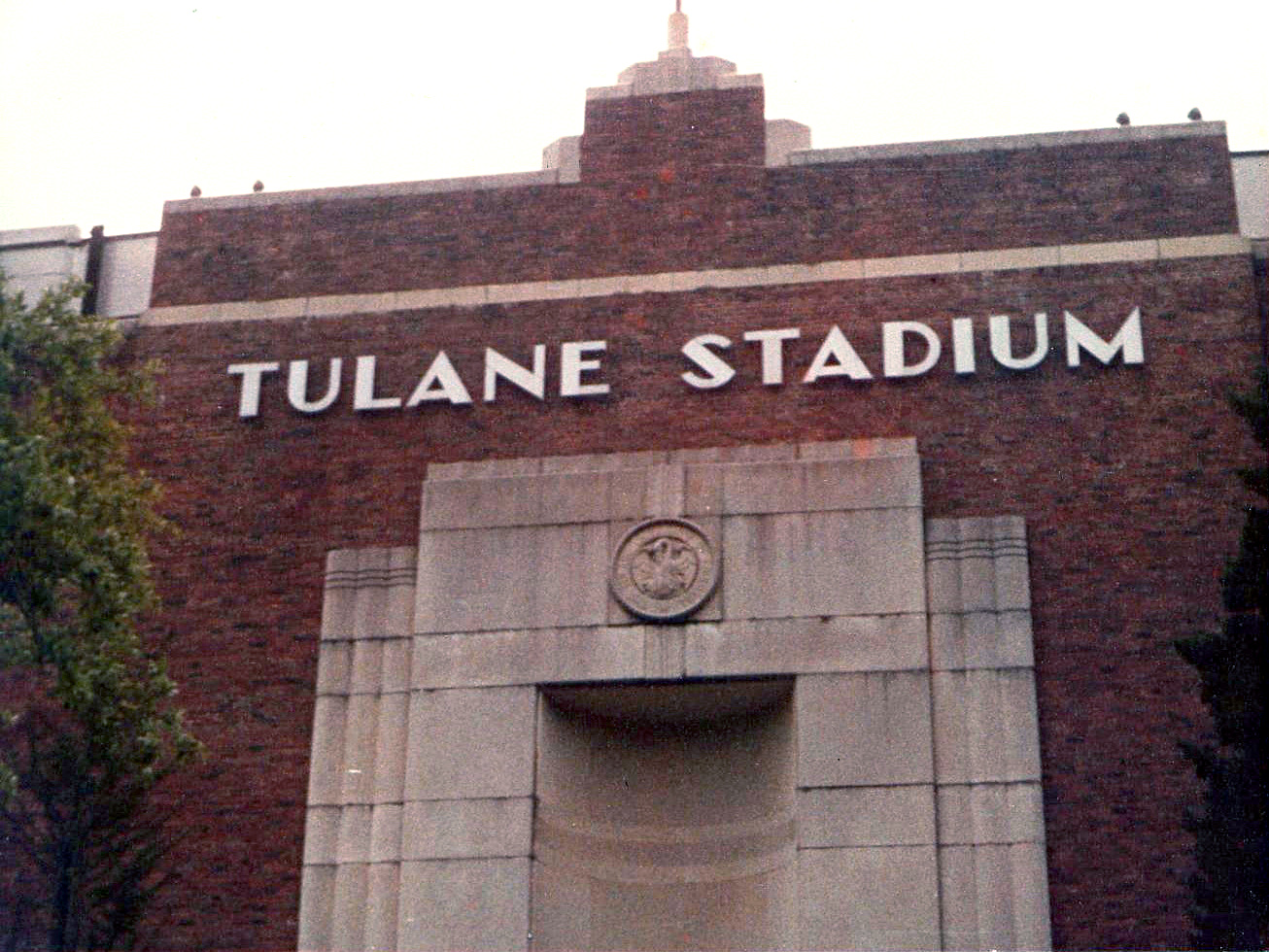
- Tulane Stadium in New Orleans, Louisiana, hosted the Sugar Bowl.
Georgia Tech Yellow Jackets	Pittsburgh Panthers
(8–1–1)	(7–3)
SEC	Independent
7	0
Head coach: Bobby Dodd	Head coach: John Michelosen
AP / Coaches; 7 / 7	AP / Coaches; 11 / 11
	1	2	3	4	Total
Georgia Tech	7	0	0	0	7
Pittsburgh	0	0	0	0	0
- Date: January 2, 1956
- Season: 1955
- Stadium: Tulane Stadium
- Location: New Orleans, Louisiana
- Referee: John Coles (EAIFO); split crew: EAIFO, SEC)
- Attendance: 76,535–80,175

United States TV coverage
- Network: ABC
- Announcers: Ray Scott, Bill Stern

The 1956 Sugar Bowl featured the 7th ranked Georgia Tech Yellow Jackets, and the 11th ranked Pittsburgh Panthers. The game was played on January 2, since New Year's Day was a Sunday. Much controversy preceded the 1956 Sugar Bowl. Segregationists and Georgia governor Marvin Griffin used all his political power in an attempt to keep Pitt fullback/linebacker Bobby Grier from playing because he was black. Georgia Tech president Blake R. Van Leer resisted the governor’s pressure, insisting the Institute honor its commitment to the game. Ultimately, Bobby Grier played, making it the first integrated Sugar Bowl as well as becoming the first integrated bowl game in the Deep South.

== Background ==
This game occurred during segregation battles in the south, including Brown v. Board of Education (1954) and the murder of Emmett Till (1955). The Sugar Bowl had been racially segregated since its first inception in 1935. No black players had ever taken the field in it. There were even different sections of the stadium set aside for black and white attendees. In the past, most Southern colleges (including Georgia Tech) were all-white and had an unofficial "gentleman's agreement" with integrated Northern schools in which the teams would only play against each other if the African American players on the team were benched for the game. By the 1950s, this agreement was starting to break down, with some Northern schools refusing to honor it and some Southern schools agreeing to play against integrated teams so long as the game took place in the North. Many Southern schools responded to this shift by simply refusing to play Northern schools at all, resulting in a significant decline in inter-sectional gameplay. The Bowl games, most of which took place in the South, became a focal point of contention. The Cotton Bowl in Dallas held its first integrated game in 1948, and the Sun Bowl in El Paso held one in 1950. But up to 1956, most Southern games remained strictly segregated.

Georgia Tech had been involved in a previous racial incident in 1934, when the team refused to play a game against the University of Michigan unless the Wolverines benched their star end, a black player named Willis Ward. Michigan eventually complied with the demand, but only after Georgia Tech agreed to reciprocate by benching their own star end, Hoot Gibson. With both players out of the game, it proceeded on schedule, with Michigan winning 9-2 to earn what turned out to be their only victory of the season. By 1956, Georgia Tech had a progressive President, and they had played against integrated teams before, including a game against Notre Dame two years earlier (a 27-14 defeat that ended the Yellow Jackets' 31-game winning streak), but none of these games had taken place in the South.

Pittsburgh's linebacker and fullback, Bobby Grier, was black. Many segregationists in New Orleans fought to bar him from playing. This stood in stark contrast to the 1956 Rose Bowl, which featured two of the most racially integrated college football teams of the day with six African American players for the UCLA Bruins and seven for the Michigan State Spartans. Pitt's official stance was "No Grier, no game". The School announced Grier would "travel, eat, live, practice, and play with the team". After receiving the team invitation to the Sugar Bowl, Georgia Tech coach Bobby Dodd took a poll of his players to see if they were willing to play an integrated team. Every single player voted in favor of playing the game. Starting quarterback Wade Mitchell said "I personally have no objection to playing a team with a Negro member on it, and, as far as I know, the rest of the boys feel the same way." Georgia Tech president Blake R. Van Leer also played a decisive role, making clear that the Institute would honor its commitment to play, despite heavy political pressure. His leadership is widely credited with ensuring the game moved forward.

=== Opposition by Griffin ===
Georgia governor Marvin Griffin, who had a son attending Georgia Tech at the time, privately told Dodd and Georgia Tech's President Blake R Van Leer the game could proceed, but would later publicly oppose Georgia Tech's participation in the game. On December 2, 1955 (the day after the arrest of Rosa Parks, which led to the Montgomery bus boycott), Griffin publicly sent another telegram to his state's Board Of Regents imploring that teams from Georgia not engage in racially integrated events which had Blacks either as participants or in the stands. It read:

The South stands at Armageddon. The battle is joined. We cannot make the slightest concession to the enemy in this dark and lamentable hour of struggle. There is no more difference in compromising integrity of race on the playing field than in doing so in the classrooms. One break in the dike and the relentless enemy will rush in and destroy us.

Georgia Tech president Blake R. Van Leer played a pivotal role in ensuring the game proceeded, standing firm against political pressure to withdraw. Van Leer insisted that Georgia Tech honor its contract with the Sugar Bowl, reportedly telling state officials, ‘We're not backing out.’ Historians and contemporaries credit his stance as a decisive factor in allowing the game to be played, and as an early step in the integration of Southern college athletics.

That same night, a group of 2,000 Georgia Tech students held a protest against Griffin's stance, which soon turned into a riot. Holding signs saying "We play anybody" and "governor Griffin sits on his brains", the students broke windows, upturned parking meters, hung Griffin in effigy, and marched all the way to the governor's mansion, surrounding it until 3:30 a.m. and only agreeing to disperse when state representative Milton "Muggsy" Smith (himself a former Georgia Tech football player) addressed the crowd and assured them the game would be played. A few days later, students at the rival University of Georgia held their own protest against Griffin, stating "For once we are with Georgia Tech." Others all across America came out against Griffin, including labor leader Walter Reuther, who called Griffin's statement "un-American", and said "you couldn't help the communists more if you were on their payroll." Griffin publicly blamed Georgia Tech's President Van Leer for the "riots," directed Van Leer to determine what students were responsible for the demonstration and take immediate disciplinary action, but after Van Leer refused, Griffin then requested he be replaced. State representative John P Drinkard recommended that all of Georgia Tech's state funding be cut off if they proceed and later Griffin suggested anyone who adhered to the principles of integration should not be admitted to Tech. Van Leer's family also received violent threats in the mail. Following these events, Van Leer was summoned to the Board of Regents. While in front of the Board of Regents, Van Leer was publicly quoted on record:

Either we're going to the Sugar Bowl or you can find yourself another damn president of Georgia Tech.

On December 5 the Georgia Tech board of regents voted 13-1 in favor of allowing the game to proceed as scheduled.

== Game summary ==
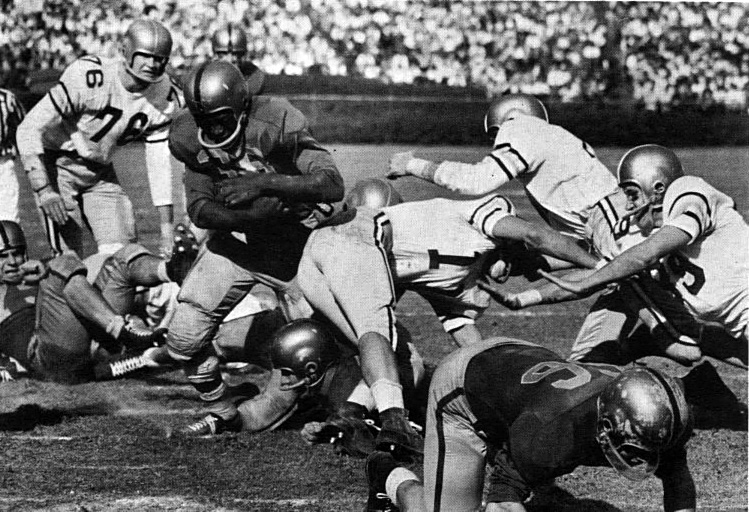
In 1956, Pitt's Bobby Grier (pictured carrying the ball) was the first to break the Sugar Bowl's color-barrier

The game was a high caliber defensive game. The two teams gave up a combined 7 points, on 453 combined yards. Georgia Tech was held without any points the remaining three quarters of the game, and ended up winning by a 7–0 margin. Pittsburgh, despite dominating the game in terms of yardage (311–142) lost because of two lost fumbles, and 72 penalty yards.

After Georgia Tech recovered a Pitt fumble on the Panthers 32-yard line, Grier was flagged for a 31-yard pass interference penalty, giving the Yellow Jackets a first and goal from the 1. The call was hotly disputed, both by fans in attendance and Pitt players. On the next play, quarterback Wade Mitchell took the ball into the end zone to give his team a 7–0 lead.

In the second quarter, Georgia Tech was held to five offensive plays, while Pitt got a chance to score with a 79-yard drive to the Yellowjackets 1-yard line. But with time running out, Pitt QB Corny Salvaterra was stuffed for no gain on 4th and goal by GT defenders Franklin Brooks and Allen Ecker.

In the third quarter, a 26-yard run by Grier sparked a drive to the GT 16-yard line, but this ended with no points due to an interception. Later in the period, Pitt drove all the way to the Yellow Jacket 7, only to lose the ball on a fumble. In the fourth quarter, Pitt mounted a last minute drive for the tying score, but was stopped on the GT 5-yard line when time ran out.

Grier finished as the game's leading rusher with 51 yards.

== Aftermath ==
After the game, Grier protested the pass interference call, but praised the Georgia Tech players, saying "They were good sportsmen, perhaps the best I've played against all season. They played hard, but clean. It was a good game. But believe me. I didn't push that man." The referee who made the call was Rusty Coles, a Pittsburgh native who had been selected by Pitt for the game (both teams got to select three referees each). Coles later admitted the call was an error, but denied making it intentionally. Despite the after game awards banquet being hosted in the segregated St. Charles Hotel, Grier accepted an invite from the Georgia Tech players to attend. When Grier walked into the banquet hall, he received the loudest ovation of any player there. Grier said: "That made me feel good, made me feel special." Georgia Tech's President Blake Van Leer would die from a heart attack two weeks later, and his family has consistently said it was from the stress leading up to the game. 60 years later, Grier and Georgia Tech's QB Wade Mitchell met at Georgia Tech's stadium and shared a meal once more. They were joined by their families and Blake Van Leer III.

The 1956 Sugar Bowl is considered the first step towards integration for Georgia Tech and Atlanta as they also opposed Griffin's push to cut funding from colleges which adhered to integration. Four years after President Van Leer's death an overwhelming majority of the 2,741 Tech students present voted to endorse integration of qualified applicants, regardless of race. While it did galvanize support, make progress academically, and help draw national attention, it did not immediately lead to future integration of the Sugar Bowl or in the south largely due to state level politicians. After Van Leer passed, the Board of Regents, instituted a new policy of refusing to play against integrated teams in integrated stadiums for games that took place in the South, but this was largely symbolic and unenforced. Just four years later, Georgia accepted an invitation to the Orange Bowl to play against the University of Missouri, which had two black running backs.

In February of 1956 Governor Griffin with a loyal legislative session signed a bill approving the change of the Georgia Flag by adding a confederate flag on it. In July 1956, the Louisiana state legislature passed Act 579, known as the Athletic Events Bill, which prohibited interracial sports competitions. Governor Earl Long signed it on July 16. It said, in part:

All persons, firms and corporations are prohibited from sponsoring, arranging, participating in, or permitting on premises under their control any dancing, social functions, entertainments, athletic training, games, sports or contests and other such activities involving personal and social contacts, in which the participants or contestants are members of the white and negro races.

The Sugar Bowl would not host another Northern team for the next eight years. Eventually, a federal district court ruled Act 579 was unconstitutional. Five days after the 1964 Sugar Bowl, the United States Supreme Court agreed to let the lower court ruling stand. The lower court stated "Cities may as well face up to the facts of life: New Orleans, here and now, must adjust to the reality of having to operate desegregated public facilities. Time has run out. There is no defense left. There is no excuse left which a court, bound by respect for the Rule of Law, could now legitimize as a legal justification for a city's continued segregation of governmental facilities." The following year, Louisiana State University played in the 1965 Sugar Bowl against a Syracuse University team that featured two black players, Floyd Little and Jim Nance, both of whom would go on to play in the NFL.

In 1957, Georgia senator Leon Butts introduced a bill to ban all integrated athletic contests in the state, as well as other social functions such as dances and concerts. A violation of this act would be a misdemeanor crime, with a possible fine of up to 1,000 dollars or 60 days in jail. Governor Griffin supported the bill, but it received fierce opposition from sports writers and athletic clubs, who warned it would ruin Georgia athletics. The bill passed unanimously in the Georgia senate, but died in the house before it could be put to a vote, leading Butts to complain "I think it's a shame the major league ball clubs and the NAACP have gotten control of the Georgia House." A few months later, the Georgia Bulldogs played a scheduled football game against an integrated University of Michigan team, losing 26-0.

Georgia Tech guard Franklin Brooks was named the game's MVP. Bobby Grier's participation in the 1956 Sugar Bowl, as well as the support he received from various communities, is seen by some experts as a milestone in American race relations. Bobby Grier's is now known as a trailblazer who broke the color barrier.

Brooks went on to have a successful coaching career after a brief stint with the Washington Redskins. Brooks coached at the high school level before returning to Georgia Tech as an assistant coach under Pepper Rodgers. Excelling as an assistant coach, Brooks was poised to become Rogers' replacement but was untimely stricken with inoperable lung cancer.

Brooks was a non-smoker and non-drinker. According to doctor's reports, he developed cancer as a result of exposure to asbestos during a summer job as a teen. Despite his courageous fight over a two-year period, Brooks died in 1977. Among friends and family, Brooks' funeral procession included College and Pro Football greats such as Eddie Lee Ivery and Bill Curry.

Brooks' struggles with cancer contributed to reform and ultimately the elimination of unsafe asbestos production. Governments and businesses all around the world have urgently taken measures to eliminate structures containing asbestos over the last twenty-five years. Artist Julian Hoke Harris would later sculpt a portrait plaque to honor Van Leer's stance against Governor Griffin.

In 2019, Grier was elected as a member of the Sugar Bowl Hall of Fame. On Oct 1, 2022, Georgia Tech and University of Pittsburgh played again. During the game, the 1956 Sugar Bowl and Grier were honored. Grier was also enshrined in the Pittsburgh Hall of Fame live on ACC Network and ESPN. Actor Anthony Mackie, Grier's son Rob, granddaughter Camille and GT's grandson Blake Van Leer III were present on the field.

Later in 2022, Grier along with his son Rob were invited for a VIP tour of Georgia Tech, the College Football Hall of Fame, and the National Center for Civil and Human Rights. While at Georgia Tech, Grier met Georgia Tech's 1956 Quarterback Wade Mitchell for the first time since 1956. Georgia Tech's president Ángel Cabrera was there to welcome Grier. The Van Leer and Grier families remain close to this day.

A film about Bobby Grier and Blake R Van Leer is being produced by Bobby's son Rob and Blake's grandson. They want it to be a film about inspiring change makers and coming together.
