= Blake R. Van Leer =

American university president (1893–1956)

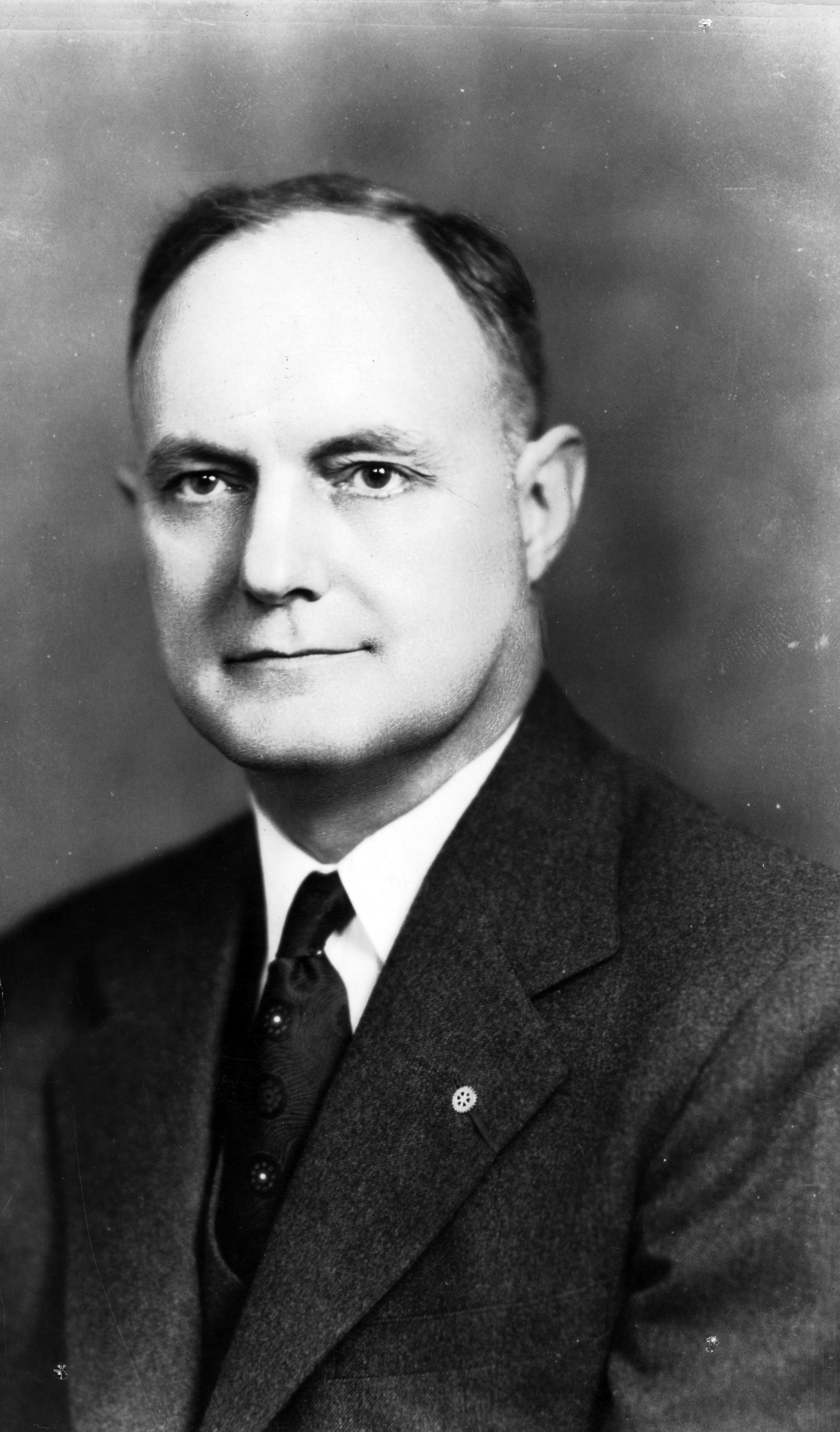
- Van Leer, c. 1937–1942

President of the Georgia Institute of Technology
- In office 1944–1956
- Preceded by: Marion L. Brittain
- Succeeded by: Edwin D. Harrison

Dean of Engineering University of Florida
- In office 1932–1937

Dean of Engineering North Carolina State University
- In office 1937–1941

Berkeley City Council
- In office 1924–1932

Personal details
- Born: August 16, 1893 Mangum, Oklahoma
- Died: January 23, 1956 (aged 62) Atlanta, Georgia
- Education: Purdue University; University of Caen Normandy; Ludwig-Maximilians-Universität München; University of California, Berkeley
- Occupation: University president

Military service
- Branch/service: United States Army
- Years of service: 1917–1953
- Rank: Colonel
- Unit: Corps of Engineers
- Battles/wars: World War I World War II
- Awards: Croix de Guerre

Blake Ragsdale Van Leer (16 August 1893 – 23 January 1956) was an American academic administrator, engineer, and U.S. Army officer who served as the fifth president of the Georgia Institute of Technology from 1944 until his death in 1956. Orphaned at a young age, Van Leer overcame early adversity to become a transformative leader in higher education. During his tenure at Georgia Tech, he played a crucial role in modernizing the institution, expanding its national reputation, and steering it through a period of significant social and academic change. Under his leadership, women were admitted to Georgia Tech for the first time, and foundational steps were taken toward racial integration.

== Early life and education ==
Van Leer was born in Mangum, Oklahoma to Maurice Langhorne Van Leer and Mary McKee Tarleton. After his father's death in 1897, he grew up in an all-girls Masonic orphanage in Fort Worth, Texas from the age of 4. At an early age he decided he wanted to be an engineer. He graduated with honors from Purdue University in 1915 with a degree in electrical engineering and later an M.S. in mechanical engineering while working at the University of California, Berkeley in 1920. Van Leer also studied at the University of Caen in France and the Ludwig-Maximilians-Universität München. He was awarded two doctorates, one from Washington & Jefferson College and the other from Purdue. In 1924, he married Ella Lillian Wall in Berkeley, California.

== Dean and officer ==
Van Leer was an U.S. Army officer and began his career as an engineer. During World War I, he led engineering teams who built bridges in front of the main infantry to cross rivers and fought in 5 different battles. On one occasion his unit held an island for two days against enemy forces and several members of his unit were killed in action. From 1932 to 1937, Van Leer was a dean at the University of Florida. During the Great Depression alongside educator and civil rights activist Mary McLeod Bethune, he lobbied for federal funding for Florida institutions. In 1937 he became the dean of the School of Engineering at North Carolina State University. During his tenure at both universities, numerous departments were established, and the first graduate engineering programs were created. While at NC State he advocated for women and encouraged many to pursue engineering degrees. The first 5 women would enroll in NC State's engineering programs and become the first to graduate in 1941. One of his students was Katharine Stinson, co-founder of Society of Women Engineers and the FAA's first female engineer. While here, he was also initiated as an honorary of the NCSU chapter of Theta Tau Professional Engineering Fraternity. Around 1940, with the permission of Dean Harrelson, Van Leer gave half his time to the North Carolina Office for Defense orders. He resigned his post as dean in 1942 to take military leave. During the war, he served as a U.S. Army officer (attaining the rank of colonel), after which he returned to lead the school. In 1945 Blake was appointed to the Board of the United States Naval Academy by President Harry S. Truman and helped expand its curriculum.

== Georgia Tech ==
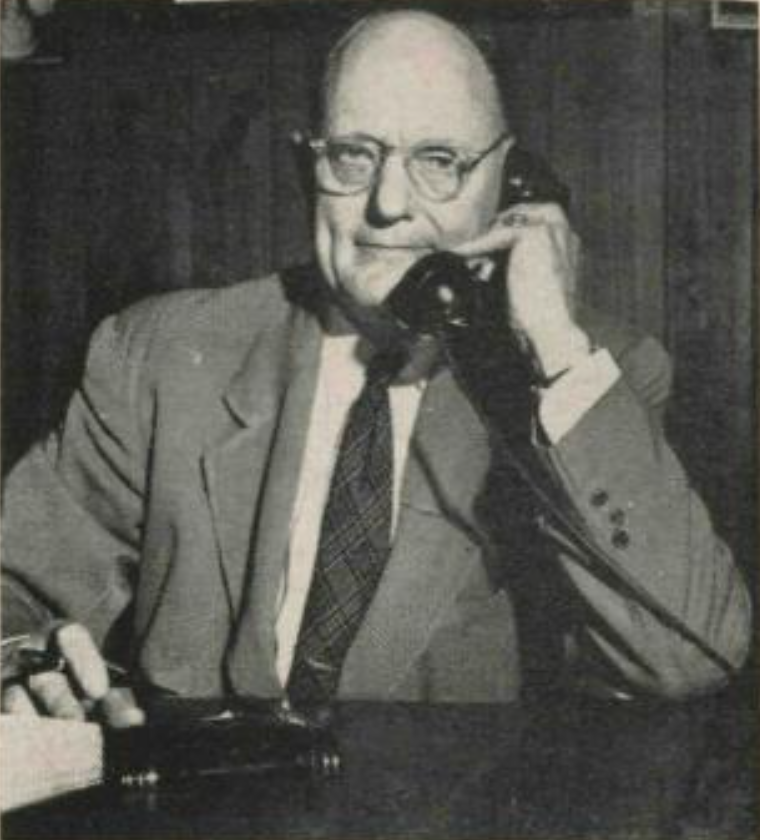
Van Leer, c. 1953

After World War II, Van Leer returned to become the president of Georgia Tech. During his tenure the school admitted women for the first time. He began allowing women to enroll in night school, and after a failed vote to allow women into Georgia Tech, he tried again and succeeded by split decision. Faculty member Robert B. Wallace was quoted "as saying Van Leer was a fighter who battled to the bitter end for what he believed," a trait he would show very clearly in late 1955. The first step towards integration was made during support for the 1956 Sugar Bowl game. During his time in office Georgia Tech also became the largest engineering school in the South and the third largest in the US and Canada. Van Leer also had a focus on making Atlanta the "MIT of the South." Throughout his career he lobbied major companies like Lockheed Corporation to expand to Atlanta. In 1946, Van Leer was appointed as a member to The United Nations Educational, Scientific and Cultural Organization who had a focus to work against racism through influential statements on race.

Van Leer might be best known for events centered around the 1956 Sugar Bowl. Known for giving frequent commencement speeches at the all-Black Morris Brown College, he stood up to Georgia governor Marvin Griffin's demand to bar Bobby Grier from participating in the 1956 Sugar Bowl game between Georgia Tech and Grier's University of Pittsburgh. Leading up to the game, Griffin sent numerous telegrams to Tech's Board of Regents and the press saying Georgia should not engage in racially integrated events which had Blacks either as participants or in the stands. The governor also called on the "Tech boys" to be punished. Coach Bobby Dodd and students left the whole affair up to Van Leer to battle Griffin and the Board of Regents. Van Leer was summoned by the Regents who commended Griffin for his stand on segregation.

Van Leer was publicly quoted:

Either we're going to the Sugar Bowl or you can find yourself another damn president of Georgia Tech.

Van Leer stuck to his statement, even receiving a standing ovation in the faculty senate, and the game went on as planned. Four years after his death in January 1956, an overwhelming majority of the 2,741 students present voted to endorse the integration of qualified applicants, regardless of race. Van Leer advocated women get into engineering later in his career as well. Today the building that houses Tech's school of Electrical and Computer Engineering bears his name.

Van Leer also founded Southern Polytechnic State University while president of Georgia Tech. The university merged into Kennesaw State University in 2015.

Van Leer died of a heart attack on January 24, 1956, at the Atlanta Veterans Hospital.

== Personal life ==
Van Leer was a descendant of the Van Leer Family. His direct ancestor Samuel Van Leer was an American Revolutionary War officer. Another ancestor is a Founding Father General Anthony Wayne who is the namesake for Bruce Wayne.

All of Van Leer's children would graduate as engineers. Van Leer's daughter Maryly V. Peck also became a college president and women's rights advocate after earning her master's degree and Doctorate in engineering. After earning a master's degree and multiple engineering degrees, his son Blake Wayne Van Leer also became a high-ranked military officer for the United States Navy. His youngest son Samuel Van Leer graduated from Georgia Tech with two engineering degrees, later a masters and led several private schools. Sam was quoted stating his dad "could imagine a Ramblin' Wreck from Georgia Tech being anyone, he did not concern himself with race or gender, he was always progressive."

== Legacy ==
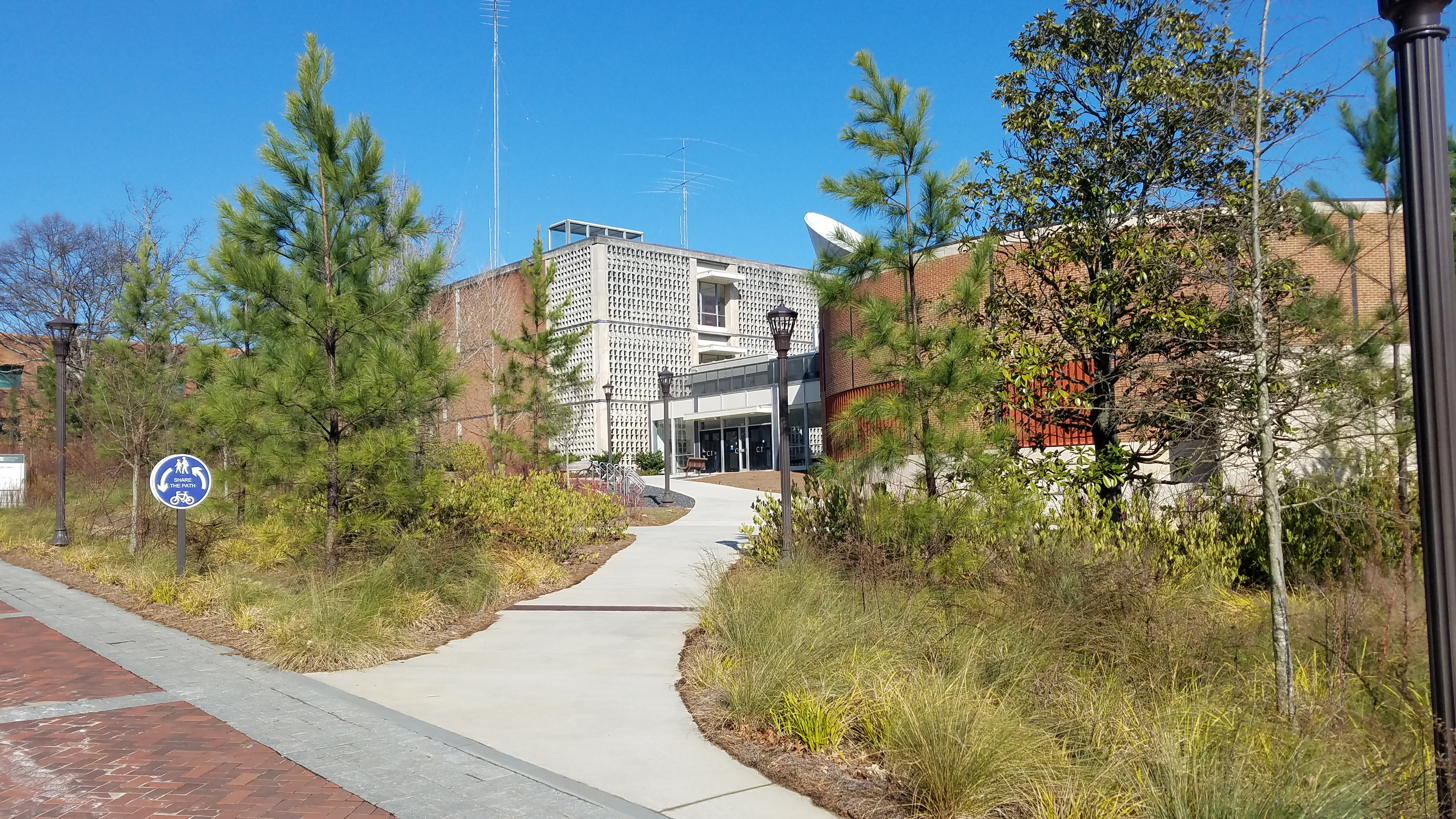
Main entrance to the Van Leer Building on the campus of the Georgia Institute of Technology

Van Leer is widely credited with laying the groundwork for Georgia Tech's evolution into a major research university and for championing policies of inclusion during a pivotal time in the American South. The building that houses Georgia Tech's school of Electrical and Computer Engineering bears his name. In 1964, the Blake R. Van Leer Scholarship was named after him, it's for out of state students attending Georgia Tech. The Van Leer society at NC State University is named after him. Artist Julian Hoke Harris sculpted a plaque to honor his stance against Governor Griffin. In 2022 a film was announced about the 1956 Sugar Bowl and it featuring him as a main character.

== See also ==
- History of the Georgia Institute of Technology
- List of members of the American Legion
- 1956 Sugar Bowl

== Works cited ==
- Robert C. McMath; Ronald H. Bayor; James E. Brittain; Lawrence Foster; August W. Giebelhaus; Germaine M. Reed (1985). Engineering the New South: Georgia Tech 1885–1985. Athens, GA: University of Georgia Press. ISBN 082030784X.
- United States. Congress. House. Committee on Armed Services (1947). Full Committee Hearings on Universal Military Training. U.S. Government Printing Office. p. 4333.
- Lewis Ferry Moody; Fifty Years' Progress in Hydraulics.
- Cooper, Paul; Samuel Martin, C.; O'Hern, Timothy J. (2016). "History of the Fluids Engineering Division". Journal of Fluids Engineering. 138 (10). doi:10.1115/1.4033976.
