= Richard Lui =

American television journalist

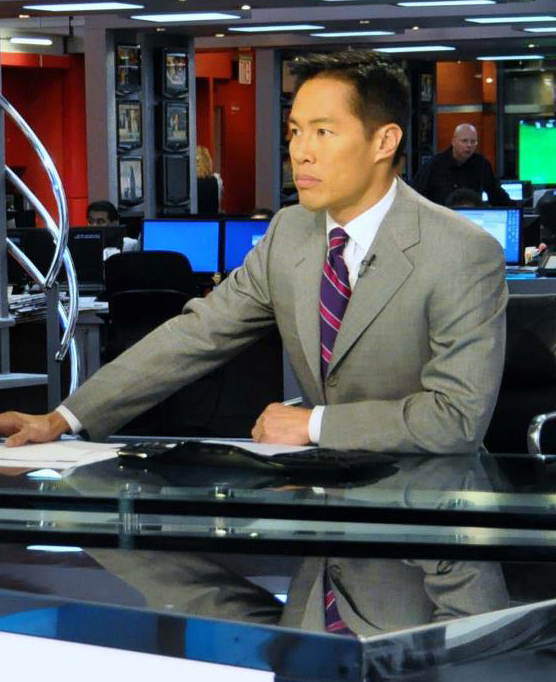
- Lui in 2012
- Born: California, U.S.
- Education: City College of San Francisco (AA) University of California, Berkeley (BA); University of Michigan (MBA)
- Occupation: News anchor
- Employer(s): MSNOW, Versant
- Notable credit(s): NBC News; CNN; Citigroup; Oliver Wyman
- Spouse: Ly Le (m. 2026)

Richard Lui (Chinese: 吕勇诗) is an American author, journalist, and filmmaker. He anchors for MSNOW and formerly MSNBC and NBC News. Lui is currently a breaking news anchor for MSNOW, broadcasting from Times Square in Manhattan, New York City. Prior to that role he was a co-host of NBC’s Early Today, and anchor of MSNBC daytime coverage. He was formerly at CNN Worldwide. At CNN Worldwide he became the first Asian American male to anchor a daily, national cable news show when he solo anchored the 10 a.m. hour on CNN Headline News (2007 to 2010). Mediaite ranked Lui among the top 100 in news buzz on its "Power Grid Influence Index of TV Anchors and Hosts" and one of "The 50 Sexiest in TV News".

Lui is also a columnist, contributing to publications including USA Today, Politico, The Seattle Times, Detroit Free Press, and San Francisco Chronicle. His public speaking spans six continents and some 200 events in the last several years. Twitter Counter places his following in the top 1%.

Lui's enterprise reporting has focused on humanitarian issues including gender equality, human trafficking, and affordable housing. His charity work in the same spaces has led him to work with Plan International USA as a global ambassador (alongside Freida Pinto and Marcia Cross) for its Because I am a Girl campaign. He also is ambassador for the Epilepsy Foundation and sits on the president's council for America's largest food source to the poor, Food Bank for New York City. Lui's work and reporting on humanitarian issues spans 30 years and six continents. He has received civil rights awards from organizations including AAJA, WWAAC, and OCA.

Before journalism, Lui spent 15 years in business with Fortune 500 and tech companies. He is patent holder and co-founder of the first bank-centric payment system, which was seed-funded and incubated by Citibank. Business Insider recognized Lui as one of 21 dynamic careers to watch alongside Warren Buffett and Mark Cuban.

Lui has directed two Academy Award qualified films, Sky Blossom in 2020, and Unconditional in 2023, which was screened at the White House by First Lady Jill Biden.

== Business career ==
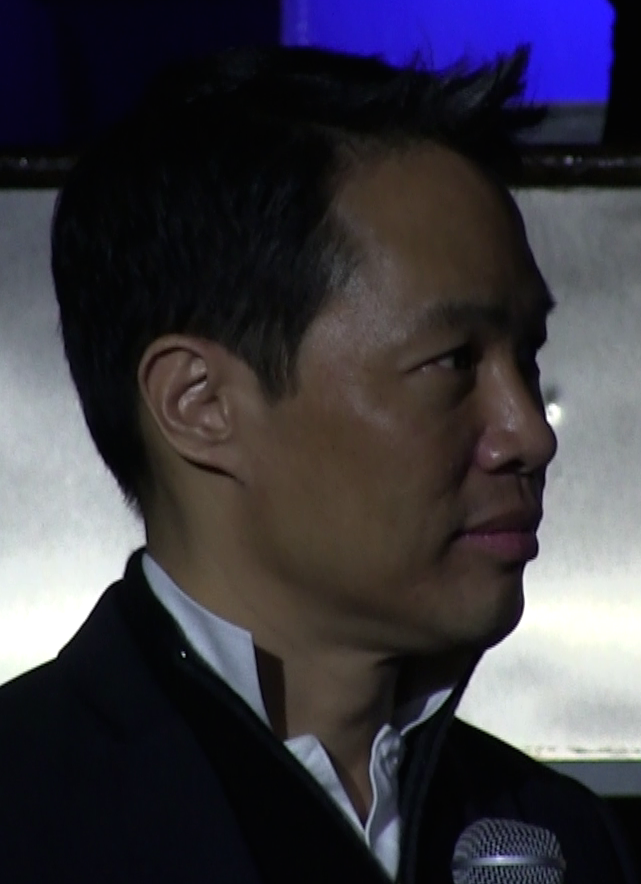
Richard Lui at a panel discussion for the show Fresh off the Boat

Lui started in business in 1985, working in manufacturing, strategy consulting, food and beverage, environmental, oil, and technology industries. He has held chief roles from operations to marketing. At the start of his career, Lui skipped college and spent four years at startup Mrs. Fields Cookies. At the age of 18, Lui became the youngest in the company's history to run a regional training center.

After Mrs. Fields, Lui entered college, followed by work at Clean Environment Equipment (QED), where he led its global advertising and public relations. According to the company's website, its oil recovery products are on almost every major refinery with an underground oil spill. Until 2008, Lui worked for Citibank as Director, COO, and CMO of a business unit focused on payments and commerce. His patented payment infrastructure bypassed MasterCard and Visa, enabling consumers to pay for goods and services by connecting directly to their bank. It included wireless access to checking, brokerage, and other funds. Before Citibank, Lui worked at Oliver Wyman New York. His business development work included moving online brokerage businesses to mobile platforms, and the globalization software market. Lui also helped launch a joint venture with IBM in the retail vertical.

== Charity and humanitarian work ==
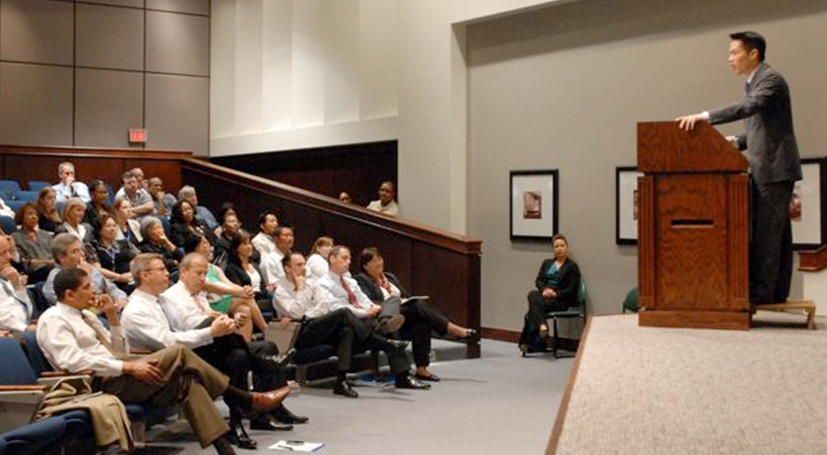
Richard Lui gives the keynote speech to Delta Air Lines executives on subject of the “universal worker” and globalization in May 2009.

Lui started community work in high school as a YMCA counselor in the 1980s. He taught addicted mothers computer skills at the American Indian Family Healing Center and served as campaign manager for a citywide position that managed City College of San Francisco.

As an ambassador for Plan International USA, Lui works to identify and advise on ways of talking about the role male adults and children have in gender inequality and female victim blaming, as well as help to generate organizational growth strategies. For Plan International USA, he has travelled to Central America, South America, Asia, and Oceania for research and to assess global trends.

Lui has collaborated with Polaris Project, a global anti-human trafficking organization. He has reported and consulted on human trafficking stories for a decade, and spoken on domestic and global trends at high schools, universities, and conferences globally. The U.S. Department of Justice asked Lui to present his work on trafficking at its annual gathering of attorneys and immigration officers in Atlanta in 2012.

Lui has worked with the Aspen Institute for several years, speaking at its annual, C-SPAN broadcast symposium on the "State of Race in America". He also led Aspen Institute conversations at the State Department on foreign affairs in U.S. journalism.

Lui is a member of the US State Department's Speakers Program—he has keynoted in Asia, Europe, and the Middle East. He is a UN Foundation Fellow and hosted programs alongside former Secretary of State Madeleine Albright and UN Secretary-General Ban Ki-moon for the United Nations Association of New York. He has given commencement speeches at UC Berkeley and City College of San Francisco, and spoken at events for Harvard University, Fuqua School of Business at Duke University, and Ross School of Business at the University of Michigan.

In the affordable and homeless housing space, Lui volunteered for Habitat for Humanity in Ghana, the Golan Heights, and Haiti with former President Jimmy Carter and former First Lady Rosalynn Carter. Lui served on the board of directors for Crossroads Homeless Services and PRI affordable housing development company.

== Civil rights ==
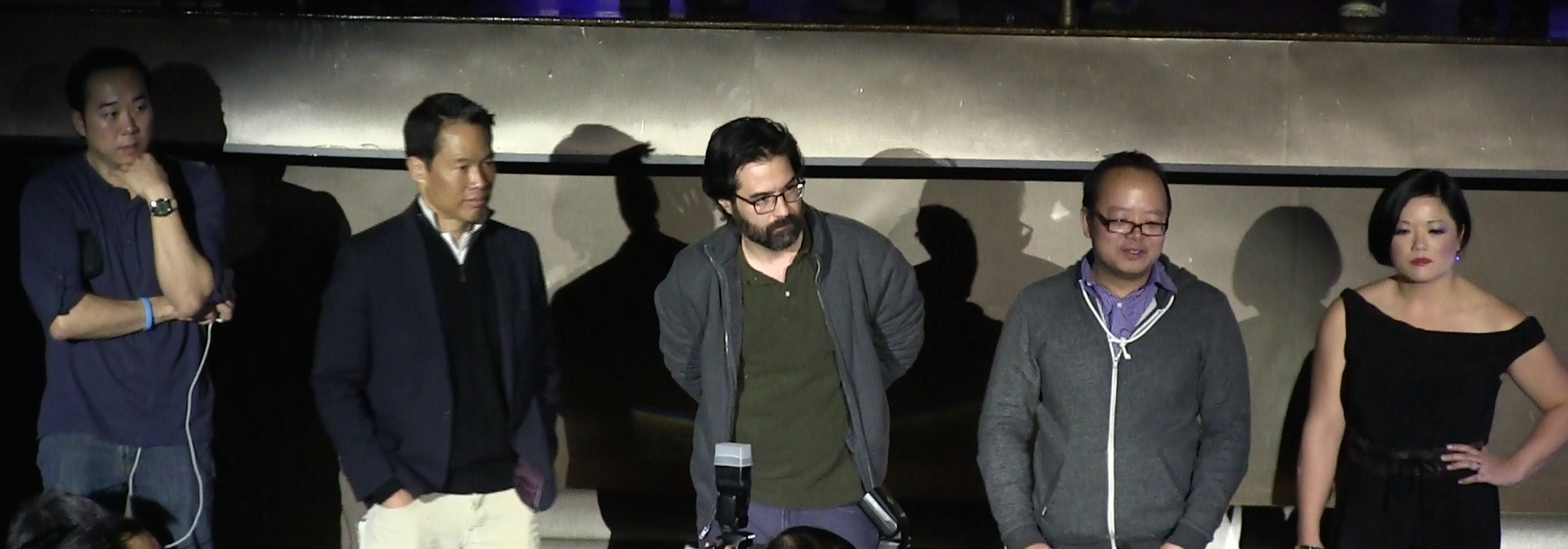
Richard Lui, Jeff Yang, Greg Pak, and Erin Quinn at a panel discussion for the show Fresh off the Boat

Asian Americans Advancing Justice awarded Lui an American Courage Award for Distinguished Service in 2014, the year after former Representative Barney Frank received it. The Asian American Journalists Association awarded Lui the Suzanne Ahn Civil Rights and Social Justice Award in 2013, an honor in memory of humanitarian Suzanne Ahn. Civil Rights organization OCA awarded Lui with its Community Service Award in 2012 and 2013.

== Politics ==
Lui's interest in politics started in the 1970s, when he debated California's controversial Proposition 13 during bus rides to school. That interest turned into a job at 19: campaign manager for San Francisco College Board incumbent Alan Wong. After the election, Lui returned to college and planned to write on policy and the affairs of state, subscribing to The Washington Post when it had to be mailed to the West Coast.

In the 2012 election cycle, Lui hosted APIAVote's Presidential Debate, APA Presidential Inaugural Ball, and APA Congressional Caucus' forum at the Capitol. He also conducted Asian Pacific American Institute on Congressional Studies (APAICS) training sessions for elected and appointed officials. Lui also contributes political opinion pieces to publications, including The Seattle Times, San Francisco Chronicle, Politico, and Huffington Post.

== Journalism career ==
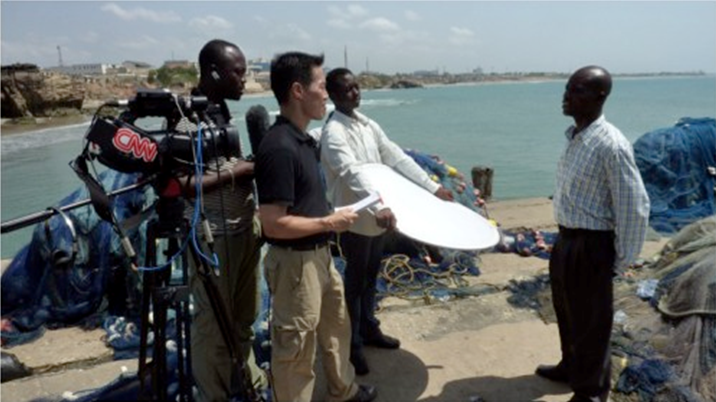
Richard Lui reporting for CNN on human trafficking in Ghana in March 2010.

In the 1990s, Lui was exposed to a pivotal time in California politics. As a reporter at KALX, he was assigned to Dianne Feinstein's first successful U.S. Senate campaign and the Rodney King verdict and riots.

Later, in the 2000s, Lui moved to Asia to capture a heated moment in regional politics. He was at Channel NewsAsia, an English language network reaching 24 territories. Two Muslim countries in Southeast Asia were undertaking key transformations. Indonesia’s Sukarno family was defeated after rule spanning over half a century. And Malaysia's prime minister, after almost a quarter of a century, handed over power. Lui also covered the South Asian tsunami, and the 2003 SARS and bird flu outbreaks.

During five years at CNN Worldwide, Lui anchored and reported on all CNN English-language networks, including CNN US, CNN International, and HLN. He anchored live breaking stories such as the 2009 Gaza-Israel War, Virginia Tech Massacre, 2006 Hezbollah-Israel War, Mumbai train terrorist bombings, and 2008 Mumbai attacks.

In 2006, Lui's undercover reporting exposed child sex slavery in Indonesia. Later, in a CNN Freedom Project report, he investigated seven-year-olds sold to Ghanaian fishermen as labor slaves. His field reporting explored political and civil rights controversies in the Asian-American community, including the 1882 Chinese Exclusion Act, which led to a system of illegal immigrants called paper sons. He reported on the racially motivated killing of Vincent Chin and its association with the Muslim-American community's post 9/11 challenges. In addition, he reported extensively from the Gulf on the BP oil spill. He received Peabody and Emmy awards for his team reporting at CNN during Hurricane Katrina and the Gulf Oil Spill.

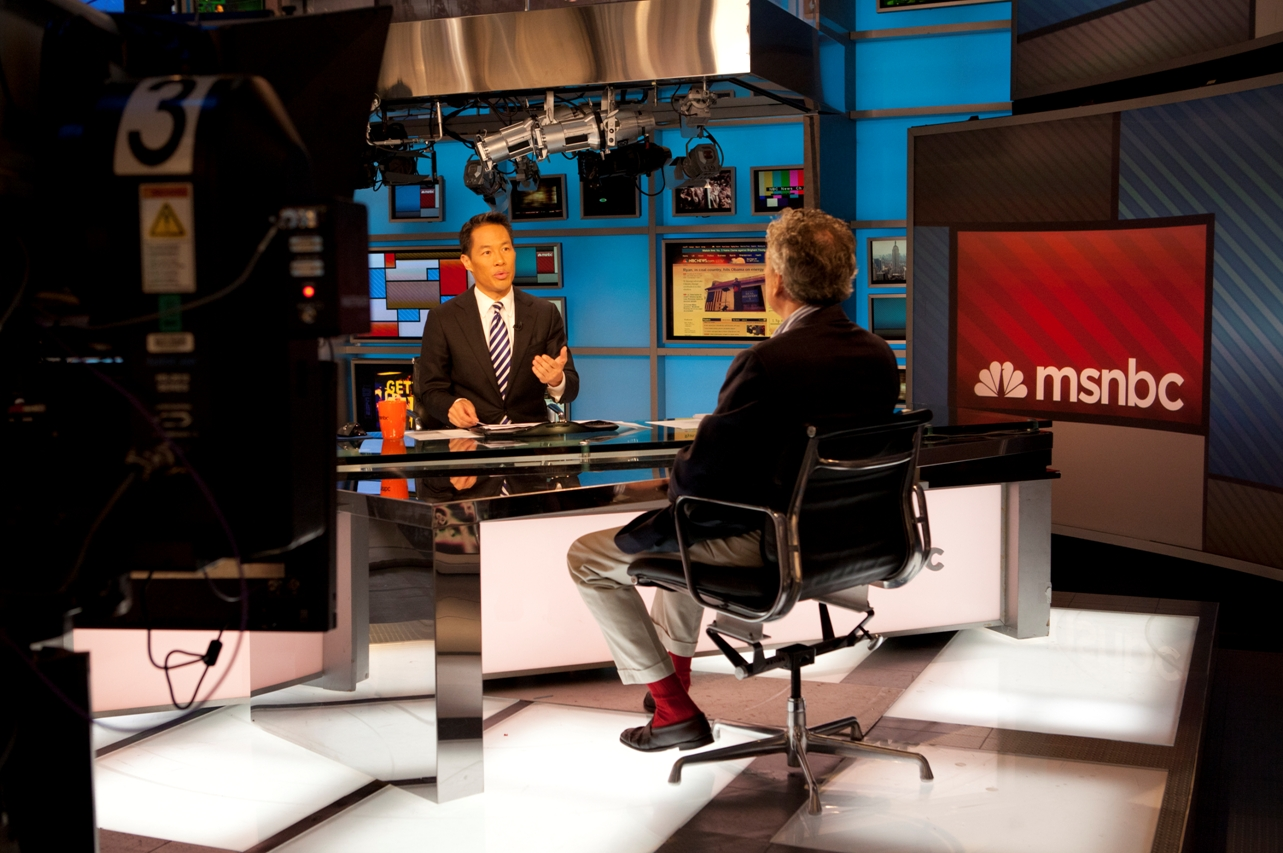
Richard Lui interviews a guest for MSNBC.

Lui joined MSNBC in 2010. Lui anchored Early Today for NBC News for several years. He is currently a breaking news anchor at MS NOW (formerly MSNBC). He is currently based at MS NOW's offices in Times Square. In the past, Lui covered sports for both NBC News and MSNBC morning shows. He also served as news anchor for The Weather Channel’s program with Al Roker, Wake Up With Al when NBC co-owned the weather-focused network.

Some of the events he's anchored breaking coverage of include the Scotland independence vote, 2013 government shutdown, Boston Marathon bombing, Japanese earthquake and tsunami, NATO's attack in Libya, and the Arab Spring and Egypt’s revolution. Lui's field reporting has included covering the Ferguson unrest, Hurricane Sandy, and the 2012 U.S. Presidential election. For the election, his reports ranged from the implications of the Tea Party movement to presidential election night exit poll data. In an NBC News investigation, Lui reported on a phenomenon involving high-volume brothels in the U.S. where women are forced to have sex up to a hundred times a day.

Lui is a member of the Asian American Journalists Association and was elected 2013 Member of the Year.

== Personal life ==
Because his grandfather, an undocumented immigrant, filed false paper son documents, Lui's real last name is Wong. Lui is the son of a Presbyterian minister. He said in an op-ed he grew up on welfare and almost flunked out of high school. He is an automobile enthusiast, and is an aerodynamics and airplane industry hobbyist. In his speeches, he has said he started "wrenching" when he was 10. He studied in Spain and speaks Spanish conversationally.

== Books ==
- Lui, Richard; French, Nancy (2021). Enough About Me : The Unexpected Power of Selflessness. Grand Rapids, Michigan: Harper Collins. ISBN 978-0-310-36239-5. OCLC 1225977675.

== Films ==
- Sky Blossom: Diaries of the Next Greatest Generation (2020)

== See also ==
- Notable University of Michigan Alumni
- Chinese Americans in New York City
- New Yorkers in journalism
