= Sky Blossom =

- Theatrical release poster
- Directed by: Richard Lui
- Produced by: Hailey Lee; Alex Lo; Richard Lui; Donald Young
- Cinematography: Eliana Alvarez Martinez
- Edited by: Bret Sigler; Zara Serabian Arthur
- Music by: Maria Lineva
- Production company: Sky Blossom Films
- Distributed by: Universal Pictures Home Entertainment (DVD & Digital)
- Release dates: October 29, 2020 (LA Asian Pacific Film Fest); November 11, 2020
- Running time: 79 minutes
- Country: United States
- Language: English
- Budget: $3.1 million (USD)

Sky Blossom: Diaries of the Next Greatest Generation is a 2020 American documentary film directed by Richard Lui which profiles five students across the United States who are caregivers for their disabled military veteran parents or grandparents. Variety magazine named the film as a shortlist contender for the 2021 Oscars, and also qualified for that year's awards. The film was the most widely distributed documentary of 2021. It won the "Feature Film" category of the 72nd Christopher Awards.

The documentary was released in theaters nationwide for one night only through a community partnership of AMC Theatres and Universal Pictures. The film premiered at the John F. Kennedy Center for the Performing Arts with a drive-in theater event on Veterans Day 2020. The film was later broadcast on MSNBC in May 2021.

== Synopsis ==
Five families are profiled in the film, each with a student providing care for a veteran parent or grandparent with disabilities. The film refers to these students as the "Next Greatest Generation."

- Allen Family (McMinnville, Tennessee): High school cheerleader Deryn Allen has been helping her father, Chaz, an Army veteran who lost his legs after stepping on a bomb, put on his prosthetics since she was eight years old.
- Alvarado Family (Long Beach, California): 12-year-old Rhianna Alvarado defends her dad from bullies, who give him "ugly stares" due to his appearance, the result of exposure to burn pits.
- Grier Family (Wexford, Pennsylvania): Air Force veteran Bobby Grier, an aging civil rights icon, is cared for by his granddaughter, Camille, and his son, Rob Jr. Rob opens up about the strain caring for his parents put on his marriage and on his role as a father.
- Kapanui Family (Waimea, Hawaii): Brother and sister Kaleo and Kamaile have put their college studies on hold to look after their grandfather, Bobby, a veteran with dementia. Their grandfather is the only family they have left.
- Ploof Family (Howell, Michigan): 22-year-old Jenna Ploof is the primary breadwinner for her family, balancing her college studies and job with caring for her younger sister and father, Bill, an amputee who has suffered several strokes. While she was in high school, Jenna and her family briefly experienced homelessness when Bill's amputation prevented him from continuing to work as a truck driver.

The film's title is inspired by a World War II era term for paratroopers coming to aid of the wounded on the ground.

== Production ==
The film was shot over four years. The film is inspired by Director Richard Lui's personal experience as a caregiver for his father with Alzheimer's. Lui, an MSNBC news anchor, flew between his work in New York City and his father's home in San Francisco several times a month to help care for his father.

The film is executive produced by television personality Montel Williams, actor David Hyde Pierce, Medal of Honor recipient Colonel Jack Jacobs, Bob & Dolores Hope Foundation CEO Linda Hope, and documentarian Jean Tsien.

=== Style ===
The film blends fly-on-the-wall cinema verité with animation, archival video, and interviews conducted by the producers with each of the five families. The animated scenes, drawn by former Disney animator Davy Liu, show scenes of the children's heroism in caring for family members. Composer Maria Lineva wrote original leitmotifs for each of the five families to provide a unique musical sound for each family. The score was performed by a 48-person orchestra made up of students from the Berklee College of Music.

== Response ==
The film is supported by a bipartisan group of Members of the United States Congress, led by Speaker of the House Nancy Pelosi and Senate Majority Leader Mitch McConnell. Other lawmakers supporting the film include Senate Minority Leader Chuck Schumer, Senator Susan Collins, and Senator Tammy Duckworth.

The film was nominated for "Best Documentary" at the AARP The Magazine 2021 Movies for Grownups Awards. The film also won the Founders Choice Award at the GI Film Festival.

== Release ==
The film was released on DVD and Digital by Universal Pictures Home Entertainment on May 25, 2021. Later that week, the film was broadcast on MSNBC, with 374,000 viewers watching the 9pm broadcast. Sky Blossom began streaming on Peacock in July 2021.

The film's original soundtrack, composed by Maria Lineva and performed by the Berklee College of Music Contemporary Symphony Orchestra, was released by NBCUniversal's Back Lot Music, and was qualified for the 64th Annual Grammy Awards.
